= 2019 Andhra Pradesh Legislative Assembly election =

- 11 April 2019

All 175 seats in the Andhra Pradesh Legislative Assembly 88 seats needed for a majority
- Registered: 39,405,937
- Turnout: 31,680,063 (80.39%)
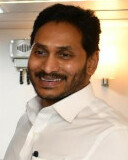

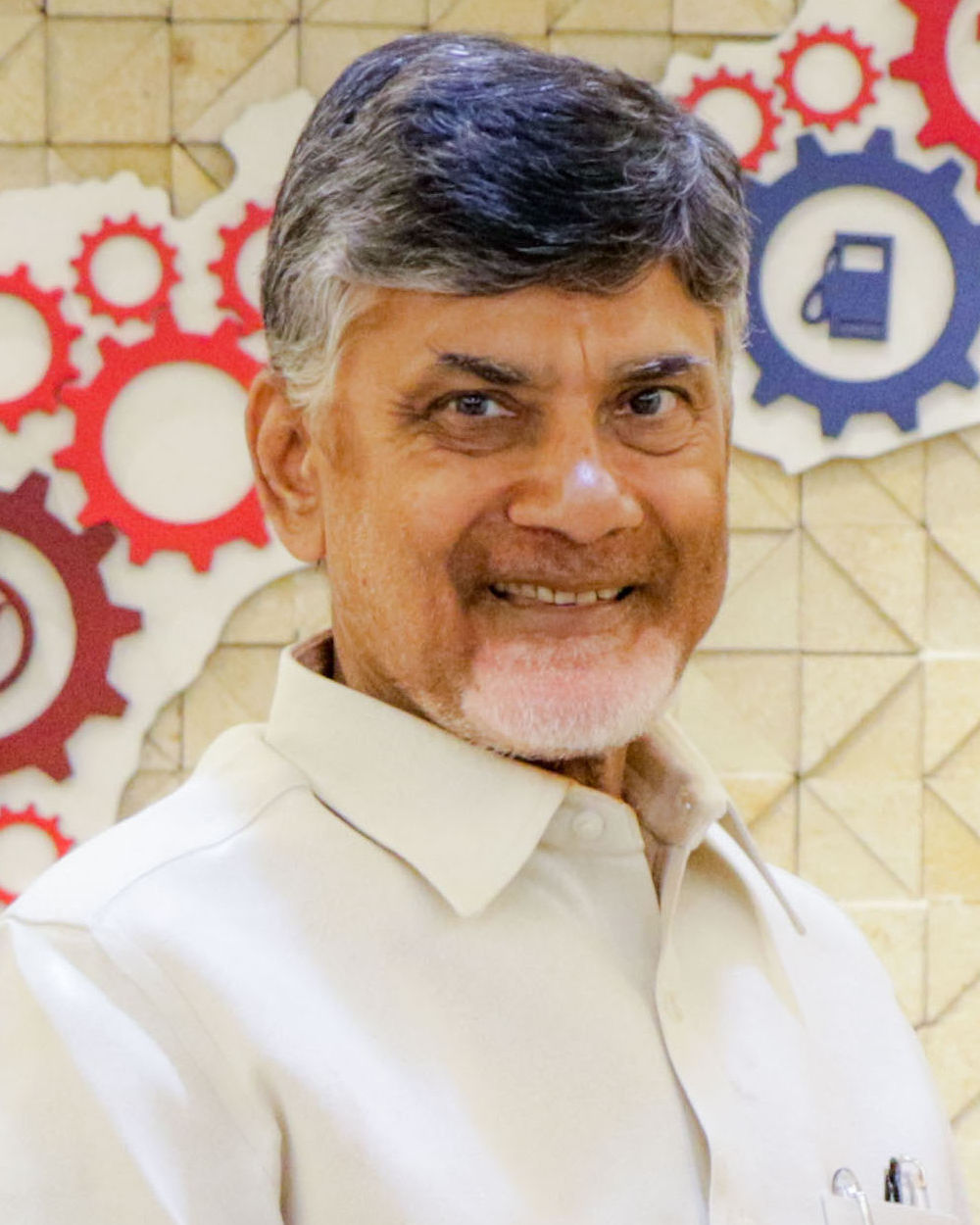

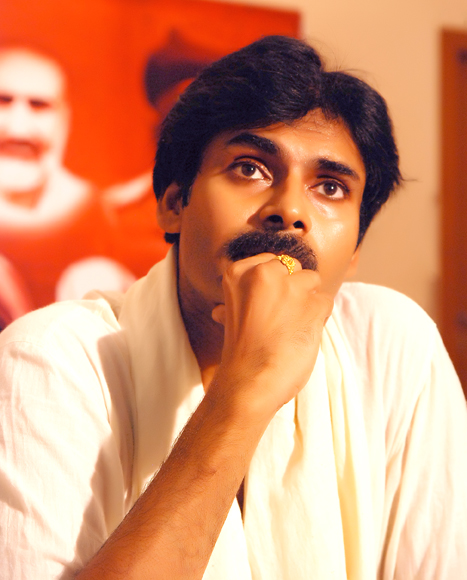
	Majority party	Minority party	Third party
Leader	Y. S. Jagan Mohan Reddy	N. Chandrababu Naidu	Pawan Kalyan
Party	YSRCP	TDP	JSP
Alliance	–	–	JSP+
Leader since	2011	1995	2014
Leader's seat	Pulivendla (won)	Kuppam (won)	Bhimavaram (lost), Gajuwaka (lost)
Last election	67 seats, 44.60%	102 seats, 44.90%	Party did not contest
Seats won	151	23	1
Seat change	▲84	▼79	New party
Popular vote	15,688,569	12,304,668	1,736,811
Percentage	49.95%	39.17%	5.53%
Swing	▲5.35%	▼5.73%	New party
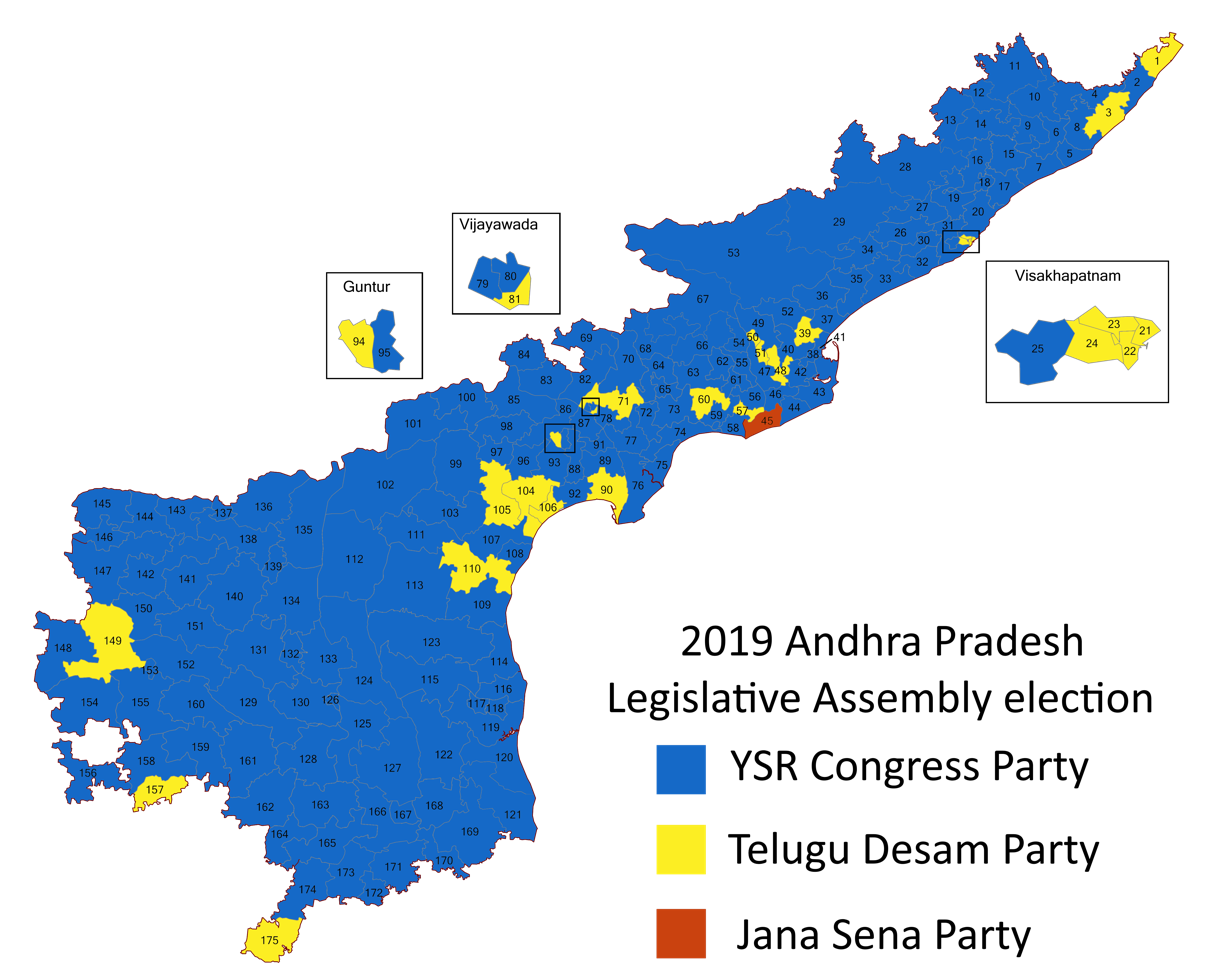

- Party-wise structure
Chief Minister before election
N. Chandrababu Naidu
TDP
Chief Minister after election
Y. S. Jagan Mohan Reddy
YSRCP

The 2019 Andhra Pradesh Legislative Assembly election were held in the Indian state of Andhra Pradesh on 11 April 2019 for constituting the fifteenth legislative assembly in the state. They were held alongside the 2019 Indian general election.

The YSR Congress Party (YSRCP) won the election in a landslide, winning 151 of the 175 seats, with the incumbent Telugu Desam Party (TDP) winning 23. The Janasena Party (JSP) entered the legislature with one seat, while the Indian National Congress (INC), Bharatiya Janata Party (BJP), Communist Party of India (CPI) and Communist Party of India (Marxist) (CPI(M)) failed to win any seats.

Y. S. Jagan Mohan Reddy was unanimously voted as legislature leader of the YSRCP, and was invited to form the government by the Governor of Andhra Pradesh, E. S. L. Narasimhan. This was the second assembly in Andhra Pradesh after the bifurcation of the state into Andhra Pradesh and Telangana.

== Previous assembly ==
In the 2014 Andhra Pradesh Assembly election, the TDP, led by chief N. Chandrababu Naidu, in alliance with the JSP, led by chief Pawan Kalyan, and the BJP, emerged as the single largest party. With 88 seats required to win a majority, the alliance won 103 seats of the 175 seats. Naidu was invited to form the government to constitute the fourteenth legislative assembly by the Governor of Andhra Pradesh, E. S. L. Narasimhan. It was the first Assembly in Andhra Pradesh after the bifurcation of the state into Andhra Pradesh and Telangana.

== Background ==
Y. S. Jagan Mohan Reddy the leader of the main opposition in the Andhra Pradesh assembly, started his 3,648-km-long Praja Sankalpa Yatra on 6 November 2017. In this padayatra, Reddy launched an attack on the incumbent TDP government. He covered more than 130 out of the 175 assembly constituencies in the state, from the YSR Ghat in Idupulapaya at Kadapa to Ichchapuram in Srikakulam district. During this padayatra, he addressed 124 public meetings. Whereas the leader of JSP, Pawan Kalyan hurled allegations of corruption against the ruling TDP government and accused the BJP of inflicting injustice on Andhra Pradesh over the promised Special Category Status. JSP subsequently broke the alliance with TDP. The TDP also withdrew from the National Democratic Alliance (NDA) in March 2018 over Special Category Status issue. The ruling alliance members TDP, JSP and BJP who subsequently broke away from each other contested independently in the 2019 assembly elections. In the four-cornered contest, the YSRCP led by Y. S. Jagan Mohan Reddy swept the polls.

== Schedule ==
Poll event	Date
Notification date	18 March 2019
Last date for filing nomination	25 March 2019
Scrutiny of nomination	26 March 2019
Last date for withdrawal of nomination	28 March 2019
Date of poll	11 April 2019
Date of counting of votes	23 May 2019

== Election day ==
The election was held in a single phase on 11 April for 175 assembly and 25 parliamentary constituencies. A 79.88% voter turnout was recorded by the end of the election day, which was 1.92% higher than the 2014 Andhra Pradesh Legislative Assembly election. 15,545,211 Male and 15,787,759 Female voters cast their votes in the election. Overall 31,333,631 of a possible 39,345,717 voters participated in the election.

The highest turnout of 85.93% was recorded in Prakasam district followed by Guntur district with 82.37%, while Visakhapatnam district recorded the lowest turnout of 73.67%. Addanki constituency recorded the highest voter turnout of 89.82% voting and Visakhapatnam West constituency registered the lowest turnout of 58.19%.

Reports and complaints of glitches and malfunctioning of the EVM were reported in nearly 50 places which resulted in voters queuing up in the lines for long hours and subsequently resulting in violence among the supporters of the political parties. The incumbent Chief Minister N. Chandrababu Naidu complained to the Election Commission of India (ECI) in New Delhi requesting to revert the electoral process to the ballot papers and subsequently requested the ECI to count and verify the Voter Verified Paper Audit Trail (VVPAT) to ensure transparency, authenticity and proper declaration of the results. An incident of mismatch with one EVM-VVPAT took place in one of the constituency citing human error and another incident reported the casting of vote to one party on EVM resulted in the favor of the other in the VVPAT slip. The random checking of the VVPAT was only increased to a number of 5 EVM's.

== Parties and alliances ==
Seat distribution of JSP+

Alliance/Party		Flag	Symbol	Leader	Seats contested	
Telugu Desam Party				N. Chandrababu Naidu	175	
YSR Congress Party				Y. S. Jagan Mohan Reddy	175	
Indian National Congress				Raghu Veera Reddy	174	
Bharatiya Janata Party				Kanna Lakshminarayana	173	
JSP+	Janasena Party			Pawan Kalyan	137	172
JSP+	Bahujan Samaj Party			Mayawati	21	172
JSP+	Communist Party of India (Marxist)			B. V. Raghavulu	7	172
JSP+	Communist Party of India			K. Ramakrishna	7	172

== Candidates ==
District	Constituency		TDP		YSRCP		JSP+	
District	No.	Name	Party	Candidate	Party	Candidate	Party	Candidate
Srikakulam	1	Ichchapuram	TDP	Ashok Bendalam	YSRCP	Piriya Sairaj	JSP	Dasari Raju
Srikakulam	2	Palasa	TDP	Gouthu Sireesha	YSRCP	Seediri Appalaraju	JSP	Kotha Purnachandra Rao
Srikakulam	3	Tekkali	TDP	Kinjarapu Atchannaidu	YSRCP	Perada Tilak	JSP	Kanithi Kiran Kumar
Srikakulam	4	Pathapatnam	TDP	Kalamata Venkataramana	YSRCP	Reddy Shanthi	JSP	Gedela Chaitanya
Srikakulam	5	Srikakulam	TDP	Gunda Lakshmi Devi	YSRCP	Dharmana Prasada Rao	JSP	Korada Sarveswara Rao
Srikakulam	6	Amadalavalasa	TDP	Koona Ravi Kumar	YSRCP	Thammineni Seetharam	JSP	Pedada Ramamohana Rao
Srikakulam	7	Etcherla	TDP	Kimidi Kalavenkata Rao	YSRCP	Gorle Kiran Kumar	JSP	Badana Venkata Janardhan
Srikakulam	8	Narasannapeta	TDP	Baggu Ramanamurthy	YSRCP	Dharmana Krishna Das	JSP	Metta Vaikunta Rao
Srikakulam	9	Rajam (SC)	TDP	Kondru Murali Mohan	YSRCP	Kambala Jogulu	JSP	Mucha Srinivasa Rao
Srikakulam	10	Palakonda (ST)	TDP	Nimmaka Jaya Krishna	YSRCP	Viswasarayi Kalavathi	CPI	D. V. G. Sankar Rao
Vizianagaram	11	Kurupam (ST)	TDP	Narasimha Priya Datraj	YSRCP	Pamula Pushpa Sreevani	CPI(M)	K. Avinash
Vizianagaram	12	Parvathipuram (SC)	TDP	Bobbili Chiranjeevulu	YSRCP	Alajangi Jogarao	JSP	Gongada Gowri Shankar Rao
Vizianagaram	13	Salur (ST)	TDP	R. P. Banjdev	YSRCP	Peedika Rajanna Dora	JSP	Bonela Govindamma
Vizianagaram	14	Bobbili	TDP	R. V. Sujay Krishna Ranga Rao	YSRCP	S. V. China Appala Naidu	JSP	Girada Appalaswami
Vizianagaram	15	Cheepurupalli	TDP	Kimidi Nagarjuna	YSRCP	Botsa Satyanarayana	JSP	Mailapalli Srinivasarao
Vizianagaram	16	Gajapathinagaram	TDP	Kondapalli Appala Naidu	YSRCP	Botcha Appalanarasayya	JSP	T. Rajiv Kumar
Vizianagaram	17	Nellimarla	TDP	Pathivada Narayanaswamy Naidu	YSRCP	Baddukonda Appala Naidu	JSP	Lokam Naga Madhavi
Vizianagaram	18	Vizianagaram	TDP	Pusapati Aditi Vijayalakshmi	YSRCP	Kolagatla Veerbhadra Swamy	JSP	P. Yeshasvi
Vizianagaram	19	Srungavarapukota	TDP	Kolla Lalitha Kumari	YSRCP	K. Sreenivas	CPI	P. Kameswarao
Visakhapatnam	20	Bhimili	TDP	Sabbam Hari	YSRCP	Avanthi Srinivas	JSP	Panchakarla Sandeep
Visakhapatnam	21	Visakhapatnam East	TDP	Velagapudi Ramakrishna Babu	YSRCP	Akaramani Vijaya Nirmala	JSP	Kona Tatarao
Visakhapatnam	22	Visakhapatnam South	TDP	Vasupalli Ganesh Kumar	YSRCP	Dronamraju Srinivas	JSP	Gampala Giridhar
Visakhapatnam	23	Visakhapatnam North	TDP	Ganta Srinivasa Rao	YSRCP	K. K Raju	JSP	Pasupuleti Usha Kiran
Visakhapatnam	24	Visakhapatnam West	TDP	P. G. V. R. Naidu	YSRCP	Malla Vijaya Prasad	CPI	J. V. Satyanarayana Murthy
Visakhapatnam	25	Gajuwaka	TDP	Palla Srinivasa Rao	YSRCP	Tippala Nagireddy	JSP	Pawan Kalyan
Visakhapatnam	26	Chodavaram	TDP	Kalidindi Suryana Naga Sanyasi Raju	YSRCP	Karanam Dharmasri	JSP	P. V. S. N. Raju
Visakhapatnam	27	Madugula	TDP	Gavireddy Ramanaidu	YSRCP	Budi Mutyala Naidu	JSP	G. Sanyasi Naidu
Visakhapatnam	28	Araku Valley (ST)	TDP	Kidari Sravan Kumar	YSRCP	Chetti Palguna	CPI(M)	K. Surendra
Visakhapatnam	29	Paderu (ST)	TDP	Giddi Eswari	YSRCP	Kottagulli Bhagya Lakshmi	JSP	Pasupuleti Balaraju
Visakhapatnam	30	Anakapalle	TDP	Peela Govinda Satyanarayana	YSRCP	Gudivada Amarnath	JSP	Paruchuri Bhaskar Rao
Visakhapatnam	31	Pendurthi	TDP	Bandaru Satyanarayana Murthy	YSRCP	Adeep Raj	JSP	Chintalapudi Venkataramaiah
Visakhapatnam	32	Elamanchili	TDP	Panchakarla Ramesh Babu	YSRCP	Uppalapati Kannababu Raju	JSP	Sundarapu Vijaya Kumar
Visakhapatnam	33	Payakaraopet (SC)	TDP	B. Bangarayya	YSRCP	Golla Babu Rao	JSP	Nakka Raja Babu
Visakhapatnam	34	Narsipatnam	TDP	Ayyanna Patrudu Chintakayala	YSRCP	Petla Uma Sankara Ganesh	Did not contest	
East Godavari	35	Tuni	TDP	Yanamala Rama Krishnudu	YSRCP	Dadisetti Ramalingeswara Rao	JSP	Raja Ashok Babu
East Godavari	36	Prathipadu (East Godavari)	TDP	Varupula Raja	YSRCP	Parvatha Purnachandra Prasad	JSP	Varupula Thammaiah Babu
East Godavari	37	Pithapuram	TDP	S. V. S. N. Varma	YSRCP	Pendem Dorababu	JSP	Makineedi Seshu Kumari
East Godavari	38	Kakinada Rural	TDP	Pilli Ananta Lakshmi	YSRCP	Kurasala Kannababu	JSP	Pantam Nanaji
East Godavari	39	Peddapuram	TDP	Nimmakayala Chinarajappa	YSRCP	Thota Saraswathi Ane Vani	JSP	Tummala Ramaswamy (Babu)
East Godavari	40	Anaparthy	TDP	Ramakrishna Reddy	YSRCP	Sathi Suryanarayana Reddy	JSP	Relangi Nageswara Rao
East Godavari	41	Kakinada City	TDP	Vanamadi Kondababu	YSRCP	Dwarampudi Chandrasekhar Reddy	JSP	Mutha Sasidhar
East Godavari	42	Ramachandrapuram	TDP	Thota Trimurthulu	YSRCP	Chelluboyina Venugopala Krishna	JSP	Polisetty Chandrasekhar
East Godavari	43	Mummidivaram	TDP	Datla Subbaraju	YSRCP	Ponnada Venkata Satish Kumar	JSP	Pithani Balakrishna
East Godavari	44	Amalapuram (SC)	TDP	Aithabathula Ananda Rao	YSRCP	Pinipe Viswarup	JSP	Shetty Battula Rajababu
East Godavari	45	Razole (SC)	TDP	Gollapalli Surya Rao	YSRCP	Bonthu Rajeswara Rao	JSP	Rapaka Vara Prasada Rao
East Godavari	46	Gannavaram (East Godavari) (SC)	TDP	Nelapudi Stalin Babu	YSRCP	Kondeti Chittibabu	JSP	Pamula Rajeswari
East Godavari	47	Kothapeta	TDP	Bandaru Satyananda Rao	YSRCP	Chirla Jaggi Reddy	JSP	Bandaru Srinivasa Rao
East Godavari	48	Mandapeta	TDP	V. Jogeswara Rao	YSRCP	Pilli Subhash Chandra Bose	JSP	Vegulla Leela Krishna
East Godavari	49	Rajanagaram	TDP	Pendurthi Venkatesh	YSRCP	Jakkampudi Raja	JSP	Rayapu Reddy Prasad
East Godavari	50	Rajahmundry City	TDP	Adireddy Bhavani	YSRCP	Routhu Suryaprakash Rao	JSP	Atthi Satyanarayana
East Godavari	51	Rajahmundry Rural	TDP	Gorantla Butchaiah Chowdary	YSRCP	Akula Veerraju	JSP	Kandula Durgesh
East Godavari	52	Jaggampeta	TDP	Jyothula Nehru	YSRCP	Jyothula Chantibabu	JSP	Patamsetti Suryachandra
East Godavari	53	Rampachodavaram (ST)	TDP	Vanthala Rajeswari	YSRCP	Nagulapalli Dhanalakshmi	CPI(M)	S. Rajaiah
West Godavari	54	Kovvur (SC)	TDP	Vangalapudi Anitha	YSRCP	Taneti Vanitha	BSP	Tamballapalli Ravi Kumar Murthy
West Godavari	55	Nidadavole	TDP	Burugupalli Sesha Rao	YSRCP	Geddam Srinivas Naidu	JSP	Atikela Ramyasri
West Godavari	56	Achanta	TDP	Pithani Satyanarayana	YSRCP	Cherukuvada Sri Ranganadha Raju	JSP	Javvadhi Venkata Vijayaram
West Godavari	57	Palakollu	TDP	Nimmala Rama Naidu	YSRCP	Chavataplli Satyanarayana Murthy (Babji)	JSP	Gunnam Nagababu
West Godavari	58	Narasapuram	TDP	Bandaru Madhava Naidu	YSRCP	Mudunuri Prasada Raju	JSP	Bommidi Narayana Nayakar
West Godavari	59	Bhimavaram	TDP	Pulaparthi Ramanjaneyulu	YSRCP	Grandhi Srinivas	JSP	Pawan Kalyan
West Godavari	60	Undi	TDP	Mantena Rama Raju	YSRCP	P. V. L. Narasimha Raju	CPI(M)	B. Balaram
West Godavari	61	Tanuku	TDP	Arimilli Radhakrishna	YSRCP	Karumuri Venkata Nageswara Rao	JSP	Pasupuleti Rama Rao
West Godavari	62	Tadepalligudem	TDP	Eli Venkata Madhusudhana Rao (Nani)	YSRCP	Kottu Satyanarayana	JSP	Bolisetti Srinivas
West Godavari	63	Unguturu	TDP	Ganni Veeranjaneyulu	YSRCP	Puppala Srinivasa Rao	JSP	Navudu Venkata Ramana
West Godavari	64	Denduluru	TDP	Chintamaneni Prabhakar	YSRCP	Kotaru Abbaya Chowdary	JSP	Gantasala Venkatalakshmi
West Godavari	65	Eluru	TDP	Badeti Bujji	YSRCP	Alla Nani	JSP	Reddy Appala Naidu
West Godavari	66	Gopalapuram (SC)	TDP	Muppidi Venkateswara Rao	YSRCP	Talari Venkat Rao	BSP	Sirra Bharatha Rao
West Godavari	67	Polavaram (ST)	TDP	Boragam Srinivasa Rao	YSRCP	Tellam Balaraju	JSP	Chirri Balaraju
West Godavari	68	Chintalapudi (SC)	TDP	Karra Raja Rao	YSRCP	Vunnamatla Rakada Eliza	JSP	Mekala Eswarayya
Krishna	69	Tiruvuru (SC)	TDP	Kothapalli Samuel Jawahar	YSRCP	Kokkiligadda Rakshana Nidhi	BSP	Namburi Srinivas
Krishna	70	Nuzvid	TDP	Muddaraboyina Venkateswara Rao	YSRCP	Meka Venkata Pratap Apparao	JSP	Basava Vykunta Venkata Bhaskar rao
Krishna	71	Gannavaram (Krishna)	TDP	Vallabhaneni Vamsi Mohan	YSRCP	Yarlagadda Venkata Rao	CPI	Syed Afsar
Krishna	72	Gudivada	TDP	Devineni Avinash	YSRCP	Kodali Nani	Did not contest	
Krishna	73	Kaikalur	TDP	Jayamangala Venkata Ramana	YSRCP	Dulam Nageswara Rao	JSP	B. V. Rao
Krishna	74	Pedana	TDP	Kagita Venkata Krishna Prasad	YSRCP	Jogi Ramesh	JSP	Ankem Lakshmi Srinivas
Krishna	75	Machilipatnam	TDP	Kollu Ravindra	YSRCP	Perni Nani	JSP	Bandi Ramakrishna
Krishna	76	Avanigadda	TDP	Mandali Buddha Prasad	YSRCP	Simhadri Ramesh Babu	JSP	Muttamshetty Krishna Rao
Krishna	77	Pamarru (SC)	TDP	Uppuleti Kalpana	YSRCP	Kaile Anil Kumar	BSP	Medepalli Jhansi Rani
Krishna	78	Penamaluru	TDP	Bode Prasad	YSRCP	Kolusu Parthasarathy	BSP	Lanka Karunakar Das
Krishna	79	Vijayawada West	TDP	Shabana Khathun	YSRCP	Vellampalli Srinivas	JSP	Pothina Venkata Mahesh
Krishna	80	Vijayawada Central	TDP	Bonda Umamaheswara Rao	YSRCP	Malladi Vishnu	CPI(M)	Chigurupati Babu Rao
Krishna	81	Vijayawada East	TDP	Gadde Rama Mohan	YSRCP	Boppana Bhav Kumar	JSP	Batthina Ramu
Krishna	82	Mylavaram	TDP	Devineni Uma Maheswara Rao	YSRCP	Vasantha Krishna Prasad	JSP	Akkala Rammohan Rao
Krishna	83	Nandigama (SC)	TDP	Tangirala Sowmya	YSRCP	Monditoka Jagan Mohana Rao	BSP	Batchalakura Pushpa Raju
Krishna	84	Jaggayyapeta	TDP	Rajagopal Sreeram	YSRCP	Samineni Udayabhanu	JSP	Dharanikota Venkataramana
Guntur	85	Pedakurapadu	TDP	Kommalapati Sridhar	YSRCP	Namburu Sankara Rao	JSP	Putty Samrajyam
Guntur	86	Tadikonda (SC)	TDP	Tenali Sravan Kumar	YSRCP	Undavalli Sridevi	BSP	Neelam Ravi Kiran
Guntur	87	Mangalagiri	TDP	Nara Lokesh	YSRCP	Alla Ramakrishna Reddy	CPI	Muppalla Nageswar Rao
Guntur	88	Ponnuru	TDP	Dhulipalla Narendra Kumar	YSRCP	Kilari Venkata Rosaiah	JSP	Boni Pravathi Naidu
Guntur	89	Vemuru (SC)	TDP	Nakka Ananda Babu	YSRCP	Merugu Nagarjuna	JSP	A. Bharat Bhushan
Guntur	90	Repalle	TDP	Anagani Satya Prasad	YSRCP	Mopidevi Venkata Ramana	JSP	Kamatham Sambasiva Rao
Guntur	91	Tenali	TDP	Alapati Rajendra Prasad	YSRCP	Annabathuni Siva Kumar	JSP	Nadendla Manohar
Guntur	92	Bapatla	TDP	Annam Satish Prabhakar	YSRCP	Kona Raghupathi	JSP	Ikkurthi Lakshmi Narasimha
Guntur	93	Prathipadu (Guntur) (SC)	TDP	Dokka Manikya Vara Prasad	YSRCP	Mekathoti Sucharita	JSP	Ravela Kishore Babu
Guntur	94	Guntur West	TDP	Maddali Giridhar Rao	YSRCP	Chandragiri Yesuratnam	JSP	Thota Chandrasekhar
Guntur	95	Guntur East	TDP	Mohammad Nasir	YSRCP	Mustafa Shaik	JSP	Shaik Jia Ur Rehman
Guntur	96	Chilakaluripet	TDP	Prathipati Pulla Rao	YSRCP	Vidadala Rajini	JSP	Gade Nageswara Rao
Guntur	97	Narasaraopet	TDP	Aravinda Babu	YSRCP	Gopireddy Srinivasa Reddy	JSP	Syed Jilani
Guntur	98	Sattenapalle	TDP	Kodela Siva Prasada Rao	YSRCP	Ambati Rambabu	JSP	Y. Venkateswara Reddy
Guntur	99	Vinukonda	TDP	G. V. Anjaneyulu	YSRCP	Bolla Brahma Naidu	JSP	Chenna Srinivas Rao
Guntur	100	Gurajala	TDP	Yarapathineni Srinivasa Rao	YSRCP	Kasu Mahesh Reddy	JSP	Chintalapudi Srinivas
Guntur	101	Macherla	TDP	Annapareddy Anji Reddy	YSRCP	Pinnelli Ramakrishna Reddy	JSP	M. Srinivas Yadav
Prakasam	102	Yerragondapalem (SC)	TDP	Budhala Ajita Rao	YSRCP	Audimulapu Suresh	JSP	Gautam
Prakasam	103	Darsi	TDP	Kadiri Baburao	YSRCP	Madisetty Venugopal	JSP	Botuku Ramesh
Prakasam	104	Parchur	TDP	Yeluri Sambasiva Rao	YSRCP	Daggubati Venkateswara Rao	BSP	Pedapudi Vijay Kumar
Prakasam	105	Addanki	TDP	Gottipati Ravi Kumar	YSRCP	Bachina Chenchu Garataiah	JSP	Kancharla Sri Krishna
Prakasam	106	Chirala	TDP	Karanam Balaram	YSRCP	Amanchi Krishna Mohan	BSP	Katta Vinay Kumar
Prakasam	107	Santhanuthalapadu (SC)	TDP	B. N. Vijay Kumar	YSRCP	T. J. R. Sudhakar Babu	CPI(M)	Jala Anjaiah
Prakasam	108	Ongole	TDP	Damacharla Janardhan	YSRCP	Balineni Srinivasa Reddy	JSP	Shaik Riyaz
Prakasam	109	Kandukur	TDP	Pothula Rama Rao	YSRCP	Manugunta Maheedhar Reddy	JSP	Puli Mallikarjun Rao
Prakasam	110	Kondapi (SC)	TDP	Dola Sree Bala Veeranjaneya Swamy	YSRCP	M. Venkaiah	BSP	Kaki Prasad
Prakasam	111	Markapuram	TDP	Kandula Narayana Reddy	YSRCP	K. P. Nagarjuna Reddy	JSP	Immadi Kashinath
Prakasam	112	Giddalur	TDP	Ashok Reddy	YSRCP	Anna Venakata Rambabu	JSP	Bairaboina Chandrasekhar Yadav
Prakasam	113	Kanigiri	TDP	Mukku Ugra Narasimha Reddy	YSRCP	Burra Madhusudan Yadav	CPI	M. L. Narayana
Nellore	114	Kavali	TDP	K. Vishnu Vardhan Reddy	YSRCP	Ramireddy Pratapkumar Reddy	JSP	Pasupuleti Sudhakar
Nellore	115	Atmakur	TDP	Bollineni Krishnaiah	YSRCP	Mekapati Goutham Reddy	BSP	Mandala Padmaja
Nellore	116	Kovur	TDP	Polamreddy Srinivasa Reddy	YSRCP	Nallapa Reddy Prasanna Kumar Reddy	JSP	T. Raghaviah
Nellore	117	Nellore City	TDP	Ponguru Narayana	YSRCP	Anil Kumar Poluboina	JSP	Vinod Reddy Kethamreddy
Nellore	118	Nellore Rural	TDP	Abdul Azeez	YSRCP	Kotamreddy Sridhar Reddy	JSP	Chennareddy Manukrant Reddy
Nellore	119	Sarvepalli	TDP	Somireddy Chandra Mohan Reddy	YSRCP	Kakani Govardhan Reddy	JSP	Srimathi Sunkara Hemalatha
Nellore	120	Gudur (SC)	TDP	Pasam Sunil Kumar	YSRCP	Varaprasad Rao Velagapalli	BSP	Pattapu Ravi
Nellore	121	Sullurpeta (SC)	TDP	Parsa Venkata Ratnam	YSRCP	Kiliveti Sanjeevaiah	JSP	Uyyala Praveen
Nellore	122	Venkatagiri	TDP	Kurugondla Ramakrishna	YSRCP	Anam Ramanarayana Reddy	BSP	Pallipati Raja
Nellore	123	Udayagiri	TDP	Bollineni Ramarao	YSRCP	Mekapati Chandrasekhar Reddy	Did not contest	
Kadapa	124	Badvel (SC)	TDP	Obulapuram Rajasekhar	YSRCP	Gunthoti Venkata Subbaiah	BSP	Nagipogu Prasad
Kadapa	125	Rajampet	TDP	Bathyala Chengal Rayudu	YSRCP	Meda Venkata Mallikarjuna Reddy	JSP	Pathipati Kusuma Kumari
Kadapa	126	Kadapa	TDP	Ameer Babu Nawabjan	YSRCP	Amzath Basha Sheik Bepari	JSP	Sunkara Sreenivas
Kadapa	127	Kodur (SC)	TDP	Narasimha Prasad	YSRCP	Koramutla Sreenivasulu	JSP	Bonasi Venkata Subbaiah
Kadapa	128	Rayachoti	TDP	Ramesh Kumar Reddy	YSRCP	Gadikota Srikanth Reddy	JSP	S. K. Hasan Basha
Kadapa	129	Pulivendula	TDP	Satish Reddy	YSRCP	Y. S. Jagan Mohan Reddy	JSP	Tupakula Chandrashekhar
Kadapa	130	Kamalapuram	TDP	Puttha Narasimha Reddy	YSRCP	Pochimareddy Ravindranatha Reddy	BSP	Obaiah Gudisenapalli
Kadapa	131	Jammalamadugu	TDP	Rama Subba Reddy	YSRCP	Mule Sudheer Reddy	JSP	Arigela Chinnagiri Vinay Kumar
Kadapa	132	Proddatur	TDP	Mallela Linga Reddy	YSRCP	Rachamallu Siva Prasad Reddy	JSP	Inja Somasekhar Reddy
Kadapa	133	Mydukur	TDP	Putta Sudhakar Yadav	YSRCP	Settipalli Raghurami Reddy	JSP	Pandhiti Malhotra
Kurnool	134	Allagadda	TDP	Bhuma Akhila Priya	YSRCP	Gangula Brijendra Reddy	JSP	Sulam Ramakrishnudu
Kurnool	135	Srisailam	TDP	Budda Rajasekhar Reddy	YSRCP	Silpa Chakrapani Reddy	JSP	Sajjala Sujala
Kurnool	136	Nandikotkur (SC)	TDP	Bandi Jayaraju	YSRCP	Thoguru Arthur	JSP	Annapureddy Bala Venkat
Kurnool	137	Kurnool	TDP	T. G. Bharath	YSRCP	Abdul Hafeez Khan	CPI(M)	T. Shadrak
Kurnool	138	Panyam	TDP	Gowru Charitha Reddy	YSRCP	Katasani Rambhupal Reddy	JSP	Chinta Suresh
Kurnool	139	Nandyal	TDP	Bhuma Brahmananda Reddy	YSRCP	Silpa Ravi Chandra Kishore Reddy	JSP	Sajjala Sridhar Reddy
Kurnool	140	Banaganapalle	TDP	B. C. Janardhan Reddy	YSRCP	Katasani Rami Reddy	JSP	Sujjala Aravind Rani
Kurnool	141	Dhone	TDP	K. E. Pratap	YSRCP	Buggana Rajendranath Reddy	CPI	K. Ramanjaneyulu
Kurnool	142	Pattikonda	TDP	K. E. Shyam Kumar	YSRCP	Kangati Sreedevi	JSP	K. L. Murthy
Kurnool	143	Kodumur (SC)	TDP	B. Ramanjaneyulu	YSRCP	Jaradoddi Sudhakar	BSP	Arekanti Jeevanraj
Kurnool	144	Yemmiganur	TDP	B. V. Jayanageswara Reddy	YSRCP	K. Chennakesava Reddy	JSP	Rekha Goud
Kurnool	145	Mantralayam	TDP	P. Thikkareddy	YSRCP	Y. Balanagi Reddy	JSP	Boya Lakshman
Kurnool	146	Adoni	TDP	Konka Meenakshi Naidu	YSRCP	Y. Sai Prasad Reddy	JSP	Mallikarjuna Rao
Kurnool	147	Alur	TDP	Kotla Sujatamma	YSRCP	Gummanur Jayaram	JSP	S. Venkappa
Anantapur	148	Rayadurg	TDP	Kalava Srinivasulu	YSRCP	Kapu Ramachandra Reddy	JSP	Karegowdra Manjunath Gowda
Anantapur	149	Uravakonda	TDP	Payyavula Keshav	YSRCP	Y. Visweswara Reddy	JSP	Sake Ravikumar
Anantapur	150	Guntakal	TDP	R. Jithendra Goud	YSRCP	Y. Venkatarama Reddy	JSP	Kotrike Madhusudan Gupta
Anantapur	151	Tadipatri	TDP	J. C. Ashmit Reddy	YSRCP	Kethireddy Peddareddy	JSP	Kadiri Srikanth Reddy
Anantapur	152	Singanamala (SC)	TDP	Bandaru Sravani Sree	YSRCP	Jonnalagadda Padmavathy	BSP	Midde Ravindra Babu
Anantapur	153	Anantapur Urban	TDP	Prabhakar Chowdary	YSRCP	Anantha Venkatarami Reddy	JSP	T. C. Varun
Anantapur	154	Kalyandurg	TDP	Madineni Umamaheswara Naidu	YSRCP	K. V. Ushashri Charan	JSP	Karanam Rahul
Anantapur	155	Raptadu	TDP	Paritala Sriram	YSRCP	Thopudurthi Prakash Reddy	JSP	Sake Pavan Kumar
Anantapur	156	Madakasira (SC)	TDP	K. Errana	YSRCP	M. Thippeswamy	BSP	Hanumantha Rayappa
Anantapur	157	Hindupur	TDP	Nandamuri Balakrishna	YSRCP	K. Iqbal Ahmed Khan	JSP	Akula Umesh
Anantapur	158	Penukonda	TDP	B. K. Parthasarathi	YSRCP	Malagundla Sankaranarayana	JSP	Peddi Reddy Varalakshmi
Anantapur	159	Puttaparthi	TDP	Palle Raghunatha Reddy	YSRCP	Duddukunta Sreedhar Reddy	JSP	Patti Chalapathi
Anantapur	160	Dharmavaram	TDP	Varadapuram Suri	YSRCP	Kethireddy Venkatarami Reddy	JSP	Madhusudhan Reddy
Anantapur	161	Kadiri	TDP	Kandikunta Venkata Prasad	YSRCP	P. V. Sidda Reddy	JSP	P. Bairava Prasad
Chittoor	162	Thamballapalle	TDP	Shankar Yadav	YSRCP	Peddireddy Dwarakanatha Reddy	JSP	Malipeddi Prabhakar Reddy
Chittoor	163	Pileru	TDP	Nallari Kishore Kumar Reddy	YSRCP	Chintala Ramachandra Reddy	JSP	B. Dinesh
Chittoor	164	Madanapalle	TDP	Dommalapati Ramesh	YSRCP	M. Nawaz Basha	JSP	Gangarapu Swathi
Chittoor	165	Punganur	TDP	Anisha Reddy	YSRCP	Peddireddy Ramachandra Reddy	JSP	Bode Ramachandra Yadav
Chittoor	166	Chandragiri	TDP	Pulivarthi Nani	YSRCP	Chevireddy Bhaskar Reddy	JSP	Setty Surendra
Chittoor	167	Tirupati	TDP	M. Suguna	YSRCP	Bhumana Karunakar Reddy	JSP	Chadalavada Krishnamurthy
Chittoor	168	Srikalahasti	TDP	Bojjala Sudhir Reddy	YSRCP	Biyyapu Madhusudhan Reddy	JSP	Vinutha Nagaram
Chittoor	169	Sathyavedu (SC)	TDP	J. D. Rajasekhar	YSRCP	Koneti Adimulam	BSP	N. Vijay Kumar
Chittoor	170	Nagari	TDP	Gali Bhanu Prakash	YSRCP	R. K. Roja	BSP	Naganaboyina Pravallika Yadav
Chittoor	171	Gangadhara Nellore (SC)	TDP	Anaganti Harikrishna	YSRCP	K. Narayana Swamy	JSP	Ponnu Yugandhar
Chittoor	172	Chittoor	TDP	A. S. Manohar	YSRCP	Arani Srinivasulu	JSP	N. Daya Ram
Chittoor	173	Puthalapattu (SC)	TDP	Lalitha Kumari	YSRCP	M. S. Babu	BSP	M. Jagapathi
Chittoor	174	Palamaner	TDP	N. Amarnath Reddy	YSRCP	N. Venkatiah Gowda	JSP	Poluru Srikanth Naidu
Chittoor	175	Kuppam	TDP	N. Chandrababu Naidu	YSRCP	K. Chandramouli	JSP	Muddhineni Venkataramana

== Results ==
The results were announced on 23 May 2019, the day of the counting of ballots. YSRCP emerged as the single largest party with 151 seats. YSRCP swept the districts of Kadapa, Kurnool, Nellore, and Vizianagaram. The incumbent TDP bagged 23 seats whereas the JSP+ alliance managed to win a single seat Razole while the leader of the alliance Pawan Kalyan lost both the seats in Gajuwaka and Bhimavaram. The national parties INC and BJP were not able to win a single seat.

TDP candidate lost their security deposit in 1 out of 175 seats contested, JSP candidates lost security deposit in 121 out of 137 seats contested, BJP candidates lost security deposit in 173 out of 173 seats contested, Congress candidates lost security deposit in 174 out of 174 seats contested.

The JSP chief Pawan Kalyan also alleged that the YSRCP had come into the power through EVM malpractice.

151	23	1
YSRCP	TDP	JSP

=== Vote share ===
Vote share by party
1. YSR Congress Party (50.0%)
2. Telugu Desam Party (39.2%)
3. Janasena Party (5.53%)
4. Others (5.35%)

=== Seat share ===
Seat share by party
1. YSR Congress Party (86.3%)
2. Telugu Desam Party (13.1%)
3. Janasena Party (0.57%)

=== Results by party ===
Source:Election Commission of India
Alliance/Party		Popular vote			Seats		
Alliance/Party		Votes	%	±pp	Contested	Won	+/−
YSR Congress Party		15,688,569	49.95	▲5.35	175	151	▲84
Telugu Desam Party		12,304,668	39.17	▼5.73	175	23	▼79
JSP+	Janasena Party	1,736,811	5.53	new	137	1	new
JSP+	Communist Party of India (Marxist)	101,071	0.32	▼0.18	7	0	Steady
JSP+	Bahujan Samaj Party	88,264	0.28	▼0.42	21	0	Steady
JSP+	Communist Party of India	34,746	0.11	▼0.19	7	0	Steady
JSP+	Total	1,960,892	6.24	N/A	172	1	N/A
Indian National Congress		368,810	1.17	▼1.16	174	0	Steady
Bharatiya Janata Party		263,849	0.84	▼1.36	173	0	▼4
Other parties		536,164	0.44	N/A	129	0	N/A
Independents		286,859	0.91	▼0.89	754	0	▼2
NOTA		401,315	1.28	▲0.78			
Total		31,409,811	100.00	N/A	1,752	175	N/A
Vote statistics
Valid votes		31,409,811	99.15				
Invalid votes		270,252	0.85				
Votes cast/Turnout		31,680,063	80.39				
Abstentions		7,725,874	19.61				
Registered voters		39,405,937					

=== Results by region ===
Region	Seats												
Region	Seats	YSRCP		TDP		JSP+		INC		BJP		Others (Note: Others comprises NOTA and all remaining unrecognized parties and Independents)	
Region	Seats	Seats	Vote (%)	Seats	Vote (%)	Seats	Vote (%)	Seats	Vote (%)	Seats	Vote (%)	Seats	Vote (%)
North Coastal Andhra (Note: Includes Srikakulam, Visakhapatnam and Vizianagaram districts)	34	28	47.62%	6	39.16%	0	5.94%	0	1.21%	0	1.48%	0	4.58%
Godavari (Note: Includes East Godavari and West Godavari districts)	34	27	44.74%	6	36.56%	1	14.46%	0	0.99%	0	0.69%	0	2.57%
Amaravati–APCR (Note: Includes Guntur and Krishna districts)	33	29	47.78%	4	41.72%	0	6.91%	0	0.96%	0	0.66%	0	1.98%
South Coastal Andhra (Note: Includes Prakasam and Nellore districts)	22	18	53.38%	4	40.78%	0	2.40%	0	0.82%	0	0.68%	0	1.92%
Rayalaseema (Note: Includes Ananthapuramu, Chittoor, Kadapa and Kurnool districts)	52	49	54.61%	3	38.48%	0	2.41%	0	1.57%	0	0.74%	0	2.18%
Total	175	151	49.95%	23	39.17%	1	6.24%	0	1.17%	0	0.84%	0	2.62%

=== Results by district ===
District	Seats												
District	Seats	YSRCP		TDP		JSP+		INC		BJP		Others	
District	Seats	Seats	Vote (%)	Seats	Vote (%)	Seats	Vote (%)	Seats	Vote (%)	Seats	Vote (%)	Seats	Vote (%)
Srikakulam	10	8	49.31%	2	42.67%	0	3.18%	0	1.23%	0	0.74%	0	2.86%
Vizianagaram	9	9	51.58%	0	39.47%	0	3.28%	0	1.20%	0	1.26%	0	3.22%
Visakhapatnam	15	11	44.26%	4	36.74%	0	9.26%	0	2.08%	0	1.21%	0	6.46%
East Godavari	19	14	43.48%	4	36.76%	1	15.38%	0	0.98%	0	0.75%	0	2.66%
West Godavari	15	13	46.35%	2	36.30%	0	13.28%	0	1.00%	0	0.62%	0	2.45%
Krishna	16	14	46.79%	2	41.50%	0	7.45%	0	0.97%	0	0.76%	0	2.53%
Guntur	17	15	48.64%	2	41.90%	0	6.44%	0	0.95%	0	0.57%	0	1.49%
Prakasam	12	8	52.32%	4	42.47%	0	2.28%	0	0.75%	0	0.38%	0	1.80%
Nellore	10	10	54.70%	0	38.69%	0	2.56%	0	0.91%	0	1.06%	0	2.08%
Kadapa	10	10	60.34%	0	34.11%	0	1.69%	0	1.25%	0	0.66%	0	1.96%
Kurnool	14	14	55.32%	0	38.01%	0	2.13%	0	1.28%	0	0.86%	0	2.38%
Anantapur	14	12	51.60%	2	41.29%	0	2.36%	0	2.20%	0	0.62%	0	1.94%
Chittoor	14	13	53.25%	1	38.92%	0	3.21%	0	1.42%	0	0.80%	0	2.40%
Total	175	151	49.95%	23	39.17%	1	6.24%	0	1.17%	0	0.84%	0	2.62%

=== Results by constituency ===
District	Constituency		Winner				Runner Up				Margin
District	No.	Name	Candidate	Party	Votes	%	Candidate	Party	Votes	%	Margin
Srikakulam	1	Ichchapuram	Ashok Bendalam	TDP	79,992	46.39	Piriya Sairaj	YSRCP	72,847	42.25	7,145
Srikakulam	2	Palasa	Seediri Appalaraju	YSRCP	76,603	50.83	Gouthu Sireesha	TDP	60,351	40.05	16,247
Srikakulam	3	Tekkali	Kinjarapu Atchannaidu	TDP	87,658	49.64	Perada Tilak	YSRCP	79,113	44.80	8,545
Srikakulam	4	Pathapatnam	Reddy Shanthi	YSRCP	76,941	50.42	Kalamata Venkata Ramana Murthy	TDP	61,390	40.23	15,551
Srikakulam	5	Srikakulam	Dharmana Prasada Rao	YSRCP	84,084	47.43	Gunda Lakshmi Devi	TDP	78,307	44.17	5,777
Srikakulam	6	Amadalavalasa	Thammineni Seetharam	YSRCP	77,897	51.91	Koona Ravi Kumar	TDP	63,906	42.58	13,991
Srikakulam	7	Etcherla	Gorle Kiran Kumar	YSRCP	99,672	51.02	Kimidi Kalavenkata Rao	TDP	80,961	41.44	18,711
Srikakulam	8	Narasannapeta	Dharmana Krishna Das	YSRCP	85,622	51.81	Baggu Ramanamurthy	TDP	66,597	40.14	19,025
Srikakulam	9	Rajam (SC)	Kambala Jogulu	YSRCP	83,561	51.41	Kondru Murali Mohan	TDP	66,713	41.05	16,848
Srikakulam	10	Palakonda (ST)	Viswasarayi Kalavathi	YSRCP	72,054	52.70	Nimmaka Jaya Krishna	TDP	54,074	39.55	17,980
Vizianagaram	11	Kurupam (ST)	Pamula Pushpa Sreevani	YSRCP	74,527	52.02	T. V. V. T. Narasimha Priya	TDP	47,925	33.45	26,602
Vizianagaram	12	Parvathipuram (SC)	Alajangi Jogarao	YSRCP	75,304	53.53	Bobbili Chiranjeevulu	TDP	51,105	36.33	24,199
Vizianagaram	13	Salur (ST)	Peedika Rajanna Dora	YSRCP	78,430	51.70	R. P. Bhanj Deo	TDP	58,401	38.49	20,029
Vizianagaram	14	Bobbili	S. V. Appala Naidu	YSRCP	84,955	48.70	R. V. Sujay Krishna Ranga Rao	TDP	76,603	43.91	8,352
Vizianagaram	15	Cheepurupalli	Botsa Satyanarayana	YSRCP	89,262	53.81	Kimidi Nagarjuna	TDP	62,764	37.84	26,498
Vizianagaram	16	Gajapathinagaram	B. Appalanarasayya	YSRCP	93,270	54.12	Kondapalli Appala Naidu	TDP	66,259	38.45	27,011
Vizianagaram	17	Nellimarla	Baddukonda Appala Naidu	YSRCP	94,258	53.11	Pathivada Narayanaswamy Naidu	TDP	66,207	37.31	28,051
Vizianagaram	18	Vizianagaram	Veera Bhadra Swamy Kolagatla	YSRCP	78,849	47.96	Pusapati Aditi Vijayalakshmi	TDP	72,432	44.05	6,417
Vizianagaram	19	Srungavarapukota	Kadubandi Srinivasa Rao	YSRCP	91,451	49.73	Kolla Lalitha Kumari	TDP	80,086	43.55	11,365
Visakhapatnam	20	Bhimili	Avanthi Srinivas	YSRCP	101,629	44.21	Sabbam Hari	TDP	91,917	39.98	9,712
Visakhapatnam	21	Visakhapatnam East	Velagapudi Ramakrishna Babu	TDP	87,073	50.10	Akkaramani Vijaya Nirmala	YSRCP	60,599	34.87	26,474
Visakhapatnam	22	Visakhapatnam South	Vasupalli Ganesh Kumar	TDP	52,172	41.50	Dronamraju Srinivasa Rao	YSRCP	48,443	38.54	3,729
Visakhapatnam	23	Visakhapatnam North	Ganta Srinivasa Rao	TDP	67,352	38.09	Kammila Kannaparaju	YSRCP	65,408	36.99	1,944
Visakhapatnam	24	Visakhapatnam West	P. G. V. R. Naidu	TDP	68,699	50.96	Malla Vijay Prasad	YSRCP	49,718	36.88	18,981
Visakhapatnam	25	Gajuwaka	Tippala Nagireddy	YSRCP	75,292	37.78	Pawan Kalyan	JSP	58,539	29.37	16,753
Visakhapatnam	26	Chodavaram	Karanam Dharmasri	YSRCP	94,215	53.92	K. S. Naga Sanyasi Raju	TDP	66,578	38.10	27,637
Visakhapatnam	27	Madugula	Budi Mutyala Naidu	YSRCP	78,830	50.99	Gavireddi Ramanaidu	TDP	62,438	40.38	16,392
Visakhapatnam	28	Araku Valley (ST)	Chetti Palguna	YSRCP	53,101	33.70	Donnu Dora Siyyari	AIFB	27,660	17.55	25,441
Visakhapatnam	29	Paderu (ST)	Kottagulli Bhagya Lakshmi	YSRCP	71,153	50.60	Giddi Eswari	TDP	28,349	20.16	42,804
Visakhapatnam	30	Anakapalle	Gudivada Amarnath	YSRCP	73,207	45.97	Peela Govinda Satyanarayana	TDP	65,038	40.84	8,169
Visakhapatnam	31	Pendurthi	Annamreddy Adeep Raj	YSRCP	99,759	49.79	Bandaru Satyanarayana Murthy	TDP	70,899	35.38	28,860
Visakhapatnam	32	Elamanchili	Kanna Babu	YSRCP	71,934	42.62	Panchakarla Ramesh Babu	TDP	67,788	40.17	4,146
Visakhapatnam	33	Payakaraopet (SC)	Golla Baburao	YSRCP	98,745	50.45	B. Bangaraiah	TDP	67,556	34.52	31,189
Visakhapatnam	34	Narsipatnam	Petla Uma Sankara Ganesh	YSRCP	93,818	53.82	Chintakayala Ayyanna Patrudu	TDP	70,452	40.41	23,366
East Godavari	35	Tuni	Dadisetti Raja	YSRCP	92,459	52.13	Yanamala Rama Krishnudu	TDP	68,443	38.59	24,016
East Godavari	36	Prathipadu	Parvatha Purnachandra Prasad	YSRCP	76,574	46.75	Varupula Raja	TDP	71,908	43.96	4,666
East Godavari	37	Pithapuram	Dorababu Pendem	YSRCP	83,459	44.71	S. V. S. N. Varma	TDP	68,467	36.68	14,992
East Godavari	38	Kakinada Rural	Kurasala Kannababu	YSRCP	74,068	40.14	Pilli Anantha Lakshmi	TDP	65,279	35.38	8,789
East Godavari	39	Peddapuram	Nimmakayala Chinarajappa	TDP	67,393	41.36	Thota Saraswathi Vani	YSRCP	63,366	38.89	4,027
East Godavari	40	Anaparthy	Sathi Suryanarayana Reddy	YSRCP	111,771	59.86	Ramakrishna Reddy Nallamilli	TDP	56,564	30.30	55,207
East Godavari	41	Kakinada City	Dwarampudi Chandra Sekhara Reddy	YSRCP	73,890	43.06	Vanamadi Venkateswara Rao	TDP	59,779	34.84	14,111
East Godavari	42	Ramachandrapuram	C. S. Venugopalakrishna	YSRCP	75,365	44.62	Thota Trimurthulu	TDP	70,197	41.56	5,168
East Godavari	43	Mummidivaram	Ponnada Venkata Satish Kumar	YSRCP	78,522	40.89	Datla Subbaraju	TDP	72,975	38.00	5,547
East Godavari	44	Amalapuram (SC)	Pinipe Viswarup	YSRCP	72,003	42.51	Aithabathula Ananda Rao	TDP	46,349	27.36	25,654
East Godavari	45	Razole (SC)	Rapaka Vara Prasada Rao	JSP	50,053	33.46	Bonthu Rajeswara Rao	YSRCP	49,239	32.91	814
East Godavari	46	Gannavaram (SC)	Kondeti Chittibabu	YSRCP	67,373	43.13	Nelapudi Stalinbabu	TDP	45,166	28.91	22,207
East Godavari	47	Kothapeta	Chirla Jaggireddy	YSRCP	82,645	40.52	Bandaru Satyananda Rao	TDP	78,607	38.54	4,038
East Godavari	48	Mandapeta	V. Jogeswara Rao	TDP	78,029	41.85	Pilli Subhash Chandra Bose	YSRCP	67,429	36.17	10,600
East Godavari	49	Rajanagaram	Jakkampudi Raja	YSRCP	90,680	51.29	Pendurthi Venkatesh	TDP	58,908	33.32	31,772
East Godavari	50	Rajahmundry City	Adireddy Bhavani	TDP	83,702	49.94	Routhu Surya Prakasa Rao	YSRCP	53,637	32.00	30,065
East Godavari	51	Rajahmundry Rural	Gorantla Butchaiah Chowdary	TDP	74,166	39.28	Akula Veerraju	YSRCP	63,762	33.77	10,404
East Godavari	52	Jaggampeta	Jyothula Chantibabu	YSRCP	93,496	51.62	Jyothula Nehru	TDP	70,131	38.72	23,365
East Godavari	53	Rampachodavaram (ST)	Nagulapalli Dhanalakshmi	YSRCP	98,318	48.74	Vanthala Rajeswari	TDP	59,212	29.31	39,106
West Godavari	54	Kovvur (SC)	Taneti Vanitha	YSRCP	79,892	52.35	Vangalapudi Anitha	TDP	54,644	35.81	25,248
West Godavari	55	Nidadavole	Geddam Srinivas Naidu	YSRCP	81,001	48.19	Burugupalli Sesharao	TDP	59,313	35.29	21,688
West Godavari	56	Achanta	Cherukuvada Sri Ranganadha Raju	YSRCP	66,494	47.92	Pithani Satyanarayana	TDP	53,608	38.64	12,886
West Godavari	57	Palakollu	Nimmala Rama Naidu	TDP	67,549	43.18	C. Satyanarayana Murthy	YSRCP	49,740	31.80	17,809
West Godavari	58	Narasapuram	Mudunuri Prasada Raju	YSRCP	55,556	40.68	Bommidi Narayana Nayakar	JSP	49,120	35.97	6,436
West Godavari	59	Bhimavaram	Grandhi Srinivas	YSRCP	70,642	36.78	Pawan Kalyan	JSP	62,285	32.43	8,357
West Godavari	60	Undi	Mantena Ramaraju	TDP	82,730	44.46	P. V. L. Narasimha Raju	YSRCP	71,781	38.58	10,949
West Godavari	61	Tanuku	Karumuri Venkata Nageswara Rao	YSRCP	75,975	40.31	Arimilli Radha Krishna	TDP	73,780	39.14	2,195
West Godavari	62	Tadepalligudem	Kottu Satyanarayana	YSRCP	70,741	42.17	Eli Venkata Madhusudhan Rao	TDP	54,275	32.35	16,466
West Godavari	63	Unguturu	Puppala Srinivasarao	YSRCP	94,621	54.43	Ganni Veeranjaneyulu	TDP	61,468	35.36	33,153
West Godavari	64	Denduluru	Kotaru Abbaya Chowdary	YSRCP	96,142	51.42	Chintamaneni Prabhakar	TDP	78,683	42.08	17,459
West Godavari	65	Eluru	Alla Nani	YSRCP	72,247	44.73	Badeti Bujji	TDP	68,175	42.21	4,072
West Godavari	66	Gopalapuram (SC)	Talari Venkat Rao	YSRCP	111,785	56.04	Muppidi Venkateswara Rao	TDP	74,324	37.26	37,461
West Godavari	67	Polavaram (ST)	Tellam Balaraju	YSRCP	110,523	51.81	Boragam Srinivasulu	TDP	68,453	32.09	42,070
West Godavari	68	Chintalapudi (SC)	Vunnamatla Rakada Eliza	YSRCP	115,755	53.53	Karra Raja Rao	TDP	79,580	36.80	36,175
Krishna	69	Tiruvuru (SC)	Kokkiligadda Rakshana Nidhi	YSRCP	89,118	50.73	Kothapalli Samuel Jawahar	TDP	78,283	44.56	10,835
Krishna	70	Nuzvid	Meka Venkata Pratap Apparao	YSRCP	101,950	50.84	Muddaraboina Venkateswara Rao	TDP	85,740	42.75	16,210
Krishna	71	Gannavaram (Krishna)	Vallabhaneni Vamsi Mohan	TDP	103,881	47.07	Yarlagadda Venkata Rao	YSRCP	103,043	46.69	838
Krishna	72	Gudivada	Kodali Nani	YSRCP	89,833	53.50	Devineni Avinash	TDP	70,354	41.90	19,479
Krishna	73	Kaikalur	Dulam Nageswara Rao	YSRCP	82,128	47.81	Jayamangala Venkata Ramana	TDP	72,771	42.36	9,357
Krishna	74	Pedana	Jogi Ramesh	YSRCP	61,920	42.46	Kagitha Krishnaprasad	TDP	54,081	37.08	7,839
Krishna	75	Machilipatnam	Perni Nani	YSRCP	66,141	44.36	Kollu Ravindra	TDP	60,290	40.44	5,851
Krishna	76	Avanigadda	Simhadri Ramesh Babu	YSRCP	78,447	42.55	Mandali Buddha Prasad	TDP	57,722	31.31	20,725
Krishna	77	Pamarru (SC)	Kaile Anil Kumar	YSRCP	88,547	56.15	Uppuleti Kalpana	TDP	57,674	36.57	30,873
Krishna	78	Penamaluru	Kolusu Parthasarathy	YSRCP	101,485	47.44	Bode Prasad	TDP	90,168	42.15	11,317
Krishna	79	Vijayawada West	Vellampalli Srinivas	YSRCP	58,435	38.04	Shabana Musarat Khatoon	TDP	50,764	33.04	7,671
Krishna	80	Vijayawada Central	Malladi Vishnu	YSRCP	70,721	39.73	Bonda Umamaheswara Rao	TDP	70,696	39.71	25
Krishna	81	Vijayawada East	Gadde Ramamohan	TDP	82,990	44.40	Boppana Bhava Kumar	YSRCP	67,826	36.29	15,164
Krishna	82	Mylavaram	Vasantha Krishna Prasad	YSRCP	114,940	49.44	Devineni Uma Maheswara Rao	TDP	102,287	43.99	12,653
Krishna	83	Nandigama (SC)	Monditoka Jagan Mohana Rao	YSRCP	87,493	51.32	Tangirala Sowmya	TDP	76,612	44.94	10,881
Krishna	84	Jaggayyapeta	Samineni Udayabhanu	YSRCP	87,965	49.95	Rajagopal Sreeram	TDP	83,187	47.23	4,778
Guntur	85	Pedakurapadu	Namburu Sankara Rao	YSRCP	99,577	50.32	Kommalapati Sridhar	TDP	85,473	43.19	14,104
Guntur	86	Tadikonda (SC)	Undavalli Sridevi	YSRCP	86,848	48.66	Tenali Sravan Kumar	TDP	82,415	46.18	4,433
Guntur	87	Mangalagiri	Alla Rama Krishna Reddy	YSRCP	108,464	47.47	Nara Lokesh	TDP	103,127	45.14	5,337
Guntur	88	Ponnuru	Kilari Venkata Rosaiah	YSRCP	87,570	45.88	Dhulipalla Narendra Kumar	TDP	86,458	45.30	1,112
Guntur	89	Vemuru (SC)	Merugu Nagarjuna	YSRCP	81,671	47.59	Nakka Ananda Babu	TDP	71,672	41.76	9,999
Guntur	90	Repalle	Anagani Satya Prasad	TDP	89,975	48.34	Mopidevi Venkataramana	YSRCP	78,420	42.13	11,555
Guntur	91	Tenali	Annabathuni Siva Kumar	YSRCP	94,495	45.92	Alapati Rajendra Prasad	TDP	76,846	37.35	17,649
Guntur	92	Bapatla	Kona Raghupathi	YSRCP	79,836	51.92	Annam Satish Prabhakar	TDP	64,637	42.04	15,199
Guntur	93	Prathipadu (Guntur) (SC)	Mekathoti Sucharita	YSRCP	92,508	43.98	Dokka Manikya Vara Prasad	TDP	85,110	40.46	7,398
Guntur	94	Guntur West	Maddali Giridhar Rao	TDP	71,864	41.15	Chandragiri Yesuratnam	YSRCP	67,575	38.69	4,289
Guntur	95	Guntur East	Mohammad Musthafa Shaik	YSRCP	77,047	47.70	Mohammed Naseer	TDP	54,956	34.02	22,091
Guntur	96	Chilakaluripet	Vidadala Rajini	YSRCP	94,430	50.20	Prathipati Pulla Rao	TDP	86,129	45.79	8,301
Guntur	97	Narasaraopet	Gopireddy Srinivasa Reddy	YSRCP	100,994	55.12	Chadalavada Aravinda Babu	TDP	68,717	37.52	32,277
Guntur	98	Sattenapalle	Ambati Rambabu	YSRCP	105,063	51.57	Kodela Siva Prasada Rao	TDP	84,187	41.32	20,876
Guntur	99	Vinukonda	Bolla Brahma Naidu	YSRCP	120,703	53.96	G. V. Anjaneyulu	TDP	92,075	41.16	28,628
Guntur	100	Gurajala	Kasu Mahesh Reddy	YSRCP	117,204	52.07	Yarapathineni Srinivasa Rao	TDP	88,591	39.36	28,613
Guntur	101	Macherla	Pinnelli Ramakrishna Reddy	YSRCP	110,406	52.10	Annapureddy Anji Reddy	TDP	88,488	41.76	21,918
Prakasam	102	Yerragondapalem (SC)	Audimulapu Suresh	YSRCP	99,408	56.34	Budala Ajitha Rao	TDP	67,776	38.41	31,632
Prakasam	103	Darsi	Maddisetty Venugopal	YSRCP	111,914	57.29	Kadiri Baburao	TDP	72,857	37.30	39,057
Prakasam	104	Parchur	Yeluri Sambasiva Rao	TDP	97,076	47.78	Daggubati Venkateswara Rao	YSRCP	95,429	46.97	1,647
Prakasam	105	Addanki	Gottipati Ravi Kumar	TDP	105,545	50.86	Chenchu Garataiah Bachina	YSRCP	92,554	44.60	12,991
Prakasam	106	Chirala	Karanam Balaram Krishna Murthy	TDP	83,901	53.27	Amanchi Krishna Mohan	YSRCP	66,482	42.21	17,419
Prakasam	107	Santhanuthalapadu (SC)	T. J. R. Sudhakar Babu	YSRCP	89,160	49.45	B. N. Vijay Kumar	TDP	80,082	44.42	9,078
Prakasam	108	Ongole	Balineni Srinivasa Reddy	YSRCP	101,022	52.08	Damacharla Janardhana Rao	TDP	78,777	40.61	22,245
Prakasam	109	Kandukur	Manugunta Maheedhar Reddy	YSRCP	101,275	51.69	Pothula Rama Rao	TDP	86,339	44.07	14,936
Prakasam	110	Kondapi (SC)	D. S. B. Veeranjaneya Swamy	TDP	98,142	48.26	Madasi Venkaiah	YSRCP	97,118	47.75	1,024
Prakasam	111	Markapuram	Kunduru Nagarjuna Reddy	YSRCP	92,680	52.15	Kandula Narayana Reddy	TDP	74,013	41.65	18,667
Prakasam	112	Giddalur	Anna Rambabu	YSRCP	133,111	67.90	Ashok Reddy Muthumula	TDP	52,076	26.56	81,035
Prakasam	113	Kanigiri	Burra Madhusudan Yadav	YSRCP	112,730	58.48	Mukku Ugra Narasimha Reddy	TDP	71,827	37.26	40,903
Nellore	114	Kavali	Ramireddy Pratap Kumar Reddy	YSRCP	95,828	49.12	Katamreddy Vishnu Vardhan Reddy	TDP	81,711	41.89	14,117
Nellore	115	Atmakur	Mekapati Goutham Reddy	YSRCP	92,758	53.22	Bollineni Krishnaiah	TDP	70,482	40.44	22,276
Nellore	116	Kovur	N. Prasanna Kumar Reddy	YSRCP	116,239	56.55	Polam Reddy Srinivasulu Reddy	TDP	76,348	37.14	39,891
Nellore	117	Nellore City	Anil Kumar Poluboina	YSRCP	75,040	47.38	Ponguru Narayana	TDP	73,052	46.13	1,988
Nellore	118	Nellore Rural	Kotamreddy Sridhar Reddy	YSRCP	85,724	51.61	Abdul Aziz Shaik	TDP	64,948	39.10	20,776
Nellore	119	Sarvepalli	Kakani Govardhan Reddy	YSRCP	97,272	51.36	Somireddy Chandra Mohan Reddy	TDP	83,299	43.98	13,973
Nellore	120	Gudur (SC)	Varaprasad Rao Velagapalli	YSRCP	109,759	59.58	Pasim Sunil Kumar	TDP	64,301	34.90	45,458
Nellore	121	Sullurpeta (SC)	Kiliveti Sanjeevaiah	YSRCP	119,627	61.99	Parasa Venkata Rathnaiah	TDP	58,335	30.23	61,292
Nellore	122	Venkatagiri	Anam Ramanarayana Reddy	YSRCP	109,204	57.26	Kurugondla Ramakrishna	TDP	70,484	36.96	38,720
Nellore	123	Udayagiri	Mekapati Chandrasekhar Reddy	YSRCP	106,487	57.31	Bollineni Venkata Ramarao	TDP	69,959	37.65	36,528
Kadapa	124	Badvel (SC)	G. Venkata Subbaiah	YSRCP	95,482	60.89	Obulapuram Raja Sekhar	TDP	50,748	32.36	44,734
Kadapa	125	Rajampet	Meda Venkata Mallikarjuna Reddy	YSRCP	95,266	57.76	Bathyala Changal Rayudu	TDP	59,994	36.39	35,272
Kadapa	126	Kadapa	Amzath Basha Shaik Bepari	YSRCP	104,822	62.89	Ameer Babu Nawabjan	TDP	50,028	30.01	54,794
Kadapa	127	Kodur (SC)	Koramutla Sreenivasulu	YSRCP	78,312	57.26	Panthagani Narasimha Prasad	TDP	43,433	31.76	34,879
Kadapa	128	Rayachoti	Gadikota Srikanth Reddy	YSRCP	98,990	56.94	R. Ramesh Kumar Reddy	TDP	66,128	38.04	32,862
Kadapa	129	Pulivendla	Y. S. Jagan Mohan Reddy	YSRCP	132,356	73.48	Singareddy Satish Reddy	TDP	42,246	23.45	90,110
Kadapa	130	Kamalapuram	Pochimareddy Ravindranath Reddy	YSRCP	88,482	55.88	Putha Narasimha Reddy	TDP	61,149	38.62	27,333
Kadapa	131	Jammalamadugu	Mule Sudheer Reddy	YSRCP	125,005	61.31	P. Rama Subba Reddy	TDP	73,364	35.98	51,641
Kadapa	132	Proddatur	Rachamallu Siva Prasad Reddy	YSRCP	107,941	59.21	Mallela Linga Reddy	TDP	64,793	35.54	43,148
Kadapa	133	Mydukur	Settipalli Raghurami Reddy	YSRCP	94,849	56.03	Putta Sudhakar Yadav	TDP	65,505	38.69	29,344
Kurnool	134	Allagadda	Gangula Brijendra Reddy	YSRCP	105,905	57.03	Bhuma Akhila Priya	TDP	70,292	37.85	35,613
Kurnool	135	Srisailam	Silpa Chakrapani Reddy	YSRCP	92,236	60.41	Budda Rajasekhar Reddy	TDP	53,538	35.07	38,698
Kurnool	136	Nandikotkur (SC)	Thoguru Arthur	YSRCP	102,565	59.45	Bandi Jayaraju	TDP	61,955	35.91	40,610
Kurnool	137	Kurnool	Abdul Hafeez Khan	YSRCP	72,819	47.70	T. G. Bharath	TDP	67,466	44.19	5,353
Kurnool	138	Panyam	Katasani Rambhupal Reddy	YSRCP	122,476	56.78	Gowru Charitha Reddy	TDP	78,619	36.45	43,857
Kurnool	139	Nandyal	Silpa Ravi Chandra Kishore Reddy	YSRCP	108,868	55.13	Bhuma Brahmananda Reddy	TDP	74,308	37.63	34,560
Kurnool	140	Banaganapalle	Katasani Rami Reddy	YSRCP	99,998	51.28	B. C. Janardhan Reddy	TDP	86,614	44.41	13,384
Kurnool	141	Dhone	Buggana Rajendranath	YSRCP	100,845	57.79	K. E. Prathap	TDP	65,329	37.44	35,516
Kurnool	142	Pattikonda	Kangati Sreedevi	YSRCP	100,981	59.83	K. E. Shyam Kumar	TDP	58,916	34.91	42,065
Kurnool	143	Kodumur (SC)	Jaradoddi Sudhakar	YSRCP	95,037	56.58	Burla Ramanjaneyulu	TDP	58,992	35.12	36,045
Kurnool	144	Yemmiganur	K. Chennakesava Reddy	YSRCP	96,498	53.28	B. Jaya Nageswara Reddy	TDP	70,888	39.14	25,610
Kurnool	145	Mantralayam	Y. Balanagi Reddy	YSRCP	86,896	54.53	Palakurthi Thikka Reddy	TDP	63,017	39.55	23,879
Kurnool	146	Adoni	Y. Sai Prasad Reddy	YSRCP	74,109	47.11	Konka Meenakshi Naidu	TDP	61,790	39.28	12,319
Kurnool	147	Alur	Gummanur Jayaram	YSRCP	107,101	56.57	Kotla Sujathamma	TDP	67,205	35.50	39,896
Anantapur	148	Rayadurg	Kapu Ramachandra Reddy	YSRCP	109,043	50.46	Kalava Srinivasulu	TDP	94,994	43.96	14,049
Anantapur	149	Uravakonda	Payyavula Keshav	TDP	90,209	48.30	Y. Visweswara Reddy	YSRCP	88,077	47.16	2,132
Anantapur	150	Guntakal	Y. Venkatarama Reddy	YSRCP	106,922	55.96	R. Jitendra Gowd	TDP	58,390	30.56	48,532
Anantapur	151	Tadipatri	K. Pedda Reddy	YSRCP	92,911	49.45	J. C. Ashmit Reddy	TDP	85,400	45.46	7,511
Anantapur	152	Singanamala (SC)	Jonnalagadda Padmavathy	YSRCP	118,044	59.78	Bandaru Sravani Sree	TDP	71,802	36.36	46,242
Anantapur	153	Anantapur Urban	Anantha Venkatarami Reddy	YSRCP	88,704	53.71	V. Prabhakar Chowdary	TDP	60,006	36.34	28,698
Anantapur	154	Kalyandurg	K. V. Ushashri Charan	YSRCP	88,051	46.14	Madineni Umamaheswara Naidu	TDP	68,155	35.71	19,896
Anantapur	155	Raptadu	Thopudurthi Prakash Reddy	YSRCP	111,201	55.00	Paritala Sreeram	TDP	85,626	42.35	25,575
Anantapur	156	Madakasira (SC)	M. Thippeswamy	YSRCP	88,527	49.99	K. Eranna	TDP	75,391	42.57	13,136
Anantapur	157	Hindupur	Nandamuri Balakrishna	TDP	91,704	51.47	Shaik Mohammed Iqbal	YSRCP	74,676	41.91	17,028
Anantapur	158	Penukonda	Malagundla Sankaranarayana	YSRCP	96,607	51.08	B. K. Parthasarathi	TDP	81,549	43.12	15,058
Anantapur	159	Puttaparthi	Duddukunta Sreedhar Reddy	YSRCP	97,234	56.77	Palle Raghunatha Reddy	TDP	65,979	38.52	31,255
Anantapur	160	Dharmavaram	Kethireddy Venkatarami Reddy	YSRCP	106,024	50.74	Gonuguntla Suryanarayana	TDP	90,738	43.31	15,286
Anantapur	161	Kadiri	P. V. Sidda Reddy	YSRCP	102,432	53.92	Kandikunta Venkata Prasad	TDP	75,189	39.58	27,243
Chittoor	162	Thamballapalle	Peddireddy Dwarakanatha Reddy	YSRCP	105,444	59.48	G. Shankar	TDP	58,506	33.00	46,938
Chittoor	163	Pileru	C. Ramachandra Reddy	YSRCP	87,300	48.92	Nallari Kishore Kumar Reddy	TDP	79,426	44.51	7,874
Chittoor	164	Madanapalle	M. Nawaz Basha	YSRCP	92,066	51.20	Dommalapati Ramesh	TDP	62,418	34.71	29,648
Chittoor	165	Punganur	Peddireddy Ramachandra Reddy	YSRCP	107,431	54.85	N. Anesha Reddy	TDP	63,876	32.61	43,555
Chittoor	166	Chandragiri	Chevireddy Bhaskar Reddy	YSRCP	127,790	56.00	Pulivarthi Nani	TDP	86,035	37.70	41,755
Chittoor	167	Tirupati	Bhumana Karunakar Reddy	YSRCP	80,544	44.64	M. Suguna	TDP	79,836	44.25	708
Chittoor	168	Srikalahasti	Biyyapu Madhusudhan Reddy	YSRCP	109,541	55.89	Bojjala Sudhir Reddy	TDP	71,400	36.43	38,141
Chittoor	169	Sathyavedu (SC)	Koneti Adimulam	YSRCP	103,941	59.02	Jadda Rajasekhar	TDP	59,197	33.61	44,744
Chittoor	170	Nagari	R. K. Roja	YSRCP	80,333	47.60	Gali Bhanu Prakash	TDP	77,625	46.00	2,708
Chittoor	171	Gangadhara Nellore (SC)	K. Narayana Swamy	YSRCP	103,038	59.67	Anaganti Harikrishna	TDP	57,444	33.27	45,594
Chittoor	172	Chittoor	Arani Srinivasulu	YSRCP	91,206	60.18	A. S. Manohar	TDP	51,238	33.81	39,968
Chittoor	173	Puthalapattu (SC)	M. S. Babu	YSRCP	103,265	55.25	Lalitha Kumari	TDP	74,102	39.64	29,163
Chittoor	174	Palamaner	N. Venkate Gowda	YSRCP	119,241	54.46	N. Amarnath Reddy	TDP	87,625	40.02	31,616
Chittoor	175	Kuppam	N. Chandrababu Naidu	TDP	100,146	55.18	K. Chandramouli	YSRCP	69,424	38.25	30,722

== Bypolls ==
District	Constituency		Winner				Runner Up				Margin
District	No.	Name	Candidate	Party	Votes	%	Candidate	Party	Votes	%	Margin
Kadapa	124	Badvel (SC)	Dasari Sudha	YSRCP	112,211	76.25	Panathala Suresh	BJP	21,678	14.73	90,533
Kadapa	124	Badvel (SC)	Bypoll held on 28 March 2021 following the death of the incumbent member Gunthoti Venkata Subbaiah from YSR Congress Party on 30 October 2021.								
Nellore	115	Atmakur	Mekapati Vikram Reddy	YSRCP	102,241	74.47	Gundlapalli Bharath Kumar	BJP	19,353	14.10	82,888
Nellore	115	Atmakur	Bypoll held on 23 June 2022 following the death of the incumbent member Mekapati Goutham Reddy from YSR Congress Party on 21 February 2022.								

== See also ==
- Elections in Andhra Pradesh
- List of constituencies of the Andhra Pradesh Legislative Assembly
