= T. J. R. Sudhakar Babu =

Indian politician

Thalathoti Jaya Ratna Sudhakar Babu (born 1975) is an Indian politician from Andhra Pradesh. He is a former MLA of YSR Congress Party from Santhanuthalapadu Assembly Constituency which is reserved for SC community in Prakasam district. He won the 2019 Andhra Pradesh Legislative Assembly Election.

== Early life and education ==
He hails from Tubadu Village, Nandendla Mandal, Guntur District. He was born in 1975 and his father Thalathoti Charles is a farmer.

== Career ==
Babu started his political journey with Indian National Congress in 2012. In 2017, he joined YSR Congress Party. He won the 2019 Andhra Pradesh Legislative Assembly Election on YSR Congress Party. He was denied a ticket from Santhanuthalapadu for the 2024 election. Merugu Nagarjuna is nominated to contest on YSRCP ticket for the 2024 Election but he lost against TDP candidate B. N. Vijaya Kumar.
