= Tatiparthi Chandrasekhar =

Indian politician

Member of Andhra Pradesh Legislative Assembly
- Incumbent
- Assumed office 12 June 2024
- Preceded by: Audimulapu Suresh
- Constituency: Yerragondapalem

Personal details
- Party: YSR Congress Party
- Education: Muffakham Jah College of Engineering and Technology
- Profession: Politician

Tatiparthi Chandrasekhar (born 1980) is an Indian politician from Andhra Pradesh. He is a member of the Andhra Pradesh Legislative Assembly from Yerragondapalem Assembly constituency which is reserved for the SC community in Prakasam district. He represents YSR Congress Party. He won the 2024 Andhra Pradesh Legislative Assembly election despite a wave in favour of Telugu Desam Party and its allies Bharatiya Janata Party and Jana Sena Party.

== Early life and education ==
Chandrasekhar is from a farmer's family in Yerragondapalem village. But he has taken up contractual work and is now a businessman. His father's name is Hussain. He married Bhagya. He completed his bachelor's degree in civil engineering in 2000 at Muffakham Jah College of Engineering and Technology, Banjara Hills, Hyderabad.

== Career ==
Chandrasekhar won the 2024 Andhra Pradesh Legislative Assembly election despite a wave against the YSR Congress Party. He was nominated in place of sitting MLA Adimulapu Suresh by YSR Congress Party. As early as January 2024, he was nominated as the coordinator of Yerragondapalem Assembly constituency, considered a stronghold of the YSR Congress Party. He polled 91,741 votes and defeated Guduri Erixion Babu of Telugu Desam Party by a margin of 5,200 votes. He is one among the 11 YSRCP MLAs who won the 2024 election. Chandrasekhar's brother Sudhakar and his wife and Singarayakonda sarpanch, Vanaja, campaigned for YSR Congress Party candidate Chandrasekhar. His wife, Bhagya, also campaigned for him in many villages. He urged people to vote for Jagan Mohan Reddy, who implemented 99 per cent of the promises, and to the YSRCP MP candidate, Chevireddy Bhaskar Reddy.
