= Audimulapu Suresh =

Indian politician

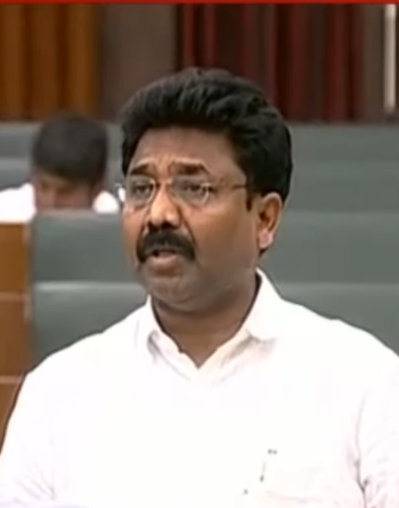

Minister of Municipal Administration & Urban Development Government of Andhra Pradesh
- In office 11 April 2022 – 4 June 2024
- Governor: Biswabhusan Harichandan (2022-2023); S. Abdul Nazeer (2023-present)
- Chief Minister: Y. S. Jagan Mohan Reddy
- Preceded by: Botsa Satyanarayana
- Succeeded by: Ponguru Narayana

Minister of Education Government of Andhra Pradesh
- In office 8 June 2019 – 7 April 2022
- Governor: E. S. L. Narasimhan (2019); Biswabhusan Harichandan (2019-2022)
- Chief Minister: Y. S. Jaganmohan Reddy
- Preceded by: Ganta Srinivasa Rao
- Succeeded by: Botsa Satyanarayana

Member of Legislative Assembly Andhra Pradesh
- In office 23 May 2019 – 04 June 2024
- Preceded by: David Raju Palaparthi
- Succeeded by: Tatiparthi Chandrasekhar
- Constituency: Yerragondapalem
- In office 2014–2019
- Preceded by: B N Vijay Kumar
- Succeeded by: T. J. R. Sudhakar Babu
- Constituency: Santhanuthalapadu
- In office 2009–2014
- Preceded by: Constituency Established
- Succeeded by: David Raju Palaparthi
- Constituency: Yerragondapalem

Personal details
- Born: 27 April 1964 (age 62) Markapuram, Prakasam district, Andhra
- Party: YSR Congress Party
- Other political affiliations: Indian National Congress
- Spouse: T. H. Vijaya Lakshmi
- Children: 2
- Parents: Aadimulapu Samuel George (father); Cherukuri Theresamma (mother)
- Education: National Institute of Technology Karnataka (NITK Surathkal)
- Occupation: Politician

Audimulapu Suresh (born 27 April 1964) is a former Indian civil servant turned politician, and a member of fourteenth Andhra Pradesh Legislative Assembly. He represented Yerragondapalem Constituency in Andhra Pradesh and is a member of YSR Congress Party.

He was the Education minister of Andhra Pradesh from 2019 to 2022 and incumbent as Minister of Municipal Administration & Urban Development, Andhra Pradesh under Chief Minister Y. S. Jagan Mohan Reddy.

== Early life ==
Suresh was born to Audimulapu Samuel George, founder of George Group of Institutions at Markapur in Prakasam District. Suresh did his Bachelor's degree in Civil Engineering from National Institute of Technology Karnataka in 1984 and later completed a doctorate in Computer Science Engineering. He married T. H. Vijaya Lakshmi. Previously, he worked as Deputy Financial Officer and Chief Accounts Officer in Indian Railways.

== Political career ==
Suresh started his political career in the year 2009 by quitting his designation as a Civil Servant from Indian Railways. He was nominated by Congress Party to contest the Yerragondapalem Constituency and became an MLA for the first time winning the 2009 Andhra Pradesh Legislative Assembly Election. In the next election he became a Member of Legislative Assembly for the second time on YSR Congress Party ticket from Santhanuthalapadu Constituency. In 2019, he shifted back to Yerragondapoalem and won the 2019 Andhra Pradesh Legislative Assembly Election defeating Budala Ajitha Rao of Telugu Desam Party by a margin of 31,632 votes. However, in the 2024 Andhra Pradesh Legislative Assembly Election, he contested from Kondapi Constituency and lost to his opponent by a margin of 24,756 votes.

Year	Constituency	Political Party	Result
2009	Yerragondapalem	Indian National Congress	Won
2014	Santhanuthalapadu	YSR Congress Party	Won
2019	Yerragondapalem	YSR Congress Party	Won
2024	Kondapi	YSR Congress Party	Lost

== See also ==
- Yerragondapalem
- Santhanuthalapadu
