= Y. Balanagi Reddy =

Indian politician

Member of Legislative Assembly Andhra Pradesh
- Incumbent
- Assumed office 2009
- Preceded by: Constituency Established
- Constituency: Mantralayam

Personal details
- Party: YSRCP
- Occupation: Politician

Yellareddy Gari Balanagi Reddy (born 1971) is an Indian politician from Andhra Pradesh. He is a four-time MLA from Mantralayam Assembly constituency in Kurnool district. He won the 2019 Andhra Pradesh Legislative Assembly election representing the YSR Congress Party. He has been nominated again by the YSR Congress Party to contest the Mantralayam Assembly seat in the 2024 Assembly election and he won the 2024 election.

== Early life and education ==
Reddy was born in Rampuram village, Kurnool district. His late father Bheem Reddy was a farmer. He completed his schooling from National Institute of Open Schooling.

== Career ==
Reddy began his political career with the Telugu Desam Party in 2009. He won the 2009 Andhra Pradesh Legislative Assembly election from Mantralayam representing the Telugu Desam Party. He defeated Dalavai Ramaiah of the Indian National Congress by a margin of 10,697 votes. Later, he shifted to the YSR Congress Party and retained the 2014 Mantralayam seat defeating his closest rival Palakurthi Thikka Reddy of the Telugu Desam Party by a margin of 7,462 votes.

He became an MLA for the third time winning the 2019 Andhra Pradesh Legislative Assembly election from Mantralayam on the YSR Congress Party ticket defeating Palakurthi Thikka Reddy, again by a wider margin of 23,879 votes.
