= David Raju Palaparthi =

Indian politician (1958–2024)

Shri. Palaparthi David Raju Honourable MLA

Member of Andhra Pradesh Legislative Assembly
- In office 2014.–2019
- Preceded by: Audimulapu Suresh
- Succeeded by: Audimulapu Suresh
- Constituency: Yerragondapalem
- In office 1999–2004
- Preceded by: Thavanam Chenchaiah
- Succeeded by: Dara Sambaiah
- Constituency: Santhanuthalapadu

Chairman of Prakasam Zilla Praja Parishad
- In office 1995–1999
- Succeeded by: Mukku Kasi Reddy
- Constituency: Yerragondapalem

Personal details
- Born: 7 May 1958 Mattigunta village, Naguluppalapadu, Prakasam district, Andhra Pradesh, India
- Died: 25 August 2024 (aged 66) Hyderabad, Telangana, India
- Citizenship: Indian
- Party: Telugu Desam Party
- Parent: George
- Occupation: Politician

Palaparthi David Raju (7 May 1958 – 25 August 2024) was an Indian politician who was an elected member of Andhra Pradesh Legislative Assembly, representing Yerragondapalem constituency. Previously, he was elected as member from Santhanuthalapadu constituency.

== Early life ==
Palaparthi was born in Mattigunta Village of Naguluppala Padu Mandal of Prakasam district on 7 May 1958. He graduated with a Master of Arts and L.L.B. from Andhra University.

== Political career ==
His political career was started in the year 1987 as party member in Telugu Desam Party. Later, he rose to Member of Mandal Praja Parishad. After that, he was elected as Chairman to Zilla Praja Parishad. In 1999, for the first time; he was elected as Member of Andhra Pradesh Legislative Assembly from Santhanuthalapadu constituency from Telugu Desam Party. Later, he joined YSR Congress Party in 2010. In 2014, he was elected as Member of Andhra Pradesh Legislative Assembly from Yerragondapalem constituency from YSR Congress Party. He shifted to Telugu Desam Party in 2016.

Elections in Political Career
Year	Constituency	Party	Result
1999	Santhanuthalapadu	TDP	Won
2009	Yerragondapalem	TDP	Loss
2014	Yerragondapalem	YSRCP	Won

== Death ==
Palaparthi died from kidney disease on 25 August 2024, at the age of 66.
