= Yerragondapalem Assembly constituency =

Constituency of the Andhra Pradesh Legislative Assembly, India

Coordinates: 16.04°N 79.30°E

Yerragondapalem
- Constituency No. 102 for the Andhra Pradesh Legislative Assembly
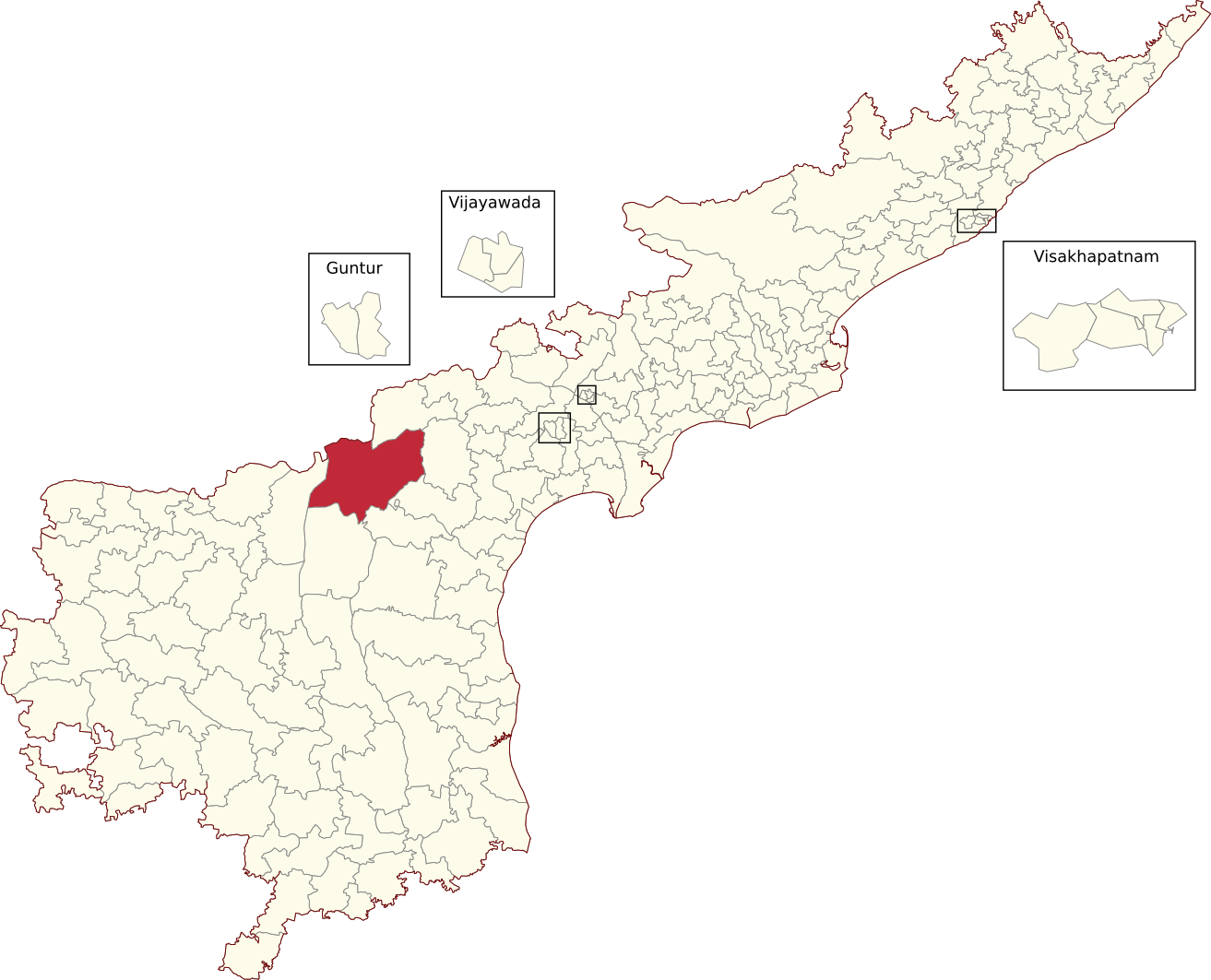
- Location of Yerragondapalem Assembly constituency within Andhra Pradesh

Constituency details
- Country: India
- Region: South India
- State: Andhra Pradesh
- District: Markapuram
- Lok Sabha constituency: Ongole
- Established: 2008
- Total electors: 200,379
- Reservation: SC

Member of Legislative Assembly
- 16th Andhra Pradesh Legislative Assembly
- Incumbent Tatiparthi Chandrasekhar
- Party: YSRCP
- Elected year: 2024

Yerragondapalem Assembly constituency is a Scheduled Caste reserved constituency in Markapuram district of Andhra Pradesh that elects representatives to the Andhra Pradesh Legislative Assembly in India. It is one of the seven assembly segments of Ongole Lok Sabha constituency.

Tatiparthi Chandrasekhar is the current MLA of the constituency, having won 2024 Andhra Pradesh Legislative Assembly election from YSR Congress Party. As of 2019, there are a total of 200,379 electors in the constituency. The constituency was established in 2008, as per the Delimitation Orders (2008).

== Mandals ==
Mandal
Yerragondapalem
Pullalacheruvu
Tripuranthakam
Dornala
Peda Araveedu

== Members of the Legislative Assembly ==
Year	Member	Political party
1955	Nakka Venkatayya	Indian National Congress
1960 by-election	J. Rami Reddy	Indian National Congress
1962	Poola Subbaiah	Communist Party of India
1967	Poola Subbaiah	Communist Party of India
1972	Kandula Obul Reddy	Indian National Congress
2009	Audimulapu Suresh	Indian National Congress
2014	David Raju Palaparthi	YSR Congress Party
2019	Audimulapu Suresh	YSR Congress Party
2024	Tatiparthi Chandrasekhar	YSR Congress Party

== Election results ==
=== 2024 ===
2024 Andhra Pradesh Legislative Assembly election: Yerragondapalem
Party	Candidate	Votes	%	±%
YSRCP	Tatiparthi Chandrasekhar	91,741	49.4	
TDP	Guduri Erixion Babu	86,541	46.6	
INC	Ajitha Rao Budhala	2,192	1.18	
NOTA	None Of The Above	2,231	1.2	
Majority		5,200	2.79	
Turnout		1,85,725		
YSRCP hold		Swing		

=== 2019 ===
2019 Andhra Pradesh Legislative Assembly election: Yerragondapalem
Party	Candidate	Votes	%	±%
YSRCP	Audimulapu Suresh	99,408	56.34	
TDP	Ajitha Rao Budala	67,776	38.41	
JSP	Gowtham Raj Pakanati	2,942	1.67	
NOTA	None of the Above	2,997	1.7	
Majority		31,632	17.93	
Turnout		1,73,123		
YSRCP hold		Swing		

=== 2014 ===
2014 Andhra Pradesh Legislative Assembly election: Yerragondapalem
Party	Candidate	Votes	%	±%
YSRCP	David Raju Palaparthi	85,774	54.33	
TDP	Ajitha Rao Budala	66,703	42.25	
Majority		19,071	12.08	
Turnout		157,884	83.76	+9.70
YSRCP gain from INC		Swing		

=== 2009 ===
2009 Andhra Pradesh Legislative Assembly election: Yerragondapalem
Party	Candidate	Votes	%	±%
INC	Audimulapu Suresh	67,040	50.08	
TDP	David Raju Palaparthi	53,846	40.22	
PRP	Nandigam Jesi Babu	6,120	4.57	
Majority		13,194	9.76	
Turnout		133,874	74.06	
INC win (new seat)				

=== 1972 ===
1972 Andhra Pradesh Legislative Assembly election: Yerragondapalem
Party	Candidate	Votes	%	±%
INC	Kandula Obula Reddy	23,166	51.28%	
CPI	Poola Subbaiah	19,072	42.22%	
Margin of victory		4,094	9.06%	
Turnout		46,557	55.72%	
Registered electors		83,553		
INC gain from CPI		Swing		

=== 1967 ===
1967 Andhra Pradesh Legislative Assembly election: Yerragondapalem
Party	Candidate	Votes	%	±%
CPI	Poola Subbaiah	26,451	60.97%	
Independent	Y Ramaiah	13,780	31.76%	
Margin of victory		12,671	29.21%	
Turnout		45,421	62.35%	
Registered electors		72,848		
CPI hold		Swing		

=== 1962 ===
1962 Andhra Pradesh Legislative Assembly election: Yerragondapalem
Party	Candidate	Votes	%	±%
CPI	Poola Subbaiah	25,304	59.41%	
INC	Janke Rami Reddy	14,913	35.02%	
Margin of victory		10,391	24.40%	
Turnout		44,524	67.35%	
Registered electors		66,112		
CPI gain from INC		Swing		

=== 1955 ===
1955 Andhra State Legislative Assembly election: Yerragondapalem
Party	Candidate	Votes	%	±%
INC	Nakka Venkatayya	12,323	41.37%	
CPI	Ravulapalli Chenchaiah	9,755	32.75%	
Margin of victory		2,568	8.62%	
Turnout		29,790	53.11%	
Registered electors		56,096		
INC win (new seat)				

== See also ==
- List of constituencies of Andhra Pradesh Legislative Assembly
