= Mantralayam Assembly constituency =

Constituency of the Andhra Pradesh Legislative Assembly, India

Coordinates: 15.94°N 77.42°E

Mantralayam
- Constituency No. 145 for the Andhra Pradesh Legislative Assembly
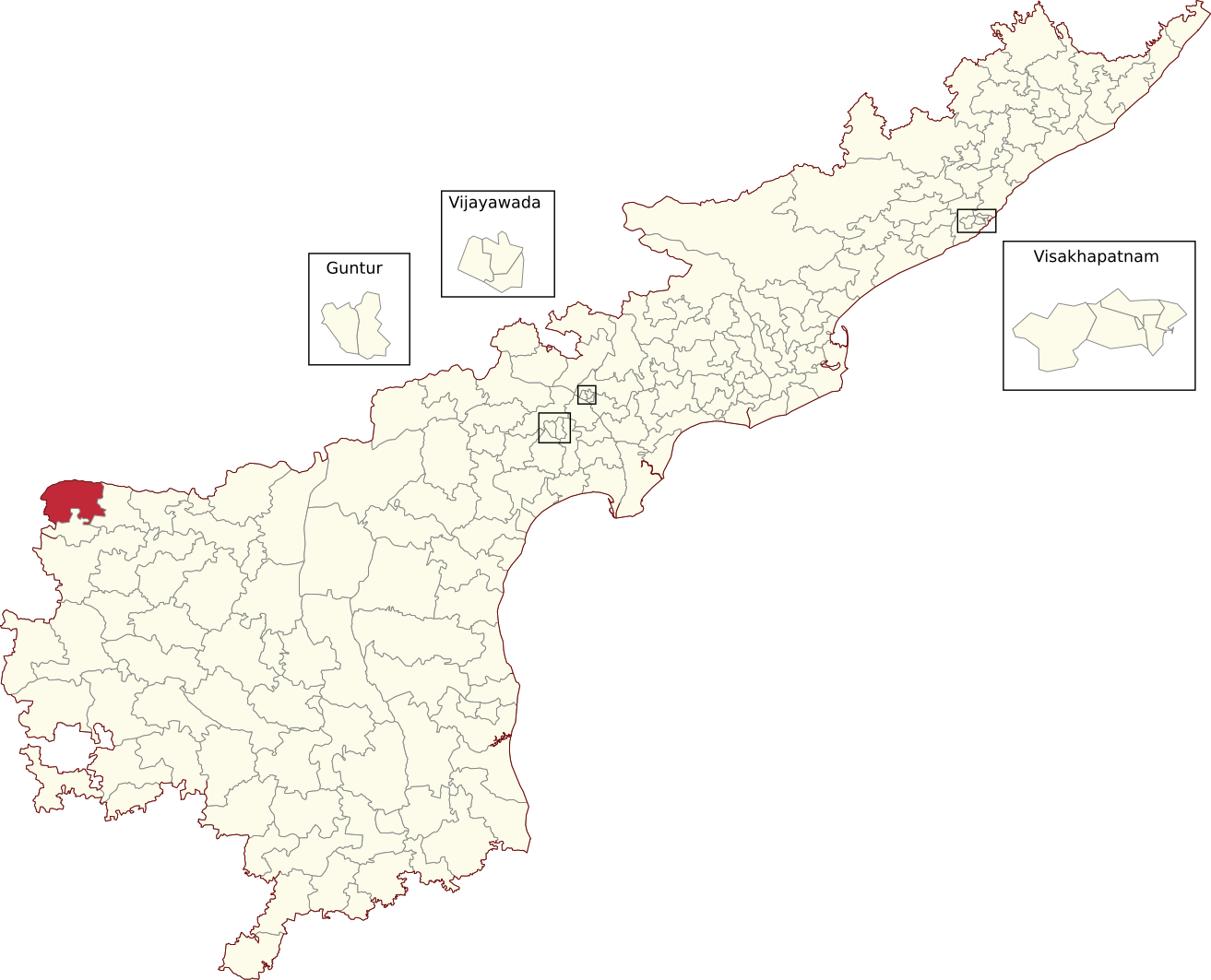
- Location of Mantralayam Assembly constituency within Andhra Pradesh

Constituency details
- Country: India
- Region: South India
- State: Andhra Pradesh
- District: Kurnool
- Lok Sabha constituency: Kurnool
- Established: 2008
- Total electors: 187,011
- Reservation: None

Member of Legislative Assembly
- 16th Andhra Pradesh Legislative Assembly
- Incumbent Y. Balanagi Reddy
- Party: YSR Congress Party
- Elected year: 2024

Mantralayam Assembly constituency is a constituency in Kurnool district of Andhra Pradesh that elects representatives to the Andhra Pradesh Legislative Assembly in India. It is one of the seven assembly segments of Kurnool Lok Sabha constituency.

Y. Balanagi Reddy is the current MLA of the constituency, having won the 2024 Andhra Pradesh Legislative Assembly election from YSR Congress Party. As of 2019, there are a total of 187,011 electors in the constituency. The constituency was established in 2008, as per the Delimitation Orders (2008).

== Mandals ==
Mandal
Peda Kadubur
Mantralayam
Kosigi
Kowthalam

== Members of the Legislative Assembly ==
Year	Member	Political party
2009	Y. Balanagi Reddy	Telugu Desam Party
2014	Y. Balanagi Reddy	YSR Congress Party
2019	Y. Balanagi Reddy	YSR Congress Party
2024	Y. Balanagi Reddy	YSR Congress Party

== Election results ==
=== 2009 ===
2009 Andhra Pradesh Legislative Assembly election: Mantralayam
Party	Candidate	Votes	%	±%
TDP	Y. Balanagi Reddy	52,431	46.83	
INC	Dalavai Ramaiah	41,734	37.28	
PRP	N. Rama Reddy	10,176	9.09	
Majority		10,697	9.55	
Turnout		111,957	69.96	
TDP win (new seat)				

=== 2014 ===
2014 Andhra Pradesh Legislative Assembly election: Mantralayam
Party	Candidate	Votes	%	±%
YSRCP	Y. Balanagi Reddy	69,858	49.73	
TDP	P. Thikka Reddy	62,396	44.42	
Majority		7,462	5.31	
Turnout		140,478	78.18	+8.22
YSRCP gain from TDP		Swing		

=== 2019 ===
2019 Andhra Pradesh Legislative Assembly election: Mantralayam
Party	Candidate	Votes	%	±%
YSRCP	Y. Balanagi Reddy	86,896	54.53%	
TDP	P. Thikka Reddy	63017	39.55%	
Majority		23,879	14.98	
Turnout		159345	85.19%	
YSRCP gain from TDP		Swing		

=== 2024 ===
2024 Andhra Pradesh Legislative Assembly election: Mantralayam
Party	Candidate	Votes	%	±%
YSRCP	Y. Balanagi Reddy	87,662	49.29	
TDP	Nallagowni Raghavendra Reddy	74,857	42.45	
INC	P. S. Murli Krishnaraju Dora	4,660	2.64	
NOTA	None Of The Above	3,674	2.08	
Majority		12,805	6.84	
Turnout		1,76,324		
YSRCP hold		Swing		

== See also ==
- List of villages of mandals of Mantralayam
- List of constituencies of Andhra Pradesh Legislative Assembly
