= V. Jogeswara Rao =

Indian politician

Member of Legislative Assembly, Andhra Pradesh
- Incumbent
- Assumed office 2 June 2014
- Preceded by: Andhra Pradesh Assembly created
- Constituency: Mandapeta

Member of Legislative Assembly, United Andhra Pradesh
- In office 16 May 2009 – 1 June 2014
- Preceded by: Constituency established
- Succeeded by: United Andhra Pradesh Assembly divided
- Constituency: Mandapeta

Personal details
- Born: 1961 (age 64–65)
- Party: Telugu Desam Party

Vegulla Jogeswara Rao is a politician from the Indian state of Andhra Pradesh. He won thrice consecutively as the Member of the Legislative Assembly from Mandapeta Assembly constituency.

== Early and personal life ==
Rao was born in 1961 in Mandapeta village, East Godavari district of Andhra Pradesh. He completed B.Com. from Andhra University.

== Political career ==
Rao entered politics through the Telugu Desam Party and first contested the Mandapeta Municipality elections and worked as the Municipal Chairman. He contested the 2004 Andhra Pradesh Legislative Assembly from Alamur constituency on behalf of TDP and lost to his closest rival Indian National Congress candidate Bikkina Krishnarjuna Chaudhary.

Rao contested from the newly formed Mandapeta constituency in 2009 Andhra Pradesh Legislative Assembly as part of the redistribution of constituencies and was elected as an MLA for the first time by defeating his nearest rival Praja Rajyam Party candidate V. V. S. S. Chowdhary. He defeated YCP candidate Girajala Venkataswamy Naidu in 2014 Andhra Pradesh Legislative Assembly. In 2019 Andhra Pradesh Legislative Assembly he won for the third time against Pilli Subhash Chandra Bose.
