= Dwarampudi Chandrasekhar Reddy =

Indian politician

Dwarampudi Chandrasekhara Reddy

Member of Legislative Assembly Andhra Pradesh
- In office 2019–2024
- Preceded by: Vanamadi Venkateswara Rao
- Succeeded by: Vanamadi Venkateswara Rao
- Constituency: Kakinada City
- In office 2009–2014
- Preceded by: Constituency Established
- Succeeded by: Vanamadi Venkateswara Rao
- Constituency: Kakinada City

Personal details
- Born: 8 July 1967 (age 58) Venkat Nagar, East Godavari district (now Kakinada district), Andhra Pradesh, India
- Party: YSR Congress Party (2014-present)
- Other political affiliations: Indian National Congress (2009-2014)
- Spouse: Smt D. Mahalakshmi
- Children: 2
- Parent: D.Bhaskara Reddy (Father)
- Occupation: Politician

Dwarampudi Chandrasekhara Reddy (born 1967) is an Indian politician from Andhra Pradesh. He was a former member of the Andhra Pradesh Legislative Assembly. He was elected from Kakinada City representing the YSR Congress Party.

== Early life ==
Reddy is from Kakinada, Andhra Pradesh. He married D Mahalakshmi and together they have two children. He is the son of D Bhaskara Reddy. He studied intermediate (Class 12) at Ideal College of Arts and Science, Kakinada, and passed the examinations in 1984.

== Career ==
Reddy served as an MLA for two terms after he was elected in 2009 and 2019. In between, he lost the 2014 and 2024 Assembly elections.

Reddy was first elected as an MLA from Kakinada City Assembly constituency representing the Indian National Congress in the 2009 Andhra Pradesh Legislative Assembly election. In 2009, he polled 44,606 votes and defeated his closest opponent, Bandana Hari of the Prajarajyam Party, by a margin of 9,279 votes.

He was a close associate of Jagan Mohan Reddy and shifted to YSR Congress Party during the bifurcation and contested the 2014 election as a YSR Congress Party candidate. In the 2014 Andhra Pradesh Legislative Assembly election, he contested from the same seat and got 52,467 votes but lost to winner, Vanamadi Venkateswara Rao of the Telugu Desam Party, by a margin of 24,000 votes.

He regained the seat in the 2019 Andhra Pradesh Legislative Assembly election for the YSR Congress Party. He polled 73,890 votes and defeated his nearest rival, Vanamadi Venkateswara Rao of the TDP, by a margin of 14,111 votes. However, in 2024, he lost by a margin of 56,000 votes to Vanamadi Venkateswara Rao.

=== Controversy ===
In December 2024, his name was involved in a Public Distribution System (PDS) rice smuggling controversy at the Kakinada Port.
