= Vamsi Krishna Srinivas =

Indian politician

Member of the Andhra Pradesh Legislative Assembly
- Incumbent
- Assumed office 2024
- Preceded by: Vasupalli Ganesh Kumar
- Constituency: Visakhapatnam South

Personal details
- Party: Janasena Party

Chennuboina Vamsi Krishna Srinivas Yadav is an Indian politician from Andhra Pradesh. He is a member of Janasena Party. He has been elected as the Member of the Legislative Assembly representing the Visakhapatnam South Assembly constituency in 2024 Andhra Pradesh Legislative Assembly elections.
