= Visakhapatnam South Assembly constituency =

Constituency of the Andhra Pradesh Legislative Assembly, India

Coordinates: 17.68°N 83.28°E

Visakhapatnam South
- Constituency No. 22 for the Andhra Pradesh Legislative Assembly
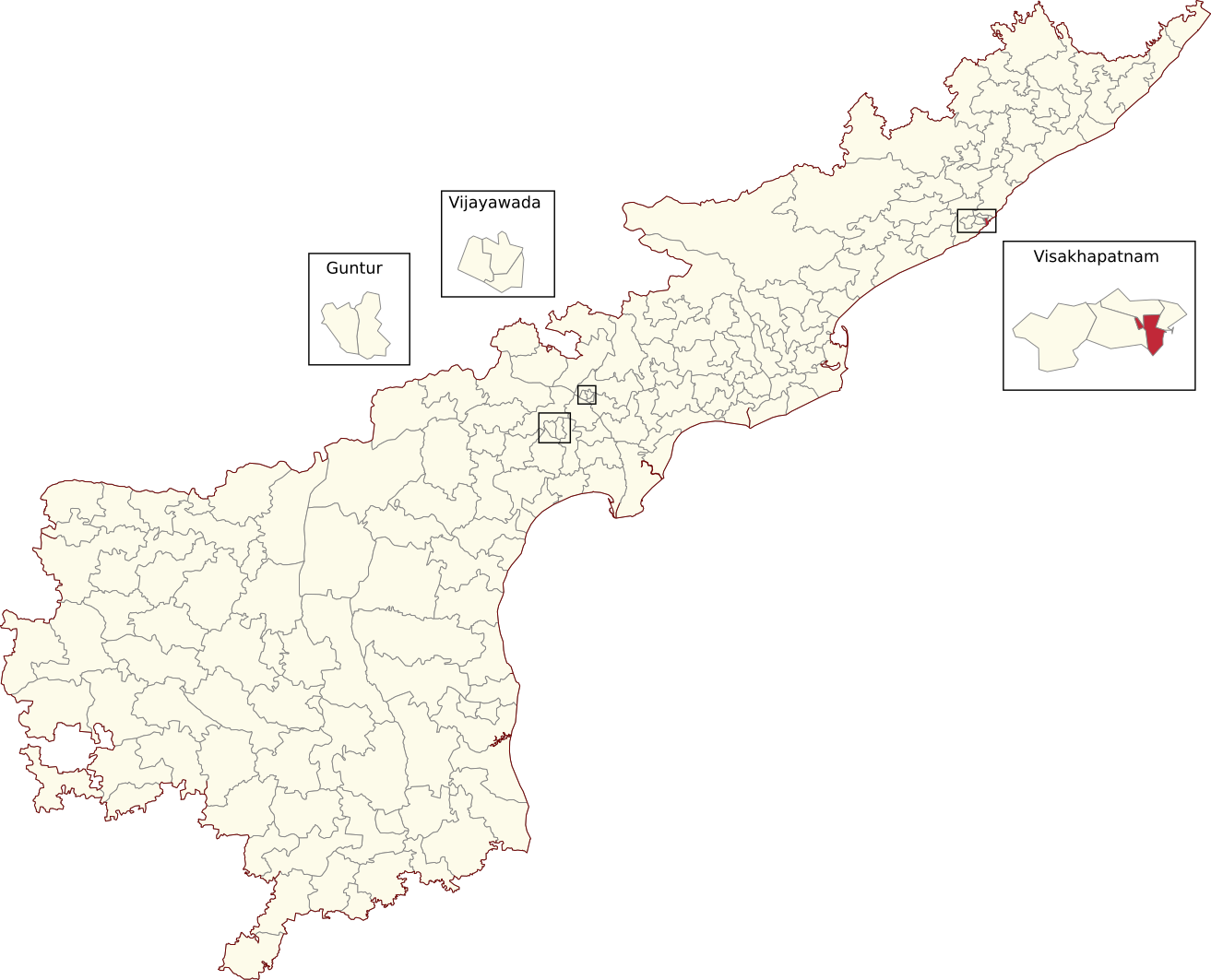
- Location of Visakhapatnam South Assembly constituency within Andhra Pradesh

Constituency details
- Country: India
- Region: South India
- State: Andhra Pradesh
- District: Visakhapatnam
- Lok Sabha constituency: Visakhapatnam
- Established: 2008
- Total electors: 209,186
- Reservation: None

Member of Legislative Assembly
- 16th Andhra Pradesh Legislative Assembly
- Incumbent Vamsi Krishna Srinivas
- Party: JSP

Visakhapatnam South Assembly constituency is a constituency in Visakhapatnam district of Andhra Pradesh that elects representatives to the Andhra Pradesh Legislative Assembly in India. It is one of the seven assembly segments of the Visakhapatnam Lok Sabha constituency.

Vamsi Krishna Srinivas is the current MLA of the constituency, having won the 2024 Andhra Pradesh Legislative Assembly election from Janasena Party. As of 2019, there were a total of 209,186 electors in the constituency. The constituency was established in 2008, as per the Delimitation Orders (2008).

== Mandals ==
The mandal and wards that form the assembly constituency are:

Mandal
Visakhapatnam (Urban) Mandal (Part) Visakhapatnam (M.Corp) Ward No. 12 to 34, 42 to 43 and 46 to 48

== Members of the Legislative Assembly ==
| Year | Member | Political party |
|---|---|---|
| 2009 | Dronamraju Srinvasa Rao | Indian National Congress |
| 2014 | Vasupalli Ganesh Kumar | Telugu Desam Party |
| 2019 | Vasupalli Ganesh Kumar | Telugu Desam Party |
| 2024 | Vamsi Krishna Srinivas | Janasena Party |

== Election results ==
=== 2009 ===
2009 Andhra Pradesh Legislative Assembly election: Visakhapatnam South
| Party | Candidate | Votes | % | ±% |
|---|---|---|---|---|
| INC | Dronamraju Srinivasa Rao | 45,971 | 35.66 | |
| PRP | Kola Guruvulu | 45,630 | 35.40 | |
| TDP | Vasupalli Ganesh Kumar | 24,208 | 18.78 | |
| BJP | Challa Mahalakshmi | 2,128 | 1.65 | |
| Majority | | 341 | 0.26 | |
| Turnout | | 128,907 | 73.84 | |
| INC win (new seat) | | | | |

=== 2014 ===
2014 Andhra Pradesh Legislative Assembly election: Visakhapatnam South
| Party | Candidate | Votes | % | ±% |
|---|---|---|---|---|
| TDP | Vasupalli Ganesh Kumar | 66,686 | 51.45 | |
| YSRCP | Kola Guruvulu | 48,370 | 37.32 | |
| Majority | | 18,316 | 14.13 | |
| Turnout | | 129,613 | 65.65 | −8.19 |
| TDP gain from INC | | Swing | | |

=== 2019 ===
2019 Andhra Pradesh Legislative Assembly election: Visakhapatnam South
| Party | Candidate | Votes | % | ±% |
|---|---|---|---|---|
| TDP | Vasupalli Ganesh Kumar | 52,172 | 41.50 | |
| YSRCP | Dronamraju Srinivasa Rao | 48,443 | 38.54 | |
| JSP | Gampala Giridhar | 18,119 | 14.41 | |
| Majority | | 3,729 | 2.96 | |
| Turnout | | | | |
| TDP hold | | Swing | | |

=== 2024 ===
2024 Andhra Pradesh Legislative Assembly election: Visakhapatnam South
| Party | | Votes | % | ±% |
|---|---|---|---|---|
| JSP | Vamsi Krishna Srinivas | 97,868 | 70.23 | |
| YSRCP | Vasupalli Ganesh Kumar | 33,274 | 23.87 | |
| NOTA | None Of The Above | 631 | 0.45 | |
| Majority | | 64,594 | 46.36 | |
| Turnout | | 139339 | 64.27 | |
| JSP gain from YSRCP | | Swing | | |

== See also ==
- List of constituencies of the Andhra Pradesh Legislative Assembly
