= Vasupalli Ganesh Kumar =

Indian politician

Vasupalli Ganesh Kumar (born 1965) is an Indian politician from Andhra Pradesh. He won the 2019 Andhra Pradesh Legislative Assembly election on Telugu Desam Party ticket from Visakhapatnam South constituency in Visakhapatnam district but lost the 2024 election.

== Early life and education ==
Kumar was born in Marripalem, Visakhapatnam to late Ramana. He is a graduate.

== Career ==
He was elected to the Andhra Pradesh Legislative Assembly in 2019 from Visakhapatnam South constituency. He defeated Dronamraju Srinivasa Rao of YSR Congress Party by a margin of 3,729 votes. He later resigned from TDP and shifted to YSR Congress party and nominated to contest from the same seat representing YSRCP in the 2024 Andhra Pradesh Legislative Assembly election. But he lost to Vamsi Krishna Srinivasa Yadav of Janasena Party by a margin of 64,594 votes.

== Controversy ==
In August 2023, he was convicted and sentenced to a six-month jail term and a fine of Rs.5000 on charges of attacking a person. He said he would challenge the verdict in the High Court.
