= Kakinada City Assembly constituency =

Constituency of the Andhra Pradesh Legislative Assembly, India

Coordinates: 16.99°N 82.25°E

Kakinada City
- Constituency No. 41 for the Andhra Pradesh Legislative Assembly
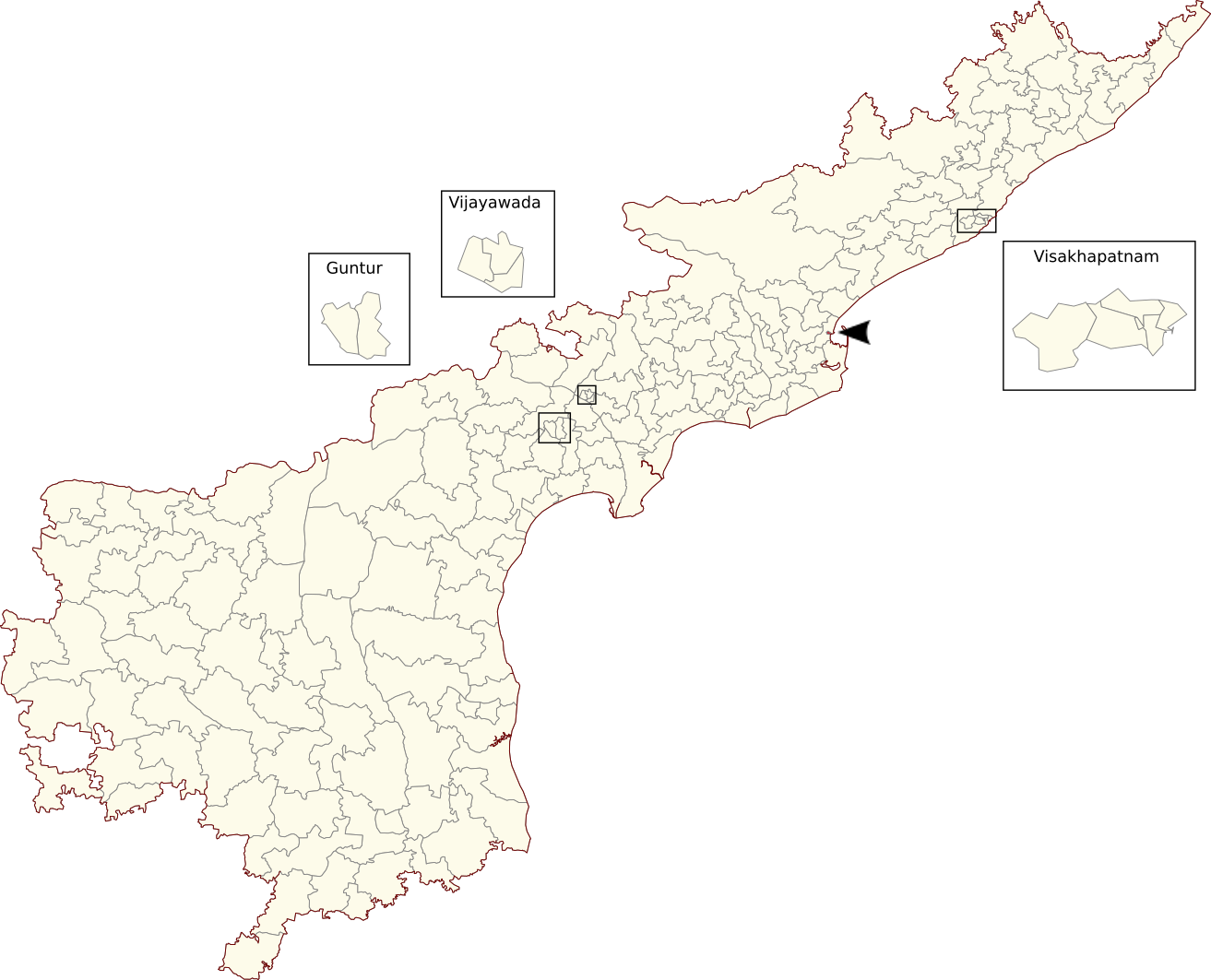
- Location of Kakinada City Assembly constituency (shown with arrow) within Andhra Pradesh

Constituency details
- Country: India
- Region: South India
- State: Andhra Pradesh
- District: Kakinada
- Lok Sabha constituency: Kakinada
- Established: 2008
- Total electors: 255,716
- Reservation: None

Member of Legislative Assembly
- 16th Andhra Pradesh Legislative Assembly
- Incumbent Vanamadi Venkateswara Rao
- Party: TDP
- Alliance: NDA
- Elected year: 2024
- Preceded by: Dwarampudi Chandrasekhar Reddy

Kakinada City Assembly constituency is a constituency in Kakinada district of Andhra Pradesh, that elects representatives to the Andhra Pradesh Legislative Assembly, in India. It is one of the seven assembly segments of Kakinada Lok Sabha constituency.

Vanamadi Venkateswara Rao is the current MLA of the constituency, having won the 2024 Andhra Pradesh Legislative Assembly election from Telugu Desam Party. As of 2019, there are a total of 255,716 electors in the constituency. The constituency was established in 2008, as per the Delimitation Orders (2008).

== Mandals ==
The mandal and wards that form the assembly constituency are:

Mandal
Kakinada (urban) mandal (Part) Kakinada Urban (M) (Part) Kakinada(M) Ward No. 1 to 65

== Members of the Legislative Assembly ==
Year	Member	Political party
2009	Dwarampudi Chandrasekhar Reddy	Indian National Congress
2014	Vanamadi Venkateswara Rao (Konda Babu)	Telugu Desam Party
2019	Dwarampudi Chandrasekhar Reddy	YSR Congress Party
2024	Vanamadi Venkateswara Rao (Konda Babu)	Telugu Desam Party

== Election results ==
=== 2024 ===
2024 Andhra Pradesh Legislative Assembly election: Kakinada City
Party	Candidate	Votes	%	±%
TDP	Vanamadi Venkateswara Rao	113,014	63.7	
YSRCP	Dwarampudi Chandrasekhar Reddy	56,442	32.9	
INC	Chekka Nookaraju	2138	1.21	
NOTA	None Of The Above	1446	0.82	
Majority		56,572	31.92	
Turnout		1,77,184		
TDP gain from YSRCP		Swing		

=== 2019 ===
2019 Andhra Pradesh Legislative Assembly election: Kakinada City
Party	Candidate	Votes	%	±%
YSRCP	Dwarampudi Chandrasekhar Reddy	73,890	43.06%	
TDP	Vanamadi Venkateswara Rao	59,779	34.84%	
JSP	Mutha Sasidhar	30,188	17.59%	
INC	Kola Vara Prasad Varma	3262	2	N/A
NOTA	None of the above	1654	1	N/A
BJP	Peddireddi Ravi Kiran	1581	0.92	
Majority		14,111	8.22%	
Turnout		171,604		
YSRCP gain from TDP		Swing	5.72%	

=== 2014 ===
2014 Andhra Pradesh Legislative Assembly election: Kakinada City
Party	Candidate	Votes	%	±%
TDP	Vanamadi Venkateswara Rao	76,467	54.42	
YSRCP	Dwarampudi Chandrasekhar Reddy	52,467	37.34	
Majority		24,000	17.08	
Turnout		140,523	67.87	−4.67
TDP gain from INC		Swing		

=== 2009 ===
2009 Andhra Pradesh Legislative Assembly election: Kakinada City
Party	Candidate	Votes	%	±%
INC	Dwarampudi Chandrasekhar Reddy	44,606	37.28	
PRP	Bandana Hari	35,327	29.52	
TDP	Vanamadi Venkateswara Rao	25,636	21.42	
Majority		9,279	7.76	
Turnout		119,664	72.54	
INC win (new seat)				

== See also ==
- List of constituencies of the Andhra Pradesh Legislative Assembly
