= Santhanuthalapadu Assembly constituency =

Constituency of the Andhra Pradesh Legislative Assembly, India

Coordinates: 15.54°N 79.94°E

Santhanuthalapadu
- Constituency No. 107 for the Andhra Pradesh Legislative Assembly
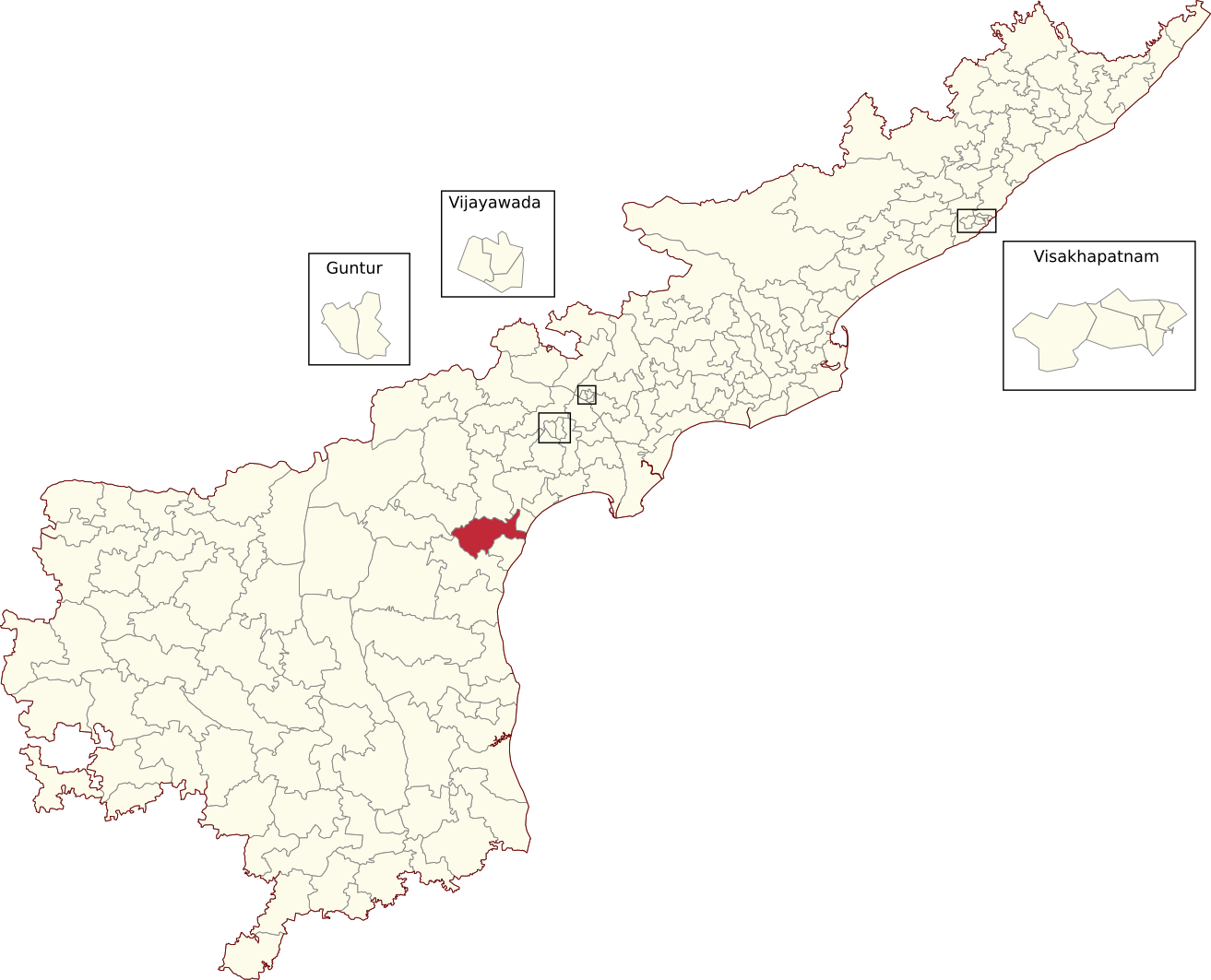
- Location of Santhanuthalapadu Assembly constituency within Andhra Pradesh

Constituency details
- Country: India
- Region: South India
- State: Andhra Pradesh
- District: Prakasam
- Lok Sabha constituency: Bapatla
- Established: 1962
- Total electors: 211,326
- Reservation: SC

Member of Legislative Assembly
- 16th Andhra Pradesh Legislative Assembly
- Incumbent B. N. Vijay Kumar
- Party: TDP
- Alliance: NDA
- Elected year: 2024

Santhanuthalapadu is a Scheduled Caste reserved constituency in Prakasam district of Andhra Pradesh that elects representatives to the Andhra Pradesh Legislative Assembly in India. It is one of the seven assembly segments of Bapatla Lok Sabha constituency.

B. N. Vijay Kumar is the current MLA of the constituency, having won the 2024 Andhra Pradesh Legislative Assembly election from Telugu Desam Party. As of 2019, there are a total of 211,326 electors in the constituency. The constituency was established in 1962, as per the Delimitation Orders (1962).

== Mandals ==
Mandal
Naguluppalapadu
Maddipadu
Santhanuthalapadu
Chimakurthi

== Members of the Legislative Assembly ==
Year	Member	Political party
1962	Tavanam Chenchaiah	Communist Party of India
1967	V. C. K. Rao	Indian National Congress
1972	Aareti Kotaiah	Indian National Congress
1978	Yellaiah Vema	Indian National Congress
1983	Aareti Kotaiah	Telugu Desam Party
1985	Kasukurthi Adhenna	Telugu Desam Party
1989	Venkata Seshu Gurrala	Indian National Congress
1994	Chenchaiah Thavanam	Communist Party of India
1999	David Raju Palaparthi	Telugu Desam Party
2004	Dara Sambaiah	Indian National Congress
2009	B. N. Vijay Kumar	Indian National Congress
2014	Audimulapu Suresh	YSR Congress Party
2019	T. J. R. Sudhakar Babu	YSR Congress Party
2024	B. N. Vijay Kumar	Telugu Desam Party

== Election results ==
=== 1962 ===
1962 Andhra Pradesh Legislative Assembly election: Santhanuthalapadu
Party	Candidate	Votes	%	±%
CPI	Tavanam Chenchaiah	18,649	47.54%	
INC	Vemula Nagaratnam	15,658	39.92%	
Margin of victory		2,991	7.62%	
Turnout		41,496	61.61%	
Registered electors		67,350		
CPI gain from		Swing		

=== 1967 ===
1967 Andhra Pradesh Legislative Assembly election: Santhanuthalapadu
Party	Candidate	Votes	%	±%
INC	V.C.K.Rao	29,478	54.46%	
CPI(M)	Tavanam Chenchaiah	19,657	36.32%	
Margin of victory		9,821	18.15%	
Turnout		56,535	70.96%	
Registered electors		79,669		
INC gain from CPI		Swing		

=== 1972 ===
1972 Andhra Pradesh Legislative Assembly election: Santhanuthalapadu
Party	Candidate	Votes	%	±%
INC	Aareti Kotaiah	26,051	62.61%	
Independent	Tavanam Chenchaiah	12,482	30.00%	
Margin of victory		13,569	32.61%	
Turnout		42,058	46.95%	
Registered electors		89,588		
INC hold		Swing		

=== 1978 ===
1978 Andhra Pradesh Legislative Assembly election: Santhanuthalapadu
Party	Candidate	Votes	%	±%
INC(I)	Vema Yellaiah	34,270	46.82%	
CPI(M)	Tavanam Chenchaiah	20,228	27.63%	
Margin of victory		14,042	19.18%	
Turnout		74,902	63.16%	
Registered electors		118,590		
INC(I) gain from INC		Swing		

=== 1983 ===
1983 Andhra Pradesh Legislative Assembly election: Santhanuthalapadu
Party	Candidate	Votes	%	±%
TDP	Aareti Kotaiah	52,139	63.54%	
INC	Vema Yellaiah	18,280	22.28%	
Margin of victory		33,859	41.27%	
Turnout		83,364	64.93%	
Registered electors		128,381		
TDP gain from INC(I)		Swing		

=== 1989 ===
1989 Andhra Pradesh Legislative Assembly election: Santhanuthalapadu
Party	Candidate	Votes	%	±%
INC	Gurrala Venkata Seshu	58,405	54.40%	
CPI(M)	Tavanam Chenchaiah	46,514	43.33%	
Margin of victory		11,891	11.08%	
Turnout		110,923	63.91%	
Registered electors		172,566		
INC gain from TDP		Swing		

=== 1994 ===
1994 Andhra Pradesh Legislative Assembly election: Santhanuthalapadu
Party	Candidate	Votes	%	±%
CPI(M)	Tavanam Chenchaiah	56,120	54.75%	
INC	Gurrala Venkata Seshu	31,186	30.43%	
Margin of victory		24,934	24.33%	
Turnout		104,375	68.98%	
Registered electors		151,309		
CPI(M) gain from INC		Swing		

=== 1985 ===
1985 Andhra Pradesh Legislative Assembly election: Santhanuthalapadu
Party	Candidate	Votes	%	±%
TDP	Adenna Kasukurthy	48,115	52.67%	
INC	Chinthapalli poulu	40,008	43.80%	
Margin of victory		8,107	8.87%	
Turnout		92,572	66.81%	
Registered electors		138,556		
TDP hold		Swing		

=== 1999 ===
1999 Andhra Pradesh Legislative Assembly election: Santhanuthalapadu
Party	Candidate	Votes	%	±%
TDP	David Raju Palaparthi	56,543	49.55%	
INC	Gurrala Venkata Seshu	46,192	40.48%	
Margin of victory		10,351	9.07%	
Turnout		118,232	64.31%	
Registered electors		183,853		
TDP gain from CPI(M)		Swing		

=== 2004 ===
2004 Andhra Pradesh Legislative Assembly election: Santhanuthalapadu
Party	Candidate	Votes	%	±%
INC	Dara Sambaiah	66,464	55.72	+15.24
TDP	David Raju Palaparthi	50,829	42.61	−8.94
Majority		15,635	13.11	
Turnout		119,290	74.57	+12.50
INC gain from TDP		Swing		

=== 2009 ===
2009 Andhra Pradesh Legislative Assembly election: Santhanuthalapadu
Party	Candidate	Votes	%	±%
INC	B. N. Vijay Kumar	63,769	43.90	−11.82
CPI(M)	Anjaiah Jala	54,238	37.40	
PRP	Kommuri Kanaka Rao	19,129	13.20	
Majority		9,531	6.50	
Turnout		145,171	72.80	−1.77
INC hold		Swing		

=== 2014 ===
2014 Andhra Pradesh Legislative Assembly election: Santhanuthalapadu
Party	Candidate	Votes	%	±%
YSRCP	Audimulapu Suresh	80,954	48.22	
TDP	B. N. Vijay Kumar	79,678	47.46	
Majority		1,276	0.76	
Turnout		167,888	83.19	+10.39
YSRCP gain from INC		Swing		

=== 2019 ===
2019 Andhra Pradesh Legislative Assembly election: Santhanuthalapadu
Party	Candidate	Votes	%	±%
YSRCP	T. J. R. Sudhakar Babu	89,160	49.45%	
TDP	B. N. Vijay Kumar	80,082	44.42%	
CPI(M)	Anjaiah Jala	5,988	3.32%	
Majority		9,078	5.03%	
Turnout		1,80,290	85.28	+2.1
YSRCP hold		Swing		

=== 2024 ===
2024 Andhra Pradesh Legislative Assembly election: Santhanuthalapadu
Party	Candidate	Votes	%	±%
TDP	B. N. Vijay Kumar	105,757	55.69	
YSRCP	Merugu Nagarjuna	75,372	39.69	
INC	Vijesh Raj Palaparthi	2,715	1.43	
NOTA	None Of The Above	1,725	0.91	
Majority		30,385	16.00	
Turnout		1,89,916		
TDP gain from YSRCP		Swing		

== See also ==
- List of constituencies of Andhra Pradesh Legislative Assembly
