= Mandapeta Assembly constituency =

Constituency of the Andhra Pradesh Legislative Assembly, India

Coordinates: 16.87°N 81.93°E

Mandapeta
- Constituency No. 48 for the Andhra Pradesh Legislative Assembly
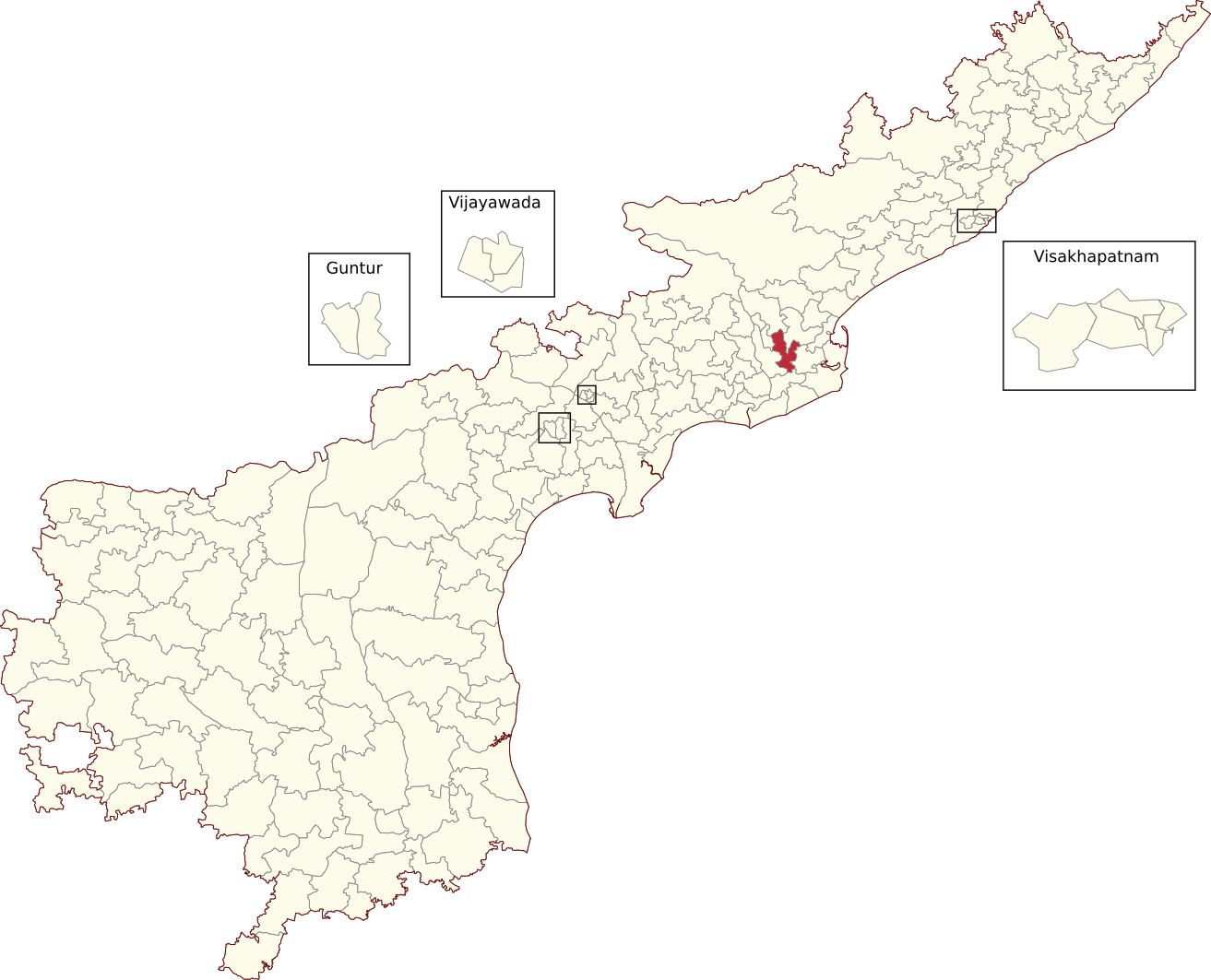
- Location of Mandapeta Assembly constituency within Andhra Pradesh

Constituency details
- Country: India
- Region: South India
- State: Andhra Pradesh
- District: East Godavari
- Lok Sabha constituency: Amalapuram
- Established: 2008
- Total electors: 214,324
- Reservation: None

Member of Legislative Assembly
- 16th Andhra Pradesh Legislative Assembly
- Incumbent V. Jogeswara Rao
- Party: TDP
- Alliance: NDA
- Elected year: 2024

Mandapeta Assembly constituency is a constituency in East Godavari district of Andhra Pradesh that elects representatives to the Andhra Pradesh Legislative Assembly in India. It is one of the seven assembly segments of Amalapuram Lok Sabha constituency.

V. Jogeswara Rao is the current MLA of the constituency, having won the 2024 Andhra Pradesh Legislative Assembly election from Telugu Desam Party. As of 2024, there are a total of 214,324 electors in the constituency. The constituency was established in 2008, as per the Delimitation Orders (2008).

== Mandals ==
The three mandals that form the assembly constituency are:

Mandal
Mandapeta
Rayavaram
Kapileswarapuram

== Members of the Legislative Assembly ==
Year	Member	Political party
2009	V. Jogeswara Rao	Telugu Desam Party
2014	V. Jogeswara Rao	Telugu Desam Party
2019	V. Jogeswara Rao	Telugu Desam Party
2024	V. Jogeswara Rao	Telugu Desam Party

== Election results ==
=== 2024 ===
2024 Andhra Pradesh Legislative Assembly election: Mandapeta
Party	Candidate	Votes	%	±%
TDP	V. Jogeswara Rao	116,309	59.94	
YSRCP	Thota Trimurthulu	71,874	37.04	
INC	Kamana Prabhakara Rao	1,484	0.76	
NOTA	None Of The Above	1,568	0.81	
Majority		44,435	22.89	
Turnout		194,046		
TDP hold		Swing		

=== 2019 ===
2019 Andhra Pradesh Legislative Assembly election: Mandapeta
Party	Candidate	Votes	%	±%
TDP	V. Jogeswara Rao	78,029	41.85	
YSRCP	Pilli Subhash Chandra Bose	67,429	36.17	
JSP	V. Leela Krishna	35,173	18.87	
Majority		10,600	5.68	
Turnout		1,80,631	96.89	
TDP hold		Swing		

=== 2014 ===
2014 Andhra Pradesh Legislative Assembly election: Mandapeta
Party	Candidate	Votes	%	±%
TDP	V. Jogeswara Rao	100,113	58.34	
YSRCP	G. V. Swamy Naidu	64,099	37.35	
Majority		36,014	20.99	
Turnout		171,609	87.59	+4.87
TDP hold		Swing		

=== 2009 ===
2009 Andhra Pradesh Legislative Assembly election: Mandapeta
Party	Candidate	Votes	%	±%
TDP	V. Jogeswara Rao	68,104	43.57	
PRP	V. V. S. S. Chowdhary	50,664	32.41	
INC	K. C. Bikkina	26,571	17.00	
Majority		17,440	11.16	
Turnout		156,616	82.72	
TDP win (new seat)				

== See also ==
- List of constituencies of the Andhra Pradesh Legislative Assembly
