= Vanamadi Venkateswara Rao =

Indian politician

Member of the Andhra Pradesh Legislative Assembly
- Incumbent
- Assumed office 2024
- Preceded by: Dwarampudi Chandrasekhar Reddy
- Constituency: Kakinada City
- In office 2014–2019
- Preceded by: Dwarampudi Chandrasekhar Reddy
- Succeeded by: Dwarampudi Chandrasekhar Reddy
- Constituency: Kakinada City

Personal details
- Party: Telugu Desam Party

Vanamadi Venkateswara Rao, popularly known as Konda Babu, is an Indian politician from Andhra Pradesh. He is a member of Telugu Desam Party. He has been elected as the Member of the Legislative Assembly (MLA) representing the Kakinada City Assembly constituency in 2024 Andhra Pradesh Legislative Assembly elections.
