= Yerragondapalem =

- Village
- Interactive map of Yerragondapalem
- Location in Andhra Pradesh, India Yerragondapalem (India)
- Coordinates: 16.0472°N 79.3073°E
- Country: India
- State: Andhra Pradesh
- District: Markapuram
- Mandal: Yerragondapalem

Area
  - Total: 29.49 km^{2} (11.39 sq mi)

Population (2011)
  - Total: 19,398
  - Density: 657.8/km^{2} (1,704/sq mi)

Languages
  - Official: Telugu
- Time zone: UTC+5:30 (IST)
- PIN: 523327
- Telephone code: +91–8403
- Vehicle registration: AP

Yerragondapalem is a village in Markapuram district of the Indian state of Andhra Pradesh. It is the mandal headquarters of Yerragondapalem mandal in Markapur revenue division.
