= B. N. Vijay Kumar =

Indian politician

Member of the Andhra Pradesh Legislative Assembly
- Incumbent
- Assumed office 4 June 2024

Personal details
- Party: Telugu Desam Party

Bommaji Niranjan Vijay Kumar (born in 1967) is an Indian politician from Andhra Pradesh. He is an MLA of Telugu Desam Party from Santhanuthalapadu Assembly Constituency in Prakasam district. He won the 2024 Andhra Pradesh Legislative Assembly election.

== Early life and education ==
Kumar hails from Prakasam district. His father Bommaji Danam was an IAS officer. He did his B.E. in mechanical engineering in 1990 from Osmania University, Hyderabad.

== Career ==
Kumar started his political career in 2009, and he was elected as a MLA for Santhanuthalapadu Assembly constituency in the 2009 Andhra Pradesh Legislative Assembly election. He was re-elected in the 2014 Andhra Pradesh Legislative Assembly election representing Telugu Desam Party. He served as incharge of the party for Santhanuthalapadu constituency. He won again in the 2024 from Santhanuthalapadu Assembly constituency representing TDP defeating Nagarjuna Merugu of YSR Congress Party by a margin of 30,385 votes.
