= 2024 Andhra Pradesh Legislative Assembly election =

- 13 May 2024

All 175 seats in the Andhra Pradesh Legislative Assembly 88 seats needed for a majority
- Opinion polls
- Registered: 41,333,702
- Turnout: 33,838,349 (81.87%) ▲1.47%
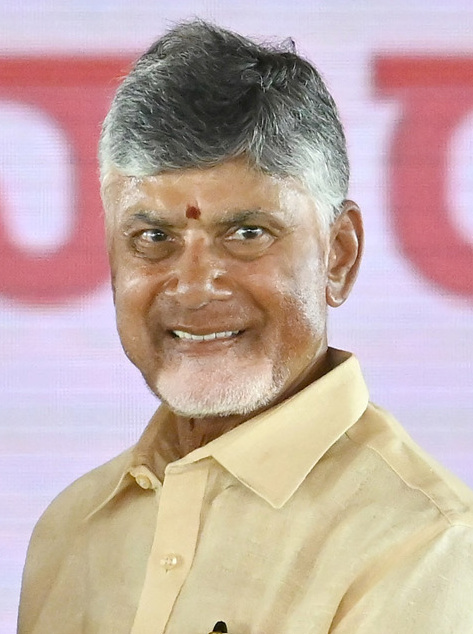

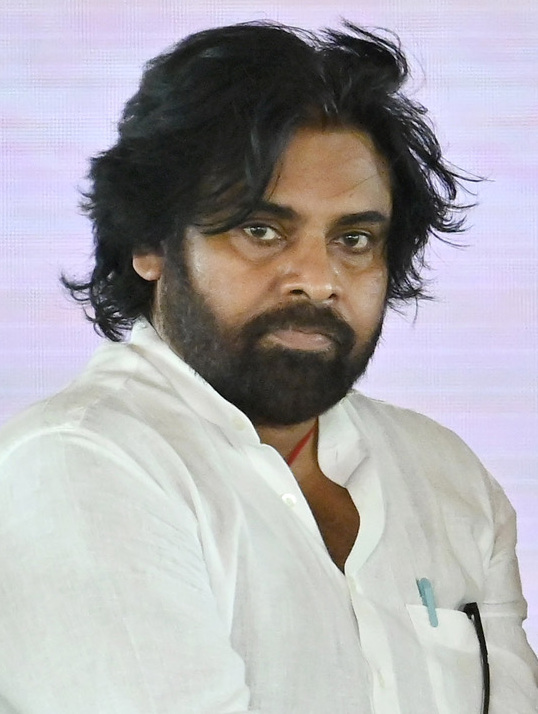

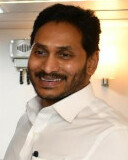

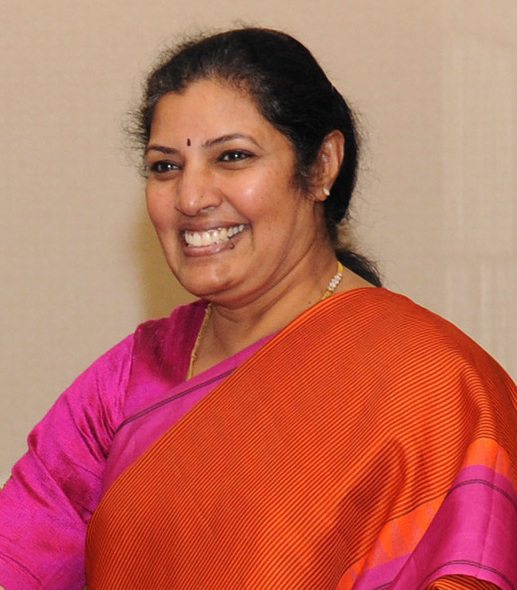
	Majority party	Minority party
Leader	N. Chandrababu Naidu	Pawan Kalyan
Party	TDP	JSP
Alliance	Kutami	Kutami
Leader since	1995	2014
Leader's seat	Kuppam (won)	Pithapuram (won)
Last election	23 seats, 39.17%	1 seat, 5.53%
Seats won	135	21
Seat change	▲112	▲20
Popular vote	15,384,576	2,317,747
Percentage	45.60%	6.87%
Swing	▲6.43 pp	▲1.32 pp
	Third party	Fourth party
Leader	Y. S. Jagan Mohan Reddy	Daggubati Purandeswari
Party	YSRCP	BJP
Alliance		Kutami
Leader since	2011	2023
Leader's seat	Pulivendla (won)	Did not contest (Note: Contested and won from the Rajahmundry Lok Sabha constituency in the simultaneously conducted 2024 Indian general election in Andhra Pradesh.)
Last election	151 seats, 49.95%	0 seats, 0.84%
Seats won	11	8
Seat change	▼140	▲8
Popular vote	13,284,134	953,977
Percentage	39.38%	2.83%
Swing	▼10.57 pp	▲1.99 pp

Chief Minister before election
Y. S. Jagan Mohan Reddy
YSRCP
Chief Minister after election
N. Chandrababu Naidu
TDP

The 2024 Andhra Pradesh Legislative Assembly election was held in the Indian state of Andhra Pradesh on 13 May 2024 for constituting the sixteenth Andhra Pradesh Assembly. They were held alongside the 2024 Indian general election. The election results were declared on 4 June 2024.

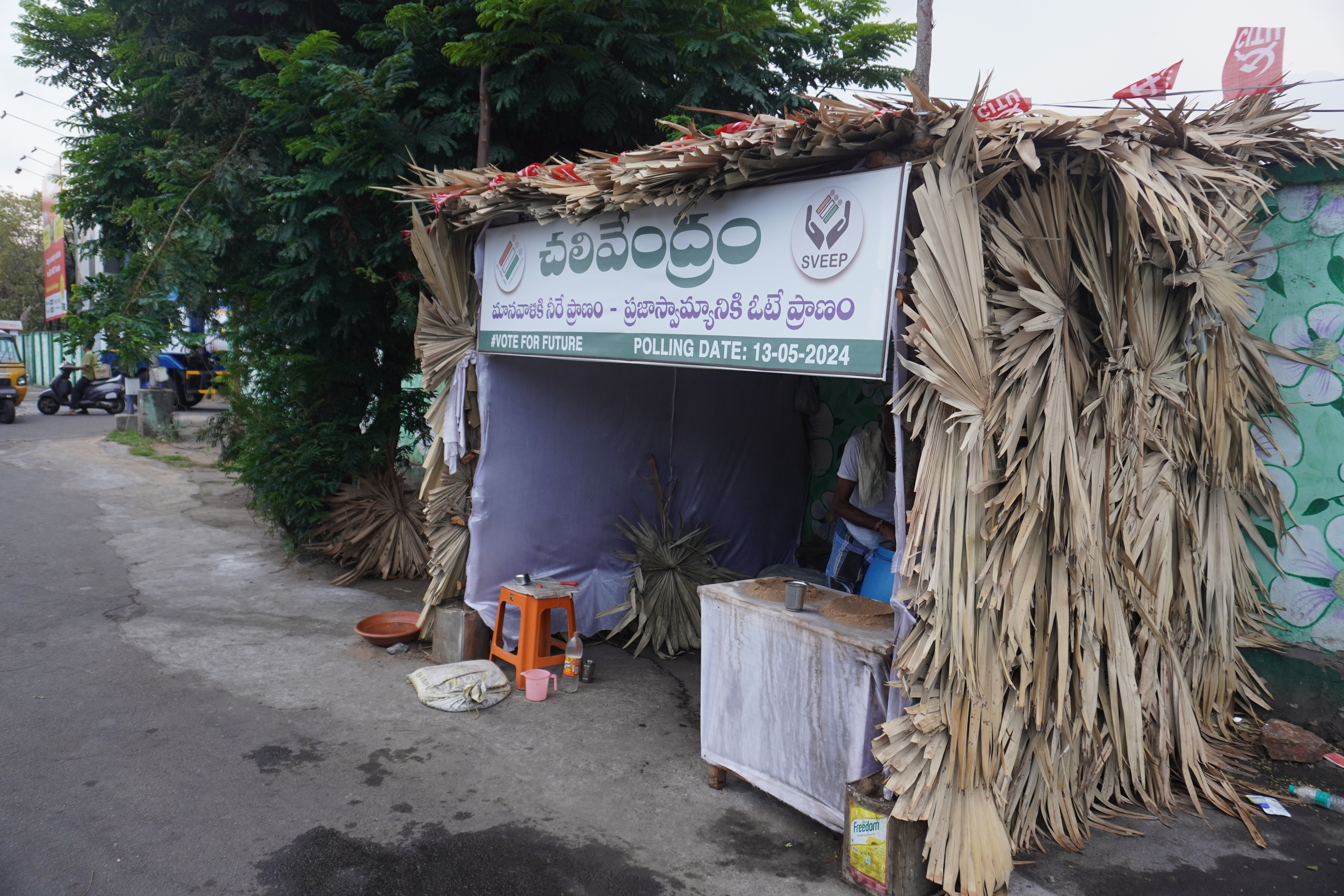
Drinking water stall by ECI SVEEP in Vizag to increase voter awareness

The political alliance Kutami, led by the Telugu Desam Party (TDP), won the election in a landslide, winning 164 of the 175 seats. The TDP won 135 out of 144 contested seats. In comparison, the Janasena Party (JSP) won all the 21 seats it contested and the Bharatiya Janata Party (BJP) won 8 out of 10 contested seats. The incumbent YSR Congress Party (YSRCP) only won 11 seats. The Indian National Developmental Inclusive Alliance (INDIA) comprising Indian National Congress (INC), Communist Party of India (CPI) and Communist Party of India (Marxist) (CPI(M)) failed to win any seats, for the third time continuously in a row.

== Background ==
The tenure of Andhra Pradesh Legislative Assembly was scheduled to end on 11 June 2024. The previous assembly elections were held in April 2019. After the 2019 election, YSR Congress Party formed the state government, with Y. S. Jagan Mohan Reddy becoming the Chief Minister.

== Schedule ==
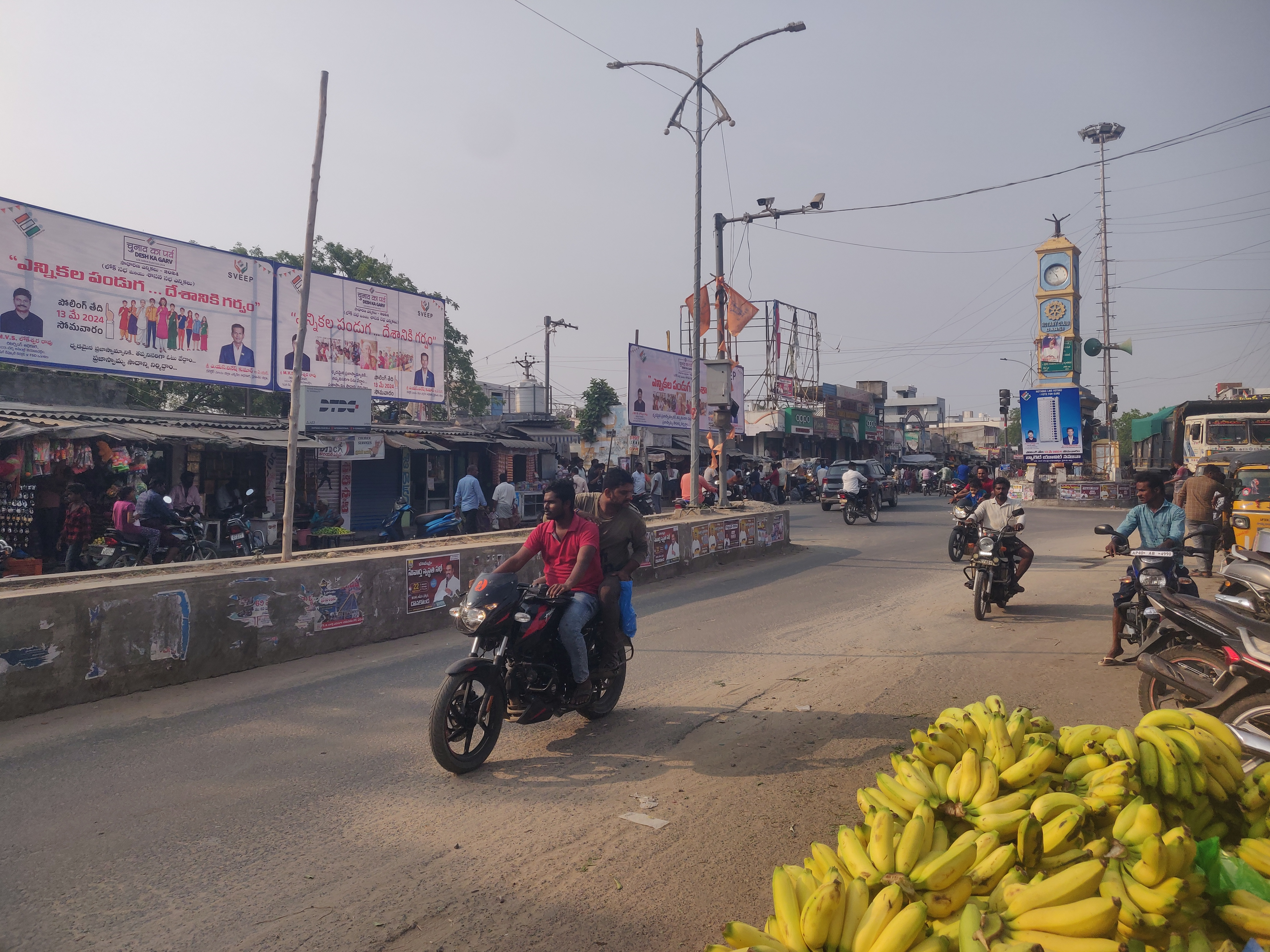
2024 election outdoor advertisements by Election Commission in Darsi

The schedule of the election was announced by the Election Commission of India on 16 March 2024.

Poll event	Date
Date of announcement	16 March 2024
Notification date	18 April 2024
Last date for filing nomination	25 April 2024
Scrutiny of nomination	26 April 2024
Last date for withdrawal of nomination	29 April 2024
Date of poll	13 May 2024
Date of counting of votes	4 June 2024

== Parties and alliances ==
Seat distribution of Kutami

Seat distribution of INDIA

Alliance/Party		Flag	Symbol	Leader	Seats contested	
YSR Congress Party				Y. S. Jagan Mohan Reddy	175	
Kutami	Telugu Desam Party			N. Chandrababu Naidu	144	175
Kutami	Janasena Party			Pawan Kalyan	21	175
Kutami	Bharatiya Janata Party			Daggubati Purandeswari	10	175
INDIA	Indian National Congress			Y. S. Sharmila	159	175
INDIA	Communist Party of India (Marxist)			V. Srinivasa Rao	8	175
INDIA	Communist Party of India			K. Ramakrishna	8	175

== Candidates ==
District	Constituency		YSRCP		Kutami		INDIA	
District	No.	Name	Party	Candidate	Party	Candidate	Party	Candidate
Srikakulam	1	Ichchapuram	YSRCP	Piriya Vijaya	TDP	Bendalam Ashok	INC	Masupatri Chakravarthy Reddy
Srikakulam	2	Palasa	YSRCP	Seediri Appalaraju	TDP	Gouthu Sireesha	INC	Majji Trinadh Babu
Srikakulam	3	Tekkali	YSRCP	Duvvada Srinivas	TDP	Kinjarapu Atchannaidu	INC	Killi Kruparani
Srikakulam	4	Pathapatnam	YSRCP	Reddy Shanthi	TDP	Mamidi Govinda Rao	INC	Koppurothu Venkata Rao
Srikakulam	5	Srikakulam	YSRCP	Dharmana Prasada Rao	TDP	Gondu Shankar	INC	Ambati Krishna Rao
Srikakulam	6	Amadalavalasa	YSRCP	Thammineni Seetharam	TDP	Koona Ravi Kumar	INC	Sannapala Annajirao
Srikakulam	7	Etcherla	YSRCP	Gorle Kiran Kumar	BJP	Nadikuditi Eswara Rao	INC	Karimajji Malleswar Rao
Srikakulam	8	Narasannapeta	YSRCP	Dharmana Krishna Das	TDP	Baggu Ramana Murthy	INC	Mantri Narasimha Murthy
Vizianagaram	9	Rajam (SC)	YSRCP	Tale Rajesh	TDP	Kondru Murali Mohan	INC	Kambala Rajavardhan
Parvathipuram Manyam	10	Palakonda (ST)	YSRCP	Viswasarayi Kalavathi	JSP	Nimmaka Jaya Krishna	INC	Sarava Chanti Babu
Parvathipuram Manyam	11	Kurupam (ST)	YSRCP	Pamula Pushpa Sreevani	TDP	Thoyaka Jagadeeswari	CPI(M)	M. Ramana
Parvathipuram Manyam	12	Parvathipuram (SC)	YSRCP	Alajangi Jogarao	TDP	Bonela Vijay Chandra	INC	Battina Mohan Rao
Parvathipuram Manyam	13	Salur (ST)	YSRCP	Peedika Rajanna Dora	TDP	Gummidi Sandhyarani	INC	Muvvala Pushpa Rao
Vizianagaram	14	Bobbili	YSRCP	S. V. China Appala Naidu	TDP	Baby Nayana	INC	Maripi Vidyasagar
Vizianagaram	15	Cheepurupalli	YSRCP	Botsa Satyanarayana	TDP	Kimidi Kala Venkat Rao	INC	Aadi Narayana Jammu
Vizianagaram	16	Gajapathinagaram	YSRCP	Botcha Appalanarasayya	TDP	Kondapalli Srinivas	INC	Dola Srinivas
Vizianagaram	17	Nellimarla	YSRCP	Baddukonda Appala Naidu	JSP	Lokam Naga Madhavi	INC	Saragada Ramesh Kumar
Vizianagaram	18	Vizianagaram	YSRCP	Kolagatla Veerabhadra Swamy	TDP	Pusapati Aditi Vijayalakshmi	INC	Satish Kumar Sunkari
Vizianagaram	19	Srungavarapukota	YSRCP	Kadubandi Srinivasa Rao	TDP	Kolla Lalitha Kumari	INC	Gedela Tirupathi
Visakhapatnam	20	Bhimili	YSRCP	Muttamsetti Srinivasa Rao	TDP	Ganta Srinivasa Rao	INC	Addala Venkata Varma Raju
Visakhapatnam	21	Visakhapatnam East	YSRCP	M. V. V. Satyanarayana	TDP	Velagapudi Ramakrishna Babu	INC	Guthula Srinivas Rao
Visakhapatnam	22	Visakhapatnam South	YSRCP	Vasupalli Ganesh Kumar	JSP	Vamsi Krishna Srinivas	INC	Vasupalli Santosh
Visakhapatnam	23	Visakhapatnam North	YSRCP	Kammila Kannaparaju	BJP	Penmetsa Vishnu Kumar Raju	INC	Lakkaraju Rama Rao
Visakhapatnam	24	Visakhapatnam West	YSRCP	Adari Anand Kumar	TDP	P. G. V. R. Naidu	CPI	Attili Vimala
Visakhapatnam	25	Gajuwaka	YSRCP	Gudivada Amarnath	TDP	Palla Srinivas Rao Yadav	CPI(M)	Maradana Jaggunaidu
Anakapalli	26	Chodavaram	YSRCP	Karanam Dharmasri	TDP	Kalidindi Suryana Naga Sanyasi Raju	INC	Jagat Srinivas
Anakapalli	27	Madugula	YSRCP	Eerli Anuradha	TDP	Bandaru Satyanarayana Murthy	INC	B. B. S. Srinivas Rao
Alluri Sitharama Raju	28	Araku Valley (ST)	YSRCP	Regam Matyalingam	BJP	Pangi Rajarao	INC	Setti Gangadharaswamy
Alluri Sitharama Raju	29	Paderu (ST)	YSRCP	Matsyarasa Visweswara Raju	TDP	Giddi Eswari	INC	Sataka Bullibabu
Anakapalli	30	Anakapalli	YSRCP	Malasala Bharath Kumar	JSP	Konathala Ramakrishna	INC	Illa Rama Gangadhara Rao
Visakhapatnam	31	Pendurthi	YSRCP	Annamreddy Adeep Raj	JSP	Panchakarla Ramesh Babu	INC	Piridi Bhagat
Anakapalli	32	Elamanchili	YSRCP	Kanna Babu	JSP	Sundarapu Vijay Kumar	INC	Tar Narsing Rao
Anakapalli	33	Payakaraopet (SC)	YSRCP	Kambala Jogulu	TDP	Vangalapudi Anitha	INC	Boni Tata Rao
Anakapalli	34	Narsipatnam	YSRCP	Uma Shankar Ganesh	TDP	Chintakayala Ayyanna Patrudu	INC	Ruthala Sriramamurthy
Kakinada	35	Tuni	YSRCP	Dadisetty Raja	TDP	Yanamala Divya	INC	Gelam Srinivasa Rao
Kakinada	36	Prathipadu (Kakinada)	YSRCP	Varupula Subbarao	TDP	Varupula Satya Prabha	INC	N. V. V. Satyanarayana
Kakinada	37	Pithapuram	YSRCP	Vanga Geetha	JSP	Pawan Kalyan	INC	Madepalli Satyananda Rao
Kakinada	38	Kakinada Rural	YSRCP	Kurasala Kannababu	JSP	Pantham Venkateswara Rao	INC	Pilli Satya Lakshmi
Kakinada	39	Peddapuram	YSRCP	Davuluru Dora Babu	TDP	Nimmakayala Chinarajappa	INC	Dorababu Tummala
East Godavari	40	Anaparthy	YSRCP	Sathi Suryanarayana Reddy	BJP	Nallamilli Ramakrishna Reddy	INC	Yella Srinivasa Rao
Kakinada	41	Kakinada City	YSRCP	Dwarampudi Chandrasekhar Reddy	TDP	Vanamadi Venkateswara Rao	INC	Chekka Nookaraju
Konaseema	42	Ramachandrapuram	YSRCP	Pilli Surya Prakash	TDP	Vasamsetti Subhash	INC	Kota Srinivasa Rao
Konaseema	43	Mummidivaram	YSRCP	Ponnada Venkata Satish Kumar	TDP	Datla Subbaraju	INC	Palepu Dharma Rao
Konaseema	44	Amalapuram (SC)	YSRCP	Pinipe Viswarup	TDP	Aithabathula Anandarao	INC	Aithabathula Subhashini
Konaseema	45	Razole (SC)	YSRCP	Gollapalli Surya Rao	JSP	Deva Varaprasad	INC	Sarella Prasanna Kumar
Konaseema	46	Gannavaram (Konaseema) (SC)	YSRCP	Vipparthi Venugopal Rao	JSP	Giddi Satyanarayana	INC	Kondeti Chittibabu
Konaseema	47	Kothapeta	YSRCP	Chirla Jaggi Reddy	TDP	Bandaru Satyananda Rao	INC	Routhu Eswara Rao
Konaseema	48	Mandapeta	YSRCP	Thota Trimurthulu	TDP	V. Jogeswara Rao	INC	Kamana Prabhakara Rao
East Godavari	49	Rajanagaram	YSRCP	Jakkampudi Raja	JSP	Bathula Balaramakrishna	INC	Mundru Venkata Srinivas
East Godavari	50	Rajahmundry City	YSRCP	Margani Bharat	TDP	Adireddy Srinivas	INC	Boda Lakshmi Venkata Prasanna
East Godavari	51	Rajahmundry Rural	YSRCP	C. S. Venugopala Krishna	TDP	Gorantla Butchaiah Chowdary	INC	Balepalli Muralidhar
Kakinada	52	Jaggampeta	YSRCP	Thota Narasimham	TDP	Jyothula Nehru	INC	Marothi VV Ganeswara Rao
Alluri Sitharama Raju	53	Rampachodavaram (ST)	YSRCP	Nagulapalli Dhanalakshmi	TDP	Miriyala Sirisha Devi	CPI(M)	Lotha Rama Rao
East Godavari	54	Kovvur (SC)	YSRCP	Talari Venkat Rao	TDP	Muppidi Venkateswara Rao	INC	Arigela Aruna Kumari
East Godavari	55	Nidadavole	YSRCP	Geddam Srinivas Naidu	JSP	Kandula Durgesh	INC	Peddireddi Subba Rao
West Godavari	56	Achanta	YSRCP	Cherukuvada Sri Ranganadha Raju	TDP	Pithani Satyanarayana	INC	Nekkanti Venkata Satyanarayana
West Godavari	57	Palakollu	YSRCP	Gudala Sri Hari Gopala Rao	TDP	Nimmala Rama Naidu	INC	Kolukuluri Arjun Rao
West Godavari	58	Narasapuram	YSRCP	Mudunuri Prasad Raju	JSP	Bommidi Narayana Nayakar	INC	Kanuri Udaya Baskara Krishna Prasad
West Godavari	59	Bhimavaram	YSRCP	Grandhi Srinivas	JSP	Pulaparthi Ramanjaneyulu	INC	Ankem Seetaramu
West Godavari	60	Undi	YSRCP	P. V. L. Narasimha Raju	TDP	Raghu Rama Krishna Raju	INC	Vegesha Venkata Gopala Krishnam
West Godavari	61	Tanuku	YSRCP	Karumuri Venkata Nageswara Rao	TDP	Arimilli Radha Krishna	INC	Kadali Rama Rao
West Godavari	62	Tadepalligudem	YSRCP	Kottu Satyanarayana	JSP	Bolisetti Srinivas	INC	Marneedi Sekhar
Eluru	63	Unguturu	YSRCP	Puppala Srinivasa Rao	JSP	Patsamatla Dharmaraju	INC	Pathapati Hari Kumara Raju
Eluru	64	Denduluru	YSRCP	Kotaru Abbaya Chowdary	TDP	Chintamaneni Prabhakar	INC	Alapati Narasimha Murthy
Eluru	65	Eluru	YSRCP	Alla Nani	TDP	Badeti Chanti	CPI	Bandi Venkateswara Rao
East Godavari	66	Gopalapuram (SC)	YSRCP	Taneti Vanitha	TDP	Maddipati Venkata Raju	INC	Sodadasi Martin Luther
Eluru	67	Polavaram (ST)	YSRCP	Tellam Rajyalakshmi	JSP	Chirri Balaraju	INC	Srujana Duvvela
Eluru	68	Chintalapudi (SC)	YSRCP	Kambham Vijayaraju	TDP	Songa Roshan Kumar	INC	Vunnamatla Rakada Eliza
NTR	69	Tiruvuru (SC)	YSRCP	Nallagatla Swamy Das	TDP	Kolikapudi Srinivasa Rao	INC	Lam Thantiya Kumari
Eluru	70	Nuzvid	YSRCP	Meka Venkata Pratap Apparao	TDP	Kolusu Parthasarathy	INC	Krishna Maridu
Krishna	71	Gannavaram (Krishna)	YSRCP	Vallabhaneni Vamsi Mohan	TDP	Yarlagadda Venkata Rao	CPI(M)	K. Venkateswara Rao
Krishna	72	Gudivada	YSRCP	Kodali Nani	TDP	Venigandla Ramu	INC	Vaddadi Govinda Rao
Eluru	73	Kaikalur	YSRCP	Dulam Nageswara Rao	BJP	Kamineni Srinivas	INC	Boddu Noble
Krishna	74	Pedana	YSRCP	Uppala Ramu	TDP	Kagitha Krishna Prasad	INC	Sonti Nagaraju
Krishna	75	Machilipatnam	YSRCP	Perni Krishnamurthy	TDP	Kollu Ravindra	INC	Abdul Mateen
Krishna	76	Avanigadda	YSRCP	Simhadri Ramesh Babu	JSP	Mandali Buddha Prasad	INC	Andee Srirama Murthy
Krishna	77	Pamarru (SC)	YSRCP	Kaile Anil Kumar	TDP	Varla Kumar Raja	INC	D. Y. Das
Krishna	78	Penamaluru	YSRCP	Jogi Ramesh	TDP	Bode Prasad	INC	Elisala Subrahmanyam
NTR	79	Vijayawada West	YSRCP	Shaik Asif	BJP	Sujana Chowdary	CPI	G. Koteswara Rao
NTR	80	Vijayawada Central	YSRCP	Vellampalli Srinivas	TDP	Bonda Umamaheswara Rao	CPI(M)	Ch. Babu Rao
NTR	81	Vijayawada East	YSRCP	Devineni Avinash	TDP	Gadde Rama Mohan	INC	Pongupati Nancharayya
NTR	82	Mylavaram	YSRCP	Sarnala Tirupathi Rao Yadav	TDP	Vasantha Krishna Prasad	INC	Borra Kiran
NTR	83	Nandigama (SC)	YSRCP	Monditoka Jagan Mohana Rao	TDP	Tangirala Sowmya	INC	Manda Vajraiah
NTR	84	Jaggayyapeta	YSRCP	Samineni Udaya Bhanu	TDP	Rajagopal Sreeram (Tataiah)	INC	Karnati Apparao
Palnadu	85	Pedakurapadu	YSRCP	Namburu Sankar Rao	TDP	Bhashyam Praveen	INC	Pamidi Nageshwar Rao
Guntur	86	Tadikonda (SC)	YSRCP	Mekathoti Sucharitha	TDP	Tenali Sravan Kumar	INC	Manichala Sushil Raja
Guntur	87	Mangalagiri	YSRCP	Murugudu Lavanya	TDP	Nara Lokesh	CPI(M)	Jonna Shiva Shankar
Guntur	88	Ponnuru	YSRCP	Ambati Murali	TDP	Dhulipalla Narendra Kumar	INC	Jakka Ravindra Nath
Bapatla	89	Vemuru (SC)	YSRCP	Varikuti Ashok Babu	TDP	Nakka Ananda Babu	INC	Buraga Subba Rao
Bapatla	90	Repalle	YSRCP	Evuru Ganesh	TDP	Anagani Satya Prasad	INC	Mopidevi Srinivas Rao
Guntur	91	Tenali	YSRCP	Annabathuni Siva Kumar	JSP	Nadendla Manohar	INC	Chandu Sambasivudu
Bapatla	92	Bapatla	YSRCP	Kona Raghupathi	TDP	Vegesana Narendra Varma Raju	INC	Ganta Anji Babu
Guntur	93	Prathipadu (Guntur) (SC)	YSRCP	Balasani Kiran Kumar	TDP	Burla Ramanjaneyulu	INC	Korivi Vinaya Kumar
Guntur	94	Guntur West	YSRCP	Vidadala Rajini	TDP	Galla Madhavi	INC	Rajachakonda John Babu
Guntur	95	Guntur East	YSRCP	Shaik Noori Fathima	TDP	Muhammad Nazeer Khan	INC	Shaik Mastan Valli
Palnadu	96	Chilakaluripet	YSRCP	K. Manohar Naidu	TDP	Prathipati Pulla Rao	INC	Maddula Radha Krishna
Palnadu	97	Narasaraopeta	YSRCP	Gopireddy Srinivasa Reddy	TDP	Chadalavada Aravinda Babu	INC	Shaik Mahaboob Basha
Palnadu	98	Sattenapalle	YSRCP	Ambati Rambabu	TDP	Kanna Lakshminarayana	INC	Chandra Paul Chukka
Palnadu	99	Vinukonda	YSRCP	Bolla Brahma Naidu	TDP	G. V. Anjaneyulu	INC	Chenna Srinivas Rao
Palnadu	100	Gurajala	YSRCP	Kasu Mahesh Reddy	TDP	Yarapathineni Srinivasa Rao	INC	Tiyyagura Yalamanda Reddy
Palnadu	101	Macherla	YSRCP	Pinnelli Ramakrishna Reddy	TDP	Julakanti Brahmananda Reddy	INC	Yeramala Ramachandra Reddy
Prakasam	102	Yerragondapalem (SC)	YSRCP	Tatiparthi Chandrasekhar	TDP	Guduri Erixion Babu	INC	Budhala Ajitha Rao
Prakasam	103	Darsi	YSRCP	Buchepalli Siva Prasad Reddy	TDP	Gottipati Lakshmi	INC	Putluri Konda Reddy
Bapatla	104	Parchur	YSRCP	Yadam Balaji	TDP	Yeluri Sambasiva Rao	INC	Nallagorla Siva Srilakshmi Jyothi
Bapatla	105	Addanki	YSRCP	Panem Hanimi Reddy	TDP	Gottipati Ravikumar	INC	Adusumalli Kishore Babu
Bapatla	106	Chirala	YSRCP	Karanam Venkatesh	TDP	Madduluri Malakondaiah Yadav	INC	Amanchi Krishna Mohan
Prakasam	107	Santhanuthalapadu (SC)	YSRCP	Merugu Nagarjuna	TDP	B. N. Vijay Kumar	INC	Vijesh Raj Palaparthi
Prakasam	108	Ongole	YSRCP	Balineni Srinivasa Reddy	TDP	Damacharla Janardhana Rao	INC	Turakapalli Nagalakshmi
Nellore	109	Kandukur	YSRCP	Burra Madhu Sudhan Yadav	TDP	Inturi Nageswara Rao	INC	Sayed Gouse Mohiddin
Prakasam	110	Kondapi (SC)	YSRCP	Audimulapu Suresh	TDP	Dola Sree Bala Veeranjaneya Swamy	INC	Pasumarthi Sudhakar
Prakasam	111	Markapuram	YSRCP	Anna Rambabu	TDP	Kandula Narayana Reddy	INC	Javeed Anwar
Prakasam	112	Giddalur	YSRCP	K. P. Nagarjuna Reddy	TDP	Muthumula Ashok Reddy	INC	Pagadala Pedda Rangaswamy
Prakasam	113	Kanigiri	YSRCP	Daddala Narayana Yadav	TDP	Mukku Ugra Narasimha Reddy	INC	Deverapalli Subbareddy
Nellore	114	Kavali	YSRCP	Ramireddy Pratap Kumar Reddy	TDP	Dagumati Venkata Krishna Reddy	INC	Podalakuri Kalyan
Nellore	115	Atmakur	YSRCP	Mekapati Vikram Reddy	TDP	Anam Ramanarayana Reddy	INC	Chevuru Sreedhara Reddy
Nellore	116	Kovur	YSRCP	Nallapareddy Prasanna Kumar Reddy	TDP	Vemireddy Prashanti Reddy	INC	Nebrambaka Mohan
Nellore	117	Nellore City	YSRCP	Mohammad Khaleel	TDP	Ponguru Narayana	CPI(M)	M. Ramesh
Nellore	118	Nellore Rural	YSRCP	Adala Prabhakara Reddy	TDP	Kotamreddy Sridhar Reddy	INC	Shaik Fayaz
Nellore	119	Sarvepalli	YSRCP	Kakani Govardhan Reddy	TDP	Somireddy Chandra Mohan Reddy	INC	P.V. Srikanth Reddy
Tirupati	120	Gudur (SC)	YSRCP	Meruga Murali	TDP	Pasam Sunil Kumar	INC	U Ramakrishna Rao
Tirupati	121	Sullurpeta (SC)	YSRCP	Kiliveti Sanjeevaiah	TDP	Nelavala Vijayasree	INC	Chandanamudi Shiva
Tirupati	122	Venkatagiri	YSRCP	Nedurumalli Ramkumar Reddy	TDP	Korugondla Ramakrishna	INC	Panta Srinivasulu
Nellore	123	Udayagiri	YSRCP	Mekapati Rajagopal Reddy	TDP	Kakarla Suresh	INC	Somu Anilkumar Reddy
Kadapa	124	Badvel (SC)	YSRCP	Dasari Sudha	BJP	Bojja Roshanna	INC	Neerugattu Dora Vijaya Jyothi
Annamayya	125	Rajampet	YSRCP	Akepati Amarnath Reddy	TDP	Sugavasi Bala Subramanyam	CPI	Bhukya Viswanath Naik
Kadapa	126	Kadapa	YSRCP	Amzath Basha Shaik Bepari	TDP	Reddeppagari Madhavi Reddy	INC	Tumman Kalyal Aszal Alikhan
Annamayya	127	Kodur (SC)	YSRCP	Koramutla Srinivasulu	JSP	Arava Sreedhar	INC	Gosala Devi
Annamayya	128	Rayachoti	YSRCP	Gadikota Srikanth Reddy	TDP	Mandipalli Ramprasad Reddy	INC	Shaik Alla Bakash
Kadapa	129	Pulivendla	YSRCP	Y. S. Jagan Mohan Reddy	TDP	Mareddy Ravindranatha Reddy	INC	Mulam Reddy Dhruva Kumar Reddy
Kadapa	130	Kamalapuram	YSRCP	Pochimareddy Ravindranath Reddy	TDP	Putha Krishna Chaitanya Reddy	CPI	Gali Chandra
Kadapa	131	Jammalamadugu	YSRCP	Mule Sudheer Reddy	BJP	Ch. Adinarayana Reddy	INC	Brahmanareddy Pamula
Kadapa	132	Proddatur	YSRCP	Rachamallu Siva Prasad Reddy	TDP	Nandyala Varada Rajulu Reddy	INC	Shaik Poola Mohammed Nazeer
Kadapa	133	Mydukur	YSRCP	Settipalli Raghurami Reddy	TDP	Putta Sudhakar Yadav	INC	Gundlakunta Sriramulu
Nandyal	134	Allagadda	YSRCP	Gangula Brijendra Reddy	TDP	Bhuma Akhila Priya	INC	Baragodla Hussain
Nandyal	135	Srisailam	YSRCP	Silpa Chakrapani Reddy	TDP	Budda Rajasekhar Reddy	INC	Asar Syed Ismail
Nandyal	136	Nandikotkur (SC)	YSRCP	Dara Sudheer	TDP	Githa Jayasurya	INC	Thoguru Arthur
Kurnool	137	Kurnool	YSRCP	A. Mohammad Imtiaz Ahmed	TDP	T. G. Bharath	INC	Shaik Jelani Basha
Kurnool	138	Panyam	YSRCP	Katasani Rambhupal Reddy	TDP	Gowru Charitha Reddy	CPI(M)	D. Ghous Desai
Nandyal	139	Nandyal	YSRCP	Silpa Ravi Chandra Kishore Reddy	TDP	N. Md. Farooq	INC	Gokula Krishna Reddy
Nandyal	140	Banaganapalle	YSRCP	Katasani Rami Reddy	TDP	B. C. Janardhan Reddy	INC	Gutam Pullaiah
Nandyal	141	Dhone	YSRCP	Buggana Rajendranath Reddy	TDP	Kotla Jayasurya Prakasha Reddy	INC	Garlapati Madhuleti Swami
Kurnool	142	Pattikonda	YSRCP	Kangati Sreedevi	TDP	K. E. Shyam Kumar	CPI	P. Ramachandraiah
Kurnool	143	Kodumur (SC)	YSRCP	Audimulapu Sateesh	TDP	Boggula Dastagiri	INC	Paregella Murali Krishna
Kurnool	144	Yemmiganur	YSRCP	Butta Renuka	TDP	Jaya Nageswara Reddy	INC	Marumulla Kashim Vali
Kurnool	145	Mantralayam	YSRCP	Y. Balanagi Reddy	TDP	Raghavendra Reddy	INC	P. S. Murali Krishnaraju
Kurnool	146	Adoni	YSRCP	Y. Sai Prasad Reddy	BJP	P. V. Parthasarathi	INC	Golla Ramesh
Kurnool	147	Alur	YSRCP	Busine Virupakshi	TDP	B. Veerabhadra Gowd	INC	Naveen Kishore Arakatla
Anantapur	148	Rayadurg	YSRCP	Mettu Govinda Reddy	TDP	Kalava Srinivasulu	INC	M. B. Chinna Appiah
Anantapur	149	Uravakonda	YSRCP	Y. Visweswara Reddy	TDP	Payyavula Keshav	INC	Y. Madhusudan Reddy
Anantapur	150	Guntakal	YSRCP	Y. Venkatarama Reddy	TDP	Gummanur Jayaram	INC	Kavali Prabhakar
Anantapur	151	Tadipatri	YSRCP	Kethireddy Pedda Reddy	TDP	J. C. Ashmit Reddy	INC	Gujjala Nagi Reddy
Anantapur	152	Singanamala (SC)	YSRCP	M. Veeranjaneyulu	TDP	Bandaru Sravani Sree	INC	Sake Sailajanath
Anantapur	153	Anantapur Urban	YSRCP	Anantha Venkatarami Reddy	TDP	Daggupati Venkateswara Prasad	CPI	C. Jafar
Anantapur	154	Kalyandurg	YSRCP	Talari Rangaiah	TDP	Amilineni Surendra Babu	INC	P. Rambhupal Reddy
Anantapur	155	Raptadu	YSRCP	Thopudurthi Prakash Reddy	TDP	Paritala Sunitha	INC	Adi Andhra Sankaraiah
Sri Sathya Sai	156	Madakasira (SC)	YSRCP	Eera Lakkappa	TDP	M. S. Raju	INC	Karikera Sudhakar
Sri Sathya Sai	157	Hindupur	YSRCP	T. N. Deepika	TDP	Nandamuri Balakrishna	INC	Mohammad Hussain Inayathulla
Sri Sathya Sai	158	Penukonda	YSRCP	K. V. Ushashri Charan	TDP	S. Savitha	INC	P. Narasimhappa
Sri Sathya Sai	159	Puttaparthi	YSRCP	Duddukunta Sreedhar Reddy	TDP	Palle Sindhura Reddy	INC	Madhusudhan Reddy
Sri Sathya Sai	160	Dharmavaram	YSRCP	Kethireddy Venkatarami Reddy	BJP	Y. Satya Kumar Yadav	INC	Rangana Aswardha Narayana
Sri Sathya Sai	161	Kadiri	YSRCP	B. S. Maqbool Ahmed	TDP	Kandikunta Venkata Prasad	INC	K. S. Shanwaz
Annamayya	162	Thamballapalle	YSRCP	Peddireddy Dwarakanatha Reddy	TDP	Jaya Chandra Reddy	INC	M. N. Chandrasekhar Reddy
Annamayya	163	Pileru	YSRCP	Chintala Ramachandra Reddy	TDP	Nallari Kishore Kumar Reddy	INC	B. Somasekhar Reddy
Annamayya	164	Madanapalle	YSRCP	Nissar Ahmed	TDP	Mohammed Shahjahan Basha	INC	Pawan Kumar Reddy
Chittoor	165	Punganur	YSRCP	Peddireddy Ramachandra Reddy	TDP	Challa Ramachandra Reddy	INC	G. Murali Mohan Yadav
Tirupati	166	Chandragiri	YSRCP	Chevireddy Mohith Reddy	TDP	Pulivarthi Nani	INC	Kanuparthy Srinivasulu
Tirupati	167	Tirupati	YSRCP	Bhumana Abhinay Reddy	JSP	Arani Srinivasulu	CPI	P. Murali
Tirupati	168	Srikalahasti	YSRCP	Biyyapu Madhusudhan Reddy	TDP	Bojjala Sudhir Reddy	INC	Pothugunta Rajesh Naidu
Tirupati	169	Sathyavedu (SC)	YSRCP	Nukatoti Rajesh	TDP	Koneti Adimulam	INC	Balaguruvam Babu
Chittoor	170	Nagari	YSRCP	R. K. Roja	TDP	Gali Bhanu Prakash	INC	Pochareddy Rakesh Reddy
Chittoor	171	Gangadhara Nellore (SC)	YSRCP	Kalattur Krupa Lakshmi	TDP	V. M. Thomas	INC	Deyala Ramesh Babu
Chittoor	172	Chittoor	YSRCP	M. Vijayananda Reddy	TDP	Gurajala Jagan Mohan	INC	G. Tikaram
Chittoor	173	Puthalapattu (SC)	YSRCP	M. Sunil Kumar	TDP	Kalikiri Murali Mohan	INC	M. S. Babu
Chittoor	174	Palamaner	YSRCP	N. Venkate Gowda	TDP	N. Amarnath Reddy	INC	B. Siva Sankar
Chittoor	175	Kuppam	YSRCP	K. R. J. Bharath	TDP	N. Chandrababu Naidu	INC	Avula Govindarajulu

== Election issues ==
In the lead-up to the election, several issues had come to light, including demands for special category status, the capital issue and unemployment in the state. Incidents such as Y. S. Vivekananda Reddy's murder, the attack on Y. S. Jagan Mohan Reddy and legal cases against N. Chandrababu Naidu had also gathered significant attention. Despite facing anti-incumbency, the YSR Congress relied on its welfare schemes, particularly in rural and tribal areas. Meanwhile, the NDA focused on concerns such as inflation, unemployment, and broader development, gaining support in urban areas.

=== State capital ===
During the previous five-year tenure of the TDP-BJP government, Amaravati was proposed as the capital for the state of Andhra Pradesh. However, this plan was later scrapped by the successive YSRCP government, which aimed to establish three capitals namely Visakhapatnam, Amaravati and Kurnool as executive, legislative and judiciary purposes respectively, as part of a decentralisation initiative which faced legal hurdles and failed to be implemented. While farmers in the Amaravati region opposed this decision, the TDP-JSP-BJP alliance vowed to reinstate Amaravati as the capital. On the contrary Chief Minister Y. S. Jagan Mohan Reddy launched Vision Visakha, reaffirming the establishment of Visakhapatnam as the administrative or executive capital.

=== Alcohol prices and quality ===
In the previous 2019 election, the YSRCP made a promise to completely ban alcohol in the state. However, it was not fulfilled and instead, prices were increased with the aim of reducing consumption. The TDP-JSP alliance, along with the BJP alleged that this led to what they termed as the nation's largest liquor scam, with significant financial and health implications for consumers, including the risk of liver diseases. The Alliance has pledged to provide good-quality alcohol at reduced prices, claiming that distilleries and breweries are controlled by members and associates of the ruling party, including those producing local brands with poor-quality. The Alliance leaders also alleged that despite the nationwide shift towards digital transactions, liquor retail outlets in the state have continued to accept cash payments exceeding the Maximum Retail Price (MRP), thereby generating profits for leaders of the ruling party.

=== Illegal sand mining ===
The joint committee formed by the Ministry of Environment, Forest and Climate Change, submitted a report to the National Green Tribunal on 21 March 2024, revealing ongoing 24-hour illegal sand mining in the inspected regions of Krishna and Guntur districts without valid environmental clearances. The committee was formed in response to petitions alleging illegal sand mining in the state. Additionally, the committee noted that the state government failed to provide information and documents requested from the Department of Mines and Geology regarding district-wise sand reaches allotted, permitted quantities, and violations. Opposition parties have accused ruling party leaders of illegally transporting thousands of lorries of sand daily, with no action taken despite numerous complaints lodged by opposition leaders and local residents.

=== Naidu's arrest ===
TDP supremo N. Chandrababu Naidu was arrested on 9 September 2023 in an alleged multi-crore skill development scam. The arrest became an election issue in Telangana, which was then soon to enter state polls, with different political parties in the state rushing to support Naidu to woo Andhra settlers. Naidu's son Nara Lokesh said that Naidu's arrest was unfair and alleged that Prime Minister Narendra Modi did the same with firms in Gujarat while he was the state chief minister there.

=== Land Titling Act ===
The Land Titling Act of Andhra Pradesh had become a major issue in the elections, leading to counterclaims and allegations between political parties in the state. The act was brought by the Y. S. Jagan Mohan Reddy government, aiming to streamline land records, settle disputes and provide permanent titles. Both the Telugu Desam Party and Jana Sena Party have termed it as the Land Grabbing Act. The main opposition party, TDP chief N. Chandrababu Naidu, alleged that the act was designed to take away lands and promised to revoke it if they come to power. He also questioned Chief Minister Jagan for printing his image on the passbook instead of the official emblem of the state. The YSRCP alleged that the TDP is spreading misinformation about the Land Titling Act due to losing confidence in their manifesto. Furthermore, the state government countered the TDP's claims by stating that the centre has encouraged state governments to enact their own legislation based on drafts proposed by NITI Aayog to suit their requirements. While the BJP, part of the NDA alliance said that the centre has no authority to enact the land related legislations. The opposition parties within the NDA alliance claimed that this act is in contravention of the laws related to property transfer, evidence, succession and various judicial proceedings, citing violations of property laws and Article 300-A, along with concerns about Title Registration Officers.

== Campaigns ==
2024 Election – Street campaign through song and dance by NDA in Guntur, Andhra Pradesh

Candidates campaigned by interacting with common people and participating in their daily activities such as making tea, ironing clothes and weighing vegetables. The primary parties in the state used movies and songs to promote their own political party while denigrating other party leaders. The use of social media to amplify the reach of such content to voters became a core strategy for parties.

=== YSR Congress Party ===
The YSRCP launched its Why AP needs Jagan campaign on 9 November 2023. The outreach campaign lasted for 40 days. Bus yatras were taken out in all 175 assembly constituencies during the campaign. The campaign was criticised by the opposition TDP, which countered it with the slogan Why AP hates Jagan.

Chief Minister Jagan Mohan Reddy announced a mass contact program called Siddham (We are Ready!) for the election campaign, which was countered by the slogans Samsiddham (We are Prepared!) and Memu Siddhame (We are also Ready!) from the TDP and JSP respectively. The YSRCP took up the slogans Maa Nammakam Nuvve Jagan (Jagan is our belief) and Jagananne Maa Bhavishyattu (Jagan is our future) to reach the public in the election. The party announced candidates for all 175 seats in the general election through multiple lists.

=== Kutami ===
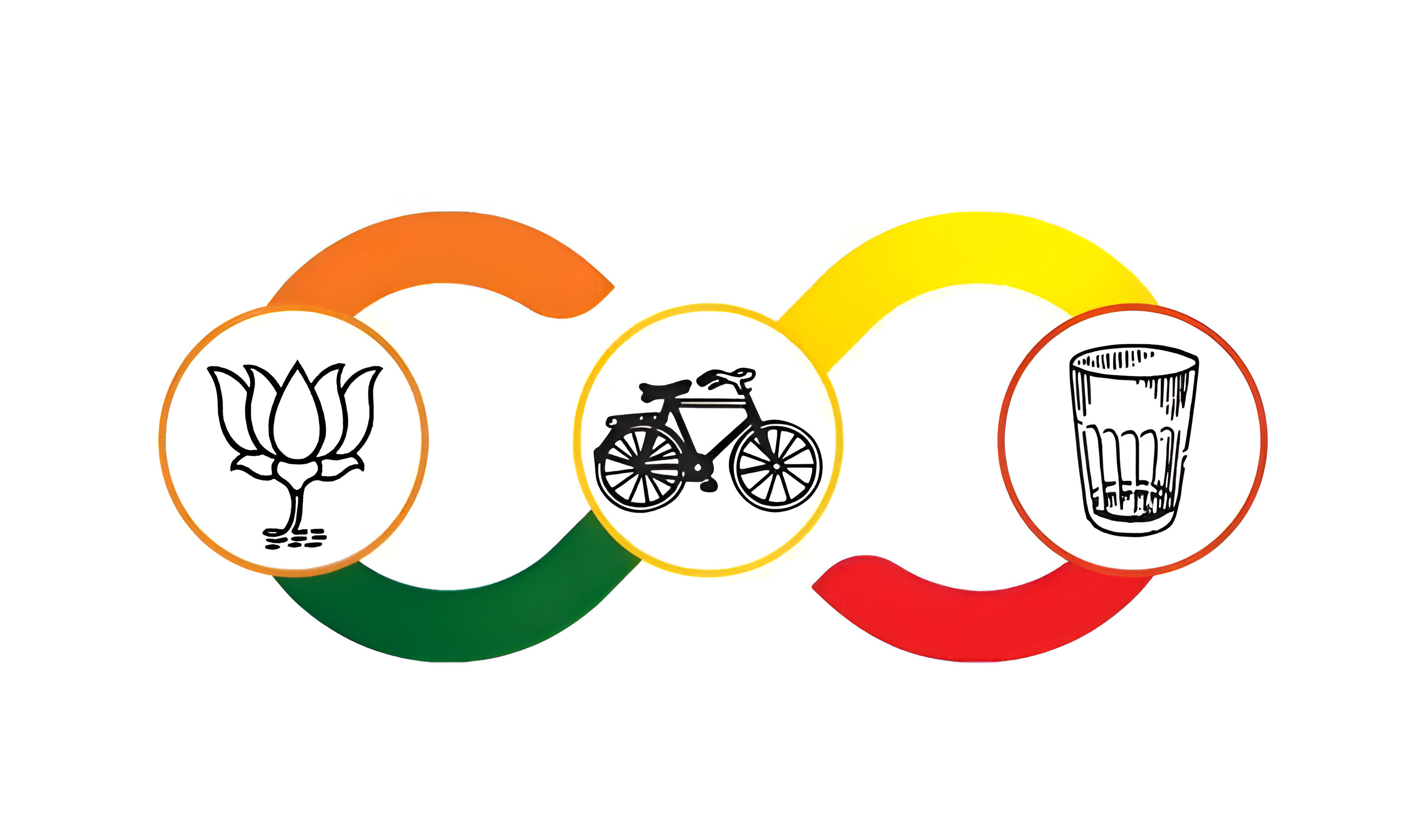
Logo of the alliance, Kutami

After huge speculation about an alliance between the TDP and Janasena Party (JSP), JSP chief Pawan Kalyan officially announced the tie of both parties in the 2024 polls on 14 September 2023 amidst the arrest of N. Chandrababu Naidu to collectively fight against the incumbent YSRCP. A joint action committee was set up, comprising representatives from both parties.

The first meeting of the committee was held in Rajahmundry on 21 October 2023, addressing public issues, the latest political developments and steps for better coordination between the two parties. Both the TDP and JSP chiefs met on multiple occasions to discuss seat sharing, a common manifesto and other political developments in the state.

On 20 December 2023, to mark the completion of the Nara Lokesh Yuva Galam Padayatra, the TDP and JSP held a joint public meeting called Yuva Galam Navasakam in Polipalli, Vizianagaram district, accommodating around 6 lakh people with Pawan Kalyan attending the meeting.

The initial joint list of the TDP-JSP alliance, comprising a total of 118 seats, was formally released by both party chiefs on 24 February 2024. Of these, 24 seats were allotted to the JSP, with 5 candidates named and 94 seats to the TDP. On 28 February 2024, both parties held a joint public meeting called Jenda in Tadepalligudem, West Godavari district, describing it as a historic necessity to defeat the incumbent YSRCP. They emphasized the importance of saving democracy and promoting the development of Andhra Pradesh, urging party cadres to understand the ground reality.

On 9 March 2024, the president of the Bharatiya Janata Party, J. P. Nadda issued a joint official statement on behalf of the BJP, TDP and JSP. The statement announced the admission of the TDP to the NDA and finalised the alliance of the BJP, TDP and JSP for the upcoming legislative assembly and Lok Sabha polls in Andhra Pradesh.

The alliance members agreed to contest all 175 seats with TDP in 144, JSP in 21 and BJP in 10. The alliance finalised the candidates through multiple lists.

==== Telugu Desam Party ====
The TDP organised various public outreach programs such as Badude Badudu, Isuka Satyagraha Deekshalu and Jaiho BC to engage with the public and campaign against the YSRCP. The TDP general secretary Nara Lokesh also launched the Yuva Galam Padayatra, a walkathon to reach the public.

==== Janasena Party ====
Earlier to the official formation of the alliance with the TDP, the JSP chief, Pawan Kalyan launched a Varahi Yatra on 14 June 2023 from Annavaram with a specially designed vehicle named as Varahi to campaign against the YSRCP. The campaign was conducted in multiple phases to reach the public widely.

=== Indian National Congress ===
The Indian National Congress (INC) launched its campaign Intinti Congress via a statewide door-to-door campaign on 20 January 2024. The recent successes of the party in the bordering states of Karnataka and Telangana enthused the party cadre ahead of the election. Chief Minister Jagan Reddy's sister Y. S. Sharmila, joined the INC on 4 January 2024 and lead its campaign for the election.

On 22 February 2024, APCC president Y. S. Sharmila and other 40 Congress workers were temporarily detained for protesting against the DSC notification for teacher recruitment. Sharmila herself had reportedly spent the previous night in the party office to avoid house arrest.

On 26 February 2024, at Anantapur, Sharmila and Congress president Mallikarjun Kharge announced a guarantee of ₹5,000 per month to every poor family if the party comes to power. At the meeting, Kharge criticised prime minister Narendra Modi for not according Special Category Status (SCS) to Andhra Pradesh. He also said that the TDP, JSP and the YSRCP were all stooges of the BJP. On 1 March, Congress general secretary Sachin Pilot said at a public meeting in Tirupati that the Congress would accord 10-year SCS to Andhra Pradesh immediately if it came to power at the centre.

== Manifestos ==
=== YSR Congress Party ===
On 21 April 2024, the party's chief and the chief minister, Y. S. Jagan Mohan Reddy, unveiled the party's manifesto at his camp office in Tadepalle, promising to continue existing welfare schemes for the next five years if voted to power.

=== Kutami ===
On 30 April 2024, both N. Chandrababu Naidu, the chief of Telugu Desam Party and Pawan Kalyan, the chief of Jana Sena Party, unveiled a joint manifesto at Undavalli, promising to create employment opportunities and implementation of other welfare schemes. The BJP, another alliance partner endorsed the TDP-JSP joint manifesto without adding any further assurances as it had already released its own manifesto previously titled "Modi Ki Guarantee".

=== Indian National Congress ===
The Indian National Congress had released their manifesto titled "Nyay Patra" previously for the general election in March 2024.

== Incidents ==
=== Electoral malpractices ===
Telugu Desam Party (TDP) chief N. Chandrababu Naidu accused the ruling YSR Congress Party (YSRCP) of subverting electoral practices. Subsequently, on 28 August 2023, he lodged a complaint with the Election Commission of India to ensure all the eligible voters are included and fake voters are removed. He also demanded an enquiry into the transfer of the electoral data to the private agencies and prevent the appointment of grama volunteers instead of teachers for the election duty. He also submitted a documentary evidence of the deletion of 40,000 votes in Visakhapatnam East, 23,000 votes in Vijayawada Central and also at Parchur, Tadikonda and Uravakonda constituencies.

=== Stone pelting ===
On 13 April 2024, a stone was thrown at Chief Minister Y. S. Jagan Mohan Reddy by an unidentified person while he was campaigning on top of a bus in Vijayawada. The stone narrowly hit the left temple of his eye, avoiding any major injuries and causing a minor cut. While the YSRCP alleged that it was a pre-planned conspiracy to attack their leader, the opposition leader, N. Chandrababu Naidu condemned the act and requested an impartial inquiry by the Election Commission into the incident. Furthermore, the TDP questioned the circumstances and timing of the incident, alleging that it was staged and similar to the knife attack on Jagan weeks before the 2019 Andhra Pradesh Legislative Assembly election, aimed at garnering sympathy for winning the election. Power was switched off during the incident by authorities to prevent Jagan and others standing on top of the vehicle from coming into contact with live wires and overhanging cables. Various politicians, including Prime Minister Narendra Modi condemned the attack.

== Election day ==
The election concluded with a high voter turnout of 81.86%. Darsi recorded the highest turnout at 90.91%, while Tirupati had the lowest at 63.32%. Post-election violence erupted between members of the ruling YSRCP and the main opposition TDP in few districts, particularly in Palnadu, Anantapur and Tirupati. The clashes involved stick fights, stone-throwing, involving the use of petrol bombs along with crude weapons such as sickles, axes and hammers. This led to injuries, burning of vehicles and damage to party offices and houses. The violence caused widespread fear and forced businesses to close. In response, the Election Commission of India has deployed Special Investigation Teams to the affected regions for further investigation and has suspended 12 Subordinate Police officers.

YSRCP MLA, Annabathuni Siva Kumar hit a voter standing in a queue after the voter objected to the MLA for jumping the queue. The voter retaliated by hitting him back, after which the MLA's supporters also attacked the voter. Another YSRCP MLA, Pinnelli Ramakrishna Reddy, stormed into a polling booth with his supporters and destroyed the EVM and VVPAT machines by hitting them to the ground in Macherla.

== Surveys and polls ==
=== Exit polls ===
The ECI banned exit polls from 19 April 2024 to 1 June 2024. The ban ended after the close of Phase 7 voting at 18:30 IST on 1 June 2024.

Polling agency				Lead	Ref.
Polling agency	YSRCP	Kutami	INDIA	Lead	Ref.
KK Surveys and Strategies	14	161	0	Kutami	
RISE	58	115	1	Kutami	
People's Pulse	45–60	111–135	0	Kutami	
India Today–Axis My India	55–77	98–120	0–2	Kutami	
AARA	94–104	71–81	0	YSRCP	
Times Now–ETG	117–125	50–58	0	YSRCP	

== Results ==
The results of the election were announced on 4 June 2024. The Kutami achieved a sweeping victory securing a total of 164 seats. The TDP won 135 out of the 144 seats it contested, JSP secured all 21 seats it contested and the BJP won 8 out of its 10 contested seats. The incumbent YSRCP faced severe anti-incumbency and managed to win only 11 out of the 175 seats it contested. This result marked the worst defeat in Andhra Pradesh's electoral history, with the YSRCP unable to even secure the position of the opposition in the state. The Kutami swept all districts except for the Alluri Sitharama Raju, causing the YSRCP to lose many of its previously considered strongholds. The INDIA alliance failed to win any seats in the election.

164	11
Kutami	YSRCP

=== Vote share ===
Vote share by party
1. Telugu Desam Party (45.6%)
2. YSR Congress Party (39.4%)
3. Janasena Party (6.87%)
4. Bharatiya Janata Party (2.83%)
5. Others (5.32%)

=== Seat share ===
Seat share by party
1. Telugu Desam Party (77.1%)
2. Janasena Party (12.0%)
3. YSR Congress Party (6.29%)
4. Bharatiya Janata Party (4.57%)

=== Results by party ===
Alliance/Party		Popular vote			Seats		
Alliance/Party		Votes	%	±pp	Contested	Won	+/−
Kutami	Telugu Desam Party	15,384,576	45.60	▲6.43	144	135	▲112
Kutami	Janasena Party	2,317,747	6.87	▲1.34	21	21	▲20
Kutami	Bharatiya Janata Party	953,977	2.83	▲1.99	10	8	▲8
Kutami	Total	18,656,300	55.30	N/A	175	164	N/A
YSR Congress Party		13,284,134	39.38	▼10.57	175	11	▼140
INDIA	Indian National Congress	580,613	1.72	▲0.55	158	0	Steady
INDIA	Communist Party of India (Marxist)	43,012	0.13	▼0.19	8	0	Steady
INDIA	Communist Party of India	12,832	0.04	▼0.07	8	0	Steady
INDIA	Total	636,457	1.89	N/A	175	0	N/A
Other parties		427,218	1.26	N/A	877	0	N/A
Independents		367,141	1.09	▲0.18	985	0	Steady
NOTA		365,667	1.08	▼0.20			
Total		33,736,917	100.00	N/A	2,387	175	N/A
Vote statistics
Valid votes							
Invalid votes							
Votes cast/Turnout		33,838,349	81.87				
Abstentions		7,495,353	18.13				
Registered voters		41,333,702					

=== Results by region ===
Region	Seats		
Region	Seats	Kutami	YSRCP
North Coastal Andhra (Note: Includes Alluri Sitharama Raju, Anakapalli, Parvathipuram Manyam, Srikakulam, Visakhapatnam and Vizianagaram districts)	35	33	2
Godavari (Note: Includes Konaseema, East Godavari, Eluru, Kakinada and West Godavari districts)	35	35	—N/a
Amaravati–APCR (Note: Includes Bapatla, Guntur, Krishna, NTR and Palnadu districts)	34	34	—N/a
South Coastal Andhra (Note: Includes Prakasam, Nellore and Tirupati districts)	23	21	2
Rayalaseema (Note: Includes Ananthapuramu, Annamayya, Chittoor, Kadapa, Kurnool, Nandyal and Sri Sathya Sai districts)	48	41	7
Total	175	164	11

=== Results by district ===
District	Seats		
District	Seats	Kutami	YSRCP
Srikakulam	8	8	—N/a
Vizianagaram	7	7	—N/a
Parvathipuram Manyam	4	4	—N/a
Visakhapatnam	6	6	—N/a
Anakapalli	7	7	—N/a
Alluri Sitharama Raju	3	1	2
Kakinada	7	7	—N/a
East Godavari	7	7	—N/a
Konaseema	7	7	—N/a
West Godavari	7	7	—N/a
Eluru	7	7	—N/a
NTR	7	7	—N/a
Krishna	7	7	—N/a
Guntur	7	7	—N/a
Palnadu	7	7	—N/a
Bapatla	6	6	—N/a
Prakasam	8	6	2
Nellore	8	8	—N/a
Tirupati	7	7	—N/a
Chittoor	7	6	1
Annamayya	6	4	2
YSR Kadapa	7	5	2
Nandyal	7	7	—N/a
Kurnool	7	5	2
Ananthapuramu	8	8	—N/a
Sri Sathya Sai	6	6	—N/a
Total	175	164	11

=== Results by constituency ===
District	Constituency		Winner				Runner-up				Margin
District	No.	Name	Candidate	Party	Votes	%	Candidate	Party	Votes	%	Margin
Srikakulam	1	Ichchapuram	Bendalam Ashok	TDP	110,612	58.58	Piriya Vijaya	YSRCP	70,829	37.51	39,783
Srikakulam	2	Palasa	Gouthu Sireesha	TDP	101,560	60.44	Seediri Appalaraju	YSRCP	61,210	36.43	40,350
Srikakulam	3	Tekkali	Kinjarapu Atchannaidu	TDP	107,923	55.71	Duvvada Srinivas	YSRCP	73,488	37.94	34,435
Srikakulam	4	Pathapatnam	Mamidi Govinda Rao	TDP	89,452	54.76	Reddy Shanthi	YSRCP	62,925	38.52	26,527
Srikakulam	5	Srikakulam	Gondu Shankar	TDP	117,091	60.93	Dharmana Prasada Rao	YSRCP	64,570	33.60	52,521
Srikakulam	6	Amadalavalasa	Koona Ravi Kumar	TDP	88,003	55.45	Thammineni Seetharam	YSRCP	52,971	33.38	35,032
Srikakulam	7	Etcherla	Nadukuditi Eswara Rao	BJP	112,770	54.59	Gorle Kiran Kumar	YSRCP	83,681	40.51	29,089
Srikakulam	8	Narasannapeta	Baggu Ramanamurthy	TDP	99,951	56.35	Dharmana Krishna Das	YSRCP	70,580	39.79	29,371
Vizianagaram	9	Rajam (SC)	Kondru Murali Mohan	TDP	94,385	53.48	Tale Rajesh	YSRCP	73,663	41.74	20,722
Parvathipuram Manyam	10	Palakonda (ST)	Nimmaka Jaya Krishna	JSP	75,208	50.69	Viswasarayi Kalavathi	YSRCP	61,917	41.73	13,291
Parvathipuram Manyam	11	Kurupam (ST)	Thoyaka Jagadeeswari	TDP	83,355	53.68	Pamula Pushpa Sreevani	YSRCP	59,855	38.54	23,500
Parvathipuram Manyam	12	Parvathipuram (SC)	Bonela Vijaya Chandra	TDP	83,905	55.33	Alajangi Jogarao	YSRCP	59,491	39.23	24,414
Parvathipuram Manyam	13	Salur (ST)	Gummidi Sandhyarani	TDP	80,211	50.65	Peedika Rajanna Dora	YSRCP	66,478	41.98	13,733
Vizianagaram	14	Bobbili	Baby Nayana	TDP	112,366	59.45	S. V. China Appala Naidu	YSRCP	67,718	35.83	44,648
Vizianagaram	15	Cheepurupalli	Kimidi Kalavenkata Rao	TDP	88,225	50.98	Botcha Satyanarayana	YSRCP	76,254	44.06	11,971
Vizianagaram	16	Gajapathinagaram	Kondapalli Srinivas	TDP	98,051	54.99	Botcha Appalanarasayya	YSRCP	72,750	40.80	25,301
Vizianagaram	17	Nellimarla	Lokam Naga Madhavi	JSP	109,915	57.75	Baddukonda Appala Naidu	YSRCP	70,086	36.38	39,829
Vizianagaram	18	Vizianagaram	Pusapati Aditi Vijayalakshmi	TDP	121,241	64.21	Kolagatla Veerabhadra Swamy	YSRCP	60,632	32.11	60,609
Vizianagaram	19	Srungavarapukota	Kolla Lalitha Kumari	TDP	111,026	58.36	Kadubandi Srinivasa Rao	YSRCP	72,236	37.97	38,790
Visakhapatnam	20	Bhimili	Ganta Srinivasa Rao	TDP	176,230	63.34	Muttamsetti Srinivasa Rao	YSRCP	83,829	30.13	92,401
Visakhapatnam	21	Visakhapatnam East	Velagapudi Ramakrishna Babu	TDP	132,047	64.89	M. V. V. Satyanarayana	YSRCP	61,170	30.06	70,877
Visakhapatnam	22	Visakhapatnam South	Vamsi Krishna Srinivasa Yadav	JSP	97,868	70.23	Vasupalli Ganesh Kumar	YSRCP	33,274	23.87	64,594
Visakhapatnam	23	Visakhapatnam North	Penmetsa Vishnu Kumar Raju	BJP	108,801	57.81	Kammila Kannaparaju	YSRCP	61,267	32.55	47,534
Visakhapatnam	24	Visakhapatnam West	P. G. V. R. Naidu	TDP	90,805	60.13	Adari Anand Kumar	YSRCP	55,621	36.83	35,184
Visakhapatnam	25	Gajuwaka	Palla Srinivas Rao Yadav	TDP	157,703	67.30	Gudivada Amarnath	YSRCP	62,468	26.66	95,235
Anakapalli	26	Chodavaram	K. S. N. Sanyasi Raju	TDP	109,651	59.03	Karanam Dharmasri	YSRCP	67,462	36.32	42,189
Anakapalli	27	Madugula	Bandaru Satyanarayana Murthy	TDP	91,869	55.60	Eerli Anuradha	YSRCP	63,843	38.64	28,026
Alluri Sitharama Raju	28	Araku Valley (ST)	Regam Matyalingam	YSRCP	65,658	36.71	Pangi Rajarao	BJP	33,781	18.89	31,877
Alluri Sitharama Raju	29	Paderu (ST)	Matsyarasa Visweswara Raju	YSRCP	68,170	42.30	Giddi Eswari	TDP	48,832	30.30	19,338
Anakapalli	30	Anakapalle	Konathala Ramakrishna	JSP	115,126	66.63	Malasala Bharath Kumar	YSRCP	49,362	28.57	65,764
Visakhapatnam	31	Pendurthi	Panchakarla Ramesh Babu	JSP	149,611	65.01	Annamreddy Adeep Raj	YSRCP	67,741	29.43	81,870
Anakapalli	32	Elamanchili	Sundarapu Vijay Kumar	JSP	109,443	61.00	Kanna Babu	YSRCP	60,487	33.71	48,956
Anakapalli	33	Payakaraopet (SC)	Vangalapudi Anitha	TDP	120,042	57.86	Kambala Jogulu	YSRCP	76,315	36.78	43,727
Anakapalli	34	Narsipatnam	Chintakayala Ayyanna Patrudu	TDP	99,849	54.60	Uma Shankar Ganesh	YSRCP	75,173	41.11	24,676
Kakinada	35	Tuni	Yanamala Divya	TDP	97,206	51.31	Dadisetty Raja	YSRCP	82,029	43.30	15,177
Kakinada	36	Prathipadu (Kakinada)	Varupula Satya Prabha	TDP	103,002	58.36	Varupula Subbarao	YSRCP	64,234	36.40	38,768
Kakinada	37	Pithapuram	Pawan Kalyan	JSP	134,394	64.87	Vanga Geetha	YSRCP	64,115	30.95	70,279
Kakinada	38	Kakinada Rural	Pantham Venkateswara Rao	JSP	134,414	65.11	Kurasala Kannababu	YSRCP	62,374	30.21	72,040
Kakinada	39	Peddapuram	Nimmakayala Chinarajappa	TDP	105,685	59.09	Davuluru Dora Babu	YSRCP	65,234	36.47	40,451
East Godavari	40	Anaparthy	Nallamilli Ramakrishna Reddy	BJP	105,720	53.73	Sathi Suryanarayana Reddy	YSRCP	84,870	43.14	20,850
Kakinada	41	Kakinada City	Vanamadi Venkateswara Rao	TDP	113,014	63.78	Dwarampudi Chandrasekhar Reddy	YSRCP	56,442	31.86	56,572
Konaseema	42	Ramachandrapuram	Vasamsetti Subhash	TDP	97,652	55.68	Pilli Surya Prakash	YSRCP	71,361	40.69	26,291
Konaseema	43	Mummidivaram	Datla Subbaraju	TDP	118,687	57.25	Ponnada Venkata Satish Kumar	YSRCP	79,951	38.56	38,736
Konaseema	44	Amalapuram (SC)	Aithabathula Anandarao	TDP	104,022	58.56	Pinipe Viswarup	YSRCP	65,394	36.81	38,628
Konaseema	45	Razole (SC)	Deva Varaprasad	JSP	95,514	60.13	Gollapalli Surya Rao	YSRCP	56,503	35.57	39,011
Konaseema	46	Gannavaram (SC)	Giddi Satyanarayana	JSP	96,108	57.14	Vipparthi Venugopal Rao	YSRCP	62,741	37.30	33,367
Konaseema	47	Kothapeta	Bandaru Satyananda Rao	TDP	134,286	61.70	Chirla Jaggi Reddy	YSRCP	77,807	35.75	56,479
Konaseema	48	Mandapeta	V. Jogeswara Rao	TDP	116,309	59.94	Thota Trimurthulu	YSRCP	71,874	37.04	44,435
East Godavari	49	Rajanagaram	Bathula Balaramakrishna	JSP	105,995	55.51	Jakkampudi Raja	YSRCP	71,946	37.68	34,049
East Godavari	50	Rajahmundry City	Adireddy Srinivas	TDP	123,291	67.69	Margani Bharat	YSRCP	51,887	28.49	71,404
East Godavari	51	Rajahmundry Rural	Gorantla Butchaiah Chowdary	TDP	129,060	63.87	C. S. Venugopala Krishna	YSRCP	64,970	32.15	64,090
Kakinada	52	Jaggampeta	Jyothula Nehru	TDP	113,593	58.56	Thota Narasimham	YSRCP	60,917	31.40	52,676
Alluri Sitharama Raju	53	Rampachodavaram (ST)	Miryala Sirisha Devi	TDP	90,087	42.80	Nagulapalli Dhanalakshmi	YSRCP	80,948	38.45	9,139
East Godavari	54	Kovvur (SC)	Muppidi Venkateswara Rao	TDP	92,743	58.29	Talari Venkat Rao	YSRCP	58,797	36.95	33,946
East Godavari	55	Nidadavole	Kandula Durgesh	JSP	102,699	56.27	Geddam Srinivas Naidu	YSRCP	69,395	38.02	33,304
West Godavari	56	Achanta	Pithani Satyanarayana	TDP	85,402	56.73	C. Sri Ranganadha Raju	YSRCP	58,848	39.09	26,554
West Godavari	57	Palakollu	Nimmala Ramanaidu	TDP	111,471	69.30	Gudala Sri Hari Gopala Rao	YSRCP	44,590	27.67	66,881
West Godavari	58	Narasapuram	Bommidi Narayana Nayakar	JSP	94,116	64.72	Mudunuri Prasad Raju	YSRCP	44,378	30.52	49,738
West Godavari	59	Bhimavaram	Pulaparthi Ramanjaneyulu	JSP	130,424	63.94	Grandhi Srinivas	YSRCP	63,450	31.11	66,974
West Godavari	60	Undi	Raghu Rama Krishna Raju	TDP	116,902	59.80	P. V. L. Narasimha Raju	YSRCP	60,125	30.76	56,777
West Godavari	61	Tanuku	Arimilli Radha Krishna	TDP	129,547	66.51	Karumuri Venkata Nageswara Rao	YSRCP	57,426	29.48	72,121
West Godavari	62	Tadepalligudem	Bolisetti Srinivas	JSP	116,443	65.40	Kottu Satyanarayana	YSRCP	53,951	30.30	62,492
Eluru	63	Unguturu	Patsamatla Dharmaraju	JSP	108,894	59.63	Puppala Srinivasa Rao	YSRCP	63,949	35.02	44,945
Eluru	64	Denduluru	Chintamaneni Prabhakar	TDP	107,287	55.11	Kotaru Abbaya Chowdary	YSRCP	81,021	41.62	26,266
Eluru	65	Eluru	Badeti Chanti	TDP	111,562	67.09	Alla Nani	YSRCP	49,174	29.57	62,388
East Godavari	66	Gopalapuram (SC)	Maddipati Venkata Raju	TDP	114,420	54.06	Taneti Vanitha	YSRCP	87,636	41.40	26,784
Eluru	67	Polavaram (ST)	Chirri Balaraju	JSP	101,453	46.33	Tellam Rajyalakshmi	YSRCP	93,518	42.70	7,935
Eluru	68	Chintalapudi (SC)	Songa Roshan Kumar	TDP	120,126	53.30	Kambham Vijayaraju	YSRCP	92,360	40.98	27,766
NTR	69	Tiruvuru (SC)	Kolikapudi Srinivasa Rao	TDP	100,719	54.91	Nallagatla Swamy Das	YSRCP	78,845	42.99	21,874
Eluru	70	Nuzvid	Kolusu Parthasarathy	TDP	108,229	51.12	Meka Venkata Pratap Apparao	YSRCP	95,851	45.27	12,378
Krishna	71	Gannavaram (Krishna)	Yarlagadda Venkata Rao	TDP	135,552	56.59	Vallabhaneni Vamsi Mohan	YSRCP	97,924	40.88	37,628
Krishna	72	Gudivada	Venigandla Ramu	TDP	109,980	64.09	Kodali Nani	YSRCP	56,940	33.18	53,040
Eluru	73	Kaikalur	Kamineni Srinivas	BJP	109,280	60.38	Dulam Nageswara Rao	YSRCP	64,007	35.36	45,273
Krishna	74	Pedana	Kagitha Krishna Prasad	TDP	91,394	60.95	Uppala Ramu	YSRCP	53,271	35.52	38,123
Krishna	75	Machilipatnam	Kollu Ravindra	TDP	105,044	63.73	Perni Krishnamurthy	YSRCP	54,802	33.25	50,242
Krishna	76	Avanigadda	Mandali Buddha Prasad	JSP	113,460	60.85	Simhadri Ramesh Babu	YSRCP	67,026	35.95	46,434
Krishna	77	Pamarru (SC)	Varla Kumar Raja	TDP	94,189	57.13	Kaile Anil Kumar	YSRCP	64,499	39.12	29,690
Krishna	78	Penamaluru	Bode Prasad	TDP	144,912	61.26	Jogi Ramesh	YSRCP	84,997	35.93	59,915
NTR	79	Vijayawada West	Sujana Chowdary	BJP	105,669	61.49	Shaik Asif	YSRCP	58,637	34.12	47,032
NTR	80	Vijayawada Central	Bonda Umamaheswara Rao	TDP	130,034	63.52	Vellampalli Srinivas	YSRCP	61,148	29.87	68,886
NTR	81	Vijayawada East	Gadde Rama Mohan	TDP	118,841	60.66	Devineni Avinash	YSRCP	69,201	35.32	49,640
NTR	82	Mylavaram	Vasantha Krishna Prasad	TDP	137,338	56.61	Sarnala Tirupathi Rao Yadav	YSRCP	94,509	38.96	42,829
NTR	83	Nandigama (SC)	Tangirala Sowmya	TDP	102,201	56.16	Monditoka Jagan Mohana Rao	YSRCP	74,806	41.10	27,395
NTR	84	Jaggayyapeta	Rajagopal Sreeram (Tataiah)	TDP	98,479	52.98	Samineni Udaya Bhanu	YSRCP	82,502	44.38	15,977
Palnadu	85	Pedakurapadu	Bhashyam Praveen	TDP	112,957	53.97	Namburu Sankar Rao	YSRCP	91,868	43.89	21,089
Guntur	86	Tadikonda (SC)	Tenali Sravan Kumar	TDP	109,585	59.52	Mekathoti Sucharitha	YSRCP	69,979	38.01	39,606
Guntur	87	Mangalagiri	Nara Lokesh	TDP	167,710	66.07	Murugudu Lavanya	YSRCP	76,297	30.06	91,413
Guntur	88	Ponnuru	Dhulipalla Narendra Kumar	TDP	110,410	56.95	Ambati Murali	YSRCP	77,495	39.97	32,915
Bapatla	89	Vemuru (SC)	Nakka Ananda Babu	TDP	94,922	54.92	Varikuti Ashok Babu	YSRCP	72,901	42.18	22,021
Bapatla	90	Repalle	Anagani Satya Prasad	TDP	111,129	58.85	Evuru Ganesh	YSRCP	71,182	37.70	39,947
Guntur	91	Tenali	Nadendla Manohar	JSP	123,961	60.18	Annabathuni Siva Kumar	YSRCP	75,849	36.82	48,112
Bapatla	92	Bapatla	V. Narendra Varma Raju	TDP	90,626	56.21	Kona Raghupathi	YSRCP	62,858	38.99	27,768
Guntur	93	Prathipadu (Guntur) (SC)	Burla Ramanjaneyulu	TDP	128,665	58.09	Balasani Kiran Kumar	YSRCP	86,650	39.12	42,015
Guntur	94	Guntur West	Galla Madhavi	TDP	116,067	61.58	Vidadala Rajini	YSRCP	64,917	34.44	51,150
Guntur	95	Guntur East	Mohammed Naseer Ahmed	TDP	100,815	56.17	Shaik Noori Fathima	YSRCP	68,853	38.36	31,962
Palnadu	96	Chilakaluripet	Prathipati Pulla Rao	TDP	111,062	56.84	K. Manohar Naidu	YSRCP	77,800	39.82	33,262
Palnadu	97	Narasaraopet	Chadalavada Aravinda Babu	TDP	103,167	53.98	Gopireddy Srinivasa Reddy	YSRCP	83,462	43.67	19,705
Palnadu	98	Sattenapalle	Kanna Lakshminaraya	TDP	117,965	55.50	Ambati Rambabu	YSRCP	90,129	42.40	27,836
Palnadu	99	Vinukonda	G. V. Anjaneyulu	TDP	131,438	55.06	Bolla Brahma Naidu	YSRCP	101,171	42.38	30,267
Palnadu	100	Gurajala	Yarapathineni Srinivasa Rao	TDP	1,28,201	55.01	Kasu Mahesh Reddy	YSRCP	98,715	42.36	29,486
Palnadu	101	Macherla	Julakanti Brahmananda Reddy	TDP	122,413	55.62	Pinnelli Ramakrishna Reddy	YSRCP	89,095	40.48	33,318
Prakasam	102	Yerragondapalem (SC)	Tatiparthi Chandrasekhar	YSRCP	91,741	49.40	Guduri Erixion Babu	TDP	86,541	46.60	5,200
Prakasam	103	Darsi	Buchepalli Siva Prasad Reddy	YSRCP	101,889	49.20	Gottipati Lakshmi	TDP	99,433	48.01	2,456
Bapatla	104	Parchur	Yeluri Sambasiva Rao	TDP	110,575	54.67	Yadam Balaji	YSRCP	86,562	42.79	24,013
Bapatla	105	Addanki	Gottipati Ravikumar	TDP	116,418	54.02	Panem Hanimi Reddy	YSRCP	91,528	42.47	24,890
Bapatla	106	Chirala	Madduluri Malakondaiah Yadav	TDP	72,700	42.68	Karanam Venkatesh	YSRCP	51,716	30.36	20,984
Prakasam	107	Santhanuthalapadu (SC)	B. N. Vijay Kumar	TDP	105,757	55.69	Merugu Nagarjuna	YSRCP	75,372	39.69	30,385
Prakasam	108	Ongole	Damacharla Janardhana Rao	TDP	118,800	56.76	Balineni Srinivasa Reddy	YSRCP	84,774	40.50	34,026
Nellore	109	Kandukur	Inturi Nageswara Rao	TDP	109,173	52.80	B. Madhu Sudhan Yadav	YSRCP	90,615	43.82	18,558
Prakasam	110	Kondapi (SC)	Dola Sree Bala Veeranjaneya Swamy	TDP	116,674	54.53	Audimulapu Suresh	YSRCP	91,918	42.96	24,756
Prakasam	111	Markapuram	Kandula Narayana Reddy	TDP	99,005	51.85	Anna Rambabu	YSRCP	85,026	44.53	13,979
Prakasam	112	Giddalur	Muthumula Ashok Reddy	TDP	98,463	47.60	K. P. Nagarjuna Reddy	YSRCP	97,490	47.13	973
Prakasam	113	Kanigiri	Mukku Ugra Narasimha Reddy	TDP	1,07,045	51.93	Daddala Narayana Yadav	YSRCP	92,441	44.84	14,604
Nellore	114	Kavali	Dagumati Venkata Krishna Reddy	TDP	106,536	53.27	Ramireddy Pratap Kumar Reddy	YSRCP	75,588	37.80	30,948
Nellore	115	Atmakur	Anam Ramanarayana Reddy	TDP	91,165	49.85	Mekapati Vikram Reddy	YSRCP	83,589	45.70	7,576
Nellore	116	Kovur	Vemireddy Prashanti Reddy	TDP	130,623	60.68	Nallapareddy Prasanna Kumar Reddy	YSRCP	76,040	35.33	54,583
Nellore	117	Nellore City	Ponguru Narayana	TDP	120,551	68.99	Mohammad Khaleel	YSRCP	48,062	27.51	72,489
Nellore	118	Nellore Rural	Kotamreddy Sridhar Reddy	TDP	109,975	56.53	Adala Prabhakara Reddy	YSRCP	75,495	38.81	34,480
Nellore	119	Sarvepalli	Somireddy Chandra Mohan Reddy	TDP	103,278	52.77	Kakani Govardhan Reddy	YSRCP	86,990	44.45	16,288
Tirupati	120	Gudur (SC)	Pasam Sunil Kumar	TDP	102,675	52.77	Meruga Murali	YSRCP	81,483	41.88	21,192
Tirupati	121	Sullurpeta (SC)	Nelavala Vijayasree	TDP	111,048	54.67	Kiliveti Sanjeevaiah	YSRCP	81,933	40.33	29,115
Tirupati	122	Venkatagiri	Kurugondla Ramakrishna	TDP	104,398	52.31	Nedurumalli Ramkumar Reddy	YSRCP	88,104	44.15	16,294
Nellore	123	Udayagiri	Kakarla Suresh	TDP	101,537	50.54	Mekapati Rajagopal Reddy	YSRCP	91,916	45.75	9,621
Kadapa	124	Badvel (SC)	Dasari Sudha	YSRCP	90,410	51.70	Bojja Roshanna	BJP	71,843	41.08	18,567
Annamayya	125	Rajampet	Akepati Amarnath Reddy	YSRCP	92,609	50.18	Sugavasi Bala Subramanyam	TDP	85,593	46.38	7,016
Kadapa	126	Kadapa	Reddeppagari Madhavi Reddy	TDP	90,988	47.76	Amzath Basha Shaik Bepari	YSRCP	72,128	37.86	18,860
Annamayya	127	Kodur (SC)	Arava Sreedhar	JSP	78,594	51.10	Koramutla Srinivasulu	YSRCP	67,493	43.88	11,101
Annamayya	128	Rayachoti	Mandipalli Ramprasad Reddy	TDP	95,925	47.99	Gadikota Srikanth Reddy	YSRCP	93,430	46.74	2,495
Kadapa	129	Pulivendla	Y. S. Jagan Mohan Reddy	YSRCP	116,315	61.38	Mareddy Ravindranatha Reddy	TDP	54,628	28.83	61,687
Kadapa	130	Kamalapuram	Putha Krishna Chaitanya Reddy	TDP	95,207	55.29	Pochimareddy Ravindranath Reddy	YSRCP	69,850	40.56	25,357
Kadapa	131	Jammalamadugu	Ch. Adinarayana Reddy	BJP	109,640	51.43	Mule Sudheer Reddy	YSRCP	92,449	43.37	17,191
Kadapa	132	Proddatur	Nandyala Varada Rajula Reddy	TDP	106,712	53.02	Rachamallu Siva Prasad Reddy	YSRCP	83,968	41.72	22,744
Kadapa	133	Mydukur	Putta Sudhakar Yadav	TDP	96,181	53.22	Settipalli Raghurami Reddy	YSRCP	75,231	41.62	20,950
Nandyal	134	Allagadda	Bhuma Akhila Priya	TDP	98,881	49.93	Gangula Brijendra Reddy	YSRCP	86,844	43.85	12,037
Nandyal	135	Srisailam	Budda Raja Sekhara Reddy	TDP	81,699	49.64	Silpa Chakrapani Reddy	YSRCP	75,314	45.76	6,385
Nandyal	136	Nandikotkur (SC)	Githa Jayasurya	TDP	92,004	49.24	Dara Sudheer	YSRCP	82,212	44.00	9,792
Kurnool	137	Kurnool	T. G. Bharath	TDP	91,690	51.34	A. Mohammad Imtiaz Ahmed	YSRCP	72,814	40.77	18,876
Kurnool	138	Panyam	Gowru Charitha Reddy	TDP	141,272	56.45	Katasani Ramabhupal Reddy	YSRCP	100,681	40.23	40,591
Nandyal	139	Nandyal	N. Md. Farooq	TDP	103,075	49.42	Silpa Ravichandra Kishore Reddy	YSRCP	90,742	43.51	12,333
Nandyal	140	Banaganapalle	B. C. Janardhan Reddy	TDP	110,603	53.76	Katasani Rami Reddy	YSRCP	85,037	41.33	25,566
Nandyal	141	Dhone	Kotla Jayasurya Prakasha Reddy	TDP	93,523	49.19	Buggana Rajendranath Reddy	YSRCP	87,474	46.01	6,049
Kurnool	142	Pattikonda	K. E. Shyam Kumar	TDP	98,849	51.58	Kangati Sreedevi	YSRCP	84,638	44.17	14,211
Kurnool	143	Kodumur (SC)	Boggula Dastagiri	TDP	101,703	51.49	Audimulapu Sateesh	YSRCP	80,120	40.56	21,583
Kurnool	144	Yemmiganur	Jaya Nageswara Reddy	TDP	103,089	50.76	Butta Renuka	YSRCP	87,252	42.96	15,837
Kurnool	145	Mantralayam	Y. Balanagi Reddy	YSRCP	87,662	49.72	Raghavendra Reddy	TDP	74,857	42.45	12,805
Kurnool	146	Adoni	P. V. Parthasarathi	BJP	89,929	51.06	Y. Sai Prasad Reddy	YSRCP	71,765	40.74	18,164
Kurnool	147	Alur	Busine Virupakshi	YSRCP	100,264	47.65	B. Veerabhadra Gowd	TDP	97,433	46.30	2,831
Anantapur	148	Rayadurg	Kalava Srinivasulu	TDP	130,309	57.09	Mettu Govinda Reddy	YSRCP	88,650	38.84	41,659
Anantapur	149	Uravakonda	Payyavula Keshav	TDP	102,046	52.46	Y. Visweswara Reddy	YSRCP	80,342	41.30	21,704
Anantapur	150	Guntakal	Gummanuru Jayaram	TDP	101,700	49.19	Y. Venkatarama Reddy	YSRCP	94,874	45.89	6,826
Anantapur	151	Tadipatri	J. C. Ashmit Reddy	TDP	113,755	54.77	Kethireddy Pedda Reddy	YSRCP	86,024	41.42	27,731
Anantapur	152	Singanamala (SC)	Bandaru Sravani Sree	TDP	102,957	49.44	M. Veeranjaneyulu	YSRCP	94,169	45.22	8,788
Anantapur	153	Anantapur Urban	Daggupati Venkateswara Prasad	TDP	103,334	54.51	Anantha Venkatarami Reddy	YSRCP	80,311	42.36	23,023
Anantapur	154	Kalyandurg	Amilineni Surendra Babu	TDP	118,878	57.75	Talari Rangaiah	YSRCP	81,144	39.42	37,734
Anantapur	155	Raptadu	Paritala Sunitha	TDP	116,140	53.48	Thopudurthi Prakash Reddy	YSRCP	92,811	42.74	23,329
Sri Sathya Sai	156	Madakasira (SC)	M. S. Raju	TDP	79,983	42.97	Eera Lakkappa	YSRCP	79,632	42.78	351
Sri Sathya Sai	157	Hindupur	Nandamuri Balakrishna	TDP	107,250	54.73	T. N. Deepika	YSRCP	74,653	38.10	32,597
Sri Sathya Sai	158	Penukonda	S. Savitha	TDP	113,832	54.83	K. V. Ushashri Charan	YSRCP	80,444	38.75	33,388
Sri Sathya Sai	159	Puttaparthi	Palle Sindhura Reddy	TDP	91,741	49.87	Duddukunta Sreedhar Reddy	YSRCP	82,981	45.10	8,760
Sri Sathya Sai	160	Dharmavaram	Y. Satya Kumar Yadav	BJP	106,544	48.46	Kethireddy Venkatarami Reddy	YSRCP	102,810	46.76	3,734
Sri Sathya Sai	161	Kadiri	Kandikunta Venkata Prasad	TDP	103,610	49.54	B. S. Maqbool Ahmed	YSRCP	97,345	46.54	6,265
Annamayya	162	Thamballapalle	Peddireddy Dwarkanatha Reddy	YSRCP	94,136	50.11	Jaya Chandra Reddy	TDP	84,033	44.73	10,103
Annamayya	163	Pileru	Nallari Kishore Kumar Reddy	TDP	105,582	54.50	Chintala Ramachandra Reddy	YSRCP	80,501	41.55	25,081
Annamayya	164	Madanapalle	Shahjahan Basha	TDP	97,980	48.30	Nissar Ahmed	YSRCP	92,471	45.58	5,509
Chittoor	165	Punganur	P. Ramachandra Reddy	YSRCP	100,793	48.07	Challa Ramachandra Reddy	TDP	94,698	45.16	6,095
Tirupati	166	Chandragiri	Pulivarthi Nani	TDP	143,667	56.29	Chevireddy Mohith Reddy	YSRCP	99,815	39.10	43,852
Tirupati	167	Tirupati	Arani Srinivasulu	JSP	124,107	64.06	Bhumana Abhinay Reddy	YSRCP	62,151	32.08	61,956
Tirupati	168	Srikalahasti	Bojjala Sudhir Reddy	TDP	121,565	58.08	Biyyapu Madhusudhan Reddy	YSRCP	78,261	37.39	43,304
Tirupati	169	Sathyavedu (SC)	Koneti Adimulam	TDP	85,471	46.32	Nukatoti Rajesh	YSRCP	81,732	44.29	3,739
Chittoor	170	Nagari	Gali Bhanu Prakash	TDP	107,797	60.38	R. K. Roja	YSRCP	62,793	35.17	45,004
Chittoor	171	Gangadhara Nellore (SC)	V. M. Thomas	TDP	101,176	55.22	Kalattur Krupa Lakshmi	YSRCP	75,165	41.02	26,011
Chittoor	172	Chittoor	Gurajala Jagan Mohan	TDP	88,066	52.49	M. Vijayananda Reddy	YSRCP	73,462	43.78	14,604
Chittoor	173	Puthalapattu (SC)	Kalikiri Murali Mohan	TDP	102,137	50.99	M. Sunil Kumar	YSRCP	86,503	43.20	15,634
Chittoor	174	Palamaner	N. Amarnath Reddy	TDP	123,232	52.09	N. Venkate Gowda	YSRCP	103,110	43.59	20,122
Chittoor	175	Kuppam	N. Chandrababu Naidu	TDP	121,929	59.96	K. R. J. Bharath	YSRCP	73,923	36.35	48,006

== Aftermath ==
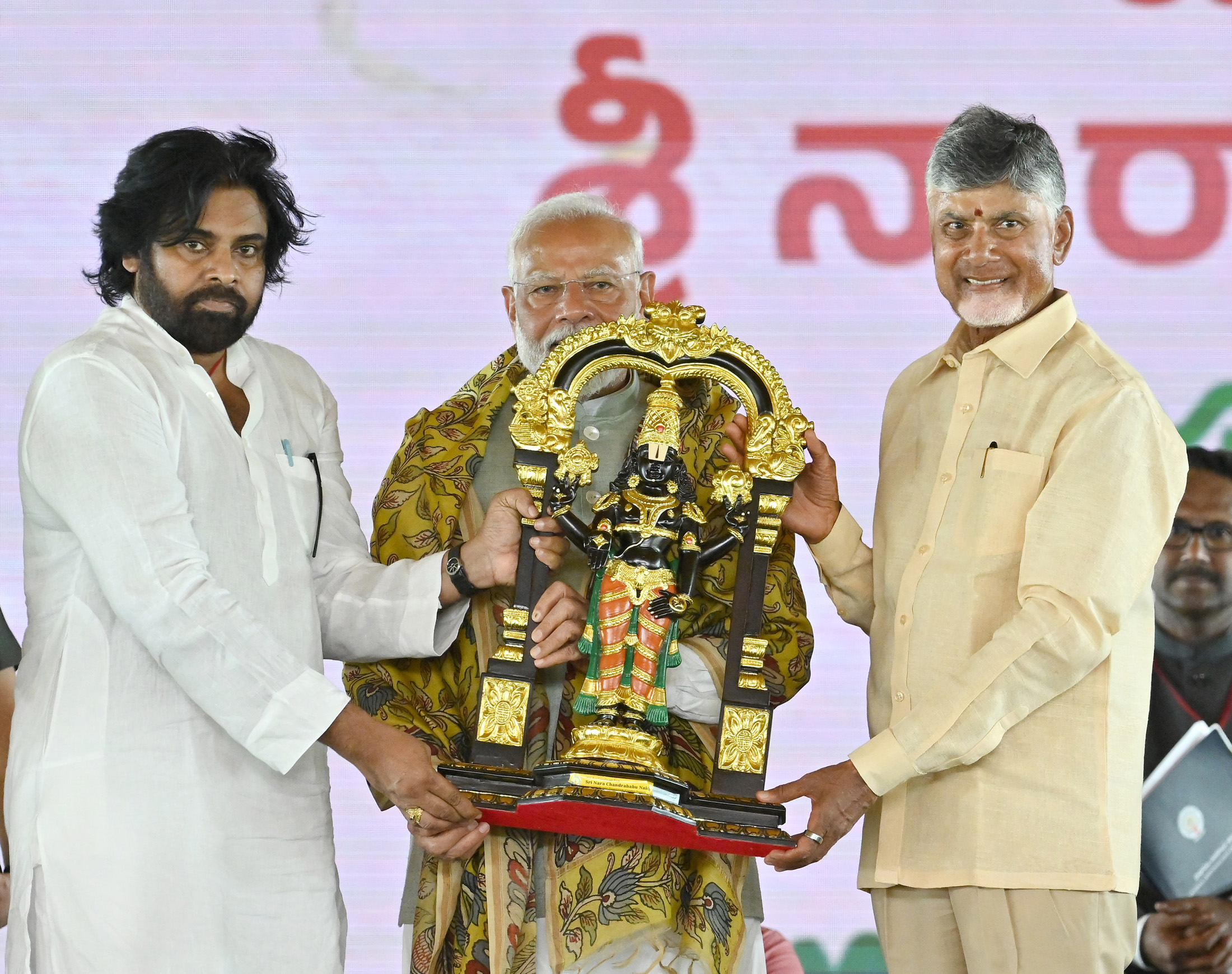
N. Chandrababu Naidu and Pawan Kalyan presenting a Venkateswara idol to Prime Minister Narendra Modi during the swearing-in ceremony.

With N. Chandrababu Naidu, National President of TDP being unanimously elected as NDA leader in the Andhra Pradesh Legislative Assembly backed by the MLA's of the NDA alliance in the state, the NDA formed the government with N. Chandrababu Naidu being sworn in as the Chief Minister of Andhra Pradesh for the fourth time and Pawan Kalyan as the Deputy Chief Minister of Andhra Pradesh. The swearing-in ceremony for Naidu's fourth cabinet took place on 12 June 2024 at Kesarapalli, on the outskirts of Vijayawada. Prime Minister Narendra Modi, along with other dignitaries from the NDA alliance and union ministers attended the event. Notable cinema actors, including Rajinikanth, Chiranjeevi and Ram Charan also graced the occasion.

== See also ==
- Elections in Andhra Pradesh
- 2024 elections in India
- List of chief ministers of Andhra Pradesh
- Government of Andhra Pradesh
