= Baby Nayana =

Indian politician

Member of Legislative Assembly, Andhra Pradesh
- Incumbent
- Assumed office 2024
- Preceded by: S. V. China Appala Naidu
- Constituency: Bobbili

Personal details
- Party: Telugu Desam Party
- Relatives: R. V. Sujay Krishna Ranga Rao (brother)

Ravu Venkata Swetha Chalapathi Kumara Krishna Ranga Rao (born 1981), popularly known as Baby Nayana, is an Indian politician from Andhra Pradesh. He is from the royal family of Bobbili. He was elected in the 2024 Andhra Pradesh Legislative Assembly election as an MLA of Bobbili Assembly constituency, representing Telugu Desam Party.

== Early life ==
Baby Nayana is from the royal family of Maharajas of Bobbili in Vizianagaram district. He was born to Raja Ravu Venkata Gopalakrishna Rangarao and Ravu Alivelu Mangatayaru. He studied Class 12 at St.Michaels Academy, Chennai and passed the intermediate examinations in 1998.

== Career ==
Baby Nayana made his electoral debut in the 2024 Andhra Pradesh Legislative Assembly election winning the Bobbili Assembly constituency in Vizianagaram district. Representing the Telugu Desam Party, he polled 112,366 votes and defeated his nearest rival and the sitting MLA, Sambangi Venkata China Appala Naidu of the YSR Congress Party, by a margin of 44,648 votes.
