= R. V. Sujay Krishna Ranga Rao =

Indian politician

Minister of Mines and Geology, Government of Andhra Pradesh
- In office 2 April 2017 – 29 May 2019
- Governor: E. S. L. Narasimhan
- Chief Minister: N. Chandrababu Naidu
- Preceded by: Peethala Sujatha
- Succeeded by: Peddireddy Ramachandra Reddy

Member of Legislative Assembly, Andhra Pradesh
- In office 2004–2019
- Preceded by: Peddinti Jagan Mohana Rao
- Succeeded by: S. V. China Appala Naidu
- Constituency: Bobbili

Personal details
- Party: Telugu Desam Party (since 2017)
- Other political affiliations: Indian National Congress (until 2014); YSR Congress Party (2014–2017)
- Relatives: Baby Nayana (brother)

Ravu Venkata Sujay Krishna Ranga Rao (born 14 September 1969) is an Indian politician from Andhra Pradesh. He is a three time former member of the Andhra Pradesh Legislative Assembly. He was elected in the Bobbili Assembly constituency in the 2004 and 2009 Andhra Pradesh Legislative Assembly election representing the Indian National Congress. He won for a third time winning the 2014 Assembly election on the YSR Congress Party ticket. He later served as a Minister for Mines and Geology in the cabinet of N. Chandrababu Naidu from 2017 to 2019.

== Personal life and education ==
Ranga Rao hails from the Bobbili Royal family who ruled Bobbili, in the present Vizianagaram district, Andhra Pradesh from 1652-1948 until the zamindari were abolished. His grandfather Ramakrishna Ranga Rao of Bobbili was the chief-minister of Madras Presidency for two terms. His father Gopala Krishna Ranga Rao also served as Member of parliament, Lok Sabha in the 3rd Lok Sabha securing 1,35,315 votes against Kerri Narayana Rao from Cheepurupalli Lok Sabha constituency.

He married Rani Venkata Anupama Ranga Rao and together they have a son and a daughter. He completed his BA at a college affiliated with Madras University, Chennai, in 1991.

== Political career ==
Being the head of the Bobbili family and the titular Raja of Bobbili Estate, he is a three-time M.L.A. from Bobbili (Assembly constituency) from 2004 to 2009 (gaining 53,581 votes), 2009-2014 (securing 75,697 votes), 2014-2019 (securing 83,587 votes) and lost in the 2019 election.

== See also ==
- Bobbili Estate
- Bobbili Fort
