= Thentu Lakshmu Naidu =

Indian politician

- Born: Mugada, Vizianagaram district, Andhra Pradesh, India
- Education: MBA from Staffordshire University, Stoke on Trent, United Kingdom in 2007 & B.Tech from Avanthi Engg. College, Makavampalem in 2003
- Occupation(s): Politician and film Producer
- Years active: 2008–present
- Spouse: Dr.Reshma Manthini
- Children: Jayathi naidu
- Parent(s): Thentu Jaya Prakash, Satyavathi.

Thentu Lakshmu Naidu (Raja) is an Indian politician. He is son of Late Sri Thentu Jaya Prakash (elected as Member for State Legislative Assembly in 1983, 1985, 1989, 1994 and 2004). He was Member of Legislative Assembly representing the then Therlam constituency of Vizianagaram district, Andhra Pradesh state during 2008–2009. He unsuccessfully contested the Bobbili seat in 2009 and 2014.

2014-16 Nominated as AP State Civil Supplies Director

2016-19 Nominated as APSRTC REGIONAL CHAIRPERSON

2024 Nominated as BUDA chairman ( Bobbili urban development authority)
