= Kuppam Assembly constituency =

Constituency of the Andhra Pradesh Legislative Assembly, India

Coordinates: 12.75°N 78.34°E

Kuppam
- Constituency No. 175 for the Andhra Pradesh Legislative Assembly
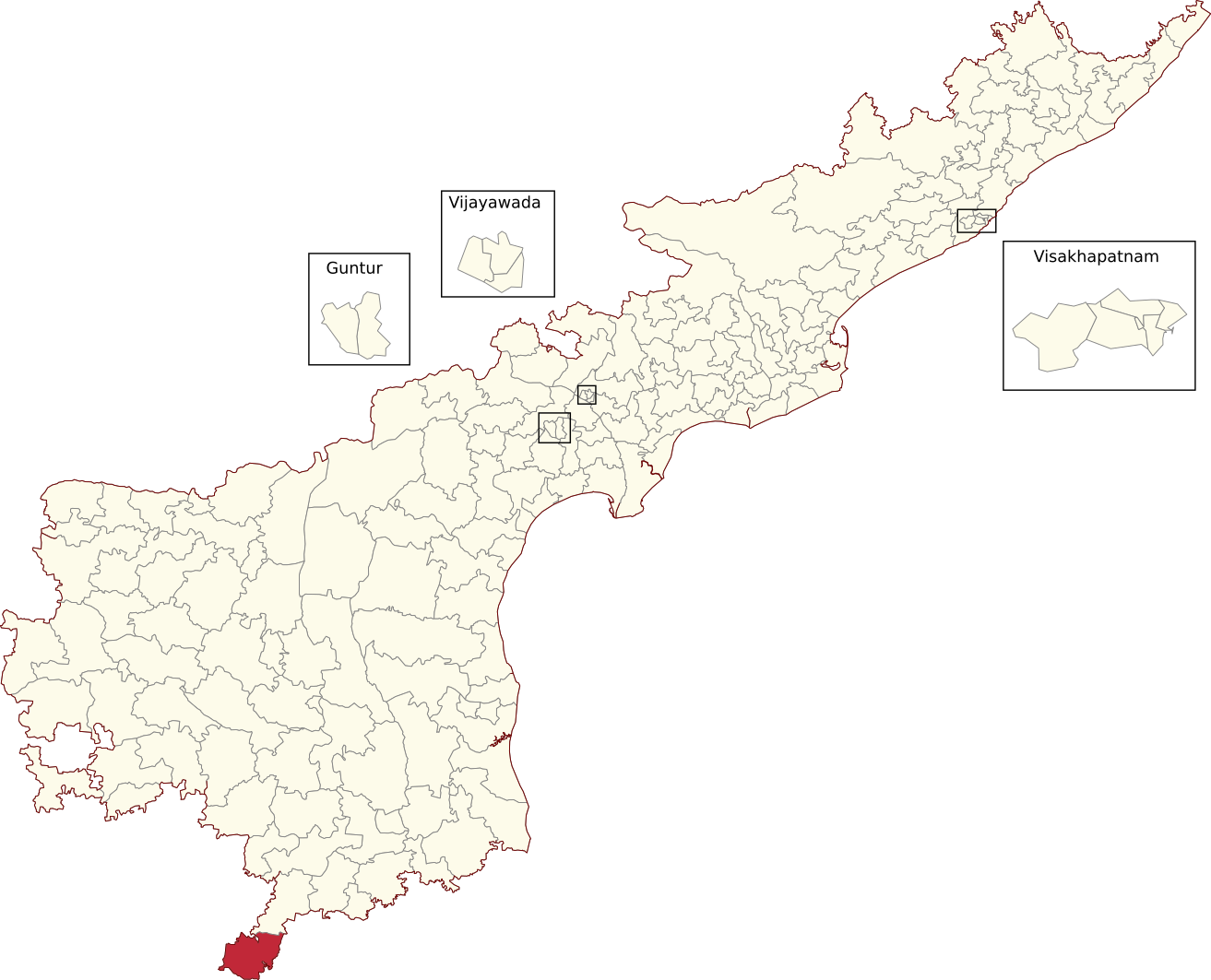
- Location of Kuppam Assembly constituency within Andhra Pradesh

Constituency details
- Country: India
- Region: South India
- State: Andhra Pradesh
- District: Chittoor
- Lok Sabha constituency: Chittoor
- Established: 1955
- Total electors: 2,25,977
- Reservation: None

Member of Legislative Assembly
- 16th Andhra Pradesh Legislative Assembly
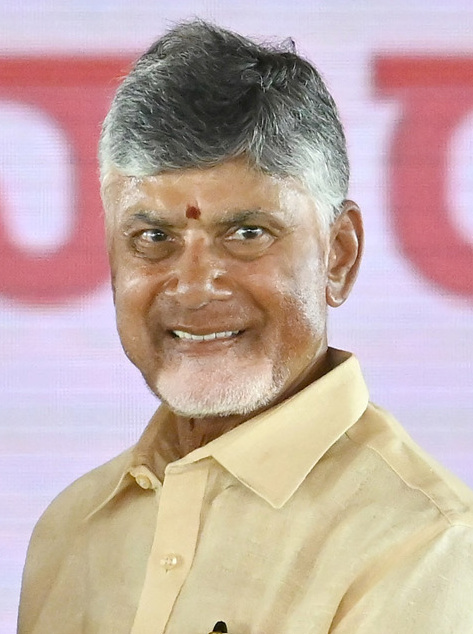
- Incumbent N. Chandrababu Naidu; Chief Minister of Andhra Pradesh
- Party: TDP
- Alliance: NDA
- Elected year: 2024
- Preceded by: N. Rangaswami Naidu, TDP

Kuppam Assembly constituency is a constituency in Chittoor district of Andhra Pradesh that elects representatives to the Andhra Pradesh Legislative Assembly in India. It is one of the seven assembly segments of Chittoor Lok Sabha constituency.

Most Successful parties from Kuppam Assembly
1. TDP (10 Times) (66.7%)
2. INC (2 Times) (13.3%)
3. Independent (2 times) (13.3%)
4. CPI(1 Time) (6.67%)

N. Chandrababu Naidu, the present Chief Minister of Andhra Pradesh is the current MLA of the constituency, having won the 2024 Andhra Pradesh Legislative Assembly election from Telugu Desam Party. As of 2024, there are a total of 2,25,977 electors in the constituency. The constituency was established in 1955, as per the Delimitation Orders (1955).

== Mandals ==
Mandal
Kuppam Municipality
Kuppam
Gudupalle
Santipuram
Ramakuppam

Mandals in Kuppam Assembly Constituency

== Members of the Legislative Assembly ==
Year	Winner	Political party
1955	D. Ramabrahmam	Indian National Congress
1962	A. P. Vajravelu Chetty	Communist Party of India
1967	D. Venkatesham	Independent
1972	D. Venkatesham	Independent
1978	B. R. Doraswamy Naidu	Indian National Congress (I)
1983	N. Rangaswami Naidu	Telugu Desam Party
1985	N. Rangaswami Naidu	Telugu Desam Party
1989	N. Chandrababu Naidu	Telugu Desam Party
1994	N. Chandrababu Naidu	Telugu Desam Party
1999	N. Chandrababu Naidu	Telugu Desam Party
2004	N. Chandrababu Naidu	Telugu Desam Party
2009	N. Chandrababu Naidu	Telugu Desam Party
2014	N. Chandrababu Naidu	Telugu Desam Party
2019	N. Chandrababu Naidu	Telugu Desam Party
2024	N. Chandrababu Naidu	Telugu Desam Party

== Election results ==
Vote share of Winning candidates
2024	59.96%
2019	55.18%
2014	62.59%
2009	61.91%
2004	69.94%
1999	74.42%
1994	75.49%
1989	52.65%
1985	75.83%
1983	60.02%
1978	41.39%
1972	55.14%
1967	34.99%
1962	59.32%
1955	55.18%

=== 2024 ===
2024 Andhra Pradesh Legislative Assembly election: Kuppam
Party	Candidate	Votes	%	±%
TDP	N. Chandrababu Naidu	121,929	59.96	+4.78
YSRCP	K. R. J. Bharath	73,923	36.35	−1.90
INC	A. Govindha Rajulu	2,574	1.27	−0.85
NOTA	None of the above	2,115	1.04	−0.56
Majority		48,006	23.61	+6.68
Turnout		2,03,367	89.99	+4.91
Registered electors		2,25,977		
TDP hold		Swing		

=== 2019 ===
2019 Andhra Pradesh Legislative Assembly election: Kuppam
Party	Candidate	Votes	%	±%
TDP	N. Chandrababu Naidu	100,146	55.18	▼7.41
YSRCP	Krishna Chandra Mouli	69,424	38.25	▲4.31
INC	Dr. B. R. Suresh Babu	3,839	2.12	▲0.43
NOTA	None of the above	2,905	1.60	▲1.05
JSP	Venkataramana Muddhineni	1,879	1.04	New entry
BJP	N. S. Thulasinath	1,139	0.63	New entry
Majority		30,722	16.93	▼11.72
Turnout		1,81,499	85.08	▲1.11
Registered electors		2,13,329		
TDP hold		Swing		

=== 2014 ===
2014 Andhra Pradesh Legislative Assembly election: Kuppam
Party	Candidate	Votes	%	±%
TDP	N. Chandrababu Naidu	102,952	62.59	
YSRCP	K. Chandramouli	55,831	33.94	
INC	K. Srinivasulu	2,785	1.69	
NOTA	None of the above	905	0.55	
IND	2 Independent Candidates	869	0.53	
OTH	2 Other Party Candidates	1,139	0.69	
Majority		47,121	28.65	
Turnout		1,64,481	83.97	
TDP hold		Swing		

=== 2009 ===
2009 Andhra Pradesh Legislative Assembly election: Kuppam
Party	Candidate	Votes	%	±%
TDP	N. Chandrababu Naidu	89,952	61.91	▼8.02
INC	M. Subramanyam Reddy	43,886	30.21	▲2.75
PRP	K. Rajendra Babu	5,366	3.69	New
BJP	N. S. Thulasinath	2,117	1.46	
IND	2 Independent Candidates	1,500	1.04	
OTH	4 Other Party Candidates	2,466	1.70	
Majority		46,066	31.71	
Turnout		1,45,287	82.60	▲7.20
TDP hold		Swing		

=== 2004 ===
2004 Andhra Pradesh Legislative Assembly election: Kuppam
Party	Candidate	Votes	%	±%
TDP	N. Chandrababu Naidu	98,123	69.94	
INC	M. Subramanyam Reddy	38,535	27.47	
IND	Naganna alias Sastri	3,639	2.59	
Majority		59,588	42.47	
Turnout				
TDP hold		Swing		

=== 1999 ===
1999 Andhra Pradesh Legislative Assembly election: Kuppam
Party	Candidate	Votes	%	±%
TDP	N. Chandrababu Naidu	93,288	74.42	
INC	M. Subramanya Reddy	27,601	22.02	
ATDP	B. R. Doraswamy Naidu	4,468	3.56	
Majority		65,687	52.40	
Turnout		129,512	79.99	
TDP hold		Swing		

=== 1994 ===
1994 Andhra Pradesh Legislative Assembly election: Kuppam
Party	Candidate	Votes	%	±%
TDP	N. Chandrababu Naidu	81,210	75.49	
INC	R. Gopinath	24,622	22.89	
BJP	M. T. Venkatapathi	500	0.46	
BSP	C. Subramanyam	231	0.21	
IND	11 Independent Candidates	1,019	0.94	
Majority		56,588	52.60	
Turnout		110,309	76.33	
TDP hold		Swing		

=== 1989 ===
1989 Andhra Pradesh Legislative Assembly election: Kuppam
Party	Candidate	Votes	%	±%
TDP	N. Chandrababu Naidu	50,098	52.65	
INC	B. R. Doraswamy Naidu	43,180	45.38	
BSP	T. Venkatappa	1,114	1.17	
IND	K. K. Sathyanarayana Rao	596	0.63	
IND	Sampangi Ramachari	169	0.18	
Majority		6,918	7.27	
Turnout		99,605	74.36	
TDP hold		Swing		

=== 1985 ===
1985 Andhra Pradesh Legislative Assembly election: Kuppam
Party	Candidate	Votes	%	±%
TDP	N. Rangaswamy Naidu	46,548	75.83	
INC	Dr. S. Krishna	9,584	15.61	
IND	Ghouse	3,088	5.03	
IND	C. L. Munikrishnappa	897	1.46	
IND	Vidyasagara Reddy	745	1.21	
IND	K. V. Suba Reddy	207	0.34	
IND	K. R. Soundara Pandiyan	206	0.34	
IND	Kampalle Sivaramaiah	110	0.18	
Majority		36,964	60.22	
Turnout		62,726	56.98	
Swing to TDP from Independent		Swing		

=== 1983 ===
1983 Andhra Pradesh Legislative Assembly election: Kuppam
Party	Candidate	Votes	%	±%
Telugu Desam Party	N. Rangaswami Naidu	38,543	60.02	
INC	B. R. Doraswami Naidu	24,550	38.23	
IND	K. Venkatappa	1,119	1.74	
Majority		13,993	21.79	
Turnout		65,821	66.68	
Swing to Independent from INC(I)		Swing		

=== 1978 ===
1978 Andhra Pradesh Legislative Assembly election: Kuppam
Party	Candidate	Votes	%	±%
INC(I)	B. R. Doraswamy Naidu	24,664	41.39	
JP	D. Venkatachalam	14,222	23.86	
IND	M. Venkarachalam	7,004	11.75	
AIADMK	R. J. Karunanidhi	5,338	8.96	
INC	A. P. Vajravelu Chetty	4,543	7.62	
IND	G. Govindappa Chetty	3,223	5.41	
IND	G. V. Dayasagar	602	1.01	
Majority		10,442	17.53	
Turnout		61,713	66.29	
Swing to INC(I) from Independent		Swing		

=== 1972 ===
1972 Andhra Pradesh Legislative Assembly election: Kuppam
Party	Candidate	Votes	%	±%
IND	D. Venkatesam	25,915	55.14	
INC	V. Ramaswamy	16,916	35.99	
IND	K. N. Rajan	2,842	6.05	
IND	Nanabalu Munasami	673	1.43	
IND	S. R. Guravaraju	655	1.39	
Majority		8,999	19.15	
Turnout		48,796	57.79	
Independent hold		Swing		

=== 1967 ===
1967 Andhra Pradesh Legislative Assembly election: Kuppam
Party	Candidate	Votes	%	±%
IND	D. Venkatesam	13,542	34.99	
INC	D. Ramabramham	12,945	33.44	
SWA	R. V. Munasaami	7,270	18.78	
CPI(M)	A. P. V. Chetty	4,359	11.26	
IND	L. S. Iyengar	591	1.53	
Majority		597	1.55	
Turnout		42,189	60.83	
Swing to Independent from INC		Swing		

=== 1962 ===
1962 Andhra Pradesh Legislative Assembly election: Kuppam
Party	Candidate	Votes	%	±%
CPI	A. P. Vajravelu Chetty	22,534	59.32	
INC	Ramaswami Naidu	13,882	36.54	
SWA	L. Sundararaja Iyengar	1,572	4.14	
Majority		8,652	22.78	
Turnout		40,045	57.43	
Swing to CPI from INC		Swing		

=== 1955 ===
1955 Andhra State Legislative Assembly election: Kuppam
Party	Candidate	Votes	%	±%
INC	D. Ramabhrmham	14,212	55.18	
CPI	A. P. Vajravelu Chetty	11,545	44.82	
Majority		2,667	10.36	
Turnout		25,757	41.23	
INC win (new seat)				

== Trivia ==
Kuppam assembly constituency is represented by N. Chandrababu Naidu since 1989, who holds the distinction of being the longest-serving Chief Minister (9 years) and Opposition leader (10 years) of United Andhra Pradesh and also served as the 1st Chief Minister of bifurcated Andhra Pradesh (5 years) and is currently serving as the Chief Minister of Andhra Pradesh.

== See also ==
- List of constituencies of the Andhra Pradesh Legislative Assembly
