= Annabathuni Siva Kumar =

Indian politician

Annabathuni Siva Kumar (born 1969) is an Indian politician from Andhra Pradesh. He is an MLA of YSR Congress Party from Tenali Assembly Constituency in Guntur district. He won the 2019 Andhra Pradesh Legislative Assembly election. He contested again on YSR Congress Party ticket but lost the 2024 Andhra Pradesh Legislative Assembly election.

== Early life and education ==
Kumar was born in Tenali to Annabathuni Satyanarayana, a former MLA from Tenali. He completed his B.A from ASN College, Tenali in 1991.

== Career ==
Kumar started his political career with Telugu Desam Party. Later in 2014, he joined YSR Congress Party and contested the 2014 Assembly election but lost from Tenali constituency. However, in the 2019 Andhra Pradesh Legislative Assembly Election he defeated Alapati Rajendra Prasad by a margin of 17,649 votes. In November 2023, he launched a programme called 'Good Morning Tenali', where he visited each ward to hear the grievances of the residents regarding civic issues and to inspect the 10 wards in his constituency. He contested Tenali seat again on YSR Congress Party ticket but lost the 2024 Andhra Pradesh Legislative Assembly election to Nadendla Manohar of Jana Sena Party by a margin of 48,112 votes.

== Controversy ==
Siva Kumar was caught on camera slapping a voter on the election day on 13 May 2024 in a polling booth campus in Tenali. The voter slapped back but a few followers were seen physically assaulting the voter. It was reported that the voter objected to the Siva Kumar jumping the queue. A case was registered on the MLA and his followers. In a complaint to the police, the victim Gottimukkala Sudhakar alleged that the MLA and six of his followers have slapped and manhandled him.
