= Thopudurthi Prakash Reddy =

Indian politician

Thopudurthi Prakash Reddy (born 1974) is an Indian politician from Andhra Pradesh. He won the 2019 Andhra Pradesh Legislative Assembly election on YSRCP ticket from Raptadu constituency in Anantapur district. He defeated Paritala Sreeram by a margin of 25,575 votes.

== Early life and education ==
Prakash Reddy is born to Atma Rami Reddy in 1974. He studied at St. John's English Medium School, Chennai and passed his plus two in 1990. He completed his graduation in Engineering from S. J. C. Institute of Technology, Chikkaballapur, Karnataka in 1995. He married Manorama and has two children, Siddhartha Reddy and Indu.

== Career ==
He lost the Assembly elections to Paritala Sunitha in 2009 on a Congress ticket and then in 2014 when he contested on behalf of YSR Congress Party. He won the 2019 election defeating Sunitha's son Paritala Sreeram. He lobbied for getting the mega textile park work re-start near Raptadu in Anantapur district. Both Paritala and Thopudurthi families have a running feud politically.

A police case was registered against him on 10 April 2025 in Ramagiri police station by a constable who was injured in the melee following the collapse of the barricades near a helipad during the recent visit of former chief minister Y. S. Jagan Mohan Reddy.
