= Kamana Prabhakara Rao =

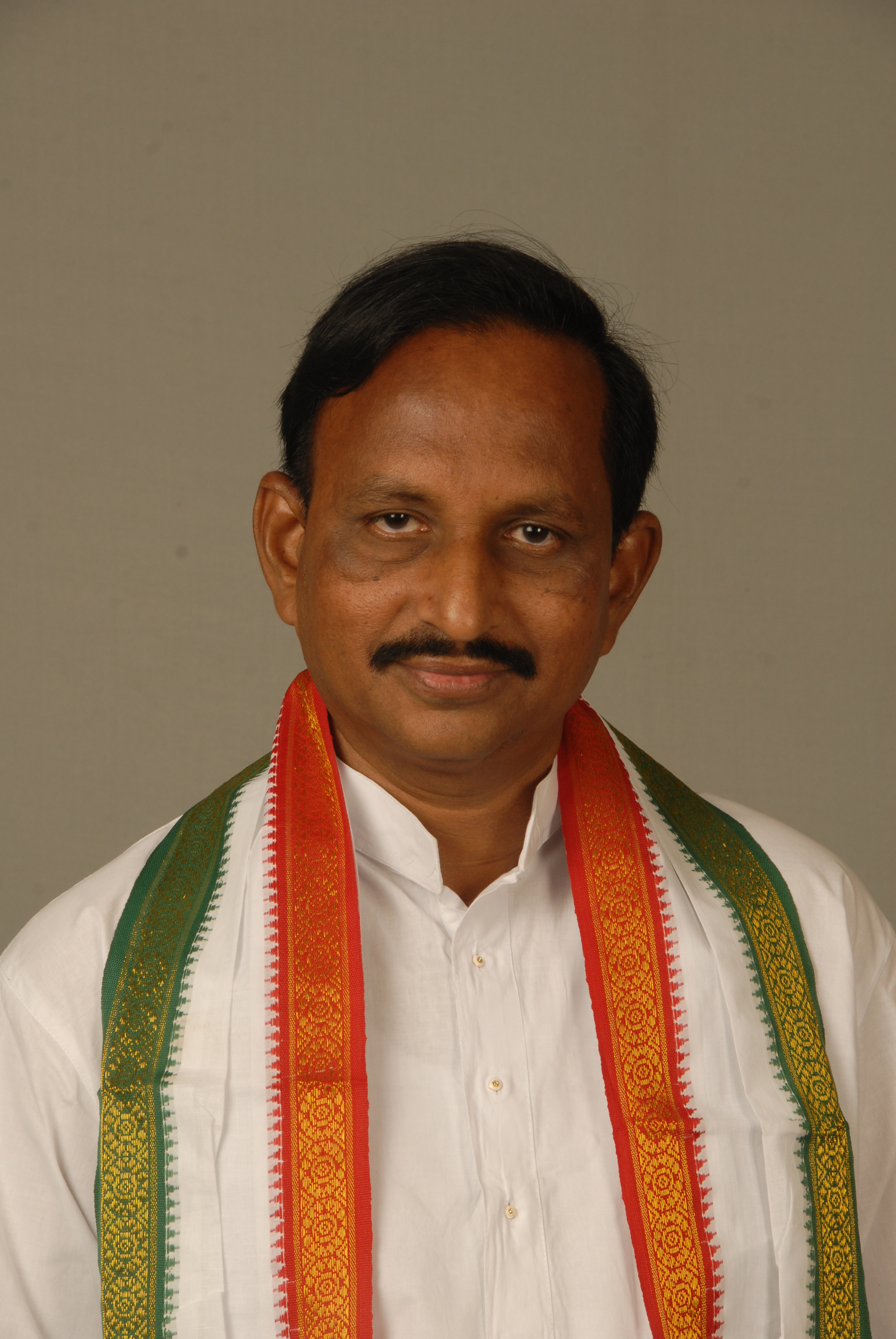
- Constituency: Mandapeta

Personal details
- Born: 25 May 1962 (age 64) Mandapeta, Andhra Pradesh
- Party: Indian National Congress
- Spouse: Satyavani
- Children: Two sons

Kamana Prabhakara Rao (Telugu: కామన ప్రభాకర రావు), is a politician from Andhra Pradesh in India. He is contesting for Mandapeta assembly constituency, representing the Indian National Congress.

== Social activities ==
- Worked as Life Member of the Indian Red Cross Society & arranged massive flood relief to Godavari 1986 flood victims distributed help to 600 flood victims with the patronage from M/s. Nagarjuna Fertilizers and Chemicals Limited, Kakinada.
- Running Voluntary organization, Dr.DNR Bhavan Trust, which works on Education, Health and Women Empowerment, Blood Donation Camps; and Dr.DNR Bhavan Computer Education and Information Technology (affiliated to State Board of Technical Education and Training), which offers free computer education to poor people of Mandapeta.

== Political life ==
- Kamana, led the student's wing of Congress Party, in 1978 and protested against prosecution of Indira Gandhi, Janata Party Government
- Chairman of the Alamuru Constituency Electricity Advisory Committee 1993-94
- Member of the District Level Prohibition Committee of East Godavari District 1993-94
- WHIP & Floor Leader of Congress Party MPTCs in the Mandal Parishad Mandapeta 1994-99
- MPTC Member from Yeditha 1994-99
- Convener of the District Panchayat Raj Abhiyan of East Godavari District Congress Committee 1993-98
- Organizing Secretary of East Godavari District Youth Congress 1986-89
- Organizing Secretary of East Godavari District Congress Committee 1990-94
- Official Spokesperson, East Godavari District Congress Committee 2000-2007
- Member, East Godavari District Telecom Advisory Committee, BSNL 2003-2006
- P.C.C. Member 2002-2013
- Coordinator, Pithapuram Constituency Congress Co- ordination Committee 2003-2004
- Election In-charge for Peddapuram and Samarlkot Municipalities held in 2006 for success of the Candidates.
- Election In-charge for Kadiyam Constituency for Z.P.T.C. and M.P.T.C. elections held in 2006 for success of the candidates
- Reception Committee Member for AICC Plenary Session held at Hyderabad in the month January, 2006 for success of the session
- In charge of 2009 elections RampaChodavaram Assembly Constituency, played a vital role for the success of the candidate.

== Stand on State division ==
PCC secretary Kamana Prabhakara Rao issued a statement by welcoming the AICC's decision to suspend the MPs who are working against the interests of the party, on Andhra Pradesh division issue.
