= Bobbili Assembly constituency =

Constituency of the Andhra Pradesh Legislative Assembly, India

Coordinates: 18.57°N 83.37°E

Bobbili
- Constituency No. 14 for the Andhra Pradesh Legislative Assembly
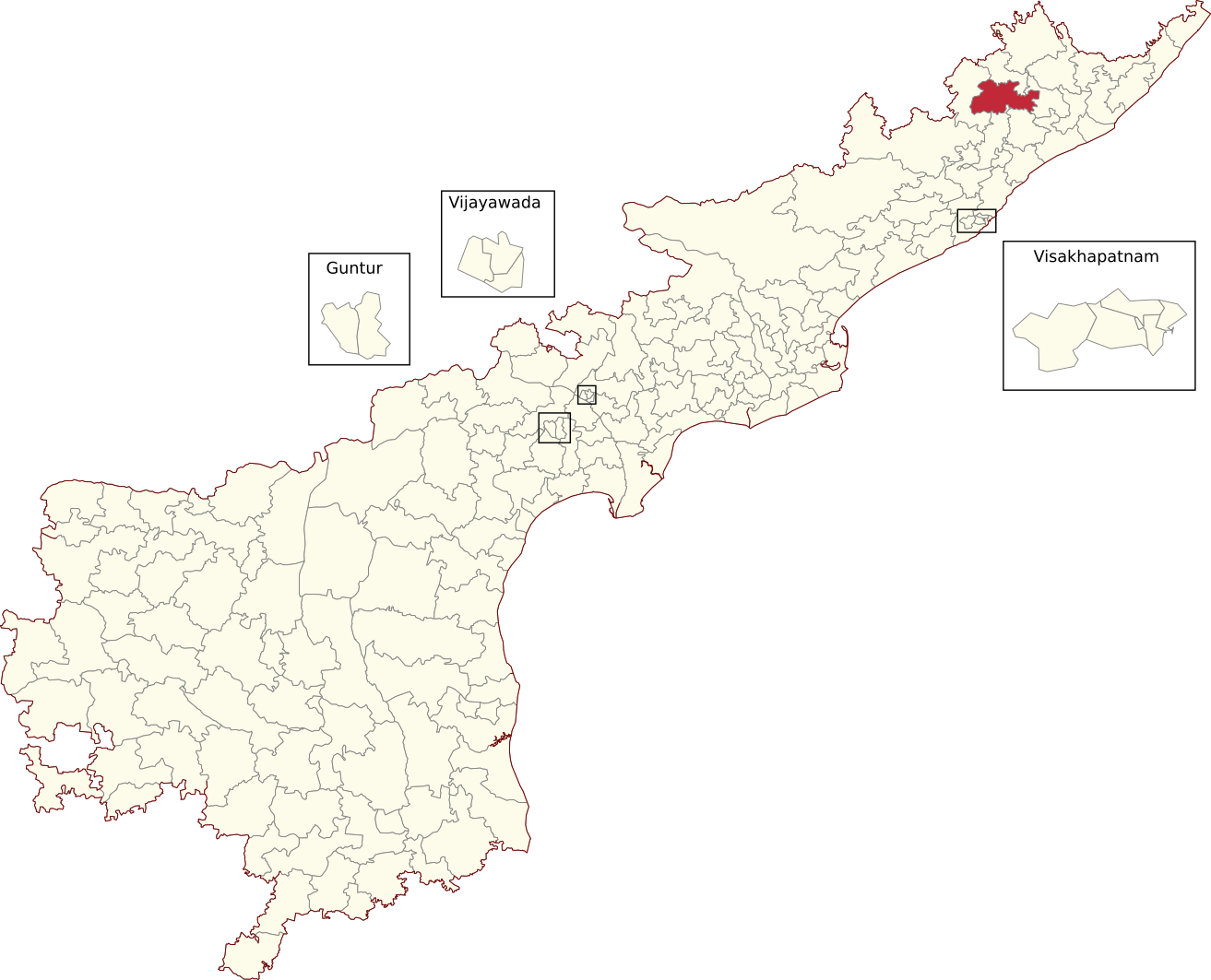
- Location of Bobbili Assembly constituency within Andhra Pradesh

Constituency details
- Country: India
- Region: South India
- State: Andhra Pradesh
- District: Vizianagaram
- Lok Sabha constituency: Vizianagaram
- Established: 1951
- Total electors: 220,017
- Reservation: None

Member of Legislative Assembly
- 16th Andhra Pradesh Legislative Assembly
- Incumbent R. V. S. K. K. Ranga Rao (Babynayana)
- Party: TDP
- Alliance: NDA
- Elected year: 2024

Bobbili Assembly constituency is a constituency in Vizianagaram district of Andhra Pradesh that elects representatives to the Andhra Pradesh Legislative Assembly in India. It is one of the seven assembly segments of Vizianagaram Lok Sabha constituency.

R. V. S. K. K. Ranga Rao (Babynayana) is the current MLA of the constituency, having won the 2024 Andhra Pradesh Legislative Assembly election from Telugu Desam Party. As of 2019, there are a total of 220,017 electors in the constituency. The constituency was established in 1951, as per the Delimitation Orders (1951).

== Mandals ==
The four mandals that form the assembly constituency are:

Mandal
Bobbili
Ramabhadrapuram
Badangi
Therlam

Mandals in Bobbili Assembly Constituency

== Members of the Legislative Assembly ==
Year	Member	Political party
1955	Kotagiri Sitharama Swamy	Indian National Congress
1962	Tentu Lakshmu Naidu	Indian National Congress
1967	S. R. K. R. Rao	Independent
1972	C. V. Krishna Rao	Indian National Congress
1978	Kolli Venkata Kurmi Naidu	Janata Party
1983	Sambangi Venkata China Appalanaidu	Telugu Desam Party
1985	Sambangi Venkata China Appalanaidu	Telugu Desam Party
1989	Jagan Mohana Rao Peddinti	Indian National Congress
1994	Sambangi Venkata China Appala Naidu	Telugu Desam Party
1999	Jagan Mohana Rao Peddinti	Indian National Congress
2004	Ravu Venkata Sujay Krishna Rangarao	Indian National Congress
2009	Ravu Venkata Sujay Krishna Rangarao	Indian National Congress
2014	Ravu Venkata Sujay Krishna Rangarao	YSR Congress Party
2019	Sambangi Venkata China Appala Naidu	YSR Congress Party
2024	R. V. S. K. K. Ranga Rao (Babynayana)	Telugu Desam Party

== Election results ==
=== 2024 ===
2024 Andhra Pradesh Legislative Assembly election:
Party	Candidate	Votes	%	±%
TDP				▲
YSRCP				▼
				−−
Remaining	"" Candidates			▼
NOTA	None of the above			▲
Turnout				▲
Registered electors				▲
Majority				
gain from		Swing		

=== 2019 ===
2019 Andhra Pradesh Legislative Assembly election:
Party	Candidate	Votes	%	±%
YSRCP				▲
TDP				▼
				New
Remaining	"" Candidates			▼
NOTA	None of the above			▲
Turnout				▲
Registered electors				▲
Majority				
gain from		Swing		

=== 2014 ===
2014 Andhra Pradesh Legislative Assembly election:
Party	Candidate	Votes	%	±%
INC				
Remaining	"" Candidates			
NOTA	None of the above			
Turnout				
Registered electors				
Majority				
gain from		Swing		

=== 1952 ===
1952 Madras State Legislative Assembly election: Bobbili
Party	Candidate	Votes	%	±%
Socialist Party (India)	Kolli kuruni naidu	18,263	49.48%	
INC	Kotagiri Seetharamaswami	13,877	37.60%	37.60%
KLP	Anjajala Venkatesan	4,770	12.92%	
Margin of victory		4,386	11.88%	
Turnout		36,910	60.19%	
Registered electors		61,326		
SP win (new seat)				

=== 1955 ===
1955 Andhra State Legislative Assembly election: Bobbili
Party	Candidate	Votes	%	±%
INC	Kotagiri Swamy	14,031	41.77	▲4.17
PSP	Tentu Naidu	13,674	40.70	
Independent	Sunkarapelli Nayya	4,488	13.36	
Independent	Adabala Sitharamayya	1,400	4.17	
Majority		357	1.07	▼10.81
Turnout		33,593	52.90	▼7.29
INC gain from Socialist Party (India)		Swing		

=== 1962 ===
1962 Andhra Pradesh Legislative Assembly election: Bobbili
Party	Candidate	Votes	%	±%
INC	Tentu Naidu	27,978	77.77	▲36
PSP	Ari Gangayya	7,993	22.22	▼18.48
Majority		19,985	55.55	▲54.48
Turnout		35,971	79.2	▼0.6
INC hold		Swing		

=== 1967 ===
1967 Andhra Pradesh Legislative Assembly election: Bobbili
Party	Candidate	Votes	%	±%
Independent	R. S. Ramakrishna Ranga Rao	42,065	75.70	
INC	L. Thentu	13,504	24.30	▼53.47
Majority		28,561	51.40	▼4.15
Turnout		55,569	83.60	
Independent hold		Swing		

=== 1972 ===
1972 Andhra Pradesh Legislative Assembly election: Bobbili
Party	Candidate	Votes	%	±%
INC	C. V. Rao	29,925	50.34	▲1.31
Independent	Kollivenkata Kuriminaidu	27,578	46.40	
Independent	Rama Rao	1,937	3.26	
Majority		2,347	3.94	▼47.46
Turnout		59,440	74.41	▲1.16
INC gain from Independent		Swing		

=== 1978 ===
1978 Andhra Pradesh Legislative Assembly election: Bobbili
Party	Candidate	Votes	%	±%
JP	Kolli Naidu	29,184	42.1	▼4.3
Independent	Reddy Sao	15,707	22.7	
INC(I)	Chappa Naidu	11,226	16.2	
INC	Marrapu Satynarayana	6,915	10.0	
Independent	Sala Rao	4,703	6.8	
Independent	Reddy Krishnamurthy	1,515	2.2	
Majority		13,477	18.9	▲14.96
Turnout		71,204	84.1	▲9.69
JP gain from INC		Swing		

=== 1983 ===
1983 Andhra Pradesh Legislative Assembly election: Bobbili
Party	Candidate	Votes	%	±%
TDP	Sambangi Appalanaidu	40,610	60.2	
INC	Krishnamurthy Vasireddi	23,660	35.0	▲18.8
Independent	Kasturi Gowrisankararaju	2,197	3.3	
Independent	Botcha Ramulu	1,047	1.6	
Majority		16,950	24.6	▲5.7
Turnout		68,829	77.8	▼6.3
TDP gain from JP		Swing		

=== 1985 ===
1985 Andhra Pradesh Legislative Assembly election: Bobbili
Party	Candidate	Votes	%	±%
TDP	Sambangi Appalanaidu	44,875	72.2	▲12
INC	Inuganti Murty	15,427	24.8	▼10.2
Independent	Botsa Ramula	792	1.3	
Independent	Vasireddi Kumar	430	0.7	
Independent	Adinarayana Thelu	341	0.6	
Independent	Arasada Satyam	279	0.5	
Majority		29,448	46.5	▲21.9
Turnout		63,307	66.4	▼11.4
TDP hold		Swing		

=== 1989 ===
1989 Andhra Pradesh Legislative Assembly election: Bobbili
Party	Candidate	Votes	%	±%
INC	Jagan Peddinti	41,809	49.5	▲24.7
TDP	China Venkata	41,711	49.4	▼22.8
Independent	Madasi Mahalakshmi	899	1.1	New
Majority		98	0.1	▼46.4
Turnout		87,958	79.4	▲13
INC gain from TDP		Swing		

=== 1994 ===
1994 Andhra Pradesh Legislative Assembly election: Bobbili
Party	Candidate	Votes	%	±%
TDP	Sambangi Naidu	38,725	41.7	▼7.7
INC	Jagan Peddinti	32,638	35.1	▼14.4
Independent	Vakada Rao	13,557	14.6	
BJP	Reddi Rao	6,063	6.5	
Independent	Botcha Simhachalam	601	0.7	
BSP	Gottapu Naidu	388	0.4	
Independent	Botsa Ramulu	86	0.1	
Independent	Botsa Ramulu	380	0.4	
Majority		6,087	6.4	▲6.3
Turnout		94,606	79.8	▲0.4
TDP hold		Swing		

=== 1999 ===
1999 Andhra Pradesh Legislative Assembly election: Bobbili
Party	Candidate	Votes	%	±%
INC	Jagan Mohana Rao Peddinti	50,803	54.5	▲19.4
TDP	Appala China	41,491	44.5	▲2.8
Anna Telugu Desam Party	Appala Meesala	677	0.7	
Independent	Appalaswamy Kalipindi	146	0.2	
Independent	Botsa Ramulu	86	0.1	
Majority		9,312	9.8	▲3.4
Turnout		95,155	79.2	▼0.6
INC gain from TDP		Swing		

=== 2004 ===
2004 Andhra Pradesh Legislative Assembly election: Bobbili
Party	Candidate	Votes	%	±%
INC	Ravu Venkata Sujay Krishna Rangarao	53,581	53.81	−0.70
TDP	Appalanaidu S.V.Ch.	40,891	41.06	−3.46
Majority		12,690	12.75	
Turnout		99,583	81.93	+4.37
INC hold		Swing		

=== 2009 ===
2009 Andhra Pradesh Legislative Assembly election: Bobbili
Party	Candidate	Votes	%	±%
INC	Ravu Venkata Sujay Krishna Rangarao	75,697	49.13	−4.68
TDP	Thentu Lakshmu Naidu	51,525	33.44	−7.62
PRP	Venkataramana Merupalli	15,115	9.81	
Independent	Kolli Yerukunaidu	11,876	8.98	
Majority		24,172	15.69	
Turnout		154,065	76.25	−5.68
INC hold		Swing		

== See also ==
- List of constituencies of the Andhra Pradesh Legislative Assembly
