= Tadepalli, Vijayawada Rural mandal =

Tadepalli
- Village
- Interactive map of Tadepalli
- Location in Andhra Pradesh, India Tadepalli (India)
- Coordinates: 16°36′12″N 80°37′15″E
- Country: India
- State: Andhra Pradesh
- District: NTR

Area
  - Total: 2.18 km^{2} (0.84 sq mi)

Population (2011)
  - Total: 1,468
  - Density: 673/km^{2} (1,740/sq mi)

Languages
  - Official: Telugu
- Time zone: UTC+5:30 (IST)
- Vehicle registration: AP

Tadepalli is a village in NTR district of the Indian state of Andhra Pradesh. It is located in Vijayawada Rural mandal of Vijayawada revenue division. It is one of the villages in the mandal to be a part of Andhra Pradesh Capital Region.
