= K. R. J. Bharath =

Indian politician

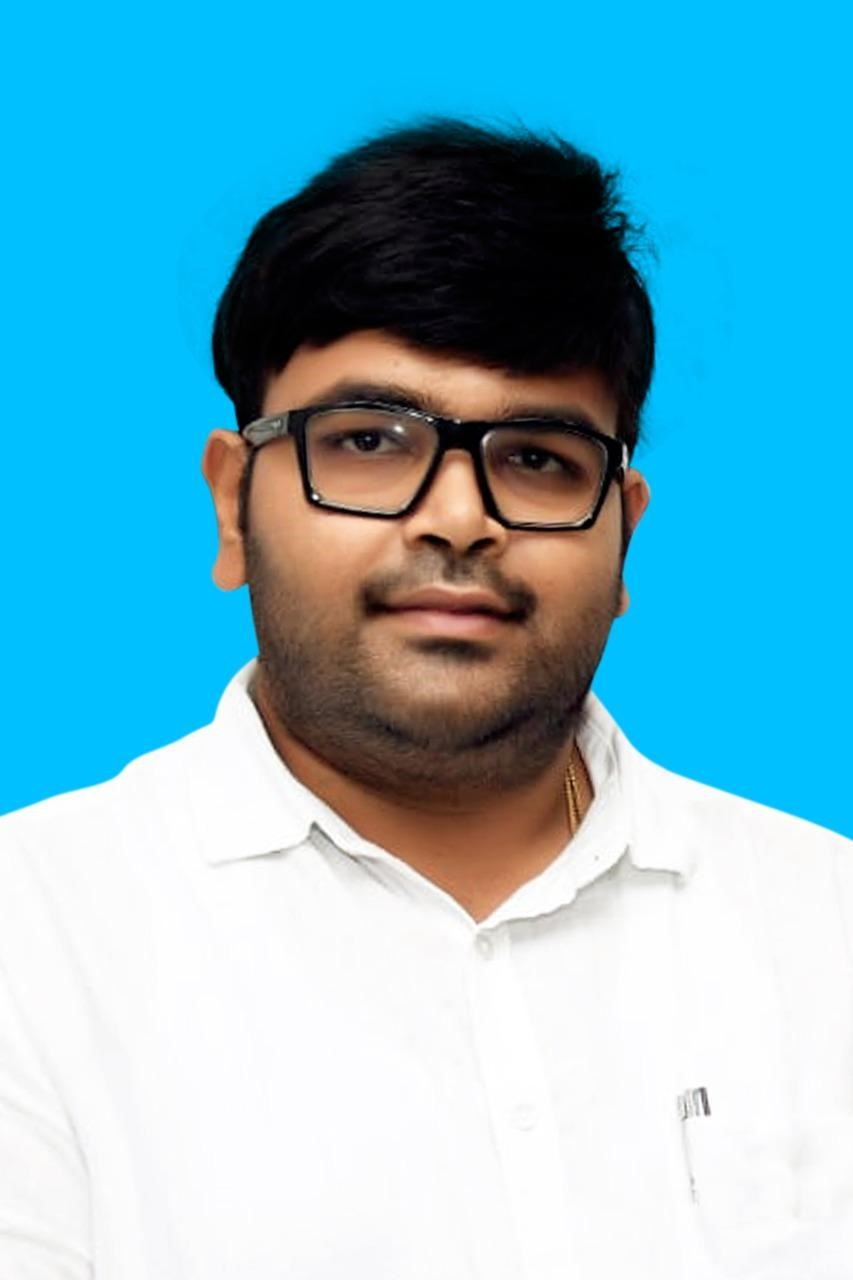

Member of Andhra Pradesh Legislative Council from Chittoor
- Incumbent
- Assumed office 2021
- Constituency: Chittoor Local Authorities constituency

Personal details
- Born: 13 November 1988 Andhra Pradesh
- Party: YSR Congress Party
- Spouse: Durga
- Education: CBIT

Krishna Raghava Jayendra Bharath (13 November 1988), commonly known as K. R. J. Bharath is an Indian politician currently serving as Member of The Legislative Council, Chittoor, Andhra Pradesh, he is also Kuppam YSRCP Incharge, Chittoor district. He is the son of former IAS officer K. Chandramouli who contested against Nara Chandrababu Naidu in 2014 and 2019 elections but was defeated. He also contested against Chandrababu Naidu in 2024, but defeated.

Bharath started his political career in the YSR Congress Party and was elected as the Member of Legislative Council, Chiittor, Andhra Pradesh after his fathers death due to illness in 2019.
