= S. V. China Appala Naidu =

Indian politician

Sambangi Venkatachina Appala Naidu (born 1955) is an Indian politician who is serving as Member of 15th Andhra Pradesh Assembly from Bobbili Assembly constituency.

== Early life ==
Appala Naidu hails from Pakki village in Bobbili mandal, Vizianagaram district. He belongs to Velama caste. His father Surapu Naidu is a farmer. He studied intermediate(plus two) and later completed his graduation.

== Career ==
He began his political career as a village sarpanch in 1976. Following the call given by late chief minister NT Ramarao, he joined Telugu Desam Party and became an MLA for the first time in 1983. He won as MLA again in 1994 and was made the government whip in 1995. After winning the 2019 Andhra Pradesh Legislative Assembly Election on YSRCP ticket, he was made as the pro tem speaker and administered oath to all the 175 MLAs.
