= Anantapur Lok Sabha constituency =

Lok Sabha Constituency in Andhra Pradesh

Ananthapuram
- Lok Sabha constituency
- Interactive Map Outlining Anantapur Lok Sabha constituency

Constituency details
- Country: India
- Region: South India
- State: Andhra Pradesh
- Assembly constituencies: Rayadurg; Uravakonda; Guntakal; Tadpatri; Singanamala; Anantapur Urban; Kalyandurg
- Established: 1952
- Reservation: None

Member of Parliament
- 18th Lok Sabha
- Incumbent G. Lakshminarayana
- Party: TDP
- Alliance: NDA
- Elected year: 2024
- Preceded by: Talari Rangaiah

Anantapur Lok Sabha constituency is one of the twenty-five lok sabha constituencies of Andhra Pradesh in India. It comprises seven assembly segments and belongs to Anantapur district.

Most Successful parties from Anantapur Lok Sabha
1. INC (12 Times) (70.0%)
2. TDP (4 Times) (18.0%)
3. CPI (1 time) (6.00%)
4. YSRCP (1 time) (6.00%)

== Assembly segments ==
Anantapur Lok Sabha constituency comprises the following Legislative Assembly segments:

#	Name	District	Member	Party	Leading (in 2024)
148	Rayadurg	Anantapur	Kalava Srinivasulu	TDP	TDP
149	Uravakonda	Anantapur	Payyavula Keshav	TDP	TDP
150	Guntakal	Anantapur	Gummanur Jayaram	TDP	TDP
151	Tadpatri	Anantapur	J.C.Ashmit Reddy	TDP	TDP
152	Singanamala (SC)	Anantapur	Bandaru Sravani Sree	TDP	TDP
153	Anantapur Urban	Anantapur	Daggupati Venkateswara Prasad	TDP	TDP
154	Kalyandurg	Anantapur	Amilineni Surendra Babu	TDP	TDP

== Members of Parliament ==
Year	Member	Party
1952	Paidi Lakshmayya	Indian National Congress
1957	T. Nagi Reddy	Communist Party of India
1962	Osman Ali Khan	Indian National Congress
1967	Ponnapati Antony Reddi	Indian National Congress
1971	Ponnapati Antony Reddi	Indian National Congress
1977	Darur Pullaiah	Indian National Congress
1980	Darur Pullaiah	Indian National Congress (I)
1984	Devineni Narayanaswami	Telugu Desam Party
1989	Anantha Venkata Reddy	Indian National Congress
1991	Anantha Venkata Reddy	Indian National Congress
1996	Anantha Venkatarami Reddy	Indian National Congress
1998	Anantha Venkatarami Reddy	Indian National Congress
1999	Kalava Srinivasulu	Telugu Desam Party
2004	Anantha Venkatarami Reddy	Indian National Congress
2009	Anantha Venkatarami Reddy	Indian National Congress
2014	J. C. Diwakar Reddy	Telugu Desam Party
2019	Talari Rangaiah	YSR Congress Party
2024	G. Lakshminarayana	Telugu Desam Party

== Election results ==
=== General Election 1989 ===
General Election, 1989: Ananthapur
Party	Candidate	Votes	%	±%
INC	Anantha Venkata Reddy	349,685	53.85	+15.97
TDP	G. Ramanna Chowdary	290,203	44.69	−14.45
Majority		59,482	9.16	
Turnout		649,375	64.05	+0.01
INC gain from TDP		Swing		

=== General Election 1991 ===
General Election, 1991: Ananthapur
Party	Candidate	Votes	%	±%
INC	Anantha Venkata Reddy	362,676	59.14	+5.29
TDP	B.T.L.N. Chowdary	200,392	32.67	−12.02
Majority		162,284	26.47	
Turnout		613,298	60.36	−3.69
INC hold		Swing		

=== General Election 1996 ===
General Election, 1996: Ananthapur
Party	Candidate	Votes	%	±%
INC	Anantha Venkatarami Reddy	288,845	44.60	−14.54
CPI	R.Rangappa	205,986	32.25	
NTRTDP(LP)	V Prabhakara Chowdary	94,485	14.79	
Majority		82,859	12.35	
Turnout		638,636	52.58	+7.78
INC hold		Swing		

=== General Election 1998 ===
General Election, 1998: Ananthapur
Party	Candidate	Votes	%	±%
INC	Anantha Venkatarami Reddy	320,474	44.60	+3.05
CPI	R.Ramakrishna	238,076	35.40	+3.15
BJP	Veluri Kesava Chowdari	93,339	13.88	
Majority		82,398	9.20	
Turnout		672,528	55.44	+2.86
INC hold		Swing		

=== General Election 1999 ===
General Election, 1999: Ananthapur
Party	Candidate	Votes	%	±%
TDP	Kalava Srinivasulu	378,488	50.27	+14.87
INC	Anantha Venkatarami Reddy	357,386	47.47	+3.17
Majority		21,102	2.80	
Turnout		752,838	61.39	+5.95
TDP gain from INC		Swing		

=== General Election 2004 ===
General Election, 2004: Ananthapur
Party	Candidate	Votes	%	±%
INC	Anantha Venkatarami Reddy	458,925	52.44	+4.97
TDP	Kalava Srinivasulu	385,521	44.05	−6.22
BSP	Nagabhushanam Gaddala	9,296	1.06	
Independent	Yatham Pothalaiah	7,102	0.81	
Pyramid Party of India	K Venkatesulu	6,232	0.71	−6.56
TRS	A Jagan Mohan Rao	4,419	0.50	
Independent	B S Amarnath	3,640	0.42	
Majority		73,404	8.39	
Turnout		875,135	68.42	+5.43
INC gain from TDP		Swing		

=== General Election 2009 ===
General Election, 2009: Ananthapur
Party	Candidate	Votes	%	±%
INC	Anantha Venkatarami Reddy	457,876	45.78	−6.66
TDP	Kalava Srinivasulu	379,955	37.99	−6.06
PRP	G. S. Mansoor	102,047	10.20	
BJP	Ambati Rama Krishna Reddy	16,540	1.65	
Majority		77,921	7.79	
Turnout		1,000,208	70.86	+2.44
INC hold		Swing		

=== General Election 2014 ===
General Election, 2014: Ananthapur
Party	Candidate	Votes	%	±%
TDP	J.C. Diwakar Reddy	606,509	50.33	−6.06
YSRCP	Anantha Venkatarami Reddy	545,240	45.25	
INC	Anil Chowdary.P	16,659	1.38	
Majority		61,269	5.08	
Turnout		1,205,054	78.41	+7.55
TDP gain from INC		Swing		

=== General Election 2019 ===
2019 Indian general elections: Ananthapur
Party	Candidate	Votes	%	±%
YSRCP	Talari Rangaiah	695,208	51.57	+6.51
TDP	J. C. Pavan Kumar Reddy	553,780	41.08	−9.07
INC	K. Rajiv Reddy	30,079	2.23	
CPI	D. Jagadeesh	20,294	1.51	
NOTA	None of the above	16,466	1.22	
BJP	Hamsa Devineni	7,604	0.56	
Majority		141,428	10.53	
Turnout		1348114	81.01	+2.60
Registered electors		16,64,160		
YSRCP gain from TDP		Swing	+7.78	

=== General election 2024 ===
2024 Indian general election: Ananthapur
Party	Candidate	Votes	%	±%
TDP	G. Lakshminarayana	768,245	53.33	
YSRCP	Malagundla Sankaranarayana	5,79,690	40.24	
INC	Mallikarjuna Vajjala	43,217	3.00	
NOTA	None of the above	9,199	0.64	
Majority		1,88,555	13.09	
Turnout		14,45,498	81.70	
TDP gain from YSRCP		Swing		

== See also ==
- List of constituencies of the Andhra Pradesh Legislative Assembly
