= Juturu =

Juturu (Telugu: జూటూరు) is a Telugu surname. Notable people with the surname include:

- Juturu Chinnareddy Ashmit Reddy (born 1983), Indian politician
- Juturu Chinnareddy Prabhakar Reddy (born 1952), Indian politician
