= Jammalamadugu Assembly constituency =

Constituency of the Andhra Pradesh Legislative Assembly, India

Coordinates: 14.84°N 78.39°E

Jammalamadugu
- Constituency No. 131 for the Andhra Pradesh Legislative Assembly
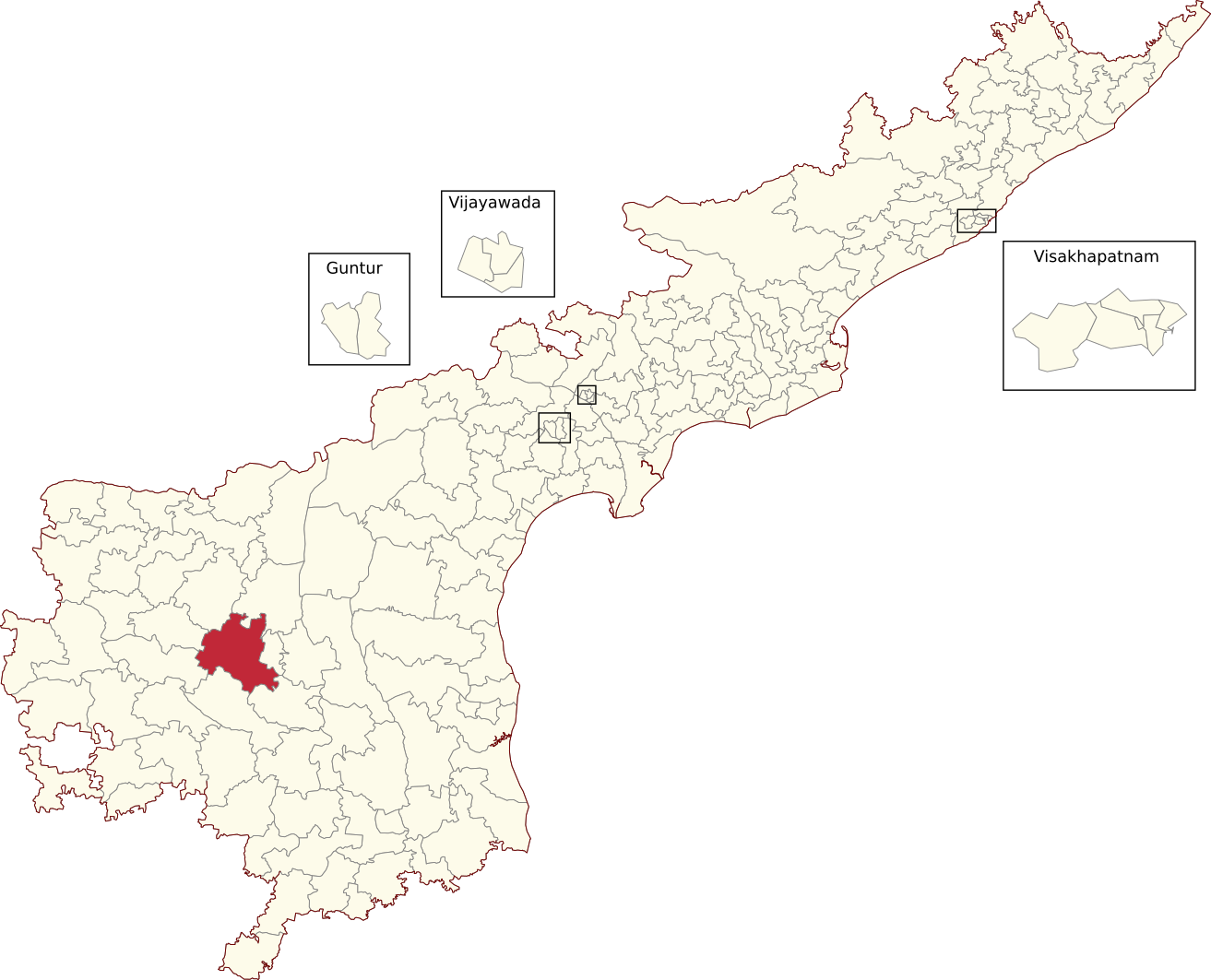
- Location of Jammalamadugu Assembly constituency within Andhra Pradesh

Constituency details
- Country: India
- Region: South India
- State: Andhra Pradesh
- District: YSR Kadapa
- Lok Sabha constituency: Kadapa
- Established: 1951
- Total electors: 237,577
- Reservation: None

Member of Legislative Assembly
- 16th Andhra Pradesh Legislative Assembly
- Incumbent Ch. Adinarayana Reddy
- Party: BJP
- Alliance: NDA
- Elected year: 2024

Jammalamadugu Assembly constituency is a constituency in YSR Kadapa district of Andhra Pradesh that elects representatives to the Andhra Pradesh Legislative Assembly in India. It is one of the seven assembly segments of Kadapa Lok Sabha constituency.

Ch. Adinarayana Reddy is the current MLA of the constituency, having won the 2024 Andhra Pradesh Legislative Assembly election from Bharatiya Janata Party. As of 25 March 2019, there are a total of 237,577 electors in the constituency. The constituency was established in 1951, as per the Delimitation Orders (1951).

== Mandals ==
Mandal
Peddamudium
Mylavaram
Kondapuram
Jammalamadugu
Muddanur
Yerraguntla

== Members of the Legislative Assembly ==
| Year | Member | Political party |
|---|---|---|
| 1952 | Kunda Ramiah | Kisan Mazdoor Praja Party |
| 1955 | Kunda Ramiah | Indian National Congress |
| 1962 | Thathireddi Narasimha Reddy | Indian National Congress |
| 1967 | Kunda Ramiah | Independent |
| 1972 | Thathireddi Narasimha Reddy | Independent |
| 1978 | Chavva Morammagari Ramanatha Reddy | Janata Party |
| 1983 | Ponnapureddy Siva Reddy | Telugu Desam Party |
| 1985 | Ponnapureddy Siva Reddy | Telugu Desam Party |
| 1989 | Ponnapureddy Siva Reddy | Telugu Desam Party |
| 1994 | Ponnapureddy Ramasubba Reddy | Telugu Desam Party |
| 1999 | Ponnapureddy Ramasubba Reddy | Telugu Desam Party |
| 2004 | Ch. Adinarayana Reddy | Indian National Congress |
| 2009 | Ch. Adinarayana Reddy | Indian National Congress |
| 2014 | Ch. Adinarayana Reddy | YSR Congress Party |
| 2019 | Mule Sudheer Reddy | YSR Congress Party |
| 2024 | Ch. Adinarayana Reddy | Bharatiya Janata Party |

== Election results ==
=== 1952 ===
1952 Madras Legislative Assembly election: Jammalamodugu
| Party | Candidate | Votes | % | ±% |
|---|---|---|---|---|
| KMPP | Kunda Ramiah | 32,056 | 58.86 | |
| INC | Tatireddi Pullareddy | 22,410 | 41.14 | 41.14 |
| Margin of victory | | 9,646 | 17.71 | |
| Turnout | | 54,466 | 69.97 | |
| Registered electors | | 77,840 | | |
| KMPP win (new seat) | | | | |

=== 2004 ===
2004 Andhra Pradesh Legislative Assembly election: Jammalamadugu
| Party | Candidate | Votes | % | ±% |
|---|---|---|---|---|
| INC | Ch. Adinarayana Reddy | 68,463 | 58.55 | +10.40 |
| TDP | Ramasubbareddy Ponnapureddy | 45,770 | 39.15 | −9.35 |
| Majority | | 22,693 | 19.40 | |
| Turnout | | 1,16,923 | 80.68 | +10.19 |
| INC gain from TDP | | Swing | | |

=== 2009 ===
2009 Andhra Pradesh Legislative Assembly election: Jammalamadugu
| Party | Candidate | Votes | % | ±% |
|---|---|---|---|---|
| INC | Ch. Adinarayana Reddy | 84,416 | 48.42 | −10.13 |
| TDP | Ramasubbareddy Ponnapureddy | 77,032 | 44.19 | +5.04 |
| PRP | Vongala Nagendra Yadav | 4,660 | 2.67 | |
| Majority | | 7,384 | 4.23 | |
| Turnout | | 1,74,338 | 84.40 | +3.72 |
| INC hold | | Swing | | |

=== 2014 ===
2014 Andhra Pradesh Legislative Assembly election: Jammalamadugu
| Party | Candidate | Votes | % | ±% |
|---|---|---|---|---|
| YSRCP | Ch. Adinarayana Reddy | 100,794 | 51.32 | |
| TDP | Ramasubbareddy Ponnapureddy | 88,627 | 45.12 | |
| Majority | | 12,167 | 6.20 | |
| Turnout | | 1,96,416 | 86.35 | +1.95 |
| YSRCP gain from INC | | Swing | | |

=== 2019 ===
2019 Andhra Pradesh Legislative Assembly election: Jammalamadugu
| Party | Candidate | Votes | % | ±% |
|---|---|---|---|---|
| YSRCP | Dr Mule Sudheer Reddy | 125,005 | 61.31 | +9.99 |
| TDP | Ramasubbareddy Ponnapureddy | 73,064 | 35.98 | −9.14 |
| Majority | | 51,941 | 25.60 | |
| Turnout | | 2,02,891 | 85.40 | |
| YSRCP hold | | Swing | | |

=== 2024 ===
2024 Andhra Pradesh Legislative Assembly election: Jammalamadugu
| Party | Candidate | Votes | % | ±% |
|---|---|---|---|---|
| BJP | Ch. Adinarayana Reddy | 109,640 | 51.43 | |
| YSRCP | Dr. Mule Sudheer Reddy | 92,449 | 43.37 | |
| INC | Brahmananda Reddy Pamula | 4,222 | 1.98 | |
| NOTA | None Of The Above | 2,392 | 1.12 | |
| Majority | | 17,191 | 8.06 | |
| Turnout | | 2,13,170 | | |
| BJP gain from YSRCP | | Swing | | |

== See also ==
- List of constituencies of Andhra Pradesh Legislative Assembly
