= State Highway 31 (Andhra Pradesh) =

Road in Andhra Pradesh, India

State Highway 31

Major junctions
- South end: Renigunta
- North end: Muddanur

Location
- Country: India
- State: Andhra Pradesh

Highway system
- Roads in India; Expressways; National; State; Asian; State Highways in Andhra Pradesh

State Highway 31 is a state highway in the Indian state of Andhra Pradesh which connects Renigunta and Muddanur in the state. It is the longest known state highway in Kadapa and Chittoor districts collectively.

== Route ==
It starts at visakhapatnam From there it passes through the visakhapatnam city, and ends in deomali. It spans over a distance of about 230 km.

The route is as following:

Visakhapatnam→Thagarapuvalasa→Viziayanagaram→Gajapathinagaram→Salur→Deomali

== See also ==
- List of state highways in Andhra Pradesh
