= Ontimitta railway station =

Railway station in Andhra Pradesh

Ontimitta

General information
- Location: Ontimitta, Kadapa district, Andhra Pradesh; India
- Coordinates: 14°23′33″N 79°00′59″E
- Elevation: 134 metres (440 ft)
- System: Indian Railways station
- Owner: Indian Railways
- Operator: South Coast Railway
- Line: Guntakal–Renigunta line
- Platforms: 2
- Tracks: Double Electric-Line

Construction
- Structure type: Standard (on ground)

Other information
- Status: Functioning
- Station code: VNM
- Zone(s): South Coast Railway zone
- Division(s): Guntakal

Services
Preceding station	Indian Railways	Following station
Bhakarapet towards ?	South Coast Railway zone Guntakal–Renigunta section	Mantapampalle towards ?
Location
- Interactive map

Ontimitta railway station is a railway station located on the Guntakal–Renigunta railway line operated by the South Coast Railway zone under Guntakal railway division. It is situated at Ontimitta in Kadapa district in the Indian state of Andhra Pradesh.
