= Pullaiah =

Pullaiah or Pullayya (Telugu: పుల్లయ్య) is an Indian name.

- Pullaiah Banjer is a village in Kalluru mandal, Khammam district in Andhra Pradesh, India
- C. Pullaiah (1898–1967), Indian film director
- Darur Pullaiah (fl. 1970s–1980s), Indian politician.
- P. Pullaiah (1911–1985), Indian film producer and director
- sollige.pullaiah (2004-), Founder of puli talks (youtube channel)
