= Kalamalla railway station =

Railway station in Andhra Pradesh

Kalamalla

General information
- Location: Chilamakuru-Potladutti Road, Kalamalla, Kadapa district, Andhra Pradesh; India
- Coordinates: 14°40′02″N 78°28′13″E
- Elevation: 179 metres (587 ft)
- System: Indian Railways station
- Owner: Indian Railways
- Operator: South Coast Railway
- Line: Guntakal–Renigunta line
- Platforms: 2
- Tracks: Double Electric-Line

Construction
- Structure type: Standard (on ground)

Other information
- Status: Functioning
- Station code: KMH
- Zone(s): South Coast Railway zone
- Division(s): Guntakal

Services
Preceding station	Indian Railways	Following station
Muddanuru towards ?	South Coast Railway zone Guntakal–Renigunta section	Yerraguntla Junction towards ?
Location
- Interactive map

Kalamalla railway station is a railway station located on the Guntakal–Renigunta railway line operated by the South Coast Railway zone under Guntakal railway division. It is situated beside Chilamakuru-Potladutti Road at Kalamalla at in Kadapa district in the Indian state of Andhra Pradesh.
