= Tadipatri railway station =

Railway station in Andhra Pradesh, India

Tadipatri
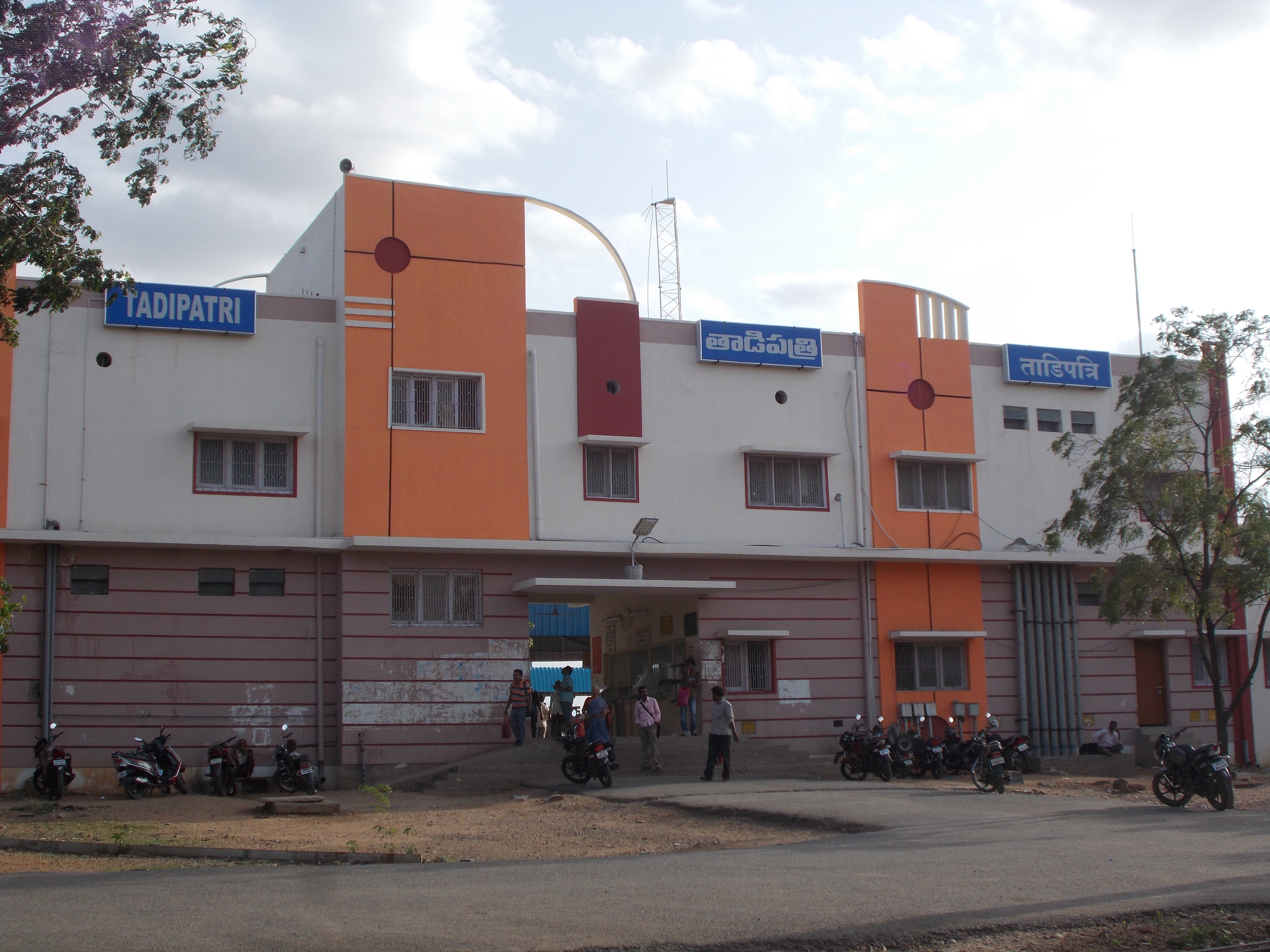
- Tadipatri railway station

General information
- Location: Nandalapadu, Tadipatri, Anantapur district, Andhra Pradesh; India
- Coordinates: 14°54′27″N 77°58′44″E
- Elevation: 237 metres (778 ft)
- System: Indian Railways station
- Owner: Indian Railways
- Operator: South Coast Railway
- Line: Guntakal–Renigunta line
- Platforms: 3
- Tracks: Double Electric-Line

Construction
- Structure type: Standard (on ground)

Other information
- Status: Functioning
- Station code: TU
- Zone(s): South Coast Railway zone
- Division(s): Guntakal

Services
Preceding station	Indian Railways	Following station
Komali towards ?	South Coast Railway zone Guntakal–Renigunta section	Challavaripalle towards ?
Location
- Interactive map

Tadipatri railway station is a railway station located on the Guntakal–Renigunta railway line operated by the South Coast Railway zone under Guntakal railway division. It is situated at Nandalapadu, Tadipatri in Anantapur district in the Indian state of Andhra Pradesh.
