= Krishnapuram railway station =

Railway station in Andhra Pradesh

Krishnapuram

General information
- Location: Krishnapuram, Kadapa district, Andhra Pradesh; India
- Coordinates: 14°29′36″N 78°46′36″E
- Elevation: 132 metres (433 ft)
- System: Indian Railways station
- Owner: Indian Railways
- Operator: South Coast Railway
- Line: Guntakal–Renigunta line
- Platforms: 3
- Tracks: Double Electric-Line

Construction
- Structure type: Standard (on ground)

Other information
- Status: Functioning
- Station code: KPU
- Zone(s): South Coast Railway zone
- Division(s): Guntakal

Services
| Preceding station | Indian Railways | Following station |
|---|---|---|
| Gangayapalle towards ? | South Coast Railway zone Guntakal–Renigunta section | Kadapa towards ? |
Location
- Interactive map

Krishnapuram railway station is a railway station located on the Guntakal–Renigunta railway line operated by the South Coast Railway zone under Guntakal railway division. It is situated at Krishnapuram in Kadapa district in the Indian state of Andhra Pradesh.
