= Regadipalli railway station =

Railway station in Andhra Pradesh

Regadipalli

General information
- Location: Regadipalli, Kadapa district, Andhra Pradesh; India
- Coordinates: 14°48′49″N 78°08′10″E
- Elevation: 223 metres (732 ft)
- System: Indian Railways station
- Owner: Indian Railways
- Operator: South Coast Railway
- Line: Guntakal–Renigunta line
- Platforms: 2
- Tracks: Double Electric-Line

Construction
- Structure type: Standard (on ground)

Other information
- Status: Functioning
- Station code: RLL
- Zone(s): South Coast Railway zone
- Division(s): Guntakal

Services
Preceding station	Indian Railways	Following station
Vanganur towards ?	South Coast Railway zone Guntakal–Renigunta section	Kondapuram towards ?
Location
- Interactive map

Regadipalli railway station is a railway station located on the Guntakal–Renigunta railway line operated by the South Coast Railway zone under Guntakal railway division. It is situated at Regadipalli in Kadapa district in the Indian state of Andhra Pradesh.
