= Patakottacheruvu railway station =

Railway station in Andhra Pradesh

Patakottacheruvu

General information
- Location: Pathakotha Cheruvu, Anantapur district, Andhra Pradesh; India
- Coordinates: 15°10′19″N 77°31′18″E
- Elevation: 379 metres (1,243 ft)
- System: Indian Railways station
- Owner: Indian Railways
- Operator: South Coast Railway
- Line: Guntakal–Renigunta line
- Platforms: 2
- Tracks: Double Electric-Line

Construction
- Structure type: Standard (on ground)

Other information
- Status: Functioning
- Station code: PLU
- Zone(s): South Coast Railway zone
- Division(s): Guntakal

Services
Preceding station	Indian Railways	Following station
Nakkanadoddi towards ?	South Coast Railway zone Guntakal–Renigunta section	Gooty Junction towards ?
Location
- Interactive map

Patakottacheruvu railway station is a railway station located on the Guntakal–Renigunta railway line operated by the South Coast Railway zone under Guntakal railway division. It is situated at Pathakotha Cheruvu in Anantapur district in the Indian state of Andhra Pradesh.
