= J. C. Diwakar Reddy =

Indian politician

J.C Diwakar Reddy
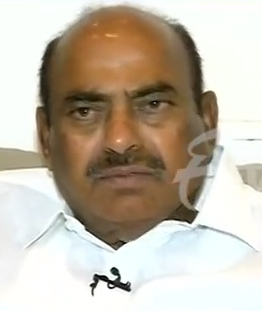
- J. C. Diwakar Reddy in 2018

Member of Parliament, Lok Sabha
- In office 16 May 2014 – 23 May 2019
- Preceded by: Anantha Venkatarami Reddy
- Succeeded by: Talari Rangaiah
- Constituency: Anantapur

Minister for Panchayat Raj Government of Andhra Pradesh
- In office 14 May 2004 – 20 May 2009
- Governor: Surjit Singh Barnala; Sushilkumar Shinde; Rameshwar Thakur; N. D. Tiwari
- Chief Minister: Y. S. Rajasekhara Reddy
- Preceded by: Veera Reddy Bijivemula
- Succeeded by: Botsa Satyanarayana

Member of Legislative Assembly Andhra Pradesh
- In office 1985–2014
- Preceded by: M. Kesava Reddy
- Succeeded by: J. C. Prabhakar Reddy
- Constituency: Tadipatri

Personal details
- Born: 23 February 1944 (age 82) Juturu, Pedda Pappur mandal, [Madras Presidency,British INDIA [Andhra Pradesh]]
- Party: Telugu Desam Party (since 2014)
- Other political affiliations: Indian National Congress (until 2014)
- Spouse: Smt Vijaya Reddy
- Children: 2 (son & daughter)
- Parents: J. C. Nagi Reddy (father); J. C. Naga Lakshmamma (mother)
- Relatives: J. C. Prabhakar Reddy (Brother); J. C. Ashmit Reddy (Nephew)
- Education: Karnatak University
- As of 7 December, 2016

J. C. Diwakar Reddy is a politician from Andhra Pradesh. He won the Anantapur seat in the 2014 Indian general election as a Telugu Desam Party candidate. J. C. Diwakar Reddy was born to J. C. Nagi Reddy in Juturu village, Peddapappur Mandal, Anantapur District (a well known politician and freedom fighter in Anantapur district).

== Political career ==
Diwakar Reddy won six consecutive terms as an MLA from the constituency in 1985, 1989, 1994, 1999, 2004 and 2009 from Tadipatri constituency in the Anantapur district. He was denied entry into the cabinet in 2009 and also later in N. Kiran Kumar Reddy’s ministry in 2010. He served as Pro tem Speaker in 2011 .

== Personal life ==
JC Reddy graduated with a Bachelor of Science degree. He has a son JC Pavan Reddy and a daughter.
