= Bhakarapet railway station =

Railway station in Andhra Pradesh

Bhakarapet

General information
- Location: Peddapalle, Bhakrapet, Kadapa district, Andhra Pradesh; India
- Coordinates: 14°24′34″N 78°58′12″E
- Elevation: 145 metres (476 ft)
- System: Indian Railways station
- Owner: Indian Railways
- Operator: South Coast Railway
- Line: Guntakal–Renigunta line
- Platforms: 2
- Tracks: Double Electric-Line

Construction
- Structure type: Standard (on ground)

Other information
- Status: Functioning
- Station code: BKPT
- Zone(s): South Coast Railway zone
- Division(s): Guntakal

Services
Preceding station	Indian Railways	Following station
Kanamalopalle towards ?	South Coast Railway zone Guntakal–Renigunta section	Ontimitta towards ?
Location
- Interactive map

Bhakarapet railway station is a railway station located on the Guntakal–Renigunta railway line operated by the South Coast Railway zone under Guntakal railway division. It is situated at Peddapalle, Bhakrapet in Kadapa district in the Indian state of Andhra Pradesh.
