= Gangayapalle railway station =

Railway station in Andhra Pradesh

Gangayapalle

General information
- Location: Koppolu, Gangayapalle, Kadapa district, Andhra Pradesh; India
- Coordinates: 14°33′15″N 78°43′03″E
- Elevation: 131 metres (430 ft)
- System: Indian Railways station
- Owner: Indian Railways
- Operator: South Coast Railway
- Line: Guntakal–Renigunta line
- Platforms: 3
- Tracks: Double Electric-Line

Construction
- Structure type: Standard (on ground)

Other information
- Status: Functioning
- Station code: GPY
- Zone(s): South Coast Railway zone
- Division(s): Guntakal

Services
| Preceding station | Indian Railways | Following station |
|---|---|---|
| Kamalapuram towards ? | South Coast Railway zone Guntakal–Renigunta section | Krishnapuram towards ? |
Location
- Interactive map

Gangayapalle railway station is a railway station located on the Guntakal–Renigunta railway line operated by the South Coast Railway zone under Guntakal railway division. It is situated at Koppolu, Gangayapalle in Kadapa district in the Indian state of Andhra Pradesh.
