= Kapu Ramachandra Reddy =

Indian politician

Kapu Ramachandra Reddy (born 1969) is an Indian politician from Andhra Pradesh. He was elected as MLA in 2009, 2012 and 2019 from Rayadurg Assembly constituency in Anantapur district. He was elected as MLA of Rayadurg 3 times and served as Whip to the Government of Andhra Pradesh.

== Early life and education ==
Kapu Ramachandra Reddy was born in Nagireddy Palle village of Bramhasamudram mandal of Ananthapuram district to Kapu Chinna Thimmappa. He completed his M.Com. from Karnataka University. Later, he did M.L.I.Sc. in 1991 and LLB (Spl) in 1994 from Ballari College affiliated to Gulbarga University. He is an advocate and also has his own business.

== Career ==
Reddy started his political career with Indian National Congress in 2009. He won the 2009 Andhra Pradesh Legislative Assembly election from Rayadurg Assembly constituency representing Indian National Congress. He defeated Mettu Govinda Reddy of Telugu Desam Party by a margin of 14,091 votes. He later won the 2012 Andhra Pradesh by-elections and also regained his seat in the 2019 Andhra Pradesh Legislative Assembly election. He lost the seat in 2014 to Kalava Srinivasulu by a narrow margin of 1,827 votes but defeated him in the next election by a huge margin of 14,049 votes in 2019 Andhra Pradesh Legislative Assembly election. He quit YSRCP after he was denied a ticket to contest the 2024 Assembly election and joined BJP. In January, there were rumours that he would join Congress but he later joined BJP.
