= Mantapampalle =

- village
- Interactive map of Mantapampalle
- Location in Andhra Pradesh, India Mantapampalle (India)
- Coordinates: 14.322251°N 79.078707°E
- Country: India
- State: Andhra Pradesh

Languages
  - Official: Telugu
- Time zone: UTC+5:30 (IST)

Mantapamapalle is a village in Vontimitta mandal of Kadapa district of Andhra Pradesh, India.

== Transportation ==
Mantapampalle railway station is the nearest railway connection located on the Guntakal–Renigunta railway line operated by the South Coast Railway zone under Guntakal railway division.
