= Kondapuram railway station =

Railway station in Andhra Pradesh

Kondapuram

General information
- Location: Kondapuram, Kadapa district, Kadapa district, Andhra Pradesh; India
- Coordinates: 14°46′25″N 78°11′36″E
- Elevation: 225 metres (738 ft)
- System: Indian Railways station
- Owner: Indian Railways
- Operator: South Coast Railway
- Line: Guntakal–Renigunta line
- Platforms: 2
- Tracks: Double Electric-Line

Construction
- Structure type: Standard (on ground)

Other information
- Status: Functioning
- Station code: KDP
- Zone(s): South Coast Railway zone
- Division(s): Guntakal

Services
Preceding station	Indian Railways	Following station
Regadipalli towards ?	South Coast Railway zone Guntakal–Renigunta section	Mangapatnam towards ?
Location
- Interactive map

Kondapuram railway station is a railway station located on the Guntakal–Renigunta railway line operated by the South Coast Railway zone under Guntakal railway division. It is situated at Kondapuram, Kadapa district in Kadapa district in the Indian state of Andhra Pradesh.
