= Komali railway station =

Railway station in Andhra Pradesh

Komali

General information
- Location: Komali, Tadipatri Mandal, Anantapur district, Andhra Pradesh; India
- Coordinates: 14°56′11″N 77°55′39″E
- Elevation: 248 metres (814 ft)
- System: Indian Railways station
- Owner: Indian Railways
- Operator: South Coast Railway
- Line: Guntakal–Renigunta line
- Platforms: 2
- Tracks: Double Electric-Line

Construction
- Structure type: Standard (on ground)

Other information
- Status: Functioning
- Station code: KMQA
- Zone(s): South Coast Railway zone
- Division(s): Guntakal

Services
| Preceding station | Indian Railways | Following station |
|---|---|---|
| Juturu towards ? | South Coast Railway zone Guntakal–Renigunta section | Tadipatri towards ? |
Location
- Interactive map

Komali railway station is a railway station located on the Guntakal–Renigunta railway line operated by the South Coast Railway zone under Guntakal railway division. It is situated at Komali, Tadipatri Mandal in Anantapur district in the Indian state of Andhra Pradesh.
