= Jakkalacheruvu railway station =

Railway station in Andhra Pradesh

Jakkalacheruvu

General information
- Location: Jakkalacheruvu, Roddam Mandal, Anantapur district, Andhra Pradesh; India
- Coordinates: 15°06′33″N 77°43′37″E
- Elevation: 334 metres (1,096 ft)
- System: Indian Railways station
- Owner: Indian Railways
- Operator: South Coast Railway
- Line: Guntakal–Renigunta line
- Platforms: 2
- Tracks: Double Electric-Line

Construction
- Structure type: Standard (on ground)

Other information
- Status: Functioning
- Station code: JKO
- Zone(s): South Coast Railway zone
- Division(s): Guntakal

Services
Preceding station	Indian Railways	Following station
Gooty Junction towards ?	South Coast Railway zone Guntakal–Renigunta section	Rayalacheruvu towards ?
Location
- Interactive map

Jakkalacheruvu railway station is a railway station located on the Guntakal–Renigunta railway line operated by the South Coast Railway zone under Guntakal railway division. It is situated at Jakkalacheruvu, Roddam Mandal in Anantapur district in the Indian state of Andhra Pradesh.
