= Vanganur railway station =

Railway station in Andhra Pradesh

Vanganur

General information
- Location: Konavaripalli-Vanganur Road, Vanganur, Anantapur district, Andhra Pradesh; India
- Coordinates: 14°50′51″N 78°04′51″E
- Elevation: 223 metres (732 ft)
- System: Indian Railways station
- Owner: Indian Railways
- Operator: South Coast Railway
- Line: Guntakal–Renigunta line
- Platforms: 2
- Tracks: Double Electric-Line

Construction
- Structure type: Standard (on ground)

Other information
- Status: Functioning
- Station code: VRN
- Zone(s): South Coast Railway zone
- Division(s): Guntakal

Services
Preceding station	Indian Railways	Following station
Challavaripalle towards ?	South Coast Railway zone Guntakal–Renigunta section	Regadipalli towards ?
Location
- Interactive map

Vanganur railway station is a railway station located on the Guntakal–Renigunta railway line operated by the South Coast Railway zone under Guntakal railway division. It is situated beside Konavaripalli-Vanganur Road at Vanganur in Anantapur district in the Indian state of Andhra Pradesh.
