= Rayalacheruvu railway station =

Railway station in Andhra Pradesh

Rayalacheruvu

General information
- Location: Rayalacheruvu, Anantapur district, Andhra Pradesh; India
- Coordinates: 15°03′21″N 77°49′16″E
- Elevation: 292 metres (958 ft)
- System: Indian Railways station
- Owner: Indian Railways
- Operator: South Coast Railway
- Line: Guntakal–Renigunta line
- Platforms: 2
- Tracks: Double Electric-Line

Construction
- Structure type: Standard (on ground)

Other information
- Status: Functioning
- Station code: RLO
- Zone(s): South Coast Railway zone
- Division(s): Guntakal

Services
Preceding station	Indian Railways	Following station
Jakkalacheruvu towards ?	South Coast Railway zone Guntakal–Renigunta section	Vemulapadu towards ?
Location
- Interactive map

Rayalacheruvu railway station is a railway station located on the Guntakal–Renigunta railway line operated by the South Coast Railway zone under Guntakal railway division. It is situated at Rayalacheruvu in Anantapur district in the Indian state of Andhra Pradesh.
