= Muddanuru railway station =

Railway station in Andhra Pradesh, India

Muddanuru
- Muddanuru station

General information
- Location: Muddanur, Kadapa district, Andhra Pradesh; India
- Coordinates: 14°41′18″N 78°23′43″E
- Elevation: 191 metres (627 ft)
- System: Indian Railways station
- Owner: Indian Railways
- Operator: South Coast Railway
- Line: Guntakal–Renigunta line
- Platforms: 3
- Tracks: Double Electric-Line

Construction
- Structure type: Standard (on ground)

Other information
- Status: Functioning
- Station code: MOO
- Zone(s): South Coast Railway zone
- Division(s): Guntakal

Services
Preceding station	Indian Railways	Following station
Mangapatnam towards ?	South Coast Railway zone Guntakal–Renigunta section	Kalamalla towards ?
Location
- Interactive map

Muddanuru railway station is a railway station located on the Guntakal–Renigunta railway line operated by the South Coast Railway zone under Guntakal railway division. It is situated at Muddanur in Kadapa district in the Indian state of Andhra Pradesh.
