= Juturu railway station =

Railway station in Andhra Pradesh

Juturu

General information
- Location: Nithur-Miduthur Road, Kummetha, Anantapur district, Andhra Pradesh; India
- Coordinates: 14°58′44″N 77°53′53″E
- Elevation: 261 metres (856 ft)
- System: Indian Railways station
- Owner: Indian Railways
- Operator: South Coast Railway
- Line: Guntakal–Renigunta line
- Platforms: 2
- Tracks: Double Electric-Line

Construction
- Structure type: Standard (on ground)

Other information
- Status: Functioning
- Station code: JUR
- Zone(s): South Coast Railway zone
- Division(s): Guntakal

Services
Preceding station	Indian Railways	Following station
Vemulapadu towards ?	South Coast Railway zone Guntakal–Renigunta section	Komali towards ?
Location
- Interactive map

Juturu railway station is a railway station located on the Guntakal–Renigunta railway line operated by the South Coast Railway zone under Guntakal railway division. It is situated beside Nithur-Miduthur Road at Kummetha in Anantapur district in the Indian state of Andhra Pradesh.
