= Mule Sudheer Reddy =

Indian politician

Member of Legislative Assembly Andhra Pradesh
- In office 23 May 2019 – 4 June 2024
- Preceded by: C. Adinarayana Reddy
- Succeeded by: C. Adinarayana Reddy
- Constituency: Jammalamadugu

Personal details
- Born: 12 March 1985 (age 41) Nidijuvvi, Yerraguntla, YSR district, Andhra Pradesh
- Party: YSR Congress Party
- Parent: Mule Venkata Subba Reddy (father)
- Relatives: M. V. Mysura Reddy (Uncle); Kethireddy Venkatarami Reddy (brother-in-law); Kethireddy Pedda Reddy (uncle-in-law)
- Education: MBBS
- Alma mater: Adichunchanagiri Institute of Medical Sciences, Karnataka

Mule Sudheer Reddy (born 1985) is an Indian politician from Andhra Pradesh. He is an MLA of YSR Congress Party from Jammalamadugu Assembly constituency in Kadapa district. He won the 2019 Andhra Pradesh Legislative Assembly Election.

== Early life and education ==
Reddy was born in Nidijivi village of Yerraguntla mandal, Kadapa district. His father's name is Mule Venkata Subba Reddy. He completed his MBBS in 2004 from Adichunchangiri Institute of Medical Sciences, Mandya district, Karnataka. Later, he did a two-year diploma in Anesthesia. He is a nephew of former minister M. V. Mysoora Reddy.

== Career ==
Reddy started his political career with Indian National Congress but joined YSR Congress Party when it started in 2011. He was first elected as MLA in the 2019 Andhra Pradesh Legislative Assembly election on YSRCP ticket from Jammalamadugu defeating Ponnapureddy Rama Subba Reddy of Telugu Desam Party by a margin of 51,641 votes.
