= Mantapampalle railway station =

Railway station in Andhra Pradesh, India

Mantapampalle

General information
- Location: Kadapa-Tirupati Road, Mantapampalle, Kadapa district, Andhra Pradesh; India
- Coordinates: 14°19′18″N 79°04′43″E
- Elevation: 155 metres (509 ft)
- System: Indian Railways station
- Owner: Indian Railways
- Operator: South Coast Railway
- Line: Guntakal–Renigunta line
- Platforms: 2
- Tracks: Double Electric-Line

Construction
- Structure type: Standard (on ground)

Other information
- Status: Functioning
- Station code: MMPL
- Zone(s): South Coast Railway zone
- Division(s): Guntakal

Services
Preceding station	Indian Railways	Following station
Ontimitta towards ?	South Coast Railway zone Guntakal–Renigunta section	Nandalur towards ?
Location
- Interactive map

Mantapampalle railway station is a railway station located on the Guntakal–Renigunta railway line operated by the South Coast Railway zone under Guntakal railway division. It is situated beside Kadapa-Tirupati Road at Mantapampalle in Kadapa district in the Indian state of Andhra Pradesh.
