= Timmanacherla railway station =

Railway station in Andhra Pradesh

Timmanacherla

General information
- Location: Rajendra Nagar, Guntakal, Anantapur district, Andhra Pradesh; India
- Coordinates: 15°09′48″N 77°23′39″E
- Elevation: 434 metres (1,424 ft)
- System: Indian Railways station
- Owner: Indian Railways
- Operator: South Coast Railway
- Line: Guntakal–Renigunta line
- Platforms: 2
- Tracks: Double Electric-Line

Construction
- Structure type: Standard (on ground)

Other information
- Status: Functioning
- Station code: TIM
- Zone(s): South Coast Railway zone
- Division(s): Guntakal

Services
Preceding station	Indian Railways	Following station
Guntakal Junction towards ?	South Coast Railway zone Guntakal–Renigunta section	Nakkanadoddi towards ?
Location
- Interactive map

Timmanacherla railway station is a railway station located on the Guntakal–Renigunta railway line operated by the South Coast Railway zone under Guntakal railway division. It is situated at Rajendra Nagar, Guntakal in Anantapur district in the Indian state of Andhra Pradesh.
