= Talari Rangaiah =

Indian politician (born 1970)

Member of Parliament, Lok Sabha
- In office 2019–2024
- Preceded by: J. C. Diwakar Reddy
- Succeeded by: Ambica G Lakshminarayana Valmiki
- Constituency: Anantapur, Andhra Pradesh

Personal details
- Born: 3 June 1970 (age 56) Gosupadu, Nandyal, Andhra Pradesh, India
- Party: YSR Congress Party
- Spouse: Talari Usha
- Occupation: Politician

Talari Rangaiah (born 3 June 1970) is an Indian politician who served as a Member of Parliament in the Lok Sabha, representing the Anantapur constituency from 2019 to 2024. Before entering politics, he worked as a project Director at the District Rural Development Agency (DRDA). He has been a member of the YSR Congress Party since 2018.

== Career ==
Rangaiah was born on June 3, 1970 into a farming family in the Boya community from Andhra Pradesh. He obtained a master's degree in education and was later hired by the DRDA in 2009 as a project director.

Rangaiah worked as Municipal Commisisoner in Anantapur Municipal Corporation and Hindupur Municipality. In 2017, Rangaiah retired from his post as Additional Director in the Handloom Department of DRDA.

In the 2019 Indian general election, Rangaiah was elected to the 17th Lok Sabha as a Member of Parliament representing the Anantapur constituency, winning by a margin of 695,208 votes.

In 2020, he published an academic paper on the causes of rural labor migration in the North Asian International Research Journal.
