= Vemulapadu railway station =

Railway station in Andhra Pradesh

Vemulapadu

General information
- Location: Vemulapadu, Anantapur district, Andhra Pradesh; India
- Coordinates: 15°01′20″N 77°51′05″E
- Elevation: 271 metres (889 ft)
- System: Indian Railways station
- Owner: Indian Railways
- Operator: South Coast Railway
- Line: Guntakal–Renigunta line
- Platforms: 2
- Tracks: Double Electric-Line

Construction
- Structure type: Standard (on ground)

Other information
- Status: Functioning
- Station code: VML
- Zone(s): South Coast Railway zone
- Division(s): Guntakal

Services
Preceding station	Indian Railways	Following station
Rayalacheruvu towards ?	South Coast Railway zone Guntakal–Renigunta section	Juturu towards ?
Location
- Interactive map

Vemulapadu railway station is a railway station located on the Guntakal–Renigunta railway line operated by the South Coast Railway zone under Guntakal railway division. It is situated at Vemulapadu in Anantapur district in the Indian state of Andhra Pradesh.
