= G. Lakshminarayana =

Indian politician

Ambica Lakshminarayana

Member of Parliament, Lok Sabha
- Incumbent
- Assumed office 2024
- Preceded by: Talari Rangaiah
- Constituency: Anantapur

Personal details
- Party: Telugu Desam Party
- Occupation: Politician

G. Lakshminarayana commonly known as Ambica Lakshminarayana is an Indian politician and the elected candidate for Lok Sabha from Anantapur Lok Sabha constituency. He is a member of the Telugu Desam Party.

== See also ==
- 18th Lok Sabha
- Telugu Desam Party
- Anantapur Lok Sabha constituency
