= Thiriveedi Jayaramulu =

Indian politician (born 1959)

Thiriveedi Jayaramulu (born 1959) is an Indian politician from Andhra Pradesh. He was a former two time member of the Andhra Pradesh Legislative Assembly from Badvel Assembly constituency, which is reserved for Scheduled Caste community, in Kadapa district representing the YSR Congress Party.

== Early life ==
Jayaramulu is from Badvel, Kadapa district, Andhra Pradesh. He is the son of Raghuramulu. He retired as a Municipal Commissioner. His wife was a nurse. He completed his B.Sc at Dr. B.R.A.O. University in 1991 and MA in 1992 at Osmania University. Later did BL at SV University in 1997. He declared assets worth Rs.1 crore in his affidavit to the Election Commission of India.

== Career ==
Jayaramulu won from Badvel Assembly constituency in the 2014 Andhra Pradesh Legislative Assembly election representing the YSR Congress Party. He polled 78,879 votes and defeated his nearest rival, N. D. Vijaya Jyothi of the Telugu Desam Party, by a margin of 10,079 votes. In February 2016, he joined Telugu Desam Party.
