= Dasari Sudha =

Indian politician

Member of Andhra Pradesh Legislative Assembly
- Incumbent
- Assumed office 2 November 2021
- Preceded by: Gunthoti Venkata Subbaiah
- Constituency: Badvel

Personal details
- Party: YSR Congress Party
- Spouse: Gunthoti Venkata Subbaiah
- Children: One Daughter & One Son
- Education: MBBS
- Alma mater: Kurnool Medical College
- Profession: Gynecologist

Dasari Sudha (born 1970) is an Indian politician from Andhra Pradesh. She is a member of the Andhra Pradesh Legislative Assembly. She won from Badvel Assembly constituency in the 2024 Andhra Pradesh Legislative Assembly election representing YSR Congress Party.

== Early life and education ==
Sudha is from Badvel, Kadapa district. Her late husband Gunthoti Venkata Subbaiah was also an MLA. They have a daughter and a son. She completed her MBBS in 1999 from Kurnool Medical College.

== Career ==
Sudha first became an MLA in the 2021 Andhra Pradesh Assembly by-election for Badvel which was necessitated after her husband Gunthoti Venkata Subbaiah died of ill-health in 2021. She defeated Panathala Suresh of Bharatiya Janata Party by a huge margin of 90,533 votes. She retained the seat in the 2024 Andhra Pradesh Legislative Assembly election defeating Bojja Roshanna despite a wave in favour of TDP-BJP-JSP alliance. She polled 90,410 votes and won by a margin of 18,567 votes.
