= V. Prabhakar Chowdary =

Indian politician

Vykuntam Prabhakar Chowdary

Member of the Andhra Pradesh Legislative Assembly
- In office 2014–2019
- Chief Minister: N. Chandrababu Naidu
- Preceded by: Bodimalla Gurunatha Reddy
- Succeeded by: Anantha Venkatarami Reddy
- Constituency: Anantapur Urban

Personal details
- Party: Telugu Desam Party

Vykuntam Prabhakar Chowdary is an Indian politician and a Member of Legislative Assembly from Anantapur, Andhra Pradesh, first elected in 2014. He is a member of the Telugu Desam Party.

== Biography ==
He was the senior leader of Telugu Desam Party. He was a Municipal Chairman for Anantapur from 1995 -2000. He worked as Telugu Desam Party constituency Incharge for Anantapur Urban Assembly constituency. He contested as MLA candidate in 1999 the constituency Anantapur Urban from Telugu Desam Party. Also he contested as Independent MLA candidate in 2004 the constituency Anantapur Urban elected in 2014 at the assembly general elections from the Anantapur Urban constituency in Anantapur district. He later served as Member of the Legislative Assembly. In 2019 he contested from Anantapur Urban constituency and he lost in 2019 General Elections and now he is working as TDP constituency Incharge for Anantapur Urban Assembly constituency.

He along with Nara Chandra Babu Naidu worked in Andhra Pradesh Legislative Assembly.

Vykuntam Prabhakar Chowdary is the chairman AWAY (Avoid Wildness and Yeastiness), a social and non-political organization India.
