= Tadpatri Assembly constituency =

Constituency of the Andhra Pradesh Legislative Assembly, India

Coordinates: 14.91°N 78.00°E

Tadpatri
- Constituency No. 151 for the Andhra Pradesh Legislative Assembly
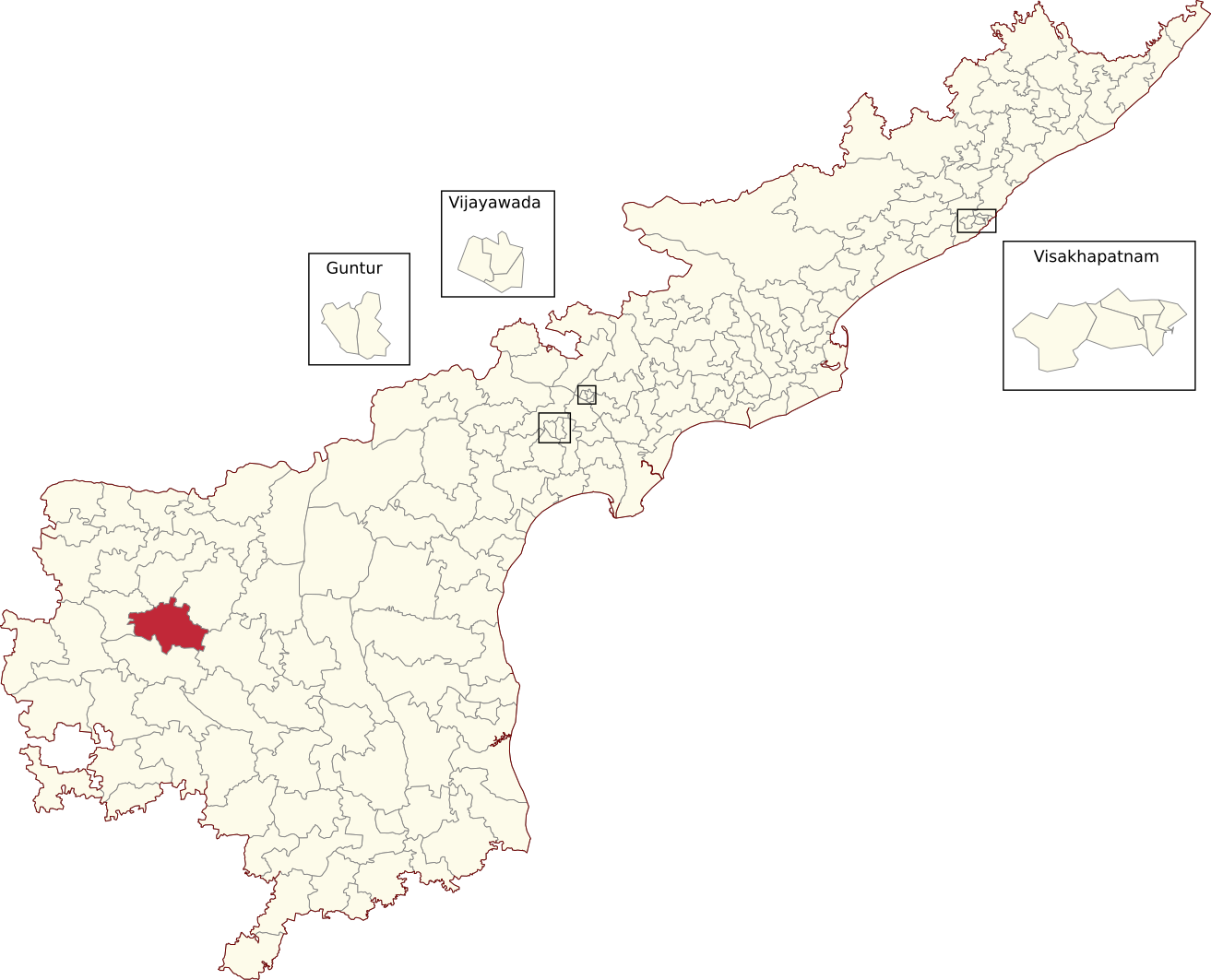
- Location of Tadpatri Assembly constituency within Andhra Pradesh

Constituency details
- Country: India
- Region: South India
- State: Andhra Pradesh
- District: Anantapur
- Lok Sabha constituency: Anantapur
- Established: 1951
- Total electors: 334,741
- Reservation: None

Member of Legislative Assembly
- 16th Andhra Pradesh Legislative Assembly
- Incumbent J.C. Asmit Reddy
- Party: TDP
- Alliance: NDA
- Elected year: 2024

Tadpatri Assembly constituency is a constituency in Anantapur district of Andhra Pradesh that elects representatives to the Andhra Pradesh Legislative Assembly in India. It is one of the seven assembly segments of Anantapur Lok Sabha constituency.

J.C. Asmit Reddy is the current MLA of the constituency, having won the 2024 Andhra Pradesh Legislative Assembly election from Telugu Desam Party. As of 2019, there are a total of 334,741 electors in the constituency. The constituency was established in 1951, as per the Delimitation Orders (1951).

== Mandals ==
Mandal
Peddavadugur
Yadiki
Tadpatri
Peddapappur

== Members of the Legislative Assembly ==
Year	Member	Political party
1952	Challa Subbarayudu	Kisan Mazdoor Praja Party
1955	Challa Subbarayudu	Indian National Congress
1962	C. Kulasekhara Reddy	Independent
1967	Challa Subbarayudu	Indian National Congress
1972	Challa Subbarayudu	Indian National Congress
1978	Diddekunta Venkata Reddy	Indian National Congress
1983	M. Kesava Reddy	Telugu Desam Party
1985	J. C. Diwakar Reddy	Indian National Congress
1989	J. C. Diwakar Reddy	Indian National Congress
1994	J. C. Diwakar Reddy	Indian National Congress
1999	J. C. Diwakar Reddy	Indian National Congress
2004	J. C. Diwakar Reddy	Indian National Congress
2009	J. C. Diwakar Reddy	Indian National Congress
2014	J. C. Prabhakar Reddy	Telugu Desam Party
2019	Kethireddy Pedda Reddy	YSR Congress Party
2024	J.C. Asmit Reddy	Telugu Desam Party

== Election results ==
=== 2024 ===
2024 Andhra Pradesh Legislative Assembly election: Tadpatri
Party	Candidate	Votes	%	±%
TDP	J.C. Asmit Reddy	113,755	54.77	
YSRCP	Kethireddy Pedda Reddy	86024	41.42	
INC	Gujjala Nagi Reddy	2,628	1.27	
NOTA	None Of The Above	1,000	0.48	
Majority		27,731	13.35	
Turnout		2,07,679		
TDP gain from YSRCP		Swing		

=== 2019 ===
2019 Andhra Pradesh Legislative Assembly election: Tadpatri
Party	Candidate	Votes	%	±%
YSRCP	Kethireddy Pedda Reddy	92,000	49.45	
TDP	J.C. Asmit Reddy	85,400	45.46	
Majority		7,533	3.99	
Turnout		1,87,874		
YSRCP gain from TDP		Swing		

=== 2014 ===
2014 Andhra Pradesh Legislative Assembly election: Tadipatri
Party	Candidate	Votes	%	±%
TDP	J. C. Prabhakar Reddy	96,740	53.76	
YSRCP	V. R. Rami Reddy	74,568	41.44	
STR	T. Kuladeep Chowdary	1,688	0.94	
INC	Ambati Viswantha Reddy	1,411	0.78	
JSP	Cherukuri Venkataramana	1,374	0.76	
NOTA	None of the Above	1,213	0.67	
Majority		22,172	12.32	
Turnout		179,934	79.74	
TDP hold		Swing		

=== 2009 ===
2009 Andhra Pradesh Legislative Assembly election: Tadpatri
Party	Candidate	Votes	%	±%
INC	J. C. Diwakar Reddy	63,358	42.17	+9.15
TDP	Peram Nagi Reddy	56,403	37.54	−7.68
PRP	Pyla Narasimhaiah	19,718	13.12	
Majority		6,955	4.63	
Turnout		150,252	74.08	+7.87
INC hold		Swing		

=== 2004 ===
2004 Andhra Pradesh Legislative Assembly election: Tadpatri
Party	Candidate	Votes	%	±%
INC	J. C. Diwakar Reddy	66,195	51.32	+0.31
TDP	Kethireddy Suryaprathapa Reddy	58,318	45.22	−1.78
Majority		7,877	6.10	
Turnout		128,977	66.21	+8.26
INC hold		Swing		

=== 1952 ===
1952 Madras Legislative Assembly election: Tadpatri
Party	Candidate	Votes	%	±%
KMPP	C. Subbarayudu	16,868	38.00%	
INC	J. C. Nagi Reddi	15,455	34.82%	34.82%
Independent	Kulasekara Reddi	12,065	27.18%	
Margin of victory		1,412	3.18%	
Turnout		44,388	63.99%	
Registered electors		69,367		
KMPP win (new seat)				

== See also ==
- List of constituencies of Andhra Pradesh Legislative Assembly
