= Kalava Srinivasulu =

Indian politician

Minister of Rural Housing, Information & Public Relations Government of Andhra Pradesh
- In office 8 June 2014 – 29 May 2019
- Governor: E. S. L. Narasimhan
- Chief Minister: N. Chandrababu Naidu
- Preceded by: D. K. Aruna (Information & Public Relations); Nalamada Uttam Kumar Reddy (Housing)
- Succeeded by: Perni Nani (Information & Public Relations); Cherukuvada Sri Ranganadha Raju (Housing)

Member of Legislative Assembly Andhra Pradesh
- Incumbent
- Assumed office 2024
- Preceded by: Kapu Ramachandra Reddy
- Constituency: Rayadurg
- In office 2014 - 2019
- Preceded by: Kapu Ramachandra Reddy
- Succeeded by: Kapu Ramachandra Reddy
- Constituency: Rayadurg

Member of Parliament, Lok Sabha
- In office 1999–2004
- Preceded by: Anantha Venkatarami Reddy
- Succeeded by: Anantha Venkatarami Reddy
- Constituency: Anantapur

Personal details
- Born: 1 July 1964 (age 61)
- Citizenship: India
- Party: Telugu Desam Party
- Spouse: Smt. K. Vijaya Lakshmi
- Children: 2
- Parent: Late Sri K. Bala Venkata Swamy (father) Smt. K. Pullamma (mother)
- Occupation: Politician
- Website: www.kalavasrinivasulu.com

Kalava Srinivasulu is an Indian politician and a member of Legislative Assembly elected from Rayadurg Constituency of Anantapur District, Andhra Pradesh state. He is the Cabinet Minister for Rural Housing and Information and Public Relations in Andhra Pradesh. He has been serving as Politburo Member of Telugu Desam Party since June 2004.

Previously, he was member of parliament from 1999 to 2004.

Previously, he was the chief whip of Telugu Desam Party's government, Andhra Pradesh.

== Biography ==
=== Early life ===
Srinivasulu was born on 1 June 1964 in an agricultural family. He pursued Diploma in Journalism from Eenadu School of Journalism, Hyderabad and went on to receive his Master's degree in Arts, specializing in sociology.

=== Personal life ===
Srinivasulu married Smt. Vijaya Lakshmi. He is the father of a son and a daughter.

=== Profession ===
Politician, social activist, agriculturist. In addition to that, he served as a Journalist in Eenadu for more than 14 years and played a major role in highlighting many issues related to the drought conditions of Ananthapuramu District.

=== Political career ===
Srinivasulu joined Telugu Desam Party in 1999. He was elected to 13th Lok Sabha in 1999 and rendered services as an M.P. from 1999 to 2004 from TDP. He, then, in 2014 contested as MLA from Rayadurg constituency of Anantapur district and won the election by narrow margin of just 1800 votes.

=== Positions held ===
1. Elected to 13th Lok Sabha in 1999 and rendered services as an MP from 1999 to 2004.
2. Served as General Secretary, Telugu Desam Party from May 2000 to May 2003.
3. Served as a Member of Disciplinary Committee, Telugu Desam Party from June 2003 to May 2004.
4. Has been serving as Politburo Member of Telugu Desam Party since June 2004.
5. Govt. Chief Whip, Andhra Pradesh Legislative Assembly, Hyderabad

=== Committees represented ===
1. Served as a Member, Parliamentary Standing Committee on Transport & Tourism.
2. Served as a Member, Parliamentary Consultative Committee on Agriculture.
3. Served as a Member, Central Silk Board from 2000 to 2004.
4. Served as a Member, Telugu Desam Party High Power Committee on framing of New Economic Policies.
5. Served as a Member, Telugu Desam Party Election Manifesto Committee for the General Elections in 2004, 2009 and 2014.
