= Gunthoti Venkata Subbaiah =

Indian politician (died 2021)

Member of Andhra Pradesh Legislative Assembly
- In office 2019–2021
- Preceded by: Thiriveedi Jayaramulu
- Succeeded by: Dasari Sudha
- Constituency: Badvel

Personal details
- Died: 28 March 2021 (aged 62) Kadapa, Andhra Pradesh
- Party: YSR Congress Party
- Spouse: Dasari Sudha
- Children: One Daughter & One Son
- Education: Master of Surgery in Orthopedics,
- Alma mater: S. V. Medical College
- Profession: Orthopedic Surgeon

Gunthoti Venkata Subbaiah was an Indian politician from YSR Congress Party. He was elected as a member of the Andhra Pradesh Legislative Assembly from Badvel. On March 28, 2021, Venkata Subbaiah died in a private hospital at Kadapa after suffering from protracted illness for a long time.
