= Anantha Venkatarami Reddy =

Indian politician

Member of Legislative Assembly Andhra Pradesh
- In office 2019–2024
- Preceded by: V. Prabhakar Chowdary
- Succeeded by: Daggubati Venkateswara Prasad
- Constituency: Anantapur Urban

Member of Parliament, Lok Sabha
- In office 2004–2014
- Preceded by: Kalava Srinivasulu
- Succeeded by: J. C. Diwakar Reddy
- Constituency: Anantapur
- In office 1996–1999
- Preceded by: Anantha Venkata Reddy
- Succeeded by: Kalava Srinivasulu
- Constituency: Anantapur

Personal details
- Born: 1 August 1956 (age 69) Tadipatri, Andhra Pradesh
- Party: YSR Congress Party
- Spouse: A. Rama
- Children: 2 daughters
- As of 16 September, 2006 Source: []

Anantha Venkatarami Reddy (born 1 August 1956) has been a member of the 11th, 12th, 14th and 15th Lok Sabha of India. He represents the Anantapur constituency of Andhra Pradesh and is a member of the Indian National Congress up to March 2014, when he joined YSRCP. He contested as a member of the Legislative Assembly from the Anantapur Urban constituency in 2019 and won.
