= Kondapuram, Kadapa district =

Kondapuram
- Village
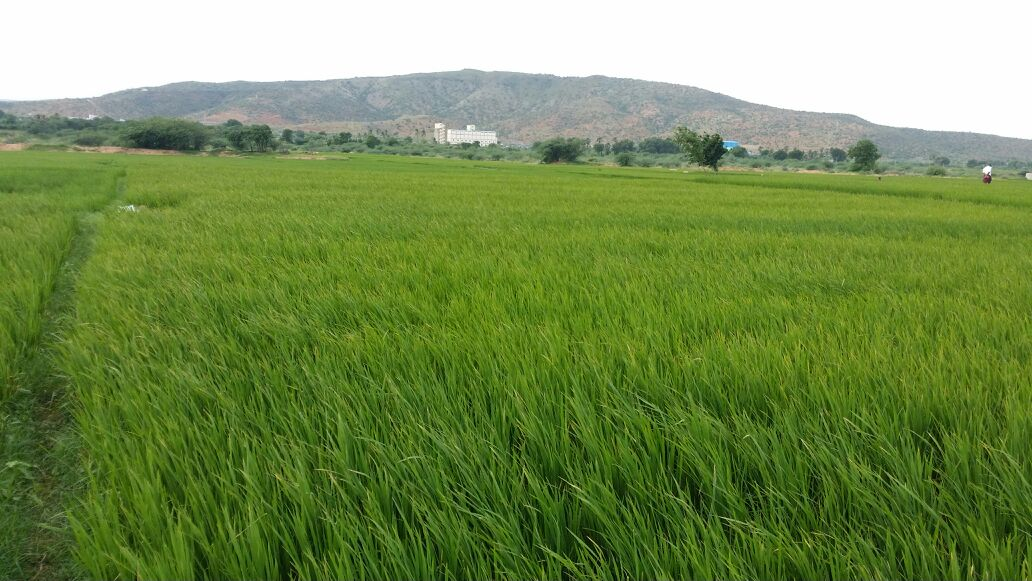
- Rice paddy fields in Kondapuram
- Interactive map of Kondapuram
- Location in Andhra Pradesh, India Kondapuram (India)
- Coordinates: 14°46′00″N 78°12′00″E
- Country: India
- State: Andhra Pradesh
- Revenue Division: Jammalamadugu
- District: YSR Kadapa

Languages
  - Official: Telugu
- Time zone: UTC+5:30 (IST)
- PIN: 516444
- Telephone code: 08560
- Vehicle registration: AP

Kondapuram is a village in YSR Kadapa district of the Indian state of Andhra Pradesh. It is located in Kondapuram mandal of Jammalamadugu revenue division.

It belongs to Rayalaseema region . It is located 89 km towards west from District headquarters Kadapa. It is a Mandal headquarter.

According to 2011 Census, Kondapuram Local Language is Telugu. Kondapuram town Total population is 6433 and number of houses are 1551. Female Population is 52.0%. town literacy rate is 67.3% and the Female Literacy rate is 31.7%.

== Transportation ==
Kondapuram railway station is a railway station located on the Guntakal–Renigunta railway line operated by the South Coast Railway zone.
