= Badvel Assembly constituency =

Constituency of the Andhra Pradesh Legislative Assembly, India

Coordinates: 14.74°N 79.05°E

Badvel
- Constituency No. 124 for the Andhra Pradesh Legislative Assembly
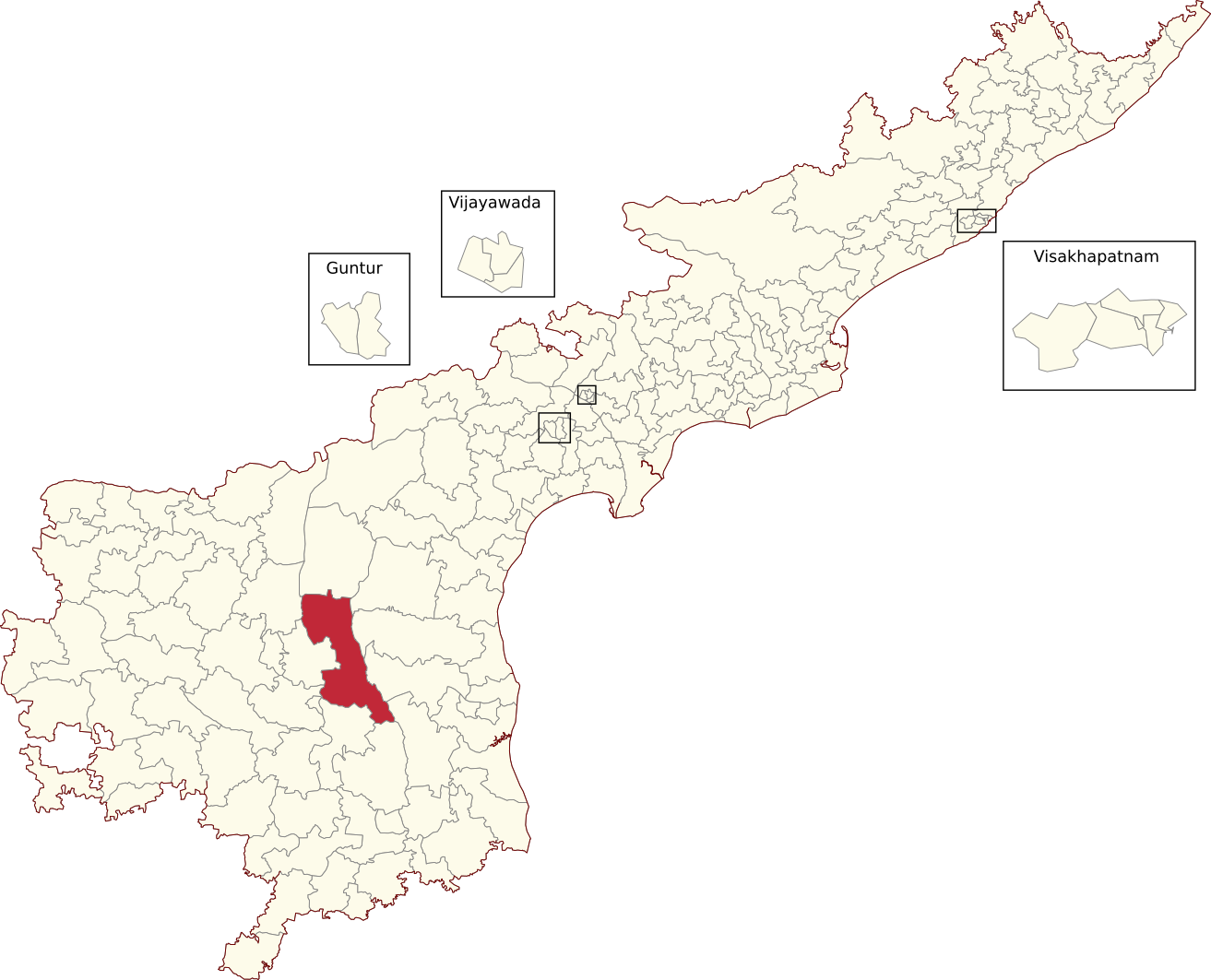
- Location of Badvel Assembly constituency within Andhra Pradesh

Constituency details
- Country: India
- Region: South India
- State: Andhra Pradesh
- District: YSR Kadapa
- Lok Sabha constituency: Kadapa
- Established: 1951
- Total electors: 204,618
- Reservation: SC

Member of Legislative Assembly
- 16th Andhra Pradesh Legislative Assembly
- Incumbent Dasari Sudha
- Party: YSRCP
- Elected year: 2024

Badvel is a Scheduled Caste reserved constituency in YSR Kadapa district of Andhra Pradesh that elects representatives to the Andhra Pradesh Legislative Assembly in India. It is one of the seven assembly segments of Kadapa Lok Sabha constituency.

Dasari Sudha is the current MLA of the constituency, having won the 2021 by-election from YSR Congress Party after the death of the incumbent MLA Gunthoti Venkata Subbaiah from YSR Congress Party, having won the 2019 Andhra Pradesh Legislative Assembly election. As of 25 March 2019, there are a total of 204,618 electors in the constituency. The constituency was established in 1951, as per the Delimitation Orders (1951).

== Mandals ==
Mandal
Kalasapadu
B.Kodur
Sri Avadhutha Kasinaya
Porumamilla
Badvel
Gopavaram
Atlur

== Members of the Legislative Assembly ==
| Year | Member | Political party |
|---|---|---|
| 1952 | Vaddemanu Chidanandam | Independent |
| 1955 | Bandaru Ratnasabhapathy | Indian National Congress |
| 1962 | Vaddemanu Chidanandam | Swatantra Party |
| 1967 | B. Veera Reddy | Indian National Congress |
| 1972 | B. Veera Reddy | Indian National Congress |
| 1978 | Vaddemanu Sivaramakrishna Rao | Janata Party |
| 1983 | B. Veera Reddy | Telugu Desam Party |
| 1985 | B. Veera Reddy | Telugu Desam Party |
| 1989 | Vaddemanu Sivaramakrishna Rao | Indian National Congress |
| 1994 | B. Veera Reddy | Telugu Desam Party |
| 1999 | B. Veera Reddy | Telugu Desam Party |
| 2001 by-election | Konireddy Vijayamma | Telugu Desam Party |
| 2004 | Devasani Chinna Govinda Reddy | Indian National Congress |
| 2009 | P. M. Kamalamma | Indian National Congress |
| 2014 | Thiriveedi Jayaramulu | YSR Congress Party |
| 2019 | Gunthoti Venkata Subbaiah | YSR Congress Party |
| 2021* | Dasari Sudha | YSR Congress Party |
| 2024 | Dasari Sudha | YSR Congress Party |

*by-election

== Election results ==
=== 2024 ===
2024 Andhra Pradesh Legislative Assembly election: Badvel
| Party | Candidate | Votes | % | ±% |
|---|---|---|---|---|
| YSRCP | Dasari Sudha | 90,410 | 51.69 | |
| BJP | Bojja Roshanna | 71,843 | 41.08 | |
| INC | Neerugattu Dora Vijaya Jyothi | 7,366 | 4.21 | |
| NOTA | None Of The Above | 3,076 | 1.75 | |
| Majority | | 18,567 | 10.61 | |
| Turnout | | 1,74,880 | | |
| YSRCP hold | | Swing | | |

=== 2021 by-election ===
The death of sitting MLA Gunthoti Venkata Subbaiah necessitated the by-election for Badvel Assembly constituency. The Election Commission of India announced that an election would take place on 28 September 2021.

Sitting party YSRCP decided to field Gunthoti Venkata Subbaiah's wife, Dr. Dasari Sudha.

Results were declared on November 2. Dr. Dasari Sudha of YSRCP won the election with a majority of 90,089 votes.

2021 Andhra Pradesh Legislative Assembly by-election: Badvel
| Party | Candidate | Votes | % | ±% |
|---|---|---|---|---|
| YSRCP | Dasari Sudha | 112,211 | 76.25 | +15.33 |
| BJP | Panathala Suresh | 21,678 | 14.73 | +14.27 |
| INC | P M Kamalamma | 6,235 | 4.24 | +2.50 |
| None of the Above | None of the Above | 3,650 | 2.48 | +1.20 |
| Majority | | 90,533 | 61.43 | +31.74 |
| Turnout | | 1,46,983 | 67.12 | −10.52 |
| YSRCP hold | | Swing | | |

=== 2019 ===
2019 Andhra Pradesh Legislative Assembly election: Badvel
| Party | Candidate | Votes | % | ±% |
|---|---|---|---|---|
| YSRCP | Gunthoti Venkata Subbaiah | 95,482 | 60.89 | +10.23 |
| TDP | Obulapuram Rajasekhar | 50,748 | 32.36 | −11.82 |
| Independent | Neerugattu Dora Vijaya Jyothi | 2,883 | 1.84 | |
| None of the Above | None of the Above | 2,004 | 1.28 | |
| Majority | | 44,734 | 29.69 | +23.57 |
| Turnout | | 1,50,621 | 77.64 | +4.77 |
| YSRCP hold | | Swing | | |

=== 2014 ===
2014 Andhra Pradesh Legislative Assembly election: Badvel
| Party | Candidate | Votes | % | ±% |
|---|---|---|---|---|
| YSRCP | Thiriveedi Jayaramulu | 78,879 | 50.66 | |
| TDP | N. D. Vijaya Jyothi | 68,800 | 44.18 | |
| CPI | Seeli Venkata Subbaiah | 2,185 | 1.4 | |
| INC | J Kamal Prabhash | 1,524 | 0.98 | |
| None of the Above | None of the Above | 550 | 0.35 | |
| Majority | | 9,502 | 6.12 | |
| Turnout | | 155,132 | 72.87 | −0.20 |
| YSRCP gain from INC | | Swing | | |

=== 2009 ===
2009 Andhra Pradesh Legislative Assembly election: Badvel
| Party | Candidate | Votes | % | ±% |
|---|---|---|---|---|
| INC | P. M. Kamalamma | 78,486 | 58.08 | +6.59 |
| TDP | Chennaiah Lakkineni | 41,892 | 31.00 | −15.72 |
| PRP | Singamala Venkateswarlu | 9,574 | 7.08 | |
| BJP | Singamala Venkateswarlu | 1,415 | 1.05 | |
| Majority | | 36,594 | 27.08 | |
| Turnout | | 135,134 | 73.07 | +0.88 |
| INC hold | | Swing | | |

=== 2004 ===
2004 Andhra Pradesh Legislative Assembly election: Badvel
| Party | Candidate | Votes | % | ±% |
|---|---|---|---|---|
| INC | Chinna Govinda Reddy Devasani | 57,023 | 51.49 | +8.48 |
| TDP | Konireddy Vijayamma | 51742 | 46.72 | −6.72 |
| Majority | | 5,281 | 4.77 | |
| Turnout | | 153,429 | 72.19 | +0.28 |
| INC gain from TDP | | Swing | | |

=== 1952 ===
1952 Madras Legislative Assembly election: Badvel
| Party | Candidate | Votes | % | ±% |
|---|---|---|---|---|
| Independent | Vedamani Chidanandam | 23,434 | 55.84 | |
| INC | Bommu Ramareddi | 16,686 | 39.76 | 39.76 |
| Independent | Avadanam Venkata Subbaiah | 1,847 | 4.40 | |

== See also ==
- List of constituencies of Andhra Pradesh Legislative Assembly
