= Gospadu =

- village
- Interactive map of Gospadu
- Location in Andhra Pradesh, India
- Coordinates: 15°21′20″N 78°25′9″E
- Country: India
- State: Andhra Pradesh
- District: Nandyal
- Talukas: Gospadu

Population (2011)
  - Total: 4,496

Languages
  - Official: Telugu
- Time zone: UTC+5:30 (IST)
- Vehicle registration: AP

Gospadu is a village in Gospadu mandal, located in Nandyal district of Indian state of Andhra Pradesh.

== Geography ==
Gospadu is located at 15°21'20" N 78°25'9" E. Gospadu is located on state high way SH23 between Nandyal and koilakuntla.

== Villages ==
- Sambavaram
