= Darur Pullaiah =

Indian politician

Member of Parliament, Lok Sabha
- In office 1977-1984
- Preceded by: Ponnapati Antony Reddi
- Succeeded by: Devineni Narayanaswami
- Constituency: Anantapur, Andhra Pradesh

Personal details
- Born: 20 June 1939 Chayapuram, Anantapur, Madras Presidency, British India (Now Andhra Pradesh, India)
- Party: Indian National Congress
- Spouse: D. Satyavathi
- Children: One son and six daughters
- Education: Loyola College, Chennai; Madras Law College

Darur Pullaiah is an Indian politician belonging to the Indian National Congress. He was elected to the Lok Sabha, the lower house of the Indian Parliament, from Anantapur, Andhra Pradesh in 1977 and 1980. He was a student of Loyola College and studied law in Madras Law College.
