= Rayadurg Assembly constituency =

Constituency of the Andhra Pradesh Legislative Assembly, India

Coordinates: 14.70°N 76.85°E

Rayadurg
- Constituency No. 148 for the Andhra Pradesh Legislative Assembly
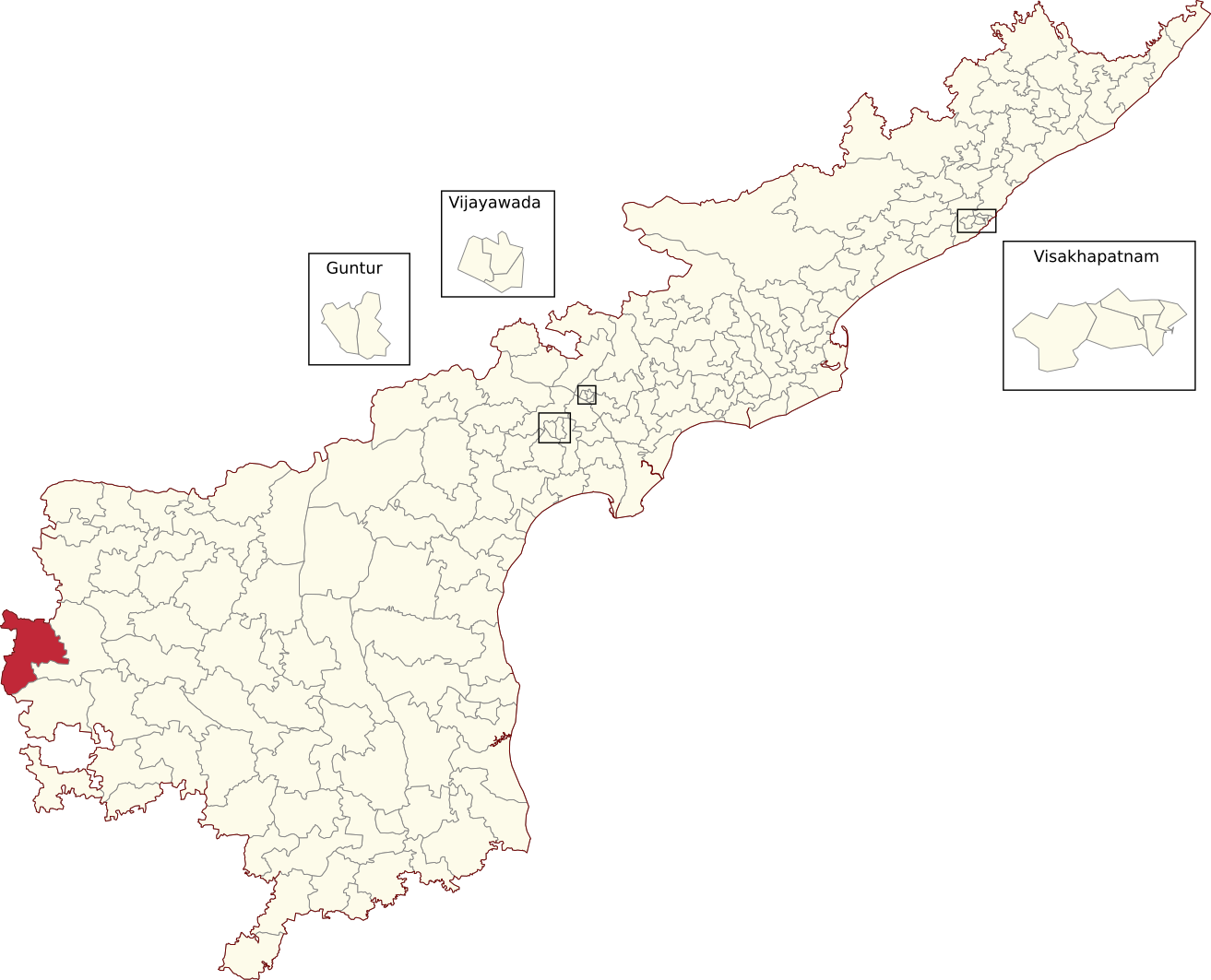
- Location of Rayadurg Assembly constituency within Andhra Pradesh

Constituency details
- Country: India
- Region: South India
- State: Andhra Pradesh
- District: Anantapur
- Lok Sabha constituency: Anantapur
- Established: 1951
- Total electors: 249,553
- Reservation: None

Member of Legislative Assembly
- 16th Andhra Pradesh Legislative Assembly
- Incumbent Kalava Srinivasulu
- Party: TDP
- Alliance: NDA
- Elected year: 2024

Rayadurg Assembly constituency is a constituency in Anantapur district of Andhra Pradesh that elects representatives to the Andhra Pradesh Legislative Assembly in India. It is one of the seven assembly segments of the constituencies in Anantapur Lok Sabha constituency.

Kalava Srinivasulu is the current MLA of the constituency, having won the 2024 Andhra Pradesh Legislative Assembly election from Telugu Desam Party. As of 2019, there are a total of 249,553 electors in the constituency. The constituency was established in 1951, as per the Delimitation Orders (1951).

== Mandals ==
Mandal
D. Hirehal
Rayadurg
Kanekal
Bommanahal
Gummagatta

Mandals in Rayadurg Assembly Constituency

== Members of the Legislative Assembly ==
^ indicates by-election

Year	Member	Political party
1952	G. Nagabushanam	Indian National Congress
1955	Seshadri	Indian National Congress
1962	Lakka Chinnapa Reddy	Indian National Congress
1967	J. Thippeswamy	Swatantra Party
1972	J. Thippeswamy	Indian National Congress
1978	K.B.Chennamllappa	Indian National Congress
1983	P. Venngopal Reddy	Independent
1985	Bandi Hulikuntappa	Indian National Congress
1989	Patil Venugopal Reddy	Indian National Congress
1994	Bandi Hulikuntappa	Telugu Desam Party
1999	Patil Venugopala Reddy	Indian National Congress
2004	Mettu Govinda Reddy	Telugu Desam Party
2009	Kapu Ramachandra Reddy	Indian National Congress
2012^	Kapu Ramachandra Reddy	YSR Congress Party
2014	Kalava Srinivasulu	Telugu Desam Party
2019	Kapu Ramachandra Reddy	YSR Congress Party
2024	Kalava Srinivasulu	Telugu Desam Party

== Election results ==
=== 1952 ===
1952 Madras Legislative Assembly election: Rayadurg
Party	Candidate	Votes	%	±%
INC	G. Nagabushanam	20,812	54.05%	54.05%
Independent	K. Chinna Basappa Chowdary	14,544	37.77%	
Independent	Moguru Chandrakantha Naidu	1,855	4.82%	
Independent	N. Ranga Rao	1,295	3.36%	
Margin of victory		6,268	16.28%	
Turnout		38,506	63.62%	
Registered electors		60,524		
INC win (new seat)				

=== 2004 ===
2004 Andhra Pradesh Legislative Assembly election: Rayadurg
Party	Candidate	Votes	%	±%
TDP	Mettu Govinda Reddy	66,188	52.00	−0.80
INC	Patil Venugopal Reddy	56,083	44.06	−0.49
Majority		10,105	7.94	
Turnout		127,287	72.75	−5.24
TDP gain from INC		Swing		

=== 2009 ===
2009 Andhra Pradesh Legislative Assembly election: Rayadurg
Party	Candidate	Votes	%	±%
INC	Kapu Ramachandra Reddy	76,259	48.93	−4.87
TDP	Mettu Govinda Reddy	62,168	39.89	−12.11
PRP	Bosula Manohar	9,670	6.20	
Majority		14,091	9.04	
Turnout		155,854	78.65	+5.90
INC gain from TDP		Swing		

=== 2014 ===
2014 Andhra Pradesh Legislative Assembly election: Rayadurg
Party	Candidate	Votes	%	±%
TDP	Kalava Srinivasulu	92,344	47.91	
YSRCP	Kapu Ramachandra Reddy	90,517	46.96	
Majority		1,827	0.95	
Turnout		192,751	85.35	+12.60
TDP gain from YSRCP		Swing		

=== 2019 ===
2019 Andhra Pradesh Legislative Assembly election: Rayadurg
Party	Candidate	Votes	%	±%
YSRCP	Kapu Ramachandra Reddy	112,000	51.46%	
TDP	Kalava Srinivasulu	91,994	41.96%	
Majority		14,049	6.5%	
Turnout		216,112	86.6%	+1.25%
YSRCP gain from TDP		Swing		

=== 2024 ===
2024 Andhra Pradesh Legislative Assembly election: Rayadurg
Party	Candidate	Votes	%	±%
TDP	Kalava Srinivasulu	130,309	57.09	
YSRCP	Mettu Govinda Reddy	88,650	38.84	
INC	M. B. Chinnapayya	3,388	1.48	
NOTA	None of the above	2,370	1.04	
Majority		41,659	18.25	
Turnout		2,28,267		
TDP hold		Swing		

== See also ==
- List of constituencies of Andhra Pradesh Legislative Assembly
