= Ch. Adinarayana Reddy =

Indian politician (born 1964)

Chadipiralla Adinarayana Reddy

Minister of Marketing, Warehousing, Animal Husbandry, Dairy Development, Fisheries & Cooperatives Government of Andhra Pradesh
- In office 2 April 2017 – 29 May 2019
- Governor: E. S. L. Narasimhan
- Chief Minister: N. Chandrababu Naidu
- Preceded by: Prathipati Pulla Rao
- Succeeded by: Kurasala Kannababu

Member of Legislative Assembly Andhra Pradesh
- Incumbent
- Assumed office 2024
- Preceded by: Mule Sudheer Reddy
- Constituency: Jammalamadugu
- In office 2004–2019
- Preceded by: Ramasubbareddy Ponnapureddy
- Succeeded by: Mule Sudheer Reddy
- Constituency: Jammalamadugu

Personal details
- Born: 4 June 1958 (age 68)
- Party: Bharatiya Janata Party (2019-present)
- Other political affiliations: Telugu Desam Party (2016-2019); YSR Congress Party (2011-2016); Indian National Congress (2004-2011)
- Spouse: Smt C. Arunamma
- Children: 2 (son & daughter)
- Profession: Politician; Lecturer

Chadipiralla Adinarayana Reddy is an Indian politician. He was a Member of Legislative Assembly, representing Jammalamadugu (Assembly constituency) in Andhra Pradesh. He won as MLA from Indian National Congress party in 2004 and 2009. Later he joined YSRCP and won as MLA in 2014. Later he moved from YSRCP to TDP and worked as Minister for Marketing & Warehousing, Animal husbandry, Dairy development, Fisheries and Cooperatives. Presently he joined BJP and has been posted as vice president for BJP in Andhra Pradesh.

Chadipiralla's family has been active in politics since 1990. He has worked as chemistry lecturer in B.A.R. junior college, Parlapadu. He has won as MLA on behalf of Indian National Congress 2 consecutive times from Jammalamadugu [2004-2014] and won as MLA on behalf of YSRCP party from Jammalamadugu [2014-2019].

In 2016, Nara Chandrababu Naidu Garu welcomed him into Telugu Desam Party and has given the responsibility of Kadapa MLC. He has played a key role in TDP's victory. TDP Party president has entrusted him with role of State Cabinet Minister for Marketing & Warehousing, Animal husbandry, Dairy development, Fisheries and Cooperative in 2017.

He has played a major role in TDP towards victory in Nandyal elections 2017.

He has contested as MP candidate from Kadapa parliamentary segment and lost in 2019.

Positions held:

- 2004-2009 MLA Jammalamadugu
- 2009-2014 MLA Jammalamadugu
- 2014-2019 MLA Jammalamadugu
- 2017-2019 Cabinet Minister for Marketing & Warehousing, Animal husbandry, Dairy development, Fisheries and Cooperative
- 2020 - Incumbent - Vice President - AP - BJP
- 2024-2029 MLA Jammalamadugu
