= Anantapur Urban Assembly constituency =

Constituency of the Andhra Pradesh Legislative Assembly, India

Coordinates: 14.67°N 77.60°E

Anantapur Urban
- Constituency No. 153 for the Andhra Pradesh Legislative Assembly
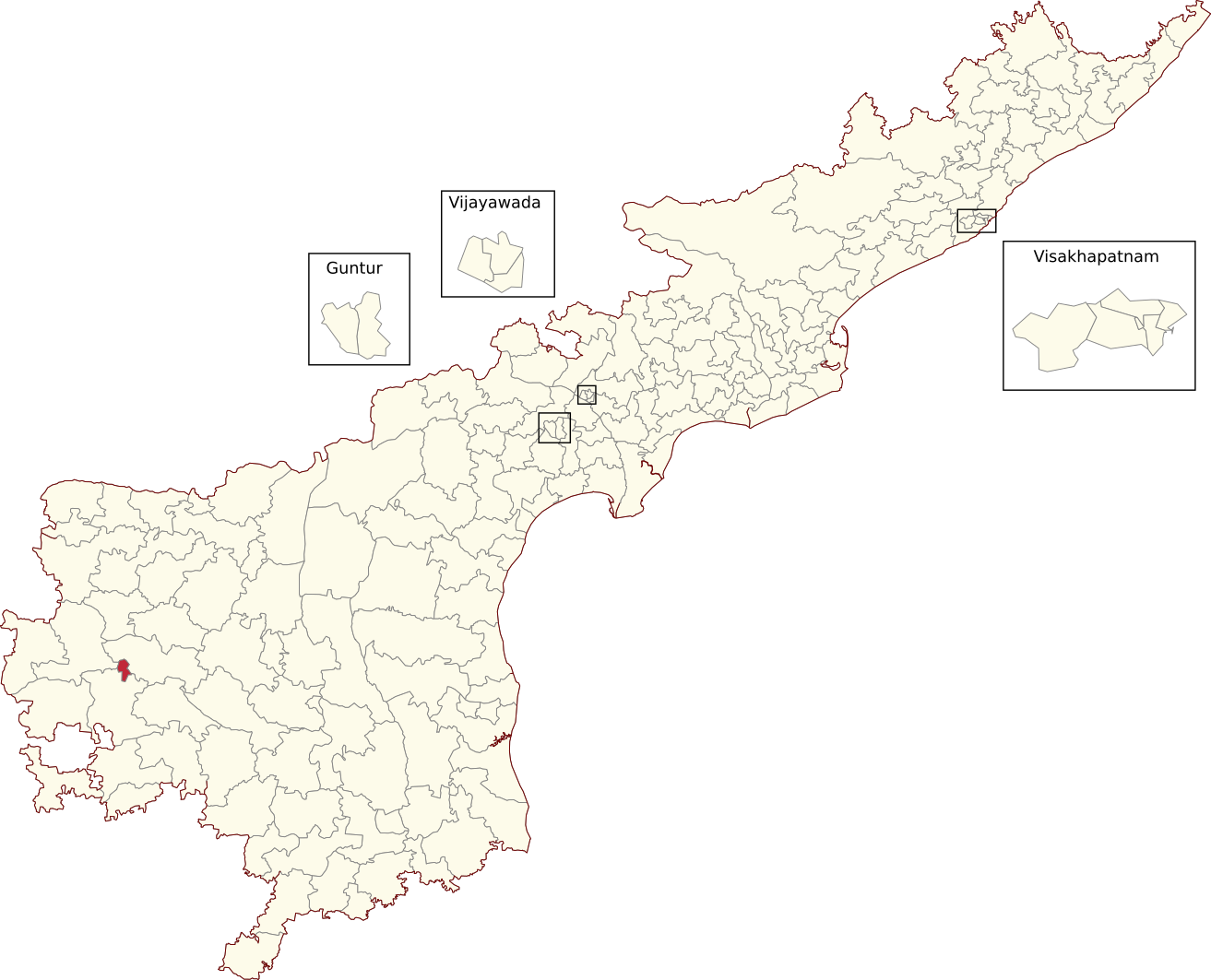
- Location of Anantapur Urban Assembly constituency within Andhra Pradesh

Constituency details
- Country: India
- Region: South India
- State: Andhra Pradesh
- District: Anantapur
- Lok Sabha constituency: Anantapur
- Established: 2008
- Total electors: 255,682
- Reservation: None

Member of Legislative Assembly
- 16th Andhra Pradesh Legislative Assembly
- Incumbent Daggubati Venkateswara Prasad
- Party: TDP
- Alliance: NDA
- Elected year: 2024

Anantapur Urban Assembly constituency is a constituency in Anantapur district of Andhra Pradesh that elects representatives to the Andhra Pradesh Legislative Assembly in India. It is one of the seven assembly segments of Anantapur Lok Sabha constituency.

Daggupati Venkateswara Prasad is the current MLA of the constituency, having won the 2024 Andhra Pradesh Legislative Assembly election from Telugu Desam Party. As of 2019, there are a total of 255,682 electors in the constituency. The constituency was established in 2008, as per the Delimitation Orders (2008).

== Members of the Legislative Assembly ==
Year	Member	Political party
2009	Bodimalla Gurunatha Reddy	Indian National Congress
2012	Bodimalla Gurunatha Reddy	YSR Congress Party
2014	V. Prabhakar Chowdary	Telugu Desam Party
2019	Anantha Venkatarami Reddy	YSR Congress Party
2024	Daggupati Venkateswara Prasad	Telugu Desam Party

== Election results ==
=== 2009 ===
2009 Andhra Pradesh Legislative Assembly election: Anantapur Urban
Party	Candidate	Votes	%	±%
INC	B Gurunatha Reddy	45,275	39.03	
TDP	Mahalakshmi Sreenivasulu	32,033	27.61	
PRP	T J Prakash	28,489	24.56	
Majority		13,242	13.42	
Turnout		116,008	50.47	
INC win (new seat)				

2012

2012 Andhra Pradesh Legislative Assembly by-election: Anantpur Urban
Party	Candidate	Votes	%	±%
YSRCP	Bodimalla Gurunatha Reddy	65,711	52.90	
TDP	M. Sreenivasulu	40,980	32.98	
Majority				
Turnout				
YSRCP gain from INC		Swing		

=== 2014 ===
2014 Andhra Pradesh Legislative Assembly election: Anantapur Urban
Party	Candidate	Votes	%	±%
TDP	V. Prabhakar Chowdary	74,704	48.07	
YSRCP	B Gurunatha Reddy	65,370	42.06	
Majority		9,334	6.01	
Turnout		155,417	61.50	+11.03
TDP gain from INC		Swing		

=== 2019 ===
2019 Andhra Pradesh Legislative Assembly election: Anantapur Urban
Party	Candidate	Votes	%	±%
YSRCP	Anantha Venkatarami Reddy	88,704	53.71%	
TDP	V Prabhakar Chowdary	60,006	36%	
JSP	T. C. Varun	10,920	7%	
Majority		28,698	17.37%	
Turnout		1,65,141		+3.08%
YSRCP gain from TDP		Swing		

=== 2024 ===
2024 Andhra Pradesh Legislative Assembly election: Anantapur Urban
Party	Candidate	Votes	%	±%
TDP	Daggupati Venkateswara Prasad	103,334	54.51	
YSRCP	Anantha Venkatarami Reddy	80,311	42.36	
CPI	C. Jaffer	2,838	1.50	
JAI BHARATH NATIONAL PARTY	AKULA RAGHAVENDRA	1,309	0.71	
NOTA	None Of The Above	1,379	0.73	
Majority		23,023	12.14	
Turnout		1,89,575		
TDP gain from YSRCP		Swing		

== See also ==
- Anantapur Assembly constituency
- List of constituencies of Andhra Pradesh Legislative Assembly
