= Konireddy Vijayamma =

Indian politician

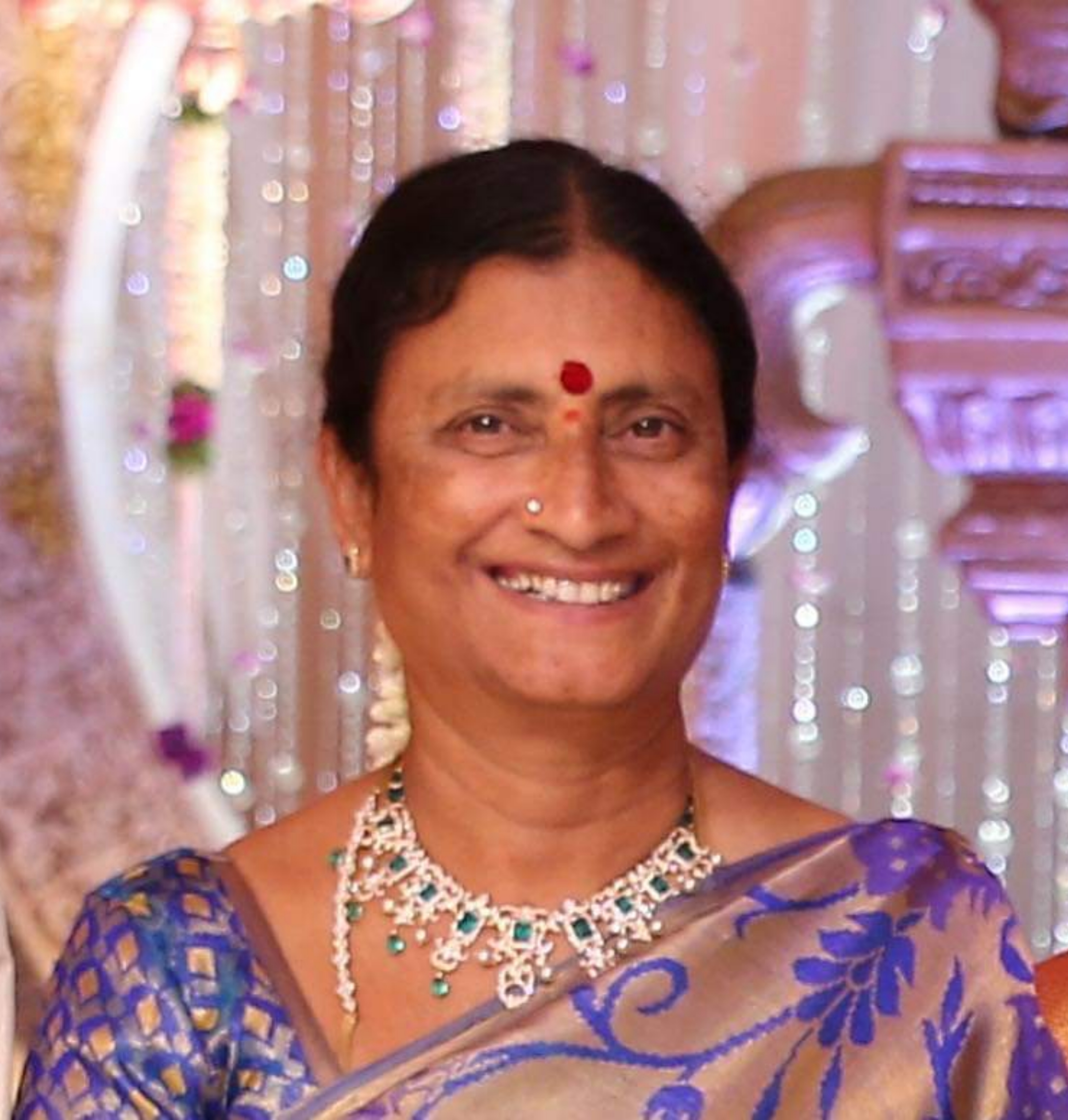

Member of the Andhra Pradesh Legislative Assembly
- In office 2001–2004
- Preceded by: B. Veera Reddy
- Succeeded by: Devasani Chinna Govinda Reddy
- Constituency: Badvel

Personal details
- Party: Telugu Desam Party
- Relations: B. Veera Reddy (father)

Konireddy Vijayamma is an Indian politician from Andhra Pradesh. She is a former Member of the Legislative Assembly from Badvel.

Vijayamma is from Badvel. She is the daughter of former MLA B. Veera Reddy, whose death caused the vacancy. Telugu Desam Party nominated her for the by election held on 19 February 2001.

She won the by-election from the Badvel Assembly constituency representing the Telugu Desam Party. She polled 58,805 votes and defeated her nearest rival, Vaddamani Sivarama Krishna Rao of the Indian National Congress, by a margin of 19,368 votes.

In 2004, she lost her re-election bid to Indian National Congress candidate Devasani Chinna Govinda Reddy.
