= Sambavaram =

- Village
- Interactive map of Sambavaram
- Location in Andhra Pradesh, India
- Coordinates: 15.4125°N 78.4937°E
- Country: India
- State: Andhra Pradesh
- District: Nandyal
- Mandal: Gospadu

Population (2011)
  - Total: 2,813
  - Density: 400/km^{2} (1,000/sq mi)

Languages
  - Official: Telugu
- Time zone: UTC+5:30 (IST)
- PIN: 518502 Chabolu P.O

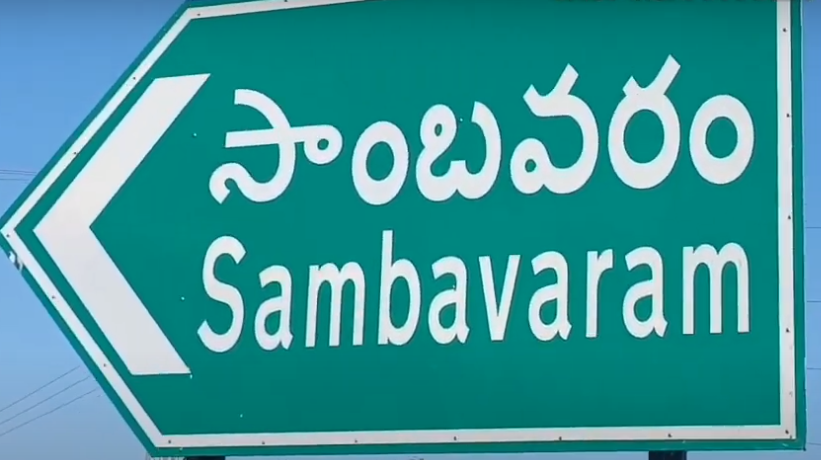
సాంబవరం గ్రామం

Sambavaram is a village in the Nandyal district of the Indian state of Andhra Pradesh. It is located in Gospadu mandal of Nandyal revenue division 2 km (1.2 mi) from NH 40.

== Etymology ==
The word Samba సాంబశివుడు and Varam is వరంగా ఇచ్చాడు. The word ''Sambavaram'' has a close connection with ''Parvatipuram'' (a neighboring village).

== Geography ==
Sambavaram is in east-Deebaguntla, west-Chabolu, south-Raitunagar, National Highway 40.

== Landmarks ==
A Saibaba temple and statue sit near National Highway 40.

== Demographics ==
According to the 2011 census, Sambavaram has 2,813 people, including Hindus, Muslims, and Christians. Sambavaram has a total literacy rate of 53.9 percent and a female literacy rate of 21.7 percent.

== Agriculture ==
This village has paddies and many crops under the K. C. canal.

== Education ==
Sambavaram has a government-run primary school.

== Politics ==
Sambavaram is under the Nandyal Legislative Assembly.

== Transport ==
Roads and the Nandyal railway station are the available modes of transport.
