= J. C. Prabhakar Reddy =

Indian politician

Member of Legislative Assembly Andhra Pradesh
- In office 16 May 2014 – 23 May 2019
- Preceded by: J. C. Diwakar Reddy
- Succeeded by: Kethireddy Pedda Reddy
- Constituency: Tadipatri

Personal details
- Born: 25 May 1952 (age 73) Tadipatri, Anantapur district, Andhra Pradesh
- Party: Telugu Desam Party
- Spouse: Smt J. C. Uma Reddy
- Children: J. C. Ashmit Reddy
- Parents: J. C. Nagi Reddy (father); J. C. Naga Lakshmamma (mother)
- Relatives: J. C. Diwakar Reddy (Brother)
- Occupation: Politician

Juturu Chinnareddy Prabhakar Reddy is an Indian politician belonging to Telugu Desam Party and current chairperson of Tadipatri municipality in Anantapur district. He served as a member of 14th Andhra Pradesh Assembly representing Tadpatri Assembly constituency.

== Family ==
He is the younger brother of J. C. Diwakar Reddy. His son J.C.Ashmit Reddy is the member of 16th Andhra Pradesh Assembly.

== Politics ==
He was elected as chairperson of the Municipal Council Tadipatri for the first time in 1987. Again he was elected as chairperson of the Tadipatri Municipal Council in the year March 2000. From October 2005 onwards he served as vice-chairperson of the Municipal Council Tadipatri up to October 2010.
