= Muddanur =

Muddanuru Muddanur
- Census Town
- Chennai-Mumbai Mail

- Location in Andhra Pradesh, India
- Coordinates: 14.6667°N 78.4000°E
- Country: India
- State: Andhra Pradesh
- District: Kadapa
- Talukas: Muddanur

Government
  - Member of Parliament: Y. S. Avinash ReddyYSRCP (YSRCP)
  - Member of Legislative Assembly: chadipiralla adinarayana reddy (BJP)
- Elevation 410: 125 m (410 ft)

Population (2011)
  - Total: 9,775

Languages
  - Official: Telugu
- Time zone: UTC+5:30 (IST)
- Pincode: 516380
- Vehicle registration: AP

Muddanur is a town in Kadapa district of the Indian state of Andhra Pradesh. It is located in Muddanur mandal of Jammalamadugu revenue division. Muddanur has its own train station connecting major cities.

== Education ==
The primary and secondary school education is imparted by government, aided and private schools, under the School Education Department of the state. The medium of instruction followed by different schools are English, Telugu.

== Weather ==
Muddanur

Climate chart (precipitation, max. and min. temperature)
J	F	M	A	M	J	J	A	S	O	N	D
- █ Average max. and min. temperatures in °C
- █ Precipitation totals in mm
Imperial conversion
J	F	M	A	M	J	J	A	S	O	N	D
- █ Average max. and min. temperatures in °F
- █ Precipitation totals in inches

Muddanur has a hot semi arid climate, where the people and its surroundings are pleasant and enjoyable. During summers, the temperatures soar to about 42-44 °C.

== Tranposrtation ==
Muddanuru railway station is situated on Guntakal–Renigunta railway line operated by the South Coast Railway zone under Guntakal railway division.

== See also ==
- List of census towns in Andhra Pradesh
