= Bijivemula Veera Reddy =

Indian politician

Member of Legislative Assembly, Andhra Pradesh
- In office 1994–2001
- Preceded by: Vaddemanu Sivaramakrishna Rao
- Succeeded by: Konireddy Vijayamma
- Constituency: Badvel
- In office 1983–1989
- Preceded by: Vaddemanu Sivaramakrishna Rao
- Succeeded by: Vaddemanu Sivaramakrishna Rao
- Constituency: Badvel
- In office 1967–1978
- Preceded by: Vaddamani Chidanandam
- Succeeded by: Vaddemanu Sivaramakrishna Rao
- Constituency: Badvel

Personal details
- Party: Telugu Desam Party
- Other political affiliations: Indian National Congress
- Children: Konireddy Vijayamma (daughter)

Bijivemula Veera Reddy (died 25 December 2000) was an Indian politician from Andhra Pradesh. He served as the minister in the Second N. Chandrababu Naidu ministry. He was a six time legislator from the Badvel Assembly constituency. He was a member of the Telugu Desam Party.
