= Mettu Govinda Reddy =

Chairman, Andhra Pradesh Industrial Infrastructure Corporation (APIIC)
- Incumbent
- Assumed office 17 July 2021 – present

Member of Legislative Assembly
- In office 2004–2009
- Constituency: Rayadurg

Personal details
- Born: 1 July 1953 (age 73) Unthakal, Bommanahal mandal, Anantapur district, Andhra Pradesh, India
- Party: YSR Congress Party
- Other political affiliations: Telugu Desam Party
- Children: 3

Mettu Govinda Reddy is an Indian politician from the state of Andhra Pradesh, a former Member of the Legislative Assembly (MLA), and a former Member of the Legislative Council (MLC). He was appointed as the chairman of APIIC on 17 July 2021.

== Political career ==
Mettu Govinda Reddy resigned from the Telugu Desam Party on 12 March 2019, and joined the YSR Congress Party on 13 March 2019 in the presence of Y. S. Jagan Mohan Reddy at Lotus Pond in Hyderabad.
