= Ponnapati Antony Reddi =

Indian politician

Ponnapati Antony Reddy
- Constituency: Anantapur

Personal details
- Born: 1 December 1908 Cowloor, Kurnool, Madras Presidency
- Died: c. 1985
- Party: Indian National Congress
- Spouse: Mariamma

Ponnapati Antony Reddy (1 December 1908 – c. 1985) was an Indian politician belonging to the Indian National Congress. He was elected to the Lok Sabha, the lower house of the Indian Parliament, from Anantapur, Andhra Pradesh in 1967 and 1971. He was a student of St. John's High School in Bellary and St. Joseph's College, Tiruchirappalli.
