= Kethireddy Pedda Reddy =

Indian politician

Member of Legislative Assembly Andhra Pradesh
- In office 23 May 2019 – 4 June 2024
- Preceded by: J. C. Prabhakar Reddy
- Succeeded by: J. C. Ashmit Reddy
- Constituency: Tadpatri

Personal details
- Born: 18 April 1966 (age 60) Timmampalli, Yellanur, Anantapur district, Andhra Pradesh
- Party: YSR Congress Party
- Spouse: Smt Kethireddy Ramadevi
- Relatives: Kethireddy Venkatarami Reddy (Nephew)

Kathireddy Pedda Reddy (born 1966) is an Indian politician from Andhra Pradesh. He was an MLA of YSR Congress Party from Tadipatri Assembly constituency in Anantapur district. He won the 2019 Andhra Pradesh Legislative Assembly election.

== Early life and family ==
Reddy was born in Timmampalli village of Yellanur mandal, Ananthpur district. His father, Rami Reddy, was a farmer. He completed schooling from Nirmala English Residential School, MPR Dam Garbdinne mandal, Anantapur district. He married Ramadevi. His nephew Kethireddy Venkatarami Reddy also served as a member of Andhra Pradesh Legislative Assembly.

== Political career and election history ==
Reddy began his political journey with YSR Congress Party. He won the 2019 Andhra Pradesh Legislative Assembly election from Tadipatri Assembly constituency representing YSR Congress Party. He defeated J. C. Ashmit Reddy of Telugu Desam Party by a margin of 7,511 votes. In the 2024 Andhra Pradesh Legislative Assembly election he lost to the same Telugu Desam Party candidate, Reddy, by a margin of 27,731 votes.
