= Daggupati Venkateswara Prasad =

Indian politician

Member of Legislative Assembly Andhra Pradesh
- Incumbent
- Assumed office 2024
- Preceded by: Anantha Venkatarami Reddy
- Constituency: Anantapur Urban

Personal details
- Born: 1976 (age 49–50)
- Party: Telugu Desam Party

Daggupati Venkateswara Prasad (born 10 August 1976) is an Indian politician from Andhra Pradesh. He is an MLA from Anantapur Urban Assembly constituency in Anantapur district. He represents Telugu Desam Party. He won the 2024 Andhra Pradesh Legislative Assembly election where TDP had an alliance with BJP and Jana Sena Party.

== Early life and education ==
Prasad is from Rapthadu, Anantapur district. His father Daggupati Chinnarappa was a farmer. He completed his Diploma in Mechanical Engineering in 1995 at Vasavi Polytechnic College, Banaganapalli, Kurnool district.

== Political career ==
Prasad won the 2024 Andhra Pradesh Legislative Assembly election from Anantapur Urban Assembly constituency representing Telugu Desam Party. He polled 103,334 votes and defeated his nearest rival Anantha Venkatarami Reddy of YSR Congress Party by a margin of 23,023 votes.
