= J. C. Ashmit Reddy =

Indian politician

Member of Legislative Assembly Andhra Pradesh
- Incumbent
- Assumed office 4 June 2024
- Preceded by: Kethireddy Pedda Reddy
- Constituency: Tadipatri

Personal details
- Born: 16 May 1983 (age 42) Tadipatri, Anantapur district, Andhra Pradesh
- Party: Telugu Desam Party
- Spouse: Smt Nikhila Reddy
- Children: 3 (son & daughter) ?
- Parents: J. C. Prabhakar Reddy (father); J. C. Uma Reddy (mother)
- Relatives: J. C. Diwakar Reddy (uncle); J. C. Nagi Reddy (Grand Father)
- Profession: Politician

Juturu Chinnareddy Ashmit Reddy (born 1983) is an Indian politician from Andhra Pradesh. He is a member of Telugu Desam Party. He is a Member of the Legislative Assembly representing the Tadipatri Assembly constituency in 2024 Andhra Pradesh Legislative Assembly elections.

== Early life and education ==
Reddy was born in Tadipatri, Anantapur district to J. C. Prabhakar Reddy, a former MLA. He married Nikhila Reddy. They have a son, Dheer Diwakar Reddy, and a daughter, Aihika Reddy. He completed his post graduation in M.Litt (Marketing) in 2008 from University of St. Andrews, Scotland. Later, he did B.E. in Mechanical Engineering in 2007 from Anna University, Chennai.

== Political career ==
Reddy started his political career with TDP and served as Tadipatri councillor in 2014. Later, he contested the 2019 Assembly election on TDP ticket from Tadpatri but lost by a narrow margin of 7,000 votes to YSRCP candidate Kethireddy Pedda Reddy. In the 2024 Andhra Pradesh Legislative Assembly election, he contested on TDP ticket and won with a majority of 27,731 votes against YSRCP candidate Kethireddy Pedda Reddy.
