= Guntakal–Renigunta section =

Railway line in India

- The prestigious Chennai Mumbai Mail runs along this section.

Overview
- Status: Operational
- Owner: Indian Railways
- Locale: Andhra Pradesh
- Termini: Guntakal Junction; Renigunta Junction

Service
- Operator: South Coast Railway

Technical
- Line length: 144.30 km (89.66 mi)
- Track gauge: 5 ft 6 in (1,676 mm) broad gauge
- Electrification: Yes
Route map
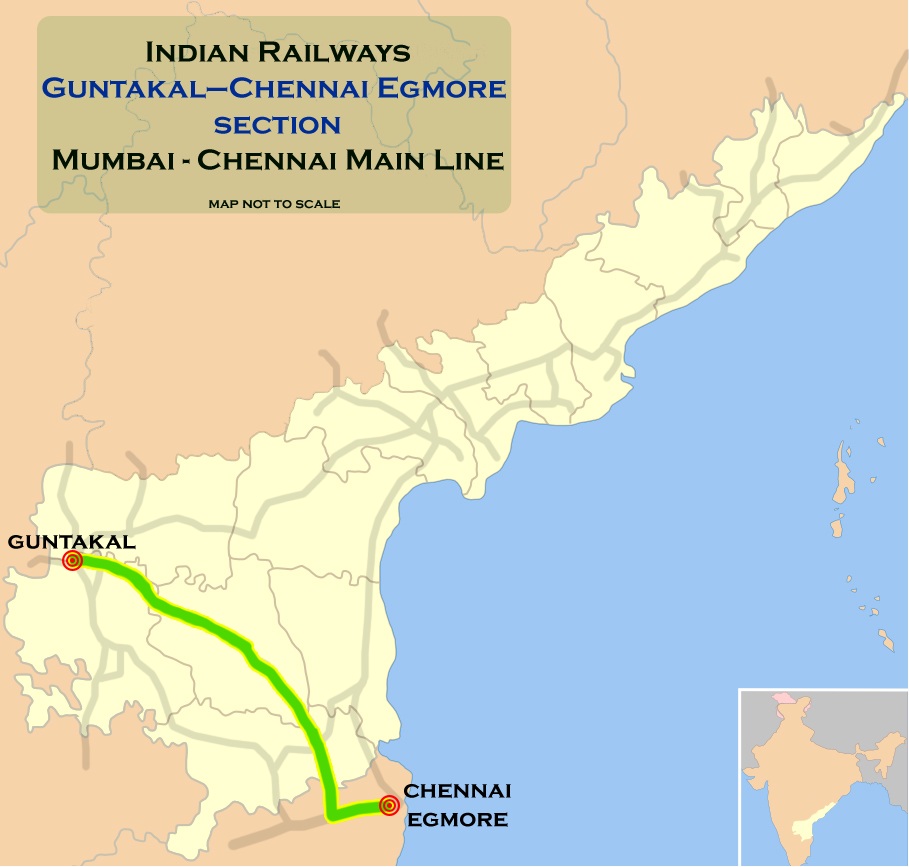

Guntakal–Renigunta section connects Guntakal and Renigunta in the Indian state of Andhra Pradesh. It is administered under Guntakal railway division of South Coast Railway zone. It has a total route length of 309.50 km (192.31 mi).

== History ==
The first train service in southern India and the third in India was operated by Madras Railway from Royapuram / Veyasarapady to Wallajah Road (Arcot) in 1856. Madras Railway extended its trunk route to Beypur / Kadalundi (near Calicut) and initiated work on a north-western branch out of Arakkonam in 1861. The branch line reached Renigunta in 1862. The branch line out of Arakkonam reached Raichur in 1871, where it connected to the Great Indian Peninsula Railway line from Mumbai.

=== Railway reorganization ===
In the early 1950s legislation was passed authorizing the central government to take over independent railway systems that were there. On 14 April 1951 the Madras and Southern Mahratta Railway, the South Indian Railway Company and Mysore State Railway were merged to form Southern Railway. Subsequently, Nizam's Guaranteed State Railway was also merged into Southern Railway. On 2 October 1966, the Secunderabad, Solapur, SSS Hubballi and Vijayawada Divisions, covering the former territories of Nizam's Guaranteed State Railway and certain portions of Madras and Southern Mahratta Railway were separated from Southern Railway to form the South Central Railway. In 1977, Guntakal division of Southern Railway was transferred to South Central Railway and the Solapur division transferred to Central Railway. Amongst the seven new zones created in 2003 was South Western Railway, which was carved out of Southern Railway.

== Electrification ==
Electrification of the 308 km long Renigunta–Guntakal section was announced in 2003 at a cost of Rs. 168 crore. The Renigunta–Nandalur sector electrification was completed in 2006. The Nandalur-Guntakal sector was electrified by 2013.

== Connectivity ==
Obulavaripalli in this line connects the newly constructing Krishnapatnam–Obulavaripalle railway line.

== Speed limit ==
As of 2022, doubling and electrification of the Renigunta–Guntakal section has been completed and commissioned with 130 KM Max. Permissible Speed.

== Sheds and workshops ==
Diesel Loco Shed, Guntakal was started as a metre-gauge shed but after gauge conversions in Guntakal and Hubli divisions a broad-gauge shed was opened in 1995. It houses WDM-2, WDM-3A, WDM-3D and WDG-3A locos. There is a routine overhaul depot for wagon maintenance at Raichur and a coaching maintenance depot at Guntakal.

Diesel Loco Shed, Gooty has one of the largest sheds with 175+ locos that include WDG-3A, WDM-3A, WDM-3D, WDG-4, WDP-4 diesel locos. It also handles routine maintenance for WDG-4 locos. It earlier used to be broad-gauge steam loco shed. Renigunta has an electric trip shed.
