= List of ministers of endowments of Andhra Pradesh =

Head of the Ministry of Endowments of the Government of Andhra Pradesh

Minister of Endowments
- Dēvādaya Śākha Mantrī
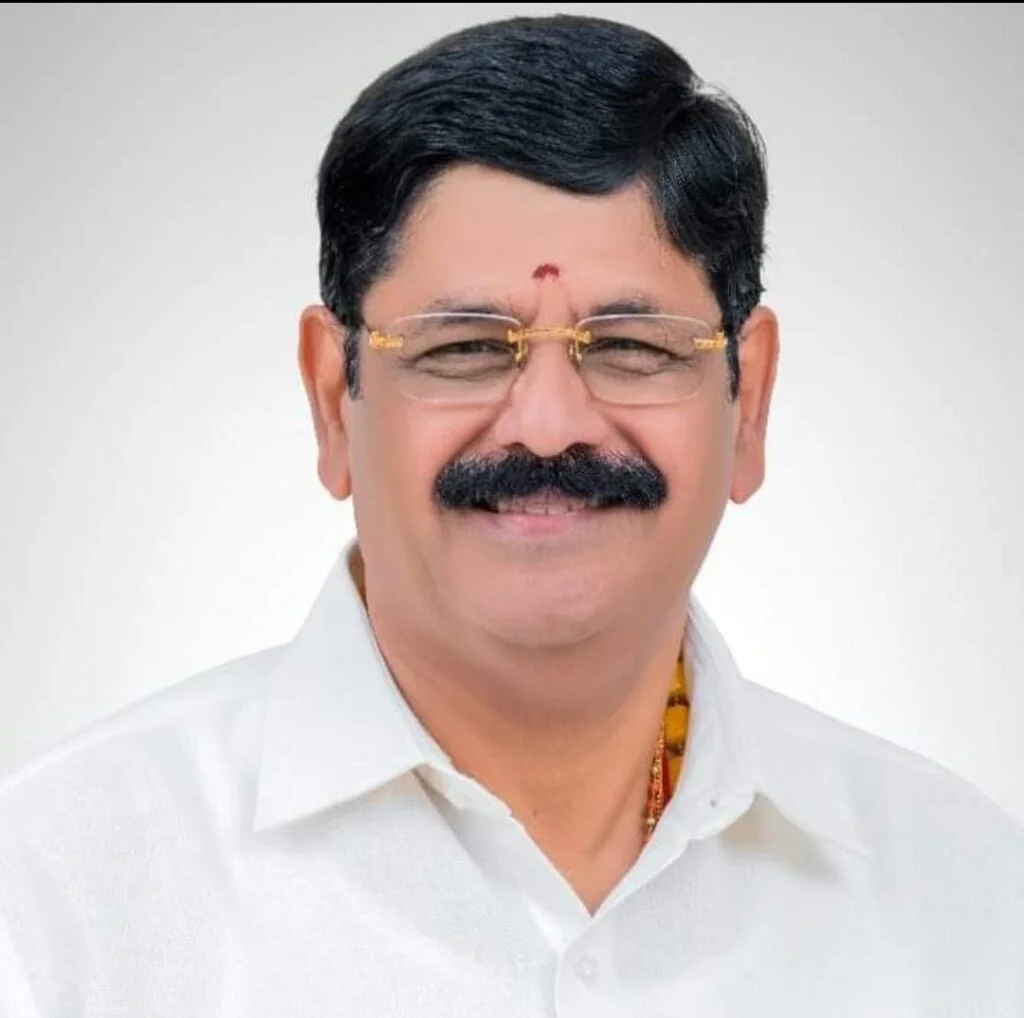
- Incumbent; Anam Ramanarayana Reddy since 12 June 2024
- Department of Endowments
- Member of: Andha Pradesh Cabinet
- Reports to: Governor of Andhra Pradesh; Chief Minister of Andhra Pradesh; Andhra Pradesh Legislature
- Appointer: Governor of Andhra Pradesh on the advice of the Chief Minister of Andhra Pradesh
- Precursor: Kottu Satyanarayana
- Inaugural holder: Pydikondala Manikyala Rao
- Formation: 8 June 2014
- Website: Official website

The minister for endowments is the head of the Department of Endowments in the Government of Andhra Pradesh.

The incumbent minister of endowments is Anam Ramanarayana Reddy from Telugu Desam Party.

== List of ministers ==
#	Portrait	Minister (Lifespan) Constituency	Term of office			Election (Term)	Party	Ministry	Chief Minister	Ref.
#	Portrait	Minister (Lifespan) Constituency	Term start	Term end	Duration	Election (Term)	Party	Ministry	Chief Minister	Ref.
1		Pydikondala Manikyala Rao (1961–2020); MLA for Tadepalligudem	8 June 2014	9 March 2018	3 years, 274 days	2014 (14th)	Bharatiya Janata Party	Naidu III	N. Chandrababu Naidu	
2		K. E. Krishna Murthy (born 1938); MLA for Pattikonda	25 March 2018	29 May 2019	1 year, 65 days	2014 (14th)	Telugu Desam Party	Naidu III	N. Chandrababu Naidu	
3		Vellampalli Srinivas (born 1972); MLA for Vijayawada West	30 May 2019	7 April 2022	2 years, 312 days	2019 (15th)	YSR Congress Party	Jagan	Y. S. Jagan Mohan Reddy	
4		Kottu Satyanarayana (born 1955); MLA for Tadepalligudem	11 April 2022	11 June 2024	2 years, 61 days	2019 (15th)	YSR Congress Party	Jagan	Y. S. Jagan Mohan Reddy	
5		Anam Ramanarayana Reddy (born 1952); MLA for Atmakur	12 June 2024	Incumbent	2 years, 87 days	2024 (16th)	Telugu Desam Party	Naidu IV	N. Chandrababu Naidu	
