= Tadepalli =

Tadepalli may refer to these places in India:

== Geography ==
- Tadepalligudem, a city in West Godavari district of Andhra Pradesh, India
  - Tadepalligudem (Assembly constituency)
  - Tadepalligudem Municipality
  - Tadepalligudem bus station
  - Tadepalligudem railway station
- Tadepalli, Guntur district, a town in Andhra Pradesh, India
- Tadepalli, Krishna district, a village in Krishna district, Andhra Pradesh, India
- Tadepalli, West Godavari district, a village in West Godavari district, Andhra Pradesh, India

=== Mandals ===
- Tadepalli mandal, Guntur district, a mandal in Guntur district, Andhra Pradesh, India
- Tadepalligudem mandal, a mandal in West Godavari district, Andhra Pradesh, India

=== Urban local bodies ===
- Tadepalli Municipality, a municipality in Andhra Pradesh, India
- Tadepalligudem Municipality, a municipality in Andhra Pradesh, India

== Surname ==
- Tadepalli Lakshmi Kanta Rao or Kantha Rao (1923–2009), Indian actor
- Tadepalli Venkata Narayana, Indian mathematician
