= Eli Venkata Madhusudhan Rao =

Indian politician (born 1961)

Eli Venkata Madhusudhan Rao (born 1961) is an Indian politician from Andhra Pradesh. He is a former member of the Andhra Pradesh Legislative Assembly from the Tadepalligudem Assembly constituency in the West Godavari district representing the Praja Rajyam Party in 2009.

== Early life ==
Rao is from Tadepalligudem, West Godavari district, Andhra Pradesh. He is the son of Eli Anjaneyulu and Eli Varalakshmi, both former MLAs from Tadepalligudem seat. He studied at Navabharathi Gurukulam, Rajahmundry, East Godavari district and passed the SSC examinations in 1976. He is a farmer. He declared assets worth Rs.4 crore in his affidavit to the Election Commission of India.

== Career ==
Rao won the Tadepalligudem Assembly constituency in the 2009 Andhra Pradesh Legislative Assembly election representing the Praja Rajyam Party. He polled 48,747 votes and defeated his nearest rival, Kottu Satyanarayana of the Indian National Congress, by 3020 votes. He later shifted to the Telugu Desam Party and contested the 2019 Andhra Pradesh Legislative Assembly election on TDP ticket but lost to Kottu Satyanarayana, who won on a YSR Congress Party ticket. Rao garnered 54,275 votes and lost by 16,466 votes. In March 2024, he quit TDP and joined the YSR Congress Party after he was denied a ticket to contest the 2024 elections.
