= First Y. S. Rajasekhara Reddy ministry =

Andhra Pradesh Council of Ministers headed by Y. S. Rajasekhara Reddy (2004–2009)

- 22nd Ministry of Andhra Pradesh

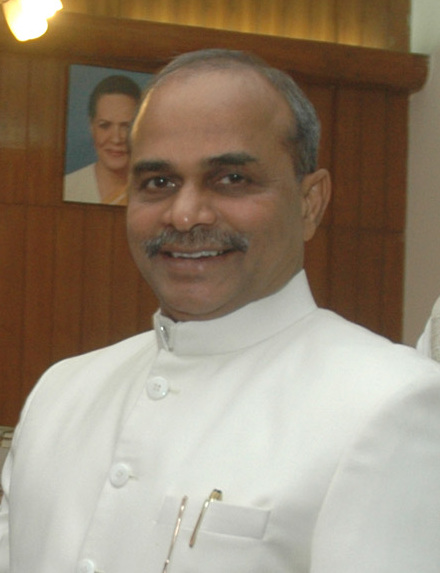
- Y. S. Rajasekhara Reddy
- Date formed: 14 May 2004
- Date dissolved: 20 May 2009

People and organisations
- Governor: Surjit Singh Barnala; Sushilkumar Shinde; Rameshwar Thakur; N. D. Tiwari
- Chief Minister: Y. S. Rajasekhara Reddy
- Member parties: United Progressive Alliance: Indian National Congress; Telangana Rashtra Samithi
- Status in legislature: Majority
- Opposition party: Telugu Desam Party
- Opposition leader: N. Chandrababu Naidu (Leader of the opposition)

History
- Election: 2004
- Outgoing election: 1999
- Legislature term: 5 years
- Predecessor: Second N. Chandrababu Naidu ministry
- Successor: Second Y. S. Rajasekhara Reddy ministry

The First Y. S. Rajasekhara Reddy ministry (or also known as 22nd ministry of Andhra Pradesh) of the state of Andhra Pradesh was formed on 14 May 2004 headed by Y. S. Rajasekhara Reddy as the Chief Minister following the 2004 Andhra Pradesh Legislative Assembly election. 24 member ministry was formed on 22 May 2004.

The council of ministry was initially formed with 25 members including the chief minister. Later expanded on 26 April 2007 with 17 members taking the total number of members in the council to 41.

== Background ==
Prior to 2004 Andhra Pradesh Legislative Assembly elections a pre-poll alliance was formed by the Indian National Congress, Telangana Rashtra Samithi, Communist Party of India and Communist Party of India (Marxist) to contest in the elections against the sole incumbent contender Telugu Desam Party. The pre-poll alliance succeeded in forming a new government in the state of Andhra Pradesh. Y. S. Rajasekhara Reddy formed a council of ministers consisting of 24 members initially and later expanding it twice once to induct the alliance partner TRS into the cabinet and several other members. Pre-poll partner TRS joined the government with six ministers and quit the government later citing differences due to the Telangana issue with the Indian National Congress.

== Council of Ministers ==
Key

- ^{RES} Resigned from office

Portfolio	Minister	Constituency	Tenure		Party
Portfolio	Minister	Constituency	Took office	Left office	Party
Chief Minister
General Administration, Law & Order and Other Portfolios not allocated to a Minister.	Y. S. Rajasekhara Reddy	Pulivendla	14 May 2004	20 May 2009	INC
Cabinet Ministers
Higher Education	Dharmapuri Srinivas	Nizamabad	14 May 2004	20 May 2009	INC
Home affairs, Jails, Fire services, NCC, Sainik Welfare, Film Development Corporation and Cinematography	Meneni Satyanarayana Rao	Karimnagar	14 May 2004	20 May 2009	INC
Municipal Administration and Urban Development	Koneru Ranga Rao	Tiruvuru	14 May 2004	20 May 2009	INC
Forests, Environment, Science & Technology	Satrucharla Vijaya Rama Raju	Parvathipuram	14 May 2004	20 May 2009	INC
Housing, Weaker Section Housing Program, AP Cooperative Housing Societies Federation and Housing Board	Botcha Satyanarayana	Cheepurupalli	14 May 2004	20 May 2009	INC
Commercial Taxes	Konathala Ramakrishna	Anakapalle	14 May 2004	20 May 2009	INC
Finance, Planning, Small Savings, Lotteries and Legislative Affairs	Konijeti Rosaiah	Chirala	14 May 2004	20 May 2009	INC
Transport	Kanna Lakshminarayana	Pedakurapadu	14 May 2004	20 May 2009	INC
Revenue, Relief & Rehabilitation and Urban Land Ceiling	Dharmana Prasada Rao	Narasannapeta	14 May 2004	20 May 2009	INC
Panchayat Raj	J. C. Diwakar Reddy	Tadipatri	14 May 2004	20 May 2009	INC
Agriculture, Agriculture Technology Mission, Horticulture, Seiculture, Rainshadow Area Development	Raghu Veera Reddy	Madakasira	14 May 2004	20 May 2009	INC
Energy, Coal, Minorities Welfare, Wakf, Urdu Academy	Mohammed Ali Shabbir	Kamareddy	14 May 2004	20 May 2009	INC
Home, Jails, Fire Service, Sainik Welfare, Printing & Stationery	Kunduru Jana Reddy	Nagarjuna Sagar	14 May 2004	20 May 2009	INC
Major & Medium Irrigation	Ponnala Lakshmaiah	Jangaon	14 May 2004	20 May 2009	INC
Major Industries, Sugar, Commerce & Export Promotion	J. Geeta Reddy	Gajwel	14 May 2004	20 May 2009	INC
Small Scale Industries, Khadi & Village Industries Board	Gollapalli Surya Rao	Allavaram	14 May 2004	20 May 2009	INC
Rural Water Supply	Pinnamaneni Venkateswara Rao	Mudinepalli	14 May 2004	20 May 2009	INC
Excise and Prohibition	Jakkampudi Rammohan Rao	Kadiam	14 May 2004	20 May 2009	INC
Women Development & Child Welfare, Disabled Welfare and Juvenile Welfare	Nedurumalli Rajya Lakshmi	Venkatagiri	14 May 2004	20 May 2009	INC
Marketing and Warehousing	M. Mareppa	Alur	14 May 2004	20 May 2009	INC
Mines & Geology, Handlooms & Textiles, Spinning Mills	Sabitha Indra Reddy	Chevella	14 May 2004	20 May 2009	INC
Cooperation	Mohammed Fareeduddin	Zahirabad	14 May 2004	20 May 2009	INC
Labour & Employment, Factories & Boilers	Gaddam Vinod Kumar	Chennur	14 May 2004	20 May 2009	INC
Tribal Welfare, Remote and Interior Areas Development	D. S. Redya Naik	Dornakal (ST)	14 May 2004	20 May 2009	INC
	Nayani Narasimha Reddy	Musheerabad	23 June 2004	4 July 2005 ^{RES}	TRS
	T. Harish Rao	Siddipet	23 June 2004	4 July 2005 ^{RES}	TRS
	A. Chandra Shekar	Vikarabad	23 June 2004	4 July 2005 ^{RES}	TRS
	G. Vijayarama Rao	Ghanpur (Station)	23 June 2004	4 July 2005 ^{RES}	TRS
	Voditela Lakshmikantha Rao	Huzurabad	23 June 2004	4 July 2005 ^{RES}	TRS
Transport	Sanigaram Santosh Reddy	Armur	23 June 2004	13 July 2005 ^{RES}	TRS
Medical Education & Health Insurance	Galla Aruna Kumari	Chandragiri	26 April 2007	20 May 2009	INC
Animal Husbandry, Dairy Development, Veterinary University, Fisheries	Mandali Buddha Prasad	Avanigadda	26 April 2007	20 May 2009	INC
Health & Family Welfare	Sambani Chandrasekhar	Palair	26 April 2007	20 May 2009	INC
Law & Courts, Technical Education and Industrial Training Institutes	R. Changa Reddy	Nagari	26 April 2007	20 May 2009	INC
Rural Development, NREGP, Self Help Groups	G. Chinna Reddy	Wanaparthy	26 April 2007	20 May 2009	INC
School Education, Govt. Examinations, SCERT, Text Book Press, Residential Schools Society, Hyderabad Public School	Damodar Raja Narasimha	Andole (SC)	26 April 2007	20 May 2009	INC
Information Technology & Communications, Youth Services and Sports	Komatireddy Venkat Reddy	Nalgonda	26 April 2007	20 May 2009	INC
Sarva Siksha Abhiyan, DPEP, Adult Education, Open Schools, Public Libraries, Jawahar Bal Bhavan, Mahila Samata Society, State Institute of Education Technology	M. Hanumantha Rao	Mangalagiri	26 April 2007	20 May 2009	INC
BC Welfare	Mukesh Goud	Maharajgunj	26 April 2007	20 May 2009	INC
Roads & Buildings	T. Jeevan Reddy	Jagtial	26 April 2007	20 May 2009	INC
Information& Public Relation, Cinematography, Tourism, Culture, Archaeology and Museums, Archives	Anam Ramanarayana Reddy	Rapur	26 April 2007	20 May 2009	INC
Endowments, Stamps & Registration	J. Ratnakar Rao	Buggaram	26 April 2007	20 May 2009	INC
Social Welfare	Pilli Subhash Chandra Bose	Ramachandrapuram	26 April 2007	20 May 2009	INC
Food, Civil Supplies, Legal Metrology, Consumer Affairs	K. Venkata Krishna Reddy	Narasaraopet	26 April 2007	20 May 2009	INC
Infrastructure & Investment, Ports, Airports, Natural Gas	Mopidevi Venkataramana	Kuchinapudi	26 April 2007	20 May 2009	INC
Vaidya Vidhana Parishad and Hospital Services	Vanama Venkateshwara Rao	Kothagudem	26 April 2007	20 May 2009	INC
Minor Irrigation, APIDC, Lift Irrigation, AP Water Resource Dev Corporation, WALAMTARI, Ground Water Development	Maganti Venkateswara Rao	Denduluru	26 April 2007	20 May 2009	INC

== See also ==
- Andhra Pradesh Council of Ministers
- Second N. Chandrababu Naidu ministry
- Second Y. S. Rajasekhara Reddy ministry
