= Anam Ramanarayana Reddy =

Indian politician

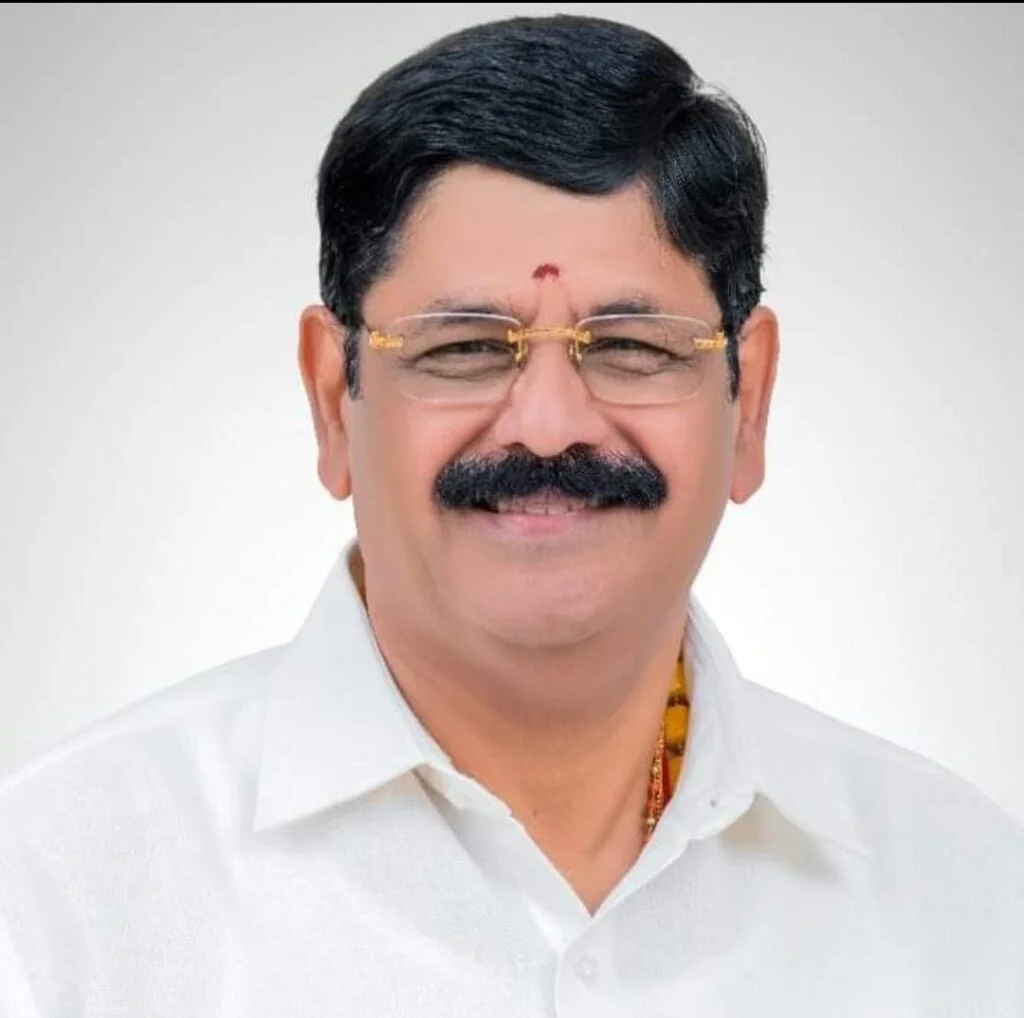

Minister of Endowments Government of Andhra Pradesh
- Incumbent
- Assumed office 12 June 2024
- Governor: S. Abdul Nazeer
- Chief Minister: N. Chandrababu Naidu
- Preceded by: Dharmana Prasada Rao

Minister of Finance Government of Andhra Pradesh
- In office 25 November 2010 – 21 February 2014
- Governor: E. S. L. Narasimhan
- Chief Minister: Kiran Kumar Reddy
- Preceded by: Konijeti Rosaiah
- Succeeded by: Yanamala Rama Krishnudu

Minister of Municipal Administration & Urban Development Government of Andhra Pradesh
- In office 5 July 2009 – 24 November 2010
- Governor: N. D. Tiwari; E. S. L. Narasimhan
- Chief Minister: Y. S. Rajasekhara Reddy; Konijeti Rosaiah
- Preceded by: Koneru Ranga Rao
- Succeeded by: Manugunta Maheedhar Reddy

Minister of Information& Public Relation, Cinematography, Tourism, Museums & Archives Government of Andhra Pradesh
- In office 26 April 2007 – 20 May 2009
- Governor: N. D. Tiwari
- Chief Minister: Y. S. Rajasekhara Reddy
- Preceded by: Voditela Lakshmikantha Rao
- Succeeded by: J. Geeta Reddy

Minister of Roads & Buildings Government of Andhra Pradesh
- In office 16 September 1984 – 2 December 1989
- Governor: Shankar Dayal Sharma; Kumudben Joshi
- Chief Minister: N. T. Rama Rao
- Preceded by: Himself
- In office 10 January 1983 – 15 August 1984
- Governor: K. C. Abraham; Thakur Ramlal
- Chief Minister: N. T. Rama Rao
- Succeeded by: Himself

Member of Legislative Assembly Andhra Pradesh
- Incumbent
- Assumed office 2024
- Preceded by: Mekapati Vikram Reddy
- Constituency: Atmakur
- In office 2019–2024
- Preceded by: Kurugondla Ramakrishna
- Succeeded by: Kurugondla Ramakrishna
- Constituency: Venkatagiri
- In office 2009–2014
- Preceded by: Kommi Lakshmaiah Naidu
- Succeeded by: Mekapati Goutham Reddy
- Constituency: Atmakuru
- In office 1999–2009
- Preceded by: Y. Srinivasulu Reddy
- Succeeded by: Constituency Abolished
- Constituency: Rapur
- In office 1985–1989
- Preceded by: Malireddy Adinarayan Reddy
- Succeeded by: Nuvvula Venkatraman Naidu
- Constituency: Rapur
- In office 1983–1985
- Preceded by: Kunam Venkata Subba Reddy
- Succeeded by: Kunam Venkata Subba Reddy
- Constituency: Nellore (Abolished Constituency as prer 2002 Delimitation Act)

Personal details
- Born: 10 July 1952 (age 74) Nellore, Madras State, India present day Nellore district, Andhra Pradesh
- Party: Telugu Desam Party (until 1991; 2016–2018; since 2023)
- Other political affiliations: YSR Congress Party (2018–2023); Indian National Congress (1991–2016)
- Education: Andhra University

Anam Ramanarayana Reddy (born 10 July 1952) is an Indian politician. He is currently serving as the cabinet minister in the Government of Andhra Pradesh and also Member of Legislative Assembly from Atmakur Assembly constituency. Previously, he has held several ministerial positions in the Andhra Pradesh state cabinet.

== Early life ==
Ramanarayana Reddy Anam was born in Nellore to Venkata Reddy Anam. He is the brother of Anam Vivekananda Reddy who was also a politician. He was educated at St.Joseph's English Medium High School and was awarded B.Com and B.L. degrees from Andhra University.

== Political career ==
In 1983, Reddy was first elected to the Legislative Assembly of Andhra Pradesh from the Nellore assembly constituency (dissolved in 2007 via 2002 Delimitation ACT) as a Telugu Desam Party candidate. He served as Minister for Roads and Buildings during First N. T. Rama Rao ministry.

In 1985, he switched and was elected to the Legislative Assembly of Andhra Pradesh from the Rapur Assembly constituency in Nellore district. Again, he served as Minister for Roads and Buildings during Second N. T. Rama Rao ministry.

In 1991, he joined the Indian National Congress.

In 1999, he contested and was elected from Rapur Assembly constituency for the 1999 Andhra Pradesh Legislative Assembly election.

In 2004, he contested and was elected again from Rapur Assembly constituency for the 2004 Andhra Pradesh Legislative Assembly election. And in 2007, Reddy was appointed State Minister for Information and Public Relations during First Y. S. Rajasekhara Reddy ministry which he held until 2009.

In 2009, as a consequence of delimitation coming into force he switched and was elected from Atmakur Assembly constituency for the 2009 Andhra Pradesh Legislative Assembly election. And in July 2009, he was appointed State Minister for Municipal Administration and Urban Development during Second Y. S. Rajasekhara Reddy ministry which he held until 2010.

In 2010, he was the State Minister for Finance and Planning during Kiran Kumar Reddy ministry.

In 2016 he joined the Telugu Desam Party along with his brother Anam Vivekananda Reddy.

In 2018, he left Telugu Desam Party and joined YSR Congress Party in the presence of YS Jagan Mohan Reddy.

In 2019, he again switched and was elected from Venkatagiri Assembly constituency for the 2019 Andhra Pradesh Legislative Assembly election.

In 2023, he was suspended from YSR Congress Party, as he was in favor of Telugu Desam Party.

in 2024, he contested and was elected as a Member of Legislative Assembly from Atmakur Assembly constituency as a Telugu Desam Party candidate for 2024 Andhra Pradesh Legislative Assembly election after nearly 3 decades.

== Election statistics ==
	Year	Contested For	Party	Constituency	Opponent	Votes	Majority	Result
1	1983	MLA	Telugu Desam Party	Nellore	Kunam Venkata Subba Reddy (INC)	51,613 - 22,068	+29,545	Won
2	1985	MLA	Telugu Desam Party	Nellore	Nuvvala Venkata Ratnam Naidu (INC)	39,427 - 34,515	+4,912	Won
3	1989	MLA	Telugu Desam Party	Rapur	Nuvvala Venkata Ratnam Naidu (INC)	53,331- 57,985	-4,654	Lost
4	1994	MLA	Indian National Congress	Rapur	Yellasiri Sreenivasulu Reddy (TDP)	43,791 - 52,180	-8,389	Lost
5	1999	MLA	Indian National Congress	Rapur	Yellasiri Srinivasulu Reddy (TDP)	59,127 - 52,999	+6,128	Won
6	2004	MLA	Indian National Congress	Rapur	Yellasiri Srinivasulu Reddy (TDP)	67,607 - 61,769	+5,838	Won
7	2009	MLA	Indian National Congress	Atmakur	Kommi Lakshmaiah Naidu (TDP)	76,907 - 58,263	+18,644	Won
8	2014	MLA	Indian National Congress	Atmakur	Mekapati Goutham Reddy (YSRCP)	8,927 - 91,686	-82,729	Lost
9	2019	MLA	YSR Congress Party	Venkatagiri	Kurugondla Ramakrishna (TDP)	1,09,204 - 70,484	+38,720	Won
10	2024	MLA	Telugu Desam Party	Atmakur	Mekapati Vikram Reddy (YSRCP)	91,165 - 83,589	+7,576	Won
