= Mekapati =

Mekapati is a Telugu surname. Notable people with the family name include:

- Mekapati Rajamohan Reddy (born 1944), Indian politician
- Mekapati Goutham Reddy (1971–2022), Indian politician and son of Rajamohan Reddy
