= Bommireddy Sundara Rami Reddy =

Indian politician (1935–2020)

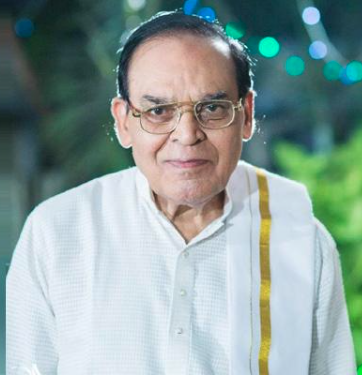

Andhra Pradesh Legislative Assembly
- In office 1978–1983
- Preceded by: Kancharla Srihari Naidu
- Succeeded by: Anam Venkata Reddy
- Constituency: Atmakur
- In office 1985–1994
- Preceded by: Anam Venkata Reddy
- Succeeded by: Kommi Lakshmaiah Naidu
- Constituency: Atmakur

Personal details
- Born: 17 October 1935
- Died: 6 February 2020 (aged 84)
- Political party: Indian National Congress

Bommireddy Sundara Rami Reddy (17 October 1935 – 6 February 2020) was an Indian physician and politician from Andhra Pradesh belonging to Indian National Congress. He was elected thrice as a legislator of the Andhra Pradesh Legislative Assembly.

== Biography ==
Rami Reddy was born on 17 October 1935. He received his MBBS degree from Chennai. Later, he joined government service. He opened his clinic in 1970.

Rami Reddy was elected as a legislator of the Andhra Pradesh Legislative Assembly from Atmakur in 1978. He was also elected from that constituency in 1985 and 1989. In 1985 he beat Venkaiah Naidu in the election. His son Bommireddy Raghavendra Reddy is a former member of the Andhra Pradesh Legislative Council.

Rami Reddy died on 6 February 2020 at the age of 84.
