= Kurugondla Ramakrishna =

Indian politician

Member of the Andhra Pradesh Legislative Assembly
- Incumbent
- Assumed office 2024
- Preceded by: Anam Ramanarayana Reddy
- Constituency: Venkatagiri

Personal details
- Party: Telugu Desam Party

Kurugondla Ramakrishna (born 1964) is the Telugu Desam Party member of the Andhra Pradesh Legislative Assembly representing Venkatagiri constituency, Nellore district. He retained his seat in the 2014 election.
