= Kottu Satyanarayana =

Indian politician

10th Deputy Chief Minister of Andhra Pradesh
- In office 11 April 2022 – 11 June 2024 Serving with Amzath Basha Shaik Bepari; Budi Mutyala Naidu; K. Narayana Swamy; Rajanna Dora Peedika
- Governor: Biswabhusan Harichandan; S. Abdul Nazeer
- Chief Minister: Y. S. Jagan Mohan Reddy
- Preceded by: Alla Nani; K. Narayana Swamy; Pilli Subhash Chandra Bose; Pamula Pushpa Sreevani; Dharmana Krishna Das
- Succeeded by: Konidela Pawan Kalyan

Minister for Endowments Government of Andhra Pradesh
- In office 11 April 2022 – 04 June 2024
- Governor: Biswabhusan Harichandan; S. Abdul Nazeer
- Chief Minister: Y. S. Jagan Mohan Reddy
- Preceded by: Vellampalli Srinivas

Member of Legislative Assembly Andhra Pradesh
- In office 2019-2024
- Preceded by: Pydikondala Manikyala Rao
- Succeeded by: Bolisetti Srinivas
- Constituency: Tadepalligudem
- In office 2004 - 2009
- Preceded by: Yerra Narayanswamy
- Succeeded by: Eli Venkata Madusudan Rao (Nani)
- Constituency: Tadepalligudem

Personal details
- Born: Tadepalligudem, Andhra Pradesh, India
- Occupation: Politician

Kottu Satyanarayana is an Indian politician. He was the 10th Deputy Chief Minister and Endowments minister of Andhra Pradesh from 11 April 2022. He represents Tadepalligudem constituency in 2019 Andhra Pradesh Legislative Assembly. He also served as Tadepalligudem MLA from 2004 to 2009.

== Early life ==
Kottu Satyanarayana was born in Tadepalligudem in West Godavari district of Andhra Pradesh. He completed his intermediate education at D. R. G. Government College, Pentapadu. He is married to Soudhani Kumari.

== Career ==
Kottu Satyanarayana contested from the Congress party in the 1994 and 1999 Andhra Pradesh Legislative Assembly elections but did not win. He was elected to the assembly for the first time in the 2004 elections with a majority of 24,933 votes against his nearest rival, the TDP candidate Pasala Kanakasundaram Rao. He has served as a member of the PCC, member of Assurance Committee of Andhra Pradesh Legislative, and member of House Committee Irregularities of Milk Dairies.

Satyanarayana has contested from Congress in 2009 and as an independent candidate in 2014, but lost both times. In the 2019 Assembly elections, he was elected as an MLA for the second time with a majority of 16,466 votes against his nearest rival TDP candidate Eeli Venkata Madhusudhana Rao (Eeli Nani). He was inducted into the Y. S. Jaganmohan Reddy ministry on April 11, 2022, and was sworn in as the Deputy Chief Minister and Endowments minister of Andhra Pradesh.
