= Venkatagiri Assembly constituency =

Constituency of the Andhra Pradesh Legislative Assembly, India

Coordinates: 13.96°N 79.58°E

Venkatagiri
- Constituency No. 122 for the Andhra Pradesh Legislative Assembly
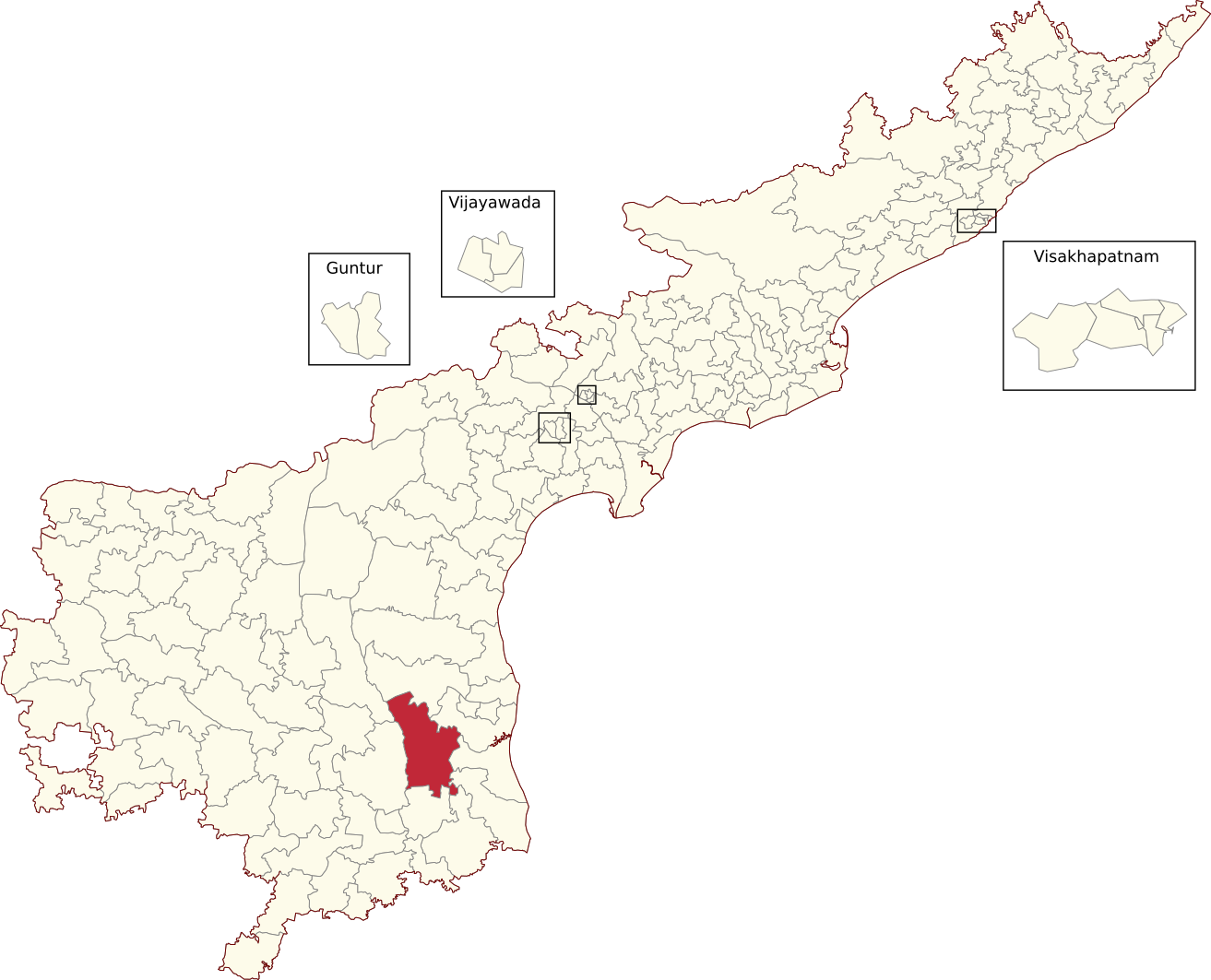
- Location of Venkatagiri Assembly constituency within Andhra Pradesh

Constituency details
- Country: India
- Region: South India
- State: Andhra Pradesh
- District: Tirupati (partially); Nellore (partially)
- Lok Sabha constituency: Tirupati
- Established: 1951
- Total electors: 240,253
- Reservation: None

Member of Legislative Assembly
- 16th Andhra Pradesh Legislative Assembly
- Incumbent Kurugondla Ramakrishna
- Party: TDP
- Alliance: NDA
- Elected year: 2024

Venkatagiri Assembly constituency is a constituency partially in Tirupati district and Nellore district of Andhra Pradesh that elects representatives to the Andhra Pradesh Legislative Assembly in India. It is one of the seven assembly segments of Tirupati Lok Sabha constituency.

Kurugondla Ramakrishna is the current MLA of the constituency, having won the 2024 Andhra Pradesh Legislative Assembly election from Telugu Desam Party. As of 2019, there a total of 240,253 electors in the constituency. The constituency was established in 1951, as per the Delimitation Orders (1951).

== Mandals ==
Mandal	Districts
Rapur	Nellore district
Sydapuram	Nellore district
Kaluvoya	Nellore district
Balayapalli	Tirupati district
Venkatagiri	Tirupati district
Dakkili	Tirupati district

== Members of the Legislative Assembly ==
Year	Member	Political party
1952	Padileti Venkataswami Reddy	Indian National Congress
1955	Padileti Venkataswami Reddy	Indian National Congress
1955	Kamatham Shanmugam	Indian National Congress
1956^	Allam Krishnaiah	Indian National Congress
1962	Allam Krishnaiah	Indian National Congress
1967	Orepalli Venkata Subbaiah	Independent
1972	Orepalli Venkaiasubbaiah	Indian National Congress
1978	Nallapareddy Srinivasulu Reddy	Indian National Congress
1983	Nallapareddy Chandrasekhara Reddy	Telugu Desam Party
1985	V. Bhaskara Saikrishna Yachendra	Telugu Desam Party
1989	Nedurumalli Janardhana Reddy	Indian National Congress
1994	Velugoti Raja V.V.R.K. Yachendra	Telugu Desam Party
1999	Nedurumalli Rajyalakshmi	Indian National Congress
2004	Nedurumalli Rajyalakshmi	Indian National Congress
2009	Kurugondla Ramakrishna	Telugu Desam Party
2014	Kurugondla Ramakrishna	Telugu Desam Party
2019	Anam Ramanarayana Reddy	YSR Congress Party
2024	Kurugondla Ramakrishna	Telugu Desam Party

^ indicates by-election

== Election results ==
=== 1952 ===
1952 Madras Legislative Assembly election: Venkatagiri
Party	Candidate	Votes	%	±%
INC	Padileti Venkatasami Reddi	23,557	48.19%	48.19%
KLP	Katikinani Kalyan Rao	17,463	35.72%	
KMPP	Aravadbhoomi Ramachandra Reddi	6,724	13.75%	
Independent	Yaganti Ramalingam	1,141	2.33%	
Margin of victory		6,094	12.47%	
Turnout		48,885	57.01%	
Registered electors		85,742		
INC win (new seat)				

=== 1999 ===
1999 Andhra Pradesh Legislative Assembly election: Venkatagiri
Party	Candidate	Votes	%	±%
INC	Nedurumalli Rajyalakshmi	48,876	45.32	
TDP	Sarada Thadiparthi	38,158	35.38	
Independent	Nallapareddy Rajendra Kumar Reddy	16,334	15.14	
Majority		10,718	9.94	
Turnout		1,07,854	76.53	
INC gain from TDP		Swing		

=== 2004 ===
2004 Andhra Pradesh Legislative Assembly election: Venkatagiri
Party	Candidate	Votes	%	±%
INC	Nedurumalli Rajyalakshmi	57,830	49.66	+4.34
TDP	Bhaskara Saikrishna Yachendra V	51,135	43.91	+8.53
Majority		6,695	5.75	
Turnout		116,450	78.98	+5.12
INC hold		Swing		

=== 2009 ===
2009 Andhra Pradesh Legislative Assembly election: Venkatagiri
Party	Candidate	Votes	%	±%
TDP	Kurugondla Ramakrishna	69,731	43.62	−0.29
INC	Nedurumalli Rajyalakshmi	62,965	39.39	−10.27
PRP	Meraga Murali Yadav	19,970	12.49	
Majority		6,766	4.23	
Turnout		159,851	76.72	−2.26
TDP gain from INC		Swing		

=== 2014 ===
2014 Andhra Pradesh Legislative Assembly election: Venkatagiri
Party	Candidate	Votes	%	±%
TDP	Kurugondla Ramakrishna	83,669	47.43	
YSRCP	Kommi Lakshmi Naidu	78,034	44.23	
Majority		5,635	3.20	
Turnout		176,417	81.68	+4.96
TDP hold		Swing		

=== 2019 ===
2019 Andhra Pradesh Legislative Assembly election: Venkatagiri
Party	Candidate	Votes	%	±%
YSRCP	Anam Ramanarayana Reddy	109,204	57.26	
TDP	Kurugondla Ramakrishna	70,484	36.96	
BSP	Pallipati Raja	2,253	1.18	
BJP	S. S. R. Naidu	1,700	0.89	
Majority		38,720	20.30	
Turnout		1,90,714	79.39	
YSRCP gain from TDP		Swing		

=== 2024 ===
2024 Andhra Pradesh Legislative Assembly election: Venkatagiri
Party	Candidate	Votes	%	±%
TDP	Kurugondla Ramakrishna	104,398	52.31	
YSRCP	Nedurumalli Ramkumar Reddy	88,104	44.15	
INC	Panta Srinivasulu	1,935	0.97	
NOTA	None Of The Above	3,037	1.52	
Majority		16,294	8.16	
Turnout		1,99,565		
TDP gain from YSRCP		Swing		

== See also ==
- List of constituencies of Andhra Pradesh Vidhan Sabha
