= Bolisetti Srinivas =

Indian politician

Member of Legislative Assembly, Andhra Pradesh
- Incumbent
- Assumed office 4 June 2024
- Preceded by: Kottu Satyanarayana
- Constituency: Tadepalligudem

Chairman of Tadepalligudem Municipality
- In office 2014–2018

Personal details
- Party: Janasena Party
- Other political affiliations: Telugu Desam Party

Bolisetti Srinivas is an Indian politician of the Jana Sena Party and a Member of Legislative Assembly to the 16th Andhra Pradesh Assembly from Tadepalligudem Assembly constituency. He won the Andhra Pradesh Legislative Assembly elections in 2024 and was appointed whip on 12 November 2024.
