= Mekapati Vikram Reddy =

Indian politician (born 1973)

Member of Legislative Assembly Andhra Pradesh
- Incumbent
- Assumed office 11 July 2022 – 4 June 2024
- Preceded by: Mekapati Goutham Reddy
- Succeeded by: Anam Ramanarayana Reddy
- Constituency: Atmakur

Personal details
- Born: 1973 (age 52–53)
- Party: YSR Congress Party
- Relations: Mekapati Goutham Reddy (brother)
- Parent(s): Mekapati Rajamohan Reddy (father); Mekapati Manimanjari (mother)
- Education: Master's Degree in Construction Management; IIT Madras

Mekapati Vikram Reddy is an Indian politician and former MLA who served as Member of 15th Andhra Pradesh Assembly from Atmakur Assembly constituency.

== Personal life ==
He was born in 1973. He is the younger brother of Mekapati Goutham Reddy and son of Mekapati Rajamohan Reddy. He graduated from IIT Madras and has Master's Degree in Construction Management. In June 2022, he was congratulated for joining the government by Y. S. Jagan Mohan Reddy, Chief Minister of Andhra Pradesh.
