= Eli Anjaneyulu =

Indian politician

Eli Anjaneyulu (born ) is an Indian politician from Andhra Pradesh. He is a former member of the Andhra Pradesh Legislative Assembly from the Tadepalligudem Assembly constituency in West Godavari district. He won as an independent candidate in 1972 and regained the seat on the Telugu Desam Party ticket in 1983.

== Early life ==
Anjaneyulu is from Tadepalligudem, West Godavari district, Andhra Pradesh. He married Eli Varalakshmi, who later became an MLA from Tadepalligudem. Their son Eli Venkata Madhusudhan Rao, alias Nani, was also elected as an MLA in 2009.

== Career ==
Anjaneyulu first became an MLA winning the Tadepalligudem Assembly constituency in the 1972 Andhra Pradesh Legislative Assembly election as an independent candidate. He regained the seat in the 1983 Andhra Pradesh Legislative Assembly election representing the Telugu Desam Party. In 1983, he polled 61,310 votes and defeated his nearest rival, Mylavarapu Rajabhaskararao of the Indian National Congress (Indira), by 42,694 votes. Earlier, he lost the 1978 Andhra Pradesh Legislative Assembly election to Chintalapati Seeta Rama Chandra Vara Prasada Murty Raju of the Congress (Indira), by 7,673 votes.

In 1983, he served as a minister in the NT Rama Rao cabinet.
