= Tadepalligudem bus station =

Bus station in Andhra Pradesh, India

General information
- Location: Tadepalligudem, West Godavari district, Andhra Pradesh; India
- Owner: Government of India
- Operator: APSRTC

Construction
- Structure type: Standard (On ground)
- Parking: Yes

Tadepalligudem bus station is a bus station located in the city of Tadepalligudem of the Indian state of Andhra Pradesh. It is owned and operated by Andhra Pradesh State Road Transport Corporation. The station is also equipped with a bus depot for storage and maintenance of buses. It operates buses to all parts of the district and also to the nearby cities like Eluru, Visakhapatnam, Vijayawada, Rajahmundry and Tanuku.
