= Atmakur Assembly constituency =

Constituency of the Andhra Pradesh Legislative Assembly, India

Coordinates: 15.88°N 78.58°E

Atmakur
- Constituency No. 115 for the Andhra Pradesh Legislative Assembly
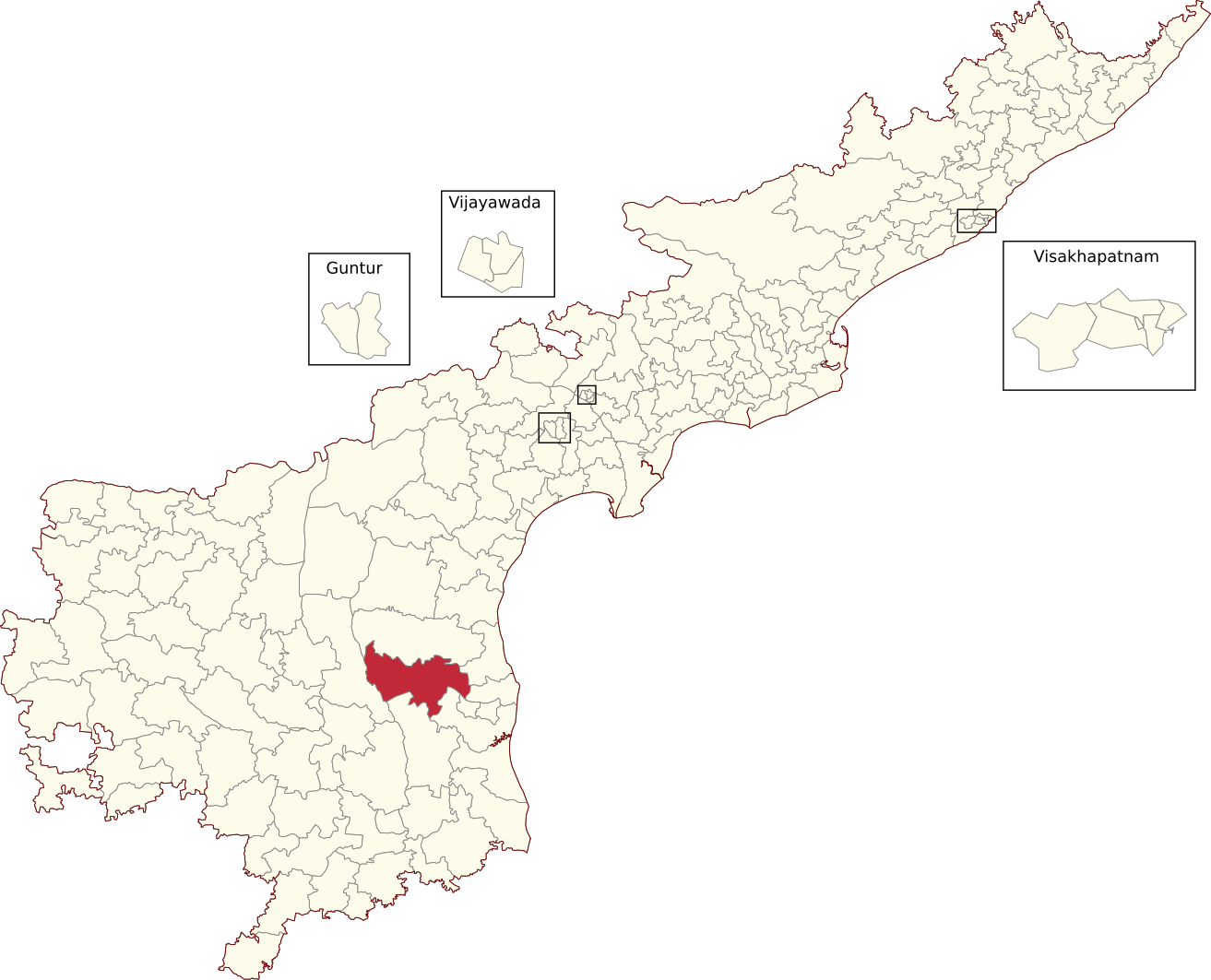
- Location of Atmakur Assembly constituency within Andhra Pradesh

Constituency details
- Country: India
- Region: South India
- State: Andhra Pradesh
- District: Nellore
- Lok Sabha constituency: Nellore
- Established: 1951
- Total electors: 208,990
- Reservation: None

Member of Legislative Assembly
- 16th Andhra Pradesh Legislative Assembly
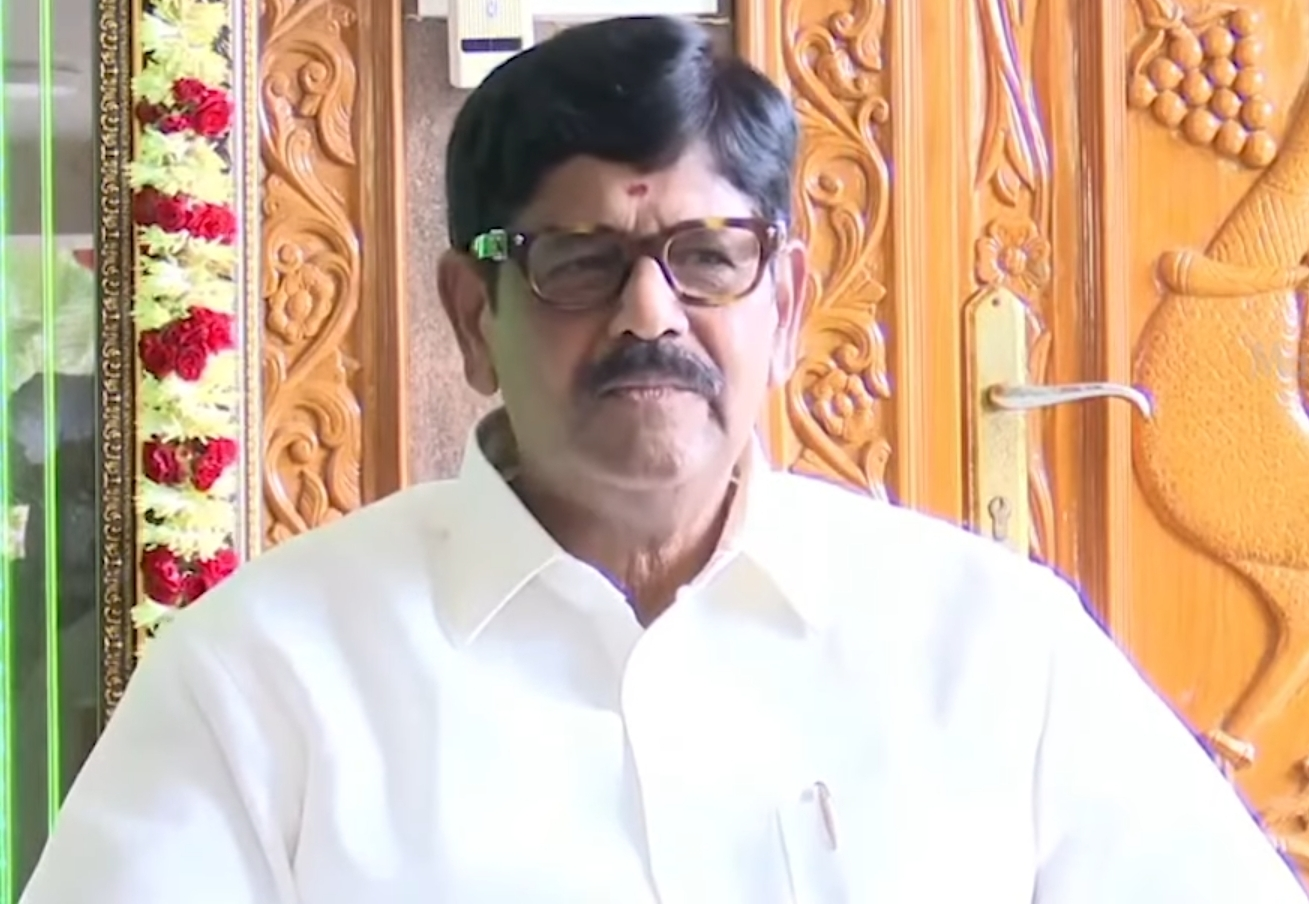
- Incumbent Anam Ramanarayana Reddy
- Party: TDP
- Alliance: NDA
- Elected year: 2024

Atmakur Assembly constituency is a constituency in Nellore district of Andhra Pradesh that elects representatives to the Andhra Pradesh Legislative Assembly in India. It is one of the seven assembly segments of Nellore Lok Sabha constituency.

Anam Ramanarayana Reddy is the current MLA of the constituency, having won the 2024 Andhra Pradesh Legislative Assembly election from Telugu Desam Party. As of 25 March 2019, there are a total of 208,990 electors in the constituency. The constituency was established in 1951, as per the Delimitation Orders (1951).

== Mandals ==
Mandal
Chejerla
Atmakur
Anumasamudrampeta
Marripadu
Sangam
Ananthasagaram

== Members of the Legislative Assembly ==
Year	Member	Political party
1952	Ganga China Kondayya	Independent
1955	Bezawada Gopala Reddy	Indian National Congress
1958*	Anam Sanjeeva Reddy	Indian National Congress
1962	Anam Sanjeeva Reddy	Indian National Congress
1967	Pellakure Ramachandra Reddy	Swatantra Party
1972	Kancharla Srihari Naidu	Indian National Congress
1978	Bommireddy Sundara Rami Reddy	Indian National Congress
1983	Anam Venkata Reddy	Telugu Desam Party
1985	Bommireddy Sundara Rami Reddy	Indian National Congress
1989	Bommireddy Sundara Rami Reddy	Indian National Congress
1994	Kommi Lakshmaiah Naidu	Telugu Desam Party
1999	Bollineni Krishnaiah	Indian National Congress
2004	Kommi Lakshmaiah Naidu	Independent
2009	Anam Ramanarayana Reddy	Indian National Congress
2014	Mekapati Goutham Reddy	YSR Congress Party
2019	Mekapati Goutham Reddy	YSR Congress Party
2022*	Mekapati Vikram Reddy	YSR Congress Party
2024	Anam Ramanarayana Reddy	Telugu Desam Party

*by-election

== Election results ==
=== 2024 ===
2024 Andhra Pradesh Legislative Assembly election: Atmakur
Party	Candidate	Votes	%	±%
TDP	Anam Ramanarayana Reddy	91,165	49.85	
YSRCP	Mekapati Vikram Reddy	83,589	45.70	
INC	Chevuru Sreedhara Reddy	2,915	1.59	
NOTA	None of the Above	2,347	1.28	
Majority		7,576	4.15	
Turnout		1,82,893		
TDP gain from YSRCP		Swing		

=== 2022 by-election ===
Mekapati Goutham Reddy, who was the Industries Minister, died on 21 February 2022 of a cardiac arrest. This warranted a by-election for the now vacant Atmakur consttiuency seat. The election was held on 23rd June, with the results being announced on 26th June. Mekapati Vikram Reddy, the brother of the previous MLA got close to 75% of the votes cast and therefore won the by-election.

2022 Andhra Pradesh Legislative Assembly by-election: Atmakur
Party	Candidate	Votes	%	±%
YSRCP	Mekapati Vikram Reddy	102,241	74.47	+21.25
BJP	Bharath Kumar Gundlapalli	19,353	14.10	+12.77
Majority		82,888	60.37	+47.6
Turnout		1,37,289	64.35	−19.03
Registered electors		2,13,338		
YSRCP hold		Swing		

=== 2019 ===
2019 Andhra Pradesh Legislative Assembly election: Atmakur
Party	Candidate	Votes	%	±%
YSRCP	Mekapati Goutham Reddy	92,758	53.22	
TDP	Bollineni Krishnayya	70,482	40.44	
Majority		22,276	12.93	
Turnout		1,74,509	83.48	+4.67
Registered electors		209,051		
YSRCP hold		Swing		

=== 2014 ===
2014 Andhra Pradesh Legislative Assembly election: Atmakur
Party	Candidate	Votes	%	±%
YSRCP	Mekapati Goutham Reddy	91,686	55.98	
TDP	Guturu Murali Kanna Babu	60,288	36.80	
Majority		31,412	19.18	
Turnout		163,788	78.63	+0.59
Registered electors		208,396		
YSRCP gain from INC		Swing		

=== 2009 ===
2009 Andhra Pradesh Legislative Assembly election: Atmakur
Party	Candidate	Votes	%	±%
INC	Anam Ramanarayana Reddy	76,907	51.92	24.58
TDP	Kommi Lakshmaiah Naidu	58,263	39.33	
PRP	Khajavali Shaik	8,772	5.92	
Majority		18,644	12.59	
Turnout		148,137	78.04	−2.86
Registered electors		189,820		
INC gain from Independent		Swing		

=== 2004 ===
2004 Andhra Pradesh Legislative Assembly election: Atmakur
Party	Candidate	Votes	%	±%
Independent	Kommi Lakshmaiah Naidu	43,347	36.25	
BJP	Bollineni Krishnaiah	38,950	32.58	
INC	Bommireddy Sundara Rami Reddy	32,686	27.34	
Majority		4,397	3.67	
Turnout		119,562	80.90	+10.29
Registered electors		147,793		
Independent gain from INC		Swing		

=== 1999 ===
1999 Andhra Pradesh Legislative Assembly election: Atmakur
Party	Candidate	Votes	%	±%
INC	Bollineni Krishnaiah	55,249	49.43%	
TDP	Lakshamaiah Naidu Kommi	53,180	47.58%	
Margin of victory		2,069	1.85%	
Turnout		115,503	72.97%	
Registered electors		158,292		
INC gain from TDP		Swing		

=== 1994 ===
1994 Andhra Pradesh Legislative Assembly election: Atmakur
Party	Candidate	Votes	%	±%
TDP	Lakshamaiah Naidu Kommi	59,166	54.73%	
INC	Bommireddy Sundara Rami Reddy	41,224	38.14%	
Margin of victory		17,942	16.60%	
Turnout		109,881	74.29%	
Registered electors		147,907		
TDP gain from INC		Swing		

=== 1989 ===
1989 Andhra Pradesh Legislative Assembly election: Atmakur
Party	Candidate	Votes	%	±%
INC	Bommireddy Sundara Rami Reddy	48,965	48.06%	
BJP	Karnati Anjaneya Reddy	48,631	47.74%	
Margin of victory		334	0.33%	
Turnout		102,745	64.97%	
Registered electors		158,153		
INC hold		Swing		

=== 1985 ===
1985 Andhra Pradesh Legislative Assembly election: Atmakur
Party	Candidate	Votes	%	±%
INC	Bommireddy Sundara Rami Reddy	46,105	49.31%	
BJP	Muppavarapu Venkaiah Naidu	45,275	48.42%	
Margin of victory		830	0.89%	
Turnout		94,680	71.38%	
Registered electors		132,642		
INC gain from TDP		Swing		

=== 1983 ===
1983 Andhra Pradesh Legislative Assembly election: Atmakur
Party	Candidate	Votes	%	±%
TDP	Anam Venkata Reddy	44,287	56.31%	
INC	Bommireddy Sundara Rami Reddy	30,038	38.20%	
Margin of victory		14,249	18.12%	
Turnout		81,221	65.68%	
Registered electors		123,669		
TDP gain from INC(I)		Swing		

=== 1978 ===
1978 Andhra Pradesh Legislative Assembly election: Atmakur
Party	Candidate	Votes	%	±%
INC(I)	Bommireddy Sundara Rami Reddy	36,045	43.86%	
JP	Ganga China Kondaiah	32,807	39.92%	
INC	Kancharla Srihari Naidu	13,336	16.23%	
Margin of victory		3,238	3.94%	
Turnout		83,662	73.61%	
Registered electors		113,656		
INC(I) gain from INC		Swing		

=== 1972 ===
1972 Andhra Pradesh Legislative Assembly election: Atmakur
Party	Candidate	Votes	%	±%
INC	Kancharla Srihari Naidu	30,349	53.86%	
Independent	Ganga China Kondaiah	25,009	44.39%	
Margin of victory		5,340	9.48%	
Turnout		57,559	66.10%	
Registered electors		87,074		
INC gain from SWA		Swing		

=== 1967 ===
1967 Andhra Pradesh Legislative Assembly election: Atmakur
Party	Candidate	Votes	%	±%
SWA	Pellakur Ramachandra Reddy	33,394	54.24%	
INC	Anam Sanjeeva Reddy	28,170	45.76%	
Margin of victory		5,224	8.49%	
Turnout		63,994	79.32%	
Registered electors		80,677		
SWA gain from INC		Swing		

=== 1962 ===
1962 Andhra Pradesh Legislative Assembly election: Atmakur
Party	Candidate	Votes	%	±%
INC	Anam Sanjeeva Reddy	31,445	57.97%	
SWA	Pellakur Ramachandra Reddy	22,798	42.03%	
Margin of victory		8,647	15.94%	
Turnout		55,357	75.99%	
Registered electors		72,850		
INC hold		Swing		

=== 1958 by-election ===
1958 Andhra Pradesh Legislative Assembly by-election: Atmakur
Party	Candidate	Votes	%	±%
INC	A.S. Reddy	22,380		
PSP	G.C. Kondaiah	22,351		
Independent	P.V. Ramachandrareddy	437		
Margin of victory		29		
Turnout				
INC hold		Swing		

=== 1955 ===
1955 Andhra State Legislative Assembly election: Atmakur
Party	Candidate	Votes	%	±%
INC	Bezawada Gopala Reddy	25,036	59.36%	
Independent	Ganga China Kondaiah	10,939	25.94%	
Margin of victory		14,097	33.43%	
Turnout		42,173	65.92%	
Registered electors		63,978		
INC gain from Independent		Swing		

=== 1952 ===
1952 Madras State Legislative Assembly election: Atmakur
Party	Candidate	Votes	%	±%
Independent	Ganga China Kondayya	20,682	66.20%	New
INC	Gangavarapu Thirupathi Naidu	10,561	33.80%	New
Margin of victory		10,121	32.39%	NA
Turnout		31,243	52.94%	New
Registered electors		59,022		NA
Independent win (new seat)				

== See also ==
- List of constituencies of Andhra Pradesh Vidhan Sabha
