= Mekapati Goutham Reddy =

Indian businessman and politician (1971–2022)

- Reddy in 2020

Minister for Industries, Commerce and Information Technology Government of Andhra Pradesh
- In office 19 June 2019 – 21 February 2022
- Governor: E. S. L. Narasimhan; Biswabhusan Harichandan
- Chief Minister: Y. S. Jagan Mohan Reddy
- Preceded by: Nara Lokesh
- Succeeded by: Gudivada Amarnath

Member of Legislative Assembly Andhra Pradesh
- In office 16 May 2014 – 21 February 2022
- Preceded by: Anam Ramanarayana Reddy
- Succeeded by: Mekapati Vikram Reddy
- Constituency: Atmakur

Personal details
- Born: 2 November 1971 Brahmanapalli, Andhra Pradesh, India
- Died: 21 February 2022 (aged 50) Hyderabad, Telangana, India
- Party: YSR Congress Party
- Spouse: Srikeerthi
- Children: 2
- Parent: Mekapati Rajamohan Reddy (father)
- Education: M.Sc
- Alma mater: University of Manchester
- Occupation: Businessman; Politician

Mekapati Goutham Reddy (2 November 1971 – 21 February 2022) was an Indian businessman and politician from the state of Andhra Pradesh. He was the Minister for Industries, Commerce, and Information Technology in the Government of Andhra Pradesh. He was elected twice and served as the Member of the Legislative Assembly (MLA) in the Andhra Pradesh Legislative Assembly representing the Atmakur Assembly constituency on behalf of YSR Congress Party from 2014 until his death in 2022.

As a minister, he made efforts in framing new policies in industrial and IT sectors. He viewed information technology (IT) to be the factor that would transform Andhra Pradesh to be a trillion-dollar economy. He led a delegation team to Dubai Expo 2020 in February 2022 in order to attract investments to the state.

Goutham Reddy died in 2022 due to a sudden cardiac arrest at the age of 50. After he just returned from the Dubai Expo 2020, he suffered the fatal event, marking a significant loss to Andhra Pradesh political landscape and its industrial sector.

== Personal life ==
Mekapati Goutham Reddy was born on 2 November 1971 to Mekapati Rajamohan Reddy and Mani Manjari. He hailed from Brahmanapalli village in Nellore district, Andhra Pradesh. He had two brothers, Prithvi Kumar Reddy and Vikram Reddy. His father, Rajamohan Reddy, was a former Member of Parliament of Nellore Lok Sabha constituency. His paternal uncle, Mekapati Chandrasekhar Reddy, is a politician and was a former Member of Legistalive Assembly representing Udayagiri Assembly constituency.

Reddy did his schooling in Good Shepherd International School in Ooty, Tamil Nadu and graduated from Badruka College of Commerce and Arts, Hyderabad. He pursued his Master's degree in Apparel and Textiles during 1994 and 1997 from the University of Manchester, United Kingdom. He was married to Srikeerthi and the couple had two children, a son and a daughter. He was tested positive for COVID-19 twice, once in April 2021 and later in January 2022.

== Business career ==
Reddy had been managing KMC Constructions since his post-graduation in 1997. He, along with his family, had controlling shares in several companies including KMC Constructions, KMC Road Holdings, KMC Infratech, Guruvayoor Infrastructure, Brindavan Infrastructure, Krishnarjuna Real Estates, Andaman Angling Agency, Pink City Expressway, Rayalaseema Expressway and North Malabar Expressway. These companies operate in road construction, real estate and infrastructure sectors.

== Political career ==
Reddy started his political career in 2014 contesting from the Atmakur constituency on behalf of YSR Congress Party. He won the 2014 election as the MLA against the incumbent Anam Ramanarayana Reddy of Indian National Congress and defeated his closest opponent, GM Kanna Babu, of the Telugu Desam Party (TDP) with a majority of 31,412 votes polled for him.

In 2019 election, he contested again from Atmakur constituency and won as the MLA against his close opponent, Bollineni Krishnaiah of TDP. He declared assets of ₹61 crore (US$7.2 million) in the affidavit submitted for the election. In June 2019, he joined the state government's cabinet and was given the portfolio of Industries, Commerce, and Information Technology.

In April 2021, his Twitter account was hacked and malicious messages were tweeted.

== Minister for Industries, Commerce, and IT (2019–2022) ==
=== Policies and investments ===
During his term as a minister, Reddy was instrumental in framing new policies such as AP Industrial Development Policy 2020-23, YSR EMC Kopparthy Electronics policy, Jagannana YSR Kopparthy Mega Industrial Hub Policy 2020 and AP IT Policy 2021-24. According to Reddy, Andhra Pradesh had attracted investments worth ₹29,780 crore (US$3.5 billion) from 65 large and mega industries between June 2019 and May 2021 during his term. Following the criticism by the opposition Telugu Desam Party (TDP), Reddy took to Twitter and shared the details of the investments.

In 2020, Andhra Pradesh retained the top rank in ease of doing business among the Indian states following his initiatives.

He invited the Government of Western Australia to explore investment and growth opportunities in the state, while addressing a 2021 virtual summit held with their government officials. He suggested mining, infrastructure, skills development, IT and manufacturing sectors would be the potential areas for collaboration between the two governments.

=== Dubai Expo 2020 ===
In February 2022, Reddy led the Andhra Pradesh government's delegation in his ministerial capacity at Dubai Expo 2020, where the state government had a stall at India's pavilion. He laid a pitch to the attendance projecting Andhra Pradesh as a resourceful and business-friendly state and established it as a destination for businesses. The visit resulted in investment offers worth ₹10,350 crore (US$1.2 billion) to the state and memorandum of understandings with several companies with an intent to invest over ₹5,150 crore (US$610 million).

=== Views on IT ===
Reddy envisioned information technology (IT) to empower Andhra Pradesh in becoming an incubation hub and transform the state into a trillion dollar economy. At Dubai Expo 2020, he strived to bring investments into the state in the IT sector.

== Death ==
Reddy died on 21 February 2022 due to a heart attack in Hyderabad, caused by post COVID-19 complications. Despite resuscitation efforts of conducting CPR for more than 90 minutes at Apollo Hospitals in Jubilee Hills, he could not be revived. In the wake of his death, the makers of the movie Bheemla Nayak postponed their pre-release event as a sign of respect. The state government announced a two-day state mourning period. The last rites were performed on 23 February with state honours at Mekapati Rajmohan Reddy Institute of Technology and Science in Udayagiri, Nellore district.
