= Tadepalligudem Assembly constituency =

Constituency of the Andhra Pradesh Legislative Assembly, India

Coordinates: 16.81°N 81.53°E

Tadepalligudem
- Constituency No. 62 for the Andhra Pradesh Legislative Assembly
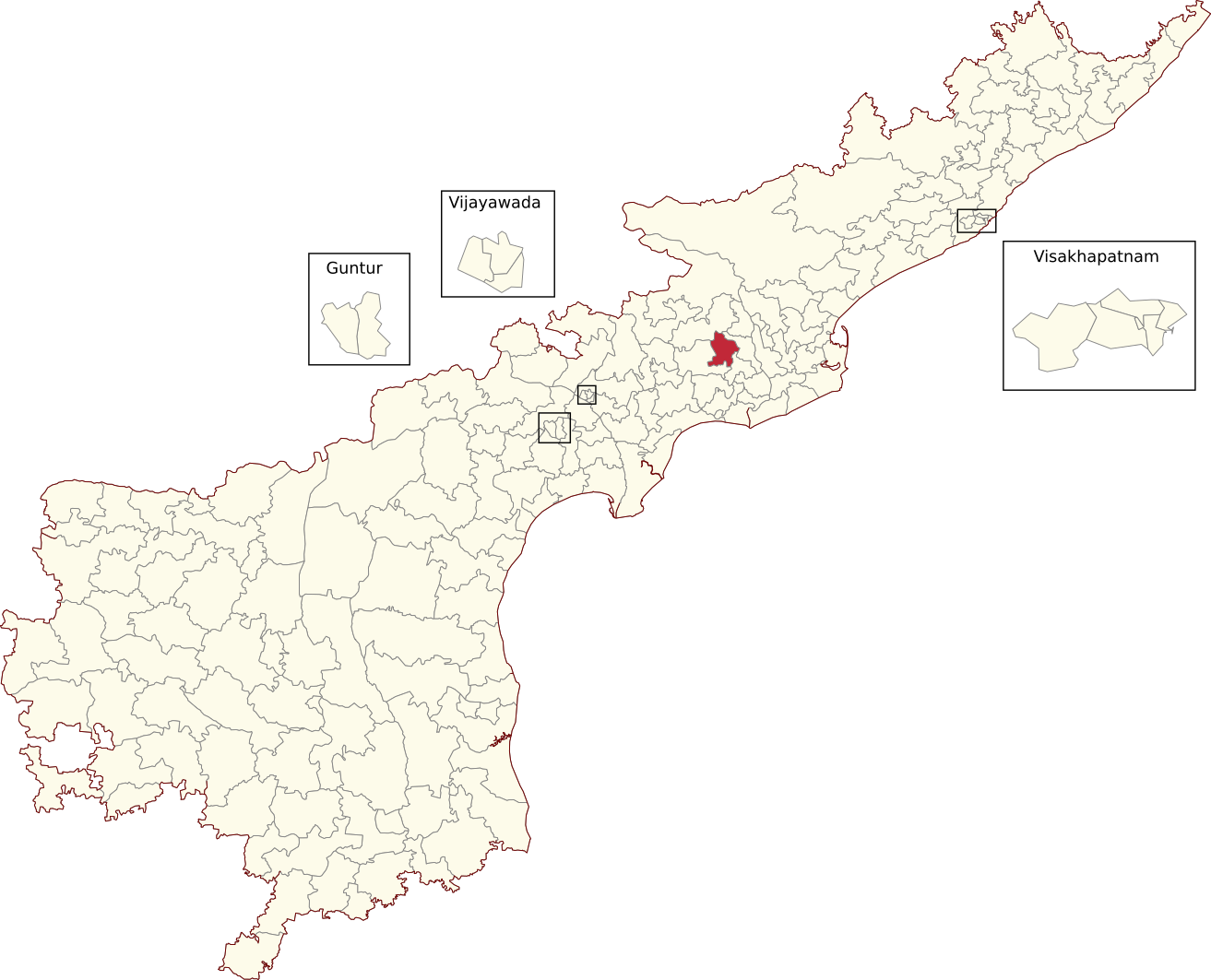
- Location of Tadepalligudem Assembly constituency within Andhra Pradesh

Constituency details
- Country: India
- Region: South India
- State: Andhra Pradesh
- District: West Godavari
- Lok Sabha constituency: Narasapuram
- Established: 1951
- Total electors: 208,490
- Reservation: None

Member of Legislative Assembly
- 16th Andhra Pradesh Legislative Assembly
- Incumbent Bolisetti Srinivas
- Party: JSP
- Alliance: NDA
- Elected year: 2024

Tadepalligudem Assembly constituency is a constituency in West Godavari district of Andhra Pradesh that elects representatives to the Andhra Pradesh Legislative Assembly in India. It is one of the seven assembly segments of Narasapuram Lok Sabha constituency.

Bolisetti Srinivas is the current MLA of the constituency, having won the 2024 Andhra Pradesh Legislative Assembly election from Jana Sena Party. As of 2019, there are a total of 208,490 electors in the constituency. The constituency was established in 1951, as per the Delimitation Orders (1951).

== Mandals ==
The two mandals that form the assembly constituency are:

Mandal
Tadepalligudem
Pentapadu

== Members of the Legislative Assembly ==
Year	Member	Political party
1952	C. S. Varaparasadamurthiraju	Indian National Congress
1955	Namburi Srinivasarao	Indian National Congress
1962	Alliuri Krishna Rao	Indian National Congress
1967	Alliuri Krishna Rao	Indian National Congress
1972	Eli Anjaneyulu	Independent
1978	C. S. R. C. V. Prasada Murty Raju	Indian National Congress (I)
1983	Eli Anjaneyulu	Telugu Desam Party
1983^	Eli Varalakshmi	Telugu Desam Party
1985	Yerra Narayana Swamy (Benarji)	Telugu Desam Party
1987 by-election	Eli Varalakshmi	Indian National Congress
1989	Kanaka Sundara Rao Pasala	Telugu Desam Party
1994	Kanaka Sundara Rao Pasala	Telugu Desam Party
1999	Yarra Narayanaswamy	Telugu Desam Party
2004	Kottu Satyanarayana	Indian National Congress
2009	Eli Venkata Madhusudhan Rao (Nani)	Praja Rajyam Party
2014	Pydikondala Manikyala Rao	Bharatiya Janata Party
2019	Kottu Satyanarayana	YSR Congress Party
2024	Bolisetti Srinivas	Janasena Party

== Election results ==
=== 1952 ===
1952 Madras Legislative Assembly election : Tadepalligudem
Party	Candidate	Votes	%	±%
INC	C. S. Varaparasadamurthiraju	19,844	44.90	44.90
KMPP	Kilambi Venkata Krishna Vataram	19,355	43.79	
Independent	Kediyala Rajagopala Rao	1,452	3.29	
Independent	B. Ramalingeswara Rao	1,375	3.11	
Independent	Athuri Raghava Rao	1,265	2.86	
Independent	Ravipati Veera Rama Rao	908	2.05	
Margin of victory		489	1.11	
Turnout		44,199	70.35	
Registered electors		62,823		
INC win (new seat)				

=== 2004 ===
2004 Andhra Pradesh Legislative Assembly election: Tadepalligudem
Party	Candidate	Votes	%	±%
INC	Kottu Satyanarayana	72,477	59.20	+14.75
TDP	Kanaka Sundara Rao Pasala	47,544	38.84	−14.90
Majority		24,933	20.36	
Turnout		122,418	73.18	+5.88
INC gain from TDP		Swing		

=== 2009 ===
2009 Andhra Pradesh Legislative Assembly election: Tadepalligudem
Party	Candidate	Votes	%	±%
PRP	Eli Venkata Madhusudhan Rao	48,747	33.95	
INC	Kottu Satyanarayana	45,727	31.84	−27.36
TDP	Mullapudi Bapiraju	41,282	28.75	−10.09
Majority		3,020	2.11	
Turnout		143,596	83.61	+10.43
PRP gain from INC		Swing		

=== 2014 ===
2014 Andhra Pradesh Legislative Assembly election: Tadepalligudem
Party	Candidate	Votes	%	±%
BJP	Pydikondala Manikyalarao	73,339	46.74	
YSRCP	Thota Poorna Gopala Satyanarayana	59,266	37.77	
Majority		14,073	8.97	
Turnout		156,918	81.29	−2.32
BJP gain from PRP		Swing		

=== 2019 ===
2019 Andhra Pradesh Legislative Assembly election: Tadepalligudem
Party	Candidate	Votes	%	±%
YSRCP	Kottu Satyanarayana	70,741	42.17	
TDP	Eli Venkata Madhusudhan Rao	54,275	32.35	
JSP	Bolisetti Srinivas	36,197	21.58	
Majority		16,466	9.82	
Turnout		167,761	80.46	−0.83
YSRCP gain from TDP		Swing		

=== 2024 ===
2024 Andhra Pradesh Legislative Assembly election: Tadepalligudem
Party	Candidate	Votes	%	±%
JSP	Bolisetti Srinivas	116,443	65.32	+43.74
YSRCP	Kottu Satyanarayana	53,951	30.37	−11.8
INC	Marneedi Sekhar	1,901	1.08	
NOTA	None Of The Above	1,534	0.86	
Majority		62,492	35.5	
Turnout		1,75,990		
JSP gain from YSRCP		Swing	+43.74	

== See also ==
- List of constituencies of Andhra Pradesh Legislative Assembly
