= Rapur =

- Town
- Location in Andhra Pradesh, India Rapur (India)
- Coordinates: 14°12′05″N 79°32′06″E
- Country: India
- State: Andhra Pradesh
- District: Nellore
- Elevation: 90 m (300 ft)

Population (2011)
  - Total: 44,424

Languages
  - Official: Telugu
- Time zone: UTC+5:30 (IST)
- PIN: 524408
- Vehicle registration: AP

Rapur is a town, municipality, railway junction and a Mandal in SPSR Nellore district in the Indian state of Andhra Pradesh. It become a municipality in 2020.

Rapur has India's longest electrified railway tunnel, 6.6 km long on line between Cheropali-Krishnapatnam port, opened by vice president M. Venkaiah Naidu on Aug 21, 2019. Rapur became a railway junction with 4 routes in 2022 after completion of Nadikudi-Srikalahastri line.

Kandaleru dam, the longest earth dam, is also in Rapur mandal. The dam is a part of Telugu Ganga project which is a key water source channel for Chennai. Fishes of all kind from this dam are being exported to Kerala and Chennai. The surroundings forest and land have rich mica resources.

== Geography ==
Rapur is located at 14.2000°N 79.5167°E. It has an average elevation of 90 meters (298 feet). Rapur comes under Nellore district and has a border with Kadapa district. Rapur town is surrounded by very big hills named veligonda which makes it a sightseeing place especially in winter and rainy seasons. Agriculture plays a vital role and rice as a major crop.

Amaravati is the state capital located 351 kilometers from Rapur. Other state's capitals which are near to Rapur are Chennai at a distance of 148.2 km, Bangalore 252.2 km, Pondicherry 253.7 km.

The surrounding nearby villages and its distance from Rapur are Pangili 3.0 km, Nellepalle 5.0 km, Yepuru 6.0 km, Thumaya 7.7 km, Gilakapadu 8.8 km, Gundavolu 8.8 km, Jorepalle 9.6 km, J.A Puram 14.5 km, Akilavalasa 11.7 km, Sanayapalem 14.6 km, Khambhalapalle 16.5 km, Gonupalli 17.0 km, M.v.puram, .

== Demographics ==
Total population of Rapur Mandal is 44,424 living in 10,367 Houses, Spread across total 58 villages and 21 panchayats . Males are 22,306 and Females are 22,118.

== Temperature ==
The maximum temperature is 36-46c during summer and the minimum temperature is 23-25c during winter. The rainfall ranges from 700 to 1000 mm through South West and North East Monsoons

== Connectivity Details ==
Rapur have an APSRTC Bus stand and depot, recently got railway station too which is near from maddelamadu center. Tirupathi Airport is the nearest one which is at a distance 73 km.

== Tourist Places ==
Kandaleru Dam at a distance of 18.7 Sivakona Waterfalls at a distance of 11.4 km Penchalakona Waterfalls at a distance of 27 km Penchalakona Temple distance of 26.7 km Sight seeing of Attractive Hills and Reserved forest Area which starts just 1.4 km away from town

== Pilgrimages ==
Rapur has surrounded by many holiest places and pilgrimages like Penchalakona, Tirumala, Sri Kalahastri. Penchalakona is very famous for Sri Lakshmi Narasimha Swami temple.

== Language ==
The languages spoken in Rapur are Telugu, Urdu, English. People live close to each other irrespective of religion, so almost everyone can understand and speak Urdu, although Telugu is official state language.

== Colleges ==
Animal Husbandry Polytechnic Rapur was established during September 2007, under the esteemed Sri Venkateswara Veterinary University at Bojjanapalle, Rapur mandal, Nellore district. This college has an administrative building, separate classrooms for first and second years, laboratory, museum, library, staff quarters, playground in addition to separate boys and girls hostel in an area of 29.56 acres. Newly constructed farms are available separately for cattle, sheep, goats and poultry for demonstration of farm activities to students. The first six batches of students were admitted at Rapur during 2007 – 2014 and the college was shifted from Rapur to a 30-acre nearby land during April, 2014.

== Administration ==
Police Station

Fire Station

Hospital

Mandal Revenue Office

APSRTC Depot

Mandal Parishat Office

Post Office

Social Welfare Office

Public Library

Urdu Library

== Education ==
GEMS English Medium High School

Good Shepherd English Medium High School

G.P Narasimham English Medium School

Simhapuri English Medium High School

Lakshmi Vidyaniketan English Medium High School

Amma Sri Karunamayi English and Telugu Medium High School

Madhava English Medium High School

Umesh Chandra Memorial School(North School)

MPPS Maddelamadugu Center, Rapur

MPPS Lakshmipuram, Rapur

MPPS Kothapeta, Rapur

MPPS Hindu, Rapur

MPPS Urdu, Rapur

SBT GOVERNMENT GIRLS HIGH SCHOOL

Chennu Ramachandra Reddy Memorial Government Boys High School

ST Government Welfare Hostel and School for Girls

C.V. Krishnaiah Government Junior College

Sri Vinayaka Junior College

Animal Husbandary Polytechnic

Government Degree College

== Politics ==
Rapur (Assembly constituency)|Rapur was an assembly constituency of the Andhra Pradesh Legislative Assembly, India until 2008. Right now after delimitation is in Venkatagiri Assembly constituency of Andhra Pradesh. 166,411 voters were registered in the Rapur constituency during the 1999 elections.

Elected Members:

- 1972 - Nuvvula Venkataratnam Naidu, Indian National Congress
- 1978 - Nuvvula Venkataratnam Naidu Indian National Congress
- 1983 - Malireddy Adinarayana Reddy, Telugu Desam Party
- 1985 - Anam Ramnarayana Reddy, Telugu Desam Party
- 1989 - Nuvvula Venkataratnam Naidu - Indian National Congress
- 1994 - Y. Sreenivasulu Reddy, Telugu Desam Party
- 1999 - Anam Ramnarayana Reddy- Indian National Congress
- 2004 - Anam Ramnarayana Reddy- Indian National Congress

In 2009 Mr.Ramakrishna.K has elected as a M.L.A for venkatagiri assembly constitution. This Assembly Constituency are Marge at Venkatagiri Assembly Constituency from 2009 in General Election

== Villages in Rapur Mandal ==
Kandaleru Dam

Tegacherla

Penubarthi

Gonupallu

Penchalakona

sydadupalli

Yepuru

masidupeta

marlapudi

vepinapi

pangili

velugonu

Momin Gunta

Siddavaram

Cherlopalli

Jorepalli

Thanamcherlla
