= Pydikondala Manikyala Rao =

Indian politician (1961–2020)

Minister of Endowments
- In office May 2014 – March 2018
- Chief Minister: N. Chandrababu Naidu
- Constituency: Tadepalligudem

Member of Andhra Pradesh Legislative Assembly
- In office May 2014 – May 2019
- Constituency: Tadepalligudem

Personal details
- Born: 1 November 1961 Andhra Pradesh, India
- Died: 1 August 2020 (aged 58) Vijayawada, India
- Party: Bharatiya Janata Party
- Cabinet: Government of Andhra Pradesh

Pydikondala Manikyala Rao (1 November 1961 – 1 August 2020) was an Indian politician. He was a Member of Legislative Assembly for Tadepalligudem and former Endowments Minister for Andhra Pradesh (from 2014 – March 2018).

== Life ==
He was a member of the Bharatiya Janata Party. Rao died on 1 August 2020, at a hospital in Vijayawada after having been taken ill with COVID-19 a week prior during the COVID-19 pandemic in India.
