= Eli Varalakshmi =

Indian politician

Eli Varalakshmi (died 15 February 2026) was an Indian politician from Andhra Pradesh. She was a former member of the Andhra Pradesh Legislative Assembly, elected from the Tadepalligudem Assembly constituency in the byelections in 1983 representing the Telugu Desam Party and in 1987, representing the Indian National Congress.

== Early life ==
Varalakshmi was from Tadepalligudem, West Godavari district, Andhra Pradesh. She married Eli Anjaneyulu, a former ZP chairman and MLA from Tadepalligudem. After the death of her husband, she entered active politics in 1983. Her son Eli Venkatamadhusudan Rao also served as an MLA of Tadepalligudem.

== Career ==
Varalakshmi first became an MLA winning the byelection to the Tadepalligudem Assembly constituency in 1983 following the death of her husband Eli Anjaneyulu. She contested on the Telugu Desam Party ticket and won the seat. Later, she shifted to the Indian National Congress but lost the 1985 Andhra Pradesh Legislative Assembly election from Tadepalligudem. She polled 25029 votes but lost to Yerra Narayanaswamy of the TDP. However, she contested again on the Congress ticket and won the byelection held in 1987 following the resignation of sitting MLA Yerra Narayanaswamy.
