= Rapur Assembly constituency =

Former constituency of the Andhra Pradesh legislative assembly, India

Coordinates: 14.20°N 79.54°E

Rapur
- Former constituency for the Andhra Pradesh Legislative Assembly

Constituency details
- Country: India
- Region: South India
- State: Andhra Pradesh
- District: Nellore
- Established: 1951
- Abolished: 2008
- Reservation: None

Rapur Assembly constituency was a constituency of the Andhra Pradesh Legislative Assembly, India until 2008.

== Overview ==
It was part of Nellore Lok Sabha constituency and had the following mandals.

1. Kaluvay
2. Manubolu
3. Podalkur
4. Rapur
5. Sydapuram

== Members of the Legislative Assembly ==
Year	Member	Political party
1952	Dandamudi Dasaratha Ramayya Naidu	Indian National Congress
1972	Nuvvula Venkataratnam Naidu	Independent politician
1978	Nuvvula Venkataratnam Naidu	Indian National Congress
1983	Malireddy Adinarayana Reddy	Telugu Desam Party
1985	Anam Ramnarayana Reddy	Telugu Desam Party
1989	Nuvvula Venkataratnam Naidu	Indian National Congress
1994	Y. Sreenivasulu Reddy	Telugu Desam Party
1999	Anam Ramnarayana Reddy	Indian National Congress
2004	Anam Ramnarayana Reddy	Indian National Congress

== Election results ==
=== 1952 ===
1952 Madras Legislative Assembly election: Rapur
Party	Candidate	Votes	%	±%
INC	D. Dasaratharamiah Naidu	10,805	27.53%	27.53%
CPI	Ganga Ramanaiah	8,368	21.32%	
Independent	Bollu Chenchu Narasimham	7,361	18.76%	
Socialist Party (India)	Malireddy Pattabhirami Reddi	4,751	12.11%	
Independent	Nunna Venkatarumiah	3,159	8.05%	
Independent	M. B. D. Krishna Prasad	2,500	6.37%	
Independent	Basirani Sundararama Naidy	1,452	3.70%	
Independent	Kollapanenl Lakshminaryanana	851	2.17%	
Margin of victory		2,437	6.21%	
Turnout		39,247	58.28%	
Registered electors		67,347		
INC win (new seat)				

=== 1994 ===
Andhra Pradesh Legislative Assembly election, 1994: Rapur
Party	Candidate	Votes	%	±%
TDP	Y. Sreenivasulu Reddy	52,180	47.18	
INC	Anam Ramnarayana Reddy	43,781	38.68	
Independent	Ravula Ankaiah Goud	12458	11.00	
BJP	Midathala Ramesh	2,509	2.22	
Majority		8,389	7.41	
Turnout		1,13,204	74.70	+0.59
TDP gain from INC		Swing		

=== 1999 ===
1999 Andhra Pradesh Legislative Assembly election: Atmakur
Party	Candidate	Votes	%	±%
INC	Anam Rama Narayana Reddy	76,907	51.92	
TDP	Y. Sreenivasulu Reddy	58,263	39.33	
PRP	Khajavali Shaik	8,772	5.92	
Majority		18,644	12.59	
Turnout		148,137	78.04	−2.86
INC gain from Independent		Swing		

=== 2004 ===
2004 Andhra Pradesh Legislative Assembly election: Atmakur
Party	Candidate	Votes	%	±%
Independent	Kommi Lakshmaiah Naidu	43,347	36.25	
BJP	Bollineni Krishnaiah	38,950	32.58	
INC	Bommireddy Sundararami Reddy	32,686	27.34	
Majority		4,397	3.67	
Turnout		119,562	80.90	+10.29
Independent gain from INC		Swing		

== See also ==
- List of constituencies of Andhra Pradesh Vidhan Sabha
