= Tadepalligudem Municipality =

Local self government in Andhra Pradesh, India

Tadepalligudem City Municipality
- Formation: 1958
- Merger of: Municipality
- Type: Governmental organization
- Legal status: Local government
- Headquarters: Tadepalligudem
- Location: Tadepalligudem, West Godavari district, Andhra Pradesh, India
- Official language: Telugu
- Chairman: Vacant
- Municipal Commissioner: Dr. A Samuel
- Main organ: Committee

Tadepalligudem Municipality is the local self government in Tadepalligudem City of the Indian state of Andhra Pradesh. It is classified as a Selection Grade Municipality.

== Administration ==
Tadepalligudem municipality was formed in the year 1958. The municipality is spread over an area of 20.71 km^{2} (8.00 sq mi) and has 35 election wards. each represented by a ward member and the wards committee is headed by a chairperson. The present municipal commissioner of the city is Dr.A. Samuel.

== Awards and achievements ==
The city is one among the 31 cities in the state to be a part of water supply and sewerage services mission known as Atal Mission for Rejuvenation and Urban Transformation (AMRUT). In 2015, as per the Swachh Bharat Abhiyan of the Ministry of Urban Development, Tadepalligudem Municipality was ranked 352nd in the country.

== See also ==
- List of municipalities in Andhra Pradesh
