= Tadepalligudem =

- City
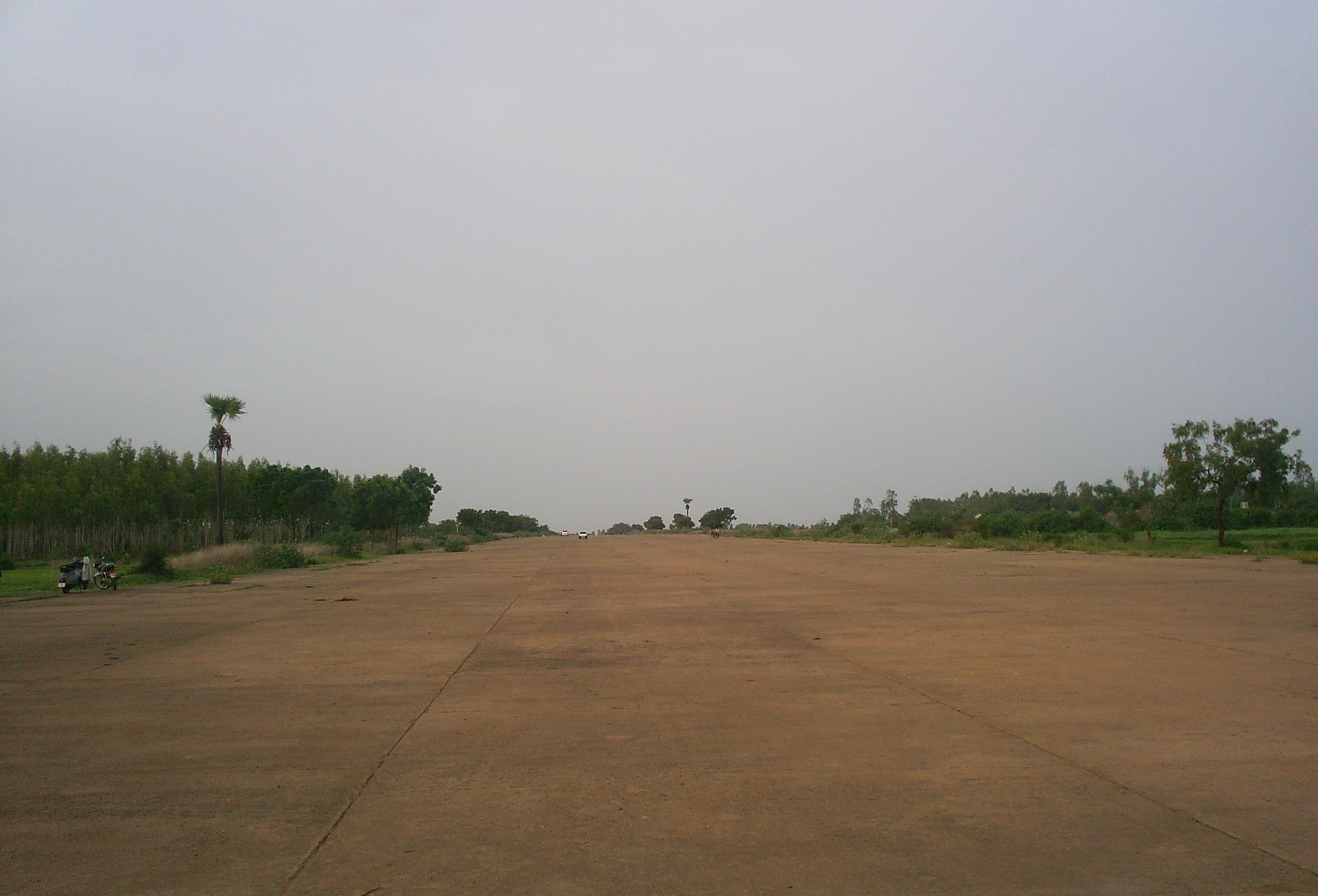
- Tadepalligudem Airstrip

- Location in Andhra Pradesh, India
- Coordinates: 16.815°N 81.526°E
- Country: India
- State: Andhra Pradesh
- District: West Godavari

Government
  - Type: Municipality
  - Body: Tadepalligudem Selection Grade Municipality
  - MLA: Bolisetti Srinivas

Area
  - City: 50.57 km^{2} (19.53 sq mi)

Population (2011)
  - City: 130,348
  - Rank: 26
  - Density: 2,578/km^{2} (6,676/sq mi)
  - Metro: 135,032

Languages
  - Official: Telugu
- Time zone: UTC+5:30 (IST)
- PIN: 534101, 534102,534146
- Telephone code: +91–08818
- Vehicle registration: AP 37

Tadepalligudem is a town in West Godavari district of the Indian state of Andhra Pradesh. Tadepalligudem is the judicial headquarter of West Godavari. It is a Selection Grade municipality and the mandal headquarters of Tadepalligudem mandal and Tadepalligudem Revenue Division. It is one of the largest cities in West Godavari district

== Geography ==
Tadepalligudem is located at 16.8333°N 81.5000°E. It has an average elevation of 34 metres (114 feet).

== Demographics ==
As of 2011 Census of India, the mandal had a population of 2,32,346. The total population constitute, 65,045 males and 113457 females — a sex ratio of 1,022 females per 1,000 males - higher than the national average of 940 per 1000. 9,048 children are in the age group of 0–6 years, of which 4,662 are boys and 4,386 are girls—a ratio of 941 per 1000. The average literacy rate stands at 83.10% (male 86.60%; female 79.71%) with 78,557 literates, significantly higher than the national average of 73.00%.

The urban agglomeration had a population of 1,35,032 of which males constitute 67,028 and females constitute 1,18,432 — a sex ratio of 1,024 females per 1,000 males - and 9,061 children are in the age group of 0–6 years. There are a total of 78,656 literates with an average literacy rate of 83.11%.

== Municipality ==
Tadepalligudem Municipality was formed in the year 1958. It is a Selection–Grade Municipality, which is spread over an area of 50.57 km^{2} (19.53 mi^{2}) and has 48 election wards.

== Education ==
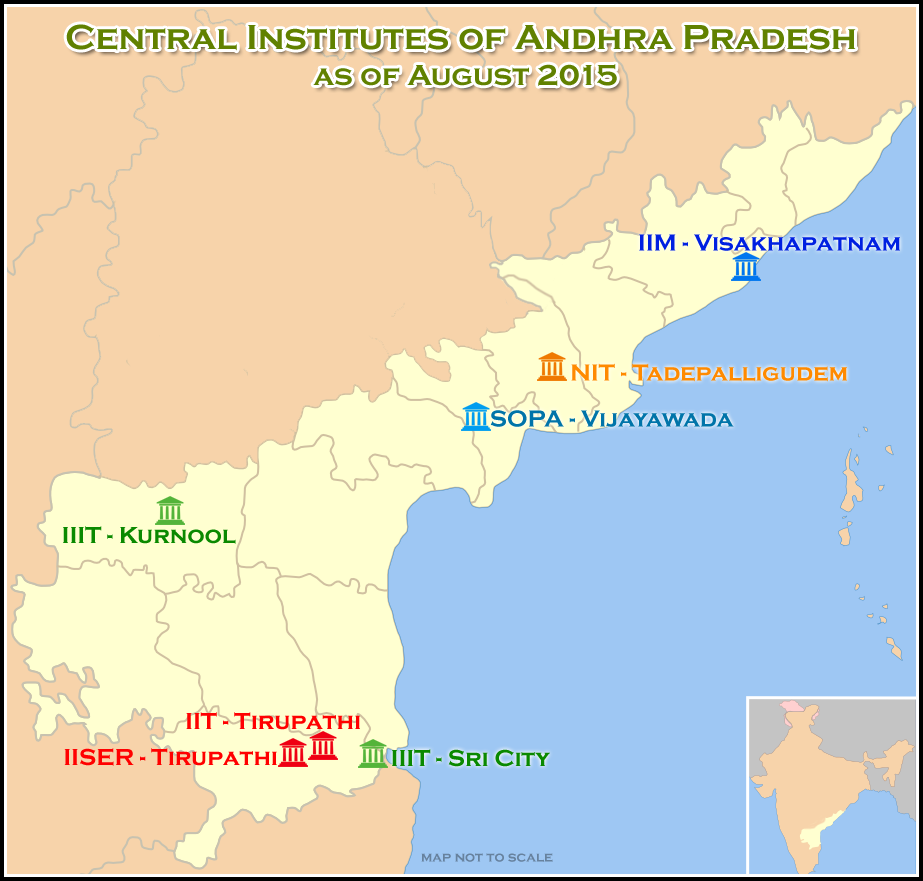
Central Institutes Map of Andhra Pradesh (click on the map to enlarge)

The primary and secondary school education is imparted by government, aided and private schools of the School Education Department of the state. National Institute of Technology, Tadepalligudem is the 31st NIT in the country, for which the foundation stone was laid in the town on 20 August 2015. The Horticulture university of Andhrapradesh is also situated in Tadepalligudem.

== Transport ==
The town has a total road length of 207.30 km (128.81 mi). Asian Highway 45 passes through the town, which is a part of the Golden Quadrilateral project. The Andhra Pradesh State Road Transport Corporation operates bus services from Tadepalligudem bus station. Tadepalligudem railway station is located on Visakhapatnam–Vijayawada section of Howrah-Chennai main line. It is one of the thirteen A – category stations located in Vijayawada railway division of South Central Railway zone. Almost all the trains passing through Tadepalligudem have stoppages here. Tadepalligudem has an airport which is currently not in use, built by the British to accommodate military aircraft during World War II. In 1942. The Government of Andhra Pradesh proposed an airport in Tadepalligudem along with five other cities. Rajahmundry Airport is the nearest airport. Tadepalligudem railway station was selected for redevelopment under the Amrit Bharat Station Scheme in the 2023-24 Railway budget and allocated ₹27 crores.

== Climate ==
Tadepalligudem experiences hot and humid climate due to its proximity to the shore of Bay of Bengal. It has an average annual temperature of 28.2 °C (82.8 °F). May is the hottest and December is the coolest month of the year. Temperature crosses 40 °C (104 °F) in summer. July receives most precipitation and annually the city receives an average rainfall of 992 mm (39.1 in).

Climate data for Tadepalligudem, Andhra Pradesh
Month	Jan	Feb	Mar	Apr	May	Jun	Jul	Aug	Sep	Oct	Nov	Dec	Year
Mean daily maximum °C (°F)	29.1 (84.4)	31.7 (89.1)	34.5 (94.1)	36.7 (98.1)	38.6 (101.5)	36.9 (98.4)	32.4 (90.3)	32.0 (89.6)	32.2 (90.0)	31.4 (88.5)	29.8 (85.6)	28.8 (83.8)	32.8 (91.1)
Mean daily minimum °C (°F)	18.9 (66.0)	20.3 (68.5)	22.6 (72.7)	25.8 (78.4)	27.9 (82.2)	27.2 (81.0)	25.4 (77.7)	25.3 (77.5)	25.3 (77.5)	24.3 (75.7)	21.3 (70.3)	18.8 (65.8)	23.6 (74.4)
Average rainfall mm (inches)	3 (0.1)	6 (0.2)	6 (0.2)	14 (0.6)	40 (1.6)	123 (4.8)	229 (9.0)	186 (7.3)	170 (6.7)	166 (6.5)	40 (1.6)	9 (0.4)	992 (39)
Source: en.climate-data.org

== See also ==
- List of cities in Andhra Pradesh by population
- List of municipalities in Andhra Pradesh
