= Dharmana Prasada Rao =

Indian politician

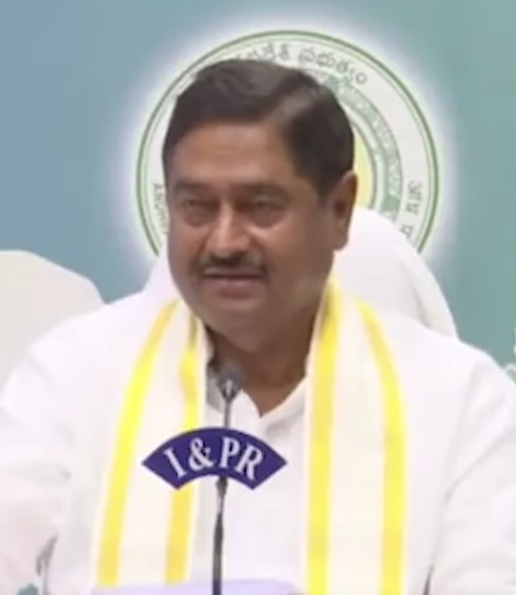

Minister for Revenue, Stamps and Registration Government of Andhra Pradesh
- In office 11 April 2022 – 12 June 2024
- Governor: S. Abdul Nazeer; Biswabhusan Harichandan
- Chief Minister: Y. S. Jagan Mohan Reddy
- Preceded by: Dharmana Krishna Das
- Succeeded by: Anagani Satya Prasad

Minister of Roads & Buildings Government of Andhra Pradesh
- In office 25 May 2009 – 8 August 2013
- Governor: E. S. L. Narasimhan; N. D. Tiwari
- Chief Minister: Kiran Kumar Reddy; Konijeti Rosaiah; Y. S. Rajasekhara Reddy
- Preceded by: Galla Aruna Kumari
- Succeeded by: Chief Minister of Andhra Pradesh

Revenue, Relief and Rehabilitation & Urban Land Ceiling Government of Andhra Pradesh
- In office 14 May 2004 – 20 May 2009
- Governor: N. D. Tiwari; Rameshwar Thakur; Sushilkumar Shinde; Surjit Singh Barnala
- Chief Minister: Y. S. Rajasekhara Reddy
- Preceded by: Tammineni Sitaram
- Succeeded by: Pithani Satyanarayana

Member of Legislative Assembly Andhra Pradesh
- In office 2019–2024
- Preceded by: Gunda Lakshmi Devi
- Succeeded by: Gondu Shankar
- Constituency: Srikakulam
- In office 2004–2014
- Preceded by: Appala Suryanarayana Gunda
- Succeeded by: Gunda Lakshmi Devi
- Constituency: Srikakulam
- In office 1999–2004
- Preceded by: Boggu Lakshman Rao
- Succeeded by: Dharmana Krishna Das
- Constituency: Narasannapeta
- In office 1989–1994
- Preceded by: Simma Prabhakar Rao
- Succeeded by: Boggu Lakshman Rao
- Constituency: Narasannapeta

Personal details
- Party: YSR Congress Party (2014–present)
- Other political affiliations: Indian National Congress (until 2014)

== Personal life ==
Prasad Rao Born in Mabagaam Village in Polaki Mandal Srikakulam district He is Belongs to Velama Community(caste) His four father's are 900 Acres Land Lords His Elder Brother Dharmana Krishna Das also serviced as ex R&B minister Dharmana Prasada Rao is an Indian politician from the state of Andhra Pradesh. He was a Member of the Legislative Assembly (MLA) from Srikakulam. He was former Minister of Roads and Buildings (R&B) and a former Revenue minister of Andhra Pradesh.

== Political career ==
Dharmana Prasada Rao is a politician and state leader of the YSR Congress Party (YSRCP) from Srikakulam district. Dharmana Prasada Rao won 5 terms as an MLA from Srikakulam Assembly Constituency, including the 2019 election.

He has served as Textiles, Sports, and Water Resource Minister in the cabinet of Nedurumalli Janardhana Reddy and Kotla Vijaya Bhaskara Reddy. He served as revenue, minister in the cabinet of Y.S. Rajasekhar Reddy. He also served as Roads and Buildings Minister in the cabinet of N Kiran Kumar Reddy. He reached his current position from the position of Village councilor (Sarpanch).

In August 2012, he resigned from the cabinet ministry following a chargesheet by the Central Bureau of Investigation on him alleging corruption in VANPIC project.

He left Congress and joined YSRCP on 9 Feb 2014. He won the 2019 assembly elections to Gunda Lakshmi Devi of Telugu Desam Party.

== VANPIC case ==
In April 2012, the Central Bureau of Investigation (CBI) questioned Dharmana in relation to the disproportionate assets case, that it was investigating against Y. S. Jagan Mohan Reddy. CBI questioned the motives behind passing GOs, when he was the revenue minister, allocating land to several projects including VANPIC.

In August 2012, CBI filed a chargesheet naming Dharmana as accused number 5, along with Jagan Mohan Reddy, Nimmagadda Prasad, Mopidevi Venkataramana and others. In the chargesheet it alleged quid pro quo among the accused. Following the chargesheet, Dharmana has resigned from cabinet ministry. But the then Chief Minister Nallari Kiran Kumar Reddy has not accepted the resignation. However, Dharmana has since stayed away from the cabinet meetings.

In January 2013, a CBI court has permitted the prosecution of the case.
