= Gunda Appala Suryanarayana =

Indian politician

Gunda Appala Suryanarayana (16 January 1948 – 12 January 2026) was an Indian politician from Andhra Pradesh. He was a former four time member of the Andhra Pradesh Legislative Assembly from Srikakulam Assembly constituency in Srikakulam district representing the Telugu Desam Party. He won as an MLA in 1985, 1989, 1994 and 1999 and served as a minister twice in 1987 and 1989.

== Early life ==
Suryanarayana is from Srikakulam, Andhra Pradesh. His wife Gunda Lakshmi Devi was elected as an MLA from the Srikakulam seat after her.

== Career ==
Suryanarayana started his political career as a municipal chairman in 1981. He first became and MLA winning the Srikakulam Assembly constituency in the 1985 Andhra Pradesh Legislative Assembly election representing the Telugu Desam Party. He polled 51,925 votes and defeated his nearest rival, Mylapilli Narsayya of the Indian National Congress, by 38,957 votes. He retained the Srikakulam seat for the Telugu Desam in the 1989 election where he polled 52,766 votes and beat his closest opponent, Vandana Seshagiri Rao of the Indian National Congress (Indira), by 5,711 votes. He won for the third straight time in the 1994 Andhra Pradesh Legislative Assembly election polling 70,441 votes and defeated Andhavarapu Varaha Narasimham of the Congress party by 31,573 votes. In 1999, he became a four time MLA winning the 1999 Andhra Pradesh Legislative Assembly election defeating Challa Ravikumar of the Congress by 11,163 votes. Later, he lost both the 2004 and 2009 elections.

=== Death ===
Suryanarayana died at a private hospital in Srikakulam on 12 January 2026. He was admitted following a fall at home with a head injury.
