= Baggu Ramanamurthy =

Indian politician

Member of Legislative Assembly, Andhra Pradesh
- Incumbent
- Assumed office 2024
- Preceded by: Dharmana Krishna Das
- Constituency: Narasannapeta
- In office 2014–2019
- Preceded by: Dharmana Krishna Das
- Succeeded by: Dharmana Krishna Das
- Constituency: Narasannapeta

Personal details
- Party: Telugu Desam Party

Baggu Ramanamurthy is an Indian politician from Andhra Pradesh. He is a member of Telugu Desam Party. He has been elected as the Member of the Legislative Assembly representing the Narasannapeta Assembly constituency in 2024 Andhra Pradesh Legislative Assembly elections.
