= Nimmagadda Foundation =

Philanthropic initiative of Nimmagadda Prasad

- Founded: 2006
- Founder: Nimmagadda Prasad
- Purpose: Advance Human Welfare
- Location: Hyderabad, Telangana, India
- Method: Donations, Private and Corporate Funding, Mentoring
- Website: nimmagaddafoundation.org

Nimmagadda Foundation is a philanthropic initiative of Nimmagadda Prasad, the chairman of VANPIC Group. With major contributions by Prasad, in his personal capacity, Nimmagadda Foundation was set up to work in areas like healthcare, education, life skills improvement and community development. The foundation seeks to work in collaboration with non-profit organizations and other like-minded NGOs.

The foundation firmly believes that the society would flourish only when the benefits of economic growth percolate down the line to the less privileged segments of the society. It is not about giving charity but about building sustainable communities that are enabled and empowered in the long run. Drishti (Vision), Hrudaya (Heart), Arogya (Health), Vidya (Education), Nypunya (Skillset) and Parirakshna (Restoring) are the core areas that the foundation is working in. The Asian Institute of Gastroenterology, CARE Hospitals and LV Prasad Eye Institute are key partners in the initiative.

In 2010, Nimmagadda Foundation donated to TeachAids to fund the creation of new state-of-the-art HIV/AIDS education for India.

== Notes ==
- Nimmagadda Foundation Website
