= Gondu Shankar =

Indian politician

Member of the Andhra Pradesh Legislative Assembly
- Incumbent
- Assumed office 2024
- Preceded by: Dharmana Prasada Rao
- Constituency: Srikakulam

Personal details
- Born: 18 June 1976 (age 50) singupuram, Andhra Pradesh, India
- Party: Telugu Desam Party
- Spouse: Gondu swathi (m. 2004)
- Children: 2
- Education: Bangalore University (Civil engineering)

Gondu Shankar is an Indian politician from Andhra Pradesh. He is a member of the Andhra Pradesh Legislative Assembly winning the 2024 Andhra Pradesh Legislative Assembly elections representing the Telugu Desam Party from the Srikakulam Assembly constituency.

== Career ==
He served as sarpanch of Krishnappapeta in Srikakulam mandal. He was also the president of Srikakulam Sarpanches Association. In 2024, he won the 2024 Andhra Pradesh Legislative Assembly election from Srikakulam constituency with 60.90% votes as a Telugu Desam Party candidate.
