= Tangi Satyanarayana =

Indian politician

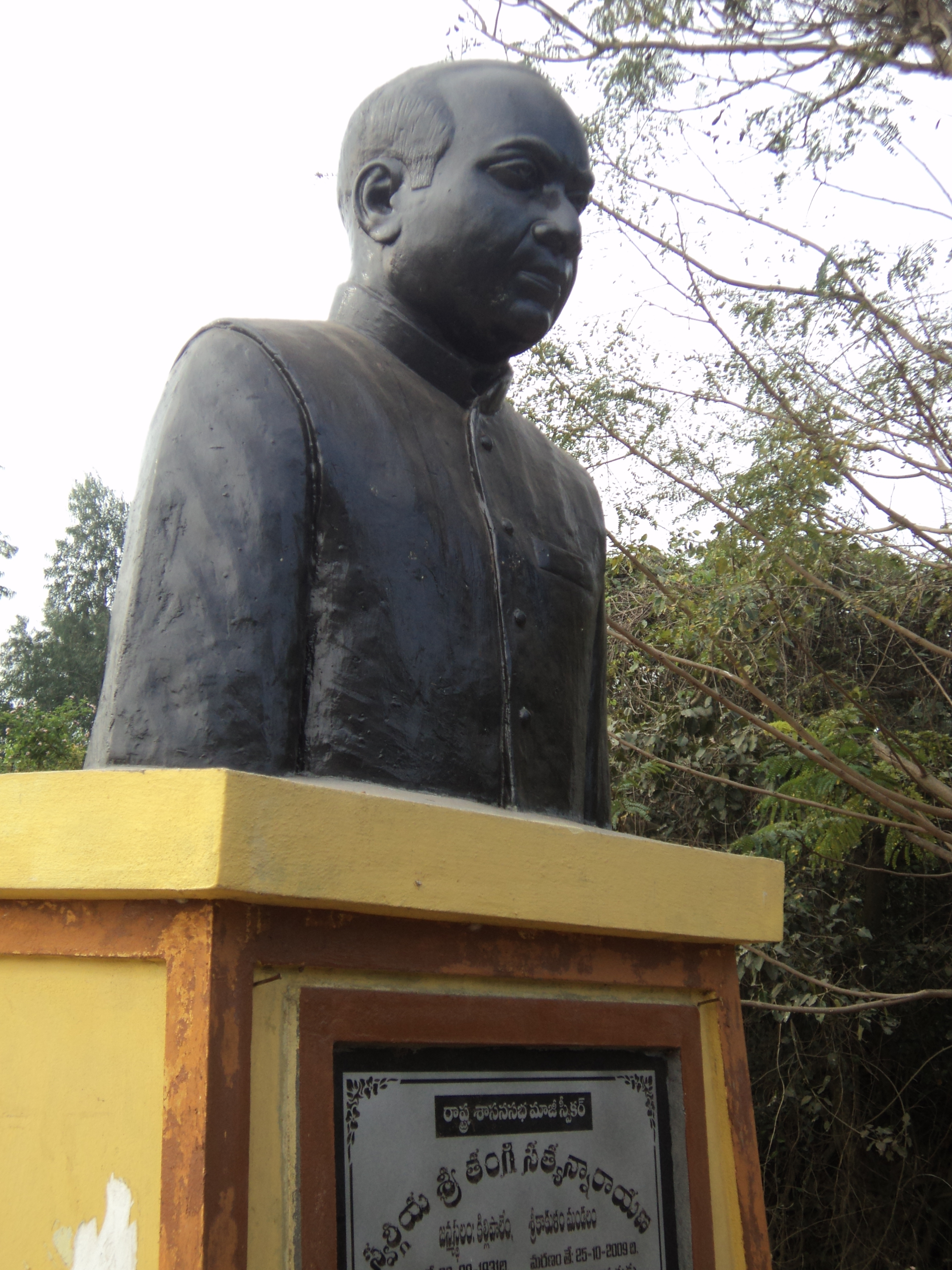
- Statue of Tangi Satyanarayana in Srikakulam.

Speaker of Andhra Pradesh Legislative Assembly
- In office 1983 - 1984
- Preceded by: Kona Prabhakara Rao
- Succeeded by: D. Sripada Rao
- Constituency: Srikakulam

Personal details
- Born: 1931 Srikakulam district
- Died: 2009 (aged 77–78) Killipalem, Srikakulam district
- Party: Telugu Desam Party

Tangi Satyanarayana (1931 – 25 October 2009) was an Indian politician.

He was elected as an Independent candidate from Srikakulam in 1967. Later he joined the Telugu Desam Party and was reelected in 1983 under the leadership of N. T. Rama Rao.

He served as the Speaker of the Vidhan Sabha, the Andhra Pradesh Legislative Assembly from 18 January 1983 to 28 August 1984 during the Telugu Desam Party (TDP) government. After the fall of N. T. Rama Rao's government, he joined with Nadendla Bhaskara Rao and subsequently, was made revenue minister for a brief period.

Satyanarayana died on 25 October 2009, in his native village of Killipalem in Srikakulam district following a long illness at the age of 84.
