= Srikakulam Assembly constituency =

Constituency of the Andhra Pradesh Legislative Assembly, India

Coordinates: 18°18′11.62″N 83°50′57.43″E

Srikakulam
- Constituency No. 5 for the Andhra Pradesh Legislative Assembly
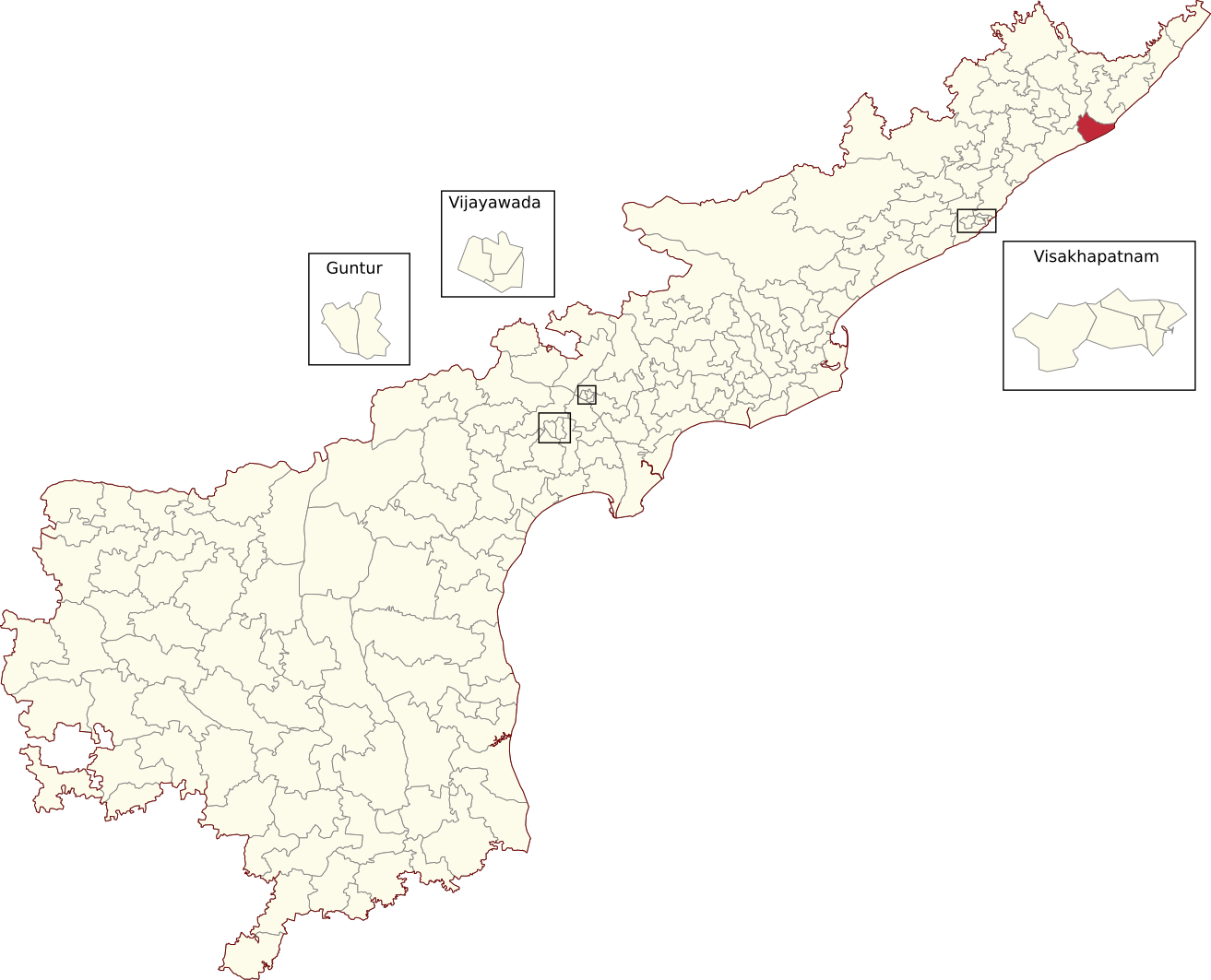
- Location of Srikakulam Assembly constituency within Andhra Pradesh

Constituency details
- Country: India
- Region: South India
- State: Andhra Pradesh
- District: Srikakulam
- Lok Sabha constituency: Srikakulam
- Established: 1951
- Total electors: 255,177
- Reservation: None

Member of Legislative Assembly
- 16th Andhra Pradesh Legislative Assembly
- Incumbent Gondu Shankar Rao
- Party: TDP
- Alliance: NDA
- Elected year: 2024

Srikakulam Assembly constituency is a constituency in Srikakulam district of Andhra Pradesh, that elects representatives to the Andhra Pradesh Legislative Assembly, in India. It is one of the seven assembly segments of Srikakulam Lok Sabha constituency.

Gondu Shankar Rao is the current MLA of the constituency, having won the 2024 Andhra Pradesh Legislative Assembly election from Telugu Desam Party. As of 2019, there are a total of 255,177 electors in the constituency. The constituency was established in 1951, as per the Delimitation Orders (1951).

== Mandals ==
The two mandals that form the assembly constituency are:

Mandals
Srikakulam
Gara

Mandals in Srikakulam Assembly constituency

== Members of the Legislative Assembly ==
Year	Member	Political party
1952	Killi Appala Naidu	Krishikar Lok Party
1955	Pasagada Suryanarayana	Independent politician
1962	Andhavarapu Thavitiah	Indian National Congress
1967	Tangi Satyanarayana	Swatantra Party
1972	Challa Lakshminarayana	Independent
1978	Challa Lakshminarayana	Janata Party
1983	Challa Lakshminarayana	Telugu Desam Party
1985	Gunda Appala Suryanarayana	Telugu Desam Party
1989	Gunda Appala Suryanarayana	Telugu Desam Party
1994	Gunda Appala Suryanarayana	Telugu Desam Party
1999	Gunda Appala Suryanarayana	Telugu Desam Party
2004	Dharmana Prasada Rao	Indian National Congress
2009	Dharmana Prasada Rao	Indian National Congress
2014	Gunda Lakshmi Devi	Telugu Desam Party
2019	Dharmana Prasada Rao	YSR Congress Party
2024	Gondu Shankar	Telugu Desam Party

== Election results ==
=== 2024 ===
2024 Andhra Pradesh Legislative Assembly election: Srikakulam
Party	Candidate	Votes	%	±%
TDP	Gondu Shankar	117,091	60.93	
YSRCP	Dharmana Prasada Rao	64,570	33.60	
INC	Ambati Krishna Rao	4,353	1.59	
NOTA	None Of The Above	3,373	1.23	
Turnout		1,92,168	70.00	
Registered electors		2,74,523		
Majority		52,521	19.13	
TDP gain from YSRCP		Swing		

=== 2019 ===
2019 Andhra Pradesh Legislative Assembly election: Srikakulam
Party	Candidate	Votes	%	±%
YSRCP	Dharmana Prasada Rao	84,084	32.81	
TDP	Gunda Lakshmi Devi	78,307	30.56	
JSP	Korada Sarveswara Rao	7,557	2.95	New
	Remaining	4,267	1.66	
NOTA	None Of The Above	3,082	1.2	
Turnout		1,77,297	69.19	
Registered electors		2,56,243		
Majority		5,777	2.25	
YSRCP gain from TDP		Swing		

=== 2014 ===
2014 Andhra Pradesh Legislative Assembly election: Srikakulam
Party	Candidate	Votes	%	±%
TDP	Gunda Lakshmi Devi	88,814	38.93	
YSRCP	Dharmana Prasada Rao	64,683	28.35	New
INC	Chowdari Satish	3,683	1.61	
	Remaining	6,468	2.83	
NOTA	None Of The Above	875	0.4	
Turnout		1,64,523	72.12	
Registered electors		2,28,112		
Majority		24,131	10.58	
TDP gain from INC		Swing		

=== 1952 ===
1952 Madras Legislative Assembly election: Srikakulam
Party	Candidate	Votes	%	±%
KLP	Killi Appala Naidu	17,668	15.55	
KLP	Kavali Narayana	16,244	14.30	
INC	Kottapalli Narasayya	16,222	14.28	14.28
INC	Thammineni Paparao	15,028	13.23	13.23
Independent	Gundu Surya Naidu	12,210	10.75	
Independent	Nadimpalli Lingaraju	10,960	9.65	
Socialist	Lolugu Sreeramulu Naiudu	9,453	8.32	
Independent	Muddada Gurayya	6,524	5.74	
Independent	S. P. S. Appalacharyulu	4,781	4.21	
Independent	Ruppa Appalaswamy	4,542	4.00	
Margin of victory		1,424	1.25	
Turnout		1,13,632	80.72	
Registered electors		1,40,781		
win (new seat)				

=== 1955 ===
1955 Andhra State Legislative Assembly election: Srikakulam
Party	Candidate	Votes	%	±%
Independent	Pasagada Suryanarayana	11,874	36.67	New
Independent	Surayya Gondu	9,475	29.26	▲18.51
INC	Pullela Seetharamayya	9,327	28.20	▲1.29
Independent	Gunda Simmanna	1,204	3.72	New
Independent	Bontha Viswanatham	501	1.55	New
Majority		2,399	7.41	▲6.16
Turnout		32,381	59.00	▼21.72
Independent gain from KLP		Swing		

=== 1962 ===
1962 Andhra Pradesh Legislative Assembly election: Srikakulam
Party	Candidate	Votes	%	±%
INC	Andhavarapu Thavitiah	16,231	52.67	▲23.87
Independent	Pasagada Suryanarayana	14,583	47.32	▲10.65
Majority		1,648	5.35	▼2.06
Turnout		30,814		
INC gain from Independent		Swing		

=== 1967 ===
1967 Andhra Pradesh Legislative Assembly election: Srikakulam
Party	Candidate	Votes	%	±%
SWA	Tangi Satyanarayana	27,764	55.85	
INC	Andhavarapu Thavitiah	18,276	36.76	▼15.91
Independent	D. Murty	2,412	4.85	
ABJS	L. Rao	1,261	2.54	
Majority		9,488	19.09	▲13.74
Turnout		49,713	74.02	▼6.5
SWA gain from INC		Swing		

=== 1972 ===
1972 Andhra Pradesh Legislative Assembly election: Srikakulam
Party	Candidate	Votes	%	±%
Independent	Challa Lakshminarayana	27,627	52.55	▼21.8
INC	Thangi Satyanarayana	24,944	47.45	▲42.6
Majority		2,683	5.1	▼13.99
Turnout		52,271	62.68	▼11.34
Independent gain from SWA		Swing		

=== 1978 ===
1978 Andhra Pradesh Legislative Assembly election: Srikakulam
Party	Candidate	Votes	%	±%
JP	Challa Lakshminarayana	23,643	33.3	
INC	Raghavadas Tripurna	16,556	23.3	New
INC	Tangi Satyanarayana	14,766	20.8	▼26.65
Independent	Mylapilli Satyarajula	7,509	10.6	
Independent	Ippilli Venkatrao	5,270	7.4	New
Independent	Niddapu Sannibabu	2,286	3.2	New
Independent	Gerimella Ramakrishna	928	1.3	New
Majority		7,087	9.7	▲4.6
Turnout		73,224	75.7	▲13.02
JP hold		Swing		

=== 1983 ===
1983 Andhra Pradesh Legislative Assembly election: Srikakulam
Party	Candidate	Votes	%	±%
TDP	Challa Lakshmi Narayana	49,100	67.7	
INC	Chigilipalli Rao	11,821	16.3	▼7
Independent	Suryanarayana Gunda	10,114	14.0	New
Independent	Reddy Parapati	652	0.9	New
Independent	Mylapalli Suryanarayana	451	0.6	New
IC(S)	Rayana Rao	363	0.5	New
Majority		37,279	50.4	▲40.7
Turnout		73,943	69.0	▼6.7
TDP gain from JP		Swing		

=== 1985 ===
1985 Andhra Pradesh Legislative Assembly election: Srikakulam
Party	Candidate	Votes	%	±%
TDP	Gunda Appala Suryanarayana	51,925	74.7	▲7.00
INC	Mylapilli Narsayya	12,968	18.7	▲2.4
LKD	Gouthu Latchanna	4,187	6.0	
Independent	N. V. Subbarao	420	0.6	
Majority		38,957	55.2	▲4.8
Turnout		70,637	62.5	▼6.5
TDP hold		Swing		

=== 1989 ===
1989 Andhra Pradesh Legislative Assembly election: Srikakulam
Party	Candidate	Votes	%	±%
TDP	Gunda Appala Suryanarayana	52,766	52.9	▼21.8
INC	Vandana Rao	47,055	47.1	▲28.4
Majority		5,711	5.5	▼49.7
Turnout		103,600	73.7	▲11.2
TDP hold		Swing		

=== 1994 ===
1994 Andhra Pradesh Legislative Assembly election: Srikakulam
Party	Candidate	Votes	%	±%
TDP	Gunda Appala Suryanarayana	70,441	62.7	▲9.8
INC	Andhavarapu Narasimham	38,868	34.6	▼12.5
BJP	Appannachetti Vaddi	1,434	1.3	New
BSP	Kuncham Kanakarao	783	0.7	New
Independent	Tammineni Jaganmohanrao	538	0.5	New
Independent	G.V. Madhukrishna	325	0.3	New
Majority		31,573	27.6	▲22.1
Turnout		114,297	73.8	▲0.1
TDP hold		Swing		

=== 1999 ===
1999 Andhra Pradesh Legislative Assembly election: Srikakulam
Party	Candidate	Votes	%	±%
TDP	Gunda Appala Suryanarayana	58,848	53.6	▼9.1
INC	Challa Ravikumar	47,685	43.5	▲8.9
Anna Telugu Desam Party	Tammineini Rao	1,725	1.6	New
Independent	Kuncham Rao	627	0.6	▼0.1
Pyramid Party Of India	Prasada Nanda	662	0.6	New
Independent	Challa Venkatesh	164	0.2	New
Majority		11,163	9.9	▼17.7
Turnout		113,153	66.6	▼7.2
TDP hold		Swing		

=== 2004 ===
2004 Andhra Pradesh Legislative Assembly election: Srikakulam
Party	Candidate	Votes	%	±%
INC	Dharmana Prasada Rao	69,168	52.8	▲9.3
TDP	Gunda Appala Suryanarayana	61,941	47.2	▼6.4
Majority		7,227	5.5	▼4.4
Turnout		1,30,763	71.1	▲4.5
INC gain from TDP		Swing	▲7.84	

=== 2009 ===
2009 Andhra Pradesh Legislative Assembly election: Srikakulam
Party	Candidate	Votes	%	±%
INC	Dharmana Prasada Rao	56,457	38.8	▼14.0
TDP	Gunda Appala Suryanarayana	51,987	35.8	▼11.4
PRP	Kornu Nagarjun	28,553	19.6	New
Majority		4,470	3.1	▼2.4
Turnout		1,45,380	74.4	▲3.3
INC hold		Swing	▼1.3	

== See also ==
- List of constituencies of the Andhra Pradesh Legislative Assembly
