= Narasannapeta Assembly constituency =

Constituency of the Andhra Pradesh Legislative Assembly, India

Coordinates: 18.42°N 84.05°E

Narasannapeta
- Constituency No. 8 for the Andhra Pradesh Legislative Assembly
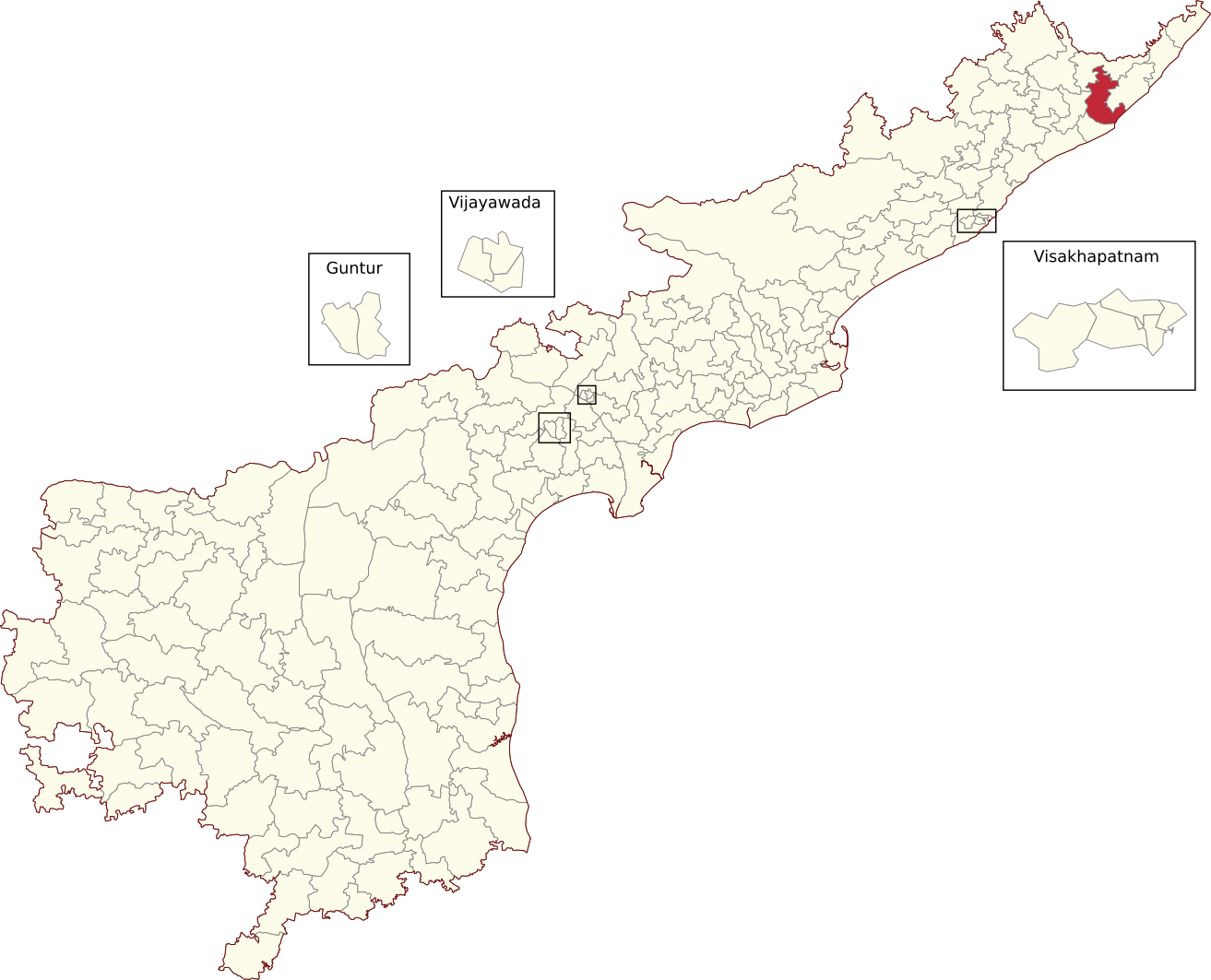
- Location of Narasannapeta Assembly constituency within Andhra Pradesh

Constituency details
- Country: India
- Region: South India
- State: Andhra Pradesh
- District: Srikakulam
- Lok Sabha constituency: Srikakulam
- Established: 1951
- Total electors: 208,469
- Reservation: None

Member of Legislative Assembly
- 16th Andhra Pradesh Legislative Assembly
- Incumbent Baggu Ramanamurthy
- Party: TDP
- Alliance: NDA
- Elected year: 2024

Narasannapeta Assembly constituency is a constituency in Srikakulam district of Andhra Pradesh that elects representatives to the Andhra Pradesh Legislative Assembly in India. It is one of the seven assembly segments of Srikakulam Lok Sabha constituency.

Baggu Ramanamurthy is the current MLA of the constituency, having won the 2024 Andhra Pradesh Legislative Assembly election from Telugu Desam Party. As of 2019, there are a total of 208,469 electors in the constituency. The constituency was established in 1951, as per the Delimitation Orders (1951).

== Mandals ==
The four mandals that form the assembly constituency are:

Mandal
Narasannapeta
Jalumuru
Saravakota
Polaki

Mandals in Narasannapeta Assembly Constituency

== Members of the Legislative Assembly ==
Year	Member	Political party
1952	H. Satyanarayana Dora	Indian National Congress
1955	Simma Jagannadham	Krishikar Lok Party
1962	Simma Jagannadham	Swatantra Party
1967	Simma Jagannadham	Swatantra Party
1972	Baggu Sarojanamma	Indian National Congress
1978	Dola Seetaramulu	Indian National Congress (I)
1983	Simma Prabhakara Rao	Telugu Desam Party
1985	Simma Prabhakara Rao	Telugu Desam Party
1989	Dharmana Prasada Rao	Indian National Congress
1994	Lakshmanarao Baggu	Telugu Desam Party
1999	Dharmana Prasada Rao	Indian National Congress
2004	Dharmana Krishna Das	Indian National Congress
2009	Dharmana Krishna Das	Indian National Congress
2012	Dharmana Krishna Das	YSR Congress Party
2014	Baggu Ramanamurthy	Telugu Desam Party
2019	Dharmana Krishna Das	YSR Congress Party
2024	Baggu Ramanamurthy	Telugu Desam Party

== Election results ==
=== 2024 ===
2024 Andhra Pradesh Legislative Assembly election: Narasannapeta
Party	Candidate	Votes	%	±%
TDP	Baggu Ramana Murthy	99,951	46.04	▲
YSRCP	Dharmana Krishna Das	70,580	32.51	▼
INC	Narasimhamurthy Mantri	2,225	1.02	−−
	Remaining	1,320	0.61	▼
NOTA	None of the above	3,300	1.52	▼
Turnout		1,77,376	81.7	▲
Registered electors		2,17,094		▲
Majority		29,371	13.53	
TDP gain from YSRCP		Swing		

=== 2019 ===
2019 Andhra Pradesh Legislative Assembly election: Narasannapeta
Party	Candidate	Votes	%	±%
YSRCP	Dharmana Krishna Das	86,797	41.24	▲
TDP	Baggu Ramana Murthy	67,242	31.95	▼
INC	Dola Udayabhaskara Rao	5,266	2.50	
	Remaining	4,733	2.25	▼
NOTA	None of the above	3,491	1.66	▲
Turnout		1,67,529	79.6	▲
Registered electors		2,10,451		▲
Majority		19,555	9.29	
YSRCP gain from TDP		Swing		

=== 2014 ===
2014 Andhra Pradesh Legislative Assembly election: Narasannapeta
Party	Candidate	Votes	%	±%
TDP	Ramanamurty Baggu	76,559	38.98	
YSRCP	Dharmana Krishna Das	71,759	36.54	New
INC	Jagan Mohana Rao Dola	2,156	1.1	
	Remaining	3,863	1.97	
NOTA	None of the above	819	0.42	
Turnout		1,55,156	79.01	
Registered electors		1,96,379		
Majority		4,800	2.44	
TDP gain from YSRCP		Swing		

=== 1952 ===
1952 Madras State Legislative Assembly election: Narasannapeta
Party	Candidate	Votes	%	±%
INC	H. Satyanarayana Dora	9,650	26.60%	26.60%
KMPP	Kasira Basava Raju	7,498	20.67%	
Independent	Muddada Latchunaiudu	6,569	18.11%	
KLP	Karimi Lakshmi Narayana Naiudu	5,958	16.42%	
Socialist Party (India)	Sinna Jagannathan	5,196	14.32%	
Independent	Chana Bappaiah	1,408	3.88%	
Margin of victory		2,152	5.93%	
Turnout		36,279	46.87%	
Registered electors		77,396		
INC win (new seat)				

=== 1955 ===
1955 Andhra State Legislative Assembly election: Narasannapeta
Party	Candidate	Votes	%	±%
KLP	Simma Jagannadham	9,902	40.83	New
CPI	Vandana Satyanarayana	6,847	28.24	New
Independent	Muddada Latchunnaidu	6,598	27.21	▲9.1
Independent	Pudipeddi Subbarao	903	3.72	New
Majority		3,055	12.59	▲6.66
Turnout		24,250	44.96	▼1.91
KLP gain from INC		Swing		

=== 1962 ===
1962 Andhra Pradesh Legislative Assembly election: Narasannapeta
Party	Candidate	Votes	%	±%
SWA	Simma Jagannadham	20,879	56.88	▲16.05
INC	Ponnana Veerannaidu	15,822	16.05	New
Majority		5,057	13.77	▲1.18
Turnout		36,701		
SWA hold		Swing		

=== 1967 ===
1967 Andhra Pradesh Legislative Assembly election: Narasannapeta
Party	Candidate	Votes	%	±%
SWA	Simma Jagannadham	21,866	49.76	▼7.12
INC	M.V.V. Appalanaidu	12,756	29.03	▼14.08
Independent	T.V.K. Gupta	7,841	17.84	New
Independent	K.V. Murty	1,480	3.37	New
Majority		9,110	20.73	▲6.96
Turnout		43,943	72.50	
SWA hold		Swing		

=== 1972 ===
1972 Andhra Pradesh Legislative Assembly election: Narasannapeta
Party	Candidate	Votes	%	±%
INC	Baggu Sarojanamma	19,441	42.58	▲13.55
Independent	Jagannadham Simma	16,987	37.20	New
SWA	Dharmana Lajapatiraiv	9,230	20.22	▼29.54
Majority		2,454	12.4	▼8.33
Turnout		45,658	65.34	▼7.16
INC gain from SWA		Swing		

=== 1978 ===
1978 Andhra Pradesh Legislative Assembly election: Narasannapeta
Party	Candidate	Votes	%	±%
INC(I)	Dola Seetaramulu	28,123	43.6	▲1.02
JP	Simma Jagannadham	22,397	34.7	New
INC	Baggu Sarojinamma	12,844	19.9	▼22.68
Independent	Gudiya Ramulu	1,194	1.9	New
Majority		5,726	8.6	▲3.22
Turnout		66,507	79.1	▲13.76
INC(I) hold		Swing		

=== 1983 ===
1983 Andhra Pradesh Legislative Assembly election: Narasannapeta
Party	Candidate	Votes	%	±%
TDP	Simma Prabhakara Rao	38,627	58.1	New
INC	Dola Seetaramulu	27,911	42.0	▼1.6
Majority		10,716	15.7	▲7.1
Turnout		68,051	75.5	▼3.6
TDP gain from INC		Swing		

=== 1985 ===
1985 Andhra Pradesh Legislative Assembly election: Narasannapeta
Party	Candidate	Votes	%	±%
TDP	Simma Prabhakara Rao	37,653	51.5	▼6.6
INC	Dharmana Prasada Rao	35,491	48.5	▲6.5
Majority		2,162	2.9	▼12.8
Turnout		74,697	79.9	▲4.4
TDP hold		Swing		

=== 1989 ===
1989 Andhra Pradesh Legislative Assembly election: Narasannapeta
Party	Candidate	Votes	%	±%
INC	Dharmana Prasada Rao	50,580	58.6	▲10.1
TDP	Simma Prabhakara Rao	35,688	41.4	▼7.1
Majority		14,892	16.7	▲13.8
Turnout		89,132	79.3	▼0.6
INC gain from TDP		Swing		

=== 1994 ===
1994 Andhra Pradesh Legislative Assembly election: Narasannapeta
Party	Candidate	Votes	%	±%
TDP	Lakshmanarao Baggu	48,286	53.1	▲11.7
INC	Dharmana Prasada Rao	40,315	44.3	▼14.3
BJP	Simma Chalapati Rao	678	0.7	New
Independent	Nagavarapu Nageswara Rao	615	0.7	New
Independent	B.V. Reddy Babu	574	0.6	New
Independent	Bongu Suryanarayana	267	0.3	New
Independent	Chintada Dharmarao	162	0.2	New
Independent	Kinjarapu Sriramulu	116	0.1	New
Majority		7,971	8.6	▼8.1
Turnout		93,002	77.4	▼1.9
TDP gain from INC		Swing		

=== 1999 ===
1999 Andhra Pradesh Legislative Assembly election: Narasannapeta
Party	Candidate	Votes	%	±%
INC	Dharmana Prasada Rao	48,328	52.6	▲8.3
TDP	Lakshmanarao Baggu	42,558	46.3	▼6.8
Ajeya Bharat Party	Boina Sumati	810	0.9	
Independent	Appa Rao	155	0.2	New
Independent	Kona Rao	52	0.1	New
Majority		5,770	6.1	▼2.5
Turnout		94,349	73.1	▼4.3
INC hold		Swing	▲7.5	

=== 2004 ===
2004 Andhra Pradesh Legislative Assembly election: Narasannapeta
Party	Candidate	Votes	%	±%
INC	Dharmana Krishna Das	52,312	53.5	▲0.9
TDP	Baggu Lakshmana Rao	43,444	44.4	▼1.9
Majority		8,868	9.1	▲3.0
Turnout		97,660	81.4	▲8.3
INC hold		Swing	▲1.4	

=== 2009 ===
2009 Andhra Pradesh Legislative Assembly election: Narasannapeta
Party	Candidate	Votes	%	±%
INC	Dharmana Krishna Das	60,426	44.2	▼9.3
TDP	Baggu Lakshmana Rao	42,837	31.3	▼13.1
PRP	Dola Jagan	25,280	18.5	New
BJP	Tulasi Rao Pedada	2,651	1.9	New
Pyramid Party of India	Matta Satish Chakravarthi	1,363	1.0	New
BSP	Rajakumar Duvvara	1,360	1.0	New
LSP	Telugu Nageswara Rao	1,103	0.8	New
Majority		17,589	12.8	▲3.7
Turnout		1,36,713	79.5	▼1.9
INC hold		Swing	▲1.9	

=== 2012 ===
2012 Andhra Pradesh Legislative Assembly by-election: Narasannapeta
Party	Candidate	Votes	%	±%
YSRCP	Dharmana Krishna Das	78,834	39.0	New
INC	Dharmana Rama Das	66,597	33.7	▼10.5
TDP	S. S. Babo	32,401	23.2	▼8.1
BJP	S.R.T. Rao	2,149	1.5	▼0.4
Majority		17,311	12.4	▼0.4
Turnout		1,39,765	79.9	▲0.4
YSRCP gain from INC		Swing		

== See also ==
- List of constituencies of Andhra Pradesh Legislative Assembly
