= Nimmagadda Prasad =

Indian businessman

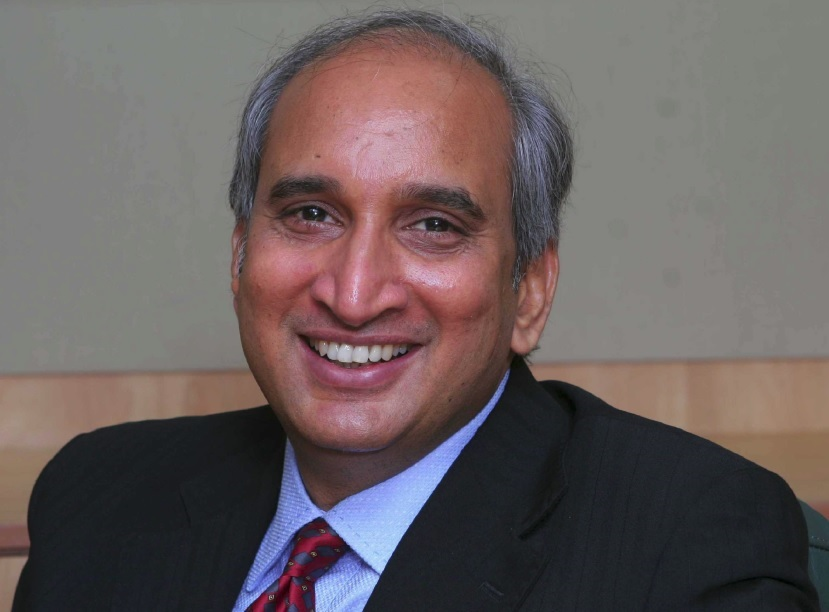
- Born: 11 October 1961 (age 64); Krishna District, Andhra Pradesh, India
- Education: Delhi University; Institute of Management Technology, Ghaziabad
- Occupation: Entrepreneur

Nimmagadda Prasad (born 11 October 1961) is an Indian industrialist from Andhra Pradesh, India. He is known for his ventures in the Pharmaceutical and Television industries, and is involved in philanthropic activities through Nimmagadda Foundation.

With master's degrees in Physics and Business Administration, Nimmagadda made a beginning as a company executive.

After 15 years in the multinational pharmaceutical environment, Nimmagadda acquired a pharmaceutical company in Hyderabad, Matrix Laboratories Limited. Under Nimmagadda, it became one of the major pharmaceutical companies in India.

In a span of 6 years, Nimmagadda built Matrix to a US$1.03 billion enterprise before it was acquired by US-based Mylan N.V. in 2006.

Nimmagadda has played a vital role in establishing Care Hospitals and Asian Institute of Gastroenterology (AIG), two leading healthcare centres started in Hyderabad. He served as a board member and was also an investor in both.

Nimmagadda continued his entrepreneurial journey by acquiring Maa TV in 2006, along with Nagarjuna being the largest shareholder of the channel, and made it a leading Telugu General Entertainment Channel network. The revenue of the company has grown to ₹3.5 billion (equivalent to ₹11 billion or US$120 million in 2023) in 7 years.

In 2015, Maa TV was acquired by Star India, a wholly owned subsidiary of Rupert Murdoch-owned 21st Century Fox for a consideration of about ₹23 billion (equivalent to ₹35 billion or US$360 million in 2023).

In 2008, Nimmagadda joined as a local partner with the Ras al-Khaimah for the implementing of a mega infrastructure project under the umbrella of VANPIC for the development of a world-class port-based integrated industrial corridor in the coastal region of Andhra Pradesh. This project was expected to transform the hitherto agri-based Guntur and Prakasam districts of Andhra Pradesh into major industrial hubs. The Ras Al Khaimah Investment Authority (RAKIA) has been attempting to enforce a judgement obtained in UAE courts for recovering over 600 crores including interest accrued. With regards to VANPIC project, Nimmagadda is embroiled in the alleged disproportionate assets case against Y. S. Jaganmohan Reddy, president of YSR Congress.

Currently, Nimmagadda has forayed into sports as a business by partnering with Sachin Tendulkar, Chiranjeevi and Allu Arvind. Their Consortium owns teams across different sports:

- Football team, Kerala Blasters, a team in the Indian super league.
- Badminton team, Benguluru Blasters, in the Premier Badminton League (PBL).
- Lately, they have acquired a team in the Pro Kabaddi League, Tamil Thalaivas. It's one of the four new teams introduced in season 5 of the league.

The consortium actively promotes grassroots and youth development programs for all these sports.

Nimmagadda contributed substantially towards the establishment of Pullela Gopichand’s badminton academy in its formative years.

In 2006, Nimmagadda sold off his majority shares in Matrix Pharmaceutical to Mylan Laboratories, USA, a large generic Pharmaceutical Company. For his achievements, the state government has honoured him with the "Best Management Award" in 2006. On the other hand, in 2012, he was jailed during CBI's investigation on Y. S. Jaganmohan Reddy's Disproportionate Assets, for allegedly having paid ₹8.5 billion (equivalent to ₹14 billion or US$150 million in 2023) on a quid pro quo amounting to ₹14.26 billion (equivalent to ₹24 billion or US$250 million in 2023) investments in VANPIC and other firms held by him, during Y. S. Rajasekhara Reddy's government. However, these assets were subsequently attached by the Enforcement Directorate of India, and Nimmagadda was granted bail after seventeen months.

== Early life ==
Son of an army officer, Nimmagadda obtained his BSc degree from Babu Jagjivanram Govt. College, Hyderabad, and then his MSc from the University of Delhi, followed by a post graduate diploma in management from Institute of Management Technology, Ghaziabad.

Nimmagadda started his career as a management trainee in Indian Molasses Company in Delhi (an associate of United Molasses Company, UK) in 1984 and was promoted to salesman at Rhone Poulenc Chemicals (the company later merged with Hoechst AG to form Aventis, and then to Vorin Laboratories as general manager of marketing in 1993, from his continuous efforts was elevated to managing director in 1995. When Indian pharma market leader Ranbaxy Ltd. acquired Vorin, Nimmagadda was re-designated Senior managing director and chief executive officer.

== Matrix Laboratories ==
In 2000, Nimmagadda took over the sick pharmaceuticals company Herren Drugs, and renamed it Matrix Laboratories, and obtained US FDA clearance for the manufacturing facilities in Hyderabad. Matrix grew dramatically through a series of mergers and acquisitions. Nimmagadda acquired Medicorp Technologies in May 2003, Vorin Labs in September 2003, Vera Laboratories, Fine Drugs & Chemicals the same year 2004 and a controlling stake in Concord Biotech in 2006. Nimmagadda set his eyes on the global pharma-scape by acquiring Belgium-based Docpharma in June 2005, and a controlling stake in China's McChem Group. He also floated a JV South Africa's Aspen Pharmacare in September 2005, and picked 43% stake in Switzerland's Explora Laboratories SA the same year.

In 2006, Nimmagadda sold off his majority shares in Matrix to Mylan Laboratories, US, a large generic pharmaceutical company. From an initial investment of ₹30 million (equivalent to ₹96 million or US$1.0 million in 2023), Nimmagadda retained 5% in Matrix, and made about ₹5.7 billion (equivalent to ₹18 billion or US$190 million in 2023) in the transaction in which Mylan picked up a 71.5% stake in Matrix laboratories.

== Philanthropy ==
Nimmagadda implemented his belief that 'the best way to enhance knowledge and wealth is to share it' by sharing his personal wealth of 2 million shares worth around ₹300 million (equivalent to ₹960 million or US$10 million in 2023) with his staff for their housing and children's education through the Matrix Employees Welfare Association (MEWA).

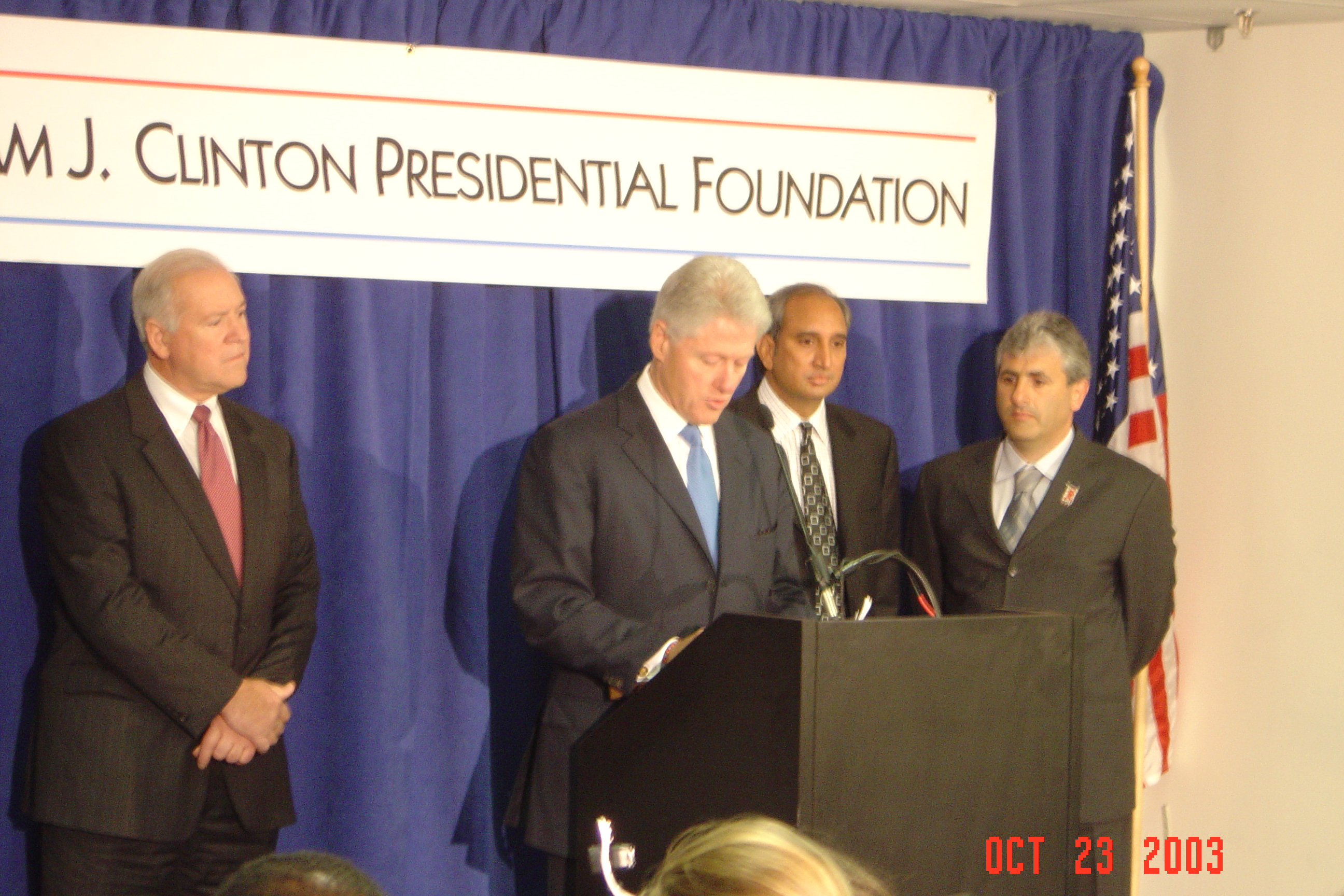
Clinton Foundation's Low cost HIV drugs initiative- Nimmagadda's Matrix part of it.

He is known in the social world for his contribution through “Project Hope” in developing cost effective medicines for HIV/AIDS treatment. Matrix signed a major deal with the Clinton Foundation for the supply of anti-AIDS drugs as part of the latter's initiatives in Developing Countries.

Pullela Gopichand's unwavering commitment that made his academy a powerhouse of badminton was backed and part funded by Nimmagadda. In the early days when he was struggling to raise funds, Nimmagadda saw the need to develop and encourage an alternative sport to Cricket and donated ₹50 million (equivalent to ₹170 million or US$1.8 million in 2023) to the Pullela Gopichand academy. The academy produced world class players: Saina Nehwal, Srikanth Kidambi, Parupalli Kashyap, P. V. Sindhu, Arundhati Pantawane, Gurusai Datt and Arun Vishnu.

== Other investments ==
Subsequently, Nimmagadda invested his capital in healthcare – CARE hospitals and Asian Institute of Gastroenterology. He also invested in stent manufacturer Relisys, and some genomic research-based companies. In the media business, he invested in MAA TV.

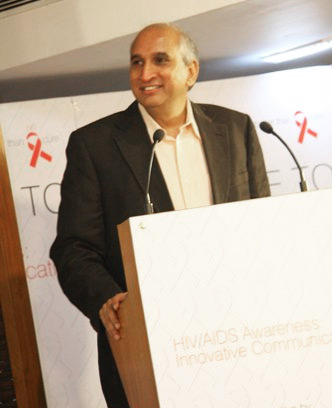
Nimmagadda at TeachAids launch in 2010

Nimmagadda was on the executive board of the Indian School of Business(ISB), Hyderabad, besides his association with several academic, research and business organisations. After his arrests, he had to resign from most such posts, such as the Indian School of Business.

== Arrest and attachment of properties ==
On 17 May 2012, Nimmagadda Prasad was questioned for several days and eventually arrested by the CBI. He was lodged in Chanchalguda jail, where he was always seen carrying a bottle of mineral water. After several failed attempts, he was eventually granted bail after seventeen months, in October 2013.

In March 2014, in one of the largest criminal actions under the Prevention of Money Laundering Act, the Enforcement Directorate (ED) attached about 15 billion of assets of Nimmangada Prasad and his companies: G2 corporate Services Ltd, Alpha villas Pvt Ltd, Alpha Avenues Pvt Ltd, Gilchrist Investment Pvt Ltd, Suguni Constructions Pvt Ltd and Beta Avenues Pvt Ltd. ED claimed that Nimmagadda had obtained illegal benefits of ₹14.26 billion (equivalent to ₹23 billion or US$240 million in 2023) in his firms, and made the quid pro quo investment worth ₹8.55 billion (equivalent to ₹14 billion or US$140 million in 2023) into Jagan Reddy's companies.

On 22 Sep 2016, Bahamas papers revealed that he has 28 secret companies at Secundrabad. Prasad and Prakash Nimmagadda, with interests in real estate to pharmaceuticals, is another set of names. Nimmagadda is already being probed by the Central Bureau of Investigation in another case, which had also arrested him in May 2012, and got bail 17 months later, the newspaper said.

"I would not like to discuss this issue over phone. We can meet personally and talk about it. I will tell you everything," Nimmagadda has been quoted as telling the Express. This was followed by calls by his office later canceling a total of three appointments that had been fixed, the Express said.

Despite facing challenges due to political ties and ambitious ventures, which even led to his arrest, he navigated through controversy. In a pivotal moment on July 28, 2022, the Telangana High Court dismissed the Central Bureau of Investigation charge sheet in the VANPIC case. Then, in a major breakthrough on July 7, 2023, the Enforcement Directorate liberated his assets, worth Rs 11,000 crore, from attachment, signifying his remarkable resilience amidst adversity.

== See also ==
- Nimmagadda Foundation
