= Dharmana Krishna Das =

Indian politician

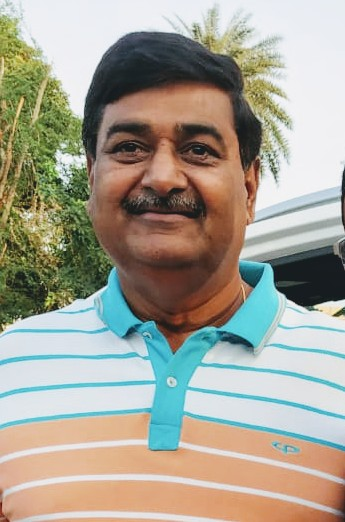

9th Deputy Chief Minister of Andhra Pradesh
- In office 22 July 2020 – 7 April 2022
- Governor: Biswabhusan Harichandan
- Chief Minister: Y. S. Jagan Mohan Reddy
- Preceded by: Pilli Subhash Chandra Bose
- Succeeded by: Kottu Satyanarayana

Minister for Revenue, Stamps and Registration Government of Andhra Pradesh
- In office 22 July 2020 – 7 April 2022
- Governor: Biswabhusan Harichandan
- Chief Minister: Y. S. Jagan Mohan Reddy
- Preceded by: Pilli Subhash Chandra Bose
- Succeeded by: Dharmana Prasada Rao

Member of Legislative Assembly Andhra Pradesh
- Incumbent
- Assumed office 2019
- Preceded by: Ramanamurthy Baggu
- Constituency: Narasannapeta
- In office 2004–2014
- Preceded by: Dharmana Prasada Rao
- Succeeded by: Ramanamurthy Baggu
- Constituency: Narasannapeta

Personal details
- Party: YSR Congress Party
- Other political affiliations: Indian National Congress
- Spouse: Dharmana Padma Priya
- Children: 2
- Occupation: Politician

Dharmana Krishna Das is an Indian politician from Andhra Pradesh who served as the 9th Deputy Chief Minister of Andhra Pradesh and Minister of Revenue in Chief Minister Y. S. Jaganmohan Reddy's government. Krishna Das was elected to the legislative assembly from Narasannapeta in the 2019 general elections.
