= Gunda Lakshmi Devi =

Indian politician

Member of Legislative Assembly Andhra Pradesh
- In office 2014–2019
- Preceded by: Dharmana Prasada Rao
- Succeeded by: Dharmana Prasada Rao
- Constituency: Srikakulam

Personal details
- Born: 1961 (age 64–65)
- Party: Telugu Desam Party (2014-2026) YSR Congress Party (since October 2026)
- Spouse: Gunda Appala Suryanarayana
- Parent: Nikku Appalaswamy Naidu (father)
- Occupation: Politician

Gunda Lakshmi Devi is an Indian politician from Andhra Pradesh. She is a former member of Andhra Pradesh Legislative Assembly representing Srikakulam Assembly constituency from 2014 to 2019. She was denied a ticket from TDP to contest the 2024 Assembly election. Following the decision of the Party, her followers burnt the flags and literature of TDP. She said she would contest as an independent candidate.

== Early life ==
Devi is from Srikakulam. She is from Velama community. After her husband, Gunda Appala Suryanarayana's, she entered politics and made her debut in the 2014 elections. Her son is resides in the United States.

== Career ==
Devi won the 2014 Andhra Pradesh Legislative Assembly election on Telugu Desam Party ticket defeating Dharmana Prasada Rao of YSR Congress Party by a margin of 24,131 votes.

Earlier, she served as Srikakulam Municipality vice chairperson and chairperson.
