= VANPIC =

Upcoming industrial park in India

Vadarevu and Nizampatnam Industrial Corridor (VANPIC) is an upcoming industrial park located between Bapatla district and Prakasam district in Andhra Pradesh, India. It is spread over 13,000 acres. It is under CBI investigation for land acquisition and other allegations. Around 4000 acres were acquired for port development. Large tracts of land were acquired from local farmers. In April 2011, the property consultant, Jones Lang LaSalle, estimated the 13,000 acres at ₹1,426 crores.

== History ==
The land was acquired by the government in 2008.

== Location ==
It is located near Nizampatnam in Guntur district.

== Investigation ==
Former minister Mopidevi Venkataramana was arrested in the case by the CBI, and minister Dharmana Prasad Rao resigned over allegations. Another company, VANPIC projects was started by industrialist, Nimmagadda Prasad and Ras Al Khaimah (RAK group), and the company was allotted 24,000 acres by the government.

The mechanisms of the large scale corruption in the case was highlighted in the fourth charge sheet filed by the CBI in the Y. S. Jaganmohan Reddy corruption case. The charge sheet relates to the VANPIC project:

quid-pro-quo investments made by industrialist Nimmagadda Prasad to the tune of ₹854 crore into the companies of YS Jagan and allotment of 22,000 acres of land to Nimmagadda Prasad in violation of prevailing rules and regulations.

The "suitcase company" methodology was succinctly described by Supreme Court of India Chief justice P. Sathasivam.:

The investigation disclosed the payment of illegal gratification of ₹30 crore to Y.S. Jagan Mohan Reddy (A-1) by Nimmagadda Prasad (A-3) for the wrongful gain obtained by A-3 from the Government of Andhra Pradesh in connection with awarding a project consisting of development of two Sea Ports and an Industrial Corridor as VANPIC Project and falsification of documents to cover up the said payment etc.

On July 28, 2022, Vanpic case: HC strikes down CBI charge sheet.
