= Devineni =

Telugu surnames

Devineni (Telugu: దేవినేని) is a Telugu surname. Notable people with the surname include:

- Devineni Nehru (1954–2017), Indian politician
- Devineni Uma Maheswara Rao (born 1962), Indian politician
- Devineni Venkata Ramana (1960–1999), Indian politician
- Prasad Devineni (born 1975), Indian film producer
