= Tangirala Prabhakara Rao =

Indian politician

Member of Legislative Assembly, Andhra Pradesh
- In office 2009–2014
- Preceded by: Devineni Uma Maheswara Rao
- Succeeded by: Tangirala Sowmya
- Constituency: Nandigama

Personal details
- Party: Telugu Desam Party
- Children: 3 including Tangirala Sowmya (daughter)

Tangirala Prabhakara Rao (1950 – 16 June 2014) was an Indian politician from Andhra Pradesh. He was a former two time member of the Andhra Pradesh Legislative Assembly from Nandigama Assembly constituency, which was reserved for Scheduled Caste community, in Krishna district representing the Telugu Desam Party.

== Early life ==
Rao was from Paritala village, Krishna district, Andhra Pradesh. He is the son of the late Shadrach. He was a lawyer. He had one son and two daughters. One of his daughters, Tangirala Sowmya, became an MLA from Nandigama seat after his death. He was with the Telugu Desam Party since its inception in 1983.

== Career ==
Rao won from Nandigama Assembly constituency in the 2014 Andhra Pradesh Legislative Assembly election representing the Telugu Desam Party. He polled 78,721 votes and defeated his nearest rival, Monditoka Jagan Mohana Rao of the YSR Congress Party, by a margin of 5,212 votes. He became an MLA for the first time winning the Nandigama seat in the 2009 Andhra Pradesh Legislative Assembly election. In 2009, he polled 60,489 votes and defeated his nearest rival, Parameswara Rao Velpula of the YSR Congress Party, by a margin of 5,171 votes.

=== Death ===
Rao died of heart attack in Nandigama on 16 June 2014.
