= 1983 Andhra Pradesh Legislative Assembly election =

- 5 January 1983 (293 seats) and 27 February 1983 (1 seat)

All 294 seats in the Andhra Pradesh Legislative Assembly 148 seats needed for a majority
- Registered: 31,846,694
- Turnout: 21,560,642 (67.70%) ▼5.22%
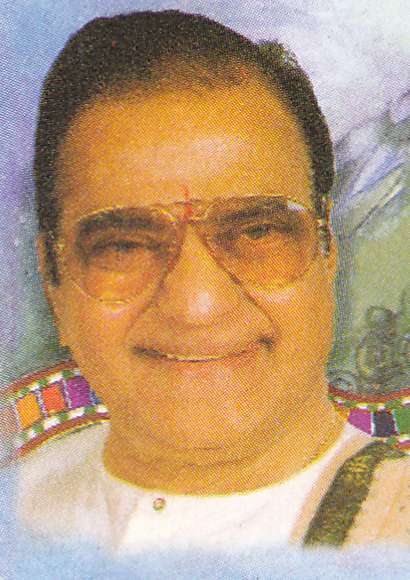

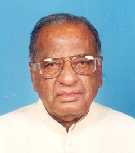
	Majority party	Minority party
Leader	N. T. Rama Rao	Kotla Vijaya Bhaskara Reddy
Party	TDP	INC(I)
Leader since	1982	1982
Leader's seat	Gudivada (won; retained), Tirupati (won; vacated)	Yemmiganur (won)
Last election	Party did not exist	175 seats, 39.25%
Seats won	201	60
Seat change	New party	▼115
Popular vote	9,777,222	7,090,907
Percentage	46.30%	33.58%
Swing	New party	▼5.67%
- 1983 Andhra Pradesh Legislative Assembly election results

- Party-wise structure
Chief minister before election
Kotla Vijaya Bhaskara Reddy
INC(I)
Chief minister after election
N. T. Rama Rao
TDP

The 1983 Andhra Pradesh Legislative Assembly election was held on 5 January, having been preponed from its originally scheduled date in August 1983.The results were announced on 7 January 1983. The election was held to elect all 294 members of the Andhra Pradesh Legislative Assembly.

The election was swept by the Telugu Desam Party (TDP), a regional party formed in March 1982, nine months ahead the election by the Indian film actor N. T. Rama Rao (NTR). The TDP won a historic 201 seats and formed the first non-Congress government in the state since its formation in 1956. NTR was sworn in as the 10th Chief Minister of Andhra Pradesh on 9 January 1983, becoming the first non-Congress chief minister of the state.

== Background ==
Following the Emergency and the subsequent 1977 Indian general election, Indira Gandhi and the Indian National Congress (Requisitionists) suffered a major electoral defeat all over India but managed to sweep the state of state of Andhra Pradesh with securing 41 out of 42 Lok Sabha constituencies. In 1978, Indira Gandhi formed a breakaway faction known as the Indian National Congress (Indira), popularly known as Congress, which rapidly regained political prominence. The party achieved a sweeping victory in the 1978 Andhra Pradesh Legislative Assembly election, while the Janata Party emerged as the principle opposition in the state. Congress subsequently returned to the power nationally in the 1980 Indian general election under the leadership of Indira Gandhi.

During the late 1970s and early 1980s, the Central Government's repeated use of Article 356 of the Constitution of India attracted criticism from opposition parties and constitutional scholars, who argued that it weakened federalism and democratic autonomy by allowing the dismissal of elected state governments through the imposition of President's rule. In Andhra Pradesh, political instability within the Congress government further contributed to public dissatisfaction. In 1982 alone, Andhra Pradesh witnessed three different Chief Ministers within the span of a single year, with Tanguturi Anjaiah serving until February, being succeeded by Bhavanam Venkatarami Reddy until September, who was later replaced by Kotla Vijaya Bhaskara Reddy. These frequent changes reinforced the perception that the state leadership was heavily dependant on the Congress high command in New Delhi rather than on an independent state-level mandate.

A political controversy occurred in 1982 at Begumpet Airport during the private visit of Rajiv Gandhi to Hyderabad, who was then serving as the general secretary of the Congress part. Chief Minister Tanguturi Anjaiah has organised an elaborate reception for Rajiv Gandhi, attended by ministers, party workers and cultural performers. Contemporary reports stated that Rajiv Gandhi criticised the arrangements and airport protocol, leading to allegations that Tanguturi Anjaiah had been publicly humiliated in front of party leaders and officials.

=== Formation of the Telugu Desam Party ===
Growing political instability in the state and increasing regional sentiment during the early 1980s contributed to the rise of a regional alternative to the Congress. A Telugu film actor N. T. Rama Rao, populary known as NTR founded the Telugu Desam Party (TDP) on 29 March 1982 in Hyderabad, then the capital of Andhra Pradesh. Before entering politics, NTR was one of the most popular actors in Telugu cinema and had taken part in relief and fundraising efforts following the 1977 Andhra Pradesh cyclone. The party was founded on the idea of Telugu Vari Atma Gouravam (transl. self-respect of the Telugu people), calling for greater respect for Telugu people, stronger powers for states within India's federal system and an alternative to Congress rule in Andhra Pradesh.

After its formation, the TDP carried out a statewide campaign led by NTR in the Chaitanya Ratham (transl. Awakening Chariot), a specially modified vehicle driven by his son, Nandamuri Harikrishna, from which he addressed public meetings across the state. The party promised rice at Rs. 2 per kilogram for poor households and subsidised electricity for farmers at a flat rate of Rs. 50 per horsepower per annum.

The TDP gave election tickets to many first-time candidates, including educated professionals, members of backward classes, and people with little previous political experience. Within a short period, the TDP emerged as the main challenger to the Congress ahead of the election.

== Parties and alliances ==
Alliance/Party		Flag	Symbol	Leader	Seats contested	
Indian National Congress (Indira)				Gaddam Venkatswamy	294	
Left-Janata Alliance	Communist Party of India				152	48
Left-Janata Alliance	Janata Party				152	43
Left-Janata Alliance	Lok Dal				152	33
Left-Janata Alliance	Communist Party of India (Marxist)				152	28
Telugu Desam Party				N. T. Rama Rao	294	
Bharatiya Janata Party				P. V. Chalapathi Rao	80	

== Results ==
=== Results by party ===
Party	Popular vote			Seats		
Party	Votes	%	±pp	Contested	Won	+/−
Telugu Desam Party	9, 777, 222	46.30	new	294	201	new
Indian National Congress (Indira)	7,090,907	33.58	▼5.67	294	60	▼115
Communist Party of India (Marxist)	425,109	2.01	▼0.70	28	5	▼3
Communist Party of India	588,144	2.79	▲0.30	48	4	▼2
Indian National Congress (Jagjivan)	119,372	0.57	new	86	1	new
Janata Party	203,478	0.96	▼27.89	43	1	Steady
Bharatiya Janata Party	582,464	2.76	new	80	3	new
Other parties	238,168	1.13	N/A	42	0	N/A
Independents					19	▲4
Total	21,117,111	100.00	N/A	1,720	294	N/A
Vote statistics
Valid votes	21,117,111	97.94				
Invalid votes	443,531	2.06				
Votes cast/ turnout	21,560,642	67.70				
Abstentions	10,286,052	32.30				
Registered voters	31,846,694					

=== Results by district ===
District	Seats						
District	Seats	TDP	INC	CPI	CPM	BJP	OTH
Srikakulam	12	11	1	—N/a	—N/a	—N/a	—N/a
Vizianagaram	12	10	2	—N/a	—N/a	—N/a	—N/a
Visakhapatnam	13	12	1	—N/a	—N/a	—N/a	—N/a
East Godavari	21	21	—N/a	—N/a	—N/a	—N/a	—N/a
West Godavari	16	15	—N/a	—N/a	—N/a	—N/a	1
Krishna	17	12	4	—N/a	—N/a	—N/a	1
Guntur	19	17	—N/a	—N/a	—N/a	—N/a	2
Prakasam	13	10	1	—N/a	—N/a	—N/a	2
Nellore	11	10	—N/a	—N/a	—N/a	1	—N/a
Chittoor	15	14	—N/a	—N/a	—N/a	—N/a	1
Cuddapah	11	6	3	—N/a	—N/a	—N/a	2
Anantapur	14	12	1	—N/a	—N/a	—N/a	1
Kurnool	13	8	4	—N/a	—N/a	—N/a	1
Mahabubnagar	13	6	6	—N/a	—N/a	—N/a	1
Ranga Reddy	6	—N/a	6	—N/a	—N/a	—N/a	—N/a
Hyderabad	13	7	—N/a	—N/a	—N/a	1	5
Medak	10	3	6	—N/a	—N/a	—N/a	1
Nizamabad	9	7	2	—N/a	—N/a	—N/a	—N/a
Adilabad	9	4	3	1	—N/a	—N/a	1
Karimnagar	13	7	6	—N/a	—N/a	—N/a	—N/a
Warangal	13	4	7	—N/a	1	1	—N/a
Khammam	9	1	2	3	2	—N/a	1
Nalgonda	12	4	5	—N/a	2	—N/a	1
Total	294	201	60	4	5	3	21

=== Results by constituency ===
District	Constituency		Winner				Runner Up				Margin
District	No.	Name	Candidate	Party	Votes	%	Candidate	Party	Votes	%	Margin
Srikakulam	1	Ichchapuram	Mandava Venkata Krishna Rao	TDP	28,168	47.40	Labala Sundara Rao	INC(I)	19,062	32.08	9,106
Srikakulam	2	Sompeta	Majji Narayana Rao	INC(I)	31,314	45.78	Gouthu Latchanna	LKD	27,271	39.87	4,043
Srikakulam	3	Tekkali	Attada Janardhana Rao	TDP	35,274	56.28	Sattaru Lokanadham Naidu	INC(I)	15,558	24.82	19,716
Srikakulam	4	Harishchandrapuram	Kinjarapu Yerran Naidu	TDP	32,284	47.29	Kannepalli Appalanarasimha Bhukta	INC(I)	18,094	26.50	14,190
Srikakulam	5	Narasannapeta	Simma Prabhakara Rao	TDP	38,627	58.05	Dola Seetaramulu	INC(I)	27,911	41.95	10,716
Srikakulam	6	Pathapatnam	Tota Tulasida Naidu	TDP	24,264	37.81	Kalamata Mohana Rao	INC(I)	17,923	27.93	6,341
Srikakulam	7	Kothuru (ST)	Nimmaka Gopala Rao	TDP	31,853	53.32	Viswasarayi Narainha Rao	INC(I)	21,311	35.67	10,542
Vizianagaram	8	Naguru (ST)	Satrucharla Vijaya Rama Raju	INC(I)	25,361	45.29	Puvvala Somandora	IC(S)	24,738	44.17	623
Vizianagaram	9	Parvathipuram	Mariserla Venkatarami Naidu	TDP	37,553	59.12	Doddi Parasuramu	INC(I)	17,815	28.04	19,738
Vizianagaram	10	Salur (ST)	Boniya Rajaiah	TDP	32,684	61.15	Dukka Appanna	INC(I)	16,560	30.98	16,124
Vizianagaram	11	Bobbili	S. V. China Appala Naidu	TDP	40,610	60.15	Vasireddi Krishnamurthy Naidu	INC(I)	23,660	35.04	16,950
Vizianagaram	12	Therlam	Thendu Jayaprakash	TDP	45,072	62.67	Satharu Narayanappala	INC(I)	20,823	28.95	24,249
Srikakulam	13	Vunukuru	Kimidi Kalavenkata Rao	TDP	47,735	64.09	Palavalasa Rajasekharam	INC(I)	24,354	32.70	23,381
Srikakulam	14	Palakonda (SC)	Gonipati Syama Rao	TDP	34,670	63.16	Jampu Latchayya	INC(I)	15,585	28.39	19,085
Srikakulam	15	Amadalavalasa	Thammineni Seetharam	TDP	25,557	40.47	Pydi Sreerama Murty	INC(I)	21,284	33.71	4,273
Srikakulam	16	Srikakulam	Tangi Satyanarayana	TDP	49,100	67.72	Chigilipalli Suamala Rao	INC(I)	11,821	16.30	37,279
Srikakulam	17	Etcherla (SC)	K. Pratibha Bharati	TDP	40,894	66.91	Yamala Surya Narayana	INC(I)	15,832	25.90	25,062
Vizianagaram	18	Cheepurupalli	Tripurana Venkata Ratnam	TDP	41,887	61.68	Gorle Sreeramulu Naidu	INC(I)	19,318	28.45	22,569
Vizianagaram	19	Gajapathinagaram	Jampana Satyanarayana Raju	TDP	23,223	33.52	Taddi Sanyasi Naidu	INC(I)	23,037	33.25	186
Vizianagaram	20	Vizianagaram	Ashok Gajapathi Raju	TDP	53,018	77.94	Prasadula Rama Krishna	INC(I)	12,626	18.56	40,392
Vizianagaram	21	Sathivada	Penumatsa Sambasiva Raju	INC(I)	37,036	51.60	Byreddi Surya Narayana	TDP	34,739	48.40	2,297
Vizianagaram	22	Bhogapuram	Pathivada Narayanaswamy Naidu	TDP	34,533	57.94	Kommuru Appadudora	INC(I)	25,070	42.06	10,463
Visakhapatnam	23	Bheemunipatnam	Pusapati Ananda Gajapati Raju	TDP	55,239	77.91	Datla Jagannadha Raju	INC(I)	15,663	22.09	39,576
Visakhapatnam	24	Visakhapatnam-I	Grandhi Madhavi	TDP	37,447	74.08	Sunkari Alwar Das	INC(I)	8,567	16.95	28,880
Visakhapatnam	25	Visakhapatnam-II	Eswarapu Vasudeva Rao	TDP	62,326	69.55	Palla Simhachalam	INC(I)	14,410	16.08	47,916
Visakhapatnam	26	Pendurthi	Patakamsetti Appalanarasimham	TDP	51,019	60.77	Dronamraju Satyanarayana	INC(I)	18,736	22.32	32,283
Vizianagaram	27	Uttarapalli	Kolla Appalanaidu	TDP	47,448	70.21	K. V. R. S. Padmanabha Raju	INC(I)	17,119	25.33	30,329
Vizianagaram	28	Srungavarapukota (ST)	Dukku Labudu Bariki	TDP	40,788	61.14	Vannepuri Ganganna Dora	INC(I)	13,603	20.39	27,185
Visakhapatnam	29	Paderu (ST)	Tammarba Chitti Naidu	INC(I)	8,810	31.02	Setti Lakshmanudu	TDP	6,242	21.98	2,568
Visakhapatnam	30	Madugula	Reddy Satyanarayana	TDP	35,439	53.92	Kuracha Ramunaidu	INC(I)	18,557	28.24	16,882
Visakhapatnam	31	Chodavaram	Gumuru Yerru Naidu	TDP	29,074	39.53	Gorle Kannam Naidu	INC(I)	19,792	26.91	9,282
Visakhapatnam	32	Anakapalli	Raja Kanna Babu	TDP	40,767	61.03	Malla Lakshminarayana	INC(I)	15,383	23.03	25,384
Visakhapatnam	33	Paravada	Paila Appalanaidu	TDP	46,239	68.45	Bhattam Sri Ramamurthy	INC(I)	17,493	25.89	28,746
Visakhapatnam	34	Elamanchili	K. K. V. Satyanarayana Raju	TDP	38,707	53.83	Veesam Sanyasi Naidu	INC(I)	30,879	42.95	7,829
Visakhapatnam	35	Payakaraopet (SC)	Gantela Sumana	TDP	34,030	60.91	Nelaparthi Ramarao	INC(I)	10,252	18.35	23,778
Visakhapatnam	36	Narsipatnam	Chintakayala Ayyanna Patrudu	TDP	38,490	50.65	Sagi Sri Raja Ramchandra Raju	INC(I)	37,498	49.35	992
Visakhapatnam	37	Chintapalle (ST)	Korabu Venkataratnam	TDP	14,206	31.15	Depuru Kondala Rao	INC(I)	12,322	27.02	1,884
East Godavari	38	Yellavaram (ST)	Chinnam Jogarao	TDP	17,605	41.82	Gorrela Prakash Rao	INC(I)	12,312	29.24	5,293
East Godavari	39	Burugupudi	Pendurthi Sambasiva Rao	TDP	52,330	68.89	Attili Ramarao	INC(I)	20,700	27.25	31,630
East Godavari	40	Rajahmundry	Gorantla Butchaiah Chowdary	TDP	50,779	62.46	Challa Appa Rao	INC(I)	13,428	16.52	37,351
East Godavari	41	Kadiam	Girajala Venkataswamy Naidu	TDP	57,502	66.02	Battina Subbarao	INC(I)	27,682	31.78	29,820
East Godavari	42	Jaggampeta	Thota Subbarao	TDP	47,085	62.21	Pantham Padmnabham	INC(I)	28,094	37.12	18,991
East Godavari	43	Peddapuram	Balasu Ramarao	TDP	48,509	63.88	Goli Ramarao	INC(I)	19,098	25.15	29,411
East Godavari	44	Prathipadu (East Godavari)	Mudragada Padmanabham	TDP	45,976	58.40	Varapula Subbarao	INC(I)	31,634	40.18	14,342
East Godavari	45	Tuni	Yanamala Rama Krishnudu	TDP	48,738	63.49	M. N. Vijayalakshmi Devi	INC(I)	27,058	35.25	21,680
East Godavari	46	Pithapuram	Venna Nageswararao	TDP	43,318	66.73	Koppana Venkata Chandra Mohan Rao	INC(I)	20,128	31.01	23,190
East Godavari	47	Sampara	Thirumani Satyalinga Nayaker	TDP	49,586	63.36	Matta Venkataramana	INC(I)	15,102	19.30	34,484
East Godavari	48	Kakinada	Gopala Krishna Murthy	TDP	69,499	79.01	Malladi Swami	INC(I)	13,868	15.77	55,631
East Godavari	49	Tallarevu	Chikkala Ramachandra Rao	TDP	46,542	64.91	Kommireddy Taradevi	INC(I)	14,243	19.86	32,299
East Godavari	50	Anaparthy	Nallamilli Moola Reddy	TDP	46,855	66.37	Padala Ammireddy	INC(I)	22,951	32.51	23,904
East Godavari	51	Ramachandrapuram	Ramachandra Raju Sri Raja Kakarla Poodi	TDP	39,186	51.21	Vundavili Satya Narayana Murthy Rayavaram Munsif	INC(I)	14,195	18.55	24,991
East Godavari	52	Alamuru	Valluri Narayanamurthy	TDP	55,614	65.39	Sangita Venkatareddy	INC(I)	27,978	32.90	27,636
East Godavari	53	Mummidivaram (SC)	Valtati Rajaskkubai	TDP	51,366	68.77	Moka Sri Vishnuprasada Rao	INC(I)	15,167	20.30	36,199
East Godavari	54	Allavaram (SC)	Aithabathula Jogeswara Venkata Buchi Maheswara Rao	TDP	31,598	49.02	Paramata Veera Raghavaulu	INC(I)	20,962	32.52	10,636
East Godavari	55	Amalapuram	Satyanarayana Rao	TDP	41,283	53.96	Kudupudi Prabhakar Rao	INC(I)	32,354	42.29	8,929
East Godavari	56	Kothapeta	Chirla Soma Sundara Reddy	TDP	39,887	54.24	Kosuri Ramakrishnam Raju	INC(I)	19,185	26.09	20,702
East Godavari	57	Nagaram (SC)	Undru Krishna Rao	TDP	41,860	61.56	Neethipudi Ganapathi Rao	INC(I)	24,095	35.44	17,765
East Godavari	58	Razole	Alluri Venkata Surya Narayana Raju	TDP	36,674	51.73	Rudraraju Bhimaraju	INC(I)	22,567	31.83	14,107
West Godavari	59	Narasapuram	Chegondi Harirama Jogaiah	TDP	43,119	54.18	Parakala Kalikamba	INC(I)	19,463	24.45	23,656
West Godavari	60	Palacole	Allu Venkata Satyanarayana	TDP	45,082	66.11	Vardhineedi Satyanarayana	INC(I)	18,507	27.14	26,575
West Godavari	61	Achanta (SC)	Kota Bhaskara Rao	TDP	45,631	64.28	Kota Dhanaraju	INC(I)	17,264	24.32	28,367
West Godavari	62	Bhimavaram	Penmetsa Venkata Narasimha Raju	TDP	61,765	73.15	Vegiraju Ramakrishnam Raju	INC(I)	20,577	24.37	41,188
West Godavari	63	Undi	Kalidindi Ramachandra Raju	TDP	53,944	71.47	Gottamukkala Ramachandra Raju	INC(I)	20,513	27.18	33,431
West Godavari	64	Penugonda	Pratti Manema	TDP	41,382	60.63	Vanka Satyanarayana	CPI	13,420	19.66	27,962
West Godavari	65	Tanuku	Chitturi Venkateswara Rao	TDP	39,501	49.34	Gannamani Satyanarayana Murthy	IND	35,403	44.22	4,098
West Godavari	66	Attili	Vegesna Kanaka Durga Venkata Satyanarayanaraju	TDP	53,144	69.73	Indukuri Ramakrishnamraju	INC(I)	21,996	28.86	31,148
West Godavari	67	Tadepalligudem	Eli Anjaneulu	TDP	61,310	74.77	Mylavarapu Rajabhaskararao	INC(I)	18,616	22.70	42,694
West Godavari	68	Ungutur	Kantamani Srinivasa Rao	TDP	53,755	64.53	Chintalapali Seeta Rama Chandra Vara Prasada Murty Raju	INC(I)	28,575	34.30	25,180
West Godavari	69	Dendulur	Garapati Sambasiva Rao	TDP	43,572	66.66	Neelam Charles	INC(I)	19,908	30.46	23,664
West Godavari	70	Eluru	Chennakesavulu Rangarao	TDP	62,657	74.76	Puli Venkata Satya Narayana	INC(I)	15,142	18.07	47,515
West Godavari	71	Gopalpuram (SC)	Karupati Vivekananda	TDP	52,098	72.83	Dasari Sarojini Devi	INC(I)	14,703	20.55	37,395
West Godavari	72	Kovvur	Pendyala Venkata Krishna Rao	TDP	65,893	79.32	Munshi Abdul Aziz	INC(I)	10,983	13.22	54,910
West Godavari	73	Polavaram (ST)	Modiam Lakshmana Rao	TDP	34,621	55.13	Punem Singannadora	INC(I)	25,004	39.82	9,617
West Godavari	74	Chintalapudi	Kotagiri Vidyadhara Rao	IND	30,329	39.87	K. L. N. Raju	TDP	23,142	30.42	7,187
Krishna	75	Jaggayyapet	Akkinemi Lokeswara Rao	TDP	25,815	37.23	Bodulluru Rama Rao	INC(I)	22,306	32.17	3,509
Krishna	76	Nandigama	Vasantha Nageswara Rao	TDP	37,117	51.31	Mukkapati Venkateswara Rao	INC(I)	26,619	36.80	10,498
Krishna	77	Vijayawada West	B. S. Jayaraju	TDP	35,449	36.14	Uppalapati Ramachandra Raju	CPI	33,911	34.57	1,538
Krishna	78	Vijayawada East	Adusumilli Jaiprakasha Rao	TDP	38,411	47.79	Jandyala Kameswari Shanker	INC(I)	23,534	29.28	14,877
Krishna	79	Kankipadu	Devineni Nehru	TDP	43,782	46.51	Akkineni Bhaskara Rao	INC(I)	28,339	30.10	15,443
Krishna	80	Mylavaram	Nimmagadda Satyanarayana	TDP	40,089	48.73	Chenamolu Venkata Rao	INC(I)	35,857	43.59	4,232
Krishna	81	Tiruvuru (SC)	Miryala Poornanand	TDP	31,507	42.12	Sri Kanthayya	INC(I)	28,994	38.76	2,513
Krishna	82	Nuzvid	Kotagiri Hanumantha Rao	IND	30,267	36.62	Paladugu Venkata Rao	INC(I)	25,924	31.37	4,343
Krishna	83	Gannavaram	Musunnuru Ratnabose	TDP	23,436	35.87	Kommineni Seshagiri Rao	INC(I)	22,225	34.01	1,211
Krishna	84	Vuyyur	K. P. Reddaiah	INC(I)	24,659	37.19	Kakani Ramohan Rao	TDP	21,567	32.53	3,092
Krishna	85	Gudivada	N. T. Rama Rao	TDP	53,906	64.94	Katari Satyanarayan Rao	INC(I)	27,368	32.97	26,538
Krishna	86	Mudinepalli	Pinnamaneni Koteswara Rao	INC(I)	38,033	52.71	Yerneni Sita Devi	TDP	30,819	42.71	7,214
Krishna	87	Kaikalur	Kanumuri Bapi Raju	INC(I)	34,603	49.02	Kamili Vittal Rao	TDP	33,800	47.88	803
Krishna	88	Malleswaram	Ankem Prabhakara Rao	TDP	26,802	39.43	Bnagadda Nirunjana Rao	INC(I)	25,630	37.70	1,172
Krishna	89	Bandar	Borra Venkataswami	TDP	43,098	56.52	Perni Krishna Murthy	INC(I)	17,757	23.29	25,341
Krishna	90	Nidumolu (SC)	Govada Mallikharjuna Rao	TDP	28,064	41.26	Koneru Ranga Rao	INC(I)	21,206	31.18	6,858
Krishna	91	Avanigadda	Mandali Venkata Krishna Rao	INC(I)	24,852	38.36	Vakkapattla Srirama Prasad	TDP	16,590	25.61	8,262
Guntur	92	Kuchinapudi	Mopidevi Nagabhushanam	TDP	33,936	55.15	Kesana Ramaswamy	INC(I)	19,164	31.14	14,772
Guntur	93	Repalle	Yadla Venkata Rao	TDP	38,875	62.18	Mandali Subrahmanyam	INC(I)	16,567	26.50	22,308
Guntur	94	Vemuru	Nadendla Bhaskara Rao	TDP	48,268	63.83	Yadkapati Venkat Rao	INC(I)	23,623	31.24	24,645
Guntur	95	Duggirala	Venkata Sivarama Krishna Reddy Mareddy	IND	43,252	63.16	Gollapudi Vendanta Rao	INC(I)	14,301	20.88	28,951
Guntur	96	Tenali	Annabathuni Sathyanarayana	TDP	53,729	68.13	Doddapaneni Indira	INC(I)	24,505	31.07	29,224
Guntur	97	Ponnur	Dhulipalla Veeraiah Chowdary	TDP	49,478	65.76	Gogineni Nageswara Rao	INC(I)	25,766	34.24	23,712
Guntur	98	Bapatla	C. V. Ramaraju	TDP	57,263	66.73	Kona Prabhakara Rao	INC(I)	27,831	32.43	29,432
Guntur	99	Prathipadu (Guntur)	Makineni Peda Rathaiah	TDP	41,885	59.09	Venkatappa Guntupalli Rao Appa Rao	INC(I)	28,491	40.19	13,394
Guntur	100	Guntur-I	Umaru Kanu Patanu	TDP	62,883	67.69	Lingamsetty Eswara Rao	INC(I)	21,519	23.17	41,364
Guntur	101	Guntur-II	Nissankararao Venkataratnam	TDP	42,472	57.40	Gade Durga Prasunamba	INC(I)	12,709	17.18	29,763
Guntur	102	Mangalagiri	Koteswara Rao	TDP	27,561	37.75	Rayapati Sreenivas	INC(I)	24,267	33.24	3,294
Guntur	103	Tadikonda (SC)	J. R. Pushparaj	TDP	42,987	60.61	Tamanapalli Amrutha Rao	INC(I)	16,501	23.27	26,486
Guntur	104	Sattenapalli	Nannapaneni Rajakumari	TDP	46,815	54.89	Chebrolu Hanumayya	INC(I)	27,147	31.83	19,668
Guntur	105	Peddakurapadu	Allamsetti Viseswara Rao	TDP	50,700	60.39	Ganapa Ramaswamy Reddy	INC(I)	29,682	35.35	21,018
Guntur	106	Gurzala	Julakanti Nagireddy	TDP	39,742	53.08	Kasu Venkata Krishna Reddy	INC(I)	27,020	36.09	12,722
Guntur	107	Macherla	Korrapati Subbarao	TDP	45,206	65.49	Challa Narapareddi	INC(I)	19,040	27.58	26,166
Guntur	108	Vinukonda	Gangineni Venkateswara Rao	IND	25,754	32.79	Avudari Venkateswarlu	INC(I)	25,339	32.26	415
Guntur	109	Narasaraopet	Kodela Siva Prasada Rao	TDP	55,100	55.86	Buchipudi Subbareddi	INC(I)	40,543	41.10	14,557
Guntur	110	Chilakaluripet	Krishna Murthy Kaza	TDP	56,812	63.86	Somepalli Sambaiah	INC(I)	32,146	36.14	24,666
Prakasam	111	Chirala	Chimataq Sambu	TDP	50,205	60.33	Bandla Bala Venkateswarlu	INC(I)	16,518	19.85	33,687
Prakasam	112	Parchur	Daggubati Venkateswara Rao	TDP	41,537	53.29	Gade Venkata Reddy	INC(I)	34,923	44.81	6,614
Prakasam	113	Martur	Gottipati Hanumantha Rao	TDP	41,846	54.91	Kandimalla Subbarao	INC(I)	33,352	43.76	8,494
Prakasam	114	Addanki	Chenchu Garataiah Bachina	TDP	41,068	50.36	Karanam Balaram Krishna Murthy	INC(I)	37,674	46.20	3,394
Prakasam	115	Ongole	Ponugupati Koteswara Rao	TDP	50,394	56.92	Thatiparthi Subba Reddy	INC(I)	20,546	23.21	29,848
Prakasam	116	Santhanuthalapadu (SC)	Aareti Kotaiah	TDP	52,139	63.54	Vema Yellaiah	INC(I)	18,280	22.28	33,859
Prakasam	117	Kandukur	Manugunta Adinarayana Reddy	IND	29,134	37.29	Gutta Venkatasubbaiah	INC(I)	26,293	33.65	2,841
Prakasam	118	Kanigiri	Mukku Kasi Reddy	TDP	35,380	48.25	Budulapalle Ramasubba Reddy	INC(I)	27,588	37.62	7,792
Prakasam	119	Kondepi	Moorubhooyina Malakondaiah	TDP	26,983	37.82	Gundapneni Pattabhi Ramaswami Chowdari	INC(I)	23,507	32.95	3,476
Prakasam	120	Cumbum	Kandula Nagarjuna Reddy	INC(I)	35,660	50.33	Vudumula Venkata Reddy	TDP	33,082	46.69	2,578
Prakasam	121	Darsi	Katuri Narayana Swamy	TDP	43,730	59.72	Dirisala Raja Gopala Reddy	INC(I)	27,272	37.24	16,458
Prakasam	122	Markapur	V. V. Narayana Reddy	TDP	40,302	55.71	Dodda Chalama Reddy	INC(I)	20,949	28.96	19,353
Prakasam	123	Giddalur	Mudiyam Pirareddy	IND	32,853	52.23	Pidathala Ranga Reddy	INC(I)	30,049	47.77	2,804
Nellore	124	Udayagiri	Venkaiah Naidu	BJP	42,694	59.53	Mekapati Rajamohan Reddy	INC(I)	22,194	30.95	20,500
Nellore	125	Kavali	Patallapalli Vengal Rao	TDP	42,916	55.11	Kaliki Yanadi Reddy	INC(I)	32,744	42.05	10,172
Nellore	126	Allur	Bezawada Papireddy	TDP	39,578	60.29	Rebala Dasaratha Ramireddy	INC(I)	23,987	36.54	15,591
Nellore	127	Kovur	Srinivasulu Reddy Nallapareddy	TDP	36,455	51.50	Jakka Venka Reddy	CPI(M)	16,934	23.92	19,521
Nellore	128	Atmakur (Nellore)	Anam Venkata Reddy	TDP	44,287	56.31	Bommireddy Sundara Rami Reddy B.	INC(I)	30,038	38.20	14,249
Nellore	129	Rapur	Malireddy Adinarayana Reddy	TDP	39,996	53.01	Nuvvula Venkataratnam Naidu	INC(I)	35,457	46.99	4,539
Nellore	130	Nellore	Anam Ramanarayana Reddy	TDP	51,613	60.71	Kunam Venkata Subba Reddy	INC(I)	22,068	25.96	29,545
Nellore	131	Sarvepalli	Pechala Reddy Chenna Reddy	TDP	42,918	55.44	Chiittoor Venkata Sesha Reddy	INC(I)	27,641	35.70	15,277
Nellore	132	Gudur (SC)	Jogi Masthanaiah	TDP	53,121	61.53	Patra Prakasa Rao	INC(I)	33,209	38.47	19,912
Nellore	133	Sulurpet (SC)	Satti Prakasham	TDP	41,711	61.69	Mylari Lakshmikanthamma	INC(I)	23,630	34.95	18,081
Nellore	134	Venkatagiri	Nallareddi Chandrasekhara Reddy	TDP	40,895	50.83	N. Janardhana Reddy	INC(I)	37,282	46.34	3,613
Chittoor	135	Srikalahasti	Adduru Dasaradharami Reddy	TDP	41,011	47.92	Tatiparthi Chenchu Reddy	INC(I)	22,790	26.63	18,221
Chittoor	136	Satyavedu (SC)	Talari Manohar	TDP	42,758	56.75	C. Das	INC(I)	29,693	39.41	13,065
Chittoor	137	Nagari	E. V. Gopal Raju (Elavarti)	TDP;	53,778	56.37	Reddivari Chengareddi	INC(I)	41,626	43.63	12,152
Chittoor	138	Puttur	Gali Muddukrishnama Naidu	TDP	53,830	67.10	K. Jayachandra Naidu	INC(I)	21,525	26.83	32,305
Chittoor	139	Vepanjeri (SC)	Talari Rudraiah	TDP	50,546	62.29	Bangala Arumugan	INC(I)	29,955	36.92	20,591
Chittoor	140	Chittoor	Jhansi Laxmi	TDP	49,127	58.85	N. P. Venkateswara Chowdery	INC(I)	32,693	39.17	16,434
Chittoor	141	Palmaner (SC)	Anjineyulu	TDP	50,791	67.51	A. Rathnam	INC(I)	22,831	30.35	27,960
Chittoor	142	Kuppam	N. Rangaswami Naidu	TDP	38,543	60.02	B. R. Doraswami Naidu	INC(I)	24,550	38.23	13,993
Chittoor	143	Punganur	Baggidi Gopal	TDP	41,043	51.94	K. V. Pathi	INC(I)	22,961	29.06	18,082
Chittoor	144	Madanpalle	Ratahanda Narayana Reddy	TDP	35,187	55.84	Kadapa Sudhakara Reddy	INC(I)	24,526	38.92	10,661
Chittoor	145	Thamballapalle	T. N. Srinivasa Reddy	IND	24,179	37.14	Avula Mohana Reddy	INC(I)	20,111	30.89	4,068
Chittoor	146	Vayalpad	Chinthala Surendra Reddy	TDP	42,249	54.10	Nallari Amarnatha Reddy	INC(I)	35,277	45.17	6,972
Chittoor	147	Pileru	Challa Prabhakara Reddy	TDP	50,651	66.94	Mogul Syfullah Baig	INC(I)	25,016	33.06	25,635
Chittoor	148	Chandragiri	Medasani Venkatarama Naidu	TDP	50,010	59.49	N. Chandrababu Naidu	INC(I)	32,581	38.76	17,429
Chittoor	149	Tirupathi	N. T. Rama Rao	TDP	64,688	77.01	Agarala Eswarareddy	INC(I)	17,809	21.20	46,879
Kadapa	150	Kodur (SC)	Settipalli Srinivasulu	TDP	45,889	63.98	Gunti Sriramulu	INC(I)	21,650	30.19	24,239
Kadapa	151	Rajampet	Konduru Prabhavatamma	INC(I)	41,466	49.02	Bandaru Rathanasabhathi	TDP	40,963	48.43	503
Kadapa	152	Rayachoti	Sugavasi Palakondarayudu	IND	47,899	56.79	Shavarunnisa	INC(I)	31,846	37.76	16,053
Kadapa	153	Lakkireddipalli	Rajagopal Reddy	TDP	49,561	64.88	Gadikota Rama Subbareddy	INC(I)	26,447	34.62	23,114
Kadapa	154	Cuddapa	S. Ramamuni Reddy	TDP	54,402	59.26	Gajjela Ranga Reddy	INC(I)	17,727	19.31	36,675
Kadapa	155	Badvel	B. Veera Reddy	INC(J)	43,140	51.44	Vaddamani Sivarama Krishna Rao	INC(I)	38,534	45.95	4,606
Kadapa	156	Mydukur	D. L. Ravindra Reddy	INC(I)	42,185	52.85	Palagiri Narayanareddi	TDP	37,118	46.51	5,067
Kadapa	157	Proddatur	Mallela Ramana Reddy	TDP	56,970	56.71	Nandyala Varada Rajulu Reddy	IND	34,418	34.26	22,552
Kadapa	158	Jammalamadugu	Ponnapureddy Siva Reddy	TDP	51,132	60.27	Tatireddy Narasimha Reddy	INC(I)	33,238	39.18	17,894
Kadapa	159	Kamalapuram	Vaddamani Venkata Reddy	TDP	41,218	52.76	Mule Venkata Mysura Reddy	INC(I)	35,123	44.96	6,095
Kadapa	160	Pulivendla	Y. S. Rajasekhar Reddy	INC(I)	47,256	57.68	Yeddula Bali Reddy	TDP	33,889	41.37	13,367
Anantapur	161	Kadiri	Mohammed Shakir	TDP	42,545	62.94	Nizamvali	INC(I)	21,088	31.20	21,457
Anantapur	162	Nallamada	K. Ramachandra Reddy	TDP	42,098	60.86	Agisam Veerappa	INC(I)	24,540	36.68	16,730
Anantapur	163	Gorantla	Veluri Kesanna	TDP	45,280	65.79	P. Divakara Reddy	INC(I)	23,540	34.21	21,740
Anantapur	164	Hindupur	P. Ranganayakulu	TDP	52,108	67.36	K. Thippe Swami	INC(I)	25,253	32.64	26,855
Anantapur	165	Madakasira	Y. C. Thimma Reddy	INC(I)	30,999	44.39	H. B. Narase Gowdu	TDP	25,395	36.37	5,604
Anantapur	166	Penukonda	S. Ramachandra Reddy	TDP	34,731	47.08	Gangula Narayana Reddy	INC(I)	19,843	26.90	14,888
Anantapur	167	Kalyandrug (SC)	T. C. Mareppa	TDP	41,768	59.22	Vishwanatham	INC(I)	19,989	28.34	21,779
Anantapur	168	Rayadrug	P. Venngopal Reddy	IND	26,203	36.59	Kata Govindappa	TDP	22,822	31.87	3,381
Anantapur	169	Uravakonda	Y. Bheema Reddy	TDP	41,826	60.99	Rayala Vemanna	INC(I)	26,748	39.01	15,078
Anantapur	170	Gooty	Pathi Rajagopalu	TDP	40,358	66.22	K. Venkataramaiah	INC(I)	13,806	22.65	26,552
Anantapur	171	Singanamala (SC)	P. Gurumurthy	TDP	38,221	65.53	K. Ananda Rao	INC(I)	19,318	33.12	18,903
Anantapur	172	Anantapur	D. Narayanaswamy	TDP	57,255	72.48	B. T. L. N. Chowdary	INC(I)	17,791	22.52	39,464
Anantapur	173	Dhamavaram	G. Nagi Reddy	TDP	54,752	69.40	P. V. Chowdari	INC(I)	24,147	30.60	30,605
Anantapur	174	Tadpatri	Mutyala Kesava Reddy	TDP	31,416	40.25	J. C. Diwakar Reddy	IND	20,300	26.01	11,116
Kurnool	175	Alur (SC)	K. Basappa	TDP	23,213	48.89	Eranna	INC(I)	22,482	47.35	731
Kurnool	176	Adoni	N. Prakash Jain	TDP	36,359	52.08	H. Satyanarayana	INC(I)	17,504	25.07	18,855
Kurnool	177	Yemmiganur	Kotla Vijaya Bhaskara Reddy	INC(I)	40,928	56.72	Abdul Razak	TDP	29,392	40.73	11,536
Kurnool	178	Kodumur (SC)	Muniswamy	INC(I)	36,369	54.32	M. Sikhamani	TDP	30,579	45.68	5,790
Kurnool	179	Kurnool	V. Rambhupal Chowdary	TDP	45,964	54.93	Dawood Khan	INC(I)	28,036	33.51	17,928
Kurnool	180	Pattikonda	M. Thamma Reddy	INC(I)	30,508	51.83	K. Mahabaleswara Gupta	TDP	28,358	48.17	2,150
Kurnool	181	Dhone	K. E. Krishna Murthy	INC(I)	34,536	54.46	Segu Venkata Ramaniah Setty	TDP	28,876	45.54	5,660
Kurnool	182	Koilkuntla	B. Narasimha Reddy	TDP	45,825	59.47	Bahula Venkata Nagi Reddi	INC(I)	30,028	38.97	15,797
Kurnool	183	Allagadda	S. V. Subba Reddy	TDP	49,208	57.28	Gangula Prathapa Reddy	INC(I)	35,474	41.30	13,734
Kurnool	184	Panyam	Challa Ramakrishna Reddy	TDP	34,873	51.42	Munagala Bala Rami Reddy	INC(I)	29,168	43.01	5,705
Kurnool	185	Nandikotkur	Byreddy Seshasayana Reddy	IND	36,533	43.51	Ippala Thimmareddy	TDP	32,049	38.17	4,484
Kurnool	186	Nandyal	Sanjeeva Reddy	TDP	51,608	63.05	Bojja Venkata Reddy	INC(I)	28,367	34.66	23,241
Kurnool	187	Atmakur (Kurnool)	Vengala Reddy (Budda)	TDP	41,897	57.36	B. Jangam Reddy	INC(I)	26,125	35.76	15,772
Mahabubnagar	188	Achampet (SC)	Puttapaga Mahendranath	TDP	36,660	55.70	Jayanthi	INC(I)	26,344	40.03	10,316
Mahabubnagar	189	Nagarkurnool	V. N. Goud	INC(I)	22,342	32.26	Nagam Janardhan Reddy	TDP	22,290	32.19	52
Mahabubnagar	190	Kalwakurthy	Jaipal Reddy	JP	46,045	57.49	Rukma Reddy	INC(I)	28,584	35.69	17,461
Mahabubnagar	191	Shadnagar (SC)	P. Shankar Rao	INC(I)	32,919	50.16	Puttapaga Radhakrishna	TDP	29,916	45.58	3,003
Mahabubnagar	192	Jadcherla	Krishna Reddy	TDP	31,803	51.73	N. Narasappa	INC(I)	25,985	42.27	5,818
Mahabubnagar	193	Mahbubnagar	P. Chandra Shekar	TDP	28,202	43.79	M. A. Shukoor	INC(I)	19,965	31.00	8,237
Mahabubnagar	194	Wanaparthy	Balakrishnaiah	TDP	31,100	42.39	M. Jayaramulu	INC(I)	27,110	36.95	3,990
Mahabubnagar	195	Kollapur	Kotha Venkateswar Rao	INC(I)	39,241	46.67	Vangur Krishna Reddy	TDP	26,533	31.56	12,708
Mahabubnagar	196	Alampur	Rajini Babu	TDP	35,979	49.46	T. Laxmi Sarojini Devi	INC(I)	25,709	45.38	2,968
Mahabubnagar	197	Gadwal	D. K. Samarasimha Reddy	INC(I)	36,326	50.02	Paga Pulla Reddy	TDP	31,753	43.73	4,573
Mahabubnagar	198	Amarchinta	Ismailu Mohammad	TDP	41,238	53.91	Veera Reddy	INC(I)	29,582	38.67	11,656
Mahabubnagar	199	Makthal	G. Narasimhulu Naidu	INC(I)	27,854	44.26	Yelkoti Yella Reddy	JP	21,614	34.35	6,240
Mahabubnagar	200	Kodangal	Gurunath Reddy	INC(I)	33,820	48.84	Nandaram Venkataiah	TDP	30,456	43.98	3,364
Ranga Reddy	201	Tandur	M. Manik Rao	INC(I)	37,572	57.11	Sirgirpet Sai Reddy	TDP	19,251	29.26	18,321
Ranga Reddy	202	Vicarabad (SC)	K. R. Krishna Swamy	INC(I)	22,261	38.03	Devadas	TDP	17,257	29.48	5,004
Ranga Reddy	203	Pargi	Ahmed Shareef	INC(I)	25,751	38.23	Koppala Harishwara Reddy	TDP	25,695	38.14	56
Ranga Reddy	204	Chevella	Konda Lakshma Reddy	INC(I)	30,402	40.25	P. Indra Reddy	LKD	29,281	38.77	1,121
Ranga Reddy	205	Ibrahimpatnam (SC)	A. G. Krishna	INC(I)	33,465	48.30	K. Satyanarayana	TDP	20,411	29.46	13,054
Hyderabad	206	Musheerabad	S. Rajeswar	TDP	19,609	27.56	Nayani Narasimha Reddy	JP	19,302	27.13	307
Hyderabad	207	Himayatnagar	G. Narayana Rao (Goud)	TDP	17,861	30.58	B. Damodar	BJP	14,975	25.64	2,886
Hyderabad	208	Sanathnagar	Katragadda Prasuna	TDP	32,638	48.52	S. Ramdass	INC(I)	19,470	28.95	13,168
Hyderabad	209	Secunderabad	M. Krishna Rao	TDP	33,069	48.09	K. Keshava Rao	INC(I)	15,128	22.00	17,941
Hyderabad	210	Khairatabad	N. Ramchander Rao	TDP	36,188	41.57	P. Janardhana Reddy	INC(I)	23,476	26.97	12,712
Hyderabad	211	Secunderabad Cantt. (SC)	N. A. Krishna	TDP	25,847	43.79	B. Machinder Rao	INC(I)	16,808	28.47	9,039
Hyderabad	212	Malakpet	N. Indrasena Reddy	BJP	21,937	27.00	Kandala Prabhakar Reddy	INC(I)	19,340	23.80	2,597
Hyderabad	213	Asifnagar	Afzal Shareef	IND	28,948	45.99	B. Krishna	INC(I)	14,521	23.07	14,427
Hyderabad	214	Maharajgunj	P. Rama Swamy	TDP	17,835	36.71	Shiv Pershad	INC(I)	14,303	29.44	3,532
Hyderabad	215	Karwan	Baqer Agha	IND	32,380	45.58	Nand Kishore	BJP	22,767	32.05	9,613
Hyderabad	216	Yakutpura	Khaja Abu Sayeed	IND	46,127	74.24	Syed Sarfaraz Ali	TDP	6,491	10.45	39,636
Hyderabad	217	Chandrayangutta	Md. Amanullah Khan	IND	43,822	48.10	Ale Narendra	BJP	40,241	44.25	3,581
Hyderabad	218	Charminar	Sultan Salahuddin Owaisi	IND	50,724	64.05	C. Ashok Kumar	BJP	18,218	23.01	32,506
Ranga Reddy	219	Medchal	Uma Venkatarama Reddy	INC(I)	34,853	36.24	Thummalapally Pratap Reddy	TDP	34,789	36.17	64
Medak	220	Siddipet	Ananthula Madan Mohan	INC(I)	28,766	40.33	K. Chandra Shakher Rao	TDP	27,889	39.10	877
Medak	221	Dommat	Aireni Lingaiah	INC(I)	22,307	34.01	Demmata Ramachandra Reddy	TDP	21,938	33.45	369
Medak	222	Gajwel (SC)	Allam Sailu	TDP	36,544	51.34	Gajwel Saidaiah	INC(I)	32,583	45.78	3,961
Medak	223	Narsapur	C. Jagannath Rao	INC(I)	40,774	53.92	Chilumula Vittal Reddy	CPI	32,536	43.02	8,238
Medak	224	Sangareddy	P. Ramachandra Reddy	IND	37,454	41.41	Patlolla Veera Reddy	INC(I)	31,785	35.14	5,669
Medak	225	Zahirabad	Mogaligundla Baga Reddy	INC(I)	34,861	48.87	Tirumala Lakshma Reddy	TDP	24,964	34.99	9,897
Medak	226	Narayankhed	M. Venkata Reddy	TDP	41,319	51.84	Shivrao Shettkar	INC(I)	38,379	48.16	2,940
Medak	227	Medak	Karanam Ramachandra Rao	TDP	30,950	44.99	Seri Lakshma Reddy	INC(I)	29,386	42.71	1,564
Medak	228	Ramayampet	T. Anjaiah	INC(I)	35,235	50.68	Ramannagari Srinivasa Reddy	BJP	18,402	26.4%	16,833
Medak	229	Andole (SC)	Hadkar Laxmanjee	INC(I)	29,630	49.76	J. Eshwari Bai	TDP	19,115	32.10	10,515
Nizamabad	230	Balkonda	G. Madhusudhan Reddy	TDP	40,513	63.43	Gaddam Susheela Bai	INC(I)	12,984	20.33	27,529
Nizamabad	231	Armur	Sanigaram Santosh Reddy	INC(I)	34,053	51.31	Aleti Mahipal Reddy	TDP	28,497	42.94	5,556
Nizamabad	232	Kamareddy	Parsi Gangaiah	TDP	37,021	54.25	B. Balaiah	INC(I)	22,656	33.20	14,365
Nizamabad	233	Yellareddy	Kishan Reddy	TDP	37,923	54.82	Tanduri Bala Goud	INC(I)	30,197	43.65	7,726
Nizamabad	234	Jukkal (SC)	S. Gangaram	INC(I)	30,994	57.02	Begari Pandari	TDP	19,102	35.14	11,892
Nizamabad	235	Banswada	Kishan Singh	TDP	36,346	49.80	M. Srinivasa Rao	INC(I)	24,459	33.51	11,887
Nizamabad	236	Bodhan	D. Sambasiva Rao	TDP	20,257	31.77	M. Narayan Reddy	IND	18,618	29.20	1,639
Nizamabad	237	Nizamabad	D. Satyanarayana	TDP	32,653	46.67	Srinivas	INC(I)	19,708	28.17	12,945
Nizamabad	238	Dichpalli	Mandava M. J. Thomas Chowdary	TDP	29,687	47.10	Ananthareddy Bala Reddy	INC(I)	25,877	41.06	3,810
Adilabad	239	Mudhole	G. Gaddenna	INC(I)	37,679	54.39	Armoor Hanmanth Reddy	TDP	23,835	34.41	13,844
Adilabad	240	Nirmal	Aindla Bheema Reddy	TDP	39,364	57.92	P. Ganga Reddy	INC(I)	23,215	34.16	16,149
Adilabad	241	Boath (ST)	Kasiram Marsakota	INC(I)	22,578	45.14	Vannela Ganga Reddy	CPI	13,243	26.48	9,335
Adilabad	242	Adilabad	Chilkuri Vaman Reddy	IND	26,871	42.01	Chilkuri Ramachander Reddy	INC(I)	26,362	41.22	509
Adilabad	243	Khanapur (ST)	Ambajee	INC(I)	17,269	37.02	A. Govind Naik	TDP	16,008	34.31	1,261
Adilabad	244	Asifabad (SC)	Gunda Mallesh	CPI	17,623	33.94	Dasari Narsaiah	INC(I)	17320	33.36	303
Adilabad	245	Luxettipet	Madavarapu Murali Manohar Rao	TDP	28,976	37.85	G. V. Sudhakara Rao	IND	28,571	37.32	405
Adilabad	246	Sirpur	K. V. Narayana Rao	TDP	28,623	52.32	K. V. Keshavulu	INC(I)	17,966	32.84	10,657
Adilabad	247	Chennur (SC)	Sothuku Sanjeev Rao	TDP	28,631	45.75	K. Devaki Devi	INC(I)	22,515	35.98	6,116
Karimnagar	248	Manthani	D. Sripada Rao	INC(I)	28,470	46.38	Chandupatla Raji Reddy	TDP	27,107	44.16	1,363
Karimnagar	249	Peddapalle	Gone Prakash Rao	TDP	24,928	40.42	Geetla Mukunda Reddy	INC(I)	18,501	30.00	6,427
Karimnagar	250	Mydaram (SC)	Mathangi Narsaiah	TDP	34,411	46.88	G. Eashwar	INC(I)	19,803	26.98	14,608
Karimnagar	251	Huzurabad	Kotha Raji Reddy	TDP	24,785	34.99	Duggirala Venkat Rao	IND	20,602	29.09	4,183
Karimnagar	252	Kamalapur	Madadi Ramachandra Reddy	INC(I)	30,179	42.37	Janardhan Reddy	LKD	23,955	33.64	6,224
Karimnagar	253	Indurthi	Bopparaju Lakshmikanth Rao	INC(I)	23,453	36.27	Devi Shetti Sreenivasa Rao	TDP	20,185	31.21	3,268
Karimnagar	254	Karimnagar	K. Murtunjayam	TDP	38,274	57.19	Nalamachu Kondaiah	INC(I)	17,764	26.54	20,510
Karimnagar	255	Choppadandi	Gurram Madhava Reddy	TDP	36,133	59.78	Arugu Narayana Reddy	INC(I)	18,651	30.85	17,482
Karimnagar	256	Jagtial	T. Jeevan Reddy	TDP	35,699	57.05	Juvvadi Rathnaker Rao	INC(I)	23,337	37.29	12,362
Karimnagar	257	Buggaram	Kadakuntla Gangaram	INC(I)	19,515	36.04	Shikari Vishwanath	TDP	17,596	32.49	1,919
Karimnagar	258	Metpalli	Vardineni Venkateswar Rao	INC(I)	21,371	37.03	Miryala Kishan Rao	TDP	13,990	24.24	7,381
Karimnagar	259	Sircilla	Vachidi Mohan Reddy	TDP	27,508	40.02	Regulapati Papa Rao	INC(I)	19,809	28.82	7,699
Karimnagar	260	Narella (SC)	Pati Rajan	INC(I)	26,787	44.07	Gotte Bhoopathi	TDP	22,569	37.13	4,218
Warangal	261	Cheriyal	Nimma Raja Reddy	TDP	27,974	47.03	Gorla Shiddaiah	INC(I)	20,155	33.88	7,819
Warangal	262	Jangaon	Rondla Laxma Reddy	TDP	28,845	44.09	Kodoor Varda Reddy	INC(I)	18,936	28.94	9,909
Warangal	263	Chennur	Nemarugommula Yethi Raja Rao	INC(I)	29,442	40.53	Kundur Madhusudhan Reddy	TDP	22,069	30.38	7,373
Warangal	264	Dornakal	Surendra Reddy	INC(I)	51,038	75.24	Jannareddy Jitender Reddy	TDP	16,794	24.76	34,244
Warangal	265	Mahbubabad	Jannareddy Janardhan Reddy	INC(I)	35,728	51.15	Gandu Ailaiah	TDP	22,187	31.76	13,541
Warangal	266	Narsampet	Maddikayala Omkar	CPI(M)	36,876	48.17	Kattiah Pindam	INC(I)	33,301	43.50	3,575
Warangal	267	Waradhanapet	Macherla Jagannadham	INC(I)	27,232	39.37	Vannala Sreeramulu	BJP	20,960	30.30	6,272
Warangal	268	Ghanpur Station (SC)	Goka Ramaswamy	INC(I)	23,970	41.57	Pulla Sudarshana Rao	TDP	23,196	40.22	774
Warangal	269	Warangal	Bandaru Nagabhushan Rao	TDP	24,980	39.42	Bhupathi Krishna Moorthy	BJP	16,144	25.47	8,836
Warangal	270	Hanamkonda	Sangamreddy Satyanarayana	TDP	39,112	58.88	Tiruvarangam Haygrivachary	INC(I)	21,415	32.2%	17,697
Warangal	271	Shyampet	Chandupatla Janga Reddy	BJP	30,605	48.07	Pingili Dharma Reddy	INC(I)	25,941	40.74	4,664
Warangal	272	Parkal (SC)	Bochu Sammaiah	INC(I)	26,140	40.30	V. Jayapal	BJP	18,845	29.05	7,295
Warangal	273	Mulug (ST)	Porika Jagan Naik	INC(I)	26,374	41.91	Azmeera Chandulal	TDP	24,656	39.18	1,718
Khammam	274	Bhadrachalam (ST)	Murla Yerraiah Reddy	CPI(M)	22,416	37.02	Yetti Aswapathi	TDP	19,671	32.49	2,745
Khammam	275	Burgampahad (ST)	Vooke Abbaiah	CPI	17,524	28.39	Chanda Lingaiah	TDP	15,803	25.60	1,721
Khammam	276	Kothagudem	Koneru Nageswara Rao	TDP	30,780	42.16	Chekuri Kasaiah	INC(I)	21,895	29.99	8,885
Khammam	277	Sathupalli	Jalagam Prasada Rao	INC(I)	42,494	52.19	Thummala Nageswara Rao	TDP	36,278	44.56	6,216
Khammam	278	Madhira	Seelam Sidda Reddy	INC(I)	38,338	45.52	Bodepudi Venkateswara Rao	CPI(M)	27,151	32.24	11,187
Khammam	279	Palair (SC)	Bheemapaka Bhupathi Rao	CPI	35,915	48.23	Sambhani Chandra Sekhar	INC(I)	27,626	37.10	8,289
Khammam	280	Khammam	Manchikanti Rama Kishan Rao	CPI(M)	37,771	43.19	Kisari Anantha Reddy	INC(I)	29,321	33.53	8,450
Khammam	281	Shujatnagar	Mohammad Rajab Ali	CPI	30,136	47.20	Md. Ismail	INC(I)	18,832	29.50	11,304
Khammam	282	Yellandu (ST)	Gummadi Narsaiah	IND	19,202	31.27	Banothu Somala Nayaku	INC(I)	16,736	27.25	2,466
Nalgonda	283	Thungathurthi	Mallu Swarajyam	CPI(M)	19,465	27.29	Vijaysena Reddy Rethi Reddy	INC(I)	17,568	24.63	1,897
Nalgonda	284	Suryapet (SC)	Eda Deviah	TDP	23,581	33.48	B. M. Raj	INC(I)	23,239	33.00	342
Nalgonda	285	Kodad	Veerapalli Laxminarayana Rao	TDP	28,760	35.13	Chintha Chandra Reddy	INC(I)	27,505	33.60	1,255
Nalgonda	286	Miryalguda	Chankilam Sreenivasa Rao	INC(I)	40,925	43.52	Aribandi Lakshmi Narayan	CPI(M)	34,036	36.20	6,889
Nalgonda	287	Chalakurthi	Kunduru Jana Reddy	TDP	39,676	54.04	Nimmala Ramula	INC(I)	33,746	45.96	5,930
Nalgonda	288	Nakrekal	Narra Raghava Reddy	CPI(M)	29,355	40.76	S. Indrasena Reddy	INC(I)	28,709	39.86	646
Nalgonda	289	Nalgonda	Gutha Mohan Reddy	IND	23,646	34.11	Gaddam Rudrama Devi	TDP	17,007	24.5%	6,639
Nalgonda	290	Ramannapet	Kommu Papaiah	INC(I)	23,617	32.90	Katukuru Suseela Devi	CPI	22,028	30.69	1,589
Nalgonda	291	Alair (SC)	Motkupalli Narasimhulu	TDP	26,589	39.27	Sallooru Poshiah	INC(I)	18,914	27.93	7,675
Nalgonda	292	Bhongir	Kommidi Narasimha Reddy	INC(I)	26,108	33.80	Meesala Bikashapathi	TDP	20,068	25.98	6,040
Nalgonda	293	Mungode	Palvai Govardhan Reddy	INC(I)	30,084	42.92	Bommagani Dharam Biksham	CPI	19,773	28.21	10,311
Nalgonda	294	Devarakonda (ST)	Dharavath Ravinder Naik	INC(I)	23,852	35.38	Kethavathu Harya	CPI	20,692	30.69	3,160

== Bypolls ==
=== By-election ===
District	Constituency		Winner				Runner Up				Margin
District	No.	Name	Candidate	Party	Votes	%	Candidate	Party	Votes	%	Margin
Hyderabad	207	Himayatnagar	Ale Narendra	BJP	47,139		P. Upendra	TDP	19,005		28,134
Hyderabad	207	Himayatnagar	Bypoll held on 27 February 1983 following the death of the incumbent member G. Narayana Rao (Goud) of Telugu Desam Party on 7 January 1983.								
Chittoor	149	Tirupati	Kathula Syamala	TDP	40,417		Reddivari Rajasekhara Reddy	INC(I)	29,495		10,922
Chittoor	149	Tirupati	Bypoll held on 27 February 1983 following the resignation of the incumbent member N. T. Rama Rao of Telugu Desam Party as MLA on 18 January 1983.								
Kurnool	177	Yemmiganur	B. V. Mohana Reddy	TDP	36,601		Hanumantha Reddy	INC(I)	29,962		6,639
Kurnool	177	Yemmiganur	Bypoll held on 27 February 1983 following the resignation of the incumbent member Kotla Vijaya Bhaskara Reddy of Indian National Congress (Indira) as MLA on 17 January 1983.								
West Godavari	67	Tadepalligudem	Eli Varalakshmi	TDP	45,587		Mylavarapu Raj Bhaskara Rao	INC(I)	15,459		30,128
West Godavari	67	Tadepalligudem	Bypoll held on 19 June 1983 following the death of the incumbent member Eli Anjaneulu of Telugu Desam Party on 28 March 1983.								
Prakasam	113	Martur	Daggubati Venkateswara Rao	TDP	49,399		Sadineni Chowdaraiah	INC(I)	44,847		4,552
Prakasam	113	Martur	Bypoll held on 13 November 1983 following the resignation of the incumbent member Gottipati Hanumantha Rao of Telugu Desam Party as MLA on 6 May 1983.								
Karimnagar	249	Peddapalle	Geetla Mukunda Reddy	INC(I)	23,175		Vemula Ramanaiah	TDP	19,921		3,254
Karimnagar	249	Peddapalle	Bypoll held on 13 November 1983 following the resignation of the incumbent member Gone Prakash Rao of Telugu Desam Party as MLA on 27 July 1983.								
Hyderabad	213	Asifnagar	Md. V. R. Khan	IND	34,584		G. N. Rao	TDP	32,885		1,699
Hyderabad	213	Asifnagar	Bypoll held in 1984 following the death of the incumbent member Afzal Shareef, an Independent on 25 November 1983.								
Krishna	89	Bandar	R. R. Vaddi	TDP	44,193		C. Veeraswamy	INC(I)	31,577		12,616
Krishna	89	Bandar	Bypoll held in 1984 following the death of the incumbent member Borra Venkataswami of Telugu Desam Party on 19 December 1983.								

=== Countermanded poll ===
District	Constituency		Winner				Runner Up				Margin
District	No.	Name	Candidate	Party	Votes	%	Candidate	Party	Votes	%	Margin
Chittoor	144	Madanapalle	Ratahanda Narayana Reddy	TDP	35,187	55.84	Kadapa Sudhakara Reddy	INC(I)	24,526	38.92	10,661
Chittoor	144	Madanapalle	Countermanded poll held on 27 February 1983 following the death of contesting candidate Sangaraju Nagaseshagiri Rao on 25 December 1982.								

== Aftermath ==
=== Government formation ===
The landslide victory of the TDP led by NTR ended the long rule of the Congress government in Andhra Pradesh, which had governed the state since its formation in 1956 for nearly twenty seven years. NTR was sworn in as the Chief Minister of Andhra Pradesh on 9 January 1983 at L. B. Stadium in Hyderabad. The cermony became a historic event, as it was the first time in India that a chief minister's swearing in-cermony was conducted on such a grand scale before a massive public gathering, instead of the traditional ceremony held at the Raj Bhavan, the Governor's official residence. The ceremony was attended by Akkineni Nageswara Rao. NTR formed his first cabinet with 14 ministers.

== See also ==
- Elections in Andhra Pradesh
- 1983 elections in India
- List of chief ministers of Andhra Pradesh
- Government of Andhra Pradesh
