= Mylavaram Assembly constituency =

Constituency of the Andhra Pradesh Legislative Assembly, India

Coordinates: 16.76°N 80.64°E

Mylavaram
- Constituency No. 82 for the Andhra Pradesh Legislative Assembly
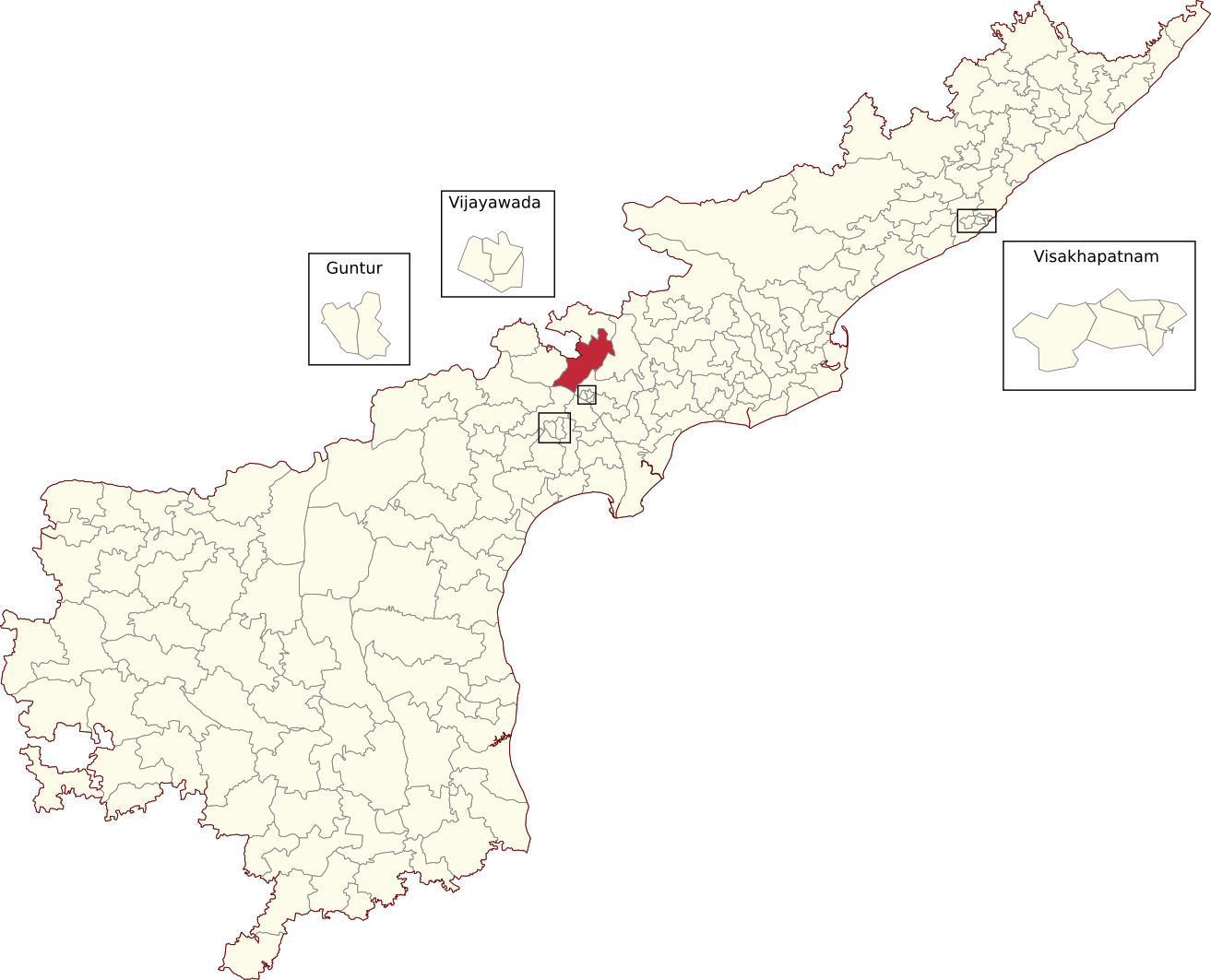
- Location of Mylavaram Assembly constituency within Andhra Pradesh

Constituency details
- Country: India
- Region: South India
- State: Andhra Pradesh
- District: NTR
- Lok Sabha constituency: Vijayawada
- Established: 1955
- Total electors: 276,459
- Reservation: None

Member of Legislative Assembly
- 16th Andhra Pradesh Legislative Assembly
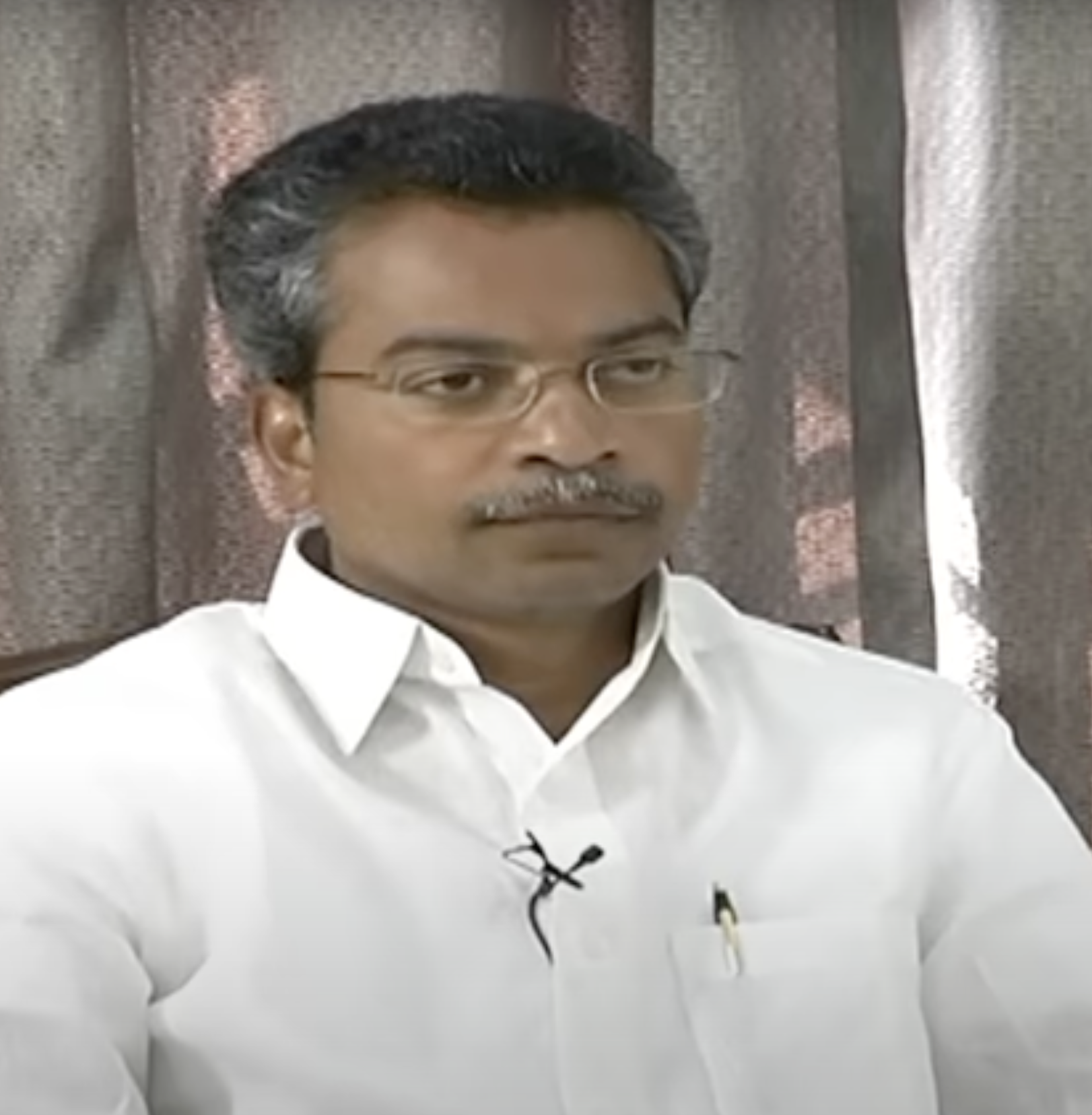
- Incumbent Vasantha Venkata Krishna Prasad
- Party: TDP
- Alliance: NDA
- Elected year: 2024

Mylavaram is a constituency in NTR district of Andhra Pradesh that elects representatives to the Andhra Pradesh Legislative Assembly in India. It is one of the seven assembly segments of Vijayawada Lok Sabha constituency.

Vasantha Venkata Krishna Prasad is the current MLA of the constituency, having won the 2024 Andhra Pradesh Legislative Assembly election from Telugu Desam Party. As of 2019, there are a total of 276,459 electors in the constituency. The constituency was established in 1955, as per the Delimitation Orders (1955).

== Mandal ==
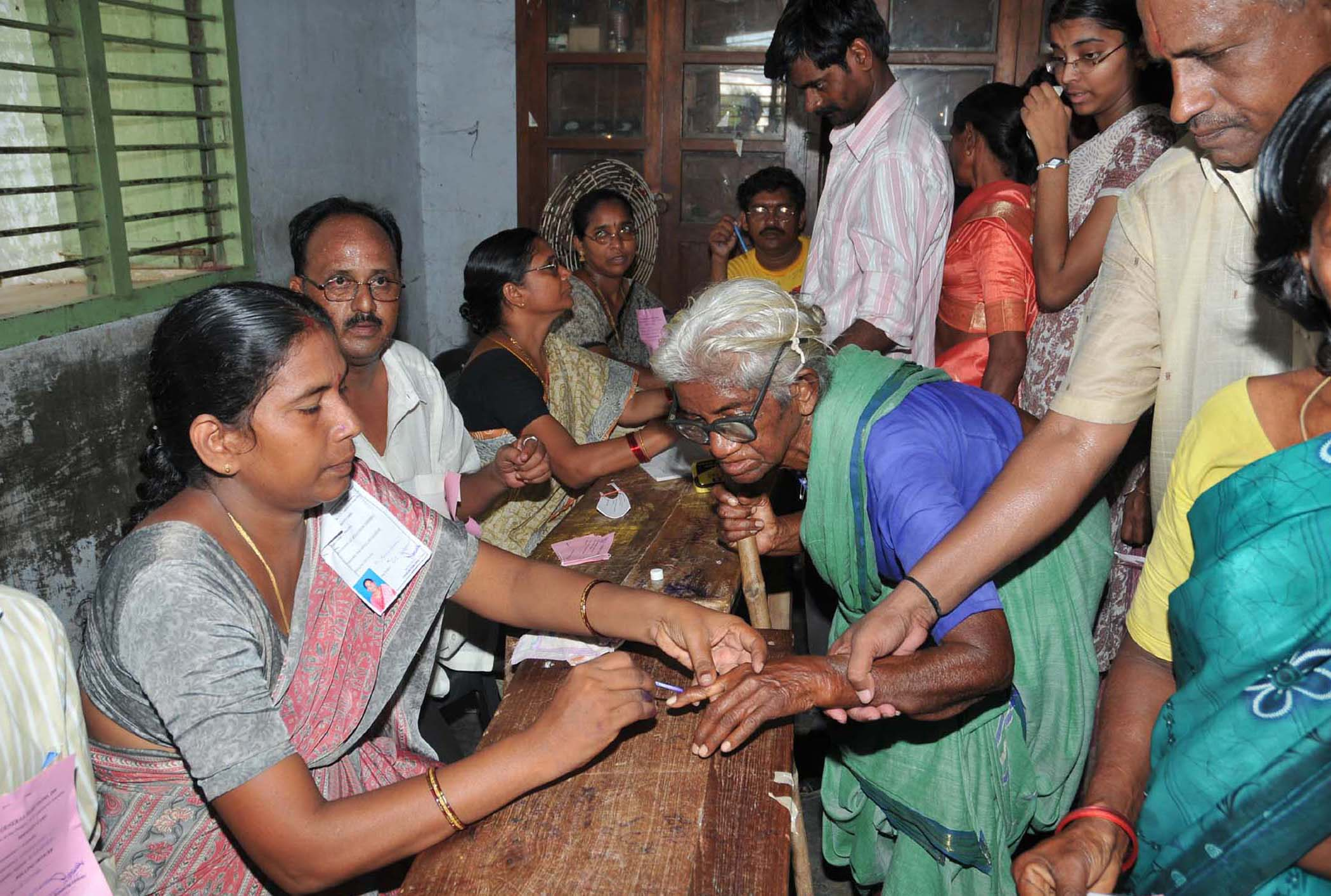
The Polling Officer administering indelible ink at the finger of a voter at a polling booth at Mylavaram during the 2nd Phase of General Election-2009 on April 23, 2009

There are five Mandals.

Mandals
Ibrahimpatnam mandal
G. Konduru mandal
Mylavaram mandal
Reddigudem mandal
Vijayawada (Rural) mandal (part)

== Members of the Legislative Assembly ==
Year	Member	Political party
1955	Vellanki Visweswara Rao	Communist Party of India
1962	Vellanki Visweswara Rao	Communist Party of India
1967	Chanamolu Venkata Rao	Indian National Congress
1972	Chanamolu Venkata Rao	Indian National Congress
1978	Chanamolu Venkata Rao	Indian National Congress
1983	Nimmagadda Satyanarayana	Telugu Desam Party
1985	Chanamolu Venkata Rao	Indian National Congress
1989	Komati Bhaskara Rao	Indian National Congress
1994	Jyestha Ramesh Babu	Telugu Desam Party
1999	Vadde Sobhanadreeswara Rao	Telugu Desam Party
2004	Chanamolu Venkata Rao	Indian National Congress
2009	Devineni Uma Maheswara Rao	Telugu Desam Party
2014	Devineni Uma Maheswara Rao	Telugu Desam Party
2019	Vasantha Venkata Krishna Prasad	YSR Congress Party
2024	Vasantha Venkata Krishna Prasad	Telugu Desam Party

== Election results ==
=== 1955 ===
1955 Andhra Pradesh Legislative Assembly election: Mylavaram
Party	Candidate	Votes	%	±%
CPI	Vellanki Visweswara Rao	20,324	50.10%	
INC	Pedarla Venkata Subbaiah	20,240	49.90%	
Margin of victory		84	0.21%	
Turnout		40,564	77.96%	
Registered electors		52,031		
CPI win (new seat)				

=== 1962 ===
1962 Andhra Pradesh Legislative Assembly election: Mylavaram
Party	Candidate	Votes	%	±%
CPI	Ganga China Kondaiah	23,666	48.26%	
INC	Pedarla Venkata Subbaiah	23,152	47.21%	
Margin of victory		514	1.05%	
Turnout		50,207	83.53%	
Registered electors		60,103		
CPI hold		Swing		

=== 1967 ===
1967 Andhra Pradesh Legislative Assembly election: Mylavaram
Party	Candidate	Votes	%	±%
INC	Chanamolu Venkata Rao	40,112	62.54%	
CPI	Vellanki Visweswara Rao	20,387	31.79%	
Margin of victory		19,725	30.76%	
Turnout		65,443	82.40%	
Registered electors		79,424		
INC gain from CPI		Swing		

=== 1972 ===
1972 Andhra Pradesh Legislative Assembly election: Mylavaram
Party	Candidate	Votes	%	±%
INC	Chanamolu Venkata Rao	41,901	63.26%	
Independent	D Madhusudhan Rao	18,876	28.50%	
Margin of victory		23,025	34.76%	
Turnout		67,876	76.74%	
Registered electors		88,447		
INC hold		Swing		

=== 1978 ===
1978 Andhra Pradesh Legislative Assembly election: Mylavaram
Party	Candidate	Votes	%	±%
INC	Chanamolu Venkata Rao	28,838	38.36%	
JP	Anandabai T E S	23,518	31.28%	
INC(I)	Kopparti John Sudarsanam	22,054	29.34%	
Margin of victory		5,320	7.08%	
Turnout		76,653	81.50%	
Registered electors		94,056		
INC hold		Swing		

=== 1983 ===
1983 Andhra Pradesh Legislative Assembly election: Mylavaram
Party	Candidate	Votes	%	±%
TDP	Nimmagadda Satyanarayana	40,089	48.73%	
INC	Chanamolu Venkata Rao	35,857	43.59%	
Margin of victory		4,232	5.14%	
Turnout		83,718	77.87%	
Registered electors		107,509		
TDP gain from INC		Swing		

=== 1985 ===
1985 Andhra Pradesh Legislative Assembly election: Mylavaram
Party	Candidate	Votes	%	±%
INC	Chanamolu Venkata Rao	51,432	54.37%	
TDP	Nimmagadda Satyanarayana	42,064	44.47%	
Margin of victory		9,368	9.90%	
Turnout		95,381	80.38%	
Registered electors		118,657		
INC gain from TDP		Swing		

=== 1989 ===
1989 Andhra Pradesh Legislative Assembly election: Mylavaram
Party	Candidate	Votes	%	±%
INC	Komati Bhaskara Rao	54,613	47.97%	
TDP	Jyetsha Ramesh Babu	53,480	46.98%	
Margin of victory		1,133	0.99%	
Turnout		117,049	78.41%	
Registered electors		149,287		
INC hold		Swing		

=== 1994 ===
1994 Andhra Pradesh Legislative Assembly election: Mylavaram
Party	Candidate	Votes	%	±%
TDP	Jyestha Ramesh Babu	64,716	50.50%	
INC	Chanamolu Venkata Rao	57,365	44.77%	
Margin of victory		7,351	5.74%	
Turnout		130,172	80.26%	
Registered electors		162,185		
TDP gain from INC		Swing		

=== 1999 ===
1999 Andhra Pradesh Legislative Assembly election: Mylavaram
Party	Candidate	Votes	%	±%
TDP	Vadde Sobhanadreeswara Rao	65,085	48.10%	
INC	Komati Sudhakara Rao	56,170	41.51%	
Margin of victory		8,915	6.59%	
Turnout		138,836	76.41%	
Registered electors		181,688		
TDP hold		Swing		

=== 2004 ===
2004 Andhra Pradesh Legislative Assembly election: Mylavaram
Party	Candidate	Votes	%	±%
INC	Chanamolu Venkata Rao	77,383	52.41	+10.90
TDP	Vadde Sobhanadreeswara Rao	63,966	43.32	−4.78
Majority		13,417	9.09	
Turnout		147,657	78.31	−3.93
Registered electors		188,556		
INC gain from TDP		Swing		

=== 2009 ===
2009 Andhra Pradesh Legislative Assembly election: Mylavaram
Party	Candidate	Votes	%	±%
TDP	Devineni Uma Maheswara Rao	78,554	45.70	+2.38
INC	Appasani Sandeep	65,887	38.33	−14.08
PRP	Lakshmi Anupama Chanamolu	19,516	11.35	
Majority		12,667	7.37	
Turnout		171,872	84.95	+6.64
Registered electors		202,319		
TDP gain from INC		Swing		

=== 2014 ===
2014 Andhra Pradesh Legislative Assembly election: Mylavaram
Party	Candidate	Votes	%	±%
TDP	Devineni Uma Maheswara Rao	94,539	47.00	
YSRCP	Jogi Ramesh	86,970	43.24	
Majority		7,569	3.76	
Turnout		201,155	85.96	+1.01
Registered electors		234,025		
TDP hold		Swing		

=== 2019 ===
2019 Andhra Pradesh Legislative Assembly election: Mylavaram
Party	Candidate	Votes	%	±%
YSRCP	Vasantha Venkata Krishna Prasad	114,940	49.44	
TDP	Devineni Uma Maheswara Rao	102,287	43.99	
JSP	Akkala Rammohan Alias Akkala Gandhi	8,716	3.74	
Majority		12,747	5.45	
Turnout		232,500	89.6	+4.21
Registered electors		280,536		
YSRCP gain from TDP		Swing		

=== 2024 ===
2024 Andhra Pradesh Legislative Assembly election: Mylavaram
Party	Candidate	Votes	%	±%
TDP	Vasantha Krishna Prasad	137,338	56.61	
YSRCP	Tirapathi Rao Sarnala	94,509	38.96	
INC	Kiran Borra	4,652	1.92	
NOTA	None of the above	1,598	0.66	
Majority		42,829	17.65	
Turnout		2,42,597		
TDP gain from YSRCP		Swing		

== See also ==
- List of constituencies of the Andhra Pradesh Legislative Assembly
