= Vasantha Krishna Prasad =

Indian politician and businessman

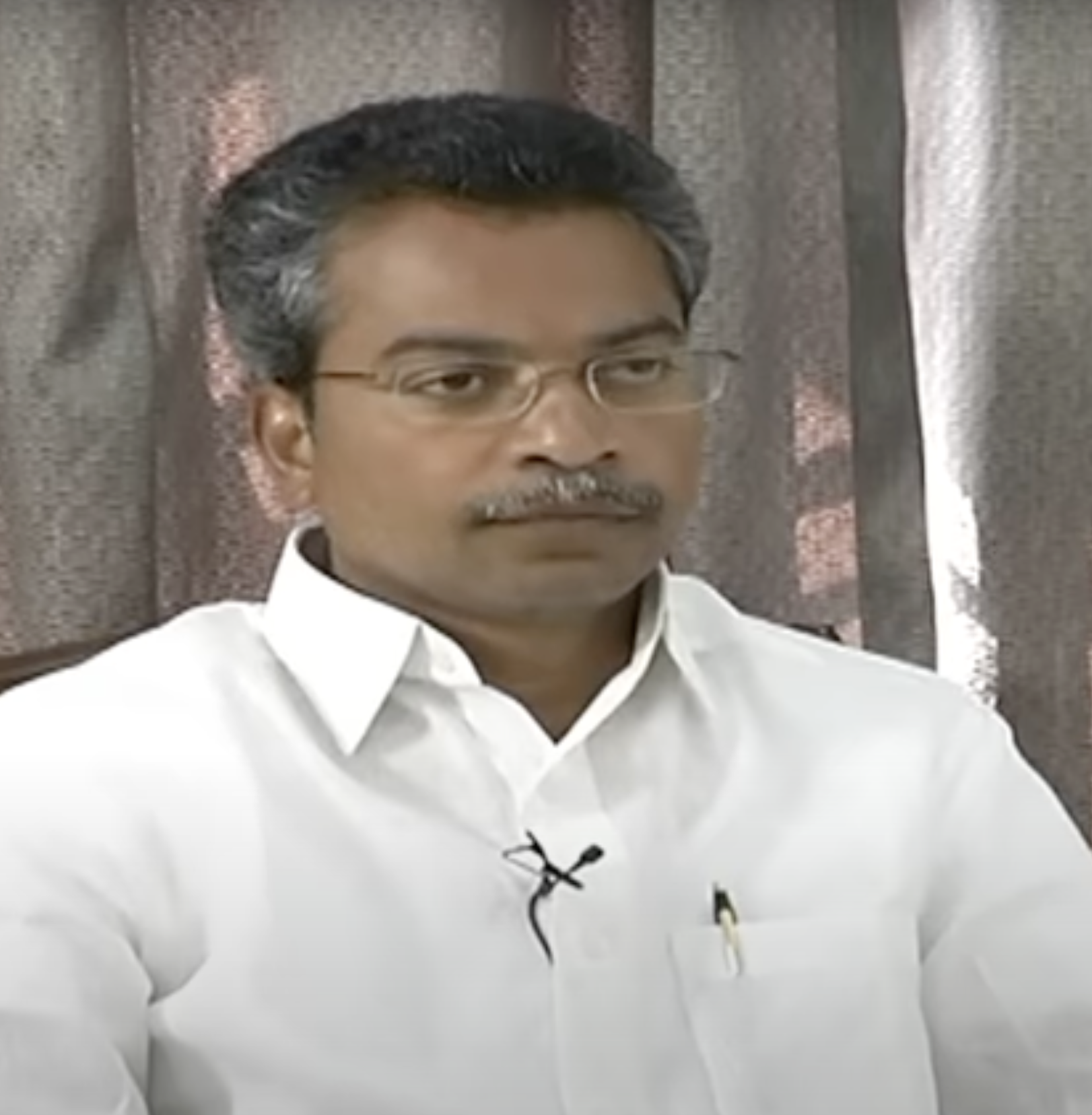
- Prasad in 2019

Member of the Andhra Pradesh Legislative Assembly
- Incumbent
- Assumed office 2019
- Preceded by: Devineni Uma Maheswara Rao
- Constituency: Mylavaram

Personal details
- Born: 9 April 1970 (age 56) Ithavaram, Krishna district, Andhra Pradesh, India
- Party: Telugu Desam Party (2024–present)
- Other political affiliations: Indian National Congress (1999–?); YSR Congress Party (2018–2024)
- Children: 3
- Occupation: Politician; Businessman

Vasantha Venkata Krishna Prasad (born 8 April 1970) is an Indian politician and businessman from the state of Andhra Pradesh. He contested the 2019 Andhra Pradesh Legislative Assembly election and won as the Member of the Legislative Assembly (MLA) representing the Mylavaram Assembly constituency on behalf of YSR Congress Party (YSRCP) and has been serving as the MLA since 2019. In 2024, he left the YSRCP and joined the Telugu Desam Party (TDP) and contested the 2024 Andhra Pradesh Legislative Assembly election representing Mylavaram constituency on behalf of the TDP. He had unsuccessfully contested from Nandigama Assembly constituency on behalf of Indian National Congress in 1999.

== Early life ==
Prasad was born to Nageswara Rao and Hymavathi. He hails from Ithavaram village of Nandigama mandal, Krishna district (now in NTR district). Prasad's father, Nageswara Rao, is a politician, former Home Minister and one of the proponents of the Jai Andhra movement. Prasad is married to Sirisha and has three children.

== Career ==
Prasad is a businessman – a realtor and an industrialist. He is a promoter of Vasantha Projects Ltd.

He contested the 1999 Andhra Pradesh Legislative Assembly election representing the Nandigama Assembly constituency on behalf of Indian National Congress but lost to Devineni Uma Maheswara Rao by a margin of more than 13,000 votes.

In 2014, he was named as one of the accused in the charge-sheet filed by the Central Bureau of Investigation (CBI) as part of the disproportionate assets probe against Y. S. Jagan Mohan Reddy, the YSRCP president. Prasad was included in the charge-sheet since he is the promoter of the firm Vasantha Projects which was allocated a housing project – which the CBI accused was a result of the firm's shareholder, who is a close relative of Reddy, influencing the government.

On 10 May 2018, he joined the YSRCP party. He worked as the party's in-charge for the Mylavaram constituency during 2019. He contested the 2019 Andhra Pradesh Legislative Assembly election on behalf of YSR Congress Party representing the Mylavaram Assembly constituency and won as the Member of the Legislative Assembly defeating the incumbent, and his principal opponent and a long-term political rival, Devineni Uma Maheswara Rao of the Telugu Desam Party. Prasad secured 114,940 votes representing 49.44% of the total votes polled and won by a margin of about 13,000 votes against Rao of TDP. Prasad declared assets valued at ₹111.89 crore (US$13 million) and stood as the richest candidate from the erstwhile Krishna district contesting the election.

After being denied the candidacy to the 2024 Andhra Pradesh Legislative Assembly election, Prasad announced on 5 February 2024 that he would leave the YSRCP. Subsequently, he joined the TDP on 2 March. He contested the 2024 Assembly election representing the Mylavaram constituency on behalf of the TDP. As part of the nomination, he declared movable assets valued at ₹81.18 crore (US$9.6 million) and immovable assets valued at ₹58.15 lakh (US$69,000).
