= Visakhapatnam-I Assembly constituency =

Defunct assembly constituency of Andhra Pradesh

Coordinates: 17.76°N 83.25°E

Visakhapatnam-I
- Former constituency for the Andhra Pradesh Legislative Assembly

Constituency details
- Country: India
- Region: South India
- State: Andhra Pradesh
- District: Visakhapatnam
- Lok Sabha constituency: Visakhapatnam
- Established: 1967
- Abolished: 2008
- Reservation: None

Visakhapatnam-I Assembly constituency was a constituency in Visakhapatnam district of Andhra Pradesh that elected representatives to the Andhra Pradesh Legislative Assembly in India. It was one of six assembly segments in the Visakhapatnam Lok Sabha constituency.

The constituency was established in 1967, as per the Delimitation Orders (1967) and abolished in 2008, as per the Delimitation Orders (2008).

== Members of Legislative Assembly ==
Year	Member	Political party
1967	Tenneti Viswanatham	Independent
1972	M. R. Deen	Indian National Congress
1978	Sunkari Alwar Das	Indian National Congress
1983	Grandhi Madhavi	Telugu Desam Party
1985	Allu Bhanumathi	Telugu Desam Party
1989	Eati Vijayalaxmi	Indian National Congress
1994	Abdul Rehman Shaik	Telugu Desam Party
1999	Kambhampati Hari Babu	Bharatiya Janata Party
2004	Dronamraju Satyanarayana	Indian National Congress
2006 by-election	Dronamraju Satyanarayana	Indian National Congress

== Election results ==
=== 2004 ===
2004 Andhra Pradesh Legislative Assembly election: Visakhapatnam-I
Party	Candidate	Votes	%	±%
INC	Dronamraju Satyanarayana			
Majority				
Turnout				
INC gain from		Swing		
