= Kanchikacherla =

Suburb in India

- Suburb
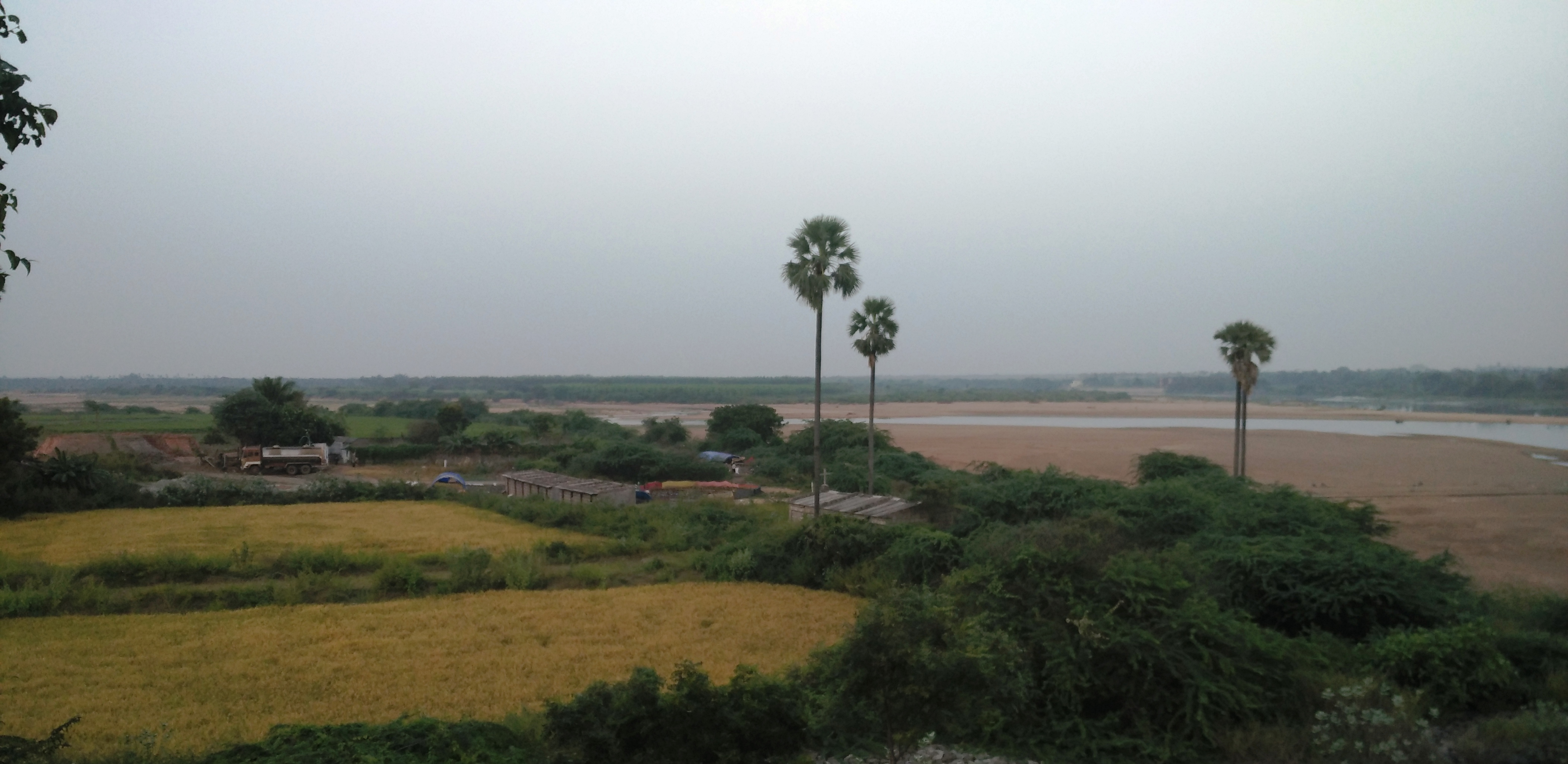
- Interactive map of Kanchikacherla
- Location in Andhra Pradesh, India
- Coordinates: 16.6856°N 80.3892°E
- Country: India
- State: Andhra Pradesh
- District: NTR

Government
  - Body: Kanchikacherla Panchayath
  - MLA: Tangirala Soumya
  - MP: Kesineni Shivanath (Chinni)

Area
  - Total: 29.50 km^{2} (11.39 sq mi)

Population (2011)
  - Total: 22,756
  - Density: 771.4/km^{2} (1,998/sq mi)

Languages
  - Official: Telugu
- Time zone: UTC+5:30 (IST)
- PIN: 521180
- Telephone code: 8678
- Vehicle registration: AP16
- Lok Sabha constituency: Vijayawada
- Assembly constituency: Nandigama (SC)

Kanchikacherla is a suburb of Vijayawada in the Indian state of Andhra Pradesh. It is located in Kanchikacherla mandal of Nandigama revenue division.

== Transport ==
Vijayawada is the nearest town to Kanchikacherla and is approximately 35 km away.

== Notable people ==
- Devineni Venkata Ramana (1960–1999), politician

== See also ==
- Villages in Kanchikacherla mandal
