= Eati Vijayalaxmi =

Indian politician (1951–2002)

Eati Vijayalaxmi (1951 – 6 August 2002) is an Indian politician from Andhra Pradesh. She was a former elected Member of the Legislative Assembly in 1989 from Visakhapatnam-I Assembly constituency, in Visakhapatnam district.

Vijayalaxmi entered politics in 1987 and became an MLA winning the 1989 Andhra Pradesh Legislative Assembly election from Visakhapatnam-1 Assembly constituency representing the Indian National Congress. She polled 39,387 votes and defeated her nearest rival, Bhattam Srirama Murthy of the Telugu Desam Party, by a margin of 14,338 votes. She contested from Parvada Assembly constituency and lost in 1994 and she did not get a ticket in 1999. She served as the vice president of Mahila Congress.

Vijayalaxmi died in Visakhapatnam at a private hospital on 6 August 2002. She is survived by her husband, a son and a daughter.
