= Nandigama Assembly constituency =

Constituency of the Andhra Pradesh Legislative Assembly, India

Coordinates: 16.77°N 80.29°E

Nandigama
- Constituency No. 83 for the Andhra Pradesh Legislative Assembly
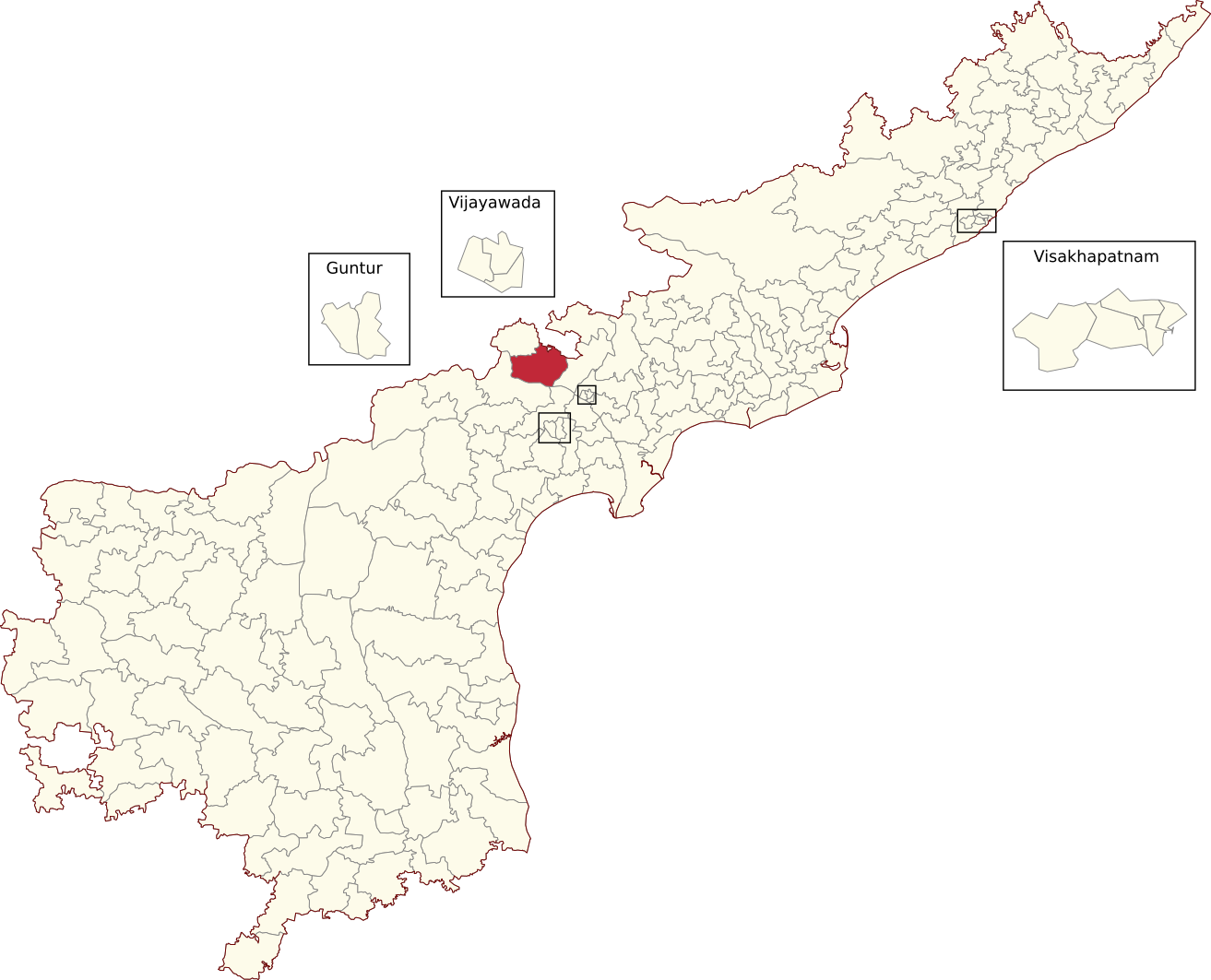
- Location of Nandigama Assembly constituency within Andhra Pradesh

Constituency details
- Country: India
- Region: South India
- State: Andhra Pradesh
- District: NTR
- Lok Sabha constituency: Vijayawada
- Established: 1955
- Total electors: 195,011
- Reservation: SC

Member of Legislative Assembly
- 16th Andhra Pradesh Legislative Assembly
- Incumbent Tangirala Sowmya
- Party: TDP
- Alliance: NDA
- Elected year: 2024

Nandigama is a Scheduled Caste reserved constituency in NTR district of Andhra Pradesh that elects representatives to the Andhra Pradesh Legislative Assembly in India. It is one of the seven assembly segments of Vijayawada Lok Sabha constituency.

Tangirala Sowmya is the current MLA of the constituency, having won the 2024 Andhra Pradesh Legislative Assembly election with the Telugu Desam Party. As of 2019, there are a total of 195,011 electors in the constituency. The constituency was established in 1955, as per the Delimitation Orders (1955).

== Mandals ==
The four mandals that form the assembly constituency are:

Mandal
Kanchikacherla
Chandarlapadu
Veerullapadu
Nandigama (Part) Pedavaram, Thakkellapadu, Munagacherla, Latchapalem, Lingalapadu, Adiviravulapadu, Chandapuram, Kethaveeruni Padu, Kanchela, Ithavaram, Ambarupeta, Nandigama, Satyavaram, Pallagiri and Raghavapuram Villages.

== Members of the Legislative Assembly ==
| Year | Member | Political party |
|---|---|---|
| 1955 | Pillalamarri Venkateswarlu | Communist Party of India |
| 1962 | Pillalamarri Venkateswarlu | Communist Party of India |
| 1967 | Adusumalli Suryanarayana Rao | Indian National Congress |
| 1972 | Vasantha Nageswara Rao | Indian National Congress |
| 1978 | Mukkapati Venkateswara Rao | Janata Party |
| 1983 | Vasantha Nageswara Rao | Telugu Desam Party |
| 1985 | Vasantha Nageswara Rao | Telugu Desam Party |
| 1989 | Mukkapati Venkateswara Rao | Indian National Congress |
| 1994 | Devineni Venkata Ramana | Telugu Desam Party |
| 1999 | Devineni Uma Maheswara Rao | Telugu Desam Party |
| 2004 | Devineni Uma Maheswara Rao | Telugu Desam Party |
| 2009 | Tangirala Prabhakara Rao | Telugu Desam Party |
| 2014 | Tangirala Prabhakara Rao | Telugu Desam Party |
| 2014 by-election | Tangirala Sowmya | Telugu Desam Party |
| 2019 | Monditoka Jagan Mohana Rao | YSR Congress Party |
| 2024 | Tangirala Sowmya | Telugu Desam Party |

== Election results ==
=== 1955 ===
1955 Andhra Pradesh Legislative Assembly election: Nandigama
| Party | Candidate | Votes | % | ±% |
|---|---|---|---|---|
| CPI | Pillalamarri Venkateswarlu | 24,066 | 50.23% | |
| INC | Kotaru Venkateswarlu | 23,848 | 49.77% | |
| Margin of victory | | 218 | 0.45% | |
| Turnout | | 47,914 | 75.22% | |
| Registered electors | | 63,698 | | |
| CPI win (new seat) | | | | |

=== 1962 ===
1962 Andhra Pradesh Legislative Assembly election: Nandigama
| Party | Candidate | Votes | % | ±% |
|---|---|---|---|---|
| CPI | Pillalamarri Venkateswarlu | 19,941 | 43.24% | |
| INC | Bandi Tirupathayya | 18,213 | 39.49% | |
| Margin of victory | | 1,728 | 3.75% | |
| Turnout | | 47,380 | 76.55% | |
| Registered electors | | 61,898 | | |
| CPI hold | | Swing | | |

=== 1967 ===
1967 Andhra Pradesh Legislative Assembly election: Nandigama
| Party | Candidate | Votes | % | ±% |
|---|---|---|---|---|
| INC | Adusumalli Suryanarayana Rao | 25,162 | 46.70% | |
| CPI | P Kodanadaramayya | 17,431 | 32.35% | |
| Margin of victory | | 7,731 | 14.35% | |
| Turnout | | 55,260 | 81.55% | |
| Registered electors | | 67,760 | | |
| INC gain from CPI | | Swing | | |

=== 1972 ===
1972 Andhra Pradesh Legislative Assembly election: Nandigama
| Party | Candidate | Votes | % | ±% |
|---|---|---|---|---|
| INC | Vasantha Nageswara Rao | 38,155 | 60.94% | |
| Independent | V Satyanarayana Prasad | 21,964 | 35.08% | |
| Margin of victory | | 16,191 | 25.86% | |
| Turnout | | 63,838 | 78.73% | |
| Registered electors | | 81,088 | | |
| INC hold | | Swing | | |

=== 1978 ===
1978 Andhra Pradesh Legislative Assembly election: Nandigama
| Party | Candidate | Votes | % | ±% |
|---|---|---|---|---|
| JP | Mukkapati Venkateswara Rao | 31,771 | 41.35% | |
| INC(I) | Gude Madhusudhana Rao | 24,493 | 31.88% | |
| INC | Adusumalli Suryanarayana Rao | 20,564 | 26.77% | |
| Margin of victory | | 7,278 | 9.47% | |
| Turnout | | 78,206 | 81.98% | |
| Registered electors | | 95,396 | | |
| JP gain from INC | | Swing | | |

=== 1983 ===
1983 Andhra Pradesh Legislative Assembly election: Nandigama
| Party | Candidate | Votes | % | ±% |
|---|---|---|---|---|
| TDP | Vasantha Nageswara Rao | 37,117 | 51.31% | |
| INC | Mukkapati Venkateswara Rao | 26,619 | 36.80% | |
| Margin of victory | | 10,498 | 14.51% | |
| Turnout | | 73,314 | 73.80% | |
| Registered electors | | 99,343 | | |
| TDP gain from JP | | Swing | | |

=== 1985 ===
1985 Andhra Pradesh Legislative Assembly election: Nandigama
| Party | Candidate | Votes | % | ±% |
|---|---|---|---|---|
| TDP | Vasantha Nageswara Rao | 45,206 | 50.65% | |
| INC | Sri Goplakrishna Sai Bobbellapati | 43,268 | 48.47% | |
| Margin of victory | | 1,938 | 2.17% | |
| Turnout | | 90,064 | 78.33% | |
| Registered electors | | 114,975 | | |
| TDP hold | | Swing | | |

=== 1989 ===
1989 Andhra Pradesh Legislative Assembly election: Nandigama
| Party | Candidate | Votes | % | ±% |
|---|---|---|---|---|
| INC | Mukkapati Venkateswara Rao | 51,421 | 50.63% | |
| TDP | Mallela Pullaiah Babu | 49,008 | 48.25% | |
| Margin of victory | | 2,413 | 2.38% | |
| Turnout | | 103,728 | 77.34% | |
| Registered electors | | 134,124 | | |
| INC gain from TDP | | Swing | | |

=== 1994 ===
1994 Andhra Pradesh Legislative Assembly election: Nandigama
| Party | Candidate | Votes | % | ±% |
|---|---|---|---|---|
| TDP | Devineni Venkata Ramana | 57,854 | 53.20% | |
| INC | Sri Gopalakrishna Sai Bobbellapati | 47,603 | 43.77% | |
| BSP | Kalekuri Prasad | 1,467 | 1.35% | |
| Margin of victory | | 10,251 | 9.43% | |
| Turnout | | 110,099 | 76.58% | |
| Registered electors | | 143,766 | | |
| TDP gain from INC | | Swing | | |

=== 1999 ===
1999 Andhra Pradesh Legislative Assembly election: Nandigama
| Party | Candidate | Votes | % | ±% |
|---|---|---|---|---|
| TDP | Devineni Uma Maheswara Rao | 65,673 | 57.08% | |
| INC | Vasantha Venkata Krishna Prasad | 42,162 | 36.64% | |
| Margin of victory | | 23,511 | 20.43% | |
| Turnout | | 117,587 | 76.34% | |
| Registered electors | | 154,034 | | |
| TDP hold | | Swing | | |

=== 2004 ===
2004 Andhra Pradesh Legislative Assembly election: Nandigama
| Party | Candidate | Votes | % | ±% |
|---|---|---|---|---|
| TDP | Devineni Uma Maheswara Rao | 63,445 | 50.69 | −6.39 |
| INC | Vasantha Nageswara Rao | 59,160 | 47.26 | +10.62 |
| Majority | | 4,285 | 3.43 | |
| Turnout | | 125,173 | 80.18 | +5.48 |
| Registered electors | | 156,120 | | |
| TDP hold | | Swing | | |

=== 2009 ===
2009 Andhra Pradesh Legislative Assembly election: Nandigama
| Party | Candidate | Votes | % | ±% |
|---|---|---|---|---|
| TDP | Tangirala Prabhakara Rao | 60,489 | 43.32 | −7.37 |
| INC | Parameswara Rao Velpula | 55,318 | 39.62 | −7.64 |
| Majority | | 5,171 | 3.70 | |
| Turnout | | 139,629 | 81.67 | +1.49 |
| Registered electors | | 170,965 | | |
| TDP hold | | Swing | | |

=== 2014 ===
2014 Andhra Pradesh Legislative Assembly election: Nandigama
| Party | Candidate | Votes | % | ±% |
|---|---|---|---|---|
| TDP | Tangirala Prabhakar Rao | 77,537 | 49.98 | |
| YSRCP | M Jagan Mohan Rao | 72,463 | 46.71 | |
| Majority | | 5,074 | 3.27 | |
| Turnout | | 155,136 | 84.29 | +2.61 |
| Registered electors | | 184,092 | | |
| TDP hold | | Swing | | |

=== 2014 (By-poll) ===
2014 Andhra Pradesh Legislative Assembly by-election: : Nandigama
| Party | Candidate | Votes | % | ±% |
|---|---|---|---|---|
| TDP | Tangirala Sowmya | 99,748 | 78.27 | |
| INC | Bodapati Baburao | 24,921 | 19.55 | |
| Majority | | 74,827 | 58.71 | |
| Turnout | | 127,434 | 69.23 | +2.61 |
| Registered electors | | 184,064 | | |
| TDP hold | | Swing | | |

=== 2019 ===
2019 Andhra Pradesh Legislative Assembly election: Nandigama
| Party | Candidate | Votes | % | ±% |
|---|---|---|---|---|
| YSRCP | Monditoka Jagan Mohana Rao | 87,493 | 51.32 | |
| TDP | Tangirala Sowmya | 76,612 | 44.94 | |
| Majority | | 10,881 | 6.38 | |
| Turnout | | 170,474 | 87.67 | +4.46 |
| Registered electors | | 154,034 | | |
| YSRCP gain from TDP | | Swing | | |

=== 2024 ===
2024 Andhra Pradesh Legislative Assembly election: Nandigama
| Party | Candidate | Votes | % | ±% |
|---|---|---|---|---|
| TDP | Tangirala Sowmya | 102,201 | 56.16 | |
| YSRCP | Monditoka Jagan Mohana Rao | 74,806 | 41.1 | |
| INC | Manda Vajraiah | 1,486 | 0.82 | |
| NOTA | None of the above | 928 | 0.51 | |
| Majority | | 27,395 | 15.06 | |
| Turnout | | 1,81,991 | | |
| TDP gain from YSRCP | | Swing | | |

== See also ==
- List of constituencies of the Andhra Pradesh Legislative Assembly
