= Vasantha Nageswara Rao =

Indian politician

Vasantha Nageswara Rao (born 29 July) is an Indian politician from Andhra Pradesh. He is a former three time member of the Andhra Pradesh Legislative Assembly from Nandigama Assembly constituency in the then Krishna district representing the Indian National Congress in 1972 and the Telugu Desam Party in 1983 and 1985.

== Early life ==
Rao is from Nandigama, Krishna district, Andhra Pradesh. He served as a home minister of in the undivided Andhra Pradesh. His son Vasantha Venkata Krishna Prasad served as an MLA from Mylavaram Assembly constituency.

== Career ==
Rao first became an MLA winning the Nandigama Assembly constituency in the 1972 Andhra Pradesh Legislative Assembly election representing the Indian National Congress. He polled 38,155 votes and defeated his nearest rival, V Satyanarayana Prasad, an independent candidate, by a margin of 16,191 votes. Later, he moved to the Telugu Desam Party when NT Rama Rao founded the new outfit, and won again in 1983 and 1985 elections. In the 1983 Andhra Pradesh Legislative Assembly election, he polled 37,117 votes and beat his closest opponent, Mukkapati Venkateswara Rao of the Indian National Congress, by a margin of 10,498 votes. He recorded another consecutive win in the 1985 Andhra Pradesh Legislative Assembly election where he polled 45,206 votes and defeated the TDP candidate, Sri Goplakrishna Sai Bobbellapati, by a margin of 1,938 votes.
