= Monditoka Jagan Mohana Rao =

Indian politician

- Born: 1966 (age 59–60); Nandigama
- Education: Dr. NTR University of Health Sciences
- Occupation: Politician
- Political party: YSR Congress Party
- Spouse: Peddada Rama Devi

Monditoka Jagan Mohana Rao (born 1966) is an Indian politician from Andhra Pradesh, who won the 2019 Andhra Pradesh Legislative Assembly election from Nandigama Constituency, which is reserved for SC community in Krishna district on YSR Congress Party ticket. YSRCP nominated him to contest the Nandigama seat for the 2024 Assembly Election.

== Early life and education ==
Mohana Rao was born in Rytupet, Nandigama, Krishna district. He is a, doctor. He married Peddada Rama Devi, a gynaecologist. He has two children, Siva Sai Krishna, Krishna Sameer. He completed his MD in 2005 from Guntur Medical College, affiliated to NTR University of Health Sciences, Vijayawada.

== Career ==
Mohana Rao started his political journey with the Indian National Congress Party but later joined YSRCP. He was elected as MLA from Nandigama Constituency representing YSRCP in the 2019 Andhra Pradesh Legislative Assembly Election defeating Tangirala Sowmya of TDP by 10,881 votes. He received good comments about his work in the constituency even by rival Telugu Desam Party MP Kesineni Nani. He also did a padayatra in February 2020 to support the three capital policy.
