= Kankipadu Assembly constituency =

Defunct Legislative Assembly constituency in Andhra Pradesh, India

Coordinates: 16.43°N 80.77°E

Kankipadu
- Former constituency for the Andhra Pradesh Legislative Assembly

Constituency details
- Country: India
- Region: South India
- State: Andhra Pradesh
- District: Krishna
- Lok Sabha constituency: Vijayawada
- Established: 1951
- Abolished: 2008
- Total electors: 121,878
- Reservation: None

Kankipadu was one of the Legislative Assembly constituencies of Andhra Pradesh in India. It was in Krishna district.

== History of the constituency ==
The Kankipadu constituency was first created for the Madras State Legislative Assembly in 1952 by the 1951 delimitation. After the passing of the States Reorganisation Act, 1956, it became a part of the new Andhra Pradesh Legislative Assembly. After the passing of the Delimitation of Parliamentary and Assembly Constituencies Order, 1976, its extent was the Kankipadu, Poranki and Vijayawada firks in Vijayawada taluk excluding vijayawada municipality of Krishna district.

It was not present in the Delimitation of Parliamentary and Assembly Constituencies Order, 2008 and hence was defunct as of the 2009 Andhra Pradesh Legislative Assembly election.

== Members of Legislative Assembly ==
Election	MLA	Party
1983	Devineni Nehru	Telugu Desam Party
1985	Devineni Nehru	Telugu Desam Party
1989	Devineni Nehru	Telugu Desam Party
1994	Devineni Nehru	Telugu Desam Party
1999	Yalamanchili Nageswara Rao	Telugu Desam Party
2004	Devineni Nehru	Indian National Congress

== Election results ==
2004 Andhra Pradesh Legislative Assembly election: Kankipadu
Party	Candidate	Votes	%	±%
INC	Devineni Nehru	103,181	54.92	
TDP	Gadde Rammohan rao	85,656	42.98	
Majority		17,525	8.95	
Turnout		98,789	81.05	
Registered electors		121,878		
INC hold		Swing		

== See also ==
- List of constituencies of the Andhra Pradesh Legislative Assembly
- Krishna district
