= Ithavaram =

Coordinates: 16.727°N 80.325°E

Ithavaram is a village in Nandigama mandal in NTR district, Andhra Pradesh, India.
