= Devineni Nehru =

Indian politician

Minister of Employment & Technical Education Government of Andhra Pradesh
- In office 12 December 1994 – 1 September 1995
- Governor: Krishan Kant
- Chief Minister: N. T. Rama Rao
- Succeeded by: Balli Durga Prasad Rao

Member of Legislative Assembly Andhra Pradesh
- In office 2004–2009
- Preceded by: Yalamanchili Nageswara Rao
- Succeeded by: Constituency Abolished
- Constituency: Kankipadu
- In office 1983–1999
- Preceded by: Koneru Ranga Rao
- Succeeded by: Yalamanchili Nageswara Rao
- Constituency: Kankipadu

Personal details
- Born: Devineni Rajasekhar; 22 June 1954 Kankipadu Mandal, Krishna District
- Died: 17 April 2017 (aged 62)
- Party: Telugu Desam Party (1982–1995, 2016–2017)
- Other political affiliations: Indian National Congress (1996–2016)
- Children: 2 including Devineni Avinash (son)
- Relatives: Devineni Uma Maheswara Rao (cousin brother); Devineni Venkata Ramana (cousin brother)

Devineni Nehru (born Devineni Rajasekhar; 22 June 1954 – 17 April 2017) was an Indian politician and lawmaker who represented Kankipadu Assembly Constituency in Krishna District in the state of Andhra Pradesh.

== Life ==
Nehru was born on 22 June 1954 in Vijayawada. He received B.A. degree from S.R.R & C.V.R college, Vijayawada. His first career was in agriculture. He is the son of Sri D. Rama Krishna Vara Prasad. He married Smt. Devineni Lakshmi. They have a daughter Kranthi and a son Devineni Avinash.

== Career ==
Rajasekhar served as a Minister (1994–96) in the cabinet of late Chief Minister N.T. Ramarao's TDP Government. Rajasekhar won five terms (1983, 1985, 1989, 1994 and 2004) as an MLA from Kankipadu Assembly Constituency. In 2004 he got elected, fighting on the ticket from the Indian National Congress, colloquially known as The Congress Party. In the same Elections Y.S. Raja Sekhar Reddy (Y.S.R.) became the Chief Minister. Rajasekhar lost in 2009 elections with a difference of a meagre 190 votes. After the Andhra state bifurcation, he lost the 2014 elections fighting on the Indian National Congress's (INC) ticket. He later rejoined Telugu Desam Party.

== Death ==
He died of cardiac arrest on 17 April 2017 at his house in Hyderabad.
