= Grandhi Madhavi =

Indian politician

Grandhi Madhavi (died 19 December 2006) was an Indian politician from Andhra Pradesh. She was a former member of the Andhra Pradesh Legislative Assembly from the Visakhapatnam-I Assembly constituency in 1983 representing the Telugu Desam Party.

She won the Visakhapatnam-I Assembly consntituency in the 1983 Andhra Pradesh Legislative Assembly election. She polled 37,447 votes and defeated her nearest rival, Sunkari Alwar Das of the Indian National Congress, by 28,880 votes.

== Death ==
Madhavi died on 19 December 2006, allegedly murdered at her house in Banjara Hills, Hyderabad.
