= Tangirala Sowmya =

Indian politician

Member of the Andhra Pradesh Legislative Assembly
- In office September 2014 – 2019
- Chief Minister: N. Chandrababu Naidu
- Preceded by: Tangirala Prabhakara Rao
- Constituency: Nandigama (SC)

Personal details
- Born: 12 April Nandigama, Andhra Pradesh, India
- Party: Telugu Desam Party
- Children: 2
- Profession: Politician

Tangirala Sowmya (born 12 April 1981), is an Indian politician from Andhra Pradesh. She won the 2014 by election to the Andhra Pradesh Legislative Assembly on Telugu Desam Party ticket from Nandigama constituency in the NTR District. She defeated Bodapati Baburao of Indian National Congress by a margin of 74,827 votes. The by poll was necessitated following the death of her father Tangirala Prabhakara Rao. She won Nandigama MLA seat in 2024 Andhra Pradesh Legislative Assembly Election and was appointed whip on 12 November 2024.
