= Devineni Venkata Ramana =

Indian politician

Minister of Primary Education of Andhra Pradesh
- In office 1997–1999
- Chief Minister: N. Chandrababu Naidu

Member of Legislative Assembly Andhra Pradesh
- In office 1994–1999
- Preceded by: Mukkapati Venkateswara Rao
- Succeeded by: Devineni Uma Maheswara Rao
- Constituency: Nandigama

Personal details
- Born: 21 September 1960 Kanchikacherla, Krishna District, India
- Died: 3 June 1999 (aged 38) Khajipeta, Telangana, India
- Party: Telugu Desam Party
- Spouse: Devineni Pranita
- Children: 2 Daughters

Devineni Venkata Ramana (21 September 1960 – 3 June 1999), popularly known as DVR, was an Indian politician active in several years. He was the cabinet minister of Andhra Pradesh from 1996 to 1999. He represented Nandigama Assembly constituency in Krishna district of the Indian state of Andhra Pradesh.

== Early life and education ==
Ramana was born in Kanchikacherla, Krishna district, Andhra Pradesh, India.

Ramana completed his primary education in Kanchikacherla, and intermediate in V.S.R. & N.V.R. College, Tenali.Pursued degree in S.R.R. & C.V.R. College, Vijayawada

== Personal life ==
Devineni Venkata Ramana married Praneetha. He has two daughters Snigdha Devineni and Pragnya Devineni, who are American citizens by birth. His brother Devineni Uma Maheswara Rao is a senior politician and also served as Andhra Pradesh irrigation minister and is still actively participating as a senior politician in Telugu desam party

== Positions held ==
- 1994–1999 : MLA

As member of legislative assembly

- 1994: Elected from Nandigama (Assembly constituency)

As minister

- 1997–1999: Education Minister
