= Devineni Uma Maheswara Rao =

Indian politician

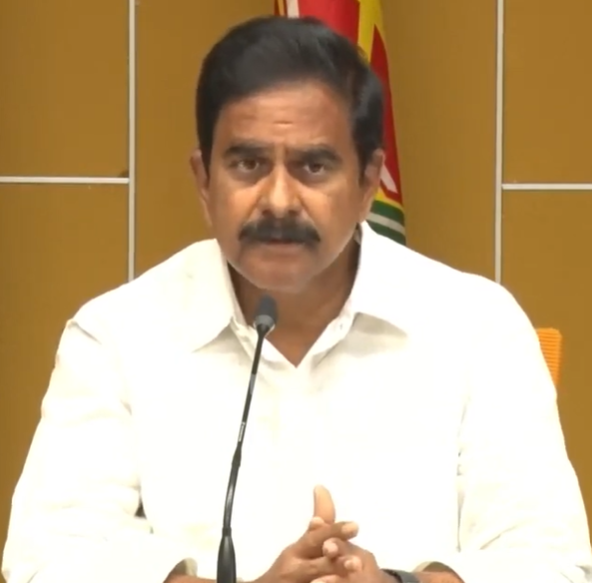
- Rao in 2023

Minister of Water Resources Development Government of Andhra Pradesh
- In office 8 Jun 2014 – 29 May 2019
- Governor: E. S. L. Narasimhan
- Chief Minister: N. Chandrababu Naidu
- Preceded by: Office established
- Succeeded by: Poluboina Anil Kumar

Member of Legislative Assembly, Andhra Pradesh
- In office 2009–2019
- Preceded by: Chanamolu Venkata Rao
- Succeeded by: Vasantha Krishna Prasad
- Constituency: Mylavaram
- In office 1999–2009
- Preceded by: Devineni Venkata Ramana
- Succeeded by: Tangirala Prabhakara Rao
- Constituency: Nandigama

Personal details
- Born: 29 March 1962 (age 64) Vijayawada, Andhra Pradesh, India
- Party: Telugu Desam Party
- Children: 2
- Relatives: Devineni Venkata Ramana (brother); Devineni Nehru (cousin brother)

Devineni Uma Maheswara Rao (born 1962), better known as Uma, is a politician in the state of Andhra Pradesh, India. He was elected to the Andhra Pradesh Legislative Assembly for four terms in 1999, 2004, 2009 and 2014. He also served as a minister in the N. Chandrababu Naidu government from 2014 to 2019.

== Early life and education ==
Rao is born in Vijayawada. He has two children, Nihar and Gnathavya.

== Career ==
He was elected as an MLA for the first time in 1999 from the Nandigama Constituency and retained the assembly seat in 2004. Later, he shifted to Mylavaram Constituency and won in 2009 and 2014, also on Telugu Desam ticket. He served as the president of the Krishna District Telugu Desam Party and went on to become the General Secretary of the party. In March 2024, he was made the coordinator of TDP for the parliament and assembly elections. But later, he was dropped from contesting from Mylavaram Constituency in the 2024 Assembly Election. For the Mylavaram seat, TDP nominated Vasantha Venkata Krishna Prasad, who quit YSRCP and joined the party in February 2024.

== Controversies ==
Rao was arrested in November 2011 on alleged charges of obstructing government officials from doing their duty at a mass contact programme, named Rachhabanda. On 28 July 2021, Rao was arrested along with 17 others on charges of alleged rioting at G. Kondur police station, in Krishna district. Two days later, the police placed Rao and a few other Telugu Desam leaders under house arrest to prevent them from undertaking a fact-finding visit to Kondapalli Reserve Forest.
