= 1972 Andhra Pradesh Legislative Assembly election =

- 15 March 1972

All 287 seats in the Andhra Pradesh Legislative Assembly 144 seats needed for a majority
- Registered: 24,607,903
- Turnout: 14,693,030 (59.71%) ▼9.44%
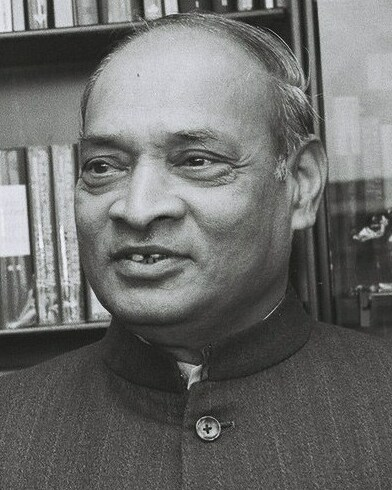
	Majority party	Minority party
		CPI
Leader	P. V. Narasimha Rao	Baddam Yella Reddy
Party	INC(R)	CPI
Leader since	1972	1972
Leader's seat	Manthani (won)	Indurthi (won)
Last election	Party did not exist	11 seats, 7.78%
Seats won	219	7
Seat change	New party	▼4
Popular vote	7,474,255	854,742
Percentage	52.29%	5.98%
Swing	New party	▼1.80%
- 1972 Andhra Pradesh Legislative Assembly election results
Chief Minister before election
Kasu Brahmananda Reddy
INC
Chief Minister after election
P. V. Narasimha Rao
INC(R)

The 1972 Andhra Pradesh Legislative Assembly election was held in 1972. It was the fifth after formation of states. Indian National Congress won 219 seats out of 287 seats. While, Communist Party of India won 7 seats and independents won 57 seats.

The number of polling stations was 29,721 and the number of electors per polling station was 828.

== Results ==
=== Vote share ===
Vote share by party
1. Indian National Congress (Requisitionists) (52.3%)
2. Communist Party of India (5.98%)
3. Swatantra Party (1.98%)
4. Communist Party of India (Marxist) (3.18%)
5. Sampurna Telangana Praja Samithi (1.66%)
6. Others (34.9%)

=== Seat share ===
Seat share by party
1. Indian National Congress (Requisitionists) (76.3%)
2. Communist Party of India (2.44%)
3. Swatantra Party (0.70%)
4. Communist Party of India (Marxist) (0.35%)
5. Sampurna Telangana Praja Samithi (0.35%)
6. Others (19.9%)

=== Results by party ===
Party	Popular vote			Seats		
Party	Votes	%	±pp	Contested	Won	+/−
Indian National Congress (Requisitionists)	7,474,255	52.29	new	287	219	new
Communist Party of India	854,742	5.98	▼1.80	59	7	▼4
Swatantra Party	282,949	1.98	▼7.86	20	2	▼27
Communist Party of India (Marxist)	454,038	3.18	▼4.43	32	1	▼5
Sampurna Telangana Praja Samithi	237,934	1.66	new	40	1	new
Other parties	383,762	2.70	N/A	87	0	N/A
Independents	4,604,943	32.22	▲5.81	488	57	▼11
Total	14,292,623	100.00	N/A	1,013	287	N/A
Vote statistics
Valid votes	14,292,623	97.27				
Invalid votes	400,407	2.73				
Votes cast/ turnout	14,693,030	59.71				
Abstentions	9,914,873	40.29				
Registered voters	24,607,903					

=== Results by constituency ===
#	Constituency	Reserved for (SC/ST/None)	Member	Party
1	Ichapuram	None	Uppada Rangababu	Indian National Congress
2	Sompeta	None	Majji Tulasidas	Indian National Congress
3	Tekkali	None	Sattaru Lokanadham Naidu	Indian National Congress
4	Harischandrapuram	None	Kappalanarasimhan Bhukta	Indian National Congress
5	Narasannapeta	None	Baggu Sarojanamma	Indian National Congress
6	Patapatnam	SC	Sukka Pagadalu	Indian National Congress
7	Kothuru	ST	Narasimharao Viswasarai	Independent
8	Naguru	ST	C Chudamani Dev V	Independent
9	Parvathipuram	None	Chikati Parasuram Naidu	Independent
10	Salur	ST	Mutyallu Janni	Indian National Congress
11	Bobbili	None	C V Krishna Rao	Indian National Congress
12	Pedamanapuram	None	Lakshumu Naidu Tentu	Independent
13	Vunukuru	None	Palavalasa Rukminamma	Indian National Congress
14	Palakonda	SC	Kottapalli Narasayya	Indian National Congress
15	Nagarikatakam	None	Pydi Sri Rama Murthy	Independent
16	Srikakulam	None	Challa Lakshminarayana	Independent
17	Etcherla	None	Ballada Hariyappadu	Independent
18	Ponduru	None	Lakshmanadasu Lukalapu	Indian National Congress
19	Cheepurupalli	None	Pydapu Naidu Southu	Indian National Congress
20	Gajapathinagaram	None	Penumatsa Sambasiva Raju	Indian National Congress
21	Vtzianagaram	None	Appannadora Appasani	Indian National Congress
22	Bhogapuram	None	Appadudora Kommuru	Indian National Congress
23	Bhemunipatnam	None	D S Suryanarayana	Indian National Congress
24	Visakhapatnam I	None	Sri M R Deen	Indian National Congress
25	Visakhapatnam I I	None	Pothina Sanyasi Rao	Independent
26	Jami	None	Appala S R Uppalapati	Independent
27	Madugula	None	Boddu Kalavathi	Indian National Congress
28	Srungavarapukota	None	Kakaralapudi V R S P Raju	Indian National Congress
29	Paderu	ST	Tamarba Chittinaidu	Indian National Congress
30	Gompa	None	Goorle Krishnam Naidu	Indian National Congress
31	Chodavaram	None	Palavelli Vechalapu	Indian National Congress
32	Anakapalli	None	Pentakota Venkata Ramana	Indian National Congress
33	Paravada	None	Bhattam Sriram Murthy	Indian National Congress
34	Elamanchili	None	Kakaralapudi K Venkata	Independent
35	Payakaraopeta	SC	Gantlana Suryanarayana	Indian National Congress
36	Narasipatnam	None	Suryanarayana R S R Sagi	Indian National Congress
37	Chintapalli	ST	Inguva Ramanna Padalu	Indian National Congress
38	Yellavaram	ST	Ratnabai Tadapatla	Indian National Congress
39	Burugupudi	None	Korupuranachandrarao	Indian National Congress
40	Rajammundry	None	Bathula Mallikarjunarao	Indian National Congress
41	Kadiam	SC	Battiwa Subbarao	Indian National Congress
42	Jaggampeta	None	Pantham Padmanabham	Indian National Congress
43	Peddapuram	None	Kondapalli Krishnamurty	Indian National Congress
44	Prathipadu	None	Jpgiraju Varupula	Indian National Congress
45	Tuni	None	N Vijayalakshmi	Indian National Congress
46	Pithapuram	None	Yalla Suryanarayanamurty	Indian National Congress
47	Sampara	None	Cherukuvada Venkataratham	Indian National Congress
48	Kakinada	None	C V K Rao	Independent
49	Tallarevu	SC	Sathiraju Sadanala	Indian National Congress
50	Anaparthi	None	Ramakrishana Chowdary V	Indian National Congress
51	Ramachandramuram	None	Satyanarayana Reddi	Indian National Congress
52	Pamarru	None	Kamaladevi Gauham	Indian National Congress
53	Cheyyeru	None	Palla Venkata Rao	Indian National Congress
54	Allavaram	SC	Srivishnu Prasadarao Moka	Indian National Congress
55	Amalapuram	None	Kudupudi Prabhakara Rao	Indian National Congress
56	Kothapeta	None	Denduluri Bhanutilakam	Indian National Congress
57	Nagaram	SC	Geddam Mahalakshmi	Indian National Congress
58	Razole	None	Bikkina Gopalakrishnarao	Independent
59	Harasapur	None	Parakala Seshavataram	Indian National Congress
60	Palacole	None	Chegondi Venkata Hara	Indian National Congress
61	Achanta	SC	Gottimukkala Venkanna	Indian National Congress
62	Bhimavaram	None	B Vijaya Kumar Raju	Indian National Congress
63	Undi	None	Danduboyiwa Perazah	Indian National Congress
64	Penugonda	None	Vanka Satyanarayana	Communist Party of India
65	Tenuku	None	Gaunamani Satyanarayan	Indian National Congress
66	Attili	None	V Raju Kalidindi	Indian National Congress
67	Tadepalligudem	None	Eli Anjaneyulu	Independent
68	Ungutur	None	Chentalapati S V S Mr	Indian National Congress
69	Dendulur	None	Ramamohan R Motaparthy	Indian National Congress
70	Eluru	None	Amanaganti Sriramulu	Independent
71	Gopalapuram	SC	Sali Venkata Rao	Independent
72	Koyyur	None	Alla Hanumantha Rao	Independent
73	Polavaram	ST	Kanithi Ramulu	Indian National Congress
74	Chintalapudi	None	Koneswararao Dannapaneni	Independent
75	Jaggayyapet	None	V R G K M Prasad	Independent
76	Nandigama	None	Vasantha Nageswara Rao	Indian National Congress
77	Vijayawada East	None	Rama Rao Dammalapati	Indian National Congress
78	Vijayawada West	None	Asib Pasha	Indian National Congress
79	Kankipadu	None	Akkineni Bhaskra Rao	Indian National Congress
80	Mylavaram	None	Chanamolu Venkata Rao	Indian National Congress
81	Tiruyur	SC	Ramaiah Kota	Indian National Congress
82	Nuzvid	None	Meka Rajarangayyappa Rao	Indian National Congress
83	Gannavaram	None	E S Ananda Bai Tappata	Indian National Congress
84	Vuyyur	None	Kakani Venkataratnam	Indian National Congress
85	Gudivada	None	Katari Satyanarayana Rao	Indian National Congress
86	Mudinepalli	None	Ramanadham Kaza	Indian National Congress
87	Kaikalur	None	Kammili Mangatayaramma	Indian National Congress
88	Malleshwaram	None	Pinnerti Panideswana Rao	Indian National Congress
89	Bandar	None	Lakshmana Rao Pedasingu	Indian National Congress
90	Nidumolu	SC	Kanumuri Someswararan	Indian National Congress
91	Avanigadda	None	M. Venkatakrishna Rao	Indian National Congress
92	Kuchinapudi	None	Anagani Bhagavanta Rao	Indian National Congress
93	Repalle	None	Channaiah Yadam	Indian National Congress
94	Vemur	None	Yedlapati Venkatrao	Swatantra Party
95	Duggirala	None	Bontu Gopala Reddy	Indian National Congress
96	Tenali	None	Doudapaneni Indira	Independent
97	Ponnur	None	Doppalapudi Rangarao	Independent
98	Bapatla	None	Prabhakara Rao Kona	Indian National Congress
99	Prathipad	None	Peter Paul Chukka	Indian National Congress
100	Guntur I	None	Vijaya Ramanujam	Indian National Congress
101	Guntur I I	None	N. Rao Venkata Ratnam	Independent
102	Mangalagiri	None	Srikrishna Vemulapalli	Communist Party of India
103	Tadikonda	None	Rattaiah G. V.	Indian National Congress
104	Sattenapalli	None	Veeranjaneya Sarma Gada	Indian National Congress
105	Reddakurapadu	None	Pathimunnisa Begam	Indian National Congress
106	Gurzala	None	Nagireddy Mandpati	Communist Party of India
107	Macherla	None	Julakanti Nagireddy	Independent
108	Vinukonda	None	Bhavanam Jayapradha	Indian National Congress
109	Narasaraopet	None	Dondeti Krishnareddy	Indian National Congress
110	Chilakuluripet	None	Bobbala Satyanarayana	Indian National Congress
111	Parchur	None	Maddukuri Narayana Rao	Independent
112	Chirala	None	Kotaiah Guddanti	Indian National Congress
113	Addanki	None	Dasari Prakasam	Indian National Congress
114	Santhanuthacapadu	SC	Areti Kotaiah	Indian National Congress
115	Ongole	None	Srongavarapu Jeevaratnam	Indian National Congress
116	Kondapi	None	Divvi Sankaraiah	Communist Party of India
117	Kandukur	None	M. Audinarayana Reddy	Independent
118	Kanigiri	None	Sura Papi Reddy	Independent
119	Podili	None	Katuri Narayanaswamy	Independent
120	Darsi	None	D. Kaja Gopala Reddy	Indian National Congress
121	Yerragondipalem	None	Kandula Obul Reddy	Indian National Congress
122	Markapur	None	M. Nasar Baig	Indian National Congress
123	Giddalur	None	Pidathala Ranga Reddy	Indian National Congress
124	Udayagiri	None	Chenchuramaiah Ponneboina	Indian National Congress
125	Kavali	None	Gotti Pati Kondapa Naidu	Independent
126	Allur	None	Rebala D Rama Reddy	Indian National Congress
127	Kovur	None	P. Ramachandra Reddy	Indian National Congress
128	Atmakur	None	Kancharla Srihari Naidu	Indian National Congress
129	Rapur	None	N. Venkataratnam Naidu	Independent
130	Nellore	None	Venkata Reddy Anam	Indian National Congress
131	Sarvepalli	SC	Mangalagiri Nanadas	Indian National Congress
132	Gudur	None	D. Sreenivasul Reddi	Independent
133	Sullurpet	SC	Pitla Venkatasubbaiah	Indian National Congress
134	Venkatagiri	SC	Orepalli Venkaiasubbaiah	Indian National Congress
135	Kalahasti	None	Balarama Reddy Adduru	Independent
136	Satyavedu	SC	C. Dass	Indian National Congress
137	Nagari	None	Kilari Gopalu Naidu	Indian National Congress
138	Puttur	None	Elavarthi Gopal Raju	Indian National Congress
139	Vepanjeri	SC	V. Munasamappa	Indian National Congress
140	Chittoor	None	D. Anianeyulu Naidu	Indian National Congress
141	Bangaripoliem	SC	M. Munaswamy	Indian National Congress
142	Kuppam	None	D .Venkatesam	Independent
143	Palmaner	None	M. M. Rathnam	Indian National Congress
144	Punganur	None	Rani Sundabammanni	Indian National Congress
145	Madanapalle	None	Alluri Narasinga Row	Indian National Congress
146	Thamballapalle	None	T. N. Anasuyamma	Indian National Congress
147	Vayalpad	None	N. Amarnatha Reddy	Indian National Congress
148	Pileru	None	Mogal Syfulla Baig	Indian National Congress
149	Tirupathi	None	Vijayasikhamani	Indian National Congress
150	Kodur	SC	Sriramulu Gunti	Indian National Congress
151	Rajampet	None	Ratna Sabhapati Bandaru	Swatantra Party
152	Rayachoty	None	Habibullah Mahal	Indian National Congress
153	Lakkireddipalli	None	Rajgopal Reddy	Indian National Congress
154	Cuddapam	None	Gakka;a Ramga Reddy	Indian National Congress
155	Badvel	None	Bijivemula Veera Reddy	Indian National Congress
156	Mydukur	None	Settipalli Nagi Reddy	Indian National Congress
157	Paoddatur	None	Koppa Rabu Subba Rao	Indian National Congress
158	Jammalahadugu	None	N. Reddy Tharhireddy	Independent
159	Kamlapuram	None	Ranuva Seetha Ramiah	Indian National Congress
160	Pulivendla	None	Basireddi Penchikala	Indian National Congress
161	Kadiri	None	C. Narayana Reddy	Independent
162	Nallamda	None	Agisam Veerappa	Indian National Congress
163	Gorantla	None	P. Ravindra Reddy	Independent
164	Hindupur	None	G. Somasekhar	Indian National Congress
165	Madakasira	SC	M. Yellappa	Indian National Congress
166	Penukonda	None	S. D. Narayana Reddy	Indian National Congress
167	Kalyandrug	SC	M. Lakshmi Devi	Indian National Congress
168	Rayadrug	None	J. Thippeswamy	Indian National Congress
169	Uravakonda	None	Bukkitla Basappa	Independent
170	Gooty	None	Dudde Kunta Venkatareddy	Independent
171	Singanmala	None	Tarimela Ranga Reddy	Independent
172	Anatapur	None	Anantha Venkatareddy	Indian National Congress
173	Dharamavaram	None	P. V. Chowdary	Indian National Congress
174	Tadpatri	None	Challa Subbarayudu	Indian National Congress
175	Alur	SC	P. Rajaratna Rao	Indian National Congress
176	Adoni	None	H. Sathya Narayana	Indian National Congress
177	Yemmiganur	None	P. O. Sathyanarayana Raju	Indian National Congress
178	Kodumur	SC	D. Muniswamy	Indian National Congress
179	Kurnool	None	Rahiman Khan P.	Indian National Congress
180	Pattikonda	None	K. B. Narasappa	Indian National Congress
181	Dhone	None	Seshanna	Indian National Congress
182	Koilkuntla	None	B. V. Subbareddy	Indian National Congress
183	Allagahda	None	S. Venkata Subba Reddy	Independent
184	Panyam	None	Erasu Ayyapu Reddy	Indian National Congress
185	Nandikotkur	None	Maddru Subba Reddy	Indian National Congress
186	Nandyal	None	Bojja Venkatareddy	Independent
187	Achampet	SC	P. Mahendra Nath	Indian National Congress
188	Nagarkurnool	None	V. N. Goud	Indian National Congress
189	Kalwakurthi	None	S. Jaipal Reddy	Indian National Congress
190	Shadnagar	SC	N. V. Jagannadham	Indian National Congress
191	Jadcherla	None	N. Narasappa	Indian National Congress
192	Mahbubnagar	None	Ibrahim Ali Ansari	Indian National Congress
193	Wanakarthi	None	Ayyappa	Indian National Congress
194	Alampur	None	T. Chanra Sekhara Reddy	Indian National Congress
195	Kollapur	None	K. Rangadas	Independent
196	Gadwal	None	Paga Pulla Reddy	Indian National Congress
197	Amarchinta	None	Sombhopal	Indian National Congress
198	Makthal	None	Kalyani Ramchander Rao	Indian National Congress
199	Kodangal	None	Nandaram Venkataiah	Independent
200	Tandur	None	M. Manik Rao	Indian National Congress
201	Vicarabad	SC	Tirumalaiah	Independent
202	Pargi	None	K. Ram Reddy	Indian National Congress
203	Chevella	None	Kishan Rao	Indian National Congress
204	Ibrahimpatnam	None	N. Anantha Reddy	Indian National Congress
205	Musheerabad	None	T. Anjaiah	Indian National Congress
206	Gagan Mahal	None	Shanta Bai Talpallikar	Indian National Congress
207	Maharajganj	None	N. Laxmi Narayan	Indian National Congress
208	Khairatabad	None	Nagam Krishna Rao	Indian National Congress
209	Asafnagar	None	Syed Rahmat Ali	Indian National Congress
210	Sitarambagh	None	Shafiur Rahman	Independent
211	Malakpet	None	B. Sarojini Pulla Reddy	Indian National Congress
212	Yakutpura	None	Sultan Salahuddin Owaisi	Independent
213	Charminar	None	Syed Hassan	Independent
214	Secunderabad	None	L. Narayana	Indian National Congress
215	Secunderabad Cantt	SC	V. Mankamma	Indian National Congress
216	Medchal	SC	Sumitra Devi	Indian National Congress
217	Siddepet	None	Madan Mohan	Indian National Congress
218	Dommat	None	Ramachandra Reddy	Indian National Congress
219	Gajwel	SC	Gajwellisaidaiad	Indian National Congress
220	Narasapur	None	C Jagannath Rao	Indian National Congress
221	Sangareddy	None	P Ramachandra Reddy	Indian National Congress
222	Andole	SC	C Rajanarasimha	Indian National Congress
223	Zahirabad	None	M Baga Reddy	Indian National Congress
224	Narayankhed	None	Venkat Reddy	Independent
225	Medak	None	Karnam Ramchander Rao	Independent
226	Ramayanpet	None	Kondala Reddy	Independent
227	Balkonda	None	G Rajaram	Indian National Congress
228	Armoor	None	Tummala Rangareddy	Indian National Congress
229	Kamareddy	None	Y Sathyanarayana	Indian National Congress
230	Yellareddy	SC	J Eshwaribai	Sampurna Telangana Praja Samithi
231	Banswada	None	Sreenivasarao	Indian National Congress
232	Jukkal	None	Samal Vithal Reddy	Independent
233	Bodhan	None	Narayan Reddy	Indian National Congress
234	Nizamabad	None	V Chakradhar Rao	Independent
235	Mudhole	None	Gaddanna	Indian National Congress
236	Nirmal	None	P Narsa Reddy	Indian National Congress
237	Boath	ST	Dev Shah S A	Indian National Congress
238	Adilabad	None	Masood Ahmed	Indian National Congress
239	Asifabad	ST	K Bheem Rao	Indian National Congress
240	Sirpur	None	K V Keshavalu	Indian National Congress
241	Luxettipet	None	J V Narsingh Rao	Indian National Congress
242	Chinnur	SC	Kodati Rajammally	Indian National Congress
243	Manthani	None	P V Narsimha Rao	Indian National Congress
244	Peddapalli	None	Jinna Malla Reddy	Indian National Congress
245	Mydaram	SC	G Eswar	Indian National Congress
246	Huzurabad	None	Vodithela Rajeswar Rao	Indian National Congress
247	Kamalapur	None	Paripati Janardhan Reddy	Independent
248	Indurthi	None	Baddam Yella Reddy	Communist Party of India
249	Nusthulapur	SC	Premlata Devi	Indian National Congress
250	Karimnagar	None	Juvvadi Chokka Rao	Indian National Congress
251	Buggaram	None	Joginipalli Damodhar Rao	Independent
252	Jagtial	None	Velichala Jagapathi Rao	Indian National Congress
253	Metpalli	None	Chennamneni Sathyanarayana	Indian National Congress
254	Sirchilla	None	Juvvadi Narsinga Rao	Indian National Congress
255	Narella	SC	G. Bhoopathy	Independent
256	Cheriyal	SC	Pambala Katam Lingaiah	Indian National Congress
257	Jangaon	None	Kasani Narayana	Indian National Congress
258	Chennur	None	Kundoor Madhusudhan Reddy	Independent
259	Dornakal	None	N. Ramchandra Reddy	Indian National Congress
260	Mahabubabad	None	J. Janardhan Reddy	Indian National Congress
261	Narsampet	None	Maudikayala Omkar	Communist Party of India
262	Wardhasnnapet	None	T. Purushotham Rao	Independent
263	Ghanpur	None	T. Hayagriva Chary	Indian National Congress
264	Warangal	None	P. Uma Reddy	Indian National Congress
265	Hasanparthy	SC	Routu Narsimha Ramaiah	Indian National Congress
266	Parkal	None	Pingali Dharma Reddy	Indian National Congress
267	Mulug	None	Santosh Chakravarthy	Indian National Congress
268	Bhadrachalam	ST	Matta Ramachandraiah	Indian National Congress
269	Burgampahad	ST	Kamaram Ramayya	Indian National Congress
270	Palwancha	None	Chekuri Kasaiah	Indian National Congress
271	Vemsoor	None	Jacagam Vengala Rao	Indian National Congress
272	Madhira	None	Diggineri Venkatravamma	Indian National Congress
273	Palair	SC	Kathula Shanthah	Indian National Congress
274	Khammam	None	Mohd. Rajjab Ali	Communist Party of India
275	Yellandu	None	Vanga Subba Rao	Indian National Congress
276	Tungaturthi	None	Guruganti Venkat Narsaiah	Independent
277	Suryapet	SC	Yedla Gopaiah	Indian National Congress
278	Huzurnagar	None	Keasara J. Reddy	Independent
279	Miryalguda	None	C. K. Reddy Tippana	Indian National Congress
280	Chalakurthi	None	Nimmala Ramuli	Indian National Congress
281	Nakrekal	None	Musapota Kamalamm	Indian National Congress
282	Nalgonda	None	Chakilam Srinivasa Rao	Indian National Congress
283	Ramannapet	SC	Vaddepalli Kasiram	Indian National Congress
284	Alair	None	Anreddy Punna Reddy	Indian National Congress
285	Bhongir	None	Konda Lakshman Bapuji	Indian National Congress
286	Mungode	None	Govardhan Reddy Palvai	Indian National Congress
287	Deverkonda	None	Bondipali Ramsarma	Communist Party of India
