= 1999 Andhra Pradesh Legislative Assembly election =

- 5 September, 11 September and 18 September 1999

All 294 seats in the Andhra Pradesh Legislative Assembly 148 seats needed for a majority
- Registered: 49,654,389
- Turnout: 34,334,842 (69.15%) ▼1.87%
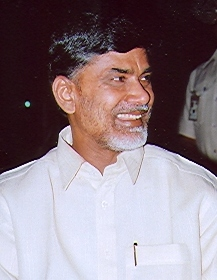

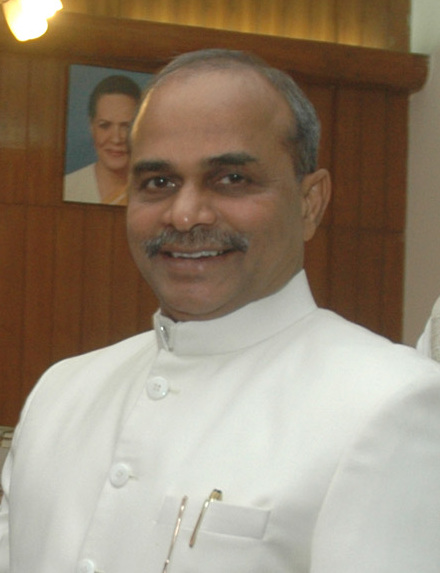
	Majority party	Minority party
Leader	N. Chandrababu Naidu	Y. S. Rajasekhara Reddy
Party	TDP	INC
Alliance	NDA	–
Leader since	1995	1999
Leader's seat	Kuppam (won)	Pulivendla (won)
Last election	216 seats, 44.14%	26 seats, 33.85%
Seats won	180	91
Seat change	▼36	▲65
Popular vote	14,613,307	13,526,309
Percentage	43.87%	40.61%
Swing	▼0.27%	▲6.76%
- 1999 Andhra Pradesh Legislative Assembly election results
Chief Minister before election
N. Chandrababu Naidu
TDP
Chief Minister after election
N. Chandrababu Naidu
TDP

The 1999 Andhra Pradesh Legislative Assembly election was conducted in 3 phases simultaneously with the 1999 Indian general election for the 11th Andhra Pradesh Assembly. The election was held on 5 September 1999, 11 September 1999 and 18 September 1999 for 91, 105 and 98 constituencies respectively. The election concluded with the Telugu Desam Party sweeping the polls with 180 seats and forming the government once again.

== Previous assembly ==
In the 1994 Andhra Pradesh Legislative Assembly election, the TDP won a decisive mandate and N. T. Rama Rao (NTR) was sworn in as Chief Minister. In August 1995, following internal party developments and a leadership challenge led by N. Chandrababu Naidu, NTR was replaced as Chief Minister. Naidu subsequently assumed office, with the majority of party legislators supporting him.

== Background ==
The incumbent Chief Minister N. Chandrababu Naidu led TDP swept the polls along with Bharatiya Janata Party as part of pre-poll alliance where Naidu agreed to extend his outside support to the Atal Bihari Vajpayee government in the simultaneous 1999 general election.

The TDP bagged a majority and formed the government for another term. N. Chandrababu Naidu was once again invited to form the government by the governor C. Rangarajan

The other new parties like Anna Telugu Desam Party led by Nandamuri Harikrishna and NTR Telugu Desam Party led by Lakshmi Parvathi although managed to split the voting share of the Naidu led TDP, but did not gain any single seat in the election. The opposition Indian National Congress led by Y. S. Rajasekhara Reddy was only restricted to 91 seats. Law and order, particularly the activities of Naxalite insurgents in certain districts, was a significant election issue. The TDP campaigned on a strong anti-Naxal stance. Naxal groups targeted political workers and leaders, including the killing of TDP MLA P. Purushotham Rao in Sirpur, before the election.

== Schedule ==
The election schedule was announced by the Election Commission of India on 11 July 1999.

Poll event	Date		
Poll event	Phase 1	Phase 2	Phase 3
Notification date	11 August 1999	17 August 1999	21 August 1999
Last date for filing nomination	18 August 1999	24 August 1999	28 August 1999
Scrutiny of nomination	19 August 1999	25 August 1999	30 August 1999
Last Date for withdrawal of nomination	21 August 1999	27 August 1999	1 September 1999
Date of poll	5 September 1999	11 September 1999	18 September 1999
Date of counting of votes	6 October 1999		
No. of constituencies	91	105	98

== Parties and alliances ==
Alliance/Party		Flag	Symbol	Leader	Seats contested	
NDA	Telugu Desam Party			N. Chandrababu Naidu	269	293
NDA	Bharatiya Janata Party			C. Vidyasagar Rao	24	293
Indian National Congress				Y. S. Rajasekhar Reddy	293	
LF	Communist Party of India (Marxist)			B. V. Raghavulu	48	284
LF	Communist Party of India			N. Narsimhaiah Yadav (Note: Due to lack of information the floor leader is being placed.)	45	284
LF	Anna Telugu Desam Party			Nandamuri Harikrishna	191	284
All India Majlis-e-Ittehadul Muslimeen				Akbaruddin Owaisi	5	
NTR Telugu Desam Party (LP)				Lakshmi Parvathi	71	

== Incidents ==
The polling in the naxal effected Narasaraopet was concluded with over 60% of voting. People abstained from voting in two booths at Sarangapalli village in response to a poll boycott given by the Naxalites of the banned Peoples War Group (Maoist).

Another incident of bomb blast took place in the same naxal affected constituency. The polling in the constituency, which was scheduled for the first phase on September 5, was postponed after the bomb blast at the residence-cum-nursing home of Panchayat Raj Minister Kodela Siva Prasada Rao, in which four people including an independent candidate were killed.

== Candidates ==
District	Constituency		NDA		INC	
District	No.	Name	Party	Candidate	Party	Candidate
Srikakulam	1	Ichapuram	TDP	M. V. Krishnarao	INC	Naresh Kumar Agrawal
Srikakulam	2	Sompeta	TDP	Gouthu Syama Sivaji	INC	Majji Sarada
Srikakulam	3	Tekkali	TDP	Korla Revatipathi	INC	Appayyadora Hanumantu
Srikakulam	4	Harishchandra	TDP	Kinjarapu Atchannaidu	INC	Sadhu Ramamohana Rao
Srikakulam	5	Narasannapeta	TDP	Baggu Lakshmana Rao	INC	Dharmana Prasada Rao
Srikakulam	6	Patapatnam	TDP	Kalamata Mohanrao	INC	Gorle Haribabu Naidu
Srikakulam	7	Kothuru (ST)	TDP	Nimmaka Gopala Rao	INC	Viswasarai Narasimharao
Vizianagaram	8	Naguru (ST)	TDP	Nimmaka Jayaraju	INC	Vijayaramaraju Setrucharla
Vizianagaram	9	Parvathipuram	TDP	Dwarapureddy Pratimadevi	INC	Mariserla Sivunnaidu
Vizianagaram	10	Salur (ST)	TDP	R. P. Bhanj Deo	INC	Gummadi Sandhya Rani
Vizianagaram	11	Bobbili	TDP	S. V. China Naidu	INC	Jagan Mohana Rao Peddinti
Vizianagaram	12	Therlam	TDP	Thentu Jayaprakash	INC	Vasireddy Varada Ramarao
Srikakulam	13	Vunukuru	TDP	Kimidi Ganapathi Rao	INC	Palavalasa Rajasekharam
Srikakulam	14	Palakonda (SC)	TDP	Bhadrayya Tale	INC	Kambala Rajaratnam
Srikakulam	15	Amadalavalasa	TDP	Thammineni Seetharam	INC	Satyavathi Boddepalli
Srikakulam	16	Srikakulam	TDP	Gunda Appala Suryanarayana	INC	Challa Ravikumar
Srikakulam	17	Etcherla (SC)	TDP	Kavali Prathibha Bharathi	INC	Kondru Murali Mohan
Vizianagaram	18	Cheepurupalli	TDP	Gadde Babu Rao	INC	Meesala Neelakantam
Vizianagaram	19	Gajapathinagaram	TDP	Gedda Ramachendra Rao	INC	Taddi Sanyasi Naidu
Vizianagaram	20	Vizianagaram	TDP	Ashok Gajapathi Raju	INC	K. Veerabhadra Swamy
Vizianagaram	21	Sathivada	TDP	Suryanarayana Potnuru	INC	Penumatcha Sambasiva Raju
Vizianagaram	22	Bhogapuram	TDP	Pathivada N. Naidu	INC	Kommuru Appala Swamy
Visakhapatnam	23	Bheemunipatnam	TDP	Raja Sagi Devi Prasanna	INC	Sankara Rao Korada
Visakhapatnam	24	Visakhapatnam-I	BJP	Kambhampati Hari Babu	INC	Sabbam Hari
Visakhapatnam	25	Visakhapatnam-II	TDP	Varalakshmi Penninti	INC	Mariadas Yandrapu
Visakhapatnam	26	Pendurthi	TDP	P. G. V. R. Naidu	INC	Dronamraju Srinivasa Rao
Vizianagaram	27	Uttarapalli	TDP	Kolla Appalanaidu	INC	Pudi Mangapathi Rao
Vizianagaram	28	Srungavarapukota (ST)	TDP	Sobha Hymavathi Devi	INC	Ganghadharaswami Setti
Visakhapatnam	29	Paderu (ST)	TDP	Manikumari Matyarasa	INC	Jarsingi Balam Naidu
Visakhapatnam	30	Madugula	TDP	Reddi Satyanarayana	INC	Donda Kannababu
Visakhapatnam	31	Chodavaram	TDP	Gunuru Yerrunaidu	INC	Balireddy Satya Rao
Visakhapatnam	32	Anakapalli	TDP	Dadi Veerabhadra Rao	INC	Konathala Ramakrishna
Visakhapatnam	33	Paravada	TDP	Bandaru S. Murthy	INC	Appalanaidu Paila
Visakhapatnam	34	Elamanchili	TDP	Pappala Chalapathirao	INC	Kanna Babu
Visakhapatnam	35	Payakaraopeta (SC)	TDP	Chengala Venkatarao	INC	Sumana Gantela
Visakhapatnam	36	Narsipatnam	TDP	C. Ayyanna Patrudu	INC	Rajasagi Ramachandra Raju
Visakhapatnam	37	Chintapalli (ST)	TDP	Veeravenkata Satyanarayana	INC	Kankipati Padmakumari
East Godavari	38	Yellavaram (ST)	TDP	S. Venkateswara Rao	INC	Savithri Karam
East Godavari	39	Burugupudi	TDP	Atchamamba Korpu	INC	Appanna Dora Baddireddy
East Godavari	40	Rajahmundry	TDP	Gorantla Butchaiah Ch.	INC	V. Aruna Kumar
East Godavari	41	Kadiam	BJP	G. Venkataswamy Naidu	INC	J. Rammohan Rao
East Godavari	42	Jaggampeta	TDP	Jyothula Nehru	INC	Thota Venkata Chalam
East Godavari	43	Peddapuram	TDP	Boddu Bhaskara Rama Rao	INC	Pantam Gandhi Mohan
East Godavari	44	Prathipadu	TDP	Parvatha Bapanamma	INC	Varupula Subbarao
East Godavari	45	Tuni	TDP	Y. Rama Krishnudu	INC	Koyya Ganga Rao
East Godavari	46	Pithapuram	BJP	Pendem Dorababu	INC	Devarapalli Rajarajeswari
East Godavari	47	Sampara	TDP	Pilli Ananta Lakshmi	INC	T. Satyalinga Naicker
East Godavari	48	Kakinada	TDP	Vanamadi V. Rao	INC	M. M. Pallam Raju
East Godavari	49	Tallarevu	TDP	Chikkala Ramachandra Rao	INC	Kamisetty Satyabala
East Godavari	50	Anaparthy	TDP	Nallamilli Moola Reddy	INC	Tetali Rama Reddy
East Godavari	51	Ramachandrapuram	TDP	Thota Trimurthulu	INC	P. Subhash Chandra Bose
East Godavari	52	Alamuru	TDP	V. V. S. S. Chowdary	INC	Bikkina Krishnarjuna Ch.
East Godavari	53	Mummidivaram (SC)	TDP	Chelli Vivekananda	INC	Pinipe Viswarup
East Godavari	54	Allavaram (SC)	TDP	Chilla Jagadeeswari	Did not contest	
East Godavari	55	Amalapuram	TDP	Metla Satyanarayana Rao	INC	Kudupudi Prabhakara Rao
East Godavari	56	Kothapeta	TDP	Bandaru Satyananda Rao	INC	Swaminaidu Saladi
East Godavari	57	Nagaram (SC)	BJP	Ayyaji Vema Manepalli	INC	Kusuma Krishna Murthy
East Godavari	58	Razole	TDP	Alluri Venkata Surya	INC	Alluru Krishnamraju
West Godavari	59	Narasapur	TDP	Kothapalli Subbarayudu	INC	Kalavakolanu Naga Tulasirao
West Godavari	60	Palacole	TDP	A. V. Satyanarayana	INC	Mentay Padmanabham
West Godavari	61	Achanta (SC)	TDP	Johar Mocharla	INC	Bunga Saradhi
West Godavari	62	Bhimavaram	TDP	P. Venkata Narasimha Raju	INC	Vegiraju Krishnam Raju
West Godavari	63	Undi	TDP	Kalidindi Ramachandra	INC	Gokaraju Ramaraju
West Godavari	64	Penugonda	TDP	Mallula Lakshminarayana	INC	Pithani Satyanarayana
West Godavari	65	Tanuku	TDP	Y. T. Raja	INC	Burugupalli Chinnarao
West Godavari	66	Attili	TDP	Dandu Sivarama Raju	INC	Nookarapu Suryaprakasarao
West Godavari	67	Tadepalligudem	TDP	Yarra Narayanaswamy	INC	Kottu Satyanarayana
West Godavari	68	Ungutur	TDP	Kondreddy Viswanadham	INC	Chava Ramakrishna Rao
West Godavari	69	Dendulur	TDP	Garapati Sambasiva Rao	INC	Kommareddy Madhavarao
West Godavari	70	Eluru	TDP	Ambica Krishna	INC	Alla Nani
West Godavari	71	Gopalpuram (SC)	TDP	Jonnakuti Babaji Rao	INC	Maddala Suneetha
West Godavari	72	Kovvur	TDP	P. Venkata Krishna Rao	INC	G. S. Rao
West Godavari	73	Polavaram (ST)	TDP	Srinivasa Rao Vanka	INC	Badisa Durga Rao
West Godavari	74	Chintalapudi	TDP	Vidyadherarao Kotagiri	INC	Jamunarani Mandalapu
Krishna	75	Jaggayyapet	TDP	Nettem Raghu Ram	INC	Samineni Udayabhanu
Krishna	76	Nandigama	TDP	D. Uma Maheswara Rao	INC	Vasantha Krishna Prasad
Krishna	77	Vijayawada West	TDP	Nagul Meera	INC	Jaleel Khan
Krishna	78	Vijayawada East	BJP	Kota Srinivasa Rao	INC	Ilapuram Venkaiah
Krishna	79	Kankipadu	TDP	Yalamanchili Nageswara Rao	INC	Devineni Nehru
Krishna	80	Mylavaram	TDP	Vadde Sobhanadreeswara Rao	INC	Komati Sudhakararao
Krishna	81	Tiruvuru (SC)	TDP	Nallagatla Swamy Das	INC	Koneru Ranga Rao
Krishna	82	Nuzvid	TDP	Kotagiri Hanumantha Rao	INC	Venkata Rao Paladugu
Krishna	83	Gannavaram	TDP	D. Venkata Balavardhana Rao	INC	Mudraboina Venkateswara
Krishna	84	Vuyyur	TDP	Anne Babu Rao	INC	V. Sobhana Chalapathi Rao
Krishna	85	Gudivada	TDP	Raavi Hari Gopal	INC	Segu Venkateswarlu
Krishna	86	Mudinepalli	TDP	Sita Devi Yerneni	INC	Pinnamaneni Venkateswara
Krishna	87	Kaikalur	TDP	G. Vijaya Nirmala	INC	Namburi Venkata Rama Raju
Krishna	88	Malleswaram	TDP	Kagita Venkata Rao	INC	Buragadda Veda Vyas
Krishna	89	Bandar	TDP	Nadakuditi Narasimha Rao	INC	Perni Nani
Krishna	90	Nidumolu (SC)	TDP	Govada Mariya Kumari	INC	Jaya Raju Penumutcha
Krishna	91	Avanigadda	TDP	Buragadda Ramesh Naidu	INC	Mandali Buddha Prasad
Guntur	92	Kuchinapudi	TDP	Evuru Seetharavamma	INC	M. Venkata Ramana Rao
Guntur	93	Repalle	TDP	Mummaneni Venkata Subbaiah	INC	Ambati Rambabu
Guntur	94	Vemur	TDP	Alapati Rajendra Prasad	INC	Alapati Dharma Rao
Guntur	95	Duggirala	TDP	Kotaru Koteswara Rao	INC	Venkata Reddy Gudibandi
Guntur	96	Tenali	TDP	Uma Gogineni	INC	Konijeti Rosaiah
Guntur	97	Ponnur	TDP	Dhulipalla Narendra Kumar	INC	Chittineni Prathap Babu
Guntur	98	Bapatla	TDP	Anantha Varma Manthena	INC	Seshagiri Rao
Guntur	99	Prathipad	TDP	Peda Rathaiah Makineni	INC	Rayapati Srinivas
Guntur	100	Guntur-I	TDP	S. M. Ziauddin	INC	Mohammed Jani
Guntur	101	Guntur-II	TDP	Sanakkayala Aruna	INC	Eswara Venkata Bharathi
Guntur	102	Mangalagiri	BJP	Raghunadha Babu Yadlapati	INC	Murugudu Hanumantha Rao
Guntur	103	Tadikonda (SC)	TDP	J. R. Pushpa Raju	INC	Kuchipudi Sambasiva Rao
Guntur	104	Sattenapalli	TDP	Yalamanchili Veeranjaneyulu	INC	Chebrolu Hanumaiah
Guntur	105	Peddakurapadu	TDP	Sambasiva Reddy Venna	INC	Kanna Lakshmi Narayana
Guntur	106	Gurzala	TDP	Yarapathineni Srinivasa	INC	Janga Krishna Murthy
Guntur	107	Macherla	TDP	Julakanti Durgamba	INC	Pinnelli Laxma Reddy
Guntur	108	Vinukonda	TDP	Yallamanda Rao Veerapaneni	INC	Makkena Mallikarjuna
Guntur	109	Narasaraopet	TDP	Kodela Siva Prasada Rao	INC	Kasu Krishna Reddy
Guntur	110	Chilakaluripet	TDP	Prathipati Pulla Rao	INC	Somepalli Sambaiah
Prakasam	111	Chirala	TDP	Paleti Ramarao	INC	Anjalee Devi Goli
Prakasam	112	Parchur	TDP	J. Lakshmi Padmavathi	INC	Gade Venkata Reddy
Prakasam	113	Martur	TDP	Gottipati Narasaiah	INC	Narra Seshagirirao
Prakasam	114	Addanki	TDP	Chenchu Garataiah Bachina	INC	Jagarlamudi Raghava Rao
Prakasam	115	Ongole	TDP	Yakkala Tulasi Rao	INC	Balineni Srinivasa Reddy
Prakasam	116	Santhanuthalapadu (SC)	TDP	David Raju Palaparthi	INC	Gurrala Venkata Seshu
Prakasam	117	Kandukur	TDP	Divi Sivaram	INC	Manugunta Maheedhar Reddy
Prakasam	118	Kanigiri	TDP	Mukku Kasi Reddy	INC	Erigineni Thirupathi Naidu
Prakasam	119	Kondepi	TDP	Anjaneyulu Damacharla	INC	Pothula Rama Rao
Prakasam	120	Cumbum	TDP	Chappidi Vengaiah	INC	Kandula Nagarjuna Reddy
Prakasam	121	Darsi	TDP	Vema Venkata Subba Rao	INC	Sanikommu Pitchi Reddy
Prakasam	122	Markapur	TDP	Janke Venkata Reddy	INC	Kunduru Pedda Konda Reddy
Prakasam	123	Giddalur	TDP	Pidathala Vijayakumar Reddy	INC	Pagadala Ramaiah
Nellore	124	Udayagiri	TDP	Kambham Vijayarami Reddy	INC	Mekapati Ch. Reddy
Nellore	125	Kavali	TDP	Vanteru Venugopal Reddy	INC	Yanadi Reddy Kaliki
Nellore	126	Allur	TDP	Adala Prabhakara Reddy	INC	Katamreddy Vishnuvardhan
Nellore	127	Kovur	TDP	N. Prasanna Kumar Reddy	INC	Kodandarami Reddy Jakka
Nellore	128	Atmakur	TDP	Kommi Lakshmaiah Naidu	INC	Bollineni Krishnaiah
Nellore	129	Rapur	TDP	Yellasiri Srinivasulu Reddy	INC	Anam Ramanarayana Reddy
Nellore	130	Nellore	BJP	Narasimha Reddy Dega	INC	Anam Vivekananda Reddy
Nellore	131	Sarvepalli	TDP	S. Chandra Mohan Reddy	INC	C. Venkata Sesha Reddy
Nellore	132	Gudur (SC)	TDP	Balli Durga Prasad Rao	INC	Kondapuram Ramamma
Nellore	133	Sulurpet (SC)	TDP	Parasa Venkata Rathnaiah	INC	Pasala Penchalaiah
Nellore	134	Venkatagiri	TDP	Thadiparthi Sarada	INC	Nedurumalli Rajyalakshmi
Chittoor	135	Sri Kalahasti	TDP	Bojjala Gopala Krishna Reddy	INC	Satravada Muniramaiah
Chittoor	136	Satyavedu (SC)	TDP	Naramalli Sivaprasad	INC	K. Narayana Swamy
Chittoor	137	Nagari	TDP	V. Doraswamy Raju	INC	Chengga Reddy Reddyvari
Chittoor	138	Puttur	TDP	Reddivari Rajasekhar Reddy	INC	Gali Muddu Krishnama Naidu
Chittoor	139	Vepanjeri (SC)	TDP	P. Pushpa Raj	INC	Gummadi Kuthuhalamma
Chittoor	140	Chittoor	TDP	A. S. Manohar	INC	C. K. Jayachandra Reddy
Chittoor	141	Palmaner (SC)	TDP	Patnam Subbaiah	INC	M. Thippeswamy
Chittoor	142	Kuppam	TDP	N. Chandrababu Naidu	INC	M. Subramanya Reddy
Chittoor	143	Punganur	TDP	N. Amarnath Reddy	INC	N. Sreedhar Reddy
Chittoor	144	Madanpalle	TDP	Smt. Ratakonda Shoba	INC	G. Muzeeb Hussain
Chittoor	145	Thamballapalle	BJP	C. Narasimha Reddy	INC	Kadapa Prabhakar Reddy
Chittoor	146	Vayalpad	TDP	C. Ramachandra Reddy	INC	Kiran Kumar Reddy
Chittoor	147	Pileru	TDP	G. V. Sreenatha Reddy	INC	P. Ramachandra Reddy
Chittoor	148	Chandragiri	TDP	Ramamurthy Naidu Nara	INC	Galla Aruna Kumari
Chittoor	149	Tirupathi	TDP	Chadalawada Krishnamurthy	INC	M. Venkataramana
Kadapa	150	Kodur (SC)	TDP	Somineni Saraswati	INC	Gunti Venkateswara Prasad
Kadapa	151	Rajampet	TDP	Brahmaiah Pasupuleti	INC	Konduru Prabhavatamma
Kadapa	152	Rayachoty	TDP	Sugavasi Palakondrayudu	INC	Narayana Reddy Mandipalli
Kadapa	153	Lakkireddipalli	TDP	R. Ramesh Kumar Reddy	INC	Gadikota Mohan Reddy
Kadapa	154	Cuddapah	TDP	S. A. Khaleel Basha	INC	Bandi Hanumanthu
Kadapa	155	Badvel	TDP	B. Veera Reddy	INC	V. Sivarama Krishna Rao
Kadapa	156	Mydukur	TDP	Settipalli Raghurami Reddy	INC	D. L. Ravindra Reddy
Kadapa	157	Proddatur	TDP	Mallela Linga Reddy	INC	N. Varadarajula Reddy
Kadapa	158	Jammalamadugu	TDP	Ponnapureddy Subba Reddy	INC	C. Narayana Reddy
Kadapa	159	Kamalapuram	TDP	Gandluru Veera Siva Reddy	INC	M. V. Mysura Reddy
Kadapa	160	Pulivendla	TDP	Satishkumar Reddy	INC	Y. S. Rajasekhara Reddy
Anantapur	161	Kadiri	BJP	M. S. Partha Sarathi	INC	C. A. Rasool
Anantapur	162	Nallamada	TDP	Palle Raghunatha Reddy	INC	K. Mohan Reddy
Anantapur	163	Gorantla	TDP	Kristappa Nimmala	INC	P. C. Ganganna
Anantapur	164	Hindupur	TDP	C. C. Venkataramudu	INC	K. Thippeswamy
Anantapur	165	Madakasira	TDP	Eregowdu	INC	Raghu Veera Reddy
Anantapur	166	Penukonda	TDP	Paritala Ravindra	INC	Bellam Subramanyam
Anantapur	167	Kalyandrug (SC)	TDP	A. Saradamba	INC	K. B. Shanthi Shivaji
Anantapur	168	Rayadrug	TDP	Pujari Jitendrappa	INC	P. Venugopala Reddy
Anantapur	169	Uravakonda	TDP	Payyavula Keshav	INC	Y. Gari Sivarama Reddy
Anantapur	170	Gooty	TDP	R. Sainath Gowd	INC	Gadi Lingappa
Anantapur	171	Singanamala (SC)	TDP	K. Jayaram	INC	S. Sairam
Anantapur	172	Anantapur	TDP	V. Prabhakar Chowdary	INC	B. Narayana Reddy
Anantapur	173	Dhamavaram	TDP	Gonuguntla Vijaya Kumar	INC	Kethireddy Surya Pratap Reddy
Anantapur	174	Tadpatri	TDP	Peram Nagi Reddy	INC	J. C. Diwakar Reddy
Kurnool	175	Alur (SC)	TDP	Eranna Masala	INC	Moolinti Mareppa
Kurnool	176	Adoni	TDP	K. Meenakshi Naidu	INC	Kotla Jayasurya Reddy
Kurnool	177	Yemmiganur	TDP	B. V. Mohan Reddy	INC	Kesava Reddy
Kurnool	178	Kodumur (SC)	TDP	Y. Jayaraju	INC	M. Sikhamani
Kurnool	179	Kurnool	TDP	T. G. Venkatesh	INC	V. Rama Bhupal Chowdary
Kurnool	180	Pattikonda	TDP	S. V. Subba Reddy	INC	K. Samba Siva Reddy
Kurnool	181	Dhone	TDP	K. E. Prabhakar	INC	R. E. Ravi Kumar
Kurnool	182	Koilkuntla	TDP	Karra Subba Reddy	INC	Challa Ramakrishna Reddy
Kurnool	183	Allagadda	TDP	Bhuma Shobha Nagi Reddy	INC	G. Prathap Reddy
Kurnool	184	Panyam	TDP	Bijjam Partha Sarathi Reddy	INC	K. Rambhupal Reddy
Kurnool	185	Nandikotkur	TDP	Byreddy Rajasekhar Reddy	INC	Gowru Venkata Reddy
Kurnool	186	Nandyal	TDP	N. Md. Farooq	INC	S. Md. Nauman
Kurnool	187	Atmakur	TDP	Budda Seetha Rami Reddy	INC	Erasu Prathap Reddy
Mahabubnagar	188	Achampet (SC)	TDP	Pothuganti Ramulu	INC	C. Krishnaiah
Mahabubnagar	189	Nagarkurnool	TDP	Nagam Janardhan Reddy	INC	Vanga Mohan Goud
Mahabubnagar	190	Kalwakurthi	TDP	Gurka Jaipal Yadav	INC	Yadma Kista Reddy
Mahabubnagar	191	Shadnagar (SC)	BJP	S. Balu	INC	P. Shankar Rao
Mahabubnagar	192	Jadcherla	TDP	M. Chandra Shekar	INC	Mohd. Allaji
Mahabubnagar	193	Mahbubnagar	TDP	Chandra Sekhar	INC	Puli Veeranna
Mahabubnagar	194	Wanaparthy	TDP	Ravula Chandrasekhar Reddy	INC	G. Chinna Reddy
Mahabubnagar	195	Kollapur	TDP	K. Madhusudhan Rao	INC	Jupally Krishna Rao
Mahabubnagar	196	Alampur	BJP	R. Ravindranath Reddy	INC	Kothakota Prakash Reddy
Mahabubnagar	197	Gadwal	TDP	Gattu Bheemudu	INC	D. K. Aruna
Mahabubnagar	198	Amarchinta	TDP	K. Dayakar Reddy	INC	K. Veera Reddy
Mahabubnagar	199	Makthal	TDP	Y. Yella Reddy	INC	Chittem Narsi Reddy
Mahabubnagar	200	Kodangal	TDP	D. Sharada	INC	Gurunath Reddy
Ranga Reddy	201	Tandur	TDP	P. Mahender Reddy	INC	M. Manik Rao
Ranga Reddy	202	Vicarabad (SC)	TDP	A. Chandrasekhar	INC	Madhura Veni
Ranga Reddy	203	Pargi	TDP	Koppula Harishwar Reddy	INC	Kamatham Ram Reddy
Ranga Reddy	204	Chevella	TDP	Kichennagari Laxma Reddy	INC	P. Indra Reddy
Ranga Reddy	205	Ibrahimpatnam (SC)	TDP	K. Pushpaleela	INC	Alturi Gangaram Krishna
Hyderabad	206	Musheerabad	BJP	K. Laxman	INC	M. Kodanda Reddy
Hyderabad	207	Himayatnagar	TDP	C. Krishna Yadav	INC	V. Hanumanta Rao
Hyderabad	208	Sanathnagar	TDP	S. Rajeswar	INC	Marri Shashidhar Reddy
Hyderabad	209	Secunderabad	TDP	Talasani Srinivas Yadav	INC	Mary Ravindranath
Hyderabad	210	Khairatabad	TDP	K. Vijayarama Rao	INC	P. Janardhan Reddy
Hyderabad	211	Secunderabad Cant. (SC)	TDP	G. Sayanna	INC	D. B. Devender
Hyderabad	212	Malakpet	BJP	N. Indrasena Reddy	INC	P. Sudheer Kumar
Hyderabad	213	Asafnagar	TDP	Katragadda Prasuna	INC	Danam Nagender
Hyderabad	214	Maharajgunj	BJP	Prem Singh Rathore	INC	Mukesh Goud
Hyderabad	215	Karwan	BJP	G. Kishan Reddy	INC	Amar Singh
Hyderabad	216	Yakutpura	BJP	G. Hanmanth Rao	INC	Md. Abdul Sami
Hyderabad	217	Chandrayangutta	TDP	Avula Bharath Prakash	INC	G. Anand
Hyderabad	218	Charminar	TDP	Syed Shah Noorul Haqquadri	INC	Manoj Pershad
Ranga Reddy	219	Medchal	TDP	Devender Goud	INC	Singireddy Harivardhan Reddy
Medak	220	Siddipet	TDP	K. Chandrashekar Rao	INC	Mushinam Swamy Charan
Medak	221	Dommat	TDP	Cheruku Muthyam Reddy	INC	Bandi Narsa Goud
Medak	222	Gajwel (SC)	TDP	B. Sanjeeva Rao	INC	J. Geeta Reddy
Medak	223	Narsapur	TDP	Chilumula Madan Reddy	INC	Vakiti Sunitha Reddy
Medak	224	Sangareddy	BJP	K. Satyanarayana	INC	T. Nandeshwar Goud
Medak	225	Zahirabad	TDP	G. Gundappa	INC	Mohammed Fareeduddin
Medak	226	Narayankhed	TDP	M. Vijayapal Reddy	INC	Patlolla Kishta Reddy
Medak	227	Medak	TDP	Karanam Ramachandra Rao	INC	P. J. Vittal Reddy
Medak	228	Ramayampet	TDP	D. Vasudeva Rao	INC	Anthireddigari Vittal Reddy
Medak	229	Andole (SC)	TDP	Babu Mohan	INC	D. Raja Narasimha
Nizamabad	230	Balkonda	TDP	Aloor Ganga Reddy	INC	K. R. Suresh Reddy
Nizamabad	231	Armoor	TDP	Aleti Annapurna Devi	INC	Bajireddy Goverdhan
Nizamabad	232	Kamareddy	TDP	Yousuf Ali	INC	Mohammed Ali Shabbir
Nizamabad	233	Yellareddy	TDP	Nerella Anjaneyulu	INC	B. Janardhan Goud
Nizamabad	234	Jukkal (SC)	TDP	Aruna Thara	INC	D. Rajeshwar Rao
Nizamabad	235	Banswada	TDP	Parige Srinivas Reddy	INC	Kishan Singh
Nizamabad	236	Bodhan	TDP	K. Ramakanth	INC	P. Sudarshan Reddy
Nizamabad	237	Nizamabad	BJP	Endela Lakshminarayana	INC	Dharmapuri Srinivas
Nizamabad	238	Dichpalli	TDP	Mandava V. Rao	INC	Anthareddy Balreddy
Adilabad	239	Mudhole	TDP	Bhosle Narayan Rao Patel	INC	G. Gaddenna
Adilabad	240	Nirmal	TDP	Nalla Indrakaran Reddy	INC	Allola Indrakaran Reddy
Adilabad	241	Boath (ST)	TDP	G. Nagesh	INC	Kodapa Kosu Rao
Adilabad	242	Adilabad	TDP	Padala Bhumanna	INC	Sujatha Gandrath
Adilabad	243	Khanapur (ST)	TDP	Ramesh Rathod	INC	L. Bakshi Naik
Adilabad	244	Asifabad (SC)	TDP	Subhadra Pati	INC	Dasari Narsaiah
Adilabad	245	Luxettipet	TDP	Hanmanth Rao Gone	INC	N. Diwakar Rao
Adilabad	246	Sirpur	TDP	Palvai Rajyalaxmi	INC	Koneru Konappa
Adilabad	247	Chinnur (SC)	TDP	Boda Janardhan	INC	G. Vinod Kumar
Karimnagar	248	Manthani	TDP	Chandrupatla Ram Reddy	INC	D. Sridhar Babu
Karimnagar	249	Peddapalli	BJP	Gujjula Ramakishna Reddy	INC	Geetla Mukunda Reddy
Karimnagar	250	Mydaram (SC)	TDP	Mathangi Narsaiah	INC	Adluri Laxman Kumar
Karimnagar	251	Huzurabad	TDP	E. Peddi Reddy	INC	Saireddy Kethiri
Karimnagar	252	Kamalapur	TDP	Muddasani Damodar Reddy	INC	Arukala Veeresham
Karimnagar	253	Indurthi	BJP	Karra Sreehari	INC	Bomma Venkateshwar
Karimnagar	254	Karimnagar	TDP	Katari Devender Rao	INC	Juvvadi Suresh Rao
Karimnagar	255	Choppadandi	TDP	N. Ramkishan Rao	INC	Koduri Satyanarayana Goud
Karimnagar	256	Jagtial	TDP	L. Ramana	INC	T. Jeevan Reddy
Karimnagar	257	Buggaram	TDP	Amballa Bhagyavathi	INC	Juvvadi Rathnakar Rao
Karimnagar	258	Metpalli	BJP	Thummala Venkata Ramana	INC	Ramlu Komireddi
Karimnagar	259	Sircilla	TDP	C. Rajeshwara Rao	INC	Regulapati Papa Rao
Karimnagar	260	Narella (SC)	TDP	Suddala Devaiah	INC	Gaddam Balaswamy
Warangal	261	Cheriyal	TDP	Mandala Sree Ramulu	INC	Nagapuri Rajalingam
Warangal	262	Jangaon	TDP	Gadipelli Premalatha Reddy	INC	Ponnala Lakshmaiah
Warangal	263	Chennur	TDP	N. Sudhakar Rao	INC	Kunduru Madhusudan Reddy
Warangal	264	Dornakal	TDP	Nookala Naresh Reddy	INC	Dharamsoth Redya Naik
Warangal	265	Mahbubabad	TDP	Sreeram Bhadraiah	INC	Vedavalli Rajavardhan Reddy
Warangal	266	Narsampet	TDP	Revuri Prakash Reddy	INC	Donthi Madhava Reddy
Warangal	267	Wardhannapet	TDP	Errabelli Dayakar Rao	INC	Swarna Errabelli
Warangal	268	Ghanpur	TDP	Kadiyam Srihari	INC	T. Rajaiah
Warangal	269	Warangal	TDP	Donepudi Ramesh Babu	INC	Basavaraju Saraiah
Warangal	270	Hanamkonda	BJP	Marthineni Dharma Rao	INC	P. V. Ranga Rao
Warangal	271	Shyampet	BJP	Devu Sambaiah	INC	Konda Surekha
Warangal	272	Parkal	TDP	Bojjapalli Rajaiah	INC	Pulla Padmavathi
Warangal	273	Mulug	TDP	Azmeera Chandulal	INC	Podem Veeraiah
Khammam	274	Bhadrachalam	TDP	Chichadi Sreeram Murthy	INC	Suseela Dungroth
Khammam	275	Burgampahad	TDP	Thati Venkateswarlu	INC	Lingaiah Chanda
Khammam	276	Kothagudem	TDP	Ayachitam Nagavani	INC	Vanama Venkateswara Rao
Khammam	277	Sathupalli	TDP	Thummala Nageswara Rao	INC	Ponguleti Sudhakar Reddy
Khammam	278	Madhira	TDP	Kondabala Koteswara Rao	INC	Bandaru Anjan Raju
Khammam	279	Palair	TDP	K. V. Ratnam	INC	Sambhani Chandra Sekhar
Khammam	280	Khammam	TDP	Balasani Laxminarayana	INC	Younis Sultan
Khammam	281	Shujatnagar	TDP	Potla Nageswara Rao	INC	Venkatareddy Ramreddy
Khammam	282	Yellandu	Did not contest		INC	Bhukya Dalsingh
Nalgonda	283	Tungaturthi	TDP	Sankineni Venkateswar Rao	INC	Ramreddy Damodar Reddy
Nalgonda	284	Suryapet	TDP	Sudarshan Akarapu	INC	Dosapati Gopal
Nalgonda	285	Kodad	TDP	Chendar Rao Venepalli	INC	N. Uttam Kumar Reddy
Nalgonda	286	Miryalguda	TDP	Aruna Sundari	INC	Repala Srinivas
Nalgonda	287	Chalakurthi	TDP	G. Rammurthy Yadav	INC	Kunduru Jana Reddy
Nalgonda	288	Nakrekal	TDP	Katikam Sathaiah Goud	INC	Baddam Narsimha Reddy
Nalgonda	289	Nalgonda	BJP	Boyapally Krishna Reddy	INC	Komatireddy Venkat Reddy
Nalgonda	290	Ramannapet	TDP	Mothe Peda Soma Reddy	INC	U. Purushotham Reddy
Nalgonda	291	Alair	TDP	Kududula Nagesh	INC	Motkupalli Narasimhulu
Nalgonda	292	Bhongir	TDP	Alimineti Madhava Reddy	INC	Andela Lingam Yadav
Nalgonda	293	Mungode	TDP	Jella Markandeya	INC	Palvai Govardhan Reddy
Nalgonda	294	Deverkonda	TDP	Nenavath Vashya Naik	INC	Ragya Naik

== Results ==
=== Vote share ===
Vote share by party
1. Telugu Desam Party (43.9%)
2. Indian National Congress (40.6%)
3. Bharatiya Janata Party (3.67%)
4. Others (11.8%)

=== Seat share ===
Seat share by party
1. Telugu Desam Party (61.2%)
2. Indian National Congress (30.9%)
3. Bharatiya Janata Party (4.08%)
4. Others (3.74%)

=== Results by party ===
Source: Election Commission of India
Alliance/Party		Popular vote			Seats		
Alliance/Party		Votes	%	±pp	Contested	Won	+/−
NDA	Telugu Desam Party	14,613,307	43.87	▼0.27	269	180	▼36
NDA	Bharatiya Janata Party	1,223,481	3.67	▼0.22	24	12	▲9
NDA	Total	15,836,788	47.54	N/A	293	192	N/A
Indian National Congress		13,526,309	40.61	▲6.76	293	91	▲65
All India Majlis-e-Ittehadul Muslimeen		360,211	1.08	▲0.38	5	4	▲3
LF	Communist Party of India (Marxist)	567,761	1.70	▼1.26	48	2	▼13
LF	Communist Party of India	539,700	1.62	▼1.77	45	0	▼19
LF	Anna Telugu Desam Party	371,718	1.12	new	191	0	new
LF	Total	1,479,179	4.44	N/A	284	2	N/A
Other parties		514,114	1.55	N/A	467	0	N/A
Independents		1,593,015	4.78	▼3.88	762	5	▼7
Total		33,309,616	100.00	N/A	2,104	294	N/A
Vote statistics
Valid votes		33,309,616	97.05				
Invalid votes		1,011,948	2.95				
Votes cast/ turnout		34,334,842	69.15				
Abstentions		15,319,547	30.85				
Registered voters		49,654,389					

=== Results by district ===
District	Seats				
District	Seats	TDP	INC	BJP	OTH
Srikakulam	12	10	1	—N/a	1
Vizianagaram	12	6	6	—N/a	—N/a
Visakhapatnam	13	11	1	1	—N/a
East Godavari	21	18	1	1	1
West Godavari	16	14	1	—N/a	1
Krishna	17	11	4	1	1
Guntur	19	14	5	—N/a	—N/a
Prakasam	13	8	5	—N/a	—N/a
Nellore	11	7	4	—N/a	—N/a
Chittoor	15	6	9	—N/a	—N/a
Kadapa	11	8	3	—N/a	—N/a
Anantapur	14	7	6	1	—N/a
Kurnool	13	10	3	—N/a	—N/a
Mahbubnagar	13	8	4	1	—N/a
Ranga Reddy	6	5	1	—N/a	—N/a
Hyderabad	13	5	1	3	4
Medak	10	5	4	1	—N/a
Nizamabad	9	5	4	—N/a	—N/a
Adilabad	9	6	3	—N/a	—N/a
Karimnagar	13	5	6	2	—N/a
Warangal	13	6	6	1	—N/a
Khammam	9	3	4	—N/a	2
Nalgonda	12	2	9	—N/a	1
Total	294	180	91	12	11

=== Results by region ===
District	Seats				
District	Seats	TDP	INC	BJP	OTH
Kosta Andhra	134	99	28	3	4
Rayalaseema	53	31	25	1	0
Telangana	107	50	38	8	7

=== Results by constituency ===
District	Constituency		Winner			Runner Up			Margin	
District	No.	Name	Candidate	Party	Votes	Candidate	Party	Votes	Margin	
Srikakulam	1	Ichchapuram	M. V. Krishna Rao	TDP	44,633	Naresh Kumar Agarwal	INC	40,290	Margin	4,343
Srikakulam	2	Sompeta	Gouthu Syama Sunder Sivaji	TDP	52,894	Majji Sarada	INC	30,393	22,501	
Srikakulam	3	Tekkali	Korla Revatipathi	TDP	49,012	Appayyadora Hanumantu	INC	42,960	6,052	
Srikakulam	4	Harishchandrapuram	Kinjarapu Atchannaidu	TDP	68,617	Sadhu Ramamohana Rao	INC	29,900	38,717	
Srikakulam	5	Narasannapeta	Dharmana Prasada Rao	INC	48,328	Baggu Lakshmana Rao	TDP	42,558	5,770	
Srikakulam	6	Pathapatnam	Kalamata Mohanrao	TDP	46,599	Gorle Haribabu Naidu	INC	36,044	10,555	
Srikakulam	7	Kothuru (ST)	Gopala Rao Nimmaka	TDP	40,034	Viswasarai Narasimha Rao	INC	38,328	1,706	
Vizianagaram	8	Naguru (ST)	Vijaya Ramaraju Setrucharla	INC	39,726	Nimmaka Jayaraju	TDP	32,809	6,917	
Vizianagaram	9	Parvathipuram	Mariserla Sivunnaidu	INC	49,891	Dwarapureddy Pratima Devi	TDP	35,924	13,967	
Vizianagaram	10	Salur (ST)	R. P. Bhanj Deo	TDP	48,517	Gummidi Sandhya Rani	INC	33,547	14,970	
Vizianagaram	11	Bobbili	Peddinti Jagan Mohana Rao	INC	50,803	Appala Naidu Sambangi Venkata Chinna	TDP	41,491	9,312	
Vizianagaram	12	Therlam	Vasireddy Varada Rama Rao	INC	52,859	Thentu Jayaprakash	TDP	47,376	5,483	
Srikakulam	13	Vunukuru	Kimidi Ganapathi Rao	TDP	57,659	Palavalasa Rajasekharam	INC	46,171	11,488	
Srikakulam	14	Palakonda (SC)	P. J. Amrutha Kumari	IND	24,253	Tale Bhadrayya	TDP	23,057	1,196	
Srikakulam	15	Amadalavalasa	Thammineni Seetharam	TDP	42,543	Boddepalli Satyavathi	INC	41,032	1,511	
Srikakulam	16	Srikakulam	Gunda Appala Suryanarayana	TDP	58,848	Challa Ravi Kumar	INC	47,685	11,163	
Srikakulam	17	Etcherla (SC)	K. Pratibha Bharati	TDP	54,162	Kondru Murali Mohan	INC	43,372	10,790	
Vizianagaram	18	Cheepurupalli	Gadde Babu Rao	TDP	38,089	Meesala Neelakantam	INC	33,438	4,651	
Vizianagaram	19	Gajapathinagaram	Taddi Sanyasi Appala Naidu (Venkata Rao)	INC	36,180	Gedda Ramachendra Rao	TDP	31,233	4,947	
Vizianagaram	20	Vizianagaram	Ashok Gajapathi Raju	TDP	59,692	Kolagatla Veera Bhadra Swamy	INC	50,261	9,431	
Vizianagaram	21	Sathivada	Penumatcha Sambasiva Raju	INC	51,721	Potnuru Suryanarayana	TDP	49,856	1,865	
Vizianagaram	22	Bhogapuram	Pathivada Narayanaswamy Naidu	TDP	48,569	Kommuru Appala Swamy	INC	43,455	5,114	
Visakhapatnam	23	Bheemunipatnam	Rajasagi Devi Prasanna Appala Narasimha Raju	TDP	60,624	Korada Sankara Rao	INC	35,796	24,828	
Visakhapatnam	24	Visakhapatnam-I	Kambhampati Hari Babu	BJP	34,696	Sabbam Hari	INC	26,285	8,411	
Visakhapatnam	25	Visakhapatnam-II	Penninti Varalakshmi	TDP	108,044	Yandrapu Mariadas	INC	77,407	30,637	
Visakhapatnam	26	Pendurthi	Pethakamsetti Gana Venkata Reddy Naidu	TDP	117,411	Dronamraju Srinivasa Rao	INC	93,822	23,589	
Vizianagaram	27	Uttarapalli	Kolla Appalanaidu	TDP	38,951	Pudi Mangapathi Rao	INC	34,684	4,267	
Vizianagaram	28	Srungavarapukota (ST)	Hymavathi Devi Sobha	TDP	46,204	Setti Ganghadhara Swamy	INC	45,526	678	
Visakhapatnam	29	Paderu (ST)	Matyarasa Manikumari	TDP	26,160	Lake Raja Rao	BSP	21,734	4,426	
Visakhapatnam	30	Madugula	Reddi Satyanarayana	TDP	53,407	Donda Kannababu	INC	47,576	5,831	
Visakhapatnam	31	Chodavaram	Balireddy Satya Rao	INC	57,723	Gunuru Yerru Naidu	TDP	52,205	5,518	
Visakhapatnam	32	Anakapalli	Dadi Veerabhadra Rao	TDP	52,750	Konathala Ramakrishna	INC	49,039	3,711	
Visakhapatnam	33	Paravada	Bandaru Satyanarayana Murthy	TDP	66,899	Paila Appalanaidu	INC	43,768	23,131	
Visakhapatnam	34	Elamanchili	Pappala Chalapathi Rao	TDP	52,583	Uppalapati Venkata Ramana Murthy Raju	INC	45,529	7,054	
Visakhapatnam	35	Payakaraopet (SC)	Chengala Venkatarao	TDP	46,478	Gantela Sumana	INC	38,902	7,576	
Visakhapatnam	36	Narsipatnam	Chintakayala Ayyanna Patrudu	TDP	59,853	Rajasagi Ramachandra Raju	INC	51,294	8,559	
Visakhapatnam	37	Chintapalle (ST)	Mottadam Veera Venkata Satyanarayana	TDP	41,163	Goddeti Demudu	CPI	32,892	8,271	
East Godavari	38	Yellavaram (ST)	Seethamsety Venkateswara Rao	TDP	39,229	Karam Savithri	INC	31,222	8,007	
East Godavari	39	Burugupudi	Korpu Atchamamba	TDP	49,930	Baddireddy Appanna Dora	INC	47,955	1,975	
East Godavari	40	Rajahmundry	Gorantla Butchaiah Chowdary	TDP	48,438	Vundavalli Arunakumar	INC	25,411	23,027	
East Godavari	41	Kadiam	Jakkampudi Rammohan Rao	INC	77,726	Girajala Venkataswamy Naidu	BJP	76,922	804	
East Godavari	42	Jaggampeta	Jyothula Venkata Apparao (Nehru)	TDP	63,626	Thota Venkatachalam	INC	53,812	9,814	
East Godavari	43	Peddapuram	Boddu Bhaskara Rama Rao	TDP	55,878	Pantham Gandhi Mohan	INC	50,572	5,306	
East Godavari	44	Prathipadu (East Godavari)	Parvatha Bapanamma	TDP	65,685	Varupula Subbarao	INC	46,159	19,526	
East Godavari	45	Tuni	Yanamala Rama Krishnudu	TDP	52,921	Sri Raja Vatsavayi Venkata Krishnam Raju	IND	48,747	4,174	
East Godavari	46	Pithapuram	Sangisetti Veera Bhadra Rao	IND	36,612	Dorababu Pendem	BJP	32,199	4,413	
East Godavari	47	Sampara	Pilli Anantha Lakshmi	TDP	65,118	Tirumani Satyalinga Naicker	INC	48,039	17,079	
East Godavari	48	Kakinada	Vanamadi Venkateswara Rao (Kondababu)	TDP	49,157	Mallipudi Mangapathi Pallamraj	INC	44,651	4,506	
East Godavari	49	Tallarevu	Chikkala Ramachandra Rao	TDP	48,417	Dommeti Venkateswarlu	IND	45,435	2,982	
East Godavari	50	Anaparthy	Nallamilli Moola Reddy	TDP	47,786	Tetali Rama Reddy	INC	46,800	986	
East Godavari	51	Ramachandrapuram	Thota Thrimurtulu	TDP	46,417	Pilli Subhash Chandra Bose	INC	27,242	19,175	
East Godavari	52	Alamuru	V. V. S. S. Chowdary	TDP	59,979	Bikkina Krishnarjuna Chowdary	INC	45,349	14,630	
East Godavari	53	Mummidivaram (SC)	Chelli Vivekananda	TDP	52,215	Pinipe Viswarup	INC	41,473	10,742	
East Godavari	54	Allavaram (SC)	Chilla Jagadeeswari	TDP	49,345	Aithabathula Jogeswara Venkata Buchi Maheswara Rao	IND	33,399	15,946	
East Godavari	55	Amalapuram	Metla Satyanarayana Rao	TDP	53,246	Kudupudi Prabhakara Rao	INC	34,466	18,780	
East Godavari	56	Kothapeta	Bandaru Satyananda Rao	TDP	42,620	Chirla Soma Sundara Reddi	IND	26,507	16,113	
East Godavari	57	Nagaram (SC)	Manepalli Ayyaji Vema	BJP	42,113	Kusuma Krishna Murthy	INC	25,521	16,592	
East Godavari	58	Razole	Alluri Venkata Surya Narayana Raju	TDP	49,204	Alluru Krishnamraju	INC	48,626	578	
West Godavari	59	Narasapuram	Kothapalli Subbarayudu	TDP	73,160	Kalavakolanu Naga Tulasi Rao	INC	38,431	34,729	
West Godavari	60	Palacole	Allu Venkata Satyanarayana	TDP	47,220	Mentay Padmanabham	INC	35,800	11,420	
West Godavari	61	Achanta (SC)	Johar Mocharla	TDP	52,954	Bunga Saradhi	INC	30,227	22,727	
West Godavari	62	Bhimavaram	Penmetsa Venkata Narasimha Raju	TDP	71,502	Vegiraju Rama Krishnam Raju	INC	39,648	31,854	
West Godavari	63	Undi	Kalidindi Ramachandra Raju	TDP	47,175	Gokaraju Ramaraju	INC	32,561	14,614	
West Godavari	64	Penugonda	Kunapareddy Veera Raghavendra Rao	IND	35,838	Pithani Satyanarayana	INC	29,221	6,617	
West Godavari	65	Tanuku	Y. T. Raja	TDP	70,574	Burugupalli Chinnarao	INC	46,727	23,847	
West Godavari	66	Attili	Dandu Sivarama Raju	TDP	60,868	Nookarapu Suryaprakasarao	INC	36,179	24,689	
West Godavari	67	Tadepalligudem	Yarra Narayanaswamy	TDP	60,666	Kottu Satyanarayana	INC	50,175	10,491	
West Godavari	68	Ungutur	Kondreddy Viswanadham	TDP	66,566	Chava Ramakrishna Rao	INC	63,264	3,302	
West Godavari	69	Dendulur	Garapati Sambasiva Rao	TDP	59,967	Kommareddy Madhavarao	INC	51,230	8,737	
West Godavari	70	Eluru	P. V. V. P. Krishna Rao (Ambica Krishna)	TDP	59,678	Alla Kali Krishna Srinivas (Alla Nani)	INC	52,363	7,315	
West Godavari	71	Gopalpuram (SC)	Jonnakuti Babaji Rao	TDP	57,538	Maddala Suneetha	INC	54,552	2,986	
West Godavari	72	Kovvur	G. S. Rao	INC	63,721	Pendyala Venkata Krishna Rao	TDP	57,185	6,536	
West Godavari	73	Polavaram (ST)	Vanka Srinivasa Rao	TDP	47,796	Badisa Durga Rao	INC	47,772	24	
West Godavari	74	Chintalapudi	Kotagiri Vidyadhara Rao	TDP	76,251	Mandalapu Jamunarani	INC	44,361	31,890	
Krishna	75	Jaggayyapet	Samineni Udaya Bhanu	INC	60,877	Nettem Raghu Ram	TDP	53,406	7,471	
Krishna	76	Nandigama	Devineni Uma Maheswara Rao	TDP	65,673	Vasantha Venkata Krishna Prasad	INC	42,162	23,511	
Krishna	77	Vijayawada West	Jaleel Khan	INC	52,837	Nagul Meera	TDP	49,729	3,108	
Krishna	78	Vijayawada East	Kota Srinivasa Rao	BJP	57,047	Ilapuram Venkaiah	INC	50,971	6,076	
Krishna	79	Kankipadu	Yalamanchili Nageswara Rao	TDP	97,317	Raja Sekhar (Nehru) Devineni	INC	82,975	14,342	
Krishna	80	Mylavaram	Vadde Sobhanadreeswara Rao	TDP	65,085	Komati Sudhakara Rao	INC	56,170	8,915	
Krishna	81	Tiruvuru (SC)	Nallagatla Swamy Das	TDP	61206	Koneru Ranga Rao	INC	60,123	1,083	
Krishna	82	Nuzvid	Kotagiri Hanumantha Rao	TDP	46,139	Paladugu Venkata Rao	INC	42,670	3,469	
Krishna	83	Gannavaram	Dasari Venkata Balavardhana Rao	TDP	49,563	Mudraboina Venkateswara Rao	INC	27,763	21,800	
Krishna	84	Vuyyur	Anne Babu Rao	TDP	33,328	Chalasani Venkateswararao (Pandu)	IND	32,308	1,020	
Krishna	85	Gudivada	Raavi Hari Gopal	TDP	43,126	Segu Venkateswarlu	INC	26,180	16,946	
Krishna	86	Mudinepalli	Pinnamaneni Venkateswara Rao	INC	44,138	Yerneni Sita Devi	TDP	41,827	2,311	
Krishna	87	Kaikalur	Yerneni Raja Rama Chandar (Raja Babu)	IND	36,618	Vijaya Nirmala	TDP	35,509	1,109	
Krishna	88	Malleswaram	Kagita Venkata Rao	TDP	49,310	Uragadda Veda Vyas	INC	48,641	669	
Krishna	89	Bandar	Nadakuditi Narasimha Rao	TDP	60,022	Perni Venkatramaiah (Nani)	INC	44,495	15,527	
Krishna	90	Nidumolu (SC)	Govada Mariya Kumari	TDP	37,092	Penumutcha Jaya Raju	INC	19,322	17,770	
Krishna	91	Avanigadda	Mandali Buddha Prasad	INC	41,919	Buragadda Ramesh Naidu	TDP	41,125	794	
Guntur	92	Kuchinapudi	Mopidevi Venkata Ramana Rao	INC	45,963	Evuru Seetharavamma	TDP	36,802	9,161	
Guntur	93	Repalle	Mummaneni Venkata Subbaiah	TDP	46,566	Ambati Rambabu	INC	25,799	20,767	
Guntur	94	Vemuru	Alapati Rajendra Prasad	TDP	56,523	Alapati Dharma Rao	INC	37,576	18,674	
Guntur	95	Duggirala	Gudibandi Venkata Reddy	INC	46,714	Kotaru Koteswara Rao	TDP	46,202	512	
Guntur	96	Tenali	Gogineni Uma	TDP	51,399	Konijeti Rosaiah	INC	46,005	5,394	
Guntur	97	Ponnur	Dhulipalla Narendra Kumar	TDP	54,866	Chettineni Prathap Babu	INC	39,332	15,533	
Guntur	98	Bapatla	Manthena Anantha Varma	TDP	50,008	Muppalaneni Seshagiri Rao	INC	36,163	13,845	
Guntur	99	Prathipadu (Guntur)	Makineni Peda Rathaiah	TDP	52,038	Rayapati Srinivas	INC	40,468	11,570	
Guntur	100	Guntur-I	S. M. Ziauddin	TDP	56,439	Mohammed Jani	INC	50,342	6,097	
Guntur	101	Guntur-II	Sanakkayala Aruna	TDP	55,612	Eswara Venkata Bharathi Kosanam	INC	49,298	6,314	
Guntur	102	Mangalagiri	Murugudu Hanumantha Rao	INC	41,714	Ramamohana Rao Nimmagadda	CPI(M)	29,690	12,024	
Guntur	103	Tadikonda (SC)	J. R. Pushpa Raju	TDP	51,568	Kuchipudi Sambasiva Rao	INC	46,423	5,145	
Guntur	104	Sattenapalli	Yalamanchili Veeranjaneyulu	TDP	60,232	Chebrolu Hanumaiah	INC	49,539	10,693	
Guntur	105	Peddakurapadu	Kanna Lakshminarayana	INC	62,197	Sambasiva Reddy Venna	TDP	59,349	2,848	
Guntur	106	Gurzala	Janga Krishna Murthy	INC	64,035	Yarapathineni Srinivasarao	TDP	63,904	131	
Guntur	107	Macherla	Julakanti Durgamba	TDP	54,128	Pinnelli Laxma Reddy	INC	52,177	1,951	
Guntur	108	Vinukonda	Veerapaneni Yallamanda Rao	TDP	61,939	Makkena Mallikarjunarao	INC	61,098	841	
Guntur	109	Narasaraopet	Kodela Siva Prasada Rao	TDP	74,089	Kasu Venkata Krishna Reddy	INC	59,783	14,306	
Guntur	110	Chilakaluripet	Prathipati Pulla Rao	TDP	68,708	Somepalli Sambaiah	INC	42,467	26,241	
Prakasam	111	Chirala	Paleti Rama Rao	TDP	60,806	Anjalee Devi Goli	INC	47,298	13,508	
Prakasam	112	Parchur	Jagarlamudi Lakshmi Padmavathi	TDP	48,574	Gade Venkata Reddy	INC	46,365	2,209	
Prakasam	113	Martur	Gottipati Narasaiah	TDP	73,422	Narra Seshagiri Rao	INC	33,763	39,659	
Prakasam	114	Addanki	Bachina Chenchu Garataiah	TDP	53,670	Jagarlamudi Raghava Rao	INC	53,421	249	
Prakasam	115	Ongole	Balineni Srinivasa Reddy	INC	44,707	Yakkala Tulasi Rao	TDP	38,485	6,222	
Prakasam	116	Santhanuthalapadu (SC)	Palaparthi David Raju	TDP	56,543	Gurrala Venkata Seshu	INC	46,192	10,351	
Prakasam	117	Kandukur	Divi Sivaram	TDP	63,964	Manugunta Maheedhar Reddy	INC	62,439	1,525	
Prakasam	118	Kanigiri	Erigineni Thirupathi Naidu	INC	52,566	Mukku Kasi Reddy	TDP	47,412	5,154	
Prakasam	119	Kondepi	Damacharla Anjaneyulu	TDP	61,824	Pothula Rama Rao	INC	50,872	10,952	
Prakasam	120	Cumbum	Kandula Nagarjuna Reddy	INC	59,615	Chappidi Vengaiah	TDP	39,717	19,898	
Prakasam	121	Darsi	Sanikommu Pitchi Reddy	INC	70,387	Vema Venkata Subba Rao	TDP	57,209	13,178	
Prakasam	122	Markapur	Kunduru Pedda Konda Reddy	INC	62,625	Janke Venkata Reddy	TDP	56,504	6,122	
Prakasam	123	Giddalur	Pidathala Vijaya Kumar Reddy	TDP	38,136	Pagadala Ramaiah	INC	34,954	3,182	
Nellore	124	Udayagiri	Kambham Vijayarami Reddy	TDP	43,995	Mekapati Chandrasekhar Reddy	INC	39,220	4,775	
Nellore	125	Kavali	Vanteru Venugopal Reddy	TDP	63,630	Kaliki Yanadi Reddy	INC	45,185	18,445	
Nellore	126	Allur	Adala Prabhakar Reddy	TDP	50,829	Katamreddy Vishnuvardhan Reddy	INC	45,946	4,883	
Nellore	127	Kovur	Nallapareddy Prasanna Kumar Reddy	TDP	59,981	Jakka Kodandarami Reddy	INC	31,374	28,607	
Nellore	128	Atmakur (Nellore)	Bollineni Krishnaiah	INC	55,249	Kommi Lakshmaiah Naidu	TDP	53,180	2,069	
Nellore	129	Rapur	Anam Ramanarayana Reddy	INC	59,127	Yellasiri Srinivasulu Reddy	TDP	52,999	6,128	
Nellore	130	Nellore	Anam Vivekananda Reddy	INC	51,724	Dega Narasimha Reddy	BJP	46,068	5,656	
Nellore	131	Sarvepalli	Somireddy Chandra Mohan Reddy	TDP	61,578	Chittooru Venkata Sesha Reddy	INC	45,486	16,092	
Nellore	132	Gudur (SC)	Balli Durgaprasad Rao	TDP	55,707	Kondapuram Ramamma	INC	45,937	9,770	
Nellore	133	Sulurpet (SC)	Parasa Venkata Rathnaiah	TDP	55,606	Pasala Penchalaiah	INC	45,611	9,995	
Nellore	134	Venkatagiri	Nedurumalli Rajyalakshmi	INC	48,876	Sarada Thadiparthi	TDP	38,158	10,718	
Chittoor	135	Srikalahasti	Bojjala Gopala Krishna Reddy	TDP	61,017	Satravada Muniramaiah	INC	52,606	8,411	
Chittoor	136	Satyavedu (SC)	Naramalli Sivaprasad	TDP	54,686	Kalathur Narayana Swamy	INC	48,027	6,659	
Chittoor	137	Nagari	Reddyvari Chenga Reddy	INC	62,592	V. Doraswamy Raju	TDP	59,478	3,114	
Chittoor	138	Puttur	Reddivari Rajasekhar Reddy	TDP	53,152	Gali Muddukrishnama Naidu	INC	46,387	6,765	
Chittoor	139	Vepanjeri (SC)	Gummadi Kuthuhalam	INC	60,760	P. Pushpa Raj	TDP	47,554	13,206	
Chittoor	140	Chittoor	C. K. Jayachandra Reddy	INC	62,999	A. S. Manohar	TDP	48,702	14,297	
Chittoor	141	Palmaner (SC)	M. Thippeswamy	INC	62,834	Patnam Subbaiah	TDP	59,241	3,593	
Chittoor	142	Kuppam	N. Chandrababu Naidu	TDP	93,288	M. Subramanya Reddy	INC	27,601	65,687	
Chittoor	143	Punganur	N. Sreedhar Reddy	INC	65,441	N. Amaranatha Reddy	TDP	59,695	5,746	
Chittoor	144	Madanpalle	Ratakonda Shoba	TDP	54,931	G. Muzeeb Hussain	INC	36,414	18,517	
Chittoor	145	Thamballapalle	Kadapa Prabhakar Reddy	INC	51,030	C. Narasimha Reddy	BJP	41,136	9,894	
Chittoor	146	Vayalpad	Kiran Kumar Reddy	INC	49,973	Chintala Ramachandra Reddy	TDP	49,284	689	
Chittoor	147	Pileru	Peddireddy Ramachandra Reddy	INC	62,562	G. V. Sreenatha Reddy	TDP	49,129	13,433	
Chittoor	148	Chandragiri	Galla Aruna Kumari	INC	57,915	Nara Ramamurthy Naidu	TDP	55,644	2,271	
Chittoor	149	Tirupathi	Chadalavada Krishna Murthy	TDP	71,381	M. Venkataramana	INC	58,299	13,082	
Kadapa	150	Kodur (SC)	Somineni Saraswati	TDP	38,228	Gunti Venkateswara Prasad	INC	27,986	10,242	
Kadapa	151	Rajampet	Pasupuleti Brahmaiah	TDP	28,184	Konduru Prabhavathamma	INC	27,495	689	
Kadapa	152	Rayachoti	Sugavasi Palakondrayudu	TDP	51,044	Mandipalli Narayana Reddy	INC	42,234	8810	
Kadapa	153	Lakkireddipalli	Reddeppagari Ramesh Kumar Reddy	TDP	46,787	Gadikota Mohan Reddy	INC	36,642	10,145	
Kadapa	154	Cuddapa	S. A. Khaleel Basha	TDP	60,110	Bandi Hanumanthu	INC	52,344	7,766	
Kadapa	155	Badvel	Bijivemula Veera Reddy	TDP	51,136	V. Sivarama Krishna Rao	INC	41,155	9,981	
Kadapa	156	Mydukur	Settipalle Raghurami Reddy	TDP	48,135	D. L. Ravindra Reddy	INC	42,615	5,520	
Kadapa	157	Proddatur	Nandyala Varadarajula Reddy	INC	46,740	Mallela Linga Reddy	TDP	44,605	2,135	
Kadapa	158	Jammalamadugu	Ponnapureddy Rama Subba Reddy	TDP	48,912	Chadipiralla Narayana Reddy	INC	48,555	357	
Kadapa	159	Kamalapuram	Mule Venkata Mysura Reddy	INC	52,429	Gandluru Veera Siva Reddy	TDP	41,898	10,531	
Kadapa	160	Pulivendla	Y. S. Rajasekhara Reddy	INC	62,019	Singareddy Satishkumar Reddy	TDP	32,010	30,009	
Anantapur	161	Kadiri	M. S. Parthasarathi	BJP	56,686	C. A. Rasool	INC	46,916	9,770	
Anantapur	162	Nallamada	Palle Raghunatha Reddy	TDP	44,942	K. Mohan Reddy	INC	32,945	11,997	
Anantapur	163	Gorantla	Nimmala Kristappa	TDP	54,971	Pamudurthi Ravindra Reddy	IND	23,784	31,187	
Anantapur	164	Hindupur	C. C. Venkataramudu	TDP	79,720	K. Thippe Swamy	INC	41,329	38,391	
Anantapur	165	Madakasira	Raghu Veera Reddy	INC	74,386	Eregowdu	TDP	46,820	27,566	
Anantapur	166	Penukonda	Paritala Ravindra	TDP	71,695	Bellam Subramanyam	INC	13,818	57,877	
Anantapur	167	Kalyandrug (SC)	A. Saradamba	TDP	67,813	K. B. Shanthi Shivaji	INC	44,931	22,882	
Anantapur	168	Rayadrug	P. Venugopala Reddy	INC	59,086	Pujari Jitendrappa	TDP	49,851	9,235	
Anantapur	169	Uravakonda	Yellareddy Gari Sivarama Reddy	INC	54,063	Payyavula Keshav	TDP	45,562	8,501	
Anantapur	170	Gooty	R. Sainath Gowd	TDP	59,410	Gadi Lingappa	INC	24,946	34,464	
Anantapur	171	Singanamala (SC)	K. Jayaram	TDP	47,310	S. Sairam	INC	43,020	4,290	
Anantapur	172	Anantapur	B. Narayana Reddy	INC	60,116	V. Prabhakara Chowdary	TDP	60,116	3,465	
Anantapur	173	Dhamavaram	Kethireddy Surya Pratap Reddy	INC	60,690	Gonuguntla Vijaya Kumar	TDP	52,030	8,660	
Anantapur	174	Tadpatri	J. C. Diwakar Reddy	INC	51,509	Peram Nagi Reddy	TDP	47,466	4,043	
Kurnool	175	Alur (SC)	Moolinti Mareppa	INC	42,763	Eranna Masala	TDP	33,099	9,664	
Kurnool	176	Adoni	K. Meenakshi Naidu	TDP	56,527	Kotla Jaya Surya Prakash Reddy	INC	42,099	14,428	
Kurnool	177	Yemmiganur	B. V. Mohan Reddy	TDP	71,827	Kesava Reddy	INC	55,310	16,517	
Kurnool	178	Kodumur (SC)	M. Sikhamani	INC	56,127	Y. Jayaraju	TDP	40,246	15,881	
Kurnool	179	Kurnool	T. G. Venkatesh	TDP	56,543	V. Rama Bhupal Chowdary	INC	42,068	14,475	
Kurnool	180	Pattikonda	S. V. Subba Reddy	TDP	52,199	K. Samba Siva Reddy	INC	35,642	16,557	
Kurnool	181	Dhone	K. E. Prabhakar	TDP	70,785	R. E. Ravi Kumar	INC	34,358	36,427	
Kurnool	182	Koilkuntla	Challa Ramakrishna Reddy	INC	61,124	Karra Subba Reddy	TDP	40,039	21,085	
Kurnool	183	Allagadda	Shobha Nagi Reddy	TDP	60,352	Gangula Prabhakar Reddy	INC	46,693	13,659	
Kurnool	184	Panyam	Bijjam Partha Sarathi Reddy	TDP	63,333	Katasani Rama Bhupal Reddy	INC	42,087	21,246	
Kurnool	185	Nandikotkur	Byreddy Rajasekhara Reddy	TDP	58,874	Gowru Venkata Reddy	INC	44,672	14,202	
Kurnool	186	Nandyal	Nasyam Mohammed Farooq	TDP	44,120	S. P. Y. Reddy	IND	40,295	3,825	
Kurnool	187	Atmakur (Kurnool)	Budda Seetha Rami Reddy	TDP	63,391	Erasu Prathap Reddy	INC	44,353	19,038	
Mahabubnagar	188	Achampet (SC)	P. Ramulu	TDP	60,878	C. Krishnaiah	INC	48,532	12,346	
Mahabubnagar	189	Nagarkurnool	Nagam Janardhan Reddy	TDP	61,964	Kuchakulla Damodhar Reddy	IND	30,498	31,466	
Mahabubnagar	190	Kalwakurthy	G. Jaipal Yadav	TDP	63,995	Yadma Kista Reddy	INC	60,592	3,403	
Mahabubnagar	191	Shadnagar (SC)	P. Shanker Rao	INC	56,195	S. Balu	BJP	50,185	6,010	
Mahabubnagar	192	Jadcherla	M. Chandra Shekar	TDP	49,450	Mohd. Allaji	INC	24,808	24,642	
Mahabubnagar	193	Mahbubnagar	Chandra Sekhar	TDP	51,065	Puli Veeranna	INC	44,377	6,688	
Mahabubnagar	194	Wanaparthy	G. Chinna Reddy	INC	65,286	Ravula Chandra Sekar Reddy	TDP	61,933	3,353	
Mahabubnagar	195	Kollapur	Jupally Krishna Rao	INC	54677	K. Madhusudhan Rao	TDP	49,372	5,305	
Mahabubnagar	196	Alampur	Ravula Ravindranath Reddy	BJP	53,588	Kothakota Prakash Reddy	INC	23,334	30,254	
Mahabubnagar	197	Gadwal	Ghattu Bheemudu	TDP	47,807	D. K. Aruna	INC	43,261	4,546	
Mahabubnagar	198	Amarchinta	K. Dayakar Reddy	TDP	69,786	K. Veera Reddy	INC	47,479	22,307	
Mahabubnagar	199	Makthal	Y. Yella Reddy	TDP	55,404	Chittem Narsi Reddy	INC	42,841	12,563	
Mahabubnagar	200	Kodangal	Gurunath Reddy	INC	59,624	D. Sharada	TDP	45,922	13,702	
Ranga Reddy	201	Tandur	P. Mahender Reddy	TDP	62,610	M. Manik Rao	INC	49,649	12,961	
Ranga Reddy	202	Vikarabad (SC)	A. Chandrasekhar	TDP	52,733	Madhura Veni	INC	52,530	203	
Ranga Reddy	203	Pargi	Koppula Harishwar Reddy	TDP	60,360	Kamatham Ram Reddy	INC	51,744	8,616	
Ranga Reddy	204	Chevella	P. Indra Reddy	INC	73,258	Kichennagari Laxma Reddy	TDP	63,299	9,959	
Ranga Reddy	205	Ibrahimpatnam (SC)	Kondru Pushpa Leela	TDP	51,507	Alturi Gangaram Krishna	INC	45,175	6,332	
Hyderabad	206	Musheerabad	K. Laxman	BJP	71,413	M. Kodanda Reddy	INC	52,846	18,567	
Hyderabad	207	Himayatnagar	C. Krishna Yadav	TDP	73,530	V. Hanumanta Rao	INC	43,428	30,102	
Hyderabad	208	Sanathnagar	S. Rajeswar	TDP	59,568	Marri Shashidhar Reddy	INC	43,537	16,031	
Hyderabad	209	Secunderabad	Talasani Srinivas Yadav	TDP	79,130	Mary Ravindranath	INC	41,607	37,523	
Hyderabad	210	Khairatabad	K. Vijayarama Rao	TDP	159,018	P. Janardhana Reddy	INC	148,641	10,377	
Hyderabad	211	Secunderabad Cantt. (SC)	G. Sayanna	TDP	95,227	D. B. Devender	INC	65,286	29,941	
Hyderabad	212	Malakpet	N. Indrasena Reddy	BJP	118,937	Sudheer Kumar P	INC	69,617	49,320	
Hyderabad	213	Asifnagar	Danam Nagender	INC	42,822	Mohammed Virasat Rasool Khan	AIMIM	22,102	20,720	
Hyderabad	214	Maharajgunj	Prem Singh Rathore	BJP	33,969	M. Mukesh	INC	30,553	3,416	
Hyderabad	215	Karwan	Syed Sajjad	AIMIM	78,325	G. Kishan Reddy	BJP	64,783	13,542	
Hyderabad	216	Yakutpura	Mumtaz Ahmed Khan	AIMIM	66,283	Majidullah Khan (Farhatullah Khan)	MBT	34,951	31,332	
Hyderabad	217	Chandrayangutta	Akbaruddin Owaisi	AIMIM	66,657	Md. Amanullah Khan	MBT	54,737	11,920	
Hyderabad	218	Charminar	Asaduddin Owaisi	AIMIM	126,844	Syed Shah Noorul Haqquadri	TDP	33,339	93,505	
Ranga Reddy	219	Medchal	T. Devender Goud	TDP	193,731	Singireddy Harivardhan Reddy	INC	115,848	77,883	
Medak	220	Siddipet	K. Chandra Shakher Rao	TDP	69,169	Mushinam Swamy Charan	INC	41,614	27,555	
Medak	221	Dommat	Cheruku Muthyam Reddy	TDP	61,734	Bandi Narsa Goud	INC	30,249	31,485	
Medak	222	Gajwel (SC)	B. Sanjeeva Rao	TDP	57,335	J. Geetha	INC	54,908	2,427	
Medak	223	Narsapur	Vakiti Suneetha Reddy	INC	41,376	Chilumula Vittal Reddy	CPI	36,337	5,039	
Medak	224	Sangareddy	K. Satyanarayana	BJP	70,522	T. Nandeshwar Goud	INC	53,078	17,444	
Medak	225	Zahirabad	Fareeduddin	INC	46,478	G. Gundappa	TDP	39,290	7,188	
Medak	226	Narayankhed	Patlola Kista Reddy	INC	63,162	M. Vijayapal Reddy	TDP	55,605	7,557	
Medak	227	Medak	Karanam Ramachandra Rao	TDP	61,216	P. J. Vittal Reddy	INC	41,048	20,168	
Medak	228	Ramayampet	Anthireddigari Vittal Reddy	INC	54,432	D. Vasudeva Rao	TDP	52,961	1,471	
Medak	229	Andole (SC)	Babu Mohan	TDP	51,215	C. Damoder Rajanarsimha	INC	50,702	513	
Nizamabad	230	Balkonda	K. R. Suresh Reddy	INC	54,182	Aloor Ganga Reddy	TDP	42,935	11,247	
Nizamabad	231	Armur	Bajireddy Goverdhan	INC	72,378	Aleti Annapoorna	TDP	48,705	23,673	
Nizamabad	232	Kamareddy	Yousuf Ali	TDP	63,949	Mohammed Ali Shabbeer	INC	60,178	3,771	
Nizamabad	233	Yellareddy	Neralla Anjaneyulu	TDP	44,814	Janardhan Goud Bogudameedi	INC	43,497	1,317	
Nizamabad	234	Jukkal (SC)	Thara Aruna	TDP	39,556	S. Gangaram	IND	29,402	10,154	
Nizamabad	235	Banswada	Parige Srinivas Reddy	TDP	72,179	Kishan Singh	INC	40,495	31,684	
Nizamabad	236	Bodhan	P. Sudarshan Reddy	INC	54,234	K. Ramakanth	TDP	44,945	9,289	
Nizamabad	237	Nizamabad	D. Srinivas	INC	63,142	Yendala Laxmi Narayana	BJP	50,392	12,750	
Nizamabad	238	Dichpalli	Mandava Venkateshwara Rao	TDP	51,641	Anthareddy Balreddy	INC	47,355	4,286	
Adilabad	239	Mudhole	G. Gaddenna	INC	57,193	Bhosle Narayan Rao Patel	TDP	56,343	850	
Adilabad	240	Nirmal	Allola Indrakaran Reddy	INC	62,523	Nalla Indrakaran Reddy	TDP	47,477	15,046	
Adilabad	241	Boath (ST)	Godam Nagesh	TDP	49,155	Kodapa Kosu Rao	INC	29,420	19,735	
Adilabad	242	Adilabad	Padala Bhumanna	TDP	65,054	Chilkuri Ramchandar Reddy	IND	29,828	35,226	
Adilabad	243	Khanapur (ST)	Rathod Ramesh	TDP	50,892	L. Bakshi Naik	INC	30,876	20,016	
Adilabad	244	Asifabad (SC)	Pati Subhadra	TDP	50,341	Dasari Narsaiah	INC	38,948	11,393	
Adilabad	245	Luxettipet	N. Divakar Rao	INC	76,581	Gone Hanmanth Rao	TDP	63,348	13,233	
Adilabad	246	Sirpur	Palvai Rajyalaxmi	TDP	57,318	Koneru Konappa	INC	27,351	29,967	
Adilabad	247	Chennur (SC)	Boda Janardhan	TDP	47,764	G. Vinod	INC	40,544	7,220	
Karimnagar	248	Manthani	D. Sridhar Babu	INC	65,884	Chandrupatla Ram Reddy	TDP	50,613	15,271	
Karimnagar	249	Peddapalle	Gujjula Ramakishna Reddy	BJP	56,099	Geetla Mukunda Reddy	INC	45,986	10,113	
Karimnagar	250	Mydaram (SC)	Mathangi Narsaiah	TDP	82,940	Adluri Laxman Kumar	INC	54,012	28,928	
Karimnagar	251	Huzurabad	Enugala Peddi Reddy	TDP	45,200	Kethiri Saireddy	INC	45,200	6,430	
Karimnagar	252	Kamalapur	Muddasani Damodar Reddy	TDP	61,402	Arukala Veeresham	INC	45,310	16,092	
Karimnagar	253	Indurthi	Bomma Venkateshwar	INC	34,268	Karra Sreehari	BJP	23,792	10,476	
Karimnagar	254	Karimnagar	Katari Devender Rao	TDP	58,741	Velichala Jagapathi Rao	IND	34,429	24,312	
Karimnagar	255	Choppadandi	Koduri Satyanarayana Goud	INC	54,754	N. Ramkishan Rao	TDP	52,842	1,912	
Karimnagar	256	Jagtial	T. Jeevan Reddy	INC	65,486	L. Ramana	TDP	48,574	16,912	
Karimnagar	257	Buggaram	Juvvadi Rathnakar Rao	INC	63,383	Amballa Bhagyavathi	TDP	48,003	15,380	
Karimnagar	258	Metpalli	Thummala Venkata Ramana Reddy	BJP	56,160	Komireddi Ramulu	INC	44,637	11,523	
Karimnagar	259	Sircilla	Regulapati Papa Rao	INC	58,638	Chennamaneni Rajeshwar Rao	TDP	48,986	9,652	
Karimnagar	260	Narella (SC)	Suddala Devaiah	TDP	70,559	Gaddam Balaswamy	INC	30,220	40,339	
Warangal	261	Cheriyal	Nagapuri Rajalingam	INC	44107	Mandala Sree Ramulu	TDP	42,447	1,660	
Warangal	262	Jangaon	Ponnala Lakshmaiah	INC	47136	Gadipelli Premalatha Reddy	TDP	36,253	10,883	
Warangal	263	Chennur	Nemarugommula Sudhakar Rao	TDP	61,087	Kunduru Madhusudan Reddy	INC	56,759	4,328	
Warangal	264	Dornakal	Dharamsoth Redya Naik	INC	56,339	Nookala Naresh Reddy	TDP	48,303	8,036	
Warangal	265	Mahbubabad	Bhadraiah Sreeram	TDP	46,538	Vedavalli Rajavardhan Reddy	INC	34,110	12,428	
Warangal	266	Narsampet	Revuri Prakasha Reddy	TDP	61,349	Donti Madhava Reddy	INC	47,764	13,585	
Warangal	267	Waradhanapet	Errabelli Dayakar Rao	TDP	62,581	Errabelli Swarna	INC	50,998	11,583	
Warangal	268	Ghanpur Station (SC)	Kadiyam Srihari	TDP	50,080	T. Rajaiah	INC	45,520	4,560	
Warangal	269	Warangal	Baswaraj Saraiah	INC	56,076	Donepudi Ramesh Babu	TDP	46,825	9,251	
Warangal	270	Hanamkonda	Marthineni Dharma Rao	BJP	52,572	P. V. Ranga Rao	INC	38,488	14,084	
Warangal	271	Shyampet	Konda Surekha	INC	43,384	Devu Sambaiah	BJP	42,813	571	
Warangal	272	Parkal (SC)	Bojjapalli Rajaiah	TDP	48,296	Pulla Padmavathi	INC	33,202	15,094	
Warangal	273	Mulug (ST)	Podem Veeraiah	INC	60,166	Azmeera Chandulal	TDP	45,611	14,555	
Khammam	274	Bhadrachalam (ST)	Sunnam Rajaiah	CPI(M)	46,058	Chichadi Sreerama Murthy	TDP	39,709	6,349	
Khammam	275	Burgampahad (ST)	Thati Venkateswarlu	TDP	45,904	Chanda Lingaiah	INC	42,976	2,928	
Khammam	276	Kothagudem	Vanama Venkateswara Rao	INC	60,632	Ayachitam Nagavani	TDP	43,918	16,714	
Khammam	277	Sathupalli	Thummala Nageswara Rao	TDP	87,717	Ponguleti Sudhakar Reddy	INC	56,688	31,029	
Khammam	278	Madhira	Kondabala Koteswara Rao	TDP	48,226	Katta Venkata Narasaiah	CPI(M)	43,225	5,001	
Khammam	279	Palair (SC)	Sambhani Chandra Sekhar	INC	51,638	Sandra Venkata Veeraiah	CPI(M)	40,380	11,258	
Khammam	280	Khammam	Younis Sultan	INC	51,159	Balasani Laxminarayana	TDP	44,372	6,787	
Khammam	281	Shujatnagar	Ramreddy Venkatareddy	INC	46,041	Potla Nageswara Rao	TDP	38,245	7,796	
Khammam	282	Yellandu (ST)	Gummadi Narsaiah	IND	47,806	Bhukya Dalsingh	INC	28,519	19,287	
Nalgonda	283	Tungaturthi	Sankineni Venkateswar Rao	TDP	55,604	Ramreddy Damoder Reddy	INC	50,605	4,999	
Nalgonda	284	Suryapet (SC)	Dosapati Gopal	INC	59,103	Aakarapu Sudarshan	TDP	49,998	9,105	
Nalgonda	285	Kodad	N. Uttam Kumar Reddy	INC	66,817	Venepalli Chendar Rao	TDP	59,508	7,309	
Nalgonda	286	Miryalguda	Repala Srinivas	INC	62,314	Aruna Sundari	TDP	54,850	7,464	
Nalgonda	287	Chalakurthi	Kunduru Jana Reddy	INC	72,649	Gundeboina Rammurthy	TDP	52,005	20,644	
Nalgonda	288	Nakrekal	Nomula Narsimhaiah Yadav	CPI(M)	40,229	Katikam Sathaiah Goud	TDP	35,114	5,115	
Nalgonda	289	Nalgonda	Komatireddy Venkat Reddy	INC	47,322	Nandiyala Narsimha Reddy	CPI(M)	42,882	4,440	
Nalgonda	290	Ramannapet	Uppunuthula Purushotham Reddy	INC	55,078	Mothe Peda Soma Reddy	TDP	55,078	12,503	
Nalgonda	291	Alair (SC)	Motkupalli Narasimhulu	INC	55,384	Kududula Nagesh	TDP	47,767	7,617	
Nalgonda	292	Bhongir	Alimineti Madhava Reddy	TDP	62,502	Andela Lingam Yadav	TDP	54,133	8,369	
Nalgonda	293	Mungode	Palvai Govardhan Reddy	INC	45,134	Jella Markandeya	TDP	41,095	4,039	
Nalgonda	294	Deverkonda (ST)	Dheeravath Raghya Naik	INC	46,294	Nenavath Vashya Naik	TDP	45,907	387	

== Bypolls ==
District	Constituency		Winner				Runner Up				Margin
District	No.	Name	Candidate	Party	Votes	%	Candidate	Party	Votes	%	Margin
Krishna	85	Gudivada	Raavi Venkateswara Rao	TDP	62,559	65.00	Sistla Ramesh	INC	30,562	31.70	31,997
Krishna	85	Gudivada	Bypoll held on 17 February 2000 following the death of the incumbent member Raavi Hari Gopal from Telugu Desam Party.								
district	204	Chevella	Sabitha Indra Reddy	INC	84,448	58.68	Kichennagari Laxma Reddy	TDP	54,539	37.90	29,909
district	204	Chevella	Bypoll held on 26 May 2000 following the death of the incumbent member P. Indra Reddy from Indian National Congress on 22 April 2000.								
Nalgonda	292	Assembly constituency	Uma Madhava Reddy	TDP	78,389	61.30	Chintala Venkateshwar Reddy	INC	31,901	24.94	46,488
Nalgonda	292	Assembly constituency	Bypoll held on 26 May 2000 following the death of the incumbent member Alimineti Madhava Reddy from Telugu Desam Party on 7 March 2000.								
Prakasam	123	Giddalur	Pidathala Sai Kalpana	TDP	53,910	63.82	Mudiam Peera Reddy	INC	28,812	34.11	25,098
Prakasam	123	Giddalur	Bypoll held on 19 February 2001 following the death of the incumbent member Pidathala Vijaya Kumar Reddy from Telugu Desam Party.								
Kadapa	155	Badvel	Konireddi Vijayamma	TDP	58,805	58.64	Vaddamani Sivarama Krishna Rao	INC	39,430	39.32	19,375
Kadapa	155	Badvel	Bypoll held on 19 February 2001 following the death of the incumbent member Bijivemula Veera Reddy from Telugu Desam Party.								
Krishna	84	Vuyyur	Anne Vijayalakshmi	TDP	52,421	58.28	Kolusu Parthasarathy	INC	35,970	39.99	16,451
Krishna	84	Vuyyur	Bypoll held on 20 September 2001 following the death of the incumbent member from Telugu Desam Party.								
Medak	220	Siddipet	K. Chandrasekhar Rao	TRS	82,632	72.35	Mareddi Srinivas Reddy	TDP	23,920	20.94	58,712
Medak	220	Siddipet	Bypoll held on 20 September 2001 following the resignation of the incumbent member K. Chandrashekhar Rao from Telugu Desam Party as MLA on 27 April 2001.								
Nalgonda	294	Deverakonda (ST)	Dheeravath Bharathi	INC	Un-contested						
Nalgonda	294	Deverakonda (ST)	Bypoll necessitated following the death of the incumbent member Dheeravath Raghya Naik from Indian National Congress.								
Medak	227	Medak	Karanam Uma Devi	TDP	43,463	37.23	Patlolla Shashidhar Reddy	INC	36,503	31.27	6,960
Medak	227	Medak	Bypoll held on 2 July 2002 following the death of the incumbent member Karanam Ramachandra Rao from Telugu Desam Party.								
Hyderabad	215	Karwan	Mohd. Muqtada Khan	AIMIM	67,376	51.51	Baddam Bal Reddy	BJP	47,660	36.43	19,716
Hyderabad	215	Karwan	Bypoll held on 26 September 2003 following the death of the incumbent member Syed Sajjad from All India Majlis-e-Ittehadul Muslimeen.								
