= Second N. Chandrababu Naidu ministry =

Andhra Pradesh Council of Ministers headed by N. Chandrababu Naidu (1999–2004)

- 21st Ministry of Andhra Pradesh

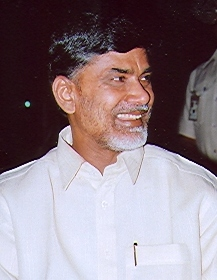
- N. Chandrababu Naidu
- Date formed: 11 October 1999
- Date dissolved: 14 May 2004

People and organisations
- Governor: C. Rangarajan; Surjit Singh Barnala
- Chief Minister: N. Chandrababu Naidu
- Member parties: Telugu Desam Party
- Status in legislature: Majority
- Opposition party: Indian National Congress
- Opposition leader: Y. S. Rajasekhara Reddy (Leader of the opposition)

History
- Election: 1999
- Outgoing election: 1994
- Legislature term: 5 years
- Predecessor: First N. Chandrababu Naidu ministry
- Successor: First Y. S. Rajasekhara Reddy ministry

The Second N. Chandrababu Naidu ministry (or also known as 21st ministry of Andhra Pradesh) of the state of Andhra Pradesh was formed on 11 October 1999 headed by N. Chandrababu Naidu as the Chief Minister following the 1999 Andhra Pradesh Legislative Assembly election. The cabinet was sworn in a simple ceremony held at Raj Bhavan, Hyderabad. Initially the chief minister and eight other ministers of his council of ministers were administered the oath of office and secrecy by the then Governor C. Rangarajan.

The cabinet was later expanded and reshuffled for four times citing several reasons on different occasions during the five year tenure to end on 14 May 2004.

== Background ==
The 1999 Andhra Pradesh legislative assembly elections were swept by the Telugu Desam Party (TDP). The TDP bagged 180 seats in the election and formed the government. N. Chandrababu Naidu incumbent chief minister of United Andhra Pradesh continued to be the chief minister for the second term. The Second N. Chandrababu Naidu Ministry was initially constituted with a nine member council consisting of the chief minister and other eight ministers on 11 October 1999 with a formal oath taking ceremony at the Raj Bhavan, Hyderabad constituted by the then Governor C Rangarajan. The eight ministers constituted a combination of seven cabinet rank ministers and one minister of state. The cabinet was expanded by inducting twenty six new ministers, Increasing the strength of the cabinet to thirty five. Besides the chief minister, the council consisted of twenty six cabinet ministers and eight ministers of state on 22 October 1999. Two others took the oath later, one as a cabinet minister and the other as a minister of state. Later with the assassination of the incumbent cabinet rank minister Alimineti Madhava Reddy on 7 March 2000, his wife Uma Madhava Reddy was inducted into the cabinet to substitute the vacant ministry post on 6 November 2000.

Later with the death of the incumbent minister Karnam Ramachandra Rao on 13 May 2002 due to ill health and the resignation of other two incumbent ministers, where the Suddala Devaiah, minister of state quit of murder charge on 17 June 2002 and Pocharam Srinivas Reddy in September 2002 on allegations in the involvement of the minister in a corruption, paved way for another set of expansion and reshuffling of the council. On 11 September 2002, the council had a minor reshuffling with the ministerial duties of the existing ministers, and inducting three new ministers into the cabinet. The council reshuffling majorly involved the induction of ministers from the Telangana region. The council further remained the same until the end of the legislative tenure i.e 14 May 2004.

Prior to the minor council reshuffling in 2002, the council witnessed a major council reshuffling in 2001. On 26 November 2001, the council was reshuffled by dropping eight ministers and inducting eleven new ones. Council consisting of six cabinet-rank ministers and five ministers of state. The strength of the council stood at thirty nine ministers as of 2001, with twenty nine cabinet-rank ministers and ten ministers of state.

== Achievements ==
The Second N. Chandrababu Naidu ministry witnessed the implementation of new reforms in the field of information and technology in the state of Andhra Pradesh.

== Council of Ministers ==
Key

- ^{†} Assassinated or died in office
- ^{RES} Resigned from office
- ^{⍟} Promoted to cabinet level

SI No.	Portfolio	Minister	Constituency	Tenure		Party
	Portfolio	Minister	Constituency	Took office	Left office	Party
	Chief Minister					
1	General Administration and all other Portfolios not allotted to other Ministers	N. Chandrababu Naidu	Kuppam	11 October 1999	14 May 2004	TDP
	Cabinet Ministers					
2	Revenue, Relief and Rehabilitation	Ashok Gajapathi Raju	Vizianagaram	11 October 1999	14 May 2004	TDP
3	Home, Jails, Fire Services, Sainik Welfare, Film Development Corporation, Cinematography	Tulla Devender Goud	Medchal	11 October 1999	14 May 2004	TDP
4	Panchayati Raj, Rural Development, Rural Water Supply and Employment Generation	Alimineti Madhava Reddy	Bhongir	11 October 1999	7 March 2000 ^{†}	TDP
5	Transport	B. V. Mohan Reddy	Yemmiganur	11 October 1999	14 May 2004	TDP
6	Finance, Planning, Small Savings, Lotteries and Legislative Affairs	Yanamala Ramakrishnudu	Tuni	11 October 1999	14 May 2004	TDP
7	Agriculture and Horticulture	Vadde Sobhanadreeswara Rao	Mylavaram	11 October 1999	14 May 2004	TDP
8	Roads, Building and Ports	K. Vijayarama Rao	Khairatabad	11 October 1999	14 May 2004	TDP
9	Medical, Health and Family Welfare	Sanakkayala Aruna	Guntur-II	22 October 1999	26 November 2001	TDP
10	Forest, Environment, Science & Technology	Chintakayala Ayyanna Patrudu	Narispatnam	22 October 1999	14 May 2004	TDP
11	Law and Courts	P. Chandrasekhar	Mahbubnagar	22 October 1999	14 May 2004	TDP
12	Municipal Administration, Urban Development, Minorities Welfare, Waqf, Urdu Academy	N. M. D. Farooq	Nandyal	22 October 1999	11 September 2002	TDP
12	Higher Education	N. M. D. Farooq	Nandyal	11 September 2002	14 May 2004	TDP
13	Food, Civil Supplies, Legal Metrology, Consumer Affairs	Nagam Janardhan Reddy	Nagarkurnool	22 October 1999	11 September 2002	TDP
13	Medical, Health and Family Welfare	Nagam Janardhan Reddy	Nagarkurnool	11 September 2002	14 May 2004	TDP
14	Commercial Taxes	J. Lakshmi Padmavathi	Parchur	22 October 1999	26 November 2001	TDP
15	Prohibition and Excise	Thummala Nageswara Rao	Sathupalli	22 October 1999	26 November 2001	TDP
15	Roads and Buildings	Thummala Nageswara Rao	Sathupalli	26 November 2001	14 May 2004	TDP
16	Minor Irrigation, A.P.I.D.C., Ground Water Development and Sericulture	K. E. Prabhakar	Dhone	22 October 1999	14 May 2004	TDP
17	Social Welfare	K. Pushpaleela	Ibrahimpatnam	22 October 1999	26 November 2001	TDP
18	Co-operation	Chikkala Ramachandra Rao	Tallarevu	22 October 1999	14 May 2004	TDP
19	Higher Education	Karnam Ramachandra Rao	Medak	22 October 1999	13 May 2002 ^{†}	TDP
20	Small Scale Industries, Khadi & Village Industries, C.M.E.Y., Sports, Youth Services and Self Employment	Tammineni Sitaram	Amadalavalasa	22 October 1999	14 May 2004	TDP
21	Endowments	Dandu Sivarama Raju	Undi	22 October 1999	14 May 2004	TDP
22	School Education, Adult Education, Libraries, Museums, Archaeology and Archives.	Kadiyam Srihari	Ghanpur (Station)	22 October 1999	14 May 2004	TDP
23	Mines and Geology	Pocharam Srinivas Reddy	Banswada	22 October 1999	5 September 2002 ^{RES} (Note: Date of resignation is unclear)	TDP
24	Energy, Coal and Boilers	Kothapalli Subbarayudu	Narasapuram	22 October 1999	14 May 2004	TDP
25	Marketing, Ware Housing Corporation	Bijivemula Veera Reddy	Badvel	22 October 1999	14 May 2004	TDP
26	Major Irrigation and Medium Irrigation	Mandava Venkateshwara Rao	Nizamabad Rural	22 October 1999	14 May 2004	TDP
27	Major Industries, Commerce and Export Promotion	Kotagiri Vidyadhara Rao	Chintalapudi	22 October 1999	14 May 2004	TDP
28	Information & Public Relations and Cultural Affairs	Naramalli Sivaprasad	Chittoor	22 October 1999 (Note: Minister did not take oath on this mentioned date)	26 November 2001	TDP
29	Mines & Geology	Uma Madhava Reddy	Bhongir	6 November 2000	14 May 2004	TDP
30	Information & Broadcasting	Somireddy Chandra Mohan Reddy	Sarvepalli	26 November 2001	14 May 2004	TDP
31	Labour & Tourism	Talasani Srinivas Yadav	Secunderabad	26 November 2001	14 May 2004	TDP
32	Information Technology, Roads and Buildings	Bojjala Gopala Krishna Reddy	Srikalahasti	26 November 2001	14 May 2004	TDP
33		J. R. Pushparaj	Tadikonda	26 November 2001	14 May 2004	TDP
34		P. Ramasubba Reddy	Jammalamadugu	26 November 2001	14 May 2004	TDP
35	Major Irrigation and Medium Irrigation	Kodela Siva Prasada Rao	Narasaraopet	26 November 2001	11 September 2002	TDP
35	Panchayati Raj and Rural Development and Civil Supplies	Kodela Siva Prasada Rao	Narasaraopet	11 September 2002	14 May 2004	TDP
36		Muddasani Damodar Reddy	Kamalapur	11 September 2002 ^{⍟}	14 May 2004	TDP
37	Technical Education and Training	Nerella Anjaneyulu	Yellareddy	11 September 2002	14 May 2004	TDP
38	Labour	Babu Mohan	Andole	11 September 2002	14 May 2004	TDP
39		C. Muthyam Reddy	Dommat	11 September 2002	14 May 2004	TDP
	Ministers of State					
40	Social Welfare, Women Welfare & Family Welfare	Somineni Saraswati	Kodur	11 October 1999	14 May 2004	TDP
41	Handlooms, Textiles, Printing and Stationery	P. Bhumanna	Adilabad	22 October 1999	14 May 2004	TDP
42	Animal Husbandry and Dairy Development	Kristappa Nimmala	Gorantla	22 October 1999	14 May 2004	TDP
43	Labour and Employment	C. Krishna Yadav	Himayathnagar	22 October 1999	26 November 2001	TDP
44	Tribal Welfare and Disabled Welfare	M. Mani Kumari	Araku	22 October 1999	14 May 2004	TDP
45	Tourism and Sugar	E. Peddi Reddy	Huzurabad	22 October 1999	26 November 2001	TDP
46	Housing	A. Prabhakar Reddy	Alur	22 October 1999	26 November 2001	TDP
47	Technical Education, Industrial Training Institutions	Alapati Rajendra Prasad	Vemuru	22 October 1999	26 November 2001	TDP
48	Backward Classes Welfare and Fisheries	N. Narasimha Rao	Bandar	22 October 1999	14 May 2004	TDP
49		Damacharla Anjaneyulu	Kondapi	26 November 2001	14 May 2004	TDP
50		Muddasani Damodar Reddy	Kamalapur	26 November 2001	11 September 2002 ^{⍟}	TDP
51		Suddala Devaiah	Narella	26 November 2001	17 June 2002 ^{RES}	TDP
52		Pathivada Narayanaswamy Naidu	Bhogapuram	26 November 2001	14 May 2004	TDP
53		Pothuganti Ramulu	Achampet	26 November 2001	14 May 2004	TDP

== See also ==
- Andhra Pradesh Council of Ministers
- First N. Chandrababu Naidu ministry
- First Y. S. Rajasekhara Reddy ministry
