= E. Peddi Reddy =

Indian politician

Member of Andhra Pradesh Legislative Assembly
- In office 1994–2004
- Preceded by: Kethiri Sai Reddy
- Succeeded by: V. Lakshmikantha Rao
- Constituency: Huzurabad

Minister of State Andhra Pradesh
- In office October 1999
- Constituency: Huzurabad

Personal details
- Born: Enugala Peddi Reddy
- Party: Bharatiya Janata Party
- Other political affiliations: Telugu Desam Party; Praja Rajyam Party
- Education: B.Com Kakatiya University

Enugala Peddi Reddy is an Indian politician. He was elected to the Andhra Pradesh Legislative Assembly from Huzurabad in the 1994 and 1999 Andhra Pradesh Legislative Assembly election as a member of the Telugu Desam Party. He was sworn in as Minister of State in N. Chandrababu Naidu cabinet from October 1999 to May 2004.

In June 2019, Reddy along with BRS leader A. P. Jithender Reddy, D. K. Aruna, who was a Minister in Andhra Pradesh and former Congress MLC, P. Sudhakar Reddy joined the Bharatiya Janata Party. He left Bharatiya Janata Party (BJP) ahead of Huzurabad bye-election 2021 and joined Telangana Rashtra Samithi (TRS) on 30 June 2021.

E Peddi Reddy left BRS and joined BJP in the presence of Union Tourism Minister G Kishan Reddy in Hyderabad on 29 April 2024.
