= Fourth N. T. Rama Rao ministry =

Andhra Pradesh Council of Ministers headed by N. T. Rama Rao (1994–1995)

- 19th Ministry of Andhra Pradesh

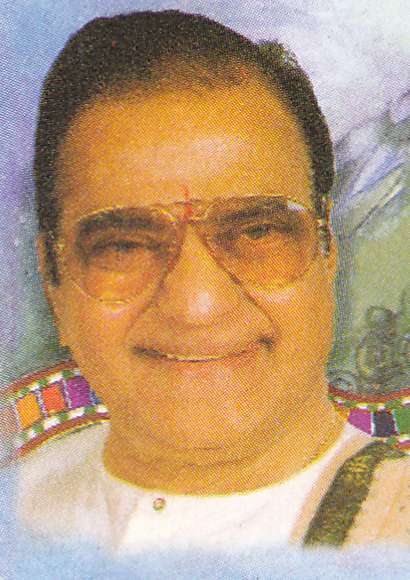
- N. T. Rama Rao
- Date formed: 12 December 1994
- Date dissolved: 1 September 1995

People and organisations
- Governor: Krishan Kant
- Chief Minister: N. T. Rama Rao
- Member parties: Telugu Desam Party
- Status in legislature: Majority
- Opposition party: Indian National Congress
- Opposition leader: P. Janardhan Reddy (Leader of the opposition)

History
- Election: 1994
- Outgoing election: 1989
- Legislature term: 1 year
- Predecessor: Second Kotla Vijaya Bhaskara Reddy Ministry
- Successor: First N. Chandrababu Naidu ministry

The Fourth N. T. Rama Rao ministry (or also known as 19th ministry of Andhra Pradesh) was formed in December 1994 and lasted till September 1995. N. T. Rama Rao was the Telugu film actor-turned-politician form Telugu Desam Party who was sworn in the Chief Minister of N. T. Rama Rao in December 1994.

His fourth and last term as Chief Minister only lasted nine months following a coup led by his son-in-law Nara Chandrababu Naidu in which he was ousted.

== Council of Ministers ==
#	Portfolio	Minister	Constituency	Tenure		Party
#	Portfolio	Minister	Constituency	Took office	Left office	Party
Chief Minister
1	Minister of Major irrigation, Power, Major Industries, General Administration, All-India Services, Law Order, Law, Handlooms & Textiles and all residual subjects	N. T. Rama Rao	Hindupur	12 December 1994	1 September 1995	TDP
Cabinet Ministers
2	Minister of Revenue, Relief, Rehabilitation, Finance, Planning, Small Savings & Lotteries	N. Chandrababu Naidu	Kuppam	12 December 1994	1 September 1995	TDP
3	Minister of Commercial Taxes, Legislative Affairs	Pusapati Ashok Gajapathi Raju	Vizianagaram	12 December 1994	1 September 1995	TDP
4	Minister of Roads and Buildings, Ports	Chintakayala Ayyanna Patrudu	Narsipatnam	12 December 1994	1 September 1995	TDP
5	Minister of Minorities, Wakf, Urdu Academy, Cinematography, Film Development Corporation, Science and Technology	Basheeruddin Babu Khan	Bodhan	12 December 1994	1 September 1995	TDP
6	Minister of Rs 2 a kg rice programme, Civil Supplies, Weights and Measures	Gorantla Butchaiah Chowdary	Rajahmundry	12 December 1994	1 September 1995	TDP
7	Minister of Transport.	P. Chandrasekhar	Mahbubnagar	17 December 1994	1 September 1995	TDP
8	Minister of Mines & Geology	Muddasani Damodar Reddy	Kamalapur	17 December 1994	1 September 1995	TDP
9	Minister of BC Welfare, cooperation and Total Prohibition	Tulla Devender Goud	Medchal	17 December 1994	1 September 1995	TDP
10	Minister of Home, Jail & Fire Services	P. Indra Reddy	Chevella	17 December 1994	1 September 1995	TDP
11	Minister of Health & Medical Education	Alimineti Madhava Reddy	Bhongir	17 December 1994	1 September 1995	TDP
12	Minister of Municipal Administration & Urban Development	B. V. Mohan Reddy	Yemmiganur	17 December 1994	1 September 1995	TDP
13	Minister of Higher Education, including College Education, & Intermediate Education	Gali Muddu Krishnama Naidu	Puttur	17 December 1994	1 September 1995	TDP
14	Minister of Medium Irrigation, Minor Irrigation, Drainage, Irrigation Development Corporation, Ground Water Development	Makineni Peda Rathaiah	Prathipadu	17 December 1994	1 September 1995	TDP
15	Minister of Social Welfare, Women Welfare & Family welfare	K. Pratibha Bharati	Srikakulam	17 December 1994	1 September 1995	TDP
16	Minister of Tourism, Culture, Archives, Archaeology, Museums & Handicrafts	Motkupalli Narasimhulu	Thungathurthi	17 December 1994	1 September 1995	TDP
17	Minister of Technical Education, Employment, Training	Devineni Nehru	Kankipadu	17 December 1994	1 September 1995	TDP
18	Minister of Primary Education, Employment, Training	Chikkala Ramachandra Rao	Tallarevu	17 December 1994	1 September 1995	TDP
19	Minister of Panchayat Raj, Rural Development, Rural Water Supply, Employment Generation	K. Ramachandra Rao	Medak	17 December 1994	1 September 1995	TDP
20	Minister of Labour	Paritala Ravindra	Penukonda	17 December 1994	1 September 1995	TDP
21	Minister of Endowments	Simhadri Satyanarayana Rao	Avanigadda	17 December 1994	1 September 1995	TDP
22	Minister of Information & Public Relations	Dadi Veerabhadra Rao	Anakapalle	17 December 1994	1 September 1995	TDP
23	Minister of Agriculture, Horticulture Sericulture	Kotagiri Vidyadhara Rao	Chintalapudi	17 December 1994	1 September 1995	TDP
Ministers of State
24	Minister of State for Small Scale Industries, Khadi & Village Industries, Leather Industries Development Lidcap	P. Brahmaiah	Rajampet	12 December 1994	1 September 1995	TDP
25	Minister of State for ST Welfare, Welfare of Physically Handicapped Persons	G. Nagesh	Boath	12 December 1994	1 September 1995	TDP
26	Minister of State for Sports, Youth Services, Youth Welfare, NCC, Self Employment	Dasyam Pranay Bhasker	Hanamkonda	17 December 1994	1 September 1995	TDP
27	Minister of State for Sugar, Commerce & Export Promotion	Nallapareddy Prasannakumar Reddy	Kovur	17 December 1994	1 September 1995	TDP
28	Minister of Animal Husbandary, Dairy Development & Fisheries	Paleti Rama Rao	Chirala	17 December 1994	1 September 1995	TDP
29	Minister of State for Forests & Environment	Ramasubbareddy Ponnapureddy	Jammalamadugu	17 December 1994	1 September 1995	TDP
30	Minister of State for Services (Except All-India Services) Courts, Justice, Stationery & Printing	Thammineni Seetharam	Amadalavalasa	17 December 1994	1 September 1995	TDP
31	Minister of State for Marketing & Warehousing	Kadiyam Srihari	Ghanpur Station	17 December 1994	1 September 1995	TDP
32	Minister of State for Housing	Kothapalli Subbarayudu	Narsapuram	17 December 1994	1 September 1995	TDP
