= Nageswara Rao =

Nageswara Rao is a Telugu-language name and may refer to:

- Akkineni Nageswara Rao (1923–2014), Telugu film actor and producer
- Edida Nageswara Rao (1934–2015), Telugu movie producer
- Karumuri Venkata Nageswara Rao (born 1964), Member of the Legislative Assembly of the Indian state of Andhra Pradesh
- Kasinathuni Nageswara Rao (1867–1938), journalist, nationalist and politician
- Lavu Nageswara Rao, Judge of the Supreme Court of India
- Mannem Nageswara Rao, Indian police officer, interim Director of Central Bureau of Investigation 2018
- Meduri Nageswara Rao (1910–1998), Member of Parliament
- Nama Nageswara Rao (born 1957), Indian politician
- Pendyala Nageswara Rao (1917–1984), dramatic actor, singer and music director
- Potla Nageswara Rao (born 1958), Member of Legislative Council (MLC) of Andhra Pradesh
- Rajanala Nageswara Rao (1928–1959), Telugu film actor
- Siva Nageswara Rao (born 1956), Telugu film director
- Thummala Nageswara Rao, member of the Telugu Desam Party
