= Nadakuditi Narasimha Rao =

Indian politician (1951–2021)

Nadakuditi Narasimha Rao (19 August 1951 – 2 April 2021) was an Indian politician from Andhra Pradesh. He was a former minister and a former member of the Andhra Pradesh Legislative Assembly form the Bandar Assembly constituency in Krishna district representing the Telugu Desam Party.

== Early life ==
Rao was from Mopidevi mandal but settled in Machilipatnam, then called as Bandar. He had three daughters and his eldest daughter Neelima married Kollu Ravindra, a former TDP MLA and Minister.

== Career ==
Rao won the Bandar Assembly constituency in the 1999 Andhra Pradesh Legislative Assembly election representing the Telugu Desam Party. He polled 60,022 votes and defeated his nearest rival, Perni Venkatramaiah (Nani) of the Indian National Congress, by 15,527 votes. He contested again on the TDP ticket in the 2004 Andhra Pradesh Legislative Assembly election and polled 67,570 votes, but lost to Nani of the Congress by 31,301 votes.

=== Death ===
Rao died at a private hospital in Hyderabad on 2 April 2021 due to COVID 19 related complications. His funeral was held at his home town Machilipatnam the next day.
