= Vadde Sobhanadreeswara Rao =

Indian politician

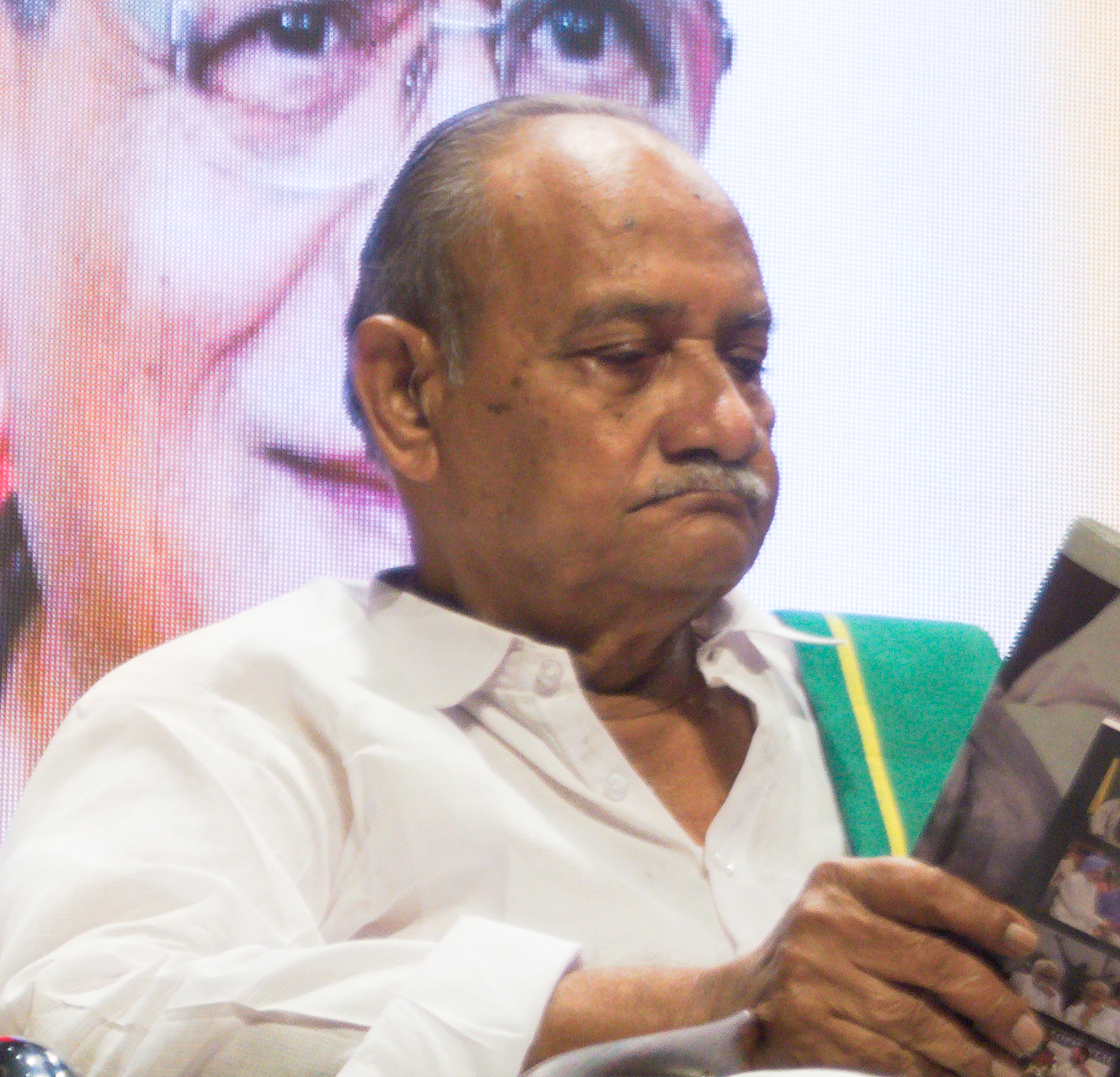

Minister of Agriculture Government of Andhra Pradesh
- In office 1999–2004
- Governor: C. Rangarajan; Surjit Singh Barnala
- Chief Minister: N. Chandrababu Naidu
- Preceded by: Kotagiri Vidyadhara Rao
- Succeeded by: Raghu Veera Reddy

Member of Parliament, Lok Sabha
- In office 1991–1996
- Preceded by: Chennupati Vidya
- Succeeded by: P. Upendra
- Constituency: Vijayawada
- In office 1984–1989
- Preceded by: Chennupati Vidya
- Succeeded by: Chennupati Vidya
- Constituency: Vijayawada

Member of Legislative Assembly Andhra Pradesh
- In office 1999–2004
- Preceded by: Chanamolu Venkata Rao
- Succeeded by: Jyestha Ramesh Babu
- Constituency: Mylavaram
- In office 1989–1991
- Preceded by: Anne Babu Rao
- Succeeded by: Anne Babu Rao
- Constituency: Vuyyuru
- In office 1978–1983
- Preceded by: Kakani Venkatratnam
- Succeeded by: KP Reddiah
- Constituency: Vuyyuru

Personal details
- Party: Telugu Desam Party

Vadde Sobhanadreeswara Rao (born 21 October 1943), is an Indian politician from Andhra Pradesh and a farmer leader. He served as the Member of Parliament representing the Vijayawada Lok Sabha constituency. He was also a former legislator of the Mylavaram Assembly constituency and served as the Agriculture Minister of United Andhra Pradesh in the Second N. Chandrababu Naidu ministry.

== Personal life ==
Sobhanadreeswara Rao was born on 21 October 1943, to Vadde Ankaiah and Annapurnamma in Vuyyuru. He pursued B.Sc. and B.E. for his education. In 1962, he married V. B. Rajyam and the couple has a son and a daughter.

== Political career ==
- 1972 Kakani Venkataratnam from Uyyuru Legislative Assembly Constituency contest for Legislative Assembly
- 1977 Contested as Member of Parliament in Machilipatnam
- 1978-83 Uyyuru was elected as a legislator
- 1984-89 Vijayawada was elected as a member of the 8th Lok Sabha
- 1991-96 Vijayawada was elected as a member of the 10th Lok Sabha
- 1997-99 AP in New Delhi Appointment as Special Representative of Govt
- 1999-2004 Election as MLA of Mylavaram and work as State Agriculture Minister
- 2004 Voluntary retirement from active politics
