= Somineni Saraswati =

Indian politician

Somineni Saraswati (born 1960) is an Indian politician from Andhra Pradesh. She is a former member of the Andhra Pradesh Legislative Assembly from the Kodur Assembly constituency in the Kadapa district representing the Telugu Desam Party. She was the only woman minister in the second N. Chandrababu Naidu ministry in 1999.

== Early life ==
Saraswati is from Kodur, Kadapa district, Andhra Pradesh. She married Chandrashekar. She completed her MA and MPhil at Sri Krishna Devaraya University, Ananthapuram. She declared assets worth Rs.19 lakhs in her affidavit to the Election Commission of India.

== Career ==
Saraswati won the Kodur Assembly constituency in the 1999 Andhra Pradesh Legislative Assembly election representing the Telugu Desam Party. She polled 38,228 votes and defeated her nearest rival, Gunti Venkateswara Prasad of the Indian National Congress, by a margin of 10,242 votes.
