= Anne Vijayalakshmi =

Indian politician

Anne Vijaya Lakshmi is an Indian politician from Andhra Pradesh. She is a former Member of the Legislative Assembly from Vuyyuru representing the Telugu Desam Party.

She first became an MLA winning the by election held on 20 September 2001 following the death of her husband and sitting MLA Anne Babu Rao. She won by 16,451 votes.
