= Bandar Assembly constituency =

Defunct assembly constituency of Andhra Pradesh

Coordinates: 16.19°N 81.13°E

Bandar
- Former constituency for the Andhra Pradesh Legislative Assembly

Constituency details
- Country: India
- Region: South India
- State: Andhra Pradesh
- District: Krishna
- Lok Sabha constituency: Machilipatnam
- Established: 1951
- Abolished: 2008
- Reservation: None

Bandar Assembly constituency was a constituency in Krishna district of Andhra Pradesh that elected representatives to the Andhra Pradesh Legislative Assembly in India. It was one of six assembly segments in Machilipatnam Lok Sabha constituency.

The constituency was established in 1951, as per the Delimitation Orders (1951) and abolished in 2008, as per the Delimitation Orders (2008).

== Members of the Legislative Assembly ==
Year	Member	Political party
1952	G. Anjeneyulu	Communist Party of India
1955	Kolipara Vankataramanayya	Indian National Congress
1959 by-election	Rallapalli Achyutha Ramaiah	Indian National Congress
1962	Pedasingu Lakshmana Rao	Independent
1967	Pedasingu Lakshmana Rao	Indian National Congress
1972	Pedasingu Lakshmana Rao	Indian National Congress
1978	Vaddi Ranga Rao	Janata Party
1983	Borra Venkataswami	Telugu Desam Party
1984 by-election	Vaddi Ranga Rao	Telugu Desam Party
1985	Vaddi Ranga Rao	Telugu Desam Party
1989	Perni Krishna Murthy	Indian National Congress
1994	Ambati Brahmanaiah	Telugu Desam Party
1999	Nadakuditi Narasimha Rao	Telugu Desam Party
2004	Perni Venkataramaiah	Indian National Congress
