= Gundeboina Rammurthy Yadav =

Indian politician (1947–2019)

MLA of Chalakurthi
- In office 1994–1999
- Preceded by: Kunduru Jana Reddy
- Succeeded by: Kunduru Jana Reddy

Personal details
- Born: 1 November 1947
- Died: 11 October 2019 (aged 71)
- Party: Bharat Rashtra Samithi

Gundeboina Rammurthy Yadav (26 October 1947 – 11 October 2019) was an Indian politician belonging to Bharat Rashtra Samithi. He was elected a member of Andhra Pradesh Legislative Assembly from Chalakurthi in 1994. He died on 11 October 2019.
