= Karanam Uma Devi =

Indian politician

Karanam Uma Devi is an Indian politician from Andhra Pradesh. She is a former Member of the Legislative Assembly from Medak representing the Telugu Desam Party.

She married Karanam Ramachandra Rao, a former education minister and a five time MLA from Medak. She won the by-election held on 2 July 2002 following the death of her husband and incumbent member, Rao. She polled 43,463 votes and defeated her nearest rival, Patlolla Shashidhar Reddy of the Indian National Congress, by a margin of 6,960 votes.
