= Dheeravath Bharathi =

Indian politician

Dheeravath Bharathi Devi

Member of the Legislative Assembly
- In office 20 May 2002 – 2004
- Preceded by: Dheeravath Raghya Naik
- Succeeded by: Ravindra Kumar Ramavath
- Constituency: Devarakonda

Personal details
- Occupation: Politician

Dheeravath Bharathi Devi is an Indian politician from Andhra Pradesh. In 2002, she was elected unopposed as a Member of the Legislative Assembly from Deverakonda Assembly constituency, which is reserved for Scheduled Tribe community in Nalgonda district.

Devi was the wife of sitting Congress MLA Raghya Naik, who was killed by the banned People's War Group naxalites at Maddimagudu in December 2001. His death caused the vacancy and the by-election. She was nominated for the seat by the Indian National Congress and all other major parties including Telugu Desam, Bhartiya Janata Party, Communist Party of India and Communist Party of India (Marxist) decided to support her nomination in solidarity with the slain leader. On 20 May 2002, she was declared elected unopposed from Devarakonda Assembly constituency by the returning officer after the BJP rebel candidate withdrew his nomination.
