= M. S. Partha Sarathi =

Indian politician

Member of Legislative Assembly of Andhra Pradesh
- In office 1999–2004
- Preceded by: Jonna Suryanarayana
- Succeeded by: Jonna Ramaiah
- Constituency: Kadiri

Personal details
- Born: 6 August 1961 (age 65) Kadiri, Anantapur district, Andhra Pradesh
- Party: Bharatiya Janata Party
- Spouse: Sree Lakshmi
- Website: Official site

M. S. Partha Sarathi (born 6 August 1961) was MLA representing Kadiri constituency. Presently, He is The Chairman of The Finance Committee of The Bharatiya Janata Party Andhra Pradesh.

== Early life ==
M.S. Partha Sarathi was born in Kadiri in Anantapur district to Laithamma and Satya Narayana Sreshti in 1961. He completed his schooling and intermediate in Kadiri and he did his B.A. Degree in Madanapalli Besant Theosophical College.

== Career ==
Sarathi started his career as a supporter of the Rashtriya Swayamsevak Sangh (RSS) Mukhya Sikshak and worked as RSS Prachrak.

He then moved into politics as a member of the Bharatiya Janata Party (|BJP) and he contested and won the Kadiri constituency as their candidate in the Eleventh Andhra Pradesh state legislative assembly elections.

== Personal life ==
Sarathi is married to Sree Lakshmi. They have two children.

== Achievements ==
- He is the first BJP MLA elected from Rayalaseema Region.

== Positions held ==
- Ghata Nayak, RSS [Sayam sakha (Evening Branch), Kadiri] in the year 1970.
- Mukya Sikshak, RSS [Sayam sakha (Evening Branch), Kadiri] in the year 1972.
- Class pupil leader in the year1975.
- Founder Chairman, ABVP Madanapalli branch in the year 1976.
- Convener, Student agitation against congress leader attack on BT college students in the year 1979.
- Pracharakh, RSS (Kavali, Nellore Dist.) in the year 1980 to 1982.
- Convener, Punaragamanam (Back to Hindu religion from converted religions) at Bogha demma kanuma, Gandlapenta Mandal in the year 1983.
- Secretary, BJP (Anantapur Dist.) in the year 1983.
- BJP In-charge of Kadiri Assembly elections held on 1985(Independent candidate), 1989, 1994.
- BJP In-charge of Hindupur Parliament elections held on 1991, 1996, 1998.
- National Council member, BJP in the year 1995.
- MLA, Kadiri in the year 1999.
- Trasurer, BJLP, Andhra Pradesh in the year 1999.
- Member, Women and Child welfare committee in the year 1999.
- Member, Faction zone committee in the year 2001.
- President, BJP, Anantapur Dist. in the year 2005.
- Secretary, BJP, Andhra Pradesh in the year 2010.
- Chairman, State Finance Committee, BJP Andhra Pradesh in the year 2013.
