= K. Vijayarama Rao =

Indian politician and police officer (d. 2023)

Minister for Commercial Taxes, Roads & Buildings
- In office 11 October 1999 – 14 May 2004

Member of the Andhra Pradesh Legislative Assembly
- In office 1999–2004
- Preceded by: P. Janardhan Reddy
- Succeeded by: P. Janardhan Reddy
- Constituency: Khairatabad

Personal details
- Born: 04 April 1937 Warangal, Andhra Pradesh (present-day Telangana, India)
- Died: 13 March 2023 (aged 86–87) Hyderabad, Telangana, India

K. Vijayarama Rao (04 April 1937 – 13 March 2023) was an IPS Officer, a former CBI director, and an Indian politician belonging to Telangana State. He was elected from Khairatabad Assembly constituency in 1999 elections and served as Minister in N. Chandrababu Naidu's Cabinet.

== Political career ==
K. Vijayarama Rao after his retirement he joined Telugudesham Party and contested elections from Khairtabad Assembly Constituency in 1999 Assembly polls and elected as MLA and inducted into N. Chandrababu Naidu's Cabinet as Minister for Commercial Taxes, Roads & Buildings. He Unsuccessfully contested elections in 2004 & 2009. He later joined the ruling BRS (then TRS) after the formation of Telangana state.

== Death ==
K. Vijayarama Rao died at a private hospital in Hyderabad on 14 March 2023 due to brain-related health issues.
