= Ragya Naik =

Indian politician

Ragya Naik was an Indian politician. He represented the Devarakonda constituency in Nalgonda as an Indian National Congress party legislator.

He was gunned down on 29 December 2001, by People's War Group militants while on a visit to his village Maddimadugu in Mahbubnagar
