= Mandava Venkateshwara Rao =

Indian politician

Minister of Irrigation Government of Andhra Pradesh
- In office 22 October 1999 – 14 May 2004
- Governor: C. Rangarajan; Surjit Singh Barnala
- Chief Minister: N. Chandrababu Naidu

Minister of Excise Government of Andhra Pradesh
- In office 8 October 1995 – 11 October 1999
- Governor: Krishan Kant; C. Rangarajan
- Chief Minister: N. Chandrababu Naidu

Member of Legislative Assembly, Andhra Pradesh
- In office 1989–2004
- Preceded by: Mandava M. J. Thomas Chowdary
- Succeeded by: Gaddam Ganga Reddy
- Constituency: Dichpally
- In office 2009–2014
- Preceded by: Constituency established
- Succeeded by: Bajireddy Goverdhan
- Constituency: Dichpally

Personal details
- Party: Indian National Congress (since 2023)
- Other party: Bharat Rashtra Samithi (2019–2023); Telugu Desam Party (1985–2019)

Mandava Venkateshwara Rao is an Indian politician from the state of Telangana. He has won four terms as an MLA from Dichpally Assembly Constituency and once from Nizamabad Rural Assembly constituency in the united state of Andhra Pradesh and served as Minister of Excise Department, Education Department and Heavy Irrigation Department.

== Career ==
Rao entered politics through the Telugu Desam Party (TDP) and successfully contested as a candidate in the 1985 Andhra Pradesh Legislative Assembly election from Dichpalli Assembly constituency over his closest rival Indian National Congress candidate Antareddy Bal Reddy with a majority of 7726 votes.

Rao served as Vice Chairman of the State Planning Commission in 1995 and Excise Minister in First N. Chandrababu Naidu ministry cabinet in 1997. He also served as the Minister of Heavy Irrigation in Second N. Chandrababu Naidu ministry for three years and in 2002 he held the charge of Education Minister.

Rao contested the 2004 elections on behalf of the TDP and was defeated by his nearest rival TRS candidate Gaddam Gangareddy. He contested as a TDP candidate in 2008 (by-election) and repeated the same result. He was re-reelected in the 2009 Andhra Pradesh Legislative Assembly election from the Nizamabad Rural Assembly constituency.

Telangana Chief Minister K. Chandrasekhar Rao visited Rao's house in Hyderabad on 5 April 2019 and invited him to join the party. He joined the Telangana Rashtra Samithi party at Pragathi Bhavan on 6 April 2019.

Rao joined the Congress party in the presence of Rahul Gandhi at the Congress election campaign meeting at Bodhan on 25 November 2023.
