= Suddala Devaiah =

Indian politician (born 1956)

Suddala Devaiah (born 1956) is an Indian politician from Telangana. He is a former three time member of the Andhra Pradesh Legislative Assembly representing the Telugu Desam Party, from the Choppadandi Assembly constituency, which was reserved for Scheduled Caste community, in Karimnagar district, that was part of the combined Andhra Pradesh, before the bifurcation of the state. He was elected as an MLA in the 1994, 1999 from Narella seat, and in 2009 from Choppadandi seat.

== Early life and education ==
Devaiah is from Choppadandi, Karimnagar district, in the present Telangana state. He is the son of S Venkati. He passed Class 12 and joined BA at SRR Degree College, Karimnagar, which is affiliated with Osmania University, but discontinued his studies midway through. He declared assets worth Rs.1 crore in his affidavit to the Election Commission of India.

== Career ==
Devaiah began his political career with the Telugu Desam party as a sarpanch of Antargam village and later became the chairperson of the Karimnagar Zilla Parishad. He won the Choppadandi Assembly constituency in the 2009 Andhra Pradesh Legislative Assembly election representing the Telugu Desam Party. He polled 68,841 votes and defeated his nearest rival, Gunukonda Babu of the Indian National Congress, by a margin of 32,988 votes. He later shifted to the Indian National Congress and contested the 2014 Andhra Pradesh Legislative Assembly election on the Congress ticket, but lost to Bodiga Shobha of the Telangana Rashtra Samithi by 54,981 votes.

He first became an MLA winning the Narella Assembly constituency in the 1994 Andhra Pradesh Legislative Assembly election and retained the seat for the Telugu Desam Party in the 1999 Andhra Pradesh Legislative Assembly election. He lost the 2004 election as a TDP candidate to Lingaiah Kashipet of the TRS.

He also served as the Minister for State Cooperation and Labour.
