= Dandu Sivarama Raju =

Indian politician (1936–2010)

Dandu Sivarama Raju (14 July 1936 – 14 November 2010) was an Indian politician from Andhra Pradesh. He was a former two time member of the Andhra Pradesh Legislative Assembly from Attili Assembly constituency in West Godavari district representing the Telugu Desam Party.

Raju was from Mandalaparru village, Nidamarru mandal, West Godavari district, Andhra Pradesh.

== Career ==
Raju first became an MLA winning the Attili Assembly constituency 1989 Andhra Pradesh Legislative Assembly election representing the Telugu Desam Party. He polled 46,640 votes and defeated his nearest rival, Indukuri Ramakrishnamraju of the Indian National Congress (Indira), by 1,111 votes. He lost the next election in 1994 to Kanumuru Bapiraju by a margin of 6420 votes. But he regained the Attili seat for the TDP in the 1999 Andhra Pradesh Legislative Assembly election. In 1999, he polled 60,868 votes and defeated his closest opponent, Nookarapu Suryaprakasarao of the Congress, by 24,689 votes.

He served as a Minister for Endowments in the Chandrababu Naidu government from 1999 to 2004.

=== Death ===
After a prolonged illness, Raju died at his native village, Mandalaparru on 14 November 2010. Since he had no kin of his own, he donated all his properties for charity purposes.
