= Chikkala Ramachandra Rao =

Indian politician (born 1949)

Chikkala Ramachandra Rao (born 17 March 1949) is an Indian politician from Andhra Pradesh. He is a former five time member of the Andhra Pradesh Legislative Assembly from the Tallarevu Assembly constituency in East Godavari district representing the Telugu Desam Party.

== Early life ==
Rao was born on 17 March 1949 in Kakinada, East Godavari, Andhra Pradesh. He is the son the late Tirapaiah and Veeraraghavamma. He completed his BCom at V.S.M. College, Ramachandrapuram. He declared assets worth Rs.94 lakhs in his affidavit to the Election Commission of India.

== Career ==
Rao became an MLA for the first time winning the Tallarevu Assembly constituency in the 1983 Andhra Pradesh Legislative Assembly election as an Independent Candidate. He polled 46,542 votes and defeated his nearest rival, Kommireddy Taradevi of the Indian National Congress, by 32,299 votes. He joined the Telugu Desam Party and retained the seat for the next four terms contesting on TDP ticket in 1985, 1989, 1994 and 1999 to become a five time Member of the Legislative Assembly. He lost the 2004 election, also on TDP ticket to Dommeti Venkateswarlu of the Indian National Congress, by 14,599 votes.

In 2007, he served as an MLC of East Godavari district. He served as the Minister of Primary Education, Employment, Training in the Second and Third N. T. Rama Rao ministry from 1985 to 1989. Later, he served as the same minister in the fourth N. T. Rama Rao ministry from December 1994 to September 1995.
