= Potla Nageswara Rao =

MLC
- Constituency: Khammam (Local Body Constituency)

Personal details
- Born: 5 March 1958 (age 68)
- Party: indian national congress
- Spouse: Madhavi
- Children: 2
- Education: AB, LLB

Potla Nageswara Rao (born 5 March 1958) is an Indian billionaire entrepreneur, philanthropist, Educationalist and Member of Legislative Council (MLC) of Telangana. He represents the Local body Constituency of Khammam and is a senior leader of the Indian National Congress from Khammam District. He is also an industrialist, he established Adam's Engineering College in 1998 at Paloncha, Khammam District.

== Professional career ==
He debuts business as an Excise Contractor in 1982. Then after he entered the Aquaculture business in 1992 at Ongole district, Andhra Pradesh. After that in 1994, he started Charminar Breweries with the brand name of Royal Challenge Beer.

He established Educational Institutions on the name of Adams Engineering College in 1998 at Paloncha, Khammam District.

He also started another breweries unit in 2004 with the name of Crown Beers India Ltd. near Sanga Reddy, Hyderabad. He introduced BUDWEISER BEER in India with a joint venture of ANHEUSER-BUSCH at Saint Louis, Missouri State, USA.

In 2005, he entered the construction business with the name of Aditya Construction, Khammam. Aditya construction develops the land and sales House Sites around Andhra Pradesh.

In 2008, Established another engineering college as Nagole Institute of Technology and Science, Kuntloor Village, Nagole, Hyderabad.

In 2016–2017, he Started Avocado fruit oil extraction Unit at Nairobi, Kenya to export Europe and the USA. And also Planning to expand the Avocado fruit Oil extraction business in KISSEE, Kenya.

Henceforth he is planning to develop the Avocado fruit Oil refinery unit in Thika, Kenya.

== Political career ==
In 1982, he joined the Telugu Desam Party. From 1987 to 1992, he served as the Chairman of the Committee of Youth Services (Yuva Shakti Corporation), Government of Andhra Pradesh. In 2005, he was elected as the vice-chairman of the District Cooperative Central Bank (DCCB)-Khammam. On 2 April 2009, he was elected as a Member of the Legislative Council (MLC) of Andhra Pradesh, representing the local body constituency of Khammam District, Andhra Pradesh.
