= Nerella Anjaneyulu =

Indian politician

Ex-Minister
- In office 3 Terms
- Constituency: Yellareddy

Personal details
- Born: 3 July 1953 (age 73) Gandhari Nizamabad District Telangana
- Party: TRS
- Spouse: Nerella Anjali Bai
- Education: B.Sc & D Pharm

Nerella Anjaneyulu, widely known as Anjanna, served three consecutive five-year terms from 1989 through 2004 as a Member of the Legislative Assembly (MLA) of the Indian state of Andhra Pradesh. During his time in the assembly, he represented the constituency of Yellareddy in northwestern Andhra Pradesh as a member of the Telugu Desam Party. (In 2014, Yellareddy and the surrounding regions of northwestern Andhra Pradesh became part of the new Indian state of Telangana.) In September 2002, Nara Chandrababu Naidu, the Chief Minister of Andhra Pradesh, appointed Anjaneyulu the Minister for Technical Education and Training.

== Personal life ==
Anjaneyulu was the son of Nerella Bhagaiah and Gouramma who belongs to Munnuru Kapu caste. He was born and brought up in Gandhari Village and Mandal. Basically he is a landlord by birth, who used to own about more than 650 acres of agricultural land in various villages. His father was Sarpanch of Gandhari for 17 years and served as a Samithi Vice-President of Yellareddy for one term. Anjaneyulu was married to Nerella Anjali Bai. They had four daughters and adopted Kommu Haren the son of their last daughter, Nerella Vijaya Lakshmi and Kommu Srikanth

== Positions held ==
- Co-option Member of Panchayat Samithi, Yellareddy
- Chairman of P.A.C.S (Primary Agriculture Co-op Society)
- Director of NDCCB (Nizamabad District Co-op Central Bank)
- Sarpanch of Gandhari GP & Mandal Parishad Vice President
- MLA (Member of the Legislative Assembly)
- Govt Whip
- Chairman of Civil Supply Corporation (A.P)
- Minister for Technical Education (A.P)
