= K. E. Prabhakar =

Indian politician

Kambalapadu Ediga Prabhakar (born 23 November 1955) is an Indian politician from Andhra Pradesh. He is a former three time member of the Andhra Pradesh Legislative Assembly election from the Dhone Assembly constituency in Kurnool district, representing the Telugu Desam Party. He won the 1996 bypoll and retained the seat for TDP in 1999 election. Later, he won from Pattikonda Assembly constituency in 2009. He was nominated as a minister in the TDP government in 2009.

== Early life ==
Prabhakar was born on 23 November 1955 in Kambalapadu, Kurnool district, Andhra Pradesh to late KE Madanna. He completed his MA at Indore University in 1982. He runs his own business and declared assets worth Rs.29 crore in his affidavit to the Election Commission of India.

== Career ==
Prabhakar first became an MLA winning the Dhone Assembly constituency in the byelection held in 1996. He polled 64,459 votes and defeated his nearest rival, Kotla Hari Chakrapani Reddy of the Indian National Congress by 28,578 votes. He reatined the seat for the Telugu Desam Party winning the Dhone seat again in the 1999 Andhra Pradesh Legislative Assembly election where he polled 70,785 votes and beat his closest opponent, R. E. Ravi Kumar of the Indian National Congress by 36,427 votes.

Later, he shifted to Pattikonda Assembly constituency and won the seat for the Telugu Desam Party in the 2009 Andhra Pradesh Legislative Assembly election, beating S. V. Chandra Mohan Reddy of the Indian National Congress by 9,972 votes.

In December 2017, he was unanimously elected as the MLC in the local body polls.
