= K. Pushpaleela =

Indian politician (born 1963)

Ex-Minister

Personal details
- Born: 1963 (age 62–63) Hyderabad, AP
- Party: Indian National congress

Kondru Pushpaleela (born 1963) is an Indian politician. She was an MLA in Andhra Pradesh Legislative Assembly from Ibrahimpatnam assembly constituency and was a minister of social welfare cabinet minister She belongs to the Madiga social community.

== Early life ==
K. Pushapaleela was born in Hyderabad to a businessman. She was the second child among eight siblings. She completed her Bachelors after her marriage. she got her M. A. degree from Osmania University from 1992. In 1994 she got her M. Phil.

== Career ==
K. Pushpaleela has been fighting for the categorization of Scheduled castes.

=== Political career ===
During the time of 'Prajala Vaddaku Palana' she took the Telugu Desam Party ticket. In 1999 she contested from Ibrahim Patnam and defeated the fifteen-year regime of communist party there.

She joined the Bharat Rashtra Samithi after being denied MLA ticket but later joined the Indian National Congress party and became PCC secretary. and then joined Bhartiya janata party

== Personal life ==
K. Pushpaleela married Kondru Ramdass in 1981. They have two children named suman kondru and sushma dass .
