= Ponguleti Sudhakar Reddy =

Indian politician

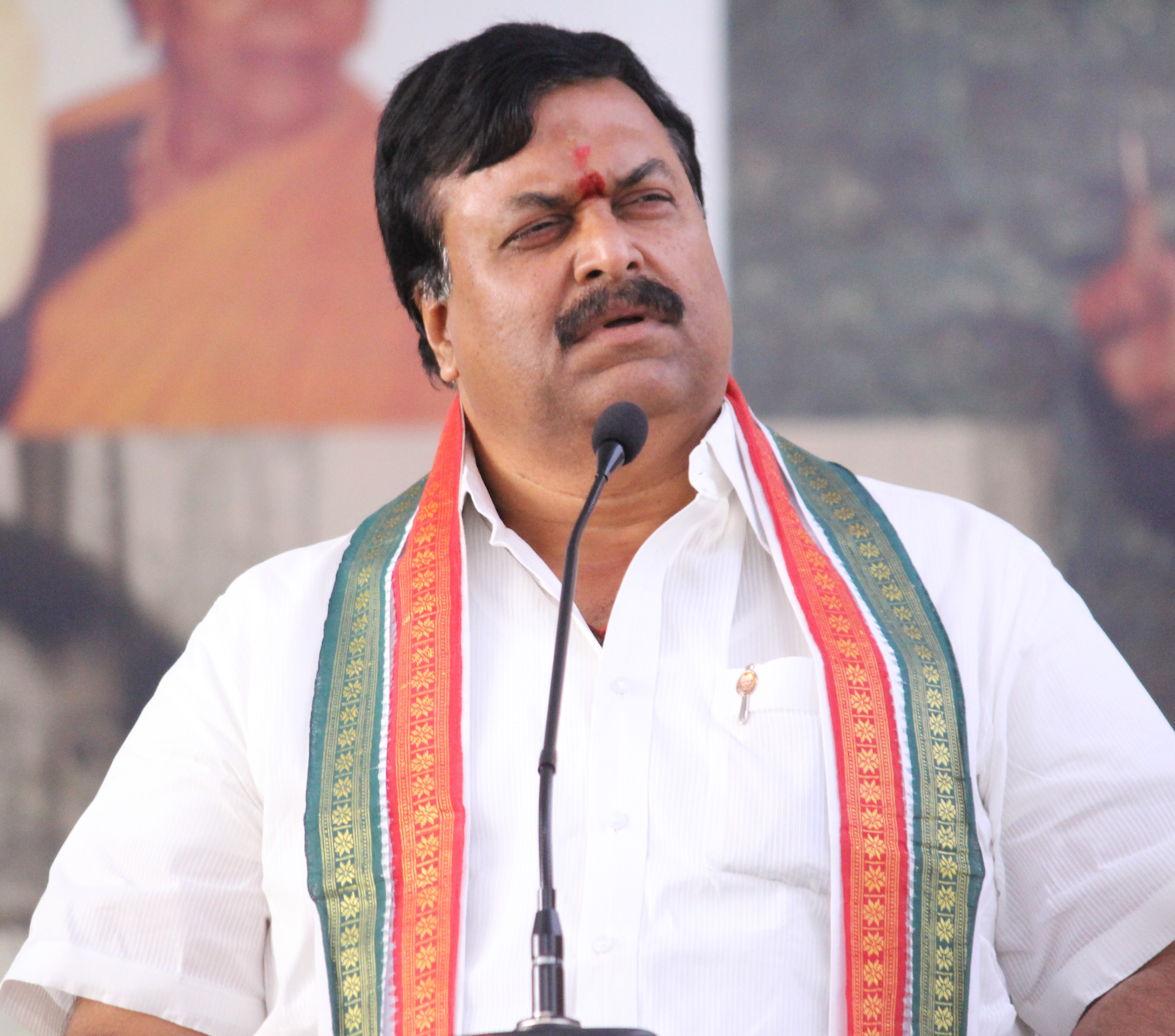

Personal details
- Born: Narayanapuram Village, Kallur, Khammam
- Party: Bharatiya Janata Party
- Other political affiliations: Indian National Congress
- Spouse: Geetha Reddy
- Children: 2

Ponguleti Sudhakar Reddy is an Indian politician belonging to Bharatiya Janata Party. He is a Member of Legislative Council in Andhra Pradesh and previously was Secretary, All India Congress Committee.

== Early life ==
Sudhakar Reddy was born in Narayanpuram, Kallur mandal, Khammam in Telangana. He is the second son of Laxmareddy and Nagamma Garu.

== Career ==
Ponguleti Sudhakar Reddy was Youth Congress President. Ponguleti Sudhakar Reddy served as the Chairman of A.P. Tourism Development Corporation. Mr. Reddy was a Part-time Non-official Director of Indian Bank. He has been designated as an "Ambassador for world peace" by the Interreligious and International Federation for World Peace. He is an Agriculturist and a Social Worker. Mr. Reddy has a bachelor's degree in commerce and a master's degree in linguistics from Osmania University. Ponguleti Sudhakar Reddy resigned from Congress party and decided to join the Bharatiya Janata Party in 2019.
