= Kotagiri Vidyadhara Rao =

Indian politician

Member of Legislative Assembly, Andhra Pradesh
- In office 1983–2004
- Preceded by: Gadde Venkateswara Rao
- Succeeded by: Ghanta Murali Ramakrishna
- Constituency: Chintalapudi

Personal details
- Born: 1946 Eluru, Eluru district, India
- Died: 20 July 2013 (aged 66)
- Party: Indian National Congress
- Other political affiliations: Telugu Desam Party; Praja Rajyam Party
- Children: Kotagiri Sridhar (son)

Kotagiri Vidhyadher Rao (April 28, 1946 – 20 July 2013) was an Indian politician who served as a Member of the Legislative Assembly (MLA) and held ministerial positions in the government. He was a five time MLA from Eluru district, Andhra Pradesh. He was in TDP, PRP (which joined Congress).

== Early life ==
He was born at Thurpu Edavalli village in the Kamavarapukota Mandal, Eluru District, Andhra Pradesh.

== Career ==
Kotagiri Vidyadhara Rao began his political career as a village sarpanch. He served as MLA from the Chintalapudi assembly constituency for five terms and served as a Minister of the State in both N T Rama Rao and Chandrababu Naidu cabinets. He joined Praja Rajyam in 2009 and was political affairs committee member. He was a key aide to actor-turned-politician Chiranjeevi.

He served in the following positions:

1978: Chairman - Agricultural Market Committee, Chintalapudi

1981: Vice President - Panchayat Samithi, Chintalapudi

1983: MLA, Chintalapudi - elected as an Independent, later joined Telugu Desam Party in Oct. 1983

1985 - 1999: Re-elected as MLA, Chintalapudi

1984: Chairman - AP Industries Infrastructure Corp.

1985: Director - AP Industries Development Corp., Director- AP Kadhi & Village Industries Board

1987: Director - AP State Road Transport Corp., Chairman Shatavahana Region, APSRTC

1987 - 1989: Chairman Public Undertakings Committee, AP Legislature

1989: Deputy Leader of Opposition

1991 - 1994: Leading the Opposition after Shri NT Rama Rao announced that he would not attend Assembly for the ill treatment, extended by the Govt. on the Floor of the House

1994: Appointed Minister for Agriculture (N. T. Rama Rao cabinet)

1995 - 1996: Appointed Minister for Panchayat Raj Rural Development & Rural Water Supply (N. T. Rama Rao cabinet)

1996 - 1999: Minister for Agriculture (N. Chandrababu Naidu cabinet)

1999 - 2004: Minister for Large scale Industries (N. Chandrababu Naidu cabinet)

== Death ==
He died in his home in Eluru, Andhra Pradesh from a cardiac arrest on 20 July 2013.

== Personal life ==
Vidhyadher Rao was married, had a son (Sridhar Kotagiri) and a daughter (Anitha Ponnala) and four grandchildren. His son represented the Eluru parliamentary constituency from 2019 to 2024.
