= 1989 Andhra Pradesh Legislative Assembly election =

- 22 November 1989

All 294 seats in the Andhra Pradesh Legislative Assembly 148 seats needed for a majority
- Registered: 42,448,805
- Turnout: 29,899,530 (70.44%) ▲2.87%
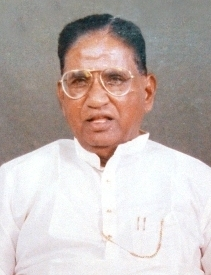

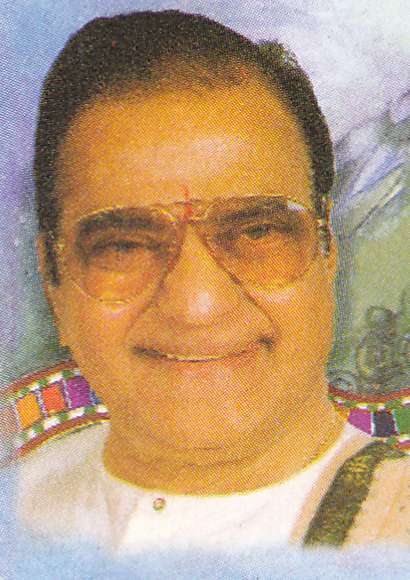
| | Majority party | Minority party |
|---|---|---|
| Leader | Marri Chenna Reddy | N. T. Rama Rao |
| Party | INC(I) | TDP |
| Alliance | – | NF |
| Leader since | 1978 | 1982 |
| Leader's seat | Sanathnagar (won) | Hindupur (won), Kalwakurthy (lost) |
| Last election | 50 seats, 37.25% | 202 seats, 46.21% |
| Seats won | 181 | 74 |
| Seat change | ▲131 | ▼128 |
| Popular vote | 13,539,785 | 10,506,982 |
| Percentage | 47.09% | 36.54% |
| Swing | ▲9.84% | ▼9.67% |
- 1989 Andhra Pradesh Legislative Assembly election results
Chief minister before election
N. T. Rama Rao
TDP
Chief minister after election
Marri Chenna Reddy
INC(I)

The 1989 Andhra Pradesh Legislative Assembly election were held to elect the 9th legislative assembly of Andhra Pradesh. In the 1989 Andhra Pradesh Assembly election, Indian National Congress swept the polls, winning 181 of the 294 seats in the Assembly. As the leader of the Congress Legislature Party, Marri Chenna Reddy was elected the Chief Minister. The TDP won only 74 seats compared to 202 seats where it emerged victorious in 1985 Andhra Pradesh Legislative Assembly election, due to anti incumbency wave which prevailed around the state. General Elections were held simultaneously and resulted in the INC(I) winning in 39 out of 42 Lok Sabha constituencies. The Telugu Desam Party on the other hand, won a meagre 2 Lok Sabha constituencies.

== Parties and alliances ==
| Alliance/Party | | Flag | Symbol | Leader | Seats contested | |
|---|---|---|---|---|---|---|
| National Front | Telugu Desam Party | | | N. T. Rama Rao | 241 | 291 |
| National Front | Communist Party of India | | | Chilumula Vittal Reddy (Note: this is the Floor Leader of the party) | 19 | 291 |
| National Front | Communist Party of India (Marxist) | | | Narra Raghava Reddy | 15 | 291 |
| National Front | Bharatiya Janata Party | | | Venkaiah Naidu | 12 | 291 |
| National Front | Janata Dal | | | V. P. Singh | 4 | 291 |
| Indian National Congress | | | | N. Janardhana Reddy | 287 | |

== List of Candidates ==
| District | Constituency | | INC | | TDP+ | |
| District | # | Name | Party | Candidate | Party | Candidate |
|---|---|---|---|---|---|---|
| Srikakulam | 1 | Ichapuram | INC | Buddala Trinadha Reddy | TDP | M. V. Krishnarao |
| Srikakulam | 2 | Sompeta | INC | Majji Narayanarao | TDP | Vadisa Baiakrishna |
| Srikakulam | 3 | Tekkali | INC | Sattaru Lokanadham | TDP | Duvvada Nagavali |
| Srikakulam | 4 | Harishchandrapuram | INC | Kannepalli Appalan Arasimha | Did not contest | |
| Srikakulam | 5 | Narasannapeta | INC | Dharmana Prasada Rao | TDP | Prabhakara Rao Simma |
| Srikakulam | 6 | Pathapatnam | INC | Dharmana Narayana Rao | TDP | Kalamata Mohana Rao |
| Srikakulam | 7 | Kotturu (ST) | INC | Viswasrai Narasimharao | TDP | Nimmaka Gopalarao |
| Vizianagaram | 8 | Naguru (ST) | INC | S. Chandrasekhara Raju | TDP | V. Pradeep Kumar Dev |
| Vizianagaram | 9 | Parvathipuram | INC | Sivunnaidu Mariserla | TDP | Yerra Krishna Murty |
| Vizianagaram | 10 | Salur (ST) | INC | Sanyasi Lakshmi Narasimha | TDP | R. P. Bhanj Dev |
| Vizianagaram | 11 | Bobbili | INC | Peddinti Jagan Mohana Rao | TDP | S. V. China Appala Naidu |
| Vizianagaram | 12 | Therlam | INC | Varada Ramrao Vasireddy | TDP | Tentu Jayaprakash |
| Srikakulam | 13 | Unukuru | INC | Palavalasa Rajasekharam | TDP | Kimidi Kalavenkata Rao |
| Srikakulam | 14 | Palakonda (SC) | INC | P. J. Amruta Kumari | TDP | Gondela Satteyya |
| Srikakulam | 15 | Amadalavalasa | INC | Pydi Sreerama Murty | TDP | Thammineni Sitharam |
| Srikakulam | 16 | Srikakulam | INC | Vandana Feshagiri Rao | TDP | Gunda Appala Suryanarayana |
| Srikakulam | 17 | Etcherla (SC) | INC | Boddepalli Narasimhulu | TDP | Kavali Pratiba Bharati |
| Vizianagaram | 18 | Cheepurupalli | INC | Meesala Neelakantam | TDP | Tankala Saraswatamma |
| Vizianagaram | 19 | Gajapathinagaram | INC | V. Narayanappalanaidu | TDP | Arunamma Padala |
| Vizianagaram | 20 | Vizianagaram | INC | K. Veerabhadra Swamy | TDP | Ashok Gajapathi Raju |
| Vizianagaram | 21 | Sathivada | INC | Penumatsa Sambasiva Raju | TDP | Potnuru Suryanarayana |
| Vizianagaram | 22 | Bhogapuram | INC | Kommuru Sanjeeva Rao | TDP | Pathivada Narayana Swamy |
| Visakhapatnam | 23 | Bheemunipatnam | Did not contest | | TDP | Devi Prasanna Narasimha |
| Visakhapatnam | 24 | Visakhapatnam-I | INC | Eati Vijayalaxmi | TDP | Bhattam Sriramamurty |
| Visakhapatnam | 25 | Visakhapatnam-II | INC | T. Suryanarayana Reddy | TDP | Kovvuri Gangi Reddy |
| Visakhapatnam | 26 | Pendurthi | INC | Gurunadharao Gudivada | TDP | Palla Simhachalam |
| Vizianagaram | 27 | Uttarapalli | INC | Dogga Sreeramulu Naidu | TDP | Appalanaidu Kolla |
| Vizianagaram | 28 | Srungavarapukota (ST) | INC | Ramchandra Rao Sagiri | TDP | Dukku Labudu Bariki |
| Visakhapatnam | 29 | Paderu (ST) | INC | Matsyarasa Balaraju | TDP | Venkataraju Matsyarasa |
| Visakhapatnam | 30 | Madugula | INC | Kuracha Ramunaidu | TDP | Reddi Satyanarayana |
| Visakhapatnam | 31 | Chodavaram | INC | Satya Rao Balireddy | TDP | Gunuru Yerrunaidu |
| Visakhapatnam | 32 | Anakapalli | INC | Dantuluri Dileep Kumar | TDP | Dadi Veera Bhadra Rao |
| Visakhapatnam | 33 | Paravada | INC | Yellapu Suryanarayana | TDP | B. Satyanarayana Murthy |
| Visakhapatnam | 34 | Elamanchili | INC | K. Satya Narayana Raju | TDP | Chalapati Rao Pappala |
| Visakhapatnam | 35 | Payakaraopeta (SC) | INC | Gautala Sumaua | TDP | Kakara Nookaraju |
| Visakhapatnam | 36 | Narsipatnam | INC | Krishnamurthyraju Raja Sagi | TDP | Ayyann Apatrudu Chintakayala |
| Visakhapatnam | 37 | Chintapalli (ST) | INC | Balaraju Pasupuleti | CPI | Korru Malayya |
| East Godavari | 38 | Yellavaram (ST) | INC | Ratnabai Tadapatla | TDP | Seethamsetti Venkateswara Rao |
| East Godavari | 39 | Burugupudi | INC | Appanna Dora Badireddy | TDP | Pendurti Sambasivarao |
| East Godavari | 40 | Rajahmundry | INC | A. C. Y. Reddy | TDP | Gorantla Butchiyya Chowdary |
| East Godavari | 41 | Kadiam | Did not contest | | TDP | Vaddi Veerabhadrarao |
| East Godavari | 42 | Jaggampeta | INC | Thota Venkatachalam | TDP | Thota Subbarao |
| East Godavari | 43 | Peddapuram | INC | Pantham Padmanabham | TDP | Boddu Bhaskara Rama Rao |
| East Godavari | 44 | Prathipadu | INC | Mudragada Padmanabham | TDP | Varupula Subba Rao |
| East Godavari | 45 | Tuni | INC | Raja Krishnam Raju Bahadur | TDP | Yanamala Rama Krishnudu |
| East Godavari | 46 | Pithapuram | INC | Koppana Venkata Mohanarao | TDP | Nageshwararao Venna |
| East Godavari | 47 | Sompara | INC | Anisettibulli Abbayee | TDP | Tirumani Satyalinganaicker |
| East Godavari | 48 | Kakinada | INC | Malladi Swami | TDP | Mootha Gopala Krishna |
| East Godavari | 49 | Tallarevu | INC | Merla Veeraiah Chowdary | TDP | Chikkala Ramachandra Rao |
| East Godavari | 50 | Anaparthy | INC | Rama Reddy Tetali | TDP | Moola Reddy Nallanilli |
| East Godavari | 51 | Ramachandrapuram | INC | Pilli Subhash Chandra Bose | TDP | Suryanarayanarao Kudipudi |
| East Godavari | 52 | Alamuru | INC | Sangitha Venkata Reddy | TDP | Narayana Murthy Valluri |
| East Godavari | 53 | Mummidivaram (SC) | INC | Battina Subbarao | TDP | Pandu Krishnamurty |
| East Godavari | 54 | Allavaram (SC) | INC | Veera Raghavulu Paramata | TDP | Gollapalli Suryarao |
| East Godavari | 55 | Amalapuram | INC | Kudupudi Prabhakara Rao | TDP | Metla Satyanarayana Rao |
| East Godavari | 56 | Kothapeta | INC | Chirla Somasundara Reddy | TDP | Bandaru Satyananda Rao |
| East Godavari | 57 | Nagaram (SC) | INC | Ganapathirao Neethupudi | TDP | Undru Krishna Rao |
| East Godavari | 58 | Razole | INC | Gangaiah Mangena | TDP | Alluru Surya Narayana Raju |
| West Godavari | 59 | Narasapur | INC | Polisetti Vasudeva Rao | TDP | Kothapalli Subbarayudu |
| West Godavari | 60 | Palakol | INC | Chegondi Venkata Jogaiah | TDP | Allu Venkata |
| West Godavari | 61 | Achanta (SC) | INC | Bhaskara Rao Kota | CPI(M) | Digupati Raja Gopal |
| West Godavari | 62 | Bhimavaram | INC | Alluri Subhas Chandra Bose | TDP | P. Venkata Narasimha Raju |
| West Godavari | 63 | Undi | INC | Danduboyina Perayyaa | TDP | Kalidindi Ramachjandra Raju |
| West Godavari | 64 | Penugonda | INC | Javvadi Sree Ranganayakulu | CPI | Vanka Satyuanarayana |
| West Godavari | 65 | Tanuku | INC | Chitturi Bapi Needu | TDP | Mullapudi Venkata Krishnarao |
| West Godavari | 66 | Attili | INC | Ramakrishnamraju Indukuri | TDP | Dandu Sivarama Raju |
| West Godavari | 67 | Tadepalligudem | INC | Eli Varalaxmi | TDP | Kanaka Sundara Rao Pasala |
| West Godavari | 68 | Ungutur | INC | Chava Ramakrushna Rao | TDP | Kantimani Srinivasarao |
| West Godavari | 69 | Dendulur | INC | Maganti Ravindra Nadha Ch. | TDP | Garapati Sambasiva Rao |
| West Godavari | 70 | Eluru | INC | Nerella Raja | TDP | Maradani Rangarao |
| West Godavari | 71 | Gopalapuram (SC) | Did not contest | | TDP | Vivekananda Karupati |
| West Godavari | 72 | Kovvur | INC | Md. Rafiulla Baig | TDP | Pendyala Venkata Krishnarao |
| West Godavari | 73 | Polavaram (ST) | INC | Badisa Durga Rao | TDP | Tellam Chinavaddi |
| West Godavari | 74 | Chintalapudi | INC | Mandalapu Satyanarayana | TDP | Kotagiri Vidyadher Rao |
| Krishna | 75 | Jaggayyapet | INC | Nageswara Rao Vasantha | TDP | Nettem Raghuram |
| Krishna | 76 | Nandigama | INC | Venkateswara Rao Mukkpati | TDP | Mullela Pullaiah Babu |
| Krishna | 77 | Vijayawada West | INC | M. K. Baig | CPI | Koraganji Chandrasekhara Rao |
| Krishna | 78 | Vijayawada East | INC | Vangaveeti Ratna Kumari | TDP | N.Sivaram Prasad |
| Krishna | 79 | Kankipadu | INC | Yalamanchili Nageswararao | TDP | Devineni Nehru |
| Krishna | 80 | Mylavaram | INC | Komati Bhaskara Rao | TDP | J.Yesta Ramesh Babu |
| Krishna | 81 | Tiruvuru (SC) | INC | Koneru Rangarao | TDP | Ravindranadu Kottapalli |
| Krishna | 82 | Nuzvid | INC | Venkatrao Paladugu | TDP | Rangayyappa Rao Meka |
| Krishna | 83 | Gannavaram | INC | Musunuru Ratna Bose | TDP | Mulpuru Bala Krishna Rao |
| Krishna | 84 | Vuyyur | INC | Vangaveeti Sobhana Rao | TDP | Anne Babu Rao |
| Krishna | 85 | Gudivada | INC | Eswara Kumar Katari | TDP | Ravi Sobhanadri Chowdary |
| Krishna | 86 | Mudinepalli | INC | Pinnamaneni Venkateswara Rao | TDP | Vallabhaneni Babu Rao |
| Krishna | 87 | Kaikalur | INC | Kanumuri Bapiraju | TDP | Yerneni Rajaram Chander |
| Krishna | 88 | Malleswaram | INC | Buragadda Vedavyas | TDP | Kagita Venkata Rao |
| Krishna | 89 | Bandar | INC | Perni Krishna Murthy | TDP | Nadakuditi Narsimha Rao |
| Krishna | 90 | Nidumolu (SC) | INC | Mupapneni Sobha Rani | CPI(M) | Ramaiah Patunu |
| Krishna | 91 | Avanigadda | INC | Mandali Venkata Krishna Rao | TDP | S. Satya Narayana Rao |
| Guntur | 92 | Kuchinapudi | INC | M. Venkata Ramana Rao | TDP | Ivuri Seetharamamma |
| Guntur | 93 | Repalle | INC | Ambati Rambabu | TDP | Mummaneni Venkata Subbaiah |
| Guntur | 94 | Vemuru | INC | Alapati Dharma Rao | TDP | Venkata Rao Yadlapati |
| Guntur | 95 | Duggirala | INC | Venkata Reddy Gudibandi | TDP | Balkoteswara Reddy Marreddy |
| Guntur | 96 | Tenali | INC | Nadendla Bhaskara Rao | TDP | Annabathuni Satya Narayana |
| Guntur | 97 | Ponnur | INC | Chittineni Venkata Rao | TDP | Dhulipalla Veeriaah Chowdary |
| Guntur | 98 | Bapatla | INC | Chirla Govardhana Reddy | TDP | Atchuta Rama Raju Penu Mtasa |
| Guntur | 99 | Prathipadu | INC | G.v. Appa Rao | TDP | Makineni Peda Rattaiah |
| Guntur | 100 | Guntur-I | INC | Mohammad Jani | TDP | Shaik Sayed Saheb |
| Guntur | 101 | Guntur-II | INC | Jayarambabu Chadalavada | TDP | Kilari Koteswara Rao |
| Guntur | 102 | Mangalagiri | INC | Goli Veeranjaneyulu | CPI(M) | Simhadri Siva Reddy |
| Guntur | 103 | Tadikonda (SC) | INC | Venkaiah Tiruvaipati | TDP | Ratna Pushparaju J. |
| Guntur | 104 | Sattenapalli | INC | Dodda Balakoti Reddy | CPI(M) | Puthumbaka Venkatapathi |
| Guntur | 105 | Pedakurapadu | INC | Kanna Lakshmi Narayana | TDP | Sadasiva Rao Kasaraneni |
| Guntur | 106 | Gurzala | INC | Kaviti Venkata Narsi Reddy | TDP | Sambasiva Rao Rachamadugu |
| Guntur | 107 | Macherla | INC | Nattuva Krishna Murthy | TDP | Nimmagadda Sivarama Prasad |
| Guntur | 108 | Vinukonda | INC | N. Raja Kumari | CPI | Venkateswara Rao Gangineni |
| Guntur | 109 | Narasaraopet | INC | M. Radhakrishna Murthy | TDP | Kodela Siva Prasadarao |
| Guntur | 110 | Chilakaluripet | INC | Somepalli Sambaiah | TDP | Kandimalla Jayamma |
| Prakasam | 111 | Chirala | INC | K. Rosaiah | TDP | Chimata Sambu |
| Prakasam | 112 | Parchur | Did not contest | | TDP | Venkateswara Rao Daggubati |
| Prakasam | 113 | Martur | INC | Gottipati Hanumantha Rao | TDP | Karnam Balarama Krishna Murthy |
| Prakasam | 114 | Addanki | INC | Raghavarao Jagarlamudi | TDP | Chenchu Garataiah Bvachina |
| Prakasam | 115 | Ongole | INC | Bachala Balaiah | TDP | Kamepalli Venkata Ramana Rao |
| Prakasam | 116 | Santhanuthalapadu (SC) | INC | Venkata Seshu Gurrala | CPI(M) | Tavanam Chenchaiah |
| Prakasam | 117 | Kandukur | INC | M. Maheedhar Reddy | TDP | Moruboyina Malakondaiah |
| Prakasam | 118 | Kanigiri | INC | Thirupathi Naidu Irigineni | TDP | Kasi Reddy Mukku |
| Prakasam | 119 | Kondepi | INC | Atchuta Kumar Gundpaneni | CPI | Sankaraiah Divi |
| Prakasam | 120 | Cumbum | INC | Kandula Nagarjuna Reddy | TDP | Venkata Reddy Udumala |
| Prakasam | 121 | Darsi | INC | Sanikommu Pitchireddy | TDP | Veginati Kotaiah |
| Prakasam | 122 | Markapur | INC | Pedda Konda Reddy Kunduru | TDP | Janke Venkata Reddy |
| Prakasam | 123 | Giddalur | INC | Venkatareddy Reddy Yalluri | TDP | Vijayakumar Reddy Pidathala |
| Nellore | 124 | Udayagiri | INC | Janakiram Madala | TDP | Kambham Vijayarami Reddy |
| Nellore | 125 | Kavali | INC | Kaliki Yanadi Reddy | TDP | Pathallapalli Vengala Rao |
| Nellore | 126 | Allur | INC | Katamreddy Vishnuvardhan | CPI(M) | Jakka Venkaiah |
| Nellore | 127 | Kovur | INC | N. Sreenivasul Reddy | TDP | Parireddy Bezawada |
| Nellore | 128 | Atmakur | INC | B. Sundara Rami Reddy | BJP | Karnati Anjaneya Reddy |
| Nellore | 129 | Rapur | INC | Rathanam Venkata Naidu | TDP | Anam Rammanarayana Reddy |
| Nellore | 130 | Nellore | INC | Koonam Venkata Subbareddy | TDP | Thallapaka Rameshreddy |
| Nellore | 131 | Sarvepalli | INC | Chitturu Venkata Seshareddy | TDP | Poondla Desaratharami Reddy |
| Nellore | 132 | Gudur (SC) | INC | Patra Prakasa Rao | TDP | Durga Prasadarao Balli |
| Nellore | 133 | Sulurpet (SC) | INC | Pasala Penchalaiah | TDP | Satti Prakasam |
| Nellore | 134 | Venkatagiri | INC | N. Janardhana Reddy | TDP | N. Chandra Sekhara Reddy |
| Chittoor | 135 | Sri Kalahasti | INC | Chenchu Reddy Tati Parthi | TDP | Gopala Krishna Reddy Bojjala |
| Chittoor | 136 | Satyavedu (SC) | INC | C. Doss | TDP | T. Manohar |
| Chittoor | 137 | Nagari | INC | Changa Reddy Reddivari | BJP | Chilakam Ramakrishnama Reddy |
| Chittoor | 138 | Puttur | INC | Bodireddy Ramakrishna Reddy | TDP | Gali Muddukrishnama Naidu |
| Chittoor | 139 | Vepanjeri (SC) | INC | Gummadi Kuthuhalamma | TDP | Talari Rudraiah |
| Chittoor | 140 | Chittoor | INC | R. Gopinathan | TDP | C. Hari Prasad |
| Chittoor | 141 | Palmaner (SC) | INC | P. R. Munaswamy | TDP | Patnam Subbaiah |
| Chittoor | 142 | Kuppam | INC | B. R. Doraswamy Naidu | TDP | N. Chandrababu Naidu |
| Chittoor | 143 | Punganur | INC | Reddivari Venugopal Reddy | TDP | N. Ramakrishna Reddy |
| Chittoor | 144 | Madanpalle | INC | Avula Mohan Reddy | TDP | Ratakonda Narayana Reddy |
| Chittoor | 145 | Thamballapalle | INC | T. N. Srinivasa Reddy | Did not contest | |
| Chittoor | 146 | Vayalpad | INC | Kiran Kumar Reddy | TDP | Chintala Ramachandra Reddy |
| Chittoor | 147 | Pileru | INC | P. Ramachandra Reddy | TDP | Challa Ramachandra Reddy |
| Chittoor | 148 | Chandragiri | INC | G. Aruna Kumari | TDP | N. R. Jayadeva Naidu |
| Chittoor | 149 | Tirupati | INC | Mabbu Rami Reddy | TDP | Kola Ramu |
| Kadapa | 150 | Kodur (SC) | INC | Kotapati Dhananjaya | TDP | Thoomati Penchalaiah |
| Kadapa | 151 | Rajampet | INC | Kasireddi Madhan Mohan Reddy | TDP | Kondur Prabhavathamma |
| Kadapa | 152 | Rayachoty | INC | Mandipalle Nagi Reddy | TDP | Palakondrayudu Sugavasi |
| Kadapa | 153 | Lakkireddipalli | INC | R. Raja Gopal Reddy | TDP | G. Mohan Reddy |
| Kadapa | 154 | Cuddapah | INC | K. Sivananda Reddy | TDP | M. Venkata Siva Reddy |
| Kadapa | 155 | Badvel | INC | W. Sivaramakrishna Rao | TDP | B. Veera Reddy |
| Kadapa | 156 | Mydukur | INC | D. L. Ravindra Reddy | TDP | S. Raghurami Reddy |
| Kadapa | 157 | Proddatur | INC | N. Varada Rajulu Reddy | TDP | Gandluru Krishna Reddy |
| Kadapa | 158 | Jammalamadugu | INC | M. Michael Vijaya Kumar | TDP | Ponnapu Sivareddy |
| Kadapa | 159 | Kamalapuram | INC | M. V. Mysura Reddy | TDP | Vaddamani Venkata Reddy |
| Kadapa | 160 | Pulivendula | INC | Y. S. Vivekananda Reddy | TDP | Jyoti Devi Reddy |
| Anantapur | 161 | Kadiri | INC | Mahammad Shakir | JD | Narasaiah Telaganeedi |
| Anantapur | 162 | Nallamada | INC | Veerappa Agisam | TDP | Venkatareddy Saddapalle |
| Anantapur | 163 | Gorantla | INC | Pamudurthi Ravindra Reddy | TDP | Kesanna |
| Anantapur | 164 | Hindupur | INC | G. Soma Sekhar | TDP | N. T. Rama Rao |
| Anantapur | 165 | Madakasira | INC | Raghu Veera Reddy | TDP | H. B. Narse Gowd |
| Anantapur | 166 | Penukonda | INC | S. Chandra Reddy | Did not contest | |
| Anantapur | 167 | Kalyandurg (SC) | INC | Lakshmi Devi M. | CPI | Sanjeevaiah V. |
| Anantapur | 168 | Rayadurg | INC | P. Venugopal Reddy | TDP | Kata Govindappa |
| Anantapur | 169 | Uravakonda | INC | V. Gopi Nath | TDP | Gurram Narayanappa |
| Anantapur | 170 | Gooty | INC | Arikeri Jagadeesh | TDP | Sainath Gowd |
| Anantapur | 171 | Singanamala (SC) | INC | P. Samanthakamani | TDP | B.C. Govindappa |
| Anantapur | 172 | Anantapur | INC | Bodimalla Narayana Reddy | TDP | Kammuri Saifulla |
| Anantapur | 173 | Dharmavaram | INC | Girraju Narayanaswamy | TDP | G. Nagi Reddy |
| Anantapur | 174 | Tadpatri | INC | J. C. Divakar Reddy | TDP | P. Nagi Reddy |
| Kurnool | 175 | Alur (SC) | INC | Gudlannagari Loknath | TDP | Ranigah |
| Kurnool | 176 | Adoni | INC | Rayachoti Ramaiah | TDP | Meenakshi Naidu |
| Kurnool | 177 | Yemmiganur | INC | M. S. Sivanna | TDP | B. V. Mohan Reddy |
| Kurnool | 178 | Kodumur (SC) | Did not contest | | TDP | M. Sikhamani |
| Kurnool | 179 | Kurnool | INC | V. Rama Bhupal Chowdry | CPI(M) | M. Abdul Gafoor |
| Kurnool | 180 | Pattikonda | INC | Pattelu Seshi Reddy | TDP | T. Huchappa |
| Kurnool | 181 | Dhone | INC | K. E. Krishna Murthy | TDP | Challa Rama Krishna Reddy |
| Kurnool | 182 | Koilkuntla | INC | S. V. Subba Reddy | TDP | Karra Subba Reddy |
| Kurnool | 183 | Allagadda | INC | Gangula Prathapa Reddi | TDP | Sekhara Reddi Bhuma |
| Kurnool | 184 | Panyam | INC | Katasani Ramabhupal Reddy | TDP | Satyanarayana Reddy Bijjem |
| Kurnool | 185 | Nandikotkur | INC | Byreddy Sesha Sayana Reddy | TDP | Ippala Thimma Reddy |
| Kurnool | 186 | Nandyal | INC | V. Ramanath Reddy | TDP | N. Farroq |
| Kurnool | 187 | Atmakur | INC | Budda Vegala Reddy | TDP | Siva Rami Reddy |
| Mahabubnagar | 188 | Achampet (SC) | INC | D. Kiran Kumar | TDP | P. Mahendranath |
| Mahabubnagar | 189 | Nagarkurnool | INC | Mohan Goud Vagna | TDP | Dyapa Gopal Reddy |
| Mahabubnagar | 190 | Kalwakurthi | INC | Chittaranjan Dass | TDP | N. T. Rama Rao |
| Mahabubnagar | 191 | Shadnagar (SC) | INC | P. Shankar Rao | TDP | M. Indira |
| Mahabubnagar | 192 | Jadcherla | INC | Sudhakar Reddy | TDP | M. Krishna Reddy |
| Mahabubnagar | 193 | Mahbubnagar | INC | Puli Veeranna | TDP | Chandrasekhar |
| Mahabubnagar | 194 | Wanaparthy | INC | G. Chinna Reddy | TDP | A. Bala Krishnaiah |
| Mahabubnagar | 195 | Kollapur | INC | Kotha Ramchandra Rao | CPI | Suravaram Sudhakar Reddy |
| Mahabubnagar | 196 | Alampur | INC | Rajani Babu | BJP | R. Ravindranath Reddy |
| Mahabubnagar | 197 | Gadwal | INC | D. K. Samara Simha Reddy | TDP | Challa Venkatrami Reddy |
| Mahabubnagar | 198 | Amarchinta | INC | Veerareddy | TDP | Dayakar Reddy |
| Mahabubnagar | 199 | Makthal | Did not contest | | JD | Chittem Narsi Reddy |
| Mahabubnagar | 200 | Kodangal | INC | Gurunath Reddy | TDP | Ratanlal Lahoti |
| Ranga Reddy | 201 | Tandur | INC | M. Chandra Shaker | TDP | Pasaram Shanth Kumar |
| Ranga Reddy | 202 | Vicarabad (SC) | INC | Tirmalaiah | TDP | A. Chandrasekhar |
| Ranga Reddy | 203 | Pargi | INC | Kamatam Ram Reddy | TDP | Koppula Harishwar Reddy |
| Ranga Reddy | 204 | Chevella | INC | Kondakalla Kantha Reddy | TDP | P. Indra Reddy |
| Ranga Reddy | 205 | Ibrahimpatnam (SC) | INC | A. G. Krishna | CPI(M) | Kondigari Ramulu |
| Hyderabad | 206 | Musheerabad | INC | M. Kodanda Reddy | JD | Nayani Narasimha Reddy |
| Hyderabad | 207 | Himayatnagar | INC | Hanumantha Rao | BJP | Ale Narendra |
| Hyderabad | 208 | Sanathnagar | INC | Marri Chenna Reddy | TDP | S. Rajeshwar |
| Hyderabad | 209 | Secunderabad | INC | Mary Ravindra Nath | TDP | Alladi Raj Kumar |
| Hyderabad | 210 | Khairatabad | INC | P. Janardhan Reddy | TDP | M. Narayana Swamy |
| Hyderabad | 211 | Secunderabad Cant. (SC) | INC | D. Narsinga Rao | TDP | N. A. Krishna |
| Hyderabad | 212 | Malakpet | INC | P. Sudhir Kumar | BJP | N. Indrasena Reddy |
| Hyderabad | 213 | Asafnagar | INC | Danam Nagender | TDP | Ch. Yadagiri Gowd |
| Hyderabad | 214 | Maharajgunj | INC | Mukesh Goud | BJP | Bandaru Dattatreya |
| Hyderabad | 215 | Karwan | INC | G. Ravi | BJP | Baddam Bal Reddy |
| Hyderabad | 216 | Yakutpura | INC | Ali Raza | TDP | M. A. Rasheed Khan |
| Hyderabad | 217 | Chandrayangutta | INC | K. S. Santosh | TDP | P. Brahmananda Chary |
| Hyderabad | 218 | Charminar | INC | Manoj Pershad | TDP | Mir Yousuf Ali |
| Ranga Reddy | 219 | Medchal | INC | Singireddy Uma Reddy | TDP | K. Surender Reddy |
| Medak | 220 | Siddipet | INC | A. Madan Mohan | TDP | K. Chandrashekar Rao |
| Medak | 221 | Dommat | INC | M. Rangareddy | TDP | Cheruku Mutyam Reddy |
| Medak | 222 | Gajwel (SC) | INC | J. Geeta Reddy | TDP | B. Sanjeeva Rao |
| Medak | 223 | Narsapur | INC | C. Jagannatha Rao | CPI | Chilumula Vittal Reddy |
| Medak | 224 | Sangareddy | INC | P. Ramachandra Reddy | TDP | R. Srinivas Goud |
| Medak | 225 | Zahirabad | INC | Patlolla Narsimha Reddy | TDP | Ramlingam Dasarath Reddy |
| Medak | 226 | Narayankhed | INC | Patlolla Kishta Reddy | TDP | M. Venkatreddy |
| Medak | 227 | Medak | INC | Patlolla Narayana Reddy | TDP | Karanam Ramachandra Rao |
| Medak | 228 | Ramayampet | INC | Anthireddigari Vittal Reddy | BJP | R. S. Vasureddy |
| Medak | 229 | Andole (SC) | INC | Damodar Raja Narasimha | TDP | Malyala Rajaiah |
| Nizamabad | 230 | Balkonda | INC | K. R. Suresh Reddy | TDP | Mothe Ganga Reddy |
| Nizamabad | 231 | Armoor | INC | Sanigaram Santosh Reddy | TDP | Vemula Serender Reddy |
| Nizamabad | 232 | Kamareddy | INC | Md. Ali Shabbir | TDP | Syed Yousuf Ali |
| Nizamabad | 233 | Yellareddy | INC | Taduri Bheema Goud | TDP | Anjaneyulu Neralla |
| Nizamabad | 234 | Jukkal (SC) | INC | Kodapgal Gangaram | TDP | Srinivas Kale |
| Nizamabad | 235 | Banswada | INC | Reddygari Venkatarama Reddy | TDP | Kathera Gangadhar |
| Nizamabad | 236 | Bodhan | INC | P. Sudarshan Reddy | TDP | Kotha Ramakanth |
| Nizamabad | 237 | Nizamabad | INC | D. Srinavas | TDP | D. Satyanarayana |
| Nizamabad | 238 | Dichpally | INC | N. L. Narayana | TDP | M. Venkateshwata Rao |
| Adilabad | 239 | Mudhole | INC | G. Gaddenna | TDP | Vithal |
| Adilabad | 240 | Nirmal | INC | Aindla Bheem Reddy | TDP | S. Venugopal Chary |
| Adilabad | 241 | Boath (SC) | INC | Amar Singh Tilawat | TDP | Ghodam Rama Rao |
| Adilabad | 242 | Adilabad | INC | Chilkuri Ramchandra Reddy | TDP | Kunta Chandrakanth Reddy |
| Adilabad | 243 | Khanapur (ST) | INC | Kotnak Bhim Rao | TDP | Govind Naik |
| Adilabad | 244 | Asifabad (SC) | INC | Dasari Narasaiah | CPI | Gunda Mallesh |
| Adilabad | 245 | Luxettipet | INC | G. V. Sudhakar Rao | TDP | Kalakuntla Surender Rao |
| Adilabad | 246 | Sirpur | INC | Md. Sultan Ahmed | TDP | Kodali V. Narayana Rao |
| Adilabad | 247 | Chinnur (SC) | INC | K. Pradeep | TDP | Boda Janardhan |
| Karimnagar | 248 | Manthani | INC | D. Sripada Rao | TDP | Bellamkonda Sakku Bai |
| Karimnagar | 249 | Peddapalli | INC | Geetla Mukunda Reddy | TDP | Birudu Rajamallu |
| Karimnagar | 250 | Myadaram (SC) | INC | Mathagi Narsaiah | TDP | Malem Mallesham |
| Karimnagar | 251 | Huzurabad | INC | Vodithela Rajeshwar Rao | TDP | Duggirala Venkat Rao |
| Karimnagar | 252 | Kamalapur | INC | Lingampalli Veera Reddy | TDP | M. Damodar Reddy |
| Karimnagar | 253 | Indurthi | INC | Bomma Venkateshwar | CPI | Malllaiah Deshini Chinna |
| Karimnagar | 254 | Karimnagar | INC | Meneni Satyanarayan Rao | TDP | Juvvadi Chandrasekhar Rao |
| Karimnagar | 255 | Choppadandi | INC | Koduri Satyanarayana | TDP | N. Ramkishan Rao |
| Karimnagar | 256 | Jagtial | INC | T. Jeevan Reddy | TDP | G. Rajesham Goud |
| Karimnagar | 257 | Buggaram | INC | T. Bheemsen | TDP | Gandra Venkateshwar Rao |
| Karimnagar | 258 | Metpalli | INC | Miryala Kishan Rao | BJP | C. Vidyasagar Rao |
| Karimnagar | 259 | Sircilla | INC | J. Narsingha Rao | CPI | Ch. Rajeshwar Rao |
| Karimnagar | 260 | Narella (SC) | INC | Pati Rajam | JD | Uppari Sambaiah |
| Warangal | 261 | Cheriyal | INC | Nagapuri Rajalingam | TDP | Nimma Raja Reddy |
| Warangal | 262 | Jangaon | INC | Ponnala Lakshmaiah | CPI(M) | Ch. Raja Reddy |
| Warangal | 263 | Chennur | INC | K. Madhusudhan Reddy | TDP | N. Yethi Raja Rao |
| Warangal | 264 | Dornakal | INC | Dharamsoth Redya Naik | TDP | Satyavathi Rathod |
| Warangal | 265 | Mahbubabad | INC | J. Janardhan Reddy | CPI | Bandi Pullaiah |
| Warangal | 266 | Narsampet | INC | Epur Janardhan Reddy | TDP | Beeram Sanjeeva Reddy |
| Warangal | 267 | Wardhannapet | INC | Varada Rajeshwar Rao | BJP | Takkallapalli Rajeshwar Rao |
| Warangal | 268 | Ghanpur (SC) | INC | Bohnagiri Arogyam | TDP | Bojjapalli Rajaiah |
| Warangal | 269 | Warangal | INC | T. Purushothama Rao | TDP | B. Nagabhushana Rao |
| Warangal | 270 | Hanamkonda | INC | P. V. Ranga Rao | TDP | Dasyam Pranay Bhasker |
| Warangal | 271 | Shyampet | INC | Madadi Narasiamha Reddy | BJP | Manda Ailaiah |
| Warangal | 272 | Parkal (SC) | INC | Sammaiah Bochu | BJP | Jayapal Vonteru |
| Warangal | 273 | Mulug (ST) | INC | P. Jagan Naik | TDP | Azmeera Chandulal |
| Khammam | 274 | Bhadrachalam (ST) | INC | Suseela Dungurothu | CPI(M) | Kunja Bojji |
| Khammam | 275 | Burgampahad (ST) | INC | Chanda Lingaiah | CPI | Biksham Kunja |
| Khammam | 276 | Kothagudem | INC | Vanama V. Rao | TDP | Koneru Nageswara Rao |
| Khammam | 277 | Sathupalli | INC | Jalagam Prasada Rao | TDP | Thummala Nageswara Rao |
| Khammam | 278 | Madhira | INC | Seemlam Siddha Reddy | CPI(M) | B. Venkateswara Rao |
| Khammam | 279 | Palair (SC) | INC | Sambani Chandrashekar | CPI(M) | Hanmanthu Baji |
| Khammam | 280 | Khammam | INC | K. Durga Narasiamha Rao | CPI | Puvvada Nageswar Rao |
| Khammam | 281 | Shujatnagar | INC | Venkata Ramreddy | CPI | Md. Rajab Ali |
| Khammam | 282 | Yellandu (ST) | INC | Banoth Somla Naiak | CPI | Vooke Abbaiah |
| Nalgonda | 283 | Tungaturthi | INC | Ramreddy Damodar Reddy | CPI(M) | Mallu Swarajyam |
| Nalgonda | 284 | Suryapet (SC) | INC | Eda Devaiah | TDP | Akram Sudarshan |
| Nalgonda | 285 | Kodad | INC | V. Laxminarayana Rao | TDP | Venepalli Chandar Rao |
| Nalgonda | 286 | Miryalguda | INC | Vijayasimha Reddy | CPI(M) | Arabandi Laxninarayana |
| Nalgonda | 287 | Chalakurthi | INC | Kunduru Jana Reddy | TDP | Gopagani Peda Narsaiah |
| Nalgonda | 288 | Nakrekal | INC | Gurram V. Reddy | CPI(M) | Narra Raghava Reddy |
| Nalgonda | 289 | Nalgonda | INC | Gutta Mohan Reddy | TDP | Malreddy Raghuma Reddy |
| Nalgonda | 290 | Ramanapet | INC | V. Purushotham Reddy | CPI | Gurram Yadagiri Reddy |
| Nalgonda | 291 | Alair (SC) | Did not contest | | TDP | Yadagi Basani Sunnam |
| Nalgonda | 292 | Bhongir | INC | Gardasu Balaiah | TDP | A. Madhava Reddy |
| Nalgonda | 293 | Mungode | INC | Palvai Govardhan Reddy | CPI | Vujjini Narayan Rao |
| Nalgonda | 294 | Deverkonda (ST) | INC | D. Bagya Naik | CPI | Mood Baddhu Chowhan |

== Results ==
=== Vote share ===
Vote share by party
1. Indian National Congress (47.1%)
2. Telugu Desam Party (36.5%)
3. Communist Party of India (2.64%)
4. Communist Party of India (Marxist) (2.46%)
5. Bharatiya Janata Party (1.78%)
6. Others (9.49%)

=== Seat share ===
Seat share by party
1. Indian National Congress (61.6%)
2. Telugu Desam Party (25.2%)
3. Communist Party of India (2.72%)
4. Communist Party of India (Marxist) (2.04%)
5. Bharatiya Janata Party (1.70%)
6. Others (6.80%)

=== Results by party ===
Source: Election Commission of India
| Alliance/Party | | Popular vote | | | Seats | | |
| Alliance/Party | | Votes | % | ±pp | Contested | Won | +/− |
|---|---|---|---|---|---|---|---|
| Indian National Congress | | 13,539,785 | 47.09 | ▲9.84 | 287 | 181 | ▲131 |
| National Front | Telugu Desam Party | 10,506,982 | 36.54 | ▼9.67 | 241 | 74 | ▼128 |
| National Front | Communist Party of India | 758,770 | 2.64 | ▼0.05 | 19 | 8 | ▼3 |
| National Front | Communist Party of India (Marxist) | 707,686 | 2.46 | ▲0.15 | 15 | 6 | ▼5 |
| National Front | Bharatiya Janata Party | 512,305 | 1.78 | ▲0.16 | 12 | 5 | ▼3 |
| National Front | Janata Dal | 107,398 | 0.37 | new | 4 | 1 | new |
| National Front | Total | 12,593,141 | 43.79 | N/A | 291 | 94 | N/A |
| Other parties | | 724,869 | 2.54 | N/A | 180 | 4 | N/A |
| Independents | | 1,893,156 | 6.58 | ▼2.52 | 946 | 15 | ▲6 |
| Total | | 28,750,951 | 100.00 | N/A | 1,704 | 294 | N/A |
Vote statistics
| Valid votes | | 28,750,951 | 96.16 | | | | |
| Invalid votes | | 1,148,579 | 3.84 | | | | |
| Votes cast/ turnout | | 29,899,530 | 70.44 | | | | |
| Abstentions | | 12,549,275 | 29.56 | | | | |
| Registered voters | | 42,448,805 | | | | | |

=== Results by district ===
| District | Seats | | | |
| District | Seats | TDP+ | INC | OTH |
| Srikakulam | 12 | 7 | 3 | 2 |
| Vizianagaram | 12 | 8 | 4 | 0 |
| Visakhapatnam | 13 | 6 | 7 | 0 |
| East Godavari | 21 | 4 | 16 | 1 |
| West Godavari | 16 | 9 | 7 | 0 |
| Krishna | 17 | 4 | 13 | 0 |
| Guntur | 19 | 5 | 12 | 0 |
| Prakasam | 13 | 2 | 11 | 0 |
| Nellore | 11 | 0 | 10 | 1 |
| Chittoor | 15 | 5 | 8 | 2 |
| Kadapa | 11 | 2 | 9 | 0 |
| Anantapur | 14 | 2 | 12 | 0 |
| Kurnool | 13 | 3 | 9 | 1 |
| Mahbubnagar | 13 | 2 | 11 | 0 |
| Ranga Reddy | 6 | 3 | 3 | 0 |
| Hyderabad | 13 | 2 | 7 | 4 |
| Medak | 10 | 3 | 7 | 0 |
| Nizamabad | 9 | 4 | 5 | 0 |
| Adilabad | 9 | 3 | 5 | 1 |
| Karimnagar | 13 | 4 | 6 | 3 |
| Warangal | 13 | 4 | 8 | 1 |
| Khammam | 9 | 5 | 3 | 1 |
| Nalgonda | 12 | 8 | 3 | 1 |
| Total | 294 | 181 | 94 | 19 |

=== Results by constituency ===
| District | Constituency | | Winner | | | | Runner Up | | | | Margin |
| District | # | Name | Candidate | Party | Votes | % | Candidate | Party | Votes | % | Margin |
|---|---|---|---|---|---|---|---|---|---|---|---|
| Srikakulam | 1 | Ichchapuram | Mandava Venkata Krishna Rao | TDP | 46,984 | 60.65 | Buddala Trinadha Reddy | INC(I) | 30,485 | 39.35 | 16,499 |
| Srikakulam | 2 | Sompeta | Gouthu Syam Sunder Sivaji | IND | 34,923 | 40.97 | Majji Narayana Rao | INC(I) | 31,022 | 36.39 | 3,901 |
| Srikakulam | 3 | Tekkali | Duvvada Nagavali | TDP | 44,272 | 51.57 | Sattaru Lokanadham Naidu | INC(I) | 36,838 | 42.91 | 7,434 |
| Srikakulam | 4 | Harishchandrapuram | Kinjarapu Yerran Naidu | IND | 45,651 | 50.61 | Kannepalli Appalanarasimha Bhukta | INC(I) | 26,834 | 29.75 | 18,817 |
| Srikakulam | 5 | Narasannapeta | Dharmana Prasada Rao | INC(I) | 50,580 | 58.63 | Simma Prabhakara Rao | TDP | 35,688 | 41.37 | 14,892 |
| Srikakulam | 6 | Pathapatnam | Kalamata Mohana Rao | TDP | 41,040 | 49.81 | Dharmana Narayana Rao | INC(I) | 40,766 | 49.47 | 274 |
| Srikakulam | 7 | Kothuru (ST) | Nimmaka Gopala Rao | TDP | 41,190 | 50.55 | Viswasarayi Narasimha Rao | INC(I) | 39,451 | 48.42 | 1,739 |
| Vizianagaram | 8 | Naguru (ST) | Satrucharla Vijaya Rama Raju | INC(I) | 38,456 | 50.74 | Vyricharla Pradeep Kumar Dev | TDP | 35,021 | 46.21 | 3,435 |
| Vizianagaram | 9 | Parvathipuram | Yerra Krishna Murty | TDP | 42,555 | 51.63 | Mariserla Sivunnaidu | INC(I) | 39,866 | 48.37 | 2,689 |
| Vizianagaram | 10 | Salur (ST) | Lakshmi Narasimha Sanyasi Raju | INC(I) | 35,823 | 49.61 | Rajendra Prathap Bhanj Deo | TDP | 35,182 | 48.73 | 641 |
| Vizianagaram | 11 | Bobbili | Jagan Mohana Rao Peddinti | INC(I) | 41,809 | 49.53 | S. V. China Appala Naidu | TDP | 41,711 | 49.41 | 98 |
| Vizianagaram | 12 | Therlam | Thentu Jayaprakash | TDP | 49,206 | 54.31 | Vasireddy Varada Rama Rao | INC(I) | 41,400 | 45.69 | 7,806 |
| Srikakulam | 13 | Vunukuru | Kimidi Kalavenkata Rao | TDP | 49,612 | 51.15 | Palavalasa Rajasekharam | INC(I) | 47,375 | 48.85 | 2,237 |
| Srikakulam | 14 | Palakonda (SC) | P.J.Amrutha Kumari | INC(I) | 35,027 | 49.75 | Gondela Satteyya | TDP | 33,852 | 48.09 | 1,175 |
| Srikakulam | 15 | Amadalavalasa | Pydi Sreerama Murty | INC(I) | 40,879 | 49.39 | Thammineni Seetharam | TDP | 37,383 | 45.17 | 3,496 |
| Srikakulam | 16 | Srikakulam | Gunda Appala Suryanarayana | TDP | 52,766 | 52.86 | Vandana Seshagiri Rao | INC(I) | 47,055 | 47.14 | 5,711 |
| Srikakulam | 17 | Etcherla (SC) | K. Pratibha Bharati | TDP | 46,883 | 58.99 | Boddepalli Narasimhulu | INC(I) | 28,302 | 35.61 | 18,581 |
| Vizianagaram | 18 | Cheepurupalli | Tankala Saraswatamma | TDP | 49,121 | 55.41 | Meesala Neeelakantam | INC(I) | 38,089 | 42.96 | 11,032 |
| Vizianagaram | 19 | Gajapathinagaram | Padala Aruna | TDP | 34,321 | 40.63 | Taddi Sanyasi Naidu | IND | 26,735 | 31.65 | 7,586 |
| Vizianagaram | 20 | Vizianagaram | Ashok Gajapathi Raju | TDP | 50,224 | 55.37 | Kolagatla Veerabhadra Swamy | INC(I) | 40,477 | 44.63 | 9,747 |
| Vizianagaram | 21 | Sathivada | Penumatsa Sambasiva Raju | INC(I) | 48,646 | 51.90 | Potnuru Suryanarayana | TDP | 45,090 | 48.10 | 3,556 |
| Vizianagaram | 22 | Bhogapuram | Pathivada Narayanaswamy Naidu | TDP | 41,485 | 51.62 | Kommuru Appadudora | INC(I) | 38,886 | 48.38 | 2,599 |
| Visakhapatnam | 23 | Bheemunipatnam | Rajasagi Devi Prasanna Aprala Narasimha Raju | TDP | 58,808 | 65.99 | Kakarlapudi Veera Ventaka Suryanarayana Raju | IND | 26,594 | 29.84 | 32,214 |
| Visakhapatnam | 24 | Visakhapatnam-I | Eati Vijayalaxmi | INC(I) | 39,387 | 60.18 | Bhattu Seetharama Murthy | TDP | 25,049 | 38.27 | 14,338 |
| Visakhapatnam | 25 | Visakhapatnam-II | Thondapu Surayanarayana Reddy | INC(I) | 86,464 | 60.58 | Kovvuri Gangi Reddy | TDP | 55,317 | 38.76 | 31,147 |
| Visakhapatnam | 26 | Pendurthi | Gudivada Gurunadha Rao | INC(I) | 83,380 | 53.34 | Palla Simhachalam | TDP | 69,477 | 44.45 | 13,903 |
| Vizianagaram | 27 | Uttarapalli | Kolla Appalanaidu | TDP | 39,508 | 49.82 | Boddu Suryanarayana | IND | 26,452 | 33.36 | 13,056 |
| Vizianagaram | 28 | Srungavarapukota (ST) | Dukku Labudu Bariki | TDP | 46,719 | 53.89 | Sagiri Ramachandra Rao | INC(I) | 39,973 | 46.11 | 6,746 |
| Visakhapatnam | 29 | Paderu (ST) | Matsyarasa Balaraju | INC(I) | 27,501 | 56.96 | Matsyarasa Venkataraju | TDP | 13,037 | 27.00 | 14,464 |
| Visakhapatnam | 30 | Madugula | Reddi Satyanarayana | TDP | 48,872 | 55.75 | Kuracha Ramunaidu | INC(I) | 38,788 | 44.25 | 10,084 |
| Visakhapatnam | 31 | Chodavaram | Balireddy Satya Rao | INC(I) | 53,274 | 53.80 | Gumuru Yerru Naidu | TDP | 43,531 | 43.96 | 9,743 |
| Visakhapatnam | 32 | Anakapalli | Dadi Veerabhadra Rao | TDP | 46,287 | 50.76 | Dantuluri Dileep Kumar | INC(I) | 44,029 | 48.28 | 2,258 |
| Visakhapatnam | 33 | Paravada | Bandaru Satyanarayana Murthy | TDP | 44,484 | 51.33 | Yellapu Venkata Suryanarayana | INC(I) | 30,966 | 35.73 | 13,518 |
| Visakhapatnam | 34 | Elamanchili | Pappala Chalapathirao | TDP | 40,286 | 44.48 | Veesam Sanyasi Naidu | IND | 28,032 | 30.95 | 12,254 |
| Visakhapatnam | 35 | Payakaraopet (SC) | Kakara Nookaraju | TDP | 38,764 | 51.47 | Gantela Sumana | INC(I) | 35,486 | 47.11 | 3,278 |
| Visakhapatnam | 36 | Narsipatnam | Sagi Krishnamurthy Raju | INC(I) | 53,818 | 54.56 | Chintakayala Ayyanna Patrudu | TDP | 42,863 | 43.45 | 10,955 |
| Visakhapatnam | 37 | Chintapalle (ST) | Pasupulati Balaraju | INC(I) | 29,349 | 43.24 | Korru Malayya | CPI | 27,350 | 40.29 | 1,999 |
| East Godavari | 38 | Yellavaram (ST) | Seethamsetti Venkateswara Rao | TDP | 25,405 | 39.66 | Tadapatla Ratnabhai | INC(I) | 22,539 | 35.18 | 2,866 |
| East Godavari | 39 | Burugupudi | Badireddy Appana Dora | INC(I) | 53,291 | 53.72 | Pendurthi Sambasiva Rao | TDP | 43,226 | 43.57 | 10,065 |
| East Godavari | 40 | Rajahmundry | A.C.Y. Reddy | INC(I) | 52,821 | 56.58 | Gorantla Butchaiah Chowdary | TDP | 39,679 | 42.51 | 13,142 |
| East Godavari | 41 | Kadiam | Jakkampudi Rammohan Rao | IND | 60,576 | 49.00 | Vaddi Veerabhadrarao | TDP | 59,946 | 48.49 | 630 |
| East Godavari | 42 | Jaggampeta | Thota Subbarao | TDP | 49,504 | 50.24 | Thota Venkatachalam | INC(I) | 45,969 | 45.69 | 3,535 |
| East Godavari | 43 | Peddapuram | Pantham Padmnabham | INC(I) | 56,237 | 58.49 | Boddu Bhaskara Rama Rao | TDP | 38,348 | 39.89 | 17,889 |
| East Godavari | 44 | Prathipadu (East Godavari) | Mudragada Padmanabham | INC(I) | 58,567 | 53.74 | Varapula Subbarao | TDP | 45,725 | 41.95 | 12,842 |
| East Godavari | 45 | Tuni | Yanamala Rama Krishnudu | TDP | 51,139 | 50.26 | Sri Raju Vatsavayi Krishnam Raju Bahadur | INC(I) | 48,512 | 47.68 | 2,627 |
| East Godavari | 46 | Pithapuram | Koppana Venkata Chandra Mohan Rao | INC(I) | 42,241 | 52.29 | Venna Nageswararao | TDP | 35,987 | 44.55 | 6,254 |
| East Godavari | 47 | Sampara | Anisetti Bullabbayi | INC(I) | 53,596 | 49.27 | Thirumani Satyalinga Nayaker | TDP | 48,629 | 44.70 | 4,967 |
| East Godavari | 48 | Kakinada | Malladi Swami | INC(I) | 65,943 | 61.38 | Mootha Gopala Krishna Murthy | TDP | 39,996 | 37.23 | 25,947 |
| East Godavari | 49 | Tallarevu | Chikkala Ramachandra Rao | TDP | 51,753 | 55.08 | Merla Veeraiah Chowdary | INC(I) | 40,814 | 43.43 | 10,939 |
| East Godavari | 50 | Anaparthy | Tetali Rama Reddy | INC(I) | 48,711 | 53.67 | Nallamilli Moola Reddy | TDP | 41,073 | 45.26 | 7,638 |
| East Godavari | 51 | Ramachandrapuram | Pilli Subhash Chandra Bose | INC(I) | 53,326 | 58.29 | Kudipudi Suryanarayana Rao | TDP | 35,164 | 38.44 | 18,162 |
| East Godavari | 52 | Alamuru | Sangita Venkatareddy | INC(I) | 52,687 | 49.94 | Valluri Narayanamurthy | TDP | 51,709 | 49.01 | 978 |
| East Godavari | 53 | Mummidivaram (SC) | Battina Subbarao | INC(I) | 47,989 | 51.87 | Pandu Krishnamurty | TDP | 41,240 | 44.58 | 6,749 |
| East Godavari | 54 | Allavaram (SC) | Paramata Veera Raghavaulu | INC(I) | 39,486 | 49.23 | Gollapalli Suryarao | TDP | 37,986 | 47.36 | 1,500 |
| East Godavari | 55 | Amalapuram | Kudupudi Prabhakar Rao | INC(I) | 45,863 | 51.42 | Satyanarayana Rao | TDP | 41,590 | 46.63 | 4,273 |
| East Godavari | 56 | Kothapeta | Chirla Soma Sundara Reddy | INC(I) | 53,431 | 56.54 | Bandaru Satyananda Rao | TDP | 53,431 | 43.46 | 12,355 |
| East Godavari | 57 | Nagaram (SC) | Neethipudi Ganapathi Rao | INC(I) | 45,136 | 51.97 | Undru Krishna Rao | TDP | 40,660 | 46.81 | 4,476 |
| East Godavari | 58 | Razole | Mangena Gangaiah | INC(I) | 46,413 | 50.02 | Alluri Venkata Surya Narayana Raju | TDP | 45,802 | 49.36 | 611 |
| West Godavari | 59 | Narasapuram | Kothapalli Subbarayudu | TDP | 56,639 | 55.02 | Polisetti Vasudeva Rao | INC(I) | 43,438 | 42.20 | 13,201 |
| West Godavari | 60 | Palacole | Chegondi Harirama Jogaiah | INC(I) | 43,973 | 49.70 | Allu Venkata Satyanarayana | TDP | 42,579 | 48.13 | 1,394 |
| West Godavari | 61 | Achanta (SC) | Digupati Raja Gopal | CPI(M) | 46,641 | 53.08 | Kota Bhaskara Rao | INC(I) | 38,242 | 43.52 | 8,399 |
| West Godavari | 62 | Bhimavaram | Alluri Subhash Chandra Bose | INC(I) | 53,499 | 51.05 | Penmetsa Venkata Narasimha Raju | TDP | 50,125 | 47.83 | 3,374 |
| West Godavari | 63 | Undi | Kalidindi Ramachandra Raju | TDP | 52,141 | 52.43 | Danduboyina Perayyaa | INC(I) | 46,858 | 47.12 | 5,283 |
| West Godavari | 64 | Penugonda | Javvadi Sree Ranganayakulu | INC(I) | 46,904 | 53.86 | Vanka Satyanarayana | CPI | 38,518 | 44.23 | 8,386 |
| West Godavari | 65 | Tanuku | Mullapudi Venkata Krishnarao | TDP | 57,050 | 53.27 | Chitturi Bapi Needu | INC(I) | 47,669 | 44.51 | 9,381 |
| West Godavari | 66 | Attili | Dandu Sivarama Raju | TDP | 46,640 | 50.01 | Indukuri Ramakrishnamraju | INC(I) | 45,529 | 48.82 | 1,111 |
| West Godavari | 67 | Tadepalligudem | Pasala Kanaka Sundar Rao | TDP | 54,938 | 50.61 | Eli Varalakshmi | INC(I) | 53,342 | 49.14 | 1,596 |
| West Godavari | 68 | Ungutur | Chava Ramakrishna Rao | INC(I) | 68,389 | 57.63 | Kantamani Srinivasa Rao | TDP | 48,285 | 40.69 | 20,104 |
| West Godavari | 69 | Dendulur | Maganti Ravindranadh Chowdary | INC(I) | 59,099 | 58.91 | Garapati Sambasiva Rao | TDP | 40,605 | 40.48 | 18,494 |
| West Godavari | 70 | Eluru | Nerella Raja | INC(I) | 54,414 | 51.04 | Maradani Rangarao | TDP | 50,075 | 46.97 | 4,339 |
| West Godavari | 71 | Gopalpuram (SC) | Karupati Vivekananda | TDP | 50,411 | 52.59 | Dake Abhimanyudu | IND | 42,559 | 44.40 | 7,852 |
| West Godavari | 72 | Kovvur | Pendyala Venkata Krishna Rao | TDP | 60,116 | 52.85 | Md Rafiualla Baig | INC(I) | 52,824 | 46.44 | 7,292 |
| West Godavari | 73 | Polavaram (ST) | Badisa Durga Rao | INC(I) | 42,673 | 46.78 | Tellam chinavaddi | TDP | 39,859 | 43.69 | 2,814 |
| West Godavari | 74 | Chintalapudi | Kotagiri Vidyadhara Rao | TDP | 59,651 | 52.89 | Mandalapu Satyanarayana | INC(I) | 52,445 | 46.50 | 7,206 |
| Krishna | 75 | Jaggayyapet | Nettem Raghuram | TDP | 51,107 | 50.50 | Vasantha Nageswara Rao | INC(I) | 49,419 | 48.83 | 1,688 |
| Krishna | 76 | Nandigama | Mukkapati Venkateswara Rao | INC(I) | 51,421 | 50.63 | Mullela Pullaiah Babu | TDP | 49,008 | 48.25 | 2,413 |
| Krishna | 77 | Vijayawada West | M.K.Baig | INC(I) | 63,401 | 57.41 | Koraganji Chandrasekhara Rao | CPI | 45,201 | 40.93 | 18,200 |
| Krishna | 78 | Vijayawada East | Vangaveeti Ratna Kumari | INC(I) | 68,301 | 60.85 | N.Sivaram Prasad | TDP | 42,973 | 38.29 | 25,328 |
| Krishna | 79 | Kankipadu | Devineni Nehru | TDP | 79,975 | 51.15 | Yalamanchili Nageswararao | INC(I) | 75,153 | 45.06 | 4,822 |
| Krishna | 80 | Mylavaram | Komati Bhaskara Rao | INC(I) | 54,613 | 47.97 | J.Yesta Ramesh Babu | TDP | 53,480 | 46.96 | 1,133 |
| Krishna | 81 | Tiruvuru (SC) | Koneru Ranga Rao | INC(I) | 55,016 | 50.11 | Kothapalli Ravindrababu | TDP | 53,021 | 48.29 | 1,995 |
| Krishna | 82 | Nuzvid | Paladugu Venkat Rao | INC(I) | 60,378 | 50.95 | Meka Rangayyappa Rao | TDP | 56,784 | 47.91 | 3,594 |
| Krishna | 83 | Gannavaram | Musunnuru Ratnabose | INC(I) | 43,225 | 50.01 | Mulpuru Bala Krishna Rao | TDP | 42,510 | 49.19 | 715 |
| Krishna | 84 | Vuyyur | Vangaveeti Sobhana Chalapathi Rao | INC(I) | 45,415 | 51.79 | Anne Babu Rao | TDP | 40,771 | 46.50 | 4,644 |
| Krishna | 85 | Gudivada | Katari Eswara Rao | INC(I) | 52,723 | 49.79 | Raavi Sobhanadri Chowdary | TDP | 52,213 | 49.31 | 510 |
| Krishna | 86 | Mudinepalli | Pinnamaneni Venkateswara Rao | INC(I) | 47,265 | 50.59 | Vallabhaneni Babu Rao | TDP | 44,935 | 48.09 | 2,330 |
| Krishna | 87 | Kaikalur | Kanumuri Bapi Raju | INC(I) | 54,653 | 54.86 | Yerneni Rajaram Chander | TDP | 44,118 | 44.28 | 10,535 |
| Krishna | 88 | Malleswaram | Bnagadda Vedavyas | INC(I) | 48,837 | 52.70 | Kagita Venkata Rao | TDP | 43,839 | 47.30 | 4,998 |
| Krishna | 89 | Bandar | Perni Krishna Murthy | INC(I) | 51,952 | 53.68 | Nadakuditi Narsimha Rao | TDP | 44,049 | 45.52 | 7,903 |
| Krishna | 90 | Nidumolu (SC) | Patunu Ramaiah | CPI(M) | 36,149 | 42.91 | Munipalli Vinaya Babu | IND | 42.91 | 40.38 | 2,129 |
| Krishna | 91 | Avanigadda | Simhadri Satyanarayana Rao | TDP | 40,549 | 48.69 | Mandali Venkata Krishna Rao | INC(I) | 40,382 | 48.49 | 167 |
| Guntur | 92 | Kuchinapudi | Seetharamamma Evuru | TDP | 39,907 | 49.49 | Mopidevi Venkata Ramana Rao | INC(I) | 39,851 | 49.42 | 56 |
| Guntur | 93 | Repalle | Ambati Rambabu | INC(I) | 42,698 | 51.90 | Mummaneni Venkata Subbaiah | TDP | 39,360 | 47.84 | 3,338 |
| Guntur | 94 | Vemuru | Alapati Dharma Rao | INC(I) | 50,779 | 54.90 | Yadlapati Venkat Rao | TDP | 40,952 | 44.28 | 9,827 |
| Guntur | 95 | Duggirala | Gudibandi Venkata Reddy | INC(I) | 51,944 | 55.59 | Marreddy Balkoteswara Reddy | TDP | 40,564 | 43.41 | 11,380 |
| Guntur | 96 | Tenali | Nadendla Bhaskara Rao | INC(I) | 57,828 | 59.10 | Annabathuni Satya Narayana | TDP | 39,255 | 40.12 | 18,573 |
| Guntur | 97 | Ponnur | Chittineni Venkata Rao | INC(I) | 46,831 | 48.37 | Dhulipalla Veeraiah Chowdary | TDP | 45,177 | 46.66 | 1,654 |
| Guntur | 98 | Bapatla | Chirala Govardhana Reddy | INC(I) | 58,505 | 57.01 | Penumatsa Atchutarama Raju | TDP | 42,922 | 41.83 | 15,583 |
| Guntur | 99 | Prathipadu (Guntur) | Makineni Peda Rathaiah | TDP | 47,972 | 51.13 | G.V.Appa Rao | INC(I) | 45,192 | 48.17 | 2,780 |
| Guntur | 100 | Guntur-I | Mohammad Jani | INC(I) | 62,388 | 58.32 | Shaik Syed Saheb | TDP | 43,177 | 40.36 | 19,211 |
| Guntur | 101 | Guntur-II | Chadalawada Jayarambabu | INC(I) | 58,590 | 60.01 | Kilari Koteswara Rao | TDP | 37,616 | 38.53 | 20,974 |
| Guntur | 102 | Mangalagiri | Goli Veeranjaneyulu | INC(I) | 51,858 | 53.84 | Simhadri Siva Reddy | CPI(M) | 42,294 | 43.91 | 9,564 |
| Guntur | 103 | Tadikonda (SC) | Tiruvaipati Venkaiah | INC(I) | 49,779 | 50.42 | J. R. Pushpa Raju | TDP | 47,561 | 48.47 | 2,218 |
| Guntur | 104 | Sattenapalli | Dodda Balakoti Reddy | INC(I) | 63,287 | 55.53 | Puthumbaka Venkatapathi | CPI(M) | 49,359 | 43.15 | 2,218 |
| Guntur | 105 | Peddakurapadu | Kanna Lakshmi Narayana | INC(I) | 67,149 | 54.34 | Kasaraneni Samabasiva Rao | TDP | 55,167 | 44.64 | 11,982 |
| Guntur | 106 | Gurzala | Kayithi Venkata Narsireddy | INC(I) | 68,939 | 58.54 | Rachamadugu Sambhasiva Rao | TDP | 45,794 | 38.89 | 23,145 |
| Guntur | 107 | Macherla | Nimmagadda Sivarama Krishna Prasad | TDP | 47,538 | 51.89 | Nattuva Krishna Murthy | INC(I) | 42,761 | 46.68 | 4,777 |
| Guntur | 108 | Vinukonda | Nannapaneni Rajakumari | INC(I) | 47,431 | 44.00 | Veerapaneni Yellamanda Rao | IND | 46,301 | 42.95 | 1,130 |
| Guntur | 109 | Narasaraopet | Kodela Siva Prasada Rao | TDP | 66,982 | 53.26 | Mundlamuri Radhakrishna Murthy | INC(I) | 57,827 | 45.98 | 9,155 |
| Guntur | 110 | Chilakaluripet | Kandimalla Jayamma | TDP | 55,857 | 49.84 | Somepalli Sambaiah | INC(I) | 54,908 | 48.99 | 949 |
| Prakasam | 111 | Chirala | Konijeti Rosaiah | INC(I) | 64,235 | 60.08 | Chimata Sambu | TDP | 40,902 | 38.26 | 23,333 |
| Prakasam | 112 | Parchur | Daggubati Venkateswara Rao | TDP | 49,060 | 53.25 | Gade Venkata Reddy | IND | 42,232 | 45.84 | 6,828 |
| Prakasam | 113 | Martur | Karanam Balaram Krishna Murthy | TDP | 60,226 | 54.13 | Gottipati Hanumantha Rao | INC(I) | 50,101 | 45.03 | 10,125 |
| Prakasam | 114 | Addanki | Jagarlamudi Raghava Rao | INC(I) | 54,521 | 52.99 | Chenchu Garataiah Bachina | TDP | 47,439 | 46.11 | 7,082 |
| Prakasam | 115 | Ongole | Bachala Balaiah | INC(I) | 68,704 | 57.93 | Kamepalli Venkata Ramana Rao | TDP | 49,214 | 41.49 | 19,490 |
| Prakasam | 116 | Santhanuthalapadu (SC) | Gurrala Venkata Seshu | INC(I) | 58,404 | 54.40 | Tavanam Chenchaiah | CPI(M) | 46,514 | 43.33 | 11,890 |
| Prakasam | 117 | Kandukur | Manugunta Maheedhar Reddy | INC(I) | 56,626 | 54.81 | Moruboyina Malakondaiah | TDP | 46,428 | 44.94 | 10,198 |
| Prakasam | 118 | Kanigiri | Erigineni Thirupathi Naidu | INC(I) | 59,789 | 60.10 | Mukku Kasi Reddy | TDP | 39,688 | 39.90 | 20,101 |
| Prakasam | 119 | Kondepi | Achyuth Kumar Gundapaneni | INC(I) | 47,350 | 51.50 | Divi Sankaraiah | CPI | 43,023 | 46.80 | 4,327 |
| Prakasam | 120 | Cumbum | Kandula Nagarjuna Reddy | INC(I) | 58,356 | 63.16 | Vudumula Venkata Reddy | TDP | 32,523 | 35.20 | 25,833 |
| Prakasam | 121 | Darsi | Sanikommu Pitchireddy | INC(I) | 56,165 | 49.51 | Veginati Kotaiah | TDP | 54,879 | 48.38 | 1,286 |
| Prakasam | 122 | Markapur | Kunduru Pedda Konda Reddy | INC(I) | 52,147 | 51.24 | Janke Venkata Reddy | TDP | 49,616 | 48.76 | 2,531 |
| Prakasam | 123 | Giddalur | Yalluri Venkat Reddy | INC(I) | 45,694 | 58.26 | Pidathala Vijayakumar Reddy | TDP | 31,774 | 40.51 | 13,920 |
| Nellore | 124 | Udayagiri | Madala Janaki Ram | INC(I) | 46,556 | 51.87 | Kambham Vijayarami Reddy | TDP | 42,794 | 47.68 | 3,762 |
| Nellore | 125 | Kavali | Kaliki Yanadi Reddy | INC(I) | 54,115 | 54.28 | Patallapalli Vengal Rao | TDP | 44,252 | 44.39 | 9,863 |
| Nellore | 126 | Allur | Katamreddy Vishnuvardhan Reddy | INC(I) | 53,629 | 60.13 | Jakka Venkaiah | CPI(M) | 34,802 | 39.02 | 18,827 |
| Nellore | 127 | Kovur | Srinivasulu Reddy Nallapareddy | INC(I) | 49,589 | 52.81 | Bezawada Papi Reddy | TDP | 43,202 | 46.01 | 6,387 |
| Nellore | 128 | Atmakur (Nellore) | Bommireddy Sundarramireddy | INC(I) | 48,965 | 48.06 | Karnati Anjaneeya Reddy | BJP | 48,631 | 47.74 | 334 |
| Nellore | 129 | Rapur | Nuvvula Venkataratnam Naidu | INC(I) | 57,985 | 52.09 | Anam Ramanarayana Reddy | TDP | 53,331 | 47.91 | 4,654 |
| Nellore | 130 | Nellore | Jakka Kodandarami Reddy | IND | 56,566 | 50.28 | Thallapaka Rameshreddy | TDP | 42,092 | 37.42 | 14,474 |
| Nellore | 131 | Sarvepalli | Chiittoor Venkata Sesha Reddy | INC(I) | 54,796 | 54.63 | Poondla Dasaratharami Reddy | TDP | 41,648 | 41.52 | 13,148 |
| Nellore | 132 | Gudur (SC) | Patra Prakasa Rao | INC(I) | 61,246 | 56.68 | Balli Durga Prasad Rao | TDP | 45,850 | 42.43 | 15,396 |
| Nellore | 133 | Sulurpet (SC) | Pasala Penchalaiah | INC(I) | 49,013 | 50.52 | Satti Prakasham | TDP | 47,511 | 45.98 | 1,502 |
| Nellore | 134 | Venkatagiri | N. Janardhana Reddy | INC(I) | 62,270 | 58.18 | Nallapareddy Chandrasekhara Reddy | TDP | 43,129 | 40.29 | 19,141 |
| Chittoor | 135 | Srikalahasti | Bojjala Gopala Krishna Reddy | TDP | 58,800 | 53.06 | Tatiparthi Chenchu Reddy | INC(I) | 51,432 | 46.42 | 7,368 |
| Chittoor | 136 | Satyavedu (SC) | C. Doss | INC(I) | 57,801 | 57.16 | Talari Manohar | TDP | 42,133 | 41.16 | 15,668 |
| Chittoor | 137 | Nagari | Reddivari Chengareddy | INC(I) | 66,423 | 56.83 | Chilakam Ramakrishnama reddy | BJP | 50,248 | 42.99 | 16,175 |
| Chittoor | 138 | Puttur | Gali Muddukrishnama Naidu | TDP | 58,091 | 57.21 | Bodireddy Ramakrishna Reddy | INC(I) | 42,599 | 41.95 | 15,492 |
| Chittoor | 139 | Vepanjeri (SC) | Gummadi Kuthuhalamma | INC(I) | 60,710 | 58.14 | Talari Rudraiah | TDP | 42,920 | 41.10 | 17,790 |
| Chittoor | 140 | Chittoor | C.K. Jayachandra Reddy | IND | 44,972 | 45.08 | C. Hari Prasad | TDP | 26,986 | 27.05 | 17,986 |
| Chittoor | 141 | Palmaner (SC) | Patnam Subbaiah | TDP | 54,909 | 52.63 | P.R. Munaswamy | INC(I) | 49,161 | 47.12 | 5,748 |
| Chittoor | 142 | Kuppam | N. Chandrababu Naidu | TDP | 50,098 | 52.65 | B. R. Doraswami Naidu | INC(I) | 43,180 | 45.38 | 6,918 |
| Chittoor | 143 | Punganur | Nuthanakalva Ramakrishna Reddy | TDP | 56,779 | 54.05 | Reddivari Venugopal Reddy | INC(I) | 46,182 | 43.96 | 10,597 |
| Chittoor | 144 | Madanpalle | Kadapa Sudhakara Reddy | INC(I) | 45,331 | 48.15 | Ratahanda Narayana Reddy | TDP | 42,996 | 45.67 | 2,335 |
| Chittoor | 145 | Thamballapalle | Kalicherla Prabakar Reddy | IND | 35,950 | 42.38 | Anipireddi Venkata Lakshmi Devamma | IND | 27,255 | 32.13 | 8,695 |
| Chittoor | 146 | Vayalpad | Nallari Kiran Kumar Reddy | INC(I) | 50,636 | 52.09 | Chintala Ramachandra Reddy | TDP | 45,366 | 46.67 | 5,270 |
| Chittoor | 147 | Pileru | Peddireddy Ramachandra Reddy | INC(I) | 61,191 | 62.60 | Challa Ramchandra Reddy | TDP | 36,555 | 37.40 | 24,636 |
| Chittoor | 148 | Chandragiri | Galla Aruna Kumari | INC(I) | 54,270 | 49.85 | N.R.Jayadeva Naidu | TDP | 54,005 | 49.60 | 265 |
| Chittoor | 149 | Tirupathi | Mabbu Rami Reddy | INC(I) | 66,383 | 57.87 | Kola Ramu | TDP | 47,040 | 41.01 | 19,343 |
| Kadapa | 150 | Kodur (SC) | Thoomati Penchalaiah | TDP | 50,329 | 50.07 | Kotapati Dhananjaya | INC(I) | 49,173 | 49.01 | 1,066 |
| Kadapa | 151 | Rajampet | kasireddy Madan Mohan Reddy | INC(I) | 50,969 | 55.21 | Konduru Prabhavatamma | TDP | 40,459 | 43.82 | 10,510 |
| Kadapa | 152 | Rayachoti | Mandipalli Nagi Reddy | INC(I) | 50,475 | 53.74 | Sugavasi Palakondarayudu | TDP | 40,732 | 43.37 | 9,743 |
| Kadapa | 153 | Lakkireddipalli | Rajagopal Reddy | INC(I) | 45,038 | 49.66 | G. Mohan reddy | TDP | 44,409 | 48.97 | 629 |
| Kadapa | 154 | Cuddapa | K. Sivananda Reddy | INC(I) | 80,493 | 62.45 | Mundla Venkata Siva Reddy | TDP | 44,604 | 34.61 | 35,889 |
| Kadapa | 155 | Badvel | Vaddamani Sivarama Krishna Rao | INC(I) | 60,804 | 53.83 | B. Veera Reddy | TDP | 50,803 | 44.97 | 10,001 |
| Kadapa | 156 | Mydukur | D. L. Ravindra Reddy | INC(I) | 68,577 | 65.61 | Settipalli Raghurami Reddy | TDP | 35,219 | 33.59 | 33,358 |
| Kadapa | 157 | Proddatur | Nandyala Varada Rajulu Reddy | INC(I) | 77,386 | 61.75 | Gandluru Krishna Reddy | TDP | 46,089 | 36.78 | 31,297 |
| Kadapa | 158 | Jammalamadugu | Ponnapureddy Siva Reddy | TDP | 75,248 | 67.33 | Michael Vijaya Kumar Moorathoti | INC(I) | 35,928 | 32.15 | 39,320 |
| Kadapa | 159 | Kamalapuram | Mule Venkata Mysura Reddy | INC(I) | 74,921 | 67.23 | Vaddamani Venkata Reddy | TDP | 36,194 | 32.68 | 38,727 |
| Kadapa | 160 | Pulivendla | Y.S. Vivekananda Reddy | INC(I) | 77,183 | 71.73 | Jyoti Devi Reddy | TDP | 29,437 | 27.36 | 47,746 |
| Anantapur | 161 | Kadiri | Mohammed Shakir | INC(I) | 43,105 | 51.50 | Desai Rami Reddy | IND | 24,830 | 29.67 | 18,275 |
| Anantapur | 162 | Nallamada | Agisam Veerappa | INC(I) | 41,847 | 51.00 | Saddapalle Venkat Reddy | TDP | 39,304 | 47.90 | 2,543 |
| Anantapur | 163 | Gorantla | Pamudurthi Ravindra Reddy | INC(I) | 49,457 | 52.02 | Veluri Kesanna | TDP | 44,935 | 47.27 | 4,522 |
| Anantapur | 164 | Hindupur | N.T.Rama Rao | TDP | 63,715 | 61.60 | G. Soma Sekhar | INC(I) | 39,720 | 38.40 | 23,995 |
| Anantapur | 165 | Madakasira | Raghu Veera Reddy | INC(I) | 54,929 | 54.90 | H. B. Narase Gowdu | TDP | 43,993 | 43.97 | 10,936 |
| Anantapur | 166 | Penukonda | Sane Chenna Reddy | INC(I) | 46,065 | 54.43 | S. Ramachandra Reddy | IND | 35,518 | 41.97 | 10,547 |
| Anantapur | 167 | Kalyandrug (SC) | M.Lakshmi Devi | INC(I) | 48,448 | 52.15 | V.Sanjeevaiah | CPI | 43,706 | 47.04 | 4,742 |
| Anantapur | 168 | Rayadrug | P. Venngopal Reddy | INC(I) | 47,550 | 52.62 | Kata Govindappa | TDP | 41,000 | 45.37 | 6,550 |
| Anantapur | 169 | Uravakonda | V.Gopinath | INC(I) | 52,365 | 58.98 | Gurram Narayanappa | TDP | 35,723 | 40.24 | 16,642 |
| Anantapur | 170 | Gooty | Arikeri Jagadeesh | INC(I) | 41,784 | 50.54 | Sainath Goud | TDP | 40,171 | 48.59 | 1,613 |
| Anantapur | 171 | Singanamala (SC) | P.Samanthakamani | INC(I) | 42,777 | 52.77 | B.C.Govindappa | TDP | 35,698 | 44.04 | 7,079 |
| Anantapur | 172 | Anantapur | Bodimalla Narayana Reddy | INC(I) | 63,601 | 60.11 | Kammuri Saifulla | TDP | 41,288 | 39.02 | 22,313 |
| Anantapur | 173 | Dhamavaram | G. Nagi Reddy | TDP | 70,138 | 69.65 | Girraju Narayanaswamy | INC(I) | 29,717 | 29.51 | 40,421 |
| Anantapur | 174 | Tadpatri | J. C. Diwakar Reddy | INC(I) | 53,554 | 49.85 | Peram Nagi Reddy | TDP | 52,335 | 48.71 | 1,219 |
| Kurnool | 175 | Alur (SC) | Gudlannagari Loknath | INC(I) | 36,945 | 55.20 | Ranigah | TDP | 28,395 | 42.43 | 8,550 |
| Kurnool | 176 | Adoni | Rayachoti Ramaiah | INC(I) | 48,925 | 53.82 | Konka Meenakshi Naidu | TDP | 39,856 | 43.84 | 9,069 |
| Kurnool | 177 | Yemmiganur | B. V. Mohan Reddy | TDP | 53,046 | 51.38 | M.S. Sivanna | INC(I) | 48,582 | 47.06 | 4,464 |
| Kurnool | 178 | Kodumur (SC) | M. Madana Gopal | IND | 42,644 | 48.83 | M. Sikhamani | TDP | 41,333 | 47.33 | 1,311 |
| Kurnool | 179 | Kurnool | V. Rambhupal Chowdary | INC(I) | 57,341 | 55.58 | M.A.Gafoor | CPI(M) | 43,554 | 42.30 | 13,787 |
| Kurnool | 180 | Pattikonda | Patil Seshi Reddy | INC(I) | 37,198 | 43.48 | T.Huchappa | TDP | 31,652 | 37.00 | 5,546 |
| Kurnool | 181 | Dhone | K. E. Krishna Murthy | INC(I) | 50,099 | 56.29 | Kotla Rama Krishna Reddy | TDP | 37,874 | 42.84 | 12,225 |
| Kurnool | 182 | Koilkuntla | Karra Subba Reddy | TDP | 49,474 | 53.37 | S. V. Subba Reddy | INC(I) | 42,285 | 45.67 | 7,189 |
| Kurnool | 183 | Allagadda | Bhuma Sekhar Reddy | TDP | 54,501 | 50.75 | Gangula Prathapa Reddy | INC(I) | 51,549 | 48.00 | 2,952 |
| Kurnool | 184 | Panyam | Katasani Rambhupal Reddy | INC(I) | 55,692 | 56.67 | Bijjem Satyanarayana Reddy | TDP | 40,675 | 41.39 | 15,017 |
| Kurnool | 185 | Nandikotkur | Byreddy Seshasayana Reddy | INC(I) | 53,745 | 52.00 | Ippala Thimmareddy | TDP | 49,617 | 48.00 | 4,128 |
| Kurnool | 186 | Nandyal | V.Ramanath Reddy | INC(I) | 57,229 | 52.85 | N. Md. Farooq | TDP | 50,017 | 46.19 | 7,212 |
| Kurnool | 187 | Atmakur (Kurnool) | Budda Vengala Reddy | INC(I) | 41,897 | 57.36 | Siva Rami Reddy | TDP | 26,125 | 35.76 | 25,021 |
| Mahabubnagar | 188 | Achampet (SC) | D. Kiran Kumar | INC(I) | 45,030 | 49.94 | Puttapaga Mahendranath | TDP | 42,421 | 47.05 | 2,609 |
| Mahabubnagar | 189 | Nagarkurnool | V. N. Goud | INC(I) | 44,046 | 46.53 | Dyapa Gopal Reddy | TDP | 25,233 | 26.66 | 18,813 |
| Mahabubnagar | 190 | Kalwakurthy | J.Chittaranjan Das | INC(I) | 54,354 | 50.94 | N.T.Rama Rao | TDP | 50,786 | 47.59 | 3,568 |
| Mahabubnagar | 191 | Shadnagar (SC) | P. Shankar Rao | INC(I) | 48,314 | 53.20 | Indira | TDP | 39,614 | 43.62 | 8,700 |
| Mahabubnagar | 192 | Jadcherla | Sudhakar Reddy | INC(I) | 42,285 | 48.66 | M.Krishna Reddy | TDP | 41,234 | 47.45 | 1,051 |
| Mahabubnagar | 193 | Mahbubnagar | Puli Veeranna | INC(I) | 48,780 | 51.95 | P. Chandra Shekar | TDP | 42,739 | 45.52 | 6,041 |
| Mahabubnagar | 194 | Wanaparthy | G. Chinna Reddy | INC(I) | 62,712 | 62.56 | Balakrishnaiah | TDP | 34,837 | 34.76 | 27,875 |
| Mahabubnagar | 195 | Kollapur | Kotha Venkateswar Rao | INC(I) | 47,950 | 50.33 | Suravaram Sudhakar Reddy | CPI | 38,791 | 40.72 | 9,159 |
| Mahabubnagar | 196 | Alampur | Ravula Ravindranath Reddy | BJP | 48,167 | 54.95 | Rajini Babu | INC(I) | 37,795 | 43.12 | 10,372 |
| Mahabubnagar | 197 | Gadwal | D. K. Samarasimha Reddy | INC(I) | 52,224 | 53.26 | Venktrami Reddy | TDP | 41,770 | 42.60 | 10,524 |
| Mahabubnagar | 198 | Amarchinta | Veera Reddy | INC(I) | 51,725 | 52.11 | Dayakar Reddy | TDP | 44,974 | 45.32 | 6,751 |
| Mahabubnagar | 199 | Makthal | Chittem Narsi Reddy | JD | 44,256 | 53.98 | G. Narasimhulu Naidu | IND | 35,704 | 43.55 | 8,552 |
| Mahabubnagar | 200 | Kodangal | Gurunath Reddy | INC(I) | 52,314 | 56.37 | Lahoti Ratanlal | TDP | 31,729 | 34.19 | 20,585 |
| Ranga Reddy | 201 | Tandur | M. Chandra Sekhar | INC(I) | 48,085 | 50.16 | Pasaram Shanth Kumar | TDP | 37,422 | 39.04 | 10,663 |
| Ranga Reddy | 202 | Vikarabad (SC) | A. Chandrasekhar | TDP | 41,564 | 47.44 | V.B.Thirumaliah | INC(I) | 37,595 | 42.91 | 3,969 |
| Ranga Reddy | 203 | Pargi | Kamatam Ram Reddy | INC(I) | 52,368 | 51.56 | Koppula Harishwar Reddy | TDP | 48,179 | 47.43 | 4,189 |
| Ranga Reddy | 204 | Chevella | P. Indra Reddy | TDP | 56,683 | 51.23 | Kondakalla Kantha Reddy | INC(I) | 47,289 | 42.75 | 9,394 |
| Ranga Reddy | 205 | Ibrahimpatnam (SC) | Kondigari Ramulu | CPI(M) | 49,477 | 50.83 | A. G. Krishna | INC(I) | 45,309 | 46.14 | 4,168 |
| Hyderabad | 206 | Musheerabad | M. Kodanda Reddy | INC(I) | 41,733 | 48.47 | Nayani Narasimha Reddy | JD | 29,366 | 34.11 | 12,367 |
| Hyderabad | 207 | Himayatnagar | V. Hanumantha Rao | INC(I) | 46,213 | 54.37 | Ale Narendra | BJP | 35,705 | 42.01 | 10,508 |
| Hyderabad | 208 | Sanathnagar | Marri Chenna Reddy | INC(I) | 47,988 | 57.91 | S. Rajeswar | TDP | 31,089 | 37.51 | 16,899 |
| Hyderabad | 209 | Secunderabad | Mary Ravindra Nath | INC(I) | 45,700 | 52.71 | Alladi Rajkumar | TDP | 34,139 | 39.38 | 11,561 |
| Hyderabad | 210 | Khairatabad | P. Janardhana Reddy | INC(I) | 87,578 | 54.46 | M. Narayana Swamy | TDP | 48,891 | 30.41 | 38,687 |
| Hyderabad | 211 | Secunderabad Cantt. (SC) | D. Narsinga Rao | INC(I) | 55,703 | 58.01 | N. A. Krishna | TDP | 32,904 | 34.26 | 22,799 |
| Hyderabad | 212 | Malakpet | P.Sudhir Kumar | INC(I) | 63,221 | 43.44 | N. Indrasena Reddy | BJP | 52,233 | 35.89 | 10,988 |
| Hyderabad | 213 | Asifnagar | Syed Sajjad | AIMIM | 40,482 | 48.02 | Danam Nagender | INC(I) | 31,747 | 37.66 | 8,735 |
| Hyderabad | 214 | Maharajgunj | Mukesh Goud | INC(I) | 28,890 | 51.53 | Bandaru Dattarreya | BJP | 26,294 | 46.80 | 2,596 |
| Hyderabad | 215 | Karwan | Baddam Bal Reddy | BJP | 72,558 | 45.25 | Baqer Agha | AIMIM | 69,522 | 43.36 | 3,036 |
| Hyderabad | 216 | Yakutpura | Ibrahim Bin Abdullah Masqati | AIMIM | 82,924 | 72.95 | Ali Raza | INC(I) | 18,267 | 16.07 | 64,657 |
| Hyderabad | 217 | Chandrayangutta | Md. Amanullah Khan | AIMIM | 1,16,587 | 68.15 | P. Brahmananda Chary | TDP | 38,440 | 22.47 | 78,147 |
| Hyderabad | 218 | Charminar | Virasat Rasoot Khan | AIMIM | 1,08,365 | 75.37 | C. Ashok Kumar | INC(I) | 22,884 | 15.92 | 85,481 |
| Ranga Reddy | 219 | Medchal | Uma Venkatarama Reddy | INC(I) | 93,855 | 54.57 | Kommareddy Surender Reddy | TDP | 73,032 | 42.46 | 20,823 |
| Medak | 220 | Siddipet | K. Chandra Shakher Rao | TDP | 53,145 | 55.57 | Ananthula Madan Mohan | INC(I) | 39,329 | 41.12 | 13,816 |
| Medak | 221 | Dommat | Cheruku Mutyam Reddy | TDP | 33,056 | 43.68 | M.Ranga Reddy | INC(I) | 23,783 | 31.42 | 9,273 |
| Medak | 222 | Gajwel (SC) | J. Geeta Reddy | INC(I) | 48,974 | 50.15 | B. Sanjeeva Rao | TDP | 45,616 | 46.71 | 3,358 |
| Medak | 223 | Narsapur | Chilumula Vittal Reddy | CPI | 39,428 | 41.22 | C. Jagannath Rao | INC(I) | 32,787 | 34.28 | 6,641 |
| Medak | 224 | Sangareddy | P. Ramachandra Reddy | INC(I) | 69,918 | 52.60 | R. Srinivas Goud | TDP | 49,019 | 36.87 | 20,899 |
| Medak | 225 | Zahirabad | Patlolla Narsimha Reddy | INC(I) | 50,047 | 52.47 | Ramlingam Dasarath Reddy | TDP | 40,550 | 42.52 | 9,497 |
| Medak | 226 | Narayankhed | Shivrao Shettkar | INC(I) | 55,506 | 51.33 | M. Venkata Reddy | TDP | 50,168 | 46.40 | 5,338 |
| Medak | 227 | Medak | Patlolla Narayana Reddy | INC(I) | 51,990 | 55.29 | Karanam Ramachandra Rao | TDP | 42,037 | 44.71 | 9,953 |
| Medak | 228 | Ramayampet | Anthireddigari Vittal Reddy | INC(I) | 56,742 | 61.12 | Ramannagari Srinivasa Reddy | BJP | 28,502 | 30.70 | 28,240 |
| Medak | 229 | Andole (SC) | Damodar Raja Narasimha | INC(I) | 45,183 | 50.42 | Malyala Rajaiah | TDP | 42,169 | 47.05 | 3,014 |
| Nizamabad | 230 | Balkonda | K. R. Suresh Reddy | INC(I) | 43,837 | 51.46 | Mothe Ganga Reddy | TDP | 37,871 | 44.45 | 5,966 |
| Nizamabad | 231 | Armur | Sanigaram Santosh Reddy | INC(I) | 51,881 | 53.88 | Vemula Surender Reddy | TDP | 40,460 | 42.02 | 11,421 |
| Nizamabad | 232 | Kamareddy | Mohammed Ali Shabbir | INC(I) | 38,029 | 39.97 | Syed Yousf Ali | TDP | 25,051 | 26.33 | 12,978 |
| Nizamabad | 233 | Yellareddy | Neralla Anjaneeyulu | TDP | 31,034 | 34.29 | Kishan Reddy | IND | 29,318 | 32.40 | 1,716 |
| Nizamabad | 234 | Jukkal (SC) | S. Gangaram | INC(I) | 40,646 | 49.58 | Kale Srinivas | TDP | 39,372 | 49.58 | 1,274 |
| Nizamabad | 235 | Banswada | Kathera Gangadhar | TDP | 44,377 | 44.99 | Reddygari Venkatarama Reddy | INC(I) | 41,934 | 42.51 | 2,443 |
| Nizamabad | 236 | Bodhan | Kotha ramakanth | TDP | 36,702 | 38.23 | P. Sudarshan Reddy | INC(I) | 33,107 | 34.48 | 3,595 |
| Nizamabad | 237 | Nizamabad | Dharmapuri Srinivas | INC(I) | 45,558 | 44.91 | D. Satyanarayana | TDP | 31,549 | 31.10 | 14,009 |
| Nizamabad | 238 | Dichpalli | Mandava Venkateshwara Rao | TDP | 42,896 | 48.81 | N. L. Narayana | INC(I) | 42,671 | 48.55 | 225 |
| Adilabad | 239 | Mudhole | G. Gaddenna | INC(I) | 43,360 | 46.84 | Vittal | TDP | 41,074 | 44.37 | 2,286 |
| Adilabad | 240 | Nirmal | Samudrala Venugopal Chary | TDP | 46,807 | 50.51 | Aindla Bheema Reddy | INC(I) | 41,818 | 45.13 | 4,989 |
| Adilabad | 241 | Boath (ST) | Godam Ramarao | TDP | 46,807 | 50.51 | Amar Singh Kilavath | INC(I) | 41,818 | 45.13 | 3,595 |
| Adilabad | 242 | Adilabad | Chilkuri Ramachander Reddy | INC(I) | 48,868 | 54.13 | Kunta Chandrakanth Reddy | TDP | 38,416 | 42.55 | 10,452 |
| Adilabad | 243 | Khanapur (ST) | Kotnak Bhim Rao | INC(I) | 34,125 | 48.38 | A. Govind Naik | TDP | 33,679 | 47.75 | 446 |
| Adilabad | 244 | Asifabad (SC) | Dasari Narsaiah | INC(I) | 40,736 | 51.72 | Gunda Mallesh | CPI | 34,804 | 44.19 | 5,932 |
| Adilabad | 245 | Luxettipet | G.V. Sudhakar Rao | INC(I) | 46,349 | 46.38 | Kalvakuntla Surender Rao | INC(I) | 41,435 | 41.46 | 4,914 |
| Adilabad | 246 | Sirpur | Palvai Purushotam Rao | IND | 25,860 | 34.39 | K. V. Narayana Rao | TDP | 23,419 | 31.14 | 2,441 |
| Adilabad | 247 | Chennur (SC) | Boda Janardhan | TDP | 30,733 | 48.97 | Pradeep | INC(I) | 20,749 | 33.06 | 9,984 |
| Karimnagar | 248 | Manthani | D. Sripada Rao | INC(I) | 50,658 | 53.05 | Bellamkonda Saku Bhai | TDP | 43,880 | 45.96 | 6,778 |
| Karimnagar | 249 | Peddapalle | Geetla Mukunda Reddy | INC(I) | 46,781 | 49.65 | Birudu Rajamallu | TDP | 44,825 | 47.58 | 1,956 |
| Karimnagar | 250 | Mydaram (SC) | Mathangi Narsaiah | INC(I) | 50,451 | 47.27 | Malem Mallesham | TDP | 47,341 | 44.35 | 3,110 |
| Karimnagar | 251 | Huzurabad | Kethiri Sai Reddy | IND | 32,953 | 35.25 | Duggirala Venkat Rao | TDP | 29,251 | 31.29 | 3,702 |
| Karimnagar | 252 | Kamalapur | Muddasani Damodar Reddy | TDP | 49,698 | 51.28 | Lingampalli Veera Reddy | INC(I) | 43,414 | 44.79 | 6,284 |
| Karimnagar | 253 | Indurthi | Desini Chinna Mallaiah | CPI | 41,274 | 48.56 | Bomma Venkateswar | INC(I) | 40,717 | 47.91 | 557 |
| Karimnagar | 254 | Karimnagar | V Jagapathi Rao | IND | 37,248 | 35.71 | K. Murtunjayam | TDP | 36,821 | 35.30 | 427 |
| Karimnagar | 255 | Choppadandi | Nyalakonda Ramkishan Rao | TDP | 47,783 | 52.57 | Koduri Satyanarayana | INC(I) | 39,921 | 43.92 | 7,862 |
| Karimnagar | 256 | Jagtial | T. Jeevan Reddy | INC(I) | 62,590 | 65.95 | Godisela Rajesham Goud | TDP | 30,804 | 32.59 | 31,786 |
| Karimnagar | 257 | Buggaram | Juvvadi Venkateshwar Rao | INC(I) | 32,892 | 37.96 | Gandra Venkateshwar Rao | TDP | 24,299 | 28.04 | 8,593 |
| Karimnagar | 258 | Metpalli | C. Vidyasagar Rao | BJP | 41,221 | 49.52 | Miryala Kishan Rao | INC(I) | 35,567 | 42.72 | 5,654 |
| Karimnagar | 259 | Sircilla | N. V. Krishnaiah | IND | 26,430 | 29.84 | Regulapati Papa Rao | IND | 25,906 | 29.25 | 524 |
| Karimnagar | 260 | Narella (SC) | Pati Rajam | INC(I) | 37,522 | 46.16 | Gotte Bhoopathi | JD | 18,804 | 23.13 | 18,718 |
| Warangal | 261 | Cheriyal | Nimma Raja Reddy | TDP | 40,758 | 51.43 | Nagapuri Rajalingam | INC(I) | 36,455 | 46.00 | 4,303 |
| Warangal | 262 | Jangaon | Ponnala Lakshmaiah | INC(I) | 45,690 | 50.57 | Charagonda Raji Reddy | CPI(M) | 39,025 | 43.19 | 6,665 |
| Warangal | 263 | Chennur | Nemarugommula Yethi Raja Rao | TDP | 56,453 | 53.22 | Kundur Madhusudhan Reddy | INC(I) | 47,273 | 44.57 | 9,180 |
| Warangal | 264 | Dornakal | Dharamsoth Redya Naik | INC(I) | 46,645 | 51.95 | Satyavathi Rathod | TDP | 41,560 | 46.29 | 5,085 |
| Warangal | 265 | Mahbubabad | Jannareddy Janardhan Reddy | INC(I) | 46,229 | 44.57 | Bandi Pullaiah | CPI | 43,016 | 41.84 | 3,213 |
| Warangal | 266 | Narsampet | Maddikayala Omkar | IND | 44,597 | 42.37 | Epuru Janardhan Reddy | INC(I) | 33,502 | 31.83 | 11,095 |
| Warangal | 267 | Waradhanapet | Takkallapalli Rajeshwar Rao | BJP | 39,118 | 43.71 | Errabelli Varadha Rajeswar Rao | INC(I) | 29,052 | 32.47 | 10,066 |
| Warangal | 268 | Ghanpur Station (SC) | B.Arogyam | INC(I) | 38,512 | 48.79 | Bojjapalli Rajaiah | TDP | 33,046 | 41.86 | 5,466 |
| Warangal | 269 | Warangal | Takkallapalli Purushotham Rao | INC(I) | 33,041 | 37.68 | Basavaraju Saraiah | IND | 24,662 | 28.12 | 8,379 |
| Warangal | 270 | Hanamkonda | P. V. Ranga Rao | INC(I) | 59,153 | 58.33 | Dasyam Pranay Bhaskar | TDP | 35,810 | 35.43 | 23,343 |
| Warangal | 271 | Shyampet | Madadi Narasimha Reddy | INC(I) | 35,673 | 41.47 | Manda Ailaiah | BJP | 31,095 | 36.15 | 4,578 |
| Warangal | 272 | Parkal (SC) | V. Jayapal | BJP | 38,533 | 48.18 | Bochu Sammaiah | INC(I) | 36,933 | 46.18 | 1,600 |
| Warangal | 273 | Mulug (ST) | Porika Jagan Naik | INC(I) | 44,345 | 45.08 | Azmeera Chandulal | TDP | 38,866 | 39.51 | 5,479 |
| Khammam | 274 | Bhadrachalam (ST) | Kunja Bojji | CPI(M) | 48,217 | 50.82 | Dungurothu Suseela | INC(I) | 40,441 | 42.63 | 7,776 |
| Khammam | 275 | Burgampahad (ST) | Kunja Biksham | CPI | 46,179 | 48.95 | Chanda Lingaiah | TDP | 41,347 | 43.83 | 4,832 |
| Khammam | 276 | Kothagudem | Koneru Nageswara Rao | INC(I) | 49,514 | 48.24 | Vanama Venkateshwara Rao | TDP | 49,267 | 48.00 | 247 |
| Khammam | 277 | Sathupalli | Jalagam Prasada Rao | INC(I) | 61,389 | 48.69 | Thummala Nageswara Rao | TDP | 54,960 | 43.59 | 6,429 |
| Khammam | 278 | Madhira | Bodepudi Venkateswara Rao | CPI(M) | 62,853 | 52.28 | Seelam Sidda Reddy | INC(I) | 55,831 | 46.44 | 7,022 |
| Khammam | 279 | Palair (SC) | Sambhani Chandra Sekhar | INC(I) | 55,845 | 48.60 | Baji Hanumanthu | CPI(M) | 51,530 | 44.85 | 4,315 |
| Khammam | 280 | Khammam | Puvvada Nageswar Rao | CPI | 61,590 | 51.07 | Kavuturi Durga Narasiamha Rao | INC(I) | 53,495 | 44.36 | 8,095 |
| Khammam | 281 | Shujatnagar | Mohammad Rajab Ali | CPI | 50,266 | 51.51 | Md. Ismail | INC(I) | 44,323 | 45.42 | 5,943 |
| Khammam | 282 | Yellandu (ST) | Gummadi Narsaiah | IND | 38,388 | 39.06 | Vooke Abbaiah | CPI | 30,705 | 31.24 | 7,683 |
| Nalgonda | 283 | Thungathurthi | Ramreddy Damodar Reddy | INC(I) | 36,125 | 36.10 | Mallu Swarajyam | CPI(M) | 31,072 | 31.74 | 5,053 |
| Nalgonda | 284 | Suryapet (SC) | Eda Deviah | TDP | 52,441 | 50.37 | Eda Deviah | INC(I) | 48,030 | 46.13 | 4,411 |
| Nalgonda | 285 | Kodad | Venepalli Chandra Rao | TDP | 62,650 | 50.67 | Veerapalli Laxminarayana Rao | INC(I) | 58,850 | 47.60 | 3,800 |
| Nalgonda | 286 | Miryalguda | Vijayasiamha Reddy | INC(I) | 73,473 | 50.64 | Aribandi Lakshmi Narayana | CPI(M) | 34,036 | 46.68 | 5,453 |
| Nalgonda | 287 | Chalakurthi | Kunduru Jana Reddy | INC(I) | 63,231 | 55.98 | Gopagani Peda Narasaiah | TDP | 48,162 | 42.64 | 15,069 |
| Nalgonda | 288 | Nakrekal | Narra Raghava Reddy | CPI(M) | 58,179 | 56.06 | Gurram Vidyasagar Reddy | INC(I) | 43,551 | 41.97 | 14,628 |
| Nalgonda | 289 | Nalgonda | Malreddy Raghurami Reddy | TDP | 53,002 | 49.24 | Gutha Mohan Reddy | INC(I) | 49,604 | 46.08 | 3,398 |
| Nalgonda | 290 | Ramannapet | Gurram Yadagiri Reddy | CPI | 51,198 | 51.57 | Uppununthala purushotham reddy | INC(I) | 43,806 | 44.12 | 7,392 |
| Nalgonda | 291 | Alair (SC) | Motkupalli Narasimhulu | IND | 44,953 | 48.00 | Yadagi Basani Sunnam | TDP | 32,472 | 34.67 | 12,481 |
| Nalgonda | 292 | Bhongir | Alimineti Madhava Reddy | TDP | 66,228 | 59.39 | Gardasu Balaiah | INC(I) | 43,361 | 38.88 | 22,867 |
| Nalgonda | 293 | Mungode | Ujjini Narayana Rao | CPI | 51,445 | 53.01 | Palvai Govardhan Reddy | INC(I) | 43,183 | 44.50 | 8,262 |
| Nalgonda | 294 | Devarakonda (ST) | Moodu Badhu Chowhan | CPI | 49,414 | 51.16 | D. Bagya Naik | INC(I) | 44,214 | 45.77 | 5,200 |
