= Bheemunipatnam Assembly constituency =

Defunct assembly constituency of Andhra Pradesh

Coordinates: 17.89°N 83.45°E

Bheemunipatnam
- Former constituency for the Andhra Pradesh Legislative Assembly

Constituency details
- Country: India
- Region: South India
- State: Andhra Pradesh
- District: Visakhapatnam
- Lok Sabha constituency: Visakhapatnam
- Established: 1951
- Abolished: 2008
- Reservation: None

Bheemunipatnam Assembly constituency was a constituency in Visakhapatnam district of Andhra Pradesh that elected representatives to the Andhra Pradesh Legislative Assembly in India. It was one of six assembly segments in Visakhapatnam Lok Sabha constituency.

The constituency was established in 1951, as per the Delimitation Orders (1951) and abolished in 2008, as per the Delimitation Orders (2008).

== Members of the Legislative Assembly ==
Year	Member	Political party
1952	Kaligotla Suryanarayana	Independent politician
1955	Gottumukkala Jagannadha Raju	Praja Socialist Party
1960 by-election	Pusapati Vijayarama Gajapati Raju	Indian National Congress
1962	Pusapati Vijayarama Gajapati Raju	Indian National Congress
1967	Pusapati Vijayarama Gajapati Raju	Indian National Congress
1972	Raja Sagi Soma Sundara Suryanarayana Raju	Indian National Congress
1978	Datla Jagannadha Raju	Indian National Congress (I)
1983	Pusapati Ananda Gajapati Raju	Telugu Desam Party
1985	Raja Sagi Devi Prasanna Appala Narasimha Raju	Telugu Desam Party
1989	Raja Sagi Devi Prasanna Appala Narasimha Raju	Telugu Desam Party
1994	Raja Sagi Devi Prasanna Appala Narasimha Raju	Telugu Desam Party
1999	Raja Sagi Devi Prasanna Appala Narasimha Raju	Telugu Desam Party
2004	Karri Seetharamu	Indian National Congress

== Election results ==
=== 1952 ===
1952 Madras State Legislative Assembly election: Bheemunipatnam
Party	Candidate	Votes	%	±%
Independent	Kaligotla Suryanarayana	11,194	31.69%	
CPI	J. V. K. Vallabha Rao	10,200	28.88%	
Socialist Party (India)	Botcha Adinarayanna	8,156	23.09%	
INC	Poosapati Madhava Varma	5,769	16.33%	16.33%
Margin of victory		994	2.81%	
Turnout		35,319	53.00%	
Registered electors		66,642		
Independent win (new seat)				
