= Chilakaluripet Assembly constituency =

Constituency of the Andhra Pradesh Legislative Assembly, India

Coordinates: 16.09°N 80.16°E

Chilakaluripet
- Constituency No. 96 for the Andhra Pradesh Legislative Assembly
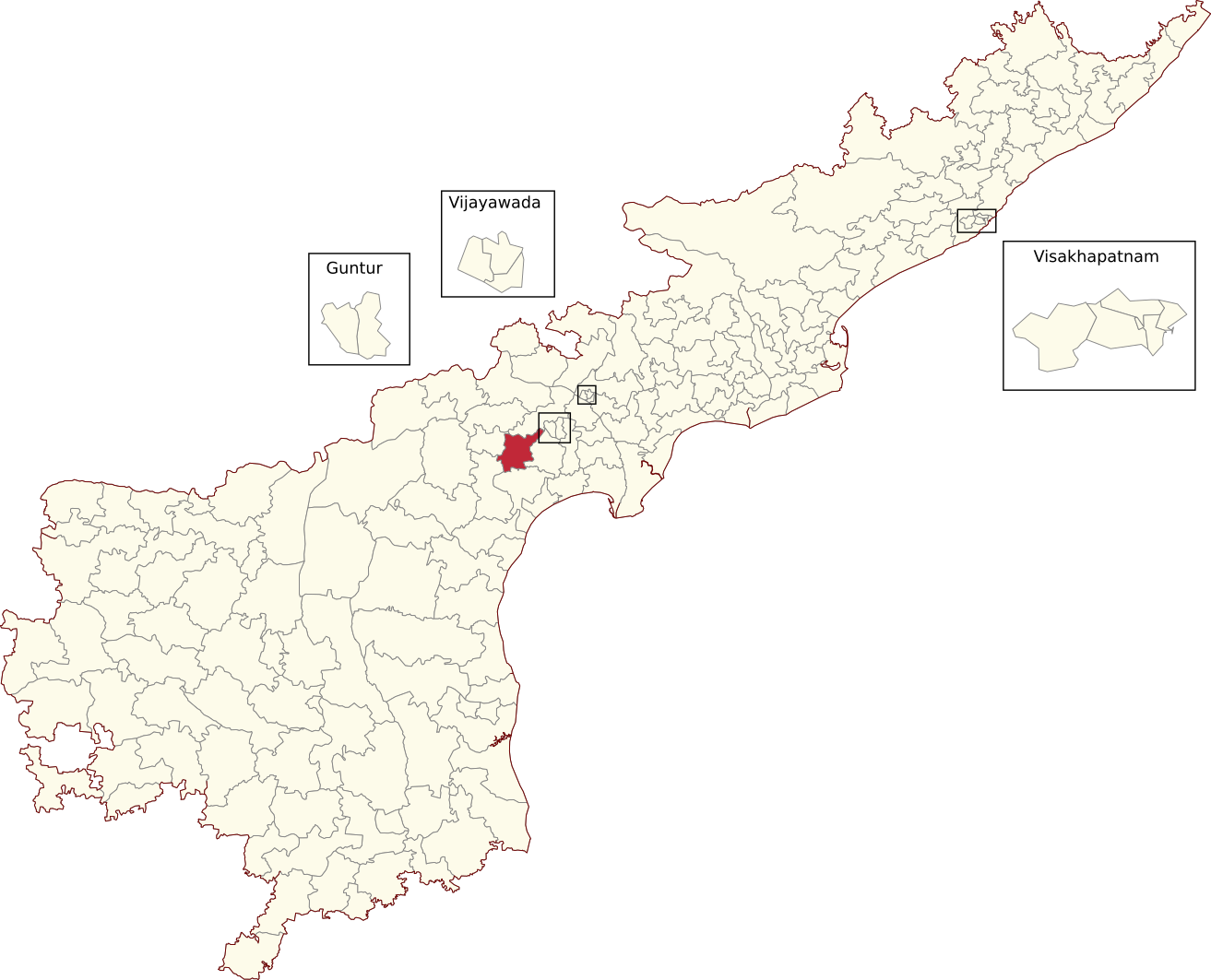
- Location of Chilakaluripet Assembly constituency within Andhra Pradesh

Constituency details
- Country: India
- Region: South India
- State: Andhra Pradesh
- District: Palnadu
- Lok Sabha constituency: Narasaraopet
- Established: 1951
- Total electors: 2,26,867
- Reservation: None

Member of Legislative Assembly
- 16th Andhra Pradesh Legislative Assembly
- Incumbent Prathipati Pulla Rao
- Party: TDP
- Alliance: NDA
- Elected year: 2024

Chilakaluripet Assembly constituency is a constituency in Palnadu district of Andhra Pradesh that elects representatives to the Andhra Pradesh Legislative Assembly in India. It is one of the seven assembly segments of Narasaraopet Lok Sabha constituency.

Prathipati Pulla Rao is the current MLA of the constituency, having won the 2024 Andhra Pradesh Legislative Assembly election from Telugu Desam Party. As of 2024, there are a total of 2,26,867 electors in the constituency. The constituency was established in 1951, as per the Delimitation Orders (1951).

== Mandals ==
Mandal
Nadendla
Chilakaluripet
Edlapudu

Mandals in Chilakaluripet Assembly Constituency

== Members of the Legislative Assembly ==
Year	Member	Political party
1952	Karnam Ranga Rao	Communist Party of India
1967	Kandimalla Butchaiah	Swatantra Party
1972	Bobbala Satyanarayana	Indian National Congress
1978	Somepalli Sambaiah	Indian National Congress (I)
1983	Kaza Krishna Murthy	Telugu Desam Party
1985	Somepalli Sambaiah	Indian National Congress
1989	Kandimalla Jayamma	Telugu Desam Party
1994	Somepalli Sambaiah	Indian National Congress
1999	Prathipati Pulla Rao	Telugu Desam Party
2004	Marri Rajasekhar	Independent politician
2009	Prathipati Pulla Rao	Telugu Desam Party
2014	Prathipati Pulla Rao	Telugu Desam Party
2019	Vidadala Rajini	YSR Congress Party
2024	Prathipati Pulla Rao	Telugu Desam Party

== Election results ==
=== 1952 ===
1952 Madras Legislative Assembly election: Chilakaluripet
Party	Candidate	Votes	%	±%
CPI	Karnam Ranga Rao	20,732	45.67%	
INC	Balineni Nagaiah	10,265	22.61%	22.61%
KLP	Kalahasti Subba Rao	6,133	13.51%	
KMPP	Nimmaraju Venkateswarlu	4,723	10.40%	
Independent	Gudipudi Vandanam	2,135	4.70%	
Independent	K. Satyanarayana	1,409	3.10%	
Margin of victory		10,467	23.06%	
Turnout		45,397	59.79%	
Registered electors		75,933		
CPI win (new seat)				

=== 1967 ===
1967 Andhra Pradesh Legislative Assembly election: Chilakaluripet
Party	Candidate	Votes	%	±%
SWA	Kandimalla Butchaiah	29,899	47.36%	
INC	V.Nuti	29,227	46.29%	
Margin of victory		672	1.06%	
Turnout		66,143	79.87%	
Registered electors		82,812		
SWA win (new seat)				

=== 1972 ===
1972 Andhra Pradesh Legislative Assembly election: Chilakaluripet
Party	Candidate	Votes	%	±%
INC	Bobbala Satyanarayana	37,856	58.57%	
SWA	Kandimalla Butchaiah	26,780	41.43%	
Margin of victory		11,076	17.14%	
Turnout		66,241	69.85%	
Registered electors		94,832		
INC gain from SWA		Swing		

=== 1978 ===
1978 Andhra Pradesh Legislative Assembly election: Chilakaluripet
Party	Candidate	Votes	%	±%
INC(I)	Somepalli Sambaiah	42,392	52.60%	
JP	Bhimireddy Subba Reddy	24,929	30.93%	
INC	Pavuluri Venkateswarlu	11,726	14.55%	
Independent	Batchu Ramalingamu	853	1.06%	
Margin of victory		17,463	21.67%	
Turnout		82,321	70.93%	
Registered electors		116,057		
INC(I) gain from INC		Swing		

=== 1983 ===
1983 Andhra Pradesh Legislative Assembly election: Chilakaluripet
Party	Candidate	Votes	%	±%
TDP	Krishna Murthy Kaza	56,812	63.86%	
INC	Somepalli Sambaiah	31,146	36.14%	
Margin of victory		24,666	27.73%	
Turnout		90,537	69.01%	
Registered electors		131,198		
TDP gain from INC(I)		Swing		

=== 1985 ===
1985 Andhra Pradesh Legislative Assembly election: Chilakaluripet
Party	Candidate	Votes	%	±%
INC	Somepalli Sambaiah	49,397	51.10%	
TDP	Manam Venkateswarlu	44,519	46.05%	
Margin of victory		4,878	5.05%	
Turnout		98,019	72.53%	
Registered electors		135,149		
gain from TDP		Swing		

=== 1989 ===
1989 Andhra Pradesh Legislative Assembly election: Chilakaluripet
Party	Candidate	Votes	%	±%
TDP	Kandimalla Jayamma	55,857	49.84%	
INC	Somepalli Sambaiah	54,908	48.99%	
Margin of victory		949	0.85%	
Turnout		112,991	67.43%	
Registered electors		167,560		
TDP gain from INC		Swing		

=== 1994 ===
1994 Andhra Pradesh Legislative Assembly election: Chilakaluripet
Party	Candidate	Votes	%	±%
INC	Somepalli Sambaiah	52,650	48.02%	
TDP	Malempati Venkata Narasimha Rao	52,519	47.90%	
Margin of victory		131	0.12%	
Turnout		111,606	65.45%	
Registered electors		170,525		
INC gain from TDP		Swing		

=== 1999 ===
1999 Andhra Pradesh Legislative Assembly election: Chilakaluripet
Party	Candidate	Votes	%	±%
TDP	Prathipati Pulla Rao	68,708	59.28%	
INC	Somepalli Sambaiah	42,467	36.64%	
Margin of victory		26,241	22.64%	
Turnout		117,881	64.29%	
Registered electors		183,363		
TDP gain from INC		Swing		

=== 2004 ===
2004 Andhra Pradesh Legislative Assembly election: Chilakaluripet
Party	Candidate	Votes	%	±%
Independent	Marri Rajashekar	59,214	45.87	
TDP	Prathipati Pulla Rao	59,002	45.70	−13.58
INC	Malladi Siva Narayana	7838	6.30	
Majority		212	0.17	
Turnout		124,725	73.68	+10.44
Registered electors		169,288		
Independent gain from TDP		Swing		

=== 2009 ===
2009 Andhra Pradesh Legislative Assembly election: Chilakaluripet
Party	Candidate	Votes	%	±%
TDP	Prathipati Pulla Rao	77,399	49.98	
INC	Marri Rajashekar	57,586	37.18	
PRP	Posani Krishna Murali	14,201	9.17	
Majority		19,813	12.80	
Turnout		154,864	81.86	+8.18
Registered electors		189,173		
TDP gain from Independent		Swing		

=== 2014 ===
2014 Andhra Pradesh Legislative Assembly election: Chilakaluripet
Party	Candidate	Votes	%	±%
TDP	Prathipati Pulla Rao	89,591	51.70	
YSRCP	Marri Rajasekhar	78,907	45.50	
Majority		10,684	6.20	
Turnout		173,730	86.40	+5.54
Registered electors		201,214		
TDP hold		Swing		

=== 2019 ===
2019 Andhra Pradesh Legislative Assembly election: Chilakaluripet
Party	Candidate	Votes	%	±%
YSRCP	Vidadala Rajini	94,430	50.2	
TDP	Prathipati Pulla Rao	86,129	45.79	
JSP	Nageswara Rao Gade	2,958	1.57	
Majority		8,301	4.43	
Turnout		193,340	86.32%	
Registered electors		223,976		
YSRCP gain from TDP		Swing		

=== 2024 ===
2024 Andhra Pradesh Legislative Assembly election: Chilakaluripet
Party	Candidate	Votes	%	±%
TDP	Prathipati Pulla Rao	111,062	56.84	▲11.05
YSRCP	Kavati Siva Naga Manohar Naidu	77,800	39.82	▼10.38
INC	Maddula Radha Krishna	2,270	1.16	▼0.38
NOTA	None Of The Above	788	0.4	▲0.08
Majority		33,262	17.02	▲12.59
Turnout		1,95,400		
TDP gain from YSRCP		Swing		

== See also ==
- List of constituencies of Andhra Pradesh Legislative Assembly
