= Vunukuru Assembly constituency =

Constituency of the Andhra Pradesh legislative assembly, India

Coordinates: 18.53°N 83.67°E

Vunukuru
- Former constituency for the Andhra Pradesh Legislative Assembly

Constituency details
- Country: India
- Region: South India
- State: Andhra Pradesh
- District: Srikakulam
- Established: 1967
- Abolished: 2008
- Reservation: None

Vunukuru Assembly constituency was an assembly constituency of the Andhra Pradesh Legislative Assembly, India. It was one of ten constituencies in Srikakulam district.

== Overview ==
It was part of Srikakulam Lok Sabha constituency along with another six Vidhan Sabha segments, namely, Palasa, Tekkali, Ichchapuram, Pathapatnam, Srikakulam and Narasannapeta.

== Members of the Legislative Assembly (Vunukuru) ==
Year	Member	Political party
1955	Chelikani Sreeranga Naikulu	Krishikar Lok Party
1962	Palavalasa Sangamnaidu	Indian National Congress
1967	M. B. Parankusam	Independent politician
1972	Palavalasa Rukminamma	Indian National Congress
1978	Mudili Babu Parankusam	Janata Party
1983	Kimidi Kalavenkata Rao	Telugu Desam Party
1985	Kimidi Kalavenkata Rao	Telugu Desam Party
1989	Kimidi Kalavenkata Rao	Telugu Desam Party
1994	Palavalasa Rajasekharam	Indian National Congress
1999	Kimidi Ganapathi Rao	Telugu Desam Party
2004	Kimidi Kalavenkata Rao	Telugu Desam Party

== Members of the Legislative Assembly (Honjaram) ==
Year	Member	Political party
1952	Peesuputi Pundareekakshacharyulu	Krishikar Lok Party

== Members of the Legislative Assembly (Boddam) ==
Year	Member	Political party
1962	Allu Dasavatharam	Indian National Congress

== Election results (Vunukuru) ==
=== 1955 ===
1955 Andhra State Legislative Assembly election: Vunukuru
Party	Candidate	Votes	%	±%
KLP	Chelikani Sreeranga Naikulu	14,838	39.70	▲3.03
Independent	Palavalasa Sangamnaidu	12,019	32.16	
CPI	Mudili Babu Parankusam	10,515	28.14	
Majority		2,819	7.54	▲5.6
Turnout		37,372	58.12	▲2.51
KLP hold		Swing		

=== 1962 ===
1962 Andhra Pradesh Legislative Assembly election: Vunukuru
Party	Candidate	Votes	%	±%
INC	Palavalasa Sangamnaidu	16,910	64.79	
CPI	Mudili Babu Parankusam	9,187	35.20	▲7.06
Majority		7,723	29.59	▲22.05
Turnout		26,097		
INC gain from KLP		Swing		

=== 1967 ===
1967 Andhra Pradesh Legislative Assembly election: Vunukuru
Party	Candidate	Votes	%	±%
Independent	Mudili Parankusam	22,047	45.32	▲10.12
INC	P. Sangamnaidu	11,545	23.73	▼41.06
Independent	V. Raj Rao	9,556	19.64	
CPI(M)	B. Appalanaidu	3,992	8.21	
Independent	K. Satyannarayana	1,055	3.09	
Majority		10,502	21.59	▼8
Turnout		48,645	70.75	
Independent gain from INC		Swing		

=== 1972 ===
1972 Andhra Pradesh Legislative Assembly election: Vunukuru
Party	Candidate	Votes	%	±%
INC	Palavalasa Rukminamma	28,572	48.32	▲24.59
Independent	Mudili Parankusah	15,020	25.40	
Independent	Mamidirajagopala Naidu	13,843	23.41	
Independent	Palavalasa Balaramaswamy	1,280	2.16	
Independent	Setti Subbi Naidu	418	0.71	
Majority		13,552	22.92	▲1.33
Turnout		59,133	70.91	▲0.16
INC gain from Independent		Swing		

=== 1978 ===
1978 Andhra Pradesh Legislative Assembly election: Vunukuru
Party	Candidate	Votes	%	±%
JP	Mudili Parankusam	26,617	36.28	▲10.88
INC	Rimkinamma Palavalasa	20,030	27.30	▼21.02
INC(I)	K. Rao	14,544	19.82	New
Independent	Shivaramunaidu Gullipalli	10,622	14.48	New
Independent	Setti Subbi Naidu	1,553	2.12	▲1.41
Majority		6,587	8.98	▼13.94
Turnout		73,366	78.97	▲8.06
JP gain from INC		Swing		

=== 1983 ===
1983 Andhra Pradesh Legislative Assembly election: Vunukuru
Party	Candidate	Votes	%	±%
TDP	Kimidi Kalavenkata Rao	47,735	64.1	
INC	Palavalasa Rajasekharam	24,354	32.7	▲5.4
LKD	Tirupathirao Vakamulla	2,392	3.2	
Majority		23,381	30.7	▲22
Turnout		76,261	75.9	▼3.1
TDP gain from JP		Swing		

=== 1985 ===
1985 Andhra Pradesh Legislative Assembly election: Vunukuru
Party	Candidate	Votes	%	±%
TDP	Kimidi Kalavenkata Rao	49,843	66.3	▲2.2
INC	Kemburu Rao	22,498	29.9	▼2.8
Independent	Gedela Naidu	1,552	2.1	
Independent	P.M.J.Mugada Ellan Naidu	678	0.9	New
Independent	Majji Suryanarayana	340	0.5	
Independent	Ragolu Nageswara Rao	310	0.4	
Majority		27,345	35.7	▲5
Turnout		76,673	71.3	▼4.9
TDP hold		Swing		

=== 1989 ===
1989 Andhra Pradesh Legislative Assembly election: Vunukuru
Party	Candidate	Votes	%	±%
TDP	Kimidi Kalavenkata Rao	49,612	51.2	▼15.1
INC	Kambala Rajvardhan	2,214	1.4	▼1.9
Majority		2,237	2.2	▼33.5
Turnout		101,152	77.7	▲6.4
TDP hold		Swing		

==== 1994 ====
1994 Andhra Pradesh Legislative Assembly election: Vunukuru
Party	Candidate	Votes	%	±%
INC	Palavalasa Rajasekharam	53,559	50.4	▲1.5
TDP	Kala Kimidi	49,301	46.4	▼4.8
BJP	Damodara Rao Buri	2,755	2.6	New
BSP	Arasada Suguna	621	0.6	New
Independent	Pogiri Ravana Naidu	106	0.1	New
Majority		4,258	3.9	▲1.7
Turnout		109,245	78.3	▲0.6
INC gain from TDP		Swing		

=== 1999 ===
1999 Andhra Pradesh Legislative Assembly election: Vunukuru
Party	Candidate	Votes	%	±%
TDP	Kimidi Kalavenkata Rao	57,659	53.1	▼1.6
INC	Palavalasa Rajasekharam	46,171	42.5	▼0.8
CPI(M)	Bhaviri Murthy	4,564	4.2	
Independent	Botcha Tammi Naidu	293	0.3	▼1.8
Majority		11,488	10.2	▼1.2
Turnout		12,550	72.9	▼3.1
TDP hold		Swing		

== Election results (Honjaram) ==
=== 1952 ===
1952 Madras State Legislative Assembly election: Honjaram
Party	Candidate	Votes	%	±%
KLP	Peesuputi Pundareekakshacharyulu	16,731	36.67%	
Independent	Chelikami Sreeranganayakulu	15,846	34.73%	
INC	Pydi Narasimha Appa Rao	13,051	28.60%	28.60%
Margin of victory		885	1.94%	
Turnout		45,628	55.61%	
Registered electors		82,048		
KLP win (new seat)				

== See also ==
- List of constituencies of Andhra Pradesh Legislative Assembly
