= Prathipati Pulla Rao =

Indian politician

Pathipati Pulla Rao
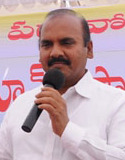
- Rao in 2014

Minister for Food & Civil Supplies, Price Monitoring and Consumer Affairs; Government of Andhra Pradesh
- In office 2 April 2017 – 29 May 2019
- Governor: E. S. L. Narasimhan
- Chief Minister: N. Chandrababu Naidu
- Preceded by: Paritala Sunitha
- Succeeded by: Kodali Nani

Minister for Agriculture, Horticulture, Sericulture & Agri-Processing; Government of Andhra Pradesh
- In office 8 June 2014 – 2 April 2017
- Governor: E. S. L. Narasimhan
- Chief Minister: N. Chandrababu Naidu
- Preceded by: President's Rule
- Succeeded by: Somireddy Chandra Mohan Reddy

Member of Legislative Assembly Andhra Pradesh
- Incumbent
- Assumed office 2024
- Preceded by: Vidadala Rajini
- Constituency: Chilakaluripet
- In office 2009–2019
- Preceded by: Marri Rajasekhar
- Succeeded by: Vidadala Rajini
- Constituency: Chilakaluripet
- In office 1999–2004
- Preceded by: Somepalli Sambaiah
- Succeeded by: Marri Rajasekhar
- Constituency: Chilakaluripet

Personal details
- Born: 29 May 1958 (age 67)
- Party: Telugu Desam Party
- Spouse: P. V. Kumari
- Children: 2 (son & daughter)
- Parents: P. Subba Rao (father); P. Narayanamma (mother)
- Education: B.Com (1978-1981)
- Alma mater: VRS & YRN College, Chirala, Andhra Pradesh
- Profession: Politician; Businessperson

Pathipati Pulla Rao popularly known as Pathipati is an Indian politician who formerly worked as Cabinet Minister in Andhra Pradesh Government between 2014 and 2019. Currently, he is the Member of Andhra Pradesh Legislative Assembly from Chilakaluripet. He was elected four times to Assembly of Andhra Pradesh.

He belongs to Telugu Desam Party of which he was first elected as the legislator in 1999. Following 1999, he was defeated by Marri Rajasekhar in 2004 Andhra Pradesh General Assembly Election. He was again elected in 2009 and 2014 from the Chilakaluripet. Between 2014 and 2019, he served as Cabinet Minister and held various portfolios like Agriculture, Agri-Processing, Marketing and warehousing, Animal Husbandry, Dairy Development, Fisheries, Food & Civil Supplies, Price-Monitoring and Consumer Affairs.

== Personal life ==
He lives in the Chilakaluripet, Guntur District of the state of Andhra Pradesh. Prathipati Pulla Rao's (60yrs) father's name is Shri Subba Rao. Pulla Rao married Smt. P. V. Kumari who is a housewife. He has two children Swathi and Sarath Babu.

== Education ==
His highest educational qualification is B.Com. He pursued his B.Com. Pass from VRS and YRN College, Chirala (Andhra University) in the years 1978 to 1981. He did his intermediate studies from T.J.P.S. College, Guntur in the year 1977. By profession, he is a businessman; he is the director of various companies.

== Leadership ==
Pulla Rao has always placed an emphasis on supporting farmers. In 2015, Prathipati Pulla Rao took part in the Telugu Desam Party's JanaChaitanya Yatra in Gudivada town of Krishna district. In that year a total of 2,60,000 hectares of paddy crops were lost in the state due to heavy rains. Nearly 6,000 hectares of fish and prawn cultures were damaged due to rains, therefore he asked the union government to sanction a large amount to Andhra Pradesh and help the farmers.

== Election Statistics ==
	Year	Contested For	Party	Constituency	Opponent	Votes	Majority	Result
1	1999	MLA	Telugu Desam Party	Chilakaluripet	Somepalli Sambaiah (INC)	68708 - 42467	26,241	Won
2	2004	MLA	Telugu Desam Party	Chilakaluripet	Marri Rajasekhar (IND)	57002 - 57214	-212	Lost
3	2009	MLA	Telugu Desam Party	Chilakaluripet	Marri Rajasekhar (INC)	77399- 57586	19,813	Won
4	2014	MLA	Telugu Desam Party	Chilakaluripet	Marri Rajasekhar (YSRCP)	89591 - 78907	10,684	Won
5	2019	MLA	Telugu Desam Party	Chilakaluripet	Vidadala Rajini (YSRCP)	86129 - 94430	-8,301	Lost
6	2024	MLA	Telugu Desam Party	Chilakaluripet	Kavati Manohar Naidu (YSRCP)	111062- 77800	31,302	Won
