= Sathivada Assembly constituency =

Former constituency of the Andhra Pradesh legislative assembly, India

Coordinates: 18.17°N 83.55°E

Sathivada
- Former constituency for the Andhra Pradesh Legislative Assembly

Constituency details
- Country: India
- Region: South India
- State: Andhra Pradesh
- District: Vizianagaram
- Established: 1967
- Abolished: 2008
- Reservation: None

Sathivada Assembly constituency was an Assembly constituency of the Andhra Pradesh Legislative Assembly, India until 2008. It was one of nine constituencies in Vizianagaram district.

== Overview ==
It was a part of Araku Lok Sabha constituency along with another six Vidhan Sabha segments, namely, Palakonda, Parvathipuram, Salur, Araku Valley, Paderu and Rampachodavaram.

== Members of Legislative Assembly ==
Year	Member	Political party
1967	Meesala Akku Naidu	Indian National Congress
1978	Penumatsa Sambasiva Raju	Indian National Congress
1983	Penumatsa Sambasiva Raju	Indian National Congress
1985	Penumatsa Sambasiva Raju	Indian National Congress
1989	Penumatsa Sambasiva Raju	Indian National Congress
1994	Potnuru Suryanarayana	Telugu Desam Party
1999	Penumatsa Sambasiva Raju	Indian National Congress
2004	Penumatsa Sambasiva Raju	Indian National Congress

== Election ==
=== 2004 ===
2004 Indian general elections: Sathivada
Party	Candidate	Votes	%	±%
INC	Penumatsa Sambasiva Raju			
Majority				
Turnout				
INC hold		Swing		

== See also ==
- List of constituencies of Andhra Pradesh Legislative Assembly
