= Vidadala Rajini =

Indian politician

Vidadala Rajini Mudhiraj

Minister for Health, Family Welfare and Medical Education Government of Andhra Pradesh
- In office 11 April 2022 – 11 June 2024
- Governor: Biswabhusan Harichandan (2022–2023); S. Abdul Nazeer (2023–present)
- Chief Minister: Y. S. Jagan Mohan Reddy
- Preceded by: Alla Nani

Member of Legislative Assembly Andhra Pradesh
- In office 2019–2024
- Preceded by: Prathipati Pulla Rao
- Succeeded by: Prathipati Pulla Rao
- Constituency: Chilakaluripet

Personal details
- Born: 24 June 1990
- Party: YSR Congress Party
- Other political affiliations: Telugu Desam Party

Vidadala Rajini (born 24 June 1990) is an Indian politician from Andhra Pradesh. She was the former Minister for Health, Family Welfare, and Medical Education in the Government of Andhra Pradesh.

== Career ==
She previously served as a Member of Legislative Assembly representing the Chilakaluripet Assembly constituency in Andhra Pradesh. She contested the 2019 Andhra Pradesh Legislative Assembly election as a candidate of the YSR Congress Party and won by defeating the Telugu Desam Party candidate, Prathipati Pulla Rao.
