= Perni Krishna Murthy =

Indian politician

Perni Krishnamurthy is an Indian politician from Andhra Pradesh. He is a former member of the Andhra Pradesh Legislative Assembly and a minister in the N. Janardhana Reddy cabinet. He was elected from the Bandar Assembly constituency in the 1989 Andhra Pradesh Legislative Assembly election representing the Indian National Congress (Indira).

== Career ==
Murthy first contested as an MLA from the Bandar Assembly constituency in the 1983 Andhra Pradesh Legislative Assembly election as an Indian National Congress (Indira) candidate. He polled 17,757 votes but lost to Borra Venkataswami of the Telugu Desam Party, by 25,341 votes. He contested again on the Congress ticket in the 1989 Andhra Pradesh Legislative Assembly election and won the Bandar seat. He polled 51,952 votes and defeated his nearest rival, Nadakuditi Narsimha Rao of the Telugu Desam Party, by 7,903 votes. He lost the 1994 Andhra Pradesh Legislative Assembly election to Ambati Brahmanaiah of the TDP by 16,278 votes.
