= Sambani Chandrashekar =

Indian politician

Sambhani Chandrasekhar is an Indian politician from Telangana state. He served four times as an MLA and two times as a minister in the united state of Andhra Pradesh . From 1989 to 1994, Marighu served as the Minister of Health and Medicine from 2004 to 2009.

== Political career ==
Chandrasekhar entered politics through the Congress Party in 1983 and contested from Paleru constituency and lost. He won as an MLA in 1999 and 2004 assembly elections and served as Minister of Health and Medical Affairs in Y. S. Rajasekhara Reddy's cabinet. Chandrasekhar was appointed as Telangana PCC Vice President on 26 June 2021.

Year	Constituency	The winning candidate	Party	Opponent	Party
1983	Paleru Constituency	Bhimapaka Bhupathi Rao	CPI	Sambhani Chandrasekhar	Congress party
1985	Paleru Constituency	Baji Hanmantu	CPM	Sambhani Chandrasekhar	Congress party
1989	Paleru Constituency	Sambhani Chandrasekhar	Congress party	Baji Hanmantu	CPM
1994	Paleru Constituency	Sandra Venkata Veeraiah	CPM	Sambhani Chandrasekhar	Congress party
1999	Paleru Constituency	Sambhani Chandrasekhar	Congress party	Sandra Venkataweeraiah	CPM
2004	Paleru Constituency	Sambhani Chandrasekhar	Congress party	Sandra Venkata Veeraiah	Telugu Desam Party
2009	Satthupalli Constituency	Sandra Venkataweeraiah	Telugu Desam Party	Sambhani Chandrasekhar	Congress party
2014	Satthupalli Constituency	Sandra Venkata Veeraiah	Telugu Desam Party	Sambhani Chandrasekhar	Congress party
