= Somepalli Sambaiah =

Member of Legislative Assembly Andhra Pradesh
- In office 1994–1999
- Preceded by: Kandimalla Jayamma
- Succeeded by: Prathipati Pulla Rao
- Constituency: Chilakaluripet
- In office 1985–1989
- Preceded by: Khaza Krishna Murthy
- Succeeded by: Kandimalla Jayamma
- Constituency: Chilakaluripet
- In office 1978–1983
- Preceded by: Bobbili Satyanarayana
- Succeeded by: Khaza Krishna Murthy
- Constituency: Chilakaluripet

Somepalli Sambaiah was an English professor and politician. He was elected to the Legislative Assembly (MLA) from Chilakaluripet constituency to the Andhra Pradesh State Assembly.
