= Prathipadu Assembly constituency =

Prathipadu Assembly constituency may refer to

- Prathipadu, Guntur Assembly constituency
- Prathipadu, Kakinada Assembly constituency
