= Nyalakonda Ramkishan Rao =

Indian politician

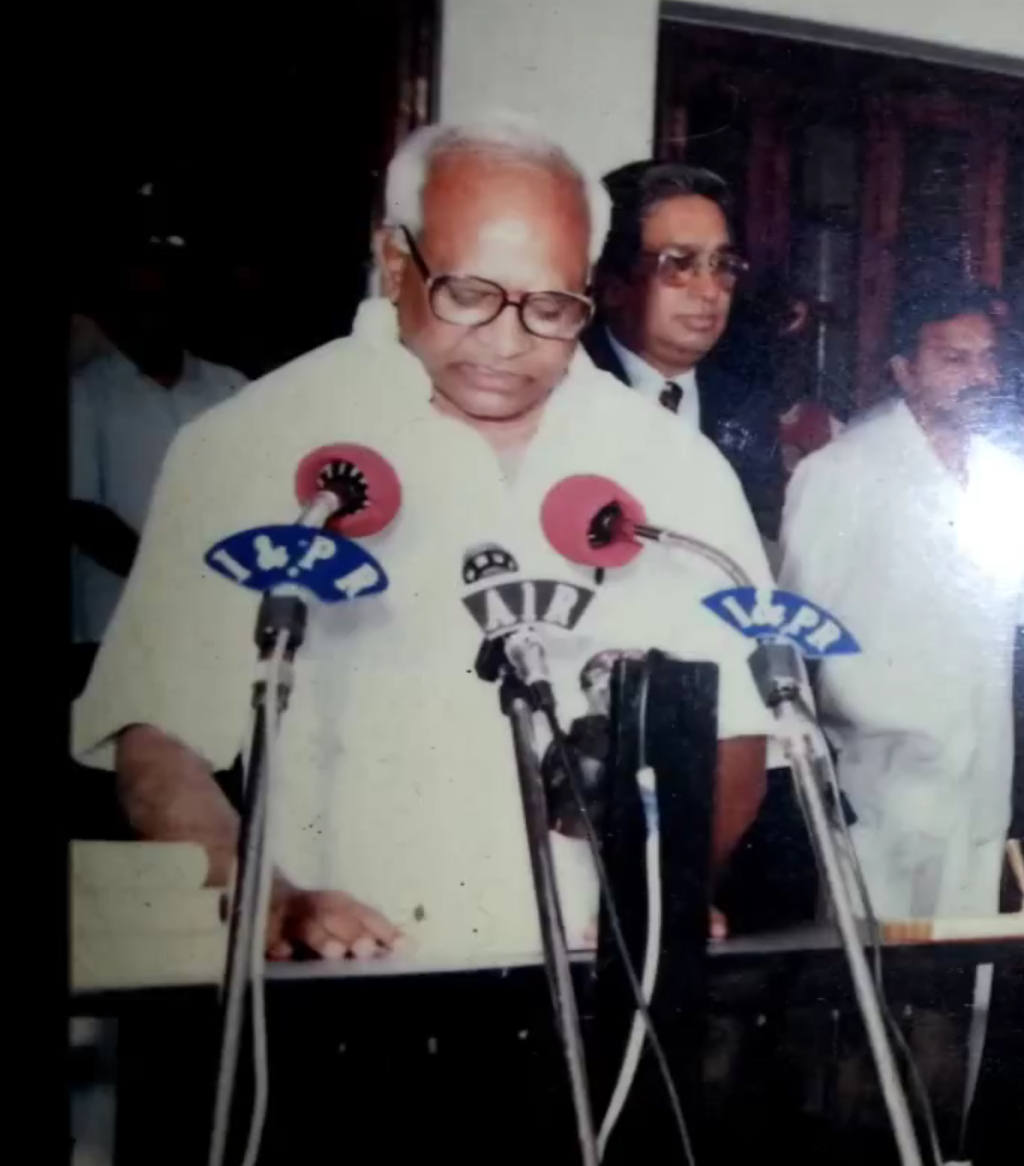

Former Minister & MLA

Personal details
- Born: 9 May 1940 (age 86) Gangadhara, Karimnagar, Hyderabad State (now Telangana, India)
- Party: Telugu Desam Party (1982–2004)
- Other political affiliations: Indian National Congress (2005–2009)
- Spouse: Sukanya Rao
- Children: Sri. A. Anupama Reddy; Sri. J. Anuradha Reddy; Sri. E. Aravinda Reddy
- Education: Osmania University, Hyderabad

Nyalakonda Ramkishan Rao, popularly known as Kishan Rao, was a three time M.L.A and a cabinet minister of the Indian state of Andhra Pradesh, he has been in active politics for more than three decades.

== Career ==
Nyalakonda Ramkishan Rao was elected to the Andhra Pradesh Legislative assembly for three consecutive times from Choppadandi constituency and served as Minister of Forest, Environment & Pollution Control. "He won with a record majority of nearly 42,000 votes in 1985 which was one of the highest majority throughout the state and continued the victory spree till 1994". He lost the election in 1999 with a very small margin of 1918 votes after which he never contested again though he was the election in charge of Karimnagar after 1999. His exclusion from the list of candidates for 2004 elections was highly opposed and debated across the state. Many locals claim that his firm stance towards the empowerment of the poor, his image of being a non-corrupt peoples leader and his growing influence in karimnagar and the overall state politics all played a part to his ouster. Many political spokesperson also point that being straightforward, honest and daring enough to even oppose the leader of his own party for the betterment of the poor were major reasons for him being politically sidelined. However, being someone who has spent his entire life for public service he continued in actively serving the people till 2004. His popularity and strong following made easy election for Sana Maruthi in (2004) who was not a local candidate of Choppadandi and was opposed by the locals . The reservation of his home constituency Choppadandi in 2009 finally made him retire from active politics forever. He played a crucial role in formation of TDP government in 1994. He also headed the core-committee team which transferred the party and its authority from N.T.Rama Rao to N. Chandrababu Naidu. He worked in N. T. Rama Rao's and N. Chandrababu Naidu's governments for various important committees. Even after his exit from politics he has continued in the field of public service and plays a key role in influencing the voters of Choppadandi constituency. He openly supported Suddala devaiah in 2009 helping to ease to a victory over Gonukonda babu. Sana Maruthi, who was given a chance in 2004 is also an example of how influential a figure he is in the Choppadandi constituency. He introduced many leaders to politics like L. Ramana, Sai Reddy, Sana Maruthi etc.

== Positions held ==
- Sarpanch(1973-1978)
- Samithi vice president(1978-1983)
- Member of Legislative Assembly AP (1985-1989)
- Member of Legislative Assembly AP (1989-1994)
- Minister of Forest, Environment & Pollution Control (1997-1999)
- Member of Legislative Assembly AP (1994-1999)
- Election in charge for District Of Karimnagar(1999-2004)

== Personal life ==
Kishan Rao was born in Gangadhara village, Karimnagar, Telangana on 9 May 1940 to Nyalakonda Janardhan Rao Bahadur Reddy and Sunandha Rao Bahadur Reddy. He completed his degree in Osmania University and was an activist in the Telangana movement during his education. He was married to Sukanya Reddy. They had three daughters: A. Anupama Reddy, J. Anuradha Reddy, E. Aravinda Reddy. His uncle Nyalakonda Sripathi Rao also served as an MLA from 1978 to 1983.
