= Penumatsa Sambasiva Raju =

Indian politician (1933–2020)

Member of the Legislative Assembly, Andhra Pradesh
- In office 1999–2009
- Preceded by: Potnuru Suryanarayana
- Succeeded by: Constituency abolished
- Constituency: Sathivada
- In office 1978–1994
- Preceded by: Meesala Akku Naidu
- Succeeded by: Potnuru Suryanarayana
- Constituency: Sathivada
- In office 1967–1978
- Preceded by: Taddi Sanayasi Naidu
- Succeeded by: Vangapandu Narayanappala Naidu
- Constituency: Gajapathinagaram

Personal details
- Born: 1933
- Died: 10 August 2020 (aged 86–87)
- Party: Indian National Congress

Penumatsa Sambasiva Raju (1933 – 10 August 2020) was an Indian politician from Andhra Pradesh. He was an eight-time member of Andhra Pradesh Legislative Assembly and a former minister in the undivided Andhra Pradesh. He was the only MLA who won eight time in the united Andhra Pradesh.

== Early life and education ==
Raju hails from Mayida Vijayarampuram village in Nellimarla mandal, Vizianagaram district.

== Career ==
Raju won as MLA for a record eight times. He served as a transport minister in the Marri Chenna Reddy cabinet from 1989 to 1992. He was also a Minister during the Chief Ministerial tenure of N. Janardhan Reddy in 1992–93. He began his political career as a Panchayat Samithi president in 1958. He was elected as an MLA for the first time in 1967 as an independent candidate from Gajapathinagaram Constituency. Again he was the MLA from Gajapathinagaram Constituency in 1972 representing Indian National Congress. In the 1978 Andhra Pradesh Legislative Assembly Election he shifted to Sathivada constituency and won on Congress ticket. He retained the Sathivada seat for the Congress in 1983 and 1989 elections. Sathivada is now the Nellimarla constituency. He lost the election in 1994. He was considered as a guide and mentor for many political leaders including Botsa Satyanarayana and Kolagatla Veerabhadra Swamy.

=== Death ===
Raju died at a private hospital in Visakhapatnam. He was hospitalised after a fall in his house. His last rites were performed with state honours. He is survived by his two sons and a daughter. One of his sons, P. V. V. Suryanarayana Raju, was an MLC with YSR Congress Party. His other son P. Suresh, who is a doctor, became an MLC in 2020 by YSRCP after the death of Raju senior. His grandson Krishnudu is an actor.
