= Palavalasa Rajasekharam =

Indian politician (1945–2025)

Member of the Andhra Pradesh Legislative Assembly
- In office 1994–1999
- Preceded by: Kimidi Kalavenkata Rao
- Succeeded by: Kimidi Ganapathi Rao
- Constituency: Vunukuru
- In office 3 April 1976 – 2 April 1982
- Constituency: Andhra Pradesh

Personal details
- Born: 1 January 1945 Neelanagaram, Veeraghattam mandal, Parvathipuram Manyam district, Madras Province, British India
- Died: 13 January 2025 (aged 80) Srikakulam, Andhra Pradesh, India
- Party: YSR Congress Party (2011–2025)
- Other political affiliations: Indian National Congress (until 2011)
- Spouse: Indumati
- Children: Palavalasa Vikranth, Reddy Shanthi
- Occupation: Politician

Palavalasa Rajasekharam (1 January 1945 – 13 January 2025) was an Indian politician and member of the Andhra Pradesh Legislative Assembly from Vunukuru.

== Positions held ==
- 1970, Neela Nagaram Sarpanch
- 1974 to 1976, Zilla Parishad (ZP) chairman for undivided Srikakulam and Vizianagaram districts
- 1976 to 1982, Member of Parliament, Rajya Sabha
- 1992 to 1994, Srikakulam District Cooperative Central Bank (DCCB) chairman
- 1994 to 1999, Member of the Andhra Pradesh Legislative Assembly - Vunukuru

== Death ==
Rajasekharam suffered from a serious illness and underwent treatment at a private hospital in Srikakulam, where he died on 13 January 2025, at the age of 80.
