= Janardan =

Janardan is a given name and may refer to the following notable people:

- Janardan Chakravarti (1901–1987), renowned scholar in Vaishnav literature and a celebrated professor of Bengali
- Janardan Dhakal, member of 2nd Nepalese Constituent Assembly
- Janardan Dwivedi, Indian politician of the Indian National Congress party
- Janardan Singh Gehlot, Indian sports administrator
- Rajeev Janardan (born 1967), Indian classical sitar player of the Imdadkhani gharana (school)
- Shrikrishna Janardan Joshi (1915–1989), Marathi novelist from Maharashtra, India
- Vinayak Janardan Karandikar (1872–1909), major poet of the Marathi language of India
- Janardan Manjhi (1943–2021), Indian politician
- Janardan Mishra, member of the Bharatiya Janata Party and 2014 winner in the Indian general election
- Janardan Navle (1902–1979), early Indian Test cricketer
- Janardan Ganpatrao Negi (born 1936), Indian theoretical geophysicist, emeritus scientist at National Geophysical Research Institute
- Janardan Paswan, Indian politician and two-time elected member from Chatra Vidhan Sabha constituency to Bihar and Jharkhand assembly
- Shanta Janardan Shelke (1922–2002), Marathi poet and writer in the Marathi language
- Janardan Singh Sigriwal, Indian politician of Bharatiya Janata Party
- Janardan Swami or Janardana (born 1504), Indian scholar, a Deshpande or Deshastha Brahmin from Chalisgaon
- Janardan Tiwari, Indian politician
- Janardan Waghmare, Indian politician and a member of the Rajya Sabha, the upper house of the Indian Parliament
- Janardan Yadav, Indian politician

== See also ==
- Janardan Rai Nagar Rajasthan Vidyapeeth, deemed university in the city of Udaipur in the Indian state of Rajasthan
- Jann Arden, Canadian singer-songwriter
- Janardana
- Janardhan (disambiguation)
- Janardhanan (disambiguation)
