= Janardhan =

Janardhan is one of the names of Hindu Lord Krishna.

Janardhan may also refer to:

- Bank Janardhan (born 1948), Indian actor
- Boda Janardhan (born 1958), Indian politician
- Janardhan Reddy (disambiguation), several people
- Janardhan Sharma (born 1963), Nepalese politician
- P. Janardhan Reddy (1948–2007), Indian politician
- G. Janardhana Reddy (born 1967–) Indian politician and Industrialist (Former Minister of Tourism Department and Infrastructure Development of Karnataka from 30 May 2008 to 3 August 2011)

== See also ==
- Janardan, a given name
- Janardhanan (disambiguation)
