= Swathi Sangeethotsavam =

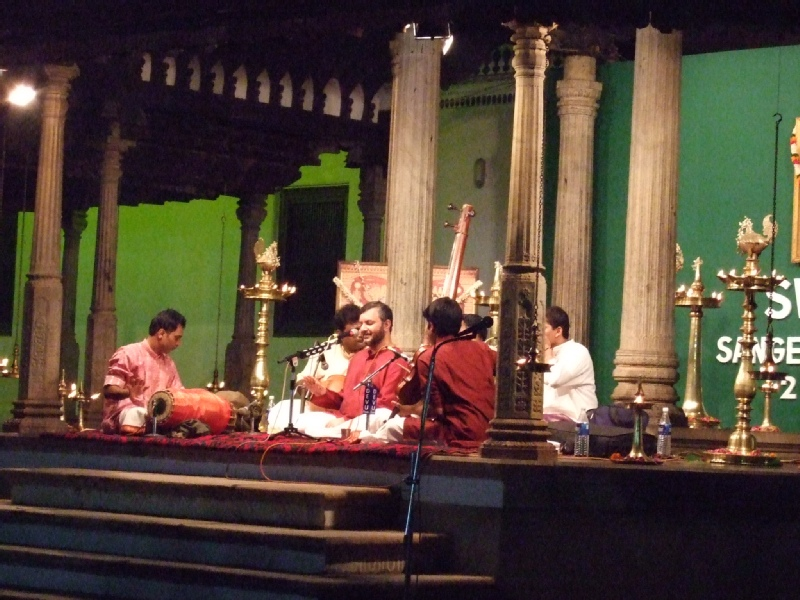
- Rama Varma performing at Swathi Sangeethotsavam
- Dates: Every year from 4 January to 13 January
- Locations: Thiruvananthapuram, India
- Organiser: Prince Rama Varma and Sir Rama Varma Maharaja of Travancore Trust

Swathi Sangeethotsavam (Swathi Music Festival) is a ten-day festival of music celebrating the compositions of Maharaja Swathi Thirunal. The festival is held from 4 to 13 January every year at Kuthira Malika, Thiruvananthapuram, where the Maharaja is believed to have composed many of his works. The festival is a tribute to Swathi Tirunal and is exclusively dedicated to his compositions. The concerts are not ticketed. The festival is conducted by Rama Varma Maharaja of Travancore Trust under the helm of Prince Rama Varma.

== History ==
The Government of Kerala used to conduct the festival in Kuthiramalika in memory of Swathi Thirunal. In the late 90s, after they decided to hold it in different places all over Kerala and discontinued the festival at Kuthiramalika, Rama Varma Maharaja took the initiative to continue the annual festival under the Travancore Trust. The festival is organized by Prince Rama Varma, Carnatic musician and direct descendant of Swathi Tirunal.

== List of events ==
Year	Date	Headliners
2004	6–12 Jan.	Ranjani & Gayathri, Aswathi Tirunal Rama Varma, Kudamaloor Janardanan, M.S.Sheela, Ajoy Chakrabarti, P. Unni Krishnan, Dr. M.Balamuralikrishna
2005	6–12 Jan.	Kudamaloor Janardanan, Aswathi Thirunal Rama Varma, Kiranavali Vidyashankar, Pantula Rama, V.Vamanan, Pandit Venkatesh Kumar, T. M. Krishna
2006	6–12 Jan.	Sanjay Subrahmanyan, Pandit Virabhadriah Hiremath, V.V. Subramanyam, Gayathri Venkataraghavan, Malladi Brothers, K. Omanakutty
2007	6–12 Jan.	Sanjay Subrahmanyan, S.K.S. Hariharasubramanian, Sangeetha Sivakumar, T. M. Krishna, Trichy B. Sivakumar
2008	6–13 Jan.	Sanjay Subrahmanyan, Prince Rama Varma, Manasi Prasad, Prof. Venkatesh Kumar, Master Balamuralikrishna, Parasala B. Ponnammal, Lalgudi GJR Krishnan and Vijayalakshmi (violin duet), Dr. M. Balamuralikrishna
2009	6–15 Jan.	Sanjay Subrahmanyan, Malladi Suri Babu, Pandit Venkatesh Kumar, Parasala Ponnammal, Prince Rama Varma (Veena), Amrutha Venkatesh, Kunnakudi M. Balamuralikrishna, Prasanna Venkataraman, Thamarakkad Govindan Namboothiri, Ranjani & Gayathri
2010	6–12 Jan.	Mavelikkara Subrahmanian, Pandit Venkatesh Kumar, Balasai, Aswathi Thirunal Rama Varma, Sanjay Subrahmanyan, Seetha Rajan and Kunnakudi Balamuralikrishna
2011	6–12 Jan.	Ajoy Chakraborty, violin duet by siblings S.R. Mahadeva Sharma and S.R. Rajashree, Vidya Kalyanaraman, R.K. Padmanabha, Aswathi Thirunal Rama Varma, Amrutha Venkatesh
2012	6–12 Jan.	Sanjay Subrahmanyan, Bangalore S. Shankar, Prof. Venkataramanan, Abhradita Banerjee, Aswathi Thirunal Rama Varma, Master Abhilash, Akkarai Sisters
2013	4–13 Jan.	Sanjay Subrahmanyan, Aswathi Thirunal Rama Varma, Master Siddharth, J.B. Shruthisagar (Flute), Amrutha Venkatesh, Sikkil Gurucharan, Ranjini Guruprasad, Ramakrishnan Murthy, Avaneeswaram S R Vinu, Venkataramanan, Debapriya Adhikary, Vighnesh Easwar, O.S. Arun
2014	4–13 Jan.	Sanjay Subrahmanyan, Prince Rama Varma, Amrutha Venkatesh, Parassala B. Ponnammal, Prof.Venkataramanan, T.V. Gopalakrishnan, S. Varadarajan(violin solo), Saurabh Kadgaonkar, Seetha Rajan's Bala Brundam, O.S. Arun
2015	4-13 Jan.	Sanjay Subrahmanyan, Prince Rama Varma, Amrutha Venkatesh, Perumbavoor G. Ravindranath, Avaneeshwaram S.R. Vinu (violin solo), Carnatica Brothers, Ashwath Narayanan, Sandeep Narayan, Pravin Godkhindi (Flute), O.S.Arun
2016	4-13 Jan.	Amrutha Venkatesh, Prince Rama Varma, Kruthi Bhat, J.A. Jayanth (Flute), Uttara Swaminathan, Kashyap Mahesh, Ramnath Venkat Bhagwath, O.S.Arun, Vani Ramamurthi, Sanjay Subrahmanyan
2017	4-13 Jan.	Prince Rama Varma, Amrutha Venkatesh, Aditi Prahlad, O.S. Arun, S. Mahadevan (Veena), Surabhi Pusthakam, Brindha Manickavasakan, Thamarakad Govindan Namboothiri, Amit Nadig (Flute), Kashyap Mahesh, Sanjay Subrahmanyan
2018	4-13 Jan.	Palghat R Ramprasad, Manda Sudharani, S Ashok, M B Hariharan, Tamarakkad Govindan Namboodiri, Amith Nadig, Amrutha Venkatesh, Prince Rama Varma
2019	4-13 Jan.	Prince Rama Varma, Bangalore Sri S. Shankar, Sri Vishnudev Namboodri, Smt Nisha Rajagopalan, Tamarakkad Sri Govindan Namboodri, Sri Sanjay Subrahmanyan

== See also ==
- List of Indian classical music festivals
- Chembai Sangeetholsavam
- Kuthira Malika
- Swathi Sangeetha Puraskaram
