= Danam Nagender =

Indian politician (born 1964)

Member of Telangana Legislative Assembly
- In office 11 December 2018 – 22 April 2024
- Preceded by: C. Ramachandra Reddy
- Constituency: Khairatabad

Member of Andhra Pradesh Legislative Assembly
- In office 2009–2014
- Preceded by: P. Vishnuvardhan Reddy
- Succeeded by: Telangana assembly established
- Constituency: Khairatabad

Personal details
- Born: 9 August 1964 (age 62) Hyderabad, Andhra Pradesh, India
- Party: Indian National Congress(1985-2017)(2024 - present)
- Other political affiliations: BRS (2017-2024)

Danam Nagender (born 9 August 1964) is an Indian politician and Member of the Legislative Assembly from Khairatabad Assembly Constituency, Hyderabad, Telangana, India. He left (BRS) Telangana Rashtra Samithi and joined Indian National Congress party in March, 2024. He was the Senior Leader of Congress Party in Hyderabad. He was also Minister for Labour, Employment, Training & Factories, Industrial Training Institutes & Health in United Andhra Pradesh. He had represented the Indian National Congress party. Nagender won his seat in the 2009 Andhra Pradesh State Assembly Elections. He lost it in the 2014 assembly elections. He resigned from Congress party on 23 June 2018, joined Telangana Rashtra Samithi and won from Khairatabad in general election Dec. 2018. He joined Congress party in 2024.

== Electroral History ==
Year	Constituency	Party	Votes	%	Opponent	Party	Votes	%	Result	Margin	%
1989	Asifnagar	INC	31,747	37.66	Syed Sajjad	AIMIM	40,482	48.02	Lost	-8,735	-10.36
1994	Asifnagar	INC	21,431	28.26	Md. Vizarath Rasool Khan	Majlis Bachao Tahreek	19,465	25.67	Won	+1,966	+2.59
1999	Asifnagar	INC	42,822	42.90	Mohammed Virasat Rasool Khan	AIMIM	22,102	22.14	Won	+20,720	+20.76
2004	Asifnagar	TDP	34,001	41.25	Mohd. Abdul Muneem	AIMIM	31,227	37.89	Won	+2,774	+3.36
2004 (Note: By-election)	Asifnagar	INC	21,057	29.40	Mohammed Moazam Khan	AIMIM	32,168	44.88	Lost	-11,111	-15.48
2009	Khairatabad	INC	50,655	39.05	K. Vijaya Rama Rao	TDP	36,797	28.37	Won	+13,858	+10.68
2014	Khairatabad	INC	32,255	22.42	Chintala Ramachandra Reddy	BJP	53,102	36.91	Lost	-20,847	-14.49
2018	Khairatabad	TRS	63,068	44.56	Chintala Ramachandra Reddy	BJP	34,666	24.50	Won	+28,402	+20.06
2023	Khairatabad	BRS	67,368	43.48	P. Vijaya Reddy	INC	45,358	29.28	Won	+22,010	+14.20
2024	Secunderabad	INC	4,23,068	40.38	G. Kishan Reddy	BJP	4,73,012	45.15	Lost	-49,944	-4.77

== Career ==
D. Nagender was elected from Asifnagar assembly constituency in 1994, 1999 and 2004 as a Member of the Legislative Assembly. In the 2004 Andhra Pradesh state Assembly elections, he left the Indian National Congress (INC) for the Telugu Desam Party (TDP). After winning from Asifnagar on the TDP ticket, he resigned his seat and left the TDP in an effort to get a place in the cabinet of Y. S. Rajasekhara Reddy through re-election as an INC MLA. He failed in the by-election. In an interview to the Press ABN Andhra Jyothi he said that he is a great follower of P. Janardhan Reddy, he and his wife worship him every day and he admires him a lot.

After delimitation of constituencies, Nagender contested and won from Khairathabad Assembly Constituency in 2009 elections.

Nagender was inducted into the cabinet for the first time by YSR in 2009 and held the portfolio of Health and Medical Services, Labour, Employment, Training & Factories, and Industrial Training Institutes continued in the same portfolio in the cabinet of Konijeti Rosaiah. Nagender lost in the 2014 elections to BJP candidate Chintala Ramachandra Reddy and later joined BRS party in 2018 and won as MLA in 2018 and 2023.

Danam Nagender left Bharat Rashtra Samiti (BRS) on 17 March 2024 and joined the Congress party in the presence of AICC in-charge for Telangana Deepadas Munsi and Telangana Chief Minister A Revanth Reddy in Hyderabad ahead of 2024 Loksabha Elections.
