= Chintala Ramachandra Reddy =

Indian politician

C. Ramachandra Reddy

Member of Telangana Legislative Assembly
- In office 2014-2018
- Preceded by: Danam Nagender
- Succeeded by: Danam Nagender
- Constituency: Khairatabad

Personal details
- Born: Yellareddyguda, Hyderabad
- Party: Bhartiya Janata Party
- Occupation: Politician

C. Ramachandra Reddy (10 June 1952) is a politician from Bharatiya Janata Party in Telangana and he represented Khairatabad Assembly constituency.

== Political career ==
At the age of 12 years, Reddy joined the RSS and has been an active member since then. He served as chief of Greater Hyderabad BJP and unsuccessfully contested from Khairatabad in 2009 Assembly elections.

In 2014 Telangana Assembly election he won as MLA for first time from Khairatabad Assembly constituency by defeating Ex-Minister Danam Nagender of Indian National Congress.
