= Janardan Singh =

Janardan Singh may refer to:

- Janardan Singh Sigriwal, Indian politician
- Janardan Singh Gehlot, Indian sports administrator
