= Maganti Gopinath =

Indian politician (1963–2025)

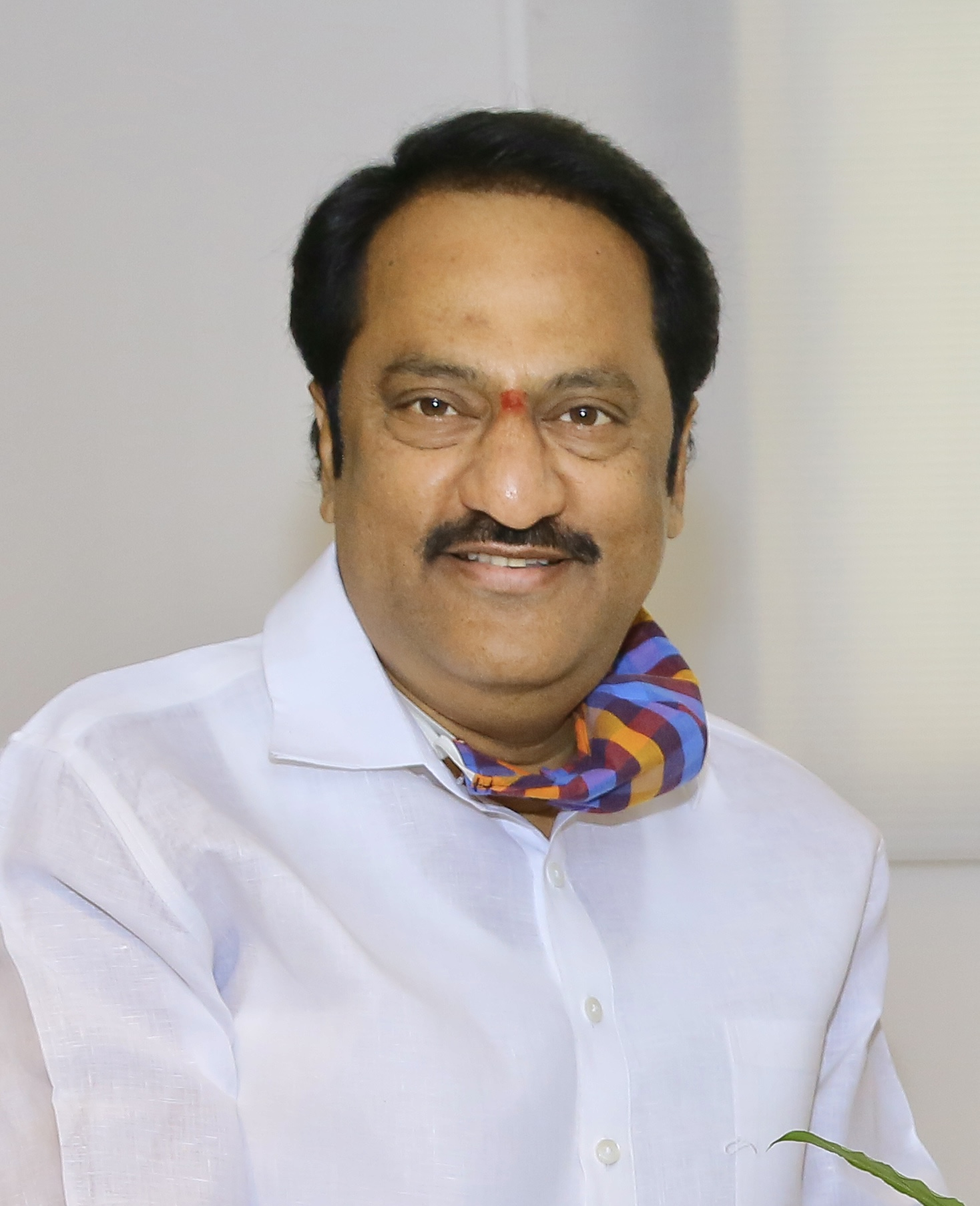
- Gopinath in 2022

Member of the Telangana Legislative Assembly for Jubilee Hills
- In office 2014–2025
- Preceded by: P. Vishnuvardhan Reddy
- Succeeded by: Naveen Yadav

Personal details
- Born: 2 June 1963 Hyderguda, Hyderabad, Andhra Pradesh, India
- Died: 8 June 2025 (aged 62) Hyderabad, Telangana, India
- Party: Bharat Rashtra Samithi
- Other political affiliations: Telugu Desam Party

Maganti Gopinath (2 June 1963 – 8 June 2025) was an Indian politician from the state of Telangana. He was a three-time member of the Legislative Assembly (MLA) from Jubilee Hills Assembly constituency in Hyderabad district. He won the 2023 Telangana Legislative Assembly election representing Bharat Rashtra Samithi.

== Early life and education ==
Gopinath was born in Hyderguda, Hyderabad on 2 June 1963 to Krishnamurthy and Mahanand Kumari. He passed intermediate from Venkateswara tutorials and completed his graduation from a college affiliated with Osmania University. He married Sunitha (2nd Wife) and they had three children, a son M. Vatsalyanath and two daughters, Akshara Nag and Dissira.

== Career ==
Gopinath started his political journey with the Telugu Desam Party in its initial years in 1983 as a student and an admirer of former chief minister N. T. Rama Rao. From 1985 to 1992, he was the president of Telugu Yuvatha, the youth wing of the TDP. He also served as director of the Hyderabad Urban Development Authority from 1987 to 1989. Then, he was a member of the District Consumer Forum from 1989 to 1993. In 2018, he served as a member of the Public Estimates Committee.

He was elected as an MLA for the first time in 2014. Representing the Telugu Desam Party, he was elected in the 2014 Andhra Pradesh Legislative Assembly election in the Jubilee Hills Assembly constituency. He polled 50,898 votes and defeated his nearest rival, V. Naveen Yadav of AIMIM by a margin of 9,242 votes. Later, he shifted to Telangana Rashtra Samithi, and won the Jubilee Hills seat in the 2018 Telangana Legislative Assembly election defeating P. Vishnuvardhan Reddy of the Indian National Congress by a margin of 16,004 votes.

He became an MLA for the third time winning the Jubilee Hills seat in the 2023 Telangana Legislative Assembly election. He polled 80,549 votes and defeated his nearest rival and former Indian cricket captain Mohammed Azharuddin of the Indian National Congress, by a margin of 16,337 votes.

== Death ==
Gopinath died of heart attack in a Hyderabad hospital, on the morning of 8 June 2025, six days after his 62nd birthday. He was admitted to a private hospital on 5 June. Gopinath also suffered from a kidney-related illness and underwent a surgery two months before his death.
