= Khairatabad Assembly constituency =

Constituency of the Telangana legislative assembly in India

Coordinates: 17.41°N 78.46°E

Khairatabad
- Constituency No. 60 for the Telangana Legislative Assembly
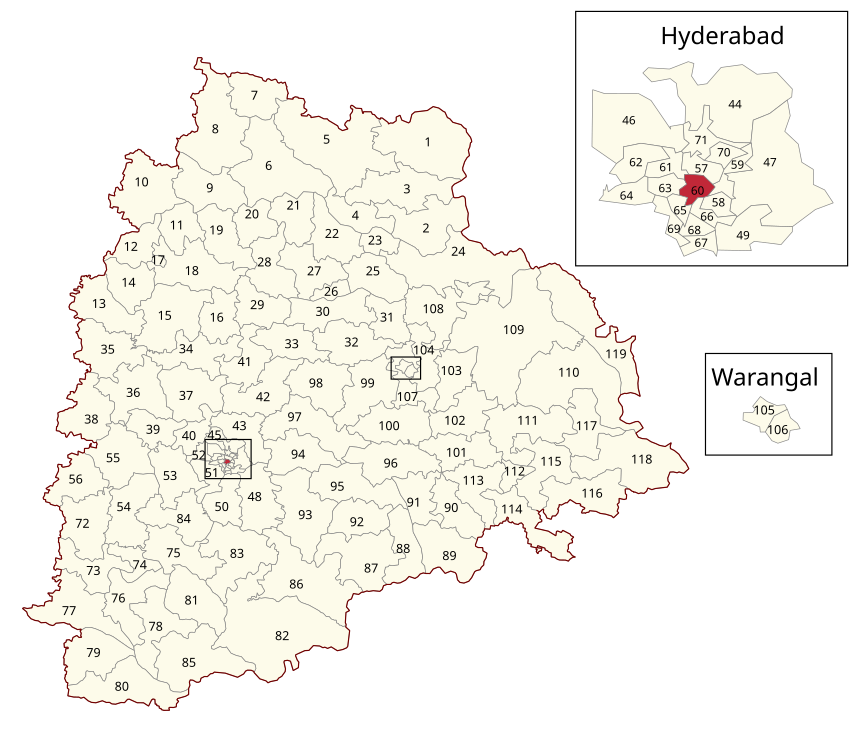
- Location of Khairatabad Assembly constituency within Telangana

Constituency details
- Country: India
- Region: South India
- State: Telangana
- District: Hyderabad
- Lok Sabha constituency: Secunderabad
- Established: 1967
- Total electors: 2,68,679
- Reservation: None

Member of Legislative Assembly
- 3rd Telangana Legislative Assembly
- Incumbent vacant

Khairatabad Assembly constituency is a constituency of Telangana Legislative Assembly, India. It is one of the 26 constituencies of CURE limits, a strategic zone created by Government of Telangana. It is part of Secunderabad Lok Sabha constituency.

Danam Nagender of Bharath Rashtra Samithi won from the Khairatabad constituency in 2023 Assembly Elections.

== Extent of the constituency ==
The assembly constituency presently comprises the following neighbourhoods:

Neighbourhood
Khairatabad
Narayanguda
Hyderguda
Himayatnagar
Lakdi ka pul
Somajiguda
Punjagutta
Raj Bhavan Road
Banjara Hills
Jubilee Hills
Basheerbagh (part)
King Koti (part)
Chintal Basti (part)

== Members of Legislative Assembly ==
Members of Legislative State Assembly, who represented Khairatabad in 2018.

Year	Member	Party
United Andhra Pradesh
1967	B. V. Gurumurthy	Indian National Congress
1972	Nagam Krishna Rao	Indian National Congress
1978	P. Janardhan Reddy	Indian National Congress (I)
1983	M. Ramchander Rao	Telugu Desam Party
1985	P. Janardhan Reddy	Indian National Congress
1989	P. Janardhan Reddy	Indian National Congress
1994	P. Janardhan Reddy	Indian National Congress
1999	K. Vijayarama Rao	Telugu Desam Party
2004	P. Janardhan Reddy	Indian National Congress
2008 (Note: By-Election)	P. Vishnuvardhan Reddy	Indian National Congress
2009	Danam Nagender	Indian National Congress
Telangana
2014	C. Ramachandra Reddy	Bharatiya Janata Party
2018	Danam Nagender	Telangana Rashtra Samithi
2023 (Note: MLA disqualified by Telangana High Court on 18 September 2026.)	Danam Nagender	Bharat Rashtra Samithi
2026		

== Election results ==
Vote share of Winning candidates
2023	43.48%
2018	44.56%
2014	36.91%
2009	39.05%
2008^	66.99%
2004	53.41%
1999	49.97%
1994	48.63%
1989	54.46%
1985	48.31%
1983	41.57%
1978	41.06%
1972	53.40%
1967	62.11%

=== 2023 ===
2023 Telangana Legislative Assembly election: Khairatabad
Party	Candidate	Votes	%	±%
BRS	Danam Nagender	67,368	43.48	▼1.08
INC	P. Vijaya Reddy	45,358	29.28	▲5.57
BJP	Chintala Ramachandra Reddy	38,094	24.59	▲0.09
NOTA	None of the Above	1,194	0.77	▼0.20
Majority		22,010	14.20	▼5.86
Turnout		154,924	52.33	▼1.41
BRS hold		Swing		

=== 2018 ===
2018 Telangana Legislative Assembly election: Khairatabad
Party	Candidate	Votes	%	±%
TRS	Danam Nagender	63,068	44.56	▲30.82
BJP	Chintala Ramachandra Reddy	34,666	24.50	▼12.41
INC	Dasoju Sravan Kumar	33,549	23.71	▲1.29
BSP	Manne Goverdhan Reddy	4,287	3.03	
NOTA	None of the Above	1,371	0.97	▼0.06
Majority		28,402	20.06	▲5.57
Turnout		141,521	53.74	▲0.20
TRS gain from BJP		Swing		

=== 2014 ===
2014 Telangana Legislative Assembly election: Khairatabad
Party	Candidate	Votes	%	±%
BJP	Chintala Ramachandra Reddy	53,102	36.91	
INC	Danam Nagender	32,256	22.42	
YSRCP	P. Vijaya Reddy	23,845	16.57	
TRS	Manne Govardhan Reddy	19,768	13.74	
STS	Narsing Rao Gonti	6,025	4.19	
LSP	Durga Ramachandra Rao	2,887	2.01	
NOTA	None of the Above	1,482	1.03	
Majority		20,846	14.49	
Turnout		143,865	53.54	
BJP gain from INC		Swing		

=== 2009 ===
2009 Andhra Pradesh Legislative Assembly election: Khairatabad
Party	Candidate	Votes	%	±%
INC	Danam Nagender	50,655	39.05	
TDP	K. Vijaya Rama Rao	36,797	28.37	
BJP	Chintala Rama Chandra Reddy	16,062	12.38	
LSP	Atluri Subhashini	12,191	9.40	
PRP	Navvada Vijayendra	10,808	8.33	
Majority		13,858	10.68	
Turnout		129,704	56.61	
INC gain from TDP		Swing		

=== 2008 by-election ===
By-election was held to fill the vacancy caused by the death of Shri P. Janardhana Reddy.

2008 Andhra Pradesh Legislative Assembly by-elections: Khairatabad
Party	Candidate	Votes	%	±%
INC	P. Vishnuvardhan Reddy	254,676	66.99	
LSP	K. Srinivasa Rao	58,407	15.36	
TRS	Mohd. Khaja Arifuddin	54,134	14.24	
CPI(M)	D. Sarala Devi	4,253	1.11	
Majority		196,269	51.63	
Turnout		380,145	36.21	
INC hold		Swing		

=== 2004 ===
2004 Andhra Pradesh Legislative Assembly election: Khairatabad
Party	Candidate	Votes	%	±%
INC	P. Janardhana Reddy	210,325	53.41	
TDP	K. Vijaya Rama Rao	171,226	43.48	
Majority		39,099	9.93	
Turnout		393,769		
INC gain from TDP		Swing		

=== 1999 ===
1999 Andhra Pradesh Legislative Assembly election: Khairatabad
Party	Candidate	Votes	%	±%
TDP	K. Vijaya Rama Rao	159,018	49.97	
INC	P. Janardhana Reddy	148,641	46.71	
BSP	Smt. Rockline	3,788	1.19	
Majority		10,377	3.26	
Turnout		318,233	53.65	
TDP gain from INC		Swing		

=== 1994 ===
1994 Andhra Pradesh Legislative Assembly election: Khairatabad
Party	Candidate	Votes	%	±%
INC	P. Janardhana Reddy	99,695	48.63	
TDP	B. Vijaya Kumar	69,682	33.99	
BJP	Chintala Ramchandra Reddy	27,662	13.49	
AIMIM	Mohd. Jahangir Ali	4,772	2.33	
Majority		30,013	14.64	
Turnout		205,003	55.04	
INC hold		Swing		

=== 1989 ===
1989 Andhra Pradesh Legislative Assembly election: Khairatabad
Party	Candidate	Votes	%	±%
INC	P. Janardhana Reddy	87,578	54.46	
TDP	M. Narayana Swamy	48,891	30.41	
IND	Mohd. Kasim	22,321	13.88	
Majority		38,687	24.05	
Turnout		160,798	56.38	
INC hold		Swing		

=== 1985 ===
1985 Andhra Pradesh Legislative Assembly election: Khairatabad
Party	Candidate	Votes	%	±%
INC	P. Janardhan Reddy	46,172	48.31	
TDP	N. Mohan Reddy	40,327	42.19	
IND	Mohd. Yousuf Ilyas	7,089	7.42	
Majority		5,845	6.12	
Turnout		95,583	53.67	
INC gain from Independent		Swing		

=== 1983 ===
1983 Andhra Pradesh Legislative Assembly election: Khairatabad
Party	Candidate	Votes	%	±%
IND	M. Ramchander Rao	36,188	41.57	
INC	Janardhan Reddy	23,476	26.97	
BJP	C. H. Hanumanth Rao	16,367	18.80	
IND	Mohd. Abdul Rashid	9,086	10.44	
Majority		12,712	14.60	
Turnout		87,043	57.05	
Independent gain from INC(I)		Swing		

=== 1978 ===
1978 Andhra Pradesh Legislative Assembly election: Khairatabad
Party	Candidate	Votes	%	±%
INC(I)	Janardhan Reddy	24,462	41.06	
JP	Narender Ale	23,808	39.96	
INC	M. R. Sham Rao	9,084	15.25	
IND	Aga Khan	1,239	2.08	
IND	Md. Kasim Ali Khan	985	1.65	
Majority		654	1.10	
Turnout		59,578	63.35	
INC(I) gain from INC		Swing		

=== 1972 ===
1972 Andhra Pradesh Legislative Assembly election: Khairatabad
Party	Candidate	Votes	%	±%
INC	Nagam Krishna Rao	18,392	53.40	
STS	E. V. Padmanabhan	10,970	31.85	
CPI	P. Nageswar Rao	3,260	9.47	
IND	Aftab Ahmed	777	2.26	
Majority		7,422	21.55	
Turnout		34,442	45.49	
INC hold		Swing		

=== 1967 ===
1967 Andhra Pradesh Legislative Assembly election: Khairatabad
Party	Candidate	Votes	%	±%
INC	B. V. Gurumurthy	22,576	62.11	
IND	S. Shankeriah	7,037	19.36	
ABJS	A. P. Vardihani	6,235	17.15	
IND	T. R. Rao	501	1.38	
Majority		15,539	42.75	
Turnout		36,349	56.60	
INC win (new seat)				

== Trivia ==
- Before Delimitation of Constituencies it is the constituency with largest voter base in the State.

== See also ==
- Khairatabad
- List of constituencies of Telangana Legislative Assembly
