= Janardhanan =

Janardhanan or Janardanan may refer to:

- Janardhanan (actor) (born 1946), Indian Malayalam film actor
- Janardhanan Ramdas (born 1970), Indian cricketer
- Karamana Janardanan Nair (1936–2000), Indian Malayalam film actor
- Kudamaloor Janardanan, Indian flautist of the Carnatic music tradition
- Ganesh Janardhanan (stage name VTV Ganesh), Indian Tamil film actor and producer
- Babu Janardhanan, Indian Malayalam screenwriter and film director

== See also ==
- Janardhan (disambiguation)
- John Jaffer Janardhanan, a 1982 Malayalam film
