= Janardhan Reddy =

Janardhan Reddy may refer to:

- Gali Janardhan Reddy, Karnataka legislator and minister
- Nagam Janardhan Reddy, legislator from Andhra Pradesh
- Nedurumalli Janardhana Reddy, former Chief Minister and MP from Andhra Pradesh
- P. Janardhan Reddy, former legislator from Andhra Pradesh
