= P. Vishnuvardhan Reddy =

Indian politician

Pabbathi Vishnu Vardhan Reddy
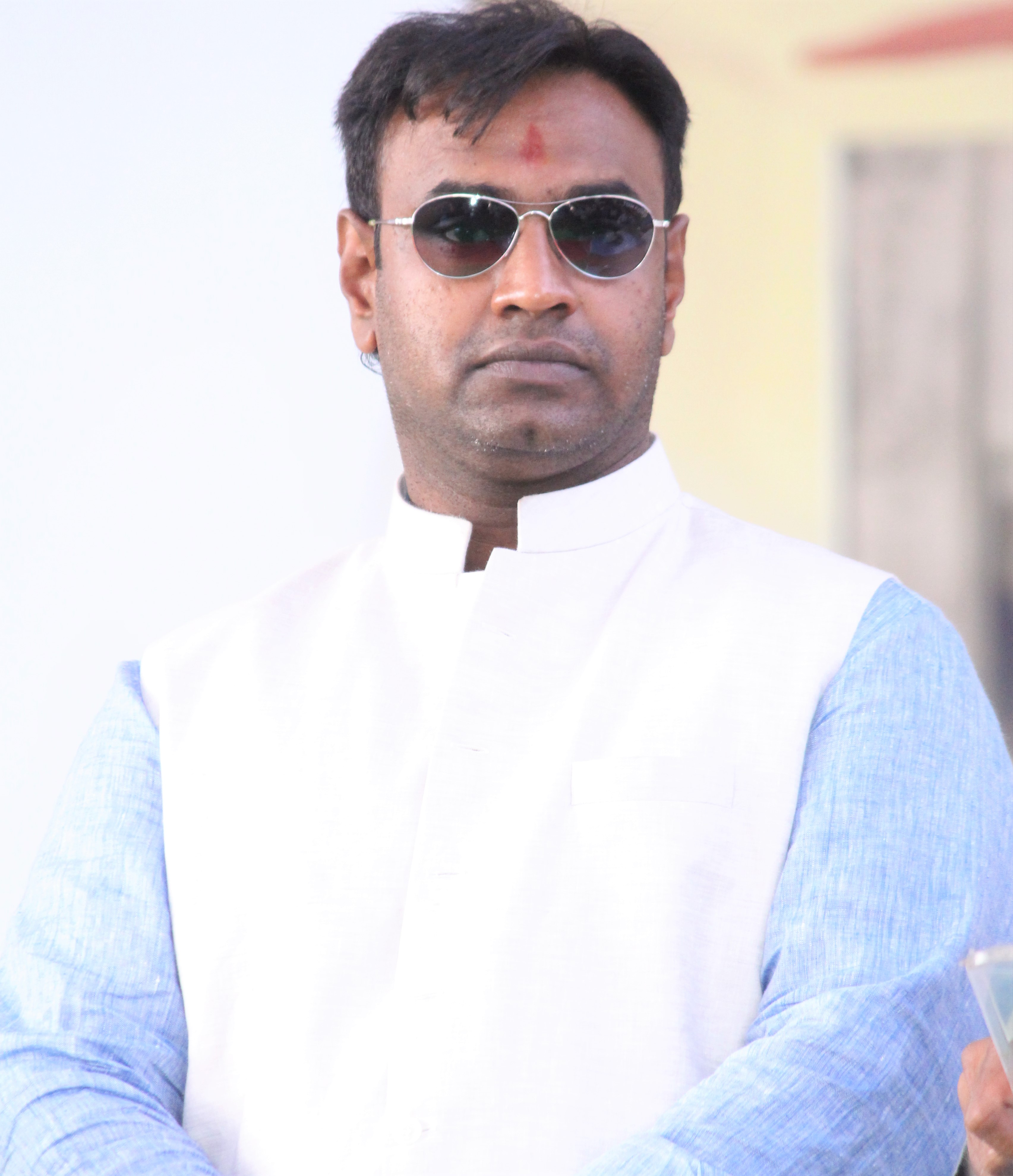
- Pabbathi Vishnu Vardhan Reddy

Member of the Andhra Pradesh Legislative Assembly
- In office 2009–2014
- Succeeded by: Maganti Gopinath
- Constituency: Jubilee Hills
- In office 2008–2009
- Preceded by: P. Janardhan Reddy
- Succeeded by: Danam Nagender
- Constituency: Khairatabad

Personal details
- Born: 8 February 1981 (age 45) Hyderabad, India
- Party: Bharat Rashtra Samithi
- Spouse: Lakshmi Sruthi Reddy
- Children: Two
- Parent: P. Janardhan Reddy (father)

Pabbathi Vishnu Vardhan Reddy (born 8 February 1981) is a former Member of Legislative Assembly (M.L.A.) in which he represented the Jubilee Hills constituency, of Telangana. He was born in Hyderabad, India to former Indian National Congress party CLP leader, Ex minister, MLA, P. Janardhan Reddy and Sulochana. His first election was followed by the death of his father from Khairatabad constituency before delimitation. He won with a majority of 2,80,236 votes, and in 2009 he has since been re-elected for the newly formed constituency of Jubilee Hills. He also served as NSUI national treasurer.

He lost election in 2018 with many less votes.

On October 31, 2023, he switched to BRS party led by KCR

== Controversies ==
In July 2007, Vishnuvardhan Reddy was arrested and sent to the Chanchalguda Central Jail, as a part of clashes between him and then Chief Minister Y. S. Rajasekhara Reddy's kin, and was released later.
