= Naveen Yadav =

Indian politician

- MLA Naveen Yadav

Member of the Telangana Legislative Assembly for Jubilee Hills
- Incumbent
- Assumed office 14 November 2025
- Preceded by: Maganti Gopinath

Personal details
- Born: 17 November 1983 (age 42) Yousufguda, Hyderabad, Telangana, India
- Party: Indian National Congress (2025-present)
- Other political affiliations: All India Majlis-e-Ittehadul Muslimeen (2014-2019)
- Spouse: Varsha Yadav
- Children: Ansh Yadav
- Parent(s): Chinna Srisailam Yadav, Kasthuri

Vallala Naveen Yadav (17 November 1983) is an Indian politician from Telangana state. He won the 2025 By Poll held for Jubilee Hills as Indian National Congress candidate. He won the election with a majority of 24,729 votes.

== Political career ==
Naveen Yadav started his political journey with All India Majlis-e-Ittehadul Muslimeen, he first contested in 2009 GHMC Elections from Yousufguda division and lost to TDP candidate Murali Goud. In 2014 he contested as AIMIM candidate from Jubilee Hills Assembly constituency and lost to his nearest rival Telugu Desam Party candidate Maganti Gopinath by a margin of 9,242 votes by securing 41,656 votes (25.19%) and finishing second.

Naveen Yadav contested 2016 GHMC Elections from Rahmathnagar division and lost to TRS candidate Mohammed Abdul Shafi. In 2018 he contested as Independent candidate from Jubilee Hills Assembly constituency and ends in third place with 18,817 votes. He Joined Congress party in the presence of then TPCC president A. Revanth Reddy on 15 November 2023.

Naveen Yadav contested 2025 By Poll held for Jubilee Hills which was necessitated following the death of sitting MLA Maganti Gopinath. He won with a huge majority of 24,729 votes by defeating his nearest rival BRS candidate Maganti Sunitha. Naveen Yadav finishes with 98,988 votes, Sunitha finished second with 74,259 votes and BJP’s Lankala Deepak Reddy ends in third place with 17,061 votes.
