= Vinayak Janardan Karandikar =

Indian Marathi poet

Vinayak Janardan Karandikar (15 September 1872 – 30 March 1909) was a major poet of the Marathi language of India. He is considered part of the early twentieth century renaissance in literature and poetry of the Marathi Language in the Indian state of Maharashtra due to his contribution to the revival of ancient poetry forms from Yadava Dynasty Maharashtra.
