= Venkatesh Kumar =

M. Venkatesh Kumar
- Venkatesh kumar in 2026
- Born: July 1, 1953 (age 73)
- Occupation: singer
- Years active: 1970–present
- Awards: Padma Shri (2016); Sangeet Natak Akademi Award (2012); Karnataka Rajyotsava Award (1999); Karnataka Sangeet Natya Academy Award (2007); Vatsala Bhimsen Joshi Award (2008); Krishna Hangal Award (2009); Kalidas Samman by Madhya Pradesh government. (for the year 2017, Awarded in 2021).; Alva's Virasat Award 2024
- Musical career
- Origin: Bellary, Karnataka, India
- Genres: Hindustani classical music, Dasara Pada, devotional songs

Pandit M. Venkatesh Kumar (born July 1, 1953) is an Indian Hindustani vocalist. He is best known for his classical raga performances as well as the rendition of devotional songs composed by Swami Haridas and Kanakadasa. Kumar belongs to the Panchakshara, Kirana and Gwalior Gharanas.

== Early life and musical training ==
Kumar was born in Lakshmipura in the Bellary region of northern Karnataka. Kumar's late father Huleppa was a Janapada folk singer and leather puppeteer. In 1968, when he was 15 years old, Venkatesh was taken by his mothers brother, father in law Nadoja Belagallu Veeranna to the Veereshwara Punyashrama in Gadag, run by the Veerashaiva saint and Hindustani musician Puttaraj Gawai. For the next 12 years, he lived at the ashram and learned Hindustani singing in the Gwalior and Kirana styles under Gawai. Kumar blends these styles in his presentations, though he admits to influences beyond these gharanas, chief among them being Bade Ghulam Ali Khan of the Patiala gharana. His guru was also trained in Carnatic music, and as a result, there are traces of Carnatic elements in Pandit Kumar's music, especially in his sargam patterns.

== Career ==
Kumar got his first break in 1993, 14 years after he left the ashram, when he received an invitation from Bhimsen Joshi to perform at the Sawai Gandharva Sangeet Mahotsav in Pune. However, he had to wait almost ten more years before he became a regular on the national festival circuit. Since then, he has been featured in many national musical programs, and has been an "A top" grade artist of All India Radio since 1988. His career has taken post his retirement from Karnataka University, Dharwad and he is widely recognized as the pre-eminent Hindustani classical singer of his generation. A Scroll article describes him as a rock-star among Hindustani classical performers. The article says he is widely respected by fellow musicians and is equally loved by his peers and audiences alike for his simple and humble personality.

In devotional music, Kumar is most acclaimed for his Kannada vachana and dasara pada singing. He has recorded multiple devotional and classical CD albums.

== Musical style ==
While being influenced by Kirana and Gwalior gharanas of Hindustani music, Venkatesh Kumar has developed a unique style of his own that are not found in any other gharana or in other performers. For example, in live performance, he prefers to sing relatively short main pieces, often finishing in 35 minutes, where other artistes may use an entire hour. His choice of lyrics for the bandish in standard ragas is a mix of traditional and well-known compositions, and his repertoire includes several alternate lyrics in the same raga. Some signature technical aspects of his performance that are unique are his use of staccato triplets, and oscillatory movements between two notes. He is also known for his surprise use of innovative musical phrases that are not often heard in a raag. For example, he often sweeps chromatically through contiguous notes together, which may be rarely heard in a raag (say a contiguous sweep from the Pancham (fifth) note to the Gandhar (third) note in Raag Bihag. He also has extremely fine command over laya (rhythm) and uses tihais (triple phrases) frequently; however, the tihais are occasionally sung to be deliberately and subtly asymmetrical. He is known for his powerful voice, and his style of reaching the sam of the antara with a long, sustained note – the tonic of the upper register.

He has a wide repertoire of ragas including Bihag, Maru Bihag, Shuddha Kalyan, Bhairav, Bhimpalas, Multani, Jog, Durga, Brindavani Sarang, Malkauns, Darbari and others.

== Teaching ==
Kumar began his teaching career at Vijay Mahantesh Arts College near Gadag, where he taught for one-and-a-half years. He has also taught in Mukunda Kripa in Udupi.

He received a postgraduate degree in music from Gandharva Mahavidyalaya. He authored the textbook of music prescribed for the examination conducted by the government of Karnataka.

Kumar taught at the University College of Music, Dharwad, for 33 years. This commitment regularly required him to turn down concerts, but he refused to quit the job that offered him stability at a time when concerts were hard to come by. He retired in 2015.

== Awards ==
Kumar has received awards and titles including:

- Karnataka Rajyotsava Award (1999)
- Karnataka Sangeet Natya Academy Award (2007)
- Vatsala Bhimsen Joshi Award (2008)
- Krishna Hangal Award (2009)
- Sangeet Natak Akademi Award (2012)
- Honorary Doctorate from Karnataka University, Dharwad (2014)
- Padma Shri Award by the Government of India (2016)
- Gangubai Hangal National Award (2017)
- Kalidas Samman by Madhya Pradesh government. (for the year 2017. Awarded in 2021).
- Honorary Doctorate from Sri Sathya Sai University For Human Excellence, Muddenahalli (2022).
