= Hyderguda =

- Inner City
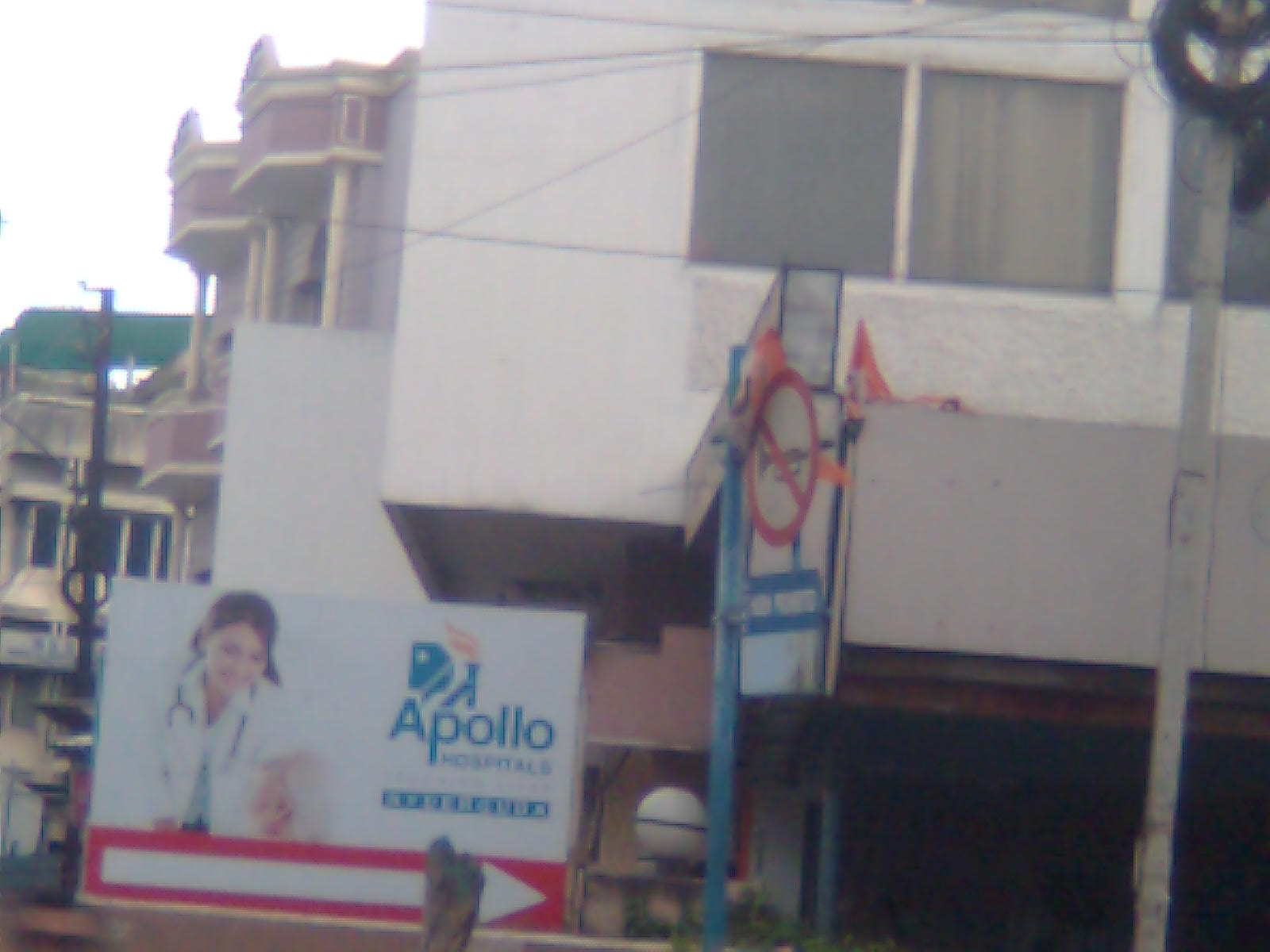
- Apollo Hospital at Hyderguda, Hyderabad.

- Location in Hyderabad, India Hyderguda (India)
- Coordinates: 17°23′47″N 78°28′54″E
- Country: India
- State: Telangana
- District: Hyderabad
- Metro: Hyderabad

Government
  - Body: GHMC

Languages
  - Official: Telugu and Urdu
- Time zone: UTC+5:30 (IST)
- PIN: 500 029
- Vehicle registration: TG
- Lok Sabha constituency: Hyderabad
- Vidhan Sabha constituency: Khairatabad
- Planning agency: GHMC
- Website: telangana.gov.in

Hyderguda is a major locality in Hyderabad, Telangana, India. It is one of the costliest areas of Hyderabad with high real estate cost both for commercial and residential properties.

The old MLA residential quarters are situated here.

== Etymology ==
This was the area where a revenue collector named Hyder Ali used to reside. He was the person who collected property from Waheedunnisa Begum, the sister of the 3rd Nizam of Hyderabad, Sikander Jah.

== Commercial area ==
Hyderguda has many malls and shopping areas, including Food World, Pantaloons, More, etc. One of the biggest ICICI Bank branches, and a branch of Corporation Bank are located in Hyderguda.

Bharatiya Vidya Bhavan has a branch here and St Joseph's Degree and PG College and St Paul's High School, Hyderabad are located close to this Bhavan. Lotus National School is present here

Here Madina High School as well as Madina Students' Hostel were very popular in mid-1990s. Now the latter has been converted to Madina Eye Hospital.

== Transport ==
TSRTC runs the buses connecting Hyderguda to many prominent places such as Osmania University, Nampally, Kachiguda, etc.

The closest MMTS Train station is at Nampally.
