= Jubilee Hills Assembly constituency =

Constituency of the Telangana legislative assembly in India

Coordinates: 17.43°N 78.41°E

Jubilee Hills
- Constituency No. 61 for the Telangana Legislative Assembly
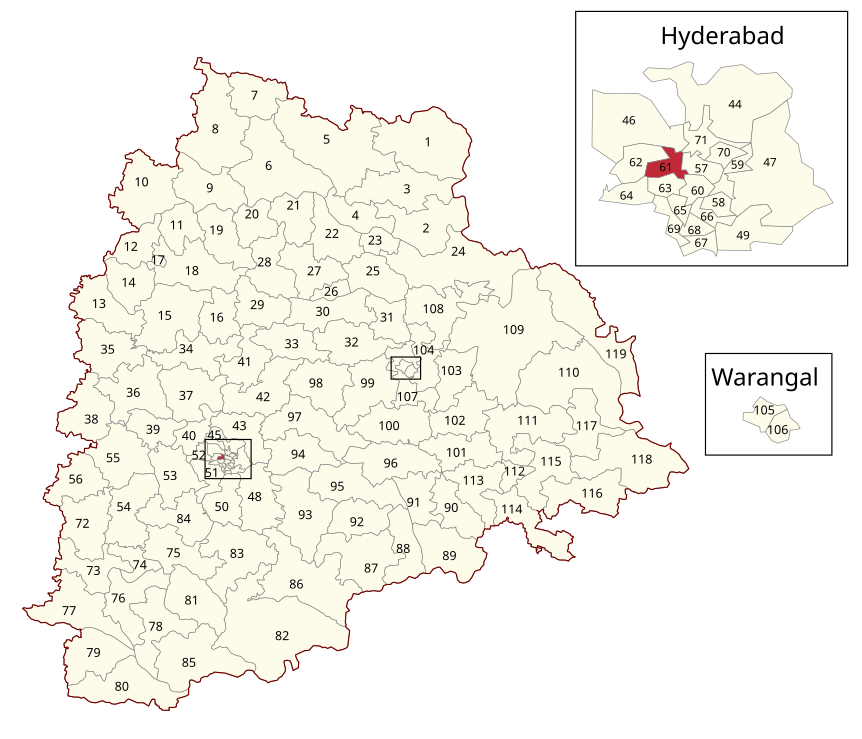
- Location of Jubilee Hills Assembly constituency within Telangana

Constituency details
- Country: India
- Region: South India
- State: Telangana
- District: Hyderabad
- Lok Sabha constituency: Secunderabad
- Established: 2008
- Total electors: 3,90,877
- Reservation: None

Member of Legislative Assembly
- 3rd Telangana Legislative Assembly
- Incumbent Naveen Yadav
- Party: Indian National Congress
- Elected year: 2025

Jubilee Hills Assembly constituency is a constituency of Telangana Legislative Assembly, India. It is one of the 26 constituencies of CURE limits, a strategic zone created by Government of Telangana. It is part of Secunderabad Lok Sabha constituency.

== Extent of the constituency ==
The Assembly Constituency presently comprises the following neighbourhoods:

Neighbourhood
Erragadda
Borabanda
Yousufguda
Vengal rao Nagar
Rahamat Nagar
Shaikpet

== Members of Legislative Assembly ==
Year	Member	Political party
United Andhra Pradesh
2009	P. Vishnuvardhan Reddy	Indian National Congress
Telangana
2014	Maganti Gopinath	Telugu Desam Party
2018	Maganti Gopinath	Telangana Rashtra Samithi
2023	Maganti Gopinath	Bharat Rashtra Samithi
2025^	Vallala Naveen Yadav	Indian National Congress

★ indicates a by-election

== Election results ==
=== 2025 ===
2025 Jubilee Hills By-Election
Party	Candidate	Votes	%	±%
INC	Naveen Yadav	98,988	50.83	▲15.80
BRS	Maganti Sunitha	74,259	38.13	▼5.81
BJP	Lankala Deepak Reddy	17,061	8.76	▼5.35
NOTA	None of the above	924	0.47	▼0.28
Majority		24,729	12.70	▲3.79
Turnout		1,94,727	48.49	▲0.91
INC gain from BRS		Swing		

=== 2023 ===
2023 Telangana Legislative Assembly election: Jubilee Hills
Party	Candidate	Votes	%	±%
BRS	Maganti Gopinath	80,549	43.94	▼0.36
INC	Mohammed Azharuddin	64,212	35.03	▲1.01
BJP	Lankala Deepak Reddy	25,866	14.11	
AIMIM	Mohammed Rashed Farazuddin	7,848	4.28	
NOTA	None of the above	1,374	0.75	
Majority		16,337	8.91	
Turnout		1,83,312	47.58	
Registered electors		3,85,287		
BRS hold		Swing		

=== 2018 ===
2018 Telangana Legislative Assembly election: Jubilee Hills
Party	Candidate	Votes	%	±%
TRS	Maganti Gopinath	68,979	44.30	▲33.15
INC	P. Vishnuvardhan Reddy	52,975	34.02	▲13.68
Independent	Naveen Yadav	18,817	12.09	
NOTA	None of the Above	1,547	0.99	
Majority		16,004	10.4	
Turnout		1,54,148	47.2	
TRS gain from TDP		Swing		

=== 2014 ===
2014 Andhra Pradesh Legislative Assembly election: Jubilee Hills
Party	Candidate	Votes	%	±%
TDP	Maganti Gopinath	50,898	30.78	
AIMIM	Naveen Yadav	41,656	25.19	
INC	P. Vishnuvardhan Reddy	33,642	20.34	
TRS	Bholasankari Ramulu Mudiraj	18,436	11.15	
Majority		9,242	5.59	
Turnout		1,65,368	56.85	
TDP gain from INC		Swing	5%	

=== 2009 ===
Andhra Pradesh Assembly Elections, 2009: Jubilee Hills (Assembly constituency)
Party	Candidate	Votes	%	±%
INC	P. Vishnuvardhan Reddy	54,519	39.84%	
TDP	Mohammed Saleem	32,778	23.95%	
PRP	Syed Humayun Ali	19,433	14.20%	

== See also ==
- List of constituencies of Telangana Legislative Assembly
