= Yellareddyguda =

Yellareddyguda, also known as Thallabai, is a suburb of Hyderabad located near Kapra. It is a developing area, where its surroundings are being developed and built. It has a population of over 10,000. It belongs to the ECIL zone followed by Kapra, Radhika, and Sainikpuri.

Yellareddyguda has been the location of several films, including the 1970s Bollywood film Ankur by Shyam Benegal and Daana Veera Soora Karna, which was shot near Kapra Lake.

Thallabai Village has been history for mainly Yadav's or so called Yadava's and secondarily Reddy's followed by Gouds. The Yadav's who lived here are land lords of acres of agricultural lands and they are named with surname Allam's or Allam's Yadav Kandhan who are known for well wishers and respected family in 19th century, Allam's generation still exists in village and family group consists of around 150 people.

== Localities ==
Apart from this, another locality also named as Yellareddyguda is located in Hyderabad which is near Ameerpet, Yousufguda.

== Transport ==
TSRTC connects Yellareddyguda to other parts of the city.
