= Janardan Singh Gehlot =

Indian sports administrator (died 2021)

Janardhan Singh Gelhot (5 October 1944 – 28 April 2021) was an Indian sports administrator. He was the founder president of the International Kabaddi Federation. He was president of Amateur Kabaddi Federation of India (AKFI) for 28 years. In May 2013, he was made life president of AKFI.

== Political career ==
He had won elections of MLA from karoli in 1980, 1990 and 1998. He defeated Bhairo singh shekhawat the vice president of India in 1980 from gandhi nagar constituency. He had been food and public supply minister in rajasthan. He was a close friend of Sanjay gandhi. He was a member of the Indian National Congress before leaving in 2008 and joining the Bharatiya Janata Party. The former BJP party leader rejoined Congress in 2019.

== Death ==
He died in Jaipur on 28 April 2021, after a prolonged illness.

== Awards ==
Big Star Most Entertaining Sportsperson A book was written on his life, Sangharsh se shikhar tak by Rajendra Boda.

== See also ==
Pro Kabaddi League
