= Kudamaloor Janardanan =

Indian musician

Kudamaloor Janardanan [കുടമാളൂര്‍ ജനാര്‍ദ്ദനന്‍] (born 21 July 1969) is an Indian flautist of the Carnatic music tradition.

== Early life and background ==
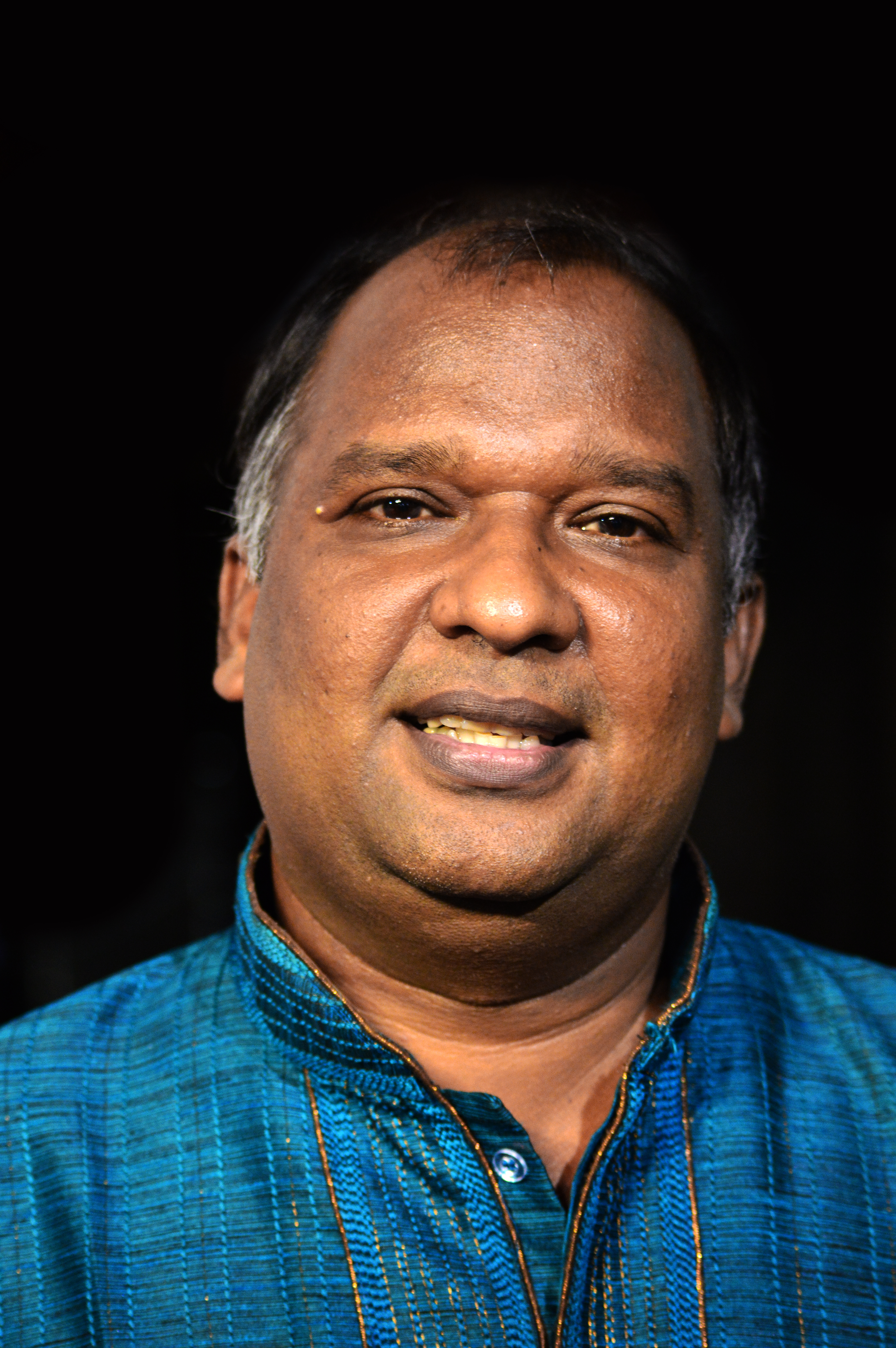
Kudamaloor Janardhanan

Kudamaloor Janardanan was born into a musical family in Kudamaloor, Kottayam district, Kerala, India. He had his basic vocal music lessons from his father, G. Krishna Iyer. Soon he was fascinated by the art of instrumental music and turned to the Indian flute. Kudamaloor Janardanan or Kudamaloorji as he is better known is a self-taught and learnt classical flautist. His journey began on a high note with a maiden performance at the age of 7, followed by prizes, medals and accomplishments in different school, college, university, district and state level competitions under different categories of Flute, Vocal and Violin. In his later years of student life, Janardanan was guided by his paternal uncle, K.Shivaramakrishna Iyer, a prominent flautist of his time. Janardanan was awarded the scholarship for further studies in music by the Department of Culture, Government of India. He went on to obtain a graduate degree in Violin from Madras University. An ‘A’ Grade artiste of the All India Radio and an empaneled musician of the ICCR, Kudamaloorji continues to maintain his distinct style.

== Musical career ==
Kudamaloorji's musical journey as a musician, music composer and a performer has gone beyond the traditional classical Carnatic music. Besides many solo albums, he has composed and orchestrated music for devotional albums, classical dances and background score for motion pictures. Apart from having many published works (See Discography), Kudamaloor Janardanan is also active in concert circuits in India and abroad. A great many performances in temples, cultural organisations across the country and internationally reputed venues in the UK, UAE, Belgium and the Netherlands, Kudamaloorji has also performed in the National Program of Music organised jointly by All India Radio and Doordarshan. Some of his Indian tours that got reviews in media are:

- Flute concert at seven-day annual festival of Sri Viswambhara Temple in Kottakal
- Flute concert at Vyloppilli Sanskriti Bhavan in Trivandrum, hosted by Alliance Francaise de Trivandrum
- Kovalam Lit Fest Day 2
- Theerthapada Mandapam, Thiruvananthapuram. The occasion was the Swati Sangeetotsav organised as part of the 60th anniversary celebrations of All India Radio.
- Shree Technologies: Transcendence, flute recital by Kudamaloor Janardanan and party, Bharatiya Vidya Bhavan, Race Course Road

Some of the concerts that Kudamaloor conducted aboard includes:

- 25 February 2010 – Tropentheater (Amsterdam)
- 26 February 2010 – Zuiderpershuis (Antwerp)
- 28 February 2010 – Muziekpodium Zeeland (Veere)
- 1 March 2010 – De Oosterpoort (Groningen)

== Music philosophy ==
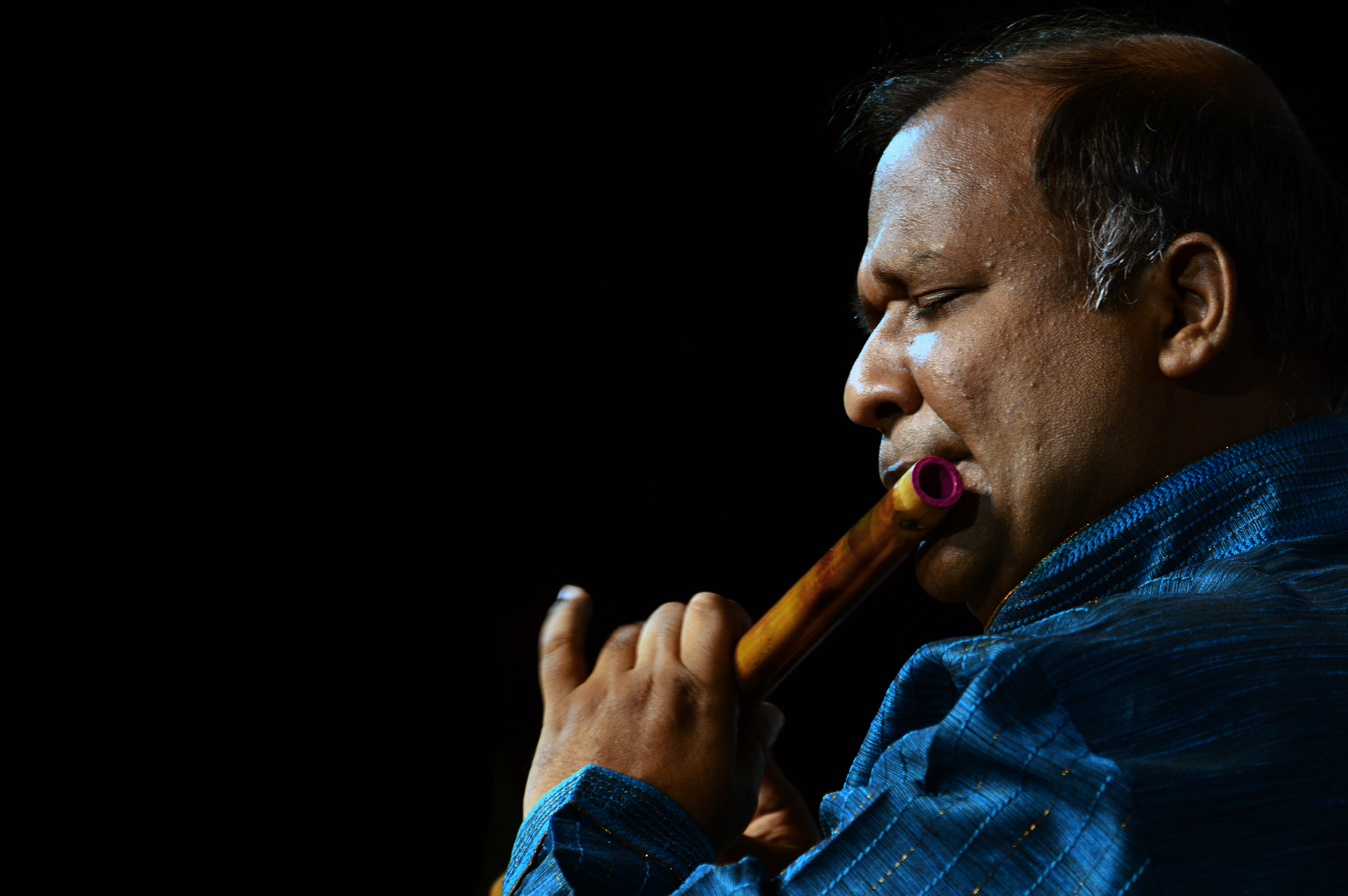

The key philosophy of Kudamaloor Janardhanan is Music is especially a rendition of ragas (or melody), instead of a vehicle of lyrics based songs (Kritis). Janardanan considers ragas as "the spirit of Indian classical music." According to a "The Hindu" Review "With flautist Kudamaloor Janardanan it seems to be something of a mission to give the ragas their right place in music concerts. That was clear as he played such superb ragas as Nattakurinji, Mohanam, Chenchurutti, Sarasangi, and Sankarabharanam. … ragas are supreme in instrumental music with the kritis playing a secondary role." The review continues to say "True to the flautist's unconventional style, there was a near total absence of kritis, varnams and tillanas in the concert, enabling the listeners to enjoy the ragas in their pure form."

On the over influence of Kritis on Cartnatic Music, Janardhanan says in an interview, "In Carnatic music, kirthans and bhaktigeetams have been given a great deal of prominence. This has resulted in the general impression that classical music means devotional music. Only when it is freed from such notions will classical music be able to spread its wings and be enjoyed by more people." He continues in the same interview, "If classical music were a tree, devotional music is only one of its branches. It must be realised that when the blue sky or moonlight is being expressed in a raag, that is also classical music. In 'Gita Govindam' where the theme is that of love between Radha and Krishna, it is the 'shringara bhava' that should be brought forth by the musician. But many artistes still keep projecting the bhakti bhava."

He also uses "unconventional" instrumentation in his concerts. In the Kovalam Lt Festival, he used Drums, Percussions, Keyboard and Voices in a Raga-based concert. He also uses Edakka (a south Indian, temple based drum) and Tabla (mostly used in Hindustani Music) apart from conventional Mridagam and Ghatam.

His overall approach of curiosity and experimentation in Music can be seen from this quote, "I am not one to shy away from creativity, sidelining it by saying that music is as eternal and vast as an ocean. If indeed that is the case, I would rather venture into its unexplored depths, to discover the coffer of pearls and gems. What has been made so far are indeed sweet. What we hear now may be sweeter; however the sweetest is yet to come. Won't we benefit much if we start thinking on these lines?"

== Discography ==
1. Madhava Murali (Released in 2005 by Manorama Music, Heritage Series) has 6 songs in 50 minutes rendered mainly in bamboo flute in Carnatic Music style. Sub title of the music is "Compositions on Lord Krishna in Flute". The main kriti is this disc is "Krupaya Palaya" Charukesi which lasts for 12 minutes. Other Kritis are Alai Payuthe, Rara venugopala, Krishna Ni Bhegane and Enna Thavam Kapi. Main flute is played by Kudamaloor Janardhanan. The accompanying artists on Mridangam, Veena, Ghatam and second flutes are not known.

2. Poomoodam Devi (Released in 2005 by Manorama Music) contains 11 devotional songs. This is a vocal work by K. S. Chitra, Radhika Thilak, Sujatha Mohan and Madhu Balakrishnan. Kudamloor Janardhanan plays Rara Venu Kriti in this work.

3. Mohana Murali (Released in 2006 by Manorama Music part of Heritage Series) has 4 songs in 58 minutes rendered mainly in bamboo flute in Carnatic Style. Subtitle of this album is “An Album based on sublime raga Mohanam". Main song is Mohana Layatharangam (Ecstasy And More) that lasts for 24 minutes. According to a review, "Mohana Laya Tarangam speaks to your soul with its remarkable blend of rhythm and melody. One perceives not only Mohanam, but four other ragas, owing to the unique technique applied here, called 'sruti bhedam". Other songs in this album are Reflections- The Image of Swaras, Mohana Varnam – Owen Version ( based on Nini Kori Varnam), and The Oarsmans Ode A Musical Ferry ( a folk tune)

4. Swathi Murali (Released in 2006 by Manorama Music as a part of Heritage Series) has 6 songs in 63 minutes rendered mainly in bamboo flute in Carnatic Style. The album is a flute rendition of some of the compositions of Swathi Thirunal. There are two main songs in this album, "Pahi Jagath Janani" that lasts for 16 minutes and Jaya Padmanabha which lasts for 12 minutes. Other kritis included are Gopalaka Pahiman Anisham, Parama Purusha, Tharuni Njana Enthu Cheyvu and Madhava.

5. Vathapi – Ganesha Murali (Released in 2007 by Manorama Music as a part of Heritage Series) has 3 songs in 58 minutes mainly rendered in Bamboo flute in Carnatic Style with chorus and voice support. The main kriti played in flute with an ensemble of Tabla, Mridangam, Veena, Chenda and Voice. Main song is Sree Vathapi Ganapthe which lasts for 28 minutes. Other kritis are Sidhi Vinayakam (subtitle: The Realization) and Mahaganapathim (subtitle: The eternal bliss).

6. Pranam (Released in 2007 by Manorama Music) has 5 songs in 59 minutes rendered mainly in bamboo flute played both in Carnatic Style and Hindustani Style. The subtitle of this album is "A South Indian Flautist pays homage to Hindustani Music Legend Ustad Bismillah Khan". In the introduction of this album, named "Homage to Bismillah Khan: Speech of Kudamaloor”, Kudmaloor Janardhanan describes this album as “an humble attempt to honor great Hindustani musician Ustad Bismillah Khan”. Kudmaloor remembers feeling like a “child seeing rainbow for the first time” whenever he listens to Ustad's Shehnai music. Pranam is the longest song in this album that lasts for 25 minutes. Other pieces are Kajri, Sree Ramachandra and Kajri (old style). Hari Krishnamoorthy plays Tabala.

7. Gokula Murali (Released in 2008 by Manorama Music as a part of Heritage Series) has 6 songs in 47 minutes mainly rendered in bamboo flute played in Carnatic Style. This album is a collection of songs devoted to Krishna. The kritis in this album are Sreeman Narayana, Swagatham Krishna, Govardhana Giridhara, Radhasametha Krishna, Manasa Sancharare and Theeratha Vilaiyattu Pillai. According to a review in The Hindu, "Kudamaloor Janardanan proves that in his hands the bamboo reed is transformed into a magical wand." Mridangam is played by Vypin Sathish, Tabla by Hari Krishnamoorthy, Edakka by Trichur Krishnakumar and Ghatam by Kottayam Unnikrishnan.

8. Atmayan : Journey of the Soul (Released by Krishnaprasad Musical in 2008) has 6 songs 39 minutes. This album is a collection of instrumental music created both in Indian and Western Styles. Kudamallor plays Atmayan and Ode to Krishna. This album also has work by U. Rajesh in Mandolin, Herald, Krishna Kumar and Sumesh Parameshwar.

9. Kudamaloor Janardhanan Live (Released in 2009 by Manorama Music) has 8 songs in 169 minutes rendered in bamboo flute in Carnatic Style. According to the introduction from this album, this is a recording of a live flute concert arranged by Manorama Music as a part of Music Fiesta 2008 program on 17 February 2008 at Women's Association Hall, Eranakulam, Kerala, India. Kudamaloor is accompanied by Hari Krishnamoorthy on Tabala, Kottayam Krishnan on Ghatam and Satish Vypin on Mridangam. The Main Kriti is Chaliye Kunchanamoo that lasts for 30 minutes. The Swara Pallavi, that lasts for 40 minutes is an ensemble of ragas ( Raga Maalika) of Kapi, Bihag, SinduBhairavi, Shahana and Madyamavathi with madhu raga of Kalyani. Other Kritis in this album are Baja Manasa, Sree Ramanavibho, Raminsuva, Raghuvamsasudha and Krishna Nee Begane. The concert end with Swara Manjari played in Western Style.

10. Vrindavanam (Released by Manorama Music in 2009) is a set of devotional Krishna songs by Swetha Mohan with 7 songs in 60 minutes. Concept and Music is provided by Kudmaloor Janardhanan. The songs in this album are Narayana, Bajare Yadunantham, Govardhana Gireesham, Maddugari Yesoda, Baja Baja Manasa, Chaliye and Mukundahtakam & Namasankeertanam.

11. Keerthana Murali (Released by Manorama Music in 2010) has 6 songs in 60 minutes played in bamboo flute in Carnatic Style. The subtitle of the album is “Popular Carnatic Krithis”. Vypin Satheesh accompanies the flute with Mridangam. The main song is Pakkala that lasts for 15 minutes. Other Kritis in this album are Raga Sudharasa, Thatwamaruka, Nee Dayaradha, Seetha Kalyana and Bhagyada Lakshmi

12. Maya Murali (Released by Manorama Music in May 2011) has 9 Songs in 66 minutes mainly rendered in bamboo flute in Carnatic Style. In terms of its length ( 15 minutes), Long Live Music is the main song in this album. The other songs are Maya Murali, A Hymn to the Goddess of Art (based on Vara Veena Mridupani), A Ballad of Victory, The Cradle Song (based on Omana Thingal Kidavo), The Inception, The Kannamma Song (based on Chinna Chiru Kuyile), To My Soul Mate and The Bamboo Express. The accompanying musicians are H Kishore, Harikrishna Moorthy and Vinod Chandra Menon. According to The Hindu Review “Maya Murali has nine pieces, innovative, traditional krithis, all of them punctuated by Kudmaloor’s inimitable style, fused together with an exciting backup of vocals and other instruments.”

13. Kaivalya – The Symphony of Meditation (Released by Invis and marketed by TravelKerala.Tv ) is an audio CD containing three songs in bamboo flute based on ragas Nalinakanthi and Saraswathi. According to the Editorial review in Amazon this album "charms the air through the swaras (musical notes) taking it to the innermost core of the soul and bringing tranquility to it.”

14. Keli – The Symphony of Love(Released by Invis Multimedia and marketed by TravelKerala.Tv ) is an audio CD containing songs played in bamboo flute and is about the intricacies of love. According to the Editorial Review in Amazon "Keli is a musical tribute to love – the most joyful, enchanting and universal aspect of human life.”

15. Viraha-The Symphony of Separation(Released by Invis Multimedia and marketed by TravelKerala.Tv ) is an audio CD containing songs played in bamboo flute and is about the pangs of separation. According to Amazon Editorial Review "Viraha, the sweet sorrow of separation immortalized in the love of Radha and Krishna is rendered poignantly on flute by Kudamaloor Janardanan.”

16. Gokulam (Released in 2011 by Ravishankar Gopalan) is a set of devotional songs on Lord Guruvayoorappa by Hema Ravishankar and G Venugopal. Kudamaloor Janardhanan provided the background score for this album

17. Ramanan is a musical based on Changampuzha's 'Ramanan'. The main character Ramanan's flute is played by Kudamaloor Janardhanan.

== Collaborators ==
These artists worked with Kudamloor in many of his albums and concerts

Vypin Satheesh: Mridangam S Kishore: Mridangam Balkrishna Kammathu: Mridangam Chandrakumar: Mridangam P. V. Anilkumar: Mridangam Harikrishna Moorthy : Tabala
