= P. Janardhan Reddy =

Indian politician

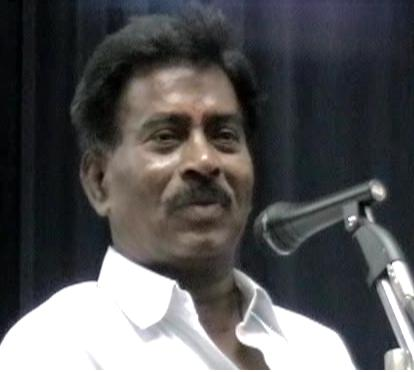

11th Leader of the opposition Andhra Pradesh Legislative Assembly
- In office 24 Mar1995 – 29 Oct 1999
- Governor: Shankar Dayal Sharma; Krishan Kant
- Chief Minister: N. T. Rama Rao; N. Chandrababu Naidu
- Preceded by: N. T. Rama Rao
- Succeeded by: Y. S. Rajasekhara Reddy
- Constituency: Khairatabadu

Member of the Andhra Pradesh Legislative Assembly for Khairatabadu
- In office 2004–2007
- Preceded by: K. Vijayarama Rao
- Succeeded by: P. Vishnuvardhan Reddy
- In office 1985–1999
- Preceded by: M. Ramchander Rao
- Succeeded by: K. Vijayarama Rao
- In office 1978–1983
- Preceded by: Nagam Krishna Rao
- Succeeded by: M. Ramchander Rao

Personal details
- Born: 12 January 1948 Hyderabad, Andhra Pradesh (now in Telangana, India)
- Died: 28 December 2007 (aged 59) Hyderabad, Andhra Pradesh
- Party: Indian National Congress
- Spouse: Paripati Sulochana
- Profession: Union leader

P. Janardhan Reddy (PJR) (12 January 1948 – 28 December 2007) was an Indian National Congress party leader and labour leader from Andhra Pradesh. He was elected and served as Member of the Legislative Assembly (MLA) five times for the Hyderabad constituency of Khairtabad until his death.

== Electoral History ==
Year	Constituency	House	Party	Votes	%	Opponent	Party	Votes	%	Result	Margin	%
1978	Khairatabad	Assembly	INC(I)	24,462	41.06	Ale Narendra	JP	23,808	39.96	Won	+654	+1.10
1983	Khairatabad	Assembly	INC(I)	23,476	26.97	M. Ramchander Rao	TDP	36,188	41.57	Lost	-12,712	-14.60
1985	Khairatabad	Assembly	INC	46,172	48.31	N. Mohan Reddy	TDP	40,327	42.19	Won	+5,845	+6.12
1989	Khairatabad	Assembly	INC	77,159	52.89	M. Narayana Swamy	TDP	62,354	42.74	Won	+14,805	+10.15
1994	Khairatabad	Assembly	INC	63,222	37.07	B. Vijaya Kumar	TDP	53,520	31.38	Won	+9,702	+5.69
1999	Khairatabad	Assembly	INC	1,22,238	44.82	K. Vijayarama Rao	TDP	1,32,615	48.62	Lost	-10,377	-3.80
2004	Khairatabad	Assembly	INC	2,10,325	52.27	K. Vijayarama Rao	TDP	1,71,226	42.55	Won	+39,099	+9.72

== Early life ==
P. Janardhan Reddy was born on 12 January 1948 to P. Papi Reddy and Shivamma in Domalguda, Hyderabad. He received a diploma in Electrical Engineering from a polytechnic college.

Reddy worked as a supervisor in the AP Electrical Equipment Corporation in Sanathnagar, Hyderabad.

== Political career ==
Reddy started his career as a trade union leader in 1967. He represented many industrial trade unions before entering mainstream politics. He represented labour unions of Hyderabad Alwin, Kesavram Cements, NTPC and Vizag Steel factory. He was also the President for Associated Glass Industries Workers Union, A.P. Electrical Equipment Corporation Employees Union, A.P. Agro Industries Employees Union and Krishi Engines.

Reddy was first elected to Andhra Pradesh assembly in 1978 and four more times (1985, 1989, 1994 and 2004) from Khairatabad constituency in Hyderabad, which is one of the most populous constituencies in the state. He lost only once to Telugu Desam rivals in 1999 Assembly elections.

Reddy was Minister of Co-Operation and Youth Services in 1980, Archives Minister in 1982, Labour, Employment and Housing Minister from 1990 to 1992, and Civil Supplies Minister in 1993.

As Congress Legislature Party (CLP) leader between 1994 and 1999, he led Congress members in the assembly. He was an effective leader of the opposition during the regime of N.T. Rama Rao and N. Chandrababu Naidu. He led many popular agitations in Hyderabad city against Telugu Desam governments. He was a supporter of separate state for Telangana. He actively fought for a fair share of funds for Telangana region.

== Personal life ==
Reddy was married to Sulochana. They have a son, P. Vishnuvardhan Reddy, and four daughters. Their first daughter, Gayathri Reddy, the second Anuragini Reddy, the third Vijaya Reddy, and the youngest is Pavani Reddy.

Reddy suffered a heart attack on 28 December 2007, while on his way to a party meeting. He was rushed to hospital but died on the way. Thousands of people milled around his house to pay their respects to their leader. He was cremated with state honours in the presence of thousands of his followers and congress leaders.

After Reddy's death, his son P. Vishnuvardhan Reddy and daughter Vijaya Reddy entered into politics. P. Vishnuvardhan Reddy was elected as the MLA from Jubilee Hills Assembly constituency.

Reddy's daughter Vijaya Reddy, initially an independent candidate, joined YSR Congress in 2012. She left YSR Congress to join TRS with her followers in 2014.

== Honors ==
P. Janardhan Reddy's statue was unveiled at the Khairatabad junction on the first anniversary of his death. His daughter, Vijaya Reddy, started the PJR foundation in 2011 for the welfare of the common people.
