= Cumbum, Andhra Pradesh Assembly constituency =

Defunct Legislative Assembly constituency in Andhra Pradesh, India

Coordinates: 15.58°N 79.11°E

Cumbum
- Former constituency for the Andhra Pradesh Legislative Assembly

Constituency details
- Country: India
- Region: South India
- State: Andhra Pradesh
- District: Prakasam
- Lok Sabha constituency: Narasaraopet
- Established: 1951
- Abolished: 2008
- Total electors: 135,131
- Reservation: None

Cumbum was one of the 294 Legislative Assembly constituencies of Andhra Pradesh in India. It was in Prakasam district and was dissolved before the 2009 elections. Most of its area is now part of the Giddalur Assembly constituency.

== History of the constituency ==
The Cumbum constituency was first created for the Madras State Legislative Assembly in 1952. It was dissolved in the 1955 elections due to the passing of the Delimitation Commission of 1952, which was created due to the Delimitation of Parliamentary and Assembly Constituencies Order, 1951. Justice N Chandrasekhara Aiyar, a retired justice of the Supreme Court, was its chairman in 1953. After the passing of the States Reorganisation Act, 1956, it became a part of the new Andhra Pradesh Legislative Assembly. After the passing of the Delimitation of Parliamentary and Assembly Constituencies Order, 1976, its extent was the Cumbum and Ardhaveedu firkas in Giddalur taluk; and Podili taluk (excluding Podili and Marripudi firkas) and Thimmareddipalli firka in Kanigiri taluk.

The Delimitation of Parliamentary and Assembly Constituencies Order, 2008 abolished the constituency and hence was defunct as of the 2009 Andhra Pradesh Legislative Assembly election.

Yerragondapalem Assembly constituency was newly formed as part of the Delimitation of Parliamentary and Assembly Constituencies Order, 2008 and active from the 2009 Andhra Pradesh Legislative Assembly election. after dissolving the Cumbum Assembly Constituency

== Members of the Legislative assembly ==
Madras State
| Year | MLA | Party |
|---|---|---|
| 1952 | Pidathala Ranga Reddy | Indian National Congress |

The constituency did not exist between 1955 and 1976.

Andhra Pradesh
| Year | MLA | Party |
|---|---|---|
| 1978 | Kandula Obula Reddy | Indian National Congress |
| 1983 | Kandula Nagarjuna Reddy | Indian National Congress |
| 1985 | Vudumula Venkata Reddy | Telugu Desam Party |
| 1989 | Kandula Nagarjuna Reddy | Indian National Congress |
| 1994 | Chappidi Vengaiah | Telugu Desam Party |
| 1999 | Kandula Nagarjuna Reddy | Indian National Congress |
| 2004 | Vudumula Srinivasulu Reddy | Indian National Congress |

== Election results ==
=== 2004 ===
2004 Andhra Pradesh Legislative Assembly election: Cumbum
| Party | Candidate | Votes | % | ±% |
|---|---|---|---|---|
| INC | Vudumula Srinivasulu Reddy | 52,738 | 52.62% | |
| TDP | Chegireddy Linga Reddy | 45,116 | 45.01% | |
| Margin of victory | | 7,622 | 7.60% | |
| Turnout | | 100,360 | 74.27% | |
| Registered electors | | 135,131 | | |
| INC hold | | Swing | | |

=== 1999 ===
1999 Andhra Pradesh Legislative Assembly election: Cumbum
| Party | Candidate | Votes | % | ±% |
|---|---|---|---|---|
| INC | Kandula Nagarjuna Reddy | 59,615 | 59.41% | |
| TDP | Chappidi Vengaiah | 39,717 | 39.58% | |
| Margin of victory | | 19,898 | 19.83% | |
| Turnout | | 102,898 | 70.83% | |
| Registered electors | | 145,266 | | |
| INC gain from TDP | | Swing | | |

=== 1994 ===
1994 Andhra Pradesh Legislative Assembly election: Cumbum
| Party | Candidate | Votes | % | ±% |
|---|---|---|---|---|
| TDP | Chappidi Vengaiah | 44,294 | 50.64% | |
| INC | Kandula Nagarjuna Reddy | 39,913 | 45.63% | |
| Margin of victory | | 4,381 | 5.01% | |
| Turnout | | 89,372 | 71.77% | |
| Registered electors | | 124,528 | | |
| TDP gain from INC | | Swing | | |

=== 1989 ===
1989 Andhra Pradesh Legislative Assembly election: Cumbum
| Party | Candidate | Votes | % | ±% |
|---|---|---|---|---|
| INC | Kandula Nagarjuna Reddy | 58,356 | 63.16% | |
| TDP | Vudumula Venkata Reddy | 32,523 | 35.20% | |
| Margin of victory | | 25,833 | 27.96% | |
| Turnout | | 94,463 | 67.80% | |
| Registered electors | | 139,320 | | |
| INC gain from TDP | | Swing | | |

=== 1985 ===
1985 Andhra Pradesh Legislative Assembly election: Cumbum
| Party | Candidate | Votes | % | ±% |
|---|---|---|---|---|
| TDP | Vudumula Venkata Reddy | 39,089 | 50.08% | |
| INC | Kandula Nagarjuna | 36,093 | 46.24% | |
| Margin of victory | | 2,996 | 3.84% | |
| Turnout | | 79,087 | 68.79% | |
| Registered electors | | 114,970 | | |
| TDP gain from INC | | Swing | | |

=== 1983 ===
1983 Andhra Pradesh Legislative Assembly election: Cumbum
| Party | Candidate | Votes | % | ±% |
|---|---|---|---|---|
| INC | Kandula Nagarjuna Reddy | 35,660 | 50.33% | |
| TDP | Vudumula Venkata Reddy | 33,082 | 46.69% | |
| Margin of victory | | 2,578 | 3.64% | |
| Turnout | | 72,145 | 66.29% | |
| Registered electors | | 108,834 | | |
| INC gain from INC(I) | | Swing | | |

=== 1978 ===
1978 Andhra Pradesh Legislative Assembly election: Cumbum
| Party | Candidate | Votes | % | ±% |
|---|---|---|---|---|
| INC(I) | Kandula Obula Reddy | 33,191 | 45.51% | |
| JP | Mohammed Sharief Shaik | 26,712 | 36.62% | |
| Margin of victory | | 6,479 | 8.88% | |
| Turnout | | 74,751 | 71.39% | |
| Registered electors | | 104,715 | | |
| INC(I) win (new seat) | | | | |

=== 1952 ===
1952 Madras Legislative Assembly election: Cumbum
| Party | Candidate | Votes | % | ±% |
|---|---|---|---|---|
| INC | Pidathala Ranga Reddy | 22,468 | 39.37 | |
| Independent | Adapala Ramaswamy | 17,144 | 30.04 | |
| KLP | Kandula Obula Reddy | 15,235 | 26.70 | |
| Socialist | Suggam Purushotham | 2,220 | 3.89 | |
| Margin of victory | | 5,324 | 9.33 | |
| Turnout | | 57,067 | 66.50 | |
| Registered electors | | 85,818 | | |
| INC win (new seat) | | | | |

== See also ==
- List of constituencies of the Andhra Pradesh Legislative Assembly
- Prakasam district
