= Pagadala =

Pagadala is a given name. Notable people with the given name include:

- Pagadala Ramaiah
- Pagadala Niranjan
- Pagadala Naidu
