= Janke Venkata Reddy =

Indian politician

Janke Venkata Reddy (born 1953) is an Indian politician from Andhra Pradesh. He was a former two-time member of the Andhra Pradesh Legislative Assembly from Markapuram Assembly constituency in Prakasam district representing the YSR Congress Party.

== Early life ==
Reddy is from Markapur, Prakasam district, Andhra Pradesh. He is the son of Janke Rami Reddy. He completed his B.Sc in 1972 at V.S.R. College, Tenali, which is affiliated with Andhra University, Viskahapatnam. He is a farmer and declared assets worth Rs.69 lakhs in his affidavit to the Election Commission of India.

== Career ==
Reddy won the Markapuram Assembly constituency in the 2014 Andhra Pradesh Legislative Assembly election representing the YSR Congress Party. He polled 82,411 votes and defeated his nearest rival, Kandula Narayana Reddy of the Telugu Desam Party, by a margin of 9,802 votes. He became an MLA for the first time, winning the Markapuram seat as an independent politician in the 1994 Andhra Pradesh Legislative Assembly election where he defeated Kunduru Pedda Konda Reddy of the Indian National Congress, by a margin of 20,841 votes. He lost to Reddy in both 1989 and 1999 elections as a TDP candidate.
