= Kandula Narayana Reddy =

Indian politician (born 1968)

Member of Legislative Assembly Andhra Pradesh
- Incumbent
- Assumed office 2024
- Preceded by: Kunduru Nagarjuna Reddy
- Constituency: Markapuram

Personal details
- Party: Telugu Desam Party

Kandula Narayana Reddy (born 5 August 1968) is an Indian politician from Andhra Pradesh. He is an MLA from Markapuram Assembly constituency in Markapuram district. He represents Telugu Desam Party. He won the 2024 Andhra Pradesh Legislative Assembly election where TDP had an alliance with BJP and Jana Sena Party.

== Early life and education ==
Reddy is from Markapuram. He was born to Narayana Reddy and Narayanamma. He married Vasantha Lakshmi and they have two children. He completed his intermediate but discontinued his studies during his B.E. at Karnatak University, Dharwad.

== Political career ==
Reddy started his political journey with Telugu Desam Party in 2004. He first contested as an MLA in the 2004 Andhra Pradesh Legislative Assembly election but lost to K. P. Konda Reddy. He became a two time MLA winning the 2024 Andhra Pradesh Legislative Assembly election from Markapuram Assembly constituency representing Telugu Desam Party. He polled 99,005 votes and defeated his nearest rival, Anna Rambabu of YSR Congress Party by a margin of 13,979 votes. Earlier in 2009, he was termed as a giant killer as he won the 2009 Andhra Pradesh Legislative Assembly election by defeating four time MLA of Indian National Congress Kunduru Pedda Konda Reddy by a margin of 9,054 votes. He organised an agitation for about 50 days to demand a separate Markapuram district, with Kanigiri, Giddalur, Darsi, Yerragondapalem, so that the western region would be developed, when TDP forms the government in the state.
