= Markapuram Assembly constituency =

Constituency of the Andhra Pradesh Legislative Assembly, India

Coordinates: 15.75°N 79.27°E

Markapuram
- Constituency No. 111 for the Andhra Pradesh Legislative Assembly
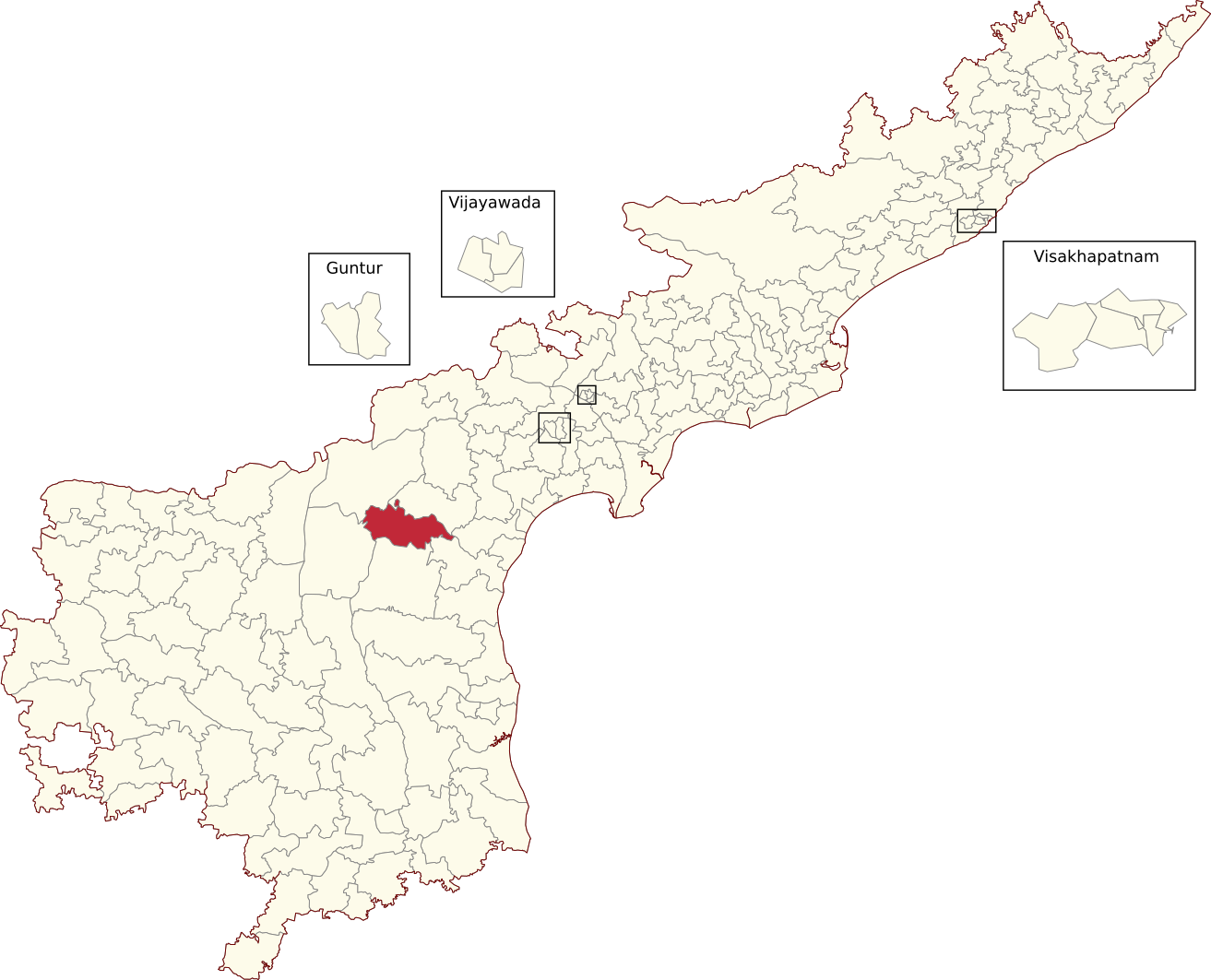
- Location of Markapuram Assembly constituency within Andhra Pradesh

Constituency details
- Country: India
- Region: South India
- State: Andhra Pradesh
- District: Markapuram
- Lok Sabha constituency: Ongole
- Established: 1951
- Total electors: 209,753
- Reservation: None

Member of Legislative Assembly
- 16th Andhra Pradesh Legislative Assembly
- Incumbent Kandula Narayana Reddy
- Party: TDP
- Alliance: NDA
- Elected year: 2024

Markapuram Assembly constituency is a constituency in Markapuram district of Andhra Pradesh that elects representatives to the Andhra Pradesh Legislative Assembly in India. It is one of the seven assembly segments of Ongole Lok Sabha constituency.

Kandula Narayana Reddy is the current MLA of the constituency, having won the 2024 Andhra Pradesh Legislative Assembly election from Telugu Desam Party. As of 2019, there are a total of 209,753 electors in the constituency. The constituency was established in 1951, as per the Delimitation Orders (1951).

== Mandals ==
Kambham
Konakanamitla
Podili
Markapuram
Tarlupadu

== Members of the Legislative Assembly ==
Year	Member	Political party
1952	N. Venkatayya	Krishikar Lok Party
1955	Kandula Obul Reddy	Krishikar Lok Party
1962	Kandula Obul Reddy	Indian National Congress
1967	C. Vengaiah	Independent
1972	M. Nasar Baig	Indian National Congress
1978	Poola Subbaiah	Communist Party of India
1983	V.V. Narayana Reddy	Telugu Desam Party
1985	Kunduru Pedda Konda Reddy	Indian National Congress
1989	Kunduru Pedda Konda Reddy	Indian National Congress
1994	Janke Venkata Reddy	Independent
1999	Kunduru Pedda Konda Reddy	Indian National Congress
2004	Kunduru Pedda Konda Reddy	Indian National Congress
2009	Kandula Narayana Reddy	Telugu Desam Party
2014	Janke Venkata Reddy	YSR Congress Party
2019	Kunduru Nagarjuna Reddy	YSR Congress Party
2024	Kandula Narayana Reddy	Telugu Desam Party

== Election results ==
=== 2024 ===
2024 Andhra Pradesh Legislative Assembly election: Markapur
Party	Candidate	Votes	%	±%
TDP	Kandula Narayana Reddy	99,005	51.85	+10.44
YSRCP	Anna Venkata Rambabu	85,026	44.53	−7.33
NOTA	None Of The Above	1,327	0.7	N/A
Majority		13,979	7.32	−3.08
Turnout		1,90,930	87.53	+2.33
TDP gain from YSRCP		Swing		

=== 2019 ===
2019 Andhra Pradesh Legislative Assembly election: Markapur
Party	Candidate	Votes	%	±%
YSRCP	Kunduru Nagarjuna Reddy	92,680	51.86	+1.09
TDP	Kandula Narayana Reddy	74,013	41.41	−3.32
JSP	Emmadi Kasinadh	5506	3.10	N/A
Majority		18,667	10.44	
Turnout		178,712	85.20	+4.89
YSRCP hold		Swing		

=== 2014 ===
2014 Andhra Pradesh Legislative Assembly election: Markapur
Party	Candidate	Votes	%	±%
YSRCP	Janke Venkata Reddy	82,411	50.77	
TDP	Kandula Narayana Reddy	72,609	44.73	−4.2
INC	Dr.Eluri Ramachandrareddy	1956	1.5	
Majority		9,802	6.04	
Turnout		162,328	81.63	+4.89
YSRCP gain from TDP		Swing		

=== 2009 ===
2009 Andhra Pradesh Legislative Assembly election: Markapur
Party	Candidate	Votes	%	±%
TDP	Kandula Narayana Reddy	69,744	48.93	+18.54
INC	Pedda Konda Reddy Kunduru	60,690	42.58	−4.68
PRP	Javed Hussain Baig Mirja	6,108	4.28	
Majority		9,054	6.35	
Turnout		142,545	76.74	+2.76
TDP gain from INC		Swing		

=== 2004 ===
2004 Andhra Pradesh Legislative Assembly election: Markapur
Party	Candidate	Votes	%	±%
INC	Pedda Konda Reddy Kunduru	58,108	47.26	−4.82
TDP	Kandula Narayana Reddy	37,370	30.39	−16.30
Majority		20,738	16.87	
Turnout		122,964	73.98	+0.84
INC hold		Swing		

=== 1999 ===
1999 Andhra Pradesh Legislative Assembly election: Markapur
Party	Candidate	Votes	%	±%
INC	Kunduru Pedda Konda Reddy	62,625	52.08%	
TDP	Janke Venkata Reddy	56,504	46.99%	
Margin of victory		6,121	5.09%	
Turnout		123,402	75.07%	
Registered electors		164,386		
INC gain from Independent		Swing		

=== 1994 ===
1994 Andhra Pradesh Legislative Assembly election: Markapur
Party	Candidate	Votes	%	±%
Independent	Janke Venkata Reddy	60,328	55.01%	
INC	Kunduru Pedda Konda Reddy	39,487	38.95%	
Margin of victory		20,841	19.00%	
Turnout		111,903	76.01%	
Registered electors		147,212		
Independent gain from INC		Swing		

=== 1989 ===
1989 Andhra Pradesh Legislative Assembly election: Markapur
Party	Candidate	Votes	%	±%
INC	Kunduru Pedda Konda Reddy	52,247	51.24%	
TDP	Janke Venkata Reddy	49,616	48.76%	
Margin of victory		2,531	2.49%	
Turnout		106,030	71.49%	
Registered electors		148,307		
INC hold		Swing		

=== 1985 ===
1985 Andhra Pradesh Legislative Assembly election: Markapur
Party	Candidate	Votes	%	±%
INC	Kunduru Pedda Konda Reddy	41,333	49.42%	
CPI	Poola Subbaiah	34,326	41.04%	
Margin of victory		7,007	8.38%	
Turnout		85,052	69.61%	
Registered electors		122,179		
INC gain from TDP		Swing		

=== 1983 ===
1983 Andhra Pradesh Legislative Assembly election: Markapur
Party	Candidate	Votes	%	±%
TDP	V.V. Narayana Reddy	40,302	55.71%	
INC	Dodda Chalama Reddy	20,949	28.96%	
Margin of victory		19,353	26.75%	
Turnout		73,641	65.87%	
Registered electors		111,795		
TDP gain from CPI		Swing		

=== 1978 ===
1978 Andhra Pradesh Legislative Assembly election: Markapur
Party	Candidate	Votes	%	±%
CPI	Poola Subbaiah	36,693	38.51%	
JP	Venna Venkata Narayana Reddy	27,947	38.39%	
Margin of victory		8746	0.11%	
Turnout		74,507	72.46%	
Registered electors		102,828		
CPI gain from INC		Swing		

=== 1972 ===
1972 Andhra Pradesh Legislative Assembly election: Markapur
Party	Candidate	Votes	%	±%
INC	M Nasar Baig	29,500	62.36%	
ABJS	Adapala Kuppu Swamy	16,343	34.55%	
Margin of victory		13,157	27.81%	
Turnout		48,225	60.43%	
Registered electors		79,798		
INC gain from Independent		Swing		

=== 1967 ===
1967 Andhra Pradesh Legislative Assembly election: Markapur
Party	Candidate	Votes	%	±%
Independent	C Vengaiah	27,335	50.06%	
INC	Kandula Obula Reddy	24,535	44.93%	
Margin of victory		2,800	5.13%	
Turnout		56,832	77.32%	
Registered electors		73,498		
Independent gain from INC		Swing		

=== 1962 ===
1962 Andhra Pradesh Legislative Assembly election: Markapur
Party	Candidate	Votes	%	±%
INC	Kandula Obula Reddy	25,786	66.32%	
Independent	Muthakapalli Moorthi Reddy	13,093	33.68%	
Margin of victory		12,693	32.65%	
Turnout		40,727	64.53%	
Registered electors		63,018		
INC gain from KLP		Swing		

=== 1955 ===
1955 Andhra Pradesh Legislative Assembly election: Markapur
Party	Candidate	Votes	%	±%
KLP	Kandula Obula Reddy	23,463	60.38%	
CPI	Poola Subbaiah	15,394	39.62%	
Margin of victory		8,069	20.77%	
Turnout		38,857	59.91%	
Registered electors		64,859		
KLP hold		Swing		

=== 1952 ===
1952 Madras State Legislative Assembly election: Markapur
Party	Candidate	Votes	%	±%
KLP	N. Venkatayya	11,957	32.91%	
Independent	Yekkali Ramaiah	6,758	18.60%	
INC	M. Mahaboob Baig	5,118	14.09%	14.09%
Independent	P. Viswanatha Rao	4,543	12.50%	
Independent	M. Khasim Sahib	4,477	12.32%	
Socialist Party (India)	C. Raghaviah	3,480	9.58%	
Margin of victory		5,199	14.31%	
Turnout		36,333	51.45%	
Registered electors		70,623		
win (new seat)				

== See also ==
- List of constituencies of Andhra Pradesh Legislative Assembly
