= Pidathala Sai Kalpana =

Indian politician

Pidathala Sai Kalpana Reddy (born 1959) is an Indian politician from Andhra Pradesh. She was elected as an MLA in 2001 from Giddalur Assembly constituency in the erstwhile Prakasam district.

== Early life ==
Sai Kalpana studied at St. Theresa High School, Eluru and passed SSLC in 1974. She did her Intermediate at St. Theresa Junior College and passed out in 1976. Later, she did her M.B.B.S at Ranga Raya Medical College, Kakinada but discontinued the course in 1978.

== Career ==
Sai Kalpana won to the Giddalur Assembly constituency representing the Telugu Desam Party in the 2001 bye election which was caused by the death of her husband and sitting MLA, Pidathala Vijay Kumar Reddy. Her husband, Vijay Kumar Reddy, who won the seat on TDP ticket in the 1999 Assembly election died in 2001. She polled 53,919 votes and defeated her nearest rival Mudiam Peera Reddy of the Indian National Congress.

She also contested the Lok Sabha election in 2009 from Ongole Lok Sabha constituency representing Praja Rajyam Party. She polled 142,303 votes and finished behind winner, Magunta Srinivasulu Reddy of the Indian National Congress and Madduluri Malakondaiah Yadav of the Telugu Desam Party, who finished second.
