= Kunduru Nagarjuna Reddy =

Indian politician (born 1981)

Kunduru Nagarjuna Reddy (born 1981) is an Indian politician from Andhra Pradesh. He was an MLA of YSR Congress Party from Markapuram Assembly constituency in Prakasam district. He won the 2019 Andhra Pradesh Legislative Assembly election. He shifted to Giddalur constituency but lost the seat to TDP in the 2024 Assembly election.

== Early life and education ==
Reddy was born in Pedda Konda Reddy village, Chennakesava Nagar, Markapuram. His father, Kunduru Peda Konda Reddy, a former four time MLA, also from Giddalur. He did his Master of Science from University of Houston, Texas, USA. He worked as a software engineer at Wincor Nixdorf in San Francisco, California from 2007 to 2010. Later, he returned to India and worked at Newton's Institute of Engineering in Macherla.

== Political career ==
Reddy became an MLA for the first time winning the 2019 Andhra Pradesh Legislative Assembly election representing YSR Congress Party from Markapuram Assembly constituency. He defeated Kandula Narayana Reddy of Telugu Desam Party by a margin of 18,667 votes. He shifted to the neighbouring Giddalur Assembly constituency for the 2024 election and polled 97,490 votes. But he lost the Giddalur seat to Muthumula Ashok Reddy by a margin of 973 votes.
