= Kandula Obul Reddy =

Indian politician

Member of Parliament, Lok Sabha
- In office 1977–1984
- Preceded by: Y. Eswara Reddy
- Succeeded by: D. Narayana Reddy
- Constituency: Kadapa

Member of Legislative Assembly Andhra Pradesh
- In office 1972–1977
- Preceded by: Poola Subbaiah
- Succeeded by: Constituency Dissolved (Again retained in 2009 as per 2008 Delimitation Act)
- Constituency: Yerragondapalem
- In office 1956–1967
- Preceded by: Andhra Pradesh Assembly Created
- Succeeded by: C. Vengaiah
- Constituency: Markapuram

Member of Legislative Assembly Andhra State
- In office 1955–1956
- Preceded by: N. Venkataiah
- Succeeded by: Andhra Pradesh Assembly Created
- Constituency: Markapuram

Personal details
- Born: 7 July 1901, Madras Presidency
- Died: 3 January 1993 (aged 91)
- Party: Indian National Congress
- Other political affiliations: Krishikar Lok Party
- Spouse: Kandula Gaja Lakshmi
- Children: 3
- Parents: Kandula Nagi Reddy (father); Kandula Chennamma (mother)
- Profession: Politician

Kandula Obul Reddy (7 July 1901 – 3 January 1993), known as Obul Reddy, was an Indian politician. He held prominent roles throughout his career, serving as the General Secretary of the Congress for Madras State and later as a Cabinet Minister and as a Parliamentarian.

His contributions extended beyond the realm of politics, as he also served as the chairman for APSRTC and AP Agricultural University. He also held the position of Honorary Life President of the AP Freedom Fighters Association.

== Early life ==
Kandula Obul Reddy was born on 7 July 1901 in Madras State. He was born into a prosperous agrarian family to parents Kandula Nagireddy and Chennamma. He completed his primary education in Bogolu and Kambham, and pursued high school in Kurnool town. Later, he joined Loyola College in Madras but left before completing his studies to continue at Madanapalle BT College.

== Political career ==
While studying in Kurnool, he came under the influence of the nationalist leader Bal Gangadhar Tilak, and later developed admiration for Mahatma Gandhi. His strong nationalist outlook prompted him to withdraw from Loyola College under British administration. He was a key leader of the farmers' revolts in the Prakasam region, who faced British colonial rulers with unflinching courage during India's struggle for independence. He was instrumental in sowing the seeds for the formation of the united Prakasam district.

During this period, he met Chegireddy Balireddy of nearby Bogolu village. Together, they worked to strengthen the independence movement in the region. Their political journey took a turn when they came into contact with Acharya N. G. Ranga, a prominent leader who was actively mobilizing farmers against the feudal zamindari exploitation. Ranga’s ideas deeply inspired both Obul Reddy and Balireddy. Under Ranga’s mentorship, they joined the Kisan (Farmers) School he established in Nidubrolu, where they met other like-minded leaders such as Pedireddy Thimmareddy and Paturi Rajagopala Naidu. Among them, Obul Reddy soon became Ranga’s most devoted disciple. In 1934, he became Principal of the Farmers’ School and successfully conducted training programs.

Standing firmly by Ranga, Obul Reddy played a crucial role in the farmers’ movements across Andhra against zamindari oppression and exploitation through unfair taxes and bonded labor. Between 1936 and 1938, he served as the President of the Andhra Pradesh Kisan Congress. He fought to abolish the practice of vetti chakiri (bonded labor) prevalent in the Giddalur-Kambham region. In 1939, he was elected unopposed to the Kurnool District Board and continued to rise politically, later becoming Kurnool District Congress President (1939–41).

When the Quit India Movement erupted in 1942, Obul Reddy actively participated and was arrested, spending nearly two years in Thanjavur and Vellore jails as a political detainee. In 1946, when his mentor Ranga became the State Congress President, Obul Reddy was unanimously chosen as the State General Secretary, serving until 1951. During this period, he strengthened Ranga’s faction within the Congress.

However, internal divisions arose within the Congress between the Ranga–Prakasam Pantulu faction and the camp led by Kala Venkata Rao and Neelam Sanjiva Reddy. Despite many capable leaders supporting Ranga, the party high command leaned toward the latter group. Consequently, in 1951, Ranga, along with his followers and Prakasam Pantulu, resigned from the Congress Party. Though attempts were made by Neelam to win Obul Reddy over, he remained loyal to Ranga.

Despite his allegiance to Ranga, Obul Reddy earned the respect of Sardar Vallabhbhai Patel, who valued him greatly. In 1948, when Telangana leaders K. V. Ranga Reddy and Marri Chenna Reddy sought India’s intervention to integrate the Nizam’s Hyderabad State with the Indian Union, Obul Reddy played a pivotal role in facilitating their meeting with Patel. Until Patel’s death, Obul Reddy maintained a close personal relationship with him.

In 1951, when Ranga formed the Krishikar Lok Party, Obul Reddy took charge of organizational affairs. In the 1952 Assembly elections, he contested from Kambham but faced an unexpected defeat to Pidatala Rangareddy. Despite this, Ranga continued to entrust him with key party responsibilities. In 1955, Obul Reddy contested from Markapuram and was elected as an MLA for the first time.

Between 1955–56, he served as Minister for Agriculture, Forests, and Animal Husbandry in the Bezawada Gopal Reddy cabinet. He, however, resigned his post in support of the movement for the creation of Andhra Pradesh State. In 1962, he was re-elected from Markapuram but did not receive a ministerial position.

In the 1967 elections, he contested again from Markapuram but was defeated by Chappidi Vengayya, a prominent lawyer aligned with his rival Pidatala Rangareddy. Despite this setback, he continued to serve the people—becoming Sarpanch of Bodapadu village and later Chairman of the Markapuram Taluk Development Board. In 1972, he won again from Yerragondapalem, marking his third MLA term.

In 1978, representing Indira Congress, he won from Kambham for the fourth time and served as Minister for Small and Medium Irrigation Projects in Marri Chenna Reddy’s cabinet until 1980. He later chaired the Andhra Pradesh State Road Transport Corporation (APSRTC) from 1982–83. Though N. T. Rama Rao later invited him to join the Telugu Desam Party, Obul Reddy politely declined and retired from active politics. Yet, even during the 1983 TDP wave, he ensured his son’s victory in Kambham, demonstrating his enduring influence.

As Minister, he implemented several farmer-friendly reforms, including abolishing the outdated Pullari tax collection system, offering relief to farmers.

Throughout his career, Obul Reddy mentored many politicians from agrarian and middle-class backgrounds who later rose to prominence, including future Chief Ministers Marri Chenna Reddy, Bhavanam Venkatarami Reddy, and Kotl Vijayabhaskar Reddy.

Obul Reddy was among the first to advocate for the creation of the Markapuram district, recognizing the developmental needs of the forested areas of Giddalur, Kambham, and Markapuram (then part of Kurnool). However, his 1967 electoral defeat silenced his proposal. Subsequently, Pidatala Rangareddy, leveraging his state-level influence, promoted the idea with the support of ministers Nallamothu Chenchurama Naidu and Ronda Narapareddy, leading to the creation of Ongole district in 1972, later renamed Prakasam District.

Obul Reddy welcomed naming the district after Tanguturi Prakasam Pantulu and praised his rival Rangareddy for strengthening the Markapuram division. He admired the Communist legend Poola Subbaiah and maintained cordial relations with those who defeated him politically, such as Chappidi Vengayy.

An advocate for farmers, Obul Reddy raised his voice in the Assembly for agrarian welfare. He was instrumental in establishing the Agricultural College at Idulapadu, Bapatla Taluk, and served as Chairman of the Andhra Pradesh Agricultural University (now Acharya N. G. Ranga Agricultural University) at Rajendranagar from 1964–71.

After retiring from politics, he worked for farmers’ prosperity, envisioning Andhra Pradesh as a state rich in agriculture and rural well-being.

== Death ==
After more than seven decades of service—as a freedom fighter, farmer leader, and statesman—Kandula Obul Reddy passed away on January 3, 1993, at his native Lingapuram village, at the age of 82. In honor of his contributions, the state government named the Gundlakamma Reservoir Project after him.

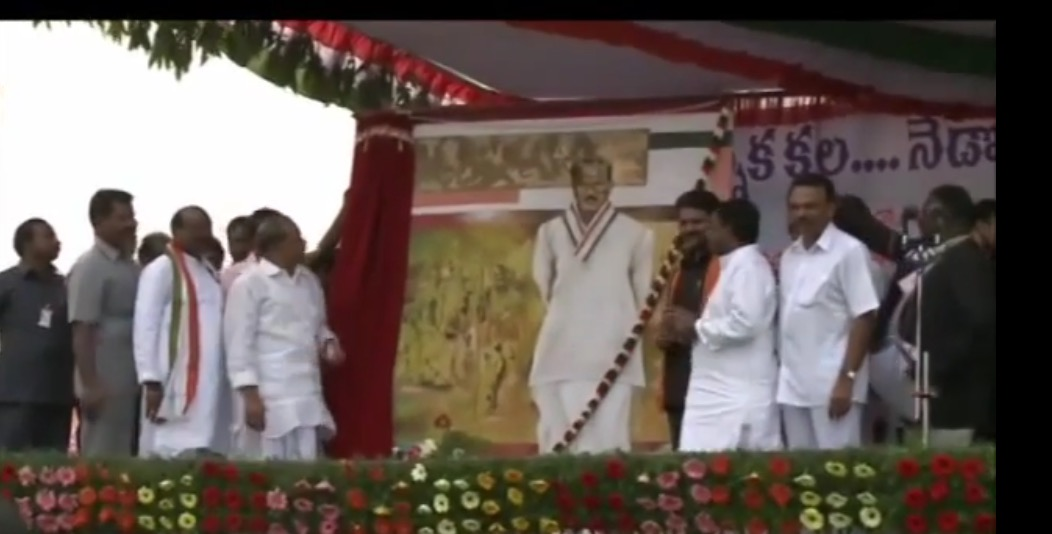
Gundakammla Reservoir Project Grand Opening Ceremony by Y. S. Rajasekhara Reddy

== Gundlakamma Reservoir Project ==
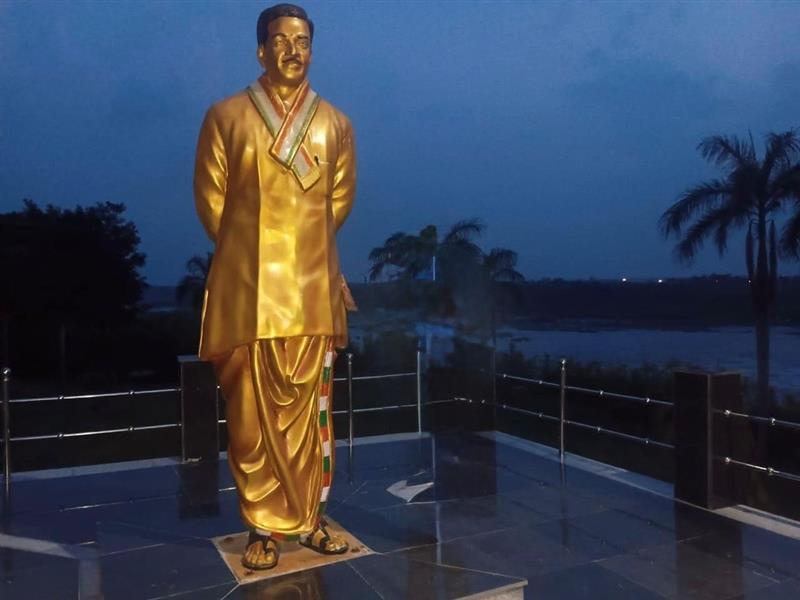
Statue at Gundlakamma Reservoir Project

Kandula Obul Reddy Gundlakamma Reservoir Project: Gundlakamma Reservoir Project is an irrigation project located in Prakasam district in Andhra Pradesh, India. The project is named after Late Kandula Obul Reddy. It is expected to provide irrigation facilities to an ayacut of 80,060 Acres (32,400 Ha) under Rabi and 62,368 Acres (25,240 Ha) under Khariff for the lands covered in 6 Mandals and drinking water supply to 43 villages enroute and Ongole town Municipality round the year in Prakasam District.

== Timeline ==
- 1918: Attended Kurnool High School.
- 1924: Pursued studies at MadanaPalli Degree College (Chittor District).
- 1942: Led the Shistu (Tax) Nirakarna Udyamam in Tippyapalem Village, Markapuram (Tq), was arrested, and spent 2 years in Yerravade Jail, where he encountered Gandhi.
- 1944: Engaged in Rythu Udyamam alongside NG Raga, arrested, and served 1 year and 9 months in Madras Central Jail.
- 1952: Contested the Cumbum Constituency on behalf of Krishikar Lok Party but lost to Adapala Ramaswami (CPI).
- 1955: Elected as MLA for India National Congress (INC), defeating P. Subbiah, and served as Minister for Forest and Agriculture.
- 1962: Secured victory as MLA for INC from Markapuram, assuming the role of Agricultural Minister.
- 1967: Faced defeat in elections against Independent C.Vengiaah from Markapuram.
- 1972: Won the MLA seat for INC from Yerragonda Palam against P. Subbiah, appointed as Agriculture Minister.
- 1978: Emerged victorious as MLA for INC from Cumbum against Md. Sharif (Janata Party), serving as Medium & Major Irrigation Minister. He spearheaded numerous irrigation projects, laying foundation stones for several initiatives during his tenure, aimed at agricultural enhancement and the transformation of Andhra Pradesh into fertile land.

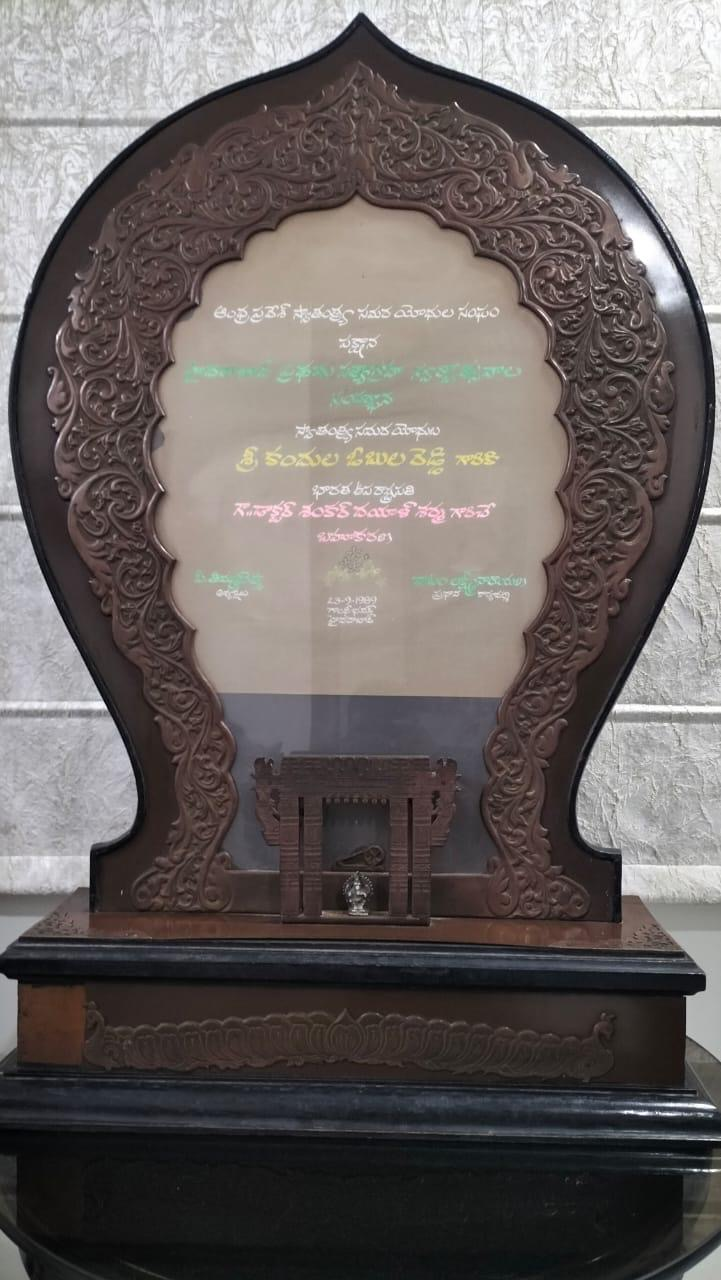

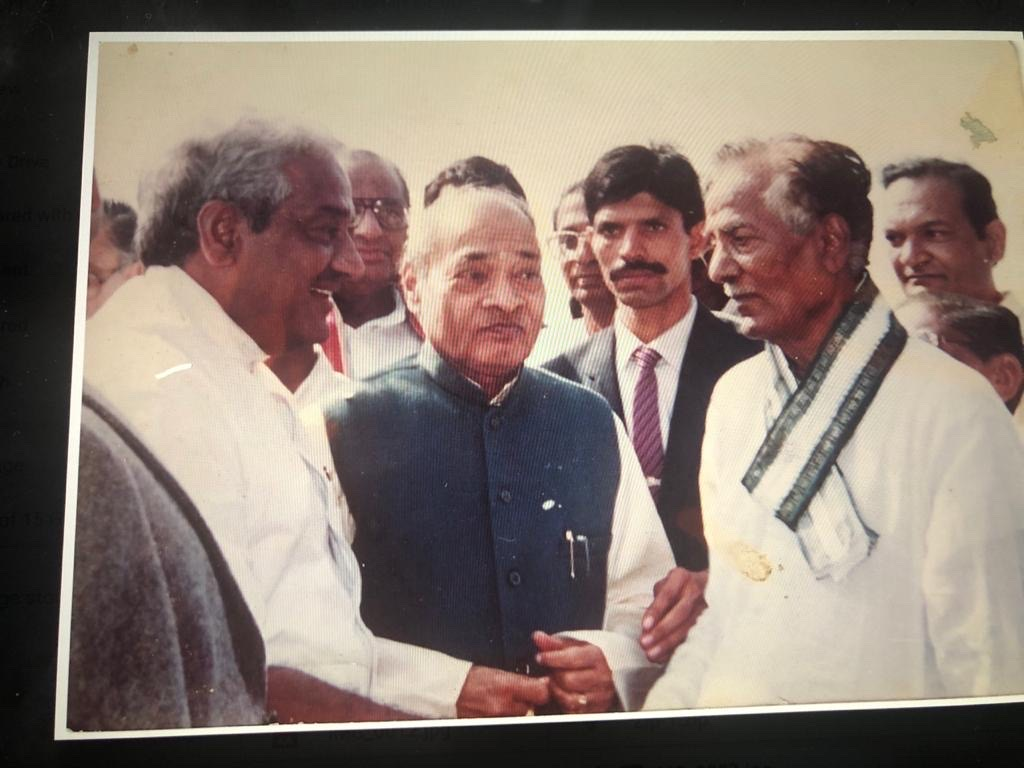
Kandula Obul Reddy with P.V. Narasimha Rao

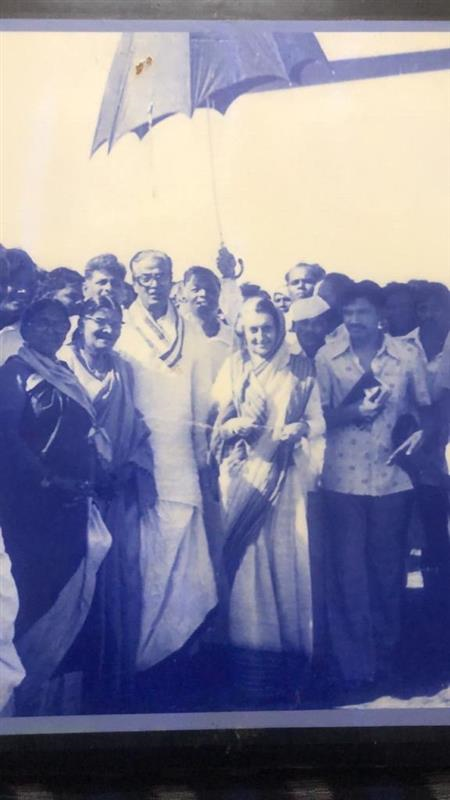
Kandula Obul Reddy with Indira Gandhi
