= Anna Rambabu =

Indian politician

Rambabu
- అన్నా రాంబాబు
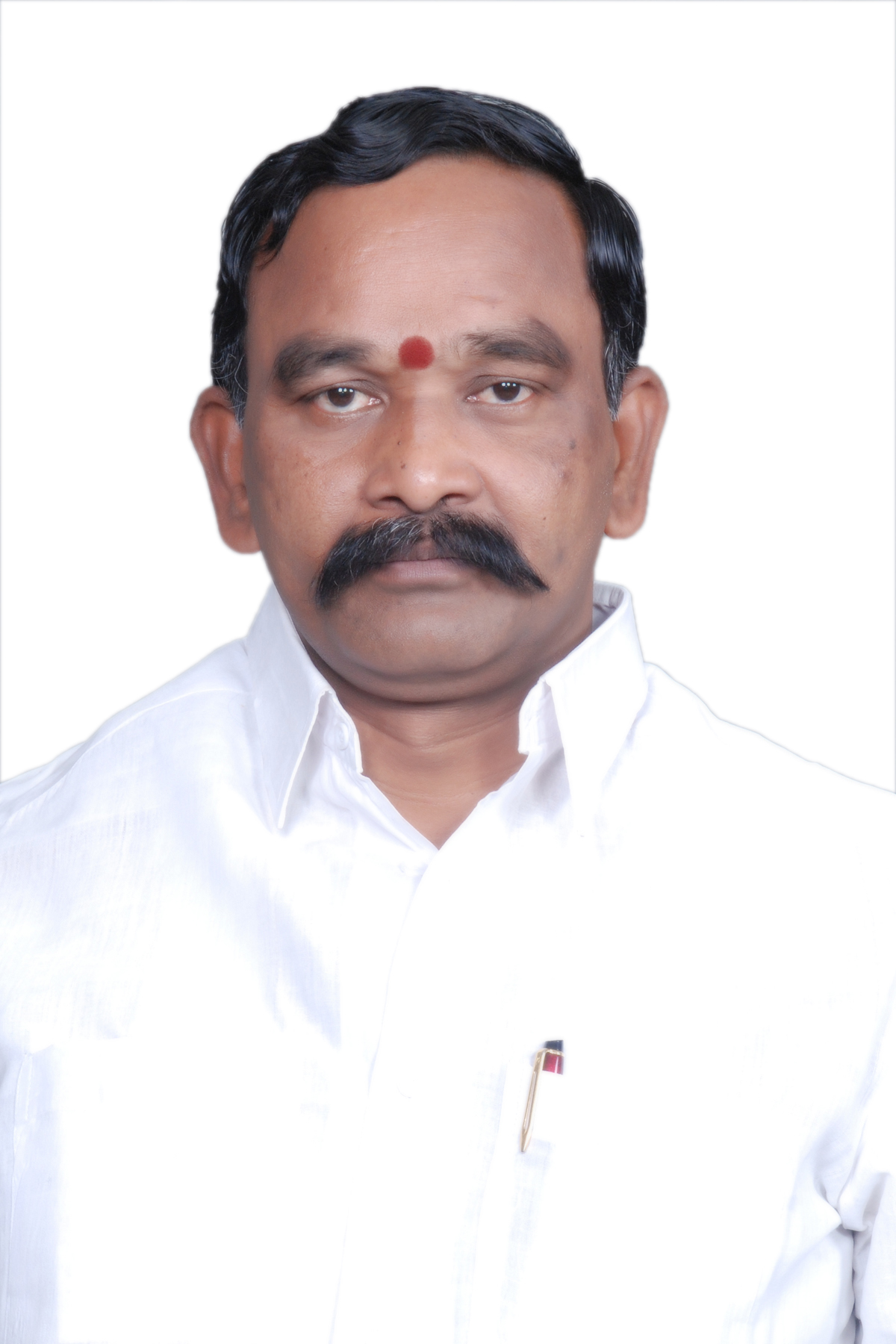

Member of Legislative Assembly, Giddalur, Andhra Pradesh
- Opponent: Muthumula Ashok Reddy
- Constituency: Giddaluru
- In office 12 June 2019 – 2024

Personal details
- Party: YSR Congress Party
- Other political affiliations: Praja Rajyam Party
- Children: Krishna Chaitanya Anna

Anna Rambabu is an Indian politician and Member of Legislative Assembly from Giddalur (Assembly Constituency) in the state of Andhra Pradesh. He contested to Andhra Pradesh Legislative Assembly as a YSRCP candidate in the year 2019 and won against TDP candidate Ashok Reddy Muthumula with a majority of 81,035 votes, which is the second highest majority in the state of Andhra Pradesh, only after Y.S.Jagan Mohan Reddy, the Chief Minister of Andhra Pradesh.
