= Muthumula Ashok Reddy =

Indian politician (born 1968)

Member of the Andhra Pradesh Legislative Assembly
- Incumbent
- Assumed office 2024
- Preceded by: Anna Rambabu
- Constituency: Giddalur
- In office 2014–2019
- Preceded by: Anna Rambabu
- Succeeded by: Anna Rambabu
- Constituency: Giddalur

Personal details
- Party: Telugu Desam Party
- Other political affiliations: YSR Congress Party
- Occupation: Politician

Muthumula Ashok Reddy (born 15 July 1968) is an Indian politician from Andhra Pradesh. He is an MLA from Giddalur Assembly constituency in Prakasam district. He represents Telugu Desam Party. He won the 2024 Andhra Pradesh Legislative Assembly election where TDP had an alliance with BJP and Jana Sena Party.

== Early life and education ==
Reddy is from Giddalur, Prakasam district. His father's name is Muthumula Ramachandra Reddy. He runs his own business. He completed his intermediate, the pre university course, in 1985 at Sri Vivekananda Junior College, Giddalur.

== Political career ==
Reddy won the 2024 Andhra Pradesh Legislative Assembly election from Giddalur Assembly constituency representing Telugu Desam Party. He polled 98,463 votes and defeated K. P. Nagarjuna Reddy of YSR Congress Party by a narrow margin of 973 votes. Earlier, he won the 2014 Andhra Pradesh Legislative Assembly election from Giddalur representing YSR Congress Party. He defeated Anna Rambabu of Telugu Desam Party by a margin of 12,893 votes.
