= Giddalur Assembly constituency =

Constituency of the Andhra Pradesh Legislative Assembly, India

Coordinates: 15.38°N 78.92°E

Giddalur
- Constituency No. 112 for the Andhra Pradesh Legislative Assembly
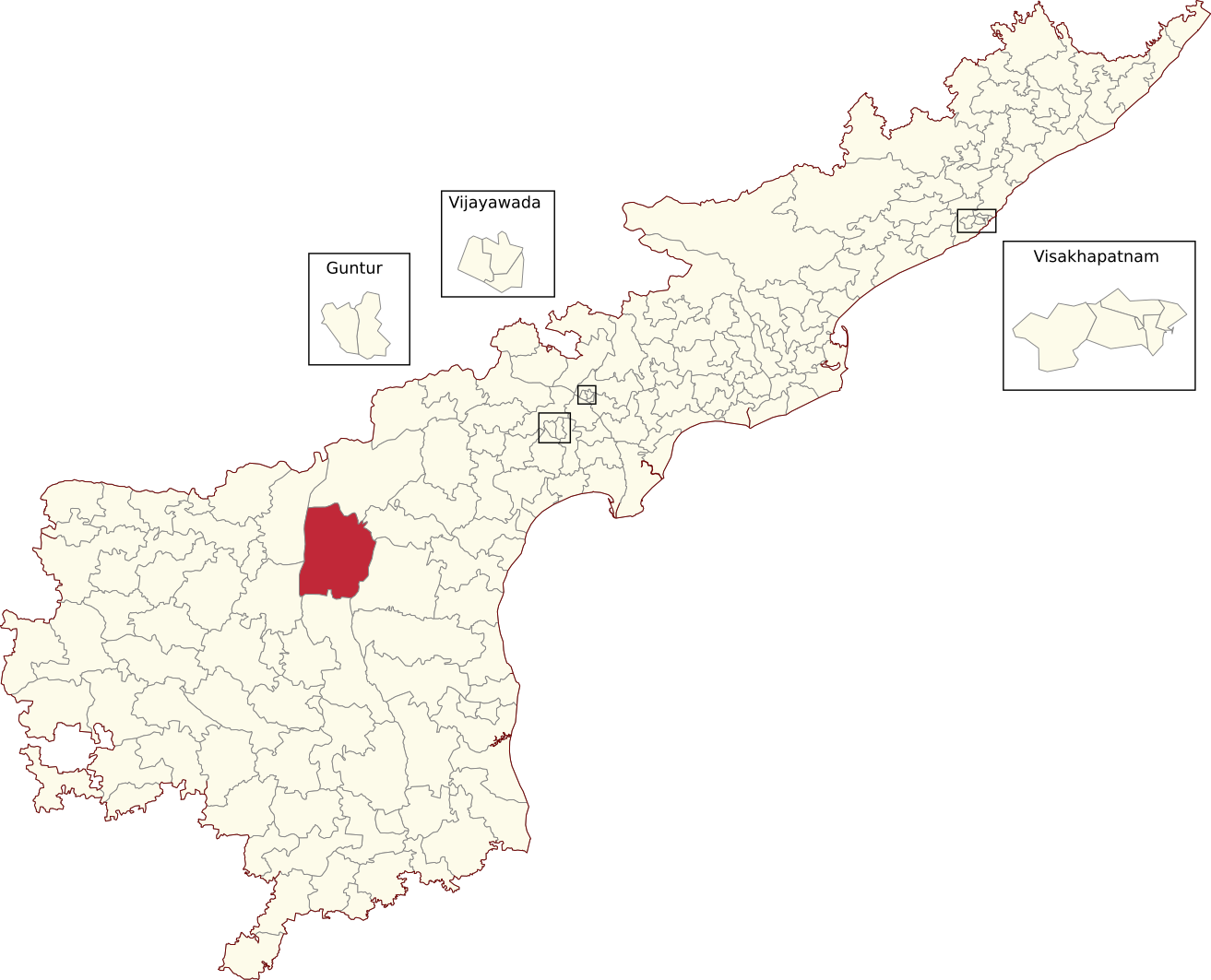
- Location of Giddalur Assembly constituency within Andhra Pradesh

Constituency details
- Country: India
- Region: South India
- State: Andhra Pradesh
- District: Markapuram
- Lok Sabha constituency: Ongole
- Established: 1955
- Total electors: 232,920
- Reservation: None

Member of Legislative Assembly
- 16th Andhra Pradesh Legislative Assembly
- Incumbent Muthumula Ashok Reddy
- Party: TDP
- Alliance: NDA
- Elected year: 2024

Giddalur Assembly constituency is a constituency in Markapuram district of Andhra Pradesh that elects representatives to the Andhra Pradesh Legislative Assembly in India. It is one of the seven assembly segments of Ongole Lok Sabha constituency.

Muthumula Ashok Reddy is the current MLA of the constituency, having won the 2024 Andhra Pradesh Legislative Assembly election from Telugu Desam Party. As of 2024, there are a total of 232,920 electors in the constituency. The constituency was established in 1955, as per the Delimitation Orders (1955).

== History ==
It was part of the Kurnool district until 1969, being merged into Prakasam district in 1970. Before 2008, it was under Nandyal parliament segment, and after the delimitation it was moved to Ongole MP segment.

== Mandals ==
Mandal
Bestavaripeta
Racherla
Giddalur
Komarolu
Cumbum
Ardhaveedu

== Members of the Legislative Assembly ==
Year	Member	Political party
1955	Pidatala Ranga Reddy	Indian National Congress
1962	Edula Balarami Reddy	Independent
1967	Dappili Pandu Ranga Reddy	Independent
1972	Pidatala Ranga Reddy	Indian National Congress
1978	Pidatala Ranga Reddy	Janata Party
1983	Mudiam Peera Reddy	Independent
1985	Pidatala Ranga Reddy	Telugu Desam Party
1989	Yalluri Venkata Reddy	Indian National Congress
1994	Pidathala Ramabhupala Reddy	Telugu Desam Party
1999	Pidathala Vijay Kumar Reddy	Telugu Desam Party
2001*	Pidathala Sai Kalpana	Telugu Desam Party
2004	Pagadala Ramaiah	Indian National Congress
2009	Anna Rambabu	Praja Rajyam Party
2014	Muthumula Ashok Reddy	YSR Congress Party
2019	Anna Rambabu	YSR Congress Party
2024	Muthumula Ashok Reddy	Telugu Desam Party

*By-election

== Election results ==
=== 2024 ===
2024 Andhra Pradesh Legislative Assembly election: Giddalur
Party	Candidate	Votes	%	±%
TDP	Muthumula Ashok Reddy	98,463	47.60	+21.04
YSRCP	Kunduru Nagarjuna Reddy	97,490	47.13	−20.77
INC	Pagadala Pedda Rangaswamy	2,879	1.39	
Independent	Malyadri Reddy Balasani	178	0.09	
NOTA	None Of The Above	2,251	1.09	
Majority		973	0.47	
Turnout		2,06,869		
TDP gain from YSRCP		Swing		

=== 2019 ===
2019 Andhra Pradesh Legislative Assembly election: Giddalur
Party	Candidate	Votes	%	±%
YSRCP	Anna Rambabu	133,130	67.90%	
TDP	Muthumula Ashok Reddy	52,076	26.56%	
Majority		81,035	41.34%	34.26%
Turnout		1,96,036	84.16%	75%
YSRCP hold		Swing		

=== 2014 ===
2014 Andhra Pradesh Legislative Assembly election: Giddalur
Party	Candidate	Votes	%	±%
YSRCP	Muthumula Ashok Reddy	94,413	55.33	
TDP	Anna Rambabu	81,520	44.77	
Majority		12,893	7.08	
Turnout		182,105	82.41	+8.04
YSRCP gain from PRP		Swing		

=== 2009 ===
2009 Andhra Pradesh state assembly elections: Giddalur
Party	Candidate	Votes	%	±%
PRP	Anna Rambabu	55,573	37.54	
INC	Bhiraboina Chandrasekhar	48,027	32.44	−25.65
TDP	Chegireddy Linga Reddy	34,097	23.03	−12.87
Majority		7,546	5.10	
Turnout		148,030	74.37	+2.77
PRP gain from INC		Swing		

=== 2004 ===
2004 Andhra Pradesh Legislative Assembly election: Giddalur
Party	Candidate	Votes	%	±%
INC	Pagadala Ramaiah	50,987	58.09	+14.38
TDP	Pidathala Sai Kalpana	31,505	35.90	−12.88
Majority		19,482	22.19	
Turnout		87.767	71.60	+8.66
INC gain from TDP		Swing		

=== 1999 ===
1999 Andhra Pradesh Legislative Assembly election: Giddalu
Party	Candidate	Votes	%	±%
TDP	Pidathala Vijay Kumar Reddy	38,136	48.78%	
INC	Pagadala Ramaiah	34,954	44.71%	
Margin of victory		3,182	4.07%	
Turnout		80,598	64.88%	
Registered electors		124,224		
TDP hold		Swing		

=== 1994 ===
1994 Andhra Pradesh Legislative Assembly election: Giddalur
Party	Candidate	Votes	%	±%
TDP	Pidathala Ramabhupala Reddy	29,496	40.83%	
Independent	Mudiam Peera Reddy	20,035	27.73%	
Margin of victory		9,461	13.10%	
Turnout		73,819	71.10%	
Registered electors		103,820		
TDP gain from INC		Swing		

=== 1989 ===
1989 Andhra Pradesh Legislative Assembly election: Giddalur
Party	Candidate	Votes	%	±%
INC	Yalluri Venkata Reddy	45,694	58.26%	
TDP	Pidathala Vijay Kumar Reddy	31,774	40.51%	
Margin of victory		13,920	17.75%	
Turnout		80,884	64.16%	
Registered electors		126,057		
INC gain from TDP		Swing		

=== 1985 ===
1985 Andhra Pradesh Legislative Assembly election: Giddalur
Party	Candidate	Votes	%	±%
TDP	Pidathala Ranga Reddy	40,577	59.86%	
INC	Mudiam Peera Reddy	24,315	35.87%	
Margin of victory		16,262	23.99%	
Turnout		68,878	66.54%	
Registered electors		103,520		
TDP gain from Independent		Swing		

=== 1983 ===
1983 Andhra Pradesh Legislative Assembly election: Giddalur
Party	Candidate	Votes	%	±%
Independent	Mudiam Peera Reddy	32,853	52.23%	
INC	Pidatala Ranga Reddy	30,049	47.77%	
Margin of victory		2,804	4.46%	
Turnout		64,012	65.90%	
Registered electors		97,128		
Independent gain from JP		Swing		

=== 1978 ===
1978 Andhra Pradesh Legislative Assembly election: Giddalur
Party	Candidate	Votes	%	±%
JP	Pidatala Ranga Reddy	30,705	49.44%	
INC(I)	Mudiam Peera Reddy	20,533	33.06%	
Margin of victory		10,172	16.38%	
Turnout		65,017	71.14%	
Registered electors		91,389		
JP gain from INC		Swing		

=== 1972 ===
1972 Andhra Pradesh Legislative Assembly election: Giddalur
Party	Candidate	Votes	%	±%
INC	Pidatala Ranga Reddy	43,706	83.48%	
SWA	Jadi Narayana	6,168	11.78%	
Margin of victory		37,538	71.69%	
Turnout		53,230	69.14%	
Registered electors		76,984		
INC hold		Swing		

=== 1967 ===
1967 Andhra Pradesh Legislative Assembly election: Giddalur
Party	Candidate	Votes	%	±%
INC	Pidatala Ranga Reddy	29,970	60.98%	
Independent	A.R.Swami	13,832	28.15%	
Margin of victory		16,138	32.84%	
Turnout		50,957	71.26%	
Registered electors		71,510		
INC gain from Independent		Swing		

=== 1962 ===
1962 Andhra Pradesh Legislative Assembly election: Giddalur
Party	Candidate	Votes	%	±%
Independent	Edula Balarami Reddy	25,630	51.71%	
INC	Pidathala Ranga Reddy	23,934	48.29%	
Margin of victory		1,696	3.42%	
Turnout		51,536	70.67%	
Registered electors		72,921		
Independent gain from INC		Swing		

=== 1955 ===
1955 Andhra State Legislative Assembly election: Giddalur
Party	Candidate	Votes	%	±%
INC	Pidathala Ranga Reddy	21,469	62.12%	
CPI	Thupakula Basavayya	13,092	37.88%	
Margin of victory		8,377	24.24%	
Turnout		34,561	66.15%	
Registered electors		52,245		
INC win (new seat)				

== See also ==
- List of constituencies of Andhra Pradesh Legislative Assembly
