= Pidathala Ranga Reddy =

Indian politician (1917–1991)

Pidathala Ranga Reddy (1917 – 1991) was an Indian politician from Andhra Pradesh. He was a five time Member of the Legislative Assembly (MLA) from Giddalur Assembly Constituency in the erstwhile Nellore and Prakasam district.

== Career ==
Reddy was a senior Congressman and was a freedom fighter. He participated in individual satyagraha in 1940 and took part in the Quit India Movement in 1942. He was first elected to the provisional parliament in 1950. He was made the Chief Whip of the Congress Legislature Party in Madras Assembly. Later, he was also a Chief Whip in the Andhra Pradesh Assembly and the Speaker of the AP Assembly from March 1972 to September 11974. He was the Minister for Planning and Information in the Andhra Pradesh Government from 1960 to 1962.

In Andhra Pradesh, he was first elected as an MLA from Giddalur Assembly constituency in 1955, representing the Indian National Congress and won for three consecutive terms in 1967, 1972 and 1978, the last one on Janata Party ticket. He lost the 1983 election, but regained the seat in 1985 contesting as an independent candidate, his final term in the assembly.

In 1970s, when the Congress party split, he opposed supporting Indira Gandhi.
