= Pagadala Ramaiah =

Indian politician

Pagadala Ramaiah (1981 – 2018) was an Indian politician from Andhra Pradesh. He was an MLA of Indian National Congress from Giddalur Assembly constituency in the erstwhile Prakasam district. He won the 2004 Andhra Pradesh Legislative Assembly election.

== Early life ==
Ramaiah was from Chinnaganipalle village in Racharla mandal of Prakasam district (now Markapuram district).

== Career ==
Ramaiah started his political life as a village sarpanch and was the president of the District Congress Party for 12 years and was also the secretary of the Pradesh Congress Committee.

In the 2004 Andhra Pradesh Legislative Assembly election, he contested on the Indian National Congress ticket and won from Giddalur. He polled 50,987 votes and defeated Pidathala Sai Kalpana of the Telugu Desam party who polled 31,505 votes.

After a brief illness, he died at Nizam's Institute of Medical Sciences, Hyderabad on 20 February 2018.
