= Andhra Pradesh Legislative Assembly =

Lower house of the Andhra Pradesh Legislature

Andhra Pradesh Legislative Assembly Āndhra Pradēś Śāsana Sabha
- 16th Andhra Pradesh Assembly

Type
- Type: Lower house of the Andhra Pradesh Legislature
- Term limits: 5 years

History
- Founded: 3 December 1956 (69 years ago)
- Preceded by: Andhra State Legislative Assembly

Leadership
- Governor: Syed Abdul Nazeer since 24 February 2023
- Speaker: Chintakayala Ayyanna Patrudu, TDP since 22 June 2024
- Deputy Speaker: Raghu Rama Krishna Raju, TDP since 14 November 2024
- Leader of the House (Chief Minister): N. Chandrababu Naidu, TDP since 12 June 2024
- Minister of Legislative Affairs: Payyavula Keshav, TDP since 12 June 2024
- Leader of the opposition: Vacant (Note: No party secured 10% of seats to claim post of leader of the opposition.)
- Secretary General: Suryadevara Prasanna Kumar since 15 July 2024

Structure
- Seats: 175
- Political groups: Government (164) Kutami (164): TDP (135); JSP (21); BJP (8); Opposition (11): YSRCP (11)
- Length of term: 5 years

Elections
- Voting system: First past the post
- First election: 11 February 1955
- Last election: 13 May 2024
- Next election: April / May 2029

Meeting place
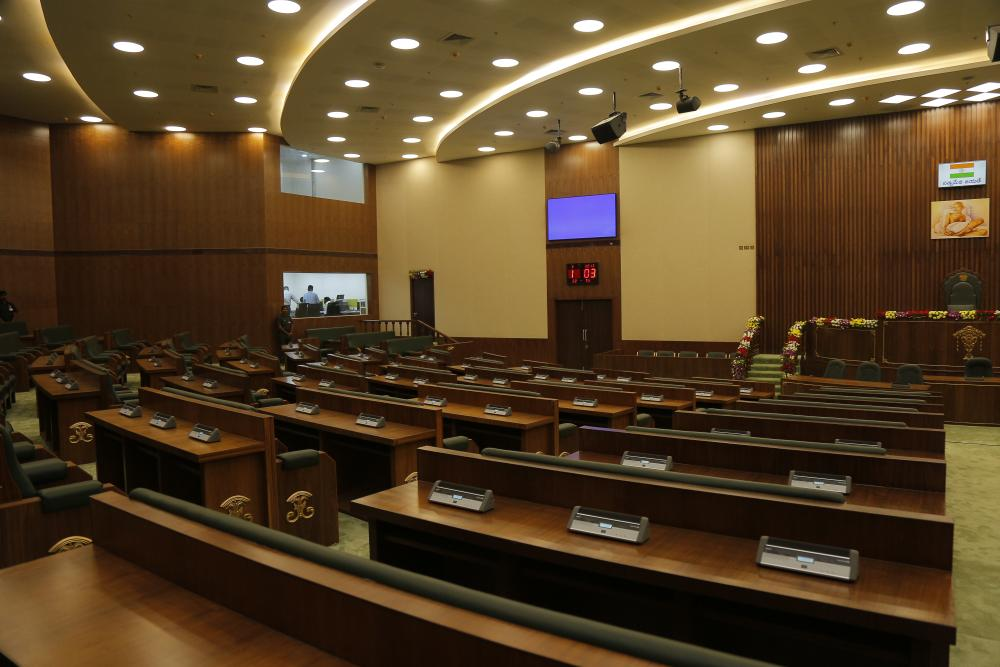
- Assembly Chamber, Amaravati, Andhra Pradesh, India

Website
- Andhra Pradesh Legislative Assembly

The Andhra Pradesh Legislative Assembly (ISO: Āndhra Pradēś Śāsana Sabha) is the lower house of the bicameral legislature of the Indian state Andhra Pradesh.

The Legislative Assembly consists of 175 members who are elected by adult universal suffrage under the first-past-the-post system. The duration of the Assembly is five years from the date appointed for its first meeting unless it is decided to dissolve the Assembly sooner. The Legislative Assembly's main functions include legislation, overseeing of administration, passing the budget, and airing public grievances.

The Legislative Assembly holds three sessions annually, one for Budget and the other for Monsoon and Winter sessions.

The Legislative Assembly took up residence in the interim Legislative Assembly Building in Amaravati beginning from the 2017 Budget session. The new building has systems for automatic speech translation and automatic vote recording.

== History ==
The Andhra Legislative Assembly was constituted after the formation of Andhra State on 1 October 1953. When Andhra Pradesh was formed on 1 November 1956 by merging Andhra State with the Telugu-speaking areas of Hyderabad State, the 140 Members of the Andhra State Legislative Assembly and 105 Members representing the Telugu-speaking areas of Hyderabad State merged to form APLA. At the time of formation, the Legislature was unicameral with only an Assembly with 301 Members. The first meeting was held on 3 December 1956. Sri Ayyadevara Kaleswara Rao and Palasa Surya Chandra Rao were the first Speaker and the first Deputy Speaker, respectively.

With the formation of the Legislative Council on 1 July 1958, the Andhra Pradesh Legislature became bicameral and remained so until 1 June 1985 when the Legislative Council was dissolved on 31 May 1985 during the period of the Eighth Legislative Assembly and the state legislature once again became unicameral.

On 2 June 2014, the state of Andhra Pradesh was split to form the new state of Telangana. Andhra Pradesh was allocated 175 legislative seats with the remaining 119 allocated to Telangana Legislative Assembly.

The 2019 election was held on 11 April 2019, the YSR Congress Party won 151 seats and the Telugu Desam Party bagged 23 seats. Janasena Party won one seat. The 2024 election was held 13 May 2024, the Kutami alliance won a 164 seats, whilst the YSR Congress Party won 11 seats.

== Presiding officers ==
Designation	Portrait	Name
Governor		Syed Abdul Nazeer
Speaker		Chintakayala Ayyanna Patrudu (TDP)
Deputy Speaker		Raghu Rama Krishna Raju (TDP)
Leader of the House		N. Chandrababu Naidu (TDP)
Leader of the Opposition		None

== Electoral history ==
=== Andhra State (1953–1956) ===
Years							Total
Years	INC	KLP	CPI	PSP	KMPP	IND	Total
1955	119	22	15	13	5	22	196

=== Andhra Pradesh (1956–2014) ===
Year							Total
Year	TDP	INC	BJP	LFT	IND	OTH	Total
1957	–	187	–	37	34	43	301
1962	–	177	–	51	21	51	300
1967	–	165	–	20	68	34	287
1972	–	219	–	8	57	3	287
1978	–	175	–	14	15	90	294
1983	201	60	3	9	19	2	294
1985	202	50	8	22	9	3	294
1989	74	181	5	14	15	5	294
1994	216	26	3	34	12	3	294
1999	180	91	12	2	5	4	294
2004	47	185	2	15	11	34 (Note: Telangana Rashtra Samithi bagged 26 seats as part of the United Progressive Alliance)	294
2009	92	156	2	5	3	36	294

=== Andhra Pradesh (since 2014) ===
Year							Total
Year	TDP	YCP	JSP	BJP	IND	OTH	Total
2014	102	67	– (Note: Janasena Party did not contest and extended its support to the National Democratic Alliance)	4	1	1	175
2019	23	151	1	0	0	0	175
2024	135	11	21	8	0	0	175

== List of the assemblies ==
=== 1953–1956 ===
Year	Election	Chief Minister	Party	Party-wise seats details	Opposition Leader
1952	First Assembly	Tanguturi Prakasam	(Congress)	Total: 196. Congress: 119; CPI: 15, Independents: 8	Tarimela Nagi Reddy
1955	First Assembly	Bezawada Gopala Reddy	(Congress)	Total: 196. Congress: 119; CPI: 15, Independents: 8	Tarimela Nagi Reddy

=== Since 1956 ===
Assembly (Election)	Chief Minister	Party	Deputy Chief Minister	Speaker	Deputy Speaker	Leader of the House	Leader of the Opposition
1st (1955)	Neelam Sanjiva Reddy	Indian National Congress	Vacant	Ayyadevara Kaleswara Rao	Kalluru Subba Rao	Neelam Sanjiva Reddy	Puchalapalli Sundarayya
2nd (1957)	Neelam Sanjiva Reddy Damodaram Sanjivayya	Indian National Congress	Vacant Konda Venkata Ranga Reddy	Ayyadevara Kaleswara Rao	Konda Laxman Bapuji T. N. Sadalakshmi	Neelam Sanjiva Reddy Damodaram Sanjivayya	Puchalapalli Sundarayya
3rd (1962)	Neelam Sanjiva Reddy Kasu Brahmananda Reddy	Indian National Congress	Vacant	B. V. Subba Reddy	Vasudev Krishnaji Naik	Neelam Sanjiva Reddy Kasu Brahmananda Reddy	Tarimela Nagi Reddy
4th (1967)	Kasu Brahmananda Reddy Pamulaparthi Venkata Narasimha Rao	Indian National Congress	Joginapally Venkat Narsing Rao	B. V. Subba Reddy K. V. Vema Reddy	Vasudev Krishnaji Naik	Kasu Brahmananda Reddy Pamulaparthi Venkata Narasimha Rao	Gouthu Latchanna Nukala Ramachandra Reddy
5th (1972)	Pamulaparthi Venkata Narasimha Rao Jalagam Vengala Rao	Indian National Congress (Requisitionists)	Vacant	Pidatala Ranga Reddy R. Dasaratha Rami Reddy	C. Jagannadha Rao Syed Rahmat Ali	Pamulaparthi Venkata Narasimha Rao Jalagam Vengala Rao	Nukala Ramachandra Reddy
6th (1978)	Marri Chenna Reddy Tanguturi Anjaiah MLC Bhavanam Venkatarami Reddy MLC Kotla Vijaya Bhaskara Reddy	Indian National Congress (Indira)	Vacant Vacant Chowti Jagannatha Rao Vacant	Divi Kondaiah Chowdary Kona Prabhakara Rao Agarala Eswar Reddy	Kona Prabhakara Rao Agarala Eswara Reddi Ireni Lingaiah	Marri Chenna Reddy Kotla Vijaya Bhaskara Reddy	Gouthu Latchanna
7th (1983)	Nandamuri Taraka Rama Rao Nadendla Bhaskara Rao Nandamuri Taraka Rama Rao	Telugu Desam Party	Vacant	Tangi Satyanarayana Nissanakararao Venkatratnam	A. Bheem Reddy Vacant	Nandamuri Taraka Rama Rao Nadendla Bhaskara Rao Nandamuri Taraka Rama Rao	Mogaligundla Baga Reddy
8th (1985)	Nandamuri Taraka Rama Rao	Telugu Desam Party	Vacant	G. Narayana Rao	Alluri Venkata Suryanarayana Raju	Nandamuri Taraka Rama Rao	Mogaligundla Baga Reddy
9th (1989)	Marri Chenna Reddy Nedurumalli Janardhana Reddy Kotla Vijaya Bhaskara Reddy	Indian National Congress (Indira)	Vacant Vacant Koneru Ranga Rao	P. Ramachandra Reddy D. Sripada Rao	Alapati Dharma Rao Buragadda Vedavyas	Marri Chenna Reddy Nedurumalli Janardhana Reddy Kotla Vijaya Bhaskara Reddy	Nandamuri Taraka Rama Rao
10th (1994)	Nandamuri Taraka Rama Rao Nara Chandrababu Naidu	Telugu Desam Party	Vacant	Yanamala Rama Krishnudu	N. M. D. Farooq	Nandamuri Taraka Rama Rao Nara Chandrababu Naidu	Vacant
11th (1999)	Nara Chandrababu Naidu	Telugu Desam Party	Vacant	K. Pratibha Bharati	K. Chandrashekar Rao Koppula Harishwar Reddy	Nara Chandrababu Naidu	Yeduguri Sandinti Rajasekhara Reddy
12th (2004)	Yeduguri Sandinti Rajasekhara Reddy	Indian National Congress	Vacant	K. R. Suresh Reddy	Gummadi Kuthuhalamma	Yeduguri Sandinti Rajasekhara Reddy	Nara Chandrababu Naidu
13th (2009)	Yeduguri Sandinti Rajasekhara Reddy Konijeti Rosaiah MLC Nallari Kiran Kumar Reddy	Indian National Congress	Vacant Vacant Damodar Raja Narasimha	Nallari Kiran Kumar Reddy Nadendla Manohar	Nadendla Manohar Mallu Bhatti Vikramarka	Yeduguri Sandinti Rajasekhara Reddy Nallari Kiran Kumar Reddy	Nara Chandrababu Naidu
14th (2014)	Nara Chandrababu Naidu	Telugu Desam Party	Nimmakayala Chinarajappa K. E. Krishna Murthy	Kodela Siva Prasada Rao	Mandali Buddha Prasad	Nara Chandrababu Naidu	Y. S. Jagan Mohan Reddy
15th (2019)	Y. S. Jagan Mohan Reddy	Yuvajana Sramika Rythu Congress Party	Alla Kali Krishna Srinivas Amzath Basha Shaik Bepari Kalattur Narayana Swamy Pilli Subhash Chandra Bose Pamula Pushpa Sreevani Dharmana Krishna Das Amzath Basha Shaik Bepari Budi Mutyala Naidu Kalattur Narayana Swamy Kottu Satyanarayana Peedika Rajanna Dora	Thammineni Seetharam	Kona Raghupathi Kolagatla Veerabhadra Swamy	Y. S. Jagan Mohan Reddy	Nara Chandrababu Naidu
16th (2024)	Nara Chandrababu Naidu	Telugu Desam Party	Konidala Pawan Kalyan	Chintakayala Ayyanna Patrudu	Raghu Rama Krishna Raju	Nara Chandrababu Naidu	Vacant (Note: No official opposition because no political party obtained at least 10% of the seats in the following assembly election)

== Composition ==
Alliance	Political party	No. of MLAs	Floor Leader
Government; Kutami; Seats: 164	Telugu Desam Party	135	N. Chandrababu Naidu (Chief Minister)
Government; Kutami; Seats: 164	Janasena Party	21	Pawan Kalyan (Deputy Chief Minister)
Government; Kutami; Seats: 164	Bharatiya Janata Party	8	P. Vishnu Kumar Raju
Opposition; None; Seats: 0	Vacant		
Others; Seats: 11	YSR Congress Party	11	Y. S. Jagan Mohan Reddy
Total		175	

== Members of Legislative Assembly ==
District	No.	Constituency	Name	Party	Alliance	Remarks
Srikakulam	1	Ichchapuram	Ashok Bendalam	TDP	NDA	Whip
Srikakulam	2	Palasa	Gouthu Sireesha	TDP	NDA	
Srikakulam	3	Tekkali	Kinjarapu Atchannaidu	TDP	NDA	Minister of Agriculture, Co-operation, Marketing, Animal Husbandry, Dairy development & Fisheries
Srikakulam	4	Pathapatnam	Mamidi Govinda Rao	TDP	NDA	
Srikakulam	5	Srikakulam	Gondu Shankar	TDP	NDA	
Srikakulam	6	Amadalavalasa	Koona Ravi Kumar	TDP	NDA	
Srikakulam	7	Etcherla	Nadukuditi Eswara Rao	BJP	NDA	
Srikakulam	8	Narasannapeta	Baggu Ramanamurthy	TDP	NDA	
Vizianagaram	9	Rajam (SC)	Kondru Murali Mohan	TDP	NDA	
Parvathipuram Manyam	10	Palakonda (ST)	Nimmaka Jaya Krishna	JSP	NDA	
Parvathipuram Manyam	11	Kurupam (ST)	Jagadeeswari Thoyaka	TDP	NDA	Whip
Parvathipuram Manyam	12	Parvathipuram (SC)	Bonela Vijaya Chandra	TDP	NDA	
Parvathipuram Manyam	13	Salur (ST)	Gummadi Sandhya Rani	TDP	NDA	Minister of Women & Child Welfare, Tribal Welfare
Vizianagaram	14	Bobbili	R. V. S. K. K. Ranga Rao	TDP	NDA	
Vizianagaram	15	Cheepurupalli	Kimidi Kalavenkata Rao	TDP	NDA	
Vizianagaram	16	Gajapathinagaram	Kondapalli Srinivas	TDP	NDA	Minister of MSME, SERP, NRI Empowerment and Relations
Vizianagaram	17	Nellimarla	Lokam Naga Madhavi	JSP	NDA	
Vizianagaram	18	Vizianagaram	Pusapati Aditi Vijayalakshmi	TDP	NDA	
Vizianagaram	19	Srungavarapukota	Kolla Lalitha Kumari	TDP	NDA	
Visakhapatnam	20	Bhimili	Ganta Srinivasa Rao	TDP	NDA	
Visakhapatnam	21	Visakhapatnam East	Velagapudi Ramakrishna Babu	TDP	NDA	
Visakhapatnam	22	Visakhapatnam South	Vamsi Krishna Srinivasa Yadav	JSP	NDA	
Visakhapatnam	23	Visakhapatnam North	Penmetsa Vishnu Kumar Raju	BJP	NDA	BJP Floor Leader
Visakhapatnam	24	Visakhapatnam West	P. G. V. R. Naidu	TDP	NDA	Whip
Visakhapatnam	25	Gajuwaka	Palla Srinivasa Rao	TDP	NDA	President of Telugu Desam Party
Anakapalli	26	Chodavaram	Kalidindi Suryana Naga Sanyasi Raju	TDP	NDA	
Anakapalli	27	Madugula	Bandaru Satyanarayana Murthy	TDP	NDA	
Alluri Sitharama Raju	28	Araku Valley (ST)	Regam Matyalingam	YSRCP	None	
Alluri Sitharama Raju	29	Paderu (ST)	Matsyarasa Visweswara Raju	YSRCP	None	
Anakapalli	30	Anakapalli	Konathala Ramakrishna	JSP	NDA	
Visakhapatnam	31	Pendurthi	Panchakarla Ramesh Babu	JSP	NDA	
Anakapalli	32	Yelamanchili	Sundarapu Vijay Kumar	JSP	NDA	
Anakapalli	33	Payakaraopet (SC)	Vangalapudi Anitha	TDP	NDA	Minister of Home & Disaster Management
Anakapalli	34	Narsipatnam	Chintakayala Ayyannapatrudu	TDP	NDA	Speaker of the Andhra Pradesh Legislative Assembly
Kakinada	35	Tuni	Yanamala Divya	TDP	NDA	Whip
Kakinada	36	Prathipadu (Kakinada)	Varapula Sathyaprabha	TDP	NDA	
Kakinada	37	Pithapuram	Konidela Pawan Kalyan	JSP	NDA	Deputy Chief Minister of Andhra Pradesh; Minister of Panchayat Raj, Rural Development & Rural Water Supply, Environment, Forest, Science and Technology; Founder and President of Janasena Party; JSP Floor Leader
Kakinada	38	Kakinada Rural	Pantham Venkateswara Rao	JSP	NDA	
Kakinada	39	Peddapuram	Nimmakayala Chinarajappa	TDP	NDA	
East Godavari	40	Anaparthy	Ramakrishna Reddy Nallamilli	BJP	NDA	
Kakinada	41	Kakinada City	Vanamadi Venkateswara Rao	TDP	NDA	
Konaseema	42	Ramachandrapuram	Vasamsetti Subhash	TDP	NDA	Minister of Labour, Factories, Boilers & Insurance Medical Services
Konaseema	43	Mummidivaram	Datla Subbaraju	TDP	NDA	Whip
Konaseema	44	Amalapuram (SC)	Aithabathula Anandarao	TDP	NDA	
Konaseema	45	Razole (SC)	Deva Varaprasad	JSP	NDA	
Konaseema	46	Gannavaram (Konaseema) (SC)	Giddi Satyanarayana	JSP	NDA	
Konaseema	47	Kothapeta	Bandaru Satyananda Rao	TDP	NDA	
Konaseema	48	Mandapeta	V. Jogeswara Rao	TDP	NDA	
East Godavari	49	Rajanagaram	Bathula Balaramakrishna	JSP	NDA	
East Godavari	50	Rajahmundry City	Adireddy Srinivas	TDP	NDA	
East Godavari	51	Rajahmundry Rural	Gorantla Butchaiah Chowdary	TDP	NDA	
Kakinada	52	Jaggampeta	Jyothula Nehru	TDP	NDA	
Alluri Sitharama Raju	53	Rampachodavaram (ST)	Miriyala Sirisha Devi	TDP	NDA	
East Godavari	54	Kovvur (SC)	Muppidi Venkateswara Rao	TDP	NDA	
East Godavari	55	Nidadavole	Kandula Durgesh	JSP	NDA	Minister of Tourism & Culture, Cinematography
West Godavari	56	Achanta	Satyanarayana Pithani	TDP	NDA	
West Godavari	57	Palakollu	Nimmala Rama Naidu	TDP	NDA	Minister of Water Resources Development
West Godavari	58	Narasapuram	Bommidi Narayana Nayakar	JSP	NDA	Whip
West Godavari	59	Bhimavaram	Pulaparthi Ramanjaneyulu	JSP	NDA	
West Godavari	60	Undi	Raghu Rama Krishna Raju	TDP	NDA	Deputy Speaker
West Godavari	61	Tanuku	Arimilli Radha Krishna	TDP	NDA	
West Godavari	62	Tadepalligudem	Bolisetti Srinivas	JSP	NDA	Whip
Eluru	63	Unguturu	Dharmaraju Patsamatla	JSP	NDA	
Eluru	64	Denduluru	Chintamaneni Prabhakar	TDP	NDA	
Eluru	65	Eluru	Radha Krishnayya Badeti	TDP	NDA	
East Godavari	66	Gopalapuram (SC)	Maddipati Venkata Raju	TDP	NDA	
Eluru	67	Polavaram (ST)	Chirri Balaraju	JSP	NDA	
Eluru	68	Chintalapudi (SC)	Roshan Kumar Songa	TDP	NDA	
NTR	69	Tiruvuru (SC)	Kolikapudi Srinivasa Rao	TDP	NDA	
Eluru	70	Nuzvid	Kolusu Parthasarathy	TDP	NDA	Minister of Housing, Information & Public Relations
Krishna	71	Gannavaram (Krishna)	Yarlagadda Venkata Rao	TDP	NDA	Whip
Krishna	72	Gudivada	Venigandla Ramu	TDP	NDA	
Eluru	73	Kaikalur	Kamineni Srinivas	BJP	NDA	
Krishna	74	Pedana	Kagitha Krishna Prasad	TDP	NDA	
Krishna	75	Machilipatnam	Kollu Ravindra	TDP	NDA	Minister of Mines & Geology, Excise
Krishna	76	Avanigadda	Mandali Buddha Prasad	JSP	NDA	
Krishna	77	Pamarru (SC)	Varla Kumar Raja	TDP	NDA	
Krishna	78	Penamaluru	Bode Prasad	TDP	NDA	
NTR	79	Vijayawada West	Sujana Chowdary	BJP	NDA	
NTR	80	Vijayawada Central	Bonda Umamaheswara Rao	TDP	NDA	Whip
NTR	81	Vijayawada East	Gadde Ramamohan	TDP	NDA	
NTR	82	Mylavaram	Vasantha Venkata Krishna Prasad	TDP	NDA	
NTR	83	Nandigama (SC)	Tangirala Sowmya	TDP	NDA	Whip
NTR	84	Jaggayyapeta	Rajagopal Sreeram	TDP	NDA	
Palnadu	85	Pedakurapadu	Bhashyam Praveen	TDP	NDA	
Guntur	86	Tadikonda (SC)	Tenali Sravan Kumar	TDP	NDA	
Guntur	87	Mangalagiri	Nara Lokesh	TDP	NDA	Minister of Human Resources Development, Information Technology, Electronics & Communication, Real Time Governance; National Working President of Telugu Desam Party
Guntur	88	Ponnuru	Dhulipalla Narendra Kumar	TDP	NDA	
Bapatla	89	Vemuru (SC)	Nakka Ananda Babu	TDP	NDA	
Bapatla	90	Repalle	Anagani Satya Prasad	TDP	NDA	Minister of Revenue, Registration & Stamps
Guntur	91	Tenali	Nadendla Manohar	JSP	NDA	Minister of Food & Civil Supplies, Consumer Affairs; Political Affairs Committee (PAC) Chairman of the Janasena Party; JSP Deputy Floor Leader
Bapatla	92	Bapatla	Vegesana Narendra Varma Raju	TDP	NDA	
Guntur	93	Prathipadu (Guntur) (SC)	Burla Ramanjaneyulu	TDP	NDA	
Guntur	94	Guntur West	Galla Madhavi	TDP	NDA	
Guntur	95	Guntur East	Mohammed Naseer Ahmed	TDP	NDA	
Palnadu	96	Chilakaluripet	Prathipati Pulla Rao	TDP	NDA	
Palnadu	97	Narasaraopet	Chadalavada Aravinda Babu	TDP	NDA	
Palnadu	98	Sattenapalle	Kanna Lakshminaraya	TDP	NDA	
Palnadu	99	Vinukonda	G. V. Anjaneyulu	TDP	NDA	Chief Whip
Palnadu	100	Gurazala	Yarapathineni Srinivasa Rao	TDP	NDA	
Palnadu	101	Macherla	Julakanti Brahmananda Reddy	TDP	NDA	
Prakasam	102	Yerragondapalem (SC)	Tatiparthi Chandrasekhar	YSRCP	None	
Prakasam	103	Darsi	Buchepalli Siva Prasad Reddy	YSRCP	None	
Bapatla	104	Parchur	Yeluri Sambasiva Rao	TDP	NDA	
Bapatla	105	Addanki	Gottipati Ravi Kumar	TDP	NDA	Minister of Energy
Bapatla	106	Chirala	Madduluri Malakondaiah Yadav	TDP	NDA	
Prakasam	107	Santhanuthalapadu (SC)	B. N. Vijay Kumar	TDP	NDA	
Prakasam	108	Ongole	Damacharla Janardhana Rao	TDP	NDA	
Nellore	109	Kandukur	Inturi Nageswara Rao	TDP	NDA	
Prakasam	110	Kondapi (SC)	Dola Sree Bala Veeranjaneya Swamy	TDP	NDA	Minister of Social Welfare, Disabled & Senior Citizen Welfare, Affairs of Sachivalayam & Village Volunteer
Prakasam	111	Markapuram	Kandula Narayana Reddy	TDP	NDA	
Prakasam	112	Giddalur	Muthumula Ashok Reddy	TDP	NDA	
Prakasam	113	Kanigiri	Mukku Ugra Narasimha Reddy	TDP	NDA	
Nellore	114	Kavali	Dagumati Venkata Krishna Reddy	TDP	NDA	
Nellore	115	Atmakur	Anam Ramanarayana Reddy	TDP	NDA	Minister of Endowments
Nellore	116	Kovur	Vemireddy Prashanti Reddy	TDP	NDA	
Nellore	117	Nellore City	Ponguru Narayana	TDP	NDA	Minister of Urban Development & Municipal Administration
Nellore	118	Nellore Rural	Kotamreddy Sridhar Reddy	TDP	NDA	
Nellore	119	Sarvepalli	Somireddy Chandra Mohan Reddy	TDP	NDA	
Tirupati	120	Gudur (SC)	Pasam Sunil Kumar	TDP	NDA	
Tirupati	121	Sullurpeta (SC)	Nelavala Vijayasree	TDP	NDA	
Tirupati	122	Venkatagiri	Kurugondla Ramakrishna	TDP	NDA	
Nellore	123	Udayagiri	Kakarla Suresh	TDP	NDA	
YSR Kadapa	124	Badvel (SC)	Dasari Sudha	YSRCP	None	
Annamayya	125	Rajampet	Akepati Amarnath Reddy	YSRCP	None	
YSR Kadapa	126	Kadapa	Reddeppagari Madhavi	TDP	NDA	Whip
Annamayya	127	Kodur (SC)	Arava Sreedhar	JSP	NDA	Whip
Annamayya	128	Rayachoti	Mandipalli Ramprasad Reddy	TDP	NDA	Minister of Transport, Youth & Sports
YSR Kadapa	129	Pulivendula	Y. S. Jagan Mohan Reddy	YSRCP	None	President of YSR Congress Party, YSRCP Floor Leader
YSR Kadapa	130	Kamalapuram	Putha Krishna Chaitanya Reddy	TDP	NDA	
YSR Kadapa	131	Jammalamadugu	Ch. Adinarayana Reddy	BJP	NDA	BJP Whip
YSR Kadapa	132	Proddatur	Nandyala Varada Rajula Reddy	TDP	NDA	
YSR Kadapa	133	Mydukur	Putta Sudhakar Yadav	TDP	NDA	
Nandyal	134	Allagadda	Bhuma Akhila Priya	TDP	NDA	
Nandyal	135	Srisailam	Budda Rajasekhar Reddy	TDP	NDA	
Nandyal	136	Nandikotkur (SC)	Githa Jayasurya	TDP	NDA	
Kurnool	137	Kurnool	T. G. Bharath	TDP	NDA	Minister of Industries & Commerce, Food Processing
Kurnool	138	Panyam	Gowru Charitha Reddy	TDP	NDA	
Nandyal	139	Nandyal	N. M. D. Farooq	TDP	NDA	Minister of Minority Welfare, Law & Justice
Nandyal	140	Banaganapalle	B. C. Janardhan Reddy	TDP	NDA	Minister of Roads & Buildings, Infrastructure & Investments
Nandyal	141	Dhone	Kotla Jayasurya Prakasha Reddy	TDP	NDA	
Kurnool	142	Pattikonda	K. E. Shyam Babu	TDP	NDA	
Kurnool	143	Kodumur (SC)	Boggula Dastagiri	TDP	NDA	
Kurnool	144	Yemmiganur	Jaya Nageswara Reddy	TDP	NDA	
Kurnool	145	Mantralayam	Y. Balanagi Reddy	YSRCP	None	
Kurnool	146	Adoni	P. V. Parthasarathi	BJP	NDA	
Kurnool	147	Alur	Busine Virupakshi	YSRCP	None	
Anantapur	148	Rayadurg	Kalava Srinivasulu	TDP	NDA	Whip
Anantapur	149	Uravakonda	Payyavula Keshav	TDP	NDA	Minister of Finance, Planning, Commercial Taxes & Legislative Affairs
Anantapur	150	Guntakal	Gummanur Jayaram	TDP	NDA	
Anantapur	151	Tadipatri	J. C. Ashmit Reddy	TDP	NDA	
Anantapur	152	Singanamala (SC)	Bandaru Sravani Sree	TDP	NDA	
Anantapur	153	Anantapur Urban	Daggupati Venkateswara Prasad	TDP	NDA	
Anantapur	154	Kalyandurg	Amilineni Surendra Babu	TDP	NDA	
Anantapur	155	Raptadu	Paritala Sunitha	TDP	NDA	
Sri Sathya Sai	156	Madakasira (SC)	M. S. Raju	TDP	NDA	
Sri Sathya Sai	157	Hindupur	Nandamuri Balakrishna	TDP	NDA	
Sri Sathya Sai	158	Penukonda	S. Savitha	TDP	NDA	Minister of B.C. Welfare, Economically Weaker Sections Welfare, Handlooms & Textiles
Sri Sathya Sai	159	Puttaparthi	Palle Sindhura Reddy	TDP	NDA	
Sri Sathya Sai	160	Dharmavaram	Satya Kumar Yadav	BJP	NDA	Minister of Health & Family Welfare, Medical Education
Sri Sathya Sai	161	Kadiri	Kandikunta Venkata Prasad	TDP	NDA	
Annamayya	162	Thamballapalle	Peddireddy Dwarakanatha Reddy	YSRCP	None	
Annamayya	163	Pileru	Nallari Kishore Kumar Reddy	TDP	NDA	
Annamayya	164	Madanapalle	Shahjahan Basha	TDP	NDA	
Chittoor	165	Punganur	Peddireddy Ramachandra Reddy	YSRCP	None	
Tirupati	166	Chandragiri	Pulivarthi Venkata Mani Prasad	TDP	NDA	
Tirupati	167	Tirupati	Arani Srinivasulu	JSP	NDA	
Tirupati	168	Srikalahasti	Bojjala Venkata Sudhir Reddy	TDP	NDA	
Tirupati	169	Satyavedu (SC)	Koneti Adimulam	TDP	NDA	
Chittoor	170	Nagari	Gali Bhanu Prakash	TDP	NDA	
Chittoor	171	Gangadhara Nellore (SC)	V. M. Thomas	TDP	NDA	Whip
Chittoor	172	Chittoor	Gurajala Jagan Mohan	TDP	NDA	
Chittoor	173	Puthalapattu (SC)	Kalikiri Murali Mohan	TDP	NDA	
Chittoor	174	Palamaner	N. Amarnath Reddy	TDP	NDA	
Chittoor	175	Kuppam	N. Chandrababu Naidu	TDP	NDA	Chief Minister of Andhra Pradesh; National President of Telugu Desam Party

== See also ==
- Elections in Andhra Pradesh
- List of chief ministers of Andhra Pradesh
- Government of Andhra Pradesh
- Andhra Pradesh Legislative Council
- List of Assembly constituencies of Andhra Pradesh
