= Department of Disabled and Senior Citizen Welfare (Andhra Pradesh) =

Indian state government department

Minister of Disabled and Senior Citizen Welfare
- Vikalāṅgulu mariyu Vāyō Vr̥ddula Saṅkṣēma Śākha Mantrī
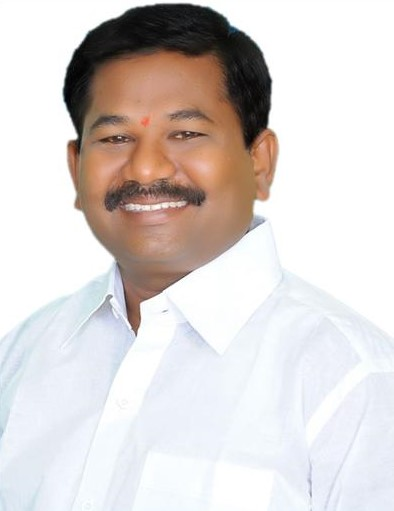
- Incumbent; Dola Sree Bala Veeranjaneya Swamy since 12 June 2024
- Department of Disabled and Senior Citizen Welfare
- Member of: Andha Pradesh Cabinet
- Reports to: Governor of Andhra Pradesh; Chief Minister of Andhra Pradesh; Andhra Pradesh Legislature
- Appointer: Governor of Andhra Pradesh on the advice of the chief minister of Andhra Pradesh
- Inaugural holder: Peethala Sujatha
- Formation: 8 June 2014
- Website: Official website

The Minister of Disabled and Senior Citizen Welfare, is the head of the Department of Disabled & Senior Citizen Welfare of the Government of Andhra Pradesh.

The incumbent minister of disabled & senior citizen welfare is Dola Sree Bala Veeranjaneya Swamy from the Telugu Desam Party.

== List of ministers ==
#	Portrait	Minister (Lifespan) Constituency	Term of office			Election (Term)	Party	Ministry	Chief Minister	Ref.
#	Portrait	Minister (Lifespan) Constituency	Term start	Term end	Duration	Election (Term)	Party	Ministry	Chief Minister	Ref.
1		Peethala Sujatha (born 1973); MLA for Chintalapudi	8 June 2014	1 April 2017	2 years, 297 days	2014 (14th)	Telugu Desam Party	Naidu III	N. Chandrababu Naidu	
2		Paritala Sunitha (born 1970); MLA for Raptadu	2 April 2017	29 May 2019	2 years, 57 days	2014 (14th)	Telugu Desam Party	Naidu III	N. Chandrababu Naidu	
-		Y. S. Jagan Mohan Reddy (born 1972); MLA for Pulivendula (Chief Minister)	30 May 2019	7 April 2022	2 years, 312 days	2019 (15th)	YSR Congress Party	Jagan	Y. S. Jagan Mohan Reddy	
3		K. V. Ushashri Charan (born 1976); MLA for Kalyandurg	11 April 2022	11 June 2024	2 years, 61 days	2019 (15th)	YSR Congress Party	Jagan	Y. S. Jagan Mohan Reddy	
4		Dola Sree Bala Veeranjaneya Swamy (born 1971); MLA for Kondapi	12 June 2024	Incumbent	2 years, 87 days	2024 (16th)	Telugu Desam Party	Naidu IV	N. Chandrababu Naidu	
