= Peethala Sujatha =

Indian politician

Minister of Women and Child Welfare; Disabled and Senior Citizen Welfare Government of Andhra Pradesh
- In office 8 June 2014 – 1 April 2017
- Governor: E. S. L. Narasimhan
- Chief Minister: N. Chandrababu Naidu
- Preceded by: Vakiti Sunitha Laxma Reddy
- Succeeded by: Paritala Sunitha

Minister of Mines and Geology Government of Andhra Pradesh
- In office 8 June 2014 – 1 April 2017
- Governor: E. S. L. Narasimhan
- Chief Minister: N. Chandrababu Naidu
- Preceded by: Galla Aruna Kumari
- Succeeded by: R. V. Sujay Krishna Ranga Rao

Member of Legislative Assembly, Andhra Pradesh
- In office 2014–2019
- Preceded by: Maddala Rajesh Kumar
- Succeeded by: Vunnamatla Eliza
- Constituency: Chintalapudi
- In office 2004–2009
- Preceded by: Johar Mocharla
- Succeeded by: Pithani Satyanarayana
- Constituency: Achanta

Personal details
- Party: Telugu Desam Party

Peethala Sujatha (born 1974) is an Indian politician from Andhra Pradesh. She is a former two time member ot the Andhra Pradesh Legislative Assembly representing the Telugu Desam Party. She is a former minister of the women and child welfare; disabled and senior citizen welfare departments in the Third N. Chandrababu Naidu ministry.

== Early life and education ==
Sujatha is from Veeravasaram, West Godavari distirct, Andhra Pradesh. She married Vara Prasad. She completed her B.Sc. at Y.N Collage, Narasapuram which is affiliated to Andhra University from 1994 to 1997. Later, she obtained a B.Ed. from Immamuel Collage oF Education, Makavaripalem, Vizianagaram district in 2000. She declared assets worth Rs.43 lakhs in 2014 in her affidavit to the Election Commission of India.

== Career ==
Sujatha became an MLA for the first time winning the Achanta Assembly constituency which is reserved for the Scheduled Caste community in West Godavari district in 2004 Andhra Pradesh Legislative Assembly election. In 2004, she contested on the Telugu Desam Party ticket and polled 46,670 votes and defeated her nearest rival, Chellem Anand Prakash of the Indian National Congress, by a margin of 5,641 votes. She won from Chintalapudi Assembly constituency in 2014 Andhra Pradesh Legislative Assembly election also on TDP ticket. In 2014, she polled 1,05,417 votes and defeated her closest opponent Burla Devi Priya of the YSR Congress Party, by a margin of 15,164 votes. In 2026, she served as the chairperson of a corportation.
