= 16th Andhra Pradesh Assembly =

2024 Andhra Pradesh lower house

16th Legislative Assembly of Andhra Pradesh
←	15th
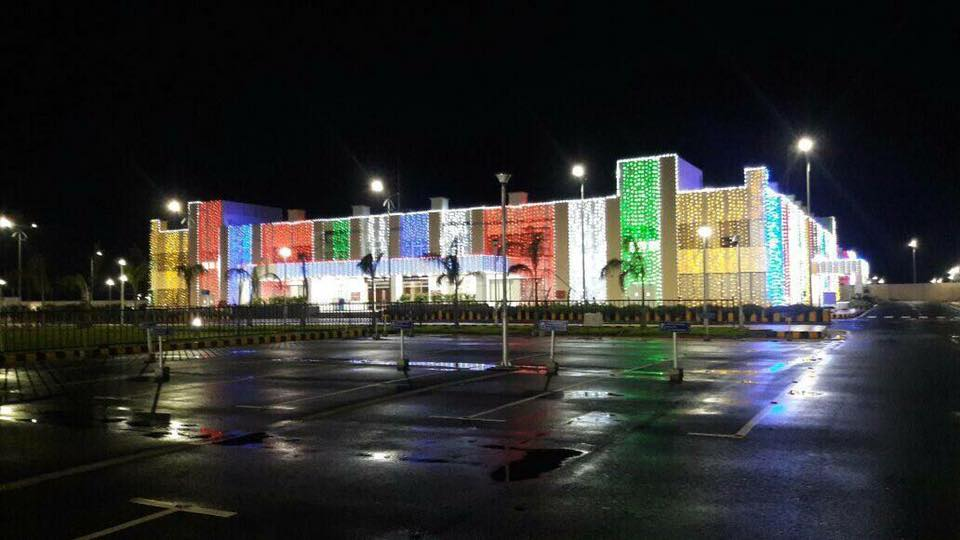
- Assembly Building, Amaravati, Andhra Pradesh, India

Overview
- Legislative body: Andhra Pradesh Legislature
- Term: 21 June 2024 –
- Election: 2024 Andhra Pradesh Legislative Assembly election
- Government: N. Chandrababu Naidu ministry
- Opposition: None
- Website: Andhra Pradesh Legislative Assembly

Nominal Executive
- Governor: Syed Abdul Nazeer

Andhra Pradesh Legislative Assembly
- Members: 175
- Speaker: Chintakayala Ayyanna Patrudu
- Deputy Speaker: Raghu Rama Krishna Raju
- Leader of the House: Nara Chandrababu Naidu
- Chief Minister: Nara Chandrababu Naidu
- Deputy Chief Minister: Konidala Pawan Kalyan
- Leader of the Opposition: Vacant
- Party control: Kutami

The Sixteenth Legislative Assembly of Andhra Pradesh was formed by the members elected in the 2024 Andhra Pradesh Legislative Assembly election. Election to Andhra Pradesh Legislative Assembly took place in a single phase on 13 May 2024 by the Election Commission of India. Counting started officially on the morning of 4 June 2024 and the results were declared on the same day.

== Presiding officers ==
Designation	Portrait	Name
Governor		Syed Abdul Nazeer
Speaker		Chintakayala Ayyanna Patrudu (TDP)
Deputy Speaker		Raghu Rama Krishna Raju (TDP)
Leader of the House		Nara Chandrababu Naidu (TDP)
Leader of the Opposition		N/A

=== Panel of speakers ===
Members of the Panel of Speakers for 2024–2029 term
Sl.no	Speaker	Party	Constituency	Term start	Term end	Appointed by
1.	Nandyala Varada Rajula Reddy	Telugu Desam Party	Proddatur	25 July 2024	Incumbent	Chintakayala Ayyanna Patrudu
2.	Jyothula Nehru	Telugu Desam Party	Jaggampeta	25 July 2024	Incumbent	Chintakayala Ayyanna Patrudu
3.	Kolla Lalitha Kumari	Telugu Desam Party	Srungavarapukota	25 July 2024	Incumbent	Chintakayala Ayyanna Patrudu
4.	Mandali Buddha Prasad	Janasena Party	Avanigadda	25 July 2024	Incumbent	Chintakayala Ayyanna Patrudu
5.	Dasari Sudha	YSR Congress Party	Badvel	25 July 2024	Incumbent	Chintakayala Ayyanna Patrudu
6.	Penmetsa Vishnu Kumar Raju	BJP	Visakhapatnam North	25 July 2024	Incumbent	Chintakayala Ayyanna Patrudu

== Composition ==
Alliance	Political party	No. of MLAs	Floor Leader
Government; Kutami; Seats: 164	Telugu Desam Party	135	N. Chandrababu Naidu (Chief Minister)
Government; Kutami; Seats: 164	Janasena Party	21	Pawan Kalyan (Deputy Chief Minister)
Government; Kutami; Seats: 164	Bharatiya Janata Party	8	P. Vishnu Kumar Raju
Opposition; None; Seats: 0	Vacant		
Others; Seats: 11	YSR Congress Party	11	Y. S. Jagan Mohan Reddy
Total		175	

== List of the Members of the Legislative Assembly ==
District	No.	Constituency	Name	Party	Alliance	Remarks
Srikakulam	1	Ichchapuram	Ashok Bendalam	TDP	NDA	Whip
Srikakulam	2	Palasa	Gouthu Sireesha	TDP	NDA	
Srikakulam	3	Tekkali	Kinjarapu Atchannaidu	TDP	NDA	Minister of Agriculture, Co-operation, Marketing, Animal Husbandry, Dairy development & Fisheries
Srikakulam	4	Pathapatnam	Mamidi Govinda Rao	TDP	NDA	
Srikakulam	5	Srikakulam	Gondu Shankar	TDP	NDA	
Srikakulam	6	Amadalavalasa	Koona Ravi Kumar	TDP	NDA	
Srikakulam	7	Etcherla	Nadukuditi Eswara Rao	BJP	NDA	
Srikakulam	8	Narasannapeta	Baggu Ramanamurthy	TDP	NDA	
Vizianagaram	9	Rajam (SC)	Kondru Murali Mohan	TDP	NDA	
Parvathipuram Manyam	10	Palakonda (ST)	Nimmaka Jaya Krishna	JSP	NDA	
Parvathipuram Manyam	11	Kurupam (ST)	Jagadeeswari Thoyaka	TDP	NDA	Whip
Parvathipuram Manyam	12	Parvathipuram (SC)	Bonela Vijaya Chandra	TDP	NDA	
Parvathipuram Manyam	13	Salur (ST)	Gummadi Sandhya Rani	TDP	NDA	Minister of Women & Child Welfare, Tribal Welfare
Vizianagaram	14	Bobbili	R. V. S. K. K. Ranga Rao	TDP	NDA	
Vizianagaram	15	Cheepurupalli	Kimidi Kalavenkata Rao	TDP	NDA	
Vizianagaram	16	Gajapathinagaram	Kondapalli Srinivas	TDP	NDA	Minister of MSME, SERP, NRI Empowerment and Relations
Vizianagaram	17	Nellimarla	Lokam Naga Madhavi	JSP	NDA	
Vizianagaram	18	Vizianagaram	Pusapati Aditi Vijayalakshmi	TDP	NDA	
Vizianagaram	19	Srungavarapukota	Kolla Lalitha Kumari	TDP	NDA	
Visakhapatnam	20	Bhimili	Ganta Srinivasa Rao	TDP	NDA	
Visakhapatnam	21	Visakhapatnam East	Velagapudi Ramakrishna Babu	TDP	NDA	
Visakhapatnam	22	Visakhapatnam South	Vamsi Krishna Srinivasa Yadav	JSP	NDA	
Visakhapatnam	23	Visakhapatnam North	Penmetsa Vishnu Kumar Raju	BJP	NDA	BJP Floor Leader
Visakhapatnam	24	Visakhapatnam West	P. G. V. R. Naidu	TDP	NDA	Whip
Visakhapatnam	25	Gajuwaka	Palla Srinivasa Rao	TDP	NDA	President of Telugu Desam Party
Anakapalli	26	Chodavaram	Kalidindi Suryana Naga Sanyasi Raju	TDP	NDA	
Anakapalli	27	Madugula	Bandaru Satyanarayana Murthy	TDP	NDA	
Alluri Sitharama Raju	28	Araku Valley (ST)	Regam Matyalingam	YSRCP	None	
Alluri Sitharama Raju	29	Paderu (ST)	Matsyarasa Visweswara Raju	YSRCP	None	
Anakapalli	30	Anakapalli	Konathala Ramakrishna	JSP	NDA	
Visakhapatnam	31	Pendurthi	Panchakarla Ramesh Babu	JSP	NDA	
Anakapalli	32	Yelamanchili	Sundarapu Vijay Kumar	JSP	NDA	
Anakapalli	33	Payakaraopet (SC)	Vangalapudi Anitha	TDP	NDA	Minister of Home & Disaster Management
Anakapalli	34	Narsipatnam	Chintakayala Ayyannapatrudu	TDP	NDA	Speaker of the Andhra Pradesh Legislative Assembly
Kakinada	35	Tuni	Yanamala Divya	TDP	NDA	Whip
Kakinada	36	Prathipadu (Kakinada)	Varapula Sathyaprabha	TDP	NDA	
Kakinada	37	Pithapuram	Konidela Pawan Kalyan	JSP	NDA	Deputy Chief Minister of Andhra Pradesh; Minister of Panchayat Raj, Rural Development & Rural Water Supply, Environment, Forest, Science and Technology; Founder and President of Janasena Party; JSP Floor Leader
Kakinada	38	Kakinada Rural	Pantham Venkateswara Rao	JSP	NDA	
Kakinada	39	Peddapuram	Nimmakayala Chinarajappa	TDP	NDA	
East Godavari	40	Anaparthy	Ramakrishna Reddy Nallamilli	BJP	NDA	
Kakinada	41	Kakinada City	Vanamadi Venkateswara Rao	TDP	NDA	
Konaseema	42	Ramachandrapuram	Vasamsetti Subhash	TDP	NDA	Minister of Labour, Factories, Boilers & Insurance Medical Services
Konaseema	43	Mummidivaram	Datla Subbaraju	TDP	NDA	Whip
Konaseema	44	Amalapuram (SC)	Aithabathula Anandarao	TDP	NDA	
Konaseema	45	Razole (SC)	Deva Varaprasad	JSP	NDA	
Konaseema	46	Gannavaram (Konaseema) (SC)	Giddi Satyanarayana	JSP	NDA	
Konaseema	47	Kothapeta	Bandaru Satyananda Rao	TDP	NDA	
Konaseema	48	Mandapeta	V. Jogeswara Rao	TDP	NDA	
East Godavari	49	Rajanagaram	Bathula Balaramakrishna	JSP	NDA	
East Godavari	50	Rajahmundry City	Adireddy Srinivas	TDP	NDA	
East Godavari	51	Rajahmundry Rural	Gorantla Butchaiah Chowdary	TDP	NDA	
Kakinada	52	Jaggampeta	Jyothula Nehru	TDP	NDA	
Alluri Sitharama Raju	53	Rampachodavaram (ST)	Miriyala Sirisha Devi	TDP	NDA	
East Godavari	54	Kovvur (SC)	Muppidi Venkateswara Rao	TDP	NDA	
East Godavari	55	Nidadavole	Kandula Durgesh	JSP	NDA	Minister of Tourism & Culture, Cinematography
West Godavari	56	Achanta	Satyanarayana Pithani	TDP	NDA	
West Godavari	57	Palakollu	Nimmala Rama Naidu	TDP	NDA	Minister of Water Resources Development
West Godavari	58	Narasapuram	Bommidi Narayana Nayakar	JSP	NDA	Whip
West Godavari	59	Bhimavaram	Pulaparthi Ramanjaneyulu	JSP	NDA	
West Godavari	60	Undi	Raghu Rama Krishna Raju	TDP	NDA	Deputy Speaker
West Godavari	61	Tanuku	Arimilli Radha Krishna	TDP	NDA	
West Godavari	62	Tadepalligudem	Bolisetti Srinivas	JSP	NDA	Whip
Eluru	63	Unguturu	Dharmaraju Patsamatla	JSP	NDA	
Eluru	64	Denduluru	Chintamaneni Prabhakar	TDP	NDA	
Eluru	65	Eluru	Radha Krishnayya Badeti	TDP	NDA	
East Godavari	66	Gopalapuram (SC)	Maddipati Venkata Raju	TDP	NDA	
Eluru	67	Polavaram (ST)	Chirri Balaraju	JSP	NDA	
Eluru	68	Chintalapudi (SC)	Roshan Kumar Songa	TDP	NDA	
NTR	69	Tiruvuru (SC)	Kolikapudi Srinivasa Rao	TDP	NDA	
Eluru	70	Nuzvid	Kolusu Parthasarathy	TDP	NDA	Minister of Housing, Information & Public Relations
Krishna	71	Gannavaram (Krishna)	Yarlagadda Venkata Rao	TDP	NDA	Whip
Krishna	72	Gudivada	Venigandla Ramu	TDP	NDA	
Eluru	73	Kaikalur	Kamineni Srinivas	BJP	NDA	
Krishna	74	Pedana	Kagitha Krishna Prasad	TDP	NDA	
Krishna	75	Machilipatnam	Kollu Ravindra	TDP	NDA	Minister of Mines & Geology, Excise
Krishna	76	Avanigadda	Mandali Buddha Prasad	JSP	NDA	
Krishna	77	Pamarru (SC)	Varla Kumar Raja	TDP	NDA	
Krishna	78	Penamaluru	Bode Prasad	TDP	NDA	
NTR	79	Vijayawada West	Sujana Chowdary	BJP	NDA	
NTR	80	Vijayawada Central	Bonda Umamaheswara Rao	TDP	NDA	Whip
NTR	81	Vijayawada East	Gadde Ramamohan	TDP	NDA	
NTR	82	Mylavaram	Vasantha Venkata Krishna Prasad	TDP	NDA	
NTR	83	Nandigama (SC)	Tangirala Sowmya	TDP	NDA	Whip
NTR	84	Jaggayyapeta	Rajagopal Sreeram	TDP	NDA	
Palnadu	85	Pedakurapadu	Bhashyam Praveen	TDP	NDA	
Guntur	86	Tadikonda (SC)	Tenali Sravan Kumar	TDP	NDA	
Guntur	87	Mangalagiri	Nara Lokesh	TDP	NDA	Minister of Human Resources Development, Information Technology, Electronics & Communication, Real Time Governance; National Working President of Telugu Desam Party
Guntur	88	Ponnuru	Dhulipalla Narendra Kumar	TDP	NDA	
Bapatla	89	Vemuru (SC)	Nakka Ananda Babu	TDP	NDA	
Bapatla	90	Repalle	Anagani Satya Prasad	TDP	NDA	Minister of Revenue, Registration & Stamps
Guntur	91	Tenali	Nadendla Manohar	JSP	NDA	Minister of Food & Civil Supplies, Consumer Affairs; Political Affairs Committee (PAC) Chairman of the Janasena Party; JSP Deputy Floor Leader
Bapatla	92	Bapatla	Vegesana Narendra Varma Raju	TDP	NDA	
Guntur	93	Prathipadu (Guntur) (SC)	Burla Ramanjaneyulu	TDP	NDA	
Guntur	94	Guntur West	Galla Madhavi	TDP	NDA	
Guntur	95	Guntur East	Mohammed Naseer Ahmed	TDP	NDA	
Palnadu	96	Chilakaluripet	Prathipati Pulla Rao	TDP	NDA	
Palnadu	97	Narasaraopet	Chadalavada Aravinda Babu	TDP	NDA	
Palnadu	98	Sattenapalle	Kanna Lakshminaraya	TDP	NDA	
Palnadu	99	Vinukonda	G. V. Anjaneyulu	TDP	NDA	Chief Whip
Palnadu	100	Gurazala	Yarapathineni Srinivasa Rao	TDP	NDA	
Palnadu	101	Macherla	Julakanti Brahmananda Reddy	TDP	NDA	
Prakasam	102	Yerragondapalem (SC)	Tatiparthi Chandrasekhar	YSRCP	None	
Prakasam	103	Darsi	Buchepalli Siva Prasad Reddy	YSRCP	None	
Bapatla	104	Parchur	Yeluri Sambasiva Rao	TDP	NDA	
Bapatla	105	Addanki	Gottipati Ravi Kumar	TDP	NDA	Minister of Energy
Bapatla	106	Chirala	Madduluri Malakondaiah Yadav	TDP	NDA	
Prakasam	107	Santhanuthalapadu (SC)	B. N. Vijay Kumar	TDP	NDA	
Prakasam	108	Ongole	Damacharla Janardhana Rao	TDP	NDA	
Nellore	109	Kandukur	Inturi Nageswara Rao	TDP	NDA	
Prakasam	110	Kondapi (SC)	Dola Sree Bala Veeranjaneya Swamy	TDP	NDA	Minister of Social Welfare, Disabled & Senior Citizen Welfare, Affairs of Sachivalayam & Village Volunteer
Prakasam	111	Markapuram	Kandula Narayana Reddy	TDP	NDA	
Prakasam	112	Giddalur	Muthumula Ashok Reddy	TDP	NDA	
Prakasam	113	Kanigiri	Mukku Ugra Narasimha Reddy	TDP	NDA	
Nellore	114	Kavali	Dagumati Venkata Krishna Reddy	TDP	NDA	
Nellore	115	Atmakur	Anam Ramanarayana Reddy	TDP	NDA	Minister of Endowments
Nellore	116	Kovur	Vemireddy Prashanti Reddy	TDP	NDA	
Nellore	117	Nellore City	Ponguru Narayana	TDP	NDA	Minister of Urban Development & Municipal Administration
Nellore	118	Nellore Rural	Kotamreddy Sridhar Reddy	TDP	NDA	
Nellore	119	Sarvepalli	Somireddy Chandra Mohan Reddy	TDP	NDA	
Tirupati	120	Gudur (SC)	Pasam Sunil Kumar	TDP	NDA	
Tirupati	121	Sullurpeta (SC)	Nelavala Vijayasree	TDP	NDA	
Tirupati	122	Venkatagiri	Kurugondla Ramakrishna	TDP	NDA	
Nellore	123	Udayagiri	Kakarla Suresh	TDP	NDA	
YSR Kadapa	124	Badvel (SC)	Dasari Sudha	YSRCP	None	
Annamayya	125	Rajampet	Akepati Amarnath Reddy	YSRCP	None	
YSR Kadapa	126	Kadapa	Reddeppagari Madhavi	TDP	NDA	Whip
Annamayya	127	Kodur (SC)	Arava Sreedhar	JSP	NDA	Whip
Annamayya	128	Rayachoti	Mandipalli Ramprasad Reddy	TDP	NDA	Minister of Transport, Youth & Sports
YSR Kadapa	129	Pulivendula	Y. S. Jagan Mohan Reddy	YSRCP	None	President of YSR Congress Party, YSRCP Floor Leader
YSR Kadapa	130	Kamalapuram	Putha Krishna Chaitanya Reddy	TDP	NDA	
YSR Kadapa	131	Jammalamadugu	Ch. Adinarayana Reddy	BJP	NDA	BJP Whip
YSR Kadapa	132	Proddatur	Nandyala Varada Rajula Reddy	TDP	NDA	
YSR Kadapa	133	Mydukur	Putta Sudhakar Yadav	TDP	NDA	
Nandyal	134	Allagadda	Bhuma Akhila Priya	TDP	NDA	
Nandyal	135	Srisailam	Budda Rajasekhar Reddy	TDP	NDA	
Nandyal	136	Nandikotkur (SC)	Githa Jayasurya	TDP	NDA	
Kurnool	137	Kurnool	T. G. Bharath	TDP	NDA	Minister of Industries & Commerce, Food Processing
Kurnool	138	Panyam	Gowru Charitha Reddy	TDP	NDA	
Nandyal	139	Nandyal	N. M. D. Farooq	TDP	NDA	Minister of Minority Welfare, Law & Justice
Nandyal	140	Banaganapalle	B. C. Janardhan Reddy	TDP	NDA	Minister of Roads & Buildings, Infrastructure & Investments
Nandyal	141	Dhone	Kotla Jayasurya Prakasha Reddy	TDP	NDA	
Kurnool	142	Pattikonda	K. E. Shyam Babu	TDP	NDA	
Kurnool	143	Kodumur (SC)	Boggula Dastagiri	TDP	NDA	
Kurnool	144	Yemmiganur	Jaya Nageswara Reddy	TDP	NDA	
Kurnool	145	Mantralayam	Y. Balanagi Reddy	YSRCP	None	
Kurnool	146	Adoni	P. V. Parthasarathi	BJP	NDA	
Kurnool	147	Alur	Busine Virupakshi	YSRCP	None	
Anantapur	148	Rayadurg	Kalava Srinivasulu	TDP	NDA	Whip
Anantapur	149	Uravakonda	Payyavula Keshav	TDP	NDA	Minister of Finance, Planning, Commercial Taxes & Legislative Affairs
Anantapur	150	Guntakal	Gummanur Jayaram	TDP	NDA	
Anantapur	151	Tadipatri	J. C. Ashmit Reddy	TDP	NDA	
Anantapur	152	Singanamala (SC)	Bandaru Sravani Sree	TDP	NDA	
Anantapur	153	Anantapur Urban	Daggupati Venkateswara Prasad	TDP	NDA	
Anantapur	154	Kalyandurg	Amilineni Surendra Babu	TDP	NDA	
Anantapur	155	Raptadu	Paritala Sunitha	TDP	NDA	
Sri Sathya Sai	156	Madakasira (SC)	M. S. Raju	TDP	NDA	
Sri Sathya Sai	157	Hindupur	Nandamuri Balakrishna	TDP	NDA	
Sri Sathya Sai	158	Penukonda	S. Savitha	TDP	NDA	Minister of B.C. Welfare, Economically Weaker Sections Welfare, Handlooms & Textiles
Sri Sathya Sai	159	Puttaparthi	Palle Sindhura Reddy	TDP	NDA	
Sri Sathya Sai	160	Dharmavaram	Satya Kumar Yadav	BJP	NDA	Minister of Health & Family Welfare, Medical Education
Sri Sathya Sai	161	Kadiri	Kandikunta Venkata Prasad	TDP	NDA	
Annamayya	162	Thamballapalle	Peddireddy Dwarakanatha Reddy	YSRCP	None	
Annamayya	163	Pileru	Nallari Kishore Kumar Reddy	TDP	NDA	
Annamayya	164	Madanapalle	Shahjahan Basha	TDP	NDA	
Chittoor	165	Punganur	Peddireddy Ramachandra Reddy	YSRCP	None	
Tirupati	166	Chandragiri	Pulivarthi Venkata Mani Prasad	TDP	NDA	
Tirupati	167	Tirupati	Arani Srinivasulu	JSP	NDA	
Tirupati	168	Srikalahasti	Bojjala Venkata Sudhir Reddy	TDP	NDA	
Tirupati	169	Satyavedu (SC)	Koneti Adimulam	TDP	NDA	
Chittoor	170	Nagari	Gali Bhanu Prakash	TDP	NDA	
Chittoor	171	Gangadhara Nellore (SC)	V. M. Thomas	TDP	NDA	Whip
Chittoor	172	Chittoor	Gurajala Jagan Mohan	TDP	NDA	
Chittoor	173	Puthalapattu (SC)	Kalikiri Murali Mohan	TDP	NDA	
Chittoor	174	Palamaner	N. Amarnath Reddy	TDP	NDA	
Chittoor	175	Kuppam	N. Chandrababu Naidu	TDP	NDA	Chief Minister of Andhra Pradesh; National President of Telugu Desam Party

== See also ==
- Andhra Pradesh Legislature
