= Department of Mines and Geology (Andhra Pradesh) =

Head of the Ministry of Mines & Geology of the Government of Andhra Pradesh

Minister of Mines & Geology
- Ganulu mariyu Bhūgarbha Śāstra Śākha Mantrī
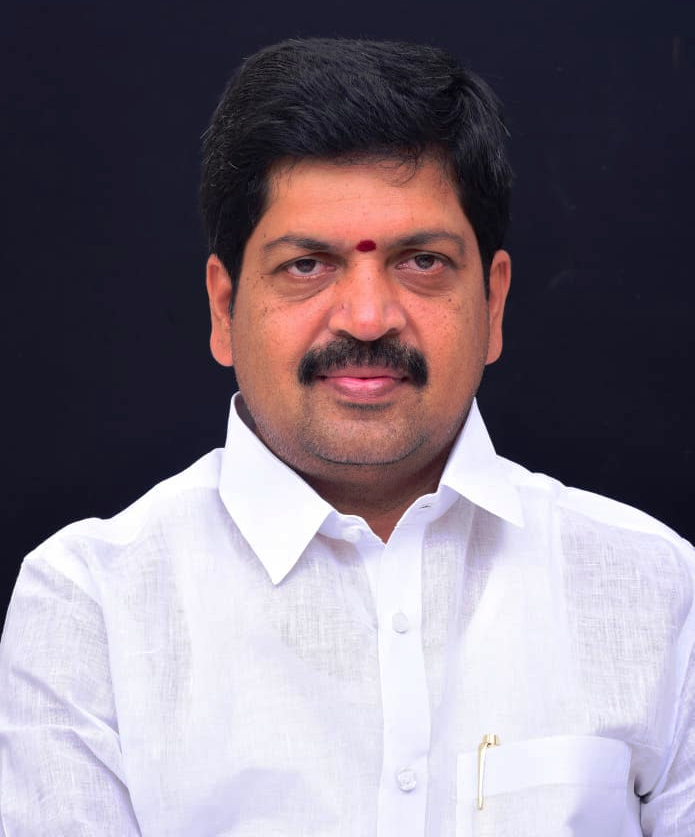
- Incumbent; Kollu Ravindra since 12 June 2024
- Department of Mines & Geology
- Member of: Andha Pradesh Cabinet
- Reports to: Governor of Andhra Pradesh; Chief Minister of Andhra Pradesh; Andhra Pradesh Legislature
- Appointer: Governor of Andhra Pradesh on the advice of the chief minister of Andhra Pradesh
- Inaugural holder: Peethala Sujatha
- Formation: 8 June 2014
- Website: Official website

The Minister of Mines & Geology is the head of the Department of Mines & Geology of the Government of Andhra Pradesh.

The incumbent Minister of Mines & Geology is Kollu Ravindra from the Telugu Desam Party.

== List of ministers ==
#	Portrait	Minister (Lifespan) Constituency	Term of office			Election (Term)	Party	Ministry	Chief Minister	Ref.
#	Portrait	Minister (Lifespan) Constituency	Term start	Term end	Duration	Election (Term)	Party	Ministry	Chief Minister	Ref.
1		Peethala Sujatha (born 1973); MLA for Chintalapudi	8 June 2014	1 April 2017	2 years, 297 days	2014 (14th)	Telugu Desam Party	Naidu III	N. Chandrababu Naidu	
2		R. V. Sujay Krishna Ranga Rao (born 1971); MLA for Bobbili	2 April 2017	29 May 2019	2 years, 57 days	2014 (14th)	Telugu Desam Party	Naidu III	N. Chandrababu Naidu	
3		Peddireddy Ramachandra Reddy (born 1952); MLA for Punganur	30 May 2019	11 June 2024	5 years, 12 days	2019 (15th)	YSR Congress Party	Jagan	Y. S. Jagan Mohan Reddy	
4		Kollu Ravindra (born 1973); MLA for Machilipatnam	12 June 2024	Incumbent	2 years, 87 days	2024 (16th)	Telugu Desam Party	Naidu IV	N. Chandrababu Naidu	
