= List of ministers of legislative affairs of Andhra Pradesh =

Head of the Ministry of Legislative Affairs of the Government of Andhra Pradesh

Minister of Legislative Affairs
- Śāsana Sabha Vyavahārāla Śākha Mantrī
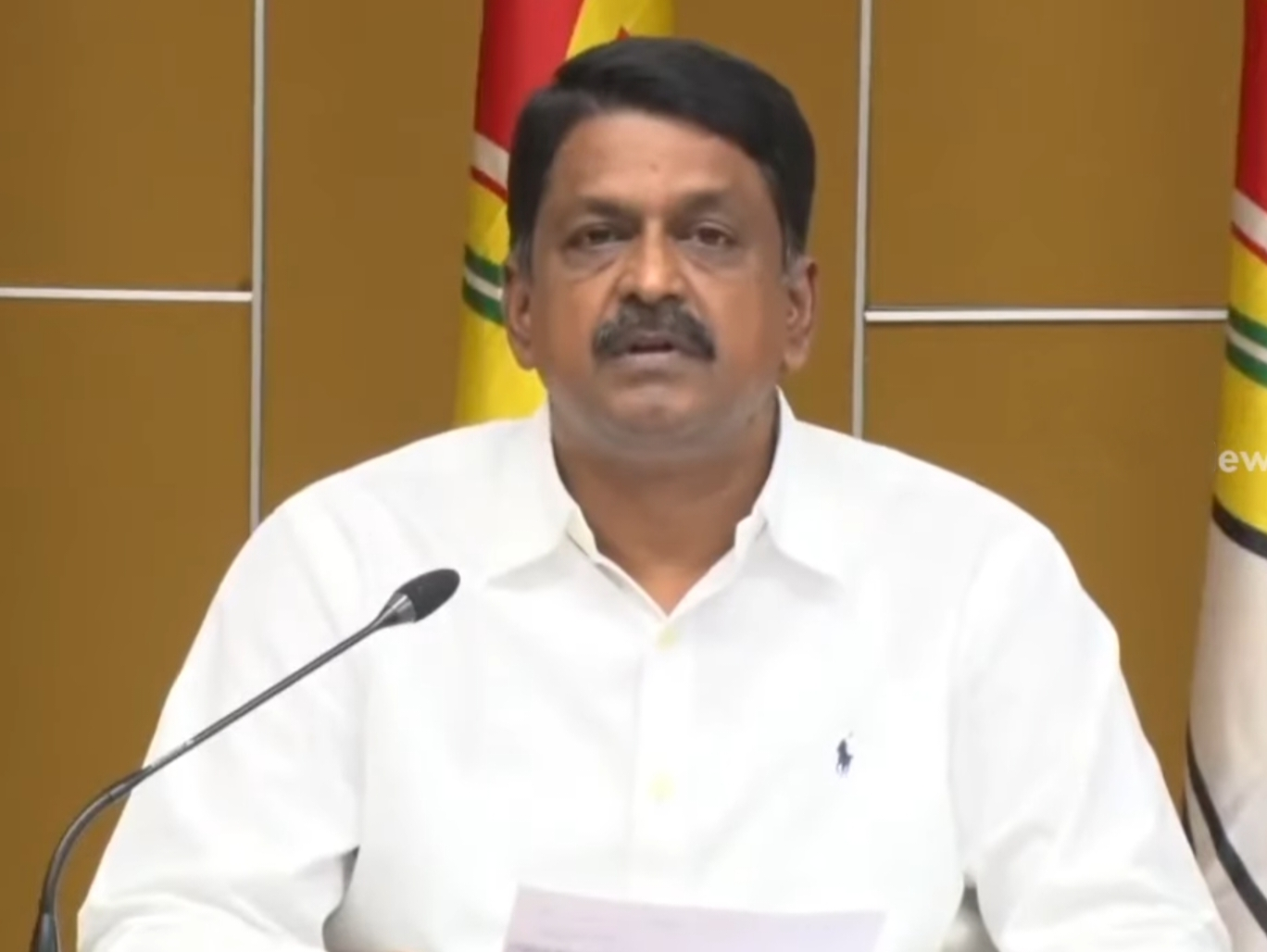
- Incumbent; Payyavula Keshav since 12 June 2024
- Department of Legislative Affairs
- Member of: Andha Pradesh Cabinet
- Reports to: Governor of Andhra Pradesh; Chief Minister of Andhra Pradesh; Andhra Pradesh Legislature
- Appointer: Governor of Andhra Pradesh on the advice of the chief minister of Andhra Pradesh
- Inaugural holder: Yanamala Rama Krishnudu
- Formation: 8 June 2014

The Minister of Legislative Affairs is the head of the Department of Legislative Affairs of the Government of Andhra Pradesh. The minister is one of the senior-most officers in the Cabinet of Andhra Pradesh, with as chief responsibility the maintenance of the state legislative affairs.

From June 2014 to May 2019, the Legislative Affairs Minister of Andhra Pradesh was Yanamala Rama Krishnudu from the Telugu Desam Party, taking over the reins from Sake Sailajanath before the bifurcation of the state into the present-day residual Andhra Pradesh and Telangana. Following the cabinet formation on 12 June 2024, Payyavula Keshav assumed the office under the Chief Ministership of N. Chandrababu Naidu.

== List of ministers ==
| # | Portrait | Minister (Lifespan) Constituency | Term of office | | | Election (Term) | Party | Ministry | Chief Minister | Ref. |
| # | Portrait | Minister (Lifespan) Constituency | Term start | Term end | Duration | Election (Term) | Party | Ministry | Chief Minister | Ref. |
|---|---|---|---|---|---|---|---|---|---|---|
| 1 | | Yanamala Rama Krishnudu (born 1951); MLC | 8 June 2014 | 29 May 2019 | 4 years, 355 days | 2014 (14th) | Telugu Desam Party | Naidu III | N. Chandrababu Naidu | |
| 2 | | Buggana Rajendranath Reddy (born 1970); MLA for Dhone | 30 May 2019 | 11 June 2024 | 5 years, 12 days | 2019 (15th) | YSR Congress Party | Jagan | Y. S. Jagan Mohan Reddy | |
| 3 | | Payyavula Keshav (born 1965); MLA for Uravakonda | 12 June 2024 | Incumbent | 2 years, 87 days | 2024 (16th) | Telugu Desam Party | Naidu IV | N. Chandrababu Naidu | |
