= Department of Human Resources Development (Andhra Pradesh) =

Head of the Ministry of Education of the Government of Andhra Pradesh

Minister of Human Resources Development
- Mānava Vanarula Abhivr̥d'dhi Śākha Mantrī
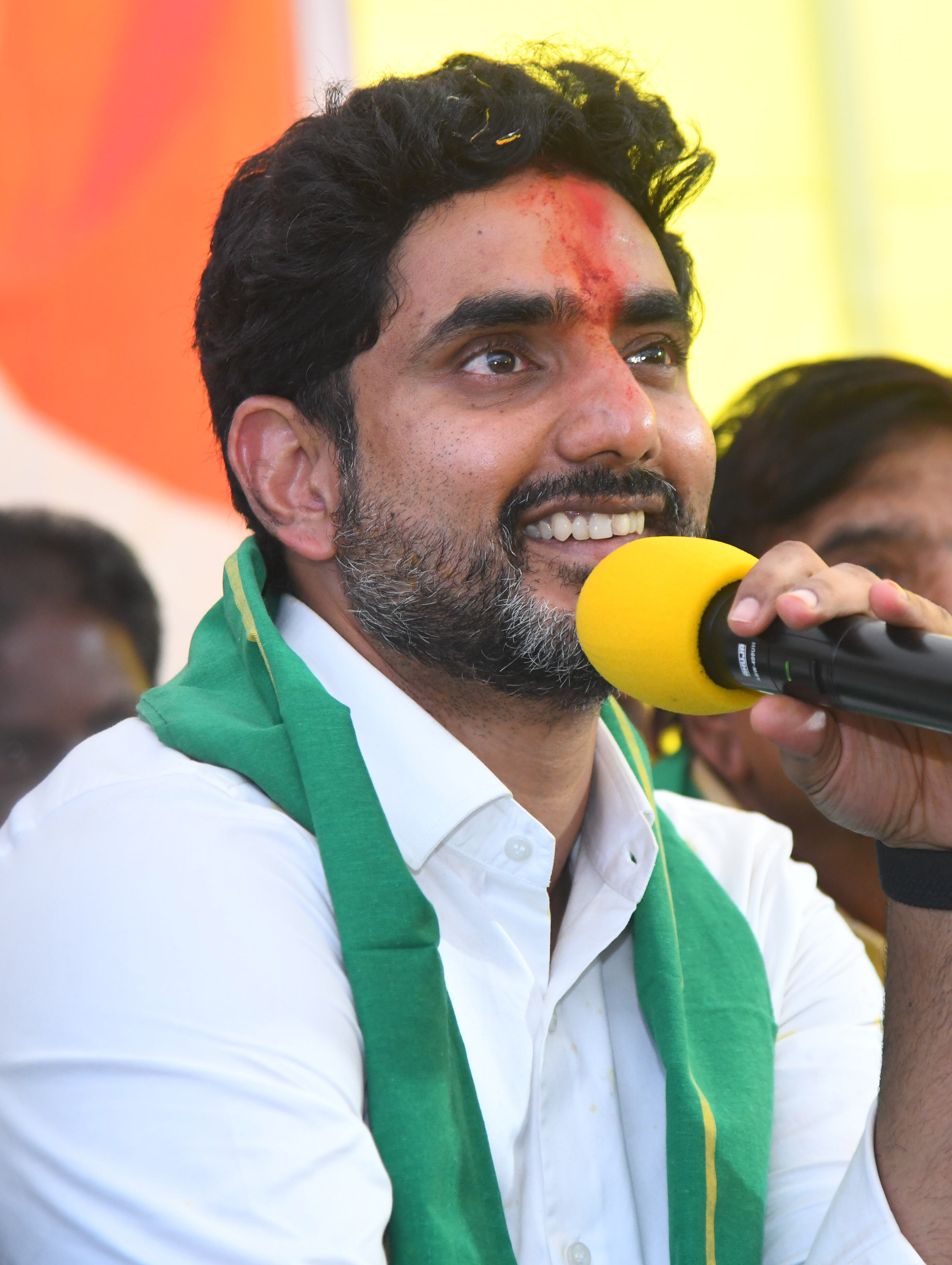
- Incumbent; Nara Lokesh since 12 June 2024
- Department of Human Resources Development
- Abbreviation: HRD
- Member of: Andha Pradesh Cabinet
- Reports to: Governor of Andhra Pradesh; Chief Minister of Andhra Pradesh; Andhra Pradesh Legislature
- Appointer: Governor of Andhra Pradesh on the advice of the Chief Minister of Andhra Pradesh
- Inaugural holder: Ganta Srinivasa Rao
- Formation: 8 June 2014
- Website: Official website

The Minister of Human Resources Development is the head of the Department of Education of the Government of Andhra Pradesh. One of the senior-most officers in the Cabinet of Andhra Pradesh. Occasionally, the minister is assisted by the Minister of State for Education.

From June 2014 to May 2019, following the bifurcation of United Andhra Pradesh into the present-day residual Andhra Pradesh and Telangana, the Education Minister of Andhra Pradesh was Ganta Srinivasa Rao of the Telugu Desam Party. Following the cabinet formation on 12 June 2024, Nara Lokesh assumed the office under the Chief Ministership of N. Chandrababu Naidu.

== List of ministers ==
#	Portrait	Minister (Lifespan) Constituency	Term of office			Election (Term)	Party	Ministry	Chief Minister	Ref.
#	Portrait	Minister (Lifespan) Constituency	Term start	Term end	Duration	Election (Term)	Party	Ministry	Chief Minister	Ref.
1		Ganta Srinivasa Rao (born 1960); MLA for Bheemili	8 June 2014	29 May 2019	4 years, 355 days	2014 (14th)	Telugu Desam Party	Naidu III	N. Chandrababu Naidu	
2		Audimulapu Suresh (born 1964); MLA for Yerragondapalem	8 June 2019	7 April 2022	2 years, 303 days	2019 (15th)	YSR Congress Party	Jagan	Y. S. Jagan Mohan Reddy	
3		Botsa Satyanarayana (born 1958); MLA for Cheepurupalli	11 April 2022	8 June 2024	2 years, 58 days	2019 (15th)	YSR Congress Party	Jagan	Y. S. Jagan Mohan Reddy	
4		Nara Lokesh (born 1983); MLA for Mangalagiri	12 June 2024	Incumbent	2 years, 87 days	2024 (16th)	Telugu Desam Party	Naidu IV	N. Chandrababu Naidu	
