= Department of Agriculture (Andhra Pradesh) =

Head of the Ministry of Agriculture of the Government of Andhra Pradesh

Minister of Agriculture
- Vyavasāya Śākha Mantrī
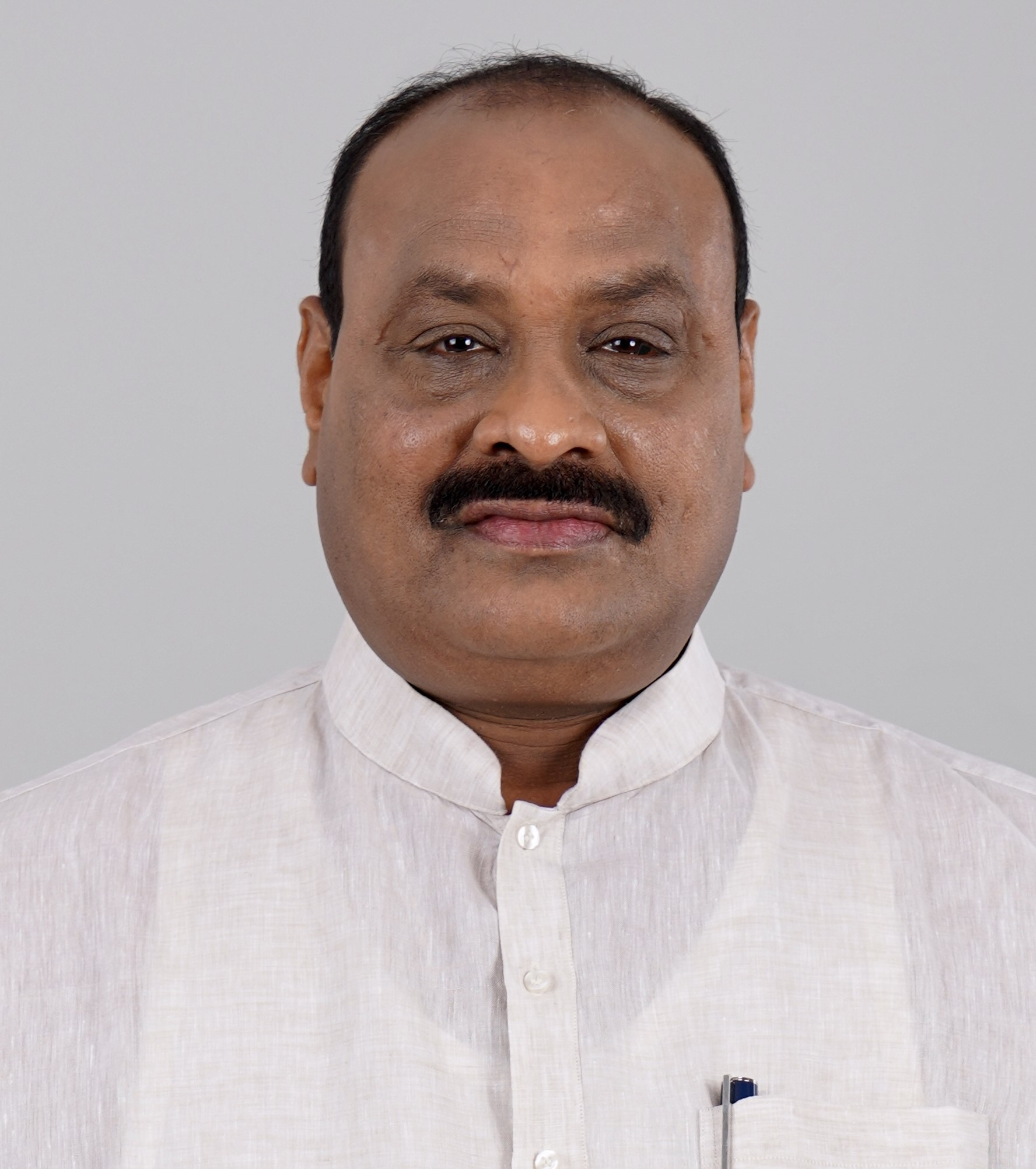
- Incumbent; Kinjarapu Atchannaidu since 12 June 2024
- Department of Agriculture
- Member of: Andha Pradesh Cabinet
- Reports to: Governor of Andhra Pradesh; Chief Minister of Andhra Pradesh; Andhra Pradesh Legislature
- Appointer: Governor of Andhra Pradesh on the advice of the chief minister of Andhra Pradesh
- Inaugural holder: Prathipati Pulla Rao
- Formation: 8 June 2014
- Website: Official website

The Minister of Agriculture is the head of the Department of Agriculture of the Government of Andhra Pradesh.

The incumbent Minister of Agriculture is Kinjarapu Atchannaidu from the Telugu Desam Party.

== List of ministers ==
#	Portrait	Minister (Lifespan) Constituency	Term of office			Election (Term)	Party	Ministry	Chief Minister	Ref.
#	Portrait	Minister (Lifespan) Constituency	Term start	Term end	Duration	Election (Term)	Party	Ministry	Chief Minister	Ref.
1		Prathipati Pulla Rao (born 1958); MLA for Chilakaluripet	8 June 2014	1 April 2017	2 years, 297 days	2014 (14th)	Telugu Desam Party	Naidu III	N. Chandrababu Naidu	
2		Somireddy Chandra Mohan Reddy (born 1956); MLC	2 April 2017	29 May 2019	2 years, 57 days	2014 (14th)	Telugu Desam Party	Naidu III	N. Chandrababu Naidu	
3		Kurasala Kannababu (born 1970); MLA for Kakinada Rural	30 May 2019	7 April 2022	2 years, 312 days	2019 (15th)	YSR Congress Party	Jagan	Y. S. Jagan Mohan Reddy	
4		Kakani Govardhan Reddy (born 1964); MLA for Sarvepalli	11 April 2022	11 June 2024	2 years, 61 days	2019 (15th)	YSR Congress Party	Jagan	Y. S. Jagan Mohan Reddy	
5		Kinjarapu Atchannaidu (born 1969); MLA for Tekkali	12 June 2024	Incumbent	2 years, 87 days	2024 (16th)	Telugu Desam Party	Naidu IV	N. Chandrababu Naidu	
