= Department of Excise (Andhra Pradesh) =

Head of the Ministry of Excise of the Government of Andhra Pradesh

Minister of Excise
- Eksaij Śākha Mantrī
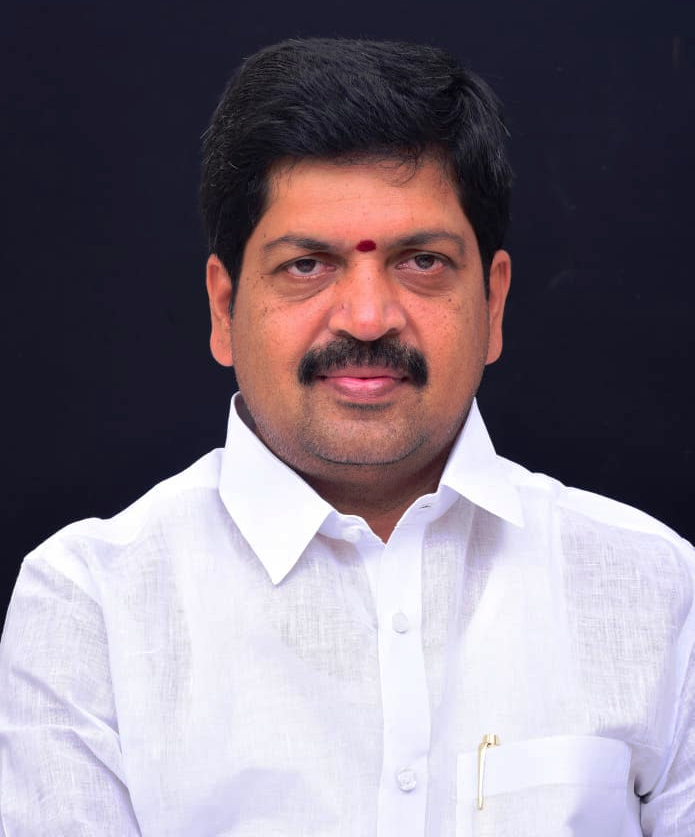
- Incumbent; Kollu Ravindra since 12 June 2024
- Department of Excise
- Abbreviation: IEMS
- Member of: Andha Pradesh Cabinet
- Reports to: Governor of Andhra Pradesh; Chief Minister of Andhra Pradesh; Andhra Pradesh Legislature
- Appointer: Governor of Andhra Pradesh on the advice of the chief minister of Andhra Pradesh
- Inaugural holder: Kollu Ravindra
- Formation: 8 June 2014
- Website: Official website

The Minister of Excise is the head of the Department of Excise of the Government of Andhra Pradesh.

The incumbent Minister of Excise is Kollu Ravindra from the Telugu Desam Party.

== List of ministers ==
| # | Portrait | Minister (Lifespan) Constituency | Term of office | | | Election (Term) | Party | Ministry | Chief Minister | Ref. |
| # | Portrait | Minister (Lifespan) Constituency | Term start | Term end | Duration | Election (Term) | Party | Ministry | Chief Minister | Ref. |
|---|---|---|---|---|---|---|---|---|---|---|
| 1 | | Kollu Ravindra (born 1973); MLA for Machilipatnam | 8 June 2014 | 1 April 2017 | 2 years, 297 days | 2014 (14th) | Telugu Desam Party | Naidu III | N. Chandrababu Naidu | |
| 2 | | Kothapalli Samuel Jawahar (born 1965); MLA for Kovvur | 2 April 2017 | 29 May 2019 | 2 years, 57 days | 2014 (14th) | Telugu Desam Party | Naidu III | N. Chandrababu Naidu | |
| 3 | | K. Narayana Swamy (born 1949); MLA for Gangadhara Nellore | 30 May 2019 | 11 June 2024 | 5 years, 12 days | 2019 (15th) | YSR Congress Party | Jagan | Y. S. Jagan Mohan Reddy | |
| (1) | | Kollu Ravindra (born 1973); MLA for Machilipatnam | 12 June 2024 (2nd term) | Incumbent | 2 years, 87 days | 2024 (16th) | Telugu Desam Party | Naidu IV | N. Chandrababu Naidu | |
