= List of ministers of factories of Andhra Pradesh =

Head of the Ministry of Factories of the Government of Andhra Pradesh

Minister of Factories
- Karmāgārāla Śākha Mantrī
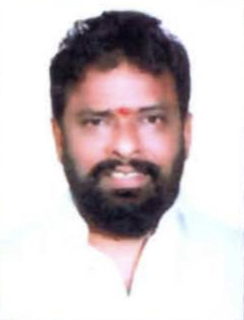
- Incumbent; Vasamsetti Subhash since 12 June 2024
- Department of Factories
- Member of: Andha Pradesh Cabinet
- Reports to: Governor of Andhra Pradesh; Chief Minister of Andhra Pradesh; Andhra Pradesh Legislature
- Appointer: Governor of Andhra Pradesh on the advice of the chief minister of Andhra Pradesh
- Inaugural holder: Kinjarapu Atchannaidu
- Formation: 8 June 2014
- Website: Official website

The Minister of Factories is the head of the Department of Factories of the Government of Andhra Pradesh.

The incumbent Minister of Factories is Vasamsetti Subhash from the Telugu Desam Party.

== List of ministers ==
#	Portrait	Minister (Lifespan) Constituency	Term of office			Election (Term)	Party	Ministry	Chief Minister	Ref.
#	Portrait	Minister (Lifespan) Constituency	Term start	Term end	Duration	Election (Term)	Party	Ministry	Chief Minister	Ref.
1		Kinjarapu Atchannaidu (born 1969); MLA for Tekkali	8 June 2014	1 April 2017	2 years, 297 days	2014 (14th)	Telugu Desam Party	Naidu III	N. Chandrababu Naidu	
2		Satyanarayana Pithani (born 1953); MLA for Achanta	2 April 2017	29 May 2019	2 years, 57 days	2014 (14th)	Telugu Desam Party	Naidu III	N. Chandrababu Naidu	
3		Gummanur Jayaram (born 1965); MLA for Alur	30 May 2019	5 March 2024	4 years, 280 days	2019 (15th)	YSR Congress Party	Jagan	Y. S. Jagan Mohan Reddy	
4		Vasamsetti Subhash (born 1978); MLA for Ramachandrapuram	12 June 2024	Incumbent	2 years, 87 days	2024 (16th)	Telugu Desam Party	Naidu IV	N. Chandrababu Naidu	
