= List of ministers of housing of Andhra Pradesh =

Head of the Ministry of Housing of the Government of Andhra Pradesh

Minister of Housing
- Gr̥ha Nirmāṇa Śākha Mantrī
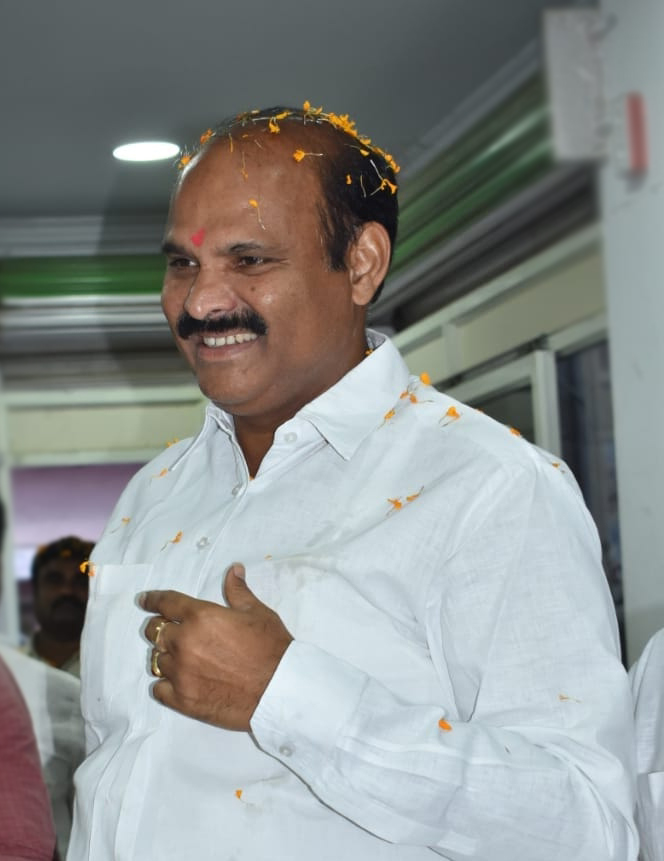
- Incumbent; Kolusu Parthasarathy since 12 June 2024
- Department of Housing
- Member of: Andha Pradesh Cabinet
- Reports to: Governor of Andhra Pradesh; Chief Minister of Andhra Pradesh; Andhra Pradesh Legislature
- Appointer: Governor of Andhra Pradesh on the advice of the chief minister of Andhra Pradesh
- Precursor: Jogi Ramesh
- Inaugural holder: Kimidi Mrunalini
- Formation: 8 June 2014
- Website: Official website

The Minister of Housing is the head of the Department of Housing of the Government of Andhra Pradesh.

The incumbent Minister of Housing is Kolusu Parthasarathy from the Telugu Desam Party.

== List of ministers ==
#	Portrait	Minister (Lifespan) Constituency	Term of office			Election (Term)	Party	Ministry	Chief Minister	Ref.
#	Portrait	Minister (Lifespan) Constituency	Term start	Term end	Duration	Election (Term)	Party	Ministry	Chief Minister	Ref.
1		Kimidi Mrunalini (born 1958); MLA for Cheepurupalli	8 June 2014	1 April 2017	2 years, 297 days	2014 (14th)	Telugu Desam Party	Naidu III	N. Chandrababu Naidu	
2		Kalava Srinivasulu; Rural Housing (born 1964); MLA for Rayadurg	2 April 2017	29 May 2019	2 years, 57 days	2014 (14th)	Telugu Desam Party	Naidu III	N. Chandrababu Naidu	
2		Ponguru Narayana; Urban Housing (born 1957); MLC	2 April 2017	29 May 2019	2 years, 57 days	2014 (14th)	Telugu Desam Party	Naidu III	N. Chandrababu Naidu	
3		Cherukuvada Sri Ranganadha Raju (born 1953); MLA for Achanta	30 May 2019	7 April 2022	2 years, 312 days	2019 (15th)	YSR Congress Party	Jagan	Y. S. Jagan Mohan Reddy	
4		Jogi Ramesh (born 1970); MLA for Pedana	11 April 2022	11 June 2024	2 years, 61 days	2019 (15th)	YSR Congress Party	Jagan	Y. S. Jagan Mohan Reddy	
5		Kolusu Parthasarathy (born 1965); MLA for Nuzvid	12 June 2024	Incumbent	2 years, 87 days	2024 (16th)	Telugu Desam Party	Naidu IV	N. Chandrababu Naidu	
