= Songa Roshan Kumar =

Indian politician

Member of the Andhra Pradesh Legislative Assembly
- Incumbent
- Assumed office 2024
- Preceded by: Vunnamatla Eliza
- Constituency: Chintalapudi

Personal details
- Party: Telugu Desam Party

Songa Roshan Kumar is an Indian politician from Andhra Pradesh. He is a member of Telugu Desam Party.

== Political career ==
Kumar was elected as the Member of the Legislative Assembly representing the Chintalapudi Assembly constituency in the 2024 Andhra Pradesh Legislative Assembly elections. He won the elections by a margin of 27766 votes defeating Kambham Vijaya Raju of the YSR Congress Party.

== Electoral performance ==
2024 Andhra Pradesh Legislative Assembly election: Chintalapudi
| Party | Candidate | Votes | % | ±% |
|---|---|---|---|---|
| TDP | Songa Roshan Kumar | 120,126 | 53.3 | |
| YSRCP | Kambham Vijaya Raju | 92,360 | 40.98 | |
| INC | Vunnamatla Eliza | 4,958 | 2.20 | |
| NOTA | None Of The Above | 4,121 | 1.83 | |
| Majority | | 27,766 | 12.1 | |
| Turnout | | 2,25,391 | | |
| TDP gain from YSRCP | | Swing | | |
