= Paritala Sunitha =

Indian politician

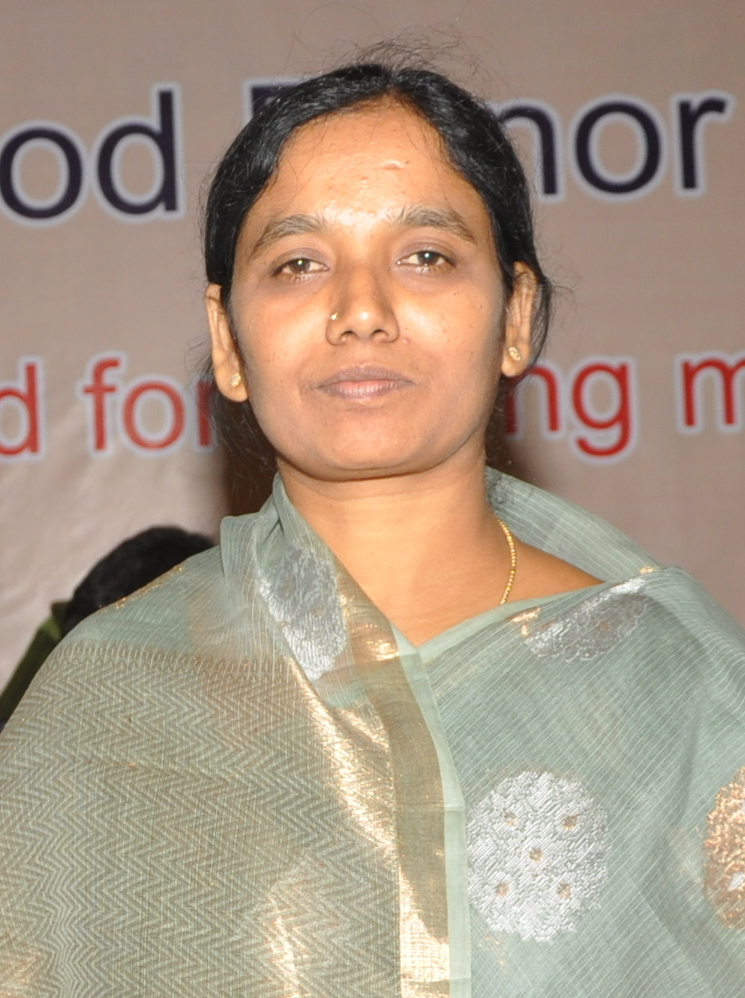
- Paritala Sunitha in 2014

Minister for SERP, Women Empowerment and Child Welfare, Disabled and Senior Citizens Welfare Government of Andhra Pradesh
- In office 2 April 2017 – 29 May 2019
- Governor: E. S. L. Narasimhan
- Chief Minister: N. Chandrababu Naidu
- Preceded by: Peethala Sujatha
- Succeeded by: Peddireddy Ramachandra Reddy (Panchayat Raj & Rural Development;SERP); Taneti Vanitha (Women and Child Welfare); Y. S. Jagan Mohan Reddy (Disabled and Senior Citizen Welfare)

Minister for Price Monitoring, Consumer Affairs, Food & Civil Supplies Government of Andhra Pradesh
- In office 8 June 2014 – 2 April 2017
- Governor: E. S. L. Narasimhan
- Chief Minister: N. Chandrababu Naidu
- Preceded by: N. Kiran Kumar Reddy (Chief Minister)
- Succeeded by: Prathipati Pulla Rao

Member of the Andhra Pradesh Legislative Assembly
- Incumbent
- Assumed office 2024
- Preceded by: Thopudurthi Prakash Reddy
- Constituency: Raptadu
- In office 2009–2019
- Preceded by: Constituency established
- Succeeded by: Thopudurthi Prakash Reddy
- Constituency: Raptadu

Personal details
- Born: India
- Party: Telugu Desam Party
- Spouse: Paritala Ravindra
- Children: 3 (including Paritala Sriram)

Paritala Sunitha is an Indian politician. She is a member of the Legislative Assembly and Minister of SERP, Women Empowerment, Child Welfare, Disabled and Senior Citizens Welfare of the Indian state of Andhra Pradesh representing the Raptadu constituency of Anantapur. She represents the Telugu Desam Party.

== Personal life ==
Paritala Sunitha was married to Paritala Ravindra. She has three children. She has three siblings.

== Political career ==
Paritala Sunitha entered politics following the death of her husband. She was elected as a Member of Legislative Assembly (MLA) for Raptadu constituency in 2009 and 2014 elections. She has not contested the 2019 elections to pave the path for her son, Paritala Sriram and she won in the elections of 2024 as member of legislative assembly.

== Popular culture ==
Ram Gopal Varma made the film, Rakta Charitra, based on the life of her husband. Radhika Apte played her character while Vivek Oberoi played her husband.
