= Vunnamatla Eliza =

Indian politician

Vunnamatla Rakada Eliza (born 1962) is an Indian politician from Andhra Pradesh. He won the 2019 Andhra Pradesh Legislative Assembly Election on YSR Congress Party ticket from Chintalapudi SC reserved constituency in Eluru district.

== Early life and education ==
Eliza is born in Chintalapudi to Subbarao. He is a retired government employee.

== Career ==
Eliza won the 2019 Andhra Pradesh Legislative Assembly Election on YSR Congress Party ticket from Chintalapudi constituency from the erstwhile West Godavari district. In 2019, he got a vote share of 53.5 per cent and defeated Karra Raja Rao of Telugu Desam Party by a margin of 36,175 votes. After he was dropped for the 2024 Andhra Pradesh Legislative Assembly Election, he joined the Indian National Congress party which nominated him to contest from the same seat for the 2024 Assembly election. However, he could finish only third behind winner, Roshan Kumar Songa of Telugu Desam and Kambham Vijaya Raju of YSRCP.
