= Raptadu Assembly constituency =

Constituency of the Andhra Pradesh Legislative Assembly, India

Coordinates: 14.62°N 77.61°E

Raptadu
- Constituency No. 155 for the Andhra Pradesh Legislative Assembly
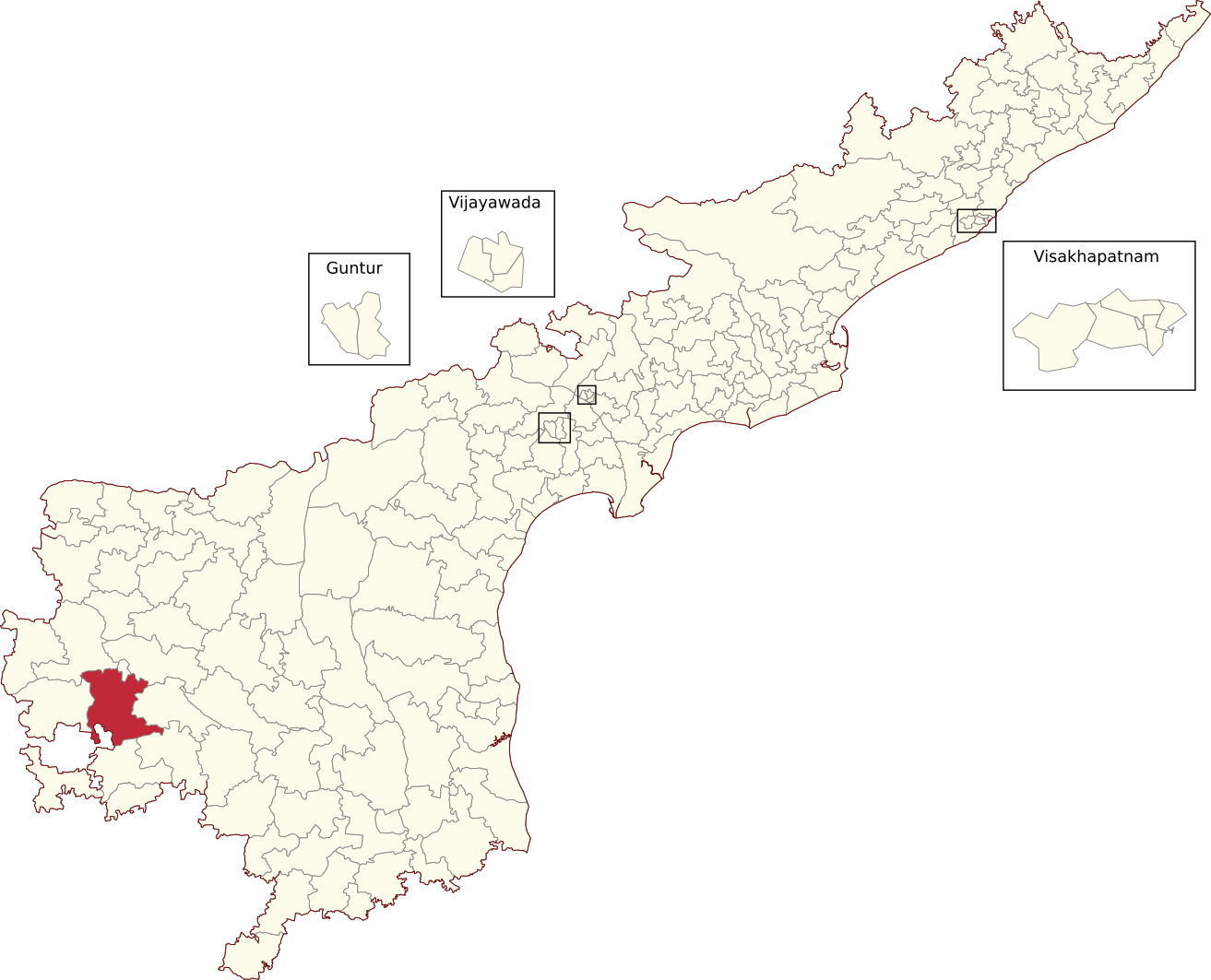
- Location of Raptadu Assembly constituency within Andhra Pradesh

Constituency details
- Country: India
- Region: South India
- State: Andhra Pradesh
- District: Anantapur
- Lok Sabha constituency: Hindupur
- Established: 2008
- Total electors: 245,435
- Reservation: None

Member of Legislative Assembly
- 16th Andhra Pradesh Legislative Assembly
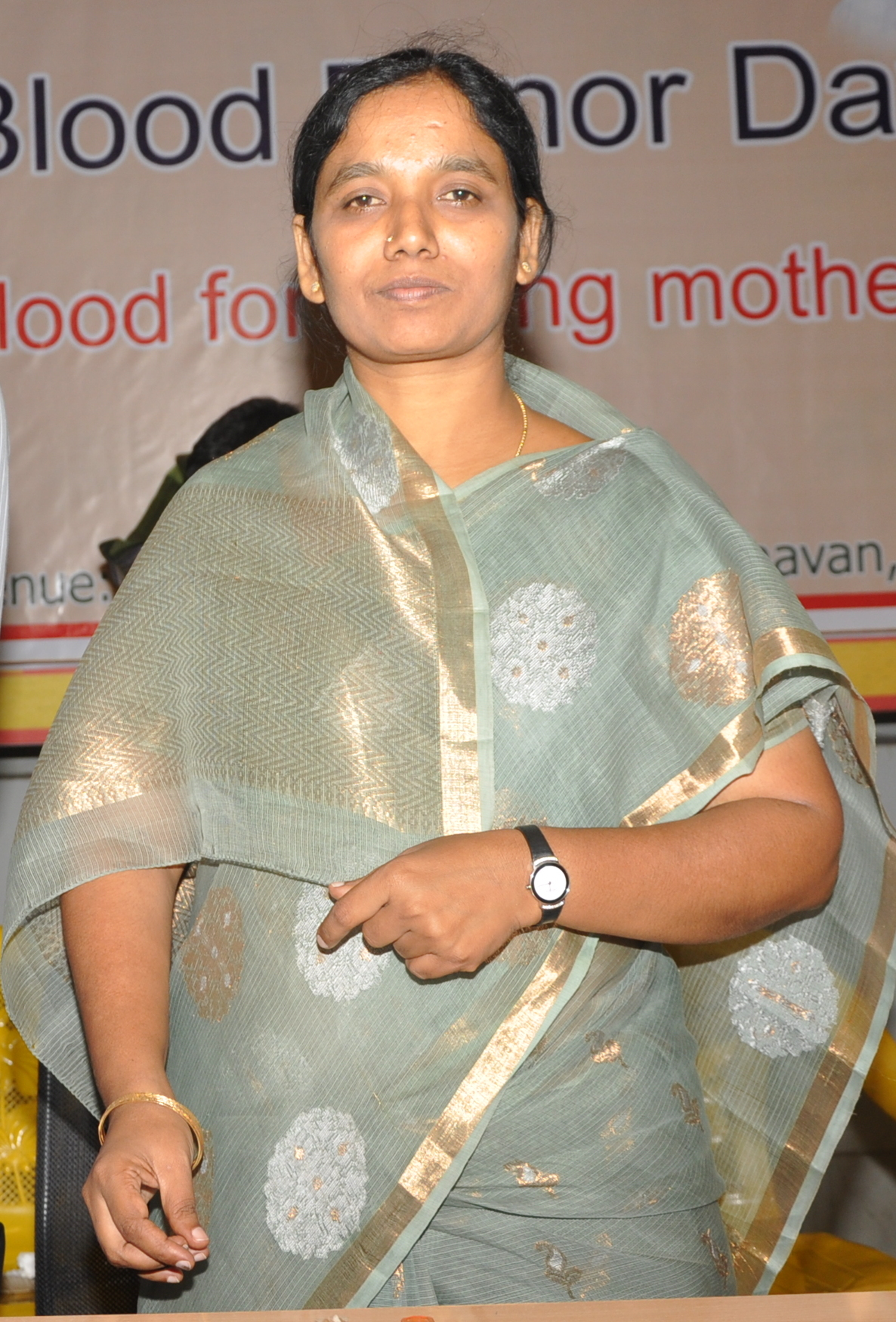
- Incumbent Paritala Sunitha
- Party: TDP
- Alliance: NDA
- Elected year: 2024

Raptadu Assembly constituency is a constituency in Anantapur district of Andhra Pradesh that elects representatives to the Andhra Pradesh Legislative Assembly in India. It is one of the seven assembly segments of Hindupur Lok Sabha constituency.

Paritala Sunitha is the current MLA of the constituency, having won the 2024 Andhra Pradesh Legislative Assembly election from Telugu Desam Party. As of 2019, there are a total of 245,435 electors in the constituency. The constituency was established in 2008, as per the Delimitation Orders (2008).

== Mandals ==
Mandal	District
Anantapur Rural	Anantapur
Atmakur	Anantapur
Raptadu	Anantapur
C.K.Palli	Sri Sathya Sai
Kanaganapalli	Sri Sathya Sai
Ramagiri	Sri Sathya Sai

== Members of the Legislative Assembly ==
Year	Member	Political party
2009	Paritala Sunitha	Telugu Desam Party
2014	Paritala Sunitha	Telugu Desam Party
2019	Thopudurthi Prakash Reddy	YSR Congress Party
2024	Paritala Sunitha	Telugu Desam Party

== Election results ==
=== 2009 ===
2009 Andhra Pradesh Legislative Assembly election: Raptadu
Party	Candidate	Votes	%	±%
TDP	Paritala Sunitha	64,559	45.35	
INC	Thopudurthi Prakash Reddy	62,852	44.15	
Majority		1,707	1.20	
Turnout		142,368	77.16	
TDP win (new seat)				

=== 2014 ===
2014 Andhra Pradesh Legislative Assembly election: Raptadu
Party	Candidate	Votes	%	±%
TDP	Paritala Sunitha	91,394	51.00	
YSRCP	Thopudurthi Prakash Reddy	83,620	46.7	
Majority		7,774	4.32	
Turnout		179,941	84.50	
TDP hold		Swing		

=== 2019 ===
2019 Andhra Pradesh Legislative Assembly election: Raptadu
Party	Candidate	Votes	%	±%
YSRCP	Thopudurthi Prakash Reddy	111,201	55.00	+8.30
TDP	Paritala Sreeram	85,626	42.35	−8.65
Majority		25,575	12.65	
Turnout		2,02,180		
YSR Congress gain from TDP		Swing		

=== 2024 ===
2024 Andhra Pradesh Legislative Assembly election: Raptadu
Party	Candidate	Votes	%	±%
TDP	Paritala Sunitha	116,140	53.48	
YSRCP	Thopudurthi Prakash Reddy	92,811	42.74	
INC	Adi Andhra Sankaraiah	3,456	1.59	
NOTA	None Of The Above	1,706	0.78	
Majority		23,329	10.74	
Turnout		2,17,157		
TDP gain from YSRCP		Swing		

== See also ==
- List of constituencies of Andhra Pradesh Legislative Assembly
