= Chintalapudi Assembly constituency =

Constituency of the Andhra Pradesh Legislative Assembly, India

Coordinates: 17.07°N 80.99°E

Chintalapudi
- Constituency No. 68 for the Andhra Pradesh Legislative Assembly
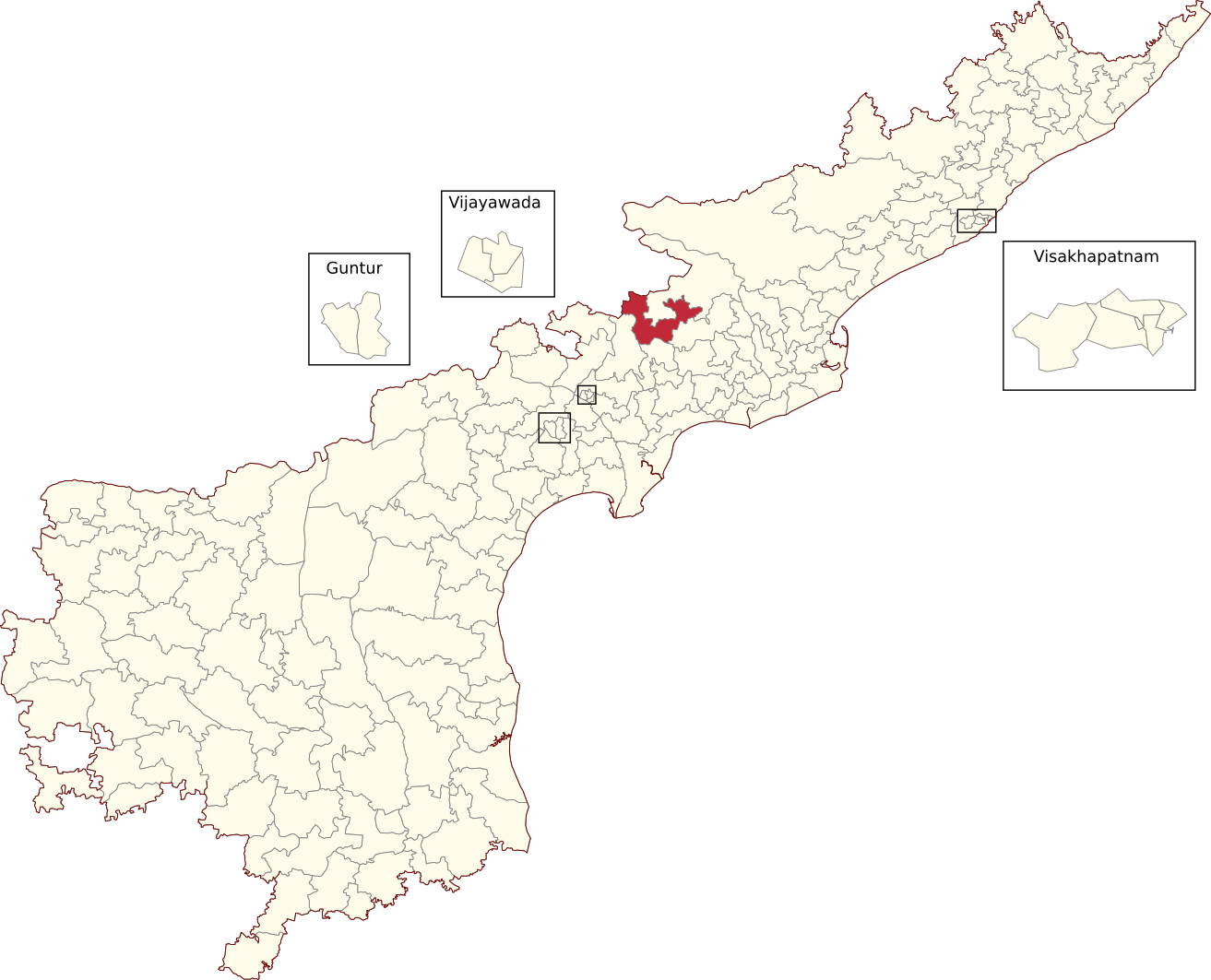
- Location of Chintalapudi Assembly constituency within Andhra Pradesh

Constituency details
- Country: India
- Region: South India
- State: Andhra Pradesh
- District: Eluru
- Lok Sabha constituency: Eluru
- Established: 1951
- Total electors: 263,337
- Reservation: SC

Member of Legislative Assembly
- 16th Andhra Pradesh Legislative Assembly
- Incumbent Songa Roshan Kumar
- Party: TDP
- Alliance: NDA
- Elected year: 2024

Chintalapudi is a Scheduled Caste reserved constituency in Eluru district of Andhra Pradesh that elects representatives to the Andhra Pradesh Legislative Assembly in India. It is one of the seven assembly segments of Eluru Lok Sabha constituency.

Songa Roshan Kumar is the current MLA of the constituency, having won the 2024 Andhra Pradesh Legislative Assembly election from Telugu Desam Party. The constituency was established in 1951, as per the Delimitation Orders (1951).

== Mandals ==
The four mandals that form the assembly constituency are:

Mandal
Chintalapudi
Lingapalem
Kamavarapukota
Jangareddigudem

== Members of the Legislative Assembly ==
Year	Member	Political party
1952	Motaparithi Kunerao	Communist Party of India
1962	Revulagadda Yesupadam	Indian National Congress
1967	G. Vishnumurthy	Indian National Congress
1972	Koneswararao Dannapaneni	Independent
1978	Gadde Venkateswara Rao	Indian National Congress (I)
1983	Kotagiri Vidyadhara Rao	Independent
1985	Kotagiri Vidyadhara Rao	Telugu Desam Party
1989	Kotagiri Vidyadhara Rao	Telugu Desam Party
1994	Kotagiri Vidyadhara Rao	Telugu Desam Party
1999	Kotagiri Vidyadhara Rao	Telugu Desam Party
2004	Ghanta Murali Ramakrishna	Indian National Congress
2009	Maddala Rajesh Kumar	Indian National Congress
2014	Peethala Sujatha	Telugu Desam Party
2019	Vunnamatla Rakada Eliza	YSR Congress Party
2024	Songa Roshan Kumar	Telugu Desam Party

== Election results ==
=== 1952 ===
1952 Madras Legislative Assembly election: Chintalapudi
Party	Candidate	Votes	%	±%
CPI	Motaparithi Kunerao	24,003	45.95%	
INC	Kamadana Venkatarama Surya Prakasa Rao	16,667	31.91%	31.91%
KMPP	Kummareddi Suryanarayana	11,562	22.14%	
Margin of victory		7,336	14.05%	
Turnout		52,232	72.81%	
Registered electors		71,734		
CPI win (new seat)				

=== 2004 ===
2004 Andhra Pradesh Legislative Assembly election: Chintalapudi
Party	Candidate	Votes	%	±%
INC	Ghanta Murali Ramakrishna	75,044	49.58	+16.40
TDP	Kotagiri Vidyadher Rao	73,538	48.53	−8.50
Majority		1,506	1.05	
Turnout		151,546	86.68	+4.78
INC gain from TDP		Swing		

=== 2009 ===
2009 Andhra Pradesh Legislative Assembly election: Chintalapudi
Party	Candidate	Votes	%	±%
INC	Maddala Rajesh Kumar	62,078	33.35	−11.23
TDP	Karra Raja Rao	60,661	32.55	−10.98
PRP	K M Ambedkar	45,778	27.03	
Majority		1,417	0.80	
Turnout		177,513	83.73	−2.95
INC hold		Swing		

=== 2014 ===
2014 Andhra Pradesh Legislative Assembly election: Chintalapudi
Party	Candidate	Votes	%	±%
TDP	Peethala Sujatha	105,417	52.04	
YSRCP	Burla Devi Priya	90,253	44.56	
Majority		15,164	7.48	
Turnout		202,553	84.40	+0.67
TDP gain from INC		Swing		

=== 2019 ===
2019 Andhra Pradesh Legislative Assembly election: Chintalapudi
Party	Candidate	Votes	%	±%
YSRCP	Vunnamatla Eliza	115,755	53.53	
TDP	Karra Rajarao	79,580	36.8	
Majority		36,175	16.73	
Turnout		216,232	84.40	+0.67
YSRCP gain from TDP		Swing		

=== 2024 ===
2024 Andhra Pradesh Legislative Assembly election: Chintalapudi
Party	Candidate	Votes	%	±%
TDP	Songa Roshan Kumar	120,126	53.3	
YSRCP	Kambham Vijaya Raju	92,360	40.98	
INC	Vunnamatla Eliza	4,958	2.20	
NOTA	None Of The Above	4,121	1.83	
Majority		27,766	12.1	
Turnout		2,25,391		
TDP gain from YSRCP		Swing		

== See also ==
- List of constituencies of Andhra Pradesh Legislative Assembly
