= 15th Andhra Pradesh Assembly =

2019 Andhra Pradesh lower house

15th Legislative Assembly of Andhra Pradesh
←	14th	16th	→
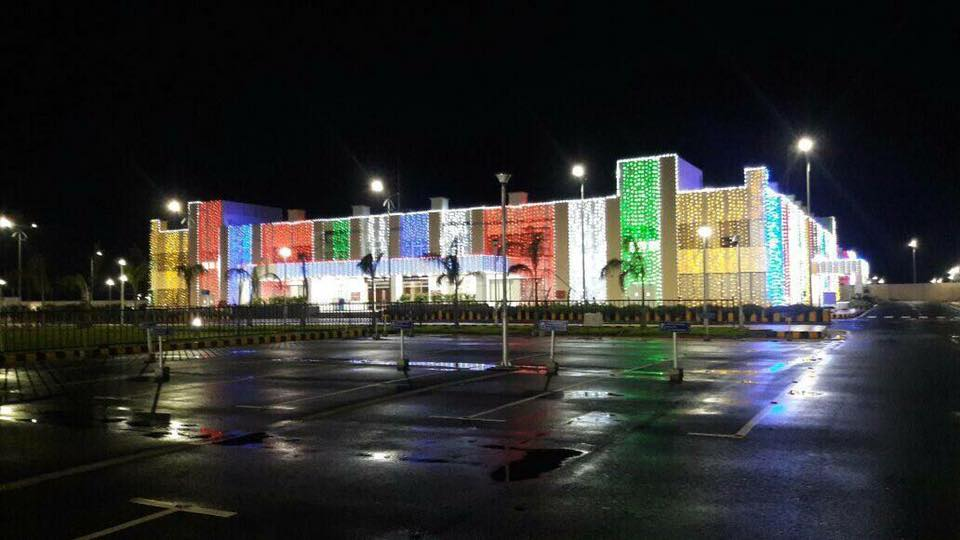
- Assembly Building; Amaravati, Andhra Pradesh, India

Overview
- Legislative body: Andhra Pradesh Legislature
- Term: 12 June 2019 – 5 June 2024
- Election: 2019 Andhra Pradesh Legislative Assembly election
- Government: Y. S. Jagan Mohan Reddy ministry

Nominal Executive
- Governor: S. Abdul Nazeer

Andhra Pradesh Legislative Assembly
- Members: 175
- Speaker: Thammineni Seetharam
- Deputy Speaker: Kolagatla Veerabhadra Swamy
- Leader of the House: Y. S. Jagan Mohan Reddy
- Chief Minister: Y. S. Jagan Mohan Reddy
- Leader of the Opposition: N. Chandrababu Naidu
- Party control: YSRCP

The fifteenth Legislative Assembly of Andhra Pradesh was formed by the members elected in the 2019 Andhra Pradesh Legislative Assembly election. Election to Andhra Pradesh Legislative Assembly took place in single phase on 11 April 2019 by the Election Commission of India. Counting started officially on the morning of 23 May 2019 and the results were declared on the same day.

== Composition ==
=== Presiding officers ===
As of June 2024
Designation	Name
Governor	Syed Abdul Nazeer
Speaker	Thammineni Seetharam (YSRCP)
Deputy Speaker	Kolagatla Veerabhadra Swamy (YSRCP)
Leader of the House	Y. S. Jagan Mohan Reddy (YSRCP)
Leader of the Opposition	N. Chandrababu Naidu (TDP)

=== Members ===
Party	Members as of	
Party	May 2019	June 2024
YSR Congress Party	151	135
Telugu Desam Party	23	23
Indian National Congress	0	4
Bharatiya Janata Party	0	2
Janasena Party	1	1
Vacant	0	10
Total	175	

== Members of Legislative Assembly ==
District	No.	Constituency	Name	Party	Remarks	
Srikakulam	1	Ichchapuram	Ashok Bendalam	Telugu Desam Party		
Srikakulam	2	Palasa	Seediri Appalaraju	YSR Congress Party	State Minister	
Srikakulam	3	Tekkali	Kinjarapu Atchannaidu	Telugu Desam Party		
Srikakulam	4	Pathapatnam	Reddy Shanthi	YSR Congress Party		
Srikakulam	5	Srikakulam	Dharmana Prasada Rao	YSR Congress Party	State Minister	
Srikakulam	6	Amadalavalasa	Thammineni Seetharam	YSR Congress Party	Assembly Speaker	
Srikakulam	7	Etcherla	Gorle Kiran Kumar	YSR Congress Party		
Srikakulam	8	Narasannapeta	Dharmana Krishna Das	YSR Congress Party	State Minister	
Srikakulam	9	Rajam (SC)	Kambala Jogulu	YSR Congress Party	State Minister	
Srikakulam	10	Palakonda (ST)	Viswasarayi Kalavathi	YSR Congress Party		
Vizianagaram	11	Kurupam (ST)	Pamula Pushpa Sreevani	YSR Congress Party	State Minister	
Vizianagaram	12	Parvathipuram (SC)	Alajangi Jogarao	YSR Congress Party		
Vizianagaram	13	Salur (ST)	Peedika Rajanna Dora	YSR Congress Party		
Vizianagaram	14	Bobbili	Sambangi Venkata China Appala Naidu	YSR Congress Party		
Vizianagaram	15	Cheepurupalli	Botcha Satyanarayana	YSR Congress Party	State Minister	
Vizianagaram	16	Gajapathinagaram	Botcha Appalanarasayya	YSR Congress Party		
Vizianagaram	17	Nellimarla	Baddukonda Appala Naidu	YSR Congress Party		
Vizianagaram	18	Vizianagaram	Kolagatla Veerabhadra Swamy	YSR Congress Party	Assembly Dept Speaker	
Vizianagaram	19	Srungavarapukota	Kadubandi Srinivasa Rao	YSR Congress Party		
Visakhapatnam	20	Bhimili	Muttamsetti Srinivasa Rao	YSR Congress Party	State Minister	
Visakhapatnam	21	Visakhapatnam East	Velagapudi Ramakrishna Babu	Telugu Desam Party		
Visakhapatnam	22	Visakhapatnam South	Vasupalli Ganesh Kumar	Telugu Desam Party	Defected to YSRCP in 2020, disqualified in 2024	
Visakhapatnam	22	Visakhapatnam South	Vasupalli Ganesh Kumar	YSR Congress Party	Defected to YSRCP in 2020, disqualified in 2024	
Visakhapatnam	22	Visakhapatnam South	Vacant		Defected to YSRCP in 2020, disqualified in 2024	
Visakhapatnam	23	Visakhapatnam North	Ganta Srinivasa Rao	Telugu Desam Party	Resigned in 2021, being accepted in 2024	
Visakhapatnam	23	Visakhapatnam North	Vacant		Resigned in 2021, being accepted in 2024	
Visakhapatnam	24	Visakhapatnam West	P. G. V. R. Naidu	Telugu Desam Party		
Visakhapatnam	25	Gajuwaka	Tippala Nagireddy	YSR Congress Party		
Visakhapatnam	26	Chodavaram	Karanam Dharmasri	YSR Congress Party		
Visakhapatnam	27	Madugula	Budi Mutyala Naidu	YSR Congress Party	State Minister	
Visakhapatnam	28	Araku Valley (ST)	Chetti Palguna	YSR Congress Party		
Visakhapatnam	29	Paderu (ST)	Kottagulli Bhagya Lakshmi	YSR Congress Party		
Visakhapatnam	30	Anakapalli	Gudivada Amarnath	YSR Congress Party	State Minister	
Visakhapatnam	31	Pendurthi	Annamreddy Adeep Raj	YSR Congress Party		
Visakhapatnam	32	Elamanchili	Uppalapati Venkata Ramanamurthy Raju	YSR Congress Party		
Visakhapatnam	33	Payakaraopet (SC)	Golla Babu Rao	YSR Congress Party	Elected to Rajya Sabha in 2024	
Visakhapatnam	33	Payakaraopet (SC)	Vacant		Elected to Rajya Sabha in 2024	
Visakhapatnam	34	Narsipatnam	Petla Uma Sankara Ganesh	YSR Congress Party		
East Godavari	35	Tuni	Dadisetti Raja	YSR Congress Party	State Minister	
East Godavari	36	Prathipadu (Kakinada)	Parvatha Purnachandra Prasad	YSR Congress Party		
East Godavari	37	Pithapuram	Dorababu Pendem	YSR Congress Party		
East Godavari	38	Kakinada Rural	Kurasala Kannababu	YSR Congress Party	State Minister	
East Godavari	39	Peddapuram	Nimmakayala Chinarajappa	Telugu Desam Party		
East Godavari	40	Anaparthy	Sathi Suryanarayana Reddy	YSR Congress Party		
East Godavari	41	Kakinada City	Dwarampudi Chandrasekhar Reddy	YSR Congress Party		
East Godavari	42	Ramachandrapuram	Chelluboyina Venugopala Krishna	YSR Congress Party	State Minister	
East Godavari	43	Mummidivaram	Ponnada Venkata Satish Kumar	YSR Congress Party		
East Godavari	44	Amalapuram (SC)	Pinipe Viswarup	YSR Congress Party	State Minister	
East Godavari	45	Razole (SC)	Rapaka Vara Prasada Rao	Jana Sena Party	Left JSP and extended support to YSRCP in 2020	
East Godavari	45	Razole (SC)	Rapaka Vara Prasada Rao	YSR Congress Party	Left JSP and extended support to YSRCP in 2020	
East Godavari	46	Gannavaram (Konaseema) (SC)	Kondeti Chittibabu	YSR Congress Party	Left YSRCP and joined INC in 2024	
East Godavari	46	Gannavaram (Konaseema) (SC)	Kondeti Chittibabu	Indian National Congress	Left YSRCP and joined INC in 2024	
East Godavari	47	Kothapeta	Chirla Jaggireddy	YSR Congress Party		
East Godavari	48	Mandapeta	V. Jogeswara Rao	Telugu Desam Party		
East Godavari	49	Rajanagaram	Jakkampudi Raja	YSR Congress Party		
East Godavari	50	Rajahmundry City	Adireddy Bhavani	Telugu Desam Party		
East Godavari	51	Rajahmundry Rural	Gorantla Butchaiah Chowdary	Telugu Desam Party		
East Godavari	52	Jaggampeta	Jyothula Chantibabu	YSR Congress Party		
East Godavari	53	Rampachodavaram (ST)	Nagulapalli Dhanalakshmi	YSR Congress Party		
West Godavari	54	Kovvur (SC)	Taneti Vanitha	YSR Congress Party	State Minister	
West Godavari	55	Nidadavole	Geddam Srinivas Naidu	YSR Congress Party		
West Godavari	56	Achanta	Cherukuvada Sri Ranganadha Raju	YSR Congress Party	State Minister	
West Godavari	57	Palakollu	Nimmala Rama Naidu	Telugu Desam Party		
West Godavari	58	Narasapuram	Mudunuri Prasada Raju	YSR Congress Party	Chief Whip	
West Godavari	59	Bhimavaram	Grandhi Srinivas	YSR Congress Party		
West Godavari	60	Undi	Mantena Rama Raju	Telugu Desam Party		
West Godavari	61	Tanuku	Karumuri Venkata Nageswara Rao	YSR Congress Party	State Minister	
West Godavari	62	Tadepalligudem	Kottu Satyanarayana	YSR Congress Party	State Minister	
West Godavari	63	Unguturu	Puppala Srinivasa Rao	YSR Congress Party		
West Godavari	64	Denduluru	Kotaru Abbaya Chowdary	YSR Congress Party		
West Godavari	65	Eluru	Alla Kali Krishna Srinivas	YSR Congress Party	State Minister	
West Godavari	66	Gopalapuram (SC)	Talari Venkatrao	YSR Congress Party		
West Godavari	67	Polavaram (ST)	Tellam Balaraju	YSR Congress Party		
West Godavari	68	Chintalapudi (SC)	Vunnamatla Eliza	YSR Congress Party	Left YSRCP and joined INC in 2024	
West Godavari	68	Chintalapudi (SC)	Vunnamatla Eliza	Indian National Congress	Left YSRCP and joined INC in 2024	
Krishna	69	Tiruvuru (SC)	Kokkiligadda Rakshana Nidhi	YSR Congress Party		
Krishna	70	Nuzvid	Meka Venkata Pratap Apparao	YSR Congress Party		
Krishna	71	Gannavaram (Krishna)	Vallabhaneni Vamsi Mohan	Telugu Desam Party	Defected to YSRCP in 2019, disqualified in 2024	
Krishna	71	Gannavaram (Krishna)	Vallabhaneni Vamsi Mohan	YSR Congress Party	Defected to YSRCP in 2019, disqualified in 2024	
Krishna	71	Gannavaram (Krishna)	Vacant		Defected to YSRCP in 2019, disqualified in 2024	
Krishna	72	Gudivada	Kodali Sri Venkateswara Rao	YSR Congress Party	State Minister	
Krishna	73	Kaikalur	Dulam Nageswara Rao	YSR Congress Party		
Krishna	74	Pedana	Jogi Ramesh	YSR Congress Party	State Minister	
Krishna	75	Machilipatnam	Perni Venkataramaiah	YSR Congress Party	State Minister	
Krishna	76	Avanigadda	Simhadri Ramesh Babu	YSR Congress Party		
Krishna	77	Pamarru (SC)	Kaile Anil Kumar	YSR Congress Party		
Krishna	78	Penamaluru	Kolusu Parthasarathy	YSR Congress Party	Left YSRCP and extended support to TDP in 2024	
Krishna	78	Penamaluru	Kolusu Parthasarathy	Telugu Desam Party	Left YSRCP and extended support to TDP in 2024	
Krishna	79	Vijayawada West	Vellampalli Srinivas	YSR Congress Party	State Minister	
Krishna	80	Vijayawada Central	Malladi Vishnu	YSR Congress Party		
Krishna	81	Vijayawada East	Gadde Ramamohan	Telugu Desam Party		
Krishna	82	Mylavaram	Vasantha Venkata Krishna Prasad	YSR Congress Party	Left YSRCP and extended support to TDP in 2024	
Krishna	82	Mylavaram	Vasantha Venkata Krishna Prasad	Telugu Desam Party	Left YSRCP and extended support to TDP in 2024	
Krishna	83	Nandigama (SC)	Monditoka Jagan Mohana Rao	YSR Congress Party		
Krishna	84	Jaggayyapeta	Samineni Udayabhanu	YSR Congress Party		
Guntur	85	Pedakurapadu	Namburu Sankara Rao	YSR Congress Party		
Guntur	86	Tadikonda (SC)	Undavalli Sridevi	YSR Congress Party	Defected to TDP in 2023, disqualified in 2024	
Guntur	86	Tadikonda (SC)	Undavalli Sridevi	Telugu Desam Party	Defected to TDP in 2023, disqualified in 2024	
Guntur	86	Tadikonda (SC)	Vacant		Defected to TDP in 2023, disqualified in 2024	
Guntur	87	Mangalagiri	Alla Ramakrishna Reddy	YSR Congress Party	Resigned in 2024, wasn't accepted	
Guntur	88	Ponnuru	Kilari Venkata Rosaiah	YSR Congress Party		
Guntur	89	Vemuru (SC)	Merugu Nagarjuna	YSR Congress Party	State Minister	
Guntur	90	Repalle	Anagani Satya Prasad	Telugu Desam Party		
Guntur	91	Tenali	Annabathuni Siva Kumar	YSR Congress Party		
Guntur	92	Bapatla	Kona Raghupathi	YSR Congress Party	Assembly Dept Speaker	
Guntur	93	Prathipadu (Guntur) (SC)	Mekathoti Sucharita	YSR Congress Party	State Minister	
Guntur	94	Guntur West	Maddali Giridhar Rao	Telugu Desam Party	Defected to YSRCP in 2019, disqualified in 2024	
Guntur	94	Guntur West	Maddali Giridhar Rao	YSR Congress Party	Defected to YSRCP in 2019, disqualified in 2024	
Guntur	94	Guntur West	Vacant		Defected to YSRCP in 2019, disqualified in 2024	
Guntur	95	Guntur East	Mohammad Musthafa Shaik	YSR Congress Party		
Guntur	96	Chilakaluripet	Vidadala Rajini	YSR Congress Party	State Minister	
Guntur	97	Narasaraopet	Gopireddy Srinivasa Reddy	YSR Congress Party		
Guntur	98	Sattenapalle	Ambati Rambabu	YSR Congress Party	State Minister	
Guntur	99	Vinukonda	Bolla Brahma Naidu	YSR Congress Party		
Guntur	100	Gurazala	Kasu Mahesh Reddy	YSR Congress Party		
Guntur	101	Macherla	Ramakrishna Reddy Pinnelli	YSR Congress Party		
Prakasam	102	Yerragondapalem (SC)	Audimulapu Suresh	YSR Congress Party	State Minister	
Prakasam	103	Darsi	Maddisetty Venugopal	YSR Congress Party		
Prakasam	104	Parchur	Yeluri Sambasiva Rao	Telugu Desam Party		
Prakasam	105	Addanki	Gottipati Ravi Kumar	Telugu Desam Party		
Prakasam	106	Chirala	Karanam Balaram Krishna Murthy	Telugu Desam Party	Defected to YSRCP in 2020, disqualified in 2024	
Prakasam	106	Chirala	Karanam Balaram Krishna Murthy	YSR Congress Party	Defected to YSRCP in 2020, disqualified in 2024	
Prakasam	106	Chirala	Vacant		Defected to YSRCP in 2020, disqualified in 2024	
Prakasam	107	Santhanuthalapadu (SC)	T. J. R. Sudhakar Babu	YSR Congress Party		
Prakasam	108	Ongole	Balineni Srinivasa Reddy	YSR Congress Party	State Minister	
Prakasam	109	Kandukur	Manugunta Maheedhar Reddy	YSR Congress Party		
Prakasam	110	Kondapi (SC)	Dola Sree Bala Veeranjaneya Swamy	Telugu Desam Party		
Prakasam	111	Markapuram	Kunduru Nagarjuna Reddy	YSR Congress Party		
Prakasam	112	Giddalur	Anna Rambabu	YSR Congress Party		
Prakasam	113	Kanigiri	Burra Madhusudan Yadav	YSR Congress Party		
Nellore	114	Kavali	Ramireddy Pratap Kumar Reddy	YSR Congress Party		
Nellore	115	Atmakur	Mekapati Goutham Reddy	YSR Congress Party	State Minister Died on 21 February 2022	
Nellore	115	Atmakur	Mekapati Vikram Reddy	YSR Congress Party	Elected in 2022	
Nellore	116	Kovur	Nallapareddy Prasanna Kumar Reddy	YSR Congress Party		
Nellore	117	Nellore City	Anil Kumar Poluboina	YSR Congress Party	State Minister	
Nellore	118	Nellore Rural	Kotamreddy Sridhar Reddy	YSR Congress Party	Defected to TDP in 2023, disqualified in 2024	
Nellore	118	Nellore Rural	Kotamreddy Sridhar Reddy	Telugu Desam Party	Defected to TDP in 2023, disqualified in 2024	
Nellore	118	Nellore Rural	Vacant		Defected to TDP in 2023, disqualified in 2024	
Nellore	119	Sarvepalli	Kakani Govardhan Reddy	YSR Congress Party	State Minister	
Nellore	120	Gudur (SC)	Velagapalli Varaprasad Rao	YSR Congress Party	Left YSRCP and extended support to BJP in 2024	
Nellore	120	Gudur (SC)	Velagapalli Varaprasad Rao	Bharatiya Janata Party	Left YSRCP and extended support to BJP in 2024	
Nellore	121	Sullurpeta (SC)	Kiliveti Sanjeevaiah	YSR Congress Party		
Nellore	122	Venkatagiri	Anam Ramanarayana Reddy	YSR Congress Party	Defected to TDP in 2023, disqualified in 2024	
Nellore	122	Venkatagiri	Anam Ramanarayana Reddy	Telugu Desam Party	Defected to TDP in 2023, disqualified in 2024	
Nellore	122	Venkatagiri	Vacant		Defected to TDP in 2023, disqualified in 2024	
Nellore	123	Udayagiri	Mekapati Chandra Sekhar Reddy	YSR Congress Party	Defected to TDP in 2023, disqualified in 2024	
Nellore	123	Udayagiri	Mekapati Chandra Sekhar Reddy	Telugu Desam Party	Defected to TDP in 2023, disqualified in 2024	
Nellore	123	Udayagiri	Vacant		Defected to TDP in 2023, disqualified in 2024	
Kadapa	124	Badvel (SC)	Gunthoti Venkata Subbaiah	YSR Congress Party	Died on 28 March 2021	
Kadapa	124	Badvel (SC)	Dasari Sudha	YSR Congress Party	Elected in 2021	
Kadapa	125	Rajampet	Meda Venkata Mallikarjuna Reddy	YSR Congress Party		
Kadapa	126	Kadapa	Amzath Basha Shaik Bepari	YSR Congress Party	State Minister	
Kadapa	127	Kodur (SC)	Koramutla Sreenivasulu	YSR Congress Party		
Kadapa	128	Rayachoti	Gadikota Srikanth Reddy	YSR Congress Party	Chief Whip	
Kadapa	129	Pulivendula	Y. S. Jagan Mohan Reddy	YSR Congress Party	Chief Minister of Andhra Pradesh	
Kadapa	130	Kamalapuram	Pochimareddy Ravindranath Reddy	YSR Congress Party		
Kadapa	131	Jammalamadugu	Mule Sudheer Reddy	YSR Congress Party		
Kadapa	132	Proddatur	Rachamallu Siva Prasad Reddy	YSR Congress Party		
Kadapa	133	Mydukur	Raghuramireddy Settipalli	YSR Congress Party		
Kurnool	134	Allagadda	Gangula Brijendra Reddy	YSR Congress Party		
Kurnool	135	Srisailam	Silpa Chakrapani Reddy	YSR Congress Party		
Kurnool	136	Nandikotkur (SC)	Thoguru Arthur	YSR Congress Party	Left YSRCP and joined INC in 2024	
Kurnool	136	Nandikotkur (SC)	Thoguru Arthur	Indian National Congress	Left YSRCP and joined INC in 2024	
Kurnool	137	Kurnool	Abdul Hafeez Khan	YSR Congress Party		
Kurnool	138	Panyam	Katasani Rambhupal Reddy	YSR Congress Party		
Kurnool	139	Nandyal	Shilpa Ravi Chandra Kishore Reddy	YSR Congress Party		
Kurnool	140	Banaganapalle	Katasani Rami Reddy	YSR Congress Party		
Kurnool	141	Dhone	Buggana Rajendranath	YSR Congress Party	State Minister	
Kurnool	142	Pattikonda	Kangati Sreedevi	YSR Congress Party		
Kurnool	143	Kodumur (SC)	Jaradoddi Sudhakar	YSR Congress Party		
Kurnool	144	Yemmiganur	K. Chenna Kesava Reddy	YSR Congress Party		
Kurnool	145	Mantralayam	Y. Balanagi Reddy	YSR Congress Party		
Kurnool	146	Adoni	Y. Sai Prasad Reddy	YSR Congress Party		
Kurnool	147	Alur	Gummanur Jayaram	YSR Congress Party	rowspan="2"	State Minister Left YSRCP and extended support to TDP in 2024
Kurnool	147	Alur	Gummanur Jayaram	Telugu Desam Party		
Anantapur	148	Rayadurg	Kapu Ramachandra Reddy	YSR Congress Party	Left YSRCP in 2024 to join BJP	
Anantapur	148	Rayadurg	Kapu Ramachandra Reddy	Bharatiya Janata Party	Left YSRCP in 2024 to join BJP	
Anantapur	149	Uravakonda	Payyavula Keshav	Telugu Desam Party		
Anantapur	150	Guntakal	Y. Venkatarama Reddy	YSR Congress Party		
Anantapur	151	Tadipatri	K. Pedda Reddy	YSR Congress Party		
Anantapur	152	Singanamala (SC)	Jonnalagadda Padmavathy	YSR Congress Party		
Anantapur	153	Anantapur Urban	Anantha Venkatarami Reddy	YSR Congress Party		
Anantapur	154	Kalyandurg	K. V. Ushashri Charan	YSR Congress Party	State Minister	
Anantapur	155	Raptadu	Thopudurthi Prakash Reddy	YSR Congress Party		
Anantapur	156	Madakasira (SC)	M. Thippeswamy	YSR Congress Party		
Anantapur	157	Hindupur	Nandamuri Balakrishna	Telugu Desam Party		
Anantapur	158	Penukonda	Malagundla Sankaranarayana	YSR Congress Party	State Minister	
Anantapur	159	Puttaparthi	Duddukunta Sreedhar Reddy	YSR Congress Party		
Anantapur	160	Dharmavaram	Kethireddy Venkatarami Reddy	YSR Congress Party		
Anantapur	161	Kadiri	P. V. Sidda Reddy	YSR Congress Party		
Chittoor	162	Thamballapalle	Peddireddi Dwarakanatha Reddy	YSR Congress Party		
Chittoor	163	Pileru	Chintala Ramachandra Reddy	YSR Congress Party		
Chittoor	164	Madanapalle	Mohammed Nawaz Basha	YSR Congress Party		
Chittoor	165	Punganur	Peddireddy Ramachandra Reddy	YSR Congress Party	State Minister	
Chittoor	166	Chandragiri	Chevireddy Bhaskar Reddy	YSR Congress Party		
Chittoor	167	Tirupati	Bhumana Karunakar Reddy	YSR Congress Party		
Chittoor	168	Srikalahasti	Biyyapu Madhusudhan Reddy	YSR Congress Party		
Chittoor	169	Satyavedu (SC)	Adimulam Koneti	YSR Congress Party	Left YSRCP and extended support to TDP in 2024	
Chittoor	169	Satyavedu (SC)	Adimulam Koneti	Telugu Desam Party	Left YSRCP and extended support to TDP in 2024	
Chittoor	170	Nagari	R. K. Roja	YSR Congress Party	State Minister	
Chittoor	171	Gangadhara Nellore (SC)	K. Narayana Swamy	YSR Congress Party	State Minister	
Chittoor	172	Chittoor	Arani Srinivasulu	YSR Congress Party	Left YSRCP and extended support to JSP in 2024	
Chittoor	172	Chittoor	Arani Srinivasulu	Jana Sena Party	Left YSRCP and extended support to JSP in 2024	
Chittoor	173	Puthalapattu (SC)	M. S. Babu	YSR Congress Party	Left YSRCP and joined INC in 2024	
Chittoor	173	Puthalapattu (SC)	M. S. Babu	Indian National Congress	Left YSRCP and joined INC in 2024	
Chittoor	174	Palamaner	N. Venkate Gowda	YSR Congress Party		
Chittoor	175	Kuppam	N. Chandrababu Naidu	Telugu Desam Party	Leader of the Opposition in the Andhra Pradesh Legislative Assembly	

== See also ==
- Andhra Pradesh Legislature
