= Department of Animal Husbandry, Dairy Development and Fisheries (Andhra Pradesh) =

Minister of Animal Husbandry, Dairy Development and Fisheries
- Paśusanrakṣaṇa, Pāḍi Pariśrama Abhivr̥d'dhi mariyu Matsya Sampada Śākha Mantrī
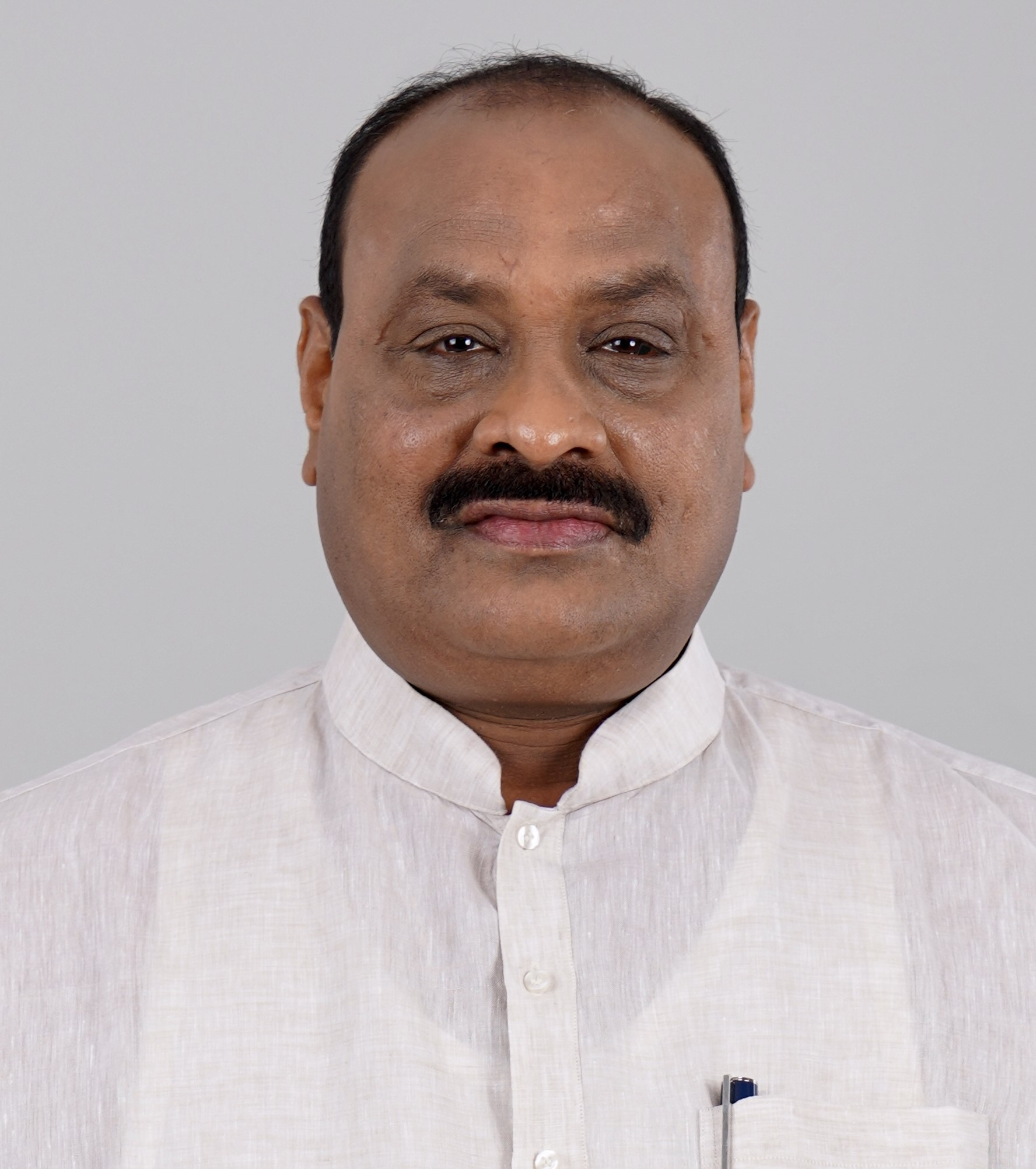
- Incumbent; Kinjarapu Atchannaidu since 12 June 2024
- Department of Animal Husbandry, Dairy Development & Fisheries
- Member of: Andha Pradesh Cabinet
- Reports to: Governor of Andhra Pradesh; Chief Minister of Andhra Pradesh; Andhra Pradesh Legislature
- Appointer: Governor of Andhra Pradesh on the advice of the chief minister of Andhra Pradesh
- Inaugural holder: Prathipati Pulla Rao
- Formation: 8 June 2014
- Website: Official website

The Minister of Animal Husbandry, Dairy Development and Fisheries, is the head of the Department of Animal Husbandry, Dairy Development & Fisheries of the Government of Andhra Pradesh.

The incumbent Minister of Animal Husbandry, Dairy Development & Fisheries is Kinjarapu Atchannaidu from the Telugu Desam Party.

== List of ministers ==
| # | Portrait | Minister (Lifespan) Constituency | Term of office | | | Election (Term) | Party | Ministry | Chief Minister | Ref. |
| # | Portrait | Minister (Lifespan) Constituency | Term start | Term end | Duration | Election (Term) | Party | Ministry | Chief Minister | Ref. |
|---|---|---|---|---|---|---|---|---|---|---|
| 1 | | Prathipati Pulla Rao (born 1958); MLA for Chilakaluripet | 8 June 2014 | 1 April 2017 | 2 years, 297 days | 2014 (14th) | Telugu Desam Party | Naidu III | N. Chandrababu Naidu | |
| 2 | | Chadipiralla Adinarayana Reddy (born 1958); MLA for Jammalamadugu | 2 April 2017 | 29 May 2019 | 2 years, 57 days | 2014 (14th) | Telugu Desam Party | Naidu III | N. Chandrababu Naidu | |
| 3 | | Mopidevi Venkataramana (born 1962); MLC | 30 May 2019 | 1 July 2020 | 1 year, 32 days | 2019 (15th) | YSR Congress Party | Jagan | Y. S. Jagan Mohan Reddy | |
| 4 | | Seediri Appalaraju (born 1981); MLA for Palasa | 22 July 2020 | 11 June 2024 | 3 years, 325 days | 2019 (15th) | YSR Congress Party | Jagan | Y. S. Jagan Mohan Reddy | |
| 5 | | Kinjarapu Atchannaidu (born 1969); MLA for Tekkali | 12 June 2024 | Incumbent | 2 years, 87 days | 2024 (16th) | Telugu Desam Party | Naidu IV | N. Chandrababu Naidu | |
