= Department of Minority Welfare (Andhra Pradesh) =

Head of the Ministry of Minority Welfare of the Government of Andhra Pradesh

Minister of Minority Welfare
- Maināriṭī Saṅkṣēma Śākha Mantrī
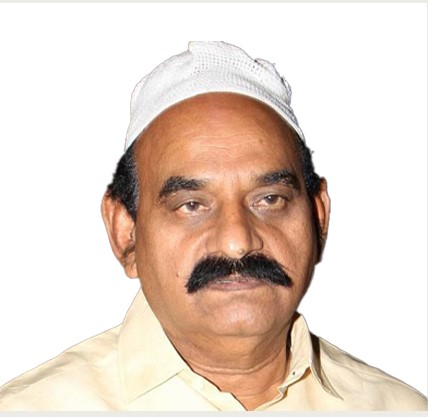
- Incumbent; N. M. D. Farooq since 12 June 2024
- Department of Minority Welfare
- Member of: Andha Pradesh Cabinet
- Reports to: Governor of Andhra Pradesh; Chief Minister of Andhra Pradesh; Andhra Pradesh Legislature
- Appointer: Governor of Andhra Pradesh on the advice of the chief minister of Andhra Pradesh
- Inaugural holder: Palle Raghunatha Reddy
- Formation: 8 June 2014

The Minister of Minority Welfare is the head of the Department of Minority Welfare of the Government of Andhra Pradesh.

The incumbent Minister of Minority Welfare is N. M. D. Farooq from the Telugu Desam Party.

== List of ministers ==
| # | Portrait | Minister (Lifespan) Constituency | Term of office | | | Election (Term) | Party | Ministry | Chief Minister | Ref. |
| # | Portrait | Minister (Lifespan) Constituency | Term start | Term end | Duration | Election (Term) | Party | Ministry | Chief Minister | Ref. |
|---|---|---|---|---|---|---|---|---|---|---|
| 1 | | Palle Raghunatha Reddy MLA for Puttaparthi | 8 June 2014 | 1 April 2017 | 2 years, 297 days | 2014 (14th) | Telugu Desam Party | Naidu III | N. Chandrababu Naidu | |
| – | | N. Chandrababu Naidu (born 1950); MLA for Kuppam (Chief Minister) | 2 April 2017 | 10 November 2018 | 1 year, 222 days | 2014 (14th) | Telugu Desam Party | Naidu III | N. Chandrababu Naidu | |
| 2 | | N. M. D. Farooq (born 1950); MLC | 11 November 2018 | 29 May 2019 | 199 days | 2014 (14th) | Telugu Desam Party | Naidu III | N. Chandrababu Naidu | |
| 3 | | Amzath Basha Shaik Bepari MLA for Kadapa | 30 May 2019 | 11 June 2024 | 5 years, 12 days | 2019 (15th) | YSR Congress Party | Jagan | Y. S. Jagan Mohan Reddy | |
| (2) | | N. M. D. Farooq (born 1950); MLA for Nandyal | 12 June 2024 | Incumbent | 2 years, 87 days | 2024 (16th) | Telugu Desam Party | Naidu IV | N. Chandrababu Naidu | |
