= Department of Cinematography =

Head of the Ministry of Cinematography of the Government of Andhra Pradesh

Minister of Cinematography
- Sinimāṭōgraphī Śākha Mantrī
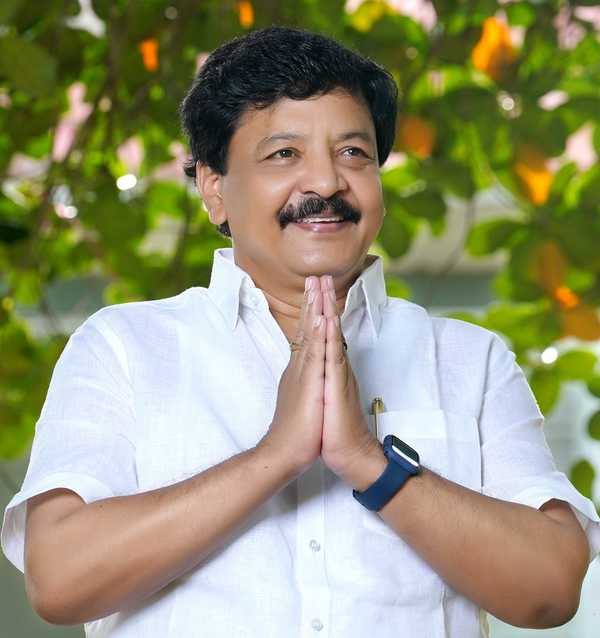
- Incumbent; Kandula Durgesh since 12 June 2024
- Department of Cinematography
- Member of: Andha Pradesh Cabinet
- Reports to: Governor of Andhra Pradesh; Chief Minister of Andhra Pradesh; Andhra Pradesh Legislature
- Appointer: Governor of Andhra Pradesh on the advice of the chief minister of Andhra Pradesh
- Inaugural holder: N. Chandrababu Naidu
- Formation: 8 June 2014
- Website: Official website

The Minister of Cinematography, is the head of the Department of Cinematography of the Government of Andhra Pradesh.

The incumbent minister of the Cinematography department is the Kandula Durgesh from Janasena Party.

== List of ministers ==
#	Portrait	Minister (Lifespan) Constituency	Term of office			Election (Term)	Party	Ministry	Chief Minister	Ref.
#	Portrait	Minister (Lifespan) Constituency	Term start	Term end	Duration	Election (Term)	Party	Ministry	Chief Minister	Ref.
–		N. Chandrababu Naidu (born 1950); MLA for Kuppam (Chief Minister)	8 June 2014	10 November 2018	4 years, 155 days	2014 (14th)	Telugu Desam Party	Naidu III	N. Chandrababu Naidu	
1		Nakka Ananda Babu (born 1966); MLA for Vemuru	11 November 2018	29 May 2019	199 days	2014 (14th)	Telugu Desam Party	Naidu III	N. Chandrababu Naidu	
2		Perni Venkataramaiah (born 1967); MLA for Machilipatnam	30 May 2019	7 April 2022	2 years, 312 days	2019 (15th)	YSR Congress Party	Jagan	Y. S. Jagan Mohan Reddy	
3		Chelluboyina Srinivasa Venugopalakrishna (born 1962); MLA for Ramachandrapuram	11 April 2022	11 June 2024	2 years, 61 days	2019 (15th)	YSR Congress Party	Jagan	Y. S. Jagan Mohan Reddy	
4		Kandula Durgesh (born 1960); MLA for Nidadavole	12 June 2024	Incumbent	2 years, 87 days	2024 (16th)	Janasena Party	Naidu IV	N. Chandrababu Naidu	
