= Department of Co-operation (Andhra Pradesh) =

Head of the Ministry of Co-operation of the Government of Andhra Pradesh

Minister of Co-operation
- Sahakāra Śākha Mantrī
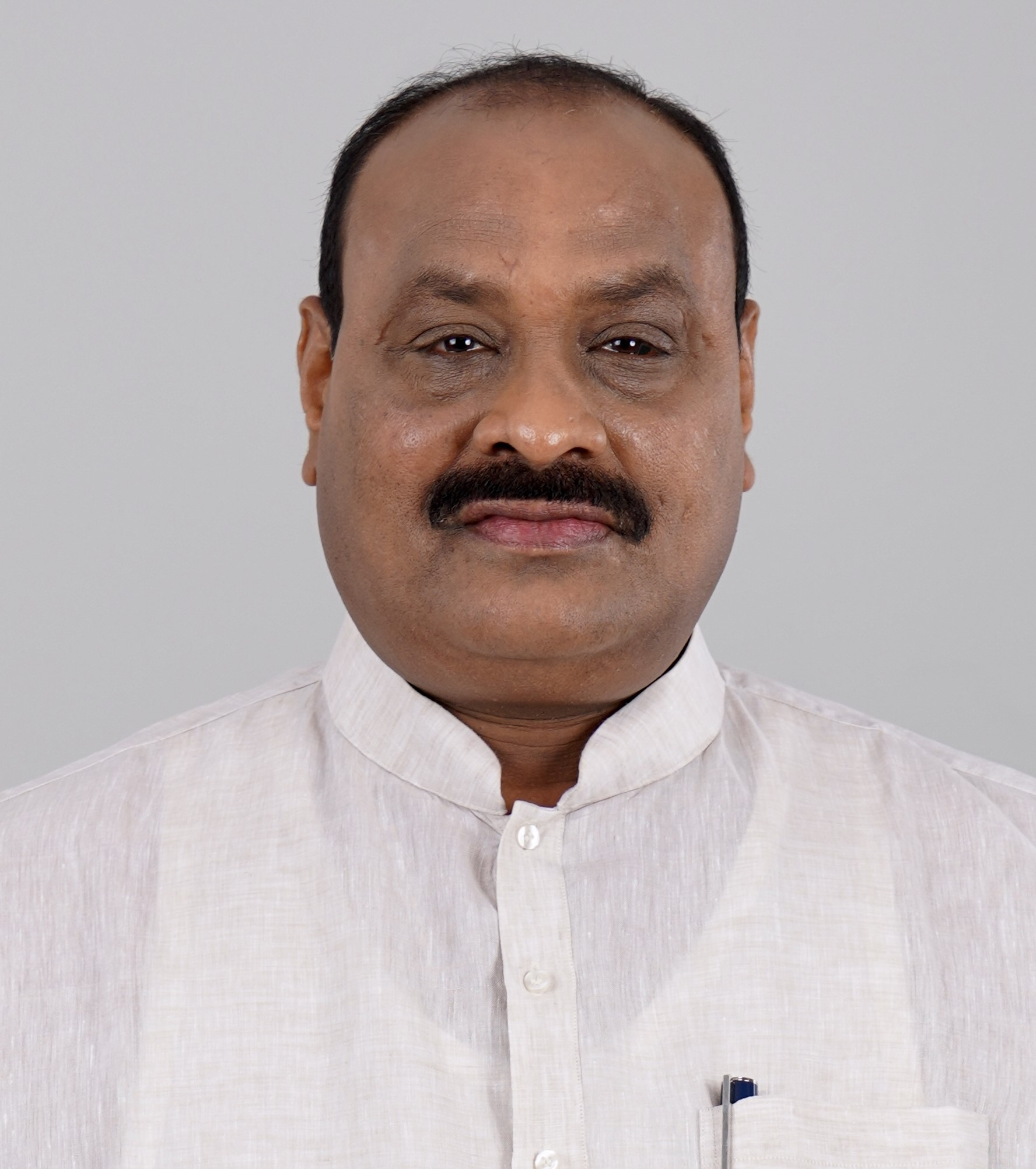
- Incumbent; Kinjarapu Atchannaidu since 12 June 2024
- Department of Co-operation
- Member of: Andha Pradesh Cabinet
- Reports to: Governor of Andhra Pradesh; Chief Minister of Andhra Pradesh; Andhra Pradesh Legislature
- Appointer: Governor of Andhra Pradesh on the advice of the chief minister of Andhra Pradesh
- Inaugural holder: Bojjala Gopala Krishna Reddy
- Formation: 8 June 2014
- Website: Official website

The Minister of Co-operation, is the head of the Department of Co-operation or Co-operatives of the Government of Andhra Pradesh.

The incumbent Minister of Co-operation is Kinjarapu Atchannaidu from the Telugu Desam Party.

== List of ministers ==
#	Portrait	Minister (Lifespan) Constituency	Term of office			Election (Term)	Party	Ministry	Chief Minister	Ref.
#	Portrait	Minister (Lifespan) Constituency	Term start	Term end	Duration	Election (Term)	Party	Ministry	Chief Minister	Ref.
1		Bojjala Gopala Krishna Reddy (1949-2022); MLA for Srikalahasti	8 June 2014	1 April 2017	2 years, 297 days	2014 (14th)	Telugu Desam Party	Naidu III	N. Chandrababu Naidu	
2		Chadipiralla Adinarayana Reddy (born 1958); MLA for Jammalamadugu	2 April 2017	29 May 2019	2 years, 57 days	2014 (14th)	Telugu Desam Party	Naidu III	N. Chandrababu Naidu	
3		Kurasala Kannababu (born 1970); MLA for Kakinada Rural	30 May 2019	7 April 2022	2 years, 312 days	2019 (15th)	YSR Congress Party	Jagan	Y. S. Jagan Mohan Reddy	
4		Kakani Govardhan Reddy (born 1964); MLA for Sarvepalli	11 April 2022	11 June 2024	2 years, 61 days	2019 (15th)	YSR Congress Party	Jagan	Y. S. Jagan Mohan Reddy	
5		Kinjarapu Atchannaidu (born 1969); MLA for Tekkali	12 June 2024	Incumbent	2 years, 87 days	2024 (16th)	Telugu Desam Party	Naidu IV	N. Chandrababu Naidu	
