= List of ministers of revenue, registration, and stamps of Andhra Pradesh =

Indian state govcernment ministers

Minister of Revenue, Registration and Stamps
- Ādāyapu, Namōdu mariyu Sṭāmpula Śākha Mantrī
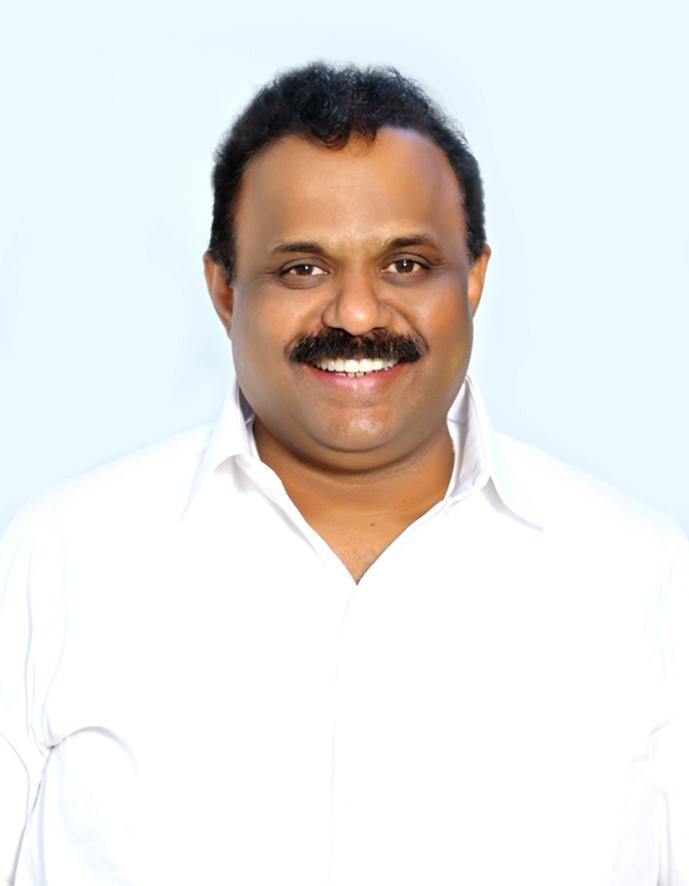
- Incumbent; Anagani Satya Prasad since 12 June 2024
- Department of Revenue, Registration and Stamps
- Member of: Andha Pradesh Cabinet
- Reports to: Governor of Andhra Pradesh; Chief Minister of Andhra Pradesh; Andhra Pradesh Legislature
- Appointer: Governor of Andhra Pradesh on the advice of the chief minister of Andhra Pradesh
- Inaugural holder: K. E. Krishna Murthy
- Formation: 8 June 2014
- Website: Official website

The Minister of Revenue, Registration and Stamps is the head of the Department of Revenue, Registration & Stamps of the Government of Andhra Pradesh.

The incumbent Minister of Revenue, Registration & Stamps is Anagani Satya Prasad from the Telugu Desam Party.

== List of ministers ==
#	Portrait	Minister (Lifespan) Constituency	Term of office			Election (Term)	Party	Ministry	Chief Minister	Ref.
#	Portrait	Minister (Lifespan) Constituency	Term start	Term end	Duration	Election (Term)	Party	Ministry	Chief Minister	Ref.
1		K. E. Krishna Murthy (born 1938); MLA for Pattikonda	8 June 2014	29 May 2019	4 years, 355 days	2014 (14th)	Telugu Desam Party	Naidu III	N. Chandrababu Naidu	
2		Pilli Subhash Chandra Bose (born 1950); MLC	30 May 2019	1 July 2020	1 year, 32 days	2019 (15th)	YSR Congress Party	Jagan	Y. S. Jagan Mohan Reddy	
3		Dharmana Krishna Das (born 1954); MLA for Narasannapeta	23 July 2020	7 April 2022	1 year, 258 days	2019 (15th)	YSR Congress Party	Jagan	Y. S. Jagan Mohan Reddy	
4		Dharmana Prasada Rao (born 1958); MLA for Srikakulam	11 April 2022	11 June 2024	2 years, 61 days	2019 (15th)	YSR Congress Party	Jagan	Y. S. Jagan Mohan Reddy	
5		Anagani Satya Prasad (born 1972); MLA for Repalle	12 June 2024	Incumbent	2 years, 87 days	2024 (16th)	Telugu Desam Party	Naidu IV	N. Chandrababu Naidu	
