= List of ministers of information and public relations of Andhra Pradesh =

Minister of Information and Public Relations
- Samācāra mariyu Paura Sambandhāla Śākha Mantrī
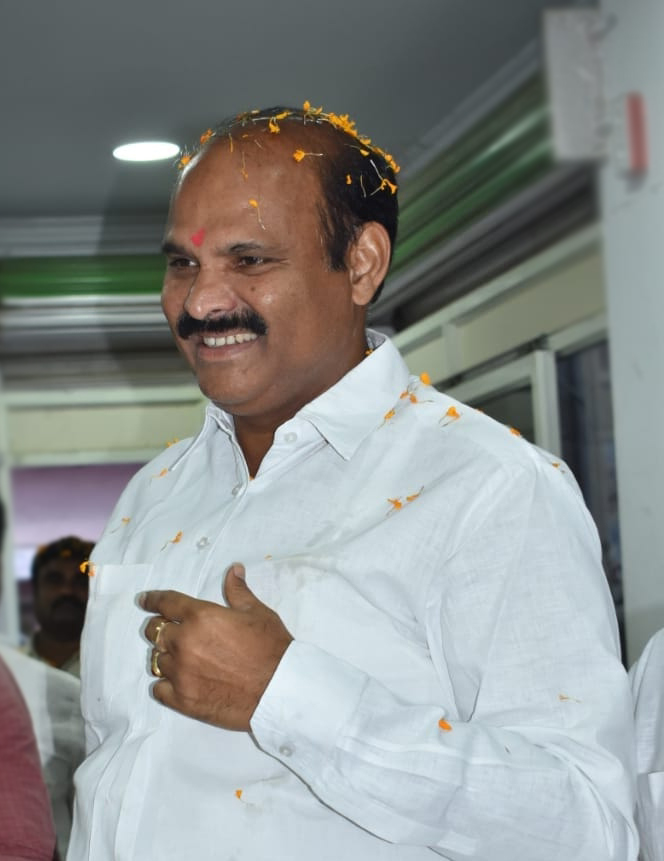
- Incumbent; Kolusu Parthasarathy since 12 June 2024
- Department of Information and Public Relations
- Abbreviation: I&PR
- Member of: Andha Pradesh Cabinet
- Reports to: Governor of Andhra Pradesh; Chief Minister of Andhra Pradesh; Andhra Pradesh Legislature
- Appointer: Governor of Andhra Pradesh on the advice of the chief minister of Andhra Pradesh
- Inaugural holder: Palle Raghunatha Reddy
- Formation: 8 June 2014

The Minister of Information and Public Relations, is the head of the Department of Information & Public Relations of the Government of Andhra Pradesh.

The incumbent Minister of Information & Public Relations is Kolusu Parthasarathy from the Telugu Desam Party.

== List of ministers ==
#	Portrait	Minister (Lifespan) Constituency	Term of office			Election (Term)	Party	Ministry	Chief Minister	Ref.
#	Portrait	Minister (Lifespan) Constituency	Term start	Term end	Duration	Election (Term)	Party	Ministry	Chief Minister	Ref.
1		Palle Raghunatha Reddy MLA for Puttaparthi	8 June 2014	1 April 2017	2 years, 297 days	2014 (14th)	Telugu Desam Party	Naidu III	N. Chandrababu Naidu	
2		Kalava Srinivasulu (born 1964); MLA for Rayadurg	2 April 2017	29 May 2019	2 years, 57 days	2014 (14th)	Telugu Desam Party	Naidu III	N. Chandrababu Naidu	
3		Perni Venkataramaiah (born 1967); MLA for Machilipatnam	30 May 2019	7 April 2022	2 years, 312 days	2019 (15th)	YSR Congress Party	Jagan	Y. S. Jagan Mohan Reddy	
4		Chelluboyina Srinivasa Venugopalakrishna (born 1962); MLA for Ramachandrapuram	11 April 2022	11 June 2024	2 years, 61 days	2019 (15th)	YSR Congress Party	Jagan	Y. S. Jagan Mohan Reddy	
5		Kolusu Parthasarathy (born 1965); MLA for Nuzvid	12 June 2024	Incumbent	2 years, 87 days	2024 (16th)	Telugu Desam Party	Naidu IV	N. Chandrababu Naidu	
