= List of ministers of commercial taxes of Andhra Pradesh =

Head of the Ministry of Commercial Taxes of the Government of Andhra Pradesh

Minister of Commercial Taxes
- Vāṇijya Pannula Śākha Mantrī
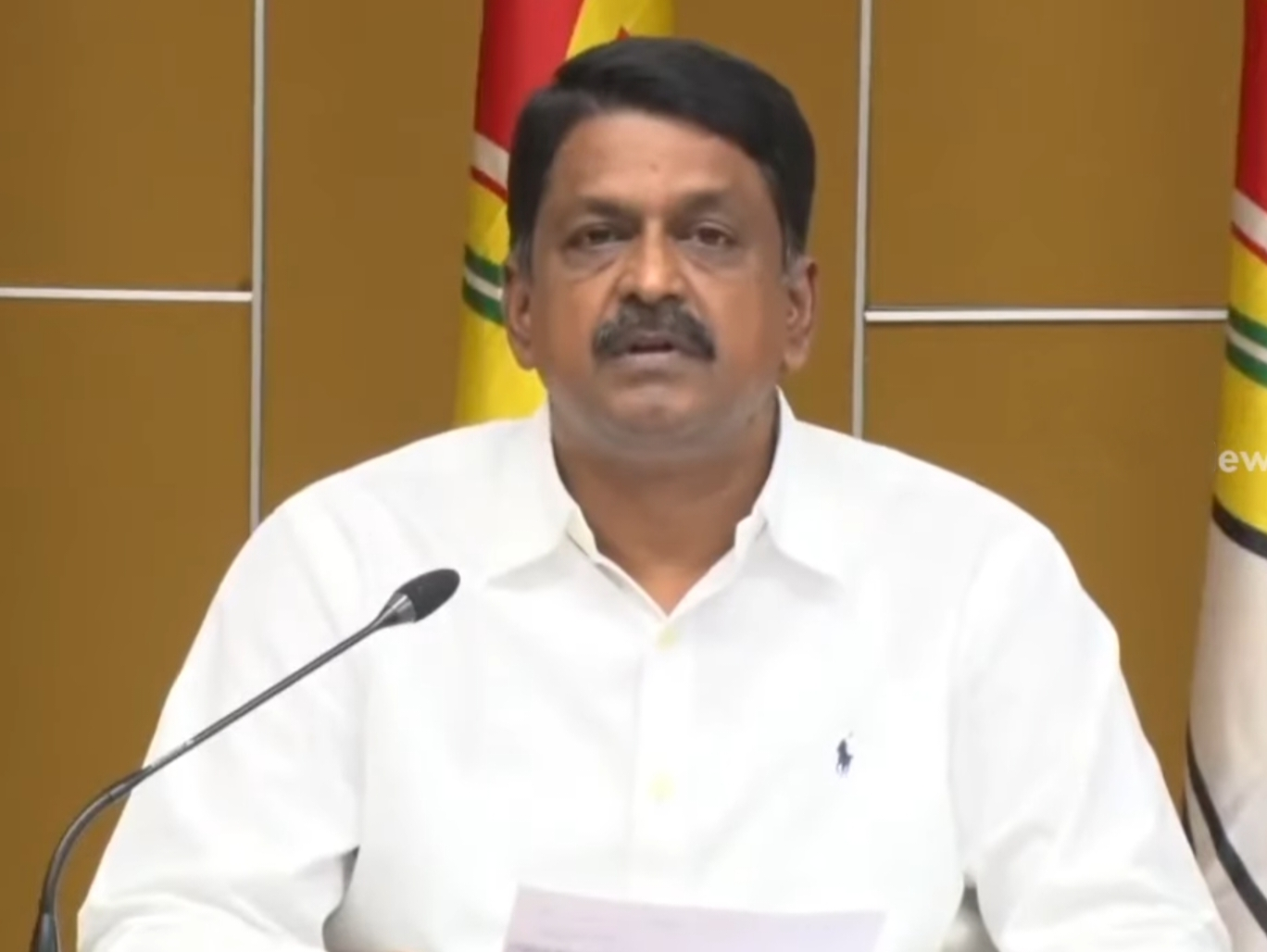
- Incumbent; Payyavula Keshav since 12 June 2024
- Department of Commercial Taxes
- Member of: Andha Pradesh Cabinet
- Reports to: Governor of Andhra Pradesh; Chief Minister of Andhra Pradesh; Andhra Pradesh Legislature
- Appointer: Governor of Andhra Pradesh on the advice of the chief minister of Andhra Pradesh
- Inaugural holder: Yanamala Rama Krishnudu
- Formation: 8 June 2014
- Website: Official website

The Minister of Commercial Taxes is the head of the Department of Commercial Taxes of the Government of Andhra Pradesh.

From June 2014 to May 2019, the Commercial Taxes Minister of Andhra Pradesh was Yanamala Rama Krishnudu from the Telugu Desam Party. Following the cabinet formation on 12 June 2024, Payyavula Keshav assumed the office under the Chief Ministership of N. Chandrababu Naidu.

== List of ministers ==
#	Portrait	Minister (Lifespan) Constituency	Term of office			Election (Term)	Party	Ministry	Chief Minister	Ref.
#	Portrait	Minister (Lifespan) Constituency	Term start	Term end	Duration	Election (Term)	Party	Ministry	Chief Minister	Ref.
1		Yanamala Rama Krishnudu (born 1951); MLC	8 June 2014	29 May 2019	4 years, 355 days	2014 (14th)	Telugu Desam Party	Naidu III	N. Chandrababu Naidu	
2		K. Narayana Swamy (born 1949); MLA for Gangadhara Nellore	8 June 2019	29 October 2021	2 years, 143 days	2019 (15th)	YSR Congress Party	Jagan	Y. S. Jagan Mohan Reddy	
3		Buggana Rajendranath Reddy (born 1970); MLA for Dhone	30 October 2021	8 June 2024	2 years, 222 days	2019 (15th)	YSR Congress Party	Jagan	Y. S. Jagan Mohan Reddy	
4		Payyavula Keshav (born 1965); MLA for Uravakonda	12 June 2024	Incumbent	2 years, 87 days	2024 (16th)	Telugu Desam Party	Naidu IV	N. Chandrababu Naidu	
