= Department of Tourism (Andhra Pradesh) =

Head of the Ministry of Tourism of the Government of Andhra Pradesh

Minister of Tourism
- Paryāṭaka Śākha Mantrī
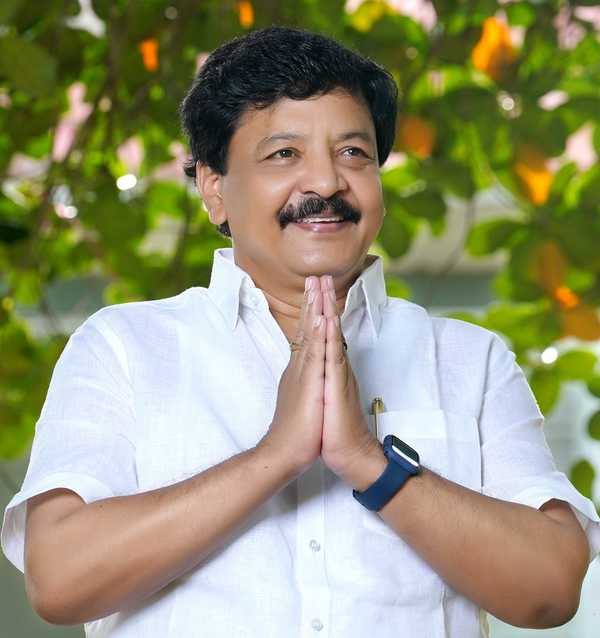
- Incumbent; Kandula Durgesh since 12 June 2024
- Department of Tourism
- Member of: Andha Pradesh Cabinet
- Reports to: Governor of Andhra Pradesh; Chief Minister of Andhra Pradesh; Andhra Pradesh Legislature
- Appointer: Governor of Andhra Pradesh on the advice of the Chief Minister of Andhra Pradesh
- Inaugural holder: N. Chandrababu Naidu
- Formation: 8 June 2014
- Website: Official website

The Minister of Tourism, is the head of the Department of Tourism of the Government of Andhra Pradesh.

The incumbent minister of the Tourism department is the Kandula Durgesh from Janasena Party.

== List of ministers ==
#	Portrait	Minister (Lifespan) Constituency	Term of office			Election (Term)	Party	Ministry	Chief Minister	Ref.
#	Portrait	Minister (Lifespan) Constituency	Term start	Term end	Duration	Election (Term)	Party	Ministry	Chief Minister	Ref.
–		N. Chandrababu Naidu (born 1950); MLA for Kuppam	8 June 2014	1 April 2017	2 years, 297 days	2014 (14th)	Telugu Desam Party	Naidu III	N. Chandrababu Naidu	
1		Bhuma Akhila Priya (born 1987); MLA for Allagadda	2 April 2017	29 May 2019	2 years, 57 days	2014 (14th)	Telugu Desam Party	Naidu III	N. Chandrababu Naidu	
2		Muttamsetti Srinivasa Rao (born 1967); MLA for Bheemili	30 May 2019	7 April 2022	2 years, 312 days	2019 (15th)	YSR Congress Party	Jagan	Y. S. Jagan Mohan Reddy	
3		R.K.Roja (born 1972); MLA for Nagari	11 April 2022	11 June 2024	2 years, 61 days	2019 (15th)	YSR Congress Party	Jagan	Y. S. Jagan Mohan Reddy	
4		Kandula Durgesh (born 1960); MLA for Nidadavole	12 June 2024	Incumbent	2 years, 87 days	2024 (16th)	Janasena Party	Naidu IV	N. Chandrababu Naidu	
