= Andhra Pradesh Council of Ministers =

Part of the government of Andhra Pradesh

- Seat of Government: Amaravati

Legislative branch
- Assembly: Andhra Pradesh State Assembly
- Speaker: Chintakayala Ayyanna Patrudu
- Deputy Speaker: Raghu Rama Krishna Raju
- Members in Assembly: 175
- Council: Andhra Pradesh Legislative Council
- Chair: Koyye Moshenu Raju
- Members in Council: 58

Executive branch
- Governor: Syed Abdul Nazeer
- Chief Minister: Nara Chandrababu Naidu
- Deputy Chief Minister: Pawan Kalyan
- Chief Secretary: Guttapalli Sai Prasad

The Andhra Pradesh Council of Ministers are elected legislative members, who are appointed as ministers by the Governor of Andhra Pradesh to form the executive branch of the Government of Andhra Pradesh. They hold various portfolios as decided by the Chief minister of Andhra Pradesh. The most recent state council of ministers is headed by N. Chandrababu Naidu after the 2024 Andhra Pradesh Legislative Assembly election. The term of every executive wing is five years.

The council of ministers are assisted by department secretaries attached to each ministry who are from IAS cadre. The chief executive officer responsible for issuing orders on behalf of Government is Chief Secretary to the State Government.

== Constitutional requirement ==
=== For the Council of Ministers to aid and advise Governor ===
According to Article 163 of the Indian Constitution,

# There shall be a Council of Ministers with the Chief Minister at the head to aid and advise the Governor in the exercise of his function, except in so far as he is by or under this Constitution required to exercise his functions or any of them in his discretion.

1. If any question arises whether any matter is or is not a matter as respects which the Governor is by or under this Constitution required to act in his discretion, the decision of the Governor in his discretion shall be final, and the validity of anything done by the Governor shall not be called in question on the ground that he ought or ought not to have acted in his discretion.
2. The question whether any, and if so what, advice was tendered by Ministers to the Governor shall not be inquired into in any court.

This means that the Ministers serve under the pleasure of the Governor and he/she may remove them, on the advice of the Chief Minister, whenever they want.

The Chief Minister shall be appointed by the Governor and the other Ministers shall be appointed by the Governor on the advice of the Chief Minister, and the Minister shall hold office during the pleasure of the Governor:

Provided that in the States of Bihar, Madhya Pradesh and Orissa, there shall be a Minister in charge of tribal welfare who may in addition be in charge of the welfare of the Scheduled Castes and backward classes or any other work.

# The Council of Minister shall be collectively responsible to the Legislative Assembly of the State.

1. Before a Minister enters upon his office, the Governor shall administer to him the oaths of office and of secrecy according to the forms set out for the purpose in the Third Schedule.
2. A Minister who for any period of six consecutive months is not a member of the Legislature of the State shall at the expiration of that period cease to be a Minister.
3. The salaries and allowances of Ministers shall be such as the Legislature of the State may from time to time by law determine and, until the Legislature of the State so determines, shall be a specified in the Second Schedule.

== Chief Minister ==
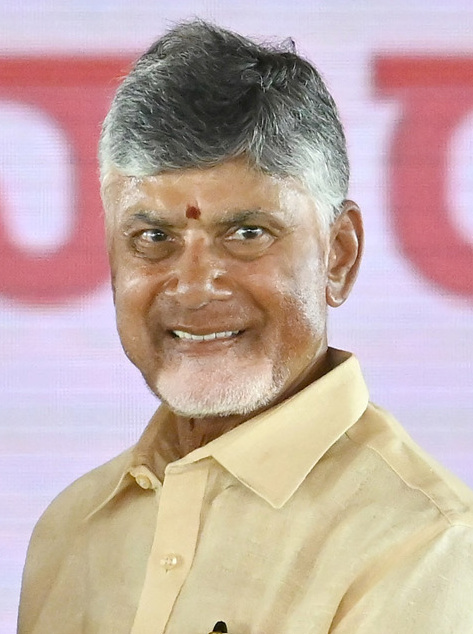
N. Chandrababu Naidu (Chief Minister of Andhra Pradesh)

Like any Indian state, Chief Minister of Andhra Pradesh is the real head of the government and responsible for state administration. He is the leader of the parliamentary party in the legislature and heads the state cabinet.

== Deputy Chief Minister ==
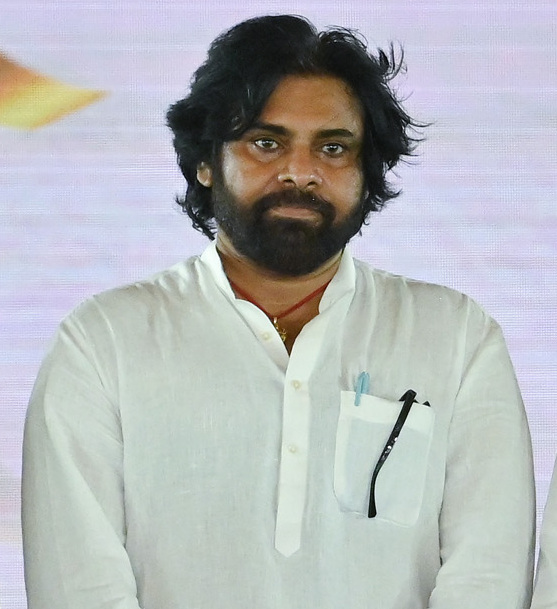
Pawan Kalyan (Deputy Chief Minister of Andhra Pradesh)

== State Council of Ministers ==
As per Indian Constitution, all portfolios of state government is vested in Chief Minister, who distribute various portfolio to individual ministers whom he nominates to the State Governor. The state governor appoints individual ministers for various portfolios and departments as per advice of Chief Minister and together form the State Cabinet. As the original portfolios are vested with CM, who delegates to others upon his/her wish, actions of individual ministers are part of collective responsibility of the state cabinet and Chief Minister is responsible for actions of each minister. The state cabinet along with Chief Minister, prepares General policy and individual department policy, which will be guiding policy for day-to-day administration of each minister.

=== Council of Ministers ===
#	Portrait	Minister	Portfolio	Constituency	Tenure		Party
#	Portrait	Minister	Portfolio	Constituency	Took office	Left office	Party
Chief Minister
1		Nara Chandrababu Naidu	General Administration; Law & Order; Public Enterprises; All other portfolios not allocated to any Minister	Kuppam	12 June 2024	Incumbent	TDP
Deputy Chief Minister
2		Konidela Pawan Kalyan	Panchayat Raj; Rural Development & Rural Water Supply; Environment; Forest; Science and Technology	Pithapuram	12 June 2024	Incumbent	JSP
Cabinet Ministers							
3		Nara Lokesh	Human Resources Development; Information Technology; Electronics & Communication; Real Time Governance	Mangalagiri	12 June 2024	Incumbent	TDP
4		Kinjarapu Atchannaidu	Agriculture; Co-operation; Marketing; Animal Husbandry; Dairy Development & Fisheries	Tekkali	12 June 2024	Incumbent	TDP
5		Kollu Ravindra	Mines & Geology; Excise	Machilipatnam	12 June 2024	Incumbent	TDP
6		Nadendla Manohar	Food & Civil Supplies; Consumer Affairs	Tenali	12 June 2024	Incumbent	JSP
7		Ponguru Narayana	Municipal Administration & Urban Development	Nellore City	12 June 2024	Incumbent	TDP
8		Vangalapudi Anitha	Home Affairs & Disaster Management	Payakaraopet	12 June 2024	Incumbent	TDP
9		Satya Kumar Yadav	Health; Family Welfare & Medical Education	Dharmavaram	12 June 2024	Incumbent	BJP
10		Nimmala Rama Naidu	Water Resources Development	Palakollu	12 June 2024	Incumbent	TDP
11		Nasyam Mohammed Farooq	Law & Justice; Minority Welfare	Nandyal	12 June 2024	Incumbent	TDP
12		Anam Ramanarayana Reddy	Endowments	Atmakur	12 June 2024	Incumbent	TDP
13		Payyavula Keshav	Finance; Planning; Commercial Taxes; Legislative Affairs	Uravakonda	12 June 2024	Incumbent	TDP
14		Anagani Satya Prasad	Revenue; Registration & Stamps	Repalle	12 June 2024	Incumbent	TDP
`15		Kolusu Parthasarathy	Housing; Information & Public Relations	Nuzvid	12 June 2024	Incumbent	TDP
16		Dola Sree Bala Veeranjaneya Swamy	Social Welfare; Disabled & Senior Citizen Welfare; Sachivalayam & Village Volunteer	Kondapi	12 June 2024	Incumbent	TDP
17		Gottipati Ravi Kumar	Energy	Addanki	12 June 2024	Incumbent	TDP
18		Kandula Durgesh	Tourism; Culture; Cinematography	Nidadavole	12 June 2024	Incumbent	JSP
19		Gummadi Sandhya Rani	Women & Child Welfare; Tribal Welfare	Salur	12 June 2024	Incumbent	TDP
20		B. C. Janardhan Reddy	Roads & Buildings; Infrastructure & Investments	Banaganapalle	12 June 2024	Incumbent	TDP
21		T. G. Bharath	Industries & Commerce; Food Processing	Kurnool	12 June 2024	Incumbent	TDP
22		S. Savitha	Backward Classes Welfare; Economically Weaker Sections Welfare; Handlooms & Textiles	Penukonda	12 June 2024	Incumbent	TDP
23		Vasamsetti Subhash	Labour; Factories; Boilers & Insurance Medical Services	Ramachandrapuram	12 June 2024	Incumbent	TDP
24		Kondapalli Srinivas	Micro, Small and Medium Enterprises; Society for Elimination of Rural Poverty; NRI Empowerment & Relations	Gajapathinagaram	12 June 2024	Incumbent	TDP
25		Mandipalli Ramprasad Reddy	Transport; Youth & Sports	Rayachoti	12 June 2024	Incumbent	TDP

== List of Cabinets ==
Assembly	Chief Minister	Ministry	Party	Election
1st	Tanguturi Prakasam Panthulu	First Tanguturi Prakasam Panthulu ministry	INC	1955 Andhra State Legislative Assembly election
1st	Bezawada Gopala Reddy	First Bezawada Gopala Reddy ministry	INC	1955 Andhra State Legislative Assembly election
2nd	Neelam Sanjiva Reddy	First Neelam Sanjiva Reddy ministry	INC	1957 Andhra Pradesh Legislative Assembly election
2nd	Damodaram Sanjivayya	Damodaram Sanjivayya ministry	INC	1957 Andhra Pradesh Legislative Assembly election
3rd	Neelam Sanjiva Reddy	Second Neelam Sanjiva Reddy ministry	INC	1962 Andhra Pradesh Legislative Assembly election
3rd	Kasu Brahmananda Reddy	First Kasu Brahmananda Reddy ministry	INC	1962 Andhra Pradesh Legislative Assembly election
4th	Kasu Brahmananda Reddy	Second Kasu Brahmananda Reddy ministry	INC	1967 Andhra Pradesh Legislative Assembly election
4th	P. V. Narasimha Rao	First P. V. Narasimha Rao ministry	INC	1967 Andhra Pradesh Legislative Assembly election
5th	P. V. Narasimha Rao	Second P. V. Narasimha Rao ministry	INC	1972 Andhra Pradesh Legislative Assembly election
5th	Jalagam Vengala Rao	Jalagam Vengala Rao ministry	INC	1972 Andhra Pradesh Legislative Assembly election
6th	Marri Chenna Reddy	First Marri Chenna Reddy ministry	INC	1978 Andhra Pradesh Legislative Assembly election
6th	T. Anjaiah	T. Anjaiah ministry	INC	1978 Andhra Pradesh Legislative Assembly election
6th	Bhavanam Venkatarami Reddy	Bhavanam Venkatarami Reddy ministry	INC	1978 Andhra Pradesh Legislative Assembly election
6th	Kotla Vijaya Bhaskara Reddy	First Kotla Vijaya Bhaskara Reddy ministry	INC	1978 Andhra Pradesh Legislative Assembly election
7th	N. T. Rama Rao	First N. T. Rama Rao ministry	TDP	1983 Andhra Pradesh Legislative Assembly election
7th	N. Bhaskara Rao	N. Bhaskara Rao ministry	TDP	1983 Andhra Pradesh Legislative Assembly election
7th	N. T. Rama Rao	Second N. T. Rama Rao ministry	TDP	1983 Andhra Pradesh Legislative Assembly election
8th	N. T. Rama Rao	Third N. T. Rama Rao ministry	TDP	1985 Andhra Pradesh Legislative Assembly election
9th	Marri Chenna Reddy	Second Marri Chenna Reddy ministry	INC	1989 Andhra Pradesh Legislative Assembly election
9th	N. Janardhana Reddy	N. Janardhana Reddy ministry	INC	1989 Andhra Pradesh Legislative Assembly election
9th	Kotla Vijaya Bhaskara Reddy	Second Kotla Vijaya Bhaskara Reddy ministry	INC	1989 Andhra Pradesh Legislative Assembly election
10th	N. T. Rama Rao	Fourth N. T. Rama Rao ministry	TDP	1994 Andhra Pradesh Legislative Assembly election
10th	N. Chandrababu Naidu	First N. Chandrababu Naidu ministry	TDP	1994 Andhra Pradesh Legislative Assembly election
11th	N. Chandrababu Naidu	Second N. Chandrababu Naidu ministry	TDP	1999 Andhra Pradesh Legislative Assembly election
12th	Y. S. Rajasekhara Reddy	First Y. S. Rajasekhara Reddy ministry	INC	2004 Andhra Pradesh Legislative Assembly election
13th	Y. S. Rajasekhara Reddy	Second Y. S. Rajasekhara Reddy ministry	INC	2009 Andhra Pradesh Legislative Assembly election
13th	Konijeti Rosaiah	Konijeti Rosaiah ministry	INC	2009 Andhra Pradesh Legislative Assembly election
13th	Kiran Kumar Reddy	Kiran Kumar Reddy ministry	INC	2009 Andhra Pradesh Legislative Assembly election
14th	N. Chandrababu Naidu	Third N. Chandrababu Naidu ministry	TDP	2014 Andhra Pradesh Legislative Assembly election
15th	Y. S. Jagan Mohan Reddy	Y. S. Jagan Mohan Reddy ministry	YSRCP	2019 Andhra Pradesh Legislative Assembly election
16th	N. Chandrababu Naidu	Fourth N. Chandrababu Naidu ministry	TDP	2024 Andhra Pradesh Legislative Assembly election

== Oath as the state chief minister/minister ==
I, <Name of Chief Minister/Minister>, do swear in the name of God/solemnly affirm that I will bear true faith and allegiance to the Constitution of India as by law established, that I will uphold the sovereignty and integrity of India, that I will faithfully and conscientiously discharge my duties as a Minister for the State of () and that I will do right to all manner of people in accordance with the Constitution and the law without fear or favour, affection or ill-will.
