= Government of Andhra Pradesh =

Indian state government

- Emblem of Andhra Pradesh
- Polity type: Parliamentary republic State government
- Constitution: Constitution of India

Legislative branch
- Name: Andhra Pradesh Legislature
- Type: Bicameral
- Meeting place: Amaravati
- Upper house
- Name: Andhra Pradesh Legislative Council
- Presiding officer: Koyye Moshenu Raju, Chairman
- Lower house
- Name: Andhra Pradesh Legislative Assembly
- Presiding officer: Chintakayala Ayyanna Patrudu, Speaker

Executive branch
- Head of state
- Currently: S. Abdul Nazeer
- Appointer: President of India (on advice of Union Council of Ministers)
- Head of government
- Currently: N. Chandrababu Naidu
- Appointer: Governor
- Cabinet
- Name: Deputy Chief Minister
- Leader: Pawan Kalyan
- Headquarters: Amaravati
- Ministries: See Council of Ministers

Judicial branch
- Name: Andhra Pradesh High Court
- Courts: Judiciary of India
- Andhra Pradesh High Court
- Chief judge: Lisa Gill
- Seat: Amaravati

The Government of Andhra Pradesh, abbreviated as GoAP, is the state government and the administrative body responsible for the governance of the Indian state of Andhra Pradesh. Amaravati is the capital of the state and houses the state executive, legislature and head of judiciary.

Under the Constitution of India, de jure executive authority lies with the governor, although this authority is exercised only by, or on the advice of, the chief minister, the de facto authority and the cabinet. Following elections to the Andhra Pradesh Legislative Assembly, the state's governor usually invites the party (or coalition) with a majority of seats to form the government. The governor appoints the chief minister, whose council of ministers are collectively responsible to the assembly.

It is an elected government with 175 MLAs elected to the Legislative Assembly of Andhra Pradesh for a five-year term. The Government of Andhra Pradesh is a democratically elected body that governs the state of Andhra Pradesh, India.

== Governance ==
=== Executive ===
The Government of Andhra Pradesh is a democratically elected body with the governor as the constitutional head. The governor who is appointed for a period of five years appoints the chief minister and his council of ministers. Even though the governor remains the ceremonial head of the state, the day-to-day running of the government is taken care of by the chief minister and his council of ministers in whom a great deal of legislative powers is vested.

==== Council of Ministers ====
| # | Portrait | Minister | Portfolio | Constituency | Tenure | | Party |
| # | Portrait | Minister | Portfolio | Constituency | Took office | Left office | Party |
Chief Minister
| 1 | | Nara Chandrababu Naidu | General Administration; Law & Order; Public Enterprises; Other departments not allocated to any Minister | Kuppam | 12 June 2024 | Incumbent | TDP |
Deputy Chief Minister
| 2 | | Konidala Pawan Kalyan | Panchayat Raj; Rural Development & Rural Water Supply; Environment; Forest; Science and Technology | Pithapuram | 12 June 2024 | Incumbent | JSP |
| Cabinet Ministers | | | | | | | |
| 3 | | Nara Lokesh | Human Resources Development; Information Technology; Electronics & Communication; Real Time Governance | Mangalagiri | 12 June 2024 | Incumbent | TDP |
| 4 | | Kinjarapu Atchannaidu | Agriculture; Co-operation; Marketing; Animal Husbandry; Dairy Development & Fisheries | Tekkali | 12 June 2024 | Incumbent | TDP |
| 5 | | Kollu Ravindra | Mines & Geology; Excise | Machilipatnam | 12 June 2024 | Incumbent | TDP |
| 6 | | Nadendla Manohar | Food & Civil Supplies; Consumer Affairs | Tenali | 12 June 2024 | Incumbent | JSP |
| 7 | | Ponguru Narayana | Municipal Administration & Urban Development | Nellore City | 12 June 2024 | Incumbent | TDP |
| 8 | | Vangalapudi Anitha | Home Affairs & Disaster Management | Payakaraopet | 12 June 2024 | Incumbent | TDP |
| 9 | | Satya Kumar Yadav | Health; Family Welfare & Medical Education | Dharmavaram | 12 June 2024 | Incumbent | BJP |
| 10 | | Nimmala Rama Naidu | Water Resources Development | Palakollu | 12 June 2024 | Incumbent | TDP |
| 11 | | Nasyam Mohammed Farooq | Law & Justice; Minority Welfare | Nandyal | 12 June 2024 | Incumbent | TDP |
| 12 | | Anam Ramanarayana Reddy | Endowments | Atmakur | 12 June 2024 | Incumbent | TDP |
| 13 | | Payyavula Keshav | Finance; Planning; Commercial Taxes; Legislative Affairs | Uravakonda | 12 June 2024 | Incumbent | TDP |
| 14 | | Anagani Satya Prasad | Revenue; Registration & Stamps | Repalle | 12 June 2024 | Incumbent | TDP |
| `15 | | Kolusu Parthasarathy | Housing; Information & Public Relations | Nuzvid | 12 June 2024 | Incumbent | TDP |
| 16 | | Dola Sree Bala Veeranjaneya Swamy | Social Welfare; Disabled & Senior Citizen Welfare; Sachivalayam & Village Volunteer | Kondapi | 12 June 2024 | Incumbent | TDP |
| 17 | | Gottipati Ravi Kumar | Energy | Addanki | 12 June 2024 | Incumbent | TDP |
| 18 | | Kandula Durgesh | Tourism; Culture; Cinematography | Nidadavole | 12 June 2024 | Incumbent | JSP |
| 19 | | Gummadi Sandhya Rani | Women & Child Welfare; Tribal Welfare | Salur | 12 June 2024 | Incumbent | TDP |
| 20 | | B. C. Janardhan Reddy | Roads & Buildings; Infrastructure & Investments | Banaganapalle | 12 June 2024 | Incumbent | TDP |
| 21 | | T. G. Bharath | Industries & Commerce; Food Processing | Kurnool | 12 June 2024 | Incumbent | TDP |
| 22 | | S. Savitha | Backward Classes Welfare; Economically Weaker Sections Welfare; Handlooms & Textiles | Penukonda | 12 June 2024 | Incumbent | TDP |
| 23 | | Vasamsetti Subhash | Labour; Factories; Boilers & Insurance Medical Services | Ramachandrapuram | 12 June 2024 | Incumbent | TDP |
| 24 | | Kondapalli Srinivas | Micro, Small and Medium Enterprises; Society for Elimination of Rural Poverty; NRI Empowerment & Relations | Gajapathinagaram | 12 June 2024 | Incumbent | TDP |
| 25 | | Mandipalli Ramprasad Reddy | Transport; Youth & Sports | Rayachoti | 12 June 2024 | Incumbent | TDP |

=== Legislature ===
The Andhra Pradesh Legislature is currently bicameral consisting of:

- Andhra Pradesh Legislative Assembly: 175 members (MLAs)
- Andhra Pradesh Legislative Council: 58 members (MLCs)

=== Judiciary ===
High Court of Judicature at Hyderabad was the highest court of appeal at the state level till 2019. After Andhra Pradesh High Court was inaugurated in Amaravati on 1 January 2019, it became the High Court for the State of Andhra Pradesh. It has subordinate Civil and Criminal Courts in every District. Decisions of the High Court of Andhra Pradesh can be appealed in the Supreme Court of India.

== Departments ==
The Government of Andhra Pradesh operates through a structured administrative framework comprising various Secretariat departments. Each department is overseen by a Secretary to the Government, who serves as the administrative head, while overall coordination and supervision lie with the Chief Secretary. These departments are further divided into sub-divisions, directorates, and affiliated bodies such as boards and corporations to effectively implement government policies and deliver public services. As per the official allocation of business, the state currently has 37 departments.

- Agriculture & Co-operation
- Animal Husbandry, Dairy Development & Fisheries
- Backward Classes Welfare
- Chief Minister's Office
- Consumer Affairs, Food and Civil Supplies
- Economically Weaker Sections Welfare
- Energy
- Environment and Forests
- Finance
- General Administration
- Health, Medical & Family Welfare
- Home
- Housing
- Human Resources Development (Higher Education)
- Human Resources Development (School Education)
- Industries and Commerce
- Information Technology, Electronics and Communications
- Infrastructure and Investment
- Labour, Factories, Boilers and Insurance Medical Services
- Law
- Legislature
- Municipal Administration and Urban Development
- Minorities Welfare
- Panchayat Raj and Rural Development
- Planning
- Public Enterprises
- Real Time Governance
- Revenue
- Science, Technology and Innovation
- Skill Development and Training
- Social Welfare
- Swarna Gramam and Swarna Wardu
- Transport, Roads and Buildings
- Water Resources
- Tribal Welfare
- Women, Children, Differently Abled and Senior Citizens Welfare
- Youth Advancement, Tourism and Culture

== District in-charge ministers ==
| S.No | District | In-charge Minister | Party | Tenure | |
|---|---|---|---|---|---|
| 1 | Srikakulam | Kondapalli Srinivas | Telugu Desam Party | 15 October 2024 | Incumbent |
| 2 | Parvathipuram Manyam | Kinjarapu Atchannaidu | Telugu Desam Party | 15 October 2024 | Incumbent |
| 3 | Vizianagaram | Vangalapudi Anitha | Telugu Desam Party | 15 October 2024 | Incumbent |
| 4 | Visakhapatnam | Dr. Dola Sree Bala Veeranjaneya Swamy | Telugu Desam Party | 15 October 2024 | Incumbent |
| 5 | Alluri Sitharama Raju | Gummadi Sandhya Rani | Telugu Desam Party | 15 October 2024 | Incumbent |
| 6 | Anakapalli | Kollu Ravindra | Telugu Desam Party | 15 October 2024 | Incumbent |
| 7 | Kakinada | Ponguru Narayana | Telugu Desam Party | 15 October 2024 | Incumbent |
| 8 | East Godavari | Dr. Nimmala Rama Naidu | Telugu Desam Party | 15 October 2024 | Incumbent |
| 9 | Dr. B. R. Ambedkar Konaseema | Kinjarapu Atchannaidu | Telugu Desam Party | 15 October 2024 | Incumbent |
| 10 | Eluru | Nadendla Manohar | Janasena Party | 15 October 2024 | Incumbent |
| 11 | West Godavari | Gottipati Ravi Kumar | Telugu Desam Party | 15 October 2024 | Incumbent |
| 12 | NTR | Satya Kumar Yadav | Bharatiya Janata Party | 15 October 2024 | Incumbent |
| 13 | Krishna | Vasamsetti Subhash | Telugu Desam Party | 15 October 2024 | Incumbent |
| 14 | Palnadu | Gottipati Ravi Kumar | Telugu Desam Party | 15 October 2024 | Incumbent |
| 15 | Guntur | Kandula Durgesh | Janasena Party | 15 October 2024 | Incumbent |
| 16 | Bapatla | Kolusu Parthasarathy | Telugu Desam Party | 15 October 2024 | Incumbent |
| 17 | Prakasam | Anam Ramanarayana Reddy | Telugu Desam Party | 15 October 2024 | Incumbent |
| 18 | Markapuram | Anam Ramanarayana Reddy | Telugu Desam Party | 01 January 2026 | Incumbent |
| 19 | Sri Potti Sriramulu Nellore | N. Md. Farooq | Telugu Desam Party | 15 October 2024 | Incumbent |
| 20 | Kurnool | Dr. Nimmala Rama Naidu | Telugu Desam Party | 15 October 2024 | Incumbent |
| 21 | Nandyal | Payyavula Keshav | Telugu Desam Party | 15 October 2024 | Incumbent |
| 22 | Ananthapuramu | T. G. Bharath | Telugu Desam Party | 15 October 2024 | Incumbent |
| 23 | Sri Sathya Sai | Anagani Satya Prasad | Telugu Desam Party | 15 October 2024 | Incumbent |
| 24 | YSR Kadapa | S. Savitha | Telugu Desam Party | 15 October 2024 | Incumbent |
| 25 | Annamayya | B. C. Janardhan Reddy | Telugu Desam Party | 15 October 2024 | Incumbent |
| 26 | Tirupati | Anagani Satya Prasad | Telugu Desam Party | 15 October 2024 | Incumbent |
| 27 | Chittoor | Mandipalli Ramprasad Reddy | Telugu Desam Party | 15 October 2024 | |

== Emblem ==
The emblem consists of “Dharma Chakra" (Wheel of law), decorated with a string of triratnas alternating with pinnate leaves and precious stones. Three circles of decorative beads surround the wheel. “Purna Ghataka” (The vase of plenty) is at the hub of the wheel. The national emblem is at the bottom. The word ‘Andhra Pradesh Prabhutvam’ (Government of Andhra Pradesh) in Telugu script is at the top. It is flanked by the word "Andhra Pradesh" written in English and Devanagari. The word 'Satyameva Jayathe' in Telugu scripts appears at the bottom.

== See also ==
- List of chief ministers of Andhra Pradesh
- Politics of Andhra Pradesh
