= Fourth N. Chandrababu Naidu ministry =

Government of Andhra Pradesh since 2024

- 28th Ministry of Andhra Pradesh

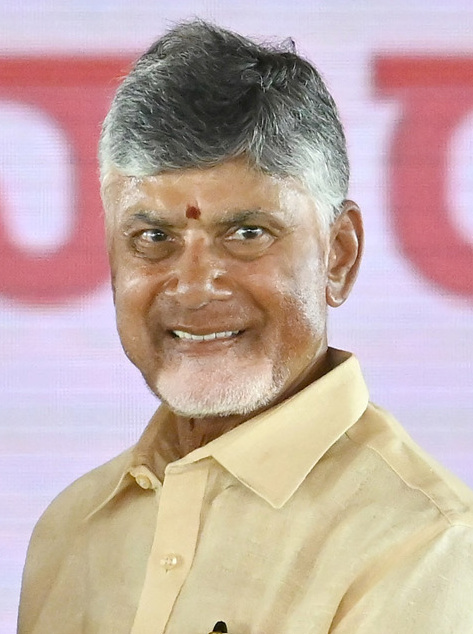
- N. Chandrababu Naidu
- Date formed: 12 June 2024

People and organisations
- Governor: Syed Abdul Nazeer
- Chief Minister: N. Chandrababu Naidu
- Deputy Chief Minister: Pawan Kalyan
- No. of ministers: 25
- Total no. of members: 25
- Member parties: Kutami: Telugu Desam Party (21); Janasena Party (3); Bharatiya Janata Party (1)
- Status in legislature: Majority
- Opposition party: None
- Opposition leader: Botsa Satyanarayana (Council); Vacant (Assembly)

History
- Election: 2024
- Legislature term: 5 years
- Predecessor: Y. S. Jagan Mohan Reddy ministry

The Fourth N. Chandrababu Naidu ministry (or also known as 28th ministry of Andhra Pradesh) was formed on 12 June 2024 and is headed by N. Chandrababu Naidu as the chief minister following the 2024 Andhra Pradesh Legislative Assembly election.

== Background ==
The state cabinet of Andhra Pradesh with N. Chandrababu Naidu as the Chief Minister was sworn in on 12 June 2024. The swearing-in ceremony took place at 11:27 AM on 12 June 2024 near Gannavaram Airport, Kesarapalle, Amaravati (Vijayawada).

The list of 24 cabinet ministers (excluding the chief minister) was announced on 12 June 2024 prior to the oath-taking ceremony. The cabinet has twenty one ministers from Telugu Desam Party, three from Janasena Party and one from Bharatiya Janata Party. 17 of the 25 are first-time ministers.

The portfolios of all the cabinet ministers were announced on 14 June 2024.

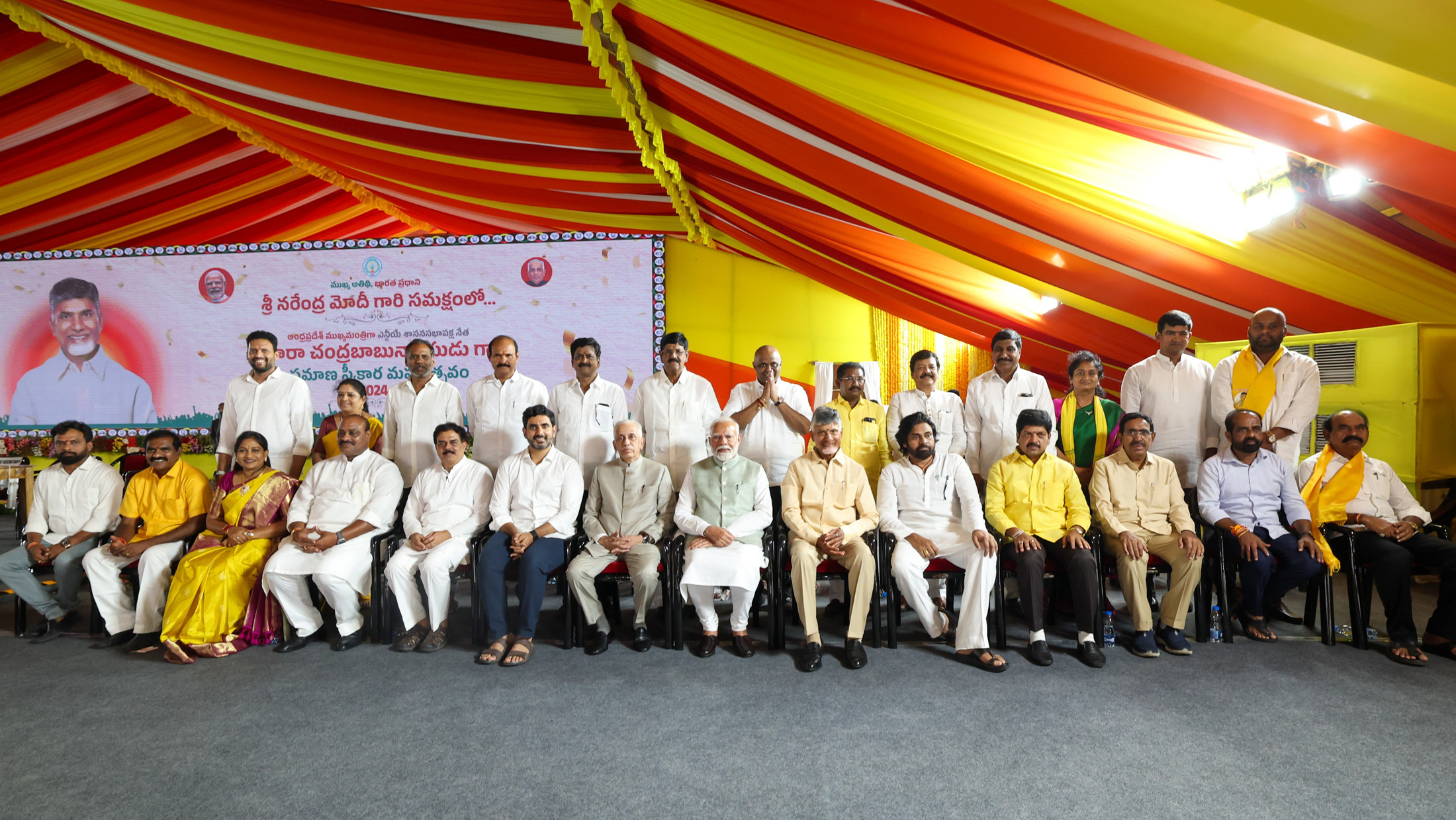
Narendra Modi (Prime Minister of India), Syed Abdul Nazeer (Governor of Andhra Pradesh) and N. Chandrababu Naidu (Chief Minister of Andhra Pradesh) along with the council of ministers at the swearing-in ceremony.

== Council of Ministers ==
#	Portrait	Minister	Portfolio	Constituency	Tenure		Party
#	Portrait	Minister	Portfolio	Constituency	Took office	Left office	Party
Chief Minister
1		Nara Chandrababu Naidu	General Administration; Law & Order; Public Enterprises; Other departments not allocated to any Minister	Kuppam	12 June 2024	Incumbent	TDP
Deputy Chief Minister
2		Konidela Pawan Kalyan	Panchayat Raj; Rural Development & Rural Water Supply; Environment; Forest; Science and Technology	Pithapuram	12 June 2024	Incumbent	JSP
Cabinet Ministers							
3		Satya Kumar Yadav	Health; Family Welfare & Medical Education	Dharmavaram	12 June 2024	Incumbent	BJP
4		Kinjarapu Atchannaidu	Agriculture; Co-operation; Marketing; Animal Husbandry; Dairy Development & Fisheries	Tekkali	12 June 2024	Incumbent	TDP
5		Kollu Ravindra	Mines & Geology; Excise	Machilipatnam	12 June 2024	Incumbent	TDP
6		Nadendla Manohar	Food & Civil Supplies; Consumer Affairs	Tenali	12 June 2024	Incumbent	JSP
7		Ponguru Narayana	Municipal Administration & Urban Development	Nellore City	12 June 2024	Incumbent	TDP
8		Vangalapudi Anitha	Home Affairs & Disaster Management	Payakaraopet	12 June 2024	Incumbent	TDP
9		Nara Lokesh	Human Resources Development; Information Technology; Electronics & Communication; Real Time Governance	Mangalagiri	12 June 2024	Incumbent	TDP
10		Nimmala Rama Naidu	Water Resources Development	Palakollu	12 June 2024	Incumbent	TDP
11		Nasyam Mohammed Farooq	Law & Justice; Minority Welfare	Nandyal	12 June 2024	Incumbent	TDP
12		Anam Ramanarayana Reddy	Endowments	Atmakur	12 June 2024	Incumbent	TDP
13		Payyavula Keshav	Finance; Planning; Commercial Taxes; Legislative Affairs	Uravakonda	12 June 2024	Incumbent	TDP
14		Anagani Satya Prasad	Revenue; Registration & Stamps	Repalle	12 June 2024	Incumbent	TDP
`15		Kolusu Parthasarathy	Housing; Information & Public Relations	Nuzvid	12 June 2024	Incumbent	TDP
16		Dola Sree Bala Veeranjaneya Swamy	Social Welfare; Disabled & Senior Citizen Welfare; Sachivalayam & Village Volunteer	Kondapi	12 June 2024	Incumbent	TDP
17		Gottipati Ravi Kumar	Energy	Addanki	12 June 2024	Incumbent	TDP
18		Kandula Durgesh	Tourism; Culture; Cinematography	Nidadavole	12 June 2024	Incumbent	JSP
19		Gummadi Sandhya Rani	Women & Child Welfare; Tribal Welfare	Salur	12 June 2024	Incumbent	TDP
20		B. C. Janardhan Reddy	Roads & Buildings; Infrastructure & Investments	Banaganapalle	12 June 2024	Incumbent	TDP
21		T. G. Bharath	Industries & Commerce; Food Processing	Kurnool	12 June 2024	Incumbent	TDP
22		S. Savitha	Backward Classes Welfare; Economically Weaker Sections Welfare; Handlooms & Textiles	Penukonda	12 June 2024	Incumbent	TDP
23		Vasamsetti Subhash	Labour; Factories; Boilers & Insurance Medical Services	Ramachandrapuram	12 June 2024	Incumbent	TDP
24		Kondapalli Srinivas	Micro, Small and Medium Enterprises; Society for Elimination of Rural Poverty; NRI Empowerment & Relations	Gajapathinagaram	12 June 2024	Incumbent	TDP
25		Mandipalli Ramprasad Reddy	Transport; Youth & Sports	Rayachoti	12 June 2024	Incumbent	TDP

== Demographics ==
=== Parties ===
Party	Total number of ministers
Telugu Desam Party	21
Janasena Party	3
Bharatiya Janata Party	1

Representation of cabinet ministers by party
1. Telugu Desam Party (84.0%)
2. Janasena Party (12.0%)
3. Bharatiya Janata Party (4.00%)

=== Districts ===
District	Total number of ministers	Name of ministers	Guardian minister
Alluri Sitharama Raju	–	–	Gummadi Sandhya Rani
Anakapalli	1	Vangalapudi Anitha	Kollu Ravindra
Ananthapuramu	1	Payyavula Keshav	T. G. Bharath
Annamayya	1	Mandipalli Ramprasad Reddy	B. C. Janardhan Reddy
Bapatla	2	Anagani Satya Prasad; Gottipati Ravi Kumar	Kolusu Parthasarathy
Chittoor	1	N. Chandrababu Naidu (Chief Minister)	Mandipalli Ramprasad Reddy
Konaseema	1	Vasamsetti Subhash	Kinjarapu Atchannaidu
East Godavari	1	Kandula Durgesh	Nimmala Ramanaidu
Eluru	1	Kolusu Parthasarathy	Nadendla Manohar
Guntur	2	Nara Lokesh; Nadendla Manohar	Kandula Durgesh
Kakinada	1	Pawan Kalyan (Deputy Chief Minister)	Ponguru Narayana
Krishna	1	Kollu Ravindra	Vasamsetti Subhash
Kurnool	1	T. G. Bharath	Nimmala Ramanaidu
Nandyal	2	N. Md. Farooq; B. C. Janardhan Reddy	Payyavula Keshav
Nellore	2	Ponguru Narayana; Anam Ramanarayana Reddy	N. Md. Farooq
NTR	–	–	Satya Kumar Yadav
Palnadu	–	–	Gottipati Ravi Kumar
Parvathipuram Manyam	1	Gummadi Sandhya Rani	Kinjarapu Atchannaidu
Prakasam	1	Dola Sree Bala Veeranjaneya Swamy	Anam Ramanarayana Reddy
Sri Sathya Sai	2	Satya Kumar Yadav; S. Savitha	Anagani Satya Prasad
Srikakulam	1	Kinjarapu Atchannaidu	Kondapalli Srinivas
Tirupati	–	–	Anagani Satya Prasad
Visakhapatnam	–	–	Dola Sree Bala Veeranjaneya Swamy
Vizianagaram	1	Kondapalli Srinivas	Vangalapudi Anitha
West Godavari	1	Nimmala Ramanaidu	Gottipati Ravi Kumar
Kadapa	–	–	S. Savitha

== Major decisions ==
With the formation of the government (popularly referred to as Kūṭami) on 12 June 2024, the cabinet ministers were allocated their portfolios on 14 June 2024.

In July, Chief Minister Naidu released white papers in the assembly highlighting the status of the state's finances, energy sector, law and order, and excise department. He addressed the current state of the debt and alleged financial mismanagement by the previous government.

On 1 July 2024, Chief Minister Naidu wrote to Telangana Chief Minister Revanth Reddy, proposing a meeting to address unresolved issues under the Andhra Pradesh Reorganisation Act, 2014. The meeting at Praja Bhavan involved officials and ministers from both states, with Telangana Deputy Chief Minister Mallu Bhatti Vikramarka outlining a three-phase approach to resolve bifurcation-related matters.

The government marked the completion of 100 days since its formation with a program called "Idi Manchi Prabhutvam," held from 20 September to 26 September. The Chief Minister and ministers attended events at the village and ward levels, highlighting the government's achievements during this period.

=== Timeline ===
13 June 2024 – On assuming office on 13 June 2024 at the Secretariat in Amaravati, Chief Minister Naidu signed five key files, which included decisions on the Mega District Selection Committee notification for the recruitment of 16,347 teachers, the withdrawal of the AP Land Titling Act, the increase of social security pensions, conducting a skill census, and reviving the Anna Canteen. The government also restored the name of N. T. Rama Rao to the social security pension scheme, renaming it the "NTR Bharosa Pension Scheme." Under this scheme, the pension for senior citizens and widows was increased from Rs. 3,000 to Rs. 4,000, for people with disabilities from Rs. 3,000 to Rs. 6,000, and for those with chronic diseases from Rs. 5,000 to Rs. 10,000. Additionally, handloom workers, toddy tappers, fishermen, transgender individuals, and various artists will receive a pension of Rs. 4,000 per month, while for those with complete disabilities from Rs. 5,000 to Rs. 15,000.

23 July 2024 – The Government of India announced a facilitation of Rs. 15,000 crore to support the construction of the state capital Amaravati through multilateral development agencies in the current financial year, with additional amounts to be provided in future years. The Central government also expressed its commitment to financing and ensuring the early completion of the Polavaram Project. Funds and grants for the backward districts, as well as for the Koparthy and Orvakal industrial nodes, were also announced.

24 July 2024 – The Andhra Pradesh government restored the name of Dr. YSR University of Health Sciences to its original name, Dr. NTR University of Health Sciences, located in Vijayawada. Established by NTR in 1986, he also served as its first Chancellor. The university was originally named after NTR in 1998 by N. Chandrababu Naidu, but the previous YSRCP government had renamed it after YSR in 2022.

15 August 2024 – The government has re-launched the Anna Canteen program, an initiative to provide subsidised meals at ₹5, originally introduced in 2018 but discontinued by the previous YSR Congress Party government. On the occasion of Independence Day, Chief Minister Naidu inaugurated a canteen in Gudivada, marking the opening of 100 canteens in the first phase.

23 August 2024 – The Deputy Chief Minister of Andhra Pradesh, Pawan Kalyan, directed officials to hold village meetings, known as "Grama Sabhas," simultaneously in 13,326 gram panchayats on 23 August 2024. The aim was to identify works to be undertaken under the MGNREGS and pass resolutions for infrastructure development in villages, focusing on curbing corruption and avoiding resource wastage. Chief Minister Naidu, along with ministers and MLAs, also participated in the program at various gram panchayats. The World Records Union awarded Kalyan a medal and certificate for setting a record by conducting massive Grama Sabhas in a single day and passing resolutions for Rs. 4,500 crore worth of work in villages.

22–23 October 2024 – The Amaravati Drone Summit 2024, held on 22 October at Punnami Ghat on the banks of the Krishna River, was a two-day event aimed at promoting investment in drone technology. The summit was attended by over 4,000 participants, including the Chief Minister, Naidu and the Union Civil Aviation Minister, Kinjarapu Ram Mohan Naidu. A drone display featuring over 5,500 drones achieved five Guinness World Records with formations such as the national flag, Lord Buddha, an airplane, and a drone. The Chief Minister announced the allocation of 300 acres of land in Orvakal of Kurnool district, for a drone hub and a plan to train 35,000 drone pilots, positioning Andhra Pradesh as a key resource center for drone technology.

20 November 2024 – The Cabinet of Andhra Pradesh has approved the establishment of a permanent Bench of the High Court in Kurnool, and the Andhra Pradesh Legislative Assembly has adopted a resolution supporting this decision. Chief Minister Naidu stated that the resolution will be forwarded to the Andhra Pradesh High Court and the Central government. He also assured that the offices of the Lokayukta and the Human Rights Commission will remain in Kurnool.

24 November 2024 – Union Railway Minister Ashwini Vaishnaw has invited e-tenders for the construction of the South Coast Railway zone headquarters in Visakhapatnam. This project was originally announced by then Railway Minister Piyush Goyal in February 2019, fulfilling the promise made under the Andhra Pradesh Reorganisation Act, 2014. The delay was mainly caused by land allotment issues. However, after the formation of the NDA government in Andhra Pradesh under chief minister Naidu, 52.22 acres at Mudasarlova were allocated, resolving the issue.

17 January 2025 – Union Steel Minister H. D. Kumaraswamy announced a ₹11,440 crore revival package for the Visakhapatnam Steel Plant (RINL), aimed at preventing privatisation and restoring its full operational capacity of 7.3 million tonnes per annum by August 2025. The package included ₹10,300 crore in equity infusion and ₹1,140 crore in converted loans, addressing financial challenges like raw material shortages and high debt, with the state government facilitating raw material supplies through NMDC and providing security via the Special Protection Force.

2 May 2025 – Prime Minister Narendra Modi, along with chief Minister Naidu and deputy chief minister Kalyan, relaunched the construction works of Amaravati, the proposed capital city of Andhra Pradesh. The event included unveiling a 21-foot commemorative pylon, designed in the shape of the letter "A" to symbolise Amaravati, marking the restart of the project, initially launched in 2015, which had faced delays under the previous state government. Modi laid the foundation stone for 74 infrastructure projects worth ₹49,000 crore, including the Legislative Assembly, High Court, Secretariat and inaugurated projects valued at ₹57,962 crore.

== See also ==
- Andhra Pradesh Council of Ministers
- Chief ministership of N. Chandrababu Naidu
- Y. S. Jagan Mohan Reddy ministry
