= Real Time Governance Society =

E-governance initiative in Andhra Pradesh, India

Real Time Governance Society (RTGS) is an Indian e-governance initiative of chief minister N. Chandrababu Naidu from Andhra Pradesh, India. It was formed on 6 September 2017. The department reports to the concerned minister.

== History ==
The idea is to use electronic communication and technology to deploy e-governance in Andhra Pradesh. It has 13 district centers and 1 state center for reporting. Data from Andhra Pradesh Weather Forecasting and Early Warning Research Center, drones, machine learning systems, biometric systems and other surveillance systems are collated and reported through the RTGS system in real-time. A call center addresses internal grievances.

== Applications of RTGs ==
The RTGS system has been used by N. Chandrababu Naidu to evaluate the performance of MLA's from his party. When setting up meetings with party leaders prior to the 2019 elections, he used to warn the MLAs that he had all the information about them and that he would only field candidates who had the potential to win. For the same, the Chief Minister received input as well as data broken down by the constituency. The same was also used to ensure none of his ministers partook in any sand mining activity which the opposition had often attacked his party about.

Using the RTGS and IVRS technologies, the Andhra Pradesh government sent messages to about Nine Lakh people during the impending Cyclone Phethai to minimise the loss of human life. About the effectiveness of RTGS, Chandrababu Naidu observed: "We have beaten IMD in predicting the exact location of where the cyclone made the landfall".
