= Y. S. Jagan Mohan Reddy ministry =

Andhra Pradesh Council of Ministers headed by Y.S Jagan Mohan Reddy (2019-2024)

- 27th Ministry of Andhra Pradesh

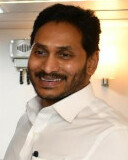
- Date formed: 30 May 2019
- Date dissolved: 11 June 2024

People and organisations
- Head of state: E. S. L. Narasimhan; Biswabhusan Harichandan; Syed Abdul Nazeer
- Head of government: Y. S. Jagan Mohan Reddy
- Ministers removed: 15
- Total no. of members: 26
- Member party: YSR Congress Party
- Status in legislature: Majority
- Opposition party: Telugu Desam Party
- Opposition leader: N. Chandrababu Naidu

History
- Election: 2019
- Legislature terms: 5 years, 12 days
- Predecessor: Third N. Chandrababu Naidu ministry
- Successor: Fourth N. Chandrababu Naidu ministry

The Y. S. Jagan Mohan Reddy ministry (or also known as 27th ministry of Andhra Pradesh) of the state of Andhra Pradesh formed the executive branch of the government of Andhra Pradesh. Along with the chief minister, there are 6 deputy chief ministers and cabinet ministers.

== Cabinet Ministers ==
Sr. No.	Name	Constituency	Portfolio	Party	Term of office		
Sr. No.	Name	Constituency	Portfolio	Party	Took office	Left office	Duration
Chief Minister
1.	Y. S. Jagan Mohan Reddy	Pulivendla	General Administration; Law & Order; Other departments not allocated to any Minister.	YSRCP	30 May 2019	11 June 2024	5 years, 12 days
Deputy Chief Ministers
2.	Rajanna Dora Peedika	Salur	Tribal Welfare	YSRCP	11 April 2022	11 June 2024	2 years, 61 days
3.	Budi Mutyala Naidu	Madugula	Panchayat Raj; Rural Development	YSRCP	11 April 2022	11 June 2024	2 years, 61 days
3.	Budi Mutyala Naidu	Madugula	Gram Volunteers / Ward Volunteers and Village Secretariats / Ward Secretaries (Panchayats Jurisdiction)	YSRCP	29 August 2022	11 June 2024	1 year, 287 days
4.	Kottu Satyanarayana	Tadepalligudem	Endowments	YSRCP	11 April 2022	11 June 2024	2 years, 61 days
5.	K. Narayana Swamy	Gangadhara Nellore	Commercial Taxes	YSRCP	30 May 2019	29 October 2021	2 years, 153 days
5.	K. Narayana Swamy	Gangadhara Nellore	Excise	YSRCP	30 May 2019	11 June 2024	5 years, 12 days
6.	Amzath Basha Shaik Bepari	Kadapa	Minority Welfare	YSRCP	30 May 2019	11 June 2024	5 years, 12 days
Cabinet Ministers
7.	Dharmana Prasada Rao	Srikakulam	Revenue; Registration & Stamps	YSRCP	11 April 2022	11 June 2024	2 years, 61 days
8.	Seediri Appalaraju	Palasa	Animal Husbandry; Dairy Development & Fisheries	YSRCP	22 July 2020	11 June 2024	3 years, 325 days
9.	Botcha Satyanarayana	Cheepurupalli	Municipal Administration & Urban Development	YSRCP	30 May 2019	10 April 2022	2 years, 315 days
9.	Botcha Satyanarayana	Cheepurupalli	Village / Ward Secretariat and Village / Ward Volunteers (Municipal jurisdiction)	YSRCP	21 September 2020	10 April 2022	1 year, 201 days
9.	Botcha Satyanarayana	Cheepurupalli	Education	YSRCP	11 April 2022	11 June 2024	2 years, 61 days
10.	Gudivada Amarnath	Anakapalle	Industries & Commerce; Infrastructure and Investments; Information Technology	YSRCP	11 April 2022	11 June 2024	2 years, 61 days
11.	Pinipe Viswarup	Amalapuram	Social Welfare	YSRCP	30 May 2019	10 April 2022	2 years, 315 days
11.	Pinipe Viswarup	Amalapuram	Transport	YSRCP	11 April 2022	11 June 2024	2 years, 61 days
12.	Chelluboyina Srinivasa Venugopalakrishna	Ramachandrapuram	Backward Classes Welfare	YSRCP	22 July 2020	11 June 2024	3 years, 325 days
12.	Chelluboyina Srinivasa Venugopalakrishna	Ramachandrapuram	Information and Public Relations; Cinematography	YSRCP	11 April 2022	11 June 2024	2 years, 61 days
13.	Taneti Vanitha	Kovvur	Women & Child Welfare	YSRCP	30 May 2019	10 April 2022	2 years, 315 days
13.	Taneti Vanitha	Kovvur	Home & Disaster Management	YSRCP	11 April 2022	11 June 2024	2 years, 61 days
14.	Karumuri Venkata Nageswara Rao	Tanuku	Civil Supplies & Consumer Affairs	YSRCP	11 April 2022	11 June 2024	2 years, 61 days
15.	Jogi Ramesh	Pedana	Housing	YSRCP	11 April 2022	11 June 2024	2 years, 61 days
16.	Merugu Nagarjuna	Vemuru	Social Welfare	YSRCP	11 April 2022	11 June 2024	2 years, 61 days
17.	Vidadala Rajini	Chilakaluripet	Health; Family Welfare & Medical Education	YSRCP	11 April 2022	11 June 2024	2 years, 61 days
18.	Ambati Rambabu	Sattenapalle	Water Resources	YSRCP	11 April 2022	11 June 2024	2 years, 61 days
19.	Audimulapu Suresh	Yerragondapalem	Education	YSRCP	30 May 2019	10 April 2022	2 years, 315 days
19.	Audimulapu Suresh	Yerragondapalem	Municipal Administration & Urban Development	YSRCP	11 April 2022	11 June 2024	2 years, 61 days
19.	Audimulapu Suresh	Yerragondapalem	Gram Volunteers / Ward Volunteers and Village Secretariats / Ward Secretaries (Municipal Jurisdiction)	YSRCP	29 August 2022	11 June 2024	1 year, 287 days
20.	Kakani Govardhan Reddy	Sarvepalli	Agriculture & Co-operation; Marketing; Food Processing	YSRCP	11 April 2022	11 June 2024	2 years, 61 days
21.	Peddireddy Ramachandra Reddy	Punganur	Panchayat Raj & Rural Development	YSRCP	30 May 2019	10 April 2022	2 years, 315 days
21.	Peddireddy Ramachandra Reddy	Punganur	Mines & Geology	YSRCP	30 May 2019	11 June 2024	5 years, 12 days
21.	Peddireddy Ramachandra Reddy	Punganur	Energy; Forests; Environment; Science & Technology	YSRCP	11 April 2022	11 June 2024	2 years, 61 days
21.	Peddireddy Ramachandra Reddy	Punganur	Village / Ward Secretariat and Village / Ward Volunteers (Panchayats jurisdiction)	YSRCP	21 September 2020	10 April 2022	1 year, 201 days
22.	R.K. Roja	Nagari	Tourism; Culture & Youth Advancement	YSRCP	11 April 2022	11 June 2024	2 years, 61 days
23.	Buggana Rajendranath Reddy	Dhone	Finance & Planning; Legislative Affairs	YSRCP	30 May 2019	11 June 2024	5 years, 12 days
23.	Buggana Rajendranath Reddy	Dhone	Commercial Taxes	YSRCP	30 October 2021	11 June 2024	2 years, 225 days
23.	Buggana Rajendranath Reddy	Dhone	Skill Development and Training	YSRCP	14 March 2022	11 June 2024	2 years, 89 days
23.	Buggana Rajendranath Reddy	Dhone	Industries; Commerce; Information Technology; Infrastructure and Investments	YSRCP	14 March 2022	7 April 2022	24 days
24.	Gummanur Jayaram	Alur	Labour; Employment; Training; Factories	YSRCP	31 May 2019	5 March 2024	4 years, 279 days
25.	K. V. Ushashri Charan	Kalyandurg	Women & Child Welfare; Differently Abled & Senior Citizens Welfare	YSRCP	11 April 2022	11 June 2024	2 years, 61 days
26.	Dadisetti Ramalingeswara Rao	Tuni	Roads & Buildings	YSRCP	11 April 2022	11 June 2024	2 years, 61 days

== Ministers by District ==
No.	District	Total	Ministers
1	Alluri Sitharama Raju	–	–
2	Anakapalli	2	Budi Mutyala Naidu (Deputy Chief Minister); Gudivada Amarnath
3	Anantapur	1	K. V. Ushashri Charan
4	Annamayya	–	–
5	Bapatla	1	Merugu Nagarjuna
6	Chittoor	3	Peddireddy Ramachandra Reddy; K. Narayana Swamy (Deputy Chief Minister); R.K Roja
7	Dr. B. R. Ambedkar Konaseema	2	Pinipe Viswarup; Chelluboyina Srinivasa Venugopalakrishna
8	East Godavari	1	Taneti Vanita
9	Eluru	–	–
10	Guntur	–	–
11	Kakinada	1	Dadisetti Ramalingeswara Rao
12	Krishna	1	Jogi Ramesh
13	Kurnool	1	Gummanur Jayaram
14	Nandyal	1	Buggana Rajendranath
15	NTR	–	–
16	Palnadu	2	Vidadala Rajini; Ambati Rambabu
17	Parvathipuram Manyam	1	Rajanna Dora Peedika (Deputy Chief Minister)
18	Prakasam	1	Audimulapu Suresh
19	Nellore	1	Kakani Govardhan Reddy
20	Sri Sathya Sai	–	–
21	Srikakulam	2	Dharmana Prasada Rao; Seediri Appalaraju
22	Tirupati	–	–
23	Visakhapatnam	–	–
24	Vizianagaram	1	Botcha Satyanarayana
25	West Godavari	2	Kottu Satyanarayana (Deputy Chief Minister); Karumuri Venkata Nageswara Rao
26	YSR	2	Y. S. Jagan Mohan Reddy (Chief Minister); Amzath Basha Shaik Bepari (Deputy Chief Minister)

== Previous Cabinet Ministers ==
Sr. No.	Name	Constituency	Portfolio	Party	Term of office		
Sr. No.	Name	Constituency	Portfolio	Party	Took office	Left office	Duration
Cabinet Ministers
1.	Mekathoti Sucharitha	Prathipadu	Home & Disaster Management	YSRCP	30 May 2019	10 April 2022	2 years, 315 days
2.	Kodali Nani	Gudivada	Civil Supplies & Consumer Affairs	YSRCP	30 May 2019	10 April 2022	2 years, 315 days
3.	Alla Nani	Eluru	Health; Family Welfare & Medical Education	YSRCP	30 May 2019	10 April 2022	2 years, 315 days
4.	Perni Venkataramaiah	Machilipatnam	Transport; Information & Public Relations	YSRCP	30 May 2019	10 April 2022	2 years, 315 days
4.	Perni Venkataramaiah	Machilipatnam	Cinematography	YSRCP	15 December 2021	10 April 2022	116 days
5.	Vellampalli Srinivas	Vijayawada West	Endowments	YSRCP	30 May 2019	10 April 2022	2 years, 315 days
6.	Dharmana Krishna Das	Narasannapeta	Roads & Buildings	YSRCP	30 May 2019	21 July 2020	1 year, 52 days
6.	Dharmana Krishna Das	Narasannapeta	Deputy Chief Minister; Revenue; Registrations & Stamps	YSRCP	22 July 2020	10 April 2022	1 year, 262 days
7.	Malagundla Sankaranarayana	Penukonda	Backward Classes Welfare	YSRCP	30 May 2019	21 July 2020	1 year, 52 days
7.	Malagundla Sankaranarayana	Penukonda	Roads & Buildings	YSRCP	22 July 2020	10 April 2022	1 year, 262 days
8.	Pamula Pushpa Sreevani	Kurupam	Deputy Chief Minister; Tribal Welfare	YSRCP	30 May 2019	10 April 2022	2 years, 315 days
9.	Muttamsetti Srinivasa Rao	Bheemili	Tourism; Culture & Youth Advancement	YSRCP	30 May 2019	10 April 2022	2 years, 315 days
10.	Cherukuvada Sri Ranganadha Raju	Achanta	Housing	YSRCP	30 May 2019	10 April 2022	2 years, 315 days
11.	Anil Kumar Poluboina	Nellore City	Irrigation (Water Resources)	YSRCP	30 May 2019	10 April 2022	2 years, 315 days
12.	Balineni Srinivasa Reddy	Ongole	Energy; Forest; Environment; Science & Technology	YSRCP	30 May 2019	10 April 2022	2 years, 315 days
13.	Kurasala Kannababu	Kakinada Rural	Agriculture & Co-operation	YSRCP	30 May 2019	10 April 2022	2 years, 315 days
13.	Kurasala Kannababu	Kakinada Rural	Marketing; Food Processing (under the purview of Industries & Commerce department)	YSRCP	30 January 2020	10 April 2022	2 years, 70 days
14.	Mekapati Goutham Reddy	Atmakur	Industries; Commerce; Information Technology	YSRCP	30 May 2019	20 February 2022	2 years, 266 days
14.	Mekapati Goutham Reddy	Atmakur	Skill Development and Training	YSRCP	24 January 2020	20 February 2022	2 years, 27 days
14.	Mekapati Goutham Reddy	Atmakur	Infrastructure & Investments	YSRCP	30 April 2020	20 February 2022	1 year, 296 days
15.	Pilli Subhash Chandra Bose	MLC	Deputy Chief Minister; Revenue; Registration & Stamps	YSRCP	30 May 2019	21 July 2020	1 year, 52 days
16.	Mopidevi Venkataramana	MLC	Animal Husbandry; Fisheries	YSRCP	30 May 2019	21 July 2020	1 year, 52 days
16.	Mopidevi Venkataramana	MLC	Marketing	YSRCP	30 May 2019	29 January 2020	244 days
