= Andhra Pradesh Legislature =

State legislature of Andhra Pradesh

Andhra Pradesh Legislature ఆంధ్రప్రదేశ్ శాసన వ్యవస్థ Āndhra Pradēś Śāsana Vyavasthā

Type
- Type: Bicameral Legislature of the Andhra Pradesh
- Houses: Śāsana Mandali (Upper House); Saasana Sabha (Lower House)

Leadership
- Governor: S. Abdul Nazeer since 13 February 2023
- Chairperson (Śāsana Pariṣattu): Koyye Moshenu Raju, YSRCP since 19 November 2021
- Deputy Chairperson (Śāsana Pariṣattu): Zakia Khanam, BJP since 19 November 2021
- Leader of the House (Śāsana Pariṣattu) (Chief Minister): N. Chandrababu Naidu, TDP since 12 June 2024
- Leader of the Opposition (Śāsana Pariṣattu): Botsa Satyanarayana, YSRCP since 22 August 2024
- Speaker (Saasana Sabha): Chintakayala Ayyanna Patrudu, TDP since 22 June 2024
- Deputy Speaker (Śāsana Sabha): Raghu Rama Krishna Raju, TDP since 14 November 2024
- Leader of the House (Chief Minister) (Śāsana Sabha): N. Chandrababu Naidu, TDP since 12 June 2024
- Leader of the Opposition (Śāsana Sabha): Vacant since 4 June 2024

Structure
- Seats: 58 (Śāsana Pariṣattu); 175 (Śāsana Sabha)
- Śāsana Pariṣattu political groups: Government (14) Kutami (14): TDP (10); JSP (2); BJP (2); Official Opposition (33) YSRCP (33) Other Opposition (5) IND (5) Vacant (6) Vacant (6)
- Śāsana Sabha political groups: Government (164) Kutami (164): TDP (135); JSP (21); BJP (8); Official Opposition Vacant (Note: No official opposition because no political party obtained at least 10% of the seats in the assembly) Other Opposition (11) YSRCP (11)

Elections
- Śāsana Pariṣattu voting system: Single transferable vote
- Śāsana Sabha voting system: First past the post
- Last Śāsana Sabha election: 13 May 2024

Meeting place
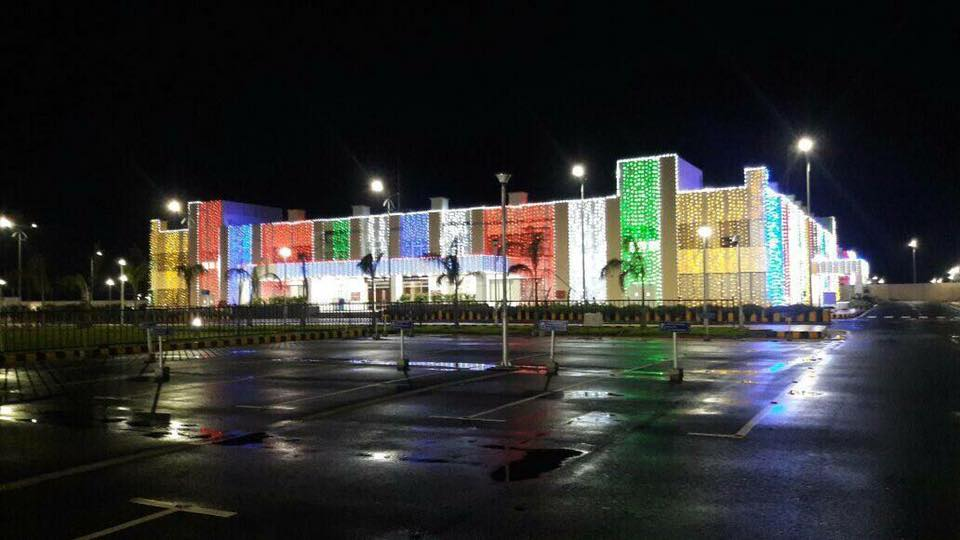
- Assembly Building; Amaravati, Andhra Pradesh, India

Website
- www.aplegislature.org

The Andhra Pradesh Legislature is the state legislature of the Indian state of Andhra Pradesh. It follows a Westminster-derived parliamentary system and is composed of an

- Appointed Governor of Andhra Pradesh
- The indirectly-elected Andhra Pradesh Sasana Parishattu
- The popularly-elected Andhra Pradesh Sasana Sabha.

The Legislature works at the transit building located in the state capital Amaravati.The legislature derives its authority from the Indian constitution, with sole authority to make laws on 61 subjects specified in the state list and shares law-making power in 52 concurrent subjects with the Parliament of India. The state uses first-past-the-post method territorial constituencies for electing members to the lower house. The members of the upper house are indirectly-elected by special constituencies or nominated by the governor. The governor is head of the state authorized to the leader of the legislature.

== History ==
Andhra Pradesh, the first linguistic state and once the fifth largest state in the Indian union, was formed on 1 November 1956 with the unification of Andhra State and the Telugu speaking areas of the erstwhile Hyderabad State. Consequent to the formation of the State of Andhra Pradesh the 140 Members of the Andhra State Legislative Assembly and 105 Members representing the Telugu speaking areas of Hyderabad State were merged resulting in the formation of the Andhra Pradesh Legislative Assembly.

In 1956, the Andhra Pradesh Legislature was Unicameral with only a Legislative Assembly consisting of 245 Members. The first meeting of the Andhra Pradesh Legislative Assembly was held on 3 December 1956. Ayyadevara Kaleswara Rao and Konda Lakshman Bapuji were elected as the first Speaker and the first Deputy Speaker respectively of the Andhra Pradesh Legislative Assembly.

In 1958, with the constitution of the Legislative Council the unicameral Andhra Pradesh Legislature has become bicameral. Due to delimitation of constituencies several ups and downs have taken place in the number of elected Members of Legislative Assembly in Andhra Pradesh. In 1956 it was 245, in 1962 it was 300, in 1967 and 1972 it was 287 and from 1978 onwards it is 294. In 2014, the state was bifurcated into Andhra Pradesh and Telangana. The present strength of the Andhra Pradesh Legislative Assembly is 175.

B. V. Subba Reddy was the only Presiding Officer who has been elected twice as Speaker in 1962 and 1967 unanimously in the Third and Fourth Andhra Pradesh Legislative Assembly. The most significant feature of the Fourth Legislative Assembly is that it has the highest number of Independents in the House. Out of the 294 elected Members of the Legislative Assembly 68 Members were Independents. P. Ranga Reddy, who has been elected as Speaker in 1972 by the Fifth Andhra Pradesh Legislative Assembly also served as the Chairman of the Andhra Pradesh Legislative Council from 1968 to 1972. He was the only person who has served as the Presiding Officer for both the Houses of Andhra Pradesh Legislature. He was also appointed as Pro-tem Speaker for the Eighth Andhra Pradesh Legislative Assembly in 1985.

In the history of the Andhra Pradesh Legislature the Seventh Legislative Assembly was the shortest Assembly in terms of its tenure. Another important feature of the Seventh Assembly was when the first Confidence Motion was moved and carried in the House on 20 September 1984. The Eleventh Legislative Assembly which was constituted on 10 October 1999 elected K. Prathibha Bharathi as Speaker, the first women Presiding Officer of the Andhra Pradesh Legislature.

A. P. J. Abdul Kalam, the President of India addressed the Twelfth Legislative Assembly on 14 July 2004. It was the second time in the history of the Andhra Pradesh Legislature that the First Citizen of India has addressed the Legislative Assembly. Previously, Dr. Neelam Sanjeeva Reddy addressed the Members of the Legislature on 28 June 1978.

== Structure and lawmaking process ==
According to the Indian Constitution, every state in India shall have a legislature consisting of the Governor and a legislative assembly. Further, the legislative assembly of the state can decide to create an upper house – the council or abolish the upper house at any point of time. This relation between the two houses was specified in the constitution to strike a balance between large and small states – with the former demanding for more political participation, while the latter citing financial constraints in maintaining two houses. Andhra Pradesh is one of the few states in India to have a bicameral legislature. The state established an upper house in 1957, abolished in 1985 and re-established it in 2007.

The upper house cannot be dissolved and one third of its members retire every second year. The term of the legislative assembly is five years from the date appointed for its first meeting. The cabinet is collectively responsible to the lower house and is in power as long as it enjoys the confidence of the lower house. Ministers are generally members of the lower house, however, they can be a member of either house.

A bill can originate in either house, though money bills can originate only in the lower house. The upper house can only suggest modifications to the bill which is passed by the assembly. If the assembly decides to ignore the changes made by the upper house in its second reading, the council has to accept the bill in original form passed by the assembly. The only power of the council, in ordinary or money bills is to introduce some delay into the legislative process. The bill is then sent to the Governor, who may sign the bill converting it into law or reject it.

== Membership and elections ==
Of the total number of Members of the Legislative Council (58), one third of Members are elected by electorates consisting of the Members of Local Authorities(20), 1/12 are elected by electorates consisting of graduates residing in the State(5), 1/12 are elected by electorates consisting of persons engaged in teaching(5), 1/3 are elected by the Members of Legislative Assembly (20) and the remaining are nominated by the Governor(8). The specified electorate is divided into territorial constituencies and members are elected on a first-past-the-post basis.

The Legislative Assembly consists of 175 elected members. All persons residing in the state above the age of 18 are eligible to vote in the elections.

== Seat of the assembly ==
The assembly meets at temporary facilities in the Velagapudi neighbourhood of the new capital city of Andhra Pradesh, Amaravati, having relocated there in March 2017. The first session of the legislature at the new capital began on 6 March 2017.

The assembly met at the State Assembly Building in Hyderabad till March 2017. This was built in 1913 and adjoins the picturesque public gardens known as the hanging gardens.

== Composition by party ==
S.No.	Name	MLA	MLC
1	Telugu Desam Party (TDP)	135	12
2	Janasena Party (JSP)	21	2
3	YSR Congress Party (YSRCP)	11	33
4	Bharatiya Janata Party (BJP)	8	1
5	Independents (IND)	0	5
6	Vacant	0	5
Total		175	58

== List of Legislative Assembly constituencies ==
There are a total of 175 Assembly Constituencies, across 26 divided districts, in the state of Andhra Pradesh.

Constituencies by district in Andhra Pradesh
Srikakulam	8	Amadalavalasa, Etcherla, Ichchapuram, Narasannapeta, Palasa, Pathapatnam, Srikakulam, Tekkali
Parvathipuram Manyam	4	Parvathipuram, Palakonda, Kurupam, Saluru
Vizianagaram	7	Bobbili, Cheepurupalli, Gajapathinagaram, Nellimarla, Srungavarapukota, Rajam, Vizianagaram
Visakhapatnam	6+1(partially)	Bheemili, Gajuwaka, Pendurthi(partially), Visakhapatnam Thurpu, Visakhapatnam Uttaram, Visakhapatnam Dakhinam, Visakhapatnam Padamara
Anakapalli	6+1(partially)	Chodavaram, Madugula, Anakapalli, Pendurthi(partially), Elamanchili, Payakaraopeta, Narsipatnam
Alluri district	3	Araku Loya, Paderu, Rampachodavaram
Kakinada	7	Jaggampeta, Kakinada Nagaram, Kakinada Graminam, Peddapuram, Pithapuram, Prathipadu, Tuni
East Godavari	7	Anaparthy, Rajanagaram, Rajamahendravaram City, Rajamahendravaram Rural, Kovvuru, Nidadavole, Gopalapuram
Konaseema	7	Ramachandrapuram, Mummidivaram, Amalapuram, Razole, Gannavaram, Kothapeta, Mandapeta
Eluru	7	Unguturu, Denduluru, Eluru, Polavaram, Chintalapudi, Nuzavidu, Kaikaluru
West Godavari	7	Bhimavaram, Narasapuram, Palakollu, Tadepalligudem, Tanuku, Undi, Unguturu
NTR	7+1(partially)	Tiruvuru, Gannavaram (Part), Vijayawada Pdamara, Vijayawada Madya, Vijayawada Thurpu, Mylavaram, Nandigama, Jaggayyapeta
Krishna	6+1(partially)	Avanigadda, Gannavaram (Part), Gudivada, Pedana, Machilipatnam, Machilipatnam, Pamarru, Penamaluru
Guntur	7	Tadikonda, Mangalagiri, Ponnuru, Tenali, Prathipadu, Gunturu Padamara, Gunturu Thurpu
Palnadu	7	Narasaraopet, Chilakaluripet, Sattenapalle, Gurazala, Pedakurapadu, Macherla, Vinukonda
Bapatla	6	Vemuru, Repalle, Bapatla, Parchuru, Addanki, Chirala
Prakasam	8	Santhanuthalapadu, Yerragondapalem, Darsi, Ongole, Kondapi, Markapuram, Giddaluru, Kanigiri
Sri Potti Sriramulu Nellore	8	Sarvepalli, Kandukuru, Kavali, Atmakuru, Kovuru, Nellore Nagaram, Nellore Graminam, Udayagiri
Kurnool	7+1(partially)	Kurnool, Kodumuru, Yemmiganur, Mantralayam, Adoni, Aluru, Pattikonda, Panyam (partially)
Nandyala	6+1(partially)	Allagadda, Srisailam, Nandikotkuru, Nandyala, Banaganapalle, Dhonachalam, Panyam (partially)
Kadapa	7+1(partially)	Badvelu, Jammalamadugu, Kadapa, Kamalapuram, Mydukuru, Proddaturu, Pulivendula, Rajampeta (partial)
Anantapuram	8	Raptadu, Rayadurgam, Uravakonda, Guntakallu, Tadpatri, Singanamala, Anantapuram Nagaram, Kalyandurgam
Sri Sathya Sai	6	Madakasira, Hindupuram, Penukonda, Puttaparthi, Dharmavaram, Kadiri
Annamayya	6+1(partially)	Rajampeta (partially), Koduru, Rayachoti, Thamballapalle, Pileru, Madanapalle
Tirupati	7+1(partially)	Tirupati, Sullurpeta, Venkatagiri, Guduru, Srikalahasti, Satyavedu, Chandragiri, Nagari (partially)
Chittoor	6+1(partially)	Chittoor, Gangadhara Nellore (SC), Kuppam, Nagari (partially), Palamaneru, Puthalapattu, Punganur

== Legislative Assembly terms ==
The following are the years of constitution and dissolution of the Andhra Pradesh Legislative Assembly.

Assembly	Constitution	First sitting	Date of expiry of Term (Article 172(1) of the Constitution)	Dissolution	Notes
1st	1 October 1953			15 November 1954	1st Andhra Legislative Assembly
2nd	3 March 1955	23 April 1955	10 April 1962 (Note: The first meeting of the Andhra Pradesh Legislative Assembly, which was formed on 1 November 1956 with the unification of Andhra State and the Telugu-speaking areas of the erstwhile Hyderabad State, was held on 3 December 1956. In 1957, elections were conducted in the newly added region of Telangana alone, and the members of that Assembly first met on 11 April 1962.)	1 March 1962	Legislative Council established
3rd	3 March 1962	19 March 1962	18 March 1967	28 February 1967	
4th	1 March 1967	18 March 1967	17 March 1972	14 March 1972	
5th	14 March 1972	20 March 1972	19 March 1977	1 March 1978 (Note: Fifth Legislative Assembly term was extended by one year due to declaration of internal emergency in the country and it was continued up to 1978.)	
6th	5 March 1978	15 March 1978	14 March 1983	7 January 1983	
7th	8 January 1983	17 January 1983	16 January 1988	23 November 1984	
8th	8 March 1985	11 March 1985	10 March 1990	28 November 1989	Legislative Council abolished
9th	30 November 1989	03 January 1990	02 January 1995	10 December 1994	
10th	12 December 1994	11 January 1995	10 January 2000	09 October 1999	
11th	10 October 1999	10 November 1999	09 November 2004	14 November 2003	
12th	12 May 2004	31 May 2004	30 May 2009	19 May 2009	Legislative Council re-established
13th	19 May 2009	03 June 2009	02 June 2014	28 April 2014	
14th	01 May 2014	19 June 2014	18 June 2019	23 May 2019	First assembly after reorganization of the state
15th	26 May 2019	12 June 2019	11 June 2024	5 June 2024	
16th	06 June 2024	21 June 2024	20 June 2029		

== List of Secretary Generals ==
Prasanna Kumar Suryadevara is presently serving as the Secretary General to the State Legislature.

List of Secretaries:

S. No.	Name	Tenure
1	G. V. Chowdary	November 1956 to February 1970
2	A. Shankar Reddy	March 1970 to February 1975
3	G. Ramachandra Naidu	March 1975 to April 1977
4	K. Srirama Chary	May 1977 to October 1978
5	E. Sadasiva Reddy	November 1978 to October 1988
5	C. Venkatesan	November 1988 to March 1990
6	A. V. G. Krishna Murthy	March 1990 to June 1996
7	B. Subba Rao	Only on 30 April 1997
8	S. D. Kamalakar	8 August 1997 to 30 September 1999
9	K. Tuljanand Singh	6 March 2000 to December 2008
10	Dr. S. Raja Sadaram	10 January 2009 to 1 June 2014
11	K. Satyanarayana Rao (In-charge)	2 June 2014 to 14 June 2017
12	P. P. K. Ramacharyulu (Special Secretary)	8 June 2017 to 14 September 2017
13	M. Vijaya Raju (In-charge)	15 September 2017 to 8 June 2019
14	P. Balakrishnamacharyulu	July 2019 to March 2023
15	Dr. P. P. K. Ramacharyulu	23 March 2023 to July 2024
16	Prasanna Kumar Suryadevara	15 July 2024 to Incumbent

Past Special Secretaries:

S. No.	Name	Tenure
1	C. Venkatesan	March 1995 to March 2000

== See also ==
- Elections in Andhra Pradesh
- List of chairpersons of the Andhra Pradesh Legislative Council
