= 14th Andhra Pradesh Assembly =

14th lower house of the andhra Pradesh Legislature (2014–2019)

14th Legislative Assembly of Andhra Pradesh
←	13th	15th	→
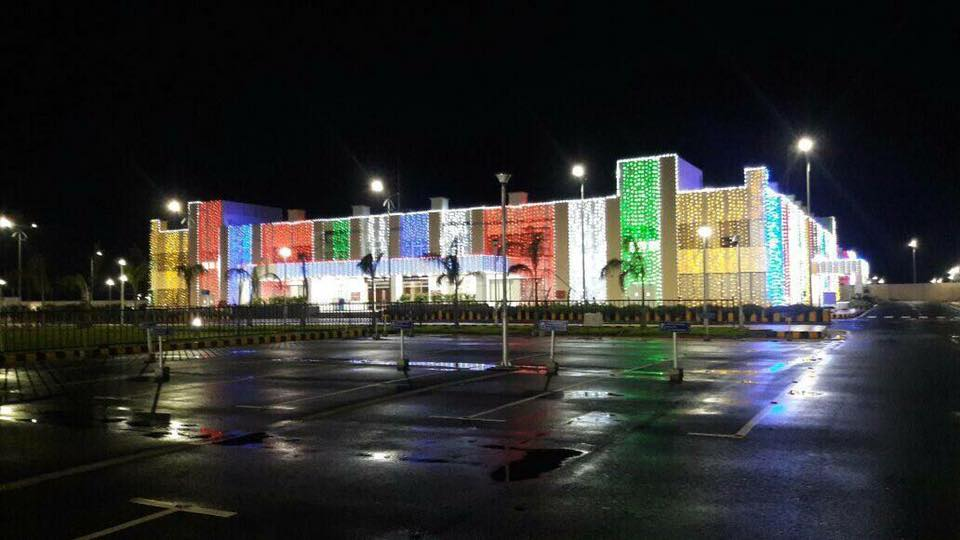
- Assembly Building; Amaravati, Andhra Pradesh, India

Overview
- Legislative body: Andhra Pradesh Legislature
- Term: 19 June 2014 – 23 May 2019
- Election: 2014 Andhra Pradesh Legislative Assembly election
- Government: N. Chandrababu Naidu ministry

Nominal Executive
- Governor: E. S. L. Narasimhan

Andhra Pradesh Legislative Assembly
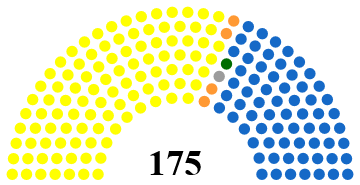
- Members: 175
- Speaker: Kodela Siva Prasada Rao
- Leader of the House: N. Chandrababu Naidu
- Chief Minister: N. Chandrababu Naidu
- Leader of the Opposition: Y. S. Jagan Mohan Reddy
- Party control: TDP

The Fourteenth Legislative Assembly of Andhra Pradesh was formed by the members elected in the 2014 Andhra Pradesh Legislative Assembly election. Election to Andhra Pradesh Legislative Assembly took place in single phase on 7th May 2014 by the Election Commission of India. Counting started officially on the morning of 16 May 2014 and the results were declared on the same day.

== Composition ==
=== Presiding officers ===
As of May 2019
Designation	Portrait	Name
Governor		E. S. L. Narasimhan
Speaker		Kodela Siva Prasada Rao (TDP)
Deputy Speaker		Mandali Buddha Prasad (TDP)
Leader of the House		N. Chandrababu Naidu (TDP)
Leader of the Opposition		Y. S. Jagan Mohan Reddy (YSRCP)

=== Members ===
Party	Members as of	
Party	May 2014	May 2019
Telugu Desam Party	102	125
YSR Congress Party	67	44
Bharatiya Janata Party	4	4
Others	1	0
Independent	1	0
Total	175	

== See also ==
- Andhra Pradesh Legislature
