= Chief Minister of Andhra Pradesh =

Leader of the executive branch of Government of Andhra Pradesh

- Āndhra Pradēś Mukhya Mantrī
- Emblem of Andhra Pradesh

- Flag of India

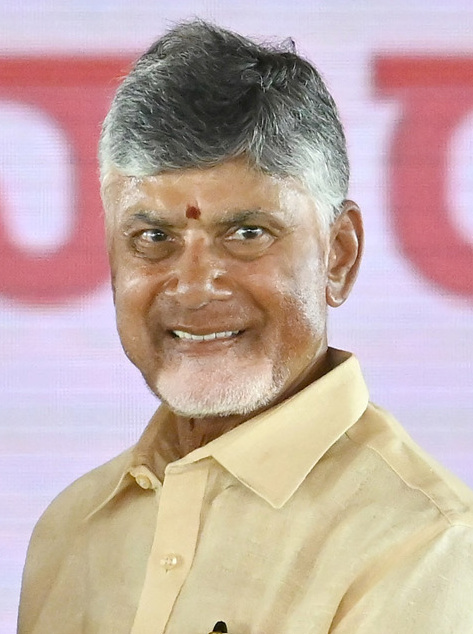
- Incumbent; N. Chandrababu Naidu since 12 June 2024
- Chief Minister's Office; Government of Andhra Pradesh
- Style: The Honourable
- Type: Leader of the Executive
- Status: Head of government
- Abbreviation: CMoAP
- Member of: State Legislature; State Cabinet
- Reports to: Governor of Andhra Pradesh; Andhra Pradesh Legislature
- Residence: Amaravati
- Seat: Andhra Pradesh Secretariat, Amaravati
- Appointer: The Governor of Andhra Pradesh; by convention based on appointees ability to command confidence in the Legislative Assembly
- Term length: Five years and subject to no term limit; at the confidence of the Legislative Assembly
- Inaugural holder: Neelam Sanjeeva Reddy
- Formation: 1 November 1956; 70 years ago
- Deputy: Deputy Chief Minister of Andhra Pradesh
- Salary: ₹335,000 (US$3,500
- Website: Official website

The chief minister of Andhra Pradesh is the head of government of the Indian state of Andhra Pradesh. As per the Constitution of India, the state's governor is the state's de jure head, and the de facto executive authority rests with the chief minister. Following elections to the Andhra Pradesh Legislative Assembly, the governor usually invites the party (or coalition) with a majority of seats to form the government. The governor appoints the chief minister, whose council of ministers are collectively responsible to the assembly. Given that he has the confidence of the assembly, the chief minister's term is for five years and is subject to no term limits. Usually, the chief minister also serves as leader of the house in the legislative assembly.

Since 1953, there have been 19 chief ministers, with the majority belonging to the Indian National Congress (INC). In 1953, Tanguturi Prakasam from the INC became the first chief minister of the Andhra State. In 1956, Neelam Sanjeeva Reddy from the INC became the first chief minister of Andhra Pradesh following the reorganisation of Indian states. The longest-serving chief minister was N. Chandrababu Naidu from the Telugu Desam Party (TDP), who held the office for over thirteen years across multiple terms, while N. Bhaskara Rao from the TDP had the shortest tenure of 31 days. N. Chandrababu Naidu was also the first chief minister of the residuary Andhra Pradesh following the formation of Telangana in 2014.

Notably, Neelam Sanjeeva Reddy later became the President of India, while P. V. Narasimha Rao, also from the INC and the fourth chief minister of Andhra Pradesh went on to serve as the Prime Minister of India. N. T. Rama Rao from the TDP was the first non-INC chief minister of the state. There have been three instances of President's rule in Andhra Pradesh, most recently in 2014.

The incumbent chief minister of the state is N. Chandrababu Naidu from the TDP, since 12 June 2024.

== History ==
The Andhra State, a precursor to the modern state of Andhra Pradesh, was established on 1 October 1953, following the Andhra movement. The formation of Andhra State was made possible by the Andhra State Act, which was passed in the Parliament of India in September 1953. This significant development was ignited by a determined fast led by Potti Sreeramulu, whose sacrifice ultimately catalysed the demand for a new linguistic state.

The newly created Andhra State included 11 districts in the Telugu-speaking region of the Madras State, with Kurnool as its capital and a unicameral parliamentary system with a legislative assembly chamber.

A total of two people have served as the chief minister during the period, of which both of them belonged to the Indian National Congress. Bezawada Gopala Reddy was the longest-serving chief minister of the region during this period. Chandulal Madhavlal Trivedi was the only governor in office during this period.

Andhra Pradesh was officially created on 1 November 1956, through the enactment of the States Reorganisation Act in August 1956. This led to the dissolution of Hyderabad State, with its divisions becoming part of Mysore State and Bombay State. Concurrently, the integration of Telugu-speaking regions into Andhra State laid the foundation of a bicameral parliamentary system consisting of Legislative Council and Legislative Assembly chambers.

Originally situated in Hyderabad, the capital later moved to Amaravati in 2017 following the implementation of the Andhra Pradesh Reorganisation Act, which led to the formation of Telangana on 2 June 2014 and a reduction in the assembly constituencies from 294 to 175. Despite these significant boundary changes, the state continued to be recognised as Andhra Pradesh.

Currently, there are a total of 175 assembly constituencies in the state. The legislative council is the upper house with 58 members. The INC are the longest-ruling political parties in the state of Andhra Pradesh.

== Chief Ministers of Andhra Pradesh ==
Key

- No.: Incumbent number
- ^{§} Returned to office after a previous non-consecutive term
- ^{†} Died in office
- ^{RES} Resigned
- ^{DIS} Dismissed

Portrait	Minister (Birth-Death) Constituency	Election	Term of office			Political party	Ministry
Portrait	Minister (Birth-Death) Constituency	Election	From	To	Period	Political party	Ministry
State of Andhra (1953–1956)
	Tanguturi Prakasam (1872–1957) –	– (1st)	1 October 1953	15 November 1954	1 year, 45 days	Indian National Congress	Prakasam
Position vacant (15 November 1954 – 28 March 1955); President's rule was imposed during this period (Note: President's rule may be imposed when the "government in a state is not able to function as per the Constitution", which often happens because no party or coalition has a majority in the assembly. When the President's rule is in force in a state, its council of ministers stands dissolved. The office of chief minister thus lies vacant, and the administration is taken over by the governor, who functions on behalf of the central government. At times, the legislative assembly also stands dissolved.)
	Bezawada Gopala Reddy (1907–1997); MLA for Atmakur	1955 (2nd)	28 March 1955	31 October 1956	1 year, 217 days	Indian National Congress	Gopala
State of Andhra Pradesh (1956–2014)
	Neelam Sanjiva Reddy (1913–1996); MLA for Srikalahasti	1955 (1st)	1 November 1956	16 April 1957	3 years, 71 days	Indian National Congress	Neelam I
	Neelam Sanjiva Reddy (1913–1996); MLA for Srikalahasti	1957 (2nd)	17 April 1957	11 January 1960^{[RES]}	3 years, 71 days	Indian National Congress	Neelam II
	Damodaram Sanjivayya (1921–1972); MLA for Kurnool	1957 (2nd)	11 January 1960	12 March 1962	2 years, 60 days	Indian National Congress	Sanjivayya
	Neelam Sanjiva Reddy (1913–1996); MLA for Dhone	1962 (3rd)	12 March 1962^{[§]}	20 February 1964^{[RES]}	1 year, 345 days	Indian National Congress	Neelam III
	Kasu Brahmananda Reddy (1909–1994); MLA for Narasaraopet	1962 (3rd)	21 February 1964	20 February 1964	7 years, 221 days	Indian National Congress	Kasu I
	Kasu Brahmananda Reddy (1909–1994); MLA for Narasaraopet	1967 (4th)	20 February 1964	30 September 1971	7 years, 221 days	Indian National Congress	Kasu II
	P. V. Narasimha Rao (1921–2004); MLA for Manthani	1967 (4th)	30 September 1971	20 March 1972	1 year, 102 days	Indian National Congress (Requisitionists)	Narasimha I
	P. V. Narasimha Rao (1921–2004); MLA for Manthani	1972 (5th)	20 March 1972	10 January 1973	1 year, 102 days	Indian National Congress (Requisitionists)	Narasimha II
Position vacant (11 January 1973 – 10 December 1973); President's rule was imposed during the period (18 January 1973 – 10 December 1973)
	Jalagam Vengala Rao (1921–1999); MLA for Vemsoor	1972 (5th)	10 December 1973	6 March 1978	4 years, 86 days	Indian National Congress (Requisitionists)	Jalagam
	Marri Chenna Reddy (1919–1996); MLA for Medchal	1978 (6th)	6 March 1978	10 October 1980^{[RES]}	2 years, 218 days	Indian National Congress (Indira)	Chenna I
	Tanguturi Anjaiah (1919–1986); MLC	1978 (6th)	11 October 1980	24 February 1982^{[RES]}	1 year, 136 days	Indian National Congress (Indira)	Anjaiah
	Bhavanam Venkatarami Reddy (1931–2002); MLC	1978 (6th)	24 February 1982	20 September 1982^{[RES]}	208 days	Indian National Congress (Indira)	Bhavanam
	Kotla Vijaya Bhaskara Reddy (1920–2001); MLA for Kurnool	1978 (6th)	20 September 1982	9 January 1983	111 days	Indian National Congress (Indira)	Kotla I
	Nandamuri Taraka Rama Rao (1923–1996); MLA for Tirupati	1983 (7th)	9 January 1983	16 August 1984^{[DIS]}	1 year, 220 days	Telugu Desam Party	Taraka I
	Nadendla Bhaskara Rao (1935–2026); MLA for Vemuru	1983 (7th)	16 August 1984	16 September 1984^{[RES]}	31 days	Telugu Desam Party	Bhaskara
	Nandamuri Taraka Rama Rao (1923–1996); MLA for Tirupati, until 1985; MLA for Hindupur, from 1985	1983 (7th)	16 September 1984^{[§]}	9 March 1985	5 years, 77 days	Telugu Desam Party	Taraka II
	Nandamuri Taraka Rama Rao (1923–1996); MLA for Tirupati, until 1985; MLA for Hindupur, from 1985	1985 (8th)	9 March 1985	2 December 1989	5 years, 77 days	Telugu Desam Party	Taraka III
	Marri Chenna Reddy (1919–1996); MLA for Sanathnagar	1989 (9th)	3 December 1989^{[§]}	17 December 1990^{[RES]}	1 year, 14 days	Indian National Congress (Indira)	Chenna II
	Nedurumalli Janardhana Reddy (1935–2014); MLA for Venkatagiri	1989 (9th)	17 December 1990	9 October 1992^{[RES]}	1 year, 297 days	Indian National Congress (Indira)	Janardhana
	Kotla Vijaya Bhaskara Reddy (1920–2001); MLA for Panyam	1989 (9th)	9 October 1992^{[§]}	12 December 1994	2 years, 64 days	Indian National Congress (Indira)	Kotla II
	Nandamuri Taraka Rama Rao (1923–1996); MLA for Hindupur	1994 (10th)	12 December 1994^{[§]}	1 September 1995^{[RES]}	263 days	Telugu Desam Party	Taraka IV
	N. Chandrababu Naidu (born 1950); MLA for Kuppam	1994 (10th)	1 September 1995	11 October 1999	8 years, 255 days	Telugu Desam Party	Naidu I
	N. Chandrababu Naidu (born 1950); MLA for Kuppam	1999 (11th)	11 October 1999	13 May 2004	8 years, 255 days	Telugu Desam Party	Naidu II
	Y. S. Rajasekhara Reddy (1949–2009); MLA for Pulivendla	2004 (12th)	14 May 2004	20 May 2009	5 years, 111 days	Indian National Congress	Rajasekhara I
	Y. S. Rajasekhara Reddy (1949–2009); MLA for Pulivendla	2009 (13th)	20 May 2009	2 September 2009^{[†]}	5 years, 111 days	Indian National Congress	Rajasekhara II
	Konijeti Rosaiah (1933–2021); MLC	2009 (13th)	3 September 2009	24 November 2010^{[RES]}	1 year, 82 days	Indian National Congress	Rosaiah
	N. Kiran Kumar Reddy (born 1959); MLA for Pileru	2009 (13th)	25 November 2010	1 March 2014	3 years, 96 days	Indian National Congress	Kiran
Position vacant (1 March – 7 June 2014); President's rule was imposed during this period (Note: After 58 years, the state was bifurcated into Andhra Pradesh and Telangana states on 2 June 2014 by Andhra Pradesh Reorganisation Act, 2014. After state reorganisation, Andhra Pradesh Sasana sabha seats come down from 294 to 175 seats.)
After reorganisation of Andhra Pradesh (Since 2014)
	N. Chandrababu Naidu (born 1950); MLA for Kuppam	2014 (14th)	8 June 2014^{[§]}	29 May 2019	4 years, 355 days	Telugu Desam Party	Naidu III
	Y. S. Jagan Mohan Reddy (born 1972); MLA for Pulivendla	2019 (15th)	30 May 2019	11 June 2024	5 years, 12 days	YSR Congress Party	Jagan
	N. Chandrababu Naidu (born 1950); MLA for Kuppam	2024 (16th)	12 June 2024^{[§]}	Incumbent	2 years, 157 days	Telugu Desam Party	Naidu IV

== Statistics ==
=== List by chief minister ===
Proportion of Chief Ministers Office held by each party (1953 to present)
1. Indian National Congress (39.1%)
2. Telugu Desam Party (31.8%)
3. Indian National Congress (I) (14.1%)
4. Indian National Congress (R) (7.88%)
5. YSR Congress Party (7.09%)

#	Chief Minister	Party	Term of office	
#	Chief Minister	Party	Longest continuous term	Total duration of chief ministership
1	N. Chandrababu Naidu	TDP	8 years, 255 days	16 years, 36 days
2	Kasu Brahmananda Reddy	INC	7 years, 221 days	7 years, 221 days
3	N. T. Rama Rao	TDP	5 years, 76 days	7 years, 196 days
4	Y. S. Rajasekhara Reddy	INC	5 years, 111 days	
5	Y. S. Jagan Mohan Reddy	YSRCP	5 years, 12 days	
6	Jalagam Vengala Rao	INC(R)	4 years, 86 days	
7	Neelam Sanjiva Reddy	INC	3 years, 71 days	5 years, 51 days
8	N. Kiran Kumar Reddy	INC	3 years, 96 days	
9	Marri Chenna Reddy	INC(I)	2 years, 218 days	3 years, 232 days
10	Kotla Vijaya Bhaskara Reddy	INC(I)	2 years, 64 days	2 years, 175 days
11	Damodaram Sanjeevaiah	INC	2 years, 60 days	
12	N. Janardhana Reddy	INC(I)	1 year, 297 days	
13	Bezawada Gopala Reddy	INC	1 year, 214 days	
14	Tanguturi Anjaiah	INC(I)	1 year, 136 days	
15	P. V. Narasimha Rao	INC(R)	1 year, 102 days	
16	Konijeti Rosaiah	INC	1 year, 82 days	
17	Tanguturi Prakasam	INC	1 year, 45 days	
18	Bhavanam Venkatarami Reddy	INC(I)	208 days	
19	Nadendla Bhaskara Rao	TDP	31 days	

=== List by party ===
#	Party	Number of chief ministers	Total days of holding the office
1	Indian National Congress	15	14644 days (Note: The total tenure includes days held by chief ministers belonging to the Indian National Congress and its splinter parties, the Indian National Congress (Requisitionists) and the Indian National Congress (Indira).)
2	Telugu Desam Party	3	8665 days
3	YSR Congress Party	1	1839 days

=== Timeline ===
Extended content

== Oath as the state chief minister ==
The chief minister serves five years in the office. The following is the oath of the Deputy chief minister of state:

I, <Name of Chief Minister>, do swear in the name of God/solemnly affirm that I will bear true faith and allegiance to the Constitution of India as by law established, that I will uphold the sovereignty and integrity of India, that I will faithfully and conscientiously discharge my duties as a Minister for the State of () and that I will do right to all manner of people in accordance with the Constitution and the law without fear or favour, affection or ill-will.

Oath of Secrecy

"I, [Name], do swear in the name of God / solemnly affirm that I will not directly or indirectly communicate or reveal to any person or persons any matter which shall be brought under my consideration or shall become known to me as a Minister for the State of [Name of State] except as may be required for the due discharge of my duties as such Minister. [Naa Peru] ane nenu, shasanam dvara nirmithamaina Bharatadesha Athmabhandhavya, Sarvabhoumadhikara mariyu Samagrathanu kapadathanu ani... (or: ...Bharata Rajyanganam patla nijanmaina vishwasam, vidheyatha kaligi untanu ani), [Andhra Pradesh / Telangana] Rashtra Mukhya Mantriga naa kartavyalanu shraddha thonu, anthahkarana shuddhi thonu nirvahisthanu ani... Bhayam gani, pakshapatam gani, raagadweshalu gani lekunda... Rajyanganam mariyu shasanalaku luyabadi, prajalandarki nyayam chesthanu ani... Devuni perita pramanam chesthunnanu / Atmasakshiga pramanam chesthunnanu.""[Naa Peru] ane nenu, [Andhra Pradesh / Telangana] Rashtra Mukhya Mantriga naa pariseelana loki vachina, leda naku thilina ey vishayannina... Oka Mukhya Mantriga naa kartavya nirvahanaku avasaramaina sangathullo thappa... prathyakshanga gani, parokshanga gani, ey vyakthiki leda vyakthulaku thelipe prasakthi ledu ani... Devuni perita pramanam chesthunnanu / Atmasakshiga pramanam chesthunnanu."

== See also ==
- History of Andhra Pradesh
- Elections in Andhra Pradesh
- List of governors of Andhra Pradesh
- List of deputy chief ministers of Andhra Pradesh
- List of chief ministers of Telangana
- List of current Indian chief ministers
