= Third N. Chandrababu Naidu ministry =

Andhra Pradesh Council of Ministers headed by N. Chandrababu Naidu (2014–2019)

- 26th Ministry of Andhra Pradesh

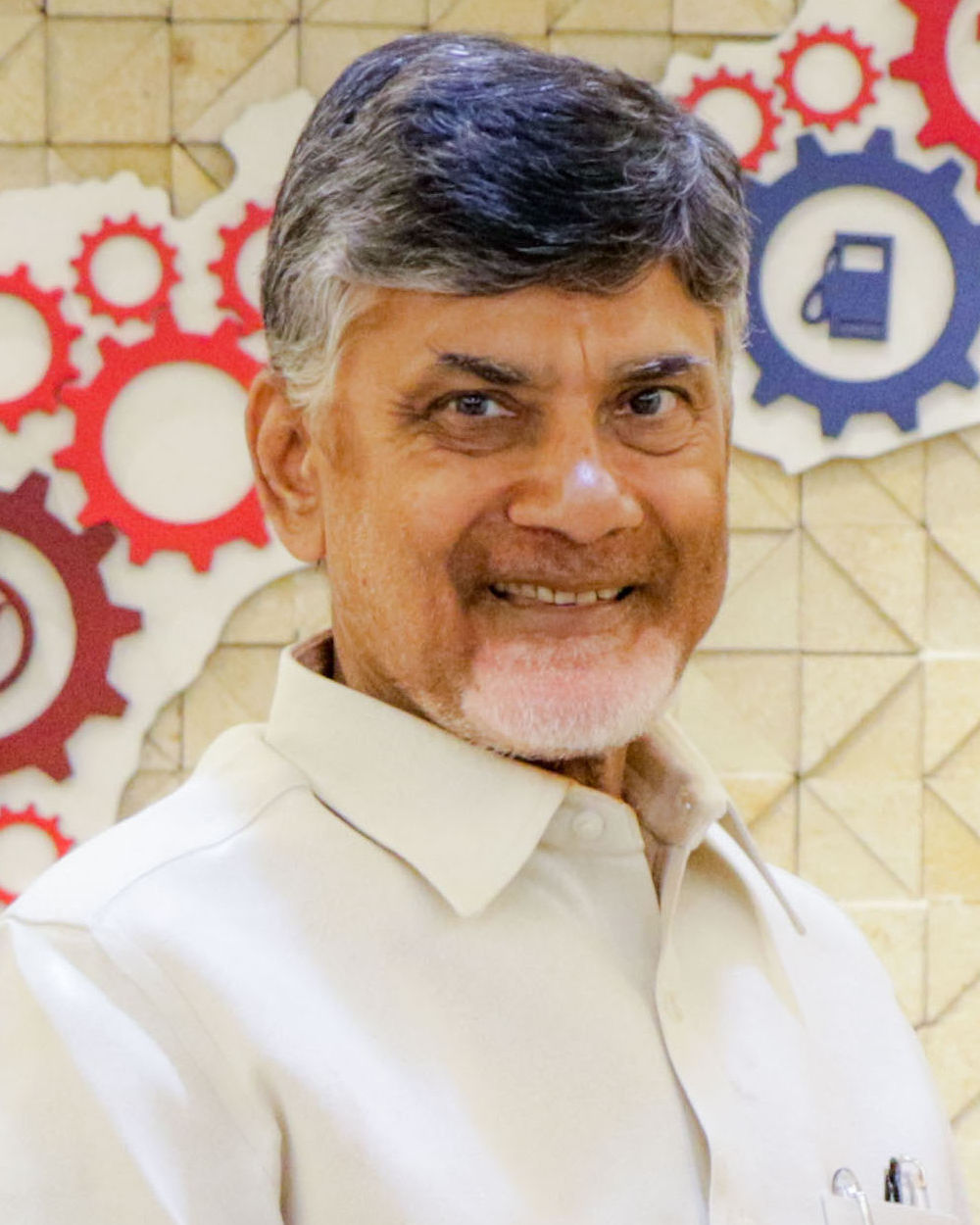
- N. Chandrababu Naidu
- Date formed: 8 June 2014
- Date dissolved: 29 May 2019

People and organisations
- Governor: E. S. L. Narasimhan
- Chief Minister: N. Chandrababu Naidu
- Deputy Chief Minister: K. E. Krishnamurthy; Nimmakayala Chinarajappa
- No. of ministers: 25
- Ministers removed: 8
- Member parties: National Democratic Alliance: Telugu Desam Party; Bharatiya Janata Party
- Status in legislature: Majority
- Opposition party: YSR Congress Party
- Opposition leader: Y. S. Jagan Mohan Reddy (Leader of the opposition)

History
- Election: 2014
- Outgoing election: 2009
- Legislature terms: 6 years (Council); 5 years (Assembly)
- Predecessor: Kiran Kumar Reddy ministry
- Successor: Y. S. Jagan Mohan Reddy ministry

The Third N. Chandrababu Naidu ministry (or also known as 26th ministry of Andhra Pradesh) of the state of Andhra Pradesh was formed on 8 June 2014 headed by N. Chandrababu Naidu as the Chief Minister following the 2014 Andhra Pradesh Legislative Assembly election.

== Background ==
The State Cabinet of Andhra Pradesh was sworn in on 8 June 2014. A total of 26 ministers including N. Chandrababu Naidu took charge as the Chief Minister of Andhra Pradesh.

In 2017 And 2018 cabinet was reshuffled.

== Council of Ministers ==
Key

- ^{RES} Resigned from office

Portfolio	Minister	Constituency	Tenure		Party
Portfolio	Minister	Constituency	Took office	Left office	Party
Chief Minister
General Administration.; Infrastructure & Investment.; Other departments not allocated to any Minister.	N. Chandrababu Naidu	Kuppam	8 June 2014	29 May 2019	TDP
Law & Justice.; Energy.; Industries & Commerce.; Public Enterprises.; Tourism.	N. Chandrababu Naidu	Kuppam	8 June 2014	1 April 2017	TDP
Cinematography.	N. Chandrababu Naidu	Kuppam	8 June 2014	10 November 2018	TDP
Minority Welfare & Empowerment.	N. Chandrababu Naidu	Kuppam	2 April 2017	10 November 2018	TDP
Happiness Index.	N. Chandrababu Naidu	Kuppam	2 April 2017	29 May 2019	TDP
Deputy Chief Ministers
Revenue; Stamps & Registration	K. E. Krishna Murthy	Pattikonda	8 June 2014	29 May 2019	TDP
Endowments	K. E. Krishna Murthy	Pattikonda	25 March 2018	29 May 2019	TDP
Home.; Disaster management.	Nimmakayala Chinarajappa	Peddapuram	8 June 2014	29 May 2019	TDP
Cabinet Ministers
Finance & Planning.; Commercial Taxes.; Legislative Affairs	Yanamala Rama Krishnudu	MLC	8 June 2014	29 May 2019	TDP
Labour & Employment.; Factories.; Youth & Sports.; Skill Development and Entrepreneurship.	Kinjarapu Atchannaidu	Tekkali	8 June 2014	1 April 2017	TDP
Skill Development Corporation.	Kinjarapu Atchannaidu	Tekkali	18 February 2015	1 April 2017	TDP
Transport.; Backward Classes Welfare & Empowerment.; Handlooms and Textiles.	Kinjarapu Atchannaidu	Tekkali	2 April 2017	29 May 2019	TDP
Irrigation.; Command Area Development.	Devineni Uma Maheswara Rao	Mylavaram	8 June 2014	1 April 2017	TDP
Water Resources Management.	Devineni Uma Maheswara Rao	Mylavaram	8 June 2014	29 May 2019	TDP
Panchayat Raj.; Rural Water Supply.; NREGS.	Chintakayala Ayyanna Patrudu	Narsipatnam	8 June 2014	1 April 2017	TDP
Roads and Buildings.	Chintakayala Ayyanna Patrudu	Narsipatnam	2 April 2017	29 May 2019	TDP
Human Resources Development (Primary Education, Secondary Education, Higher & Technical Education)	Ganta Srinivasa Rao	Bheemili	8 June 2014	29 May 2019	TDP
Price Monitoring.; Consumer Affairs.; Food & Civil Supplies.	Paritala Sunitha	Raptadu	8 June 2014	1 April 2017	TDP
SERP.; Women Empowerment.; Child Welfare; Disabled & Senior Citizens Welfare.	Paritala Sunitha	Raptadu	2 April 2017	29 May 2019	TDP
Backward Classes Welfare and Empowerment.; Handlooms.; Excise.	Kollu Ravindra	Machilipatnam	8 June 2014	1 April 2017	TDP
Law & Justice.; Skill development.; Youth.; Sports.; Unemployment Benefits.; NRI Empowerment & Relations	Kollu Ravindra	Machilipatnam	2 April 2017	29 May 2019	TDP
Agriculture.; Agri-Processing.; Marketing & Warehousing.; Animal Husbandry.; Dairy Development & Fisheries.	Prathipati Pulla Rao	Chilakaluripet	8 June 2014	1 April 2017	TDP
Price Monitoring.; Consumer Affairs.; Food & Civil Supplies.	Prathipati Pulla Rao	Chilakaluripet	2 April 2017	29 May 2019	TDP
Transport.; Roads and Buildings.	Sidda Raghava Rao	Darsi	8 June 2014	1 April 2017	TDP
Environment and Forests; Science and Technology	Sidda Raghava Rao	Darsi	2 April 2017	29 May 2019	TDP
Municipal Administration & Urban Development.	Ponguru Narayana	MLC	8 June 2014	29 May 2019	TDP
Urban Water Supply and Urban Planning.	Ponguru Narayana	MLC	8 June 2014	1 April 2017	TDP
Urban Housing	Ponguru Narayana	MLC	2 April 2017	29 May 2019	TDP
Capital Region Development Authority	Ponguru Narayana	MLC	11 November 2018	29 May 2019	TDP
Information & Public Relations.; Information Technology & Communications.; Non-Resident Indian Empowerment and Relations.; Telugu Language & Culture.; Minority Welfare & Empowerment.	Palle Raghunatha Reddy	Puttaparthi	8 June 2014	1 April 2017	TDP
Environment & Forests.; Science & Technology.; Cooperation.	Bojjala Gopala Krishna Reddy	Srikalahasti	8 June 2014	1 April 2017	TDP
Rural Development.; Housing.; Sanitation.	Kimidi Mrunalini	Cheepurupalli	8 June 2014	1 April 2017	TDP
Women Empowerment.; Child Welfare.; Disabled & Senior Citizens Welfare.; Mines & Geology.	Peethala Sujatha	Chintalapudi (SC)	8 June 2014	1 April 2017	TDP
Social Welfare & Empowerment.; Tribal Welfare & Empowerment.	Ravela Kishore Babu	Prathipadu (SC)	8 June 2014	1 April 2017	TDP
Health.; Medical Education.	Kamineni Srinivas	Kaikalur	8 June 2014	8 March 2018 ^{RES}	BJP
Endowments	Pydikondala Manikyala Rao	Tadepalligudem	8 June 2014	8 March 2018 ^{RES}	BJP
Panchayat Raj.; Rural development.; Information Technology and Communications	Nara Lokesh	MLC	2 April 2017	29 May 2019	TDP
Energy	Kimidi Kala Venkata Rao	Etcherla	2 April 2017	29 May 2019	TDP
Labour.; Employment.; Training and Factories.	Pithani Satyanarayana	Achanta	2 April 2017	29 May 2019	TDP
Agriculture.; Horticulture.; Sericulture and Agri-Processing.	Somireddy Chandra Mohan Reddy	MLC	2 April 2017	29 May 2019	TDP
Rural Housing.; Information & Public Relations.	Kalava Srinivasulu	Rayadurg	2 April 2017	29 May 2019	TDP
Excise	Kothapalli Samuel Jawahar	Kovvur (SC)	2 April 2017	29 May 2019	TDP
Social Welfare & Empowerment.	Nakka Ananda Babu	Vemuru (SC)	2 April 2017	29 May 2019	TDP
Tribal Welfare & Empowerment.	Nakka Ananda Babu	Vemuru (SC)	2 April 2017	10 November 2018	TDP
Cinematography.	Nakka Ananda Babu	Vemuru (SC)	11 November 2018	29 May 2019	TDP
Marketing & Warehousing.; Animal Husbandry.; Dairy Development.; Fisheries and Cooperatives.	Ch. Adinarayana Reddy	Jammalamadugu	2 April 2017	29 May 2019	TDP
Tourism.; Telugu language.; Culture.	Bhuma Akhila Priya	Allagadda	2 April 2017	29 May 2019	TDP
Mines & Geology.	R. V. Sujay Krishna Ranga Rao	Bobbili	2 April 2017	29 May 2019	TDP
Industries.; Food Processing.; Agri Business.; Commerce.; Public Enterprises.	N. Amarnath Reddy	Palamaner	2 April 2017	29 May 2019	TDP
Minority Welfare & Empowerment.; Medical Education.; Dr. N. T. R. University of Health Sciences.; Dr. Nandamuri Taraka Rama Rao Vaidya Seva.; Andhra Pradesh Medical Technology Zone.; Andhra Pradesh Medical Services and Infrastructure Development Corporation.	N. Md. Farooq	MLC	11 November 2018	29 May 2019	TDP
Tribal Welfare & Empowerment.; Primary Health & Family Welfare.; Andhra Pradesh Vaidya Vidhana Parishad.; Ayush and Drug Control.	Kidari Sravan Kumar	Provisional (Note: Appointed as minister on terms to be elected as a Member of Legislative Assembly or Member of Legislative Council within another six months)	11 November 2018	9 May 2019 ^{RES}	TDP

== See also ==
- Andhra Pradesh Council of Ministers
- N. Kiran Kumar Reddy ministry
- First K. Chandrashekar Rao ministry
- Fourth N. Chandrababu Naidu ministry
