= Nellore Assembly constituency =

Defunct Legislative Assembly constituency in Andhra Pradesh, India

Nellore
- Former constituency for the Andhra Pradesh Legislative Assembly

Constituency details
- Country: India
- Region: South India
- State: Andhra Pradesh
- District: Nellore
- Lok Sabha constituency: Nellore
- Established: 1951
- Abolished: 2008
- Reservation: None

Nellore Assembly constituency was an assembly constituency of the Madras Legislative Assembly until 1953 and of the Andhra Pradesh Legislative Assembly, India after 1953 until 2008. It was one of constituencies in Nellore district. The constituency was split into Nellore City Assembly constituency and Nellore Rural Assembly constituency as part of the 2008 delimitation.

== Members of the Legislative Assembly ==
Year	Member	Political party
1952	Swarna Vemayya	Independent
1952	Khandavalli Krishna Rao	Independent
1955	Anam Chenchu Subba Reddy	Indian National Congress
1962	Ganga China Kondaiah	Indian National Congress
1967	M. R. Annadata	Bharatiya Jana Sangh
1972	Anam Venkata Reddy	Indian National Congress
1978	Kunam Venkata Subba Reddy	Indian National Congress
1983	Anam Ramanarayana Reddy	Telugu Desam Party
1985	Kunam Venkata Subba Reddy	Indian National Congress
1989	Jakka Kodandarami Reddy	Independent
1994	Thallapaka Ramesh Reddy	Telugu Desam Party
1999	Anam Vivekananda Reddy	Indian National Congress
2004	Anam Vivekananda Reddy	Indian National Congress

== Election results ==
=== 2004 ===
2004 Andhra Pradesh Legislative Assembly election: Nellore
Party	Candidate	Votes	%	±%
INC	Anam Vivekananda Reddy	67,635	58.37%	
BJP	Sannapareddy Suresh Reddy	45,863	39.58%	
Margin of victory		21,772	18.79%	
Turnout		116,059	53.15%	
Registered electors		218,351		
INC hold		Swing		

=== 1999 ===
1999 Andhra Pradesh Legislative Assembly election: Nellore
Party	Candidate	Votes	%	±%
INC	Anam Vivekananda Reddy	51,724	44.73%	
BJP	Narasimha Reddy Dega	46,068	39.84%	
Margin of victory		5,656	4.89%	
Turnout		118,725	50.54%	
Registered electors		234,910		
INC gain from TDP		Swing		

=== 1994 ===
1994 Andhra Pradesh Legislative Assembly election: Nellore
Party	Candidate	Votes	%	±%
TDP	Tallapaka Ramesh Reddy	63,806	51.24%	
INC	P V Prasanna Kumar Reddy	53,824	43.23%	
Margin of victory		9,982	8.02%	
Turnout		125,675	61.71%	
Registered electors		203,645		
TDP gain from Independent		Swing		

=== 1989 ===
1989 Andhra Pradesh Legislative Assembly election: Nellore
Party	Candidate	Votes	%	±%
Independent	Kodandarami Reddy Jakka	56,566	50.28%	
TDP	Tallapaka Ramesh Reddy	42,092	37.42%	
Margin of victory		14,474	12.87%	
Turnout		116,473	64.39%	
Registered electors		180,878		
Independent gain from INC		Swing		

=== 1985 ===
1985 Andhra Pradesh Legislative Assembly election: Nellore
Party	Candidate	Votes	%	±%
INC	Koonam Venkata Subba Reddy	47,074	51.32%	
TDP	Tallapaka Ramesh Reddy	44,086	48.06%	
Margin of victory		2,988	3.26%	
Turnout		92,588	62.24%	
Registered electors		148,757		
INC gain from TDP		Swing		

=== 1983 ===
1983 Andhra Pradesh Legislative Assembly election: Nellore
Party	Candidate	Votes	%	±%
TDP	Anam Ramanarayana Reddy	51,613	60.71%	
INC	Koonam Venkata Subba Reddy	22,068	25.96%	
Margin of victory		29,545	34.75%	
Turnout		87,752	60.89%	
Registered electors		144,122		
TDP gain from INC(I)		Swing		

=== 1978 ===
1978 Andhra Pradesh Legislative Assembly election: Nellore
Party	Candidate	Votes	%	±%
INC(I)	Koonam Venkata Subba Reddy	50,202	67.40%	
JP	Anam Venkata Reddy	18,934	25.42%	
INC	Madala Goplaiah	3,756	5.04%	
Margin of victory		31,268	41.98%	
Turnout		75,631	72.17%	
Registered electors		104,801		
INC(I) gain from INC		Swing		

=== 1972 ===
1972 Andhra Pradesh Legislative Assembly election: Nellore
Party	Candidate	Votes	%	±%
INC	Anam Venkata Reddy	33,359	59.58%	
CPI(M)	Mallapu Arlappa	9,039	16.14%	
ABJS	Madhara Roa Annadatha	7,920	14.14%	
Independent	Abdul Khadar Mohammad	5,228	9.34%	
Margin of victory		24,320	43.43%	
Turnout		57,159	60.92%	
Registered electors		93,827		
INC gain from ABJS		Swing		

=== 1967 ===
1967 Andhra Pradesh Legislative Assembly election: Nellore
Party	Candidate	Votes	%	±%
ABJS	Madhara Roa Annadatha	13,806	29.91%	
CPI(M)	V Nidigallu	11,951	25.89%	
CPI	Ramakotaiah Paruchuru	10,284	22.28%	
INC	R Vennelaganti	10,115	21.91%	
Margin of victory		1,855	4.02%	
Turnout		47,903	65.66%	
Registered electors		72,956		
ABJS gain from INC		Swing		

=== 1962 ===
1962 Andhra Pradesh Legislative Assembly election: Nellore
Party	Candidate	Votes	%	±%
INC	Ganga China Kondaiah	24,344	45.86%	
CPI	Paruchuri Ramakotaiah	23,736	44.71%	
Margin of victory		608	1.15%	
Turnout		54,346	72.99%	
Registered electors		74,453		
INC hold		Swing		

=== 1955 ===
1955 Andhra Pradesh Legislative Assembly election: Nellore
Party	Candidate	Votes	%	±%
INC	Anam Chenchu Subba Reddy	20,657	57.50%	
CPI	Puchalapalli Venktarama Chandra Reddy	12,537	34.90%	
Margin of victory		8,120	22.60%	
Turnout		35,925	56.28%	
Registered electors		63,835		
INC gain from Independent		Swing		

=== 1952 ===
1952 Madras State Legislative Assembly election: Nellore
Party	Candidate	Votes	%	±%
Independent	Khandavalli Krishna Rao	31,705	23.17%	
Independent	Swarna Vemayya	25,468	18.61%	
INC	Anam Chenchu Subba Reddy	23,139	16.91%	
Independent	Ponnaburu Veera Raghava Reddy	22,390	16.37%	
INC	Korabathina Chinaiah	21,550	15.75%	
Independent	Bodda Seshaiah	7,100	5.19%	
Independent	T V Kamala Bai	5,463	3.99%	
Margin of victory				
Turnout				
Registered electors		1,24,488		
Independent win (new seat)				
