= Nellore =

Nellore Nelluru Vikrama Simhapuri
- City
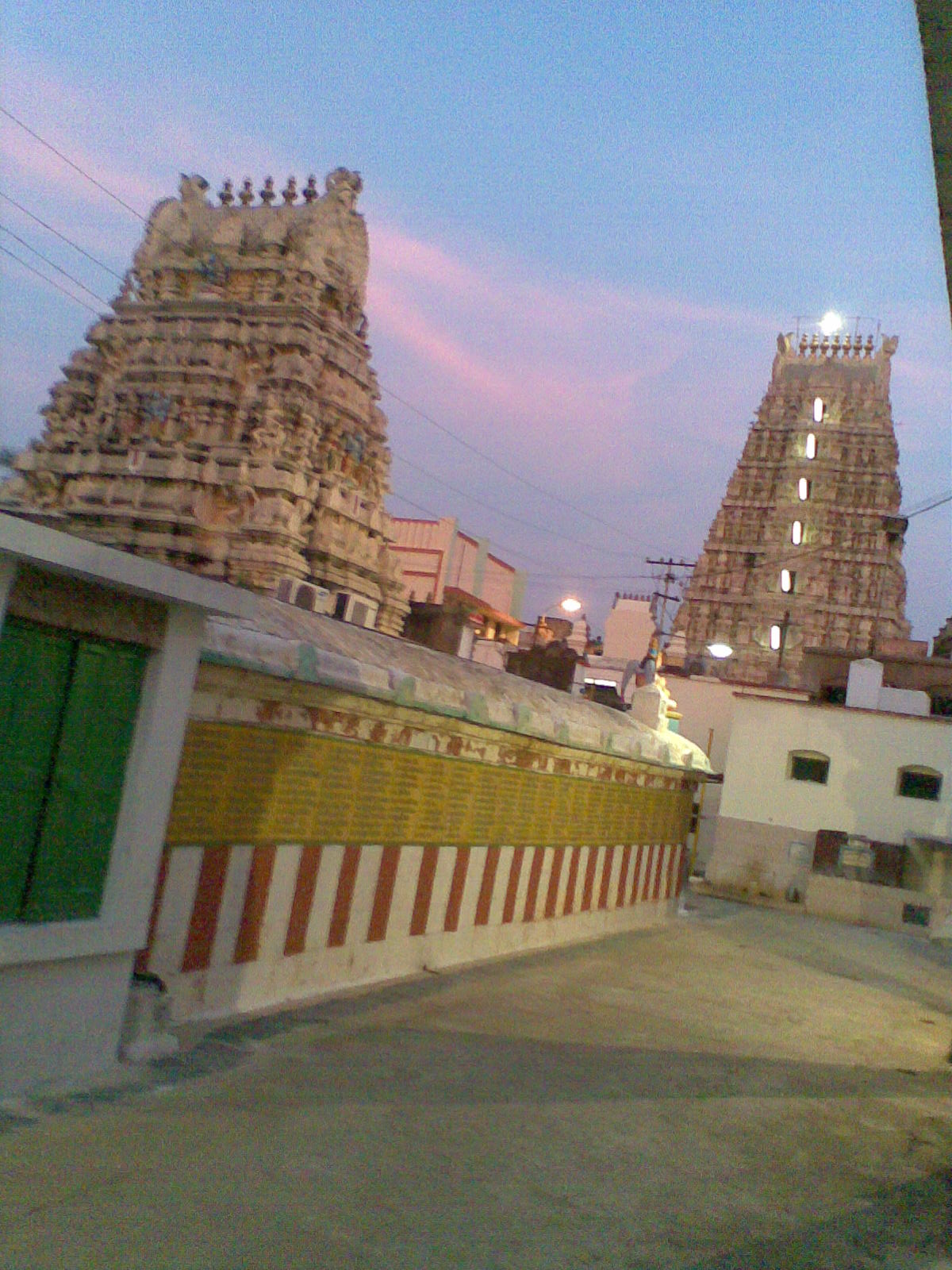
- Gopuram of Sri Talpagiri Ranganadha Swamy Temple, Nellore
- Nickname: Shrimp Capital of India
- Interactive map of Nellore
- Location in Andhra Pradesh, India Nellore (India) Nellore (Asia)
- Coordinates: 14°26′35″N 79°59′10″E
- Country: India
- State: Andhra Pradesh
- District: Nellore
- Region: Coastal Andhra
- Incorporated (Municipality): 1 November 1866
- Incorporated (Corporation): 2004
- Named for: Indian gooseberry

Government
  - Type: Municipal Corporation
  - Body: Nellore Municipal Corporation
  - Mayor: Poluboina Roopkumar Yadav, TDP
  - MLAs: List of MLAs: Ponguru Narayana (Nellore City); Kotamreddy Sridhar Reddy (Nellore Rural)
  - MP: Vemireddy Prabhakar Reddy, TDP

Area
  - City: 149.2 km^{2} (57.6 sq mi)

Population (2011)
  - City: 600,869
  - Rank: 4th (in AP)
  - Density: 4,027/km^{2} (10,430/sq mi)
  - Metro: 600,869
- Demonym: Nellorean

Literacy

Languages
  - Official: Telugu
- Time zone: UTC+5:30 (IST)
- PIN: 524001-524007
- Area code: +91–861
- Vehicle registration: AP-39
- Nominal GDP(2023-24): ₹16,989 crore (US$1.8 billion)
- Climate: As
- Website: nellore.cdma.ap.gov.in

Nellore, also spelt as Nelluru, is a city located on the banks of Penna River, in Nellore district of Andhra Pradesh, India. It serves as the headquarters of the district, as well as Nellore Urban mandal, Nellore Rural mandal and Nellore revenue division. It is the fourth most populous city in the state. It is at a distance of 279 kilometres (173 mi) from Vijayawada, 660 kilometres (410 mi) from Visakhapatnam, 455 kilometres (283 mi) from Hyderabad and about 170 km (110 mi) north of Chennai, Tamil Nadu and also about 380 km (240 mi) east-northeast of Bangalore, Karnataka. It is the administrative headquarters of Nellore District.

== Etymology ==
There are various theories linked to the origin of the name Nellore. According to a story from the Sthala Purana, the name is connected to a sacred lingam in the form of a stone found beneath a Phyllanthus emblica tree, also known as the nelli tree (nelli, meaning 'emblica tree' in Old Tamil and Telugu). The presence of the nelli tree in this story is believed to be one of the etymological roots of the region's name.

Another theory is that the name "Nellore" is derived from the Tamil word "nellu", which means "paddy" or "rice." The region is renowned for its vast rice cultivation, and the name reflects its agricultural heritage and the importance of rice production in the area. Over time, the name "Nelluru" evolved into the modern form "Nellore," used in both Telugu and Tamil-speaking regions.

Historically, the area was known as Vikrama Simhapuri in medieval era. The abundance of paddy fields eventually led to the name being changed to Nellore. The region has long been associated with agriculture, particularly rice cultivation, which continues to play a significant role in its economy today.

== History ==
Nellore had been under the rule of Mauryas, Satavahanas, Cholas, Pallavas, Pandyas, Kharavela of Chedi dynasty, Kakatiyas, Eastern Gangas of Kalinga Empire, Vijayanagara Empire, Arcot Nawabs and other dynasties.

Nellore was ruled by Ashoka of the Mauryan dynasty in the 3rd century BCE. Nellore was conquered by the rulers of the Pallava dynasty and it was under their rule till the 6th century CE, subsequently the Chola rulers ruled Nellore for a long period of time. The Cholas met their decline in the 13th century CE. Tamil inscriptions indicate that it formed part of Chola kingdom till their decline in the thirteenth century CE. It later became a part of Kakatiyas, Vijayanagara Empire, Sultanate of Golconda, Mughal Empire and Arcot Nawab. In 1758 Marathas under the command of Balwant Rao Captured Nellore from Nazibulla. In the 18th century, Nellore was taken over by the British from the Arcot Nawabs and was part of the Madras Presidency of British India.

=== British rule – Madras Presidency ===
The first account was produced by John Boswell in 1873 as collector. This report by the British Includes Climate, agriculture, health statistics as well important taxation information. Social structure including important families of Nellore from the 1800s. These included Venketagiri Raja, kalhastri Rajah, The Chundi Zamindhar, The Mutiyalpad Zamindhar, Sayidapur Zamindhar, Jupalli Zamindhars of Udayagiri, Udayagiri Jaghirediar, the Vazella Zamidhars of Gudur, Zamindhars of Ongole, Turrawar Poligar, Tadeboyina Polighar, The Chettiars Polighar, The Udathawar Polighar, The Gangulawar Poighar and Buchireddypalem Family. These families under the British Raj were responsible for the villages and lands in their possession. The British recognized the importance of Nellore in cultivation as well as important port of Krishnapatam. The city had an important role in the emergence of the Telugu language and the formation of the state of Andhra Pradesh. Potti Sriramulu, who fasted until death for the formation of Andhra Pradesh, hailed from Nellore. On 4 June 2008, the Government of Andhra Pradesh officially renamed Nellore district as Sri Potti Sriramulu Nellore district in honor of Potti Sriramulu’s sacrifice for the formation

== Geography ==
=== Location ===
Nellore is located at 14.44°N 79.98°E. It has an average elevation of 18 metres (59 ft).

=== Climate ===
The climate of Nellore city can be placed under the tropical savanna climate (As, closely bordering Aw) category according to Köppen climate classification which has hot and humid summers and warm winters. April and May are the hottest months and the hot conditions generally last until the end of the June. December, January and February are the coolest months. As the Bay of Bengal is at a distance of 24 kilometres (15 mi) from the city, the sea breeze renders the climate of the city moderate both in winter and in summer. Humidity level in the city is high due to its proximity to the coast. Nellore only receives small amounts of rain from the south-west monsoon. Most rainfall in Nellore occurs between the months of October and December due to the north-east monsoon. This period gives about 60 percent of the city's annual rainfall. Cyclones are common in the city during this period, causing floods.

The maximum temperature is 36 to 46 °C (97 to 115 °F) during summer and the minimum temperature is 23 to 25 °C (73 to 77 °F) during winter. The rainfall ranges from 700 to 1,000 mm (28 to 39 in) through South West and North East Monsoons. Nellore is subject both to droughts and to floods based on the seasons.

Climate data for Nellore (1991–2020, extremes 1901–present)
| Month | Jan | Feb | Mar | Apr | May | Jun | Jul | Aug | Sep | Oct | Nov | Dec | Year |
|---|---|---|---|---|---|---|---|---|---|---|---|---|---|
| Record high °C (°F) | 35.6 (96.1) | 39.4 (102.9) | 43.9 (111.0) | 45.6 (114.1) | 46.7 (116.1) | 46.7 (116.1) | 42.2 (108.0) | 40.6 (105.1) | 41.7 (107.1) | 40.7 (105.3) | 36.9 (98.4) | 35.4 (95.7) | 46.7 (116.1) |
| Mean daily maximum °C (°F) | 30.2 (86.4) | 32.4 (90.3) | 35.3 (95.5) | 37.8 (100.0) | 40.1 (104.2) | 38.2 (100.8) | 36.0 (96.8) | 35.1 (95.2) | 35.0 (95.0) | 33.3 (91.9) | 30.5 (86.9) | 29.5 (85.1) | 34.5 (94.1) |
| Daily mean °C (°F) | 25.5 (77.9) | 27.2 (81.0) | 29.5 (85.1) | 32.0 (89.6) | 33.8 (92.8) | 32.7 (90.9) | 31.3 (88.3) | 30.6 (87.1) | 30.4 (86.7) | 29.1 (84.4) | 27.0 (80.6) | 25.4 (77.7) | 29.5 (85.2) |
| Mean daily minimum °C (°F) | 21.1 (70.0) | 22.2 (72.0) | 24.1 (75.4) | 26.5 (79.7) | 28.7 (83.7) | 28.6 (83.5) | 27.5 (81.5) | 26.9 (80.4) | 26.6 (79.9) | 25.5 (77.9) | 23.6 (74.5) | 21.8 (71.2) | 25.3 (77.5) |
| Record low °C (°F) | 15.0 (59.0) | 16.1 (61.0) | 17.2 (63.0) | 20.2 (68.4) | 20.2 (68.4) | 21.1 (70.0) | 22.2 (72.0) | 21.7 (71.1) | 21.5 (70.7) | 18.9 (66.0) | 16.7 (62.1) | 14.4 (57.9) | 14.4 (57.9) |
| Average rainfall mm (inches) | 19.7 (0.78) | 2.3 (0.09) | 3.5 (0.14) | 8.7 (0.34) | 36.1 (1.42) | 40.5 (1.59) | 84.0 (3.31) | 107.6 (4.24) | 97.1 (3.82) | 268.6 (10.57) | 287.9 (11.33) | 111.4 (4.39) | 1,067.4 (42.02) |
| Average rainy days | 1.1 | 0.2 | 0.2 | 0.5 | 1.1 | 3.6 | 5.8 | 6.5 | 5.6 | 8.5 | 9.0 | 3.7 | 45.8 |
| Average relative humidity (%) (at 17:30 IST) | 65 | 61 | 61 | 62 | 54 | 52 | 54 | 57 | 62 | 70 | 75 | 70 | 62 |
Source 1: India Meteorological Department
Source 2: Tokyo Climate Center (mean temperatures 1991–2020)

Nellore has been ranked 12th best "National Clean Air City" under (Category 2 3-10L Population cities) in India.

== Demographics ==
Religion in Nellore
| Religion | Percent |
| Hinduism | 78.72% |
| Islam | 19.03% |
| Christianity | 1.59% |
| Others | 0.66% |
Others include Sikhs, Buddhist, Jains & Parsis

As of the 2011 (Note: The planned 2021 census of India was delayed due to the Covid pandemic. As general elections are due in April 2024, further postponement has become necessary. It is now envisaged it will commence in late 2024.) census, Nellore city had a population of 505,258. The average literacy rate stands at 83.59% (male 87.53%; female 79.52%) with 387,192 literates, higher than the state average of 73.00%. The expanded city population, post-merger of 15 gram panchayats into Nellore Municipal Corporation stands at 631,791

Historical population
| Year | Population | Growth rate |
|---|---|---|
| 1961 | 106776 | --- |
| 1971 | 133590 | 25.1% |
| 1981 | 237065 | 77.5% |
| 1991 | 316606 | 33.6% |
| 2001 | 404775 | 27.8% |
| 2011 | 558,548 | 35.29% |

== Education ==
The primary and secondary school education is imparted by government, aided, and private schools of the School Education Department of the state. The medium of instruction followed by different schools are English and Telugu.

Vikrama Simhapuri University is located in Nellore City which offers multiple graduation and post graduation courses to students.

Apart from it, the south headquarters of Indian Institute of Tourism and Travel Management (IITTM) is also in Nellore.

== Governance ==
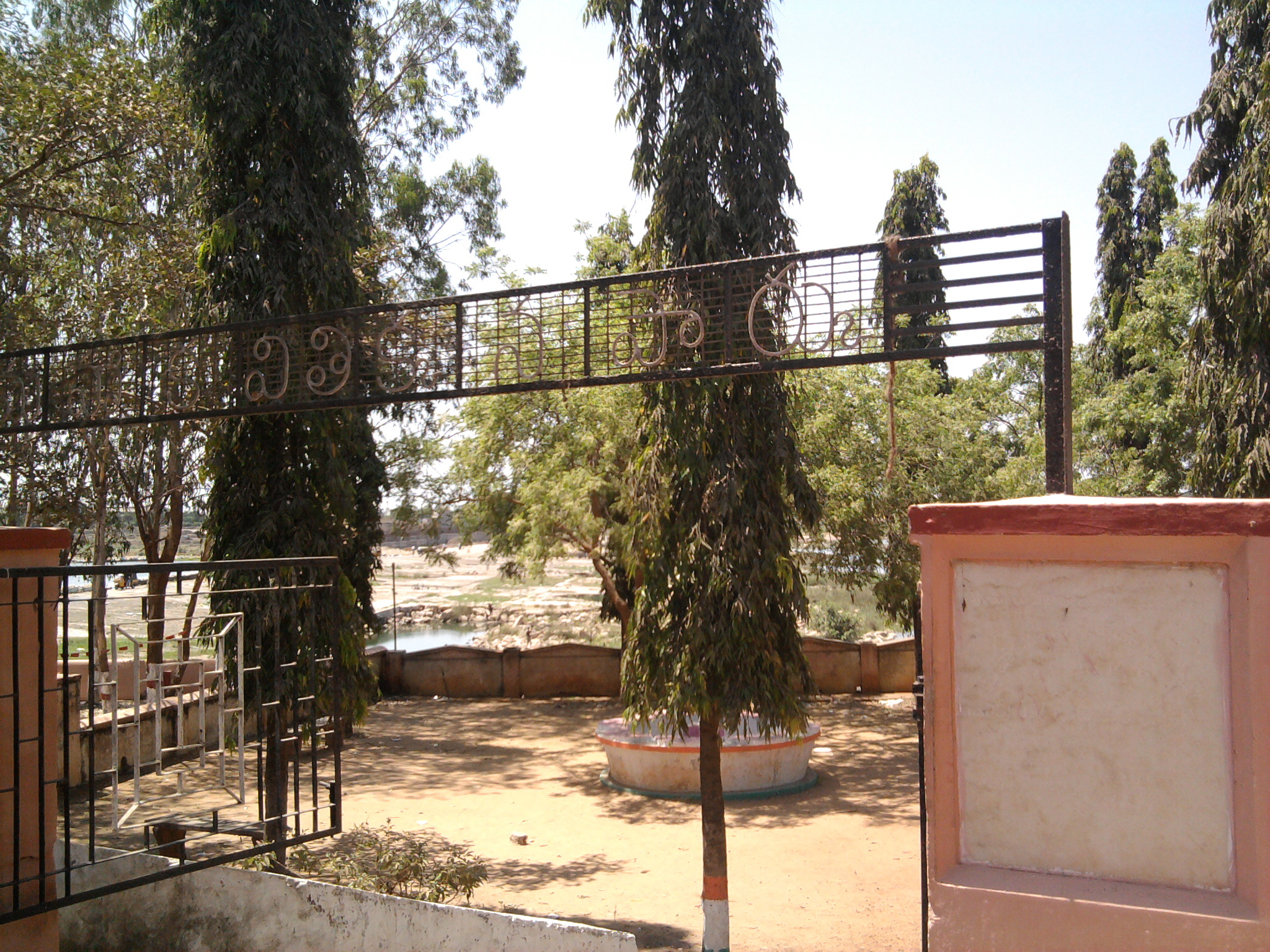
Tikkana Park in Nellore

=== Civic administration ===
Nellore Municipal Corporation was constituted as a municipality on 1 November 1866 by the Madras District Municipality Act. It was upgraded to corporation on 18 October 2004 and has a jurisdictional area of 150.48 km^{2} (58.10 sq mi) with 54 wards. In 2013, fifteen gram panchayats namely, Allipuram, Ambhapuram, Buja Buja Nellore, Chinthareddypalem, Gudupallipadu, Gundlapalem, Kallurupalli, Kanaparthypadu, Kodurupadu, Narayanareddypeta, Navalakulathota, Nellore Bit-I (Kothuru), Peddacherukuru, Pottipalem, Vavilatepadhu were merged into the municipal corporation. Present mayor of the city is Sravanthi.

The city is one among the 31 cities in the state to be a part of water supply and sewerage services mission known as Atal Mission for Rejuvenation and Urban Transformation (AMRUT).

=== Politics ===
Nellore is represented by Nellore City assembly constituency and Nellore Rural assembly constituency for Andhra Pradesh Legislative Assembly. Ponguru Narayana is the present MLA of Nellore City assembly constituency representing Telugu Desam Party. Kotamreddy Sridhar Reddy is the present MLA of Nellore Rural assembly constituency representing Telugu Desam Party.

== Culture ==
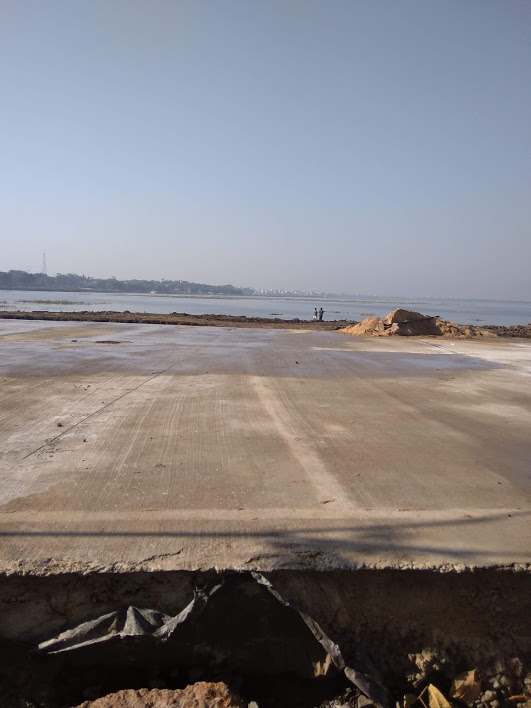
Nellore water tank

The residents of the city are generally referred as Nelloreans. The Rottela Panduga (Roti festival) is an annual urs event celebrated at the Bara Shaheed Dargah (shrine of twelve martyrs) on the banks of Swarnala Cheruvu. The event got its name after the practice of exchanging flat breads and attracts visitors from all religious backgrounds every year and from all over the country and also from foreign countries.

=== Cuisine ===
Chepala Pulusu (fish curry) is a non-vegetarian recipe of the Nellore district, prepared from Korramennu. Malai Kaja Nellore Famous Sweet is a local sweet made from maida, milk and sugar.

== Amenities ==
=== Media ===
Zaminryot newspaper, established in 1930, and the Lawyer Weekly newspaper are based out of Nellore. In addition, Eenadu Vaartha AndhraJyothy and Sakshi newspapers are also printing local editions in Nellore.

=== Transport ===
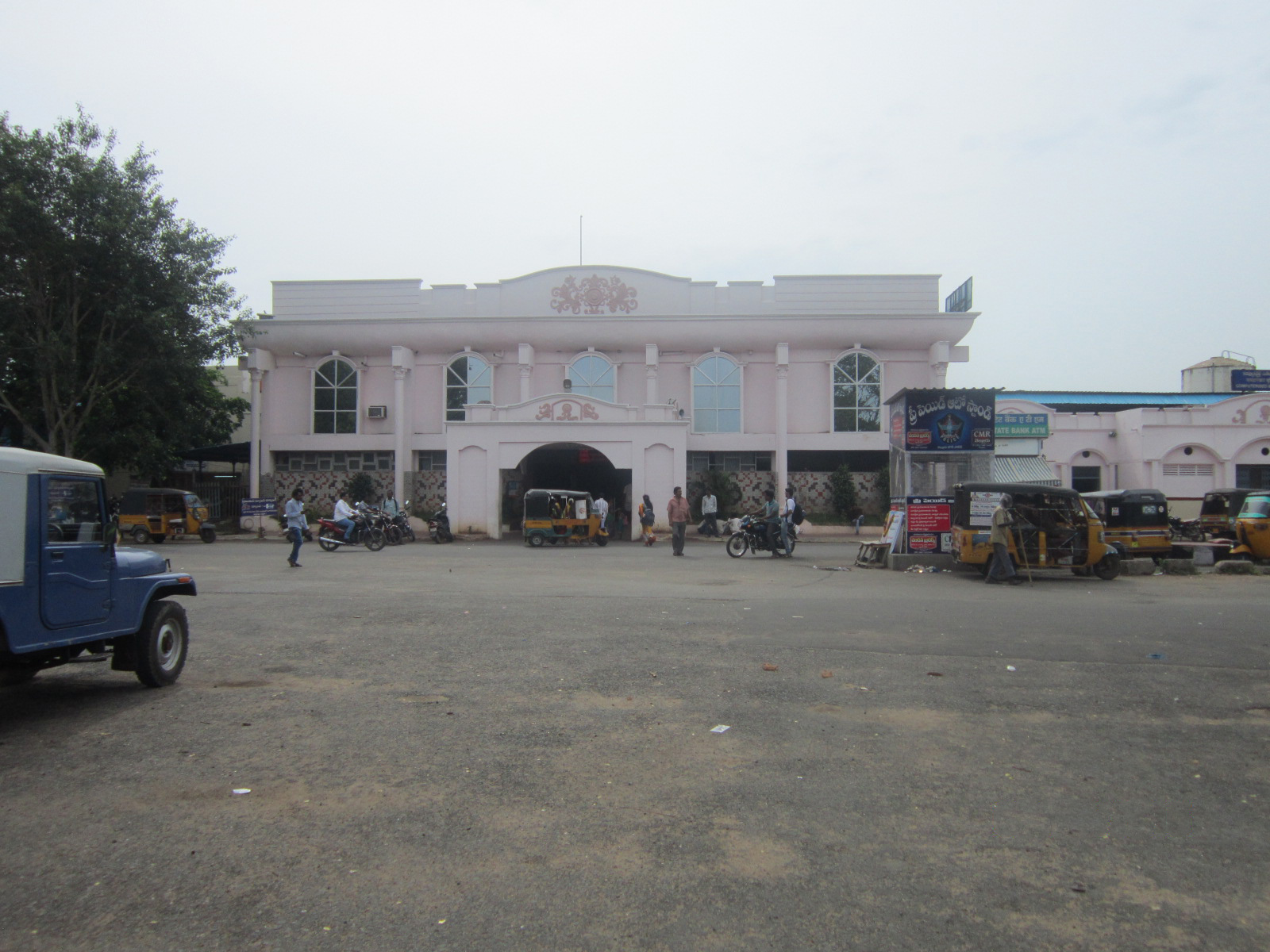
Nellore Railway Station

Local transport in the city include, two, three and four wheelers. Of these, privately operated auto rickshaws numbered around 6,000 in 2017, dominating most parts of the city for local commuting. Nellore bus station of the city operates district and long-distance services. Nellore railway station is classified as an A grade and Adarsh station in the Vijayawada railway division of South Central Railway zone. The city also has three small railway stations namely, Nellore South, Vedayapalem. and Padugupadu railway station The Southern Railway operates MEMUs regularly for commuting between Nellore and Chennai Central. There is also a proposal to build a no frills airport for the city.

The city has a total road length of 1,189.95 km (739.40 mi). The proposed Outer Ring Road, existing arterial and internal roads helps reduce traffic congestion. The city is connected with major National highways such as, National Highway 16, a part of Asian Highway 45 and Golden Quadrilateral, bypasses the city.

== Notable people ==
- Acharya Aatreya, playwright, poet
- S. P. Balasubrahmanyam, playback singer
- Venkatesh Geriti, political activist
- Venkaiah Naidu, Vice President of India
- Kalahasti P. Prasad, electrical engineering researcher and educator
- Rajanala Kaleswara Rao, Telugu actor
- Bezawada Gopala Reddy, Former Chief Minister of United Andhra Pradesh
- Ramana Reddy, Telugu actor/comedian
- Potti Sreeramulu, Indian Freedom Fighter
- Puchalapalli Sundarayya
- Tikkana, poet, one of the "Trinity of Poets"
- Vanisri, actress
- Ashwin Hebbar, Cricketer
- Ponguru Narayana, Politician
- Kotamreddy Sridhar Reddy, Politician
- Poluboina Anil Kumar, Politician

== See also ==
- List of urban agglomerations in Andhra Pradesh
- List of municipal corporations in India#Andhra Pradesh
- List of tourist attractions in Nellore
