= N. Chandrababu Naidu ministry =

N. Chandrababu Naidu ministry may refer to these following cabinets headed by N. Chandrababu Naidu as the chief minister of Andhra Pradesh:

- First N. Chandrababu Naidu ministry (1995–1999)
- Second N. Chandrababu Naidu ministry (1999–2004)
- Third N. Chandrababu Naidu ministry (2014–2019)
- Fourth N. Chandrababu Naidu ministry (2024–)

== See also ==
- Chief ministership of N. Chandrababu Naidu
