= Ministry of Municipal Administration and Urban Development =

Government official of Andhra Pradesh, India

Minister of Municipal Administration and Urban Development
- Purapālaka mariyu Paṭṭaṇābhivṛddhi Śākha Mantrī
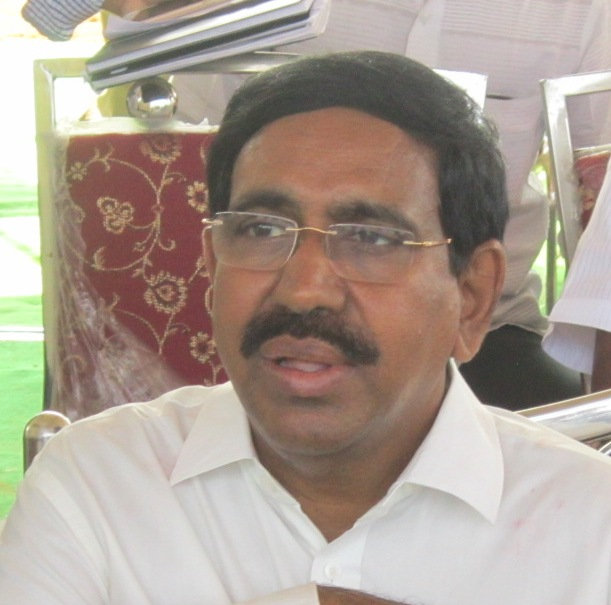
- Incumbent; Ponguru Narayana since 12 June 2024
- Department of Municipal Administration & Urban Development
- Abbreviation: MA&UD
- Member of: Andha Pradesh Cabinet
- Reports to: Governor of Andhra Pradesh; Chief Minister of Andhra Pradesh; Andhra Pradesh Legislature
- Appointer: Governor of Andhra Pradesh on the advice of the chief minister of Andhra Pradesh
- Inaugural holder: Ponguru Narayana
- Formation: 8 June 2014
- Website: Official website

The Minister of Municipal Administration and Urban Development is the head of the Department of Municipal Administration & Urban Development in the Government of Andhra Pradesh. The Minister is one of the senior-most members of the Andhra Pradesh Cabinet.

From June 2014 to May 2019, following the bifurcation of United Andhra Pradesh into the present-day residual Andhra Pradesh and Telangana, the Minister of Municipal Administration & Urban Development was Ponguru Narayana of the Telugu Desam Party. Following the cabinet formation on 12 June 2024, Ponguru Narayana assumed the office under the Chief Ministership of N. Chandrababu Naidu.

== List of ministers ==
#	Portrait	Minister (Lifespan) Constituency	Term of office			Election (Term)	Party	Ministry	Chief Minister	Ref.
#	Portrait	Minister (Lifespan) Constituency	Term start	Term end	Duration	Election (Term)	Party	Ministry	Chief Minister	Ref.
1		Ponguru Narayana (born 1957); MLC	8 June 2014	29 May 2019	4 years, 355 days	2014 (14th)	Telugu Desam Party	Naidu III	N. Chandrababu Naidu	
2		Botsa Satyanarayana (born 1958); MLA for Cheepurupalli	8 June 2019	10 April 2022	2 years, 306 days	2019 (15th)	YSR Congress Party	Jagan	Y. S. Jagan Mohan Reddy	
3		Audimulapu Suresh (born 1964); MLA for Yerragondapalem	11 April 2022	8 June 2024	2 years, 58 days	2019 (15th)	YSR Congress Party	Jagan	Y. S. Jagan Mohan Reddy	
4		Ponguru Narayana (born 1957); MLA for Nellore City	12 June 2024	Incumbent	2 years, 88 days	2024 (16th)	Telugu Desam Party	Naidu IV	N. Chandrababu Naidu	
