= Anam Vivekananda Reddy =

Indian politician

Member of Legislative Assembly Andhra Pradesh
- In office 2009–2014
- Preceded by: Constituency Established
- Succeeded by: Kotamreddy Sridhar Reddy
- Constituency: Nellore Rural
- In office 1999–2009
- Preceded by: Thallapaka Rameshreddy
- Succeeded by: Mungamuru Sridhara Krishna Reddy
- Constituency: Nellore

Personal details
- Born: 23 December 1950 Nellore District, Andhra Pradesh, India
- Died: 25 April 2018 (aged 67) Hyderabad, Telangana, India
- Party: INC till 2015 and TDP
- Spouse: Himavathi Anam
- Children: Anam Chenchu Subba Reddy, Anam Ranga Mayur Reddy
- Website: https://www.facebook.com/viveka.anam

Anam Vivekananda Reddy, better known as Anam Viveka, was an Indian politician from Andhra Pradesh. He was a member of Indian National Congress and joined the Telugu Desam Party in 2016.

== Early life ==
Anam Vivekananda Reddy was born in Nellore to Anam Venkata Reddy. He was the nephew of the late Anam Chenchu Subba Reddy, political leader from Andhra Pradesh during pre and post-Indian independence. He was the brother of Anam Ramanarayana Reddy, who was the minister for Information and Public Relations in the cabinets of Y. S. Rajasekhara Reddy and Konijeti Rosaiah, as well as the minister for finance in the cabinet of N. Kiran Kumar Reddy. Viveka earned a B.A. degree from V.R. College, Nellore.

== Personal life ==
Reddy was married to A. Himavathi from Duvvuru, a Mandal in erstwhile Nellore District and they have two sons, Anam Chenchu Subba Reddy, and Anam Ranga Mayur Reddy who are also active in Nellore politics. Sports and games were Viveka's hobbies and he was fond of children.

== Career ==
Vivekananda Reddy was elected a Member of Legislative Assembly thrice to the AP Assembly. He also served as President of District Land Mortgage Bank, Nellore (1982), Councillor and Vice-Chairman of Nellore Municipality (1982), President of District Central Co- Operative Bank, Nellore, Correspondent and Secretary of S.V.G.S. College, Nellore (1988) and V.R. College, Nellore (1988), Chairman of Sri Venugopala Swmay Temple, Nellore (1994), Municipality of Nellore (1995) and President of Chamber of Municipal Chairman, 1996.

== Political career ==
Having been in politics for many years, Vivekananda Reddy retired in 2014, which allowed his sons to succeed him in politics. The Anam brothers are political rivals of the Mekapati brothers in the Nellore district of Andhra Pradesh. Congress Party MP Mekapati Rajamohan Reddy was and his MLA brother Mekapati Chandra Sekhar Reddy remain strong supporters of YSR Congress Party and Jagan Mohan Reddy. In 2016, the Anam brothers joined the Telugu Desam Party.

== Death ==
Anam Vivekananda Reddy died on 25 April 2018 at KIMS Hospital, Hyderabad after a prolonged illness.
