= Kotamreddy Sridhar Reddy =

Indian politician

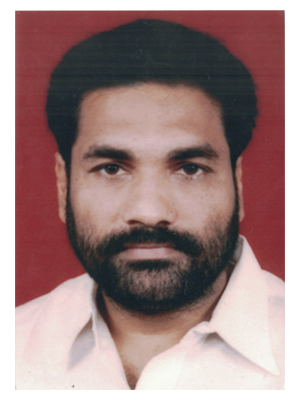

Member of Legislative Assembly Andhra Pradesh
- Incumbent
- Assumed office 16 May 2014
- Preceded by: Anam Vivekananda Reddy
- Constituency: Nellore Rural

Personal details
- Born: 26 September 1965 (age 60)
- Party: Telugu Desam Party (2023–present)
- Other party: YSR Congress Party (2011–2023)
- Spouse: Kotamreddy Sunandamma
- Children: 2 (daughters)
- Parents: Kotamreddy Bapi Reddy (father); Kotamreddy Saralamma (mother)
- Relatives: Kotamreddy Giridhar Reddy (brother)
- Education: B.Com
- Alma mater: Sri Venkateswara University

Kotamreddy Sridhar Reddy (26 September 1965) is an Indian politician from Nellore, Andhra Pradesh. He is a Member of Legislative Assembly of the Indian state of Andhra Pradesh since 2014. He is a three time MLA.

== Early life and education ==
Reddy is from Nellore. His father's name is Kotamreddy Babi Reddy. He married Sujitha and they have two daughters, Lakshmi Haindhavi and Sai Vaishnavi. He is a contractor and his wife is a designer. He completed his graduation in commerce at V. R. College, Nellore.

== Career ==
Reddy started as a student leader and took part in college elections in his degree at V. R. College, Nellore in 1981. In 1985, he became the president of V. R. College. In 1987, he became District Youth General Secretary and went on to become the State Youth General Secretary in 1989.

He became an MLA for the first time in 2014. He won the 2014 Andhra Pradesh Legislative Assembly election from Nellore Rural Assembly constituency representing YSR Congress Party. He defeated Sannapureddy Suresh Reddy of Bharatiya Janata Party by a margin of 25,653 votes. In 2023, he quit YSRCP alleging that his phone was tapped by his own party.

He won the 2024 Andhra Pradesh Legislative Assembly election from Nellore Rural Assembly constituency representing Telugu Desam Party and defeated Adala Prabhakara Reddy of YSR Congress Party by a margin of 34,480 votes.
