= Bara Shaheed Dargah =

Shrine in Nellore, Andhra Pradesh, India

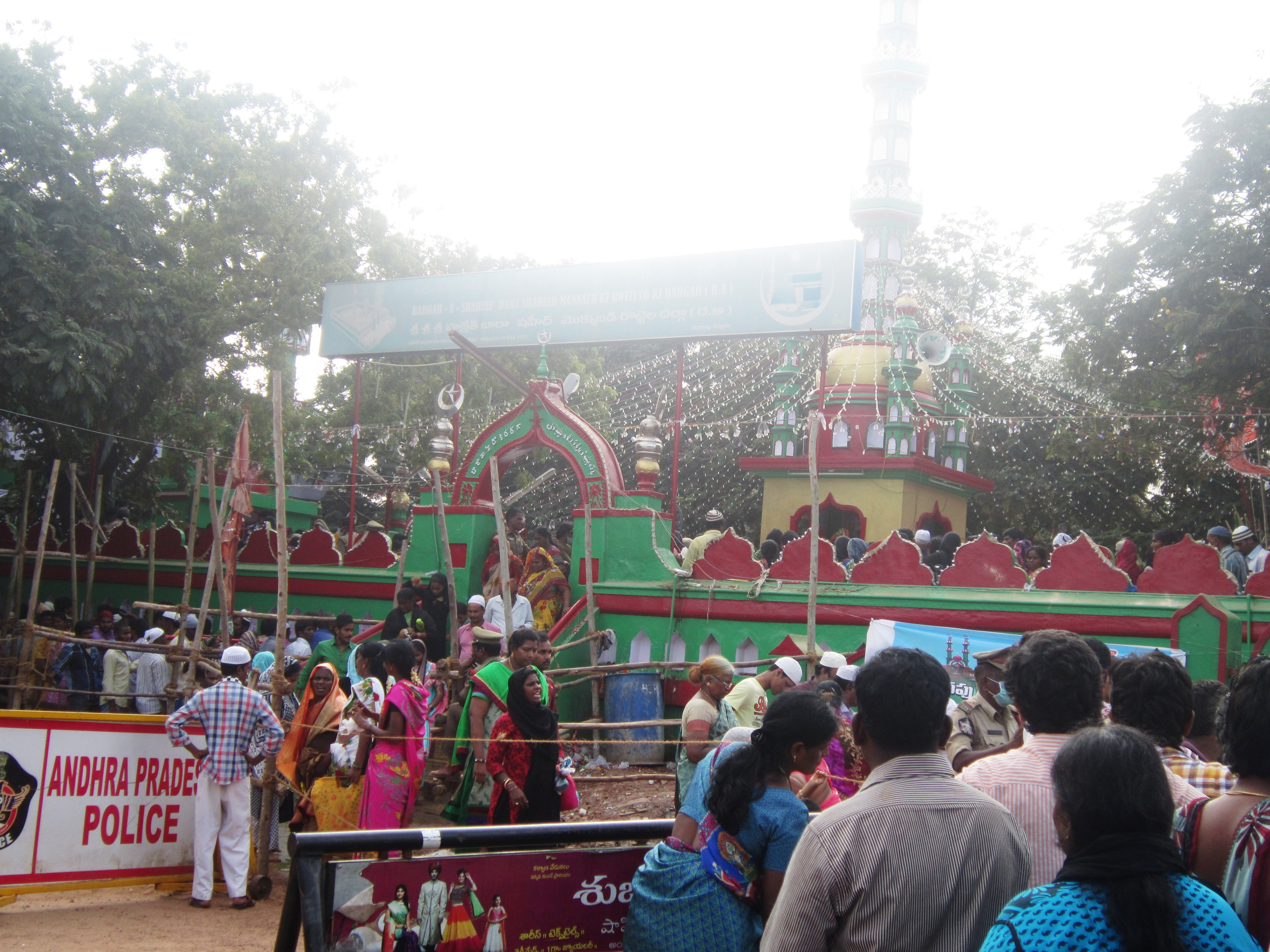
front view of Durgha

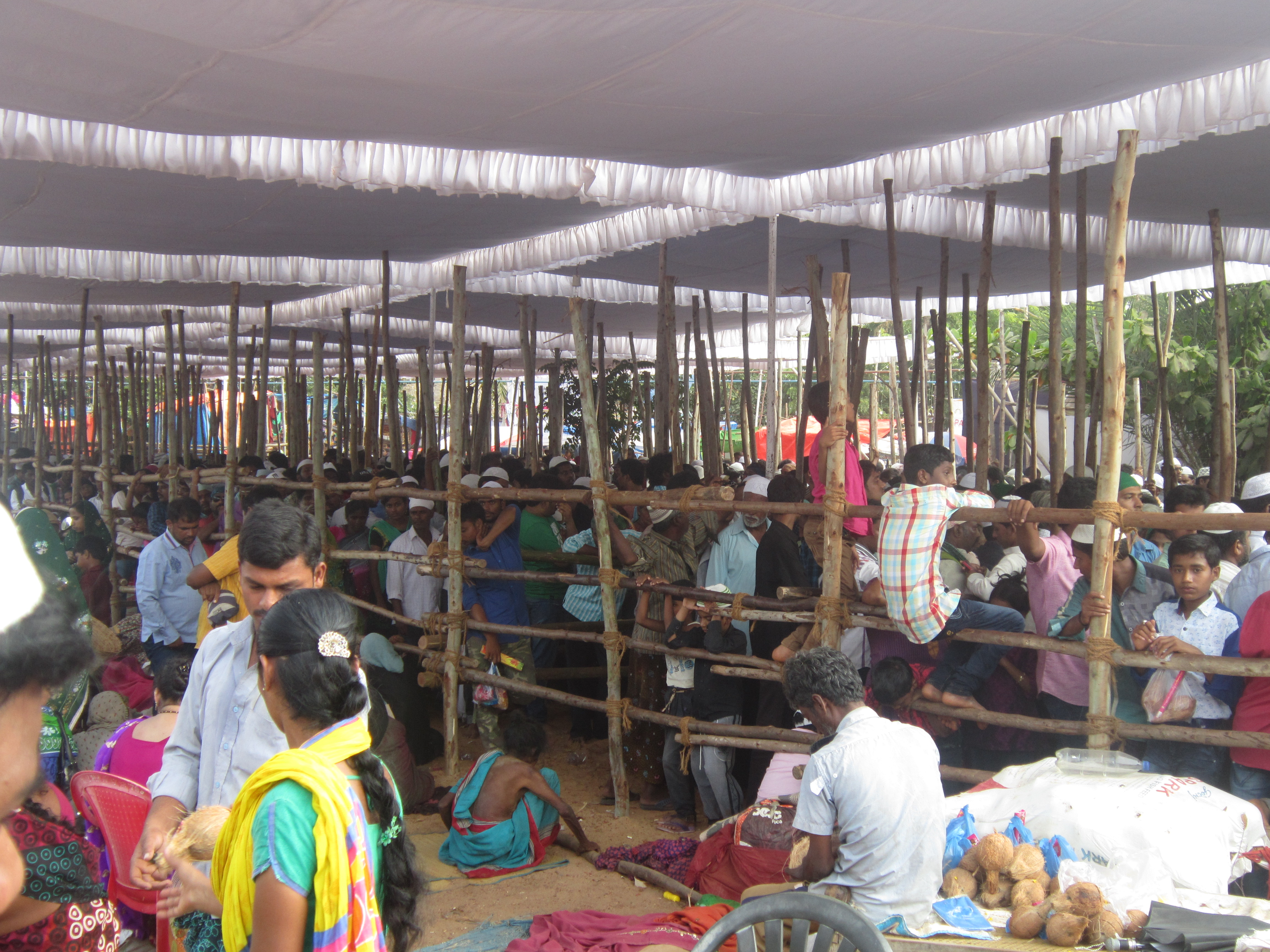
Pilgrims in barracks waiting for ziyarath (darshan) of barasahid tombs

Bara Shaheed Dargah is located in Nellore, Andhra Pradesh, India. "Bara Shaheed Dargah" literally reads "Shrine of twelve martyrs" in Urdu. Dargah is on the bank of the Nellore water tank/lake, and has eid-gah, a tourist resort, and park next to it. It is known for the annual festival of Rotiyaan ki Eid/Rottela Panduga in the month of Muharram in Hijri and attracts followers from across the country and abroad.

== History ==
As per local tradition and according to stone slate in the campus of dargah that reads in Persian, they were twelve tombs of warriors part of first Muslim army to enter into the region and were martyred in the Battle of Karbala

== Rotiyaan ki eid ==
Its one of revered shrines in Nellore District that attracts visitors from across the country and abroad including some celebraties who visit the urs festival. An annual three day urs Rotiyaan ki Eid/Rottela Panduga. is observed in the month of Muharram.

Visitors exchange their roti(flat bread) with those who had similar wish as theirs and was completed(fulfilled), followed by fatihah in dargah. Urs(Festival) has evolved from time to time and can be attributed to Sufism.

== Eid Gah ==
Dargah also hold eid gah in its compound, site for Eid prayers(congregational prayers) on Eid ul fitr(Ramzan) and Eid al-Adha(Bakrid) and being the biggest eid gah in the city.
