= Narayana Educational Institutions =

Educational conglomerate in India

- Formation: 1979; 47 years ago
- Founder: Ponguru Narayana
- Type: Educational institution
- Purpose: Sramayeva Jayate (philosophy); Your Dreams Are Our Dreams (belief); Determination, Progress and Service (vision)
- Headquarters: Hyderabad
- Region served: India
- Directors and Presidents: Ponguru Sindhura, Ponguru Sharani and Puneet Kothapa
- Website: www.narayanagroup.com, www.narayanaschools.in

Narayana Educational Institutions is one of Asia's largest educational conglomerates, with a vast network of 900+ schools, junior colleges, coaching centers and professional institutions across 250+ cities in 23 states of India. Founded by Ponguru Narayana, a prominent educationist turned politician currently serving as a cabinet minister in Andhra Pradesh, the group has played a significant role in shaping the educational scenario of India.

== History ==
In 1979, the founder began a coaching centre in Nellore with a modest enrolment of just seven students. The goal was to provide education with a special emphasis on preparing students for competitive exams such as the Joint Entrance Examination (JEE), National Eligibility cum Entrance Test (NEET) and the Union Public Service Commission Civil Services Examination (UPSC CSE).

Over the subsequent decades, the institution expanded beyond its early regional presence, establishing schools, junior colleges and coaching centres across multiple states in India. By the 2000s and 2010s, Narayana Educational Institutions had developed operations across hundreds of locations in numerous Indian cities and states, reflecting its transition from a local coaching centre into a large multi-state educational organisation.
