= List of tourist attractions in Nellore =

Nellore is a city in the Nellore district of the Indian state of Andhra Pradesh. It is located on the banks of the Penna River in Nellore mandal of Nellore revenue division. The city is the fourth most populous settlement of the state well known for its agriculture and aquaculture. The Andhra Pradesh Tourism Development Corporation is the state tourism department, responsible for maintaining, promoting and developing the tourism sector. Nellore is famous for scenic beaches, historic forts, temples, dargahs, bird and wildlife sanctuaries.

== Government Initiatives ==
=== Photo Contest ===
Photo Contest is an initiative by Andhra Pradesh Tourism Department which is open for all natives of Andhra Pradesh and Tourists to the State, for participation, to encourage the tourism. Participants can send their original photographs which relate to Heritage, Scenic, Religious, Cultural, Wildlife or any other Tourism sector in Andhra Pradesh. These photographs are used on the website of Andhra Pradesh Tourism Department to promote Tourism. Participants are encouraged to submit, by providing prizes every month.

== Tourist Attractions ==
There are a number of temples and dargahs located in Nellore.

- Golagamudi Temple
- Jain Temple
- Jonnawada Temple
- Kasmur Dargah
- Narasimhakonda Temple Vedagiri Lakshminarasimha Swamy devasthanam came into being nearly 500 years ago, on the summit of Narasimhakonda. According to the rock inscriptions, this temple was built by the Pallava king Narsimha Varma, in the ninth century. Legend goes that the sage Kasyapa established the temple on the southern bank of Pinakini. This holy place lies 15 km away from Nellore.
- Penchalakona Temple
- Rahamatulla Durgah This big Dargah here is ancient and is known as Khaja Rahamatulla Dargah. It is one of the unique places where Hindus and Muslims blend together and stand as an illustration of national integrity. Devotees from different parts of the country come to this place. The ornamental work of the dome is worth seeing. Every year Urusu is celebrated when large number of devotees gather here for blessings.
- Sri Mulasthaneswara Temple
- Sri Ranganayaka Swamy Temple
- Sri Venugopla Swamy Temple
- Sullurupet Temples
- Talpagiri Temple
- Tikkana Somayaji park
- Tikkana Somayaji Home (Patur Village, Kovur Mandal)

== Wildlife Sanctuaries ==
- Nelapattu Bird Sanctuary
- Pulicat Wildlife Sanctuary
- Sri Narasimhaswamy Wildlife

== Beaches and Landmarks ==
- Sriharikota Sriharikota is a spindle-shaped island and a forest like area, situated in-between Pulicat Lake and Bay of Bengal. Under the stewardship of Dr. Vikram Sarabhai of the Indian Space Research Organization a rocket launching space centre was established at Sriharikota in 1968. Space Rocket Launching events take place here. Features like a good launch azimuth corridor for various missions, nearness to the equator (benefiting eastward launches), and large uninhabited area for a safety zone make it an ideal spaceport.
- Udayagiri Fort
- Kandaleru Dam
- Krishnapatnam Beach
- Mypadu Beach
