= Ponguru Narayana =

Indian educationist and politician (born 1957)

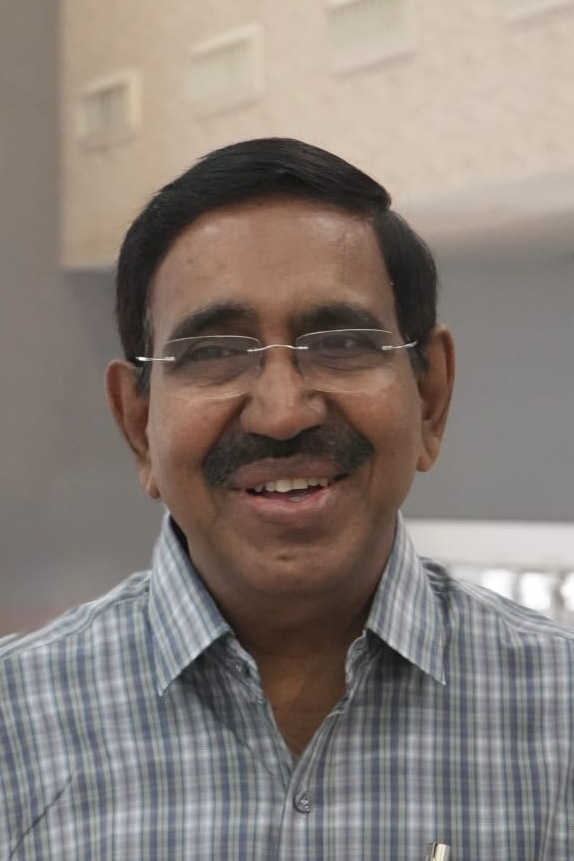
- Narayana in 2025

Minister of Municipal Administration and Urban Development, Government of Andhra Pradesh
- Incumbent
- Assumed office 12 June 2024
- Governor: S. Abdul Nazeer
- Chief Minister: N. Chandrababu Naidu
- Preceded by: Audimulapu Suresh
- In office 8 Jun 2014 – 29 May 2019
- Governor: E. S. L. Narasimhan
- Chief Minister: N. Chandrababu Naidu
- Preceded by: President's Rule
- Succeeded by: Botsa Satyanarayana

Member of Legislative Assembly, Andhra Pradesh
- Incumbent
- Assumed office 4 June 2024
- Preceded by: Anil Kumar Poluboina
- Constituency: Nellore City

Member of Legislative Council, Andhra Pradesh
- In office 14 August 2014 – 29 March 2019
- Preceded by: Kolagatla Veerabhadra Swamy
- Constituency: Elected by MLAs

Personal details
- Born: 15 June 1957 (age 69) Nellore, Andhra Pradesh, India
- Party: Telugu Desam Party
- Spouse: Ponguru Ramadevi
- Children: 2 daughters and 1 son

Ponguru Narayana (born 15 June 1957) is an Indian educationist turned politician in the state of Andhra Pradesh, India. He was elected to the Andhra Pradesh Legislative Council under Telugu Desam Party, in 2014 and served as the Minister for Municipal administration and Urban development & Urban Housing.. He established the Narayana Group of Educational Institutions.

== Early life and education ==
Narayana was born on 15 June 1957, into a Telugu-speaking family in Harnathapuram, Nellore district, Andhra Pradesh, India. His parents were Ponguru Subbaramayya and Subamma, and he belonged to the Kapu community. Dr Narayana studied B.A. in mathematics and statistics from V. R. College at Nellore in 1977 and subsequently earned his MSc. (1979) and PhD (2002) in statistics from Sri Venkateswara University and worked as a senior lecturer. He is married to Ramadevi with whom he has three children, his son died in a car accident in Hyderabad, Telangana.

== Electoral history ==
Election results
Year	Office	Constituency	Party	Votes	%	Opponent	Party	Votes	%	Result	Ref
2019	MLA	Nellore City	Telugu Desam Party	71,052	46.13	Poluboina Anil Kumar	YSR Congress Party	74,040	47.38	Lost	
2024	MLA	Nellore City	Telugu Desam Party	120,551	68.99	Mohammad Khaleel Ahamad	YSR Congress Party	48,062	27.51	Won	
