= Rottela Panduga =

Annual three-day festival in Andhra Pradesh, India

Rotiyaan Ki Eid / Rottela Panduga
- Duration: 3 days
- Frequency: Annual
- Related to: Islam (Sufism/Barelvi)

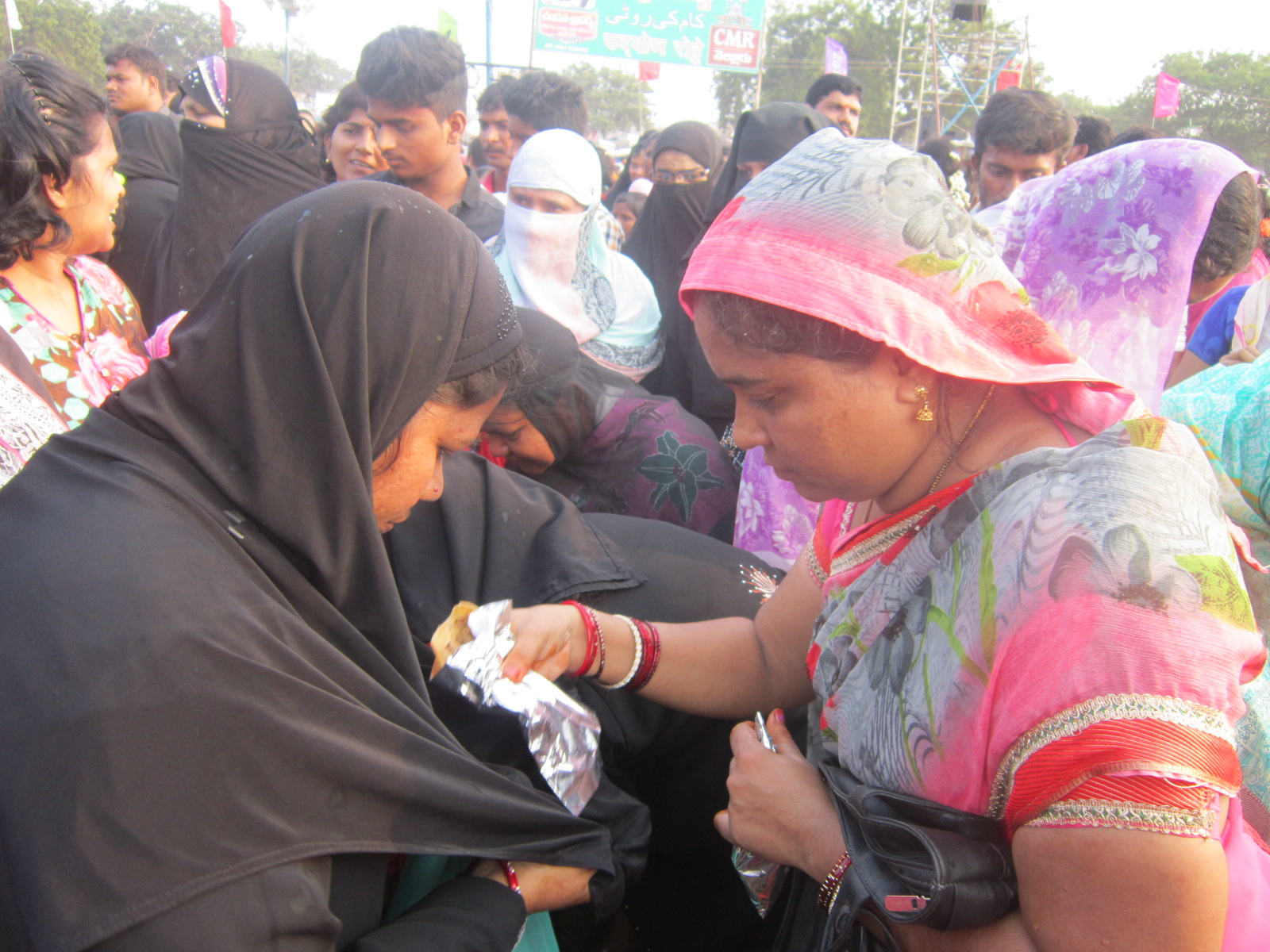
Hindu-Muslim women Pilgrims exchanging Rotis, at svarana Tank, Nellore

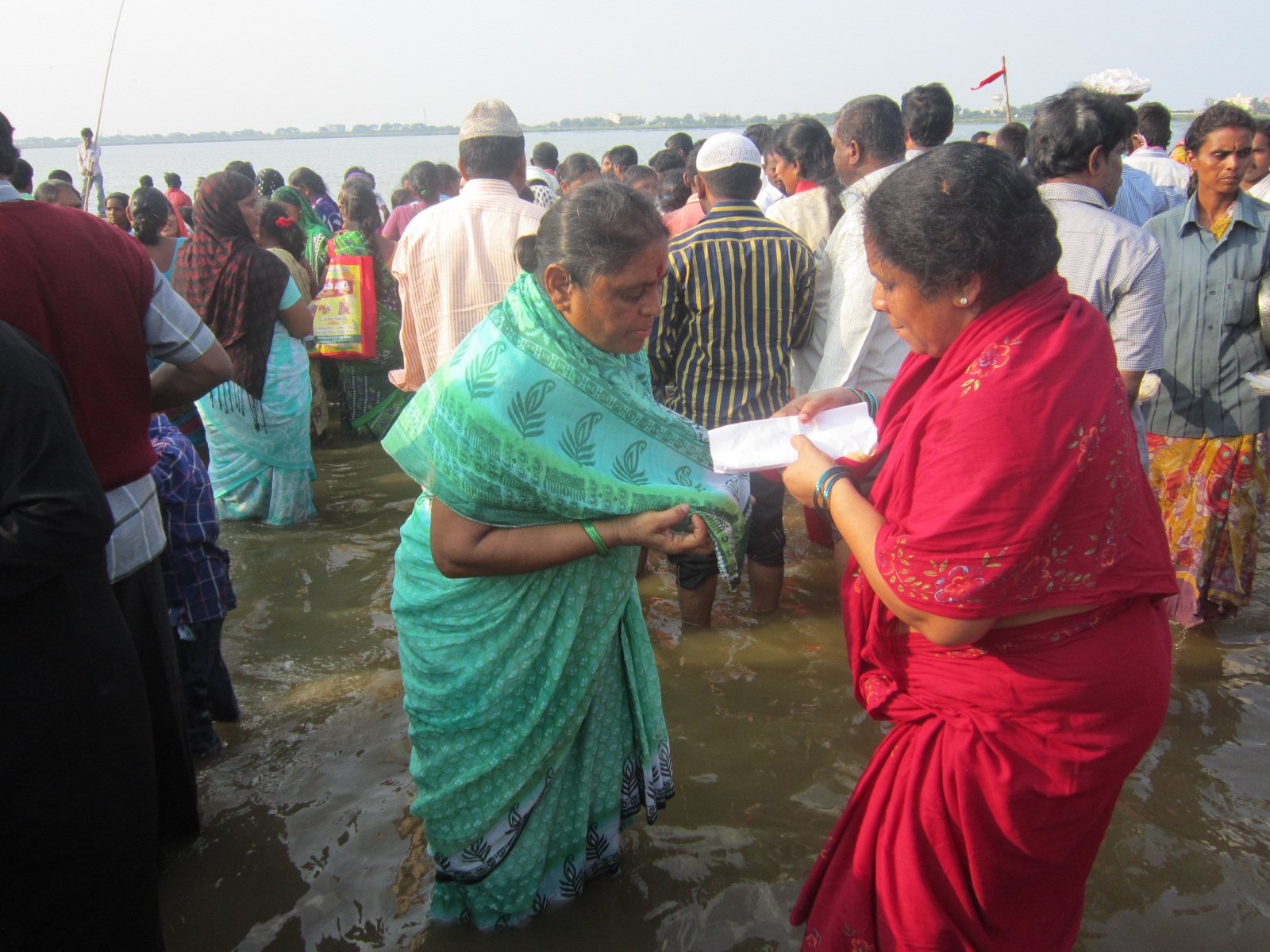
Women Pilgrims exchanging Rotis, at svarana Tank, Nellore

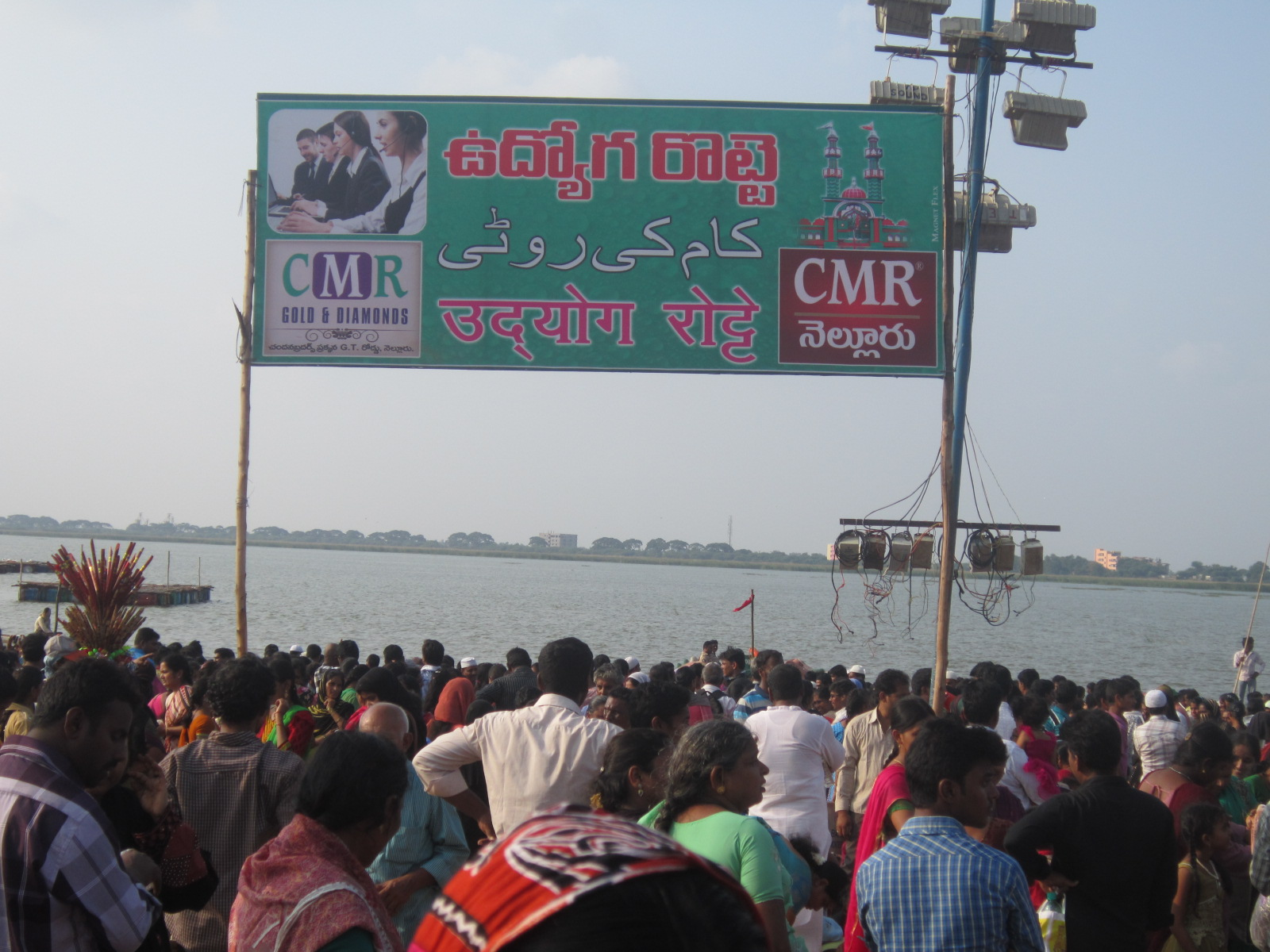
Job Roti exchanging place at svarana Tank, Nellore

Rotiyaan Ki Eid or Rottela Panduga is an annual three-day festival held at Bara Shaheed Dargah in Nellore, Andhra Pradesh, India. The annual event is observed in the month of Muharram as the urs (death anniversary) of the 12 martyrs who are buried in the shrine. Women who visit the shrine exchange rotis in Nellore Tank.
