= Kalahasti P. Prasad =

Indian electrical engineer, researcher and educator (1944 - 2010)

Alexander von Humboldt Fellow, German Academic Exchange Service
- In office 1981–1994

Head of Engineering College Sri Venkateswara University, Member AICTE, Member UGC
- In office 1995–2004

Kalahasti Parvatheeswara Prasad (15 June 1944 – 5 April 2010) was a researcher and educator in Electrical Engineering in the Andhra Pradesh state of India.

== Biography ==
He was born at Nellore of Nellore district at a time when this was still part of Madras Presidency to Kalahasti Ramanathan Sastrulu (1909–2003) and Kalahasti Gnanamba (1919–1989). He moved to Visakhapatnam to get B.E. and M.E. degrees in Electrical Engineering from Andhra University in 1968. He went on to get a Ph.D. degree in Electrical Engineering with a specialization in digital signal processing from Indian Institute of Technology Madras in 1974. His work included creating and implementing new DSP algorithms in FORTRAN and Pascal (programming language) languages on the DEC PDP-11 as well as the IBM System/360 platforms.

== Career ==
In 1975, Prasad was invited to work as a Post-doctoral Research Fellow by Concordia University. He spent five years there. His primary research output was in digital signal processing algorithms and Complex Analysis techniques. Subsequently, he was selected as an Alexander von Humboldt Fellow working at the University of Erlangen-Nuremberg in 1981 where he remained for the next five years returning to India in 1985. While he was at University of Erlangen-Nuremberg, he published two textbooks, one on digital signal processing algorithms implementation in FORTRAN and another textbook on Fast Fourier transform algorithms. He revisited University of Erlangen-Nuremberg as an Alexander von Humboldt Fellow between 1990 and 1992. Meanwhile, he spent a few years organizing the Electrical Engineering department at Sri Venkateswara University between 1986 and 1990. He was also a continuous recipient of German Academic Exchange Service (DAAD) Scholarship grants for research in Digital and Statistical Signal Processing areas between 1981 and 1994.

Prasad published about 150 technical research papers among which at least 75 papers were published in international journals like IEEE Communications Magazine and Institution of Engineering and Technology journal while the rest were published in Indian journals. He was also associated with Institution of Electronics and Telecommunication Engineers local Indian chapter at Sri Venkateswara University. He helped organize their annual technical meetings, conferences and symposia while remaining the Head of Electrical and Communications departments in the Engineering College from 1995 until he retired in 2004.

He also served as an editor of IEEE Communications Magazine for a few journal editions in the 90s. He also served as a member of AICTE as well as an honorary member of UGC from 1994 till 2004. His accreditation approval and verification processes helped to launch and grow at least three local Engineering Colleges in the Tirupati and Warangal regions of Andhra province in the 90s and 2000s including Sree Vidyanikethan Engineering College at Tirupati, Kakatiya Institute of Technology and Science at Warangal and K.M.M. Institute of Technology and Sciences (KMMITS) at Tirupati.

After retirement, he served as a Managing Director of KMM Institute of Technology and Sciences (KMMITS) at Tirupati from 2005 till 2010. He simultaneously worked as a consulting Professor in the ECE department affiliated with Sree Vidyanikethan Engineering College at Tirupati.

Kalahasti Parvatheeswara Prasad died on 5 April 2010 due to a stroke.

== Positions held ==
- Head of Engineering College, Sri Venkateswara University, Tirupati
- First Principal, K.M.M. Institute of Technology and Sciences, Tirupati
- AICTE Accrediting Program Director, 1995–2004
- UGC Grants Program Director, 1995–2004
- Senior Editor and Senior Member, Institute of Electrical and Electronics Engineers Communications
- Director, Tirupati Chapter, Institution of Electronics and Telecommunication Engineers

== Achievements ==
- Alexander von Humboldt Fellow
- German Academic Exchange Service (DAAD) Scholar
