= Sri Talpagiri Ranganadha Swamy Temple, Nellore =

Hindu temple in Andhra Pradesh, India

Sri Ranganathaswamy Temple
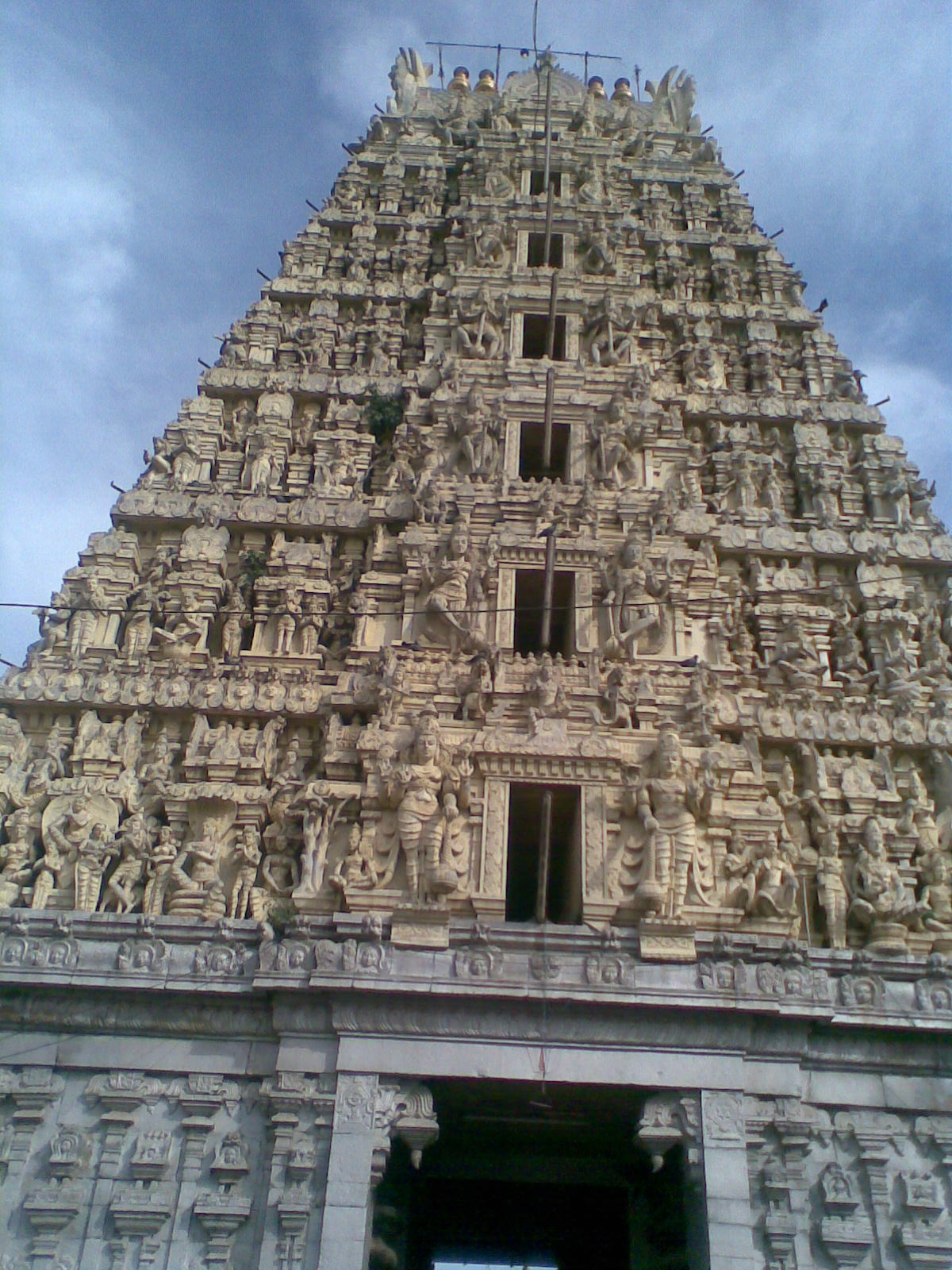

- Location in Andhra Pradesh

Religion
- Affiliation: Hinduism
- District: Nellore
- Deity: Vishnu

Location
- Location: Nellore
- State: Andhra Pradesh
- Country: India
- Interactive map of Sri Ranganathaswamy Temple
- Coordinates: 14.878847°N 79.297857°E

Architecture
- Completed: 200 A.D.

The Sri Ranganthaswami Temple in Nellore, Andhra Pradesh, India is a Hindu temple dedicated to Lord Ranganatha a resting form of Lord Vishnu. This temple, also called Talpagiri Ranganathaswami temple or Ranganayakulu is one of the oldest temples in Nellore. It is located on the banks of the Penna River and is believed to have been constructed in the 12th century. Just before the main entrance of the temple is a huge tower, called Gaaligopuram, which literally means "wind tower". This tower is approximately 70 feet high and has 10 feet of gold plated vessels on top of it, called kalashams. The gopuram was constructed by Yeragudipati Venkatachalam panthulu. Every year during the month of March–April (which varies according to the Indian calendar) a grand festival is celebrated. These are called Brahmotsavam.
