= Chief ministership of N. Chandrababu Naidu =

Chandrababu Naidu's Chief ministership

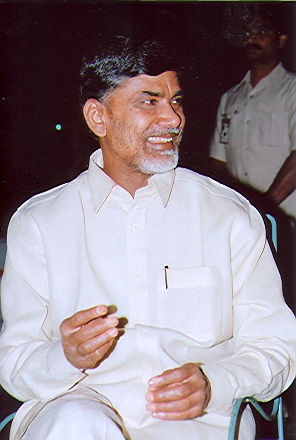
- Naidu in 2007
- Chief ministership of N. Chandrababu Naidu
- Premier: N. Chandrababu Naidu
- Party: Telugu Desam Party
- First term 1 September 1995 – 11 October 1999
- Cabinet: First
- Election: 1995 coup
- Appointed by: Governor, Krishan Kant
- Seat: Kuppam
- Second term 11 October 1999 – 13 May 2004
- Cabinet: Second
- Election: 1999
- Appointed by: Governor, C. Rangarajan
- Seat: Kuppam
- Third term 8 June 2014 – 29 May 2019
- Cabinet: Third
- Election: 2014
- Appointed by: List of governors of Andhra Pradesh, E. S. L. Narasimhan
- Seat: Kuppam
- Fourth term 12 June 2024 – present
- Cabinet: Fourth
- Election: 2024
- Appointed by: Governor, Syed Abdul Nazeer
- Seat: Kuppam

The chief ministership of N. Chandrababu Naidu began on 1 September 1995 and ended on 11 October 1999, making him the 13th Chief Minister of Andhra Pradesh. Naidu was sworn in by the then governor, Krishan Kant. Naidu's second term started on 11 October 1999 to end on 13 May 2004, sworn in by the then governor, C. Rangarajan. After a decade, Naidu's third term commenced on 8 June 2014 and ended on 29 May 2019, during which he served as the chief minister of the bifurcated Andhra Pradesh, sworn in by the then governor, E. S. L. Narasimhan. He is currently serving his fourth term as the chief minister, sworn in by the current governor, Syed Abdul Nazeer on 12 June 2024.

The chief ministership of Naidu during the three terms focused on the Information-technology, innovation and bio-technology sectors paving way to economic reforms and liberalisation rather than welfare oriented governance along with slightest focus on agriculture and irrigation emphasizing the integration of technology and agriculture in the state of Andhra Pradesh.

== Government formation ==
On 1 September 1995, Naidu took over as Chief Minister, and stayed the chief of Telugu Desam Party after a political coup against his father in law N. T. Rama Rao. He formed his first government with a 11-member cabinet along with the support of nearly 150 MLAs'. Later in the year 1999 Naidu the formed the government again by sweeping the polls with 180 seats in the Andhra Pradesh Legislative Assembly. A 9-member cabinet was initially constituted and later expanded it 35 by inducting another 26 ministers into the cabinet. In the subsequent 2004 and 2009 elections, Naidu's led TDP lost decisively restricting itself to 47 and 92 seats respectively and served as the opposition in the Andhra Pradesh Legislative Assembly.

Later with the bifurcation of United Andhra Pradesh into Andhra Pradesh and Telangana, Naidu sworn in as the chief minister of newly bifurcated Andhra Pradesh making it to the formation of his third government after 10 years in opposition. He formed a cabinet of 19 members and reshuffled twice in 2017 and 2018. In the subsequent 2019 election, Naidu's led TDP once again lost power and restricted itself to the opposition by winning only 23 seats. In 2024, Naidu formed the government for the fourth time after being sworn in as Chief Minister on 12 June 2024, following a massive victory in the 2024 polls. The government was established with a cabinet comprising 24 ministers, excluding the Chief Minister himself.

== Legislations ==
Notable legislations enacted during Naidu's tenure includes:

- Andhra Pradesh Scheduled Castes (Rationalisation of Reservations) Act, 2000 – for the sub-classification of Scheduled Castes in the state, which was subsequently deemed unconstitutional by the Supreme Court of India.
- Single Windows Act, 2002 – to establish a robust single-window system for processing industrial approvals.
- Andhra Pradesh Capital Region Development Authority Act, 2014 – for the establishment of the Andhra Pradesh Capital Region Development Authority.
- Public Service Delivery Guarantee Act, 2018 – based on the recommendations of the BRAP 2017 report, to enhance industry friendliness and ensure efficient public service.

== Economic policies ==
=== Investment policy ===
During Naidu's tenure, The Andhra Pradesh government aimed to attract $2 billion of investments and create about 100,000 jobs in the information technology (IT) sector. His government defined the goals in the CII summit and the Infrastructure Mission.

In way of investments and attractive incentives, the Naidu government won the honour of best tourism performing state with about 24% in all national tourist arrivals, record international aircraft movements, and occupancy raised by 100% in the same year. The state government decided to treat the tourism policy similar to that of industrial ventures to attract foreign tourists. This led to employment generation direct and indirectly for 37.7 lakhs people raised by 12% in the hotel and hospitality industry, food and beverage services, recreation and entertainment, cabs and transportation, travel trade and booking services and bagged 6 tourism awards for excellence out of 14 categories at the national level.

=== Ease of doing business ===
The newly formed state of Andhra Pradesh had been ranked as the easiest Indian state to do business in for the two consecutive years in a survey released by the Department of Industrial Policy and Promotion and Ministry of Commerce and Industry. And Andhra Pradesh is the only state to be ranked, at 51, in the Global Competitiveness Index of the World Forum, where India's rank was 56. Andhra Pradesh also ranked top in the Ease of Doing Business according to team of researchers led by Tan Khee Giap, co-director of Asia Competitiveness Institute. Tan recognised chief minister N Chandrababu Naidu's leadership and relentless efforts in shaping a vision for the new sunrise state of Andhra Pradesh.

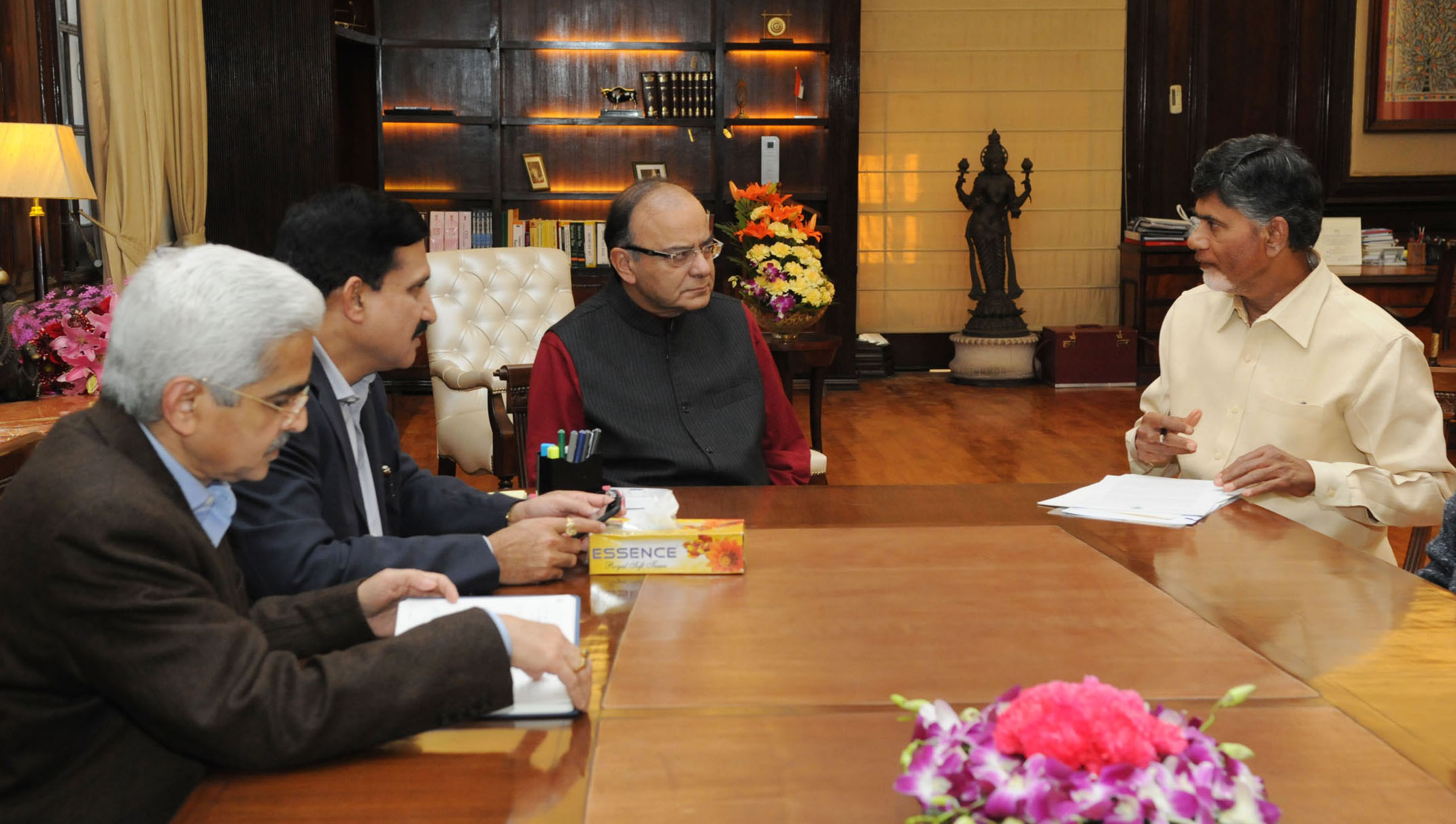
Naidu meeting Arun Jaitley and Shaktikanta Das in 2016

=== Other ===
Naidu headed the chief ministers' committee on digital payments during the time when TDP was part of the BJP-led National Democratic Alliance. During his tenure he submitted an interim report to the Government of India on the issue of banks and financial institutions making digital transactions costlier by levying unwarranted charges and have sought its intervention to subsidise the digital transactions, so that banks and financial institutions are not burdened and the citizens find digital transactions attractive.

== E-governance ==
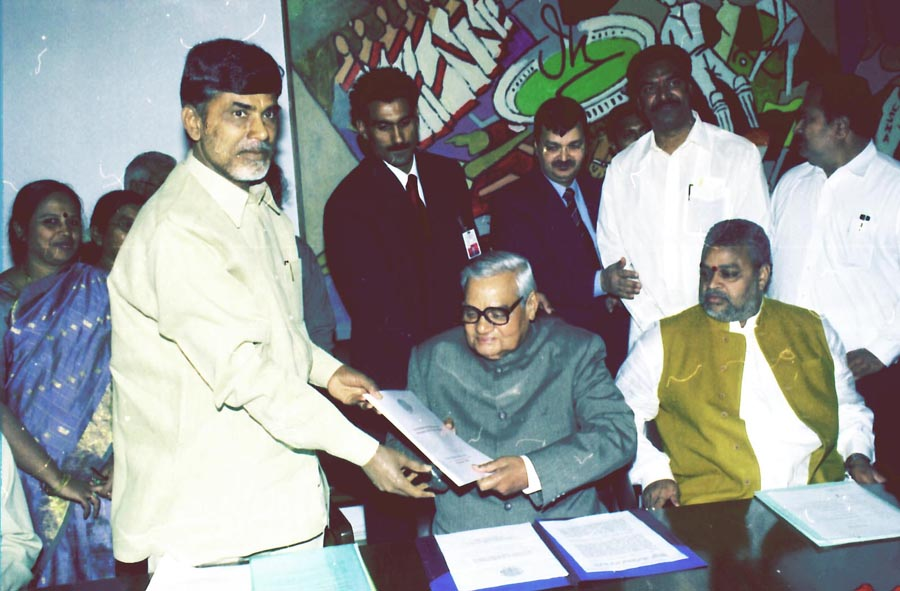
Naidu with the then Prime Minister of India Atal Bihari Vajpayee in 2003

=== e-Seva ===
With the attempt to take the benefits of e-governance to the citizens, Naidu launched e-Seva centers in 2001 for paperless and speedy delivery of results to applicants. These e-Seva centers served the purpose of one-stop solution providing all government information and services online such as utility bills, banking services, issuing birth and death certificates, written test for drivers licence, government orders, and APSRTC tours and travel operators booking. The government introduced an outsourcing employee system where government-related services are done under a contract agreement and after a certain period of time, the employees are granted the status of permanent government employees.

=== Real Time Governance Society ===
Real Time Governance Society is an Indian e-governance initiative of chief minister Naidu. It was formed on 6 September 2017. The department reports to the chief minister. The idea is to use electronic communication and technology to deploy e-governance in Andhra Pradesh. It has 13 district centers and 1 state center for reporting. Data from Andhra Pradesh Weather Forecasting and Early Warning Research Center, drones, machine learning systems, biometric systems and other surveillance systems are collated and reported through the RTGS system in real-time. A call center addresses internal grievances.

== Initiatives ==
=== Janmabhoomi (Birthplace) ===
Naidu launched the Janmabhoomi programme in February 1996. The main aim was to involve people in the reconstruction and revitalisation of the society. The programme works at a micro level, planning to identify people-represented problems through Gram Sabha discussions by regional officers, especially in villages, and to send project proposals for the government to work on. The core concentrated areas are community work, primary school education, drinking water, health and hospitals, family welfare, and environmental protection through watershed and joint forest management activities. The programme was subsequently continued during his third term.

From 1997 onward, the 'Clean and Green Campaign' was initiated where school students and teachers participated in institutional and household plantation with government employees. A total of 46 million trees in the Telangana and Andhra Pradesh state were planted. About 3,906,835 people participated in sanitation work, with 1,438,850 persons engaged to remove garbage and 40,921,447 people participated in health awareness rallies. The Naidu idea was to make every habitation and municipal ward 'clean and green' and it was one of the largest and most successful events organised by his government.

=== Self Help Groups ===
Naidu's government started the "self help groups" (SHG) such as water user associations, Vanasamrakshana Samities, Rythu Mithra Groups, CMEY Groups, School Education Committees, and promoted the 'Development of Women and Children in Rural Areas' (DWCRA) where each group had 15-20 female members and chose a leader who conducted group meetings. The main purpose was to offer microfinance through government and bank-linkage that would help rural women to start income generating activities, know about their rights, and the importance of education. The Naidu government distributed two lakh (two-hundred-thousand) bicycles to the girls who joined the government high schools as part of women empowerment initiative.

=== Prajalato Mukhyamantri (Dial your Chief minister) ===
Prajalato Mukhyamantri a phone-in initiative is a programme that encourages open dialogue between the chief minister and the common people of Andhra Pradesh state. There is a live broadcast every Monday, on both Doordarshan and All India Radio (AIR) where Naidu interacts with the callers directly to know their issues and address them. The live show is conducted in two sessions: in the first session, there is a discussion with vice-chancellors, academics, and writers and in the second session, there is interaction with the people. Naidu was described as "a leader, who mingled with the masses after shedding his official status and time as Chief Minister." The innovative program found acceptance in the country's information and broadcasting systems.

=== Rythu Bazaar (Farmers Market) ===
Rythu Bazaar was launched by Naidu on 26 January 1999 with the objective to control the skyrocketing prices of fruits and vegetables. Under this program, farmers were encouraged to sell their produce directly to the consumers and in the process, eliminate the middleman. In the first phase itself, the program succeeded and reached various towns. Prices were down by 70 to 75 percent, and it benefited both the farmers and the direct consumers.

=== Anna Canteen ===
During his tenure the government also started the Anna Canteen initiative in various parts of the state to offer breakfast, lunch and dinner at ₹5 each. Naidu launched the programme by inaugurated a canteen in Vijayawada on 11 July 2018. A total of 60 Canteens were opened in the first phase across the state. The Akshaya Patra Foundation was contracted to run these canteens.

== Infrastructure ==
=== HITEC City ===
In November 1998, Atal Bihari Vajpayee, then prime minister of India and Chandrababu Naidu inaugurated the HITEC City (nickanamed Cyberabad) by opening the Cyber Towers, a landmark building in Hyderabad. In anticipation of the growth of technology in the future, his government also concentrated on providing infrastructure such as roads, safety and resilience, transportation, telecommunications, IT parks and five-star hotels for the delegates' meetings and accommodation and the HITEX International Convention and Exhibition Center.

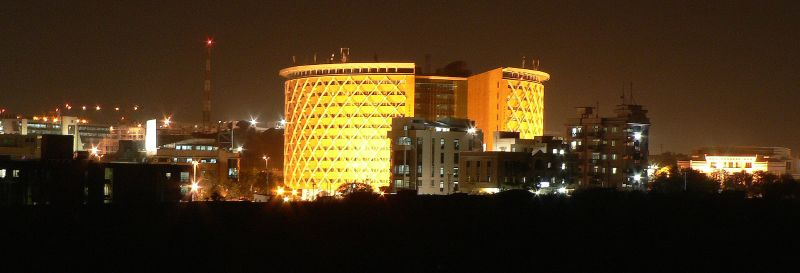
Cyber Towers at HITEC City, a landmark building in Hyderabad was inaugurated during Naidu's tenure in 1998

Naidu once coined the slogan "Bye-bye Bangalore, hello Hyderabad" to further this aim and his government allotted lands and laid the foundations for major IT parks such as L&T Infocity Ascendas Park, Cyber Gateway, Raheja Mindspace Madhapur IT Park, and CyberPearl IT Park to partake in the IT industry boom. Naidu, at a press conference, discussed his plan to develop the state of Andhra Pradesh by making the major cities showpieces for foreign investment, especially in "key sectors such as information technology, biotechnology, healthcare, and various outsourcing services" and gave a brief PowerPoint presentation to Bill Gates that convinced him to establish Microsoft Corporation Research and Development (R&D) in Hyderabad, the company's second-largest research and development campus outside the United States, a significant milestone in Hyderabad's bid to become an information technology hub.

In 2001, the Naidu government declared the creation of the Cyberabad Development Authority (CDA) as a special enclave for the location of IT firms, research institutions and allied services around the existing HITEC City area in Hyderabad. Spread over an area of 52 km2, in the western periphery of the city covering the townships of Madhapur, Gachibowli, Kondapur, Manikonda, and Nanakramguda, CDA CDA was conceived as a self-contained enclave providing premium infrastructure, such as gated residential housing, intelligent buildings, shopping malls, and transport facilities among others.

According to several national and international surveys, Hyderabad became an IT Hotspot of India in 2002 and Hyderabad became ranked number one in the city competitiveness compared of major cities in India to attract businesses. The economic reforms and new policy initiatives taken by the Naidu government in creating HITEC City provided a boost to Hyderabad's urbanisation and, with big tech industry jobs in hand, has increased consumer purchasing power, leading to massive real estate developments, gated residential apartments, food and restaurants, intelligent business offices, cinema, and shopping malls in the area and Naidu's efforts to make HITEC City India's first and largest cybercity while today Cyberabad is a big technological project in Hyderabad, which emerged as the backbone of Telangana state's economy.

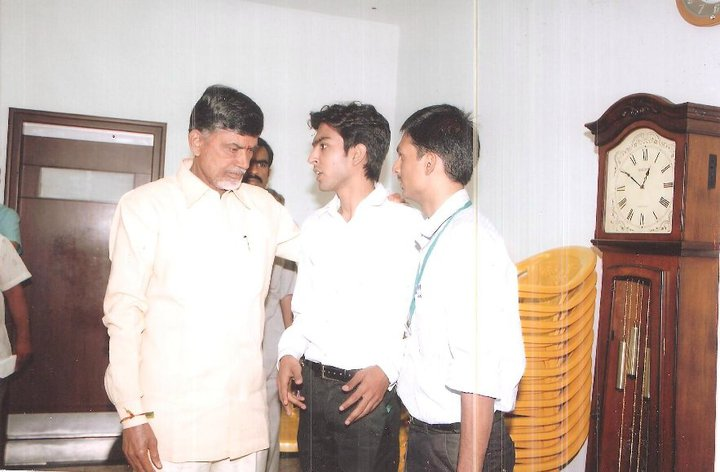
Naidu in discussion with students as the chief minister of Andhra Pradesh

=== Genome Valley ===
in 1999, Naidu established the Pharma City, an original, state-of-the-art biotechnology park in the country to the north of Hyderabad and promoted Genome Valley to leading multinational pharmaceutical companies like Novartis Pharma India, Shantha Biotechnics, Bharat Biotech, Biocon, Biological E. Limited, Jupiter Biosciences, and also requested other global IT companies like IBM, Dell, HSBC, Oracle Corporation to move to Hyderabad, making presentations to global CEOs and convincing them to invest and establish offices in Hyderabad.

=== Rajiv Gandhi International Airport ===
Rajiv Gandhi International Airport (formerly Shamshabad Airport) is an initiative of Chief Minister Naidu. When Hyderabad was attracting global investments the then operating Begumpet Airport was unable to handle air traffic. To promote the planned development of the area around the international airport, the Naidu government declared a special development area and called it as Hyderabad Airport Development Authority (HADA). Naidu led government acquired 5,495 acres of land for the airport in 2003. The airport was built on public private partnership basis, where only land is provided by the government, but entire construction cost and planning has to be taken care by Grandhi Mallikarjuna Rao Group and Malaysia Airports Holdings Berhad in exchange of 76% stake in airport. The land lease and state share holder agreement was completed in 2003. Central concession agreement was signed by Dr. Manmohan Singh in December 2004. The airport construction has started and completed between 2005 and 2008 by GMR.

=== Hyderabad Multi-Modal Transport System ===
In 2003, Hyderabad Multi-Modal Transport System, which began construction in 2001, was opened to the public under the Naidu Government. A joint venture between the Government of Andhra Pradesh and the South Central Railway, The Phase-I was flagged off with the first MMTS train at Secunderabad railway station by the Deputy Prime Minister L. K. Advani while Naidu inaugurated its second leg. Over an operational length of 100+ km, spanning 53 stations, the system operates over three major routes, Falaknuma–Lingampalli, Hyderabad–Falaknuma and Hyderabad–Lingampalli & Secunderabad Medchal, Falaknuma Umdanagar, Lingampalli Ramachandrapuram, Sanathnagar Moula Ali Ghatkesar.

=== Sports ===
In 2002 during Naidu's second term, the government of the state planned for the construction of the G. M. C. Balayogi Athletic Stadium, a multipurpose stadium at Gachibowli, Hyderabad to host the 2003 Afro-Asian Games which was named in honour of the former Lok Sabha speaker G. M. C. Balayogi. This tenure also witnessed the commissioning of the construction of Rajiv Gandhi International Cricket Stadium as proposed by the Hyderabad Cricket Association in 2003 and the government allocated the land for the purpose in Uppal, Hyderabad along with the contract for an open auction for the construction which was later inaugurated by the subsequent congress government after the completion of the stadium in entirely and named to honour the former Prime minister Rajiv Gandhi.

=== Amaravati Capital Region ===
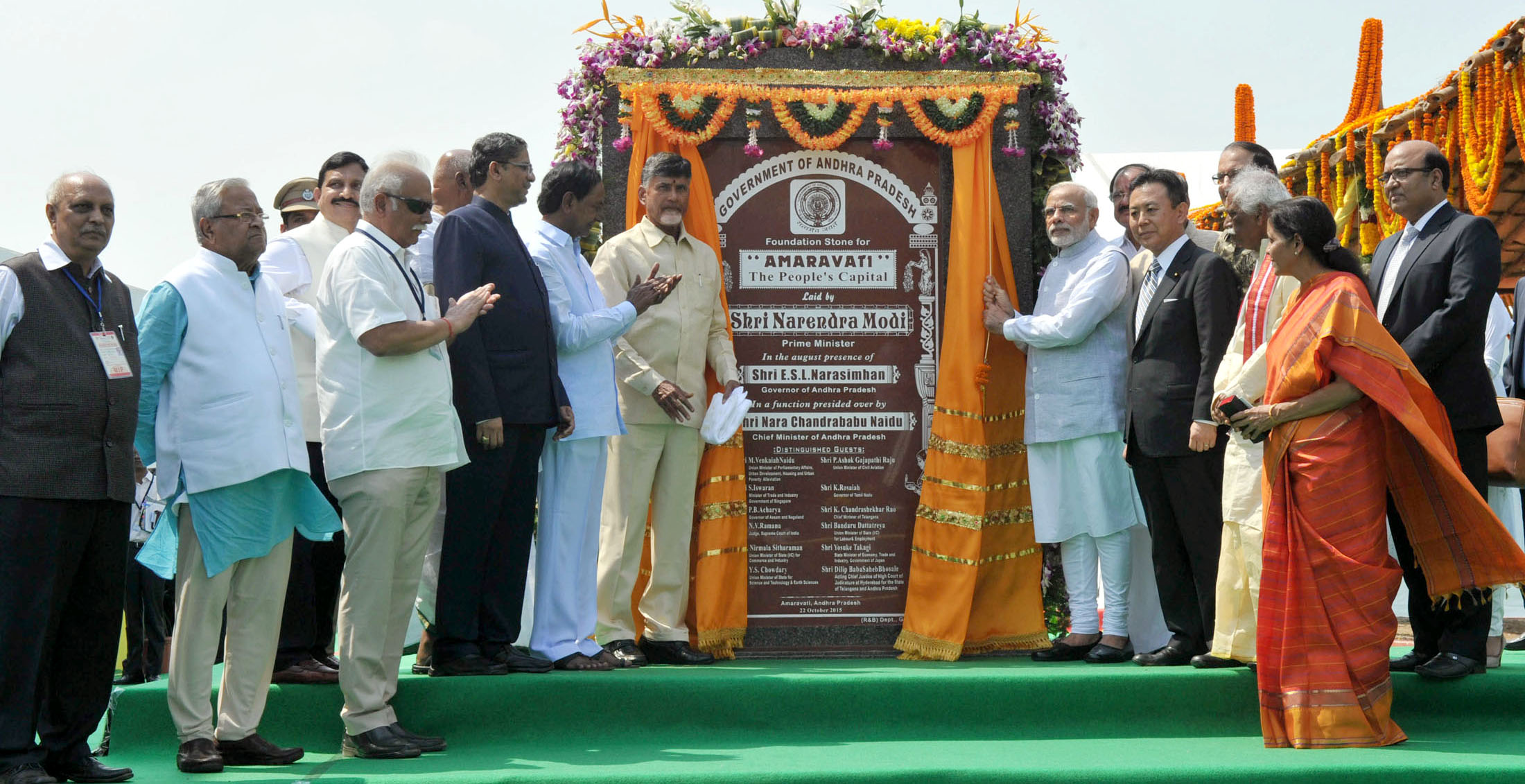
Prime Minister Narendra Modi lays foundation stone of Amaravati in 2014

After the bifurcation of Andhra Pradesh, Naidu planned for a new capital city at Amaravati for Andhra Pradesh. Prime minister Narendra Modi attended the foundation stone laying ceremony and performed the pooja rituals.

== Welfare policies ==
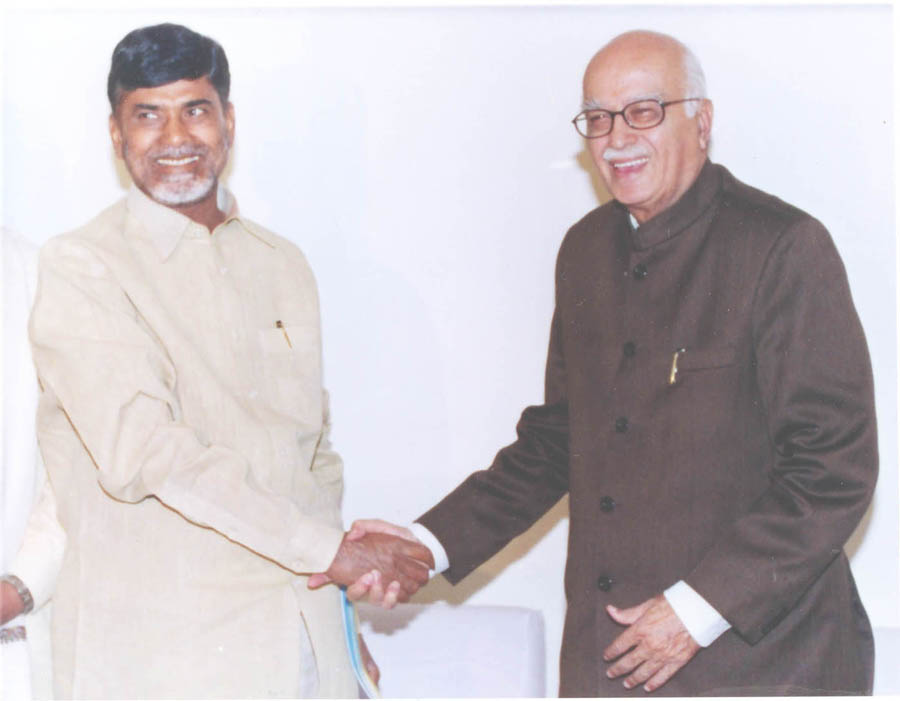
Naidu meeting the then Deputy Prime Minister of India L. K. Advani in 2004

In July 1999, Naidu launched the Deepam scheme to provide LPG cooking gas connections to rural women, with a budget of ₹100 crore (equivalent to ₹365 crore or US$46 million in 2020). The central government agreed to provide one million LPG connections via this scheme. This scheme was later extended to urban areas by formally releasing the liquefied petroleum gas cylinders to some women beneficiaries. Under the scheme, the state government pays the security deposit of Rs 1,000 per connection to the oil company.

A five-fold hike in the Social security pension scheme was introduced in 2014 increasing the amount of the pension from ₹200 to ₹1000 effective from October 2014. Later in the year 2018 the benefit amount was again increased from ₹1000 to ₹2000 with effective from January 2019 to benefit 5 million old aged people. A similar pension scheme NTR Bharosa was introduced to benefit the vulnerable sections of the society covering old aged, weavers, widows, disabled, toddy toppers, transgender people, fishermen and also to people needing Antiretroviral Therapy and suffering with Chronic Kidney Disease of Unknown Aetiology.

Videshi Vidya Deevena Scheme was introduced applicable for members from economically weak families of Kapu community of Andhra Pradesh who aspire to do their Graduate (only MBBS), Post Graduate, MS or Ph.D. courses abroad. Financial assistance of ₹1,000,000 shall be granted to the selected applicants through the prescribed process. A later similar scheme called "NTR Videshi Vidya Scheme" was introduced for the welfare of the Bc community.

Loan waiver scheme was introduced to waive off the loans of women self help groups like DWCRA. Later financial benefit scheme like Pasupu Kunkuma was introduced to provide financial aid to SHGs where each beneficiary is provided with ₹10,000 in cash and a smart phone.

Mukhyamantri Yuvanestham scheme was introduced to provide financial aid of ₹1000 every month to the unemployed youth ranging from the age of 20 to 30 years.

During Naidu's third term a total of 21 welfare schemes were introduced in the newly bifurcated state of Andhra Pradesh namely NTR Vaidya Seva, Chandranna Bima, Chandranna Sankranthi Kanuka, Chandranna Ramzan Taufa, Chandranna Kapu Bhavan Chandranna Pelli Kanuka etc.

== Irrigation ==
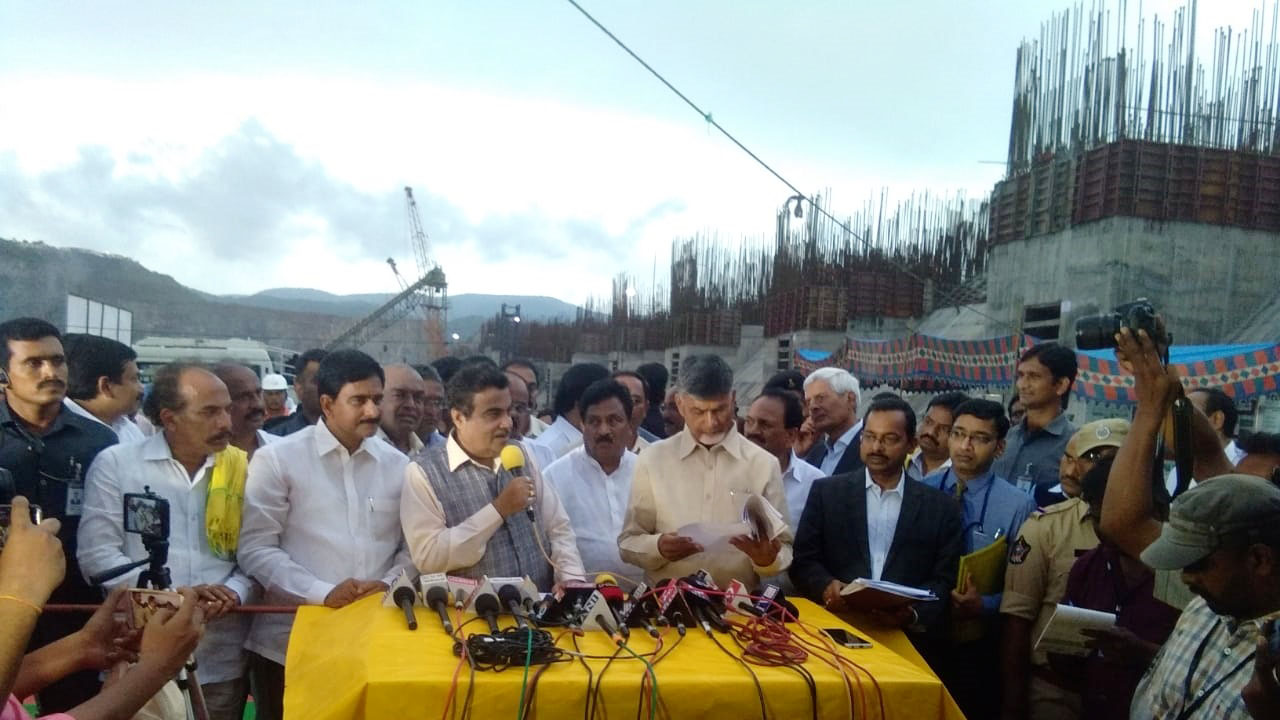
Naidu with Nitin Gadkari and other officials at the Polavaram Project

=== Pattiseema ===
Pattiseema Lift Irrigation Project is a river interlinking project connecting Godavari River to Krishna River. It was inaugurated by Naidu in March 2016 while it was completed in span of one year and holds a record in Limca Book of Records.

=== Other ===
Naidu inaugurated Potharlanka Lift irrigation scheme in 2018 constructed at a cost of 50 Crore rupees in Guntur district to facilitate the irrigation of 5000 acres of land in 11 villages.

== Vision 2020 ==
In 1999, Naidu produced a vision statement called "Andhra Pradesh Vision 2020" that outlined various goals and objectives to be achieved by 2020. It was prepared in collaboration with US consultants, McKinsey & Company, who proposed the following:

- Poverty must be eradicated. Support the elderly and children, those who really need help.
- The people should be given the opportunity to live a healthy life along with practice and income.
- Small families should be encouraged for a healthy and prosperous society.
- Provide a happy life for little girls. They should be given the opportunity to use their energy 100 percent.
- Safeguard its environment and make its cities and villages clean, green and safe to live in.
- Enable small entrepreneurs and young professionals to make startups and build thriving industries and services business.
- Women and girls need to be empowered and supported to compete equally with men in society and in the economy.
- People should be provided with resources such as investments and infrastructure. These can transform their future.
- New techniques in agriculture, upmarket services, and innovations for quality produce should be promoted.
- The government should be transparent, accountable and responsive.
- The people's voice should be heard loud and clear during the rule.

After returning as Chief Minister in 2014, Naidu updated the document to version 2.0, titled Sunrise AP Vision 2029.

== Other events ==
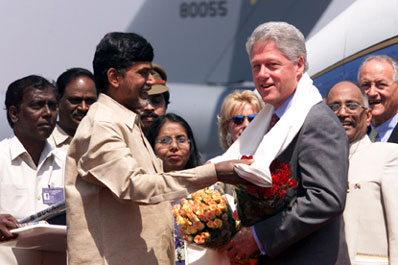
Naidu greeting Bill Clinton in 2000

In 2000, both Bill Clinton (President of the United States) and Tony Blair (Prime Minister of the United Kingdom) visited Hyderabad and met with Naidu. Bobby Ghosh of the American news magazine, Time commented, "In just five years, he has turned an impoverished, rural backwater place into India's new information-technology hub", and the magazine named Naidu, 'South Asian of the Year'.

=== Afro-Asian Games ===
The Afro-Asian Games was the largest sporting event ever held in Hyderabad, and one of the largest in India during the Naidu tenure from 23 October 2003 to 1 November 2003.

=== Cyclone Hudhud ===
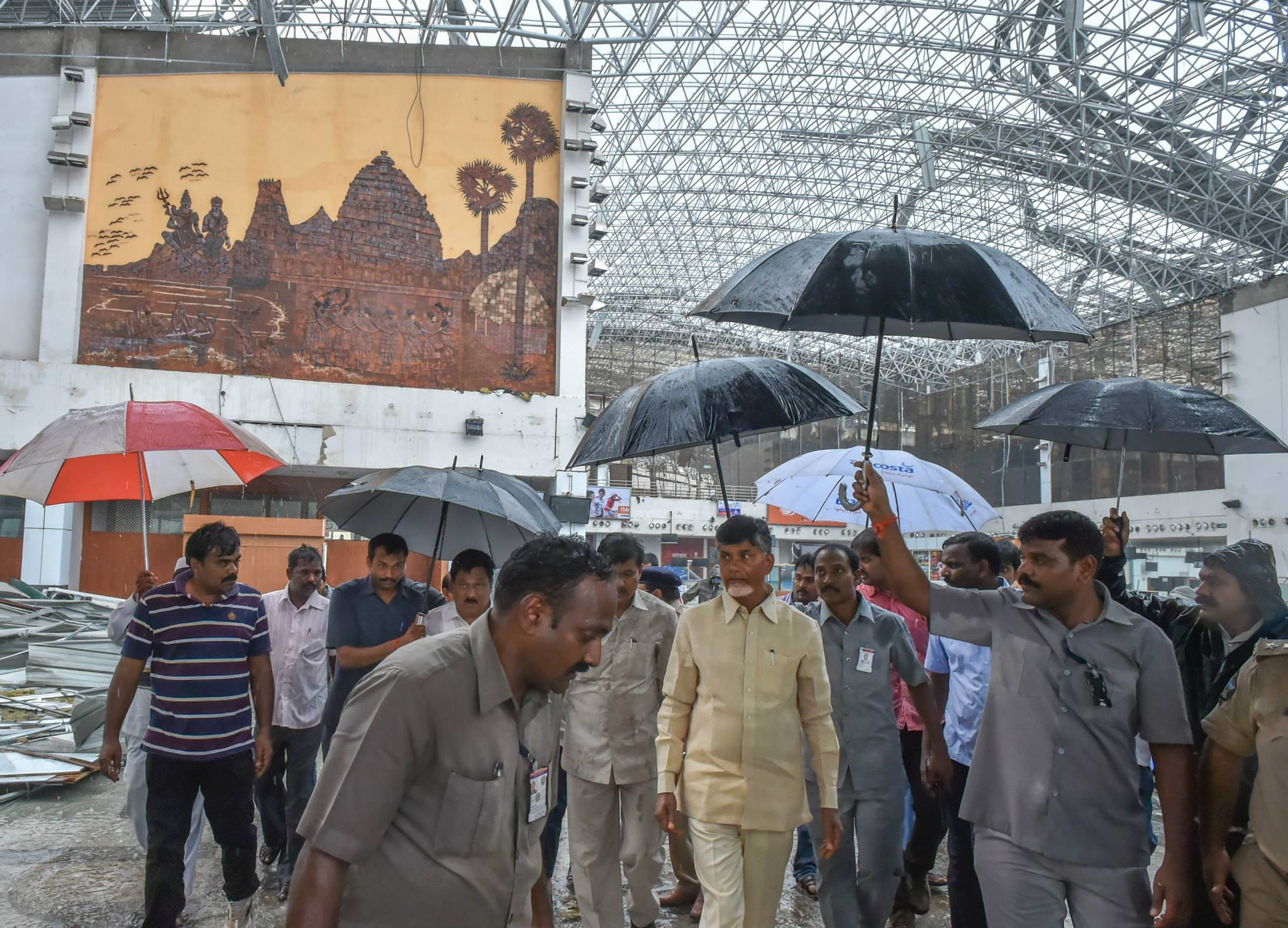
Naidu at Vishakhapatnam airport during cyclone Hudhud in 2014

In the year 2014, Visakhapatnam and the neighbouring districts of Vizianagaram and Srikakulam of Andhra Pradesh was affected with a cyclone called Hudhud during Naidu's third term. He was lauded for his efforts in disaster management during the cyclone. He mobilised the Army, Navy, and the National Disaster Response Force to provide relief to over 280,000 people in 44 mandals across four districts. He shifted base from Hyderabad to Visakhapatnam after the cyclone made landfall. To monitor the disaster relief work that was being undertaken, he stayed in a bus parked outside the city collectorate. He also undertook visits to districts bordering Odisha such as Srikakulam which were badly hit by the cyclone. Post the disaster, he vowed to rebuild Vizag which was badly affected by it.

=== AP AgTech Summit 2017 ===
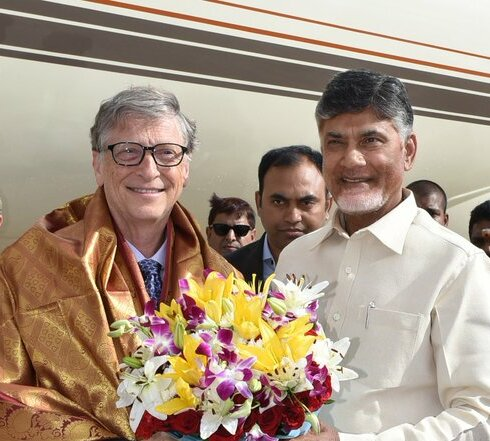
Naidu with Bill Gates at Visakhapatnam in 2017

In 2017, Bill Gates again met Naidu at Vishakhapatnam, Addressing the valedictory of the three-day AP AgTech Summit 2017, the co-chair of Bill and Melinda Gates Foundation where he recalled that he was really excited at meeting Andhra Pradesh Chief Minister N. Chandrababu Naidu for the first time over 20 years ago. Gates visited the exhibition stalls in the summit along with Andhra Pradesh chief minister. The summit focused on innovative ideas, technologies and global best practices to push agricultural transformation in the state.

== See also ==
- N. Chandrababu Naidu
- First N. Chandrababu Naidu ministry
- Second N. Chandrababu Naidu ministry
- Third N. Chandrababu Naidu ministry
- Telugu Desam Party
