= Nellore Rural Assembly constituency =

Constituency of the Andhra Pradesh Legislative Assembly, India

Coordinates: 14.38°N 79.95°E

Nellore Rural
- Constituency No. 118 for the Andhra Pradesh Legislative Assembly
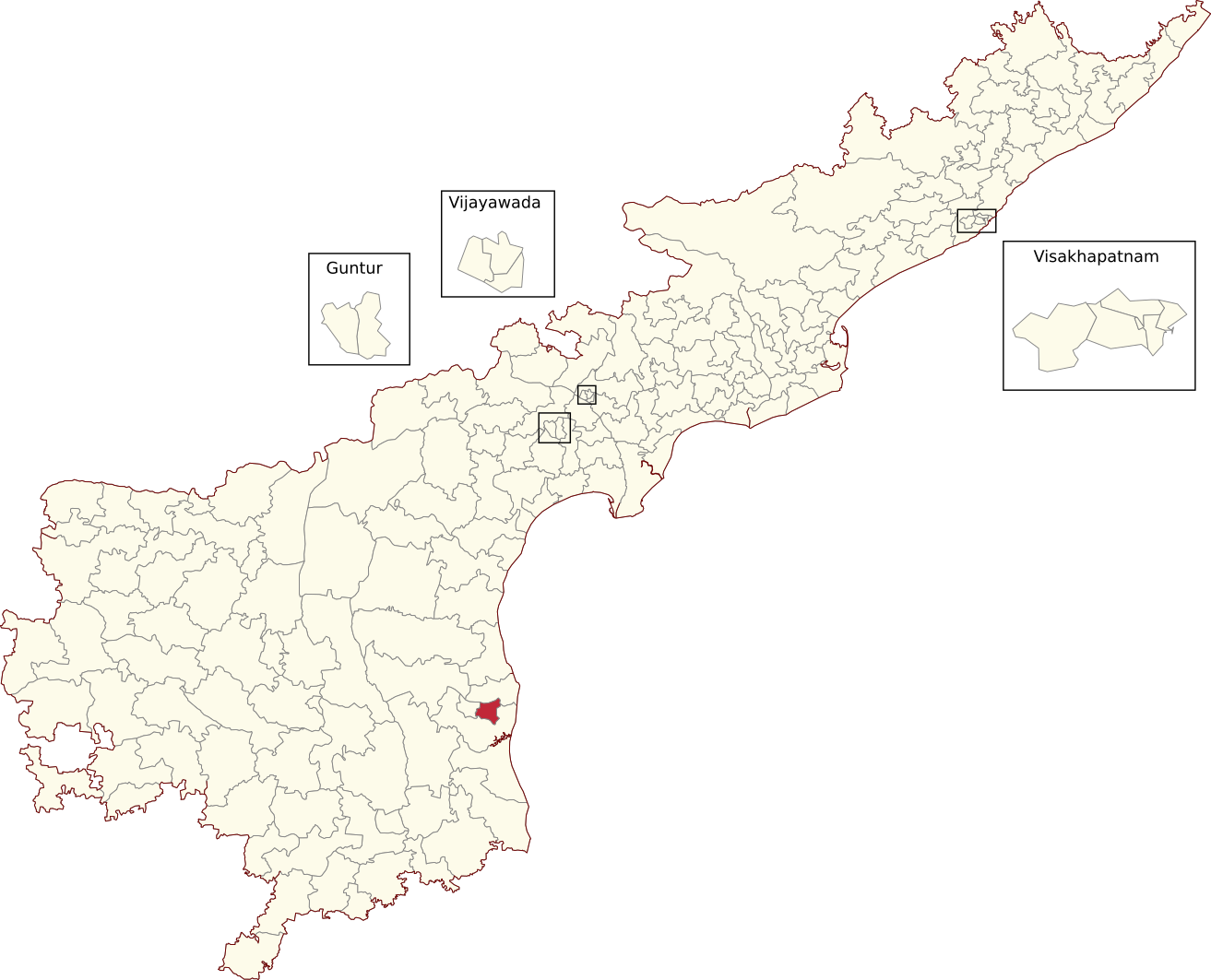
- Location of Nellore Rural Assembly constituency within Andhra Pradesh

Constituency details
- Country: India
- Region: South India
- State: Andhra Pradesh
- District: Nellore
- Lok Sabha constituency: Nellore
- Established: 2008
- Total electors: 2,26,906
- Reservation: None

Member of Legislative Assembly
- 16th Andhra Pradesh Legislative Assembly
- Incumbent Kotamreddy Sridhar Reddy
- Party: TDP
- Alliance: NDA
- Elected year: 2024

Nellore Rural Assembly constituency is a constituency in Nellore district of Andhra Pradesh that elects representatives to the Andhra Pradesh Legislative Assembly in India. It is one of the seven assembly segments of Nellore Lok Sabha constituency.

Kotamreddy Sridhar Reddy is the current MLA of the constituency, having won the 2024 Andhra Pradesh Legislative Assembly election from Telugu Desam Party. As of 2019, there were a total of 254,585 electors in the constituency. The constituency was established in 2008, as per the Delimitation Orders (2008).

== Mandals ==
As per the Delimitation Orders (2008), the constituency covers Nellore mandal (Part), Golla Kandukur, Sajjapuram, Vellanti, Kandamur, Upputur, South Mopur, Mogallapalem, Mattempadu, Amancherla, Mannavarappadu, Mulumudi, Devarapalem, Pottepalem, Akkacheruvupadu, Ogurupadu, Ambapuram, Donthali, Buja Buja Nellore (Rural), Kallurpalle (Rural), Kanuparthipadu, Allipuram (Rural), Gudipallipadu, Pedda, Cherukur, Chintareddipalem, Visavaviletipadu, Gundlapalem, Kakupalle-I, Kakupalle -II (Madaraja Gudur) and Penubarthi Villages. Nellore mandal (M+OG) (Part), Nellore (M) - Ward No.16 to 26, 29 and 30, Allipuram (OG) (Part) - Ward No.45, Kallurpalle (OG) (Part) - Ward No.46 Buja Buja Nellore (OG) (Part) - Ward No.47, Nellore (Bit.1) (OG) - Ward No.48.

== Members of the Legislative Assembly ==
Year	Member	Political party
2009	Anam Vivekananda Reddy	Indian National Congress
2014	Kotamreddy Sridhar Reddy	YSR Congress Party
2019	Kotamreddy Sridhar Reddy	YSR Congress Party
2024	Kotamreddy Sridhar Reddy	Telugu Desam Party

== Election results ==
=== 2009 ===
2009 Andhra Pradesh Legislative Assembly election: Nellore Rural
Party	Candidate	Votes	%	±%
INC	Anam Vivekananda Reddy	46,941	37.82	
PRP	Anam Venkata Ramana Reddy	43,810	35.30	
CPI(M)	T. P. Bhanu Raju	23,143	18.65	
Majority		3,131	2.52	
Turnout		124,110	54.70	
INC win (new seat)				

=== 2014 ===
2014 Andhra Pradesh Legislative Assembly election: Nellore Rural
Party	Candidate	Votes	%	±%
YSRCP	Kotamreddy Sridhar Reddy	79,103	49.94	
BJP	Sannapureddy Suresh Reddy	53,450	33.74	
Majority		25,653	16.20	
Turnout		158,406	60.56	+5.86
YSRCP gain from INC		Swing		

=== 2019 ===
2019 Andhra Pradesh Legislative Assembly election: Nellore Rural
Party	Candidate	Votes	%	±%
YSRCP	Kotamreddy Sridhar Reddy	85,724	51.61%	
TDP	Abdul Aziz	64,948	39.10%	
Majority		20,776	12.51	
Turnout		158,406	60.56	+5.86
YSRCP hold		Swing		

=== 2024 ===
2024 Andhra Pradesh Legislative Assembly election: Nellore Rural
Party	Candidate	Votes	%	±%
TDP	Kotamreddy Sridhar Reddy	109,975	56.53	
YSRCP	Adala Prabhakara Reddy	75,495	38.81	
INC	Shaik Fayaz	4,280	2.2	
NOTA	None of the above	2,016	1.04	
Majority		34,480	19.72	
Turnout		1,94,542		
TDP gain from YSRCP		Swing		

== See also ==
- List of constituencies of Andhra Pradesh
- Legislative Assembly
