= Poluboina Anil Kumar =

Indian politician

Poluboina Anil Kumar Yadav
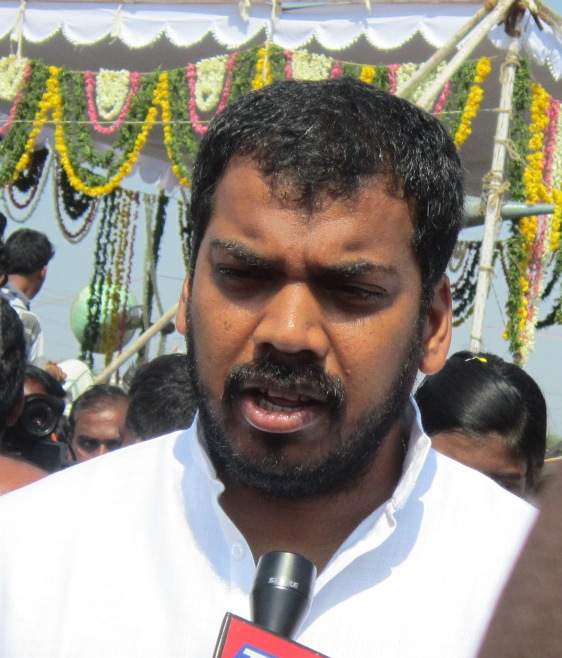

Minister of Water Resources Development Government of Andhra Pradesh
- In office 8 June 2019 – 7 April 2022
- Governor: E. S. L. Narasimhan; Biswabhusan Harichandan
- Chief Minister: Y. S. Jaganmohan Reddy
- Preceded by: Devineni Uma Maheswara Rao
- Succeeded by: Ambati Rambabu

Member of Legislative Assembly, Andhra Pradesh
- In office 2014–2024
- Preceded by: Mungamuru Sridhara Krishna Reddy
- Succeeded by: Ponguru Narayana
- Constituency: Nellore City

Personal details
- Party: YSR Congress Party
- Other political affiliations: Indian National Congress
- Occupation: Politician

Poluboina Anil Kumar Yadav is an Indian politician from the YSR Congress Party. He has contested as a YSR Congress Party member in 2014 and 2019 elections for Member of Legislative Assembly from Nellore City constituency and won the elections. He is a former Minister for Irrigation (Water Resources) in Andhra Pradesh.
