= Nellore City Assembly constituency =

Constituency of the Andhra Pradesh Legislative Assembly, India

Coordinates: 14.44°N 79.98°E

Nellore City
- Constituency No. 117 for the Andhra Pradesh Legislative Assembly
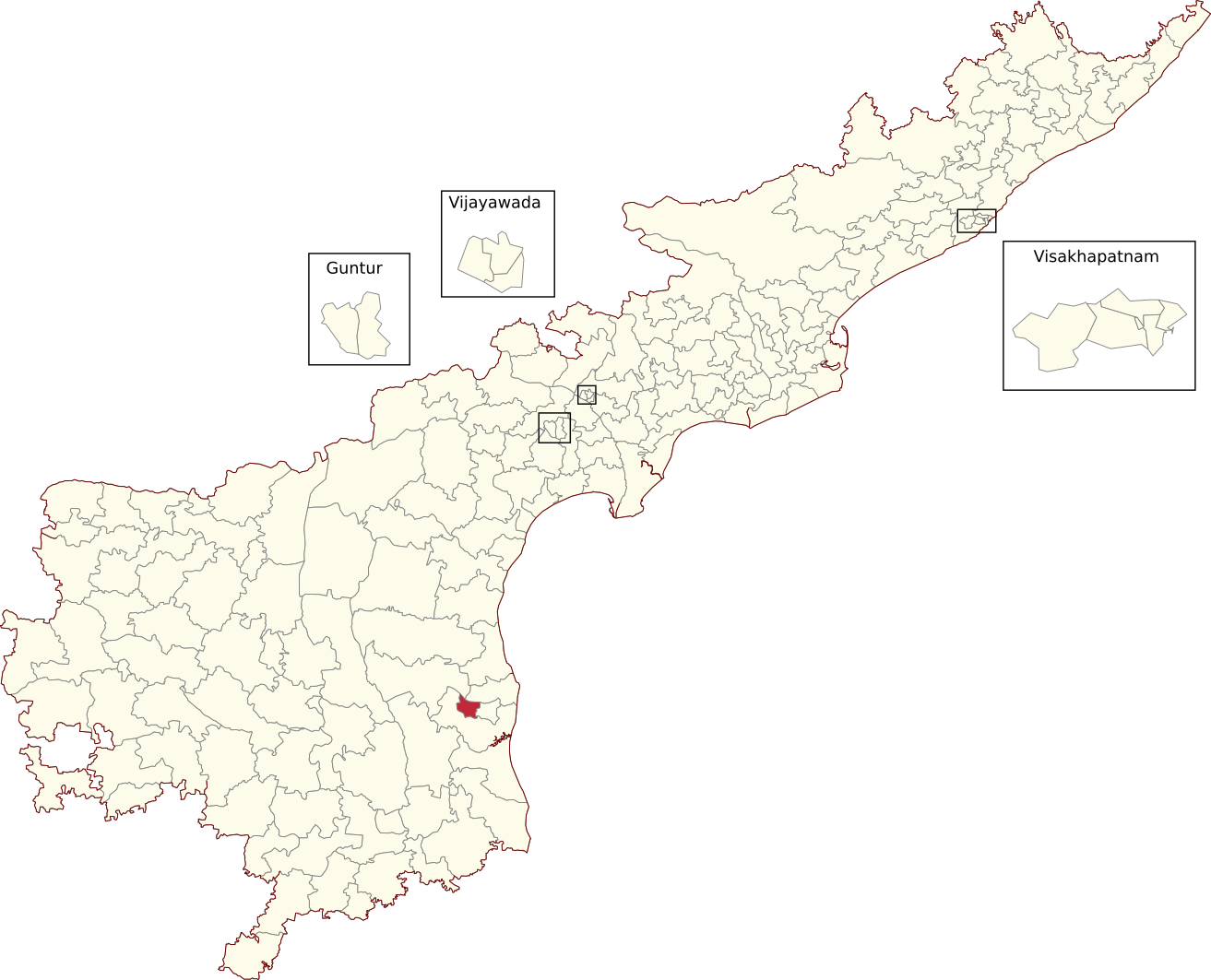
- Location of Nellore City Assembly constituency within Andhra Pradesh

Constituency details
- Country: India
- Region: South India
- State: Andhra Pradesh
- District: Nellore
- Lok Sabha constituency: Nellore
- Established: 2008
- Total electors: 208,469
- Reservation: None

Member of Legislative Assembly
- 16th Andhra Pradesh Legislative Assembly
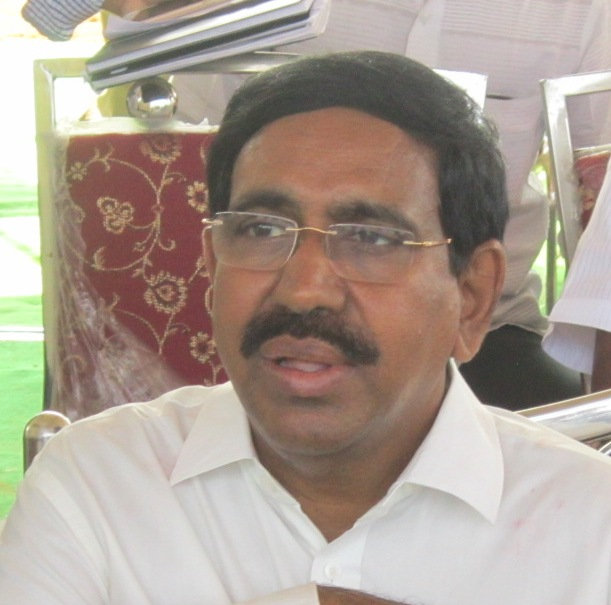
- Incumbent Ponguru Narayana
- Party: TDP
- Alliance: NDA
- Elected year: 2024

Nellore City Assembly constituency is a constituency in Nellore district of Andhra Pradesh that elects representatives to the Andhra Pradesh Legislative Assembly in India. It is one of the seven assembly segments of Nellore Lok Sabha constituency.

Ponguru Narayana is the current MLA of the constituency, having won the 2024 Andhra Pradesh Legislative Assembly election from Telugu Desam Party. As of 2019, there are a total of 208,469 electors in the constituency. The constituency was established in 2008, as per the Delimitation Orders (2008)

== Members of the Legislative Assembly ==
Year	Member	Political party
2009	Mungamuru Sridhara Krishna Reddy	Praja Rajyam Party
2014	Anil Kumar Poluboina	YSR Congress Party
2019	Anil Kumar Poluboina	YSR Congress Party
2024	Ponguru Narayana	Telugu Desam Party

== Election results ==
=== 2024 ===
2024 Andhra Pradesh Legislative Assembly election: Nellore City
Party	Candidate	Votes	%	±%
TDP	Ponguru Narayana	120,551	68.99	
YSRCP	Mohammad Khaleel Ahamad	48,062	27.51	
CPI(M)	Mulam Ramesh	2,038	1.17	
NOTA	None of the above	967	0.55	
Majority		72,489	41.48	
Turnout		1,74,738		
TDP gain from YSRCP		Swing		

=== 2019 ===
2019 Andhra Pradesh Legislative Assembly election: Nellore City
Party	Candidate	Votes	%	±%
YSRCP	Anil Kumar Poluboina	74,040	47.38	−5.89
TDP	Ponguru Narayana	71,052	46.13	+6.55
JSP	Kethamreddy Vinod Reddy	8,300	3.47	
Majority		2,988	1.25	
Turnout		158,363	61	+6.18
YSRCP hold		Swing		

=== 2014 ===
2014 Andhra Pradesh Legislative Assembly election: Nellore City
Party	Candidate	Votes	%	±%
YSRCP	Anil Kumar Poluboina	74,372	53.24	
TDP	Sridhara Krishna Reddy	55,285	39.58	
Majority		19,087	13.61	
Turnout		140,310	57.43	+4.18
YSRCP gain from PRP		Swing		

=== 2009 ===
2009 Andhra Pradesh Legislative Assembly election: Nellore City
Party	Candidate	Votes	%	±%
PRP	Mungamuru Sridhara Krishna Reddy	36,103	33.93	
INC	Anil Kumar Poluboina	36,013	33.85	
TDP	Tallapaka Ramesh Reddy	26,173	24.60	
Majority		90	0.08	
Turnout		106,389	53.25	
PRP win (new seat)				
