= Narasapuram Lok Sabha constituency =

Lok Sabha Constituency in Andhra Pradesh

Coordinates: 16.4°N 81.7°E

Narasapuram
- Lok Sabha constituency
- Interactive Map Outlining Narasapuram Lok Sabha constituency

Constituency details
- Country: India
- Region: South India
- State: Andhra Pradesh
- Assembly constituencies: Achanta; Palakollu; Narasapuram; Bhimavaram; Undi; Tanuku; Tadepalligudem
- Established: 1952
- Total electors: 11,74,441
- Reservation: None

Member of Parliament
- 18th Lok Sabha
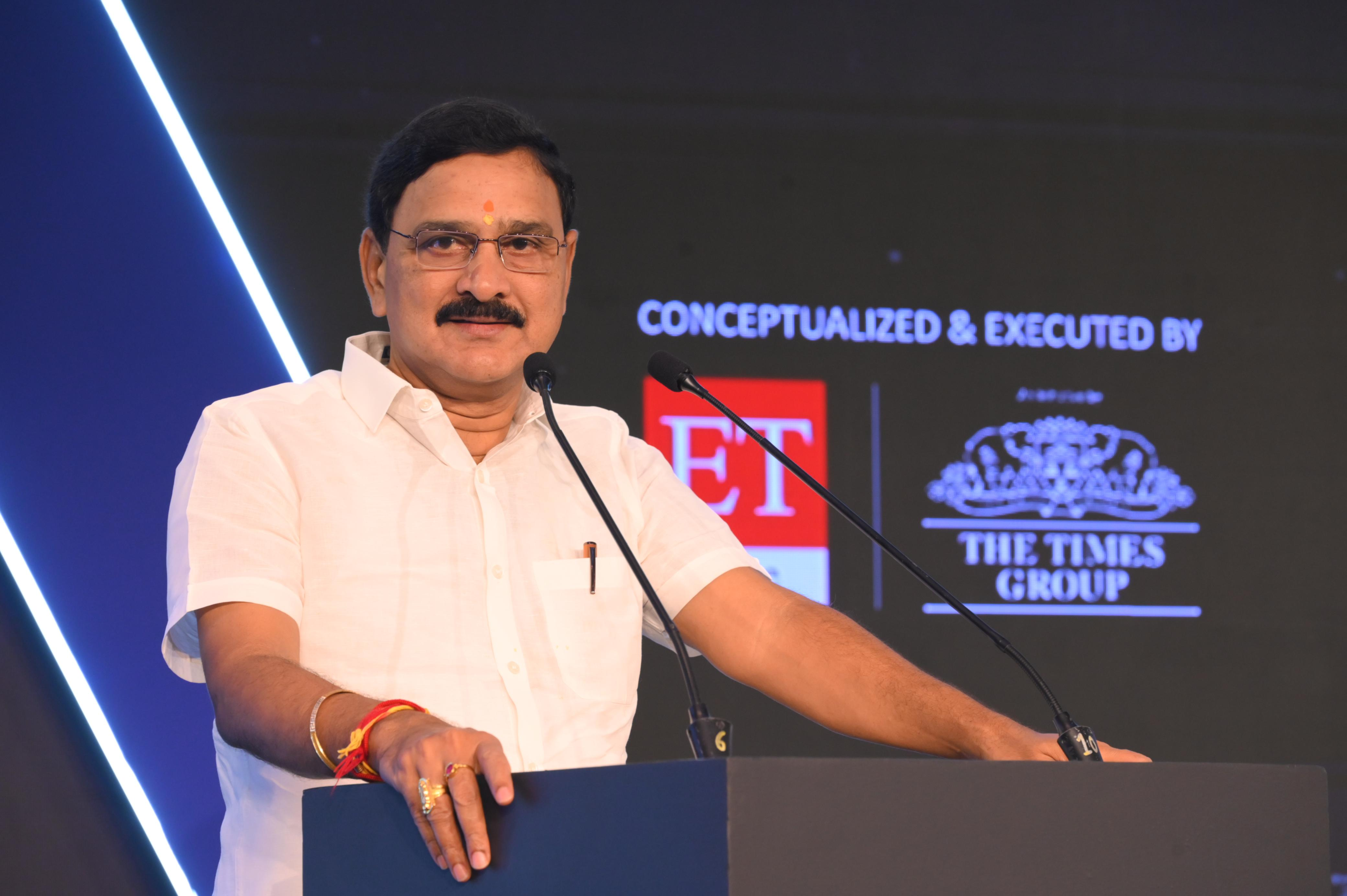
- Incumbent Bhupathi Raju Srinivasa Varma
- Party: BJP
- Alliance: NDA
- Elected year: 2024
- Preceded by: Raghu Rama Krishna Raju

Narasapuram Lok Sabha constituency is one of the twenty-five lok sabha constituencies of Andhra Pradesh in India. It comprises seven assembly segments and belongs to West Godavari district.

== Assembly Segments ==
Narasapuram Lok Sabha constituency presently comprises the following Legislative Assembly segments:

#	Name	District	Member	Party	Leading (in 2024)
56	Achanta	West Godavari	Satyanarayana Pithani	TDP	BJP
57	Palakollu	West Godavari	Nimmala Ramanaidu	TDP	BJP
58	Narasapuram	West Godavari	Bommidi Narayana Nayakar	JSP	BJP
59	Bhimavaram	West Godavari	Pulaparthi Ramanjaneyulu (Anjibabu)	JSP	BJP
60	Undi	West Godavari	Kanumuru Raghu Rama Krishna Raju	TDP	BJP
61	Tanuku	West Godavari	Arimilli Radha Krishna	TDP	BJP
62	Tadepalligudem	West Godavari	Bolisetti Srinivas	JSP	BJP

== Members of Parliament ==
Year	Member	Party
1957	Uddaraju Ramam	Communist Party of India
1962	Datla Balaramaraju	Indian National Congress
1967	Datla Balaramaraju	Indian National Congress
1971	M. T. Raju	Indian National Congress
1977	Subhash Chandra Bose Alluri	Indian National Congress
1980	Subhash Chandra Bose Alluri	Indian National Congress (I)
1984	Bhupathiraju Vijayakumar Raju	Telugu Desam Party
1989	Bhupathiraju Vijayakumar Raju	Telugu Desam Party
1991	Bhupathiraju Vijayakumar Raju	Telugu Desam Party
1996	Kothapalli Subbarayudu	Telugu Desam Party
1998	Kanumuri Bapi Raju	Indian National Congress
1999	Krishnam Raju	Bharatiya Janata Party
2004	Chegondi Harirama Jogaiah	Indian National Congress
2009	Kanumuri Bapi Raju	Indian National Congress
2014	Gokaraju Ganga Raju	Bharatiya Janata Party
2019	Raghu Rama Krishna Raju	YSR Congress Party
2024	Bhupathi Raju Srinivasa Varma	Bharatiya Janata Party

== Election results ==
=== General Election 1989 ===
General Election, 1989: Narasapuram
Party	Candidate	Votes	%	±%
TDP	Bhupathiraju Vijayakumar Raju	334,215	50.31	−15.58
INC	Nachu Seshagiri Rao	320,413	48.23	+17.64
Majority		13,802	2.08	
Turnout		664,308	71.29	−0.30
TDP hold		Swing		

=== General Election 1991 ===
General Election, 1991: Narasapuram
Party	Candidate	Votes	%	±%
TDP	Bhupathiraju Vijayakumar Raju	317,703	51.93	+ 1.62
INC	Uppalapati Venkata Krishnam Raju	259,154	42.36	−5.87
Majority		58,549	9.57	
Turnout		611,748	65.53	−5.76
TDP hold		Swing		

=== General Election 1996 ===
General Election, 1996: Narasapuram
Party	Candidate	Votes	%	±%
TDP	Kothapalli Subbarayudu	304,536	42.91	−9.02
INC	Kanumuri Bapiraju	286,190	40.43	−1.97
NTRTDP(LP)	Kalidini Krishnam Raju	107,557	15.16	
Majority		17,626	2.48	
Turnout		709,640	69.53	+4.00
TDP hold		Swing		

=== General Election 1998 ===
General Election, 1998: Narasapuram
Party	Candidate	Votes	%	±%
INC	Kanumuri Bapiraju	368,630	50.66	+10.23
TDP	Kothapalli Subbarayudu	320,660	44.07	+1.16
Majority		47,970	6.59	
Turnout		727,594	71.86	+2.33
INC gain from TDP		Swing		

=== General Election 1999 ===
General Election, 1999: Narasapuram
Party	Candidate	Votes	%	±%
BJP	Uppalapati Venkata Krishnam Raju	421,099	59.78	
INC	Kanumuri Bapiraju	255,151	36.22	
Majority		165,948	23.56	
Turnout		704,453	69.04	−2.82
BJP gain from INC		Swing		

=== General Election 2004 ===
2004 Indian general elections: Narasapuram
Party	Candidate	Votes	%	±%
INC	Chegondi Venkata Harirama Jogaiah	402,761	52.41	+16.19
BJP	Uppalapati Venkata Krishnam Raju	338,349	44.02	−15.76
PPoI	Yugandhara Alluri Raju	27,427	3.57	
Majority		64,412	8.39	+31.95
Turnout		768,537	77.15	+8.11
INC gain from BJP		Swing		

=== General Election 2009 ===
2009 Indian general election: Narasapuram
Party	Candidate	Votes	%	±%
INC	Kanumuri Bapiraju	389,422	39.30	
TDP	Thota Sita Rama Lakshmi	274,732	27.72	
PRP	Gubbala Tammaiah	267,058	26.95	
LSP	Manorama Sanku	13,972	1.41	
BJP	Bhupathi Raju Srinivasa Varma	11,941	1.20	−42.82
Majority		114,690	11.58	
Turnout		990,960	84.47	
INC hold		Swing		

=== General Election 2014 ===
2014 Indian general election: Narasapuram
Party	Candidate	Votes	%	±%
BJP	Gokaraju Ganga Raju	540,306	49.61	+48.40
YSRCP	Vanka Ravindranath	454,955	41.77	+41.77
INC	Kanumuri Bapiraju	27,083	2.49	−36.81
Independent	Gitadas Das	23,260	2.14	+2.14
BSP	Chintapalli Kanaka Rao	8,491	0.78	−0.12
NOTA	None of the above	8,004	0.73	+0.73
Majority		85,351	7.84	−3.74
Turnout		108,8947	82.19	−2.28
BJP gain from INC		Swing		

=== General Election 2019 ===
2019 Indian general election: Narasapuram
Party	Candidate	Votes	%	±%
YSRCP	Raghu Rama Krishna Raju	447,594	38.11	
TDP	Vetukuri Venkata Siva Rama Raju	415,685	35.39	
JSP	Konidela Nagendra Babu	250,289	21.31	
INC	Kanumuri Bapiraju	13,810	1.18	
BJP	Pydikondala Manikyala Rao	12,378	1.05	−48.56
Majority		31,909	2.72	
Turnout		11,79,043	81.90	
Registered electors		14,39,691		
YSRCP gain from BJP		Swing		

=== General Election 2024 ===
2024 Indian general election: Narasapuram
Party	Candidate	Votes	%	±%
BJP	Bhupathi Raju Srinivasa Varma	707,343	57.46	▲56.41
YSRCP	Guduri Umabala	4,30,541	34.98	▼3.13
INC	K. B. R. Naidu	35,213	2.86	▲1.68
NOTA	None of the above	7,677	0.62	
Majority		2,76,802	22.48	▲19.76
Turnout		12,32,553	83.63	▲1.73
BJP gain from YSRCP		Swing		

== See also ==
- List of constituencies of the Andhra Pradesh Legislative Assembly
