= Kothapalli Subbarayudu =

Indian politician

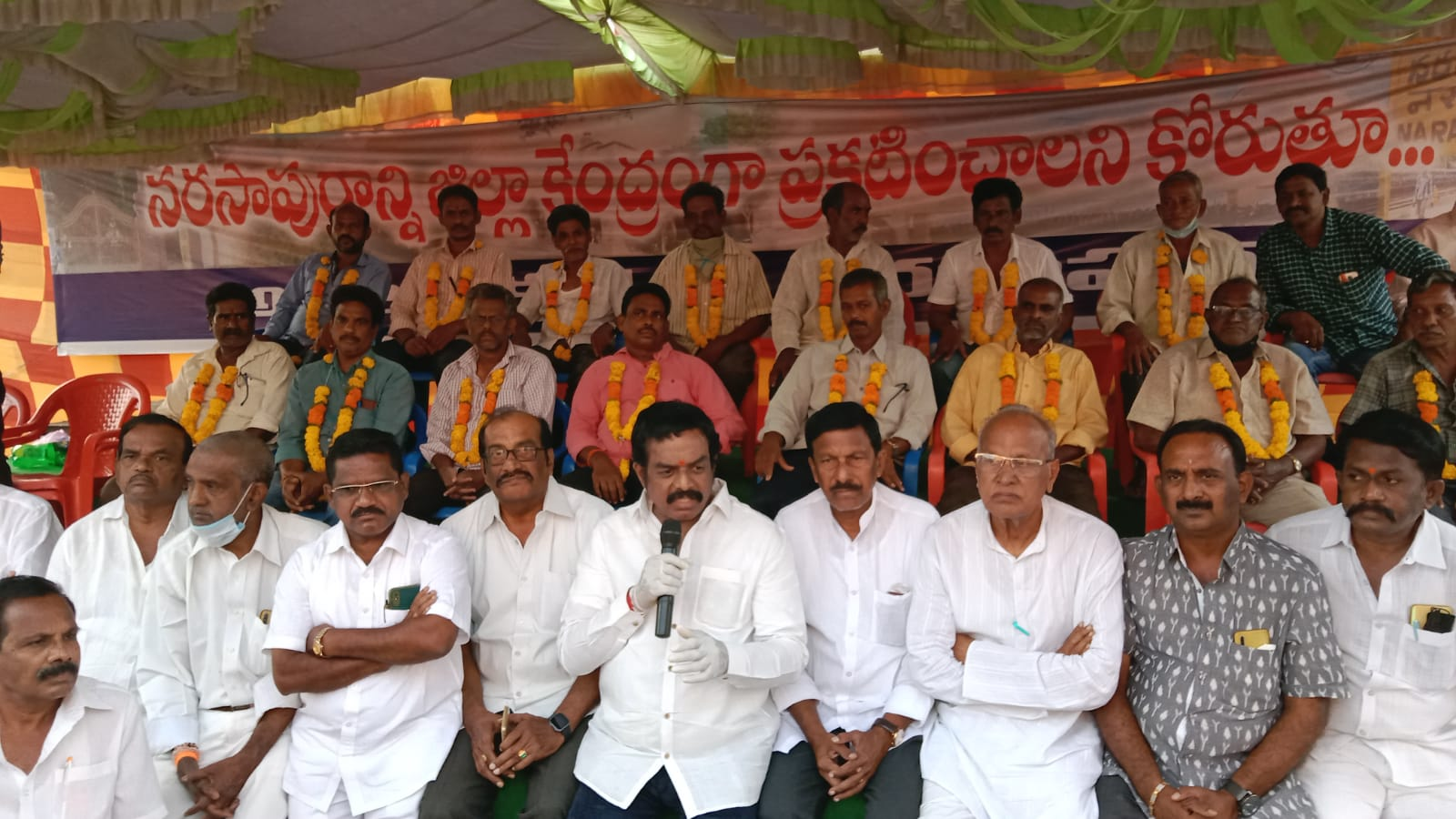
- At JAC

Member of Parliament, Lok Sabha
- In office 1996-1998
- Preceded by: Bhupathiraju Vijayakumar Raju
- Succeeded by: Kanumuri Bapiraju
- Constituency: Narasapuram

Member of Legislative Assembly Andhra Pradesh
- In office 2012–2014
- Preceded by: Mudunuri Prasad Raju
- Succeeded by: Bandaru Madhava Naidu
- Constituency: Narasapuram
- In office 1999–2009
- Preceded by: Mudunuri Prasad Raju
- Succeeded by: Mudunuri Prasad Raju
- Constituency: Narasapuram
- In office 1989–1996
- Preceded by: Chegondi Harirama Jogaiah
- Succeeded by: Mudunuri Prasad Raju
- Constituency: Narasapuram

Personal details
- Born: 24 August 1959 (age 66) Narasapur, West Godavari district, Andhra Pradesh
- Party: Jana Sena Party (2024-present)
- Other political affiliations: YSR Congress Party (2014-2016) (2019-2022); Indian National Congress (2011–2014); Praja Rajyam Party (2008–2011); Telugu Desam Party (1984-2008) (2016-2019)
- Spouse: Indira Priyadarshani

Kothapalli Subba Rayudu/Kothapalli Subbarayudu is an Indian politician, Janasena Party leader.

== Personal life ==
Rayudu was born at Narsapur of West Godavari district in Andhra Pradesh in 1959. He studied Intermediate at YNN College in Narsapur. He married Indira Priyadarshini in 1981.

== Political career ==
Subba Rayudu had started his political career as ward councilor.

24th Ward Narsapuram and got nominated as Vice Chairman - 1984 to 1989

He was inspired by N. T. Rama Rao for entering into politics.

He served as Minister for Andhra Pradesh Government twice.

State Minister for Housing Development - 1994 to 1995 (Government of Andhra Pradesh)

Cabinet Minister for Electricity Department - 1999 to 2004 (Government of Andhra Pradesh)

He represented as Member of Legislative Assembly from Narasapuram (Assembly constituency) in 1989, 1994, 1999 and 2004 from Telugu Desam Party.

Member of Legislative Assembly - 1989 to 1994 ( Telugu Desam Party)

Member of Legislative Assembly - 1994 to 1996 ( Telugu Desam Party)

In 1996, elected as Member of Parliament from Narasapuram, represented Lok Sabha, the lower house of India's Parliament, as a member of the Telugu Desam Party.

Member of Parliament - 1996 to 1997 ( Telugu Desam Party)

Member of Legislative Assembly - 1999 to 2004 ( Telugu Desam Party)

Member of Legislative Assembly - 2004 to 2009 ( Telugu Desam Party)

He joined Praja Rajyam Party due to his close association with Chiranjeevi who had floated new political party, later Indian National Congress Party. In 2012 when Praja Rajayam merged with Indian National Congress, in by election, he won for 5th time as Member of Legislative Assembly from Narasapuram (Assembly constituency).

Member of Legislative Assembly - 2010 to 2014 ( Indian National Congress Party)

Later he joined Telugu Desam Party and presided over Kapu Corporation.

Now he is member of YSRC Party.

== Association with NTR ==
Inspired by NTR welfare schemes Subba Rayudu had joined Telugu Desam Party. He is closely associated with NTR during the term NTR was in opposition. After NTR won the mandate to become chief minister Subba Rayudu took oath as the 9th Minister in 1994 on the same stage where NTR had taken oath.

== Association with Chiranjeevi ==
Subba Rayudu is close to Chiranjeevi from the days both of them started their careers in Politics and Film industry. Both belonging to same caste, Subba Rayudu had to join Chiranjeevi and support his political entry. Their close association is the main reason for Subba Rayudu leaving Telugu Desam Party.

== Association with YSR ==
Subba Rayudu had never worked with YSR but they have shared a close association that YSR always used to give utmost care for Subba Rayudu and offered him good position in YSR government and congress party. However, Subba Rayudu stayed with Telugu Desam party softly rejecting the offers.
