= Bhupathiraju =

Bhupathiraju is a given name. People with the given name include:

- Bhupathiraju Somaraju
- Bhupathiraju Vijayakumar Raju
- Bhupathi Raju Srinivasa Varma
