= Jogaiah =

Jogaiah or Jogayya may refer to:

- Jogayya, a 2011 Kannada film
- Chegondi Venkata Harirama Jogaiah (born 1937), Indian Parliamentarian
- V. V. Jogayya Pantulu, father of V. V. Giri
