= Department of Water Resources Development (Andhra Pradesh) =

Minister of Water Resources Development
- Jalavanarula Abhivr̥d'dhi Śākha Mantrī
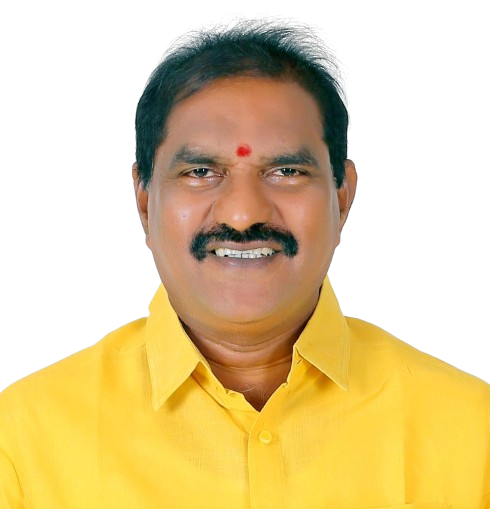
- Incumbent; Nimmala Rama Naidu since 12 June 2024
- Department of Water Resources Development
- Member of: Andha Pradesh Cabinet
- Reports to: Governor of Andhra Pradesh; Chief Minister of Andhra Pradesh; Andhra Pradesh Legislature
- Appointer: Governor of Andhra Pradesh on the advice of the chief minister of Andhra Pradesh
- Inaugural holder: Devineni Uma Maheswara Rao
- Formation: 8 June 2014
- Website: Official website

The Minister of Water Resources Development or Irrigation Minister, officially Minister of Water Resources Development, is the head of the Department of Water Resources Development of the Government of Andhra Pradesh.

From June 2014 to May 2019, following the bifurcation of United Andhra Pradesh into the present-day residual Andhra Pradesh and Telangana, the Irrigation Minister of Andhra Pradesh was Devineni Uma Maheswara Rao of the Telugu Desam Party. Following the cabinet formation on 12 June 2024, Nimmala Rama Naidu assumed the office under the Chief Ministership of N. Chandrababu Naidu.

== List of ministers ==
#	Portrait	Minister (Lifespan) Constituency	Term of office			Election (Term)	Party	Ministry	Chief Minister	Ref.
#	Portrait	Minister (Lifespan) Constituency	Term start	Term end	Duration	Election (Term)	Party	Ministry	Chief Minister	Ref.
1		Devineni Uma Maheswara Rao (born 1962); MLA for Mylavaram	8 June 2014	29 May 2019	4 years, 355 days	2014 (14th)	Telugu Desam Party	Naidu III	N. Chandrababu Naidu	
2		Anil Kumar Poluboina (born 1980); MLA for Nellore City	8 June 2019	7 April 2022	2 years, 303 days	2019 (15th)	YSR Congress Party	Jagan	Y. S. Jagan Mohan Reddy	
3		Ambati Rambabu MLA for Sattenapalle	11 April 2022	8 June 2024	2 years, 58 days	2019 (15th)	YSR Congress Party	Jagan	Y. S. Jagan Mohan Reddy	
4		Nimmala Rama Naidu (born 1968); MLA for Palakollu	12 June 2024	Incumbent	2 years, 87 days	2024 (16th)	Telugu Desam Party	Naidu IV	N. Chandrababu Naidu	
