= Gokaraju Rangaraju Institute of Engineering and Technology =

College in Hyderabad, Telangana, India

- Type: Private
- Established: 1997
- Founder: Gokaraju Ganga Raju
- Accreditation: NAAC, NBA, SIRO
- Affiliations: Jawaharlal Nehru Technological University, Hyderabad, UGC
- Academic affiliations: SIRO
- Chairman: Gokaraju Ganga Raju
- Vice-president: G.V.K. Ganga Raju
- Principal: Praveen Jugge
- Director: Jandayala Narayana Murthy
- Faculty: 315
- Undergraduates: 5259 (AY 2020-21)
- Postgraduates: 167 (AY 2020-21)
- Location: Nizampet Road, Krishnaja Hills, Bachupally, Hyderabad 500090, Telangana, India; 17.5203479°N 78.3665555°E
- Campus: Rural, spread over 24 acres (0.097 km^{2}) in Bachupally Village
- Website: www.griet.ac.in
- Location within Hyderabad Location within Telangana Location within India

Gokaraju Rangaraju Institute of Engineering and Technology (GRIET) is a private engineering college located in Bachupally, Hyderabad, Telangana, India. The college is affiliated to Jawaharlal Nehru Technological University, Hyderabad as a UGC autonomous institute.

== History ==
Gokaraju Rangaraju Institute of Engineering and Technology was established in 1979 as a part of Gokaraju Rangaraju Educational Society (GRES) by Gokaraju Ganga Raju.

== Campus ==
The GRIET Campus is spread over an area of 24 acres of sprawling lush green nature atop a hill. GRIET shares the campus with Gokaraju Lailavati Engineering College, Gokaraju Rangaraju College of Pharmacy and Ganges Valley School. GRIET is around 4 km from JNTU College Metro Station and is accessible using both public and private transport.

=== Hostels ===
GRIET has a dedicated girls hostel for students outside the main campus area, though there also are multiple private hostels nearby within a walking distance from the campus.

== Organization and Administration ==
=== Governing Body ===
GRIET is headed by a Governing Body which made up of the Chairperson, trustees of Gokaraju Rangaraju Educational Society, faculty members, prominent educationalists and industrialists as well as nominees from UGC, the State Government and JNTUH.

=== Academic Council ===
The Academic Council Committee of GRIET sits below the governing body and consists of the Principal, University Nominees from JNTUH, the various heads of departments, external experts and senior faculty. The Academic Council is primarily responsible for supervising the academic work of the institute and approve various proposals pertaining to academic regulations and curriculum.

=== Departments ===
The college has nine academic departments, each overseen by a Head-of-Department (HOD).

Academic Department	Head of Department
Computer Science Engineering	Dr. B Sankara Babu
Electronics and Communications Engineering	Dr. K Jamal
Information Technology	Dr. Y Jeevan Nagendra Kumar
Artificial Intelligence	Dr. G Karuna
Data Science	Dr. S Govinda Rao
Electrical and Electronics Engineering	Dr. P Srividya Devi
Mechanical Engineering	Dr. B Ch Nookaraju
Civil Engineering	Dr. T Srinivas
Humanities and Sciences	Dr. G Patrick

GRIET also 21 different deans in various positions, each of whom are responsible for various institutional functions.

Position	Name of the Dean
Controller of Examinations	Dr. M Kiran
Academic Affairs	Dr. K Prasanna Lakshmi
Research & Consultancy	Dr. Swadish Kumar Singh
Assessment & Accreditation	Prof. P Gopala Krishna
Student Affairs	Dr. A Vinay Kumar
Mentor Coordination	Dr. VN Rama Devi
Training & Placements	Dr. K Butchi Raju
Discipline	Dr. Y Rama Krishna Prasad
Admissions	Dr. B.Ch.Nookaraju
Faculty Development Programs	Dr. Hima Bindu Valiveti
Advanced Academic Centre	Dr. M Kiran Kumar
Finishing School	Dr. J Sridevi
Technology and Innovative Cell	Dr. V Rama Sundari
Green Campus & Outreach	Dr. T Padma
ICT	Dr. K Madhavi
Postgraduate Studies	Dr. T Srinivas
Interships	Dr. GS Bapiraju
IQAC	Dr. C Lavanya
Alumni Affairs	Dr. T Jagannadha Swamy
Higher Studies & Competetive Exams	Dr. N Rajashekar
Skill Plus	Dr. P Sri Vidya Devi

== Academics ==
GRIET offers undergraduate and postgraduate programs in a variety of engineering streams.

University rankings

Engineering – India
- NIRF (2021): 165
- NIRF (2022): 148
- Outlook India (2024): 54

=== Undergraduate Programs (B.Tech) ===
1. Electronics and Communication Engineering
2. Electrical and Electronics Engineering
3. Computer Science and Engineering
4. Mechanical Engineering
5. Civil Engineering
6. Computer Science and Business System
7. CSE (Artificial Intelligence and Machine Learning)
8. CSE (Data Science)

=== Postgraduate Programs (M.Tech) ===
1. Computer Science and Engineering
2. Structural Engineering

== Admissions ==
All admissions into GRIET are primarily undertaken through two avenues:

- 70% of all seats are allotted based on student merit in an entrance examination.
- 30% of all seats are earmarked for students entering through management/NRI categories.

For undergraduate merit seats, TG EAPCET is considered as the default entrance examination, while an additional 10% of seats are allotted in the second-year for students who have taken the TG ECET.

For postgraduate students, GATE and TG PGCET are considered the qualifying examinations, with GATE applicants being given preference.

== See also ==
- Education in India
- Literacy in India
- List of institutions of higher education in Telangana
