= Mantena Rama Raju =

Indian politician

Mantena Ramaraju

Member of the 15th Andhra Pradesh Assembly for Undi Assembly constituency 5 Years
- In office 2019–2024
- Preceded by: Vetukuri Venkata Siva Rama Raju
- Succeeded by: Raghu Rama Krishna Raju

Personal details
- Born: Kalavapudi Rambabu; 13 February 1977 (age 49) Kalavapudi, Andhra Pradesh
- Party: Telugu Desam Party
- Spouse: Smt. Mantena Sushma
- Children: Mmm Raju, Mantena Jeswanth Varma.
- Parent(s): Mantena Chinna Venkata Raju, Mantena Suryakantam.
- Education: Andhra University

Mantena Rama Raju is the chairman of the Andhra Pradesh Industrial Infrastructure Corporation (APIIC) in 2024 appointed by chief minister Sri Nara Chandra Babu Naidu and he was the Member of the Legislative Assembly in 15th Andhra Pradesh Assembly from Undi Assembly constituency from 2019 to 2024, representing Telugu Desam Party. He is very popular by distributing Annadaya medicine across various parts of Andhra Pradesh.
