= Ramanaidu =

Ramanaidu or Rama Naidu is an Indian given name that may refer to the following notable people:

- D. Ramanaidu (1936–2015), Indian film producer and founder of Suresh Productions
- Edmund Santhara Kumar Ramanaidu, Malaysian politician, businessman, and entrepreneur
- Nimmala Rama Naidu (born 1969), Indian politician
