= Bhimavaram Assembly constituency =

Constituency of the Andhra Pradesh Legislative Assembly, India

Coordinates: 16.54°N 81.52°E

Bhimavaram
- Constituency No. 59 for the Andhra Pradesh Legislative Assembly
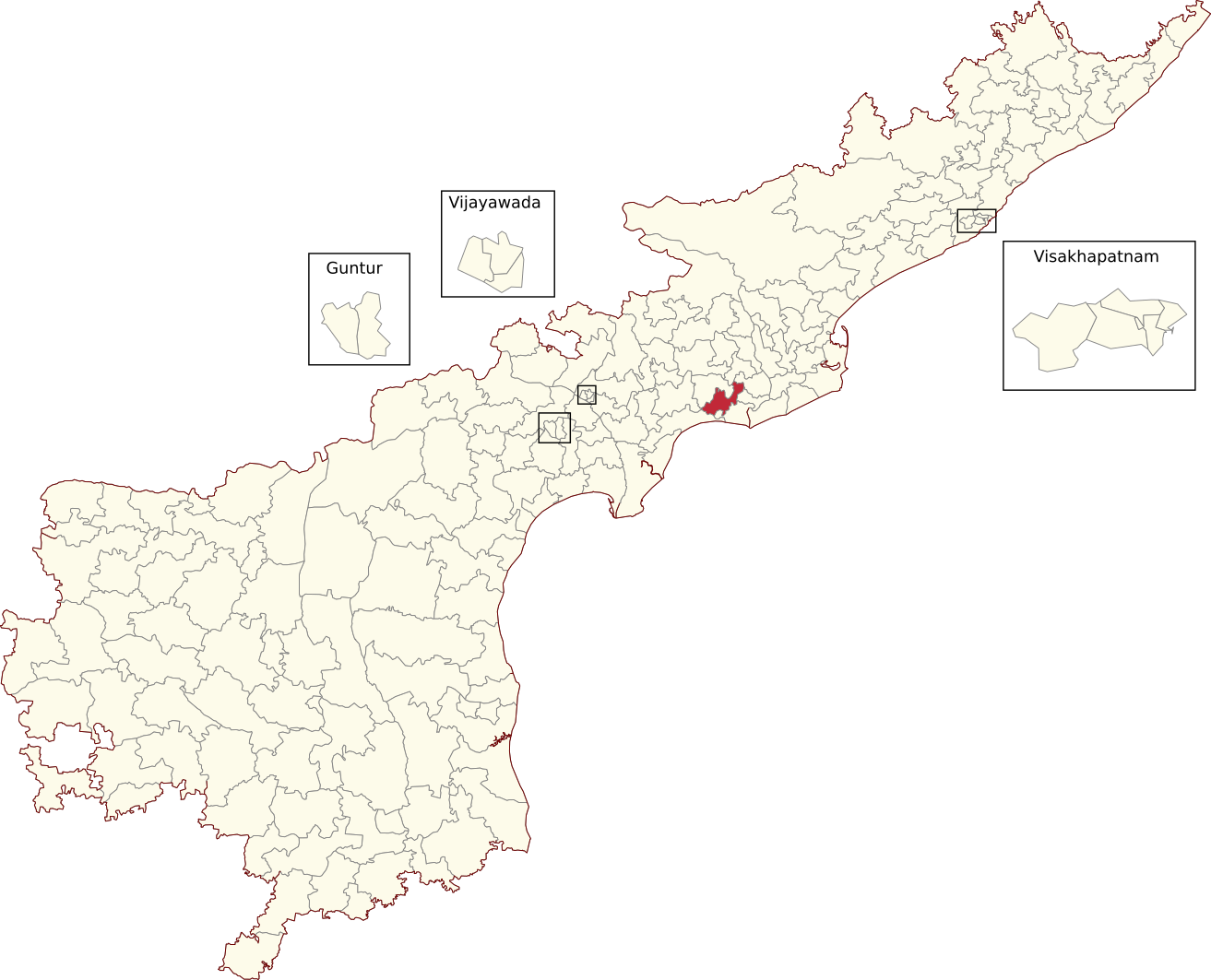
- Location of Bhimavaram Assembly constituency within Andhra Pradesh

Constituency details
- Country: India
- Region: South India
- State: Andhra Pradesh
- District: West Godavari
- Lok Sabha constituency: Narasapuram
- Established: 1951
- Total electors: 246,342
- Reservation: None

Member of Legislative Assembly
- 16th Andhra Pradesh Legislative Assembly
- Incumbent Pulaparthi Ramanjaneyulu
- Party: JSP
- Alliance: NDA
- Elected year: 2024

Bhimavaram is a constituency in West Godavari district of Andhra Pradesh that elects representatives to the Andhra Pradesh Legislative Assembly in India. It is one of the seven assembly segments of Narasapuram Lok Sabha constituency.

Ramanjaneyulu Pulaparthi is the current MLA of the constituency, having won the 2024 Andhra Pradesh Legislative Assembly election from Janasena Party. As of 2024, there are a total of 246,342 electors in the constituency. The constituency was established in 1951, as per the Delimitation Orders (1951).

== Mandals ==
The mandals and wards that form the assembly constituency are:

| S.No | Mandal | Wards |
|---|---|---|
| 1 | Bhimavaram mandal | (Bhimavaram (M+OG), Bhimavaram (M) – Ward No. 1 to 27, China-Amiram (OG) (Part) – Ward No. 28, Rayalam (R) (OG) (Part) – Ward No. 29) |
| 2 | Veeravasaram | – |

== Members of the Legislative Assembly ==
| Year | Member | Political party |
|---|---|---|
| 1952 | Bhupathiraju Subbaraju | Kisan Mazdoor Praja Party |
| 1955 | Nachu Venkata Ramaiah | Indian National Congress |
| 1962 | Nachu Venkata Ramaiah | Indian National Congress |
| 1967 | Bhupathiraju Vijayakumar Raju | Independent |
| 1972 | Bhupathiraju Vijayakumar Raju | Indian National Congress |
| 1978 | Kalidindi Vijayayanarasimha Raju | Indian National Congress |
| 1983 | Penumatsa Venkata Narasimha Raju | Telugu Desam Party |
| 1985 | Penumatsa Venkata Narasimha Raju | Telugu Desam Party |
| 1989 | Alluri Subhash Chandra Bose | Indian National Congress |
| 1994 | Penumatsa Venkata Narasimha Raju | Telugu Desam Party |
| 1995 by-election | Penumatsa Venkata Narasimha Raju | Telugu Desam Party |
| 1999 | Penumatsa Venkata Narasimha Raju | Telugu Desam Party |
| 2004 | Grandhi Srinivas | Indian National Congress |
| 2009 | Pulaparthi Ramanjaneyulu | Indian National Congress |
| 2014 | Pulaparthi Ramanjaneyulu | Telugu Desam Party |
| 2019 | Grandhi Srinivas | YSR Congress Party |
| 2024 | Pulaparthi Ramanjaneyulu | Jana Sena Party |

== Election results ==
=== 1952 ===
1952 Madras Legislative Assembly election: Bhimavaram
| Party | Candidate | Votes | % | ±% |
|---|---|---|---|---|
| KMPP | Bhupathiraju Subbaraju | 33,743 | 71.24% | |
| INC | Nimmda Sangaiah | 9,595 | 20.26% | 20.26% |
| Socialist Party (India) | Pidakala Satyanandam | 4,028 | 8.50% | |
| Margin of victory | | 24,148 | 50.98% | |
| Turnout | | 47,366 | 72.80% | |
| Registered electors | | 65,063 | | |
| KMPP win (new seat) | | | | |

=== 1999 ===
1999 Andhra Pradesh Legislative Assembly election: Bhimavaram
| Party | Candidate | Votes | % | ±% |
|---|---|---|---|---|
| TDP | Venkata Penumatsa | 71,502 | 62.39 | +9.36 |
| INC | Vegiraju Raju | 39,648 | 34.59 | −11.58 |
| CPI(M) | B. Bala Ram | 1,946 | 1.70 | |
| BSP | Estheru Muvvala | 763 | 0.67 | +0.50 |
| Anna Telugu Desam Party | Satya Nallam | 456 | 0.40 | +0.50 |
| Ajeya Bharat Party | Swamy Kandregula | 155 | 0.14 | |
| Independent | Kotteti Rao | 138 | 0.12 | |
| Majority | | 41,854 | 27.80 | +20.94 |
| Turnout | | 71,502 | 62.39 | +9.36 |
| TDP hold | | Swing | | |

=== 2004 ===
2004 Andhra Pradesh Legislative Assembly election: Bhimavaram
| Party | Candidate | Votes | % | ±% |
|---|---|---|---|---|
| INC | Grandhi Srinivas | 63,939 | 51.03 | +16.44 |
| TDP | Venkata Narasimha Raju Penumatsa | 56,034 | 44.72 | −17.67 |
| Majority | | 7,905 | 6.31 | |
| Turnout | | 125,302 | 72.74 | +8.16 |
| INC gain from TDP | | Swing | | |

=== 2009 ===
2009 Andhra Pradesh Legislative Assembly election: Bhimavaram
| Party | Candidate | Votes | % | ±% |
|---|---|---|---|---|
| INC | Ramanjaneyulu Pulaparthi (Anjibabu) | 63,862 | 40.40 | −10.63 |
| PRP | Vegesna Suryanarayana Raju | 41,763 | 26.42 | |
| TDP | Gadiraju Satyanarayana Raju @ Babu | 39,818 | 25,19 | −19.53 |
| Majority | | 22,099 | 13.98 | |
| Turnout | | 158,071 | 81.28 | +8.54 |
| INC hold | | Swing | | |

=== 2014 ===
2014 Andhra Pradesh Legislative Assembly election: Bhimavaram
| Party | Candidate | Votes | % | ±% |
|---|---|---|---|---|
| TDP | Ramanjaneyulu Pulaparthi (Anjibabu) | 90,772 | 51.61 | |
| YSRCP | Grandhi Srinivas | 77,046 | 43.81 | |
| Majority | | 13,726 | 7.80 | |
| Turnout | | 175,871 | 77.94 | −3.34 |
| TDP gain from INC | | Swing | | |

=== 2019 ===
2019 Andhra Pradesh Legislative Assembly election: Bhimavaram
| Party | Candidate | Votes | % | ±% |
|---|---|---|---|---|
| YSRCP | Grandhi Srinivas | 70,642 | 36.78 | −7.03 |
| JSP | Pawan Kalyan | 62,285 | 32.33 | +28.14 |
| TDP | Ramanjaneyulu Pulaparthi (Anjibabu) | 54,036 | 28.14 | −23.47 |
| Majority | | 8,357 | 4.35 | |
| Turnout | | 192,061 | 77.94 | +0.00 |
| YSRCP gain from TDP | | Swing | | |

=== 2024 ===
2024 Andhra Pradesh Legislative Assembly election: Bhimavaram
| Party | Candidate | Votes | % | ±% |
|---|---|---|---|---|
| JSP | Ramanjaneyulu Pulaparthi (Anjibabu) | 130,424 | 63.94 | |
| YSRCP | Grandhi Srinivas | 63,450 | 31.11 | |
| INC | Ankem Seetaramu | 3,252 | 1.59 | |
| NOTA | None Of The Above | 1,210 | 0.59 | |
| Jaibhim Rao Bharat Party | BASWANI PAVAN KUMAR | 575 | 0.28 | |
| Majority | | 66,974 | 32.83 | |
| Turnout | | 2,03,983 | | |
| JSP gain from YSRCP | | Swing | | |

== See also ==
- List of constituencies of the Andhra Pradesh Legislative Assembly
