= Mentay Padmanabham =

Indian politician

Member of Parliament, Rajya Sabha
- In office September 13, 1989 – April 2, 1994
- Constituency: Andhra Pradesh

Personal details
- Born: 2 April 1934
- Party: Telugu Desam
- Spouse: Udayani Bhaskaram
- Children: 5; 2 sons and 3 daughters

Mentay Padmanabham (born 1934) was an Indian politician. He was a Member of Parliament representing Andhra Pradesh in the Rajya Sabha the upper house of India's Parliament as member of the Telugu Desam Party. He was also the Joint Secretary of Socialist Party, Andhra Pradesh, between 1957 and 1958. He was the General Secretary, Janata Party after the Indian Emergency between 1977 and 1980.

In 1999 Andhra Pradesh Assembly elections, he has contested as a candidate of Indian National Congress from Palakollu and lost by a margin of about 12,000 votes.

== Legacy ==
Mentey Padmanabham College of Engineering and Technology was established in 2008. It was founded in the name of parliamentarian by Bhimavaram Education Society at Bhimavaram.
