= Allu Venkata Satyanarayana =

Indian politician

Member of the Legislative Assembly Andhra Pradesh
- In office 1994–2004
- Preceded by: Chegondi Venkata Harirama Jogaiah
- Succeeded by: Ch. Satyanarayana Murty (Dr.Babjee)
- Constituency: Palakollu
- In office 1983–1989
- Preceded by: Vardhineedi Satyanarayana
- Succeeded by: Chegondi Venkata Harirama Jogaiah
- Constituency: Palakollu

Personal details
- Born: 2 January 1940 (age 86) Palakollu, Andhra Pradesh
- Party: Telugu Desam Party (1982–2004); Praja Rajyam Party (2008–2011); YSR Congress Party (2012–2014)

Allu Venkata Satyanarayana was a 4-time MLA from Palakol. He contested as the Telugu Desam Party MLA candidate in 1983, 1985, 1989, 1994, 1999 and won in 1983, 1985, 1994, 1999 but lost in 1989 elections. He is the longest serving MLA of 17 years (4 terms) from Palakollu assembly constituency.

== Political career ==
=== Early career ===
He started his political career in Communist Party of India (Marxist) as Bala sangam leader. Later he resigned and was elected as Ward Councillor independently in 1981 and continued as councillor until 1987.

=== Praja Rajyam Party ===
He joined Praja Rajyam Party and continued in party until it merged with Congress.

=== YSR Congress Party ===
He joined YSR Congress Party.

=== Other posts ===
He worked as Andhra Pradesh Agro based industries chairman in 1988 and Assembly text books committee chairman in 1999.
