= Gokaraju Ganga Raju =

Indian politician

Member of parliament Lok Sabha
- In office 16 May 2014 – 23 May 2019
- Preceded by: Kanumuri Bapi Raju
- Succeeded by: Kanumuru Raghu Rama Krishna Raju
- Constituency: Narsapuram

Personal details
- Born: 14 June 1948 (age 78) Kesavaram, West Godavari district, Andhra Pradesh, Dominion of India
- Party: Bharatiya Janata Party
- Spouse: Lailavathi
- Children: G V K Ranga Raju, G Rama Raju & 1 Daughter
- Education: Andhra University
- As of May, 2014

Gokaraju Ganga Raju is an Indian politician and a Member of Parliament to the 16th Lok Sabha from Narsapuram (Lok Sabha constituency), Andhra Pradesh. He won the 2014 Indian general election being a Bharatiya Janata Party candidate. He is also the founder of Laila Group of Companies. Recently, he was elected as vice-president to Board of Control for Cricket in India (BCCI) South Zone.

His father, Late Sri Gokaraju Ranga Raju, served as an MLA from Undi constituency, ZP Vice Chairman of West Godavari District and also served as the Chairman of Board of trustees of TTD twice.

Dr. Ganga Raju is the Secretary of Andhra Cricket Association, Chairman of Financial Committee of BCCI and also the Member of Governing Council of Indian Premier League run by BCCI. Recently, Raju was elected as vice-president to Board of Control for Cricket in India (BCCI).
