= Subhash Chandra Bose Alluri =

Indian politician

Subhash Chandra Bose Alluri అల్లూరి సుభాష్ చంద్రబోస్

Member of Parliament, Lok Sabha
- In office 1977-1984
- Preceded by: M. T. Raju
- Succeeded by: Bhupathiraju Vijayakumar Raju
- Constituency: Narasapur

Member of Legislative Assembly Andhra Pradesh
- In office 1989-1994
- Preceded by: Venkata Narasimha Raju Penmetsa
- Succeeded by: Venkata Narasimha Raju Penmetsa
- Constituency: Bhimavaram

Personal details
- Born: 23 January 1940 (age 86) Junnuru, West Godavari district, Madras Presidency, British India (Presently Andhra Pradesh, India)
- Party: Indian National Congress
- Spouse: Alluri Bharati
- Children: 2
- Education: Krishna University
- As of Apr, 2018

Subhash Chandra Bose Alluri is an Indian politician and a Member of Parliament to the 6th and 7th Lok Sabha from Narsapuram (Lok Sabha constituency), Andhra Pradesh.
