= M. T. Raju =

Indian politician

Member of Parliament, Lok Sabha
- In office 1971-1977
- Preceded by: Datla Balaramaraju
- Succeeded by: Alluri Subhash Chandra Bose
- Constituency: Narasapuram

Personal details
- Born: 5 October 1911 West Godavari district, Madras Presidency, British India (presently Andhra Pradesh, India)
- Party: Indian National Congress
- Spouse: Ranganayakamma

M. T. Raju was an Indian politician. He was a Member of Parliament, representing Narasapuram in the Lok Sabha, the lower house of India's Parliament, as a member of the Indian National Congress.
