= Uddaraju Ramam =

Member of Parliament, Lok Sabha
- In office 1957-1962
- Preceded by: Addepally Satyanarayana Murthy
- Succeeded by: Datla Balaramaraju
- Constituency: Narasapuram

Personal details
- Born: Uddaraju Ramam; 20 January 1912 Valamarru Village, Narasapuram, Madras Presidency, British India (now Andhra State) India
- Died: 27 November 1994 (aged 82) Hyderabad, Andhra Pradesh, (now Telangana) India
- Party: Communist Party of India (Marxist)
- Spouse: Uddaraju Manikyamba (1914 - 2007)

Uddaraju Ramam (1912 in Narasapuram – 27 November 1994 in Ramamohan) was an Indian politician. He was a parliamentarian and a leader of peasants movement. He has three sons and two daughters,

== In the Indian National Congress ==
Ramam was the son of Peda Padmaraju. He studied at Vinayasraman in Guntur. At the age of 18, he joined the Indian National Congress and took part in the Salt Satyagraha. He went to Calcutta for the 1933 Congress session, and was jailed there. The following year, he became a member of the Congress Socialist Party. He went on to becoming president of the Narsapur Taluk Congress Committee and organising secretary of the District Congress Committee. Raman took part in building the Communist Party of India in West Godavari. He served as the secretary of the District Committee of the party between 1935 and 1951. In 1937 he became a member of the Provincial Congress Committee.

== Parliamentarian ==
In 1952 he became a Secretariat member of the Andhra Provincial Committee of the Communist Party. Ramam was elected to the Lok Sabha (lower house of the parliament of India) in the 1957 general election. He stood as the CPI candidate in Narsapur constituency, obtaining 134,119 votes (51.58% of the votes in the constituency).

Ramam lost the Narsapur seat in the 1962 general election. He finished in second place with 167,209 votes (46%).

== CPI(M) leader ==
When CPI went through a split, Ramam sided with the Communist Party of India (Marxist). He was a member of the Andhra Pradesh State Committee and its secretariat for many years, until he retired from political work due to old age. He contested the 1967 general election as the CPI(M) candidate in Narsapur, finishing in second place with 148,721 votes (35.76%).

In the 1971 general election he again finished in second place in Narsapur, with 92,601 votes (23.56%). Likewise, in the 1977 general election he finished in second place with 142,162 votes (30.84%). Again in the 1980 general election he finished in second place with 114,156 votes (25.82%).

== Kisan sabha ==
He leader of the peasants movement, he served as an Executive Committee member of the Andhra Rashtra Ryots Sangham for a long period. In 1952 he became the treasurer of the organisation. He also served as secretary of the Sabari Project Ryots Association. He had collected and published lectures of Sir Arthur Cotton on the subject of Irrigation works in India namely Lectures on Irrigation works in India. He served as president of the All India Kisan Sabha.
