= Narasapuram Assembly constituency =

Constituency of the Andhra Pradesh Legislative Assembly, India

Coordinates: 17.17°N 81.86°E

Narasapuram
- Constituency No. 58 for the Andhra Pradesh Legislative Assembly
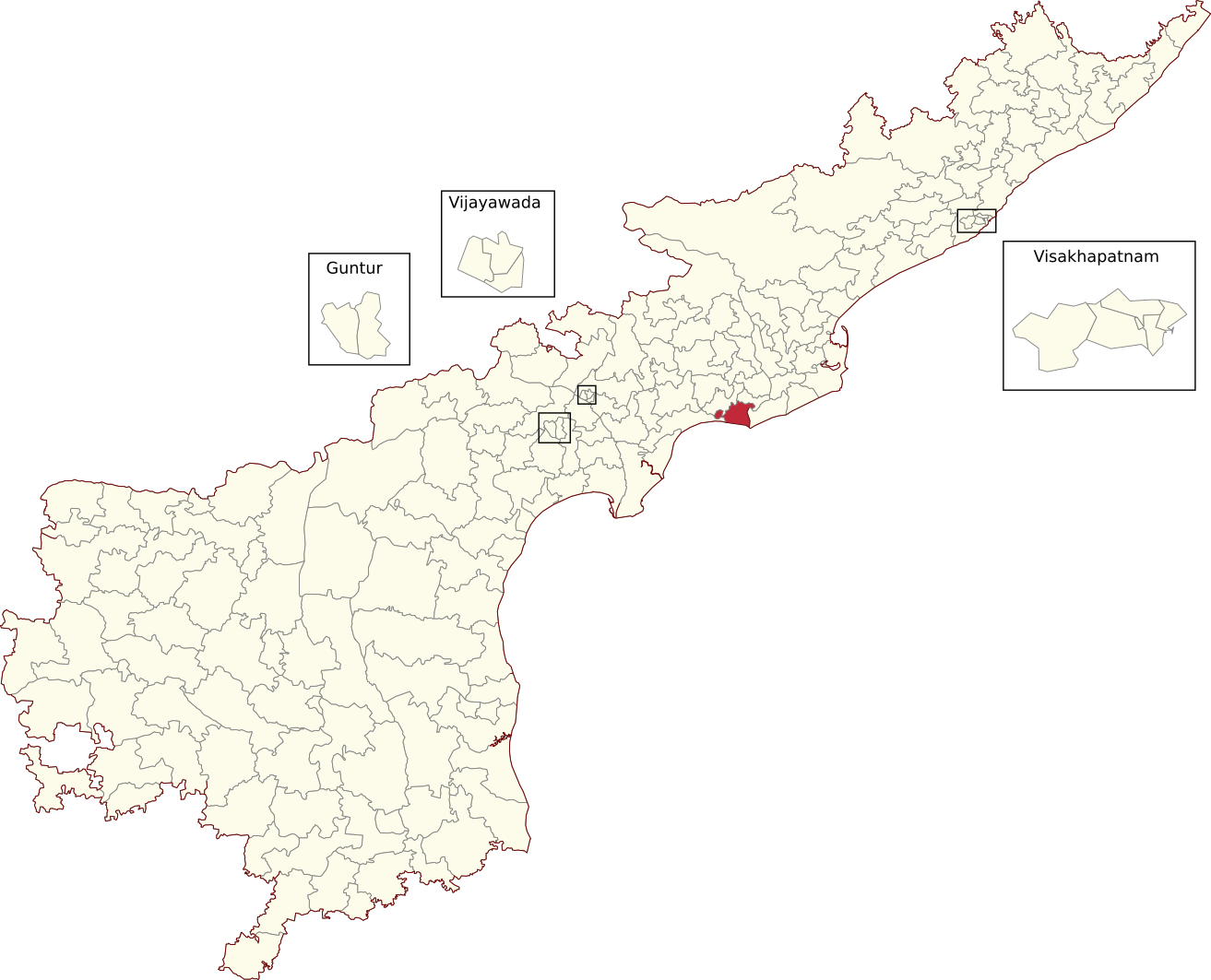
- Location of Narasapuram Assembly constituency within Andhra Pradesh

Constituency details
- Country: India
- Region: South India
- State: Andhra Pradesh
- District: West Godavari
- Lok Sabha constituency: Narasapuram
- Established: 1951
- Total electors: 168,122
- Reservation: None

Member of Legislative Assembly
- 16th Andhra Pradesh Legislative Assembly
- Incumbent Bommidi Narayana Nayakar
- Party: JSP
- Alliance: NDA
- Elected year: 2024

Narasapuram Assembly constituency is a constituency in West Godavari district of Andhra Pradesh that elects representatives to the Andhra Pradesh Legislative Assembly in India. It is one of the seven assembly segments of Narasapuram Lok Sabha constituency.

Bommidi Narayana Nayakar is the current MLA of the constituency, having won the 2024 Andhra Pradesh Legislative Assembly election from Janasena Party. As of 2019, there are a total of 168,122 electors in the constituency. The constituency was established in 1951, as per the Delimitation Orders (1951).

== Mandals ==
The two mandals that form the assembly constituency are:

Mandal
Mogalthur
Narsapuram

== Members of the Legislative Assembly ==
| Year | Member | Political party |
|---|---|---|
| 1952 | Padela Symasundara Rao | Communist Party of India |
| 1952 | Bhupathiraju Lakshminarasaraju | Communist Party of India |
| 1955 | Grandhi Venkatareddi | Indian National Congress |
| 1962 | Parakala Seshavatharam | Indian National Congress |
| 1967 | S. R. Rudraraju | Communist Party of India (Marxist) |
| 1972 | Parakala Seshavatharam | Indian National Congress |
| 1978 | Parakala Seshavatharam | Indian National Congress |
| 1981^ | Parakala Kalikamba | Indian National Congress |
| 1983 | Chegondi Venkata Harirama Jogaiah | Telugu Desam Party |
| 1985 | Chegondi Venkata Harirama Jogaiah | Telugu Desam Party |
| 1989 | Kothapalli Subbarayudu | Telugu Desam Party |
| 1994 | Kothapalli Subbarayudu | Telugu Desam Party |
| 1999 | Kothapalli Subbarayudu | Telugu Desam Party |
| 2004 | Kothapalli Subbarayudu | Telugu Desam Party |
| 2009 | Mudunuri Prasad Raju | Indian National Congress |
| 2012 | Kothapalli Subbarayudu | Indian National Congress |
| 2014 | Bandaru Madhava Naidu | Telugu Desam Party |
| 2019 | Mudunuri Prasad Raju | YSR Congress Party |
| 2024 | Bommidi Narayana Nayakar | Janasena Party |

== Election results ==
=== 1952 ===
1952 Madras Legislative Assembly election: Narsapur
| Party | Candidate | Votes | % | ±% |
|---|---|---|---|---|
| CPI | Padela Symasundara Rao | 89,557 | 33.11 | |
| CPI | Bhupathiraju Lakshminarasaraju | 50,746 | 18.76 | |
| KMPP | Gottumakkala Venkanna | 28,318 | 10.47 | |
| INC | Dasari Perumallu | 27,512 | 10.17 | 10.17 |
| INC | Alluri Satyanarayaraju | 27,016 | 9.99 | 9.99 |
| KMPP | Grandhi Venkatareddi Naiudu | 26,894 | 9.94 | |
| RPI | Ganta Aruna Kumar | 9,174 | 3.39 | |
| Socialist Party (India) | Indukuri Chinna Satyaraghavaraju | 5,550 | 2.05 | |
| Independent | Pilli Charles | 2,420 | 0.89 | |
| Independent | Kumara Lakshmi Narasimharaju Bahadur | 1,831 | 0.68 | |
| Margin of victory | | 38,811 | 14.35 | |
| Turnout | | 2,70,462 | 176.47 | |
| Registered electors | | 1,53,263 | | |
| CPI win (new seat) | | | | |

=== 1994 ===
1994 Andhra Pradesh Legislative Assembly election: Narasapur
| Party | Candidate | Votes | % | ±% |
|---|---|---|---|---|
| TDP | Kothapalli Subbarayudu | 62,693 | 55.6 | ▲0.6 |
| INC | Prabhakar Parakala | 47,246 | 41.9 | ▼0.3 |
| BSP | Revu Eswararao | 1,024 | 0.9 | |
| BJP | Mocherla Rajaram | 597 | 0.5 | ▼0.2 |
| Independent | Chenna Venkataramaiah | 395 | 0.4 | |
| Independent | Gannabattula Satyanarayana | 248 | 0.2 | |
| Marxist Communist Party Of India (SRIVASTAVA) | Bonam Venkatanarasimharao | 246 | 0.2 | |
| Independent | Thota Surya Prakasarao | 204 | 0.2 | |
| Independent | Villuri Padmakumari | 86 | 0.1 | |
| Margin of victory | | 15,447 | 13.5 | ▲1 |
| Turnout | | 114,377 | 77 | ▲2.1 |
| Registered electors | | 148,471 | | ▲7,432 |
| TDP hold | | Swing | | |

=== 1999 ===
1999 Andhra Pradesh Legislative Assembly election: Narasapur
| Party | Candidate | Votes | % | ±% |
|---|---|---|---|---|
| TDP | Kothapalli Subbarayudu | 73,160 | 61.7 | ▲6.1 |
| INC | Kalavakolanu Rao | 38,431 | 32.4 | ▼9.5 |
| CPI(M) | Ketha Suryanarayana | 5,292 | 4.5 | |
| BSP | Chintapalli Guruprasad | 836 | 0.7 | ▼0.2 |
| Independent | Patta Rao | 492 | 0.4 | 9.99 |
| Independent | Karimsetti Venkateswarlu | 225 | 0.2 | |
| Anna Telugu Desam Party | Nagidi Bhanumurty | 133 | 0.1 | |
| Independent | Gogulamanda Rao | 24 | 0.0 | |
| Margin of victory | | 34,729 | 28.3 | ▲14.8 |
| Turnout | | 122,902 | 76.3 | ▼0.7 |
| Registered electors | | 161,152 | | +12,681 |
| TDP hold | | Swing | | |

=== 2004 ===
2004 Andhra Pradesh Legislative Assembly election: Narasapuram
| Party | Candidate | Votes | % | ±% |
|---|---|---|---|---|
| TDP | Kothapalli Subbarayudu | 63,288 | 49.72 | −11.97 |
| INC | Mudnuri Prasad Raju | 59,770 | 46.96 | +14.55 |
| Majority | | 3,518 | 2.76 | |
| Turnout | | 127,292 | 79.49 | +5.90 |
| TDP hold | | Swing | | |

=== 2009 ===
2009 Andhra Pradesh Legislative Assembly election: Narasapuram
| Party | Candidate | Votes | % | ±% |
|---|---|---|---|---|
| INC | Mudnuri Prasad Raju | 58,560 | 50.53 | +3.57 |
| PRP | Kothapalli Subbarayudu | 41,235 | 35.58 | |
| TDP | Bommidi Narayana Rao | 10,841 | 9.35 | −40.37 |
| Majority | | 17,325 | 14.95 | |
| Turnout | | 115,893 | 87.17 | +7.68 |
| INC gain from TDP | | Swing | | |

=== 2014 ===
2014 Andhra Pradesh Legislative Assembly election: Narasapuram
| Party | Candidate | Votes | % | ±% |
|---|---|---|---|---|
| TDP | Bandaru Madhava Naidu | 72,747 | 56.00 | |
| YSRCP | Kothapalli Subbarayudu | 51,035 | 39.28 | |
| Majority | | 21,712 | 16.71 | |
| Turnout | | 129,913 | 84.01 | −3.16 |
| TDP gain from INC | | Swing | | |

=== 2019 ===
2019 Andhra Pradesh Legislative Assembly election: Narasapuram
| Party | Candidate | Votes | % | ±% |
|---|---|---|---|---|
| YSRCP | Mudunuri Prasad Raju | 55,556 | 40.68 | +1.4 |
| JSP | Bommidi Narayana Nayakar | 49,120 | 35.97 | +35.97 |
| TDP | Bandaru Madhava Naidu | 27,059 | 19.82 | −36.18 |
| Majority | | 6,436 | 4.71 | |
| Turnout | | 136,556 | 81.19 | −2.82 |
| YSRCP gain from TDP | | Swing | | |

=== 2024 ===
2024 Andhra Pradesh Legislative Assembly election: Narasapuram
| Party | Candidate | Votes | % | ±% |
|---|---|---|---|---|
| JSP | Bommidi Narayana Nayakar | 94,116 | 64.70 | |
| YSRCP | Mudunuri Prasad Raju | 44,378 | 30.52 | |
| INC | Kanuri Udaya Baskara Krishna Prasad | 1,915 | 1.32 | |
| NOTA | None Of The Above | 1,216 | 0.84 | |
| Majority | | 49,738 | 34.20 | |
| Turnout | | 1,45,418 | | |
| JSP gain from YSRCP | | Swing | | |

== See also ==
- List of constituencies of the Andhra Pradesh Legislative Assembly
