= Grandhi Srinivas =

Indian politician

Member of Legislative Assembly Andhra Pradesh
- In office 2019–2024
- Preceded by: Pulaparthi Ramanjaneyulu
- Succeeded by: Pulaparthi Ramanjaneyulu
- Constituency: Bhimavaram
- In office 2004–2009
- Preceded by: Penumatsa Venkata Narasimha Raju
- Succeeded by: Pulaparthi Ramanjaneyulu
- Constituency: Bhimavaram

Personal details
- Born: 10 June 1965 (age 60) Bhimavaram, West Godavari district, Andhra Pradesh
- Other political affiliations: YSR Congress Party (2013–2024); Praja Rajyam Party (2008–2011); Indian National Congress (2004–2008)
- Parent: G. Venkateswar Rao (father)
- Education: Intermediate (1983); KGRL Junior College Bhimavaram
- Occupation: Politician

Grandhi Srinivas (10 June 1965) is an Indian politician from Andhra Pradesh. He is a two-time member of the Andhra Pradesh Legislative Assembly representing Bhimavaram. He won the 2019 election representing YSR Congress Party.

== Early life ==
Srinivas was born in Bhimavaram, West Godavari district to Grandhi Venkateswara Rao. He studied intermediate, the pre university course from KGRL Junior College. He belongs to the Kapu Community.

== Career ==
Srinivas was elected as MLA for the first time from Bhimavaram representing Indian National Congress in the 2004 Andhra Pradesh Legislative Assembly Election. He defeated P Venkata Narisimha Raju of Telugu Desam Party by a margin of 7905 votes.

In 2008, he joined Praja Rajyam Party. However, Praja Rajyam Party announced Vegesna Suryanarayana Raju as MLA candidate and he could not contest the 2009 election. In 2013, he joined YSR Congress Party and contested 2014 Andhra Pradesh Legislative Assembly Election but lost to Ramanjaneyulu Pulaparthi (Anjibabu) of Telugu Desam Party. In 2019, he contested the Bhimavaram seat again on YSR Congress Party ticket and won the 2019 Andhra Pradesh Legislative Assembly election defeating Pavan Kalyan by a margin of 8,357 votes.

In 2024, he lost the 2024 Andhra Pradesh Legislative Assembly election from Bhimavaram as a YSRCP candidate against Janasena Party candidate, Pulaparthi Ramanjaneyulu. In December 2024, he left the YSRCP.
