= Ambati Rambabu =

Indian politician

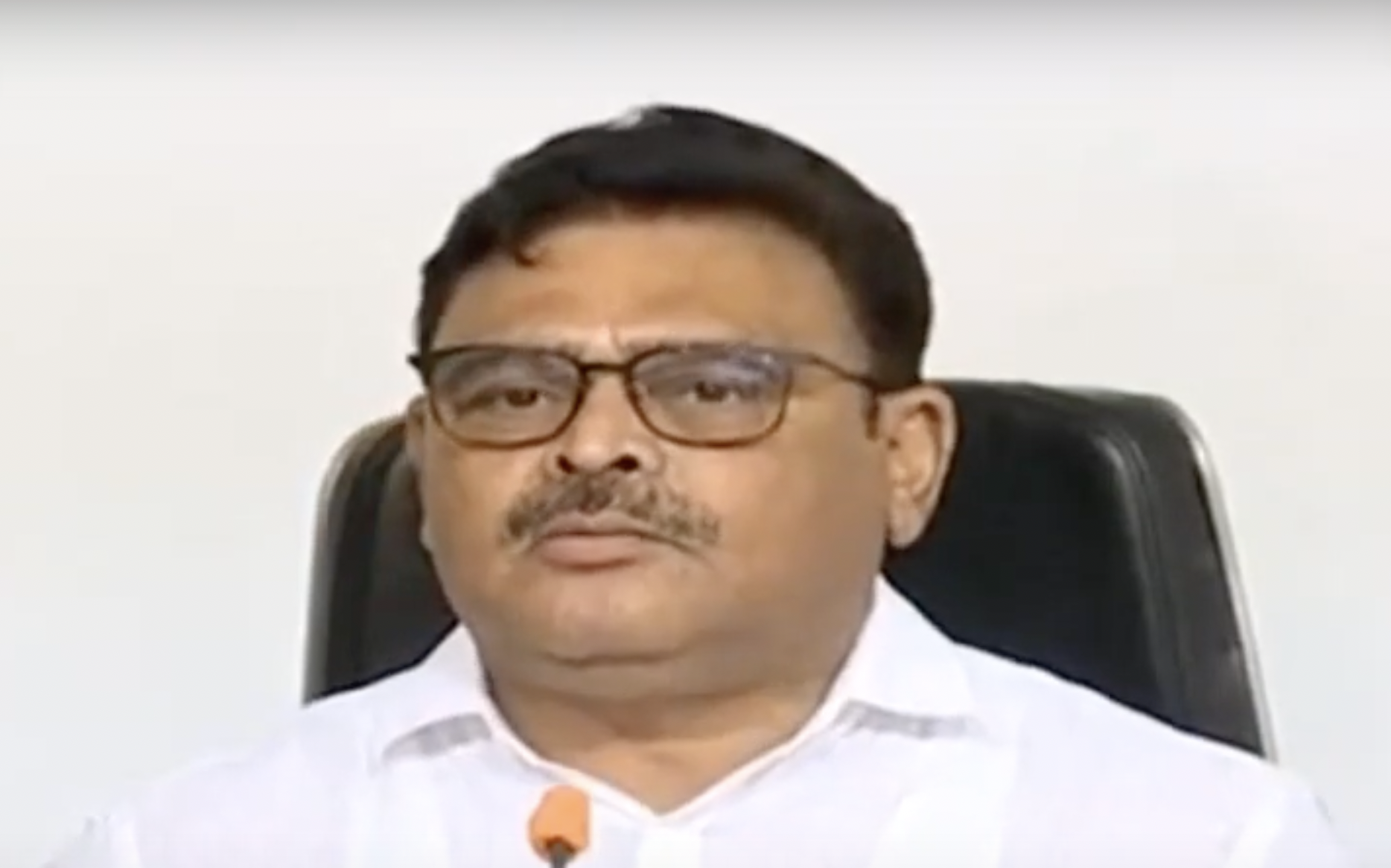
- Ambati in August 2020

Minister of Water Resources Development Government of Andhra Pradesh
- In office 11 April 2022 – 4 June 2024
- Governor: Biswabhusan Harichandan
- Chief Minister: Y. S. Jagan Mohan Reddy
- Preceded by: Poluboina Anil Kumar
- Succeeded by: Nimmala Rama Naidu

Member of Legislative Assembly, Andhra Pradesh
- In office 2019–2024
- Preceded by: Kodela Siva Prasada Rao
- Succeeded by: Kanna Lakshminarayana
- Constituency: Sattenapalle
- In office 1989–1994
- Preceded by: Yadla Venkata Rao
- Succeeded by: Mummaneni Venkata Subbaiah
- Constituency: Repalle

Personal details
- Born: 1956 or 1957 (age 69–70) Repalle, Andhra Pradesh, India
- Party: YSR Congress Party
- Other political affiliations: Indian National Congress
- Children: 3
- Occupation: Politician

Ambati Rambabu (born 1956 or 1957) is an Indian politician from the state of Andhra Pradesh. He has served as the Minister for Irrigation since 2022. A member of the YSR Congress Party, he was a member of the Andhra Pradesh Legislative Assembly from the Sattenapalle constituency in the 2019 elections.

He entered politics with Indian National Congress. He was elected the Member of the Legislative Assembly from Repalle constituency during 1989–94, and later served as the chairman of Andhra Pradesh Industrial Infrastructure Corporation during 2005–09. After the death of Y. S. Rajasekhara Reddy, he continued his support of Reddy's son Y. S. Jagan Mohan Reddy. In July 2010, he was suspended from the Indian National Congress. In March 2011, he joined Jagan's newly-founded YSR Congress Party and has been a spokesperson for that party.

== Early life and education ==
Ambati Rambabu was born to AVSR Anjaneyulu and Venkata Subbamma in Repalle, Andhra Pradesh. He completed law education from the Nyaya Vidya Parishath Law College at Visakhapatnam in 1986. He practiced briefly as an advocate in his early career. He acted in an obscure film during his younger years before moving on to politics. After entering politics, he played a guest role in Tholakeni Pitta.

== Political career ==
=== Indian National Congress ===
Ambati started his political career with Indian National Congress. He was appointed the legal cell convener of the Guntur District Congress Party in 1988, president of the District Youth Congress in 1994 and as the chairman of the Non-Conventional Energy Resources Development Corporation.

In the 1989 Andhra Pradesh Legislative Assembly elections from Repalle constituency, he contested as a Congress party candidate and won as the MLA. However, he lost the 1994 and 1999 elections to Telugu Desam Party's (TDP) Mummaneni Venkata Subbaiah.

He was the chairman of Andhra Pradesh Industrial Infrastructure Corporation (APIIC) from 2005 until 2007 during the chief ministership of Y. S. Rajasekhara Reddy. He was also the general secretary of Andhra Pradesh Congress Committee (APCC).

=== Suspension from Congress ===
After the death of Y. S. Rajasekhara Reddy, the then chief minister of Andhra Pradesh from Congress who died in a helicopter crash in September 2009, his son Y. S. Jagan Mohan Reddy went on an odarpu yatra, a consolation tour during which he visited families supposedly affected by the death of his father, against the wishes of Congress party's High Command. Ambati, a confidant of Jagan and his father, stated in July 2010 he would remain with Congress and support Jagan at the same time.

Later the same month, he alleged that Konijeti Rosaiah, the then chief minister of Andhra Pradesh, was obstructing Jagan's yatra. Following a complaint by APCC over his statement, All India Congress Committee suspended him from Congress party citing anti-party activities and statements.

He acted as the chief spokesman for Jagan's camp, a group comprising MLAs and other politicians from Congress party who supported Jagan, when Jagan was still with Congress.

=== YSR Congress Party ===
In March 2011, Ambati joined Jagan's newly-founded YSR Congress Party (YSRCP). As of April 2022, he is one of the official spokespersons of YSRCP, having been appointed as such in May 2011.

In September 2011, Telugu news channel ABN Andhra Jyothi broadcast a sting operation on Ambati where he was alleged to have allured a woman over phone for sexual favours. A few hours later, the woman involved came forward and declared that she was coerced by a representative of the news channel to make the allegations. Several cable operators in Guntur, in which Ambati holds a majority stake-holding, had blocked broadcast of the channel; Ambati denied the allegations and accused the channel of defaming him. He obtained a temporary injunction from Andhra Pradesh High Court against the channel, restricting it from broadcasting any content defaming him.

In January 2013, Ambati was questioned by the Central Bureau of Investigation as part of an investigation into alleged irregularities in land allotments to Emaar Properties involving APIIC and Rajasekhara Reddy's government, as Ambati was the chairman of the corporation at that time. He alleged that the investigation was intended to harass Jagan, his family and YSRCP members.

He contested the 2014 elections as the YSRCP candidate from Sattenapalle constituency and lost to Kodela Siva Prasada Rao of TDP. He later contested the 2019 elections from Sattenapalle, despite facing resistance from local YSRCP politicians, and won as the MLA against Kodela. In April 2022, he was inducted into the Y. S. Jagan Mohan Reddy's cabinet and was allocated the Ministry of Irrigation (Water Resources) portfolio, replacing Anil Kumar Poluboina. He was also appointed the in-charge minister for Nellore district.

In 2024 Andhra Pradesh Legislative Assembly election he contested the elections from sattenapalle and lost to his rival Kanna Lakshminarayana by 27,836 votes.

== Personal life ==
Ambati is married to Vijayalakshmi. The couple has three daughters.
