= Datla Balarama Raju =

Indian politician (1907–1998)

Member of Parliament, Lok Sabha
- In office 1962–1971
- Preceded by: Uddaraju Ramam
- Succeeded by: M. T. Raju
- Constituency: Narasapuram

Personal details
- Born: 15 December 1907 Kavitam, West Godavari district, Madras Presidency, British India (Presently Andhra Pradesh, India)
- Died: 12 May 1998 (aged 90)
- Party: Indian National Congress
- Spouse: D. Suvhadraiah
- Children: D. V. S. Raju

Datla Balarama Raju (1907-1998) was an Indian politician. He was a member of parliament, representing Narasapuram in the Lok Sabha, the lower house of India's Parliament, as a member of the Indian National Congress. Noted film producer D. V. S. Raju was his son.
