= Kanumuri Bapi Raju =

Indian politician

Member of Parliament, Lok Sabha
- In office 2009–2014
- Preceded by: Chegondi Harirama Jogaiah
- Succeeded by: Gokaraju Ganga Raju
- Constituency: Narsapuram, Andhra Pradesh
- In office 1998–1999
- Preceded by: Kothapalli Subbarayudu
- Succeeded by: Krishnam Raju
- Constituency: Narasapuram

Personal details
- Born: 25 June 1947 (age 79) Juvvalapalem, West Godavari; Andhra Pradesh
- Party: Indian National Congress
- Education: Hyderabad Public School

Kanumuri Bapi Raju (born 25 June 1947) is an Indian politician, a five term Member of Legislative Assembly in the Andhra Pradesh Legislative Assembly and a two term member of parliament. Raju represented the Narsapuram constituency in 1998 and 2009. He also served as the Chairman of the Tirumala Tirupathi Devasthanam.

== Electoral History ==
=== Lok Sabha ===
Year	Constituency	Party	Votes	%	Opponent	Party	Votes	%	Result	Margin	%
1996	Narasapur	INC	2,86,910	40.43	Kothapalli Subbarayudu (Pedababu)	TDP	3,04,536	42.91	Lost	-17,626	-2.48
1998	Narasapur	INC	3,68,630	50.66	Kothapalli Subbarayudu (Pedababu)	TDP	3,20,660	44.07	Won	+47,970	+6.59
1999	Narasapur	INC	2,55,151	36.22	Uppalapati Venkata Krishnam Raju	BJP	4,21,099	59.78	Lost	-1,65,948	-23.56
2009	Narsapuram	INC	3,89,422	39.30	Thota Sita Rama Lakshmi	TDP	2,74,732	27.72	Won	+1,14,690	+11.58
2014	Narsapuram	INC	27,083	2.49	Gokaraju Ganga Raju	BJP	5,40,306	49.61	Lost	-5,13,223	-47.12
2019	Narsapuram	INC	13,941	1.18	Kanumuru Raghu Rama Krishna Raju	YCP	4,49,234	38.10	Lost	-4,35,293	-36.92

== See also ==
- Politics of Andhra Pradesh
