= Raghu Rama Krishna Raju =

Indian politician

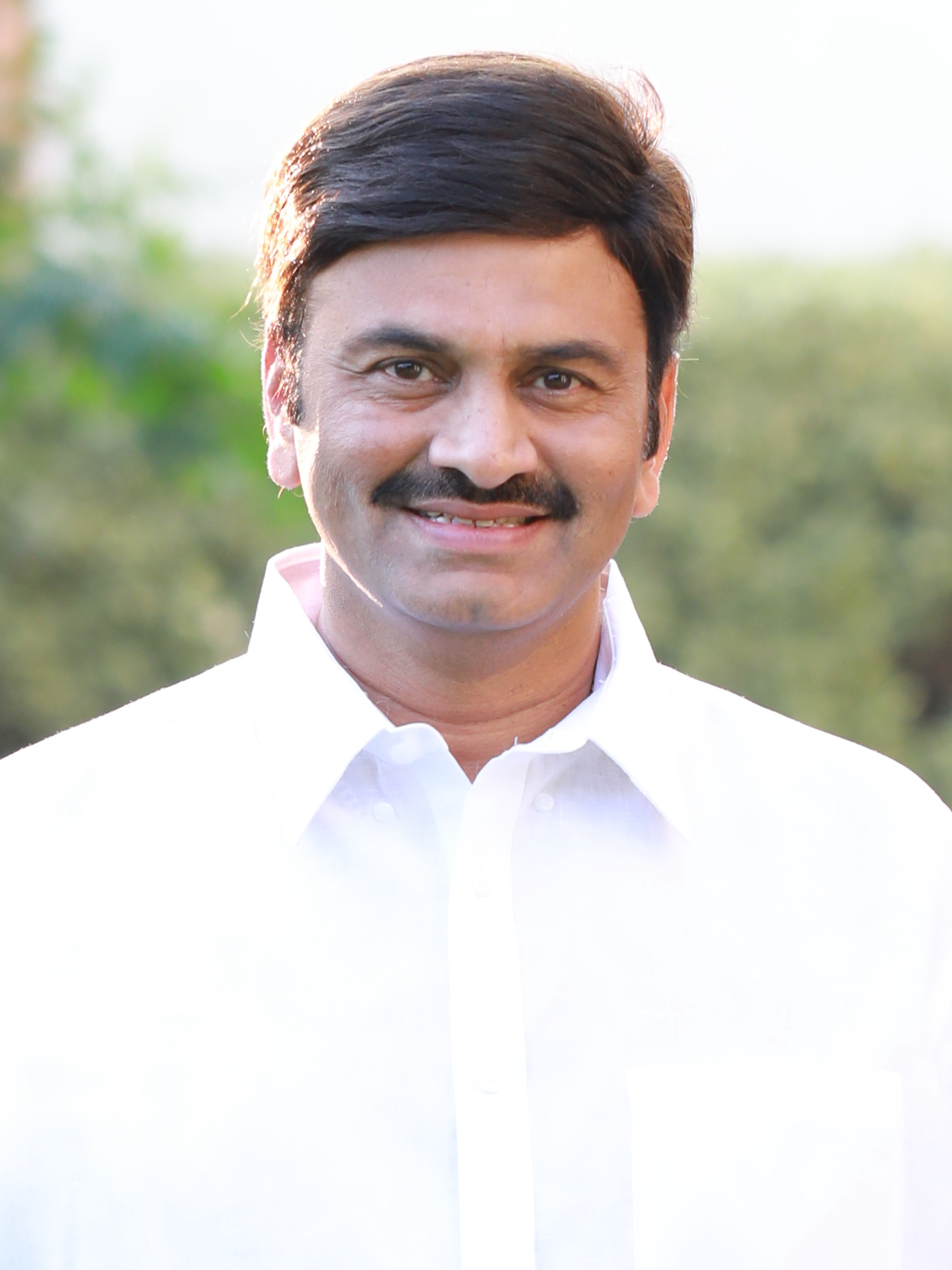

23rd Deputy Speaker of the Andhra Pradesh Legislative Assembly
- Incumbent
- Assumed office 14 November 2024
- Governor: Syed Abdul Nazeer
- Speaker: Chintakayala Ayyanna Patrudu
- Leader of the House: Nara Chandrababu Naidu
- Preceded by: Kolagatla Veerabhadra Swamy

Member of Andhra Pradesh Legislative Assembly
- Incumbent
- Assumed office 12 June 2024
- Preceded by: Mantena Rama Raju
- Constituency: Undi

Member of Parliament, Lok Sabha
- In office 17 June 2019 – 5 June 2024
- Preceded by: Gokaraju Ganga Raju
- Succeeded by: Bhupathi Raju Srinivasa Varma
- Constituency: Narasapuram

Personal details
- Born: 14 May 1962 (age 64) Vijayawada, Andhra Pradesh, India
- Party: Telugu Desam Party (2018–2019; 2024–present)
- Other political affiliations: YSR Congress Party (2012–2014; 2019–2024); Bharatiya Janata Party (2014–2018)
- Spouse: Rama Devi
- Children: 2
- Parent: K. V. S. Suryanarayana Raju
- Education: Andhra University
- Occupation: Industrialist; politician

Kanumuru Raghu Rama Krishna Raju (born 14 May 1962) is an Indian industrialist and politician who is the 23rd Deputy speaker of the Andhra Pradesh Legislative assembly. He is a Member of Legislative assembly (MLA) in the Andhra Pradesh Legislative assembly representing Undi assembly constituency. He previously served as a Member of Parliament (MP) in the 17th Lok Sabha representing Narasapuram constituency, Andhra Pradesh. He belongs to Telugu Desam Party.

== Early life ==
Raghu Rama Krishna Raju was born on 14 May 1962 in Vijayawada, Andhra Pradesh to Kanumuru Venkata Satya Suryanarayana Raju and Annapoorna. He studied Master of Pharmacy at Andhra University, Visakhapatnam.

Raju married Rama Devi in 1980. The couple have a son and a daughter.

== Political career ==
Raghu Rama Krishna Raju, a politician from the Telugu Desam Party (TDP), quit YSRCP party in 2014 after failing to secure the party's nomination for the 2014 Lok Sabha elections and joined the Bharatiya Janata Party (BJP). In 2018, he left the BJP and joined the YSR Congress Party (YSRCP). Then, in March 2024, he quit the YSRCP again and rejoined the TDP, thereby changing parties a total of 5 times in a span of 9 years.

He has contested in the 2019 elections from the Narasapuram Lok Sabha constituency as a YSRCP candidate. He has won the election securing 38.11% votes polled with a majority of 31,909 votes against TDP's Vetukuri Venkata Siva Rama Raju.

Raju is an outspoken critic of his ex-party and its chief who is ex chief minister, Y. S. Jagan Mohan Reddy. The differences between them were made public in November 2019 when Raju spoke out against the Andhra Pradesh government's effort to convert Telugu medium government schools to English medium. Ever since he spoke against his party and alleged scams in several government schemes.

In July 2020, YSRCP appealed to the Lok Sabha speaker to disqualify Raju as an MP stating Raju's anti-party activities as the reason. In October 2020, Raju wrote to Prime Minister Narendra Modi, alleging that Jaganmohan Reddy was promoting evangelism in Andhra Pradesh, in violation of the Indian constitution.

He was nominated as candidate from TDP for Undi Assembly constituency for 2024 AP elections and won as MLA and later on 14 November 2024 elected unopposed Andhra Pradesh Legislative Assembly Deputy speaker.

== Legal issues ==
In March 2021, Central Bureau of Investigation (CBI) booked a case against Raju and his family members who are directors of Ind Bharath Power Gencom Limited on charges of criminal conspiracy, cheating, forgery of valuable security, using forged documents as genuine and criminal misconduct of a public servant. The case was booked on behalf of a complaint by the State Bank of India alleging that the borrowing company, its directors, and public servants conspired to cheat and siphoned off a total of ₹947 crore (equivalent to ₹12 billion or US$120 million in 2026) of bank funds.

In April 2021, he asked a CBI Special court to cancel the bail granted to Jagan Mohan Reddy. He alleged that the chief minister, on bail since 2012 on his disproportionate assets case, had violated the bail condition.

On 14 May 2021, Raju was arrested by the Andhra Pradesh Criminal Investigation Department (CID) on the charges of sedition for "disturbing communal harmony and attacking dignitaries of the Jagan Mohan Reddy government". On 21 May, the Supreme Court of India granted him bail on a ₹1 lakh (equivalent to ₹1.2 lakh or US$1,300 in 2026) bond, stating the charges against him did not require custodial interrogation and referred to his bodily injuries mentioned in the medical report prepared by Secunderabad Army Hospital doctors.
