= Bangaru Usha Rani =

Indian politician

Member of Legislative Assembly Andhra Pradesh
- In office 2009–2014
- Preceded by: Ch. Satyanarayana Murthy (Dr.Babjee)
- Succeeded by: Nimmala Rama Naidu
- Constituency: Palakollu

Personal details
- Born: Andhra Pradesh, India

Bangaru Usha Rani, served as a Member of Legislative Assembly of Andhra Pradesh, India. She represents the Indian National Congress party. She was elected to the Andhra Pradesh Assembly from the Palakollu constituency on 16 May 2009 by defeating the Praja Rajyam President Konidella Chiranjeevi with good majority.

== Political career ==
She was a Municipal Chairperson for the town of Palakollu. She was the Member of Andhra Pradesh Legislative Assembly with the Indian National Congress for 2009–2014 term. She belongs to the Arya Vysya community .

== See also ==
- Palakol (Assembly constituency)
