= Bommidi Narayana Nayakar =

Indian politician from Andhra Pradesh

Member of the Andhra Pradesh Legislative Assembly
- Incumbent
- Assumed office 2024
- Preceded by: Mudunuri Prasad Raju
- Constituency: Narasapuram

Personal details
- Party: Jana Sena Party

Bommidi Narayana Nayakar is an Indian politician from Andhra Pradesh. He is a member of Jana Sena Party.

== Political career ==
Nayakar was elected as the Member of the Legislative Assembly from Narasapuram Assembly constituency in 2024 Andhra Pradesh Legislative Assembly elections. He won the elections by a margin of 49738 votes defeating Mudunuri Prasad Raju of the YSR Congress Party.

Nayakar was appointed whip on 12 November 2024.

== Electoral performance ==
2024 Andhra Pradesh Legislative Assembly election: Narasapuram
Party	Candidate	Votes	%	±%
JSP	Bommidi Narayana Nayakar	94,116	64.70	
YSRCP	Mudunuri Prasad Raju	44,378	30.52	
INC	Kanuri Udaya Baskara Krishna Prasad	1,915	1.32	
NOTA	None Of The Above	1,216	0.84	
Majority		49,738	34.20	
Turnout		1,45,418		
JSP gain from YSRCP		Swing		
