= V. V. Siva Rama Raju =

Indian politician

Member of Legislative Assembly Andhra Pradesh
- In office 2009-2019
- Preceded by: Pathapati Sarraju
- Succeeded by: Manthena Ramaraju
- Constituency: Undi

Personal details
- Born: 1970 (age 55–56) Kalavapudi, Andhra Pradesh, India
- Party: Telugu Desam Party
- Spouse: Smt. V. V. Aruna Kumari
- Children: Shruthi Keerthi, Sravya Gayatri, Abhi Rama Vama
- Education: Bachelor of Commerce
- Alma mater: Andhra University
- Occupation: Politician, Businessman
- Website: kalavapudisiva.org

Vetukuri Venkata Siva Rama Raju is an Indian politician and former member of Andhra Pradesh Legislative Assembly representing Telugu Desam Party (TDP) from Undi Assembly constituency.

== Biography ==
=== Political career ===
In 2009 he was elected as a representative from the Undi constituency in the 2009 Andhra Pradesh Legislative Assembly election with 42.07% of the votes, a majority of 15,568 votes. He ran again in the 2014 general elections and was elected to the Andhra Pradesh assembly from the Undi constituency with a vote share of 58.21% and a majority of 36,231 votes, one of the highest majorities in the 2014 Andhra Pradesh general elections. In 2019 General elections he contested from Narasapuram Lok Sabha constituency and get defeated by Kanumuru Raghu Rama Krishna Raju with margin of 3% votes.

=== Personal life ===
Vetukuri Venkata Siva Rama Raju was born on 10 May 1970 in a small village of Kalavapudi in the West Godavari district of Andhra Pradesh. Siva attended primary and secondary schooling in Eluru at St. Xavier's High school graduating in 1984. He went to Bhimavaram for his higher education and completed his intermediate education at Kasturibhai Government Junior College. He received his Bachelor of Commerce Degree from Dantuluri Natrayana Raju College (D.N.R. College - Andhra University) Bhimavaram, in 1989.

He is an active director of VEM Technologies Private Limited which operates in assembly and systems integration for aerospace and defense systems.

=== Awards ===
Vetukuri Venkata Sivarama Raju was awarded the Bharatiya Chaatra Samsad Foundation, Pune's Adarsh Yuva Vidhayak Puraskar. Bharatiya Chaatra Samsad Foundation has invited Mr. Raju to address its sixth annual convention. According to a press release, Mr. Raju had organised installation of 78 RO water plants in 70 villages. Under Neeru-Chettu programme, nearly 30,000 tree guards were provided. The significant initiative is distribution of seed packets with 17 types of seed to 70,000 families.

=== Political Statistics ===
Elections
Election No.	Year	Assembly Constituency	Opponent	Total Votes	Margin	Result
1	2009	Undi	Pathapati Sarraju (INC)	68,102	15,658	WON
2	2014	Undi	Pathapati Sarraju (YSRCP)	101,530	36,231	WON

Government offices
Preceded by Pathapati Sarraju	Representative, Undi Constituency, Andhra Pradesh Assembly; 2009-present	Succeeded by none(incumbent)
