= Bhupathi Raju Srinivasa Varma =

Indian politician

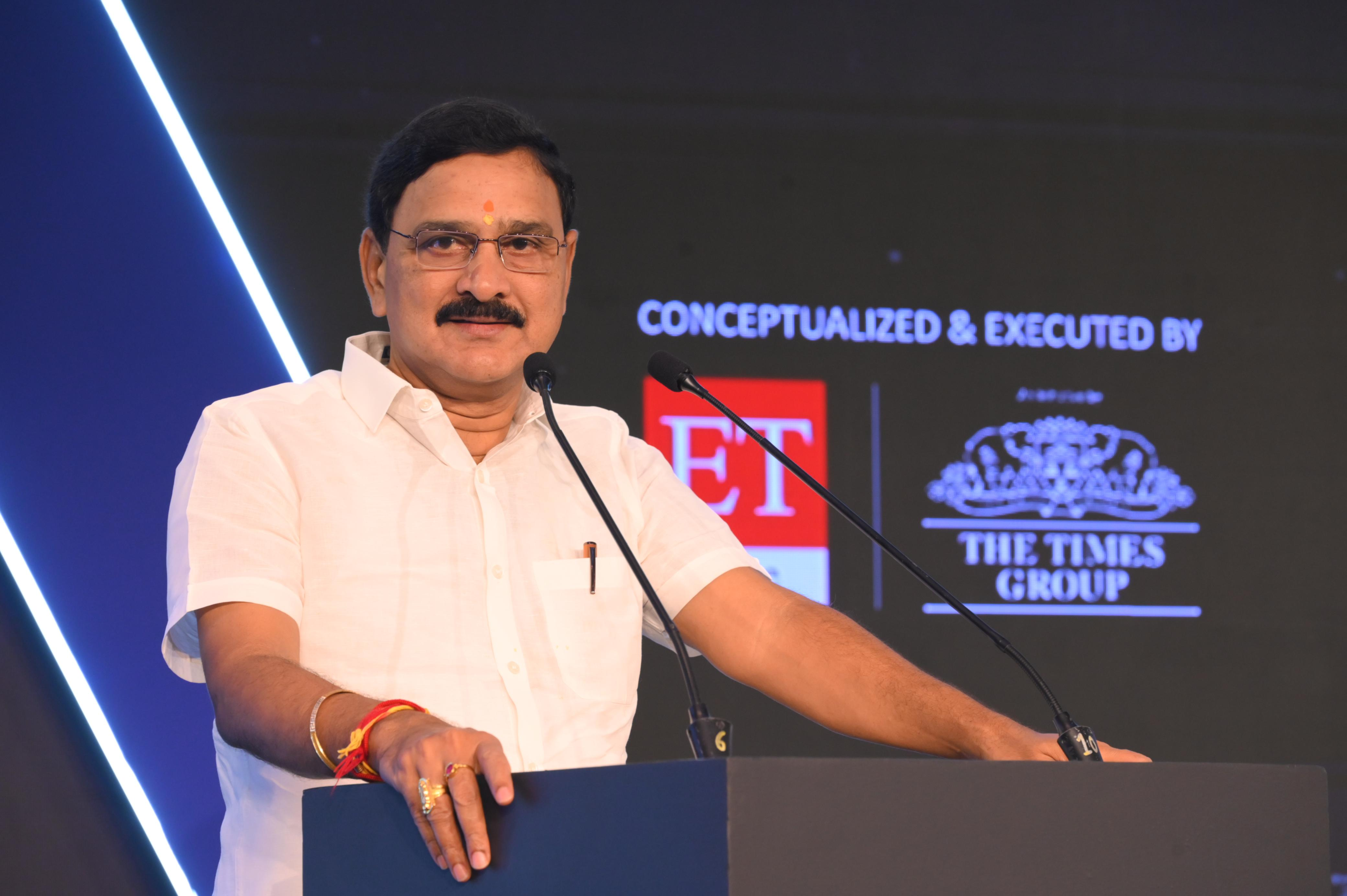

15th Union Minister of State for Heavy Industries
- Incumbent
- Assumed office 11 June 2024
- President: Droupadi Murmu
- Prime Minister: Narendra Modi
- Minister: H. D. Kumaraswamy
- Preceded by: Krishan Pal Gurjar

21st Union Minister of State for Steel
- Incumbent
- Assumed office 11 June 2024
- President: Draupadi Murmu
- Prime Minister: Narendra Modi
- Minister: H. D. Kumaraswamy
- Preceded by: Faggan Singh Kulaste

Member of Parliament, Lok Sabha
- Incumbent
- Assumed office 4 June 2024
- Preceded by: Kanumuru Raghu Rama Krishna Raju
- Constituency: Narasapuram

Personal details
- Party: Bharatiya Janata Party
- Occupation: Politician

Bhupathiraju Srinivasa Varma is an Indian politician from Bhimavaram, Andhra Pradesh. He was elected as a Member of Parliament from Narasapuram Lok Sabha constituency. He belongs to Bharatiya Janata Party.

== Political career ==
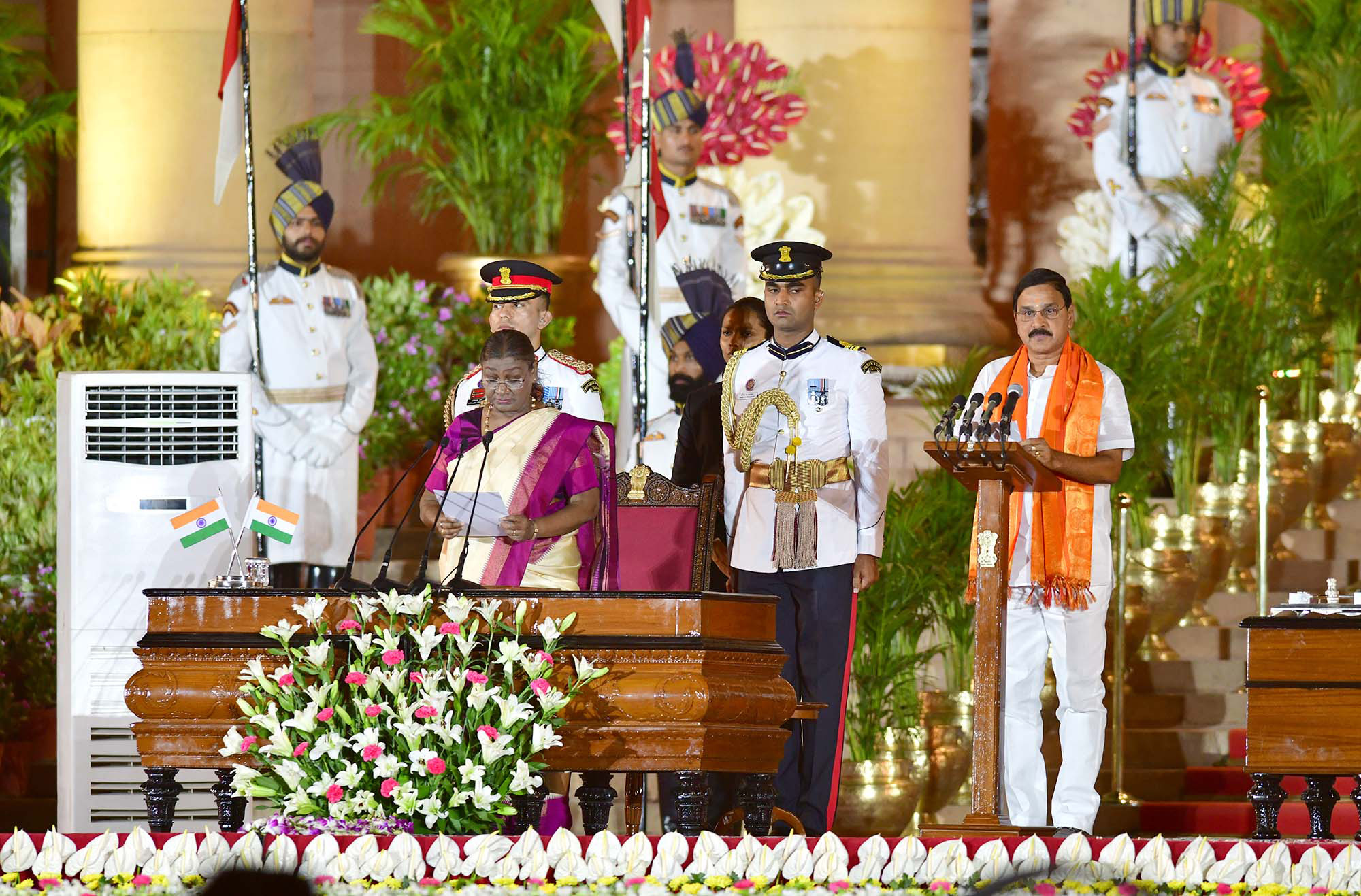
Varma taking oath as union minister

Bhupathi Raju Srinivasa Varma worked for AISAF as a student leader in 1980 and later started his political career by joining BJP in 1988 as a BJP worker. Between 1991 - 97 he served as the District President of BJP Bhimavaram Town, served twice as West Godavari district president of BJP from 2008-14. In 2014, he won as councilor of Bhimavaram municipal ward with the support of Telugu Desam Party. He also worked as the in-charge chairman. He worked as Bharatiya Janatha Party State Secretary from 2020-23. In 2024, with the support of Telugu Desam Party and Jana Sena Party he was elected as MP on BJP ticket from Narsapuram constituency with a huge margin of 2.76 lakh votes.

== Elections contested and results ==
- Member of Parliament

Year	Constituency	Result	vote	opponent	vote	margin
2024	Narasapuram	Won	7,07,343	Guduri Umabala	4,30,541	2,76,802

== See also ==
- Third Modi ministry
