= Bandaru Madhava Naidu =

Indian politician

Member of Legislative Assembly Andhra Pradesh
- In office 2014–2019
- Constituency: Narasapuram

Personal details
- Born: Andhra Pradesh, India
- Party: Telugu Desam Party

Bandaru Madhava Naidu is an Indian politician. He was elected in the 2014 Andhra Pradesh Legislative Assembly election as an MLA of Narasapuram (Assembly constituency), representing Telugu Desam Party.
