= Palakollu Assembly constituency =

Constituency of the Andhra Pradesh Legislative Assembly, India

Coordinates: 16.52°N 81.72°E

Palakollu
- Constituency No. 57 for the Andhra Pradesh Legislative Assembly
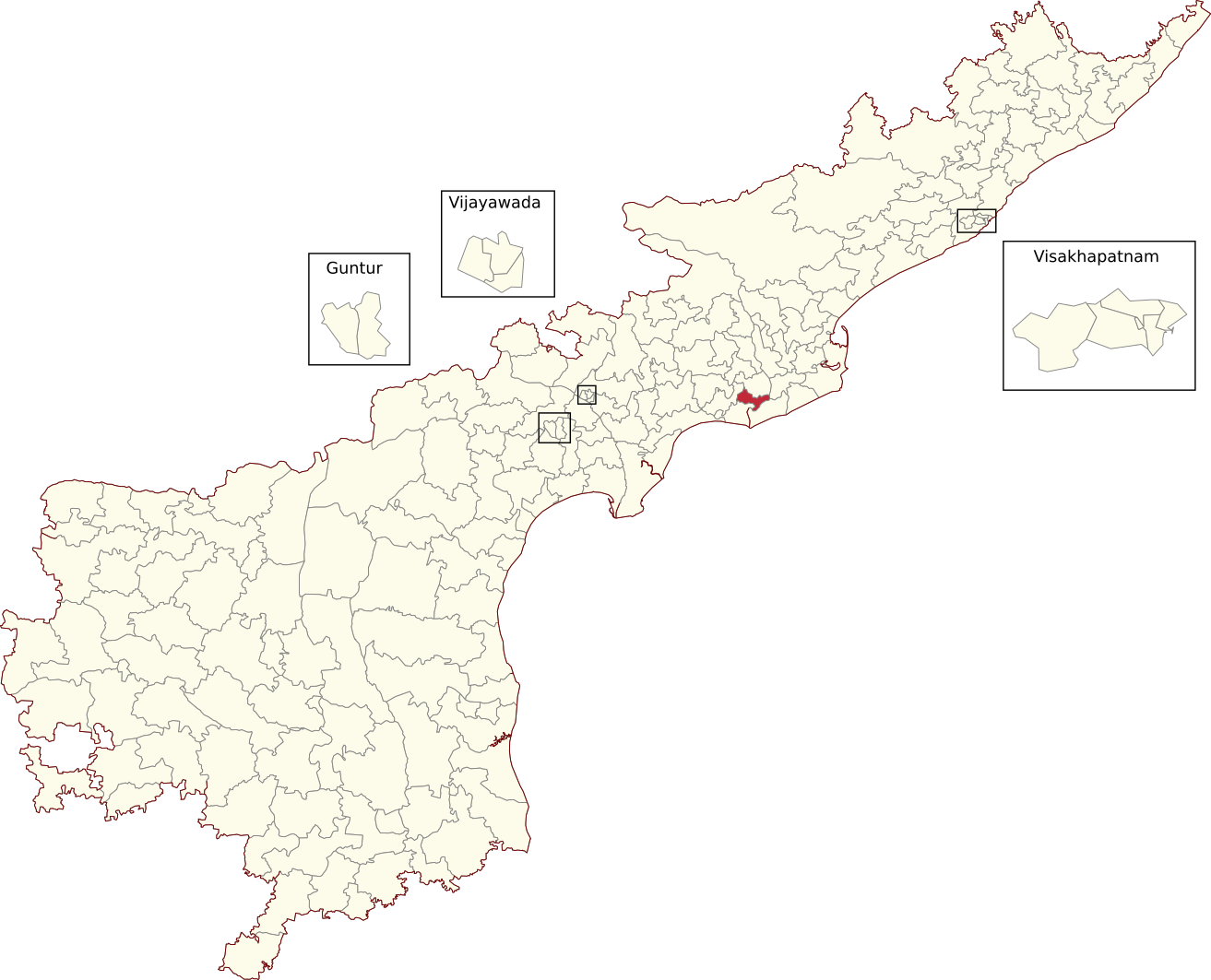
- Location of Palakollu Assembly constituency within Andhra Pradesh

Constituency details
- Country: India
- Region: South India
- State: Andhra Pradesh
- District: West Godavari
- Lok Sabha constituency: Narasapuram
- Established: 1951
- Total electors: 190,125
- Reservation: None

Member of Legislative Assembly
- 16th Andhra Pradesh Legislative Assembly
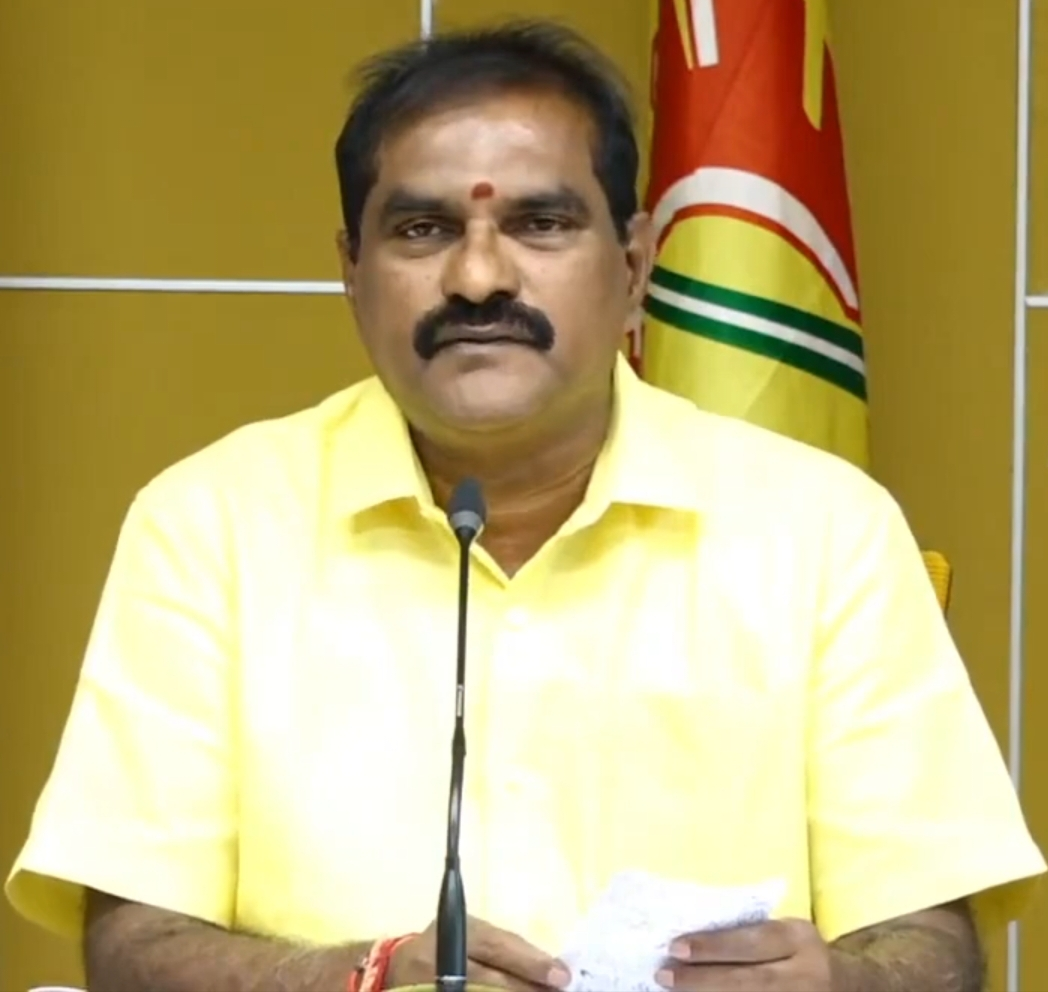
- Incumbent Nimmala Rama Naidu
- Party: TDP
- Alliance: NDA
- Elected year: 2024

Palakollu Assembly constituency is a constituency in West Godavari district of Andhra Pradesh that elects representatives to the Andhra Pradesh Legislative Assembly in India. It is one of the seven assembly segments of Narasapuram Lok Sabha constituency.

Most Successful parties from Palakollu Assembly Constituency
1. INC (7 Times) (43.8%)
2. TDP (8 Times) (50.0%)
3. CPI (1 Time) (6.25%)

Nimmala Rama Naidu is the current MLA of the constituency, having won the 2024 Andhra Pradesh Legislative Assembly election from Telugu Desam Party. As of 25 March 2019, there are a total of 190,125 electors in the constituency. The constituency was established in 1951, as per the Delimitation Orders (1951).

== Mandals ==
The three mandals that form the assembly constituency are:

Mandal
Palakollu
Yelamanchili
Poduru (Part)

== Members of the Legislative Assembly ==
Year	Member	Political party
1955	Addepalli Satyanarayana Murthy	Indian National Congress
1962	Addepalli Satyanarayana Murthy	Indian National Congress
1967	Polisetty Seshavataram	Communist Party of India
1972	Chegondi Venkata Harirama Jogaiah	Indian National Congress
1978	Vardhineedi Satyanarayana	Indian National Congress
1983	Allu Venkata Satyanarayana	Telugu Desam Party
1985	Allu Venkata Satyanarayana	Telugu Desam Party
1989	Chegondi Venkata Harirama Jogaiah	Indian National Congress
1994	Allu Venkata Satyanarayana	Telugu Desam Party
1999	Allu Venkata Satyanarayana	Telugu Desam Party
2004	Ch. Satyanarayana Murthy (Dr.Babjee)	Telugu Desam Party
2009	Bangaru Usha Rani	Indian National Congress
2014	Nimmala Rama Naidu	Telugu Desam Party
2019	Nimmala Rama Naidu	Telugu Desam Party
2024	Nimmala Rama Naidu	Telugu Desam Party

== Election results ==
=== 2024 ===
2024 Andhra Pradesh Legislative Assembly election: Palakollu
Party	Candidate	Votes	%	±%
TDP	Nimmala Rama Naidu	113,114	69.30	
YSRCP	Gudala Srihari Gopala Rao	45,169	27.67	
INC	Kolukuluri Arjun Rao	1,945	1.19	
NOTA	None Of The Above	919	0.56	
Majority		67,945	41.62	
Turnout		1,63,213		
TDP hold		Swing		

=== 2019 ===
2019 Andhra Pradesh Legislative Assembly election: Palakollu
Party	Candidate	Votes	%	±%
TDP	Nimmala Ramanaidu	67,549	43.18	
YSRCP	Ch. Satyanarayana Murty	49,740	31.80	
JSP	Gunnam Nagababu	32,984	21.09	New
NOTA	Nota	1,170	0.75	
Majority		17,809	11.39	
Turnout		156,421	82.27	−1.05
TDP hold		Swing		

=== 2014 ===
2014 Andhra Pradesh Legislative Assembly election: Palakollu
Party	Candidate	Votes	%	±%
TDP	Nimmala Rama Naidu	51,523	36.28	
YSRCP	Meka Seshu Babu	45,140	31.78	
Independent	Ch. Satyanarayana Murty	38,420	27.05	
NOTA	None of the above	733	0.52	
Majority		6,383	4.49	
Turnout		142,034	83.32	−3.32
TDP gain from INC		Swing		

=== 2009 ===
2009 Andhra Pradesh Legislative Assembly election: Palakollu
Party	Candidate	Votes	%	±%
INC	Bangaru Usha Rani	49,720	38.09	+2.59
PRP	Konidala Chiranjeevi	44,274	33.92	
TDP	Ch. Satyanarayana Murty	29,371	22.50	−25.23
Majority		5,446	13.27	
Turnout		130,532	86.64	+11.48
INC gain from PRP		Swing		

=== 2004 ===
2004 Andhra Pradesh Legislative Assembly election: Palakollu
Party	Candidate	Votes	%	±%
TDP	Ch. Satyanarayana Murty (Dr.Babjee)	46,077	47.73	−6.62
INC	Gunnam Nagababu	34,076	35.50	−6.18
Independent	Meka Seshu Babu	13,991	14.4	
BSP	kollabathula Eliya	1,496		
Pyramid Party of India	Venkateswara Rao Meka	902		
Majority		12,001	12.43	
Turnout		96,542	75.16	+6.56
TDP hold		Swing		

=== 1999 ===
1999 Andhra Pradesh Legislative Assembly election: Palakollu
Party	Candidate	Votes	%	±%
TDP	Allu Venkata Satyanarayana	47,220	54.35	
INC	Mentay Padmanabham	35,800	41.21	
NTRTDP(LP)	Devalla Rama Rao	1,933	2.22	
CPI(M)	Thottempudi Prabhavathi	1,362	1.57	
Independent	Adabala Sujana Devi	310	0.36	
Independent	Penugonda Venkateswara	122	0.14	
Independent	Sidagam Narasimha Murty (anthervedi)	98	0.11	
Independent	Jagannadha Rao	37	0.04	
TDP hold		Swing		
Majority		11,420	13.14	
Turnout		86,882	68.6	

=== 1994 ===
1994 Andhra Pradesh Legislative Assembly election: Palakollu
Party	Candidate	Votes	%	±%
TDP	Allu Venkata Satyanarayana	50,750	56.31	
INC	Chegondi Venkata Harirama Jogaiah	36,350	40.33	
BSP	Estheruani Muvvala	1745	1.9	
BJP	Chennasreeramulu Boda	899	1.0	
Independent	Kappala Subbaiah Paul	130	1.0	
Independent	Anisetti Subbarayudu	113	1.0	
Independent	Sidagam Narasimhamurty (ANTARVEDI)	79	1.0	
Independent	Tammineedi Satyanarayanarao	61	1.0	
Majority		14,400	15.9	
Turnout		90,127	71.03	
TDP hold		Swing		

=== 1989 ===
1989 Andhra Pradesh Legislative Assembly election: Palakollu
Party	Candidate	Votes	%	±%
INC	Chegondi Venkata Harirama Jogaiah	43,973	49.70	
TDP	Allu Venkata Satyanarayana	42,579	48.13	
Independent	Guru Prasad Rao Chintapalli	1,921	2.17	
Majority		1,394	1.5	
Turnout		90,548	74.32	
INC hold		Swing		

=== 1985 ===
1985 Andhra Pradesh Legislative Assembly election: Palakollu
Party	Candidate	Votes	%	±%
TDP	Allu Venkata Satyanarayana	47,044	62.8	
INC	Vardhineedi Satyanaraana	26,470	35.3	
Independent	Veeravalli Ramakrishna	380	0.5	
Independent	Sanku Veeranna	292	0.4	
Independent	Allu Peerala Swamu	247	0.3	
Independent	Kunor Raja Gottukukala	141	0.2	
Independent	Ghikkala Visweswara Rao	136	0.2	
Independent	Kopalla Tata Rao	108	0.1	
Independent	Chama Venkateswara Rao	90	0.1	
Majority		20,574	27.2	
Turnout		75685	72.5	
TDP hold		Swing		

=== 1983 ===
1983 Andhra Pradesh Legislative Assembly election: Palakollu
Party	Candidate	Votes	%	±%
TDP	Allu Venkata Satyanarayana	45,082	66.11	
INC	Vardhineedi Satyanarayana	18,507	27.14	
CPI(M)	Alluri Satyanarayana Raju	3828	5.6	
INC(J)	Nekkanti Visweswara Rao	502	0.7	
Independent	Guttula Nageswara Rao	269	0.4	
Majority		26,575	38.5	
Turnout		69,034	71.80	
Independent hold		Swing		

=== 1978 ===
1978 Andhra Pradesh Legislative Assembly election: Palakollu
Party	Candidate	Votes	%	±%
INC(I)	Vardhineedi Satyanarayana	32,762	47.07	
INC	Chodisetti Suryarao	19,699	28.2	
CPI(M)	Alluri Satyanarayana Raju	16,639	23.9	
Independent	Gadiraju Bangaramma	667	1.0	
Majority		13,063	18.4	
Turnout		70855	76.1	
INC(I) hold		Swing		

=== 1972 ===
1972 Andhra Pradesh Legislative Assembly election: Palakollu
Party	Candidate	Votes	%	±%
INC(I)	Chegondi Venkata Harirama Jogaiah	37,843	61.53	
Independent	Chodisetti Suryarao	22,755	37	
SSP	Kolukuluri Venkate	908	1.48	
Majority		15,088		
Turnout		61,506	76.74	
INC(I) hold		Swing		

=== 1967 ===
1967 Andhra Pradesh Legislative Assembly election: Palakollu
Party	Candidate	Votes	%	±%
CPI(M)	Polisetty Seshavataram	27,161	49.68	
INC	U.Surapa Raju	19,905	36.41	
Independent	V.R Jakkamsetti	3,458	6.33	
SWA	K.V.Rao	3,169	5.80	
Independent	M.G.Raju	977	1.79	
Majority		7,256		
Turnout		54,670	76.16	
CPI(M) hold		Swing		

=== 1962 ===
1962 Andhra Pradesh Legislative Assembly election: Palakollu
Party	Candidate	Votes	%	±%
INC	Addepalli Satyanarayana Murthy	24,028	50.04	
CPI	Polisetty Seshavataram	20,696	43.09	
SWA	Golla Krupanandam	2,431	5.07	
Socialist	Jana Nageswararao	315	0.63	
Majority		3,332		
Turnout		48,018	73.89	
INC hold		Swing		

=== 1955 ===
1955 Andhra Pradesh Legislative Assembly election: Palakollu
Party	Candidate	Votes	%	±%
INC	Addepalli Satyanarayana Murthy	40,988		
CPI	B.Lakshmi Narasaraju	39,538		
Majority		1,450		
INC hold		Swing		

=== 1952 ===
1952 Madras Legislative Assembly election: Palakollu
Party	Candidate	Votes	%	±%
INC	Dasari Perumalla	40,052		
CPI	P.S.S Rao	35,520		
Majority		4,532		
INC hold		Swing		

== See also ==
- List of constituencies of the Andhra Pradesh Legislative Assembly
