= Pulaparthi Ramanjaneyulu =

Indian politician

Member of the Andhra Pradesh Legislative Assembly
- Incumbent
- Assumed office 4 June 2024
- Preceded by: Grandhi Srinivas
- Constituency: Bhimavaram
- In office 16 May 2009 — 23 May 2019
- Preceded by: Grandhi Srinivas
- Succeeded by: Grandhi Srinivas
- Constituency: Bhimavaram

Personal details
- Party: Jana Sena Party (from 2024)
- Other political affiliations: Telugu Desam Party (until 2024)
- Occupation: Politician

Pulaparthi Ramanjaneyulu (Anji Babu) is an Indian politician, belonging to the Janasena Party. Ramanjaneyulu is a former member of the Andhra Pradesh Legislative Assembly, representing the Bhimavaram constituency. He was a member of the Indian National Congress until 2014 when he worked as MLA from 2009 to 2014. He later contested and won as a member of legislative assembly from Telugu Desam Party in the 2014 elections. He lost his third election in 2019, but continued to work as in-charge of TDP in Bhimavaram constituency. On 11 March 2024 he joined the Janasena Party in presence of party chief, Pawan Kalyan.
