= Bhupathiraju Vijayakumar Raju =

Indian politician and industrialist

Member of Parliament, Lok Sabha
- In office 1984–1994
- Preceded by: Alluri Subhash Chandra Bose
- Succeeded by: Kothapalli Subbarayudu
- Constituency: Narasapur

Member of Legislative Assembly Andhra Pradesh
- In office 1967–1977
- Preceded by: Nachu Venkata Ramayya
- Succeeded by: Kalidindi Vijay Kumar Raju
- Constituency: Bhimavaram

Personal details
- Born: 17 September 1936 West Godavari, Andhra Pradesh
- Died: 20 November 1994 (aged 58)
- Party: Telugu Desam Party
- Spouse: Kantha Kamala Kasturi (m. 1954)
- Parent: Subba Tata Raju (father)
- As of Apr, 2014

Bhupathiraju Vijayakumar Raju (born 17 September 1936) was a politician and industrialist. He was also the founder of Delta Paper Mills established in 1975, situated at Vendra Village, West Godavari Dist., Andhra Pradesh.

== Political career ==
Vijayakumar Raju was a member of Bhimavaram Assembly Constituency in 1967–72 as Independent and 1972–77 from Congress Party.

He was member of the 8th Lok Sabha, 9th Lok Sabha and 10th Lok Sabha of India. He was elected to Lok Sabha consecutively 3 times. He represents the Narasapur Lok Sabha Constituency of Andhra Pradesh and is a member of the Telugu Desam Party (TDP).

Bhupatiraju Vijaya Kumar Raju and other TD MPs defied the party whip and voted for P.V.Narasimha Rao to save the minority Congress government in 1992 for a good reason and in the process invited the wrath of N.T.Rama Rao.

== See also ==
- Politics of Andhra Pradesh
