= Undi Assembly constituency =

Constituency of the Andhra Pradesh Legislative Assembly, India

Coordinates: 16.59°N 81.47°E

Undi
- Constituency No. 60 for the Andhra Pradesh Legislative Assembly
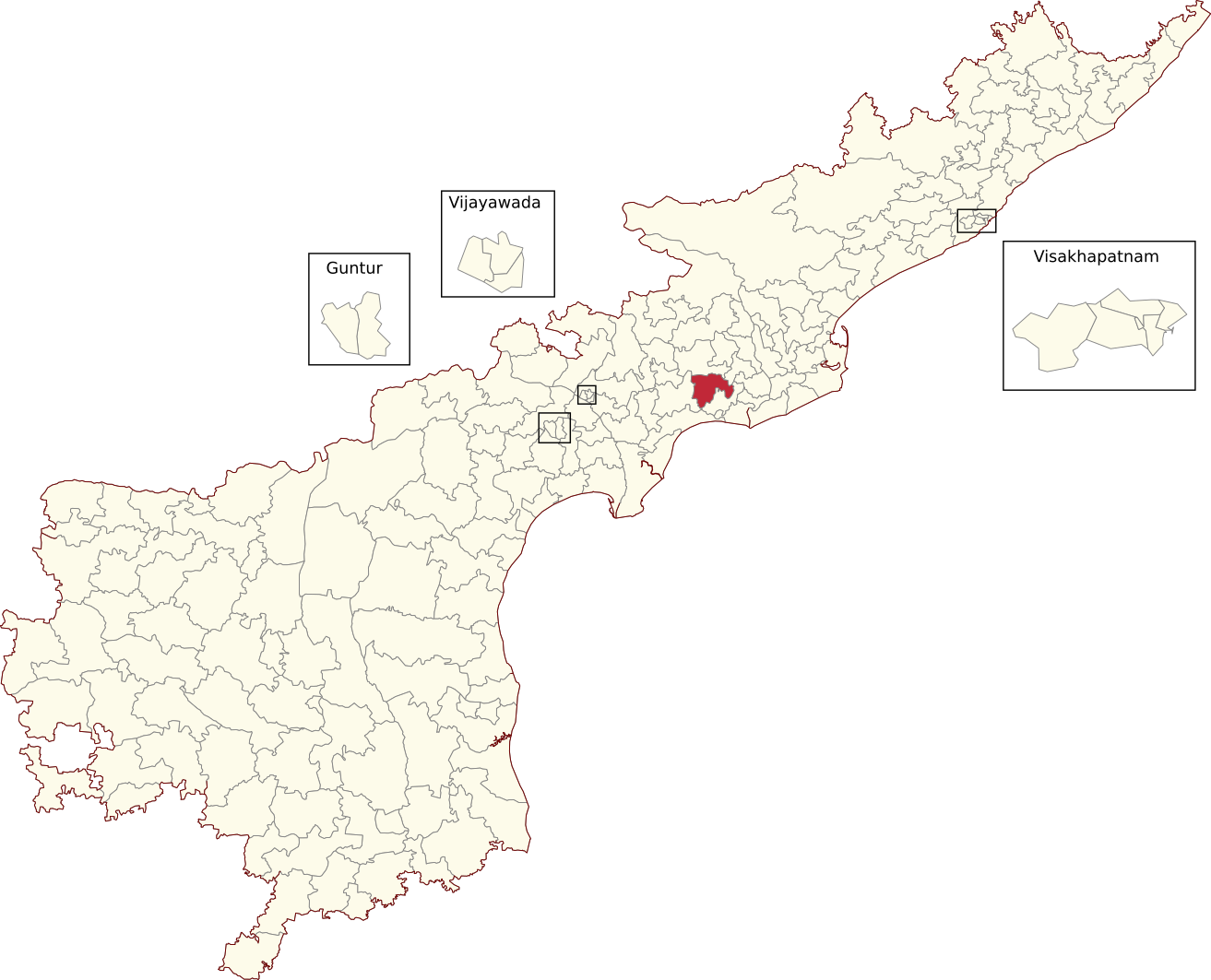
- Location of Undi Assembly constituency within Andhra Pradesh

Constituency details
- Country: India
- Region: South India
- State: Andhra Pradesh
- District: West Godavari
- Lok Sabha constituency: Narsapuram
- Established: 1951
- Total electors: 219,488
- Reservation: None

Member of Legislative Assembly
- 16th Andhra Pradesh Legislative Assembly
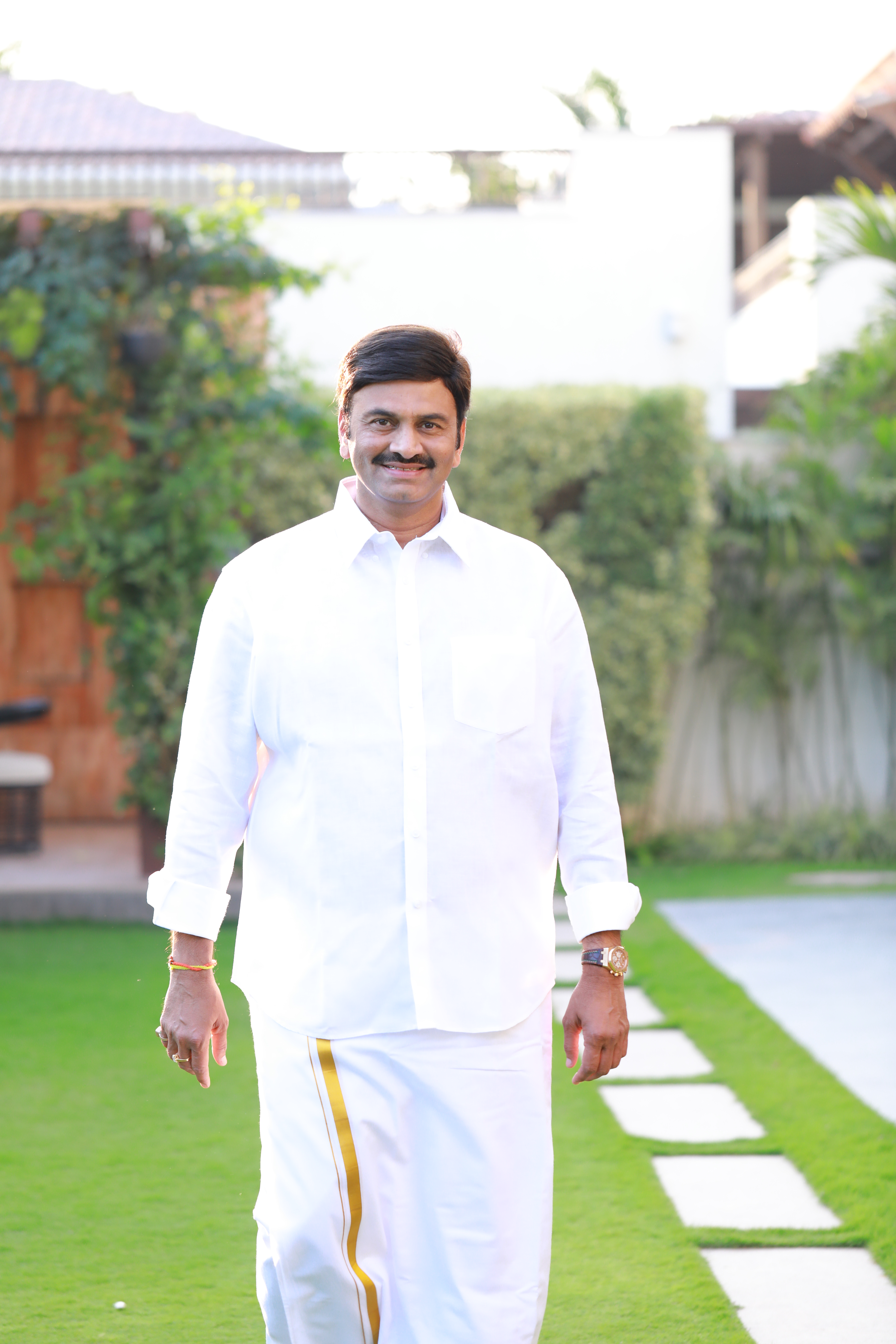
- Incumbent Raghu Rama Krishna Raju
- Party: TDP
- Alliance: NDA
- Elected year: 2024

Undi Assembly constituency is a constituency in West Godavari district of Andhra Pradesh that elects representatives to the Andhra Pradesh Legislative Assembly in India. It is one of the seven assembly segments of Narasapuram Lok Sabha constituency.

Most successful political parties
1. INC (5 terms) (29.4%)
2. TDP (9 terms) (52.9%)
3. INC(I) (1 term) (5.88%)
4. Independent (2 term) (11.8%)

Raghu Rama Krishna Raju is the current MLA of the constituency, having won the 2024 Andhra Pradesh Legislative Assembly election from Telugu Desam Party. As of 2019, there are a total of 219,488 electors in the constituency. The constituency was established in 1951, as per the Delimitation Orders (1951).

== Mandals ==
The five mandals that form the assembly constituency are:

Mandal
Kalla
Palacoderu
Undi
Akividu
Bhimavaram

== Members of the Legislative Assembly ==
Year	Member	Political party
1952	Dantuluri Narayana Raju	Indian National Congress
1955	Gadiraju Jagannadharaju	Indian National Congress
1962	Gokaraju Rangaraju	Indian National Congress
1967	K. K. Rao	Independent
1970 by-election	K. A. Gokaraju	Independent
1972	Danduboyiwa Perazah	Indian National Congress
1978	Gottumukkala Rama Chandraraju	Indian National Congress (I)
1983	Kalidindi Ramachandra Raju	Telugu Desam Party
1985	Kalidindi Ramachandra Raju	Telugu Desam Party
1989	Kalidindi Ramachandra Raju	Telugu Desam Party
1994	Kalidindi Ramachandra Raju	Telugu Desam Party
1999	Kalidindi Ramachandra Raju	Telugu Desam Party
2004	Pathapati Sarraju	Indian National Congress
2009	Vetukuri Venkata Siva Rama Raju	Telugu Desam Party
2014	Vetukuri Venkata Siva Rama Raju	Telugu Desam Party
2019	Mantena Rama Raju	Telugu Desam Party
2024	Raghu Rama Krishna Raju	Telugu Desam Party

== Election results ==
=== 2004 ===
2004 Andhra Pradesh Legislative Assembly election: Undi
Party	Candidate	Votes	%	±%
INC	Pathapati Sarraju	65,666	56.51	+25.43
TDP	Kalidindi Ramachandra Raju	46,178	39.74	−5.29
Majority		19,488	16.77	
Turnout		116,209	79.40	+9.70
INC gain from TDP		Swing		

=== 2009 ===
2009 Andhra Pradesh state assembly elections: Undi
Party	Candidate	Votes	%	±%
TDP	Vetukuri Venkata Siva Rama Raju (Kalavapudi Siva)	68,102	42.07	+2.33
INC	Pathapati Sarraju	52,534	32.34	−24.17
PRP	Pallaya Vanapalli	34,765	21.47	
Majority		15,568	9.73	
Turnout		161,888	88.10	+8.70
TDP gain from INC		Swing		

=== 2014 ===
2014 Andhra Pradesh Legislative Assembly election: Undi
Party	Candidate	Votes	%	±%
TDP	Vetukuri Venkata Siva Rama Raju (Kalavapudi Siva)	101,530	58.21	
YSRCP	Pathapati Sarraju	65299	37.44	
Majority		36,231	20.77	
Turnout		174,422	86.26	−1.84
TDP hold		Swing		

=== 2019 ===
2019 Andhra Pradesh Legislative Assembly election: Undi
Party	Candidate	Votes	%	±%
TDP	Mantena Rama Raju	82,730	44.46	
YSRCP	P. V. L. Narasimha Raju	71,781	38.58	
CPI	B Balarama Raju	24,737	13.29	
Majority		10,949	5.88	
Turnout		186,077	84.78	−1.48
TDP hold		Swing		

=== 2024 ===
2024 Andhra Pradesh Legislative Assembly election: Undi
Party	Candidate	Votes	%	±%
TDP	Raghu Rama Krishna Raju	116,902	59.80	
YSRCP	P. V. L. Narasimha Raju	60,125	30.76	
AIFB	Vetukuri Venkata Siva Rama Raju	13,260	6.78	
NOTA	None Of The Above	1,607	0.82	
Majority		56,777	29.04	
Turnout		1,95,472		
TDP hold		Swing		

== See also ==
- List of constituencies of the Andhra Pradesh Legislative Assembly
