= Nimmala Rama Naidu =

Indian politician (born 1969)

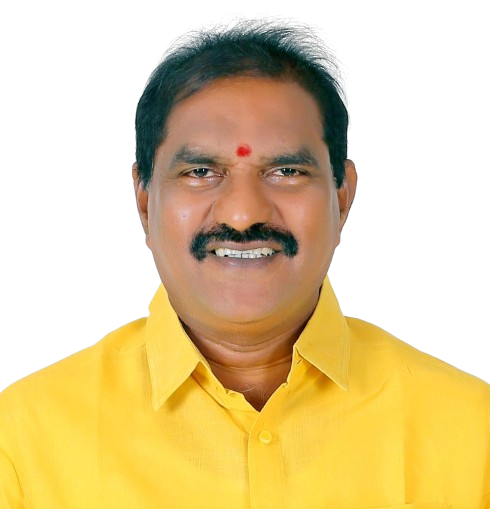
- Official portrait, 2024

Minister of Water Resources Development, Government of Andhra Pradesh
- Incumbent
- Assumed office 12 June 2024
- Governor: S. Abdul Nazeer
- Chief Minister: N. Chandrababu Naidu
- Preceded by: Ambati Rambabu

Member of Legislative Assembly, Andhra Pradesh
- Incumbent
- Assumed office 16 May 2014
- Preceded by: Bangaru Usha Rani
- Constituency: Palakollu

Personal details
- Born: 6 May 1969 (age 57) Agarthipalem village, Palakollu mandal, West Godavari district, Andhra Pradesh, India
- Party: Telugu Desam Party
- Spouse: Surya Kumari
- Children: 2
- Parents: Nimmala Dharma Rao (father); Ramamani (mother)
- Education: Andhra University (M.A.); Andhra University (M.Phil.); Andhra University (Ph.D. in Geography)
- Profession: Farmer; Teacher; Politician

Nimmala Rama Naidu (born 6 May 1969) is an Indian politician from Andhra Pradesh currently serving as the Minister of Water Resources Development in the Government of Andhra Pradesh. He has been a member of the Andhra Pradesh Legislative Assembly representing the Palakollu Assembly constituency since 2014, having won three consecutive elections in 2014, 2019, 2024. He is a member of the Telugu Desam Party.

== Early life ==
Nimmala Rama Naidu was born on 6 May 1969 in a Telugu Kapu family to Nimmala Dharma Rao and Ramamani in Agarthipalem village, Palakollu mandal, West Godavari district of Andhra Pradesh. He is married to Surya Kumari and the couple have a daughter and a son.

Rama Naidu completed his primary education in Agarthipalem village and pursued his degree at Sri Y N College in Narasapuram, where he worked as a teacher later. He then obtained a Master of Arts in 1992, a Master of Philosophy in 1995 and a Ph.D. in Geography in 2005 from Andhra University.

== Political career ==
Nimmala Rama Naidu started his political career with the Telugu Desam Party (TDP) and was elected as a councillor to Palakollu Municipality in 2005 and became its chairman in 2006, serving until 2009.

In 2014, Rama Naidu was elected as Member of the Legislative Assembly from the Palakollu Assembly constituency as a TDP candidate defeating YSR Congress Party (YSRCP) candidate Meka Seshu Babu by a margin of 6,383 votes. He was re-elected in 2019, defeating YSRCP candidate Ch. Satyanarayana Murty by a margin of 17,809 votes. In 2024, he won a third consecutive term defeating YSRCP candidate Gudala Srihari Gopala Rao by a margin of 67,945 votes. Following the formation of the TDP-led Kutami government, he was inducted into the Third N. Chandrababu Naidu ministry and is serving as the Minister of Water Resources Development.

== Electoral history ==
Election results
Year	Office	Constituency	Party	Votes	%	Opponent	Party	Votes	%	Result	Ref
2014	MLA	Palakollu	Telugu Desam Party	51,523	36.28	Meka Seshu Babu	YSR Congress Party	45,140	31.78	Won	
2019	MLA	Palakollu	Telugu Desam Party	67,549	43.18	Ch. Satyanarayana Murty	YSR Congress Party	48,740	31.80	Won	
2024	MLA	Palakollu	Telugu Desam Party	113,114	69.30	Gudala Srihari Gopala Rao	YSR Congress Party	45,169	27.67	Won	
