= Chegondi Harirama Jogaiah =

Indian politician (born 1937)

Member of Parliament, Lok Sabha
- In office 2 June 2004 – 6 November 2008
- Preceded by: Venkata Krishnam Raju Uppalapati
- Succeeded by: Kanumuri Bapiraju
- Constituency: Narasapur

Minister of Home Affairs Government of Andhra Pradesh
- In office 16 September 1984 - 8 March 1985
- Governor: Shankar Dayal Sharma; Kumudben Joshi
- Chief Minister: N. T. Rama Rao
- Preceded by: N. T. Rama Rao

Member of Legislative Assembly Andhra Pradesh
- In office 1989–1994
- Preceded by: Allu Venkata Satyanarayana
- Succeeded by: Allu Venkata Satyanarayana
- Constituency: Palakollu
- In office 1983–1989
- Preceded by: Parakala Seshavatharam
- Succeeded by: Allu Venkata Satyanarayana
- Constituency: Narasapuram
- In office 1972–1977
- Preceded by: Polisetty Seshavataram
- Succeeded by: Vardhimeedi Satyanarayana
- Constituency: Palakollu

Personal details
- Born: 5 April 1937 (age 89) Palakollu, Andhra Pradesh
- Party: Indian National Congress (1972-1983) (1989-2008); Telugu Desam Party (1983-1989); Praja Rajyam Party (2008-2012); YSR Congress Party (2012-2014)
- Spouse: Leelavathi
- Children: 5 sons
- As of 12 May, 2006

Chegondi Harirama Jogaiah (born 5 April 1937) is an Indian politician. He served as the Home Minister of Andhra Pradesh in the 1980s. He was a member of the 14th Lok Sabha (2004–2009) representing the Narasapuram constituency. He also served as an MLA four times — Palakollu for two terms in 1972 and 1989 and Narasapuram for two terms in 1983 and 1985.

Harirama Jogaiah resigned from Lok Sabha and Congress membership on 18 August 2008 and joined Praja Rajyam Party. Later, he resigned from Praja Rajyam Party and joined YSR Congress Party, and in March 2014 he resigned from YSR Congress Party. Now he is not active in politics.

Harirama Jogaiah released his political autobiography on 1 November 2015 titled "60 Vasantala Naa Rajakeeya Prasthanam" where he wrote all his political experiences till now. The book is released by NTR's daughter Daggubati Purandheswari and he dedicated his book to NTR. Film lyricist Anantha Sriram is his relative.
