= List of villages in Prakasam district =

This is an alphabetical list of villages in undivided Prakasam district that got restructured several times after 4 June 2022, Andhra Pradesh, India. For the current list of existing villages, see Category:Villages in Prakasam district

== A ==
- Adusumalli
- Alakurapadu
- Allur
- Amudalapalle
- Annangi
- Anubroluvaripalem
- Ardhaveedu
- Atchampeta
- Ayyaparaju Palem

== B ==
- B. Cherlopalli
- Badevaripalem
- Ballikurava
- Basireddipalle
- Basireddy Palem
- Bestavaripeta
- Bestavaripeta
- Bhairavakona
- Buddapalli

== C ==
- Chalappalem
- Chandaluru
- Chandrasekharapuram
- Chekurapadu
- Cherlo Donakonda
- Cheruvu Kommu Palem, Darsi mandal
- Cheruvu Kommu Palem, Ongole mandal
- Chilakapadu
- Chimakurthy
- Chinaganjam
- Chinavenkannapalem
- Chinthagumpalli
- Chodavaram

== D–E ==
- Darsi
- Davaguduru
- Devarapalem
- Dhenuva Konda
- Diguvametta
- Doddavaram
- Dornala
- Dupadu
- East Choutapalem
- Edumudi
- Elurivari palem
- Ethamukkala

== G–J ==
- G.Kothapalli
- Gajjala Konda
- Gamgam Palli
- Ganapavaram
- Gowtavaram
- Gudluru
- Hanumanthunipadu
- Inkollu
- Irasalagundam
- Janakavaram Panguluru
- Juvvigunta

== K ==
- K. Rajupalem
- Kambaladinne
- Kammavaripalem
- Kandukur
- Karamchedu
- Karavadi
- Karedu
- Keerthivaripalem
- Kolalapudi
- Komarolu
- Komminenivaripalem
- Konakanamitla
- Kondamanjulur
- Kondamuru
- Kondapi
- Konidena
- Kopperapalem
- Koppole
- Korisapadu
- Koru Uppalapadu
- Kotha Palem
- Kotha Reddy Palem
- Kothapatnam
- Kovilampadu
- Kovur
- Kunchepalli
- Kunkalamarru
- Kurichedu

== L–M ==
- Lingasamudram
- Maddipadu
- Malakonda
- Mallavaram
- Manduvavaripalem
- Manikeswaram
- Marripudi
- Martur
- Medarametla
- Meerjapeta
- Metlavaripalem
- Mottu Palle
- Mugachintala
- Mukthapuram
- Mundlamuru
- Muppalla
- Murugummi
- Mynampadu

== N–O ==
- Nagandla
- Nagulapalem
- Naguluppalapadu
- Nakkalapalem
- Nekunam Puram
- Nidamanur
- Obannapalem

== P ==
- P.Naidu Palem
- Padarthi
- Pajarla
- Pakala
- Palugunti palli
- Palukuru
- Pamidipadu
- Pamuru
- Parchur
- Peda Araveedu
- Peda Bommalapuram
- Pedacherlopalle
- Pernamitta
- Pokuru
- Ponduru
- Ponnaluru
- Pothukatla
- Pullalacheruvu
- Punugodu

== R ==
- Rachavaripalem
- Racherla
- Rajampalli
- Ramayapalem, Marripudi
- Ramayapalem, Peda Araveedu
- Ramayapatnam
- Ravinuthala
- Rayavaram (Markapur mandal)
- Reddicherla
- Rudravaram

Rajanagaram

== S ==
- Sakhavaram
- Santhamaguluru
- Santhanuthalapadu
- Seelamvaripalli
- Singanna Palem
- Singarakonda
- Sudivari palem

== T–U ==
- T. Naidu Palem
- Takkellapadu
- Talamalla
- Tangutur
- Tarlupadu
- Tellapadu
- Thallur
- Themidithapadu
- Thimmasamudram
- Tripuranthakam
- Ulavapadu
- Uppugundur
- Uppumaguluru

== V–Z ==
- V. Kopperapadu
- V. R. Kota
- Vaggampalli
- Valaparla
- Vallur
- Veerannapalem
- Veligandla
- Vellalacheruvu
- Venkata Raju Palem
- Venkatachalam Palli
- Venkatapuram
- Vennuru
- Vinjanampadu
- Vinodarayunipalem
- Voletivaripalem
- Yeddanapudi
- Yendluru
- Yerragondapalem
- Yerrobana Palle
- Zarugumilli
