= Badevaripalem =

Badevaripalem Nekunampuram at Pokuru(Revenue)
- Village
- Location in Andhra Pradesh, India
- Coordinates: 15.1922°N 79.8387°E
- Country: India
- State: Andhra Pradesh
- District: Prakasam

Government
  - Type: Democratic
  - Body: Panchayat

Population (2011)
  - Total: 7,870 (Nekunampuram@pokur)

Languages
  - Official: Telugu
- Time zone: UTC+5:30 (IST)
- PIN: 523113
- Vehicle registration: AP27(Old) & AP39(New for all vehicles in Andhra Pradesh)

Badevaripalem is a village located in Voletivaripalem mandal of Prakasam district in Andhra Pradesh.

It is located 12km from the mandal headquarters Voletivaripalem and 8km from the nearest town Kandukur. Badevaripalem Village is a Panchayat and is a part of Nekunampuram@Pokur Revenue Village.
