= Ramayapalem =

Ramayapalem may refer to either of two villages in Prakasam district of Andhra Pradesh state, India:

- Ramayapalem, Marripudi, in Marripudi mandal
- Ramayapalem, Peda Araveedu, in Peda Araveedu mandal
