= Davaguduru =

Coordinates: 15.319°N 79.944°E

Davagudur is a village in Zarugumilli Mandal in Prakasam district of Andhra Pradesh State, India.
