= Yendluru =

- Village
- Interactive map of Yendluru
- Location in Andhra Pradesh, India Yendluru (India)
- Coordinates: 15.557000°N 79.969000°E
- Country: India
- State: Andhra Pradesh
- District: Prakasam
- Elevation: 105 m (344 ft)

Languages
  - Official: Telugu
- Time zone: UTC+5:30 (IST)
- PIN: 523225
- Telephone code: 08592-
- Vehicle registration: AP 27
- Lok Sabha constituency: Bapatla
- Vidhan Sabha constituency: Santhanuthala padu

Yendluru is located in the Santhanuthala padu Mandal of Prakasam District in Andhra Pradesh, India.
