= Chekurapadu =

- village
- Interactive map of Chekurapadu
- Location in Andhra Pradesh, India
- Coordinates: 15°35′0″N 80°5′0″E
- Country: India
- State: Andhra Pradesh
- District: Prakasam

Languages
  - Official: Telugu
- Time zone: UTC+5:30 (IST)
- Postal code: 523262
- Telephone code: +91–8592
- Vehicle registration: AP-27
- Lok Sabha constituency: Ongole
- Nearest city: Ongole

Chekurapadu is a village in Naguluppalapadu mandal of Prakasam district in Andhra Pradesh, India. Tobacco is one the major crops cultivated in the village.
