= G. Kothapalli =

- Village
- Interactive map of G. Kothapalli
- Location in Andhra Pradesh, India G. Kothapalli (India)
- Country: India
- State: Andhra Pradesh
- District: Prakasam
- Mandal: Racherla

Population (2011)
  - Total: 5,071

Languages
  - Official: Telugu
- Time zone: UTC+5:30 (IST)
- Vehicle registration: AP

G. Kothapalli is a village in Prakasam district of the Indian state of Andhra Pradesh. It is located in Racherla mandal. The "G" in the name of village of stands for neighbouring village Gudimetta.
