= Chandaluru =

- village
- Interactive map of Chandaluru
- Location in Andhra Pradesh, India Chandaluru (India)
- Coordinates: 15.784651°N 80.139716°E
- Country: India
- State: Andhra Pradesh
- District: Prakasam
- Mandal: Janakavaram Panguluru

Government
  - Type: gram panchayats
  - Body: Chandaluru Gram Panchayat
  - Sarpanch: Pentyala Venkata Krishna Rao

Population
  - Total: 6,000

Languages
  - Official: Telugu
- Time zone: UTC+5:30 (IST)
- PIN: 523214
- Telephone code: +91–8593
- Vehicle registration: AP27

Chandaluru is a village in the Janakavaram Panguluru mandal of Prakasam district of the Indian state of Andhra Pradesh. This village was well known for communist movements and protests against inequality and justice.

This village has temples built by Cholas and Krishna devaraya. One of the prominent temples with ancient significance is Chennakesava Temple. Every year, probably one or two days, the sun rays directly touch the foot of the chennakesava idol which is located at the heart of the temple. Shivalayam in this village also has great historical importance of 3000 years. This temple is present at the center of the lake surrounded by water. Siva lingam in this temple was swayambu. Great Mahalakshmi ammavaru kolupulu in this village is a special attraction. These are held with great devotion and a lot of crowd is seen at the temple during Sankranti festival time. Cultural activities are held every day.
