= Marripudi =

Marripudi may refer to:

- Marripudi, Guntur, India
- Marripudi, Prakasam, India
