= Palukuru =

Palukuru is a village in the Kandukur mandal of the Prakasam district, from the state of Andhra Pradesh, India, located 33 kilometers south of district headquarters Ongole.

Palukur is a large village located in Banaganapalle Mandal of Kurnool district, Andhra Pradesh with total 2800 families residing. The Palukur village has population of 11674 of which 5839 are males while 5835 are females as per Population Census 2011.

The pin code of Palukuru is 523101 and its postal head office is S. Konda, or Singarayakonda.

The 5 villages that surround Palukuru are Oguru (4 km (2.5 mi)), Vikkiralapeta (4 km (2.5 mi)), Nandanavanam (5 km (3.1 mi)), Kondikandukur (5 km (3.1 mi)), Kanumalla (6 km (3.7 mi)).

Kandukur, Ongole and Kavali are cities that are in close proximity to Palukuru.

It is close to the Bay of Bengal and the weather is humid most of the time. The locals speak Telugu & Urdu.

- Households: 1,436
- Total Population: 5,849
- Male Population: 2,998
- Female Population: 2,849

== Places of Worship ==
- 2 Sri Rama Temples
- 4 Ankamma Talli Temples
- Veerabadraswami Temple
- Veera Brahmendra Swami Temple
- Poleramma Temple
- Mavullamma Temple
- Nagarpamma
- Devara Amma Gudi
- Lord Vishnu Temple
- Ankammatalli Temple
- Chenna Keshvaswamy Temple
- Gangamma Talli
- Lord Shiva Temple
- Sri Ayyappa Swamy Temple
- Renuka Ammavaru
- 2 Anjaneya statues
- 2 churches
- A mosque
- Brahmakumari samajam

The 24-hour Bajana & Palukur Ayyaswami Bajana, are famous in this village.

== Schools ==
- Anganvaadi Schools (Pindi Badi)
- Elementary School (Chinna badi)
- Zpph School (Pedda badi)
- Kerala English Medium School
- Mpp Schools

The village has an average literacy rate of 45.5.

=== Sport ===
The village is famous for these sports and competitions:

- Ball badminton
- Kabaddi
- Kho-Kho
- Cricket
- Volleyball
- Shuttle

== Festivals ==
- Makar Sankranti
- Vinayaka Chathurthi
- Maha Shivaratri
- Kaarthika Paurnami
- Ramadan
- Christmas
- Deepavali
- Kolupulu

== Transport ==
By road: Kandukur is the nearest town to Palukur at a distance of 11 km (6.8 mi). Road connectivity is present from Kandukur to Palukur.

By rail: Singarayakonda railway station is the closest railway station to Palukur.

By bus: Jarugumalli APSRTC Bus Station, Kandukur APSRTC Bus Station and Singaraya Konda APSRTC Bus Station are the nearest bus stations to Palukur. APSRTC runs several buses from major cities to here.

== Demographics ==
In the 2001 India census, Palukuru had a population of 2,100. Males constitute 50.08% of the population and females 49.19%. The village has an average literacy rate of 41.5. The literacy rate of males in the village is 72%, while that of females is 55%.
