= Basireddipalle =

Basireddypalli
- Village
- Nicknames: Baireddy Palle, Basireddy Palli
- Interactive map of Basireddypalli
- Location in Andhra Pradesh, India Basireddypalli (India)
- Coordinates: 15.788600°N 79.591183°E
- Country: India
- State: Andhra Pradesh
- District: Prakasam
- Founder: Basireddy
- Talukas: Darsi

Government
  - Body: Panchayat

Area
  - Total: 1 km^{2} (0.39 sq mi)

Population (2011)
  - Total: 1,028
  - Density: 1,000/km^{2} (2,700/sq mi)

Languages
  - Official: Telugu
- Time zone: UTC+5:30 (IST)
- PIN: 523304
- Telephone code: 08407

Basireddypalli is a Gram panchayat located in Darsi mandal of Prakasam district of Andhra Pradesh, India.

== Geography ==
Basireddy Palli is located towards 12 km (7.5 mi) on the west side of Darsi.

== Assembly constituency ==
Darsi is an assembly constituency in Andhra Pradesh, one of 12 in Prakasham district. In last elections, TDP candidate Sidda Raghava Rao won by a margin of 1374 votes on Buchepalli Siva Prasad Reddy. Dirisala Ramanareddy was first Chairman of Prakasam Zilla Parishad in 1970 till his last days.
