= Kammavaripalem, Prakasam district =

Kammavaripalem
- Village
- Interactive map of Kammavaripalem
- Location in Andhra Pradesh, India
- Coordinates: 15.316981°N 79.906850°E
- Country: India
- State: Andhra Pradesh
- District: Prakasam
- Mandal: kandukur
- Talukas: Kandukur

Population
  - Total: 567 (approx)

Languages
  - Official: Telugu
- Time zone: UTC+5:30 (IST)
- PIN: 523271
- Telephone code: 08598-2*****

Kammavaripalem is a village in Kandukur mandal, Prakasam district of the Indian state of Andhra Pradesh.
