= Rajampalli =

- Revenue Village
- Interactive map of Rajampalli
- Location of Rajampalli
- Coordinates: 15.707627°N 79.660034°E
- Country: India
- State: Andhra Pradesh
- District: Prakasam district
- Zone: Darsi

Government

Population (2011)
  - Total: 3,919
  - Number of men: 2,004
  - Number of women: 1,915
- PIN code: 523 247
- STD code: 08407

Rajampalli is a village in Darsi Mandal, Prakasam district. It is about 6 km (3.7 mi) from Mandala District. It is located at a distance of 56 km (35 mi) from the nearby town of Ongole. According to the 2011 Census of India, this village has a population of 970 and spread over 1289 hectares with a population of 3919. The number of men and women in this village were 2004 and 1915. The number of scheduled castes was 1830 while the scheduled tribes were 112.

== Educational facilities ==
There are three public primary schools in the village, one of them is a government primary school and a government secondary school.

There is one primary school is nearby Darsi.

Near the Junior College, there is one Darsilonu Government Arts and Science Degree College and Engineering Chemistry College. The nearest medical college is in Guntur, in the Polytechnic suburb.

== Statistics ==
Population (2011) - Total 3,919 - Number of Men 2,004 - Number of Women 1,915 - Number of Housing 970

As of the 2001 census population of the village was 3,329. There are 1,688 men, 1,641 for women, and 718 residences in this village. It has a total area of 1,289 hectares. The alumni is Srihari Bathini who moved to California.
