= Karedu =

Village in Sri Potti Sriramulu district, Andhra Pradesh, India

Coordinates: 15°11′N 80°04′E

Karedu is a village panchayat located in Ulavapadu, Prakasam District, Andhra Pradesh, India.

Karedu comes under Kandukur (Assembly constituency) and It is part of the Nellore Lok Sabha constituency.

== Language ==
The local language is Telugu.

== Sub-villages in Karedu ==
- Alagayapalem
- Kotha pallipalem
- Upparapalem
- Vaka
- Bangaru palem
- Battisomaiah Pattapupalem
- Pollukatta Yanadisangam
- Akuthota Yanadisangam
- SC Colony
- Tenkayachetlapalem
- Pathachinapallepalem
- Chinapallepalem
- Indiranagar Yanadi Colony
- Ramakrishnapuram
- Pedapallipalem
