= Seelamvaripalli =

- Village
- Country: India
- State: Andhra Pradesh
- District: Prakasam
- Mandal: Chandrasekharapuram

Languages
  - Official: Telugu
- Time zone: UTC+5:30 (IST)
- PIN: 523112

Seelamvaripalli is a village in Prakasam district of the Indian state of Andhra Pradesh. It is located in Chandrasekharapuram mandal of Kandukur revenue division.

The village is the location for Kadiri Babu Rao College of Agriculture. he village is the location for Muram narayana reddy.
