= Meerjapeta =

Coordinates: 15°38′13″N 79°11′52″E

Meerjapeta, also rendered as Meer Japeta is a village in the Tarlupadu mandal of the Prakasam district of the Indian state of Andhra Pradesh.

At the 2001 census, the village had 1,568 inhabitants.
