= Mottu Palle =

Location of Mottu Palle in India.

Mottu Palle is a village in Komarolu mandal Prakasam district of the Indian state of Andhra Pradesh. Mottu Palle is 9 km (5.6 mi) from Komarolu

== Geography ==
Mottu Palle is located at 15.2254°N 78.9556°E. It has an average elevation of 250 metres (820.21 feet)

== Demographics ==
According to the Indian census, 2011, the demographic details of Mottu Palle Village is as follows:

- Total Population: 415 in 118 Households.
- Male Population:211 and Female Population: 214
- Total Literates:47.54%
