= Anubroluvaripalem =

- Village
- Interactive map of Anubroluvaripalem
- Location in Andhra Pradesh, India
- Coordinates: 15°41′14″N 80°06′16″E
- Country: India
- State: Andhra Pradesh
- District: Prakasam
- Mandal: Korisapadu

Languages
  - Official: Telugu
- Time zone: UTC+5:30 (IST)
- PIN: 523213

Anubroluvaripalem (also known as Anubrolu Vari Palem) is a village in Korisapadu mandal, Prakasam district of the Indian state of Andhra Pradesh.

== Political affairs ==
It has no panchayati and it comes under the Pamidipadu panchayathi, which covers a total of five villages nearby. The pamidipadu is 4 km away from Anubroluvaripalem. So for all five villages a president will be elected at the time of elections. As of 2017, the president of all five villages is Mr. Sridhar.

== Population ==
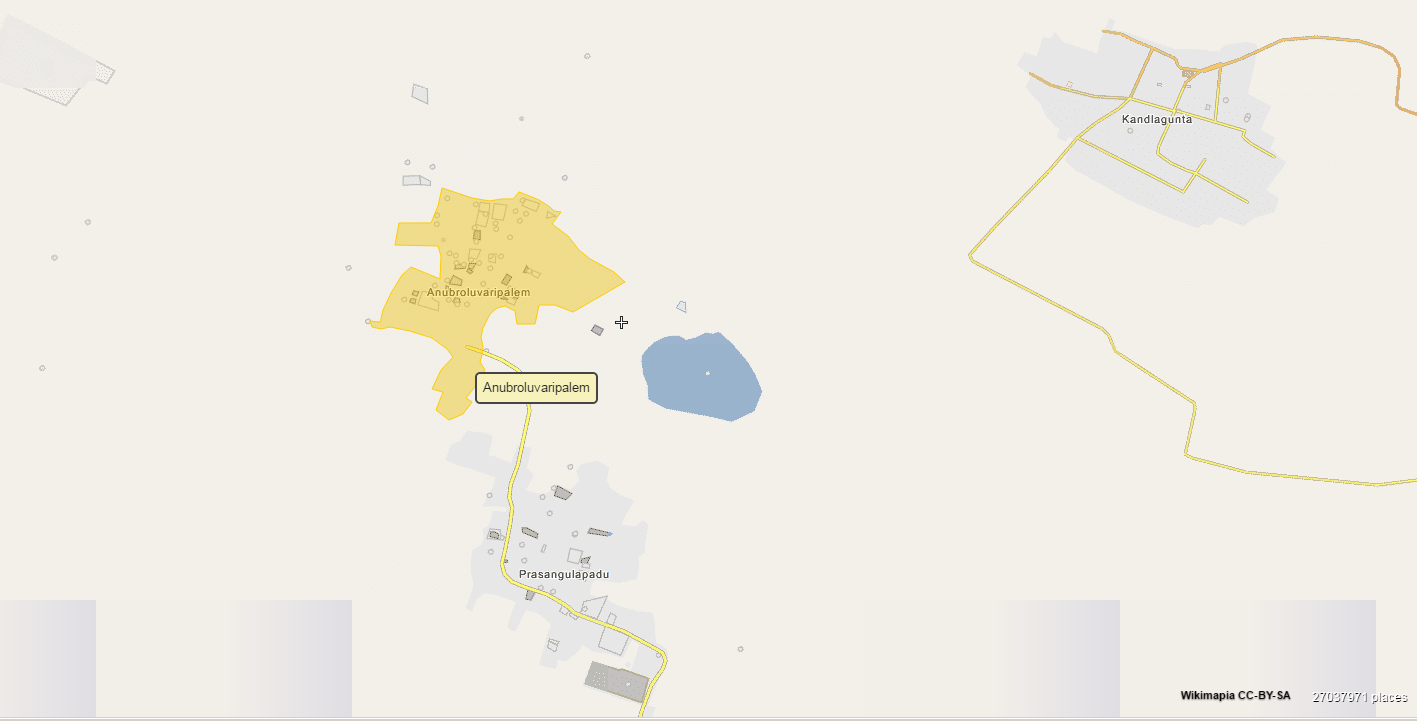
Anubroluvaripalem

Anubrolu Vari Palem starts with a temple followed by the houses. It is a good looking village with cement roads and greenery. Usually people, who are living in the village, live from agriculture and some from local business and jobs. Most of them are very old, as their children were settled somewhere, because of their particular jobs. They encouraged their parents to leave the village and to go with them, but the people refused to leave the village.

So their children come to their parents on festivals and for some occasions. They used to celebrate the festivals with their parents and also with the people in the village. Especially, the Sankranthi festival, which was celebrated in the month of January was celebrated in a grand manner where all the people, who are living in various cities come to the village to enjoy with their parents. The entire village celebrates combinedly by conducting various sports for all categories of the people.

== Infrastructure ==
=== Water Supply ===
Water is supplied by a ground level storage reservoir and a sub-surface source.

=== Schools ===
Education is provided by Mpps Anubroluvari Palem School and Sudha Residential School. The present school in the village is declared as a model school and the works are going on to make it a full-pledged government model school.

== Notable people ==
- Somaiah Panthulu, teacher
