= Edumudi =

- Village
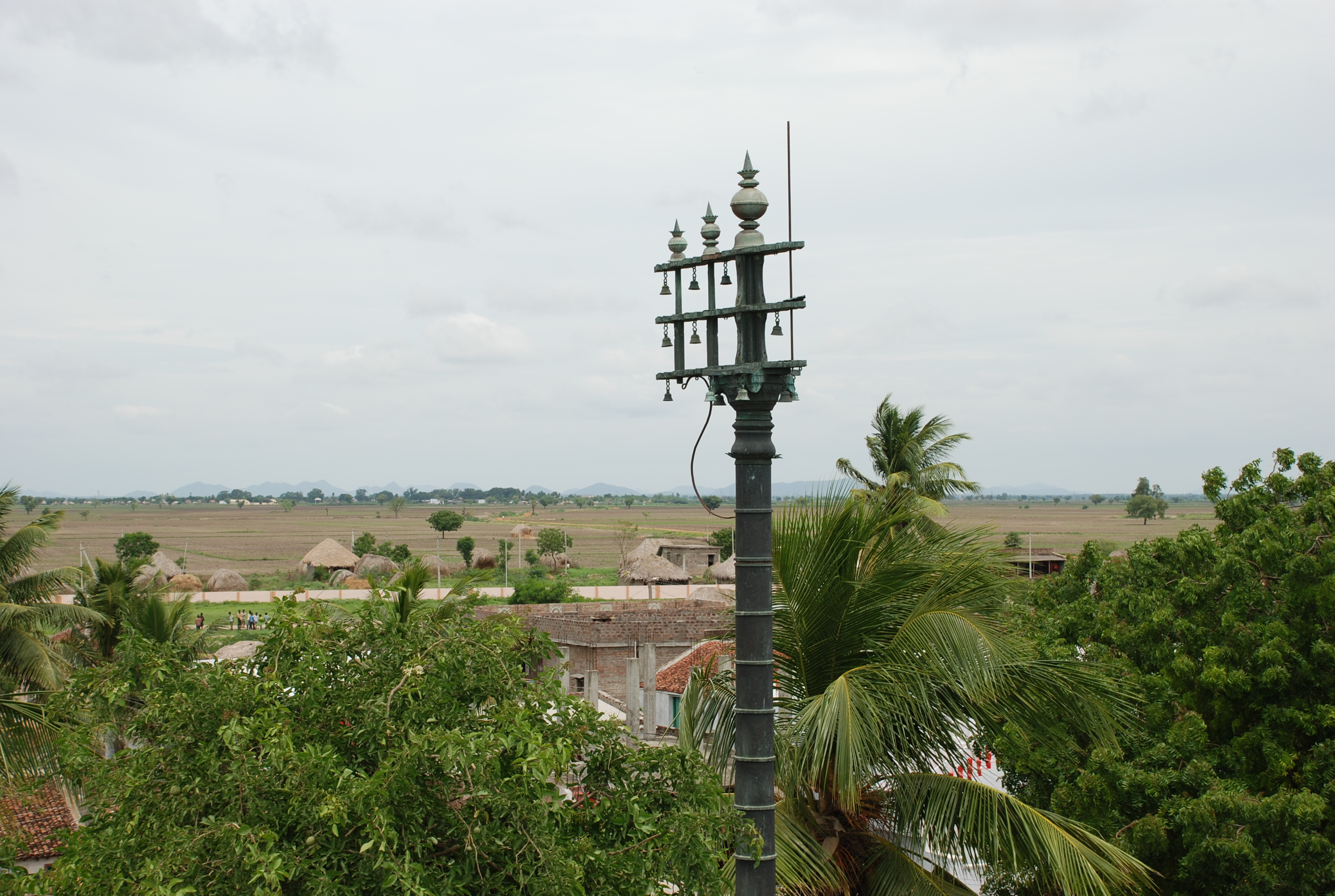
- Interactive map of Edumudi
- Coordinates: 15.7299°N 80.1708°E
- Country: India
- State: Andhra Pradesh
- District: Prakasam

Government
  - Type: Panchayathi

Languages
  - Official: Telugu
- Time zone: UTC+5:30 (IST)
- Lok Sabha constituency: Bapatla (SC)
- Vidhan Sabha constituency: Santhanuthalapadu

Edumudi is a village in Prakasam district of the Indian state of Andhra Pradesh. It is located in Naguluppalapadu mandal of Tenali revenue division.
