= Murugummi =

Coordinates: 15°15′N 79°37′E

Murugummi is a small village is located in the taluk of Pedacherlopalle, Prakasam district of Andhrapradesh, India. The 2011 Census recorded 1,884 people in 388 households. There were 230 children aged 0–6. The reported sex ratio was about 979 females per 1,000 males
