= Thallur, Prakasam district =

Tallur
- Village
- Interactive map of Tallur
- Location in Andhra Pradesh, India Tallur (India)
- Coordinates: 15.736880°N 79.882534°E
- Country: India
- State: Andhra Pradesh
- District: Prakasam
- Mandal: Tallur
- Talukas: Tallur

Government
  - Type: Panchayati raj (India)
  - Body: Gram panchayat

Languages
  - Official: Telugu
- Time zone: UTC+5:30 (IST)
- PIN: 523264
- Vehicle registration: AP

Tallur (also spelled (not commonly) as Thallur) is a village in Prakasam district of the Indian state of Andhra Pradesh. It is the mandal headquarters of Tallur mandal in Kandukur revenue division.
