= Obannapalem =

- Village
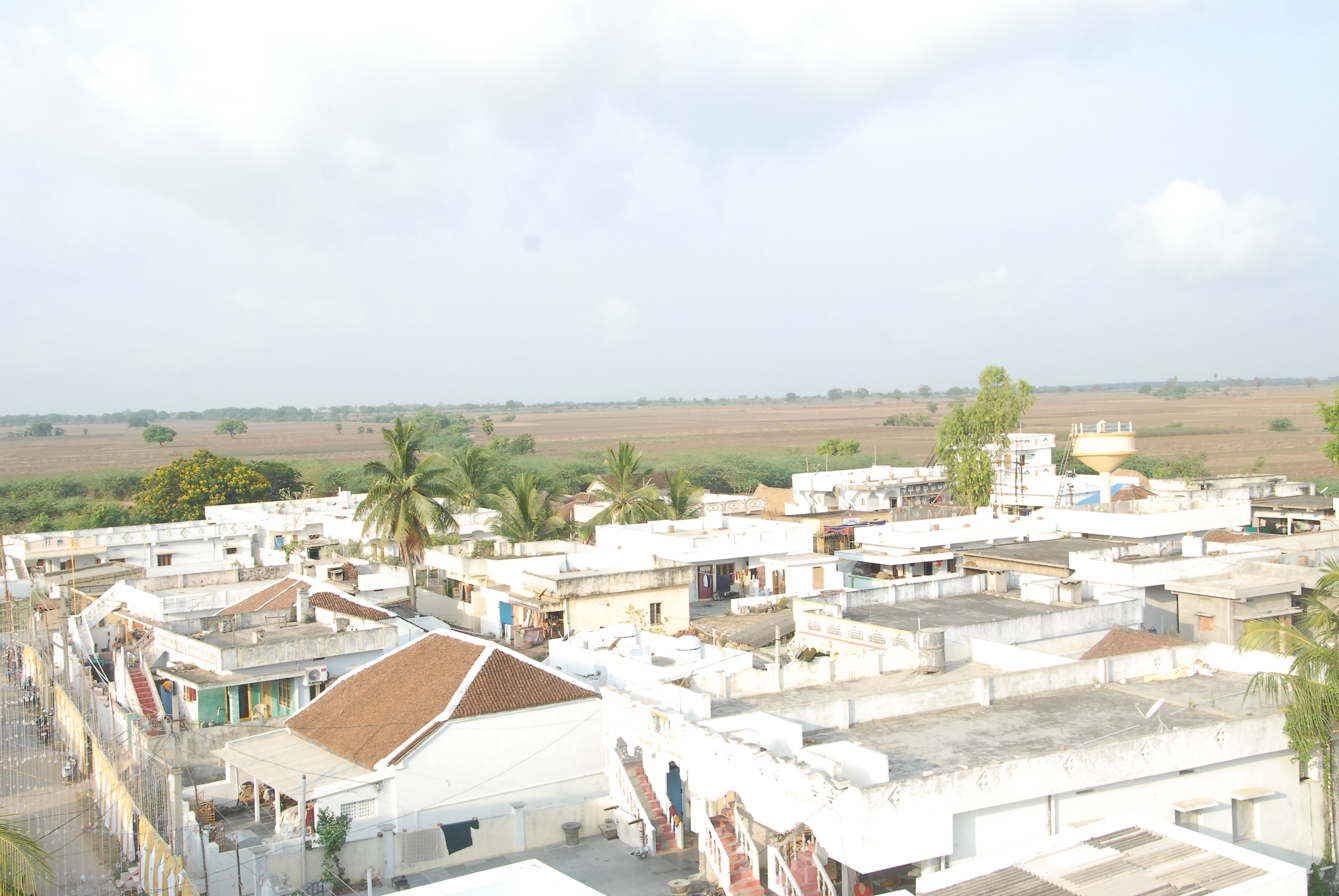
- Obannapalem
- Interactive map of Obannapalem
- Location within Andhra Pradesh
- Coordinates: 15.5°N 80.05°E
- Country: India
- State: Andhra Pradesh
- District: Prakasam

Languages
  - Official: Telugu
- Time zone: UTC+5:30 (IST)
- PIN: 523183
- Telephone code: (+91)8592
- Lok Sabha constituency: Bapatla
- Assembly constituency: Santhanuthalapadu

Obannapalem is a village in Naguluppalapadu Mandal in Prakasam District of Andhra Pradesh State, India. It belongs to Andhra region.
