= Kovilampadu =

- village
- Interactive map of Kovilampadu
- Country: India
- State: Andhra Pradesh
- District: Prakasam
- Talukas: Kanigiri

Languages
  - Official: Telugu
- Time zone: UTC+5:30 (IST)
- PIN: 523112

Kovilam Padu is a village in Chandrasekharapuram (C.S. Puram) Mandal of Prakasam district in the state of Andhra Pradesh in India.
