= Alakurapadu =

- Village
- Interactive map of Alakurapadu
- Location in Andhra Pradesh, India Alakurapadu (India)
- Coordinates: 15.362°N 80.068°E
- Country: India
- State: Andhra Pradesh
- District: Prakasam

Government
  - Member of Parliament: Magunta Sreenivasulu Reddy
  - Member of Legislative Assembly: Dola Bala Veeranjaneya Swamy

Languages
  - Official: Telugu
- Time zone: UTC+5:30 (IST)
- PIN: 523274
- Nearest city: Ongole
- Lok Sabha constituency: Ongole
- Assembly constituency: Kondapi (SC)

Alakurapadu is a village in Prakasam District of the Indian state of Andhra Pradesh. It is located in Tangutur mandal of Ongole revenue division.
