= Yerrobana Palle =

Yerraobana Palle
- Village
- Interactive map of Yerraobana Palle
- Location within Andhra Pradesh
- Coordinates: 15.7544496°N 79.5716572°E
- Country: India
- State: Andhra Pradesh
- District: Prakasam district
- Mandal: Darsi

Area
  - Total: 5 km^{2} (1.9 sq mi)

Population
  - Total: 1,520

Languages
  - Official: Telugu
- Time zone: UTC+5:30 (IST)
- PIN: 523304

Yerrobana Palle (also known as Yerraobana Palli) is a village in the town of Darsi in the Prakasam district of Andhra Pradesh, India.
