= Kovvur (disambiguation) =

Kovvur is a town in West Godavari district, Andhra Pradesh, India.

It may also refer to:

- Kovur, Prakasam district, a village in Prakasam district, Andhra Pradesh, India
- Kovvur revenue division, a revenue division in the West Godavari district, Andhra Pradesh, India
- Kovvur mandal, a mandal in West Godavari district, Andhra Pradesh, India
- Kovvur railway station, a railway station in West Godavari district, Andhra Pradesh, India
- Kovur, a village in Nellore district, Andhra Pradesh, India
