= Sakhavaram =

- Village
- Interactive map of Sakhavaram
- Location in Andhra Pradesh, India
- Coordinates: 15.1453°N 79.8123°E
- Country: India
- State: Andhra Pradesh
- District: Prakasam
- Mandal: Voletivaripalem
- Time zone: UTC+05:30 (IST)
- Pincode: 523113

Sakhavaram is a village in Voletivaripalem mandal of Prakasam District, Andhra Pradesh, India.

== Geography ==
Nearest town is Kandukur to which it has road connectivity. It comes under Voletivaripalem mandal. Its pincode is 523113.

== Population ==
Sakhavaram village has population of 2992 of which 1454 are males while 1538 are females as per Population Census 2011 with 728 families residing in total.

== Administration ==
As per constitution of India and Panchayati Raj Act, Sakhavaram village is administrated by Sarpanch (Head of Village) who is elected representative of village.

== School ==
There are 3 MPPS and 1 ZPHS schools located in Sakhavaram.

== Banking ==
There is branch of Indian Bank located in the village.
