= Kovur =

Kovur may refer to:

- Kovvur, West Godavari district, a town in West Godavari district, Andhra Pradesh, India
- Kovur, Nellore district, a town in Nellore district, Andhra Pradesh, India
- Kovur, Prakasam district, a village in Prakasam district, Andhra Pradesh, India
- Kovur, Chennai, a town in Kanchipuram district, Tamil Nadu, India
