= Amudalapalle =

- Village
- Interactive map of Amudalapalle
- Location in Andhra Pradesh, India
- Coordinates: 15.612194°N 79.651439°E
- Country: India
- State: Andhra Pradesh
- District: Markapuram
- Mandal: Podili

Population (2011)
  - Total: 572
- Time zone: UTC+05:30 (IST)
- Pincode: 523253

Amudalapalle is a village in Podili mandal, located in Markapuram district of Andhra Pradesh in India.
