= Vellalacheruvu =

Coordinates: 16°08′N 79°53′E

Vellalacheruvu is a village panchayat located in the Prakasam district of Andhra Pradesh state, India.

== Demographics ==
Telugu is the local language here. The total population of Vellalacheruvu is 6487. There are 3428 males and 3,059 females living in 1429 houses. The total area of Vellalacheruvu is 1902 hectares. A sex ratio of 960 females per 1000 males. The average literacy rate stands at 72.00%.

== Economy ==
The major source of income is through farming Rice, Chillis, Cotton and other major paddy fields. Moreover, there are couple of government offices are located in this village like Central Bank of India, Farmers Society, Schools and hospitals.
