= Ponduru, Prakasam district =

Ponduru
- Village
- Interactive map of Ponduru
- Location in Andhra Pradesh, India Ponduru (India)
- Coordinates: 15.4167°N 79.9333°E
- Country: India
- State: Andhra Pradesh
- District: Prakasam
- Talukas: Tanguturu

Languages
  - Official: Telugu
- Time zone: UTC+5:30 (IST)
- PIN: 523273
- Telephone code: 08592-

For a village and mandal in Srikakulam, see Ponduru.

Ponduru is a village in Tanguturu mandal of Prakasam district in Andhra Pradesh, India.

== Geography ==
Ponduru is located at 15.4167°N 79.9333°E. It has an average elevation of 11 meters (39 feet).
