= Venkata Raju Palem =

Venkata raju palem
- village
- Interactive map of Venkata raju palem
- Location in Andhra Pradesh, India Venkata raju palem (India)
- Coordinates: 15.5°N 80.05°E
- Country: India
- State: Andhra Pradesh

Languages
  - Official: Telugu
- Time zone: UTC+5:30 (IST)

Venkata Raju Palem is a village in Maddipadu mandal, Prakasam district, Andhara Pradesh state in India.

== Geography ==
Venkata raju palem is located at 15.5° N 80.05° E. It has an average elevation of 10 metres (32 feet).

== Demographics ==
As of 2001 India census, Venkata raju palem had a population of 589. Males constitute 51% of the population and females 49%. Venkata raju palem has a sound literacy rate of 99%, higher than the national average of 59.5%: male literacy is 100%, and female literacy is 99%. In Venkata raju palem, 15% of the population is under 6 years of age.
