= East Choutapalem =

Petlur Chowtapalem
- village
- Interactive map of Petlur Chowtapalem
- Location in Andhra Pradesh, India Petlur Chowtapalem (India)
- Coordinates: 15°44′12″N 79°42′11″E
- Country: India
- State: Andhra Pradesh
- District: Prakasam

Population
  - Total: 3,000

Languages
  - Official: Telugu
- Time zone: UTC+5:30 (IST)
- Postal code: 523247
- Nearest city: Ongloe
- Lok Sabha constituency: Ongole
- Vidhan Sabha constituency: Darsi

East Choutapalem is a village in Darsi mandal, Prakasam District of Andhra Pradesh state, India.
