= Buddapalli =

Coordinates: 15°40′36″N 79°17′52″E

- Village
- Interactive map of Buddapalli
- Location in Andhra Pradesh, India Buddapalli (India)
- Country: India
- State: Andhra Pradesh
- District: Prakasam

Languages
  - Official: Telugu
- Time zone: UTC+5:30 (IST)
- Vehicle registration: AP

Buddapalli is a small village near Markapur in the Prakasam district, Andhra Pradesh, India.
