= Kovur, Prakasam district =

Kovur
- village
- Interactive map of Kovur
- Location in Andhra Pradesh, India Kovur (India)
- Coordinates: 15°15′55″N 79°52′42″E
- Country: India
- State: Andhra Pradesh
- District: Prakasam
- Mandal: Kandukur
- Elevation: 632 m (2,073 ft)

Population (2001) area_magnitude= sq. km
  - Total: 2,100

Languages
  - Official: Telugu
- Time zone: UTC+5:30 (IST)
- PIN: 523105
- Telephone code: 08598
- Vehicle registration: AP-27

Kovur is a village in Kandukur mandal of Prakasam district, in the State of Andhra Pradesh, India. It is one of the large tobacco farming villages in the Kandukur region.

== Geography ==
Kovur is located at (15.216667, 79.91666). Its surrounding Villages are Muppalla, Prakasam District, SingaraguntaBotlaPalem, Patha SingaraguntaBotlaPalem, Pandalapadu, Jillelamoodi, NarisettyvariPalem and YerraguntaPalem.

== Demographics ==
As of the 2001 India census, Kovur had a population of 2,700. Males constitute 50.08% of the population and females 49.19%. The village has an average literacy rate of 41.5.The literacy rate of males in the village is 72% while that of females is 55%.
