= Kotha Palem =

Kotha Palem is a model village situated one kilometer from Tallur in Prakasam district, in the state of Andhra Pradesh, India.

This village is located at 15.7347846°N 79.8674837°E.

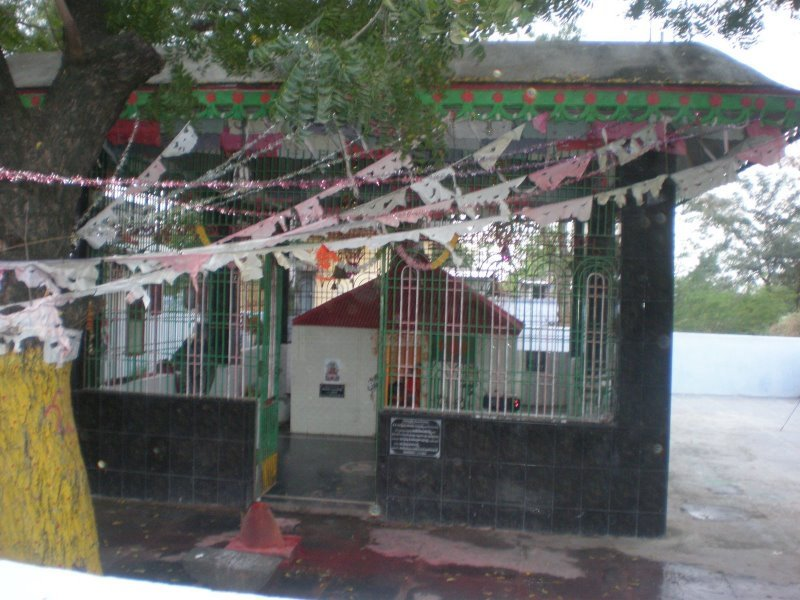
Temple constructed in 1900s
