= Mukthapuram =

- town
- Interactive map of Mukthapuram
- Location in Andhra Pradesh, India Mukthapuram (India)
- Coordinates: 15.2900°N 78.9667°E
- Country: India
- State: Andhra Pradesh
- District: Markapuram
- Elevation: 250 m (820 ft)

Languages
  - Official: Telugu
- Time zone: UTC+5:30 (IST)
- Telephone code: 08405

Mukthapuram is a village in Markapuram district, Komarolu Mandal, Andhra Pradesh, India.

== Geography ==
Mukthapuram is located at 15.2900°N 78.9667°E. It has an average elevation of 253 meters (833 feet).

Mukthapuram is a small village located on the main road from Giddaluru to Komarolu.

== Demographics ==
As of the 2001 India census, Mukthapuram has a population of 771. Males constitute 51% of the population and females 49%. Mukthapuram has an average literacy rate of 50%.

== Education ==
Mukthapuram is served by the following elementary school also has an Anganwadi centre :

- Elementary School
