= Voletivaripalem =

- Village
- Interactive map of Voletivaripalem
- Location in Andhra Pradesh, India
- Coordinates: 15°10′01″N 79°43′44″E
- Country: India
- State: Andhra Pradesh
- District: Prakasam
- Mandal: Voletivaripalem

Area
  - Total: 19.75 km^{2} (7.63 sq mi)

Population (2011)
  - Total: 3,622
  - Density: 183.4/km^{2} (475.0/sq mi)

Languages
  - Official: Telugu
- Time zone: UTC+5:30 (IST)
- Postal code: 523116
- Vehicle registration: AP–27

Voletivaripalem is a village in Prakasam district of the Indian state of Andhra Pradesh. It is the mandal headquarters of Voletivaripalem mandal in Kandukur revenue division.

== Demographics ==
Total population of Voletivaripalem is 3,622. Males are 1,805 and females are 1,817.

=== Kakarlapalem ===
Kakarlapalem is a village locality in Voletivaripalem mandal, Prakasam district, Andhra Pradesh.

The village is situated approximately 1 km from National Highway 167B (NH 167B), on the Singarayakonda–Malakonda route.

== Politics ==
Voletivaripalem falls under Kandukur assembly constituency and Nellore lok sabha constituency.
