= Juvvigunta =

- village
- Interactive map of Juvvigunta
- Location in Andhra Pradesh, India
- Coordinates: 15.371100°N 79.94333°E
- Country: India
- State: Andhra Pradesh
- District: Prakasam
- Talukas: Kondapi

Population
  - Total: 1,500

Languages
  - Official: Telugu
- Time zone: UTC+5:30 (IST)
- PIN: 523270

Juvvigunta is a village in Marripudi mandal in Prakasam district of Andhra Pradesh in India.
