= Chilakapadu =

- Village
- Interactive map of Chilakapadu
- Location in Andhra Pradesh, India Chilakapadu (India)
- Coordinates: 15.476160°N 79.904224°E
- Country: India
- State: Andhra Pradesh
- District: Prakasam

Population (2011)
  - Total: 2,500

Languages
  - Official: Telugu
- Time zone: UTC+5:30 (IST)
- PIN: 523225
- Vehicle registration: AP27
- Website: www.chilakapadu.com

Chilakapadu is a village near Santhanuthala padu mandal (distance 9 km), located in Prakasam district of the Indian state of Andhra Pradesh.
