= Chalappalem =

- Village
- Interactive map of Chalappalem
- Location in Andhra Pradesh, India Chalappalem (India)
- Coordinates: 15.60833°N 79.96393°E
- Country: India
- State: Andhra Pradesh
- District: Prakasam district
- Elevation: 12 m (39 ft)

Population
  - Total: 1,000

Languages
  - Official: Telugu
- Time zone: UTC+5:30 (IST)
- PIN: 523225
- Telephone code: 08592
- Vehicle registration: AP 27

Chalappalem is a village in Santhanuthalapadu mandal, Prakasam district, Andhra Pradesh, India.
