= Basireddy Palem =

- Village
- Interactive map of Basireddy Palem
- Location in Andhra Pradesh, India
- Coordinates: 15°04′46.94″N 79°52′22.80″E
- Country: India
- State: Andhra Pradesh
- District: Prakasam

Area
  - Total: 8.33 km^{2} (3.22 sq mi)

Population (2011)
  - Total: 2,686
  - Density: 322/km^{2} (835/sq mi)

Languages
  - Official: Telugu
- Time zone: UTC+5:30 (IST)
- PIN: 523281
- Vehicle registration: AP27
- Nearest town: Kandukuru
- Lok Sabha constituency: Nellore
- Vidhan Sabha constituency: Kandukuru

Basireddy Palem is a village in Prakasam district of the Indian state of Andhra Pradesh. It is located in Gudluru mandal.

== Politics ==
List of Elected Members:

- 1957–1962 – Divi Kondaiah Chowdary
- 1962–1967 – Nalamothu Chenchurama Naidu
- 1967–1972 – Nalamothu Chenchurama Naidu
- 1972—1978 – Manugunta Adinarayana Reddy
- 1978 – 1983 – Divi Kondaiah Chowdary
- 1983 and 1985 – Sri Manugunta Adinarayana Reddy
- 1989 and 1994 – Manugunta Maheedhar Reddy
- 1994 and 1999 – Dr. Divi Sivaram
- 1999 and 2004 – Dr. Divi Siva
- 2004 and 2009 – Manugunta Maheedhar Reddy
- 2009 and 2014 – Manugunta Maheedhar Reddy (Municipal Minister-2011)
- 2014-19 -Pothula Ramarao (YSRCP)
