= Zarugumilli =

Zarugumalli jarugumalli
- Village
- Interactive map of Zarugumalli
- Location in Andhra Pradesh, India Zarugumalli (India)
- Coordinates: 15.3°N 80°E
- Country: India
- State: Andhra Pradesh
- District: Prakasam
- Talukas: Zarugumalli

Languages
  - Official: Telugu
- Time zone: UTC+5:30 (IST)
- PIN: 523274
- Telephone code: +91–8592
- Vehicle registration: AP

Zarugumalli is a village in Prakasam district of the Indian state of Andhra Pradesh. It is the mandal headquarters of Zarugumilli mandal in Kandukur revenue division.
