= Ponnaluru =

- Village
- Interactive map of Ponnaluru
- Location in Andhra Pradesh, India Ponnaluru (India)
- Coordinates: 15.2833°N 79.8°E
- Country: India
- State: Andhra Pradesh
- District: Prakasam
- Mandal: Ponnaluru
- Elevation: 42 m (138 ft)

Languages
  - Official: Telugu
- Time zone: UTC+5:30 (IST)
- Vehicle registration: AP

Ponnaluru is a village in Prakasam district of the Indian state of Andhra Pradesh. It is located in Ponnaluru mandal in Kandukur revenue division.

== Geography ==
Ponnaluru is located at 15.2833°N 79.8000°E. It has an average elevation of 42.
