= Malakonda =

Village in Valetivari Palem, India

Malakonda is a village in Voletivaripalem mandal, Prakasam district, Andhra Pradesh, India.
