= Attintivaripalem =

- hamlet
- Interactive map of Attintivaripalem
- Location in Andhra Pradesh, India Attintivaripalem (India)
- Coordinates: 15.184224°N 79.838877°E
- Country: India
- State: Andhra Pradesh
- District: Prakasam
- Mandal: Voltetivaripalem
- Elevation: 632 m (2,073 ft)

Population (2001)
  - Total: 1,584

Languages
  - Official: Telugu
- Time zone: UTC+5:30 (IST)
- PIN: 523113
- Telephone code: 08599
- Sex ratio: 55:45 ♂/♀

Attintivaripalem is a small hamlet of Nekunam Puram K. Khandrika revenue village. It is a part of Voletivaripalem mandal in Prakasam district in the Indian state of Andhra Pradesh.

== Demographics ==
Attintivaripalem (Nekunampuram) had a population of approximately 1,584. Males constitute 55% of the population and females 45%. Attintivaripalem has an average literacy rate of 70%, higher than the national average of 59.5%: male literacy is 72%, and female literacy is 55%.
