= Elurivari palem =

- Village
- Interactive map of Elurivari palem
- Location in Andhra Pradesh, India
- Coordinates: 15.5479993°N 79.8849825°E
- Country: India
- State: Andhra Pradesh
- District: prakasham

Languages
  - Official: Telugu
- Time zone: UTC+5:30 (IST)
- PIN: 523226
- Nearest city: chimakurthy
- Lok Sabha constituency: bapatla
- Vidhan Sabha constituency: santhanuthalapadu

Elurivari Palem is a village located in Prakasam district, Andhra Pradesh state, India.
