= Kothapatnam =

- Village
- Interactive map of Kothapatnam
- Location in Andhra Pradesh, India Kothapatnam (India)
- Coordinates: 15.4667°N 80.1167°E
- Country: India
- State: Andhra Pradesh
- District: Prakasam
- Mandal: Kothapatnam

Languages
  - Official: Telugu
- Time zone: UTC+5:30 (IST)
- Postal code: 523286
- Vehicle registration: AP

Kothapatnam is a small coastal village in Prakasam district of the Indian state of Andhra Pradesh. It is located in Kothapatnam mandal in Ongole revenue division.

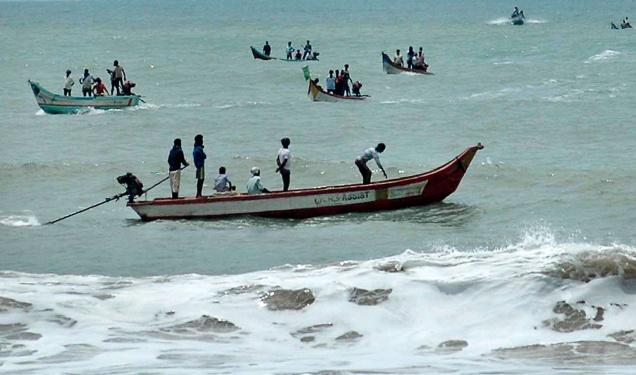
Boats at Kothapatnam beach

Kothapatnam Beach is one amongst the top attractions in Ongole. Located 18 kilometres (11 mi) from the city, the beach is a great source of entertainment for local people and tourists.

Motumala ( 6 kilometres (3.7 mi) ), Gadepalem ( 9 kilometres (5.6 mi) ), Pathapadu ( 9 kilometres (5.6 mi) ), Alluru ( 9 kilometres (5.6 mi) ), Ethamukkala ( 11 kilometres (6.8 mi) ) are the nearby Villages to Kothapatnam. Kothapatnam is surrounded by Ongole Mandal towards west, Tangutur Mandal towards west, Naguluppala Padu Mandal towards North, Singarayakonda Mandal towards South.

Rail - There is no railway station near to Kothapatnam in less than 10 kilometres (6.2 mi). Ongole Rail Way Station (near to Ongole), Karavadi Rail Way Station (near to Ongole) are the Rail way stations reachable from near by towns. However Guntur Jn Rail Way Station is amajor railway station 112 kilometres (70 mi) from Kothapatnam.

Road - Ongole are the nearby by towns to Kothapatnam having road connectivity to Kothapatnam. Bus - Ongole APSRTC Bus Station, Ongole Bypass APSRTC Bus Station, Tanguturu APSRTC Bus Station are the nearby by Bus Stations to Kothapatnam. APSRTC runs Number of busses from major cities to here.

Sriram Family Charitable Trust:

Public Toilets - A pay-and-use toilet was constructed resembling a bus at the Kothapatnam bus stand near here attracting the attention of the passengers. Parthsararaty Sriram, a young boy from the Kothapatnam village migrated to Chennai to eke out his livelihood and made a fortune as businessman there. He floated Sriram charitable trust named after his family to run social service activities in his native village. The trust realized the need for a public toilet near the bus stand at Kothapatnam and got the toilet designed in the shape of a bus. After completing the construction, it handed over the toilet to the panchayat (Village Council) for maintenance. The panchayat is allowing passengers to use the facility after paying nominal charges to maintain the toilet neat and clean.

Public Community Hall - Kothapatnam can now boast of a spacious "kalyanamandapam" (community hall) with all facilities, thanks to Sriram Family Trust, Chennai. The community hall was constructed at a cost of Rs. 16 lakhs and was inaugurated on Wednesday, 12 October 2005. S. Parthsarathy and his brother S. Nandagopal wanted the kalyanamandapam to be available to all castes and communities free of cost for social, cultural and religious purposes. The brothers wanted to perpetuate the memory of their father, Sriram Venkatarangam Chetty who was born in Kothapatnam and migrated to Chennai in 1900 where he engaged himself in business. Although he only brought his family to Kothapatnam for two years during the evacuation period in 1940s, the link between the family and the village is still active through various charitable activities.
