= Palugunti palli =

Palugunti Palli
- Village
- Interactive map of Palugunti Palli
- Location in Andhra Pradesh, India
- Coordinates: 15°28′49″N 78°57′47″E
- Country: India
- State: Andhra Pradesh
- District: Markapuram district

Languages
  - Official: Telugu
- Time zone: UTC+5:30 (IST)

Palugunti palli is a village in Racherla mandal, in the Markapuram district in the state of Andhra Pradesh in India.
