= Mynampadu =

Mynampadu is a major panchayat in Santhanuthala padu mandal in Prakasam district in the state of Andhra Pradesh in India.

== Demographics ==
This village holds a population of 6000 most of them of farmers and daily labor.
