= Rudravaram, Prakasam district =

Rudravaram
- Village
- Z.P.H School
- Interactive map of Rudravaram
- Location in Andhra Pradesh, India Rudravaram (India)
- Coordinates: 15.60833°N 79.96393°E
- Country: India
- State: Andhra Pradesh
- District: Prakasam district

Population
  - Total: 3,000

Languages
  - Official: Telugu
- Time zone: UTC+5:30 (IST)
- PIN: 523225
- Telephone code: 08592
- Vehicle registration: AP-27

Rudravaram is a village in Santhanuthalapadu mandal, Prakasam district, Andhra Pradesh, India.
