= Venkatapuram, Prakasam district =

Venkatapuram
- Village
- Interactive map of Venkatapuram
- Location in Andhra Pradesh, India Venkatapuram (India)
- Coordinates: 15.4724°N 80.0148°E
- Country: India
- State: Andhra Pradesh
- District: Prakasam
- Elevation: 69 m (226 ft)

Languages
  - Official: Telugu
- Time zone: UTC+5:30 (IST)
- Vehicle registration: AP
- Vidhan Sabha constituency: Addanki
- Climate: hot (Köppen)

Venkatapuram is a village in the Addanki Mandal of the Prakasam district in the Indian state of Andhra Pradesh.

== Geography ==
Venkatapuram has an average elevation of 24 meters (82 ft). It is located between the three major towns of Guntur (80 km (50 mi)), Ongole (35 km (22 mi)) and Addanki (6 km (3.7 mi)).
