= Kondamuru =

- Village
- Interactive map of Kondamuru
- Location in Andhra Pradesh, India Kondamuru (India)
- Coordinates: 15.831076°N 80.065012°E
- Country: India
- State: Andhra Pradesh
- District: Prakasam
- Mandal: J. Panguluru
- Elevation: 10 m (33 ft)

Population (2011)
  - Total: 2,380

Languages
  - Official: Telugu
- Time zone: UTC+5:30 (IST)
- PIN: 523 xxx
- Telephone code: +91–8593
- Vehicle registration: AP

Kondamuru is a village in J. Panguluru mandal Prakasam district of Andhra Pradesh, India.
