= Padarthi =

- Village
- Interactive map of Padarthi
- Country: India
- State: Andhra Pradesh
- District: Prakasam

Languages
  - Official: Telugu
- Time zone: UTC+5:30 (IST)
- PIN: 523286
- Vehicle registration: AP

Padarthi is a village in Prakasam District of Andhra Pradesh, India. According to the 2011 census it has a population of 4226 living in 8439 households.
