= P.Naidu Palem =

P. Naidu Palem
- village
- Interactive map of P. Naidu Palem
- Coordinates: 15°36′49″N 79°52′57″E
- Country: India
- State: Andhra Pradesh
- District: Prakasam

Government
  - Body: Panchayti

Population
  - Total: 1,500

Languages
  - Official: Telugu
- Time zone: UTC+5:30 (IST)
- PIN: 523226
- Vehicle registration: AP

P. Naidu Palem is a village in Chimakurthi mandal, located in Prakasam district of Andhra Pradesh, India.
