= Vaggampalli =

- Village
- Interactive map of Vaggampalli
- Country: India
- State: Andhra Pradesh
- District: Prakasam

Languages
  - Official: Telugu
- Time zone: UTC+5:30 (IST)

Vaggampalli is a village in Pamur mandal, located in Prakasam district of the Indian state of Andhra Pradesh.
