= Reddicherla =

Coordinates: 15°14′N 78°59′E

- village
- Interactive map of Reddicherla
- Country: India
- State: Andhra Pradesh
- District: Prakasam

Languages
  - Official: Telugu
- Time zone: UTC+5:30 (IST)
- Vehicle registration: AP

Reddycherla is a village in Prakasam district of Andhra Pradesh, India.
