= Muppalla, Prakasam District =

Muppalla Village
- village
- Nicknames: MPL, YSRMPL
- Interactive map of Muppalla Village
- Location in Andhra Pradesh, India Muppalla Village (India)
- Coordinates: 15°17′49.637″N 79°51′7.457″E
- Country: India
- State: Andhra Pradesh
- District: Prakasam

Government
  - Type: Parliamentary republic
- Elevation: 26 m (85 ft)

Population area_magnitude = 636 sq. km
  - Total: 1,705

Languages
  - Official: Telugu
- Time zone: UTC+5:30 (IST)
- PIN: 523109
- Telephone code: 08598
- Vehicle registration: AP-27
- Website: http://muppalla.page.tl/

Muppalla is a village in Ponnaluru mandal, Prakasam district in Indian state of Andhra Pradesh.

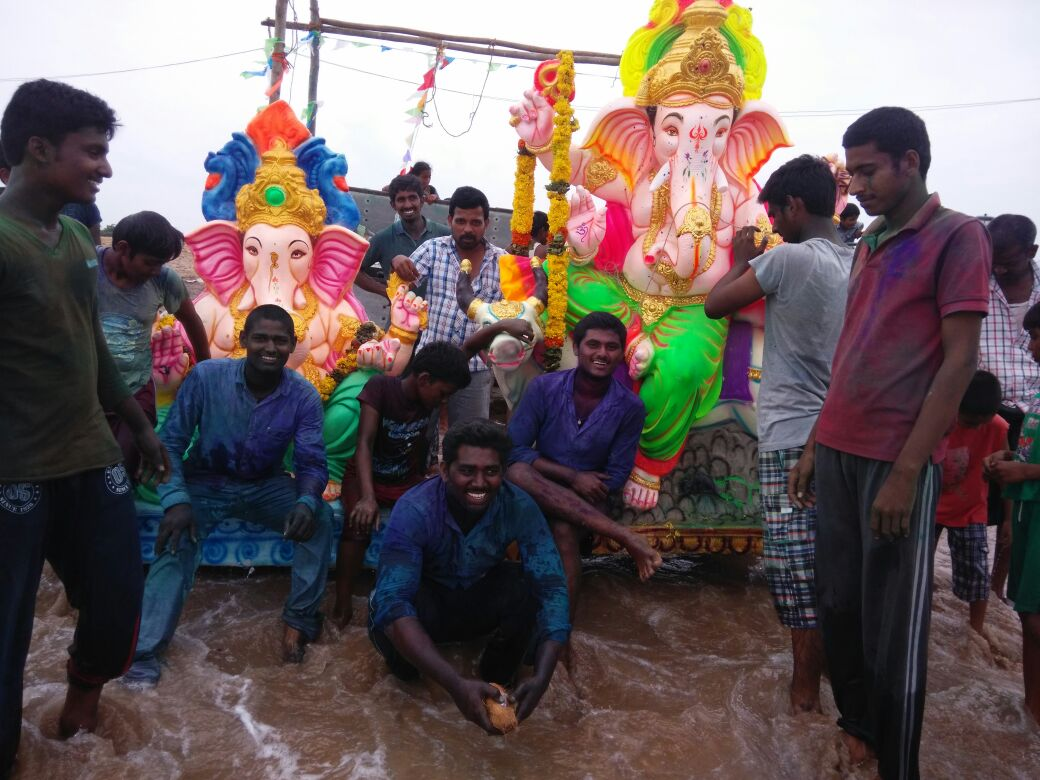
Mpl ganesh_nimarjanam

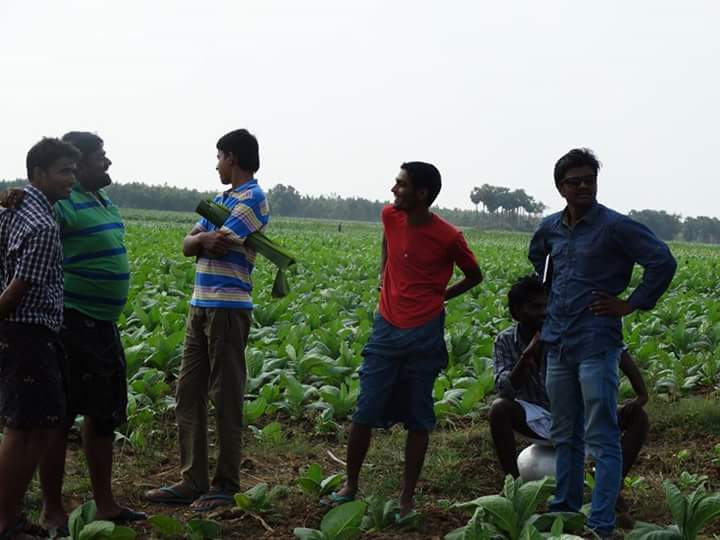
Mpl people

== Demographics ==
As per a 2011 India census, the total population of Muppalla is 1705 .Muppalla caste overview is 40% OC (Reddy), 30% BC and OBC and remaining 30% is SC & ST, In that Males are 841 and Females are 861 living in 433 Houses. Total area of Muppalla is 696 hectares. Muppalla Village having 62.03% Literacy, In that Male 73.85% and Female 50.69%.

== Education ==
The primary and secondary schools education is imparted by government such as Z.P.H.S Muppalla and M.P.P School, under the School Education Department of the state. The medium of instruction followed by different schools are English, Telugu. There are two engineering colleges in Kandukur which is nearer to Muppalla village.

== Assembly constituency ==
Muppalla is under Kondapi assembly constituency in Praksam District, Andhra Pradesh. There were 1,600 registered voters in Muppalla village for the 2014 elections. Muppalla is part of "Ongole" parliament constituency.

== Culture ==
Muppalla Village shows south Indian culture in a Pure form of Andhra traditional styles and also Grama Devathalu[village goddesses] festivals for Gangamma Thalli and Durga devi etc. based on Hindu religion.

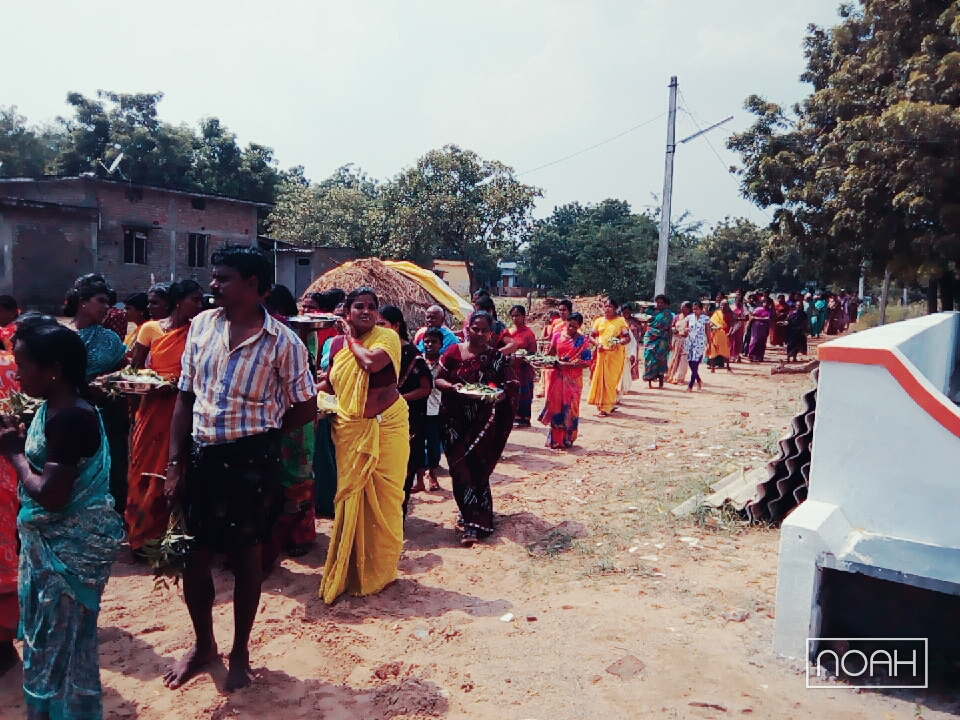
Noah EveryDay grama
