= T. Naidu Palem =

- Village
- Interactive map of T. Naidu Palem
- Location within Andhra Pradesh
- Coordinates: 15°23′21.24″N 80°02′17.24″E
- Country: India
- State: Andhra Pradesh
- District: Prakasam
- MandalMandal: Tanguturu

Population (2010)
  - Total: 2,000

Languages
  - Official: Telugu
- Time zone: UTC+5:30 (IST)
- PIN: 523272
- Telephone code: (+91)8592
- Parliament constituency: Ongole
- Assembly constituency: Kondepi
- Distance from Ongole: 12 kilometres (7.5 mi) S (land)

T. Naidu Palem (TNP) in its full form is known as Turpu Naidu Palem, turpu in Telugu meaning East. It is a small village located in Tanguturu mandal, Prakasam district in the state of Andhra Pradesh, India. T Naidu palem is located near the bay of Bengal coast.

== Geography ==
T. Naidu Palem is located at 15.3892333°N 080.0381222°E (15.3892333, 080.0381222).
