= Ayyaparaju Palem =

Coordinates: 15.59216°N 79.77573°E

Ayyaparaju Palem is a small village in Chimakurthy Mandal, Prakasam district, Andhra Pradesh state, India.
