= Devarapalem =

- city
- Interactive map of Devarapalem
- Location within Andhra Pradesh
- Coordinates: 15.633825°N 79.768725°E
- Country: India
- State: Andhra Pradesh
- District: Prakasam

Government
  - Type: democratic

Languages
  - Official: Telugu
- Time zone: UTC+5:30 (IST)

Devarapalem is a village located in Chimakurthi mandal of Prakasam district in the state of Andhra Pradesh, India. It is located 31 kilometres (19 mi) to the west of the District headquarters at Ongole.
