= Chinavenkannapalem =

- village
- Interactive map of Chinavenkannapalem
- Location in Andhra Pradesh, India
- Coordinates: 15.371336°N 79.9440°E
- Country: India
- State: Andhra Pradesh
- District: Prakasam
- Talukas: Kondapi

Population
  - Total: 783

Languages
  - Official: Telugu
- Time zone: UTC+5:30 (IST)
- PIN: 523279
- Telephone code: 08598

Chinavenkannapalem is a village in Kondapi in the Prakasam district, in the Indian state of Andhra Pradesh State. Chinavenkannapalem is a scenic village with an abundance of lush green fields along the Musi River, a tributary of the Krishna River.

== Demographics ==
As per the latest Census of India records, this village has 148 households with a total population of 702.
