= V. Kopperapadu =

V.Kopperapadu
- village
- Interactive map of V.Kopperapadu
- Location in Andhra Pradesh, India
- Coordinates: 15°56′10″N 79°57′25″E
- Country: India
- State: Andhra Pradesh
- District: Prakasam
- Mandal: Ballikurava

Languages
  - Official: Telugu
- Time zone: UTC+5:30 (IST)
- PIN: 523303
- Telephone code: 08404
- Vehicle registration: AP 27

V. Kopperapadu also known as Kopperapadu is a village in Ballikurava mandal of Prakasam district which is in Andhra Pradesh of India.

It is governed by village Panchayat.
