= Ramayapalem, Marripudi =

Ramayapalem
- village
- Interactive map of Ramayapalem
- Location in Andhra Pradesh, India Ramayapalem (India)
- Coordinates: 15°28′42.10″N 79°46′43.58″E
- Country: India
- State: Andhra Pradesh
- District: Prakasam
- Elevation: 43 m (141 ft)

Population (2010)
  - Total: 1,000

Languages
  - Official: Telugu
- Time zone: UTC+5:30 (IST)
- PIN: 523270
- Nearest city: Ongole
- Lok Sabha constituency: Ongole
- Vidhan Sabha constituency: Kondapi

Ramayapalem is a small village located in Marripudi Mandal, Prakasam district in the state of Andhra Pradesh, India.
