= Kunchepalli =

- village
- Interactive map of Kunchepalli
- Location in Andhra Pradesh, India Kunchepalli (India)
- Coordinates: 15.686660°N 79.639440°E
- Country: India
- State: Andhra Pradesh
- District: Markapuram
- Talukas: Podili

Population
  - Total: 2,108

Languages
  - Official: Telugu
- Time zone: UTC+5:30 (IST)
- PIN: 523240
- Telephone code: 08407

Kunchepalli is a village located at Podili mandal in Markapuram district in the state of Andhra Pradesh in India.
