= Singanna Palem =

Singanna Palem is a village of India, located in the Mundlamuru Mandal, Prakasam District of Andhra Pradesh. The number of houses in the village are 498, with a total population of 1861. Female population is approximately 48% and male population is 52%.

It is located 42 km towards west from District headquarters Ongole, 12 km from Mundlamur and 15 km from Darsi.
