= Naguluppalapadu =

- village
- Interactive map of Naguluppalapadu
- Country: India
- State: Andhra Pradesh
- District: Prakasam
- Talukas: Naguluppalapadu

Languages
  - Official: Telugu
- Time zone: UTC+5:30 (IST)
- PIN: 523183
- Telephone code: 08592
- Vehicle registration: AP27

Naguluppalapadu is a village in Prakasam district of the Indian state of Andhra Pradesh. It is the mandal headquarters of Naguluppalapadu mandal in Ongole revenue division.
