= Kondamanjulur =

Coordinates: 15.86975°N 80.08542°E

Kondamanjulur kondamanjuluru
- village
- Interactive map of Kondamanjulur
- Country: India
- State: Andhra Pradesh
- District: Prakasam

Population
  - Total: nearly 5,000

Languages
  - Official: Telugu
- Time zone: UTC+5:30 (IST)
- PIN: 523 261
- Vehicle registration: AP
- Nearest city: Chilakaluripeta, Addanki, Ongole
- Lok Sabha constituency: Bapatla
- Vidhan Sabha constituency: Addanki

Kondamanjulur is a village in Janakavaram Pangulur Mandal, Prakasam district, Andhra Pradesh.
