= Manduvavaripalem =

Manduvavaripalem Patimidapalem
- village
- Nickname: Patimida
- Interactive map of Manduvavaripalem
- Location in Andhra Pradesh, India Manduvavaripalem (India)
- Coordinates: 15.546108°N 80.044992°E
- Country: India
- State: Andhra Pradesh
- District: Prakasam

Languages
  - Official: Telugu
- Time zone: UTC+5:30 (IST)
- Vehicle registration: AP

Manduvavaripalem is a small village in Ongole mandal, Prakasam district in the state of Andhra Pradesh, India. It is 3 km (1.9 mi) from Ongole towards Guntur on NH 16. The village has become in the limelight as Andhra Pradesh's main opposition Telugu Desam Party (TDP) held its 'Mahandu- 2022' or annual conclave in this village Manduvavaripalem near Ongole on 27 & 28 May 2022.
