= Podili =

Podili Prudulapuri
- Town
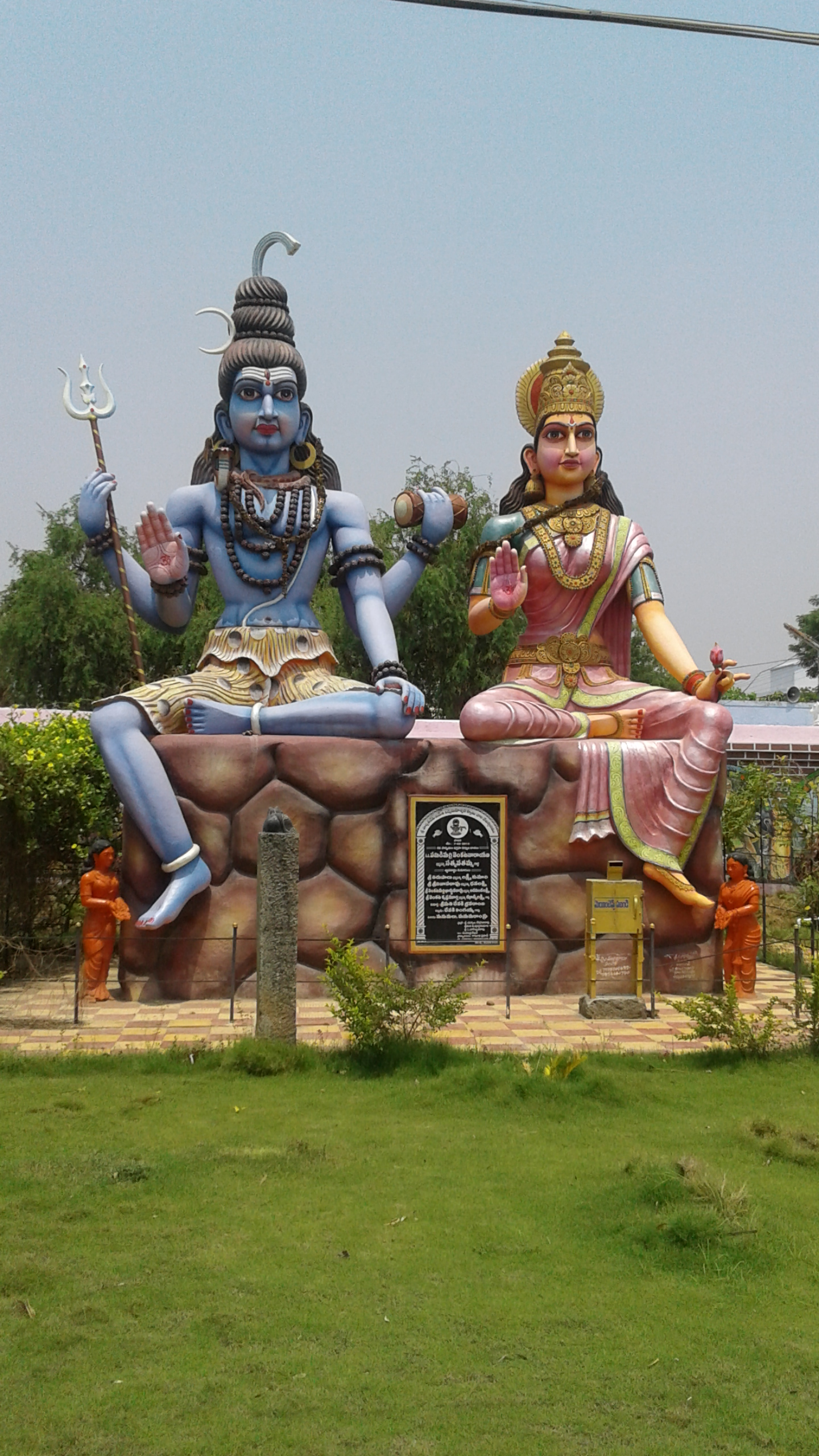
- Lord Shiva Parvathi Statue at Sivalayam, Podili
- Nickname: Prudulapuri
- Location in Andhra Pradesh, India
- Coordinates: 15.604°N 79.608°E
- Country: India
- State: Andhra Pradesh
- District: Markapuram
- Mandal: Podili

Government
  - Type: Municipal council
  - Body: Podili Nagar Panchayat

Area
  - Total: 43.88 km^{2} (16.94 sq mi)
- Elevation: 154 m (505 ft)

Population (2011)
  - Total: 52,100
  - Density: 1,190/km^{2} (3,080/sq mi)

Languages
  - Official: Telugu, Urdu
- Time zone: UTC+5:30 (IST)
- PIN: 523240
- Telephone code: +91–8499
- Vehicle registration: AP–39
- Sex ratio: 1000:986 ♂/♀
- Literacy: 64%
- Website: podili.cdma.ap.gov.in/ulbprofile/podili/home

Podili is a Municipality Town in Markapuram district of the Indian state of Andhra Pradesh. It is the mandal headquarters of Podili mandal. Podili is also known as Prudulapuri. Before British rule its name was "Prudulapuri" meaning "Head quarters of the universe". There is purana reference to this related to Prudhu Chakravarthi.

== Etymology ==
Podili is also known as Prudhilapuri. Before British rule its name was "Prudhilapuri" meaning "Head quarters of the universe". There is purana reference to this related to Prudhu Chakravarthi. Podili Hill is very famous with name of Podili Konda.

== Transport ==
Podili is connected by road to all cities in Andhra Pradesh by Andhra Pradesh State Road Transport Corporation, Operated by its own depot. Railway line. Nadikudi-srikalahasthi is passing (under construction) through the town.

== Regional Connectivity ==
Road

Podili is a town in Podili Mandal in Markapuram District of Andhra Pradesh State, India. It is located on Kurnool-Ongole Highway. Podili has its own APSRTC bus depot. its connect the town with all major towns and cities.

NH-565 passes through the Outskirt of Podili Municipality which connects Podili to Hyderabad on the Northern side and Nellore on the Southern side and further connects to Chennai via NH 16.

Bengaluru-Vijayawada new access-controlled expressway classified as NH-544G. It passes through the Podili mandal, and also there is one interchange point at Talamalla village in Podili mandal.

Other than that the Podili-Vinukonda, Podili-Tangutur, Podili-Markapur which is a State Highways, connects Podili to all major towns in state. Podili-Tangutur Road connects to NH 16 towards Chennai.

Rail

Podili has its own railway station on newly constructed line from Nadikudi to srikalahasti which passes through the Podili Town. Other nearby railway stations are ongole-50km, Markapur-40km, Donakonda-33km

Air

Vijayawada is the nearest Airport to Podili is at a distance of 172 km. Other International nearby Airports are Hyderabad, Tirupati and Chennai. All these Airports have good connectivity with major Indian cities like Delhi, Mumbai, Kolkata, Banglore and other International Cities. There is a proposal for a Green Field Domestic Airport at Ongole.

== History ==
The Kakatiyas were yet another dynasty to hold sway over the area comprised in Prakasam district. The first ruler who had anything to do with this district was Rudra (1150-1195 A.D.) The next phase in the conquest of this district appears to be in the time of Ganapathi Deva. He was the son of Mahadeva. So far as this district is concerned, Ganapathi Deva subdued the Velanadu Cholas, Telugu Cholas of Konidena and Chakranarayana princes.

With the first, he acquired mastery over Podili and Darsi and seems to have entrusted it to the Kayastha chief Gangaya Sahini who was ruling from Panugal to Marajawadi. These series of conquests brought Podili, Darsi, Addanki, Markapur and Giddaluru taluks of this district under the sway of the Kakatiyas.

The Saluvas ruled over the Podili area in the 15th century A.D., with their capital at Podili. A few inscriptions and the kaifiyat of Podili form the sources of their history. The Saluvas were known as Sombuvarayas and are confused with the Saluvas of Guntur, who acquitted and distinguished themselves better than the Saluvas of Podili and became celebrated in Srinatha's works. The rule of the Saluvas of Podili ended with Telugu Rayudu. Afterwards nothing is heard of his successors or sons.

== Geography ==
Podili is located on kurnool-ongole Road. It is 15.604°N 79.608°E in the Markapuram district of Andhra Pradesh. It has an area of 43.88 square kilometres (16.94 sq mi).

Podili-Kanigiri Plain is located in the South central part of the district expanding over complete Podili and parts of Markapur, Tarlupadu, Kanigiri and Pamur areas. It is drained by Musi and Paleru rivers with their tributaries, which are the sources of minor irrigation. The geology shows Archaean and lower Pre-Cambrian rock formations while the soils are Ustalfs-Tropepts.

== Climate ==
Podili has a tropical climate, specifically a tropical wet and dry climate (Aw) under the Köppen climate classification, Podili is located near the coast of the Bay of Bengal. The Podili town is surrounded by the range of Eastern Ghats. It has an average elevation of 154 metres (505 feet), and enjoys a hot climate for most of the year. Summer is very hot.

== Demographics ==
According to Census 2011, Podili's urban population is 31,145. Out of this, 15,681 are males while the females count 15464 here. This town has 3349 kids in the age group of 0–6 years. Among them 1753 are boys and 1596 are girls. According to 2011 census, the total number of households present in Podili Mandal is 16230.Podili municipality merged three Grama Panchayaths (Kambhalapadu, Madalavaripalem, Nandipalem) in 2020. In 2021 population is around 52100

== Administration ==
Podili is declared as Municipality in 2020. And it is merged with three Grama Panchayaths (Kambhalapadu, Madalavari Palem, Nandi Palem). All nearby villages merged in Podili Municipality. Podili Nagara Panchayat was selected for the ‘Swachh Shahar Samvaad’ award presented by the Union Ministry of Housing and Urban Affairs. Podili Nagara Panchayat Commissioner received the award from the Minister of State for the Housing and Urban Development at a function held in New Delhi on September 30, 2022. The municipality is continuously conducting the sanitation awareness programmes including rallies and demonstrations and special drives in the municipality limits.

== Civic Services ==
Drinking Water

Residents depended on monsoon rains for drinking water. Currently, water from the reservoir Nagarjuna Sagar Dam reaches the town via pumplines through a plant near Doruvu.

The first cases of endemic skeletal fluorosis (and its neurological signs) in the world were recorded in the Podili, Darsi and Kanigiri areas of Andhra Pradesh in 1937.

== Education ==
The primary and secondary school education is imparted by government, aided and private schools, under the School Education Department of the state. The medium of instruction followed by different schools are English, Telugu.

Podili came into the limelight in 2013 when a student from Podili bagged first rank in EAMCET and JEE Advanced.

Similar thing happened on 14 April 2017 when a girl from Podili named Shaik Sharmila topped the Intermediate Board examinations conducted by the Andhra Pradesh Board of Intermediate Education.

== Literature ==
"Narthanasala," a renowned mythological play, was authored by Sri Chilamakuri Venakata Krishna Murthy, a prominent playwright resided in Podili. The play garnered accolades at the Nandi Natakothsavam held in 2008, further cementing its cultural significance.

== Landmarks ==
There is a hill in Podili in the South side of the town which is under the ownership of the forest department. There is a temple at the top of the hill and there is a Koneru in that temple. Sivalayam is one of the old and famous temples in Podili Municipality.

== Assembly constituency ==
It is a part of Markapuram (Assembly constituency) along with Konakanamitla, Tarlupadu mandals. KANDULA NARAYANA REDDY is the present MLA of Markapuram Assembly constituency.

Once Podili is an Assembly Constituency.

== Lok sabha constituency ==
It is a part of Ongole Lok Sabha constituency. The current MP of is Maagunta Srinivasul Reddy.
