= Chimakurthy =

Chimakurthi
- Town
- Nickname: chimakurthi
- Interactive map of Chimakurthi
- Location in Seemandhra, India
- Coordinates: 15°35′08″N 79°52′04″E
- Country: India
- State: Andhra Pradesh
- District: Prakasam
- Mandal: Chimakurthi

Government
  - Body: Chimakurthi

Area
  - Total: 22.43 km^{2} (8.66 sq mi)

Languages
  - Official: Telugu
- Time zone: UTC+5:30 (IST)
- PIN: 523226
- Vehicle registration: AP 40

Chimakurthi is a town with civic status as Municipality in Prakasam district of the Indian state of Andhra Pradesh. It is also a mandal headquarters for Chimakurthi mandal in Ongole revenue division.
