= Metlavaripalem =

Village in India

Metlavaripalem is a small village in the Markapuram district of the Indian state of Andhra Pradesh. It is the village in Pedairlapadu panchayat in Pedacherlopalle mandal.
