= Talamalla =

- Village and Neighborhood
- Interactive map of Talamalla
- Location in Andhra Pradesh, India
- Coordinates: 15.594104°N 79.722437°E
- Country: India
- State: Andhra Pradesh
- District: Markapuram
- Mandal: Podili

Population (2022)
  - Total: 5,000

Languages
  - Official: Telugu
- Time zone: UTC+5:30 (IST)
- PIN: 523253
- Vehicle registration: AP-27z
- Nearest city: PODILI

Talamalla village is a neighborhood and suburb of Podili in Podili mandal, Markapuram district, Andhra Pradesh. It is on the banks of a rivulet called Musi. It is a Panchayat with a population of around 5,000 people. Talamalla is surrounded by Gogineni vari palem, Firdous nagar in Podili mandal.
