= Janakavaram Panguluru =

- Village
- Interactive map of Janakavaram Panguluru
- Location in Andhra Pradesh, India Janakavaram Panguluru (India)
- Coordinates: 15°49′09″N 80°05′30″E
- Country: India
- State: Andhra Pradesh
- District: Prakasam
- Mandal: J. Panguluru
- Talukas: Janakavaram Panguluru

Languages
  - Official: Telugu
- Time zone: UTC+5:30 (IST)
- PIN: 523214
- Telephone code: +91–8593
- Vehicle registration: AP27

Janakavaram Panguluru is a village in Prakasam district of the Indian state of Andhra Pradesh. It is the mandal headquarters of Janakavaram Panguluru mandal..
