= Gajjala Konda =

Gajjalakonda
- Village
- Interactive map of Gajjalakonda
- Location in Andhra Pradesh, India Gajjalakonda (India)
- Coordinates: 15.752°N 79.3921°E
- Country: India
- State: Andhra Pradesh
- District: Markapuram
- Mandal: Markapur

Government
  - Type: Democratic
  - Body: Gram Panchayat
- Elevation: 224 m (735 ft)

Population
  - Total: 4,567

Languages
  - Official: Telugu
- Time zone: UTC+5:30 (IST)
- PIN: 523315
- Telephone code: 08596
- Vehicle registration: AP

Gajjalakonda is a village in Markapur mandal, Markapuram district of Andhra Pradesh State, India.

== Grama Panchayat ==
Shri. has been elected as sarpanch for Gajjalakonda Grama Panchayat for 5 years. His tenure will end on 1 August 2018.

Elected members of Gajjalakonda Village to local body for the term of 5 Years i.e., from 2 August 2013, to 1 August 2018.

Serial No	Ward No	Elected Member
01	Ward 1	Gundavarapu Lakshmi Devi
02	Ward 2	Gajjalakonda Nageswara Rao
03	Ward 3	Jammulamudi Vengaiah
04	Ward 4	Jammulamudi Salmon
05	Ward 5	K Kumari
06	Ward 6	B. Venkata Ramanamma
07	Ward 7	P. Prabhavathi
08	Ward 8	Gadda Chennamma
09	Ward 9	T. Lakshmamma
10	Ward 10	Nadikattu Ramireddy
11	Ward 11	Adimulapu Lalithamma
12	Ward 12	Chilaka Saravothama Reddy
13	Ward 13	Batthula Nagaiah

== Demographics ==
There are total 1093 families residing. The Gajjalakonda village has population of 4567 of which 2388 are males while 2179 are females as per Population Census 2011.

In Gajjalakonda village population of children with age 0-6 is 502 which makes up 10.99% of total population of village. Average Sex Ratio of Gajjala Konda village is 912 which is lower than Andhra Pradesh state average of 993. Child Sex Ratio for the Gajjala Konda as per census is 880, lower than Andhra Pradesh average of 939.

Gajjalakonda village has lower literacy rate compared to Andhra Pradesh. In 2011, literacy rate of Gajjala Konda village was 56.14% compared to 67.02% of Andhra Pradesh. In Gajjala Konda Male literacy stands at 69.21% while female literacy rate was 41.87%.
