= Kolalapudi =

- village
- Interactive map of Kolalapudi
- Location in Andhra Pradesh, India
- Coordinates: 15°54′30″N 80°6′00″E
- Country: India
- State: Andhra Pradesh
- District: Bapatla

Population (2021)
  - Total: 6,500

Languages
  - Official: Telugu
- Time zone: UTC+5:30 (IST)
- PIN: 523261

Kolalapudi is a village in Martur mandal, Bapatla district in the Indian state of Andhra Pradesh. The village had a population of 6,500 at the 2021 census. Kolalapudi is located 3.0 km (1.9 mi) from National Highway No. 16. The nearest towns are Chilakaluripet, Addanki, Ongole and Guntur, which are 25 km (16 mi), 23 km (14 mi), 50 km (31 mi) and 60 km (37 mi) away from Kolalapudi respectively.

Kolalapudi benefited from the irrigation facilities provided by the Nagarjunasagar canals. The fertile irrigated land and the seasonal vegetables farming and milk production were the major sources of prosperity of the village. Kolalapudi is famous for its mangoes and people come from different parts of Andhra Pradesh and Telangana to purchase mangoes. The main crop grown in the village is paddy and many farmers migrate seasonally to various parts of South India to grow paddy and other commercial crops and they return to the home place after harvest and marketing. Eventually Kolalapudi diversified its wealth into business, granites, contracts and higher education. Kolalapudi counts among its natives some well-known farmers and educated people. Many villagers have migrated to other state provinces and also to the foreign countries.

The people in this village worships the goddess named "Gangamma thalli" as Gramadevatha and they do celebrations (Kolupulu) in favour of her every year in Sravana masam.

The geographical calculations say that this mighty hill is the first hill to come to view when seen from the Bay of Bengal.
