= Pajarla =

Village in Andhra Pradesh, India

Pajarla is a village in Gudluru mandal, Sri Potti Sriramulu Nellore district, Andhra Pradesh, India. It is located 5 kilometres (3.1 mi) away from NH-5. The village is famous for mangoes.
