= Pamidipadu =

- Village
- Nickname: Pinnaka
- Interactive map of Pamidipadu
- Location in Andhra Pradesh, India
- Coordinates: 15°42′42″N 80°06′40″E
- Country: India
- State: Andhra Pradesh
- District: Prakasam
- Mandal: Korisapadu

Population (2011)
  - Total: 10,000

Languages
  - Official: Telugu
- Time zone: UTC+5:30 (IST)
- PIN: 523213

Pamidipadu is a village in Korisapadu mandal of Prakasam district in Andhra Pradesh.
