= Gangampalli =

- Village
- Interactive map of Gangampalli
- Location in Andhra Pradesh, India
- Coordinates: 15.45332°N 78.98287°E
- Country: India
- State: Andhra Pradesh
- District: Markapuram
- Mandal: Racharla
- Time zone: UTC+5:30 (IST)
- Area code: +91

Gangampalli, also known as Gangampalle, is a small village near Giddaluru in the Markapuram District of Andhra Pradesh, India.
