= Manikeswaram =

Coordinates: 15°45′N 79°58′E

Manikeswaram Southern Kasi, Dakshina Kasi
- Holy Place
- Interactive map of Manikeswaram
- Country: India
- State: Andhra Pradesh
- District: Prakasam
- Time zone: UTC+5:30 (IST)
- PIN: 523212
- Telephone code: 08593
- Nearest city: Ongole, Guntur, Addanki

Manikeswaram is a village on the banks of the Gundlakamma river in the Prakasam district of the Indian state of Andhra Pradesh.
