= Marripudi, Prakasam district =

Marripudi
- Village
- Interactive map of Marripudi
- Location in Andhra Pradesh, India Marripudi (India)
- Coordinates: 15°30′48.11″N 79°39′10.64″E
- Country: India
- State: Andhra Pradesh
- District: Prakasam
- Mandal: Marripudi

Population (2011)
  - Total: 5,932
  - Rank: Pokuri Anjaneyulu

Languages
  - Official: Telugu
- Time zone: UTC+5:30 (IST)

Marripudi is a village in Prakasam district of the Indian state of Andhra Pradesh. It is the mandal headquarters of Marripudi mandal in Kandukur revenue division.

Gangapalem village Marripudi Mandal

Famous temple Sri abhaya anjaneya swami temple Gangapalem

Schools=1.M.P.P.School Gangapalem
