= B. Cherlopalli =

Coordinates: 14.357°N 79.763°E

B. Cherlopalli is a village in Markapuram district and Pedda Araveedu mandal, Andhra Pradesh, India. In B. Cherlopalli B stands for Badveedu which is a nearby village and it is the major panchayathi for five villages.
