= Irasalagundam =

- Village
- Interactive map of Irasalagundam
- Location in Andhra Pradesh, India Irasalagundam (India)
- Coordinates: 15°32′08″N 79°30′04″E
- Country: India
- State: Andhra Pradesh
- District: Markapuram
- Talukas: Konakanametla

Languages
  - Official: Telugu
- Time zone: UTC+5:30 (IST)
- PIN: 523245
- Telephone code: 08499

Irasalagundam is a village in Markapuram district of the Indian state of Andhra Pradesh. It is located in Konakanamittla mandal.
