= Kambaladinne =

- village
- Interactive map of Kambaladinne
- Location in Andhra Pradesh, India Kambaladinne (India)
- Coordinates: 15°02′42″N 79°32′32″E
- Country: India
- State: Andhra Pradesh
- District: Markapuram

Population
  - Total: 10,000

Languages
  - Official: Telugu
- Time zone: UTC+5:30 (IST)
- PIN: 523110
- Telephone code: 08490
- Nearest city: Ongole
- Lok Sabha constituency: Ongole
- Vidhan Sabha constituency: Kanigiri

Kambaladinne is a small village in Markapuram district in the state of Andhra Pradesh in India.
