= Chinthagumpalli =

Village in Chinaganjam, India

Chinthagumpalli is a village in Chinaganjam mandal, Bapatla district, Andhra Pradesh, India. The village has a population of 1443.
