= Nakkalapalem =

Coordinates: 15°52′N 80°10′E

Nakkalapalem is one of the villages in Inkollu mandal of Bapatla district, Andhra Pradesh, India.
