= Santhanuthalapadu =

Santhanuthalapadu S N Padu
- village
- Interactive map of Santhanuthalapadu
- Country: India
- State: Andhra Pradesh
- District: Prakasam
- Mandal: Santhanuthalapadu

Area
  - Total: 3 km^{2} (1.2 sq mi)

Languages
  - Official: Telugu
- Time zone: UTC+5:30 (IST)
- PIN: 523225
- Telephone code: 08592-
- Vehicle registration: AP

Santhanuthalapadu (or S N Padu) is a village in Prakasam district of the Indian state of Andhra Pradesh. It is located Santhanuthalapadu mandal in Ongole revenue division.

== See also ==
- Santhanuthalapadu Assembly constituency
