= Uppugundur =

- village
- Nickname: Chinna Madras
- Interactive map of Uppugundur
- Location in Andhra Pradesh, India
- Country: India
- State: Andhra Pradesh
- District: Prakasam

Government
  - Body: Gramapanchayat

Population (2016)
  - Total: 14,026

Languages
  - Official: Telugu
- Time zone: UTC+5:30 (IST)
- PIN: 523186
- Telephone code: 08592
- Vehicle registration: AP
- Website: manauppugunduru.com

Uppugundur is a village in the Prakasam district Naguluppalapadu mandal of Andhra Pradesh. Population as of 2011 census
