= Adusumalli =

- Village
- Interactive map of Adusumalli
- Location in Andhra Pradesh, India Adusumalli (India)
- Coordinates: 16°1′17″N 80°18′48″E
- Country: India
- State: Andhra Pradesh
- District: Bapatla

Languages
  - Official: Telugu
- Time zone: UTC+5:30 (IST)
- PIN: 523169

Adusumalli is a village located in the Parchur mandal of Bapatla district , in the state of Andhra Pradesh.
