= Vinodarayunipalem =

- village
- Interactive map of Vinodarayunipalem
- Country: India
- State: Andhra Pradesh

Languages
  - Official: Telugu
- Time zone: UTC+5:30 (IST)
- Postal code: 523180
- Vehicle registration: AP

Vinodarayunipalem is a village in the Prakasam District of Andhra Pradesh state in India. It is located 29 km (18 mi) away from Ongole, the district headquarters. The village is the birthplace of Tanguturi Prakasam, the first chief minister of the former Andhra State.

The village is very near to the Bay of Bengal through the Kanaparthi seashore point.
