= Rayavaram (Markapur mandal) =

- Village
- Interactive map of Rayavaram
- Location in Andhra Pradesh, India Rayavaram (India)
- Coordinates: 15°43′N 79°19′E
- Country: India
- State: Andhra Pradesh
- State: Markapuram
- Mandal: Markapur

Area
  - Total: 4.75 km^{2} (1.83 sq mi)

Population (2011)
  - Total: 2,633
  - Density: 554/km^{2} (1,440/sq mi)

Languages
  - Official: Telugu
- Time zone: UTC+5:30 (IST)
- Postal code: 521162
- Vehicle registration: AP

Rayavaram is a small village in Markapur mandal in the Markapuram district in the state of Andhra Pradesh, India.

== Demographics ==
Rayavaram village has a population of 2950 of which Males are 1490 and Females are 1460. Total Households in Rayavaram are 783.
