= Pothukatla =

- Village
- Interactive map of Pothukatla
- Location in Andhra Pradesh, India Pothukatla (India)
- Coordinates: 15.953291°N 80.355432°E
- Country: India
- State: Andhra Pradesh
- District: Bapatla

Languages
  - Official: Telugu
- Time zone: UTC+5:30 (IST)
- Postal code: 523 169
- Telephone code: 08594 std code

Pothukatla is a village in Parchur Mandal in Bapatla district in the state of Andhra Pradesh, India.

== Geography ==
Pothukatla is located at 15.953291°N 80.355432°E. It has an average elevation of 8 meters (32 feet) above sea-level. The annual rainfall due to the southwest monsoon. It has a tropical savanna climate (Köppen climate classification).
