= Ulavapadu =

- village
- Interactive map of Ulavapadu
- Location in Andhra Pradesh, India Ulavapadu (India)
- Coordinates: 15.1667°N 80.0°E
- Country: India
- State: Andhra Pradesh
- District: Prakasam
- Mandal: Ulavapadu
- Talukas: Ulavapadu

Languages
  - Official: Telugu
- Time zone: UTC+5:30 (IST)
- PIN: 523292
- Vehicle registration: AP

Ulavapadu is a village in Ulavapadu mandal in Prakasam district of the Indian state of Andhra Pradesh. It is famous for variety of mangoes such as Banginapalli, Rasalu and also famous for a variety of Sapotas. The fruits produced here are exported to various states and countries. It is the mandal headquarters of Ulavapadu mandal.

== Geography ==
Ulavapadu is located at 15.1667°N 80.0°E.
