= Valaparla =

Village in Andhra Pradesh, India

- village
- Interactive map of Valaparla
- Location in Andhra Pradesh, India Valaparla (India)
- Coordinates: 15°55′0″N 80°3′0″E
- Country: India
- State: Andhra Pradesh
- District: Bapatla
- Elevation: 69 m (226 ft)

Languages
  - Official: Telugu
- Time zone: UTC+5:30 (IST)
- PIN: 523260
- Telephone code: 08404

Valaparla is a village located west of National Highway 5 in Martur Mandal of Bapatla district in Andhra Pradesh, India. The village was previously called Olupara. The village code in the 2011 census was 590698; its pin code is 523260.

== Population ==
As per 2011 census the total population of Valaparla is 10,151 out of which 5,166 are males and 4,985 are females thus the Average Sex Ratio of Valaparla is 965

The population of Children of age 0–6 years in Valaparla village is 1033 which is 10% of the total population. There are 509 male children and 524 female children between the ages of 0 and 6 years. Thus as per the Census 2011 the Child Sex Ratio of Valaparla is 1,029 which is greater than Average Sex Ratio (965) of Valaparla village.

As per the Census 2011, the literacy rate of Valaparla is 68.1%. Thus Valaparla village has higher literacy rate compared to 56.1% of Prakasam district. The male literacy rate is 77.84% and the female literacy rate is 57.88% in Valaparla village.

== Education ==
There are nine primary schools in the village. The secondary school, Zilla Parishad High School (ZPHS, dating from 1951), is a coeducational day school providing education from year 6 to 10. There is an intermediate college named as M.S.R. (Magunta Subbaramareddy junior college).
