= Singarakonda =

- village
- Country: India
- State: Andhra Pradesh
- Region: Coastal Andhra
- District: Prakasam
- Time zone: UTC+5:30 (IST)
- PIN: 523201
- Telephone code: 08593
- Nearest city: Ongole, Guntur Narsaraopeta & Addanki
- Website: www.singarakonda.com

Singarakonda is a well-known pilgrimage centre located near [Addanki] in [Andhra Pradesh], associated mainly with Sri Lakshmi Narasimha Swamy and Sri Prasanna Anjaneya Swamy. The temple is situated amidst the hillocks of Singarakonda and is an important religious and cultural landmark of the [Addanki] region.
