= Cherlo Donakonda =

- village
- Interactive map of Cherlo Donakonda
- Location in Andhra Pradesh, India Cherlo Donakonda (India)
- Coordinates: 15.666087°N 78.998418°E
- Country: India
- State: Andhra Pradesh
- District: Markapuram
- Mandal: Ardhaveedu

Languages
  - Official: Telugu
- Time zone: UTC+5:30 (IST)
- PIN: 523335

Cherlo Donakonda is a village and panchayat in Ardhaveedu Mandal in Markapuram district in the state of Andhra Pradesh in India.

== Geography ==
Cherlo Donakonda is located at 15.666087°N 78.998418°E.
