= Peda Bommalapuram =

Pedda Bommalapuram Bramarambapuram
- Village
- Interactive map of Pedda Bommalapuram
- Location in Andhra Pradesh, India
- Coordinates: 15.9685°N 79.1040°E
- Country: India
- State: Andhra Pradesh
- District: Markapuram

Population (2011)
  - Total: 4,293

Languages
  - Official: Telugu
- Time zone: UTC+5:30 (IST)
- PIN: 523331

Pedda Bommalapuram is a village in Markapuram district of the India state of Andhra Pradesh. It is located in Dornala mandal.
