= Themidithapadu =

- village
- Location in Andhra Pradesh, India
- Coordinates: 15.889°N 80.256°E
- Country: India
- State: Andhra Pradesh
- District: Bapatla

Languages
  - Official: Telugu
- Time zone: UTC+5:30 (IST)
- PIN: 523170

Themidithapadu (also transliterated as Timidithapadu, Themididhapadu, Timiditha Padu, Thimidithapadu) is a village in the Bapatla district of the state of Andhra Pradesh, India. The village is located around 15 km from the city of Chirala.
