= Punugodu =

Coordinates: 15°25′N 79°35′E

Ponugodu is a small village near Chandur, in Kanagal Mandal, Nalgonda district, Telangana, India. It is 30 km (19 mi) from Nalgonda.
