= Ramayapalem, Peda Araveedu =

Village in Andhra Pradesh, India

Ramayapalem is a village in Peda Araveedu Mandal in Markapuram district of Andhra Pradesh state, India. It belongs to Andhra region.

Ramayapalem Pin code is 523331 and postal head office is Pedda Dornala.

Markapur, Srisailam Project (Right Flank Colony) Township, Vinukonda, Macherla are the nearby Cities to Ramayapalem.
