= Chandrasekharapuram =

- Village
- Interactive map of Chandrasekharapuram
- Location in Andhra Pradesh, India Chandrasekharapuram (India)
- Coordinates: 15.1833°N 79.2833°E
- Country: India
- State: Andhra Pradesh
- District: Markapuram
- Mandal: Chandrasekharapuram

Population (2011)
  - Total: 7,544

Languages
  - Official: Telugu
- Time zone: UTC+5:30 (IST)
- Vehicle registration: AP39

Chandrasekharapuram is a village in Markapuram district of the Indian state of Andhra Pradesh. It is the mandal headquarters of Chandrasekharapuram mandal in Kanigiri revenue division.

Pamulapati pulliah naidu gaaru is served as the munusubu for chandrasekhara puram ( cs puram) in 1980s before the abolition of patel-patwari system by ntr in 1983 he has two sons 1.pamulapati lakshmana rao

2.pamulapati venkata subba rao
