= Konakanamitla =

- village
- Interactive map of Konakanamitla
- Location in Andhra Pradesh, India
- Coordinates: 15.65°N 79.5°E
- Country: India
- State: Andhra Pradesh
- District: Markapuram
- Talukas: Konakanamitla

Languages
  - Official: Telugu
- Time zone: UTC+5:30 (IST)

Konakanamitla is a village in Markapuram district of the Indian state of Andhra Pradesh. It is the mandal headquarters of Konakanamitla mandal in Markapur revenue division.

== Geography ==
Konakanamitla is located at 15.65°N 79.5°E.
