= Pedacherlopalle =

- Village
- Interactive map of Pedacherlopalle
- Location in Andhra Pradesh, India Pedacherlopalle (India)
- Coordinates: 15°20′14″N 79°27′10″E
- Country: India
- State: Andhra Pradesh
- District: Markapuram
- Mandal: Pedacherlopalle

Languages
  - Official: Telugu
- Time zone: UTC+5:30 (IST)
- PIN: 523117
- Vehicle registration: AP

Pedacherlopalle is a village in Markapuram district of the Indian state of Andhra Pradesh. It is the mandal headquarters of Pedacherlopalle mandal in Kanigiri revenue division.
