= Naguluppalapadu mandal =

Mandal in Prakasam district

- Mandal
- Interactive map of Naguluppalapadu mandal
- Country: India
- State: Andhra Pradesh
- District: Prakasam

Languages
  - Official: Telugu
- Time zone: UTC+5:30 (IST)
- PIN: 531040
- Vehicle Registration: AP31, AP32, AP33 (Former); AP39 (from 30 January 2019)

Naguluppalapadu mandal' (NG Padu mandal) is a mandal in Prakasam district of Andhra Pradesh state. It includes Uppugunduru, Maddirala, Muppalla, Eadumudi villages,
