= Tarlupadu =

- Village
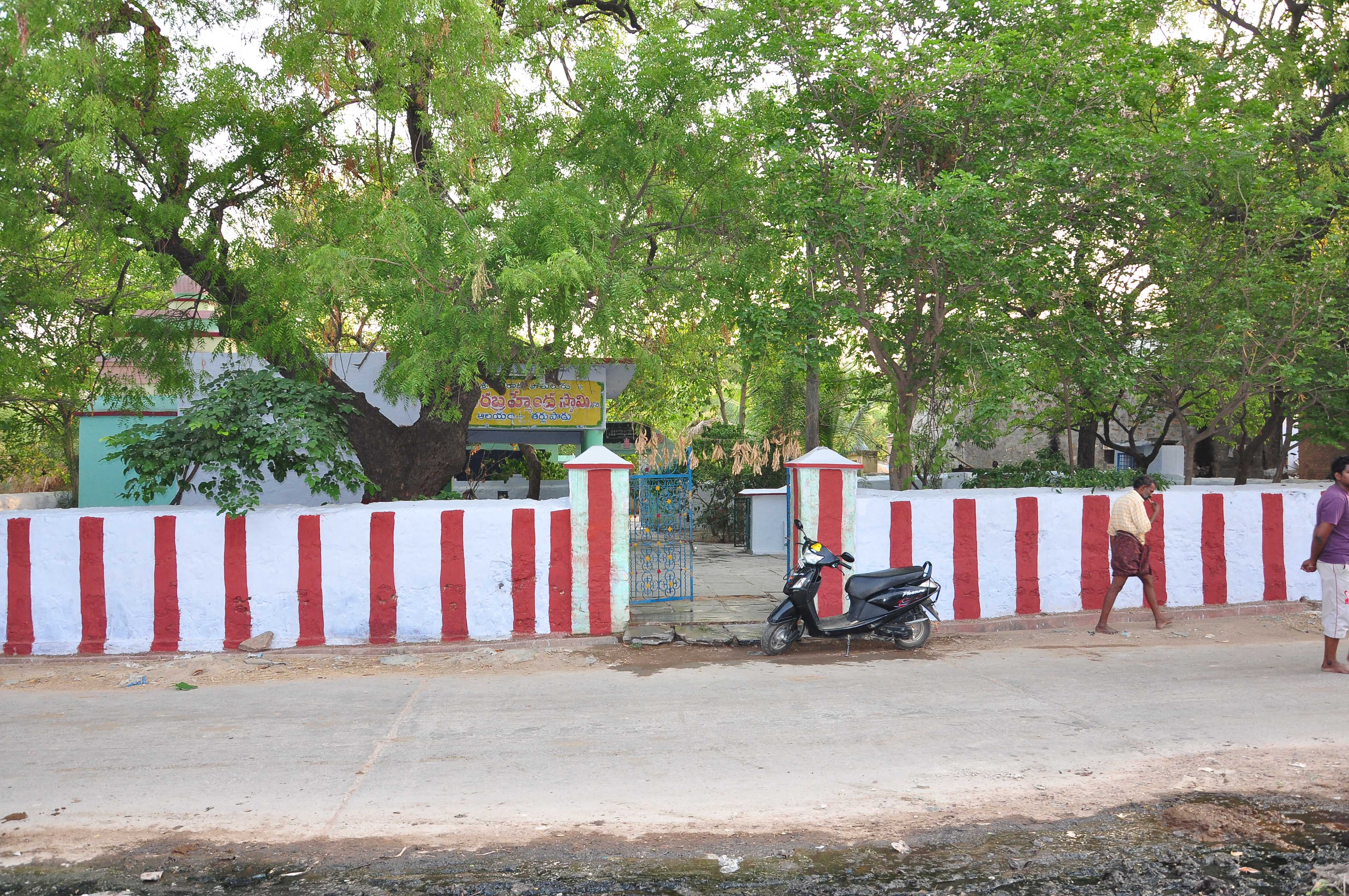
- Veerabrahmendra swamy temple, Tarlupadu
- Nickname: tlu
- Interactive map of Tarlupadu
- Location in Andhra Pradesh, India Tarlupadu (India)
- Coordinates: 15.657°N 79.224°E
- Country: India
- State: Andhra Pradesh
- District: Markapuram

Population
  - Total: 5,000

Languages
  - Official: Telugu
- Time zone: UTC+5:30 (IST)
- PIN: 523332
- Vehicle registration: AP

Tarlupadu is a village in Markapuram district of the Indian state of Andhra Pradesh. It is the mandal headquarters of Tarlupadu mandal in Markapur revenue division.
