= Kandukur mandal =

Kandukuru mandal
- Mandal
- Interactive map of Kandukuru mandal
- Location in Andhra Pradesh, India
- Coordinates: 15.2166650°N 79.9042°E
- Country: India
- State: Andhra Pradesh
- District: Prakasam
- Headquarters: Kandukuru

Area
  - Total: 221.19 km^{2} (85.40 sq mi)

Population (2011)
  - Total: 98,769
  - Density: 446.53/km^{2} (1,156.5/sq mi)

Languages
  - Official: Telugu
- Time zone: UTC+5:30 (IST)

Kandukuru mandal is a mandals in Prakasam district of the Indian state of Andhra Pradesh. Its headquarters are located at Kandukuru. This mandal is part of Kandukur revenue division.

== Demographics ==
As of 2011 census, the mandal had a population of 98,769. The total population constitute, 38,090 males and 37,699 females —a sex ratio of 989 females per 1000 males. 8,365 children are in the age group of 0–6 years, of which 4,276 are boys and 4,089 are girls —a ratio of 956 per 1000. The average literacy rate stands at 67.2% with 59,671 literates.

== Towns and villages ==
As of 2011 census, the mandal has 20 settlements. It includes 1 town and 19 villages. The settlements in the mandal are listed below:

1. Anandapuram
2. Anantha Sagaram
3. Donda Padu
4. G.Meka Padu
5. Jillelamudi
6. Kancharagunta
7. Kondamudusu Palem
8. Kondikandukur
9. Kovur
10. Machavaram
11. Madanagopalapuram
12. Mahadevapuram (R)
13. Mopadu
14. Muppalakesaram
15. Ogur
16. Palukur
17. Palur
18. Pandalapadu
19. Vikkiralapeta

Note: CT-Census town

== See also ==
- List of mandals in Andhra Pradesh
