= Racherla =

- Village
- Interactive map of Racherla
- Location in Andhra Pradesh, India Racherla (India)
- Coordinates: 15.4667°N 78.9667°E
- Country: India
- State: Andhra Pradesh
- District: Markapuram

Area
  - Total: 23.18 km^{2} (8.95 sq mi)

Population (2011)
  - Total: 6,518
  - Density: 281.2/km^{2} (728.3/sq mi)

Languages
  - Official: Telugu
- Time zone: UTC+5:30 (IST)
- PIN: 523368
- Telephone code: +91–8405
- Vehicle registration: AP 27

Racherla is a village in Markapuram district of the Indian state of Andhra Pradesh. It is the mandal headquarters of Racharla mandal in Markapur revenue division.

== Geography ==
Racherla is located at 15.4667°N 78.9667°E. It has an average elevation of 224 metres (738 feet).
