= Komarolu =

- Village
- Interactive map of Komarolu
- Location in Andhra Pradesh, India Komarolu (India)
- Coordinates: 15.2667°N 79.0°E
- Country: India
- State: Andhra Pradesh
- District: Markapuram
- Mandal: Komarolu
- Elevation: 249 m (817 ft)

Population
  - Total

Languages
  - Official: Telugu
- Time zone: UTC+5:30 (IST)
- Postal Index Number: 523 373
- Telephone code: +91 8405
- Vehicle registration: AP

Komarolu is a village in Markapuram district of the Indian state of Andhra Pradesh. It is the mandal headquarters of Komarolu mandal in Markapur revenue division.

== Geography ==
Komarolu is located at 15.2667°N 79.0000°E. It has an average elevation of 249 metres (820 feet).

Komarolu is a mandal with several villages named as Taticherla, Akkapalle, Pottipalle, Nallaguntla etc.

== Demographics ==
According to the Indian census, 2011, the demographic details of Komarolu mandal is as follows:

- Total Population: 40,331 in 9,403 Households.
- Male Population: 20,892 and Female Population: 19,439
- Children Under 6-years of age: 5,034 Boys - 2,599 and Girls - 2,435)
- Total Literates: 20,863

Komarolu mandal had a population of 10746 in 2011.
