= Ongole revenue division =

Coordinates: 15°54′N 80°40′E

- revenue division in Prakasam district
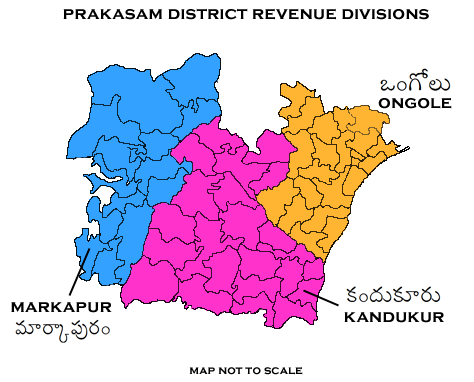
- Ongole revenue division in Prakasam district
- Country: India
- State: Andhra Pradesh
- District: Prakasam
- Headquarters: Ongole

Ongole revenue division (or Ongole division) is an administrative division in the Prakasam district of the Indian state of Andhra Pradesh. It is one of the 3 revenue divisions in the district which consists of 11 mandals under its administration. Ongole is the administrative headquarters of the division.

== Administration ==
The 11 mandals in the revenue division are:

Sl.No	Mandal name
1	Chimakurthi
2	Kothapatnam
3	Maddipadu
4	Naguluppalapadu
5	Ongole Urban
6	Tanguturu
7	Santhanuthalapadu
8	Kondapi
9	Ongole Rural
10	Singarayakonda
11	Zarugumalli

== See also ==
- List of revenue divisions in Andhra Pradesh
- List of mandals in Andhra Pradesh
