= Kandukur =

Kandukur Kandukuru
- Town
- Interactive map of Kandukur
- Location in Andhra Pradesh, India
- Coordinates: 15.2166650°N 79.9042°E
- Country: India
- State: Andhra Pradesh
- District: Parkasam

Government
  - Type: Municipal Council
  - Body: Kandukuru Municipal Council
  - Chairman: Vacant
  - Deputy Chairman: Vacant
  - MLA: Inturi Nageswar Rao (TDP)
  - MP: Vemireddy Prabhakar Reddy (TDP)

Area
  - Total: 33.06 km^{2} (12.76 sq mi)

Population (2011)
  - Total: 57,246
  - Rank: 26th (Towns in AP)
  - Density: 1,732/km^{2} (4,485/sq mi)
- Time zone: UTC+5:30 (IST)
- PIN: 523 105

Kandukur, natively known as Kandukuru, is a town in Prakasam district of the Indian state of Andhra Pradesh. It is a municipality and the headquarters of Kandukur mandal as well as Kandukur revenue division.

== Geography ==
Kandukuru (earlier known as Skandapuri) is located at 15.2165°N 79.9042°E. It has an average elevation of 13 metres (43 ft). Kandukur was a part of the erstwhile Nellore district and was then included in the newly carved out Prakasam District in 1970. Later as a part of the districts reorganization in 2022, it is now merged with the residual SPSR Nellore district. The total geographical area of Kandukur Municipality is 37.63 km^{2}.

== Demography ==
=== Population Distribution ===
Kandukur Mandal, is the 3rd most populous Mandal in Prakasam. As of 2017 India census, Prakasam District has a total population of 33,97,448 which is 6.84% of total population of Andhra Pradesh.Out of the total population of Prakasam District, 27,32,866 is in a rural area which is 80.44% of the total district, whereas 6,64,582 is in urban areas, which is 19.56%. There are a total of 56 Mandal in the Prakasam District. Kandukur Mandal has a total population of 98,769 which is 2.9% of the total district. There is only one urban area in Kandukur Mandal which is Kandukur Municipality. It has a population of 57,246 which is 57.96% of the Kandukur Mandal. The rural population in KandukurMunicipality is 41,523 which is 42.04% of the Kandukur Mandal. Among them, 28,644 (50.04%) are males and 28,602 (49.96%) are females.

=== Population Growth Rate ===
Kandukur Municipality is the second largest municipality in Prakasam District and was formed in 1987. population projections, the population trends for the last 3 decades are reviewed and analysed. The population trends and growth rate of the town as per the past trends, it is observed that Kandukur had a population of 32,370 in 1981 which increased to 41,336 with a growth rate of 27.70 in the year 1991. From 1991 to 2001 the population increased from41,336 to 50,336 with a growth rate of 21.75% and from 2001 to 2011 the population increased from 50,336to 57,246 with a growth rate of 13.75%. It can be thus incurred that though the population has increased population growth rate has declined.

=== Sex Ratio ===
Kandukur Municipality has a sex ratio of 999, meaning there are 999 females per 1000 males. The sex ratio for Kandukur Mandal is 989 which is less than the Kandukur Municipality. The sex ratio for Prakasam district, Andhra Pradesh state and India are 981, 993 and 943 respectively. Thus, the sex ratio in the Kandukur municipality area is higher than that compared to Mandal, district, state and all over India.

=== Literacy Rate ===
Kandukur Municipality has a total literacy rate of 67.31% which is higher than the total literacy rate of Kandukur Mandal and Prakasam District. However, the literacy rate is less than the literacy rate of India. Also, a gap is observed between the male and female literacy rate in Kandukur Municipality. The male literacy rate is 73.75% and the female literacy rate is 61.09%. Thus, the literacy gap between males and females in Kandukur Municipality is 12.44%.

== Governance ==
=== Civic administration ===
Kandukuru Municipal Council is the seat of the local government which administers Kavali town. Kandhukur is a 2nd-grade municipality and 3rd largest Municipality in the Prakasam district, with 57315 populations with an extent of 60.32 km^{2}. It is the Mandal headquarter for the Kandukur Mandal. Kandukur Municipality is divided into 30 wards. Among them, ward no.28 is highly populous with an area of 8.15 km^{2}.

=== Planning ===
The Master Plan for Kandukur was approved with a plan period of 20 years, for an area of 60 km^{2}. Kandukur is a Municipality Town and also a Mandal Headquarter in Prakasam District which provides it with the opportunity to grow further. Around 60% of the Mandal population resided in the town. The maximum area is Residential and Urbanisable Use. In Kandukur Town, out of the total, around 55% area is open Land, 37% area is Agriculture Land and only 5% area is under Built-up. It will give land availability for future development. The majority of agriculture in Kandukur is for "Jamboil" which is a major component in the production of paper. With upcoming industrial areas in the proximity (Krishnapatnam port and surrounding), there are better scopes for development in terms of Infrastructure as well as employment generation. To achieve the Goal of Electronic Governance for all the Services of the ULBs, large Scale and detailed GIS Base Maps have been required. To achieve this purpose, the Government have already prepare GIS Base Maps for all 110 Urban Local Bodies of Andhra Pradesh under AMRUT Scheme. Kandukur is one of the selected ULBs under GIS based Master Plan. DT&CP has taken the initiative to prepare a Revised Master Plan for the year 2041, and selected Design and Planning Counsel, Ahmedabad through tender. The overall objective of the Kandukur Master Plan is to create enabling spatial and land use planning framework to achieve the Vision of Kandukur Master Plan in order to promote, guide and rationalize planned development, to encourage existing economic activities to grow by providing adequate infrastructure in terms of the road network and preservation of other natural features. Also, to formulate infrastructure projects addressing the needs of water, solid waste collection, drainage etc.

== Economy ==
=== Socio-Economic Profile ===
The total number of Households in Kandukur Municipality as per the 2011 census is 13,934. The average household size in Kandukur Municipality is 3.8 persons per household. The majority of the population in Kandukur Municipality is Hindu which is 315 (67%). Other religions are Muslim and Christian which are 108 (23%) and 50 (10%) respectively. Maximum households are engaged in other daily wage activities. They do not have permanent jobs or their own businesses. Maximum households have monthly income within a range of Rs. 10,001 to Rs. 20,000.

== Education ==
The primary and secondary school education is imparted by government, aided and private schools, under the School Education Department of the state. There are a total of 26 schools in Kandukur, out of which 19 are private schools and 7 are government. Zilla Parishad Girls High School is a government secondary school in Kandukur. Aditya Kandukoori High School is a private, boys-only secondary school in Kandukur, recognized for innovation and STEM. It was named after Aditya Kandukoori, the founder of MoCo Innovation. The school provides education as per the state syllabus and implements government welfare schemes such as the Mid-Day Meal Programme to support students’ nutrition. The institution aims to improve access to education for girls in the region.implements the Mid-Day Meal Programme

== Connectivity ==
Kandukur (earlier known as Skandapuri) is located on the Southern side of Vijaywada in Prakasam District. It is connected by State Highway to Kanigiri by SH 35 which connects Kandukur to Kanigiri on the Western side and links to NH16 towards the East. Kandukur is connected by 2 other State Highways which connect Kandukur to Pamur towards the South-West side by Kandukur-Pamur Road and Gudluru and Thettu by Kandukur-Gudluru-Thettu road towards the Southern side.

National Highway 167B, which starts at Mydukuru passes through the town and eventually terminates at National Highway 16 which is part of Golden Quadrilateral highway network on the outskirts of Singarayakonda. APSRTC is a major Bus station in Kandukur.

The nearest Railway Station to Kandukur is Singarayakonda. This Railway Station is classified as a B–category station in the Vijayawada Railway Division of the South Central Railway Zone. Singrayakonda is connected 10 km by road. The other nearest railway station is - Markapur - 60 km far by road. Ongole is about 45 km and Singarayakonda is 15 km away from Kandukur. A new Railway Station is coming up in Kanigiri under the new Railway Line project of the Nadikudi–Srikalahasti section.

Vijayawada Airport is the closest airport to Kandukur, around 210 km. Other International Airports nearby airports are Hyderabad, Tirupati and Chennai. All these airports have good connectivity with major Indian cities like Delhi, Mumbai, Kolkata, Banglore and other International Cities. There is a proposal for a Green Field Domestic Airport at Ongole, which is near around 45 km away from Kandukur.

== See also ==
- List of towns in Andhra Pradesh
- List of municipalities in Andhra Pradesh
