= Kandukur revenue division =

Coordinates: 15.2167°N 79.9042°E

Kandukur Revenue Division
- revenue division in Prakasam district
- Interactive map of Kandukur Revenue Division
- Country: India
- State: Andhra Pradesh
- District: Prakasam

Kandukur Revenue Division (or Kandukur Division) is an administrative division in the Prakasam district of the Indian state of Andhra Pradesh. It is one of the 3 revenue divisions in the district which consists of 7 mandals.

== History ==
Kandukur Revenue division originally was a part of Prakasam district. On April 4th 2022, it became part of SPSR Nellore district. On Dec 31st 2025, it reverted to Prakasam district with 7 mandals.

== Administration ==
Kandukur is the administrative headquarters of the division. There are 7 mandals in Kandukuru revenue division.

6. Kandukuru
Sl.No	Mandal name
1	Marripudi
2	Kandukur
3	Gudluru
4	Ulavapadu
5	Ponnaluru
6	Voletivaripalem
7	Lingasamudram

== See also ==
- List of revenue divisions in Andhra Pradesh
- List of mandals in Andhra Pradesh
