= Darsi =

Town in Prakasam district, India

- Town
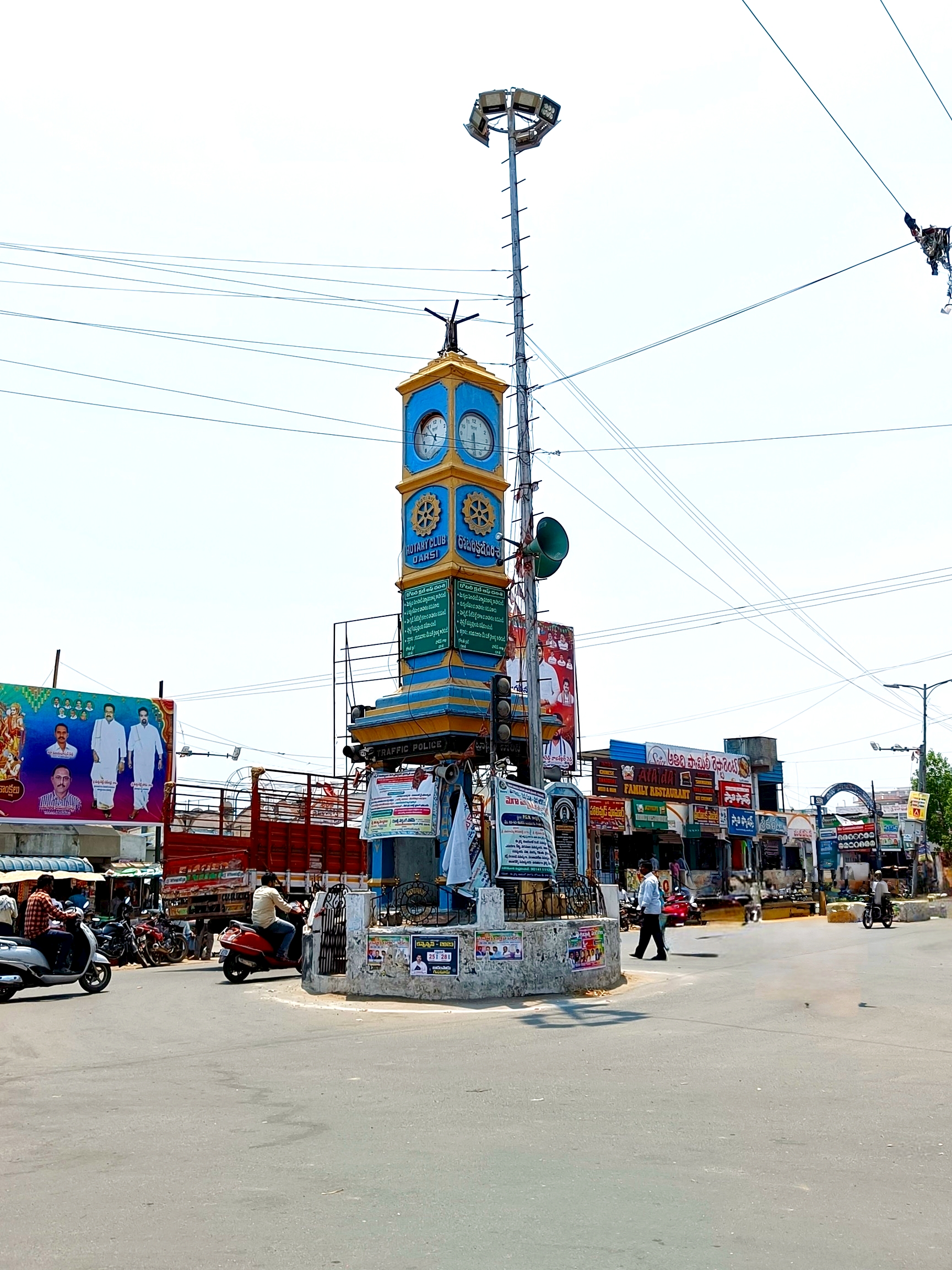
- Clock tower, Darsi
- Interactive map of Darsi
- Location in Andhra Pradesh, India Darsi (India)
- Coordinates: 15.7667°N 79.6833°E
- Country: India
- State: Andhra Pradesh
- District: Prakasam
- Mandal: Darsi
- Incorporated (Municipality): 2020

Government
  - Type: Municipal Council
  - Body: Darsi Municipal Council

Area
  - Total: 46.4 km^{2} (17.9 sq mi)
- Elevation: 110 m (360 ft)

Population (2011)
  - Total: 33,418
  - Density: 720/km^{2} (1,870/sq mi)

Languages
  - Official: Telugu
- Time zone: UTC+5:30 (IST)
- PIN: 523247
- Telephone code: +91–8407
- Vehicle registration: AP 39, AP 40

Darsi is a municipality town in Prakasam district of the Indian state of Andhra Pradesh. It is the mandal headquarters of Darsi mandal in Kanigiri revenue division. It is located at the foot of the Nallamala Hills. It is approximately 60 kilometres (37 mi) away from Ongole and approx. 33 kilometres (21 mi) away from Addanki.

== Geography ==
Darsi is located at 15.7667°N 79.6833°E in the Prakasam district of Andhra Pradesh. Darsi is a town at the foot of the Nallamala Hills. It is a plain region in the coromandal region. It is surrounded by small mountain ranges to the north and Pulipadu Pond to the east.

== History ==
Before British rule, Darsi was called Darshanapuri, named by an ancient Andhra king.

== Economy ==
Agriculture is the primary occupation of the residents. Dairy farming is also a common allied occupation. There are at least six milk processing centers, which export milk to distant places such as Hyderabad. Many clothing stores and jewellery shops are present on Pottisriramulu Street. Darsi is also home to a few hospitals.

Darsi has many branches of India's biggest banks including: SBI, HDFC Bank, Axis Bank, ICICI Bank, Union Bank of India, Andhra Bank and Punjab National Bank and Andhra Pragathi Grameena Bank.

== Education ==
There are 11 public primary schools, 12 private primary schools, one government high school, 12 private high schools, three public secondary schools, and three private secondary schools. There is also an Andhra Pradesh Model School in Darsi.

== Assembly constituency ==
Darsi is an assembly constituency in Andhra Pradesh, one of 12 in Prakasam district. In the last elections, YSRCP (YSR Congress) candidate Buchepalli Siva Prasad Reddy won by a margin of 2456 votes against Gottipati Lakshmi.

== Water source ==
The residents primarily depend on the Nagarjuna Sagar's Jawahar canal for both irrigation & drinking. It passes through Darsi. The town receives most rainfall from mid-July to September. It typically receives approx. 22.51 millimetres (0.886 in) of precipitation annually. There is also a freshwater lake built by the Netherlands Government.

== Transport ==
Buses stop near Clock tower, where Podili Road, Kurichedu Road and Lankojanapalli Roads intersect. APSRTC bus station is in Auto Nagar on Darsi - Addanki Road. The railway line, Nadikudi-Srikalahasthi will pass through the town when it finishes construction.

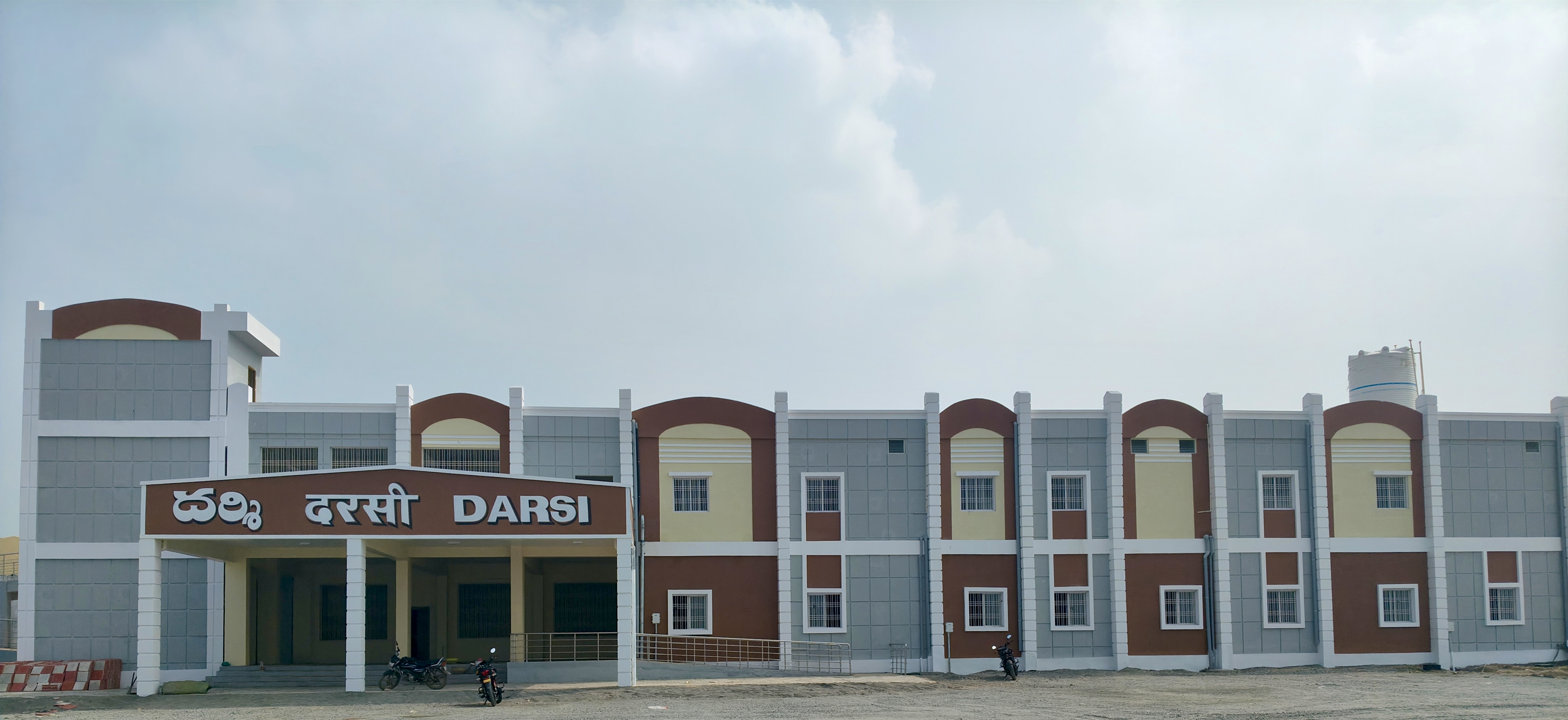
Darsi Railway station
