= Prakasam district =

- District of Andhra Pradesh
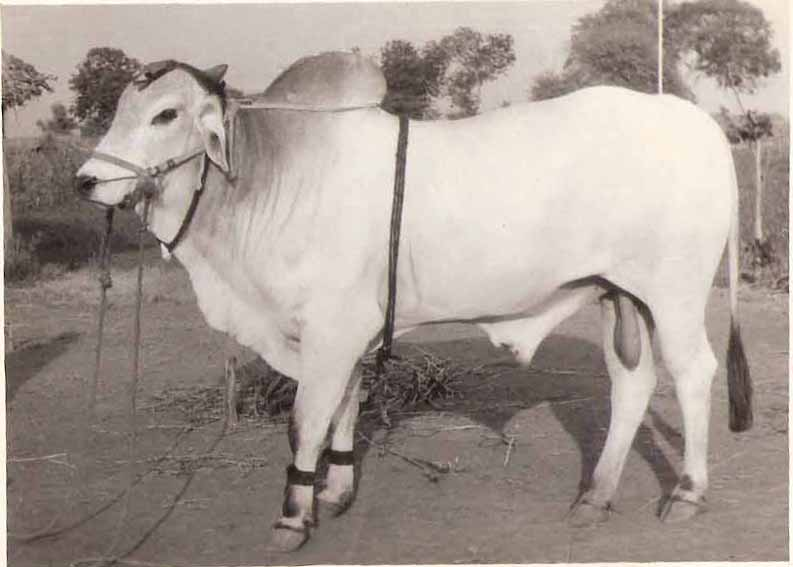
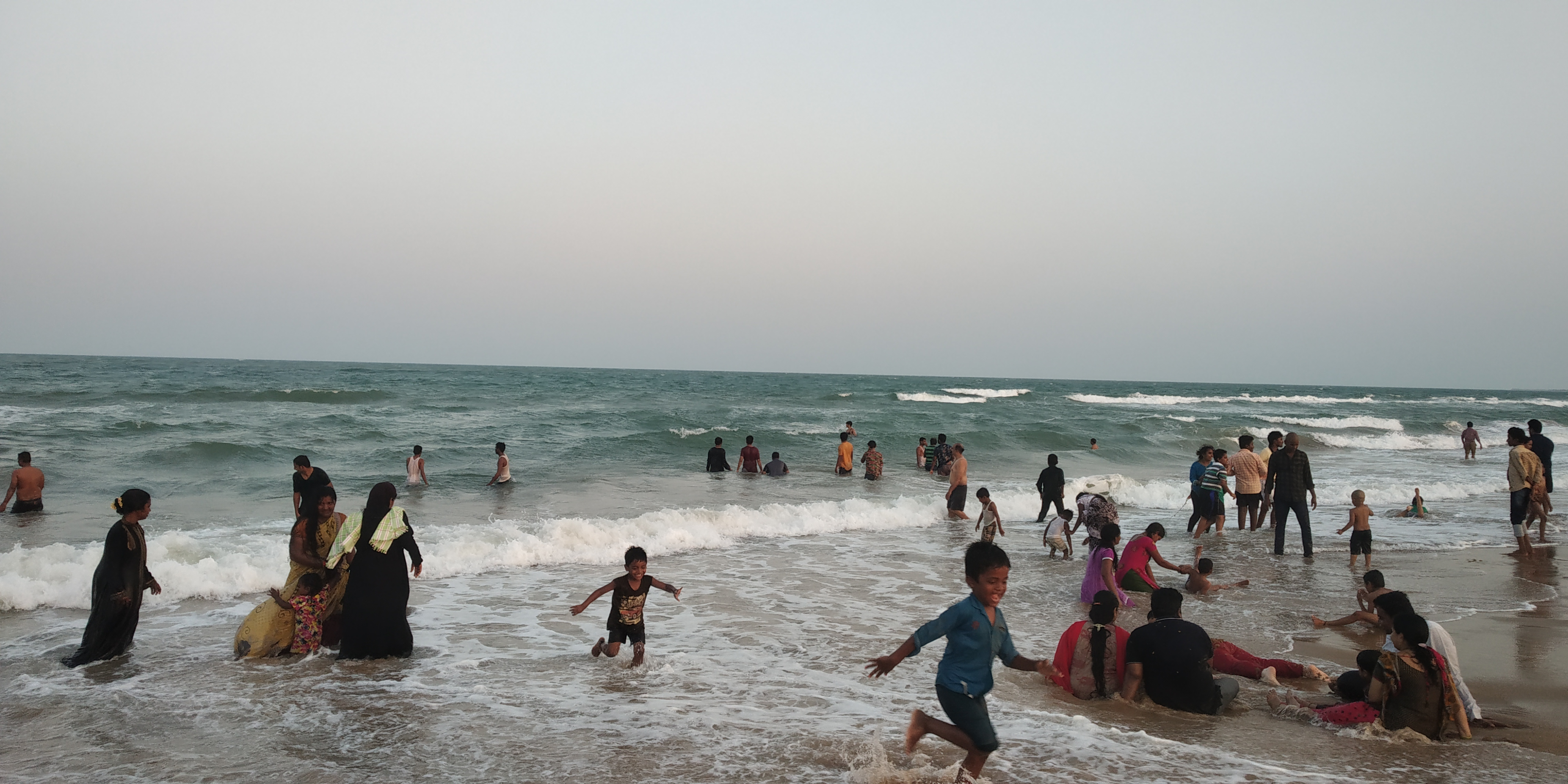
- Clockwise from top-left: Ongolu breed of cattle, Beach in Pakala

- Location of Prakasam district in Andhra Pradesh
- Interactive map of Prakasam district
- Coordinates (Ongolu): 15°30′N 80°03′E
- Country: India
- State: Andhra Pradesh
- Region: Coastal Andhra
- Established: 2 February 1970
- 1st Reorganized: 4 April 2022
- 2nd Reorganized: 31 December 2025
- Named for: Tanguturi Prakasam
- Headquarters: Ongolu
- Mandalas: 27

Government
  - Collector: P.Raja babu, IAS
  - Superintendent of Police: V.Harshavardhan Raju, IPS
  - Parliament constituencies: Ongolu, Bapatla, Nellore
  - Assembly constituencies: 06

Area
  - Total: 14,322 km^{2} (5,530 sq mi)

Population (2011)
  - Total: 2,288,026
  - Density: 159.76/km^{2} (413.77/sq mi)
  - Urban: 19.44%
- Time zone: UTC+5:30 (IST)
- Vehicle registration: AP-27 (former); AP–39 (from 30 January 2019)
- Major highways: NH-16
- District LGD code: 517
- District abbreviation: PRA
- Website: prakasam.ap.gov.in

Prakasam district named in honour of Tanguturi Prakasam is in the coastal Andhra region of the Indian state of Andhra Pradesh. It was reorganised on 4 April 2022 and 31 December 2025. The headquarters of the district is Ongole. It is bounded by Bapatla, Palnadu, Markapuram, Sri Potti Sriramulu Nellore districts and Bay of Bengal.

== Etymology ==
The district was named after Tanguturi Prakasam, also known as 'Andhra Kesari', an Indian freedom fighter who served as the first chief minister of Andhra State, who was born in the village of Vinodarayunipalem. It was accordingly renamed as Prakasam District in 1972.

== History ==
Prakasam district was originally constituted on 2 February 1970, carved out of Guntur, Nellore and Kurnool districts of Andhra Pradesh. It was carved out of three taluks of Guntur district, i.e. Addanki, Chirala, and Ongole, four taluks of Nellore district, i.e. Kandukur, Kanigiri, Darsi and Podili and three taluks of Kurnool district i.e. Markapur, Yarragondapalem and Giddaluru. It is one of the nine districts in the Coastal Andhra region of undivided Andhra Pradesh. It was restructured in 2022, where few mandals were merged into Bapatla district and SPSR Nellore district, some of which were restored in the restructure effected on 31 December 2025. In the second restructure Markapuram district was carved out.

Naxalite activity in Prakasam district used to be high during 2000s.

== Geography ==
Prakasam district following 2022 district restructure occupied an area of 14,322 square kilometres (5,530 sq mi). After 2025 district reorganisation, it is bounded by Markapuram district in the west, SPSR Nellore district in the south west, Palnadu in the north, Bapatla district in the north east, and Bay of Bengal in the south.

The district has 50 kilometres of coastline. Kothapatnam of Kothapatnam Mandal and Pakala of Singarayakonda Mandal are prominent beaches. Gundlakamma, Musi and Paleru are the major rivers in the district. Smaller rivers such as the Thammileru, Sagileru and Gudisileru and streams like Ogeruvagu, Nallavagu and Vedimangala Vagu also flow in the district.

=== Climate ===
Before the district restructure effective on 30th December 2025, the district has a moderate climate in the coastal areas and a hot climate in the non-coastal areas. The normal maximum and minimum temperatures recorded in the district are 40.20 C and 20.30 C respectively. The maximum temperature is usually recorded in the months of April - June. The district receives its rainfall mostly from South West and North-East monsoon. The normal rainfall is 366.2 mm and 384.7 mm respectively.

=== Flora and fauna ===
Orchids, casuarinas and cashew plantations are common in the coastal areas.

=== Irrigation ===
Nagarjuna Sagar Project and Krishna Western Delta are major irrigation projects. Mopadu Reservoir, Paleru-Bitragunta Anicut, and Cumbum Tank are major sources of medium irrigation.

=== Mineral resources ===
Chimakurthi is known for its granite reserves.The minerals found in the district are Baryte, iron ore, quartz, and silica sand.

== Demographics ==
Population Growth
Year	Pop.	±% p.a.
1901	975,037	—
1911	1,068,743	+0.92%
1921	1,117,701	+0.45%
1931	1,205,223	+0.76%
1941	1,343,883	+1.09%
1951	1,463,737	+0.86%
1961	1,671,726	+1.34%
1971	1,919,995	+1.39%
1981	2,329,571	+1.95%
1991	2,759,166	+1.71%
2001	3,059,423	+1.04%
2011	3,397,448	+1.05%

Languages of Prakasam district (2011), updated for 2025 restructure
1. Telugu (94.46%)
2. Urdu (4.38%)
3. Others (1.16%)

Religions in Prakasam district (2011), updated for 2025 restructure
Religion	Percent
Hinduism	93.99%
Islam	5.19%
Christianity	0.59%
Other or not stated	0.23%
Distribution of religions

Based on 2011 census numbers updated for restructure in 2025, the district had a population of 1,719,257, of which 292,135 (16.99%) lived in urban areas. The sex ratio is 984 females per 1000 males. Scheduled Castes and Scheduled Tribes make up 439,224 (25.55%) and 74,949 (4.36%) respectively.

94.46% of the population spoke Telugu and 4.38% Urdu as their first language in the undivided district. Hinduism is the majority religion, while Christianity is a significant (mostly underreported) minority of around 15-20% and there is a small Muslim population.

== Economy ==
The Gross district domestic product (GDDP) of the undivided district for the FY 2013-14 was ₹35,962 crore (US$3.8 billion) and it contributed 6.9% to the Gross state domestic product (GSDP). The per capita income at current prices was ₹85,765 (US$920). The primary, secondary and tertiary sectors of the district contribute ₹12,875 crore (US$1.4 billion), ₹7,897 crore (US$840 million) and ₹15,190 crore (US$1.6 billion), respectively. The major products that contributed to the GVA of the district from agriculture and allied services were, tobacco, paddy, chillies, batavia, milk, meat and fisheries. The GVA from the industrial and service sector was contributed from construction, minor minerals, unorganised trade and ownership of dwellings.

=== Industries ===
The district has many service industries such as industrial testing, electrical appliance repair, clinical laboratories, servicing of computer hardware, tourism, and hospitality. Major exports from the district include seafood, processed tobacco, granite blocks, granite monuments and yarn. There are many industries of food and agriculture, mineral, chemical, leather, plastic and rubber, engineering, cotton and textiles, electronic products. All these industries deal with prawn and fish processing and canning, dairy products, the granite industry, pharmaceuticals, tanning, fishing nets, surgical cotton, etc. Forest-based industries produce Ayurvedic medicines, essential oil (Palm Rose Oil), wooden furniture, wooden toys, bamboo products, etc.

=== Mining ===
The district leads in granite mining in the state. Galaxy Granite is found in the Chimakurthy area of the district.

== Politics ==
=== Parliament constitutencies ===
The district is part of Ongole, Bapatla, and Nellore Lok Sabha constituencies.

=== Assembly segments ===
Assembly segments
Constituency number	Name	Reserved for (SC/ST/None)	Parliament
103	Darsi	None	Ongole
105	Addanki	None	Bapatla
107	Santhanuthalapadu	SC	Bapatla
108	Ongole	None	Ongole
109	Kandukur	None	Nellore
110	Kondapi	SC	Ongole

== Administrative divisions ==
The district comprises three revenue divisions, Addanki, Kandukur, and Ongole. There are a total of 28 mandals in the district, with 10 in the Addanki division, 7 in the Kandukur division, and 11 in the Ongole division. Urban administrative divisions of Panchayatraj include Ongole (Municipal Corporation), Addanki (Municipality), Kandukur (Municipality) and 2 Nagar panchayats for Chimakurthy and Darsi. The rural administrative divisions of Panchayatraj include 715 Gram Panchayats. There are about 769 Inhabited Revenue villages in the district.

=== Mandals ===
The mandals in Prakasam district under each revenue division are listed in the following tables:

1. Ongole
Sl.No	Mandal name
1	Chimakurthi
2	Kothapatnam
3	Maddipadu
4	Naguluppalapadu
5	Ongole Urban
6	Tanguturu
7	Santhanuthalapadu
8	Kondapi
9	Ongole Rural
10	Singarayakonda
11	Zarugumalli

2. Addanki
Sl.No	Mandal name
1	Darsi
2	Donakonda
3	Thallur
4	Mundlamuru
5	Santhamaguluru
6	Kurichedu
7	Ballikurava
8	Addanki
9	J. Panguluru
10	Korisapadu

6. Kandukuru
Sl.No	Mandal name
1	Marripudi
2	Kandukur
3	Gudluru
4	Ulavapadu
5	Ponnaluru
6	Voletivaripalem
7	Lingasamudram

=== Cities and towns ===
Cities and towns in Prakasam District
Ciy/Town	Civil status	Revenue Division	Population (2011)
Ongole	Municipal corporation	Ongole	2,08,344
Addanki	Municipality	Addanki	60,022
Darsi	Municipality	Addanki	33,418
Kandukur	Municipality	Kandukur	57,315
Chimakurthy	Municipality	Ongole	30,279

== Transport ==
The total road length of state highways in the undivided district is 1,184 km (736 mi). The district is well connected by national highways, state highways and district roads as well. The NH 16 passes through Ongole which is the major highway connecting the cities of Howrah and Chennai, a part of Asian Highway Network AH45.

The district has a rail network of 406 km (252 mi). The entire rail network is under the South Central Railway zone. Ongole is one of the main stations of this district and most of the stations are under Vijayawada railway division.

== Education ==
The primary and secondary school education is imparted by government, aided and private schools, under the state's School Education Department. As per the school information report for the academic year 2015–16, there are a total of 4,311 schools. They include, 33 government, 2,949 mandal and zilla parishads, 1 residential, 1079 private, 10 model, 37 Kasturba Gandhi Balika Vidyalaya (KGBV), 50 municipal and 152 other types of schools. The total number of students enrolled in primary, upper primary and high schools of the district are 562,510. The total number of students enrolled in primary, upper primary and high schools of the district are 461,065.

Rajeev Gandhi University of Knowledge Technologies, Ongole campus is at Santhanuthalapadu. Andhra Kesari University was approved in 2021.

== Tourism ==
Prakasam district tourist places (After zoom, move mouse to get more details)

Prasannanjaneya swamy temple at Singarakonda near Addanki is a popular pilgrimage center. This temple was said to be constructed in the 15th century by Vijayanagara king Devarayalu. Mahasivaratri is celebrated in a grand manner at Ganga Bhramarambha Sameta Malleswara Swamy temple, Manikeswaram

== Some notable people ==
- Tanguturi Prakasam: a freedom fighter who was also the first Chief Minister of Andhra State and Chief Minister of Madras Presidency
- Mokshagundam Viswesvarayya: a prominent civil engineer who built and planned many projects like the Tirupati ghat roads and more
- U. Aswathanarayana: director of the Mahadevan International Centre for Water Resources Management in India.
- Bhanumathi Ramakrishna: a film actress who was also a producer, director and singer
- D. Ramanaidu: a film producer
- Tottempudi Krishna: a film director and editor
- Tottempudi Gopichand: a film actor known for his antagonistic roles in the films, Jayam (2002) and Varsham (2004)
- Giri Babu: a film actor
- Raghu Babu: a film actor and comedian in Telugu cinema
- Dharmavarapu Subramanyam: a comedian in Telugu cinema
- Pullela Gopichand: an all-england champion and national badminton coach
- Yarlagadda Nayudamma: a consultant paediatric surgeon. Former HRD Minister in the UPA 2 government
- Daggubati Purandeswari: daughter of N. T. Rama Rao and is married to Daggubati Venkateswara Rao
- GVL Narsimha Rao: a BJP politician.
