= List of towns in Andhra Pradesh by population =

Towns in Andhra Pradesh, India, are as follows:

The 2011 Census of India, conducted by The Office of the Registrar General and Census Commissioner, under the Ministry of Home Affairs, Government of India, determined that settlements with a population of less than 100,000 are called towns.

Yemmiganur is the most populated town with a population of 95,149.

== List of towns ==
The towns written in bold are the headquarters of their respective district.

S.No.	Name of the Town	District	Population 2011 Census	Area (km^{2})	Density (/km^{2})	Settlement Type	Formation
1	Yemmiganur	Kurnool	95,149	14.50	6,600	Municipality	1965
2	Chirala	Bapatla	120000	13.26	7,000	Municipality	1948
3	Rayachoti	Annamayya	91,234	39.78	2,300	Municipality	
4	Kavali	Nellore	104,099	22.95	3,900	Municipality	1967
5	Kadiri	Sri Sathya Sai	89,429	25.88	3,500	Municipality	
6	**Anakapalli**	Anakapalli	86,519	23.28	3,700	Municipality	
7	Palakollu	West Godavari	81,199	19.49	4,200	Municipality	
8	Srikalahasti	Tirupati	80,056	12.92	6,200	Municipality	
9	Tanuku	West Godavari	77,962	16.78	4,600	Municipality	
10	Gudur	Nellore	74,037	57.48	1,300	Municipality	
11	**Markapuram**	Markapuram	71,092	22.85	3,100	Municipality	1964
12	**Bapatla**	Bapatla	107000	17.92	3,900	Municipality	1951
13	Badvel	Kadapa	70,626	60.93	1,200	Municipality	
14	Pulivendula	Kadapa	65,706	58.69	1,100	Municipality	
15	Tadepalle	Guntur	64,149	25.45	2,500	Municipality	
16	Piduguralla	Palnadu	63,103	31.49	2,000	Municipality	
17	Vinukonda	Palnadu	62,550	37.53	1,700	Municipality	
18	Nagari	Chittoor	62,253	29.86	2,100	Municipality	
19	Rayadurgam	Anantapuram	61,749	49.73	1,200	Municipality	
20	Pileru	Annamayya	60,253	5.85	10,000	Panchayath	
21	Ponnur	Guntur	59,913	26.14	2,300	Municipality	
22	Dhone	Nandyal	59,272	5	12,000	Municipality	2005
23	Narasapuram	West Godavari	58,770	11.32	5,200	Municipality	
24	Nuzvid	Eluru	58,590	8.69	6,700	Municipality	
25	Palasa	Srikakulam	57,507	32.75	1,800	Municipality	2000
26	Macherla	Palnadu	57,290	13.48	4,300	Municipality	
27	Kandukuru	Prakasam	57,246	33.06	1,700	Municipality	1987
28	Samarlakota	Kakinada	56,864	14.08	4,000	Municipality	
29	Bobbili	Vizianagaram	56,819	25.60	2,200	Municipality	1956
30	Sattenapalle	Palnadu	56,721	21.88	2,600	Municipality	
31	Mandapeta	East Godavari	56,063	21.65	2,600	Municipality	
32	Pithapuram	Kakinada	54,859	22.71	2,400	Municipality	
33	Punganur	Annamayya	54,746	32.28	1,700	Municipality	
34	Puttur	Tirupati	54.092	43.29	1,200	Municipality	
35	Rajampet	Kadapa	54,050	10	5,400	Municipality	2017
36	Palamaner	Chittoor	54,035	17.69	3,100	Municipality	
37	**Parvathipuram**	Parvathipuram Manyam	53,844	11.24	4,800	Municipality	
38	Jaggayyapeta	NTR	53,530	23.50	2,300	Municipality	
39	Payakaraopeta	Anakapalli	52,458	48.02	7,600	Panchayath	1950
40	**Amalapuram**	Konaseema	53,231	7.02	7,600	Municipality	
41	Venkatagiri	Tirupati	52,688	25.89	2,000	Municipality	
42	Repalle	Bapatla	50,866	10.97	4,600	Municipality	1965

== Gallery ==
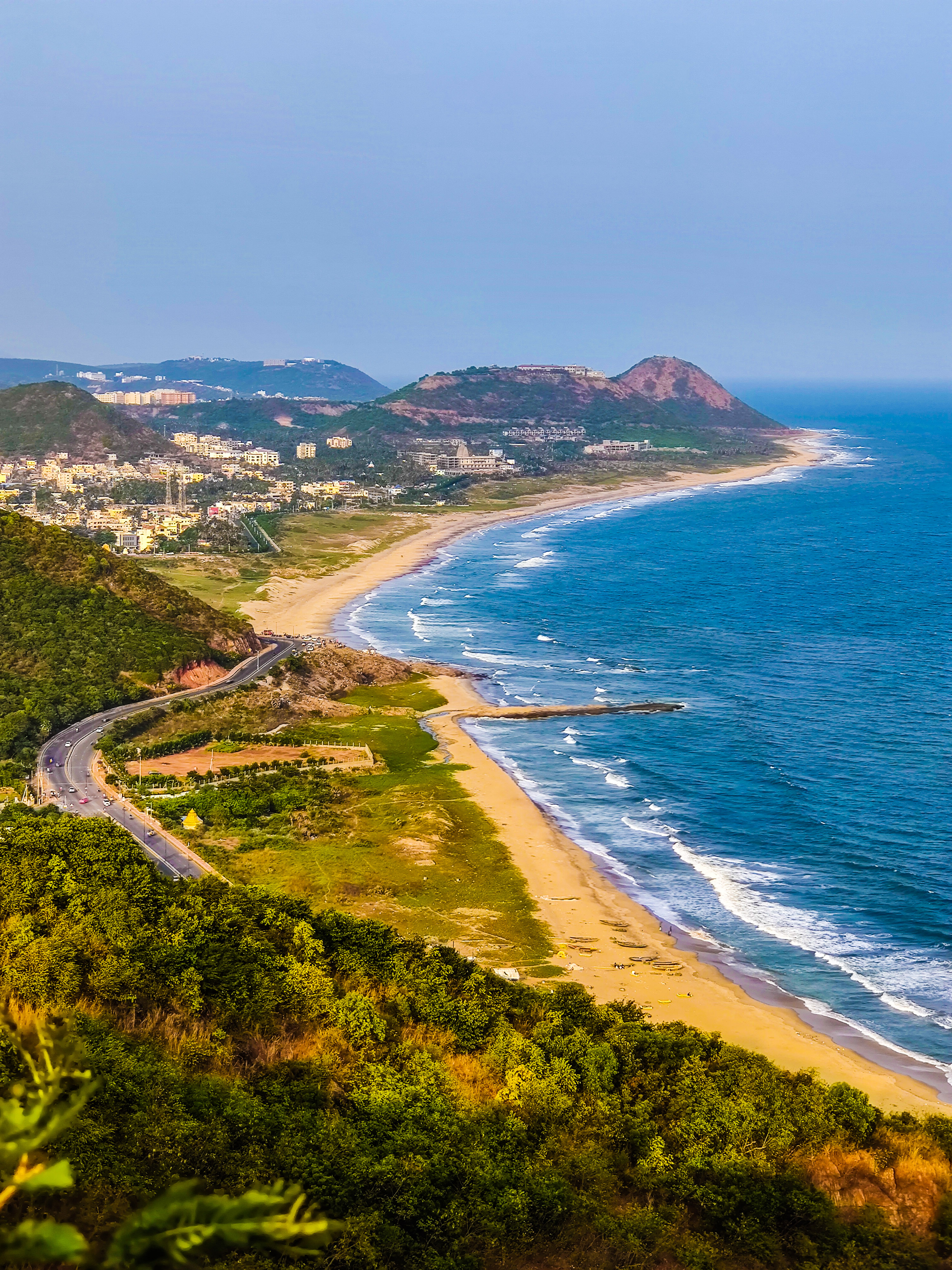
Visakhapatnam view from Kailasagiri Hill

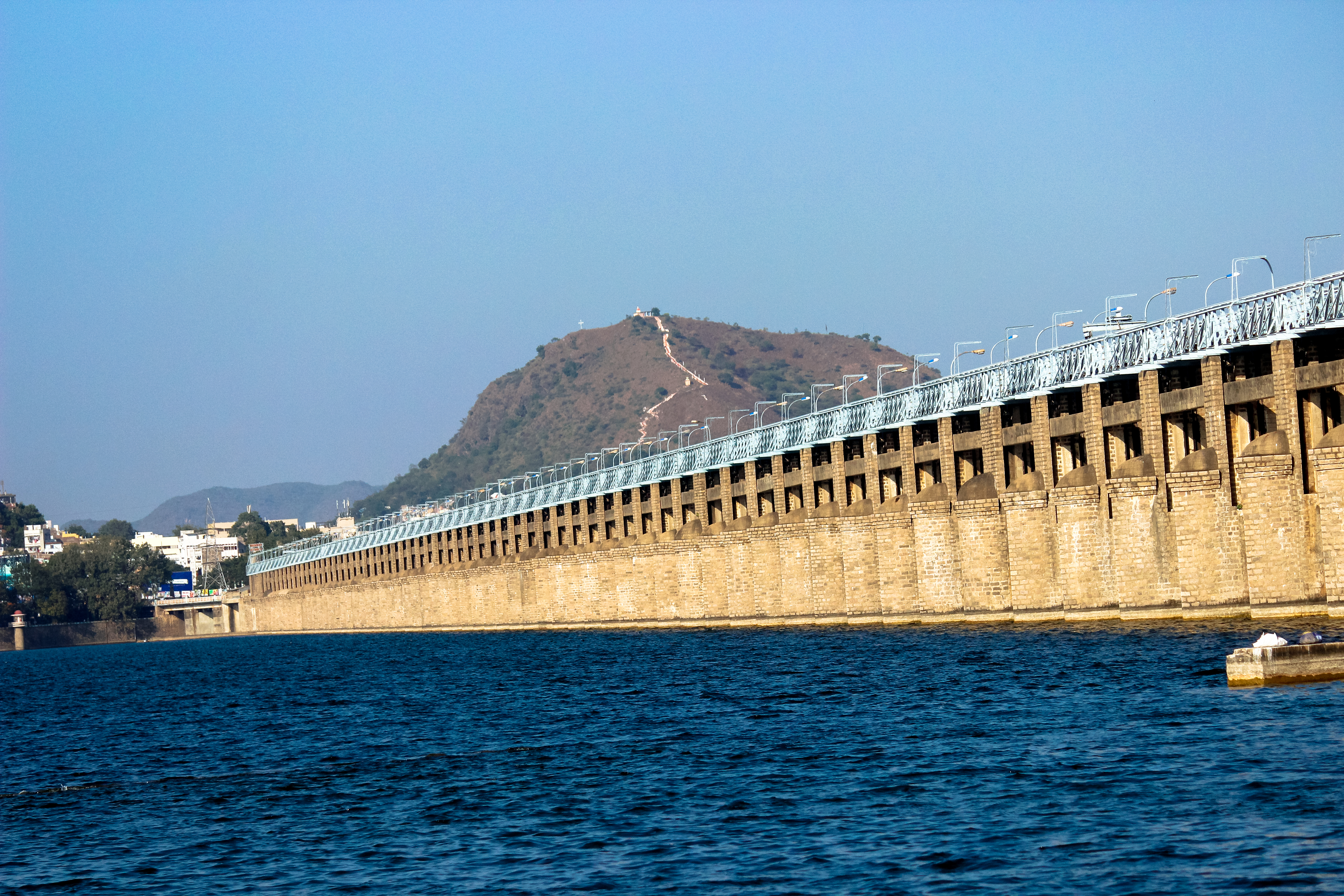
Prakasam Barrage, Vijayawada

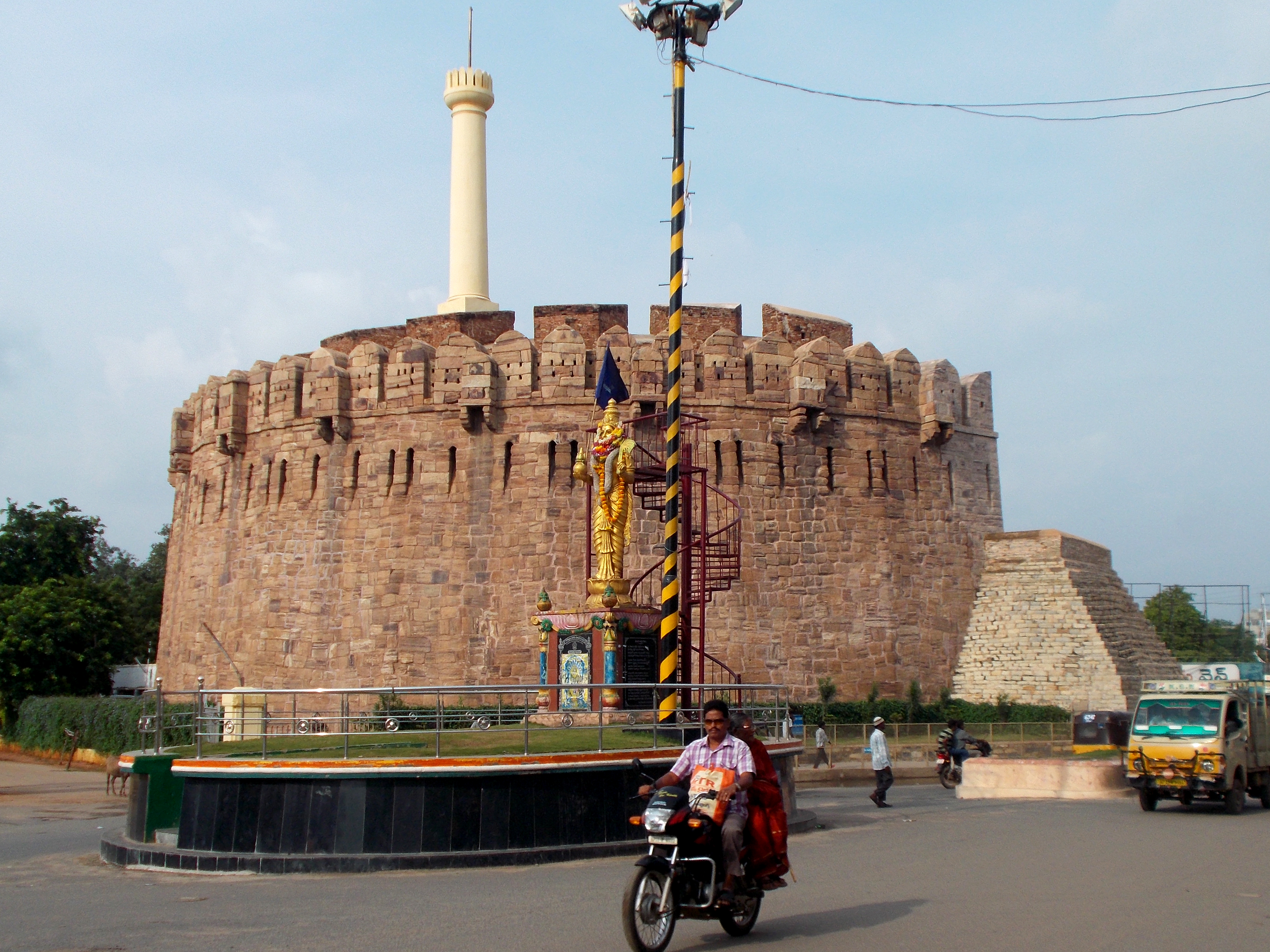
Konda Reddy Buruju, Kurnool

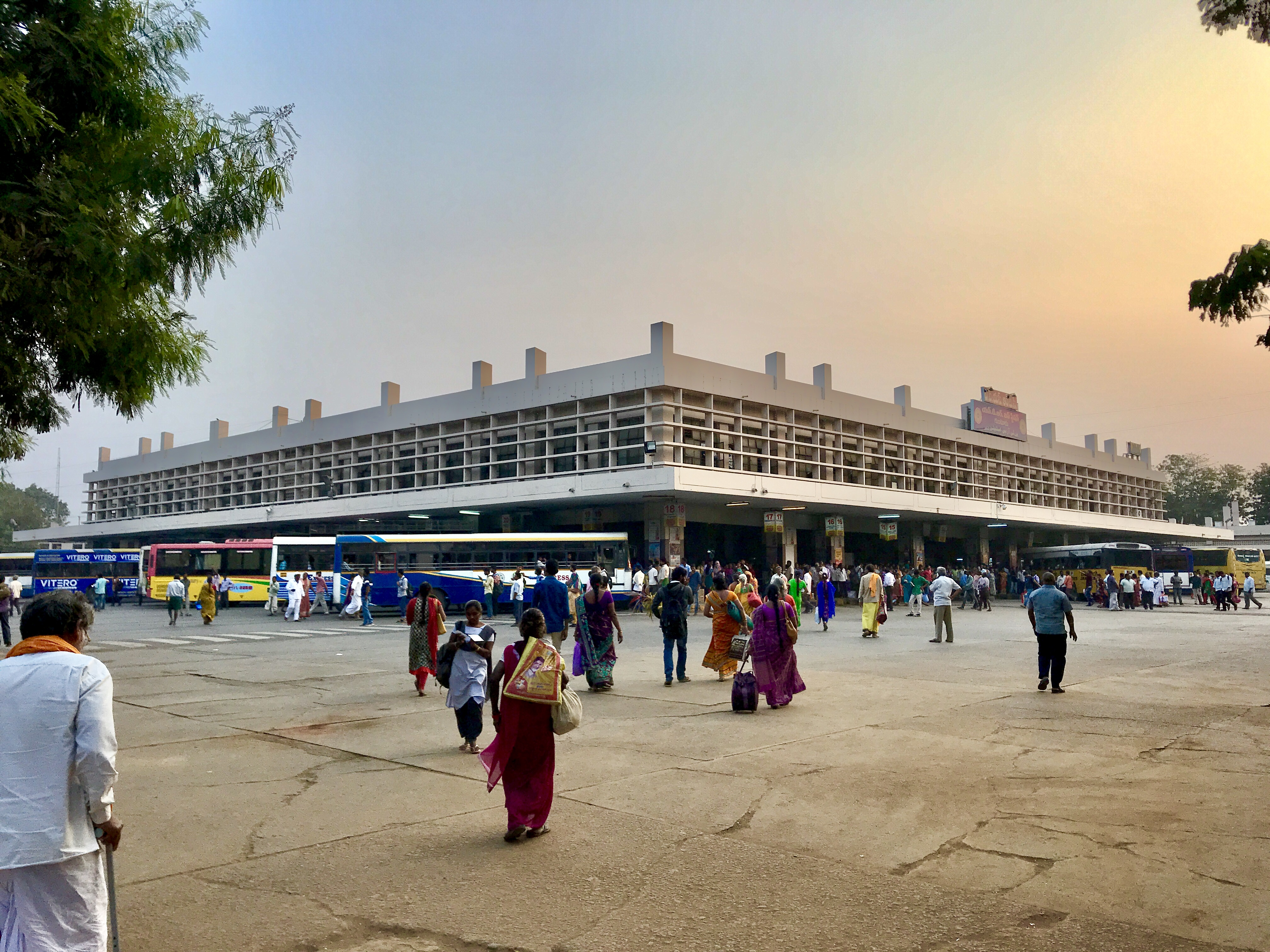
NTR Bus Station, Guntur

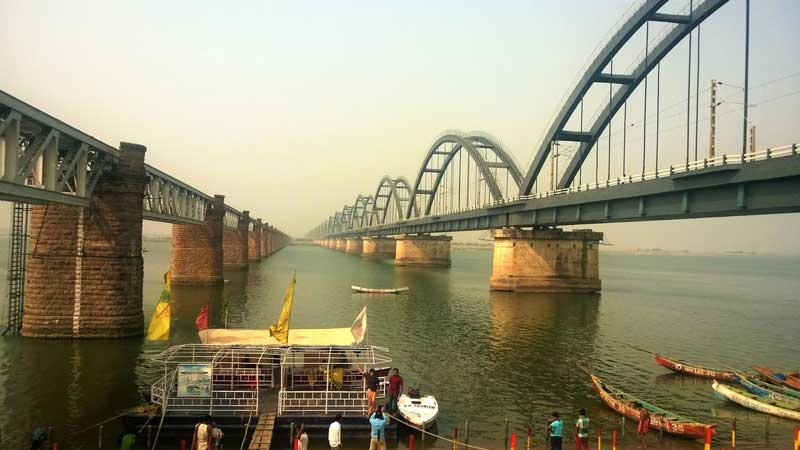
Godavari Bridge, Rajamahendravaram

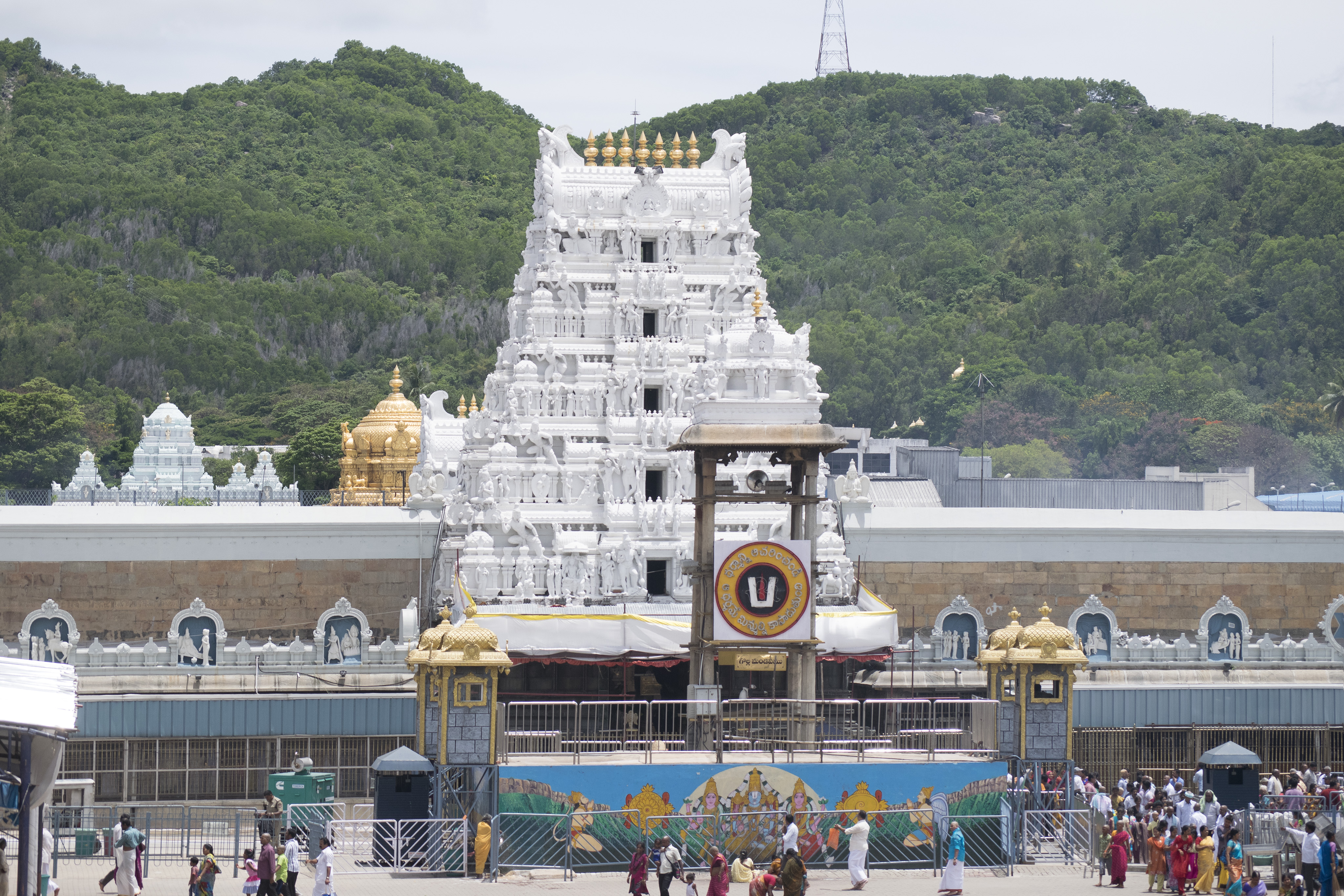
Tirumala Tirupati Devasthanam, Tirupati

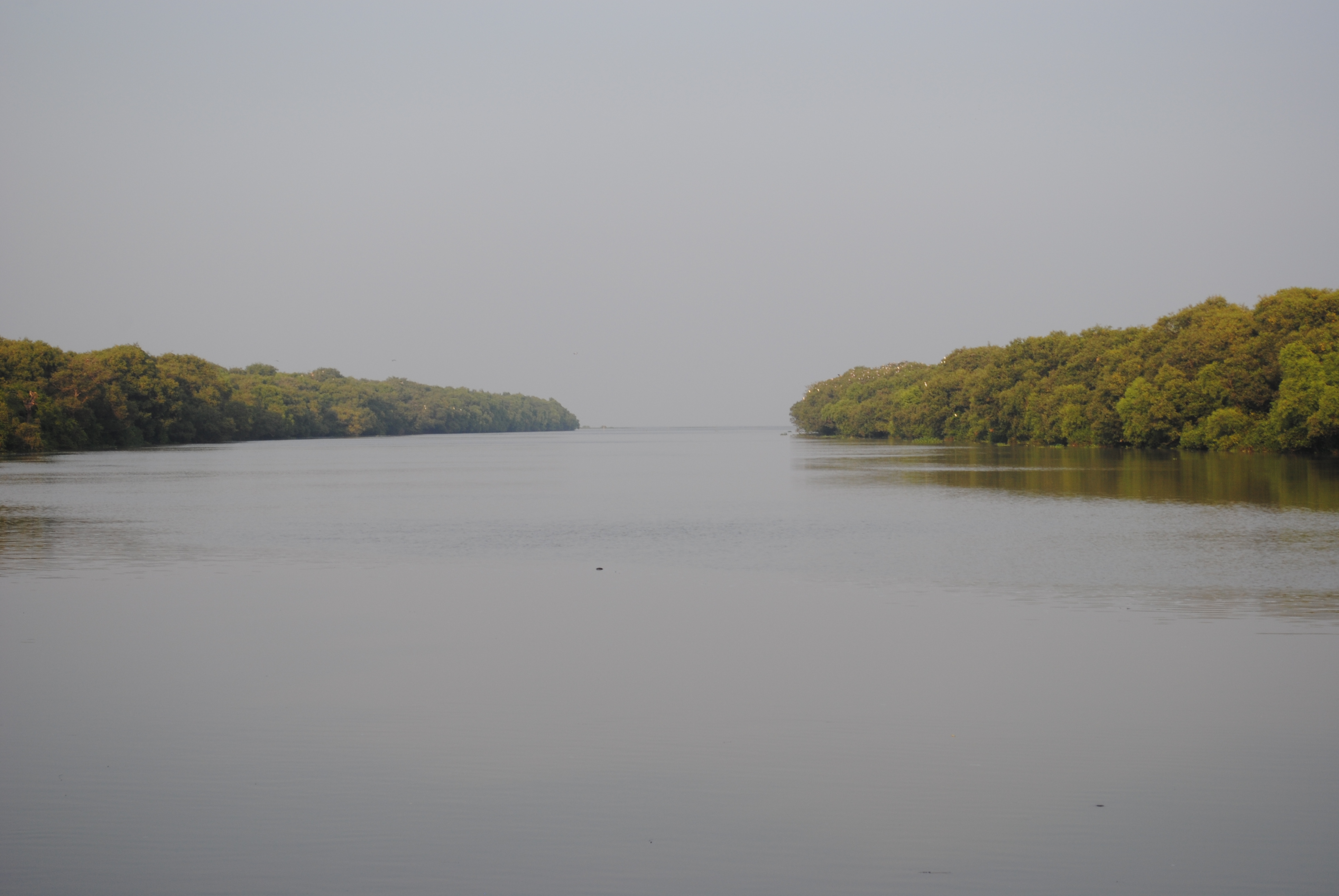
Coringa Wildlife Sanctuary, Kakinada

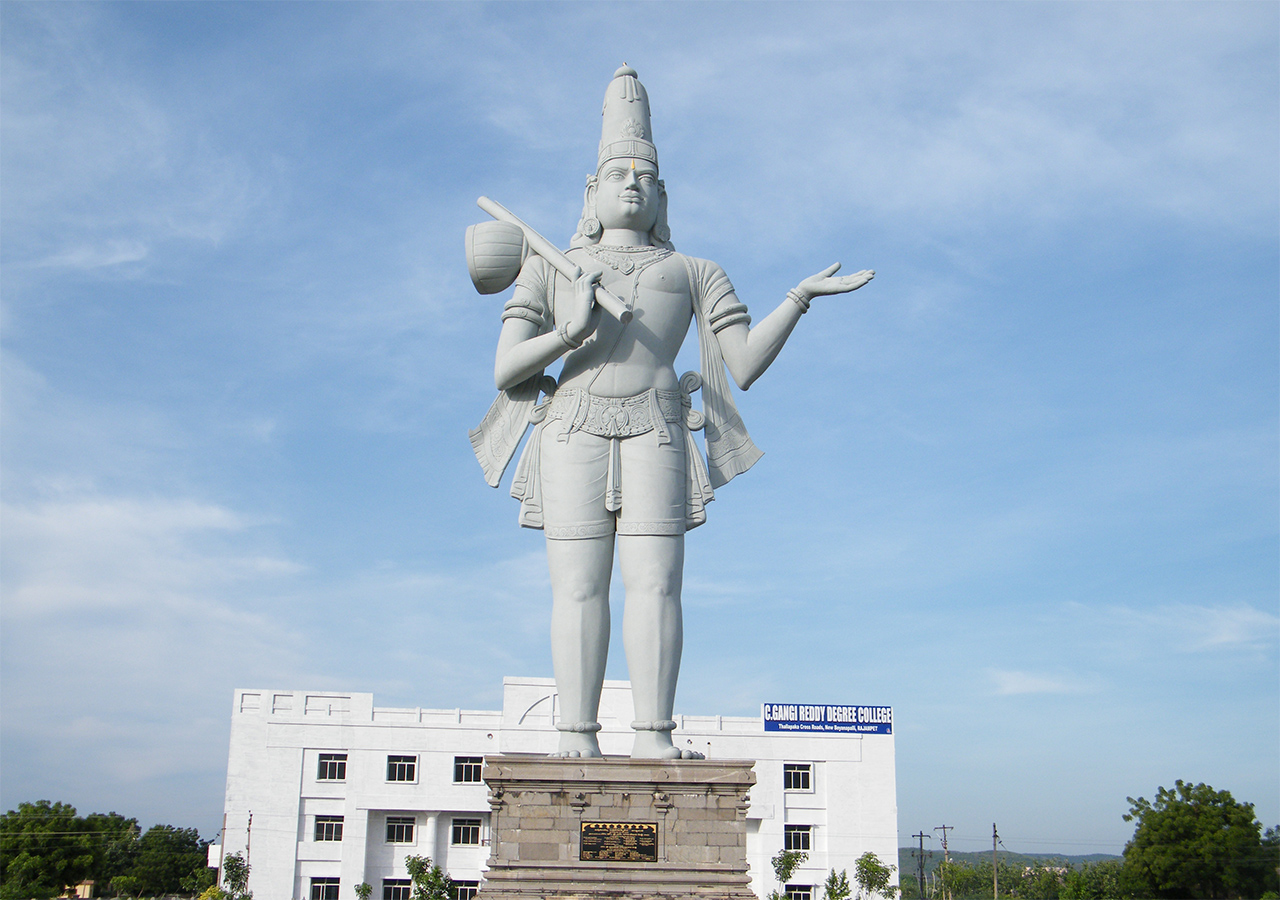
Annamacharya statue, Tallapaka, Rajampet, Kadapa

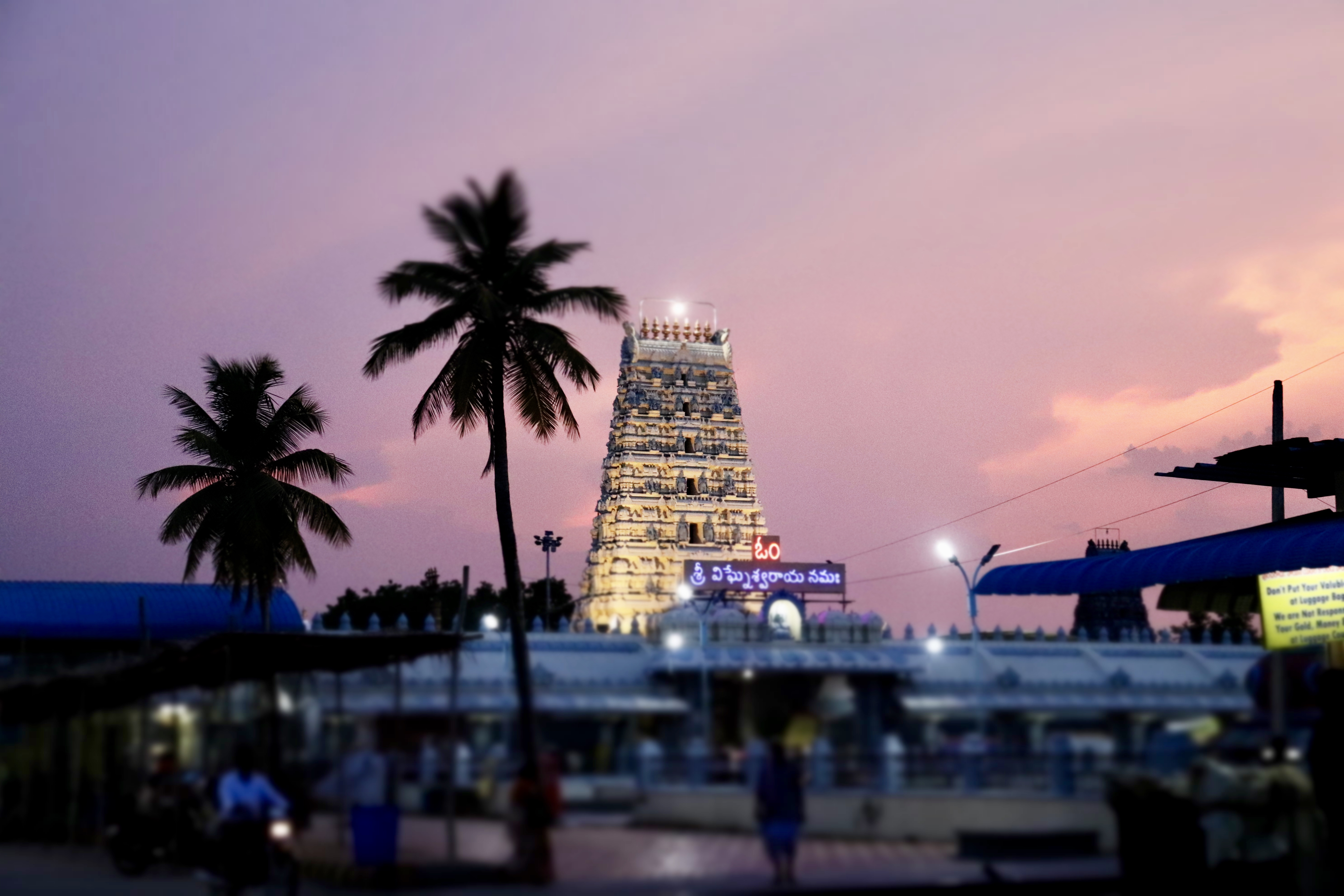
Kanipakam Temple, Kanipakam, Chittoor

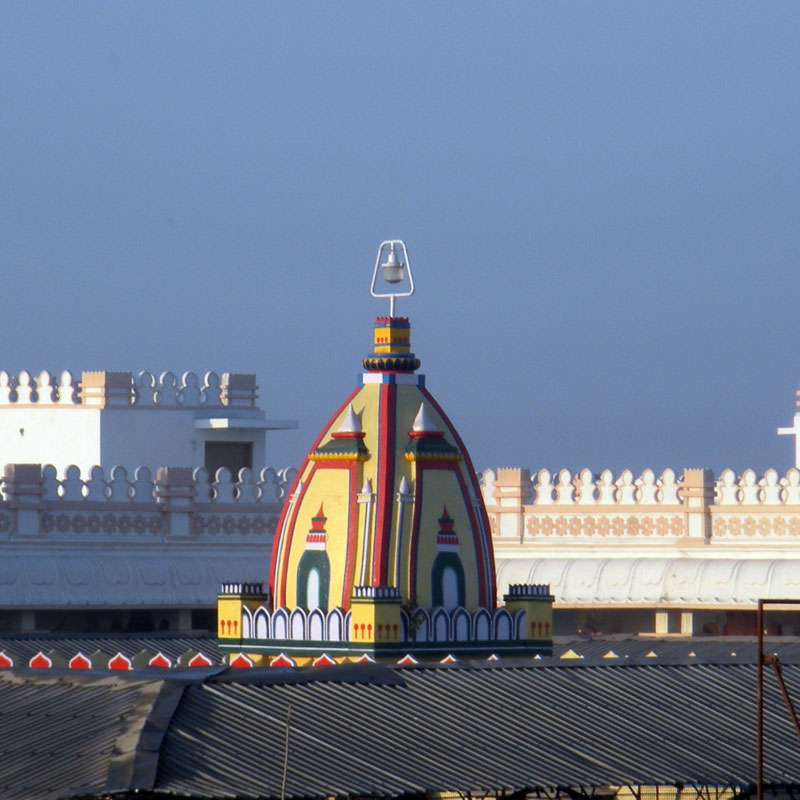
Raghavendra Swamy Temple, Mantralayam, Kurnool

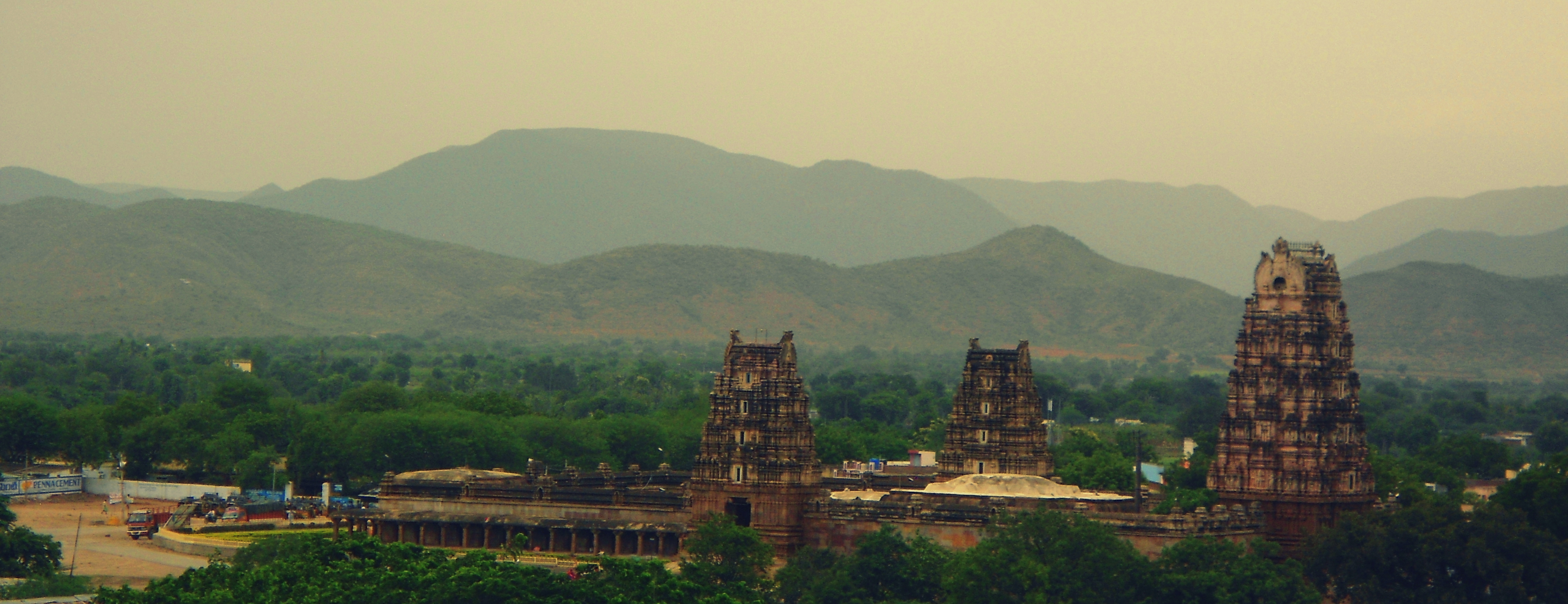
Kodanda Ramaswamy Temple, Vontimitta, Kadapa

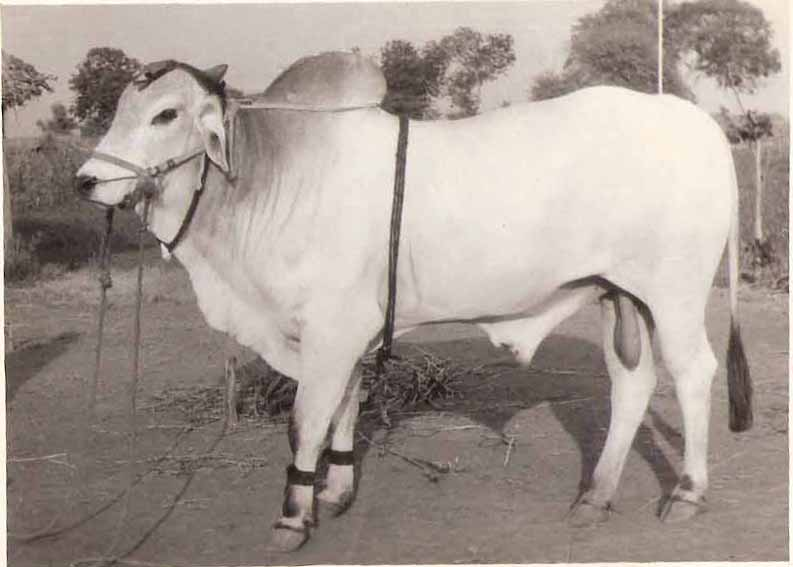
Ongole Bull

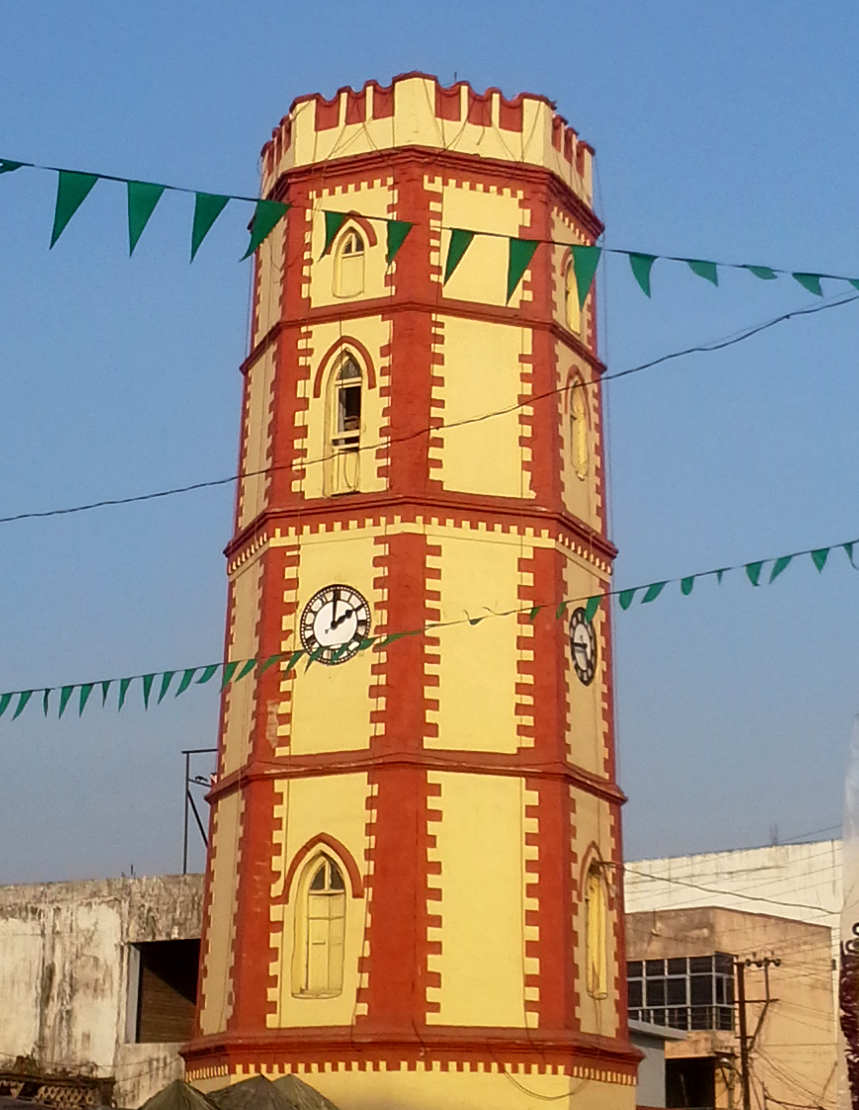
Ganta Stambham [Clock Tower], Vizianagaram

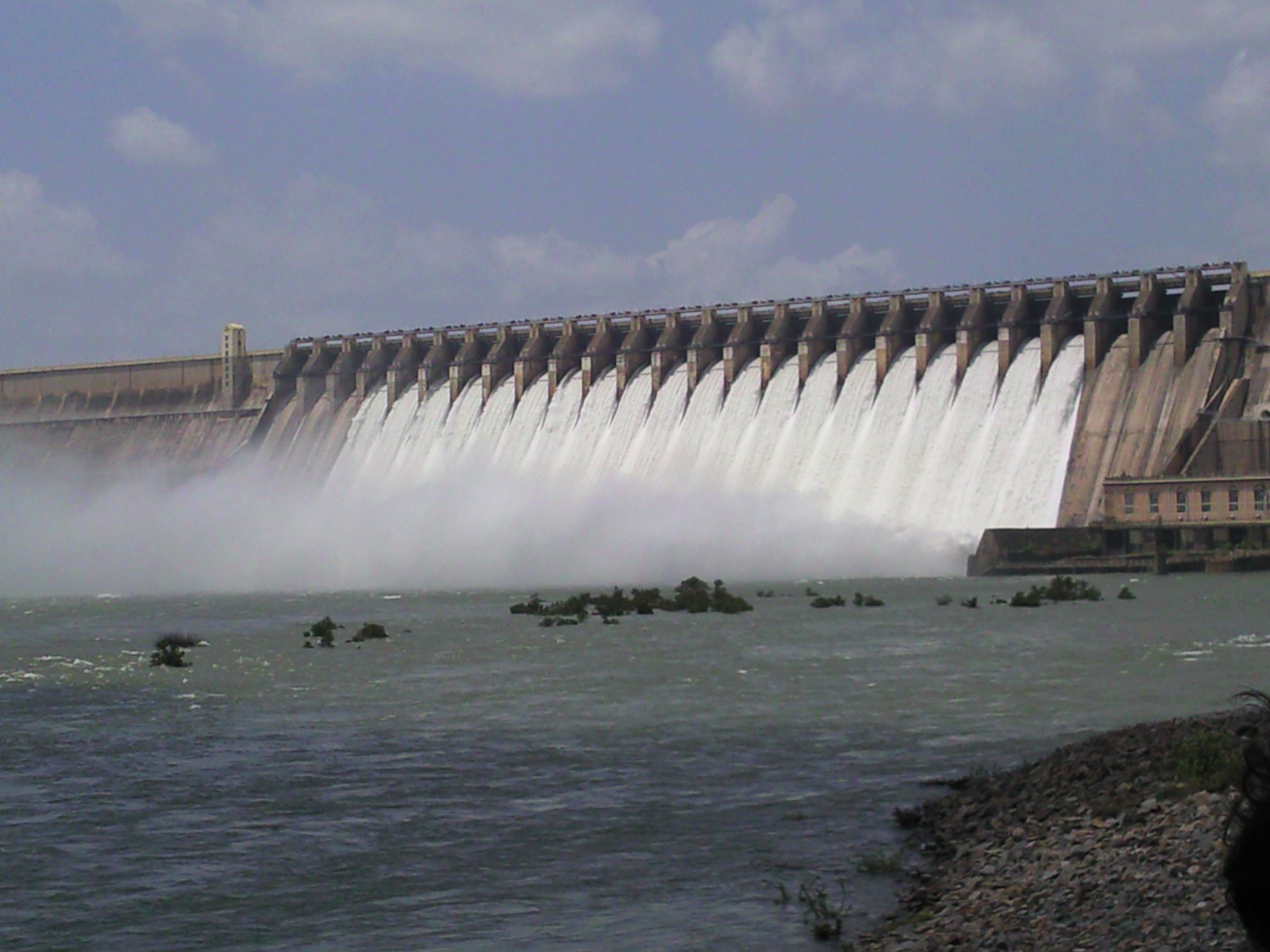
Nagarjuna Sagar

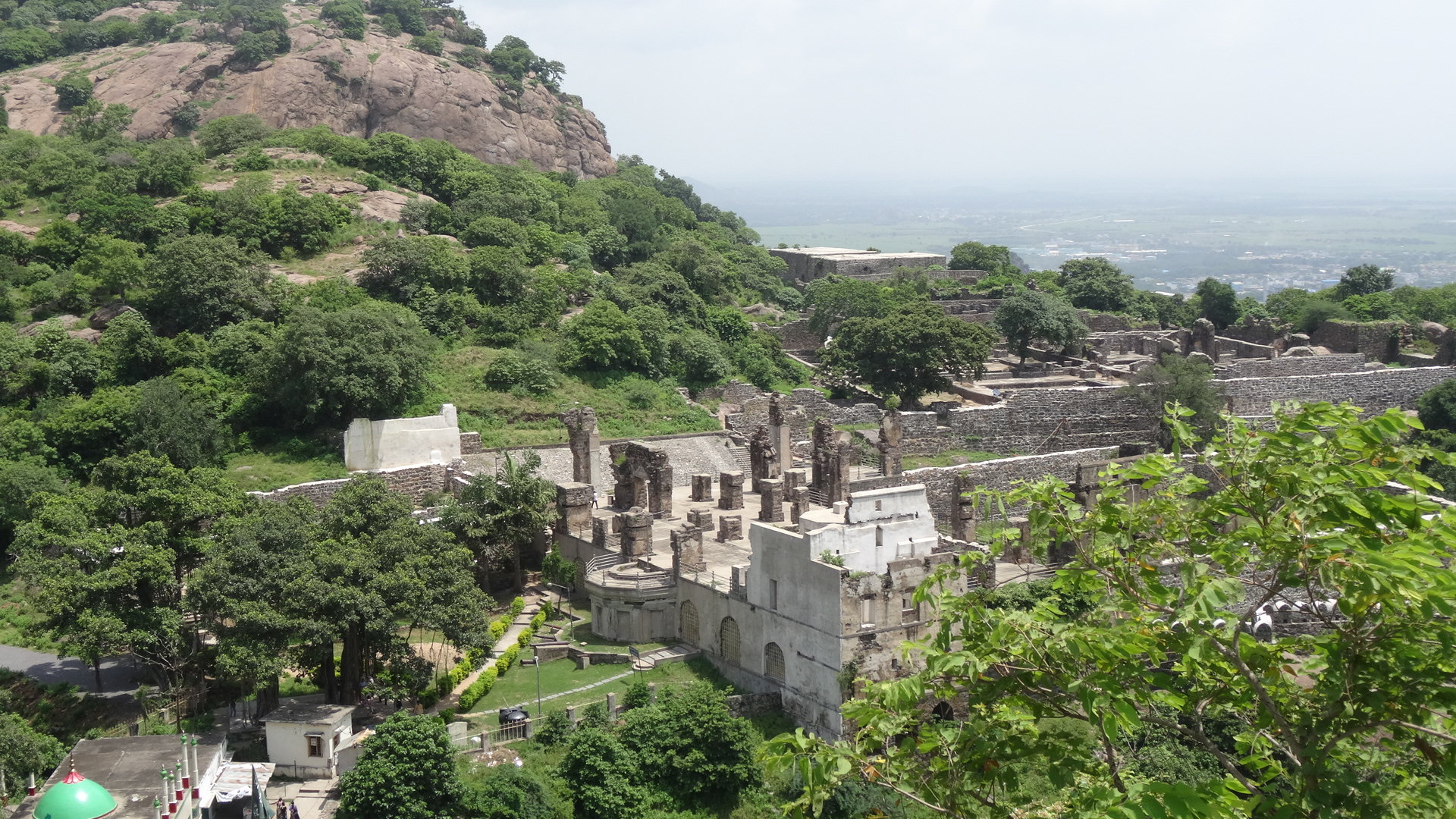
Kondapalli Fort, Vijayawada

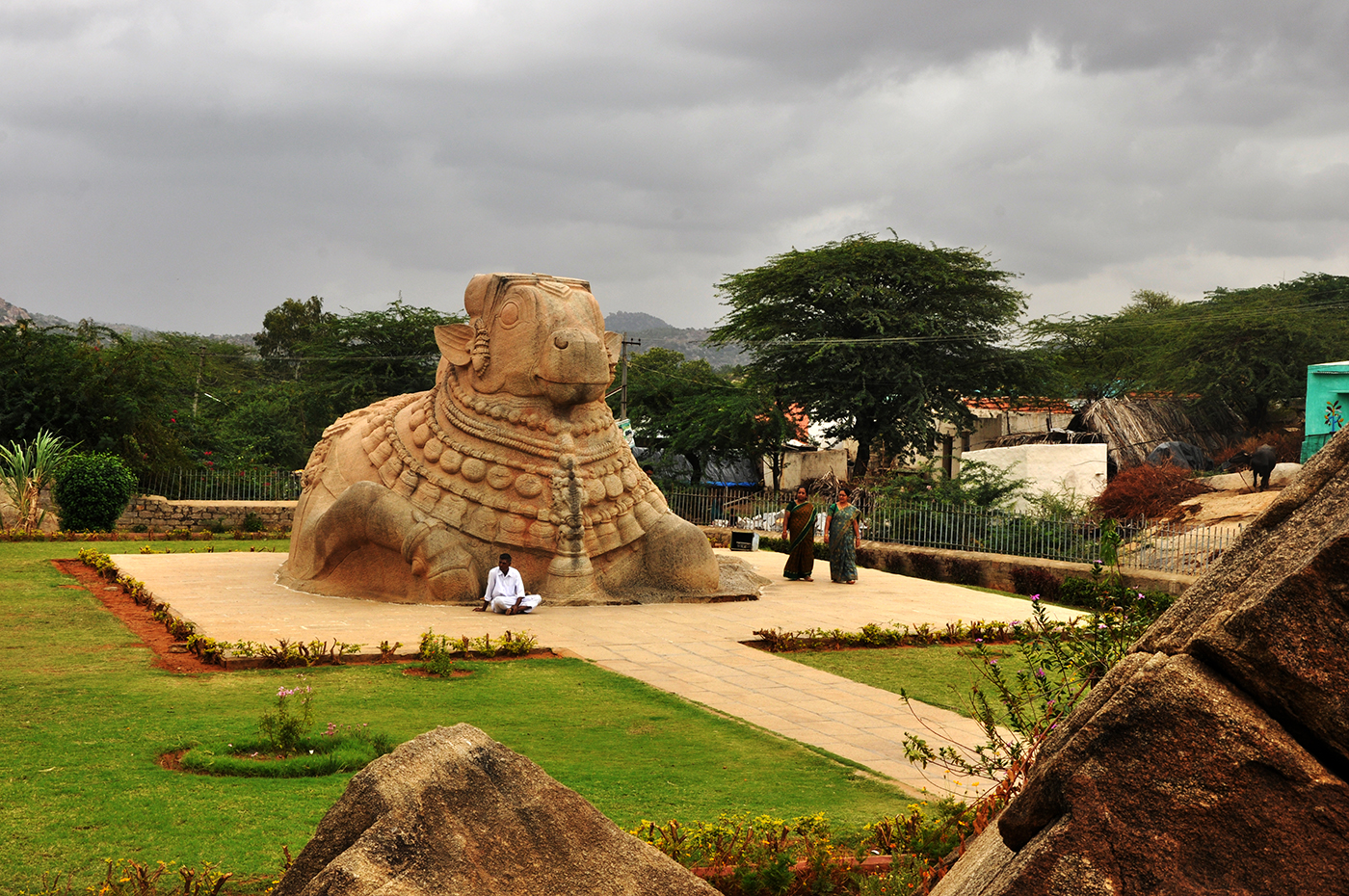
Lepakshi, Hindupuram, Sri Sathya Sai district

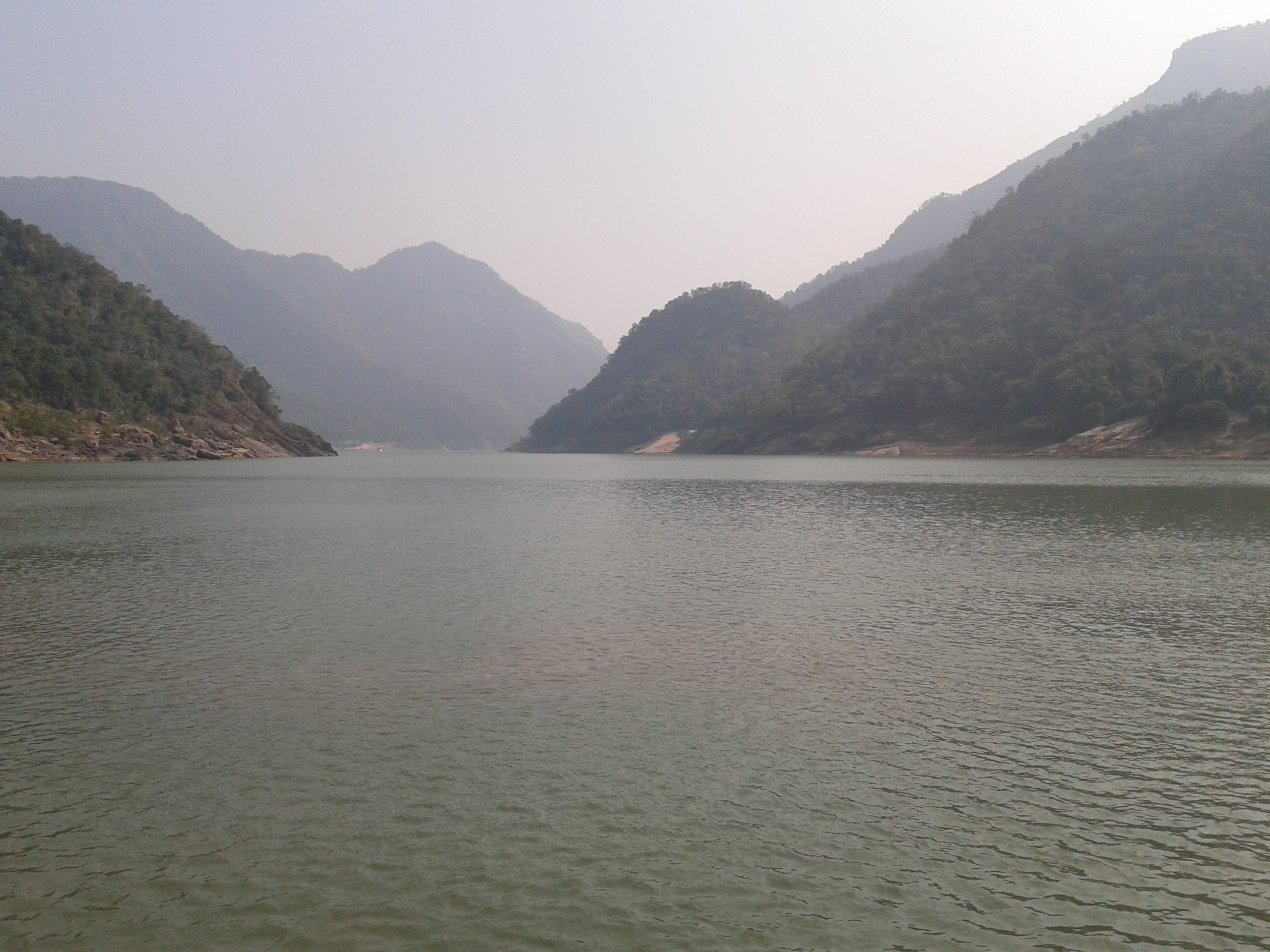
Papikondalu, Godavari River

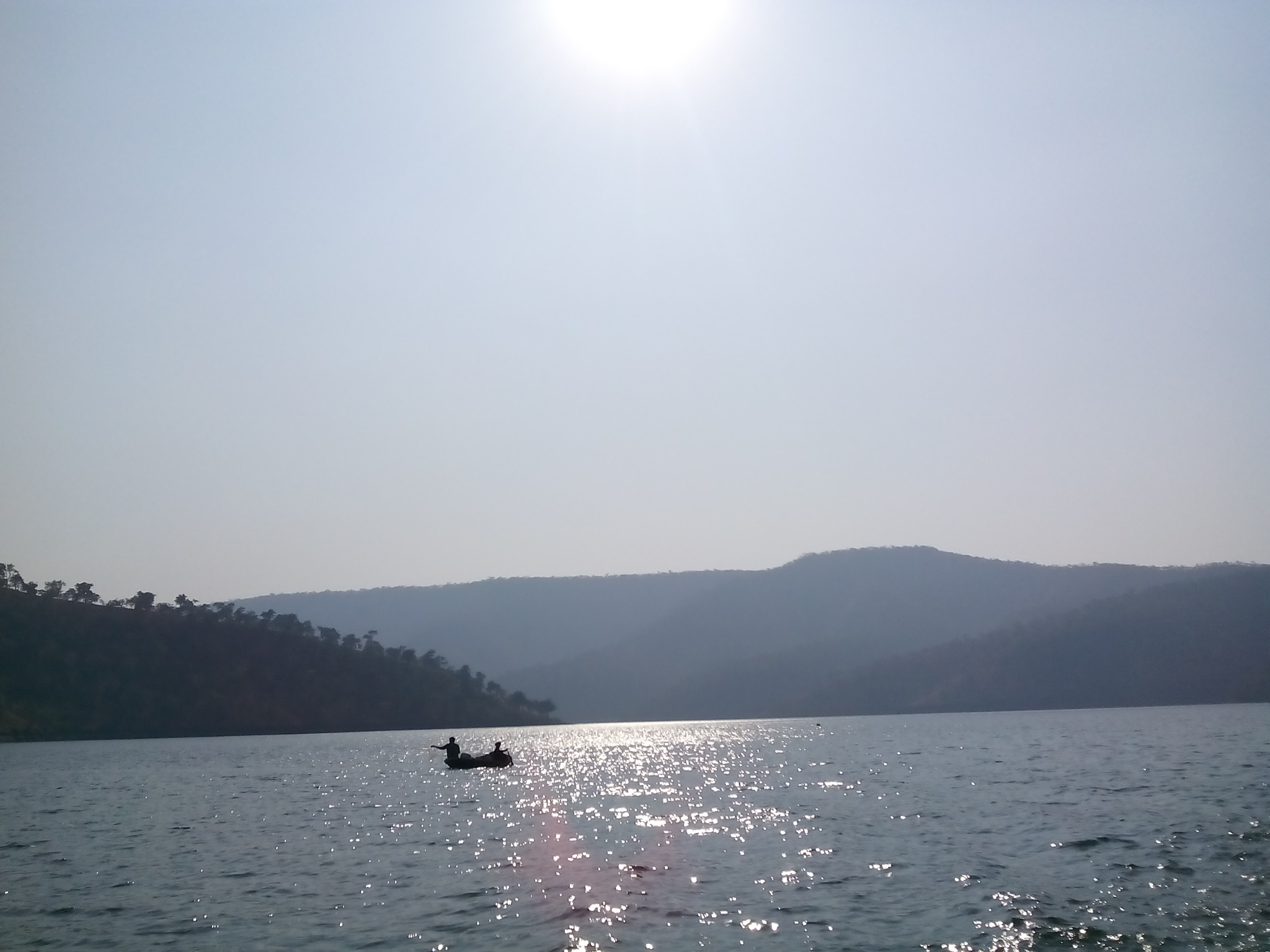
Nallamalla Forest, Srisailam, Nandyal

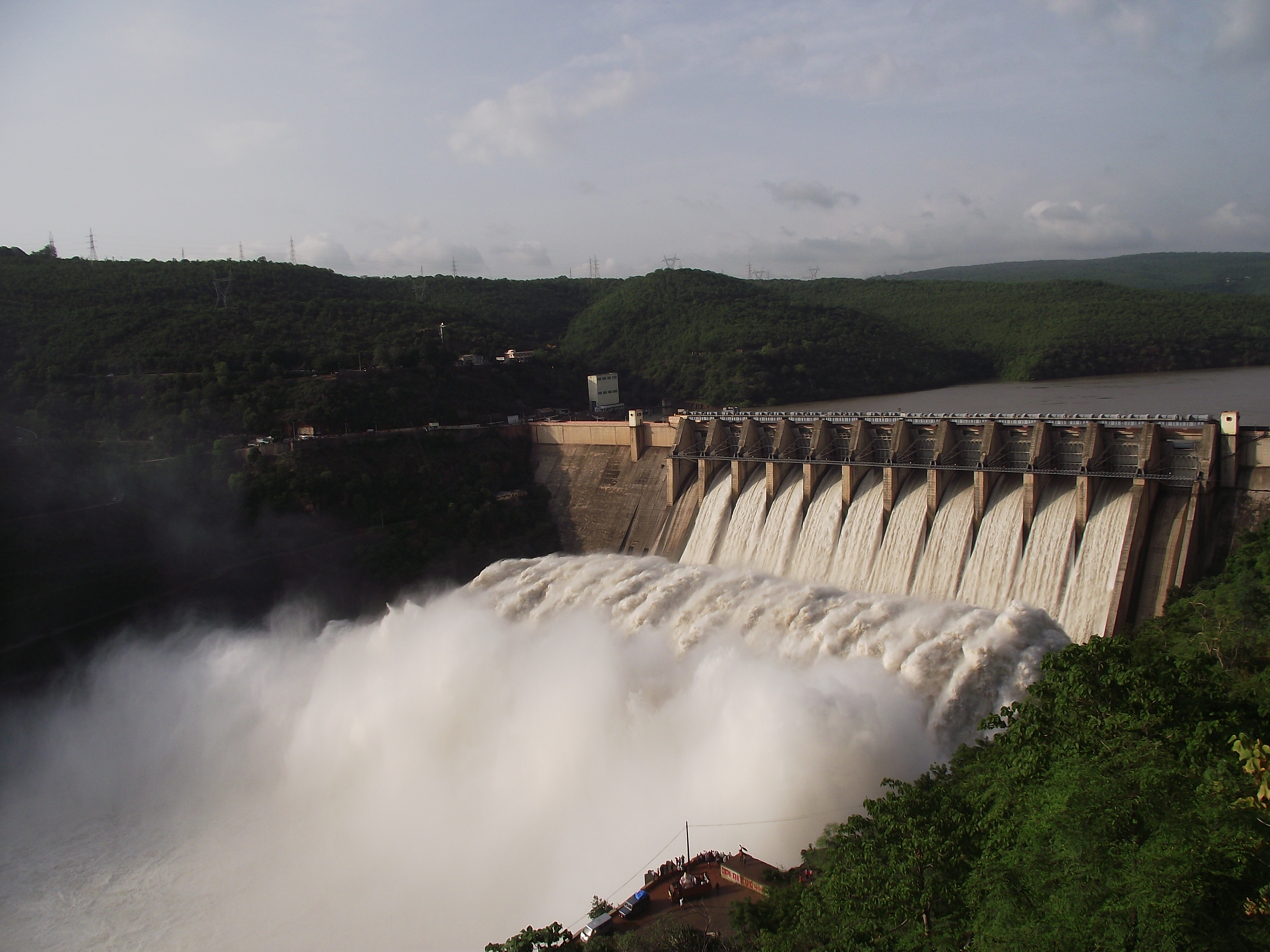
Srisailam Dam, Nandyal

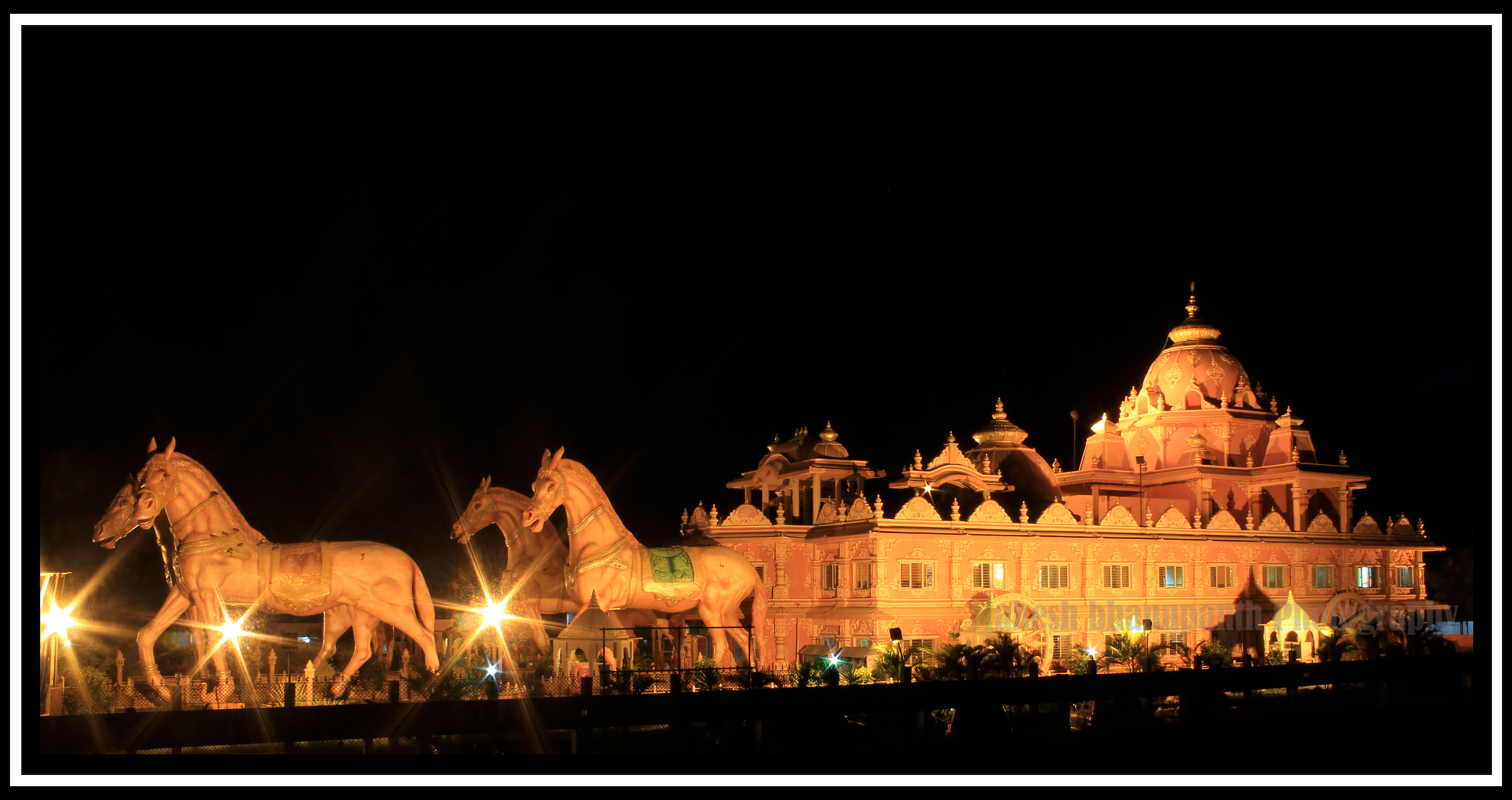
ISKON Temple, Anantapuram

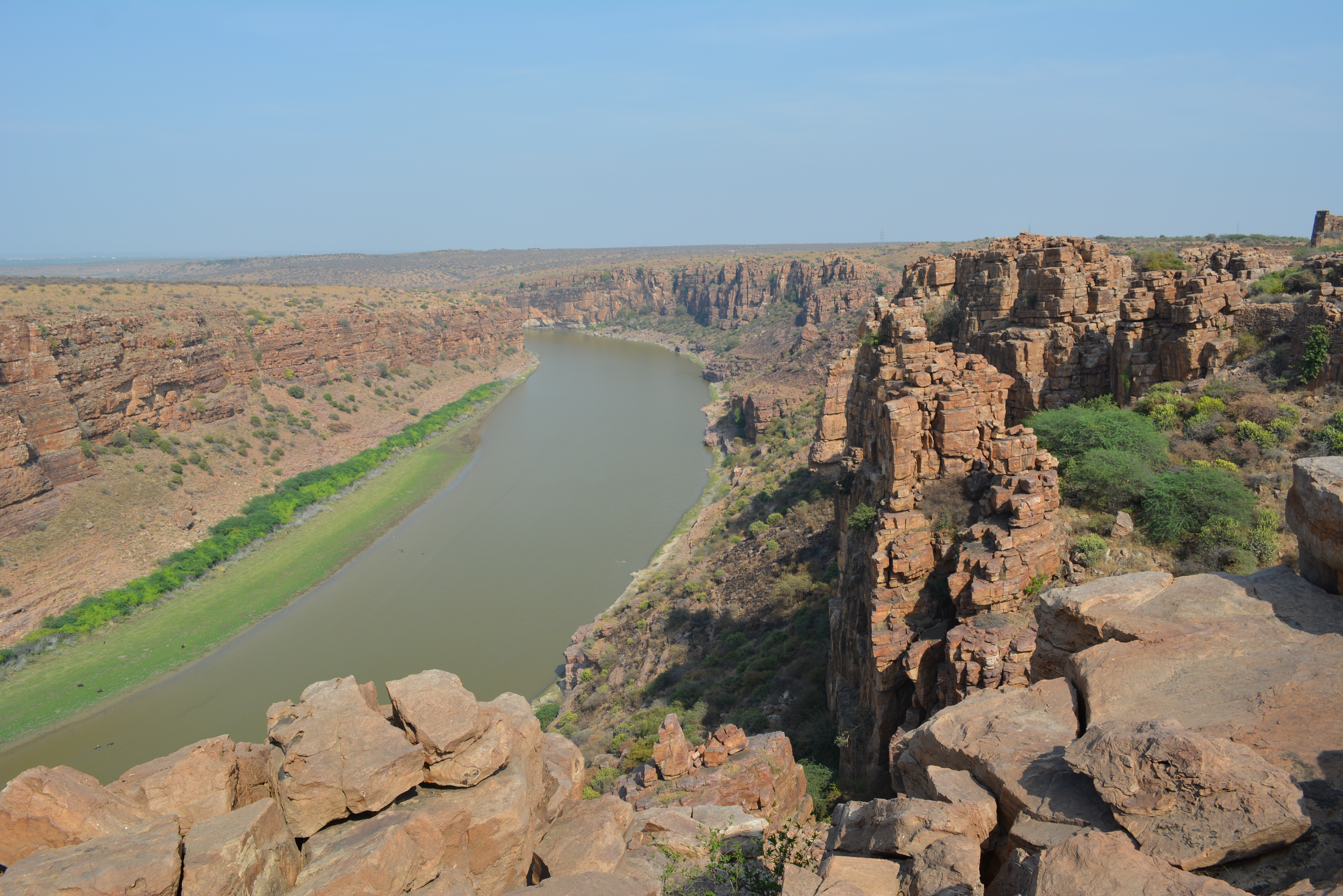
Grand Canyon of India, Chitravathi River, Gandikota, Kadapa

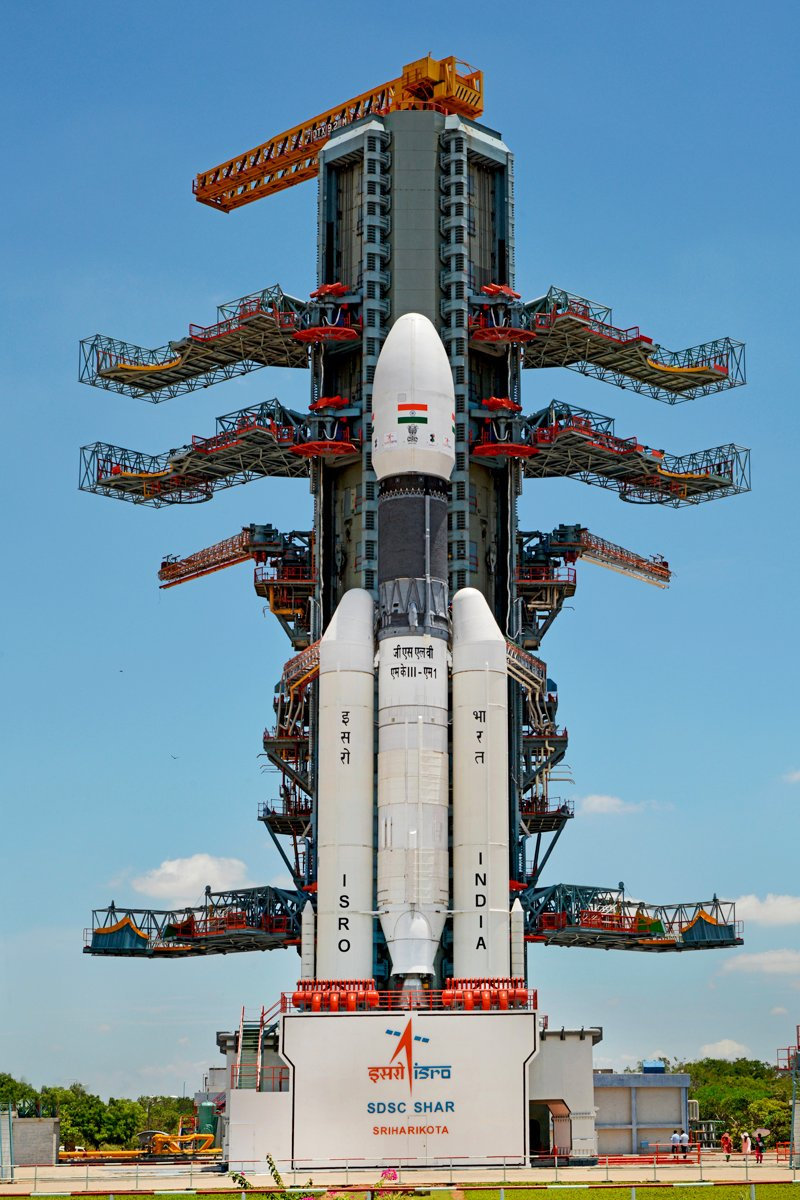
Satish Dhawan Space Centre [SDSC], Sriharikota, Tirupati

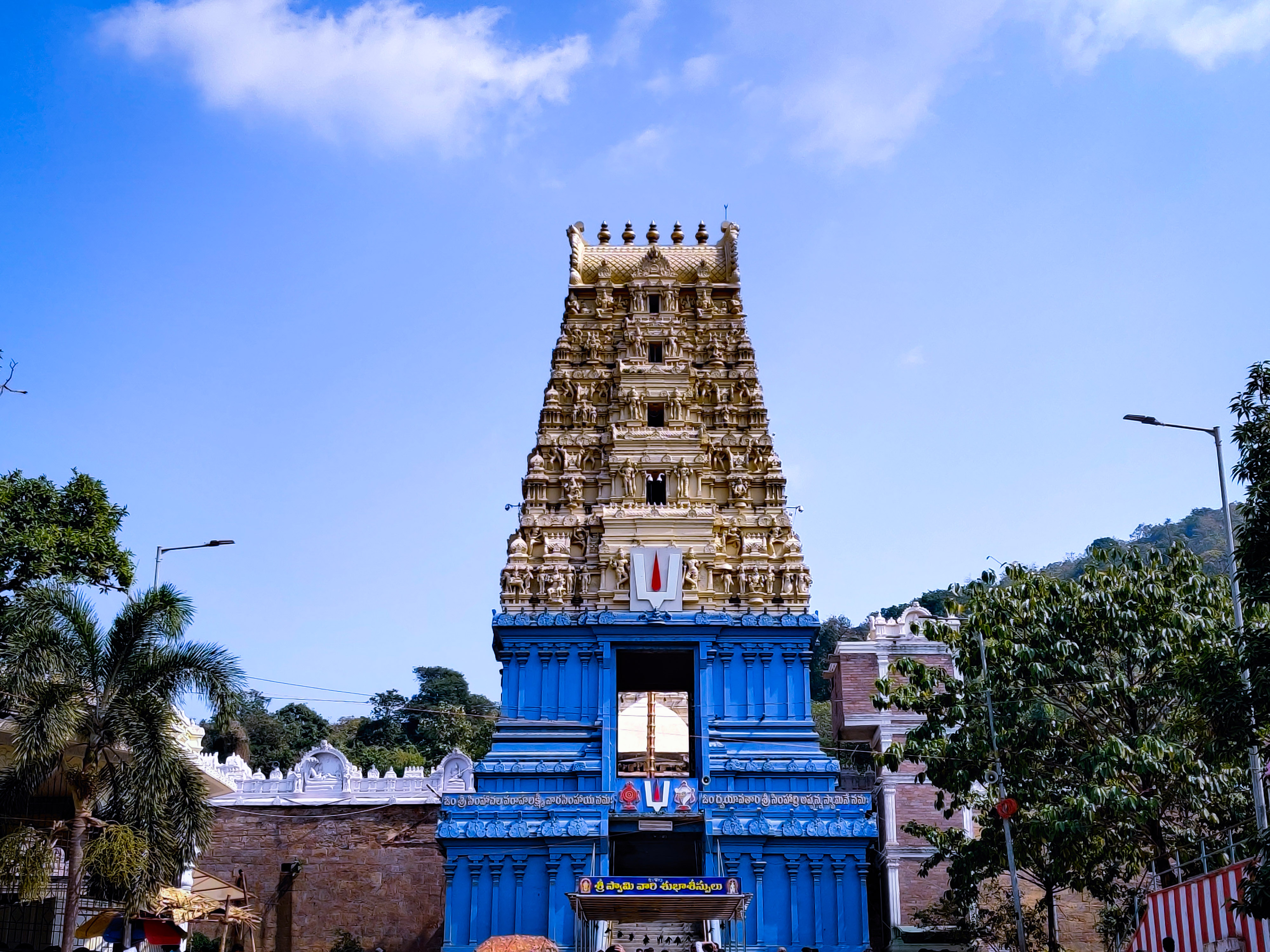
Varaha Lakshmi Narasimha swamy Temple, Simhachalam, Visakhapatnam

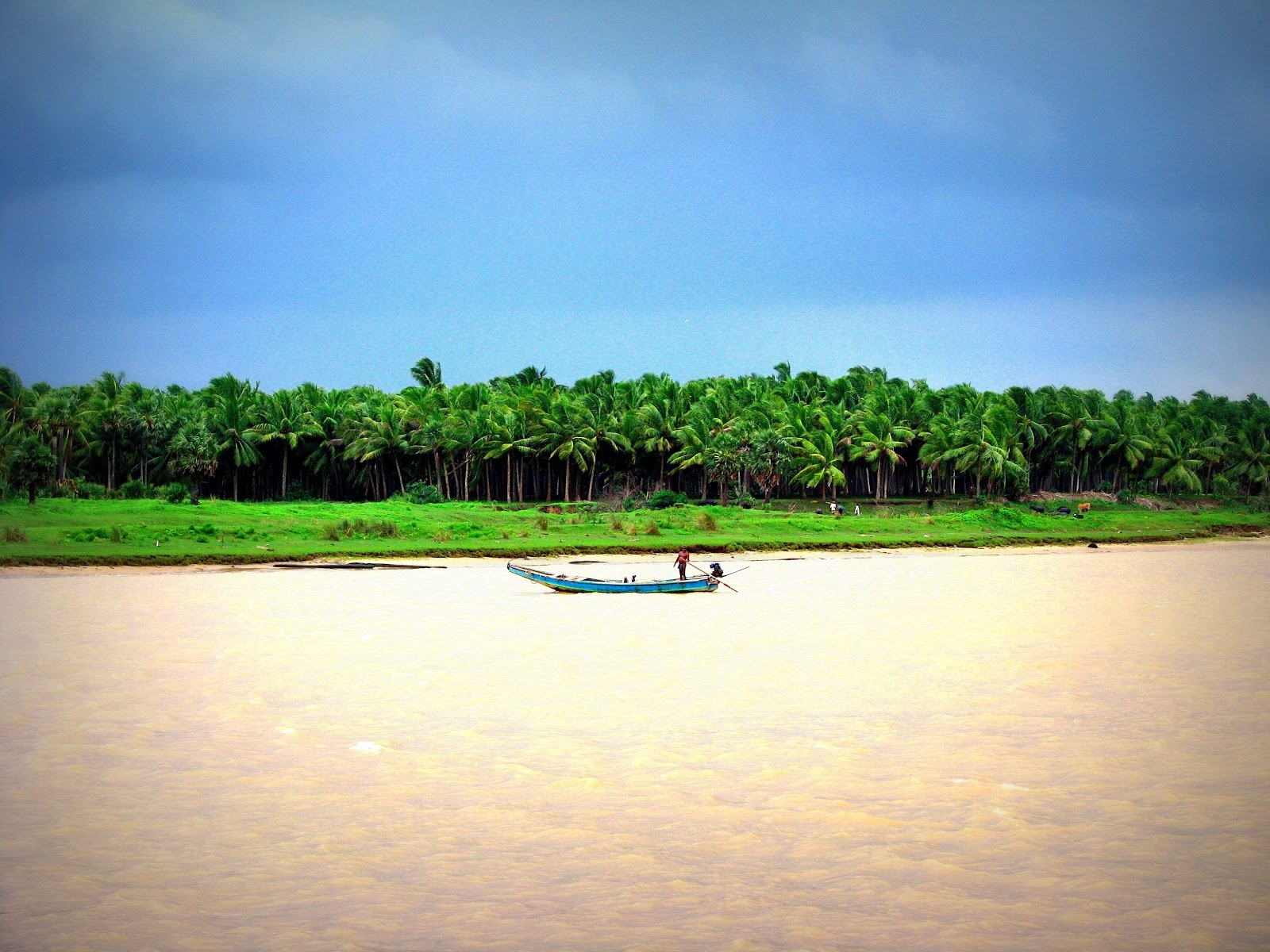
Konaseema, Amalapuram

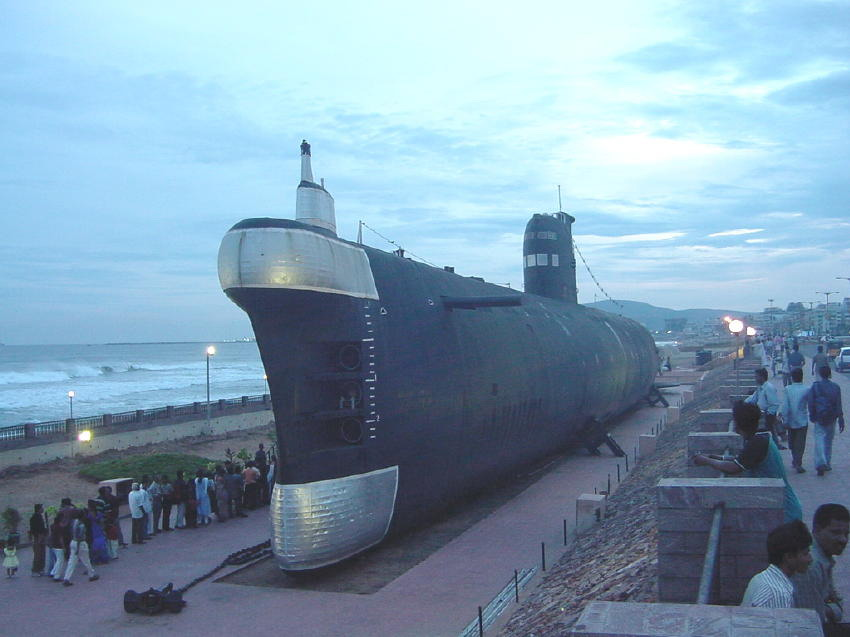
INS Kursura Submarine Museum, Visakhapatnam

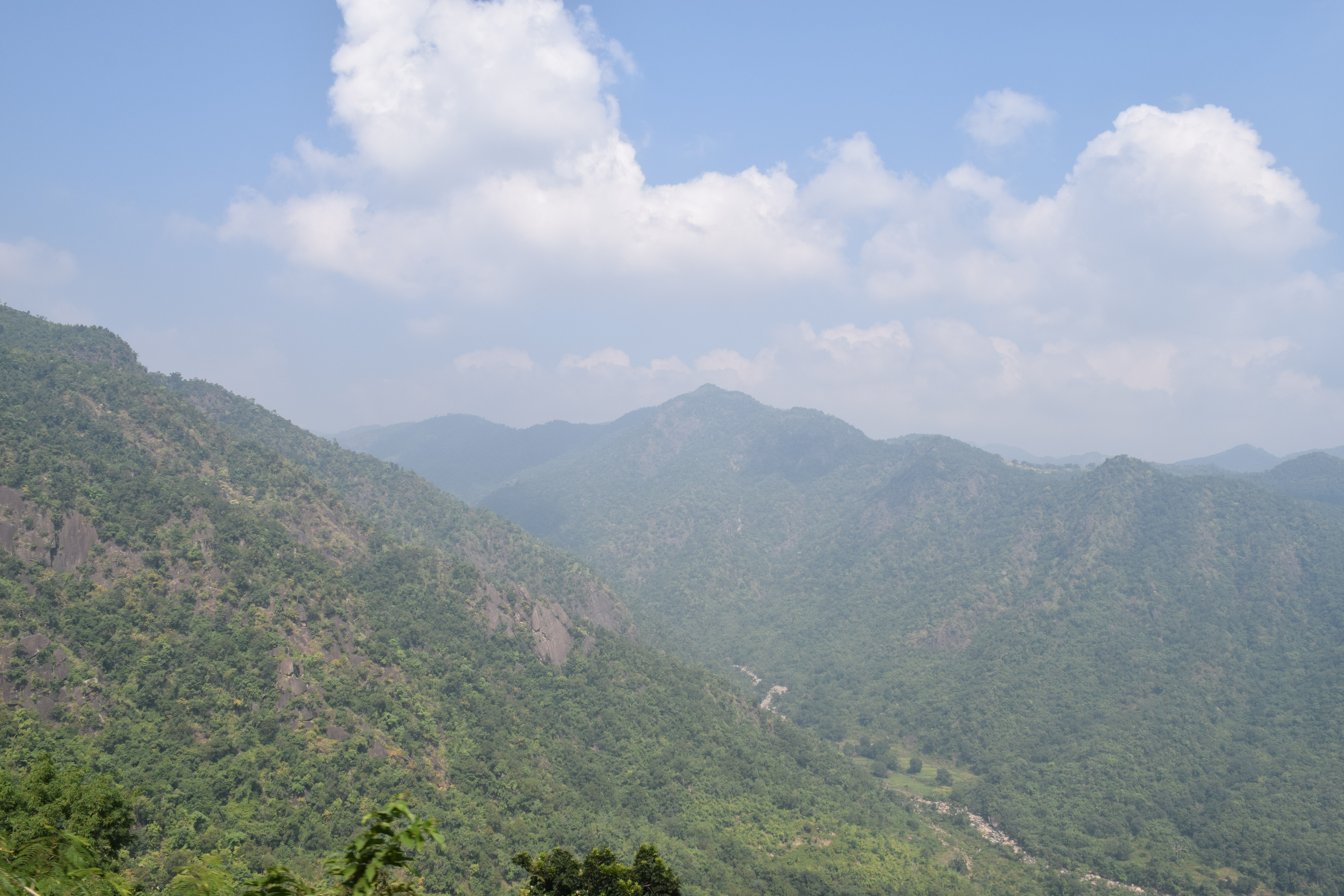
Araku Valley, Araku

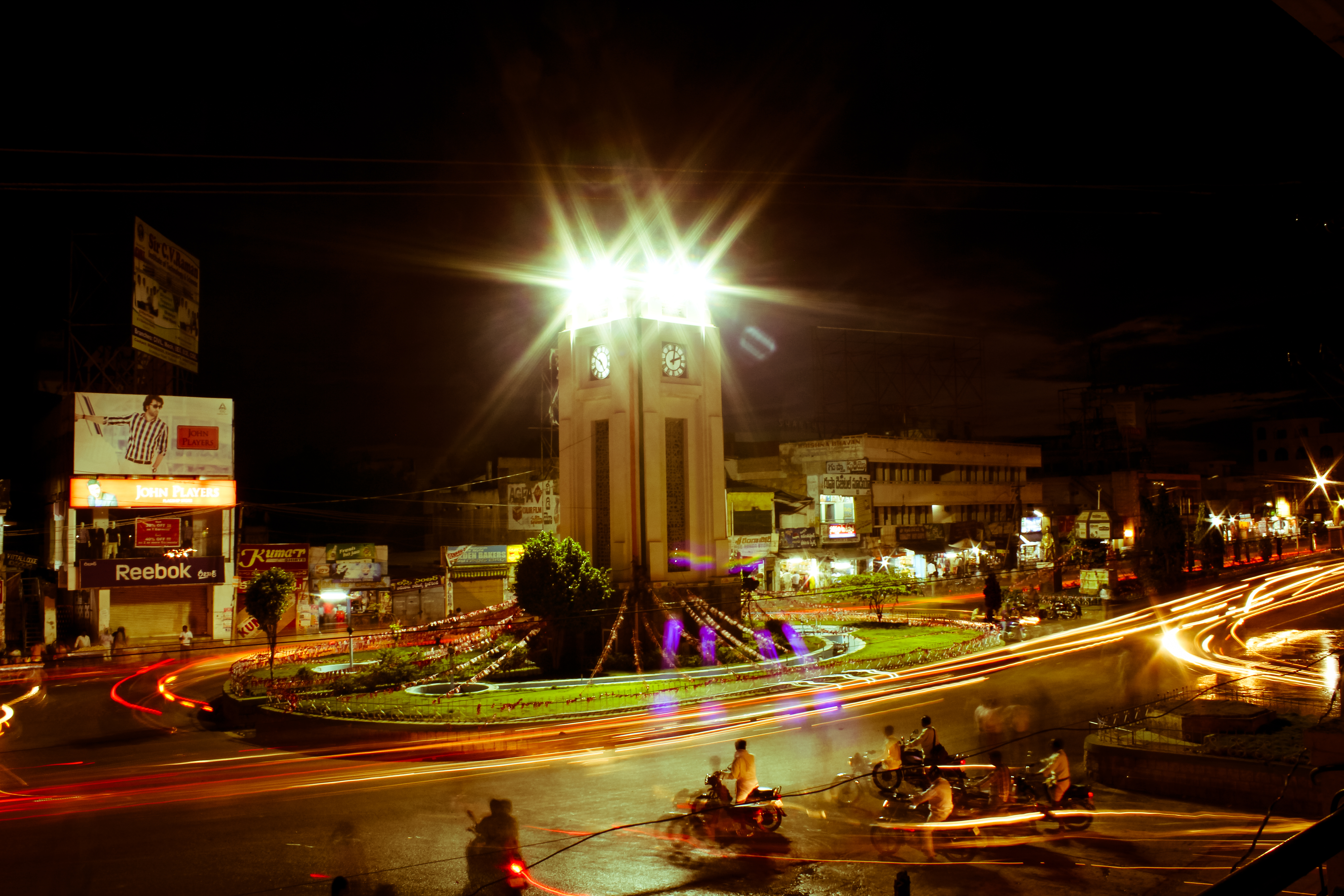
Clock Tower, Anantapuram

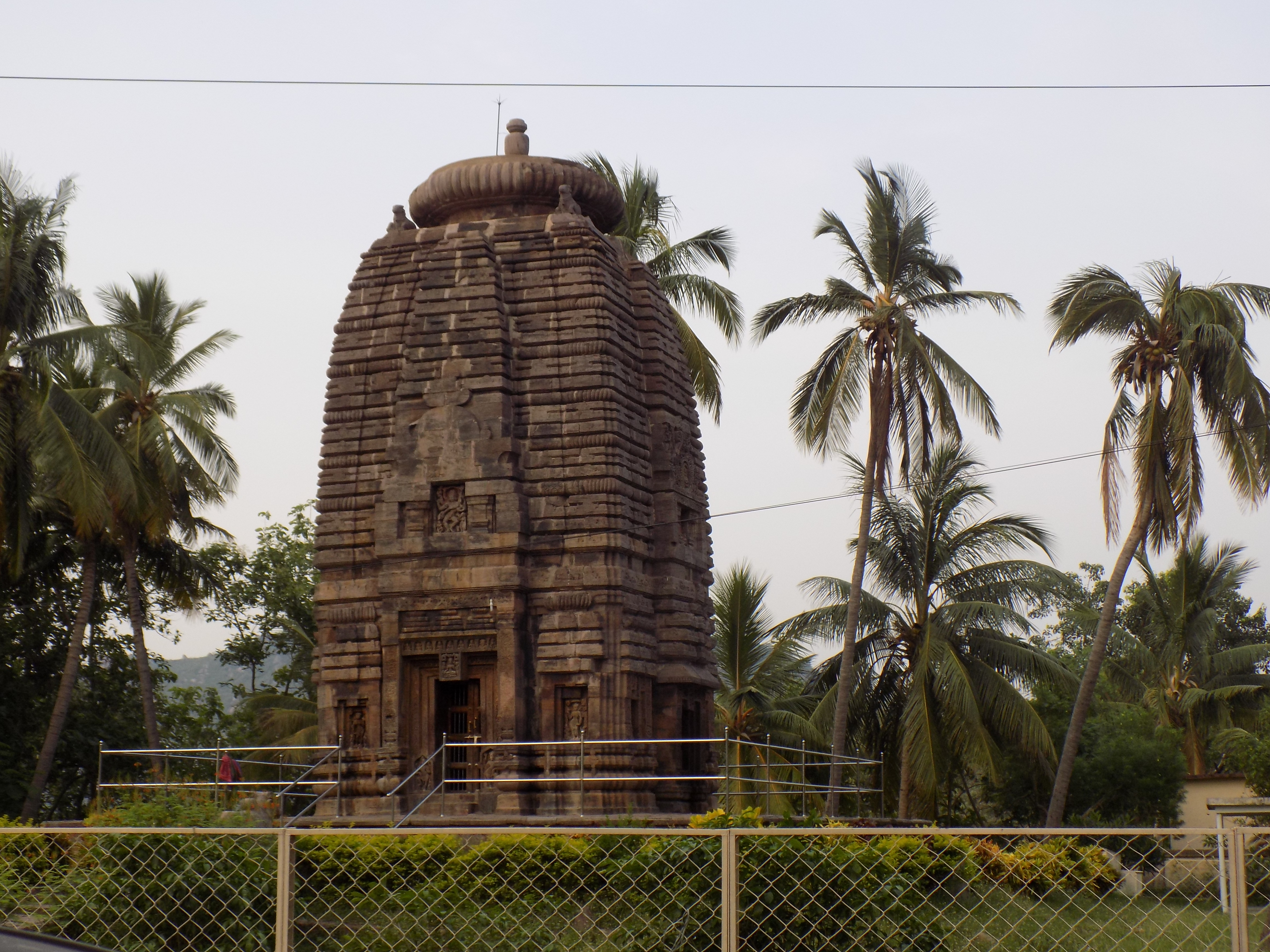
Sri Mukhalingam Temple, Srikakulam

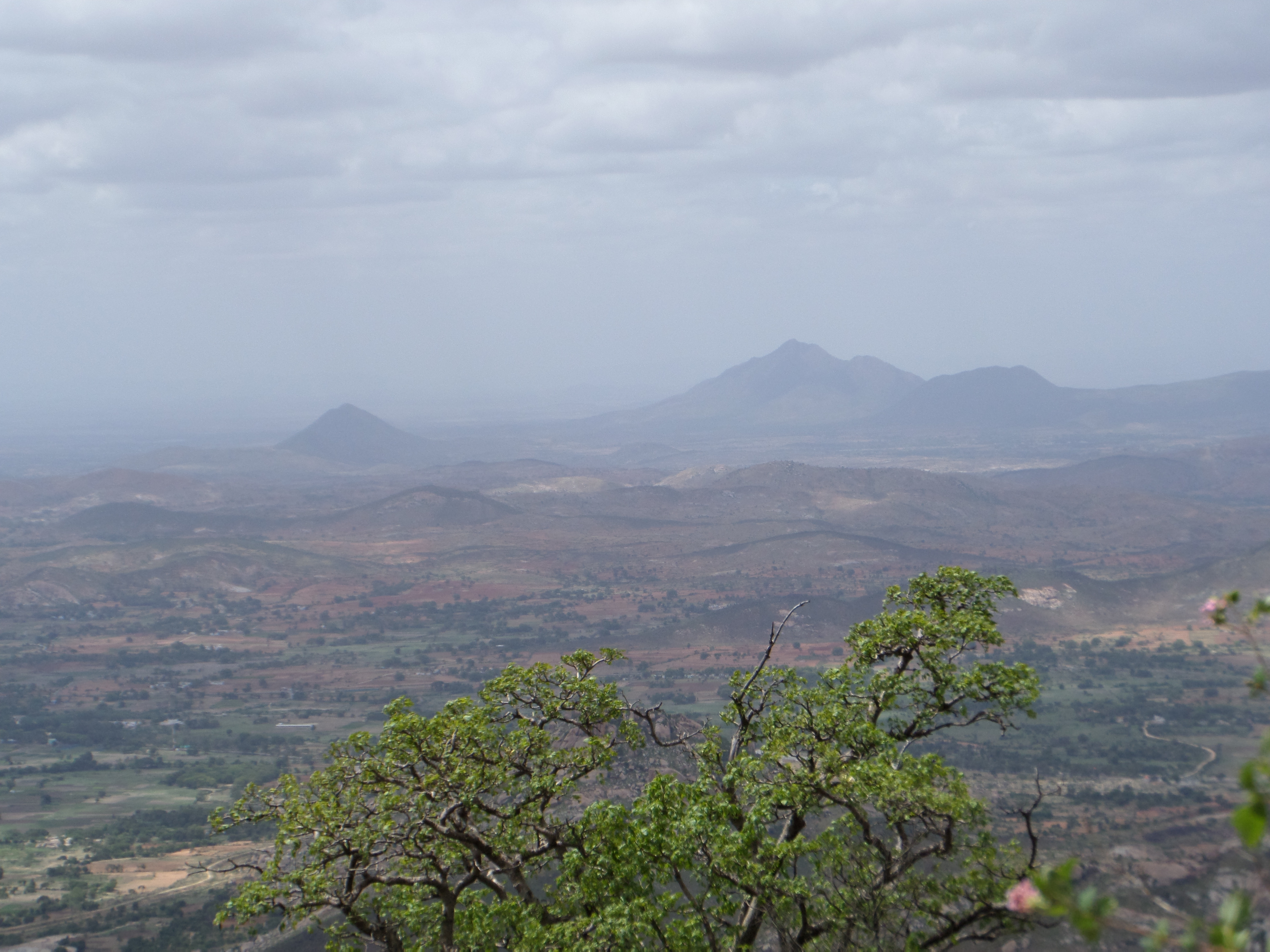
Horsley hills, Madanapalli, Annamayya district

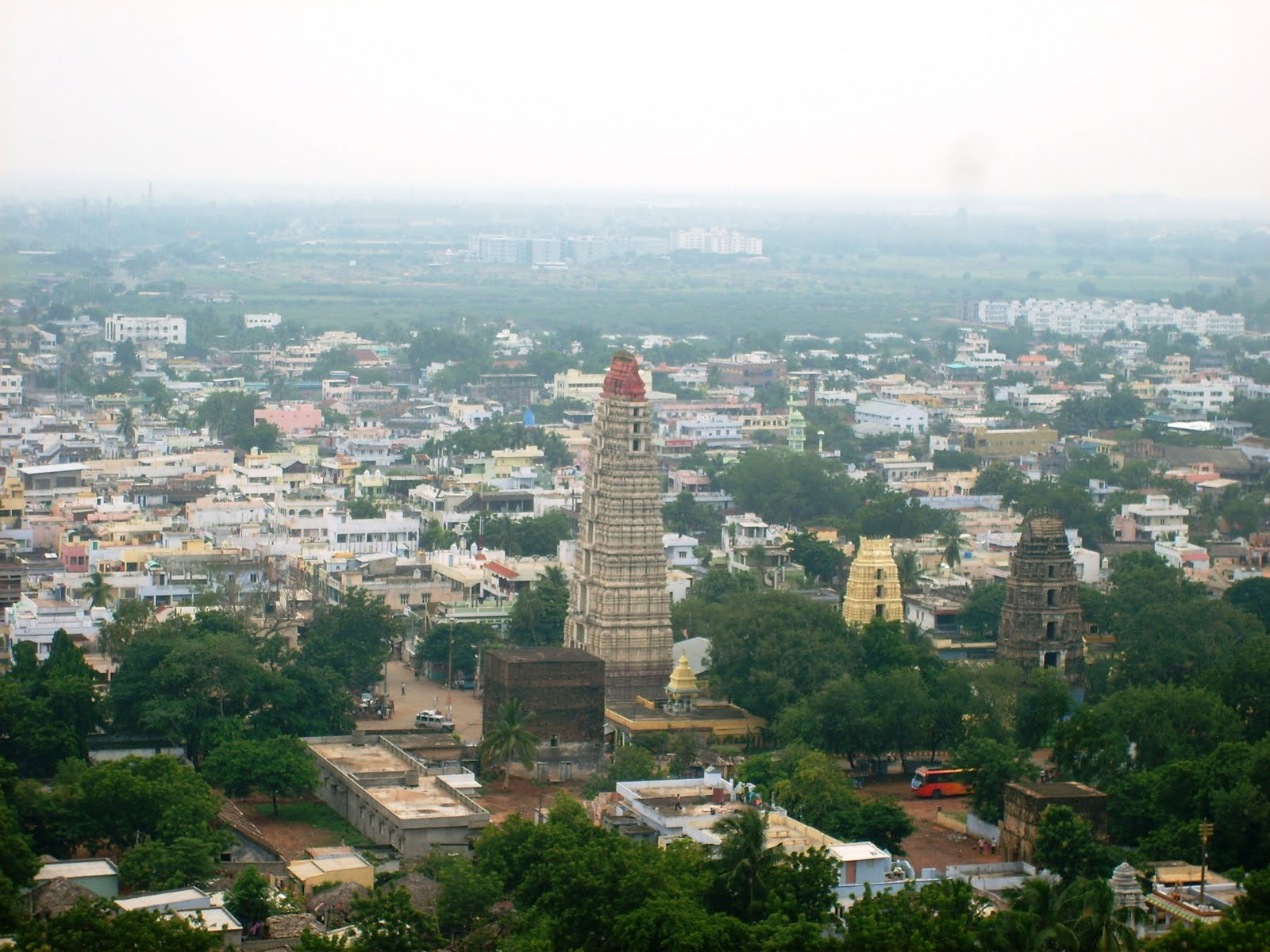
Panakala Lakshmi Narasimha swamy Temple, Mangalagiri, Guntur

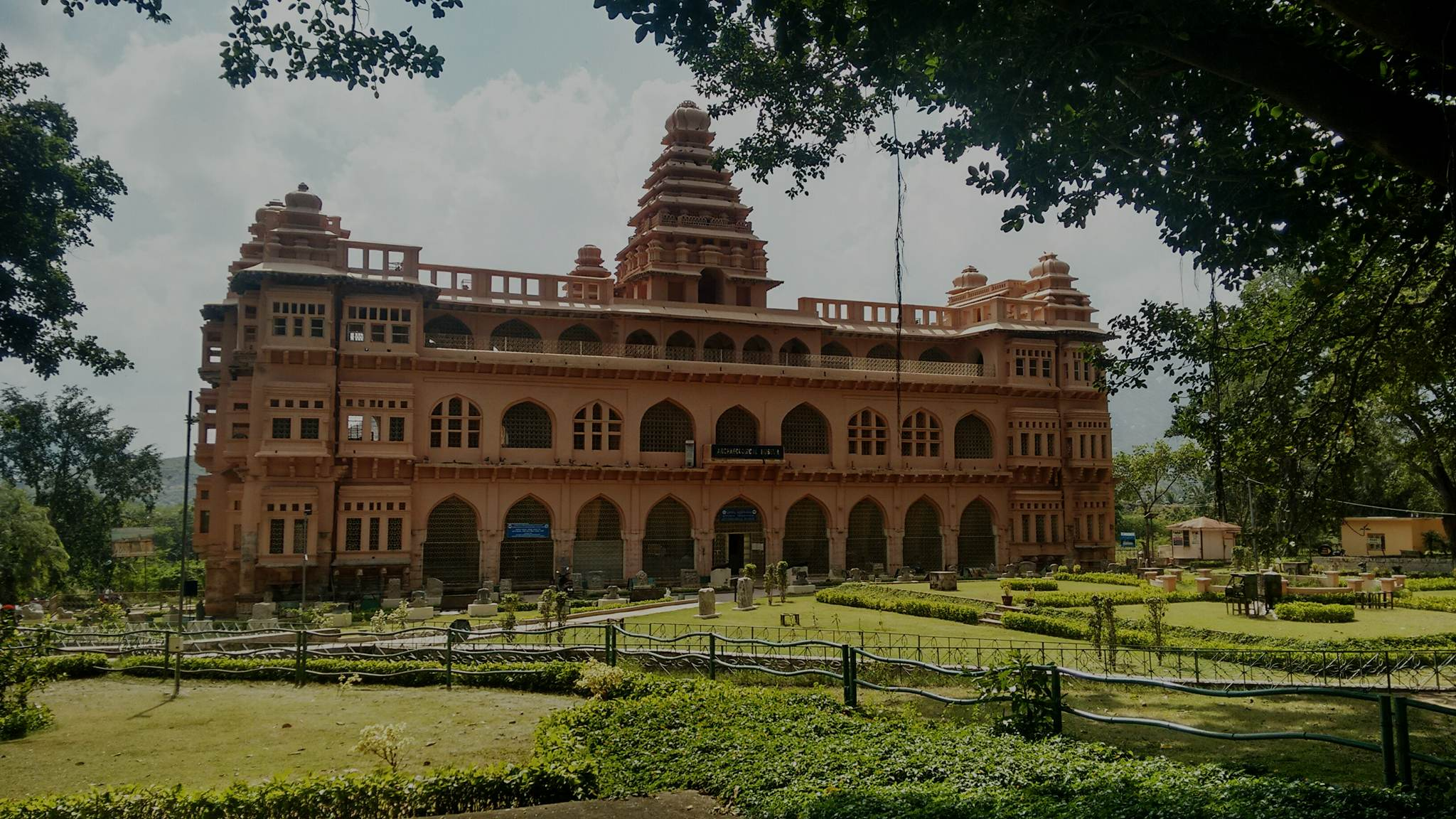
Chandragiri Fort, Chandragiri, Tirupati

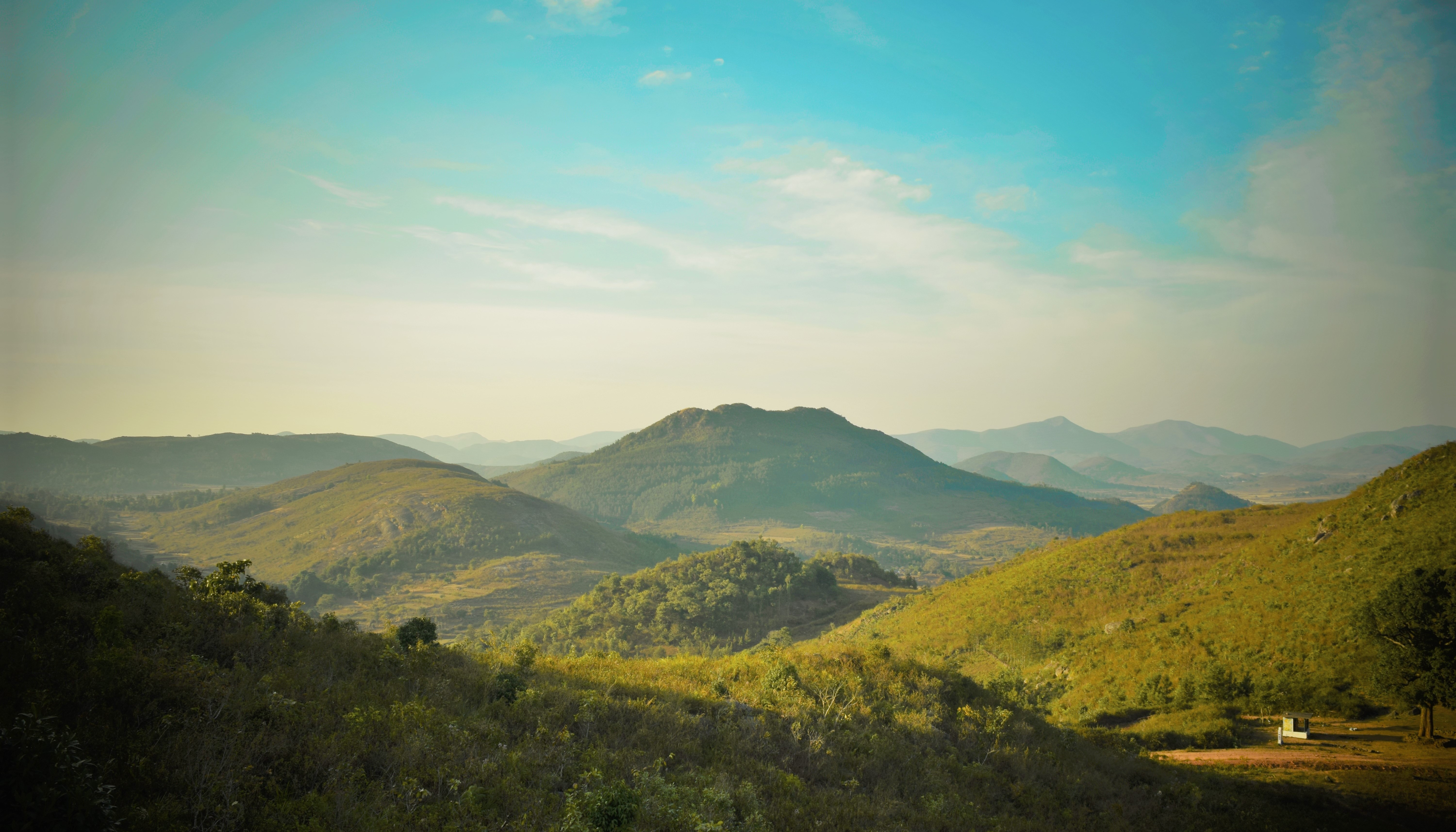
Paderu Agency Area, Visakhapatnam

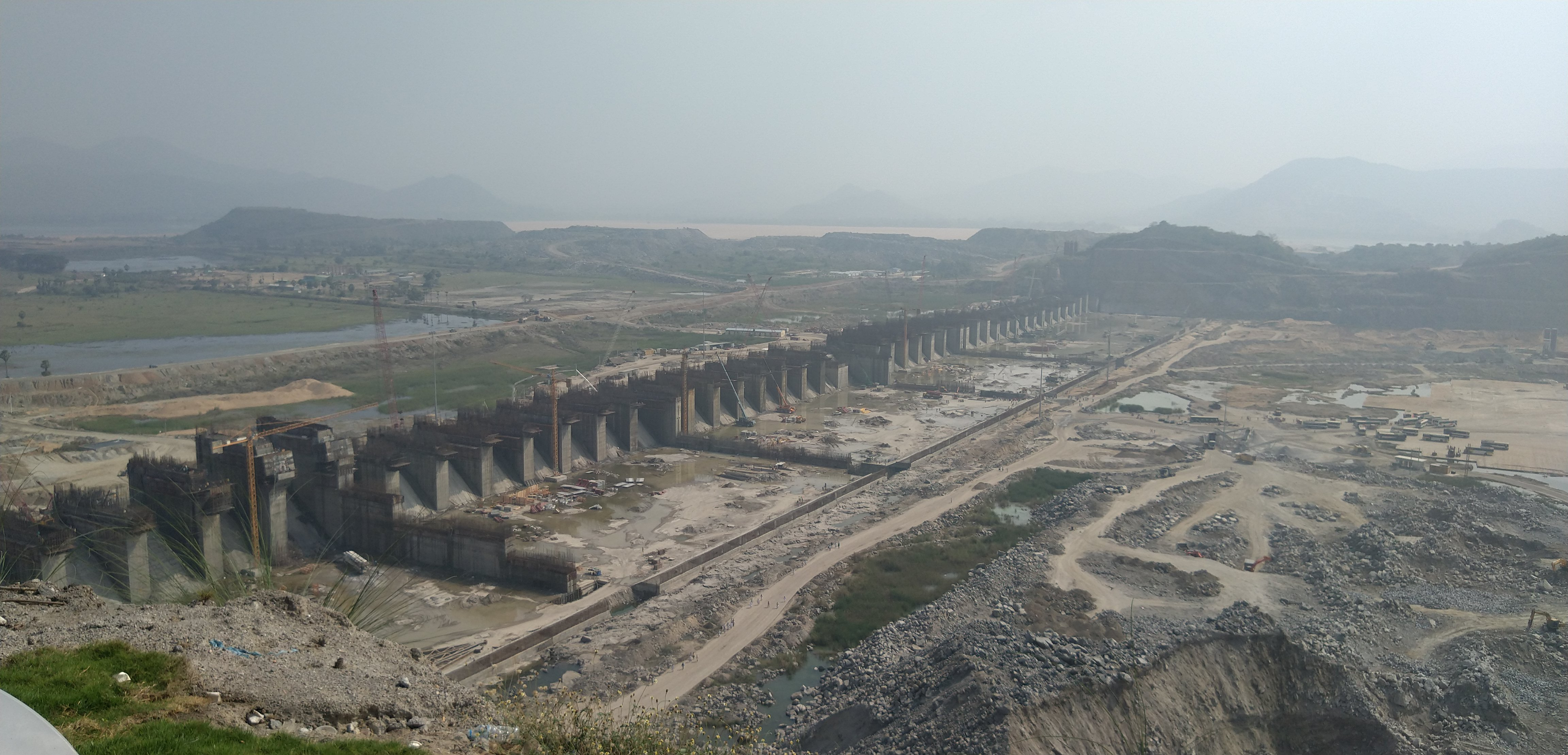
Polavaram Dam, Polavaram, Eluru

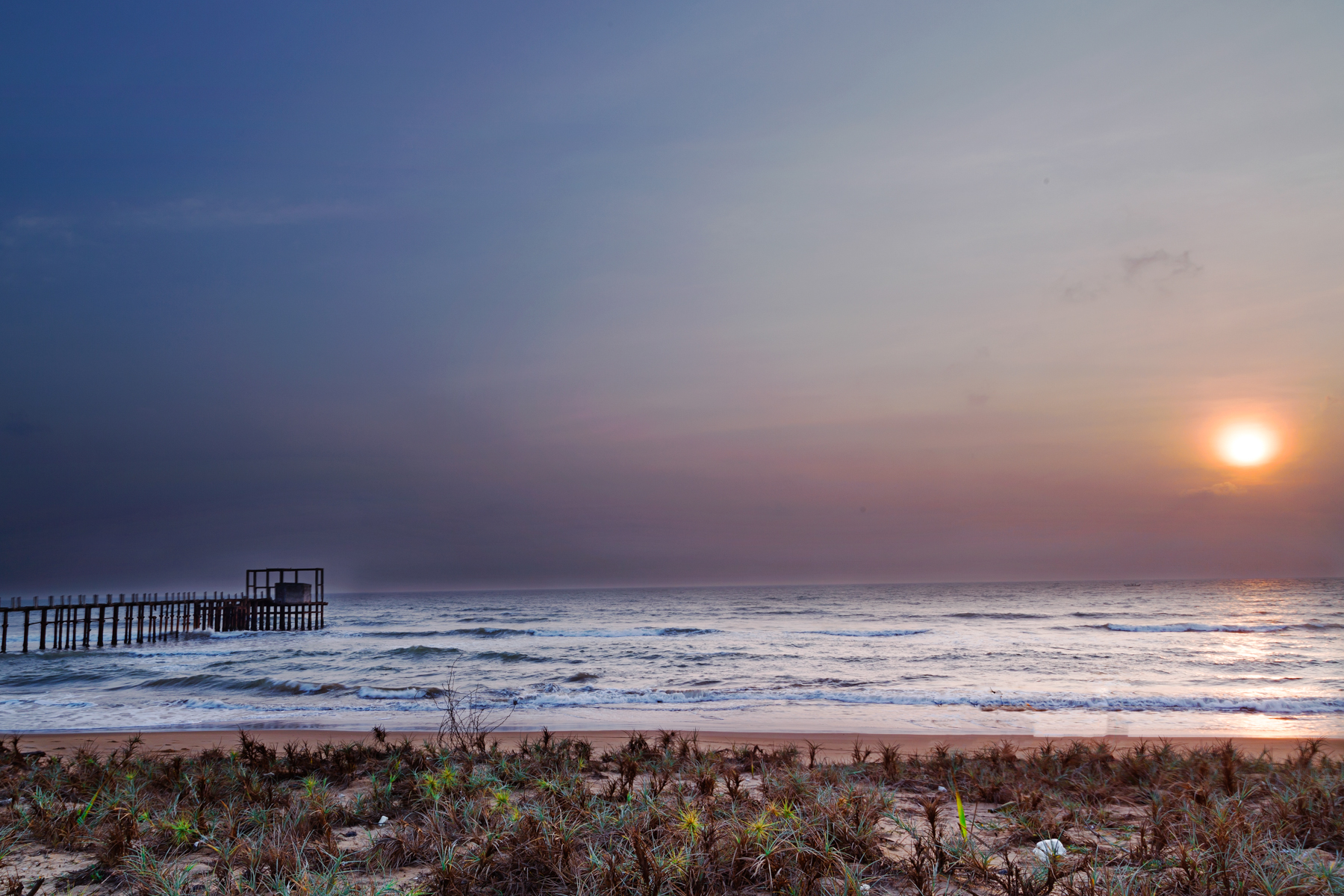
Mypadu Beach, Nellore

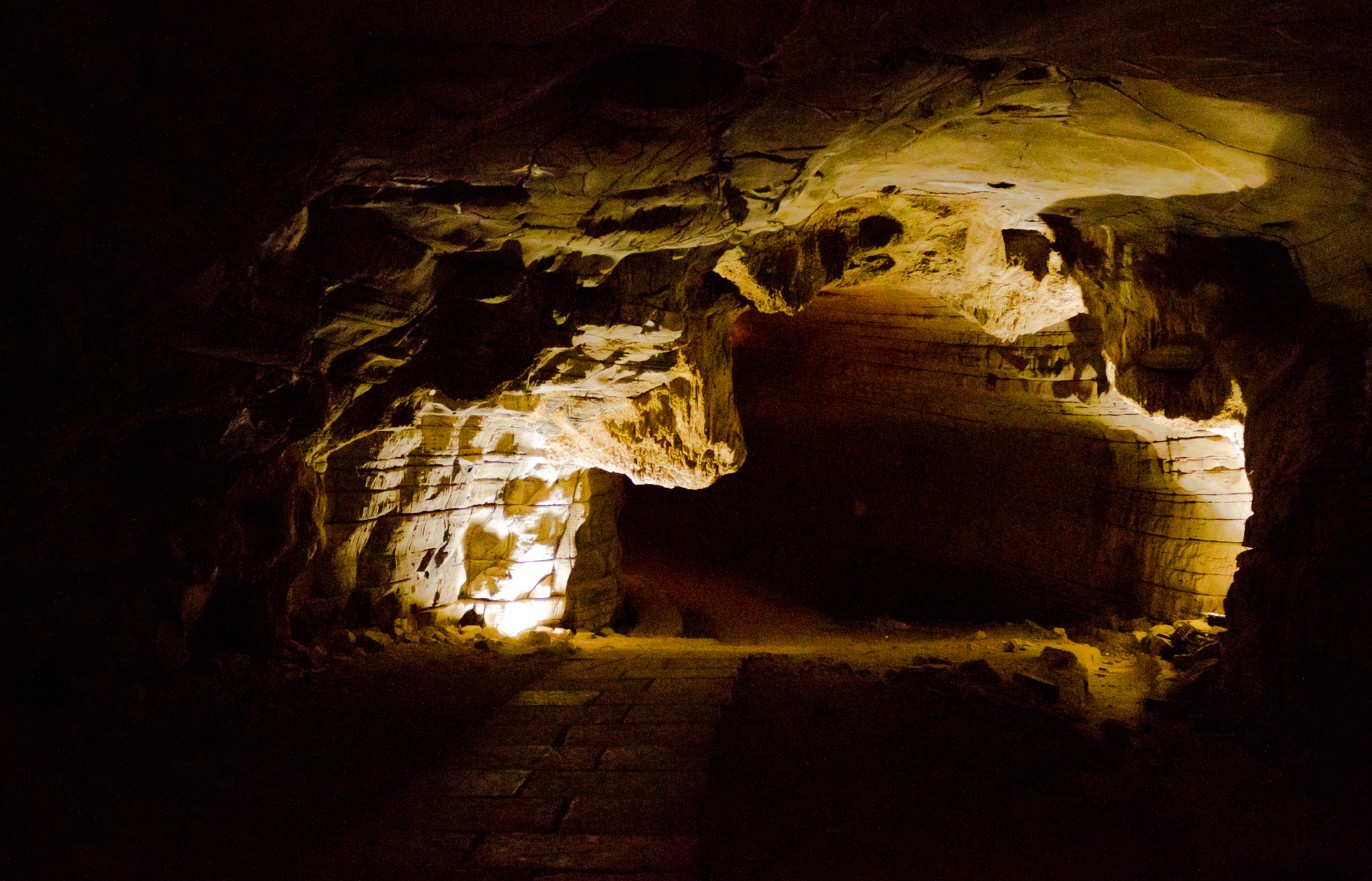
Belum Caves, Banaganapalli, Nandyal

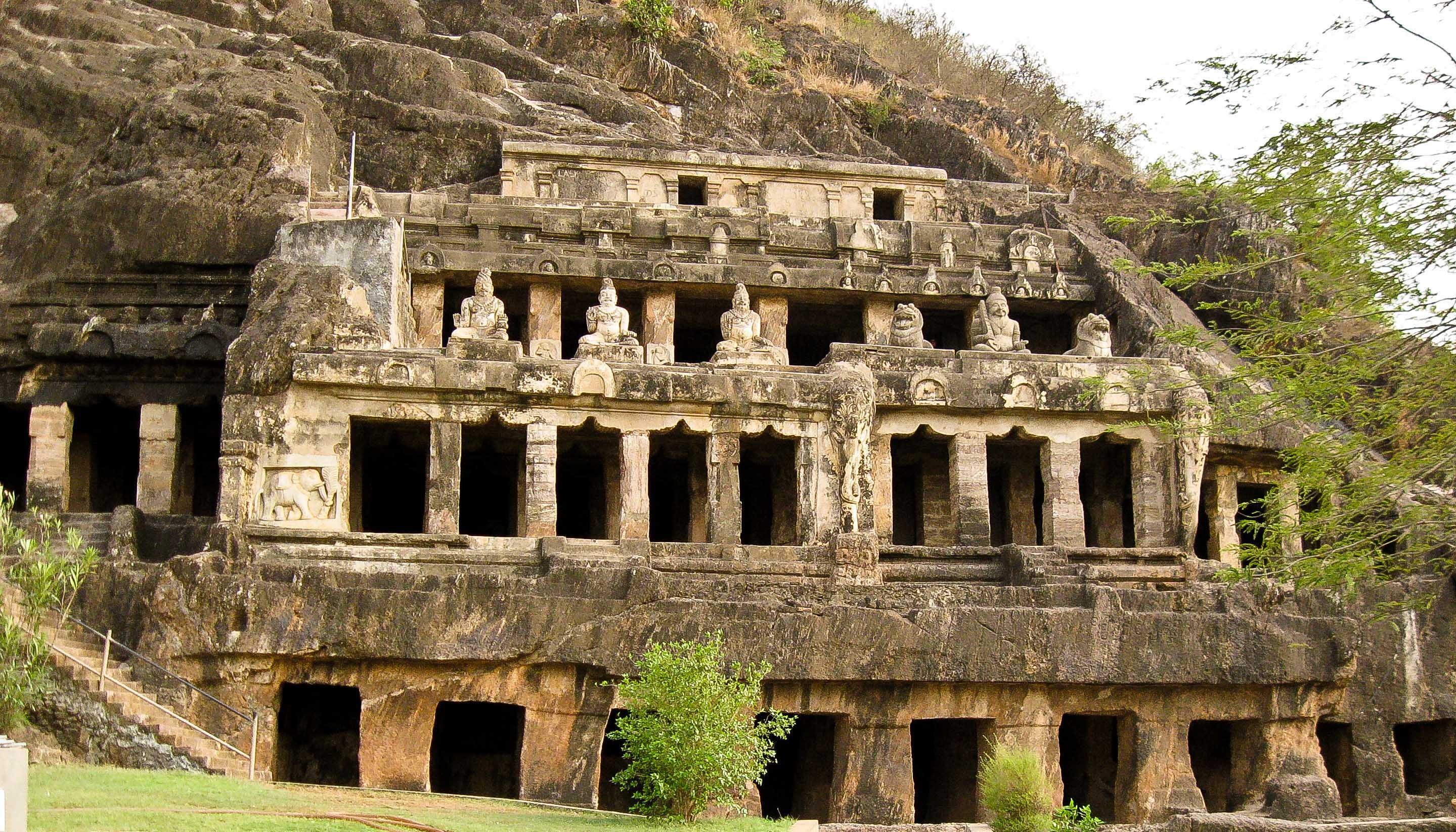
Undavalli Caves, Amaravati, Guntur

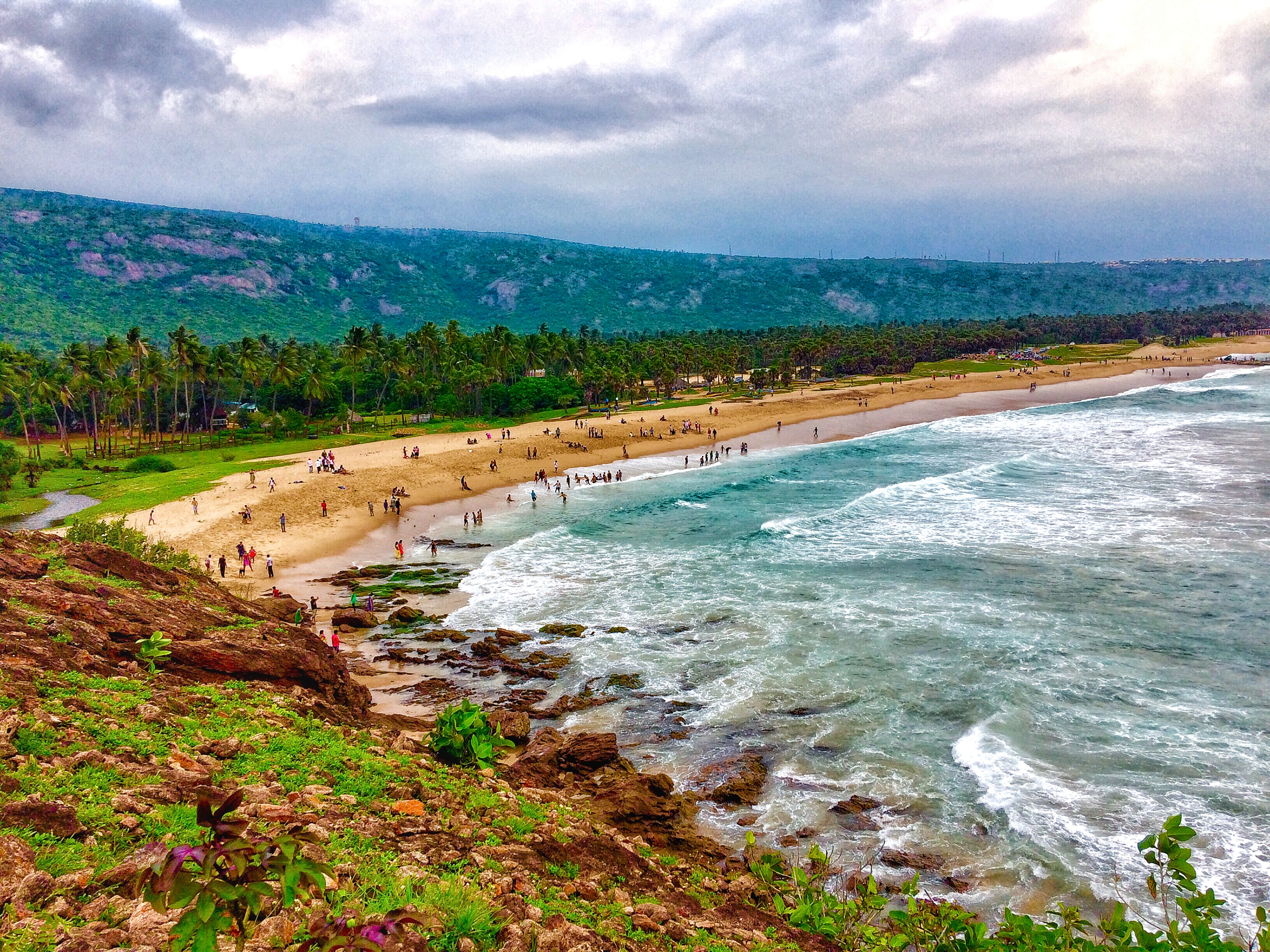
Yarada Beach, Visakhapatnam

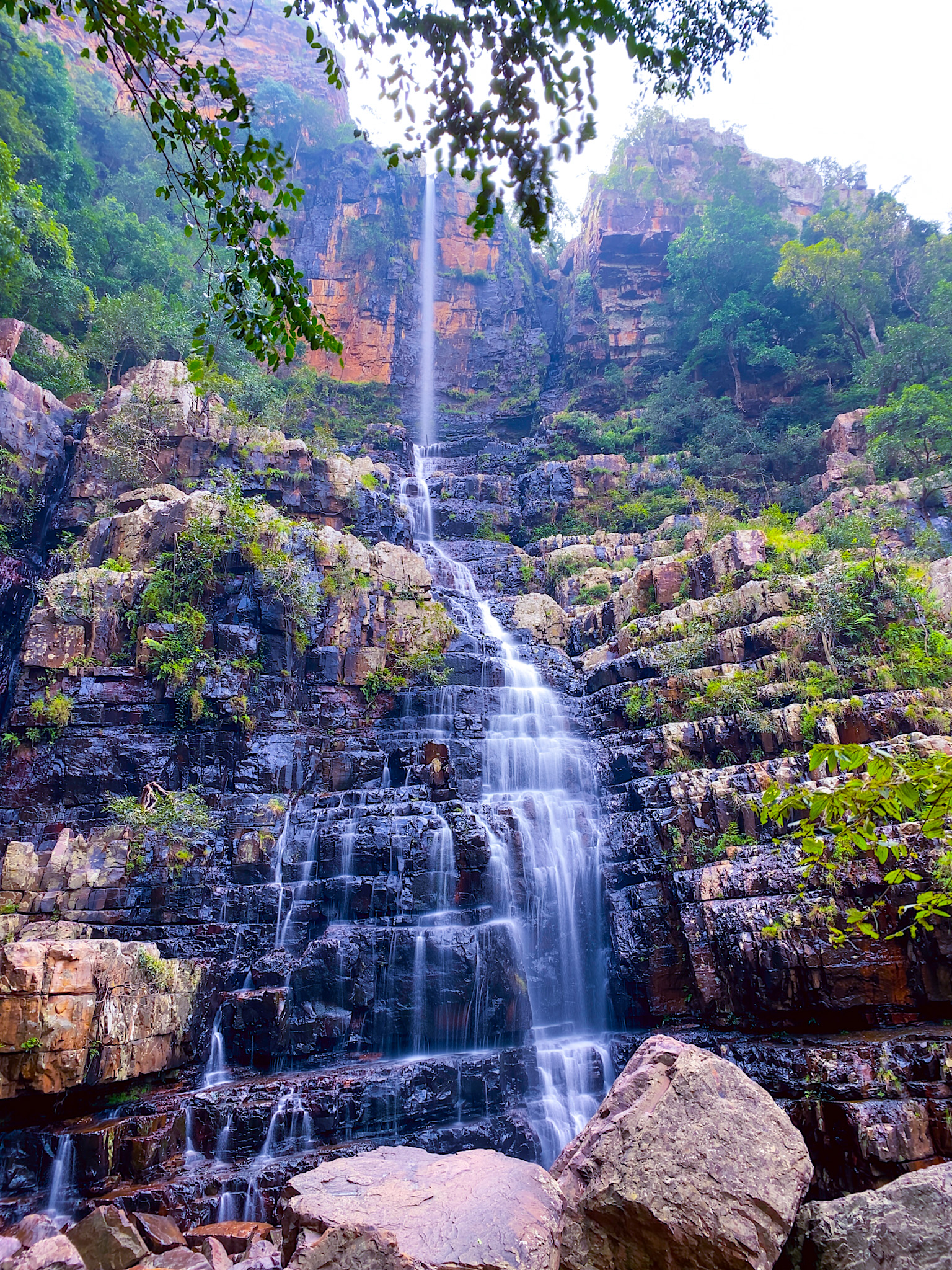
Talakona Waterfalls, Tirupati

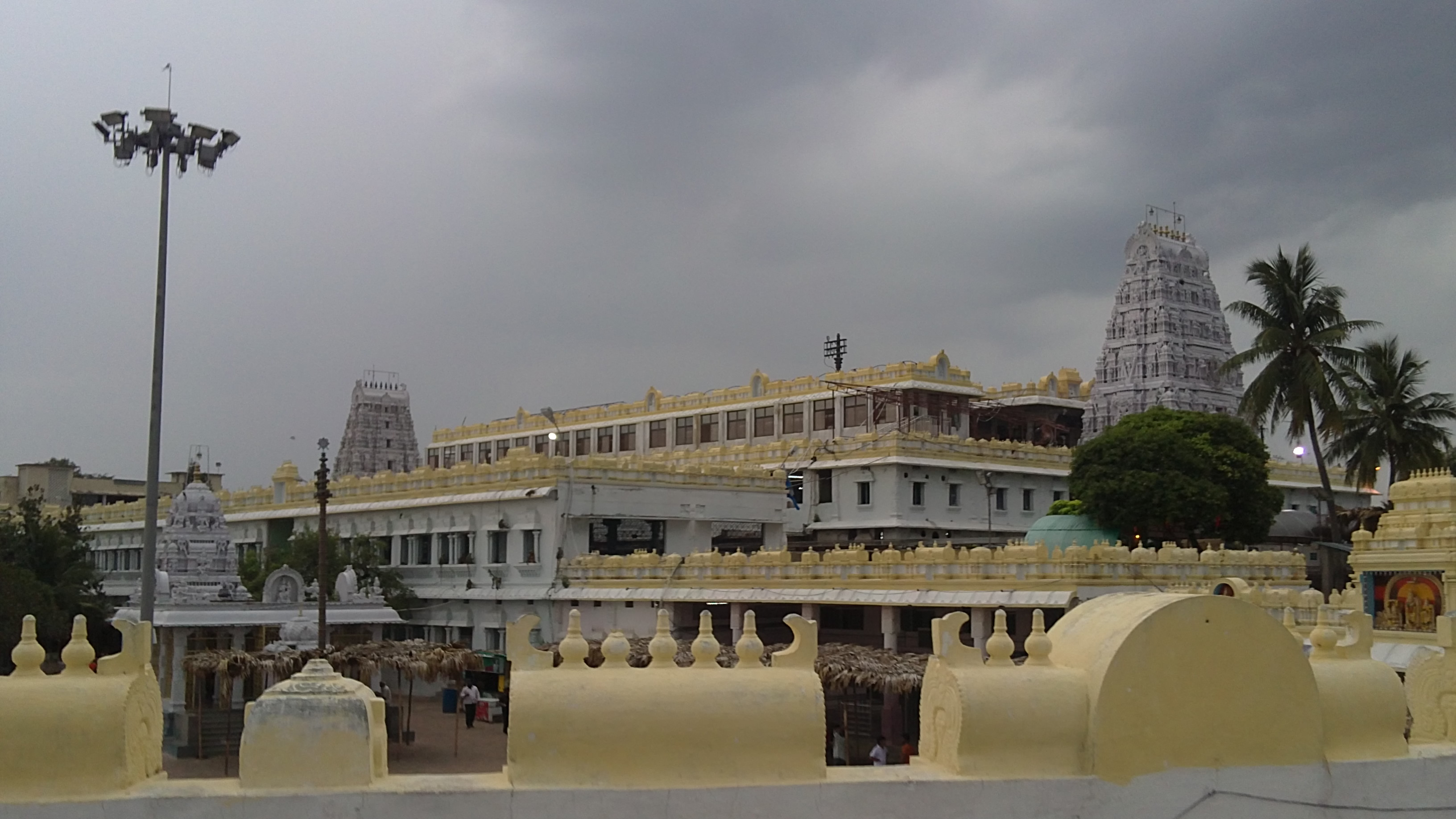
Satyanarayana Swamy Temple, Annavaram, East Godavari

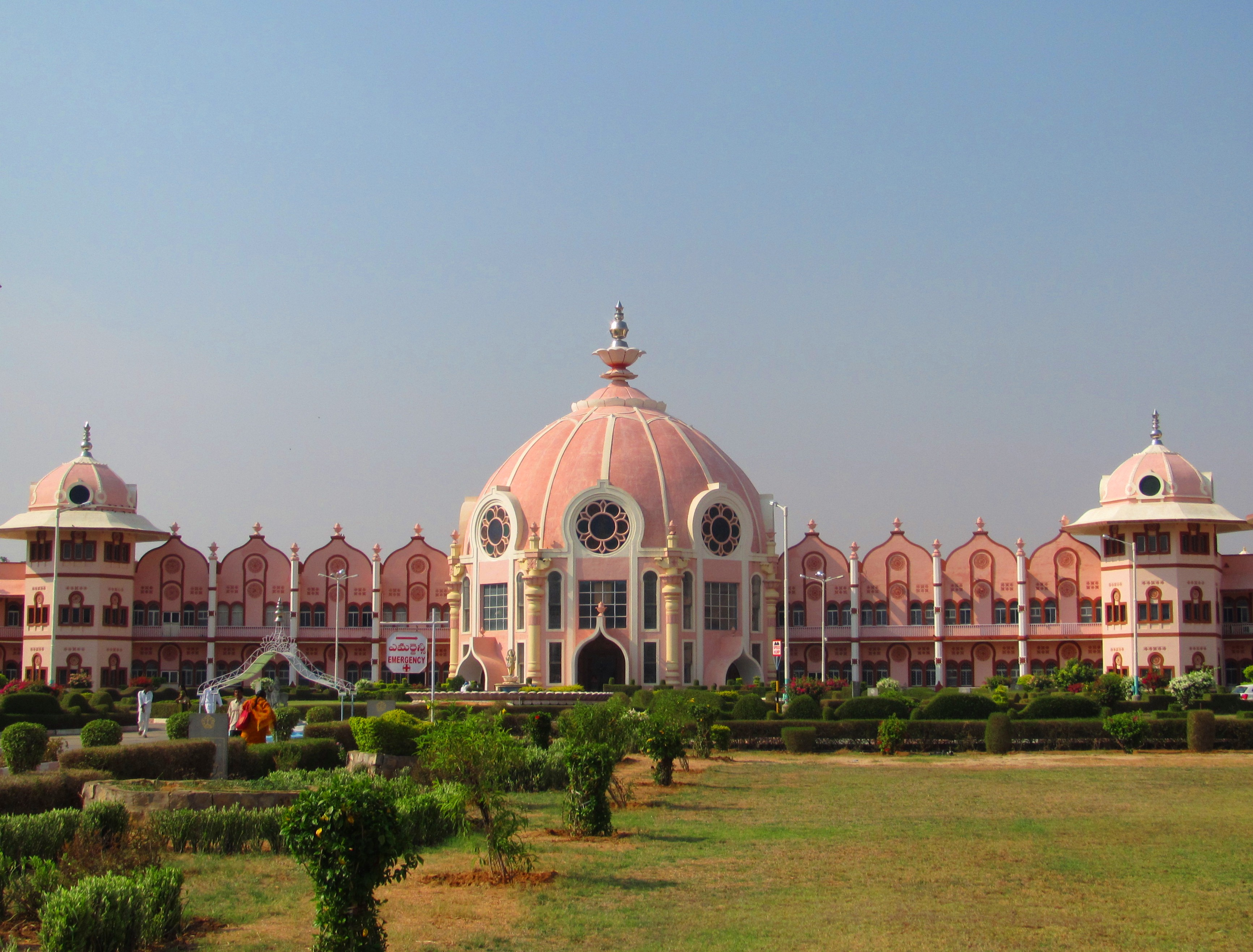
Puttaparthi, Sri Sathya Sai district

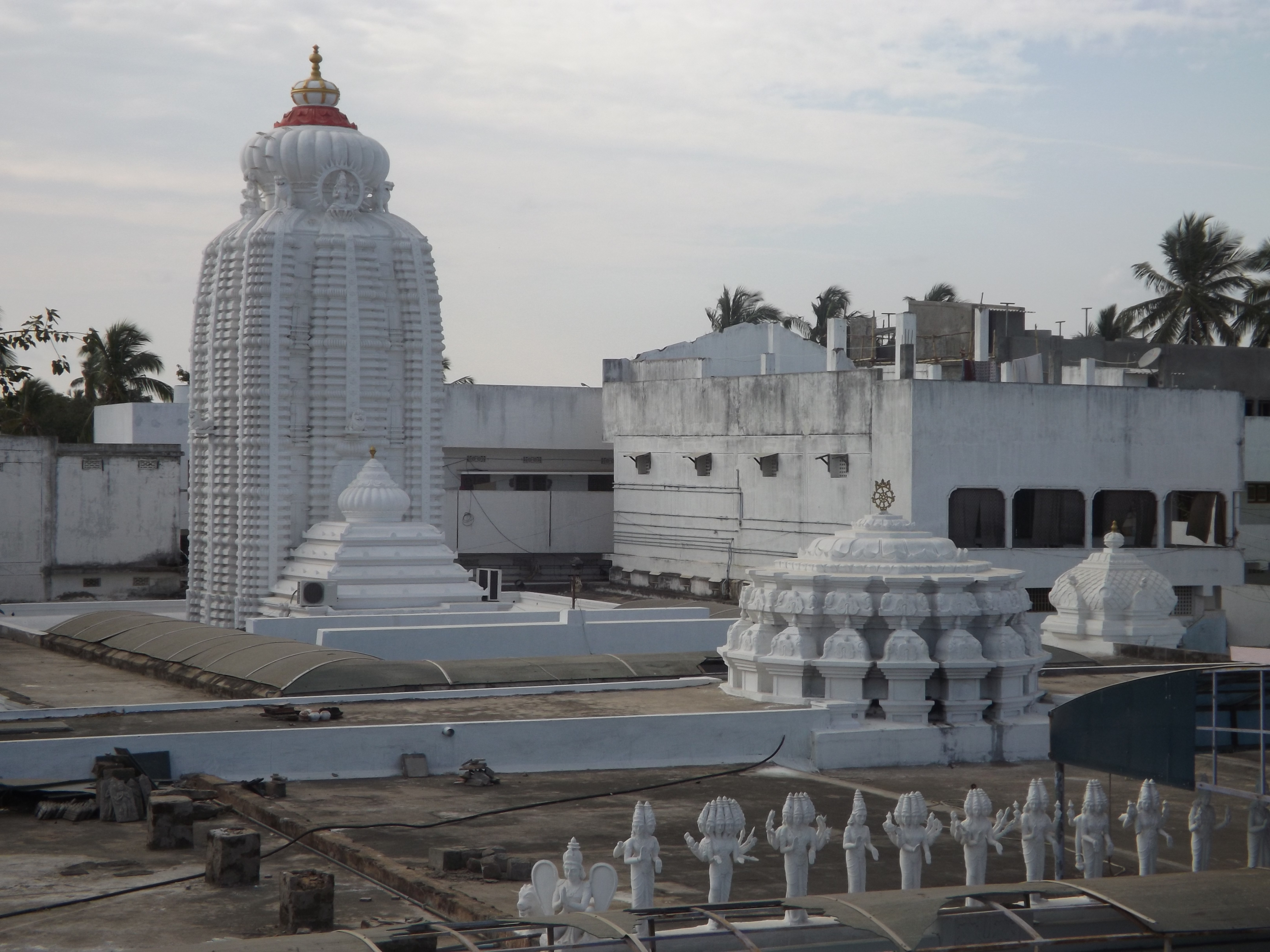
Sri Surya Narayana Swamy Temple, Arasavalli, Srikakulam

== See also ==
- List of urban agglomerations in Andhra Pradesh
- List of cities in India by population
- List of urban local bodies in Andhra Pradesh
- List of cities in Andhra Pradesh by population

== Notes ==
=== Sources ===
Source: STATISTICAL INFORMATION OF ULBs & UDAs also Office of the Registrar General and Census Commissioner (web), Delimitation Commission of India (web), Rand McNally International Atlas 1994, School of Planning & Architecture (web) - https://www.citypopulation.de/php/india-andhrapradesh.php

https://web.archive.org/web/20160128175528if_/http://dtcp.ap.gov.in:9090/webdtcp/Municipalities%20List-110.pdf

https://censusindia.gov.in/2011census/dchb/2811_PART_A_DCHB_SRIKAKULAM.pdf

https://censusindia.gov.in/2011census/dchb/2812_PART_A_DCHB_VIZIANAGARAM.pdf

https://censusindia.gov.in/2011census/dchb/2813_PART_A_DCHB_VISAKHAPATNAM.pdf

https://censusindia.gov.in/2011census/dchb/2814_PART_A_DCHB_EAST%20GODAVARI.pdf

https://censusindia.gov.in/2011census/dchb/2815_PART_A_DCHB_WEST%20GODAVARI.pdf

https://censusindia.gov.in/2011census/dchb/2816_PART_A_DCHB_KRISHNA.pdf

https://censusindia.gov.in/2011census/dchb/2817_PART_A_DCHB_GUNTUR.pdf

https://censusindia.gov.in/2011census/dchb/2818_PART_A_DCHB_PRAKASAM.pdf

https://censusindia.gov.in/2011census/dchb/2819_PART_A_DCHB_SRI%20POTTI%20SRIIAMULU%20NELLORE.pdf

https://censusindia.gov.in/2011census/dchb/2823_PART_A_DCHB_CHITTOOR.pdf

https://censusindia.gov.in/2011census/dchb/2820_PART_A_DCHB_YSR.pdf

https://censusindia.gov.in/2011census/dchb/2821_PART_A_DCHB_KURNOOL.pdf

https://censusindia.gov.in/2011census/dchb/2822_PART_A_DCHB_ANANTAPUR.pdf

https://www.newindianexpress.com/states/andhra-pradesh/2013/feb/11/22-villages-may-be-included-in-rajahmundry-soon-449459.html

http://smartcities.gov.in/upload/uploadfiles/files/AndraPradesh_Kakinada.pdf

https://timesofindia.indiatimes.com/city/vijayawada/CRDA-eyes-CSR-funds-to-push-job-potential-in-capital-city/articleshow/47891827.cms

=== References ===
https://www.deccanchronicle.com/nation/current-affairs/300517/ap-to-develop-14-smart-cities-across-state.html
