= National Highway 565 (India) =

National highway in India

National Highway 565
- Map of the National Highway in red

Route information
- Length: 506.11 km (314.48 mi)

Major junctions
- North end: Nakrekal
- List: NH 65 at Nakrekal; NAM Expressways at Nalgonda; NH 765
- South end: NH 71 at yerpedu

Location
- Country: India
- States: Telangana, Andhra Pradesh
- Primary destinations: Nakrekal, Nalgonda, Macherla, Yerragondapalem, Markapur, Chinarikatla junction (PODILI), Kanigiri, Pamur, Duttalur, Penchalakona, Rapur, Venkatagiri, Yerpedu Road

Highway system
- Roads in India; Expressways; National; State; Asian

National Highway 565 (NH 565), is a national highway in India, which was formed as a new National Highway by up-gradation and passes through the state of Andhra Pradesh. It starts at Nakrekal of Telangana and ends at Yerpedu of Andhra Pradesh.

New Alignment of this National Highway 565, was Opened to traffic between Chunchuluru to Rapur through Penchelakona Forest.

== Route ==
It starts at junction of National Highway 65 Nakrekal and passes through Nalgonda on the Nagarjuna Sagar road until Telangana border and then through Macherla, Yerragondapalem, Markapur, Chinarikatla junction (PODILI), Kanigiri, Pamur, Duttalur, Penchalakona, Rapur, and Venkatagiri before terminating at National Highway 71 at Yerpedu in Andhra Pradesh.

State–wise route length (in km):

- Telangana – 86.06 km (53.48 mi)
- Andhra Pradesh – 420.05 km (261.01 mi)

NHAI has taken up widening of this highway into two lane with paved shoulders throughout the stretch. Widening works were expected to be completed by the end of 2017.

== Junctions ==
Telangana
NH 65 Terminal near Nakirekal.
NH 167 near Haliya.
Andhra Pradesh

 NH 544F near Devarajugattu.

NH 167AD near Macherla.

NH 765 near Hanuman Junction(Kunta).

NH 167B near Pamur.

NH 167BG at Duttalur.

NH 67 at Chunchuluru.

NH 71 Terminal at Yerpedu.

== See also ==
- List of national highways in Andhra Pradesh
