= Cumbum mandal =

- Mandal
- Interactive map of Cumbum mandal
- Location in Andhra Pradesh, India
- Coordinates: 15°34′N 79°6′E
- Country: India
- State: Andhra Pradesh
- District: Markapuram
- Headquarters: Cumbum

Area
  - Total: 132.65 km^{2} (51.22 sq mi)

Population (2011)
  - Total: 48,698
  - Density: 367.12/km^{2} (950.83/sq mi)

Languages
  - Official: Telugu
- Time zone: UTC+5:30 (IST)

Cumbum mandal is a mandal in Markapuram district of the Indian state of Andhra Pradesh. It is administered under Markapur revenue division and its headquarters are located at Cumbum. The mandal is bounded by Ardhaveedu, Markapur, Tarlupadu, Racherla, Bestavaripeta mandals and two rivers namely, Gundlakamma and Vemuleru rivers flows through it.

== Demographics ==
As of 2011 census, the mandal had a population of 48,698. The total population constitute, 23,963 males and 24,735 females —a sex ratio of 1032 females per 1000 males. 5,124 children are in the age group of 0–6 years, of which 2,655 are boys and 2,469 are girls —a ratio of 930 per 1000. The average literacy rate stands at 73.04% with 31,827 literates. It has the least urban area of 8.81 km^{2} (3.40 mi^{2}).

== Towns and villages ==
As of 2011 census, the mandal has 16 settlements, that includes:

1. Anantha Palle
2. Auranga Bad
3. Cumbum (CT)
4. China Cumbum
5. Ravipadu
6. Hazarat Gudem
7. Kagitalagudem
8. Kandula Puram
9. Jangamguntla
10. Lanja Kota
11. Lingapuram Khandrika
12. Linga Puram
13. Porumamilla Palle
14. Nadim Palle
15. Ravipadu
16. Thurimella
17. Yerrabalem

Note: CT–Census Town

Sources:

- Census India 2011 (sub districts)

== See also ==
- Markapuram district
