= Mannanur =

Mannanur may refer to:

- Mannanur, Nagarkurnool, Telangana, India
- Mannanur, Palakkad, Kerala, India
