= National Highway 167 (India) =

National highway in India

National Highway 167
- Map of the National Highway in red

Route information
- Auxiliary route of NH 67
- Length: 483 km (300 mi)

Major junctions
- West end: Hagari
- East end: Kodad

Location
- Country: India
- States: Karnataka, Andhra Pradesh, Telangana.
- Primary destinations: Hagari, Alur, Adoni, Yemmiganur, Mantralayam, Raichur, Makthal, Mahabubnagar, Jadcherla, Kalwakurthy, Devarakonda, Nidamanur, Miryalaguda, Huzurnagar, Kodad.

Highway system
- Roads in India; Expressways; National; State; Asian
← NH 166	→ NH 167

National Highway 167 (NH 167), is a national highway in India, which was formed as a new National Highway by up-gradation and passes through the states of Karnataka, Telangana and Andhra Pradesh. It starts at Hagari in Karnataka and ends at Kodad in Telangana. It is a secondary route of National Highway 67.

== Route ==
It starts at the junction of Hagari and passes through Alur, Adoni, Yemmiganur, Mantralayam, Raichur, Mahabubnagar, Jadcherla, Kalwakurthy, Deverakonda, Konda malle pally, Haliya, NIDMANOOR, Miryalaguda, Nereducherla, Huzurnagar, Kodad in Telangana.

State–wise route length (in km.)

- Andhra Pradesh – 99.15 km (61.61 mi)
- Karnataka – 55 km (34 mi)
- Telangana - 321.88 km (200.01 mi)

== Junctions list ==
NH 67 Terminal near Paramadevanahalli.
NH 150 near Krishna.
NH 44 near Jadcherla.
NH 765 near Kalwakurthy.
NH 565 near Nidamanoor.
NH 65 Terminal near Kodad.

== Sirat-e-joodi bridge ==
Sirat-e-joodi bridge over Krishna river was constructed between 1933 and 1943. The bridge was named as Sirat-e-joodi in honour of Nawab Javvadjaha Bahadur, the prince of Hyderabad. This 82–83 years old bridge is 2,488 feet (758 m) long, 20 feet (6.1 m) wide and 60 feet (18 m) high from the riverbed of Krishna river. near Shakthinagar, Raichur

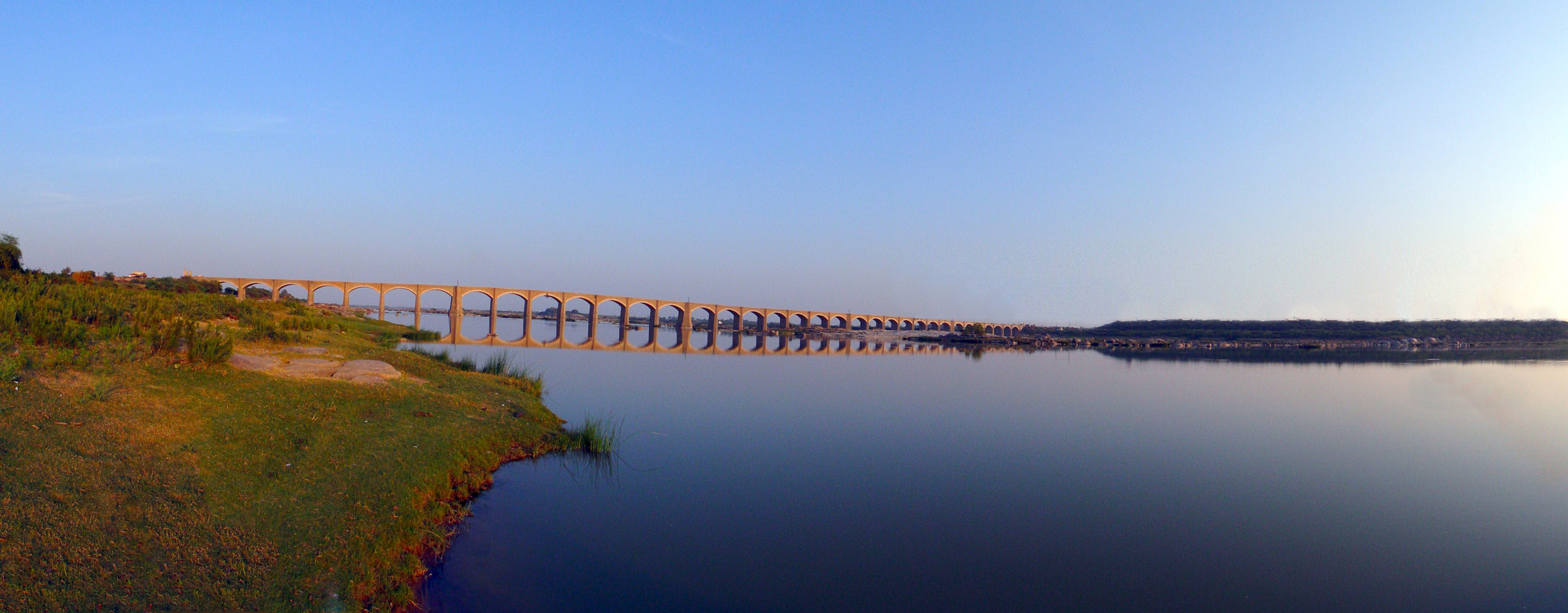
Sirat-e-joodi bridge over Krishna river carries NH 167

== See also ==
- List of national highways in India
- List of national highways in India by state
- List of state highways in Karnataka
