= Takkellapadu =

Takkellapadu may refer to:

== Places ==
=== Andhra Pradesh, India ===
- Takkellapadu, Guntur district
- Takkellapadu, Kanigiri mandal - village in Markapuram district
- Takkellapadu, Prakasam district
- Thakkellpadu, Nandigama Mandal, Krishna district
