= Ganapavaram =

Ganapavaram may refer to:

- Ganapavaram, Nadendla mandal, a village in Guntur district, Andhra Pradesh, India
- Ganapavaram, Markapuram district, a village in Markapuram district, Andhra Pradesh, India
- Ganapavaram, West Godavari district, a village in West Godavari district, Andhra Pradesh, India
- Ganapavaram mandal, one of the mandals in West Godavari district of the Indian state of Andhra Pradesh
