= Patil Neeraja Reddy =

Indian politician

Patil Neeraja Reddy (1967 – 2023) was an Indian politician from Andhra Pradesh. She was a member of the Andhra Pradesh Legislative Assembly from Alur Assembly constituency in Kurnool district. She last won the 2009 Andhra Pradesh Legislative Assembly election representing the Indian National Congress.

== Early life and education ==
Reddy was from Thernakal village, Devanakonda mandal, Kurnool district, Andhra Pradesh. She married P. Seshi Reddy, a former MLA of Pathikonda, who was killed in 1996. Together they had a daughter, Hima Varsha Reddy. She completed her M.A. in public administration at Madurai Kamaraj University in 2007.

== Career ==
Reddy won from Alur Assembly constituency representing the Indian National Congress in the 2009 Andhra Pradesh Legislative Assembly election. She polled 43,105 votes and defeated her nearest rival, Gummanur Jayaram of the Praja Rajyam Party, by a margin of 5,645 votes. She joined YSR Congress Party in 2019.

=== Death ===
Reddy died at a hospital in Kurnool on 16 April 2023. She met with a road accident when her car tumbled down a steep gradient after a puncture in Jinkallapalli, Itikyala mandal, Jogulamba Gadwal district, Telangana while returning from Hyderabad. She was admitted in a private hospital in Kurool, along with her driver, but she died while undergoing treatment.
