= Degalahal =

- Village
- Interactive map of Degalahal
- Location in Andhra Pradesh, India Degalahal (India)
- Coordinates: 15.1847°N 77.2355°E
- Country: India
- State: Andhra Pradesh
- District: Kurnool

Population (2011)
  - Total: 1,964

Languages
  - Official: Telugu
- Time zone: UTC+5:30 (IST)

Degalahal is a village in Chippagiri Mandal, located in Kurnool district of Indian state of Andhra Pradesh.
