= NH 150 =

NH 150 may refer to:

- National Highway 150 (India)
- New Hampshire Route 150, United States
