= Peda Araveedu =

- Village
- Interactive map of Peda Araveedu
- Location in Andhra Pradesh, India Peda Araveedu (India)
- Coordinates: 15.8°N 79.2333°E
- Country: India
- State: Andhra Pradesh
- District: Markapuram
- Talukas: Pedda Raveedu

Area
  - Total: 22.95 km^{2} (8.86 sq mi)

Population (2011)
  - Total: 5,547
  - Density: 241.7/km^{2} (626.0/sq mi)

Languages
  - Official: Telugu
- Time zone: UTC+5:30 (IST)
- Vehicle registration: AP
- Website: markapur.cdma.ap.gov.in/en

Pedda Araveedu is a village in Markapuram district of the Indian state of Andhra Pradesh. It is the mandal headquarters of Peda Araveedu mandal Markapur revenue division.
