= B. V. Mohan Reddy =

Indian politician (1955–2012)

B. V. Mohan Reddy (1955 – 27 July 2012) was an Indian politician from Andhra Pradesh. He was a former five time member of the Andhra Pradesh Legislative Assembly from Yemmiganur Assembly constituency in Kurnool district representing the Telugu Desam Party. After winning the byelection in 1983, he won consecutively in 1985, 1989, 1994 and 1999.

== Early life ==
Reddy was from Yemmiganur, Kurnool district, Andhra Pradesh. He was the son of the late B. Bali Reddy. He studied till Class 5 and dropped out of school. He decalred assets worth Rs.50,000 in 2009 in his affidavit to the Election Commission of India.

== Career ==
Reddy joined the Telugu Desam Party in 1982 and first became an MLA winning the Yemmiganur Assembly constituency in the 1983 byelection representing the Telugu Desam Party. He retained the seat for the Telugu Desam Party winning the next four consecutive elections in 1985, 1989, 1994 and 1999 to become a five time MLA.
