= Jaya Nageswara Reddy =

Indian politician (born 1977)

Byreddy Jaya Nageswara Reddy

Member of Legislative Assembly Andhra Pradesh
- Incumbent
- Assumed office 2024
- Preceded by: K. Chennakesava Reddy
- Constituency: Yemmiganur

Personal details
- Party: Telugu Desam Party

Byreddy Jaya Nageswara Reddy (born 1977) is an Indian politician from Andhra Pradesh. He is an MLA from Yemmiganur Assembly constituency in Kurnool district. He represents Telugu Desam Party. He won the 2024 Andhra Pradesh Legislative Assembly election where TDP had an alliance with BJP and Jana Sena Party.

== Early life and education ==
Reddy is from Yemmiganur, Kurnool district. His late father was B. V. Mohan Reddy. He is a doctor and married a doctor. He completed his M.B.B.S. in 2004 at NTR University of Health Sciences, Vijayawada.

== Political career ==
Reddy won the 2024 Andhra Pradesh Legislative Assembly election from Yemmiganur Assembly constituency. He polled 1,03,089 votes and defeated his nearest rival, Butta Renuka of YSR Congress Party by a margin of 15,837 votes. Earlier, he became an MLA for the first time winning the 2014 Andhra Pradesh Legislative Assembly election. He polled 84,483 votes and defeated his nearest rival, K. Jagan Mohan Reddy, of YSR Congress Party by a margin of 14,361 votes.
