= Bhairavakona =

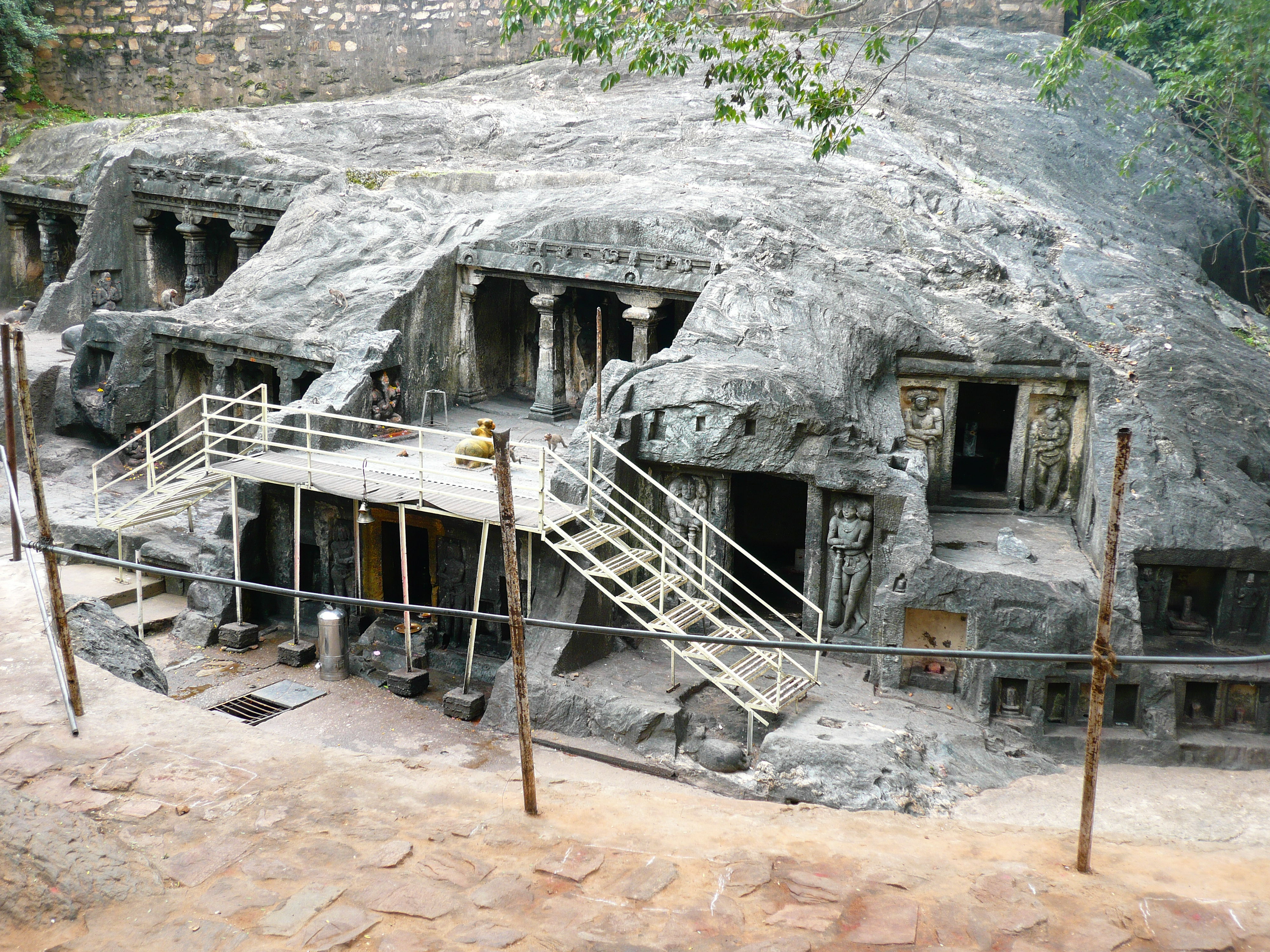
- BhairavaKona cave temples view

- Location within Andhra Pradesh

Religion
- Affiliation: Hinduism
- District: Markapuram
- Festivals: Mahasivaratri, Karthika Pournami

Location
- State: Andhra Pradesh
- Country: India
- Coordinates: 15.088595°N 79.201737°E

Bhairavakona (/bhaɪrəvəˈkoʊnə/; BHy-ruh-vuh-kone-uh) is a holy place situated on the heart of Nallamala Hills in the Markapuram district of the Indian State of Andhra Pradesh. This place is notable for eight different forms of cave temples of Shiva dating to 7th or the 8th century CE. The rock cut cave temples here are quite similar to some of the rock cut temples in Mahabalipuram. Each temple presents Brahma-Vishnu-Shiva combination.

== Etymology ==
There are two local legends which attribute to its name.

According to the first one, a shepherd named 'Kalabhairava Kondayya' used to live here along with his cattle which used to drink water from the nearby waterfall or water spring. Once when the water level was very low due to a drought he was unable to provide the cattle with water. So, he prayed to god and vows to offer himself to god if the water level rises in the spring. Suddenly, the water level starts to rise and the cattle quench their thirst. So as promised, Kondayya offered himself to god by cutting his head, hence giving the place its name, 'Bhairava Kona'.

According to the second one, a king named 'Kalabhairava' ruled this placed a long time ago giving this place the name 'Bhairava Kona'.

== Geography ==
భైరవకోన

Bhairavakona is 15 km (9.3 mi) from Seetharamauram, 23 km (14 mi) from Chandrasekharapuram and 35 km (22 mi) from Pamuru in Kothapalli hill range. It is about 43 km (27 mi) from Udayagiri, a town in Nellore district. APSRTC's runs buses to Seetharamapuram from which share autos ply to Bhairavakona.

== Architecture ==
The Bhairavakona rock cut cave temples are a historically important Shaivism tradition site. They are carved out of a single rock in the Nallamala hills. These hills are a part of the Eastern Ghats that run north-south near Vijayanagara Empire ruins site of Udayagiri, Andhra Pradesh. This area features natural waterfalls and a scenic ambience.

This place is home to 8 temples of Shiva. The notable features of these rock cut caves are the inscriptions and eight different forms of Shiva: Shashinaga, Rudra, Visweswara, Nagarikeswara, Bhargeswara, Rameswara, Mallikarjuna and Pakshamalika Linga. The script and the iconography suggests that this rock cut temple was built in the 7th or the 8th century CE. The rock cut cave temples here are quite similar to some of the rock cut temples in Mahabalipuram. Each temple presents Brahma-Vishnu-Shiva combination. Saraswati-Lakshmi-Parvati are also carved into the single rock. Fusion deities such as Harihara are also part of the reliefs.

Life size dwarapalikas, cut out pillars of lions, gavaksha (Gavākṣha), Ganesha and other Hindu deities are also some of the reliefs presented in these temples.

A small Kala Bhairava Swamy temple is opposite to the main temple separated by a small lake. There is a waterfall which falls from a height of 200 metres.

== Festivals ==
Mahasivaratri, Kartika Purnima are two of the major festivals celebrated in which large number of pilgrims visit the temple. Moonlight falls on the idol of goddess Parvati on Kartika Poornima day.

== Gallery ==
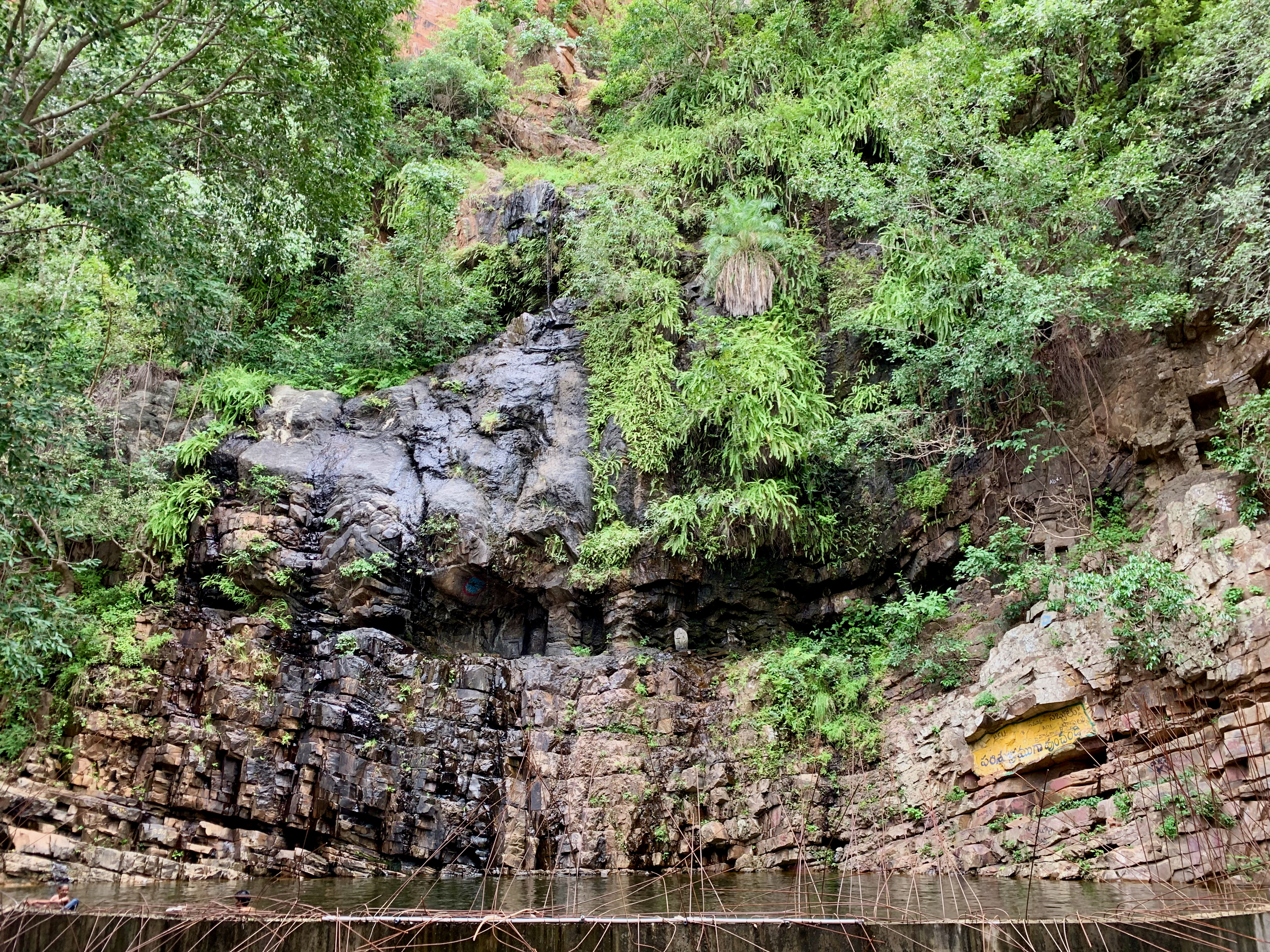
Sonavana waterfalls suitable for bathing near temple complex

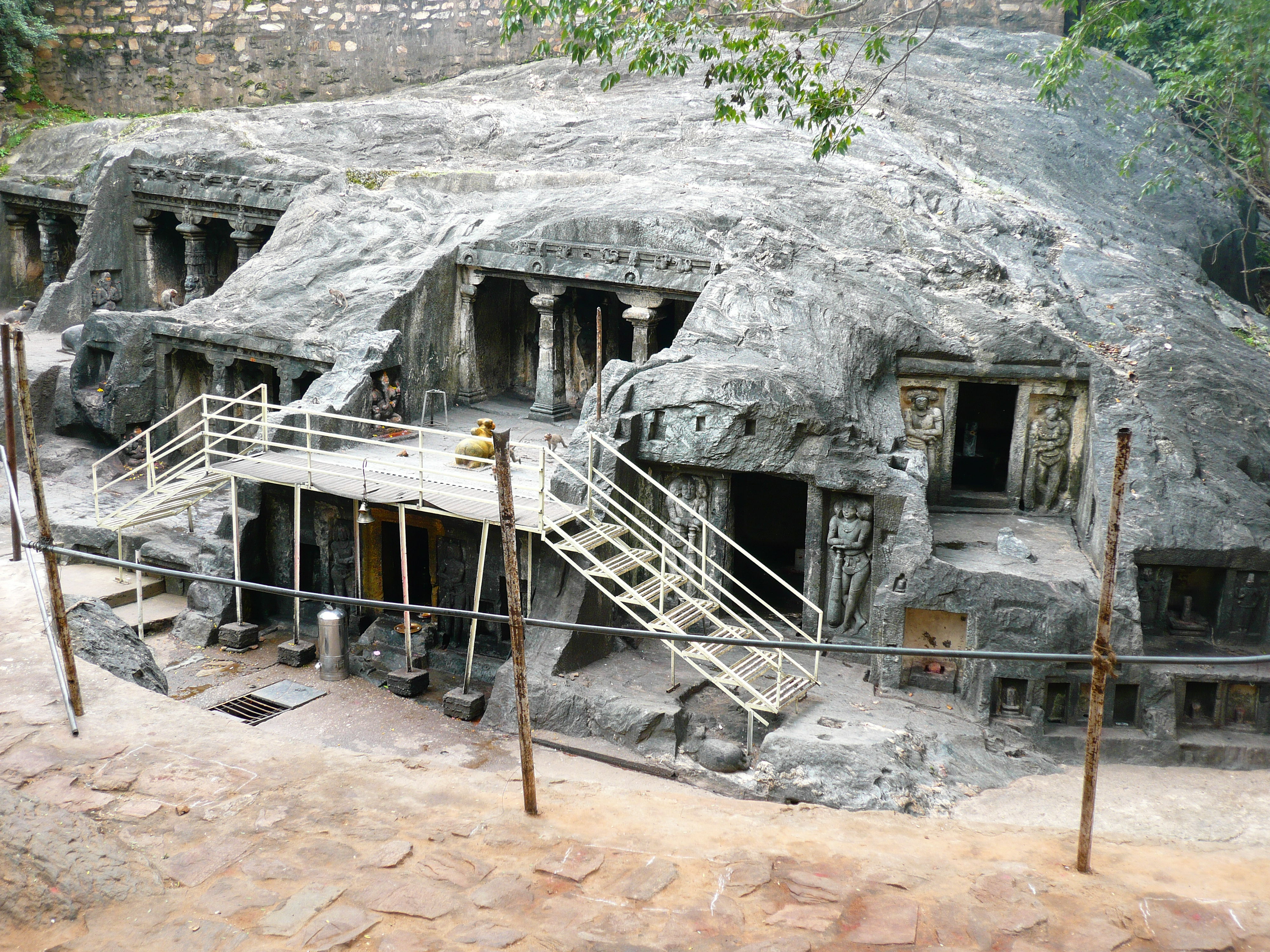
Main temple with Bhargeswara lingam in the foreground and Trimuka Durga mahadevi in the lower court

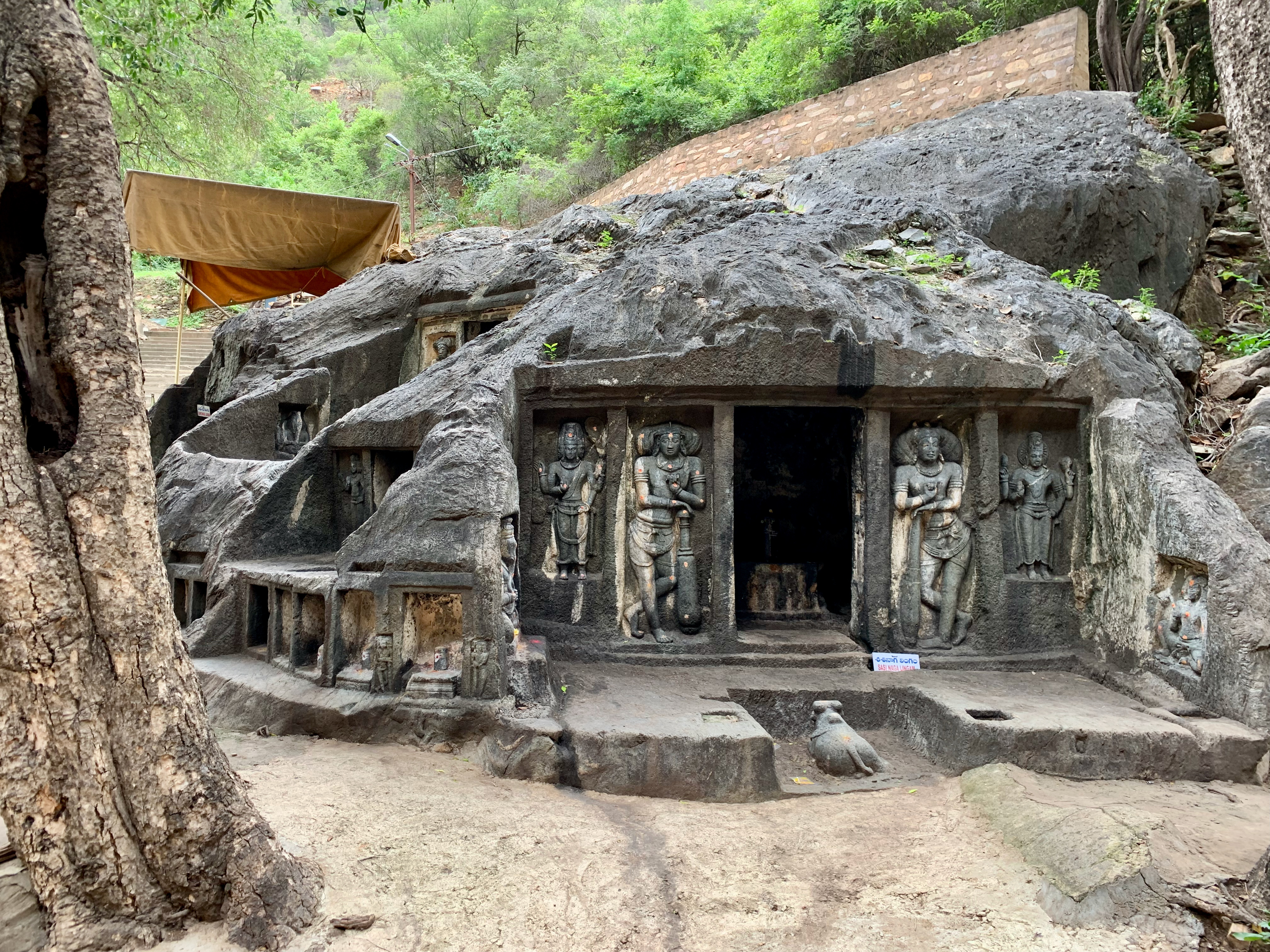
Sasinagalingam cave temple

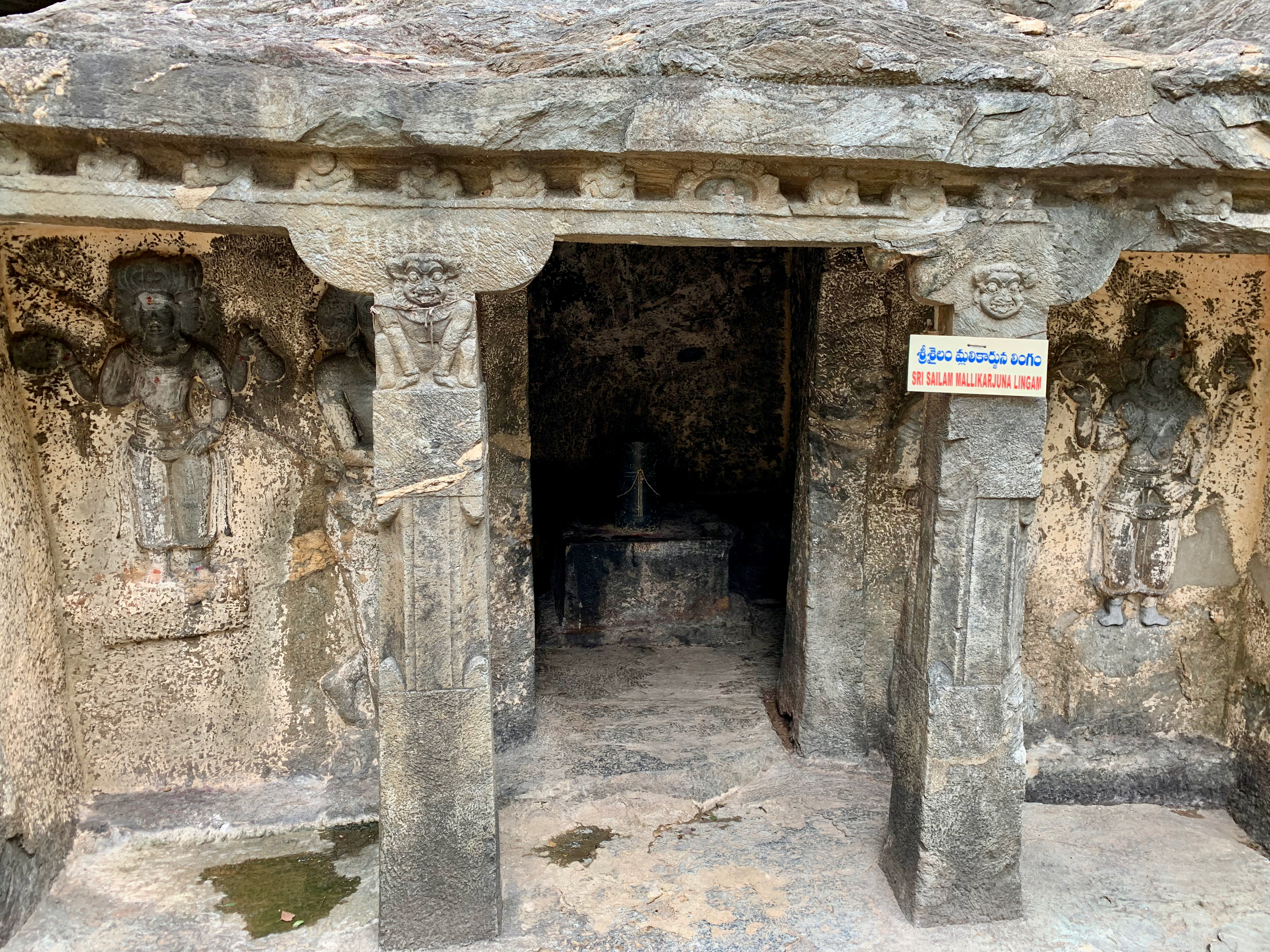
Srisaila Mallikarjuna Lingam cave temple

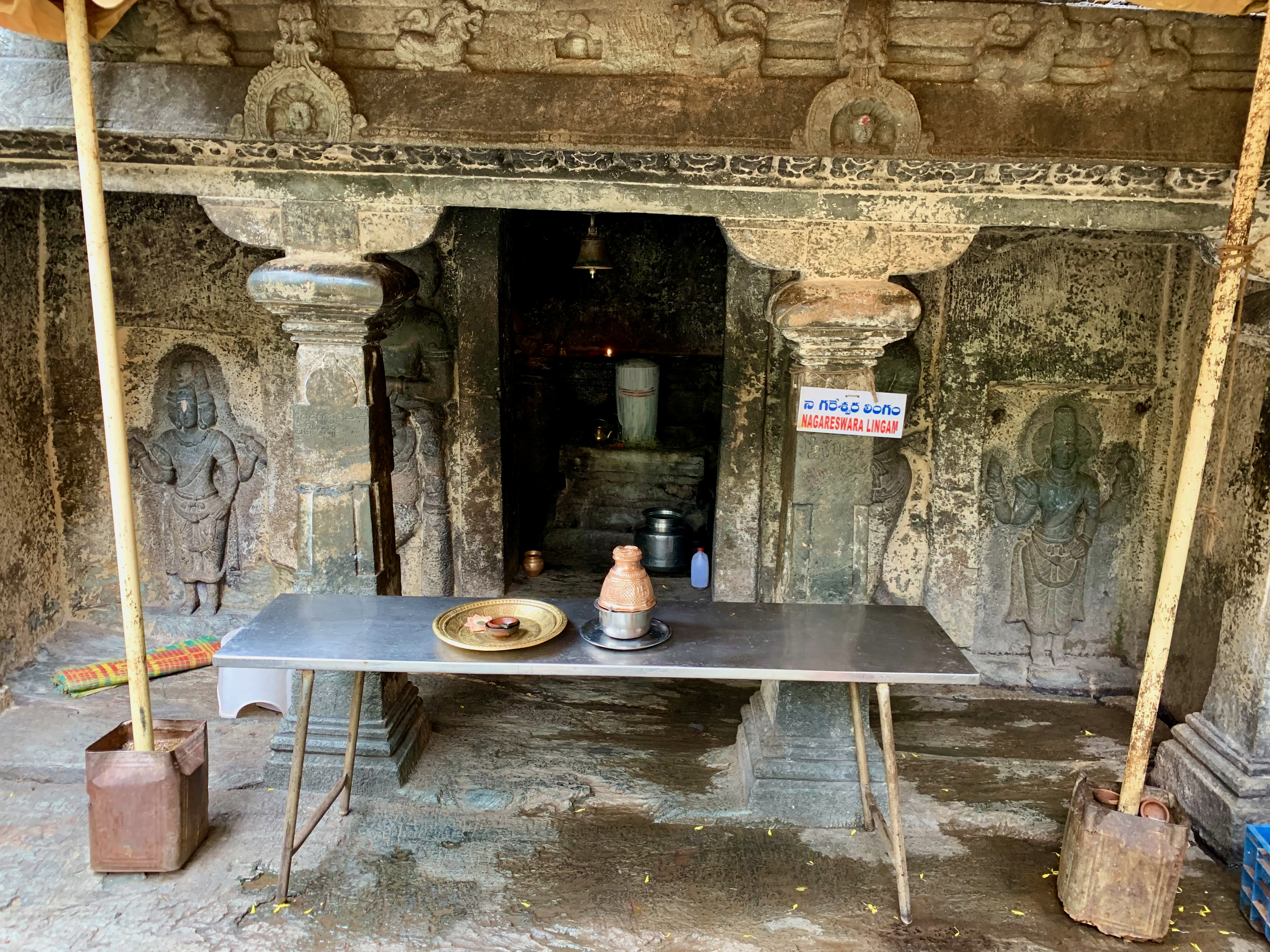
Nagarikeswara lingam

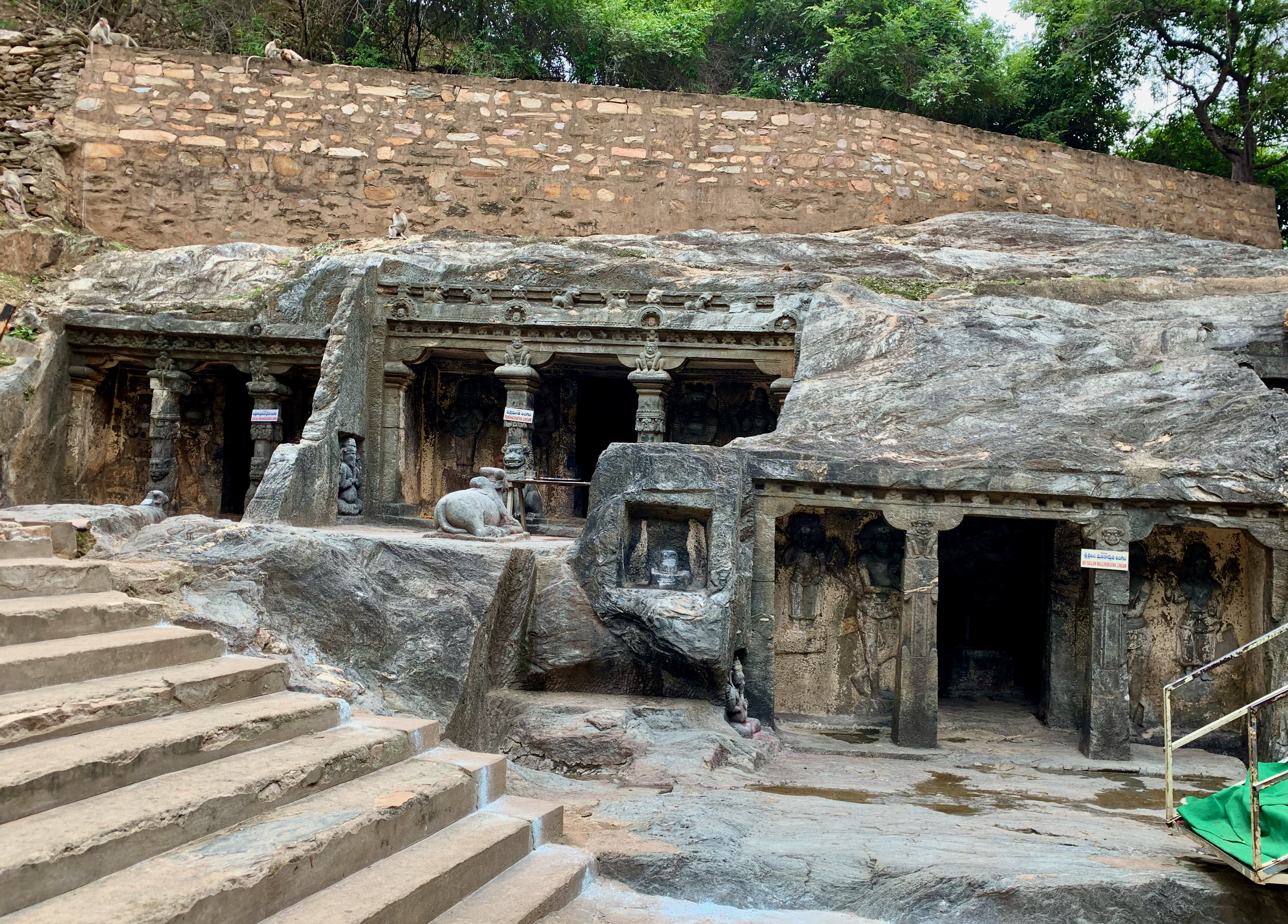
Ashtakala Prachanda Bhairava lingam, Pakshaghatha lingam, Srisaila mallikarjuna lingam cave temples

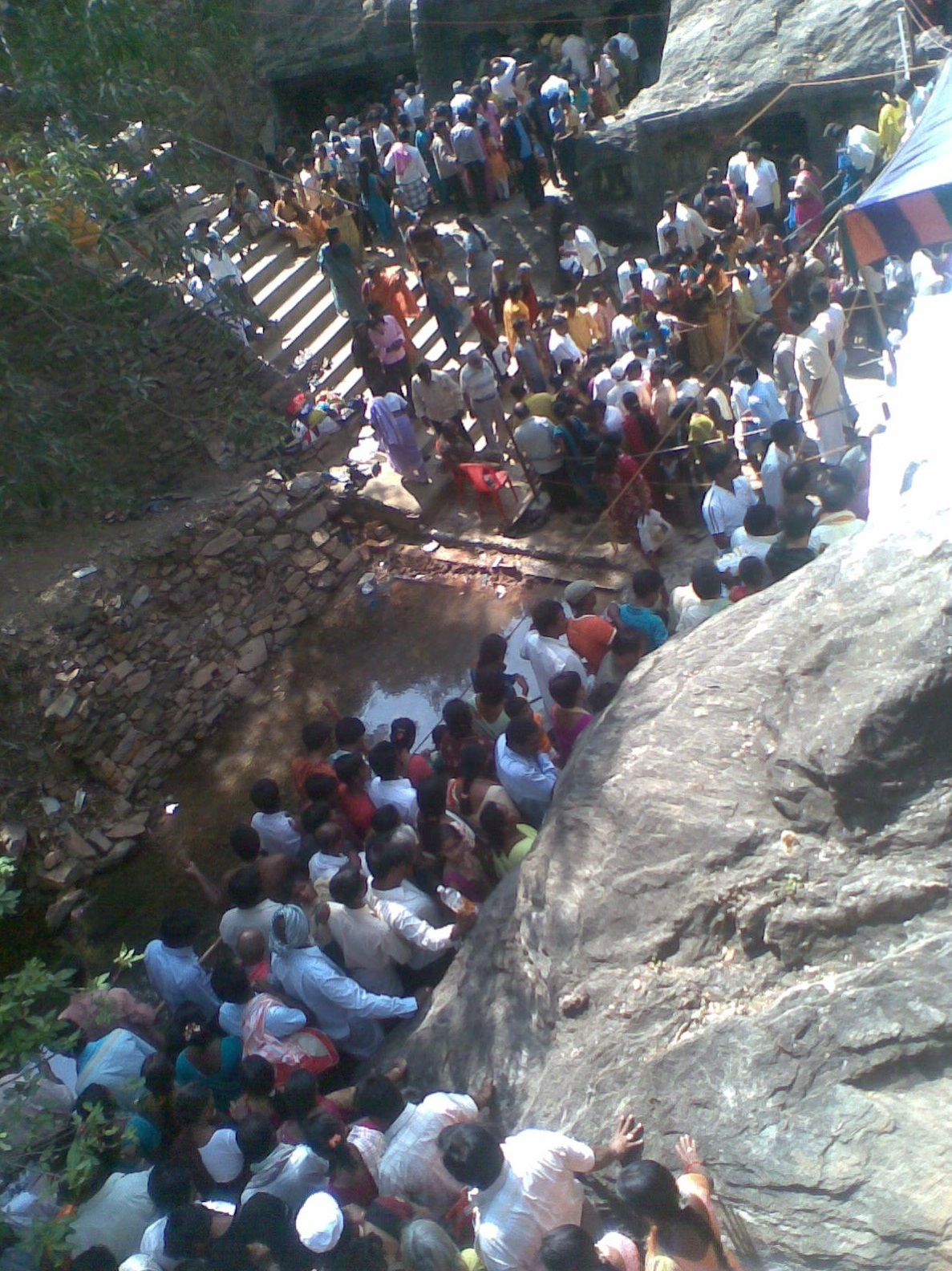
Pilgrims at Bhairavakona
