= Alur Assembly constituency =

Constituency of the Andhra Pradesh Legislative Assembly, India

Coordinates: 15.39°N 77.23°E

Alur
- Constituency No. 147 for the Andhra Pradesh Legislative Assembly
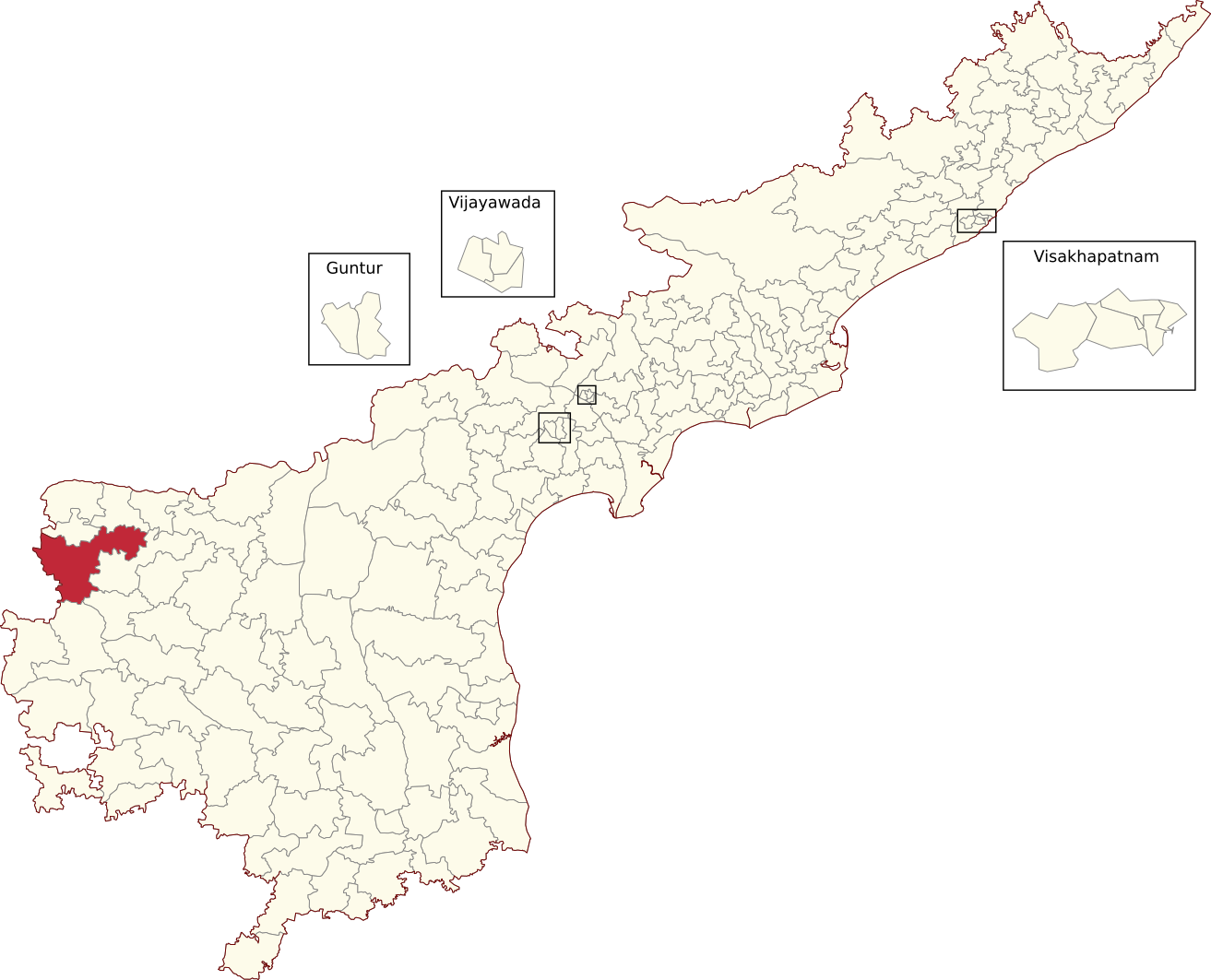
- Location of Alur Assembly constituency within Andhra Pradesh

Constituency details
- Country: India
- Region: South India
- State: Andhra Pradesh
- District: Kurnool
- Lok Sabha constituency: Kurnool
- Established: 1955
- Total electors: 236,098
- Reservation: None

Member of Legislative Assembly
- 16th Andhra Pradesh Legislative Assembly
- Incumbent Busine Virupakshi
- Party: YSRCP
- Elected year: 2024

Alur Assembly constituency is a constituency in Kurnool district of Andhra Pradesh that elects representatives to the Andhra Pradesh Legislative Assembly in India. It is one of the seven assembly segments of Kurnool Lok Sabha constituency.

Busine Virupakshi is the current MLA of the constituency, having won the 2024 Andhra Pradesh Legislative Assembly election from YSR Congress Party. As of 2019, there are a total of 235,064 electors in the constituency. The constituency was established in 1955, as per the Delimitation Orders (1955).

== Mandals ==
Mandal
Devanakonda
Holagunda
Halaharvi
Alur
Aspari
Chippagiri

== Members of the Legislative Assembly ==
Year	Member	Political party
1955	H. Ramalingareddy	Indian National Congress
1962	D. Lakshmikantha Reddy	Indian National Congress
1967	D. Govindadass	Swatantra Party
1972	P. Rajaratna Rao	Indian National Congress
1978	Masala Eranna	Indian National Congress
1983	K. Basappa	Telugu Desam Party
1985	Masala Eranna	Indian National Congress
1987 by-election	M.Rangaiah	Telugu Desam Party
1989	Gudlannagari Loknath	Indian National Congress
1994	Masala Eranna	Telugu Desam Party
1999	Moolinti Mareppa	Indian National Congress
2004	Moolinti Mareppa	Indian National Congress
2009	Patil Neeraja Reddy	Indian National Congress
2014	Gummanur Jayaram	YSR Congress Party
2019	Gummanur Jayaram	YSR Congress Party
2024	Busine Virupakshi	YSR Congress Party

== Election results ==
=== 2004 ===
2004 Andhra Pradesh Legislative Assembly election: Alur
Party	Candidate	Votes	%	±%
INC	Moolinti Mareppa	39,469	49.10	−6.47
TDP	Masala Padmaja	36,332	45.20	+2.19
Majority		3,137	3.90	
Turnout		80,385	60.66	−0.78
INC gain from TDP		Swing		

=== 2009 ===
2009 Andhra Pradesh Legislative Assembly election: Alur
Party	Candidate	Votes	%	±%
INC	Patil Neeraja Reddy	42,621	30.86	−18.24
PRP	Gummanuru Jayaram	37,275	26.99	
CPI	K.Ramakrishna	27,748	20.09	
Majority		5,346	3.87	
Turnout		138,092	70.25	+9.59
INC hold		Swing		

=== 2014 ===
2014 Andhra Pradesh Legislative Assembly election: Alur
Party	Candidate	Votes	%	±%
YSRCP	Gummanur Jayaram	69,466	41.66	
TDP	B.Veerabhadra Gowd	67,547	40.51	
Majority		1,919	1.15	
Turnout		166,743	76.17	+5.92
YSRCP gain from INC		Swing		

=== 2019 ===
2019 Andhra Pradesh Legislative Assembly election: Alur
Party	Candidate	Votes	%	±%
YSRCP	Gummanur Jayaram	107,101	56.57	+14.91
TDP	Kotla Sujathamma	67,205	35.50	−5.01
Majority		39,896	21.20	
Turnout		188,194	79.71	+3.54
YSRCP hold		Swing		

=== 2024 ===
2024 Andhra Pradesh Legislative Assembly election: Alur
Party	Candidate	Votes	%	±%
YSRCP	Busine Virupakshi	100,264	47.65	
TDP	B.Veerabhadra Gowd	97,433	46.30	
INC	Naveen Kishor Arakatla	5,772	2.74	
NOTA	None Of The Above	2,634	1.25	
Majority		2,831	1.35	
Turnout		2,10,429		
YSRCP hold		Swing		

== See also ==
- List of constituencies of Andhra Pradesh Legislative Assembly
