= National Highway 340C (India) =

National highway in India

National Highway 340C
- Map of the National Highway in red

Route information
- Length: 131 km (81 mi)

Major junctions
- West end: Kurnool
- East end: Dornala

Location
- Country: India
- States: Andhra Pradesh

Highway system
- Roads in India; Expressways; National; State; Asian
← NH 40	→ NH 765

National Highway 340C, commonly called NH 340C is a national highway in India. It is a spur road of National Highway 40. NH-340C traverses the state of Andhra Pradesh in India.

== Route ==
Kurnool, Nandikotkur, Atmakur, Dornala.

== Junctions ==
NH 40 Terminal near Kurnool.
NH 765 Terminal near Dornala.

== See also ==
- List of national highways in India
- List of national highways in India by state
