= K. Chennakesava Reddy =

Indian politician

Member of Legislative Assembly Andhra Pradesh
- In office 2019–2024
- Preceded by: B.V. Jayanageswara Reddy
- Succeeded by: B. V. Jayanageswara Reddy
- Constituency: Yemmiganur
- In office 2004–2014
- Preceded by: B.V. Mohan Reddy
- Succeeded by: B. V. Jayanageswara Reddy
- Constituency: Yemmiganur

Personal details
- Born: 1942
- Spouse: K. Rajyalakshmi
- Children: 1 (son)
- Parent: K. Chenna Reddy (father)
- Profession: Professor; Politician

K. Chennakesava Reddy (born 1 July 1942) is an Indian politician from Andhra Pradesh. He is an MLA of the YSR Congress Party from Yemmiganur Assembly constituency in Kurnool district. He won the 2019 Andhra Pradesh Legislative Assembly election.

== Early life and education ==
Reddy is from Yemmiganur, Kurnool district, Andhra Pradesh. He completed his schooling from S.S.L.C High School, Yemmiganur, Kurnool district in 1957. His father Chenna Reddy was a farmer. He was the ex-Director of Sri Venkateswara Veterinary University. He married Raja Lakshmi. He has a son, Jagan Mohan Reddy.

== Career ==
Reddy started his political journey with the Indian National Congress. He served as the vice-chairman of Kurnool Zilla Parishad, Kurnool from 1985 to 1990. He won the 2004 Andhra Pradesh Legislative Assembly election from Yemmiganur Assembly constituency representing the Indian National Congress. He defeated B. V. Mohan Reddy of the Telugu Desam Party by a margin of 18,373 votes. He lost in 1994 and 1999 to B. V. Mohan Reddy of TDP. He retained the Yemmiganur Assembly constituency representing the Congress as he won the 2009 Andhra Pradesh Legislative Assembly election defeating B. V. Mohan Reddy of the Telugu Desam Party by a narrow margin of 2,323 votes. He later joined YSR Congress Party and contested the 2012 Andhra Pradesh by-election. He won the byelection defeating B. V. Mohan Reddy of the Telugu Desam Party by a margin of 20,103 votes. He then missed the 2014 election but regained the seat winning the 2019 Andhra Pradesh Legislative Assembly election, representing the YSR Congress once again, defeating B. V. Jaya Nageshwara Reddy of the Telugu Desam Party by a margin of 25,610 votes. He also served as Mandal President and Council Member of Andhra Pradesh State Road Transport Corporation. In July 2021, he demanded the government's revocation of the 'Cow Protection Act'.
