= National Highway 765 (India) =

National highway in India

National Highway 765
- Map of the National Highway in red

Route information
- Length: 270 km (170 mi)

Major junctions
- North end: NH 44 in Hyderabad, Telangana
- NH 167 in Kalwakurthy, Telangana; NH 340C in Dornala, Andhra Pradesh
- South end: NH 544D / NH 565 in Kunta, Andhra Pradesh

Location
- Country: India
- States: Telangana, Andhra Pradesh
- Primary destinations: Hyderabad, Kalwakurthy, Srisailam, Dornala

Highway system
- Roads in India; Expressways; National; State; Asian
← NH 565	→ NH 765D

National Highway 765 (NH 765), is a National Highway in India, which was formed as a new National Highway by up-gradation and passes through the states of Telangana and Andhra Pradesh. It starts at Hyderabad of Telangana and ends at Tokapelle road of Andhra Pradesh.

== Route ==
It starts at the junction of Hyderabad of Telangana and passes through Kalwakurthy, Srisailam, Dornala and ends at Tokapelle road in Andhra Pradesh.

State–wise route length (in km.)

- Telangana – 192.00 km (119.30 mi)
- Andhra Pradesh – 78.00 km (48.47 mi)

== See also ==
- List of national highways in India
- List of national highways in India by state
