= Markapur Road railway station =

Railway station in Andhra Pradesh, India

Markapuram Road

General information
- Location: Markapuram, Markapuram district, Andhra Pradesh; India
- Coordinates: 15°44′N 79°16′E
- System: Commuter, Inter-city and Regional rail station
- Owner: Indian Railways
- Operator: Indian Railways
- Line: Nallapadu–Nandyal section
- Platforms: 2
- Tracks: 5 ft 6 in (1,676 mm) broad gauge

Construction
- Structure type: Standard (on ground)
- Accessible: Disabled access

Other information
- Status: Active
- Station code: MRK
- Zone(s): SCoR
- Division(s): Guntur

History
- Electrified: 2017

Services
| Preceding station | Indian Railways | Following station |
|---|---|---|
| Gajjelakonda towards ? | Nallapadu–Nandyal section | Tarlupadu towards ? |
Route map
Location
- Location within Andhra Pradesh Location within India

Markapuram Road railway station (station code: MRK), is an Indian Railway station in Markapur of Markapuram district in Andhra Pradesh. It is situated on Nallapadu–Nandyal section and is administered by Guntur railway division of South Coast Railway zone. Electrification on Nallapadu–Cumbum part, where Markapur Road is located has been commissioned in 2017. It is one of the important station for the pilgrims of Srisailam and is selected as one of the station to be developed under Adarsh station scheme.

== See also ==
- List of railway stations in India
