= National Highway 167BG (India) =

National Highway in India

National Highway 167BG
- Map of the National Highway in red

Route information
- Auxiliary route of NH 67
- Length: 104.4 km (64.9 mi)

Major junctions
- West end: Seetharamapuram
- East end: Kavali

Location
- Country: India
- States: Andhra Pradesh

Highway system
- Roads in India; Expressways; National; State; Asian
← NH 167B	→ NH 16

National Highway 167BG, commonly referred to as NH 167BG is a national highway in India. It is a secondary route of National Highway 67. NH-167BG runs in the state of Andhra Pradesh in India.

== Route ==
NH167BG starts with it Junction with NH167B at Seetharamapuram, Udayagiri, Duttalur and terminating at its junction with NH16 at Kavali in the state of Andhra Pradesh.

== Junctions ==
NH 167B Terminal near Seetharamapuram.
NH 565 near Duttalur
NH 16 Terminal near Kavali.

== See also ==
- List of national highways in India
- List of national highways in India by state
