= Hanumanthunipadu =

- Village
- Interactive map of Hanumanthunipadu
- Location in Andhra Pradesh, India Hanumanthunipadu (India)
- Coordinates: 15.46038°N 79.40638°E
- Country: India
- State: Andhra Pradesh
- District: Markapuram
- Mandal: Hanumanthunipadu

Languages
  - Official: Telugu
- Time zone: UTC+5:30 (IST)
- PIN: 523228
- Telephone code: +91–8402
- Vehicle registration: AP

Hanumanthunipadu is a village in the Markapuram district of the Indian state of Andhra Pradesh. It is the headquarters of Hanumanthunipadu mandal (administrative centre) in Kanigiri revenue division.
