= Pullalacheruvu =

- Village
- Interactive map of Pullalacheruvu
- Location in Andhra Pradesh, India Pullalacheruvu (India)
- Coordinates: 16°09′32″N 79°23′55″E
- Country: India
- State: Andhra Pradesh
- District: Markapuram
- Mandal: Pullalacheruvu

Area
  - Total: 35.93 km^{2} (13.87 sq mi)

Population (2011)
  - Total: 8,861
  - Density: 246.6/km^{2} (638.7/sq mi)

Languages
  - Official: Telugu
- Time zone: UTC+5:30 (IST)
- Vehicle registration: AP

Pullalacheruvu is a village in Markapuram district of the Indian state of Andhra Pradesh. It is the mandal headquarters of Pullalacheruvu mandal in Markapur revenue division.
