= Busine Virupakshi =

Indian politician

Member of Legislative Assembly Andhra Pradesh
- Incumbent
- Assumed office 2024
- Preceded by: Gummanur Jayaram
- Constituency: Alur

Personal details
- Born: 4 March 1969 (age 57)
- Party: YSR Congress Party

Chippagiri Busine Virupakshi (born 4 March 1969) is an Indian politician from Andhra Pradesh. He is an MLA from Alur Assembly constituency in Kurnool district, representing the YSR Congress Party. He won the 2024 Andhra Pradesh Legislative Assembly election.

== Early life and education ==
Virupakshi was born to Busine Chinanjaneya and Busine Sridevi and was raised in Chippagiri village in Kurnool district. His father, Chinanjaneya, was a farmer. He studied at the Zilla Parishad high school in Chippagiri but only up to Class 9. He handled Railway contracts and began as a Railway supervisor.

== Political career ==
Virupakshi started his political journey as a ZPTC member from Kurnool. He won the 2024 Andhra Pradesh Legislative Assembly election from Alur Assembly constituency representing the YSR Congress Party. He polled 1,00,264 votes and defeated his nearest rival B. Veerabhadra Gowd of the Telugu Desam Party by a margin on 2,831 votes.
