= Veligandla =

- Village
- Interactive map of Veligandla
- Location in Andhra Pradesh, India Veligandla (India)
- Coordinates: 15.341575°N 79.345511°E
- Country: India
- State: Andhra Pradesh
- District: Markapuram
- Mandal: Veligandla

Languages
  - Official: Telugu
- Time zone: UTC+5:30 (IST)
- PIN: 523224
- Vehicle registration: AP

Veligandla is a village in Markapuram district of the Indian state of Andhra Pradesh. It is located in Veligandla mandal in Kanigiri revenue division.
