= Mannanur, Nagarkurnool =

Village in Telangana, India

Mannanur మన్ననూర్
- Village
- Country: India
- State: Telangana
- District: Nagarkurnool
- Time zone: UTC+5:30 (IST)
- PIN: 509201

Mannanur (మన్ననూర్) is a village in Nagarkurnool, Telangana, India.

== History ==
On 23 July 2023, archaeologist E Sivanagireddy and other historians found quarries from the 12th century. Sivanagireddy urged residents of the village to preserve the quarries and turn them into a tourist attraction.

== Transport ==
The village is served by the National Highway 765 that passes the village to Hyderabad.
