= Takkellapadu, Kanigiri mandal =

Village in Andhra Pradesh, India

Takkellapadu is a village in Kanigiri mandal, Markapuram district, Andhra Pradesh, India. It is located between Kanigiri and Pamuru, in India. Takkellapadu consist of three colonies named Kancharalavaripalli (post), Vijaya Gopalapuram, and Narapareddyvaripalli, B.C colony.
