= Yemmiganur Assembly constituency =

Constituency of the Andhra Pradesh Legislative Assembly, India

Coordinates: 15.76°N 77.48°E

Yemmiganur
- Constituency No. 144 for the Andhra Pradesh Legislative Assembly
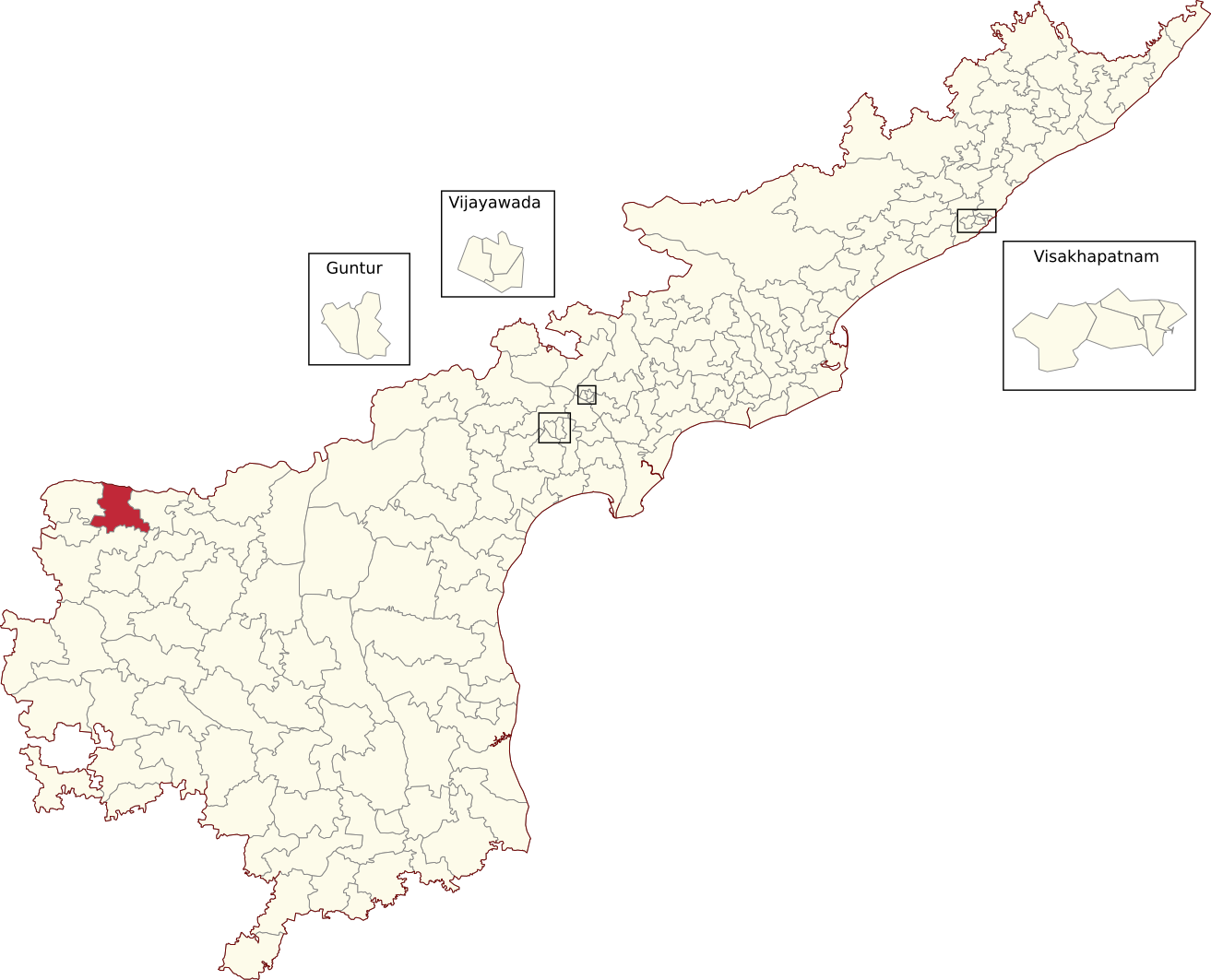
- Location of Yemmiganur Assembly constituency within Andhra Pradesh

Constituency details
- Country: India
- Region: South India
- State: Andhra Pradesh
- District: Kurnool
- Lok Sabha constituency: Kurnool
- Established: 1955
- Total electors: 227,253
- Reservation: None

Member of Legislative Assembly
- 16th Andhra Pradesh Legislative Assembly
- Incumbent Byreddy Jaya Nageswara Reddy
- Party: TDP
- Alliance: NDA
- Elected year: 2024

Yemmiganur Assembly constituency is a constituency in Kurnool district of Andhra Pradesh that elects representatives to the Andhra Pradesh Legislative Assembly in India. It is one of the seven assembly segments of Kurnool Lok Sabha constituency.

Byreddy Jaya Nageswara Reddy is the current MLA of the constituency, having won the 2024 Andhra Pradesh Legislative Assembly election from Telugu Desam Party. As of 25 March 2019, there are a total of 227,253 electors in the constituency. The constituency was established in 1955, as per the Delimitation Orders (1955).

== Mandals ==
Mandal
Nandavaram
Yemmiganur
Gonegandla

== Members of the Legislative Assembly ==
| Year | Member | Political party |
|---|---|---|
| 1955 | D. Sanjeevayya | Indian National Congress |
| 1962 | Y. C. Veerabhadra Gowd | Swatantra Party |
| 1967 | P. O. Sathyanarayana Raju | Indian National Congress |
| 1972 | P. O. Sathyanarayana Raju | Indian National Congress |
| 1978 | Hanumantha Reddy | Indian National Congress |
| 1983 | Kotla Vijaya Bhaskara Reddy | Indian National Congress |
| 1983 by-election | B. V. Mohan Reddy | Telugu Desam Party |
| 1985 | B. V. Mohan Reddy | Telugu Desam Party |
| 1989 | B. V. Mohan Reddy | Telugu Desam Party |
| 1994 | B. V. Mohan Reddy | Telugu Desam Party |
| 1999 | B. V. Mohan Reddy | Telugu Desam Party |
| 2004 | K. Chennakesava Reddy | Indian National Congress |
| 2009 | K. Chennakesava Reddy | Indian National Congress |
| 2012 | K. Chennakesava Reddy | YSR Congress Party |
| 2014 | Byreddy Jaya Nageswara Reddy | Telugu Desam Party |
| 2019 | K. Chennakesava Reddy | YSR Congress Party |
| 2024 | Byreddy Jaya Nageswara Reddy | Telugu Desam Party |

== Election results ==
=== 2004 ===
2004 Andhra Pradesh Legislative Assembly election: Yemmiganur
| Party | Candidate | Votes | % | ±% |
|---|---|---|---|---|
| INC | K.Chennakesava Reddy | 78,586 | 54.36 | +11.56 |
| TDP | B. V. Mohan Reddy | 60,213 | 41.65 | −13.93 |
| Majority | | 18,373 | 12.71 | |
| Turnout | | 144,567 | 66.37 | −2.21 |
| INC gain from TDP | | Swing | | |

=== 2009 ===
2009 Andhra Pradesh Legislative Assembly election: Yemmiganur
| Party | Candidate | Votes | % | ±% |
|---|---|---|---|---|
| INC | K.Chenna Kesava Reddy | 53,766 | 41.77 | −12.59 |
| TDP | B. V. Mohan Reddy | 51,443 | 39.96 | −1.69 |
| PRP | Vagaruru Lakshmikantha Reddy | 16,638 | 12.93 | |
| Majority | | 2,323 | 1.81 | |
| Turnout | | 128,723 | 68.01 | +1.64 |
| INC hold | | Swing | | |

=== 2012 ===
2012 Andhra Pradesh Legislative Assembly by-election: Yemmiganur
| Party | Candidate | Votes | % | ±% |
|---|---|---|---|---|
| YSRCP | K Chennakesava Reddy | 64,155 | 42.08 | |
| TDP | B. V. Mohan Reddy | 44,052 | 28.88 | |
| Majority | | 20,103 | 13.2 | |
| Turnout | | 152,508 | | |
| YSRCP gain from INC | | Swing | | |

=== 2014 ===
2014 Andhra Pradesh Legislative Assembly election: Yemmiganur
| Party | Candidate | Votes | % | ±% |
|---|---|---|---|---|
| TDP | Byreddy Jaya Nageswara Reddy | 84,483 | 50.67 | |
| YSRCP | K Jagan Mohan Reddy | 70,122 | 42.05 | |
| Majority | | 14,365 | 8.62 | |
| Turnout | | 166,744 | 74.75 | +6.74 |
| TDP gain from YSRCP | | Swing | | |

=== 2019 ===
2019 Andhra Pradesh Legislative Assembly election: Yemmiganur
| Party | Candidate | Votes | % | ±% |
|---|---|---|---|---|
| YSRCP | K Chennakesava Reddy | 96,498 | 53.28 | +11.23 |
| TDP | Byreddy Jaya Nageswara Reddy | 70,888 | 39.14 | −11.53 |
| Majority | | 25,610 | 14.14 | |
| Turnout | | 181,121 | 79.15 | +4.4 |
| YSRCP gain from TDP | | Swing | | |

=== 2024 ===
2024 Andhra Pradesh Legislative Assembly election: Yemmiganur
| Party | Candidate | Votes | % | ±% |
|---|---|---|---|---|
| TDP | Byreddy Jaya Nageswara Reddy | 103,089 | 50.76 | |
| YSRCP | Butta Renuka | 87,252 | 42.96 | |
| INC | M.KHASIM VALI | 7,831 | 3.86 | |
| NOTA | None Of The Above | 2380 | 1.17 | |
| Majority | | 15,837 | 7.80 | |
| Turnout | | 2,03,089 | | |
| TDP gain from YSRCP | | Swing | | |

== See also ==
- List of constituencies of Andhra Pradesh Legislative Assembly
