= Kanigiri revenue division =

Revenue division in Markapuram district, Andhra Pradesh, India

- revenue division in Markapuram district
- Country: India
- State: Andhra Pradesh
- District: Markapur
- Formed: 4 April 2022
- Founder: Government of Andhra Pradesh
- Time zone: UTC+05:30 (IST)

Kanigiri revenue division is an administrative division in the Markapuram district of the Indian state of Andhra Pradesh. It is one of the two revenue divisions in the district and comprises 6 mandals. It was formed on 4 April 2022 by the Government of Andhra Pradesh.

== Administration ==
The revenue division comprises 6 mandals: Chandrasekharapuram, Hanumanthunipadu, Kanigiri, Pamuru, Pedacherlopalli and Veligandla.
