= Markapuram revenue division =

Coordinates: 15°54′N 80°40′E

- revenue division in Markapuram district
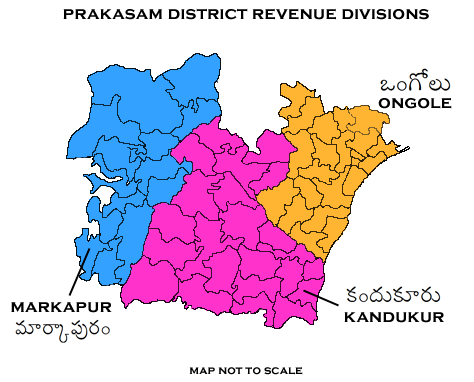
- Markapuram revenue division in erst while Prakasam district
- Country: India
- State: Andhra Pradesh
- District: Markapuram
- Headquarters: Markapuram

Markapuram revenue division is an administrative division in the Markapuram district of the Indian state of Andhra Pradesh. It is one of the 2 revenue divisions in the district which consists of 15 mandals under its administration. Markapuram is the administrative headquarters of the division.

== Administration ==
The 15 mandals in the revenue division include:

No.	Mandals
1	Markapuram mandal
2	Giddaluru mandal
3	Bestavaripeta mandal
4	Racherla mandal
5	Komarolu mandal
6	Cumbum mandal
7	Ardhaveedu mandal
8	Yerragondapalem mandal
9	Pullalacheruvu mandal
10	Tripuranthakam mandal
11	Dornala mandal
12	Pedda Araveedu mandal
13	Tarlupadu mandal
14	Podili mandal
15	Konakanamitla mandal

== See also ==
- List of revenue divisions in Andhra Pradesh
- List of mandals in Andhra Pradesh
