= Ardhaveedu =

- Village
- Interactive map of Ardhaveedu
- Location in Andhra Pradesh, India
- Coordinates: 15.6833°N 78.9667°E
- Country: India
- State: Andhra Pradesh
- District: Markapuram
- Mandal: Ardhaveedu

Area
  - Total: 23.60 km^{2} (9.11 sq mi)

Population (2011)
  - Total: 6,572
  - Density: 278.5/km^{2} (721.2/sq mi)

Languages
  - Official: Telugu
- Time zone: UTC+5:30 (IST)
- PIN: 523335
- Vehicle registration: AP

Ardhaveedu is a village in Markapuram district of the Indian state of Andhra Pradesh. It is the mandal headquarters of Ardhaveedu mandal in Markapur revenue division.

== Geography ==
Donakonda is located at 15.6833°N 78.9667°E.
