= Pamuru mandal =

- Mandal
- Pamur mandal
- Interactive Map Outlining mandal
- Location in Andhra Pradesh, India
- Coordinates: 15.097°N 79.409°E
- Country: India
- State: Andhra Pradesh
- District: Markapuram
- Headquarters: Pamur

Population (2011)
  - Total: 63,017

Languages
  - Official: Telugu
- Time zone: UTC+5:30 (IST)

Pamuru mandal is a sub-district in the Markapuram district, Andhra Pradesh, India. Its headquarters are in Pamur.

== Demographics ==
Religions in Pamuru mandal (2011)
Religion	Percent
Hinduism	89.74%
Islam	9.55%
Other or not stated	0.71%
Distribution of religions

As of the 2011 census, the mandal had a population of 63,017 in 14,897 households. The total population constituted 32,206 males and 30,811 females — a sex ratio of 957 females per 1000 males. 7,678 children were in the age group of 0–6 years, of which 4,007 were boys and 3,671 were girls — a sex ratio of 916 per 1000. The average literacy rate stood at 67.77% with 37,503 literates. 31.74% of the population lives in urban areas, namely Pamur. Scheduled Castes and Scheduled Tribes make up 11,778 (18.69%) and 1,992 (3.16%) of the population respectively.

Languages of Pamuru mandal (2011)
1. Telugu (92.3%)
2. Urdu (7.28%)
3. Others (0.45%)

At the time of the 2011 census, 92.27% of the population spoke Telugu and 7.28% Urdu as their first language.
