= Ganapavaram, Markapuram district =

Ganapavaram
- Village
- Interactive map of Ganapavaram
- Location in Andhra Pradesh, India Ganapavaram (India)
- Coordinates: 16°02′08″N 79°28′32″E
- Country: India
- State: Andhra Pradesh
- District: Markapuram

Population (2008)
  - Total: 1,000

Languages
  - Official: Telugu
- Time zone: UTC+5:30 (IST)
- PIN: 523326
- Vehicle registration: AP27
- Sex ratio: 1:1 ♂/♀

Ganapavaram is a village in Tripurantakam mandal, located in Markapuram district of Andhra Pradesh, India.

== Geography ==
Ganapavaram is located at 16.0421015°N 79.5100737°E.
