= Giddaluru =

- Town - Municipal Council
- Location in Andhra Pradesh, India Giddaluru (India)
- Coordinates: 15.3764°N 78.9251°E
- Country: India
- State: Andhra Pradesh
- District: Markapuram
- Mandal: Giddaluru

Government
  - Body: Giddaluru Municipality

Area
  - Total: 31.57 km^{2} (12.19 sq mi)

Population (2011)
  - Total: 35,150
  - Density: 1,113/km^{2} (2,884/sq mi)

Languages
  - Official: Telugu
- Time zone: UTC+5:30 (IST)
- PIN: 523357
- Telephone code: +91–8405
- Vehicle registration: AP 27 / AP 39

Giddaluru is a town in the Markapuram district of the Indian state of Andhra Pradesh. It is the mandal headquarters of the Giddaluru mandal in Markapur revenue division. It was part of kurnool district till 1969. Later, it was merged into Prakasam district in 1970. Till 2008, it was under Nandyal parliament segment and after delimitation, it was moved to Ongole MP segment.

Giddalur is also known as "3 zilla la muddu bidda " because during the Britishers rule it was in kadapa district, later moved to kurnool then in 1970 it was merged in prakasam district. Giddalur is the only constituency in coastal districts which has Rayalseema culture, slang and traditions. Giddalur town has good transport connectivity to Nandyal, Markapuram, Podili, Ongole, Kurnool, Kadapa.

== Geography ==
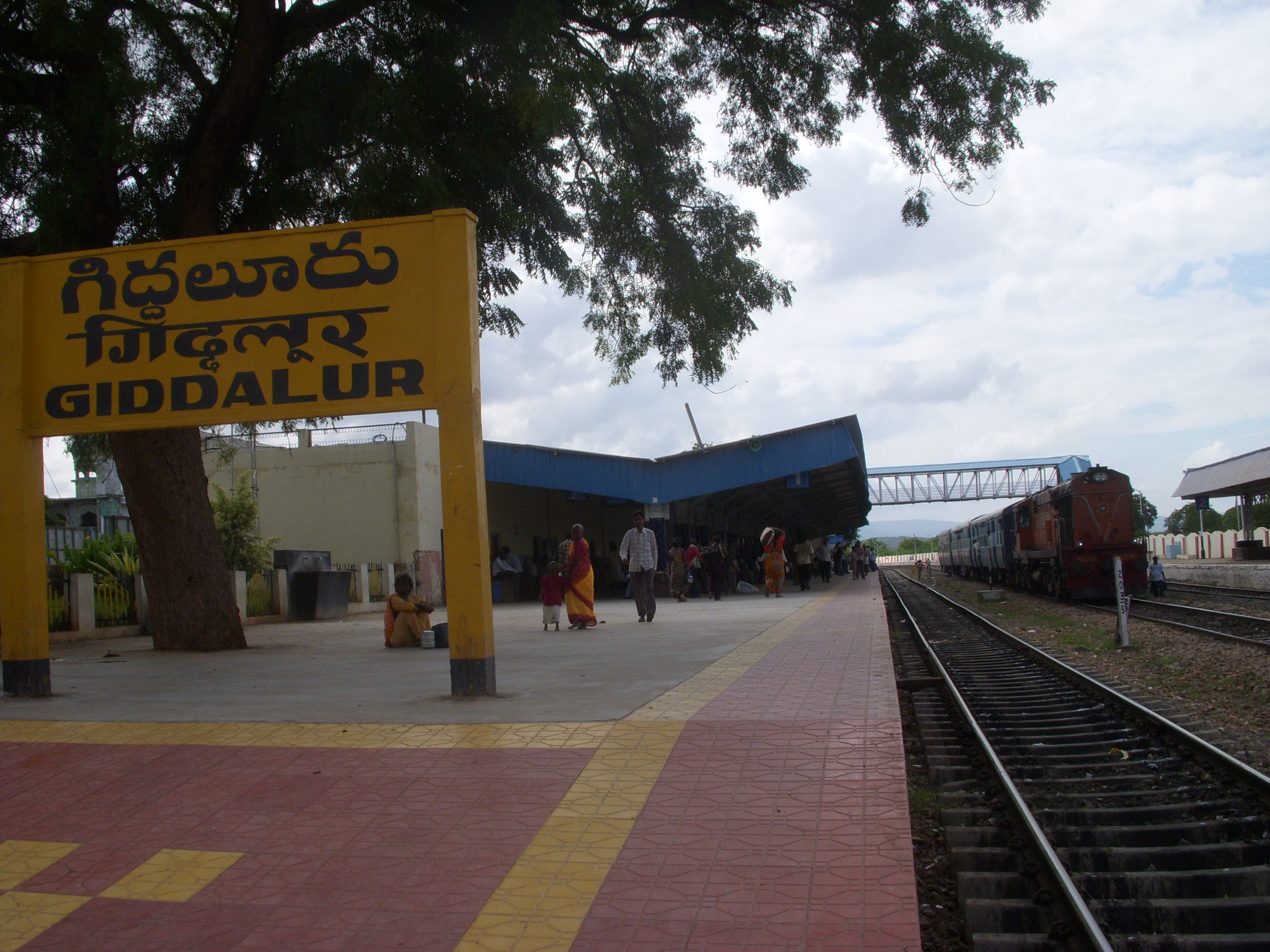
Giddalur Railway Station

Giddaluru is located at 15.3500°N 78.9167°E, and is surrounded by the Nallamala Forest in southern India.

== Demographics ==
As of 2011, Giddaluru has a population of 35,150, including 17,728 men and 17,422 women, and children between the ages of 0 and 6 make up 9.8% of the total population. The literacy rate of Giddaluru city is 79.71%, which is higher than the state average of 67.02%.

The majority of inhabitants practice Hinduism (80.78% of the population as of 2011), though Giddaluru also has a sizable Muslim population (17.5% in 2011) and much smaller Christian and Sikh Minorities.

== Education ==
Primary and secondary education are governed by the School Education Department. There are a total of 61,128 schools within 13 districts. These include 46,137 Government Schools, 2,302 Aided Schools, and 12,689 Private Schools. There are two primary languages taught during instruction: English and Telugu. Schools in the locality and nearby areas include AP Model School Racherla, Sri Vidwan Public School, and Kasturba schools.

== Transport ==
Giddaluru is located on the Ananthapur–Amaravati Express Highway, a section of the Expressway Project. It is 141 km (88 mi) away from Ongole, 91 km (57 mi) away from Podili, and Nandyal is 60 km (37 mi) away on the other side of Nallamala hills.

Giddaluru railway station is a part of the Guntur division of South Coast Railway zone division. The railway line from Vijayawada to Guntakal passes through this station.

== Sports ==
Giddaluru is known for its strong volleyball and kabaddi teams.cricket teams.
