= Gummanur Jayaram =

Indian politician (born 1968)

P. Gummanur Jayaram

Member of Legislative Assembly Andhra Pradesh
- Incumbent
- Assumed office 4 June 2024
- Preceded by: Y. Venkatarama Reddy
- Constituency: Guntakal
- In office 2 June 2014 – 5 March 2024
- Preceded by: Patil Neeraja Reddy
- Succeeded by: B. Virupakshi
- Constituency: Aluru

Former Minister of Labour, Employment & Factories Government of Andhra Pradesh
- In office 30 May 2019 – 5 March 2024
- Governor: ▪︎ E. S. L. Narasimhan; ▪︎ Biswabhusan Harichandan; ▪︎ S. Abdul Nazeer
- Chief Minister: Y. S. Jagan Mohan Reddy
- Preceded by: Pithani Satyanarayana

Personal details
- Born: 16 October 1968 (age 57) Gummanur village, Kurnool, Andhra Pradesh, India
- Party: Telugu Desam Party
- Other political affiliations: YSR Congress Party (2011-2024); Praja Rajyam Party (2009-2011)
- Spouse: Gummanur Renuka (m. 1989)
- Children: 5
- Education: Municipal Boys High School, Bellary, Karnataka

Gummanur Jayaram (born 16 October 1968) is an Indian politician from Telugu Desam Party and formerly a member of YSR Party and Minister of Labour, Employment, Training, Factories in the Government of Andhra Pradesh. He was elected as a Member of the AP Legislative Assembly (India) (MLA) representing Alur (Assembly constituency) in both the 2014 Andhra Pradesh Legislative Assembly election and 2019 Andhra Pradesh Legislative Assembly elections.

== Political career ==
=== 2019 Election ===
In 2019 election, Jayaram contested again as MLA representing YSRCP from Alur against Kotla Sujathamma from TDP. He won with total votes of 107,101 with 161 Postal and 106940 General representing 56%. With a statewide majority by the YSRCP, they formed the state government headed by Jagan Mohan Reddy as CM, and Jayaram was chosen as Minister of Labour, Employment, Training, Factories in Jagan's cabinet.

=== 2024 Election ===
Jayaram was fired from his ministry as he joined hands with Telugu Desam Party without resigning his post. He remains the only minister to be fired from his position in the history of bifurcated Andhra Pradesh.

== Development projects ==
Jayaram led a project bringing water channels to his constituency. He also addressed the problem in labour department, and worked with the Central Government to deliver the upcoming hospital where MoS Santosh Kumar Gangwar laid the foundation stone of the ESI Hospital in Kakinada, Andhra Pradesh.
