= National Highway 150 (India) =

National highway in India

National Highway 150
- Map of National Highway 150 in red

Route information
- Length: 269 km (167 mi)

Major junctions
- From: SOLAPUR
- To: Devasuguru

Location
- Country: India
- States: MAHARASHTRA - KARNATAKA

Highway system
- Roads in India; Expressways; National; State; Asian
← NH 50	→ NH 167

National Highway 150 (NH 150) is a National Highway in India. This is highway runs from SOLAPUR to Devasuguru in the Indian state of Karnataka.

== Route ==
Solapur, Akkalkote, Dhudhani, Afzalpur, Chowdapur, Kalburgi(Gulbarga), Shahabad(Bhankur), Wadi, Yadgir, Krishna.

== See also ==
- List of state highways in Karnataka
- List of national highways in India
- National Highways Development Project
