= Mannanur, Palakkad =

Mannanur
- village
- Location in Kerala, India Mannanur (India)
- Coordinates: 10°44′57″N 76°19′25″E
- Country: India
- State: Kerala
- District: Palakkad

Area
  - Total: 3.2 km^{2} (1.2 sq mi)

Population
  - Total: 8,000
  - Density: 2,500/km^{2} (6,500/sq mi)

Languages
  - Official: Malayalam, English
- Time zone: UTC+5:30 (IST)
- Vehicle registration: KL-
- Nearest city: Ottapalam
- Lok Sabha constituency: Previously Ottapalam. Now Palakkad

Mannanur is a village on the banks of Bharathappuzha river in Palakkad district of Kerala state in India.
