= Nidamanur mandal =

Nidamanoor
- Mandal
- Location in Telangana, India Nidamanoor (India)
- Coordinates: 16°53′22″N 79°21′10″E
- Country: India
- State: Telangana
- District: Nalgonda

Area
  - Total: 271.34 km^{2} (104.76 sq mi)

Population (2011)
  - Total: 53,816
  - Density: 198.33/km^{2} (513.68/sq mi)

Languages
  - Official: Telugu
- Time zone: UTC+5:30 (IST)
- Vehicle registration: TS
- Website: telangana.gov.in

Nidamanoor is one of the 33 mandals in Nalgonda district of the Indian state of Telangana. It is under the administration of Miryalaguda revenue division. It comes under left canal of Nagarjuna Sagar Dam.

Nidamanoor is Taluka Headquarter of Nagarjuna Sagar Assembly Constituency (Old Chalakurthy Constituency).

It consists of 19 villages including itself.
