= Ganapavaram, Nadendla mandal =

Ganapavaram
- Village
- Interactive map of Ganapavaram
- Location in Andhra Pradesh, India
- Coordinates: 16°7′24.01″N 80°10′19.64″E
- Country: India
- State: Andhra Pradesh
- District: Palnadu
- Mandal: Nadendla

Government
  - Type: Panchayati raj
  - Body: Ganapavaram gram panchayat

Area
  - Total: 1,860 ha (4,600 acres)

Population (2011)
  - Total: 21,457
  - Density: 1,150/km^{2} (2,990/sq mi)

Languages
  - Official: Telugu
- Time zone: UTC+5:30 (IST)
- PIN: 522619
- Area code: +91–8647
- Vehicle registration: AP

Ganapavaram is a village in Palnadu district of the Indian state of Andhra Pradesh. It is located in Nadendla mandal of Narasaraopet revenue division.

== Governance ==
Ganapavaram gram panchayat is the local self-government of the village. It is divided into wards and each ward is represented by a ward member.

== Education ==
As per the school information report for the academic year 2018–19, the village has a total of 14 schools. These include 4 private and 12 Zilla Parishad/MPP schools.
