= Kosigi =

- Village
- Interactive map of Kosigi
- Location in Andhra Pradesh, India Kosigi (India)
- Coordinates: 15.8500°N 77.2667°E
- Country: India
- State: Andhra Pradesh
- District: Kurnool
- Elevation: 398 m (1,306 ft)

Languages
  - Official: Telugu
- Time zone: UTC+5:30 (IST)
- PIN: 518313

Kosigi is a village and mandal headquarters of Kosigi mandal in the Kurnool district of Andhra Pradesh, India. In addition to Telugu, Kannada is spoken and understood by many of its residents. Kosigi is well connected through the Mumbai-Chennai rail route, and has a railway station constructed well before India became independent. Kosigi was well known for its leather industry. Kosigi Mandal has a population of 68001 of which males 34,072 and females are 33,929. Kosigi village has 23126 people according to the census 2011. Major cast in this area is VALMIKI boyas.

== Geography ==
Kosigi is located at 15.8500°N 77.2667°E. It has an average elevation of 398 meters (1309 feet).
