= National Highway 765D (India) =

National highway in India

National Highway 765D
- Map of National Highway 765D in red

Route information
- Auxiliary route of NH 65
- Length: 160.00 km (99.42 mi)

Major junctions
- South end: ORR, Hyderabad
- gummadidala toll gate
- North end: Rudrur,Near Bodhan

Location
- Country: India
- States: Telangana

Highway system
- Roads in India; Expressways; National; State; Asian

National Highway 765D, commonly referred to as NH 765D, is a national highway in India. NH-765D traverses the state of Telangana in India.

== Route ==
Hyderabad (junction at outer ring road) - Narsapur - Medak-yellareddy-Banswada-varni- Rudrur.

== Junctions ==
ORR, Hyderabad, Terminal near Gandimaisamma.
NH 161AA Terminal near Narsapur.

== Project development ==
Union minister for Ministry of Road Transport and Highways laid the foundation stone for double laning of national highway NH765D on 5 May 2018. Development of Hyderabad, ORR to Medak section of 62.92 km stretch is estimated to cost Rs 426.52 crores.

== See also ==
- List of national highways in India
- List of national highways in India by state
