= Halaharvi =

Halaharvi Aaluru
- Revenue Village
- Interactive map of Halaharvi
- Location in Andhra Pradesh, India Halaharvi (India)
- Coordinates: 15°19′55″N 77°09′25″E
- Country: India
- State: Andhra Pradesh
- District: Kurnool
- Talukas: Halaharvi

Population (2011)
  - Total: 7,004

Languages
  - Official: Telugu
- Time zone: UTC+5:30 (IST)
- PIN: 518348
- Telephone code: 08523-249135
- Vehicle registration: AP

Halaharvi is a village and a Mandal in Kurnool district in the state of Andhra Pradesh in India.

== Geography ==
The famous temple of Shri Kshetragudi Anjaneya Swamy is located 3 km from this village. It's a surname for many families that hail from this erstwhile Karnataka Village. This famous temple is also known as Shri Chatragudi Anjaneya Swamy Mandiram, this name of the Lord "Chatragudi" is only found in Halaharvi and its surrounding places. Residents belonging to these areas name their children "Chatragudi" in tribute to the Lord.
