= Pamur =

Pamuru Sarpapuri Pamur
- Town
- Location in Andhra Pradesh, India
- Coordinates: 15.1167°N 79.4167°E
- Country: India
- State: Andhra Pradesh
- District: Markapuram
- Mandal: Pamuru

Government
  - Type: Municipal corporation
  - Body: Nagar Palika

Area
  - Total: 16.15 km^{2} (6.24 sq mi)

Population (2011)
  - Total: 20,000
  - Density: 1,200/km^{2} (3,200/sq mi)

Languages
  - Official: Telugu
- Time zone: UTC+5:30 (IST)
- Postal code: 523 108
- Vehicle registration: AP

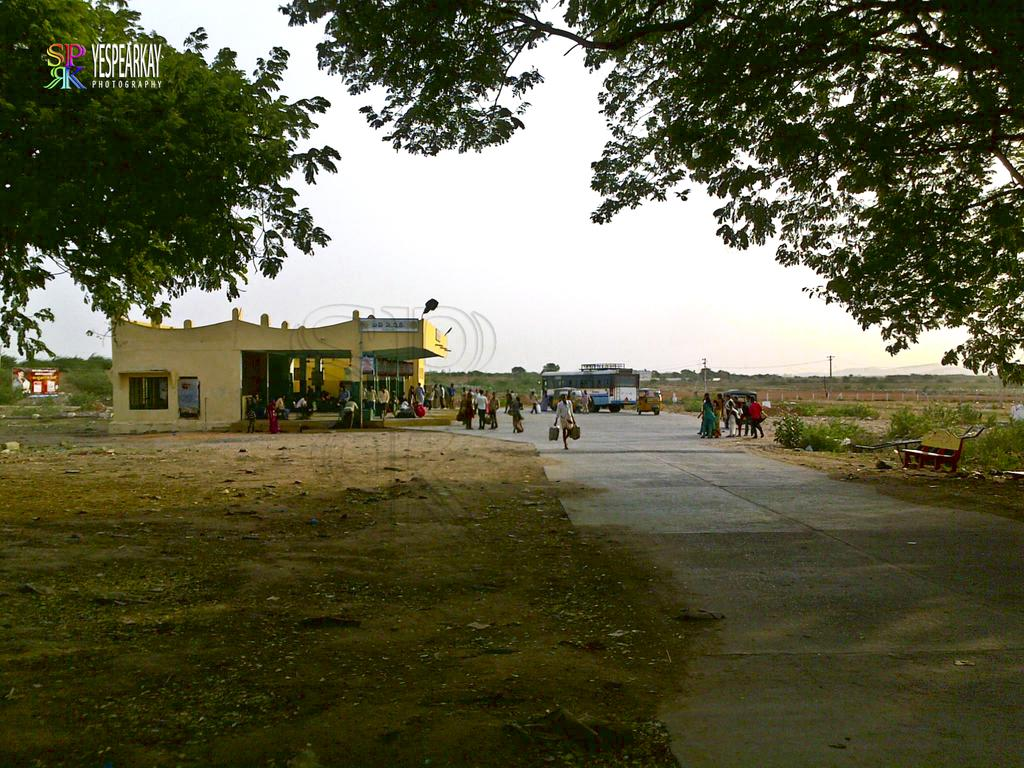

Pamuru is a town in Markapuram district of the Indian state of Andhra Pradesh. It is the mandal headquarters of Pamuru mandal in Kanigiri revenue division. This is the border town of Prakasam district. This is near from Nellore than Ongole around 100 km and also near by Kadapa. It is 66 km away from Podili, 38 km away from Kanigiri, 60 km away from Kandukur.

== Demographics ==
As of 2011 Census of India, the town had a population of 20,000. The total population constitute, 10,340 males, 9,660 females and 2,348 children, in the age The average literacy rate stands at 75.31% with 13,294 literates, higher than the national average of 73.00%.

== Education ==
The primary and secondary school education is imparted by government, aided and private schools, under the School Education Department of the state. The medium of instruction followed by different schools are English, Telugu. Chief minister Nara Chandrababu Naidu laid foundation stone for the Dr APJ Abdul Kalam IIIT at Dubagunta in Pamuru mandal of Kanigiri assembly constituency. IIIT will be constructed and infrastructure provided with a budget of Rs 1200 crores.
