= Alur, Kurnool district =

Aluru Alur Kurnool
- Taluka
- Interactive map of Aluru
- Location in Andhra Pradesh, India
- Coordinates: 15°23′39″N 77°13′35″E
- Country: India
- State: Andhra Pradesh
- District: Kurnool
- Mandal: Alur

Government
  - Type: Grama Panchayat
  - Body: Aluru Gram panchayat

Population (2011)
  - Total: 14,426

Languages
  - Official: Telugu
- Time zone: UTC+5:30 (IST)
- PIN: 518395
- Telephone code: 08523
- Vehicle registration: AP 21 AP 39

Aluru (ah-LOO-roo) is a village in Alur mandal in the Kurnool district of Andhra Pradesh in India. Alur Assembly Segment is a part of Kurnool Parliamentary segment.

== Temples ==
There are two well-known temples in Aluru. The Lord Navanepattayya Swamy Temple is famous for the modern-looking Lord Sai Baba of Shirdi Temple, located near National Highway 167 in the centre of the town. The temple provides financial resources to support the village's many schools.

The Anjaneya Swamy Temple is a forest temple located just outside Aluru. Hindus often use it as a site for marriages and/or other celebrations. Hindus who use this temple are typically from Aluru.

== Demographics ==
As of 2011 census, the town had a population of 14,426.

== Education ==
The primary and secondary school education is imparted by government, aided and private schools, under the School Education Department of the state. The medium of instruction followed by different schools are English, Telugu.

== Transport ==
Aluru is situated on Kurnool-Ballari Highway. And also on Guntakal-Adoni Highway.

Aluru can also be reached by taking the National Highway 167 which connects to Ballari - Jadcherla - Kodad. This road goes through Aluru.

=== NH 167 Route> ===
Ballari road at NH 67 ↔ Alur ↔ Adoni ↔ Raichur ↔ Mahabubnagar ↔ Jadcherla NH 44 ↔ Kalwakurthy ↔ Devarakonda ↔ Miryalaguda ↔ Kodad NH 65

=== Distance to Major towns and cities ===
1. Kurnool = 103 km
2. Adoni = 28 km
3. Nandyal = 180 km
4. Guntakal = 31 km
5. Yemmiganur = 55 km
6. Mantralayam = 77 km
7. Ballari = 46 km
8. Raichur = 103 km
9. Anantapuramu = 105 km
10. Hyderabad = 310 km
11. Bengaluru = 321 km
12. Vijayawada = 445 km
13. Chennai = 483 km
14. Kadapa = 242 km
