= Dornala =

- Village
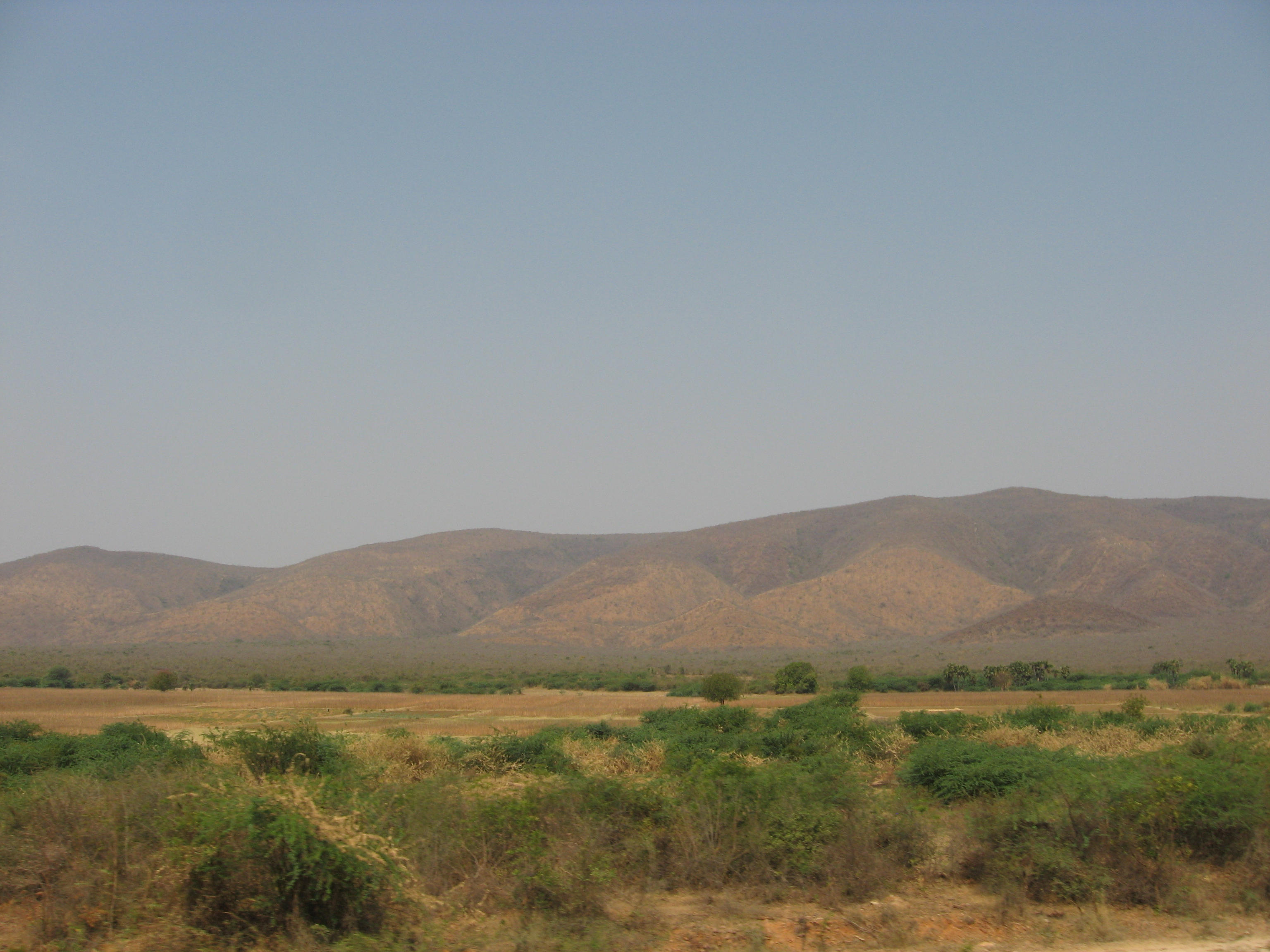
- Nallamalla Hills near Dornala
- Interactive map of Dornala
- Location in Andhra Pradesh, India
- Coordinates: 15.9000°N 79.1000°E
- Country: India
- State: Andhra Pradesh
- District: Markapuram
- Mandal: Dornala

Area
  - Total: 24.50 km^{2} (9.46 sq mi)
- Elevation: 208 m (682 ft)

Population (2011)
  - Total: 11,993
  - Density: 489.5/km^{2} (1,268/sq mi)

Languages
  - Official: Telugu
- Time zone: UTC+5:30 (IST)
- Vehicle registration: AP

Dornala is a village in Markapuram district of the Indian state of Andhra Pradesh. It is the mandal headquarters of Dornala mandal in Markapur revenue division.

== Geography ==
Doranala is located at 15.9000°N 79.1000°E and is surrounded by Nallamala Forest. It is located at 49 kilometres (30 mi) distance to Srisailam the famous jyothirlinga kshetram of 12.

== Transport ==
The KG road passes through the village which connects the towns Kurnool and Guntur. Nearest Railway Station is Markapur road which is 32 kilometres (20 mi) away. Hyderabad city is 277 kilometres (172 mi) away by Srisailam road.
