= Gonegandla =

- Mandal
- Interactive map of Gonegandla
- Location in Andhra Pradesh, India Gonegandla (India)
- Coordinates: 15.7167°N 77.6000°E
- Country: India
- State: Andhra Pradesh
- District: Kurnool
- Elevation: 370 m (1,210 ft)

Population (2001)
  - Total: 16,691

Languages
  - Official: Telugu
- Time zone: UTC+5:30 (IST)
- Vehicle registration: AP

Gonegandla is a village in Gonegandla mandal in Kurnool district of Andhra Pradesh, India.

== Geography ==
Gonegandla is located at 15.7167°N 77.6000°E. It has an average elevation of 370 meters (1217 feet).
