= Holagunda =

- Mandal
- Interactive map of Holagunda
- Location in Andhra Pradesh, India
- Coordinates: 15.4873182°N 77.0463719°E
- Country: India
- State: Andhra Pradesh
- District: Kurnool
- Talukas: Holagunda

Language Spoken
- Time zone: UTC+5:30 (IST)
- PIN: 518346
- Vehicle registration: AP

Holagunda is a village and a Mandal in Kurnool district in the state of Andhra Pradesh, India.
