= Devanakonda =

- Mandal
- Location within India
- Coordinates: 15.5333°N 77.5500°E
- Country: India
- State: Andhra Pradesh
- District: Kurnool
- Revenue Division: Adoni

Area
  - Total: 480 km^{2} (190 sq mi)

Population (2011)
  - Total: 71,237

Languages
  - Official: Telugu
- Time zone: UTC+5:30 (IST)

Devanakonda is a mandal in the Kurnool district of Andhra Pradesh, India. It comes under Adoni revenue division. It is under Alur M.L.A and Kurnool M.P constituencies. The Mandal contains 15 various villages.

== Geography ==
Devanakonda is located in South-Central India at 15.5333°N 77.5500°E.

== Connectivity ==
Devanakonda is connected by road, as railway connectivity is currently unavailable. The state government runs Andhra Pradesh State Road Transport Corporation (APSRTC) buses through this village, connecting several destinations such as Kurnool, Pattikonda, Yemmiganur, Dhone, Guntakal and Hyderabad.

The trip from Kurnool to Devanakonda by road, which is roughly 65 km and takes around one and a half hours.
