= Duttalur =

- Village
- Interactive map of Duttalur
- Location in Andhra Pradesh, India Duttalur (India)
- Coordinates: 14.8526269°N 79.4045559°E
- Country: India
- State: Andhra Pradesh
- District: Nellore
- Elevation: 134 m (440 ft)

Population
  - Total: 3,000

Languages
  - Official: Telugu
- Time zone: UTC+5:30 (IST)
- PIN: 524222
- Telephone code: 08620
- Vehicle registration: AP-39
- Sex ratio: 2:1 ♂/♀

Duttalur or Duthalur is a village and a mandal in Nellore district in the state of Andhra Pradesh in India.

== Geography ==
Duttalur is located at 14.8500°N 79.4167°E. It has an average elevation of 134 meters (442 feet). It is located in the Nellore district of Andhra Pradesh, about 46 km from the nearest town. The village is spread over an area of 7584 hectares with a population of 6509 people, according to 2011 census data. The number of males in the village is 3295, and females 3214. The number of people in scheduled castes is 1255 and the number of scheduled tribes is 204. The census location code of the village is 591777. Its pincode is 524222.
