= Markapuram =

- Town
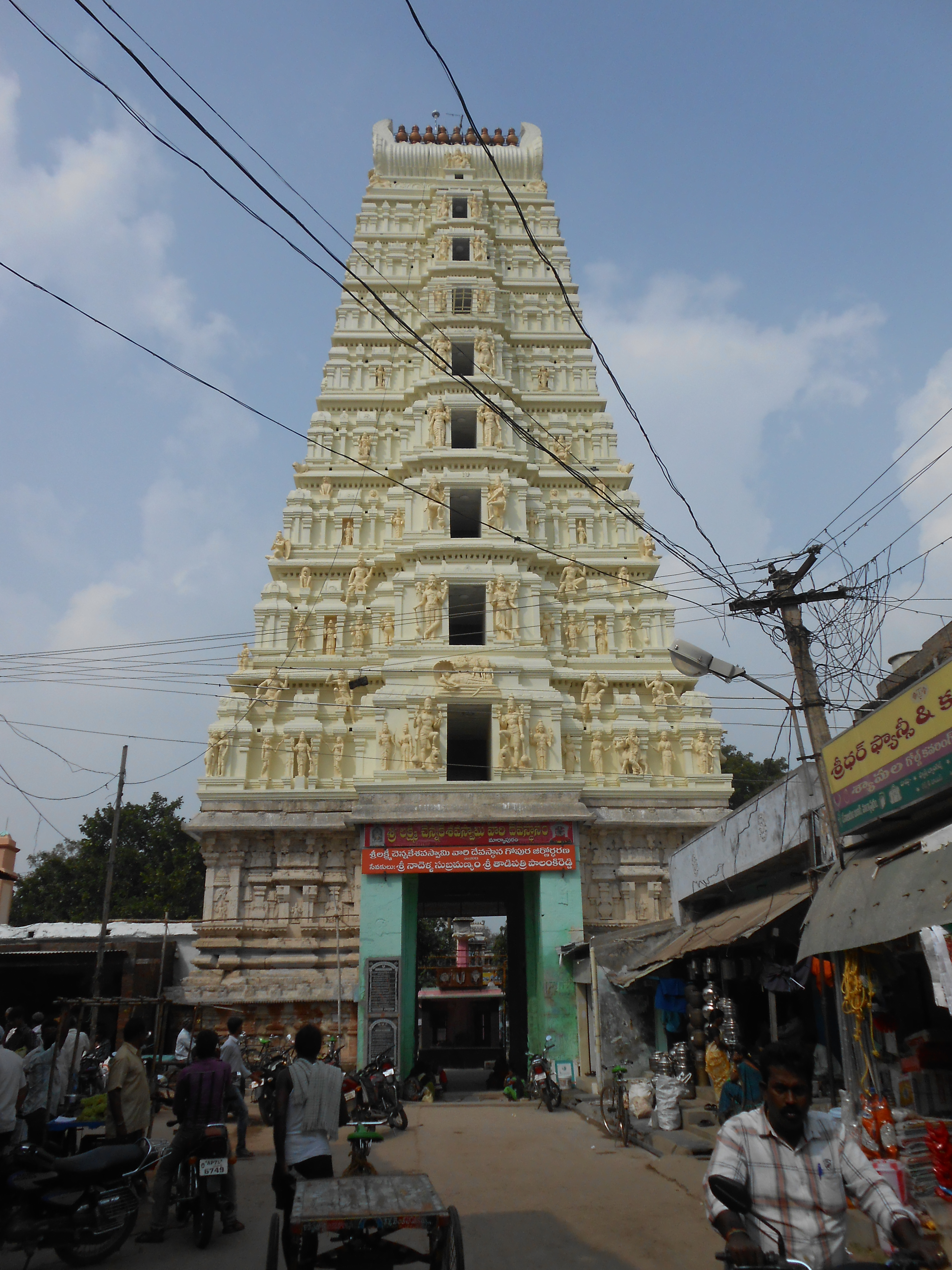
- Chennakesava Temple, Markapuram

- Location in Andhra Pradesh, India
- Coordinates: 15.73°N 79.26°E
- Country: India
- State: Andhra Pradesh
- District: Markapuram

Government
  - Type: Municipal council
  - Body: Markapuram Municipality

Area
  - Total: 52.96 km^{2} (20.45 sq mi)
- Elevation: 145 m (476 ft)

Population (2011)
  - Total: 71,092
  - Rank: 11th (Towns in AP)
  - Density: 1,342/km^{2} (3,477/sq mi)

Languages
  - Official: Telugu
- Time zone: UTC+5:30 (IST)
- PIN: 523316
- telephone code: +91–8596
- Vehicle registration: AP
- Website: Markapuram Municipality

Markapuram is a town and the headquarters of Markapuram district of the Indian state of Andhra Pradesh. It is a municipality and is the headquarters of Markapuram Municipality in Markapuram revenue division. Markapuram is notable for the Chennakesava Swamy Temple (2nd largest gopuram in Telugu States with 135 feet height), built by King Sri Krishnadevaraya. During Ratha Yatra (Tirunalla in Telugu) there occurs a popular carnival; the town is also famous for Chenna Kesavaswamy (Saptavahana Seva) on the day of Rathsapthami, which is attended by around 1 lakh+ people coming from different parts of the state.

Markapuram was formerly a part of Kurnool District, serving as the east gate of Rayalaseema. The town is close to the Nallamala Hills and it is often transit hub to Srisailam. It currently has a population of approximately 1,00,000. Markapur Town's religious breakdown is 60% Hindu, 35% Muslim, and 5% Christian. Markapuram is known for slate manufacturing industries.

Temples and tourism spots include Markapuram Sri Lakshmi chennakesava temple, Tripurantakam Bala Tripura sundari temple, Bhairavakona Temple & Waterfalls, Nemaligundam Rangaswamy temple & Waterfalls, Mokshagundam Satyavolu shiva temple, Nekkanti Neelakhanta temple, Tummalacheruvu Muharram festival, Cumbum Lake, Kothakota fort (Rayalaseema ruler), Veligonda temple, Ardaveedu waterfalls, Nallamalla sagar reservoir and hills, Papinenipalli hills, Kanigiri hills & Veligonda hills.

== History ==
The town's name comes from a story of a milk maid by the name of Marika who was graced with a son by Swamy Chennakesava. The milk maid, in commemoration of this event, constructed a small temple. Soon afterwards a village grew round and about this temple and was known as Marikapuram. By afflux of time this name evolved into Markapuram. The temple, originally constructed by Marika, underwent numerous additions and renovations majorly during Sri Krishnadevaraya's Rule, the later large and prominent temple being dedicated to Sri Chennakesava.

This town was a part of Kurnool District until 1971. Yerragondapalem, Markapuram, and Giddalur mandals were in Kurnool district until 1971, when a carve-out made a new district (along with Kanigiri, Podili, Darsi, Kandukur from Nellore District and Ongole and Chirala from Guntur district).

== Geography ==
Markapuram is situated about 100 km (62 mi) east of Kurnool and about three miles north-east of the Vijayawada–Guntakal railway line. Markapuram is located at 15.73°N 79.28°E at an average elevation of 145 metres (476 ft) and is surrounded by Nallamala Forest. An important industry in Markapuram is slate manufacturing. It exported slate to other countries in the late 1980s. It is one of the revenue divisions in Markapuram district.

== Transport ==
Markapuram is located on the Ananthapur–Amaravati Express Highway, a section of the Expressway Project. It is 95 km (59 mi) away from Ongole, 43 km (27 mi) away from Podili, and Nandyal is 120 km (75 mi) away on the other side of Nallamala hills.

It is a part of the Guntur division of South Central Railway division. The railway line from Vijayawada to Guntakal passes through this station. Markapuram is near Srisailam. People visiting Srisailam take the train route through Markapuram railway station.

Donakonda Airport was used by the British during World War 2 and is also close to Markapuram.

== Education ==
The primary and secondary school education is imparted by government in conjunction with private schools, under the School Education Department of the state. Instruction is given in both English and Telugu.

N.S. Agricultural College is located in Markapur, along with other degree colleges, including engineering. Various coaching institutes are there which help for competitive exams.

== Notable people ==
- Betha Sudhakar – Indian Telugu-language actor and comedian
- Johnny Lever – Indian Hindi-language actor and comedian
- Kandula Narayana Reddy – Indian politician; representative of the Telugu Desam Party
- Audimulapu Suresh – Indian politician; representative of the YSR Congress Party
