= Chippagiri =

- Village
- Interactive map of Chippagiri
- Location in Andhra Pradesh, India Chippagiri (India)
- Coordinates: 15.2333°N 77.3167°E
- Country: India
- State: Andhra Pradesh
- District: Kurnool

Population (2011)
  - Total: 4,805

Languages
  - Official: Telugu
- Time zone: UTC+5:30 (IST)
- Vehicle registration: AP

Chippagiri is a village and madal headquarters of Chippagiri mandal located in the Kurnool district of Andhra Pradesh, India. It is about 15 kilometres (9 mi) from Kasapuram, which is 5 kilometres (3 mi) from Guntakal.

== History ==
The Chippagiri village was previously named Bhaskara Shrine because a sage named Bhaskara Muni was known to have carried out prayers on the hill. It is believed that the shrine was moved to Hampi due to severe water problems and the shrine was renamed from Shilpagiri to Chippagiri (also known as Andhra Hampi). The temples of Virupaksheswara and Chennekeswara were first built in Chippagiri.

Bhogeswara, the Hindu temple, was visited by Vijayanagara Empire emperor Krishnadevaraya. The legend says that while he stayed overnight in the village, Anjaneya came into his dreams and said to build temples in the area.

Vijaya Dasa (1682–1755) lived in Chippagiri.
