= Yemmiganur =

Town in Andhra Pradesh, India

Yemmiganur Yemmiganuru
- Town
- Location in Andhra Pradesh, India
- Coordinates: 15.7333°N 77.4833°E
- Country: India
- State: Andhra Pradesh
- District: Kurnool

Government
  - Type: Municipality
  - Body: Yemmiganur Municipality
  - MLA: B.V.Jayanageswar Reddy (TDP)

Area
  - Total: 14.50 km^{2} (5.60 sq mi)

Population (2011)
  - Total: 95,149
  - Rank: 1st (Towns in AP)
  - Density: 6,562/km^{2} (17,000/sq mi)

Languages
  - Official: Telugu (Official) [
- Time zone: UTC+5:30
- Postal code: 518 xxx
- Vehicle registration: AP-21 (old), AP-39 (new)
- Website: Yemmiganur Municipality

Yemmiganur, natively known as Yemmiganuru, is a town in Kurnool district of the Indian state of Andhra Pradesh. It is located in Yemmiganur mandal of Adoni revenue division.

== History ==
Yemmiganur is one of the major towns in the Kurnool district. It was part of the Vijayanagar from the 14th century to the 16th century. From 1953 to 1956 it was an Andhra state, now in part of Andhra Pradesh. In 1965 the Panchayat of Yemiganur was upgraded to a Municipality. Now it is a Grade -I Municipality. It is a City at present.

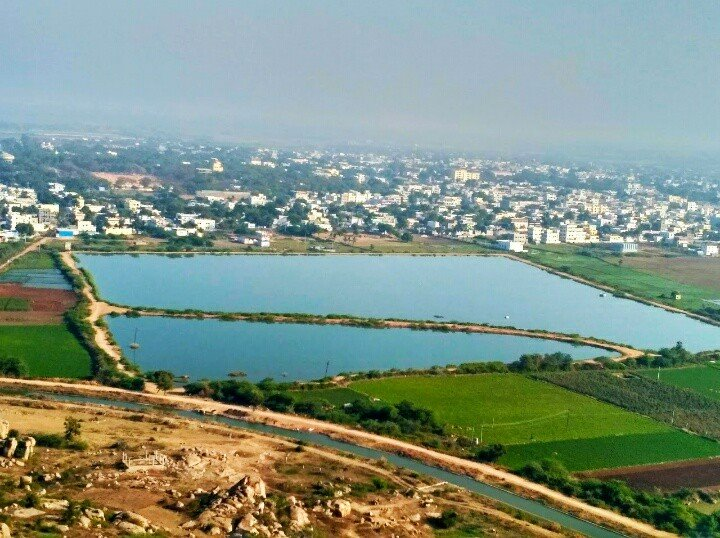
Yemmiganur Car Festival

== Demographics ==
As of 2011 Census of India, the town had a population of 95,149. The total population constitute, 47,456 males, 47,693 females and 12,177 children, in the age group of 0–6 years. The average literacy rate was at 62.98% with 52,254 literates, significantly lower than the national average of 73.00%.

== Transport ==
The Andhra Pradesh State Road Transport Corporation operates bus services from Yemmiganur bus station.

== Education ==
The primary and secondary school education is provided by government, aided and private schools, under the School Education Department of the state. The medium of instruction followed by different schools include English, Telugu.

St.John's College of Engineering and Pharmaceutical Sciences is situated in Yerrakota near Yemmiganur.

== See also ==
List of towns in Andhra Pradesh Yemmiganur (Assembly constituency)
