= Markapuram district =

District of Andhra Pradesh, India

- District of Andhra Pradesh
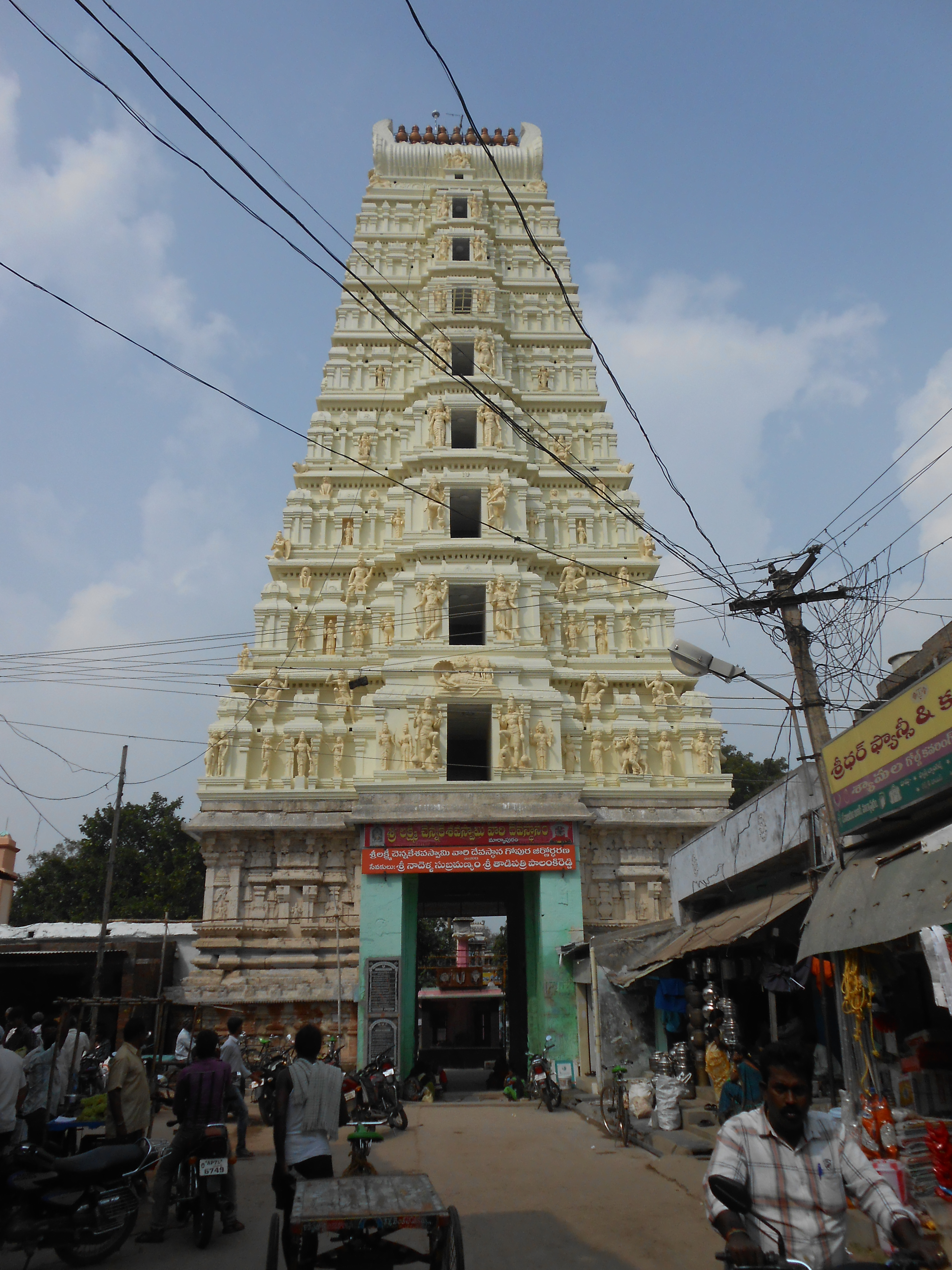
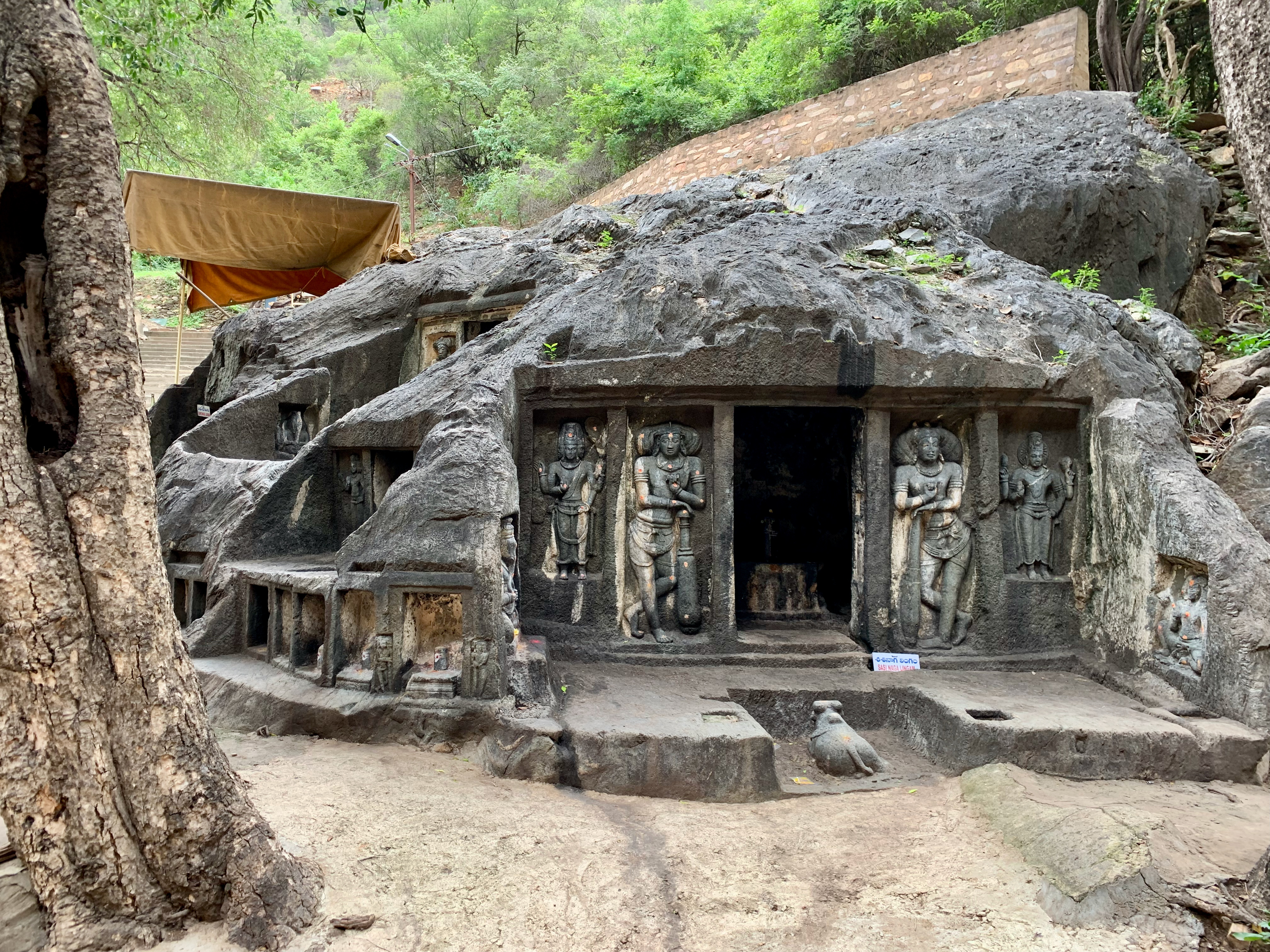
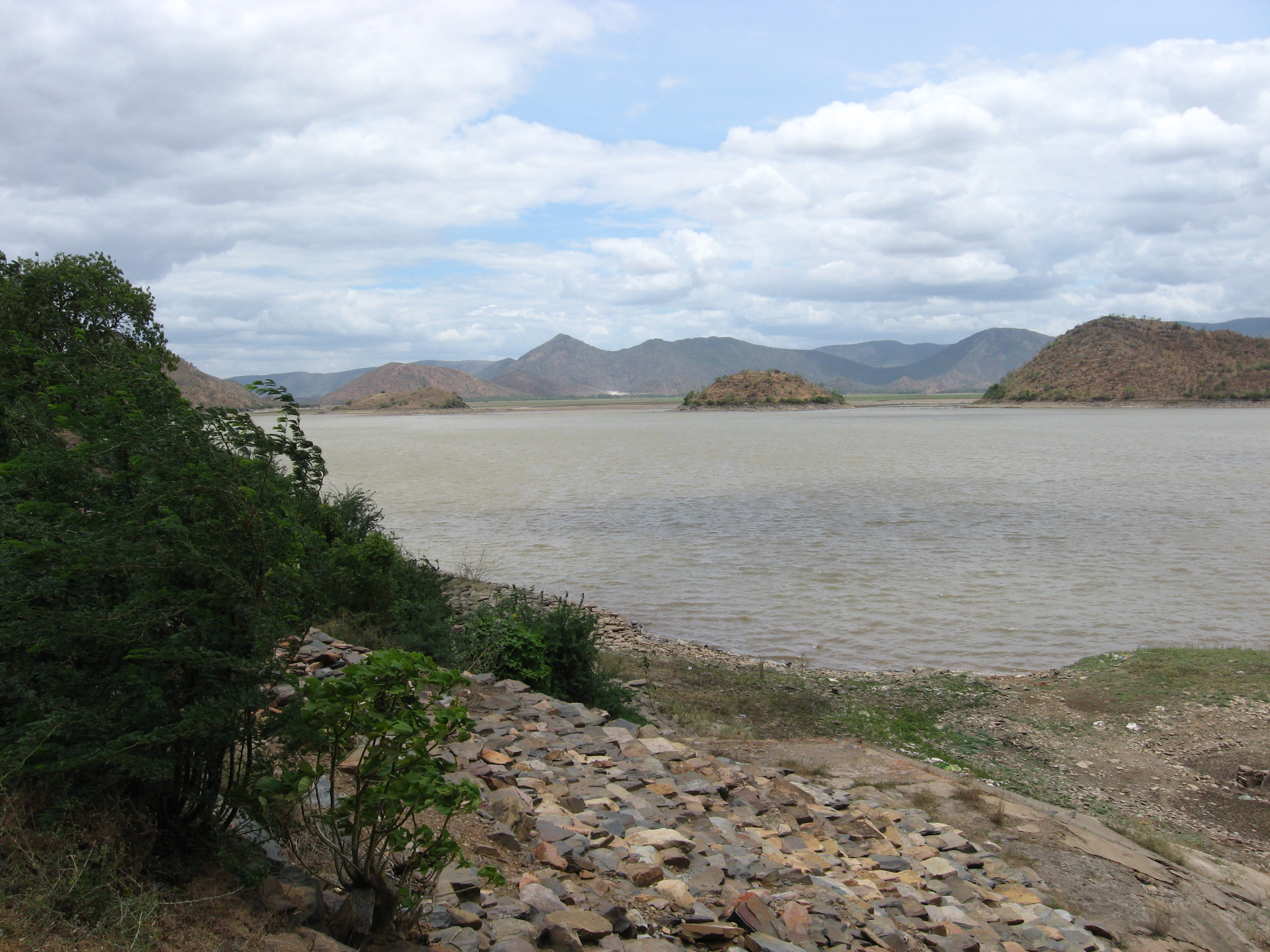
- Clockwise from top-left: Chennakesava Temple Markapuram, Bhairavakona Cave temples, Cumbum Lake

- Markapuram district in Andhra Pradesh
- Interactive map of Markapuram district
- Coordinates: 15.735°N 79.27°E
- Country: India
- State: Andhra Pradesh
- Region: Rayalaseema
- Formed: 31 December 2025
- Founder: Government of Andhra Pradesh
- Headquarters: Markapuram
- Largest city: Markapuram
- Administrative Divisions: 2 revenue divisions Markapuram, Kanigiri; 21 Mandals

Government
  - District Collector: M Vijaya Suneetha IAS
  - SP: V. Harshavardhan Raju, IPS

Area
  - Total: 10,035 km^{2} (3,875 sq mi)

Population (2011)
  - Total: 1,142,313
  - Density: 113.83/km^{2} (294.83/sq mi)

Languages
  - Official: Telugu

Literacy
- Time zone: UTC+05:30 (IST)
- Postal Index Number: 523XXX
- District LGD code: 790
- Website: markapuram.ap.gov.in

Markapuram district is one of the twenty eight districts in the Indian state of Andhra Pradesh. It was formed in 2025. The headquarters of the district is located at Markapuram.

== Etymology ==
The name of the district is derived from the name of the district headquarters, Markapuram.

== History ==
Markapuram district is formed by carving out the under developed four assembly constituencies from West Prakasam. Historically Markapuram and Giddalur talukas were part of kurnool district, while the Podili and Kanigiri talukas were under nellore district.

== Geography ==
Markapuram district is bounded by Nagarkurnool district of Telangana state in the north, YSR Kadapa,SPSR Nellore districts in the south, Nandyal district in the west, Palnadu and Prakasam districts in the east.

The Nallamalas and the Veligondas are the major hill ranges in the district which separate the District from Kurnool and YSR Kadapa Districts.The Nallamalas consist of a range of continuous fairly steep hills with an average elevation of about 620 meters above sea level. There are two passes in the Nallamalas namely, the Nandi Kanuma and Manbala Kanuma. The Nandi Kanuma passes from Bellary (in Karnataka) via Kurnool, Dornala, and Yerragondapalem to Markapur. The portions of Veligondas stand prominently as two continuous parallel ranges of fairly steep hills running in a north–south direction with a wide valley in between. The water from the eastern range of hills drains in a northerly direction to the Gundlakamma river. The Gundlakumma river flows in this district Thippayapalem Reservoir, Duvvaleru Project, Cumbum tank and Bhavanasi tanks are constructed on this river.

=== Flora and Fauna ===
The total forest area is 4,42,073 Ha. which forms 30.86% of the total geographical area.The Nallamalla forest has wildlife including tigers.

=== Mineral resources ===
Markapuram is India's main slate-manufacturing town.

== Administrative divisions ==
The District comprises two revenue divisions viz., Markapuram and Kanigiri. There are a total of 21 mandals, with 6 in Kanigiri division and 15 in Markapuram division.

1. Kanigiri revenue division
  1. Chandrasekharapuram
  2. Hanumanthunipadu
  3. Kanigiri
  4. Pamuru
  5. Pedacherlopalle
  6. Veligandla
2. Markapuram revenue division
  1. Ardhaveedu
  2. Bestavaripeta
  3. Cumbum
  4. Dornala
  5. Giddalur
  6. Komarolu
  7. Konakanamitla
  8. Markapuram
  9. Pedda Araveedu
  10. Podili
  11. Pullalacheruvu
  12. Racherla
  13. Tarlupadu
  14. Tripuranthakam
  15. Yerragondapalem

=== Cities and towns ===
Cities and towns in Markapuram District
| Ciy/Town | Civil status | Revenue Division | Population (2011) |
|---|---|---|---|
| Markapuram | Grade-II Municipality | Markapuram | 71,092 |
| Kanigiri | Grade-II Municipality | Kanigiri | 37,420 |
| Giddaluru | Grade-II Municipality | Markapuram | 35,150 |
| Podili | Nagar panchayat | Markapuram | 31,145 |

== Demographics ==
Religions in present Markapuram district (2011)
| Religion | Percent |
| Hinduism | 91.50% |
| Islam | 7.93% |
| Other or not stated | 0.57% |
Distribution of religions

At the time of the 2011 census what is now Markapuram district had a population of 11,42,313. The sex ratio is 962 females per 1000 males and the literacy rate is 60.87%. 192,010 (16.87%) live in urban areas. Scheduled Castes and Scheduled Tribes made up 243,353 (21.30%) and 47,224 (4.13%) of the population respectively.

Languages of present Markapuram district (2011)
1. Telugu (92.5%)
2. Urdu (6.29%)
3. Others (1.16%)

Language wise, 92.55% of the population of the district spoke Telugu and 6.29% Urdu as their first language.

== Politics ==
Markapuram district forms part of one parliamentary constituency and has four assembly constituencies. The district lies partly in the Ongole Lok Sabha constituency.

The assembly constituencies in the district are:

| Constituency number | Name | Reserved for (SC/ST/None) | Lok Sabha constituency |
|---|---|---|---|
| 102 | Yerragondapalem | SC | Ongole |
| 111 | Markapuram | None | Ongole |
| 112 | Giddalur | None | Ongole |
| 113 | Kanigiri | None | Ongole |

== Tourism ==
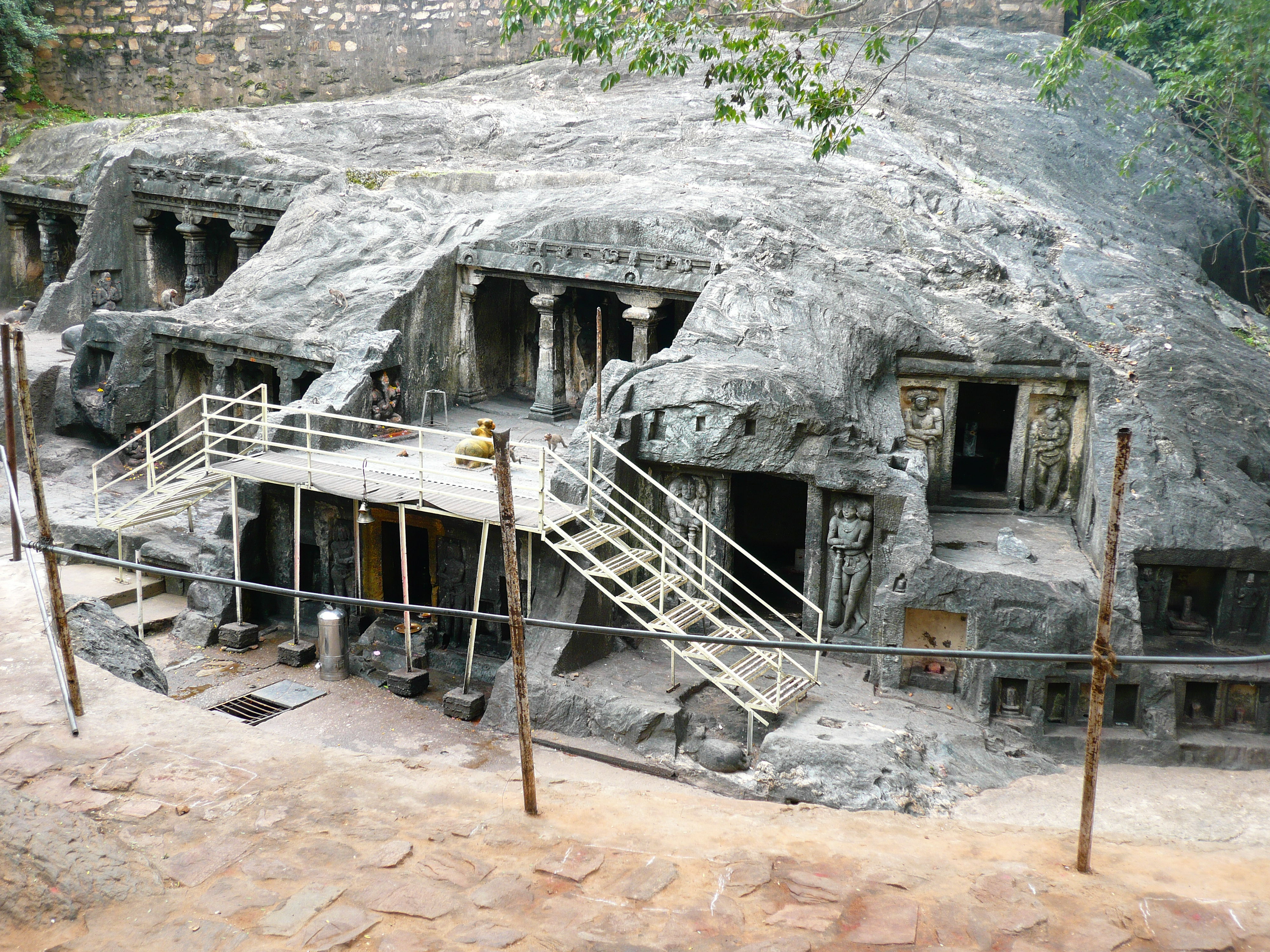
Bhairavakona

Markapuram district tourist places (After zoom, hover mouse on the marker for more details)

The Bhairavakona cave temples in the district are 8th-century single rock-cut cave temples (similar to Mahabalipuram) for Lord Shiva. Other religious places include the Sri Bala Tripuranthakeswara and Sri Bala Tripurasundaridevi temples at Tripuranthakam and the Chenna Kesava temple in Markapuram.

Cumbum tank is one of the oldest man-made lakes in Asia. The anicut was built by the Vijayanagar Princess Varadharajamma (also known as Ruchidevi), wife of Sri Krishna Devaraya. The length of this tank is 7 km (4.3 mi) and width is 3 km (1.9 mi). It has received World Heritage Irrigation Structure (WHIS) tag in the year 2020 by UNESCO.
