= Beeda Ravichandra =

Indian politician

- బీద రవిచంద్ర

Member of the Andhra Pradesh Legislative Council
- Incumbent
- Assumed office 30 March 2025
- In office 12 June 2015 – 11 June 2021

Personal details
- Born: 1965 or 1966 (age 60–61)
- Party: Telugu Desam Party
- Website: beedaravi.in

Beeda Ravichandra Yadav (Telugu: బీద రవిచంద్ర యాదవ్) is an Indian politician from the state of Andhra Pradesh and a member of the Andhra Pradesh Legislative Council. He has held several organisational positions in the Telugu Desam Party, including national general secretary and leadership positions in the party's branch in Nellore district.

== Early life ==
Ravichandra is the son of Raghuramaiah and younger brother of Rajya Sabha member Beeda Masthan Rao. He is from the village of Isakapalle in Allur mandal. He has a Master of Commerce degree and is an aquaculturist.

== Career ==
=== Party politics ===
Ravichandra began his political career in the Telugu Desam Party (TDP) and has remained associated with the party throughout his documented political career.. In 1990, he became secretary of the Telugu Yuvata, the TDP's youth wing, in Allur mandal. He served as general secretary of the TDP's Nellore district branch (2000-2010), as state party assistant secretary and Kadapa district leader (2007–2008), and as co-ordinator for the Eluru and Machilipatnam parliamentary constituencies (2011). He also served as president of Telugu Yuvata from 2008 to 2014.

Ravichandra served as president of the TDP's Nellore district branch for eight years. In October 2020, TDP president N. Chandrababu Naidu announced a new organisational structure of the party in which Ravichandra was appointed as a national general secretary of the TDP.

Ravichandra was a member of the district council (Zilla Parishad Territorial Constituency) in Bogole (2006) and Alluru (2021).

=== Legislative Council ===
Ravichandra served as a member of the Andhra Pradesh Legislative Council (APLC) from 2015 to 2021.

In March 2025, the TDP nominated Ravichandra as one of its three candidates for five APLC seats to be elected by members of the Andhra Pradesh Legislative Assembly. As only five nominations were received for the five available seats, Ravichandra and the other four candidates were declared elected unopposed on 13 March 2025. He took oath as a member of the APLC in April 2025.

== Personal life ==
Ravichandra is married to Jyothi and has a son, Gokul Rishwanth.
