= Beeramgunta Poleramma Temple =

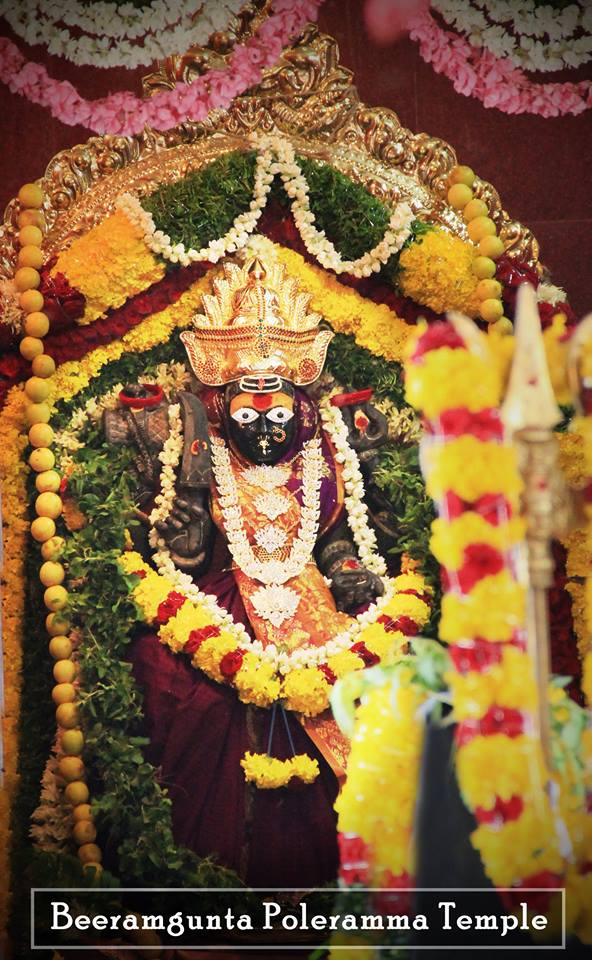

- Location in Andhra Pradesh

Religion
- Affiliation: Hinduism
- District: Nellore
- Deity: Poleramma
- Festivals: Sankranti Tirunalu, Kumbam, Poleramma Jatara
- Governing body: Poleramma Ammavari Sannidi

Location
- Location: Beeramgunta
- State: Andhra Pradesh
- Country: India
- Interactive map of Beeramgunta Poleramma Temple
- Coordinates: 14°37′41.31″N 80°2′6.46″E

Architecture
- Temple: 1

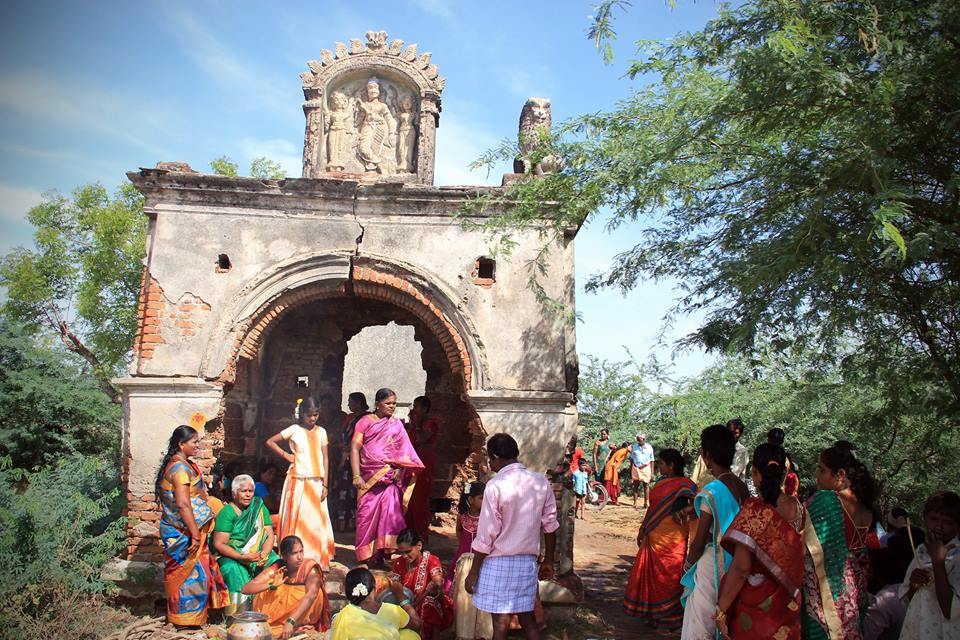
The temple structure from the outside

Beeramgunta Poleramma Temple is a re-established 200 years-old temple in the Nellore district of Andhra Pradesh, sacred to the goddess Poleramma. Poleramma is a pre-Vedic deity, who is predominantly worshipped in Andhra Pradesh, and a local form of Sakti. She is worshipped as Grama devata (goddess who protects the village).

The new temple was established in the center of the village, although Poleramma is a coast goddess whose temples are usually established at the outskirts of villages. This is also observed in various other places in Andhra Pradesh including Allur.

== History ==
The temple was first constructed by British village officer in India in the 1800s, before which villagers worship Poleramma in form of a mud deity, created on special occasions but without permanent form or establishment. Since the permanent temple was established, Poleramma celebrations were performed with rituals in various Hindu festival celebrations.

Funds for the new temple were collected by villagers and the actual construction carried out by construction village youths.
