= Beeda Masthan Rao =

Indian politician

Beedha Masthan Rao

Member of Parliament, Rajya Sabha
- Incumbent
- Assumed office 22 June 2022
- Preceded by: T. G. Venkatesh
- Constituency: Andhra Pradesh

Member of Legislative Assembly Andhra Pradesh
- In office 2009 - 2014
- Preceded by: Magunta Parvathamma
- Succeeded by: Ramireddy Pratap Kumar Reddy
- Constituency: Kavali

Personal details
- Party: Telugu Desam Party (2009-2019) (2024-Incumbent)
- Other political affiliations: YSR Congress Party (2019-2024)
- Relatives: Beeda Ravichandra

Beedha Masthan Rao Yadav is an Indian politician and businessman from Andhra Pradesh. He was Member of the Legislative Assembly (MLA) for Kavali constituency. He was elected to the Rajya Sabha in 2022.

== Political career ==
From 2001 to 2006, Rao was ZPTC Member of Bogole Mandal, in Nellore district. In 2004, he contested as a member of the Andhra Pradesh Legislative Assembly for the Allur constituency.

From 2009 to 2014, he was MLA for Kavali constituency, Andhra Pradesh, and was on the Legislative Committee for BC Welfare. He was also Chairman of the Standing Committee on Labour, Factories, Employment and Training, Tourism; and Information Technology.

From 2014 to 2019, Rao was an advisory member of the Capital Region Development Authority of the Government of Andhra Pradesh. In 2019, he contested for election to the Nellore Lok Sabha constituency.

In 2022, Rao was elected as Member of Parliament in the Rajya Sabha, and served on the Consultative Committee for the Ministry of Commerce and Industry. He resigned to YSR Congress party's primary membership and also as Rajya Sabha MP on 29 August 2024. He joined Telugu Desam Party in the Presence of Chief Minister Nara Chandrababu Naidu on 9 October 2024.

== Election History ==
=== Rajya Sabha ===
Position	Party	Constituency	From	To	Tenure
Member of Parliament, Rajya Sabha (1st Term)	YSRCP	Andhra Pradesh	22 June 2022	29 August 2024	2 years, 68 days
Member of Parliament, Rajya Sabha (2nd Term)	TDP	Andhra Pradesh	13 Dec 2024	21 June 2028	3 years, 191 days
