= Annangi =

- Village
- Interactive map of Annangi
- Location in Andhra Pradesh Annangi (India)
- Coordinates: 15°40′25″N 79°59′45″E
- Country: India
- State: Andhra Pradesh

Languages
  - Official: Telugu
- Time zone: UTC+5:30 (IST)
- PIN: 523211
- Telephone code: +918592
- Vehicle registration: AP27

Annangi is a village located in Maddipadu Mandal of Prakasam district, Andhra Pradesh, India This village in located on the banks of the Gundlakamma river.

== Demographics ==
The village has total 701 families residing. It has a population of 2243 out of which 1100 are males while 1143 are females as per population census 2011. The main occupation of annangi residents is agriculture. The village is famous for tobacco production.

== See also ==
- Ongole
- Medarametla
- Addanki
