= Maddipadu mandal =

- Mandal
- Interactive map of Maddipadu mandal
- Location in Andhra Pradesh, India
- Coordinates: 15°59′N 80°02′E
- Country: India
- State: Andhra Pradesh
- District: Prakasam
- Headquarters: Maddipadu

Population (2011)
  - Total: 52,353

Languages
  - Official: Telugu
- Time zone: UTC+5:30 (IST)

Maddipadu mandal is a mandal in Prakasam district of the state of Andhra Pradesh, India. Its headquarters are located at Maddipadu. The mandal is bounded by Naguluppalapadu, Ongole, Santhanuthlapadu, and Chimakurthi mandals. The mandals lies on the shore of Bay of Bengal.

== Demographics ==
As of 2011 census, the mandal had a population of 52,353. The total population constitute, 26,155 males and 26,198 females —a sex ratio of 1002 females per 1000 males. 5,220 children are in the age group of 0–6 years, of which 2,731 are boys and 2,489 are girls —a ratio of 911 per 1000. The average literacy rate stands at 64.51% with 30,406 literates. in maddipadu oldest temple is Sri Ramalayam constructed nearly 100 years back. In the last 10 years temple is developed lot by Ramalaya Committee. Three festivels conducted in temple every year goda devi vratham and godadevi kalyanam on bhogi and sriramanavami, vaikuntaekadasi are famous festivals in temple

== Towns and villages ==
The mandal has 23 revenue villages, that includes:

1. Annangi
2. Basavannapalem
3. Burepalli
4. Doddavaram
5. Doddavarappadu
6. Edugundlapadu
7. Gadiyapudi
8. Garlapadu
9. Gundla Palli
10. Inamanamellur
11. Keerthi Padu
12. Kolachanakota
13. Lingamgunta
14. Maddipadu
15. Mallavaram
16. Nagannapalem
17. Nandipadu
18. Nelatur
19. Peda Kotha Palle
20. Rachavaripalem
21. Seetharampuram
22. Tellabadu
23. Vellam Palle
24. Venkatarajupalem

== See also ==
- Prakasam district
