= NAM Expressway National Highway =

Road in Andhra Pradesh and Telangana, India

Narketpally–Addanki–Medarametla

Route information
- Length: 212.5 km (132.0 mi)

Major junctions
- North end: Narketpally Telangana
- South end: Medarametla, Andhra Pradesh

Location
- Country: India
- States: Telangana: 87.64 km Andhra Pradesh:124.86 km

Highway system
- Roads in India; Expressways; National; State; Asian
← NH 65	→ NH 16

Narketpally–Addanki–Medarametla Road, built by a company named NAM Expressways Limited is a four lane toll road in Andhra Pradesh and Telangana states. It starts at Narketpally in Telangana on NH 65 and ends at Medarametla in Andhra Pradesh on NH 16. It helps to reduce the distance from Hyderabad and Mumbai to Chennai. It has a total length of 212.5 kilometers and is managed by Cube highways

== History ==
The road contract on build, operate and transfer basis was awarded on 23 July 2010 to Ramky infrastructure in consortium with IL&FS Transportation Networks (ITNL) with a concession period of 24 years including construction period of 2.5 years. This was facilitated by the World Bank through Andhra Pradesh & Telangana Road Sector Project. The road is 212.500 Km long and starts from Narketpally in Telangana on NH 65 and ends at Medarametla in Andhra Pradesh on NH 16. The stretch from 0.000 km to 87.640 km is in Telangana and from 87.640 km to 212.500 km is in Andhra Pradesh. The road passes primarily through plain terrain across undivided Nalgonda district of Telangana and undivided Guntur and Prakasam Districts of Andhra Pradesh. Approximately 83% of the corridor is through rural areas. The major urban areas in the vicinity of the road are Damarcherla, Nalgonda, Piduguralla and Addanki.

The road passes through 61 settlements in 37 revenue villages. The total land requirement is 194.605 acres with 164.775 acres of private land and 29.83 acres of government land. The land acquisition for four-lane expansion of the road started in July 2011, when the entire road is in Undivided Andhra Pradesh. Out of 164.775 acres of private land, government has completed land acquisition process for 96.01 acres and handed over to NAMEL. The construction of road elements located on the handed over land is completed. The construction work is pending for about 6 km of planned road length due to delays in land acquisition.

The road received the provisional certificate from the independent Engineer for 190.38 km of the road length in 2014. Subsequently, the allowable total toll length as of September 2021 is 203.8O5km with approvals granted in 2016, 2018 and 2020 for additional 13.425 km road length.

There are three toll plazas at Madugulapally (TP1, chainage 41.125; Undivided Nalgonda district), Tummalacheruvu (TP2, chainage1 10.200; Undivided Guntur District) and Elchuru (TP3, chainage 168.200; Undivided Prakasam District). Toll collection was started on 11th March 2014.

== Route ==
It passes through Nalgonda, Miryalaguda, Dachepalle, Piduguralla and Addanki.

== Junctions ==
NH 65 in Narketpally, Telangana
NH 16 in Medarametla, Andhra Pradesh
