= Chitoor Gopalakrishnan =

Chitoor Gopalakrishnan (1921 - 27 August 2006) was a violinist in Carnatic music. He came from a family of musicians.

== Early life ==
Born in Chennai in 1921 in a family of musicians, he learnt to play violin from his father Vedachala Iyer. Iyer was Asthana Vidwan in two Samasthanams (princely states) namely Venkatagiri and Chandragiri.

== Career ==
Gopalakrishnan began his career at the age of 13 as a supporting artiste. He accompanied most of the musicians at that time - like Tiger Varadachariar, Chembai Vaidyanatha Bhagavatar, D. K. Pattammal and many others. He worked in the music department of All India Radio in its Delhi and Madras (now Chennai) radio stations. His work with AIR lasted 40 years. While in Delhi, he gave a solo violin Carnatic music performance for Viceroy Lord Wavel. He retired from All India Radio in 1981. After retirement, he established a school in a village at North Arcot district to coach students in Carnatic music.

== Death ==
Gopalakrishnan died on 27 August 2006 at the age of 86.
