= Allur, Nellore district =

Allur Alluru
- Town
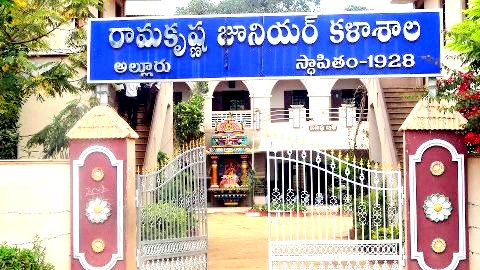
- Ramakrishna Junior College Entrance

- Location in Andhra Pradesh, India Allur (India)
- Coordinates: 14.68°N 80.06°E
- Country: India
- State: Andhra Pradesh
- District: Nellore

Area
  - Total: 30.28 km^{2} (11.69 sq mi)

Population (2020)
  - Total: 26,392
  - Density: 871.6/km^{2} (2,257/sq mi)

Languages
  - Official: Telugu
- Time zone: UTC+5:30 (IST)
- PIN: 524315
- Telephone code: +91-8622
- Sex ratio: 1021:1000 ♂/♀

Allur, or also Alluru, is a town in Nellore district of the Indian state of Andhra Pradesh. It is a Nagar Panchayat and it is the headquarters of Allur Mandal of Kavali revenue division.

== Geography ==
Allur is bounded by Alluru peta, Gogulapalli, Graddagunta, Isakapalli, Indupuru, North Mopuru, Puruni and Singapeta villages. It is about 30 km northwest of Nellore and lying between the railroad and seacoast. Allur is located at 14°41′N 80°3′E.

Part of the area is served by Pennar canals and the rest of the area is served by rain fed tanks. Most soils are red soils and low in Nitrogen, medium in Phosphorus, high in Carbon and high in Potash.

== History ==
Allur was an important revenue center and also an important station for the American Baptist Missions in the Nellore district.

=== British India ===
Mr. John E. Clough and Dr. Lyman D. Jewett, American Christian missionaries from Boston, visited Allur in 1865. A dwelling house and few acres of land were purchased for ₹ 1100 ($500) and old travelers bungalow was bought for ₹ 350. The land for missionary, about ten acres, was brought by Dr. Jewitt in 1870. Allur was chosen as the fourth mission after Nellore, Ramayapatnam and Ongole in the district. An American Baptist church with 44 members was established in 1873 by Mr. Edwin Bullard. He abandoned Allur mission in 1874 and made it as the outstation for Nellore mission. Mr. W. S. Davis, missionary from New Jersey, worked there for four decades from 1873 till his return to United States. Resident missionaries were specially appointed to work at church since 1893. Mr. Davis secured the sanction of 275 acres of land from Nellore District Collector Mr. Scott, which was subsequently distributed to the Christian community in three-acre parcels.

A mosque was built in 1910. Communal troubles arose around 1924 over the right of Hindu processions to play music before the mosque until Hindus got a decree for permission in 1928.

=== Freedom movement ===
Allur, along with nearby Gogulapalle village, became a venue of Salt Satyagraha in Nellore District on April 15, 1930. Several leaders, including Chinthalapalli Lakshmi Narasimham and Kavali Mahalakshamma, were arrested. Mahatma Gandhi visited Allur on 30 December 1933 as part of his coastal Andhra trip after Salt Satyagraha revolution and attended one Panchayat meeting and one public meeting.

== Demographics ==
As of the 2011 Census of India, Allur had a population of 11,656. The total population constitute, 5,768 males and 5,888 females —a sex ratio of 1021 females per 1000 males. 1,195 children are in the age group of 0–6 years, of which 616 are boys and 579 are girls. The average literacy rate stands at 68.88% with 7,206 literates, lower than the state average of 67.41%.

== Government ==
Allur Nagar panchayat is the local self-government of the village. The panchayat is divided into wards and each ward is represented by an elected ward member. The ward members are headed by a sarpanch and the present sarpanch is Kareti Chandra Leelamma. K.Vijayaramu is the secretary of the panchayat.

=== Administration ===
Allur was under the jurisdiction of Nellore district in Madras state of British India. In the Madras presidency, Allur was also a station of Deputy Tahsildar and Sub-Magistrate. A sub registrar office to register documents and deeds was established in 1871 and it was one of the 14 sub registrar offices in the district.

Allur was also originally part of Nellore Taluk. A new Kovur Taluk was created from Nellore in 1910 and Allur became part of it. Taluks were reorganized as Mandals in 1985 and Allur became a mandal.

=== Politics ===
Allur was an assembly constituency in Andhra Pradesh from 1978 to 2009. There are 1,36,127 registered voters in Allur constituency in 1999 elections. As part of reorganization in 2009 and Allur mandal became part of Kavali assembly constituency and Bucchi and other areas became part of Kovur assembly constituency.

- 1978 - Giddaluru Sundara Ramaiah, Indian National Congress
- 1983 - Bezawada Papi Reddy, Telugu Desam Party
- 1985 - Jakka Venkayya, Communist Party of India (Marxist)
- 1989 - Katamreddy Vishnuvardhan Reddy - Indian National Congress
- 1994 - Jakka Venkayya,- Communist Party of India (Marxist)
- 1999 - Adala Prabhakar Reddy - Telugu Desam Party
- 2004 - Katamreddy Vishnuvardhan Reddy - Indian National Congress

== Economy ==
Allur was known for its agriculture and nearby Isakapalli salt factory. Allur was one of the chief centers of trade in Nellore District. Rice produced from Allur and nearby villages is exported to neighbouring states such as Tamil Nadu and Karnataka. To distinguish it from other Allur, that was also part of Nellore district before Ongole district was carved, it was called as Pantala Allur or Allur with staple and its namesake was called as Akula Allur or Allur with leaves.

According to gazettes published during the British rule, Allur was the largest land revenue generating town in entire Nellore district with the revenue of ₹ 53,000 in 1901. It was home for 3,677 people in 1873 and the population increased to 5190 by 1881. The population further increased to 7,527 by 1901 and it was considered as the second largest populous town after Nellore in Taluk.

=== Banking ===
- Punjab National Bank, Allur ( IFSI Code: PUNB0935000, MICR Code: 524024007)
- Andhra Pragathi Grameena Bank, Allur ( IFSI Code: APGB0004039, MICR Code: 524703682)
- State Bank Of India, Allur ( IFSI Code: SBIN0015069, MICR Code: NA)
- Syndicate Bank, Allur (IFSI Code: SYNB0003464, MICR Code: 524025505)
- The Andhra Pradesh State Cooperative Bank Limited, Allur ( IFSI Code: APBL0009021, MICR Code: 524841682)

== Education ==
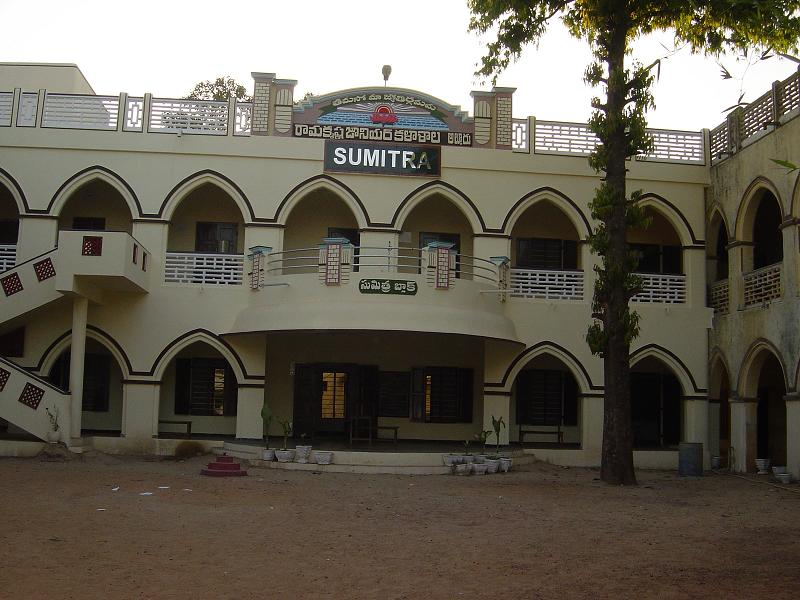
Allur Ramakrishna Junior College

Until 1868, there were only outdoor elementary schools that taught Telugu reading, writing, poetry and basic math. That year, the British government established a secondary school starting with 44 students under the 1864 Education Act and a system of payments based on results was introduced to increase school attendance. American Baptist Mission started a middle school around 1878 and maintained till 1927. A boarding school for boys was opened in 1907.

Madabushi Seshachari, who was appointed in the ABM school, later urged the rich of Allur to start a school so that he could help them by joining the school for the all-round development of the school and also to promote educational values in the younger generation of the village. He also took help from Ramakrishna Mission for organising the school and started Ramakrishna Middle School in 1928. The school was extended to a high school in 1934, to a junior college in 1950, and to degree college in 1998.

== Health care ==
The first government-aided dispensary was started in 1872. There are two public hospitals run by the government, Allur Government Hospital and Ayurvedic hospital.

== Culture ==
The village has one ancient Siddeshwara temple and one ancient Gopalaswamy or Vishnu temple. There are inscriptions on a pillar in front of the temple of Siddeswara and on the flooring in front of Gopalaswamy temple. A woman called Perantalamma died in a Sati sacrifice and a temple was constructed in her memory.

People of Allur celebrate a special festival honouring Poleramma, village goddess, on a Tuesday of January every year. The floors are decorated with rangavalli and village is decorated with lights and flowers. A heap of cooked rice is offered along with Neem leaves in the morning. The deity is placed in a palanquin on a tiger or a swan and taken in a procession.

== Transport ==
The best way to reach Allur is by road.

- Road: Allur is between two major towns, Nellore or Kavali. The Andhra Pradesh state road transport APSRTC runs a lot of buses to Allur from both of them. The APSRTC also operates nonstop bus services from Nellore to Allur. The national highway is 13 km away at Kodavaluru.
- Rail : Nearest railway station is 11 km away at Bitragunta and main railway stations are Nellore and Kavali
- Air : The nearest airport is at Tirupati (Renigunta), which is 150 km from the village which has limited services to certain domestic destinations like Vijayawada, Hyderabad, Visakhapatnam, Mumbai and Delhi. The nearest international airport is the Chennai International Airport, about 200 km from the village, which is an international airport providing connectivity to major parts of India and the world.
