= Magunta Parvathamma =

Indian politician (1947–2024)

Member of Legislative Assembly Andhra Pradesh
- In office 2004–2009
- Preceded by: Vanteru Venugopal Reddy
- Succeeded by: Beeda Masthan Rao
- Constituency: Kavali

Member of Parliament, Lok Sabha
- In office 1996–1998
- Preceded by: Magunta Subbarama Reddy
- Succeeded by: Magunta Sreenivasulu Reddy
- Constituency: Ongole

Personal details
- Born: 27 July 1947 Buchireddypalem, Nellore district, Madras Province, British India
- Died: 25 September 2024 (aged 77)
- Party: Indian National Congress

Magunta Parvathi Subramma Reddy (27 July 1947 – 25 September 2024), commonly known as Magunta Parvathamma, was an Indian National Congress politician from Andhra Pradesh. She was a member of the 11th Lok Sabha and won the 2004 Andhra Pradesh Legislative Assembly election.

== Early life ==
Magunta was born on 27 July 1947 in Buchireddypalem of Nellore district, to Bezawada Rama Reddy and his wife. She did her schooling from Kasturi Devi Girls School.

== Career ==
For the 1996 Indian general election, the Indian National Congress (INC) made Parvathamma its candidate from Ongole. She obtained 3,81,475 votes while her nearest rival Mekapati Rajamohan Reddy of Telugu Desam Party (TDP) received 3,31,415. After winning the seat she became a member of the 11th Lok Sabha. During the 2004 Andhra Pradesh Legislative Assembly election, she won from Kavali securing 57.68% of the total votes polled. Parvathamma was one of the contestants for the Ongole assembly seat during the 2012 Andhra Pradesh by-election. She was a director of the Pearl Distillery.

== Personal life and death ==
On 19 February 1967, she married politician Magunta Subbarama Reddy. Together they had two children. Reddy was shot dead by members of the People's War Group in 1995.

Parvathamma died on 25 September 2024, at the age of 77.
