= Ramireddy Pratap Kumar Reddy =

Indian politician (born 1966)

Member of Legislative Assembly Andhra Pradesh
- In office 2014–2024
- Preceded by: Beeda Masthan Rao
- Succeeded by: Dagumati Venkata Krishna Reddy
- Constituency: Kavali

Ramireddy Pratap Kumar Reddy (born 1966) is an Indian politician from Andhra Pradesh. He is a former MLA of YSR Congress Party from Kavali Assembly Constituency in Nellore District. He won the 2019 Andhra Pradesh Legislative Assembly election. He is nominated again by YSR Congress Party to contest the 2024 Assembly election but he lost from Kavali.

== Early life and education ==
Reddy was born in Musunuru village to Subbarami Reddy. He completed his AMIE in Civil Engineering from the Institute of Engineers through distance education in 1989. Later, he worked at RSR Engineering College.

== Career ==
Reddy started his political career with Indian National Congress but soon joined Praja Rajyam Party and contested the 2009 Andhra Pradesh Legislative Assembly Election without any success. Later in 2011, he joined YSR Congress Party and won the 2014 Andhra Pradesh Legislative Assembly Election representing YSRCP defeating Beeda Masthan Rao of Telugu Desam Party by a margin of 4,969 votes. He retained the Kavali seat in 2019 Andhra Pradesh Legislative Assembly Election from Kavali Assembly Constituency representing YSR Congress Party as he defeated Katamreddy Vishnu Vardhan Reddy garu of Telugu Desam Party by a margin of 14,117 votes. However, contesting again from the Kavali seat on YSR Congress Party ticket, he lost the 2024 Andhra Pradesh Legislative Assembly election to Dagumati Venkata Krishna Reddy by a margin of 30,948 votes. He polled 75,588 votes against 1,06,536 votes polled by Krishna Reddy.
