= Ongole Lok Sabha constituency =

Indian political subdivision

Coordinates: 15.5°N 80.0°E

Ongole
- Lok Sabha constituency
- Interactive Map Outlining Ongole Lok Sabha constituency

Constituency details
- Country: India
- Region: South India
- State: Andhra Pradesh
- Assembly constituencies: Yerragondapalem; Darsi; Ongole; Kondapi; Markapuram; Giddalur; Kanigiri
- Established: 1952
- Total electors: 13,42,368
- Reservation: None

Member of Parliament
- 18th Lok Sabha
- Incumbent Magunta Sreenivasulu Reddy
- Party: TDP
- Alliance: NDA
- Elected year: 2024
- Preceded by: Y. V. Subba Reddy

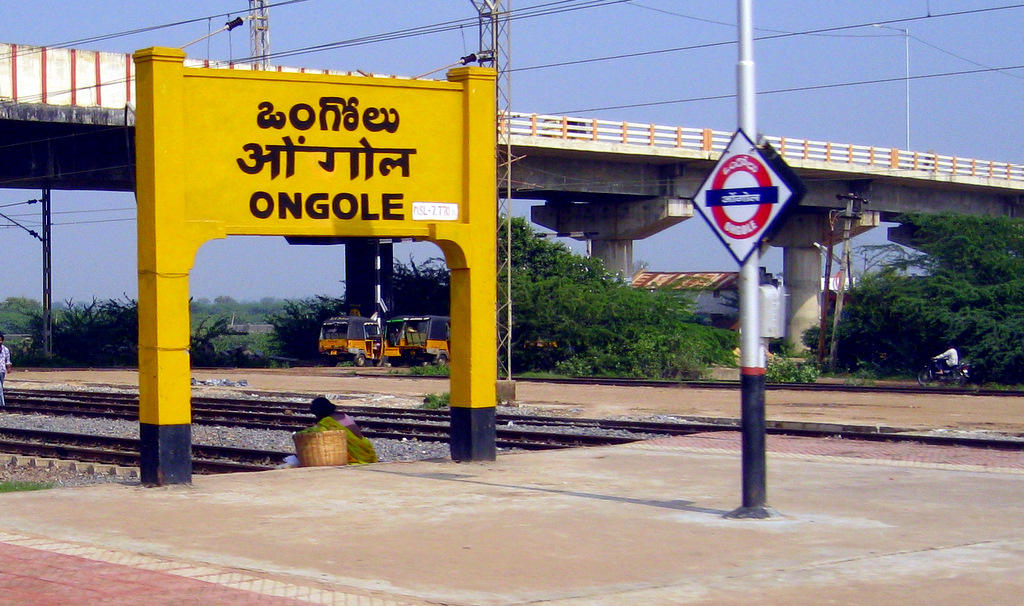
Ongole

Ongole Lok Sabha constituency is one of the twenty-five Lok Sabha constituencies of Andhra Pradesh in India. It comprises seven assembly segments and belongs to the Prakasam district and Markapuram district. Magunta Sreenivasulu Reddy of TDP won the seat in the 2024 elections.

== Assembly segments ==
Ongole Lok Sabha constituency presently comprises the following Legislative Assembly segments:

#	Name	District
102	Yerragondapalem(SC)	Markapuram
103	Darsi	Prakasam
108	Ongole	Prakasam
110	Kondapi(SC)	Prakasam
111	Markapuram	Markapuram
112	Giddaluru	Markapuram
113	Kanigiri	Markapuram

== Members of Parliament ==
INC won eleven times. TDP won three times. YSRCP won two times. CPI and Independents won one time each.

Year	Member	Party
1952	M Nanadass	Independent
1952	P.Venkataraghavaiah	Independent
1957	Ronda Narapa Reddy	Indian National Congress
1962	Madala Narayanaswamy	Communist Party of India
1967	Jaggayya	Indian National Congress
1971	P. Ankineedu Prasada Rao	Indian National Congress
1977	Puli Venkata Reddy	Indian National Congress
1980	Puli Venkata Reddy	Indian National Congress
1984	Bezawada Papi Reddy	Telugu Desam Party
1989	Mekapati Rajamohan Reddy	Indian National Congress
1991	Magunta Subbarama Reddy	Indian National Congress
1996	Magunta Parvathamma	Indian National Congress
1998	Magunta Sreenivasulu Reddy	Indian National Congress
1999	Karanam Balarama Krishna Murthy	Telugu Desam Party
2004	Magunta Sreenivasulu Reddy	Indian National Congress
2009	Magunta Sreenivasulu Reddy	Indian National Congress
2014	Y. V. Subba Reddy	YSR Congress Party
2019	Magunta Sreenivasulu Reddy	YSR Congress Party
2024	Magunta Sreenivasulu Reddy	Telugu Desam Party

== Election results ==
=== General Election 1989 ===
General Election, 1989: Ongole
Party	Candidate	Votes	%	±%
INC	Mekapati Rajamohan Reddy	396,282	56.07	+9.39
TDP	Narayanaswamy Katuri	298,912	42.29	−8.60
Majority		97,370	13.78	
Turnout		706,811	63.84	−1.25
INC gain from TDP		Swing		

=== General Election 1991 ===
General Election, 1991: Ongole
Party	Candidate	Votes	%	±%
INC	Magunta Subbarama Reddy	329,913	49.67	
TDP	Dega Narasimha Reddy	290,583	43.75	
Independent	Pammi Chakra Reddy	35,199	5.3	
Majority		39,330	5.92	
Turnout		664,143	59.91	
INC hold		Swing		

=== General Election 1996 ===
General Election, 1996: Ongole
Party	Candidate	Votes	%	±%
INC	Magunta Parvathamma Subbarama Reddy	381,475	50.42	+0.75
TDP	Mekapati Rajamohan Reddy	331,415	43.80	+0.50
Majority		50,060	6.62	
Turnout		756,598	63.85	+3.94
INC hold		Swing		

=== General Election 1998 ===
General Election, 1998: Ongole
Party	Candidate	Votes	%	±%
INC	Magunta Sreenivasulu Reddy	351,390	47.75	−2.67
TDP	Mekapati Rajamohan Reddy	330,524	44.92	+1.12
Majority		20,866	2.83	
Turnout		735,876	62.40	−1.45
INC hold		Swing		

=== General Election 1999 ===
General Election, 1999: Ongole
Party	Candidate	Votes	%	±%
TDP	Karanam Balarama Krishna Murthy	392,840	50.58	+5.66
INC	Magunta Sreenivasulu Reddy	370,892	47.77	+0.01
Majority		21,948	2.81	
Turnout		776,640	65.25	+2.85
TDP gain from INC		Swing		

=== General Election 2004 ===
General Election, 2004: Ongole
Party	Candidate	Votes	%	±%
INC	Magunta Sreenivasulu Reddy	446,584	55.89	+8.13
TDP	Bathula Vijaya Bharathi	340,563	42.62	−7.96
Majority		106,021	13.27	
Turnout		799,109	75.10	+0.85
INC gain from TDP		Swing		

=== General Election 2009 ===
General Election, 2009: Ongole
Party	Candidate	Votes	%	±%
INC	Magunta Sreenivasulu Reddy	450,442	44.10	−11.79
TDP	Madduluri Malakondaiah Yadav	371,919	36.41	−6.21
PRP	Pidathala Sai Kalpana	142,303	13.93	−6.21
Majority		78,523	7.69	
Turnout		1,021,349	74.26	−0.84
INC hold		Swing		

=== General Election 2014 ===
General Election, 2014: Ongole
Party	Candidate	Votes	%	±%
YSRCP	Y. V. Subba Reddy	589,960	48.83	N/A
TDP	Magunta Sreenivasulu Reddy	574,302	47.53	+11.12
INC	Darisi Pavana Kumar	13,357	1.11	−42.99
BSP	Krishna Rao Vemula	5,863	0.49	N/A
AAP	Sadam Satyanarayana Raja Yadav	4,393	0.36	N/A
NOTA	None of the Above	5,781	0.48	N/A
Majority		15,658	1.30	−6.39
Turnout		1,208,225	82.17	+7.91
YSRCP gain from INC		Swing		

=== 2019 ===
2019 Indian general elections: Ongole
Party	Candidate	Votes	%	±%
YSRCP	Magunta Sreenivasulu Reddy	739,202	55.07	+6.24
TDP	Sidda Raghava Rao	524,351	39.06	−8.47
JSP	Bellamkonda Saibabu	29,379	2.19	N/A
NOTA	None of the Above	20,865	1.55	+1.07
Majority		214,851	16.01	+14.71
Turnout		13,44,003	86.35	
Registered electors		15,56,469		
YSRCP hold		Swing		

=== 2024 ===
2024 Indian general elections: Ongole
Party	Candidate	Votes	%	±%
TDP	Magunta Sreenivasulu Reddy	701,894	49.35	
YSRCP	Chevireddy Bhaskar Reddy	6,51,695	45.82	
INC	Eda Sudhakar Reddy	26,722	1.88	
NOTA	None of the above	13,205	0.93	
Majority		50,199	3.53	−12.41
Turnout		14,25,958	88.32	
TDP gain from YSRCP		Swing		

== See also ==
- List of constituencies of the Andhra Pradesh Legislative Assembly
