= Rachavaripalem =

- Village
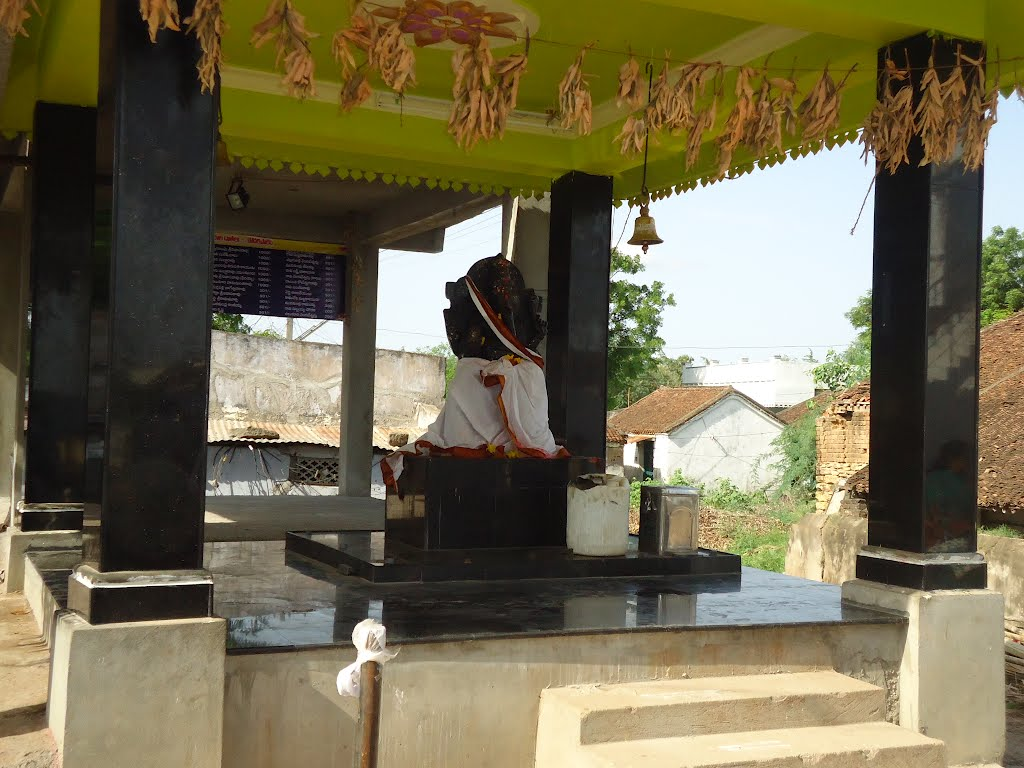
- A local temple
- Interactive map of Rachavaripalem
- Location in Andhra Pradesh, India Rachavaripalem (India)
- Coordinates: 15.641334°N 80.040918°E
- Country: India
- State: Andhra Pradesh
- Districts of Andhra Pradesh: Prakasam
- Mandal: Maddiapdu
- Founder: Unknown

Government
  - Body: Sarpanch

Population (2014)
  - Total: 1,292

Languages
  - Official: Telugu
- Time zone: UTC+5:30 (IST)
- PIN: 523211
- Tele: 08592

Rachavaripalem is a village in Maddipadu mandal in Prakasam district in the state of Andhra Pradesh in India.

== Location ==
Rachavaripalem is 20 km (12 mi) from Ongole and 3 km (1.9 mi) from NH45. Three sides of the village are surrounded by the Gundlakamma river.

== Demographics ==
As of 2011 India census, Rachavaripalem had a population of 1,292, with 578 males and 714 females, across 551 houses.

== See also ==
- Maddipadu mandal
