= Magunta Sreenivasulu Reddy =

Indian Politician

Member of Parliament, Lok Sabha
- Incumbent
- Assumed office 23 May 2019
- Preceded by: Y. V. Subba Reddy
- Constituency: Ongole
- In office 2004–2014
- Preceded by: Karanam Balaram Krishna Murthy
- Succeeded by: Y. V. Subba Reddy
- Constituency: Ongole
- In office 1998–1999
- Preceded by: Magunta Parvathamma
- Succeeded by: Karanam Balaram Krishna Murthy
- Constituency: Ongole

Member Of Andhra Pradesh Legislative Council
- In office 2015–2019

Personal details
- Born: 15 October 1953 (age 72) Nellore, Andhra Pradesh
- Party: Telugu Desam Party (March 2024– ) (2014–2019)
- Other political affiliations: Indian National Congress (1998–2014); YSR Congress Party (2019–2024)
- Spouse: Geeta
- Children: 2 sons
- As of 16 September, 2006 Source: [permanent dead link]

Magunta Sreenivasulu Reddy (born 15 October 1953) is an Indian politician and liquor baron currently serving as the Member of Parliament (MP) representing the Ongole constituency in the Lok Sabha, affiliated with the Telugu Desam Party (TDP) since March 2024. Over his career, Sreenivasulu Reddy has represented Ongole in multiple Lok Sabha terms—initially as a member of the Indian National Congress (INC) in the 12th, 14th and 15th Lok Sabha, and later with the YSR Congress Party (YCP) in the 17th Lok Sabha. He transitioned to the TDP in 2024 after resigning from YCP.

Sreenivasulu Reddy has also been associated with an excise duty investigation by the Enforcement Directorate (ED), which led to the arrest of Delhi Chief Minister Arvind Kejriwal. He is the younger brother of prominent politician Magunta Subbarama Reddy.

== Background ==
Magunta Sreenivasulu Reddy is the younger brother of politician and liquor baron Magunta Subbarama Reddy (1947–1995). Magunta family originally hailed from Nellore district, but began their political career in the Prakasam district, with Subbarama Reddy representing the Ongole constituency as a member of the Indian National Congress. The Magunta family is known for their significant influence in the Prakasam and Nellore districts of Andhra Pradesh. Subbarama Reddy was assassinated by Naxalites in 1995.

== Career ==
Sreenivasulu Reddy was elected to the 12th, 14th and 15th Lok Sabha as a Candidate of Indian National Congress and again to 17th Lok Sabha as a candidate of YSR Congress Party (YCP).

He quit Congress in 2014, soon after the bill to split Andhra Pradesh was passed by the Lok Sabha and joined Telugu Desam Party and became Member of Legislative Council (MLC).

He lost the 2014 Indian general election and joined YSR Congress Party in 2019, where he contested from Ongole as a candidate of YSRCP and won with a record majority of 2,14,000 votes. He resigned from the ruling YCP on 28 February 2024 and joined TDP on 16 March in the presence of TDP national president N. Chandrababu Naidu.

== Electoral record ==
Year	Election	Party	Constituency Name	Result
1998	12th Lok Sabha	Indian National Congress	Ongole	Won
1999	13th Lok Sabha	Indian National Congress	Ongole	Lost
2004	14th Lok Sabha	Indian National Congress	Ongole	Won
2009	15th Lok Sabha	Indian National Congress	Ongole	Won
2014	16th Lok Sabha	Telugu Desam Party	Ongole	Lost
2019	17th Lok Sabha	YSR Congress Party	Ongole	Won
2024	18th Lok Sabha	Telugu Desam Party	Ongole	Won
