= Ronda Narappa Reddy =

Indian politician (born 1922)

Member of Parliament, Lok Sabha
- In office 1957–1962
- Preceded by: M. Nanadass
- Succeeded by: Madala Narayanaswamy
- Constituency: Ongole

Personal details
- Born: 29 August 1922 Pandillapalli, Guntur district, Madras Presidency, British India (presently Andhra Pradesh, India)
- Party: Indian National Congress
- Spouse: Sitharamamma

Ronda Narappa Reddy (born 29 August 1922) was an Indian politician. He was a Member of Parliament, representing Ongole in the Lok Sabha, the lower house of India's Parliament, as a member of the Indian National Congress.
