= Kavali Assembly constituency =

Constituency of the Andhra Pradesh Legislative Assembly, India

Coordinates: 14.91°N 79.99°E

Kavali
- Constituency No. 114 for the Andhra Pradesh Legislative Assembly
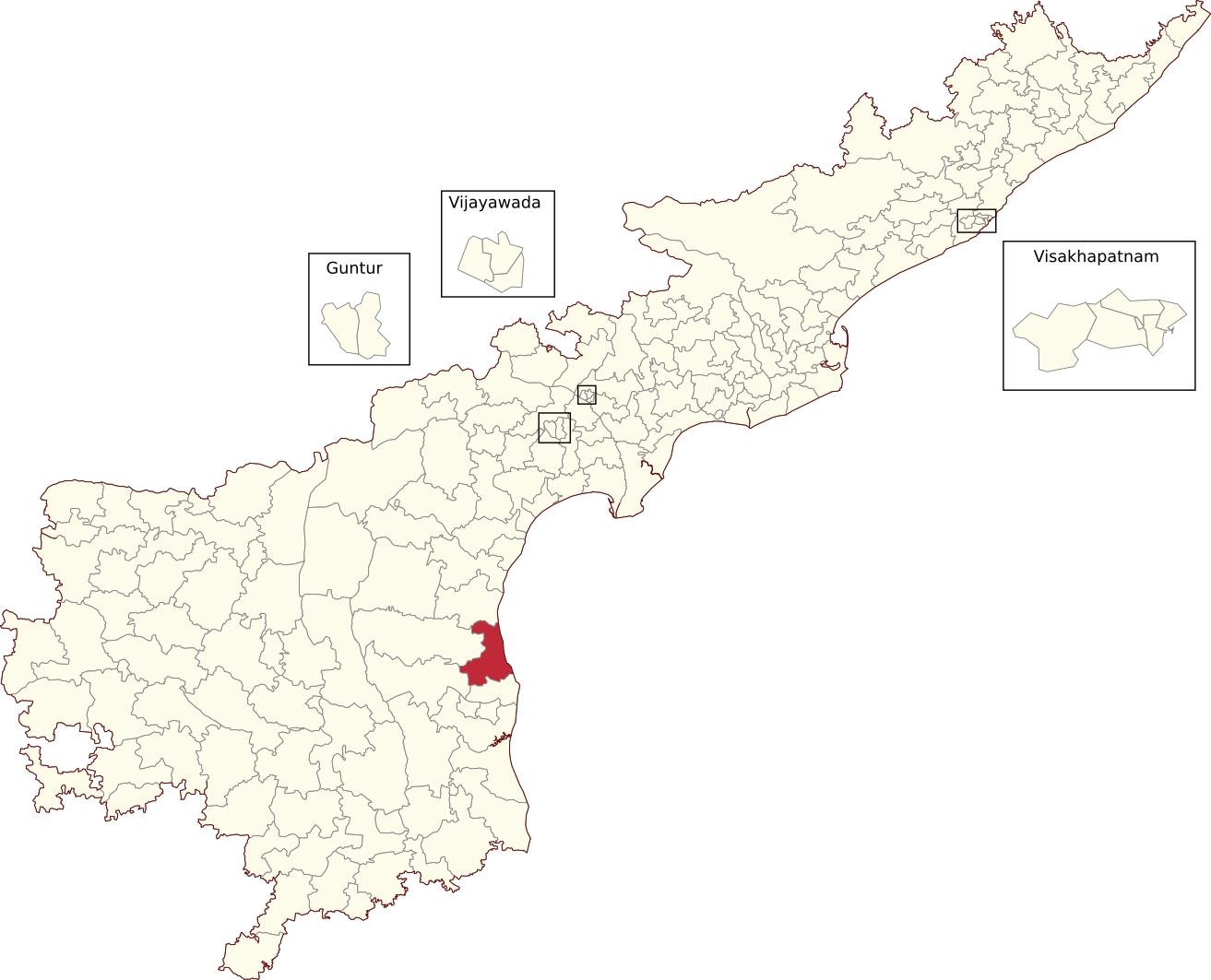
- Location of Kavali Assembly constituency within Andhra Pradesh

Constituency details
- Country: India
- Region: South India
- State: Andhra Pradesh
- District: Nellore
- Lok Sabha constituency: Nellore
- Established: 1951
- Total electors: 229,896
- Reservation: None

Member of Legislative Assembly
- 16th Andhra Pradesh Legislative Assembly
- Incumbent Dagumati Venkata Krishna Reddy
- Party: TDP
- Alliance: NDA
- Elected year: 2024

Kavali Assembly constituency is a constituency in Nellore district of Andhra Pradesh that elects representatives to the Andhra Pradesh Legislative Assembly in India. It is one of the seven assembly segments of Nellore Lok Sabha constituency.

Dagumati Venkata Krishna Reddy is the current MLA of the constituency, having won the 2024 Andhra Pradesh Legislative Assembly election from Telugu Desam Party. As of 2019, there are a total of 229,896 electors in the constituency.

== History of the constituency ==
The constituency was established in 1951, as per the Delimitation Orders (1951). From 1976-2008, it had the following Taluk:

- Kavali Taluk (Excluding Bogole firka)

== Mandals ==
Following the delimitation of the assembly constituencies, since 2008, it comprises the following mandals:

Mandal
Kavali
Bogole
Allur
Dagadarthi

== Members of the Legislative Assembly ==
Year	Member	Political party
1952	B. Ramakrishna Reddy	Kisan Mazdoor Praja Party
1955	B. Ramakrishna Reddy	Praja Party
1962	Yalampalli Penchalaiah	Indian National Congress
1967	Gottipati Subbanaidu	Swatantra Party
1972	Gottipati Kondapa Naidu	Independent
1978	Kaliki Yanadi Reddy	Indian National Congress
1983	Patallapalli Vengalrao	Telugu Desam Party
1985	Kaliki Yanadi Reddy	Indian National Congress
1989	Kaliki Yanadi Reddy	Indian National Congress
1994	Kaliki Yanadi Reddy	Indian National Congress
1999	Vanteru Venugopal Reddy	Telugu Desam Party
2004	Magunta Parvathamma	Indian National Congress
2009	Beeda Masthan Rao	Telugu Desam Party
2014	Ramireddy Pratap Kumar Reddy	YSR Congress Party
2019	Ramireddy Pratap Kumar Reddy	YSR Congress Party
2024	Dagumati Venkata Krishna Reddy	Telugu Desam Party

== Election results ==
=== 2024 ===
2024 Andhra Pradesh Legislative Assembly election: Kavali
Party	Candidate	Votes	%	±%
TDP	Dagumati Venkata Krishna Reddy	106,536	53.27	
YSRCP	Ramireddy Pratap Kumar Reddy	75,588	37.80	
INC	Podalakuri Kalyan	2,340	1.17	
NOTA	None of the above	2,030	1.02	
Majority		30,948	15.47	
Turnout		1,99,982		
TDP gain from YSRCP		Swing		

=== 2019 ===
2019 Andhra Pradesh Legislative Assembly election: Kavali
Party	Candidate	Votes	%	±%
YSRCP	Ramireddy Pratap Kumar Reddy	95,828	49.12%	+0.15%
TDP	Katamreddy Vishnu Vardhan Reddy	81,711	41.89%	−4.27%
JSP	Pasupuleti Sudhakar	10,647	5.46%	+5.46%
BJP	Kandukuri Satyanarayana	2546	1.31%	
Majority		14,117	7.24%	
Turnout		1,97,135	77.17%	−
Registered electors		255,469		
YSRCP hold		Swing		

=== 2014 ===
2014 Andhra Pradesh Legislative Assembly election: Kavali
Party	Candidate	Votes	%	±%
YSRCP	Ramireddy Prathap Kumar Reddy	89,589	48.97	+48.97
TDP	Beedha Masthan Rao	84,620	46.26	+1.51
Majority		4,969	2.71	
Turnout		1,82,939	79.61	+8.78
Registered electors		229,896		
YSRCP gain from TDP		Swing		

=== 2009 ===
2009 Andhra Pradesh Legislative Assembly election: Kavali
Party	Candidate	Votes	%	±%
TDP	Beeda Masthan Rao	69,219	44.75	+4.96
INC	K. Vishnuvardhan Reddy	50,192	32.45	−25.53
PRP	Ramireddy Prathap Kumar Reddy	27,352	17.68	
Majority		19,027	12.30	
Turnout		154,690	70.83	−1.42
Registered electors		218,392		
TDP gain from INC		Swing		

=== 2004 ===
2004 Andhra Pradesh Legislative Assembly election: Kavali
Party	Candidate	Votes	%	±%
INC	Magunta Parvathamma	68,167	57.68	+17.34
TDP	Madala Jankairam	47,018	39.79	−17.02
Majority		21,149	17.89	
Turnout		118,179	72.25	+2.06
Registered electors		223,822		
INC gain from TDP		Swing		

=== 1999 ===
1999 Andhra Pradesh Legislative Assembly election: Kavali
Party	Candidate	Votes	%	±%
TDP	Vanteru Venugopala Reddy	63,630	56.81%	
INC	Kaliki Yanadi Reddy	45,185	40.34%	
Margin of victory		18,445	16.47%	
Turnout		113,893	71.37%	
Registered electors		159,592		
TDP gain from INC		Swing		

=== 1994 ===
1994 Andhra Pradesh Legislative Assembly election: Kavali
Party	Candidate	Votes	%	±%
INC	Kaliki Yanadi Reddy	42,968	40.81%	
TDP	Vanteru Venugopala Reddy	35,528	33.74%	
Margin of victory		7,440	7.07%	
Turnout		107,268	70.47%	
Registered electors		152,214		
INC hold		Swing		

=== 1989 ===
1989 Andhra Pradesh Legislative Assembly election: Kavali
Party	Candidate	Votes	%	±%
INC	Kaliki Yanadi Reddy	54,115	54.28%	
TDP	Pattallapalli Vengala Rao	44,252	44.39%	
Margin of victory		9,863	9.89%	
Turnout		102,785	70.66%	
Registered electors		145,462		
INC hold		Swing		

=== 1985 ===
1985 Andhra Pradesh Legislative Assembly election: Kavali
Party	Candidate	Votes	%	±%
INC	Kaliki Yanadi Reddy	46,286	54.97%	
TDP	Venkata Narayana Muvvala	36,453	43.30%	
Margin of victory		9,833	11.68%	
Turnout		85,350	68.08%	
Registered electors		125,366		
INC gain from TDP		Swing		

=== 1983 ===
1983 Andhra Pradesh Legislative Assembly election: Kavali
Party	Candidate	Votes	%	±%
TDP	Pattallapalli Vengala Rao	42,916	55.11%	
INC	Kaliki Yanadi Reddy	32,744	42.05%	
Margin of victory		10,172	13.06%	
Turnout		79,200	68.62%	
Registered electors		115,410		
TDP gain from INC(I)		Swing		

=== 1978 ===
1978 Andhra Pradesh Legislative Assembly election: Kavali
Party	Candidate	Votes	%	±%
INC(I)	Kaliki Yanadi Reddy	44,456	60.45%	
JP	Gottipati Kondapa Naidu	23,419	31.84%	
Independent	Dama Chenchaiah	2,956	4.02%	
INC	Vanteru Ramana Reddy	1,861	2.53%	
Margin of victory		21,037	28.61%	
Turnout		75,059	74.81%	
Registered electors		100,334		
INC(I) gain from INC		Swing		

=== 1972 ===
1972 Andhra Pradesh Legislative Assembly election: Kavali
Party	Candidate	Votes	%	±%
INC	Gottipati Kondapa Naidu	27,874	50.18%	
Independent	Ayyapareddy Vemireddy	21,425	38.57%	
Margin of victory		6,449	11.61%	
Turnout		56,945	64.58%	
Registered electors		88,180		
INC gain from SWA		Swing		

=== 1967 ===
1967 Andhra Pradesh Legislative Assembly election: Kavali
Party	Candidate	Votes	%	±%
SWA	G Subba Naidu	26,540	52.27%	
INC	G. C Kondaiah	24,231	47.73%	
Margin of victory		2,309	4.55%	
Turnout		52,925	72.17%	
Registered electors		73,331		
SWA gain from INC		Swing		

=== 1962 ===
1962 Andhra Pradesh Legislative Assembly election: Kavali (ST)
Party	Candidate	Votes	%	±%
INC	Yelampalli Penchalaiah	20,558	54.49%	
SWA	Chelamaharla Penchalaiah	14,535	38.52%	
Margin of victory		6,023	15.96%	
Turnout		39,201	54.51%	
Registered electors		71,916		
INC gain from KSP		Swing		

=== 1955 ===
1955 Andhra State Legislative Assembly election: Kavali
Party	Candidate	Votes	%	±%
KSP	Bathena Ramakrishna Reddy	18,295	53.84%	
CPI	Allampati Ramachandra Reddy	15,685	46.16%	
Margin of victory		2,610	7.68%	
Turnout		33,980	53.57%	
Registered electors		63,427		
KSP gain from KMPP		Swing		

=== 1952 ===
1952 Madras State Legislative Assembly election: Kavali
Party	Candidate	Votes	%	±%
KMPP	Bathena Ramakrishna Reddy	31,321	63.78%	
INC	R.Dasaratharami Reddy	15,027	30.60%	
Independent	S. Pitchayya Benjamin	2,757	5.61%	
Margin of victory		16,294	33.18%	
Turnout		49,105	63.96%	
Registered electors		76,773		
KMPP win (new seat)				

== See also ==
- List of constituencies of Andhra Pradesh Vidhan Sabha
