= Dagumati Venkata Krishna Reddy =

Indian politician

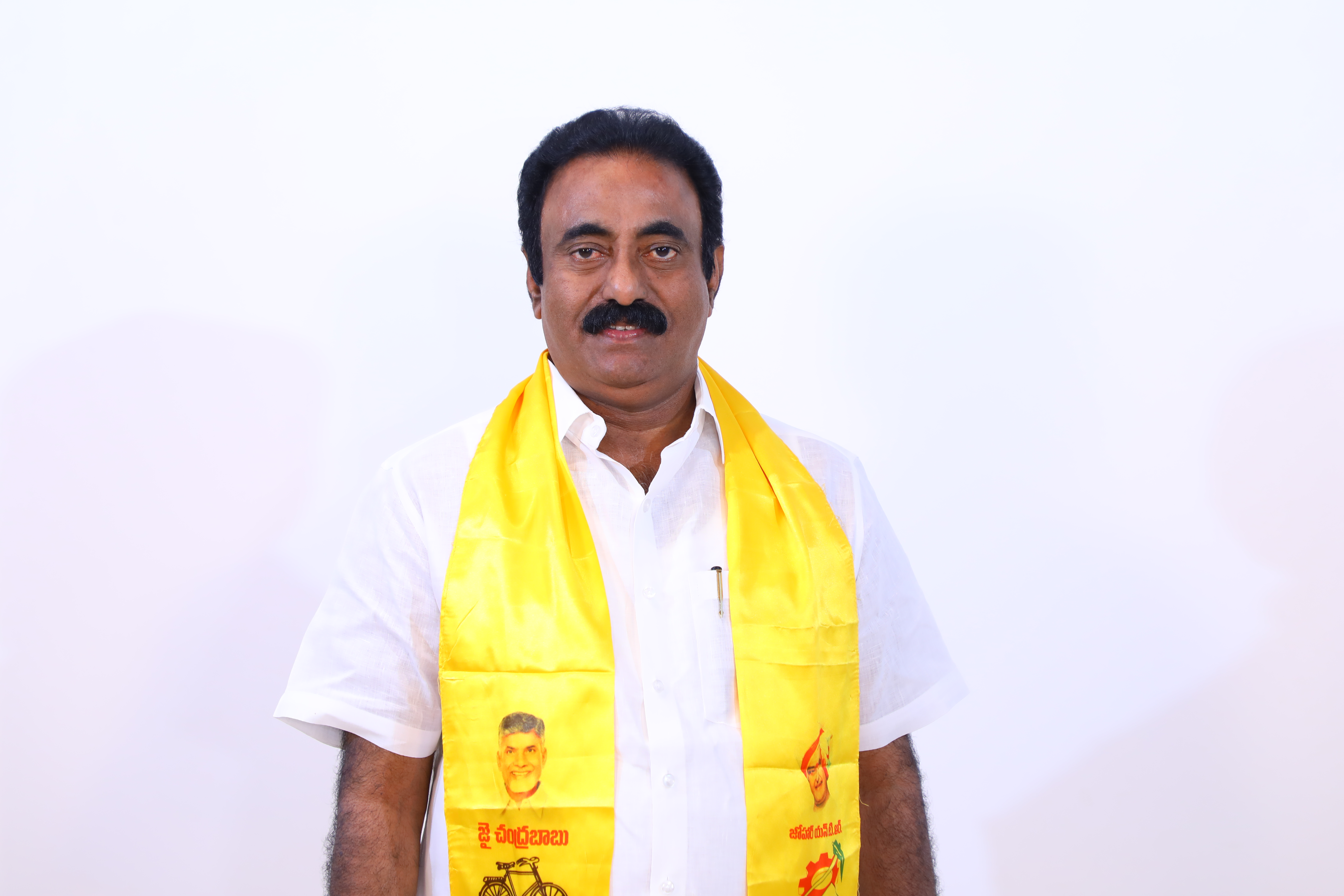

Member of Legislative Assembly Andhra Pradesh
- Incumbent
- Assumed office 2024
- Preceded by: Ramireddy Pratap Kumar Reddy
- Constituency: Kavali

Personal details
- Born: 1966 (age 59–60)
- Party: Telugu Desam Party

Dagumati Venkata Krishna Reddy (born 1966, Brahmanakraka Agraharam), also known as Kavya Krishna Reddy, is an Indian politician from Andhra Pradesh. He is an MLA from Kavali Assembly constituency in Nellore district. He represents Telugu Desam Party. He won the 2024 Andhra Pradesh Legislative Assembly election where TDP had an alliance with BJP and Jana Sena Party.

== Early life and education ==
Reddy is from Kavali. His father Dagumati Lakshmi Reddy was a farmer. He completed his post graduation in commerce in 1990 at SV University, Tirupati.

== Political career ==
Kavya Krishna Reddy won the 2024 Andhra Pradesh Legislative Assembly election from Kavali Assembly constituency representing Telugu Desam Party. He polled 1,06,536 votes and defeated Ramireddy Pratap Kumar Reddy of YSR Congress Party by a margin of 30,948 votes.
