= Allur, Prakasam district =

Allur Akula Alluru
- Village
- Interactive map of Allur
- Location in Andhra Pradesh, India Allur (India)
- Coordinates: 15.44°N 80.16°E
- Country: India
- State: Andhra Pradesh
- District: Prakasam

Languages
  - Official: Telugu
- Time zone: UTC+5:30 (IST)
- PIN: 523286
- Telephone code: 086592

Allur is a village in Kothapatnam mandal, located in Prakasam district of Andhra Pradesh, India.

== Etymology ==
To distinguish it from other Allur, when both villages were in same Nellore district before Ongole district was created, it was called as Akula Allur or Allur with leaves and its namesake was called as Pantala Allur or Allur with staple.

== Geography ==
Allur is located at 15.4926°N 80.0736°E. It is about 16 kilometres (9.9 mi) from Ongole. Vijayawada Airport is the nearest airport; Ongole is the nearest railhead.
