= Allur mandal, Nellore district =

Allur
- Mandal
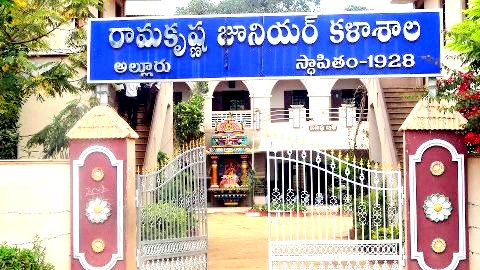
- Ramakrishna Junior College Entrance
- Interactive map of Allur
- Location in Andhra Pradesh, India Allur (India)
- Coordinates: 14.68°N 80.06°E
- Country: India
- State: Andhra Pradesh
- District: Nellore

Area
  - Total: 177.73 km^{2} (68.62 sq mi)

Population (2011)
  - Total: 52,602
  - Density: 295.97/km^{2} (766.55/sq mi)

Languages
  - Official: Telugu
- Time zone: UTC+5:30 (IST)
- PIN: 524315
- Telephone code: +91-8622
- Sex ratio: 1009:1000 ♂/♀

Allur is a mandal in Nellore district of the Indian state of Andhra Pradesh. It is under the administration of Kavali revenue division and the mandal headquarters are located in the town of Allur.

== Geography ==
Allur mandal is bounded by Bogole Mandal towards North, Vidavalur Mandal towards South, Dagadarthi Mandal towards west Kodavalur Mandal towards South. Allur is located at 14°41′N 80°3′E.

== Government ==
Allur was also originally part of Nellore taluk. Kovur taluk was created from Nellore in 1910 and Allur became part of it. These taluks were reorganized as mandals in 1985 and Allur became a mandal.

== Towns and villages ==
As of 2011 census, the mandal has 15 settlements and all are villages.

The settlements in the mandal are listed below:

1. Allur
2. Allurpeta
3. Ananthabotlavari kandrika
4. Batrakagollu
5. Beeramgunta
6. Gogulapalle (East and West)
7. Graddagunta
8. Indupuru
9. Isakapalle
10. Kalambotla Khandrika
11. North Amuluru
12. North Mopuru
13. Purini
14. Singapeta
15. Velicherla

== Demographics ==
As of 2011 the population of Allur mandal was 52,602 with 74,853 households. Male population is 26,272 and females are 26,330 and children are 5,622. The average literacy rate stands at 63.51% with 29,836 literates.

	Census Division	Number of houses	Population	Children(0–6)	Sex Ratio	Children Sex Ratio	Male literacy	Female literacy
1	Allur	3,239	11,656	10.25%	1021	940	73.84%	64.08%
2	Allurpeta	2,173	6,630	10.47%	1037	1081	73.14%	65.41%
3	Ananthabotlavari kandrika	uninhabited						
4	Batrakagollu	520	1,749	8.92%	999	1026	62.78%	49.06%
5	Beeramgunta	557	1,898	9.59%	1011	1022	74.82%	62.99%
6, 7	Gogulapalle (East and West)	1,253	4,384	9.99%	970	1076	69.81%	53.31%
8	Graddagunta	163	616	11.36%	962	892	74.73%	57.99%
9	Indupuru	687	2,524	10.62%	1054	1144	65.67%	55.82%
10	Isakapalle	2,823	10,041	12.22%	968	862	63.17%	48.06%
11	Kalambotla Khandrika	uninhabited						
12	North Amuluru	414	1,671	11.55%	961	804	70.87%	56.89%
13	North Mopuru	1,177	4,151	10.14%	1018	846	65.99%	55.65%
14	Purini	897	3,001	9.56%	980	993	66.33%	53.35%
15	Singapeta	854	2,955	12.01%	1005	940	72.35%	60.89%
16	Velicherla	96	326	9.51%	906	824	70.13%	56.14%

== See also ==
- Beeramgunta Poleramma Temple
