= Madala Narayana Swamy =

Indian politician (1914–2013)

Member of Parliament, Lok Sabha
- In office 1962-1967
- Preceded by: Ronda Narapa Reddy
- Succeeded by: Jaggayya
- Constituency: Ongole

Personal details
- Born: 13 February 1914 Mynampadu, Prakasam district, Madras Presidency, British India (presently Andhra Pradesh, India)
- Died: 9 December 2013 (aged 99) Guntur, Andhra Pradesh, India
- Party: Communist Party of India
- Spouse: Sulochana

Madala Narayana Swamy (13 February 1914 – 9 December 2013) was an Indian politician. He was a Member of Parliament, representing Ongole in the Lok Sabha, the lower house of India's Parliament, as a member of the Communist Party of India.
