= Y. V. Subba Reddy =

Indian politician

Member of Parliament, Rajya Sabha
- Incumbent
- Assumed office 3 April 2024
- Preceded by: Kanakamedala Ravindra Kumar
- Constituency: Andhra Pradesh

Member of Parliament, Lok Sabha
- In office 16 May 2014 – 20 June 2019
- Preceded by: Magunta Sreenivasulu Reddy
- Succeeded by: Magunta Sreenivasulu Reddy
- Constituency: Ongole, Andhra Pradesh

Personal details
- Born: Yerra Venkata Subba Reddy; 1 May 1960 (age 66) Medarametla, Prakasam Dist, Andhra Pradesh
- Party: YSR Congress Party
- Relatives: Balineni Srinivasa Reddy (brother-in-law)
- Education: Bharati Vidyapeeth Institute Of Management and Research; Shivaji University (M.B.A.)
- Website: www.yvsubbareddy.com

Yerram Venkata Subba Reddy is an Indian Politician who served as the Member of Parliament to the 16th Lok Sabha from Ongole (Lok Sabha Constituency), Andhra Pradesh. He won the 2014 Indian General Elections being a Yuvajana Sramika Rythu Congress Party Candidate. In 2019, he has been appointed as the Chairman of Tirumala Tirupati Devasthanams, which is equivalent to Minister rank in Andhra Pradesh Government.

Born in Medarametla, in Prakasam District to Yerram Chinna Poli Reddy and Yerram Pitchamma, he is married to Ms. Swarnalatha Reddy, the younger sister of Ms Y. S. Vijayamma (Mother of Y. S. Jaganmohan Reddy).

He was unanimously elected to the Rajya Sabha, Upper house of Parliament of India in 2024 from Andhra Pradesh in Rajya Sabha Elections as a member of the YSR Congress Party.

== General Elections 2014 ==
General Election, 2014: Ongole
Party	Candidate	Votes	%	±%
YSRCP	Y. V. Subba Reddy	589,960	48.83	N/A
TDP	Magunta Sreenivasulu Reddy	574,302	47.53	+11.12
INC	Darisi Pavana Kumar	13,357	1.11	−42.99
BSP	Krishna Rao Vemula	5,863	0.49	N/A
AAP	Sadam Satyanarayana Raja Yadav	4,393	0.36	N/A
NOTA	None of the Above	5,781	0.48	N/A
Majority		15,658	1.30	−6.39
Turnout		1,208,225	82.17	+7.91
YSRCP gain from INC		Swing		
