= Venkatagiri =

- Town
- Location in Andhra Pradesh, India
- Coordinates: 13.9667°N 79.5833°E
- Country: India
- State: Andhra Pradesh
- District: Tirupati
- Mandal: Venkatagiri

Government
  - Type: Municipality
  - Body: Venkatagiri Municipality

Area
  - Total: 25.89 km^{2} (10.00 sq mi)
- Elevation: 60 m (200 ft)

Population (2011)
  - Total: 52,688
  - Density: 2,035/km^{2} (5,271/sq mi)

Languages
  - Official: Telugu
- Time zone: UTC+5:30 (IST)

Venkatagiri is a town in Tirupati district of the Indian state of Andhra Pradesh. It is a municipality and mandals headquarters of Venkatagiri mandal. Venkatagiri's old name is "Kali Mili". It is notable for its Venkatagiri Handloom Cotton Sarees and Venkatagiri Handloom Silk Sarees and Venkatagiri Silver Zari Sarees. It was part of a small kingdom that was integrated into the Indian Republic.

== History ==
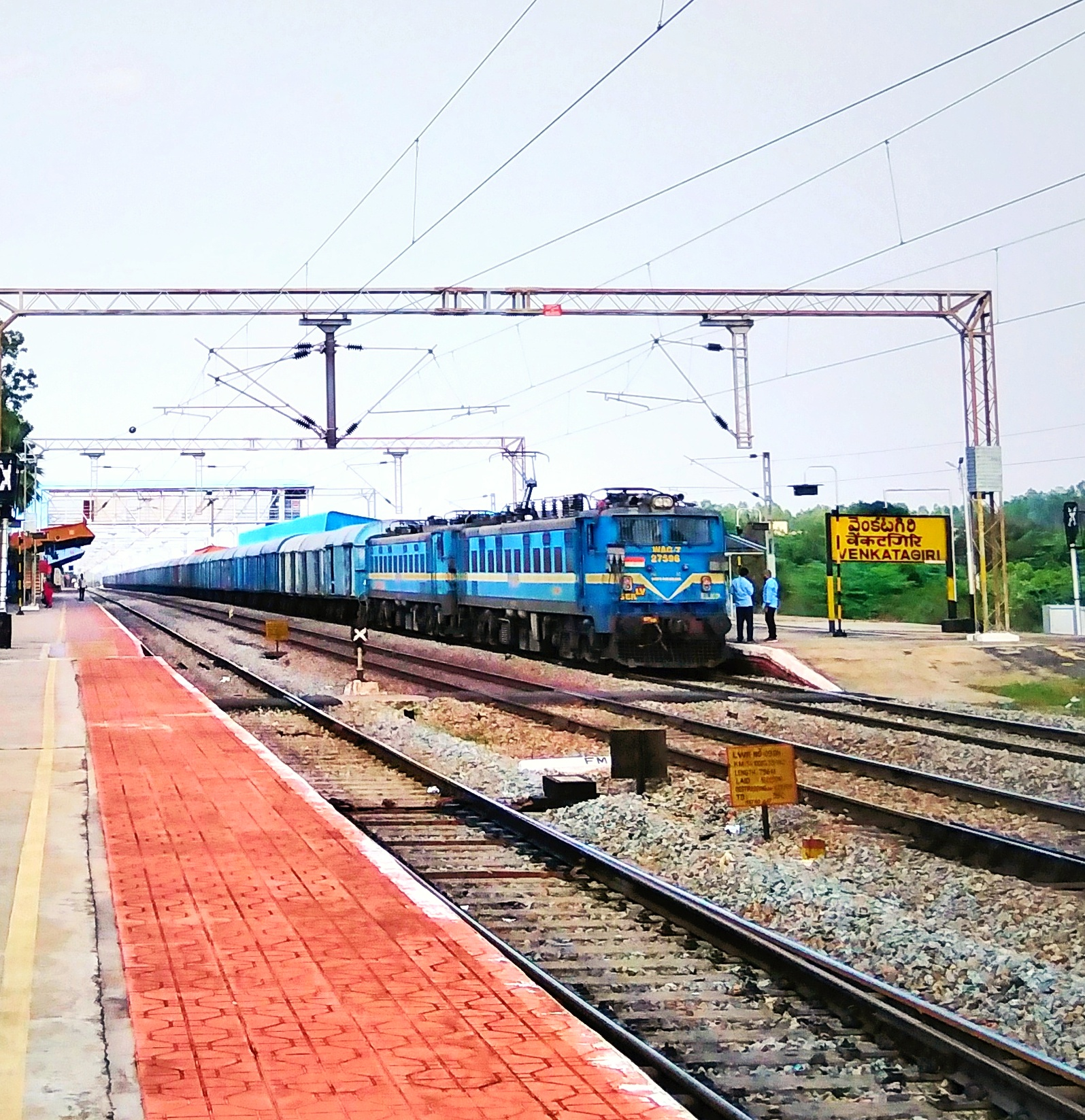
Venkatagiri railway station

Venkatagiri was originally known as Kalimilli until the 17th century and was ruled by Gobburi Polygars under Vijaynagar Empire. They were defeated by Recherla Venkatadri Naidu, Nayak of Madurantakam and the nephew of Raja of Velugodu, another vassal under Venkatapathi Raya II of Aravidu dynasty of Vijayanagar. The village was renamed as Venkatagiri. By mid 17th century the Velogothi rulers shifted their capital to Venkatagiri and it lasted as a Zamindari until independence. It was located between two rivers, i.e., kaivalya river and godderu river.

== Temples ==
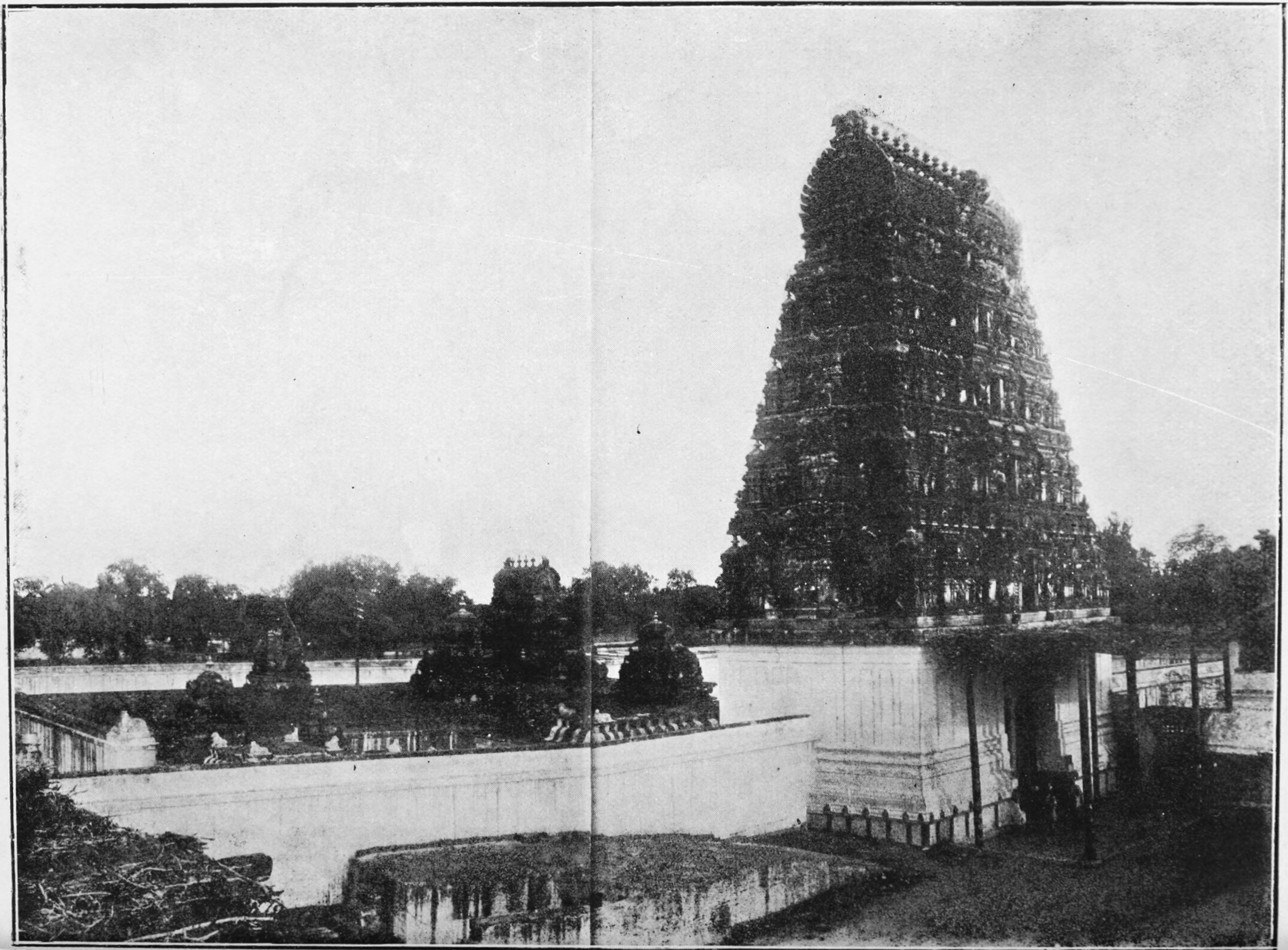
A Temple of Sree-Kasi-Viswanatha Swami at Venkatagiri.

Temples in Vekatagiri : Kashi Vishwanth Temple, Ramalingeswra Swami Temple, Prasanna Venkateswara Swami Temple, Poleramma Temple and Perumalla Swami Temple.

Poleramma jatara is the annual festival in honour of Poleramma.

== Geography ==
Venkatagiri is located at 13.9667°N 79.5833°E. It has an average elevation of 60 metres (197 feet).

== Demographics ==
As of 2001 India census, Venkatagiri Mandal had a population of 200,000. Venkatagiri Rural consists of 58 Revenue Villages. Venkatagiri became amunicipality in 6-1-2005 by merging Venkatagiri, ChevireddiPalli, Periyavaram, Bangarupet, Ammavaripet and Manulalapet Panchayats.Total population of municipality is 52,478. Venkatagiri has an average literacy rate of 67%, higher than the national average of 59.5%. Total area of municipality is 23.50 km^{2}.

== Governance ==
The Venkatagiri municipality was formed as a Grade–III municipality in 2005 and has an extent of 25.43 km^{2} (9.82 sq mi).

== Economy ==
Venkatagiri Saree, woven in and around the town, is one of the geographical indications from Andhra Pradesh and is registered by the Geographical Indications of Goods (Registration and Protection) Act, 1999.

== Politics ==
Venkatagiri falls under Venkatagiri (Assembly constituency) of Andhra Pradesh Legislative Assembly. It is in turn a part of Tirupati (Lok Sabha constituency).

== Education ==
The primary and secondary school education is imparted by government, aided and private schools, under the School Education Department of the state. The medium of instruction followed by different schools are English and Telugu. AP Residential School, RVM High School, RVRKY ZP Girls High School, AP Residential Junior College, IIHT, Visvodaya govt college and ESS Degree colleges are very old institutes in Venkatagiri Town. There is also a Central government school in Venkatagiri, Kendriya Vidhyalaya.

== Transport ==
Venkatagiri railway station is located on Gudur–Katpadi branch line. APSRTC buses, run by state government provide transport to the nearby and long-distance travel.
