= Magunta Subbarama Reddy =

Indian politician (1947–1995)

Member of Parliament, Lok Sabha
- In office 1991-1995
- Preceded by: Mekapati Rajamohan Reddy
- Succeeded by: Magunta Parvathamma
- Constituency: Ongole

Personal details
- Born: 26 November 1947 Nellore, Madras Presidency, Dominion of India (presently Andhra Pradesh, India)
- Died: 1 December 1995 (aged 48) Prakasam district, Andhra Pradesh, India
- Party: Indian National Congress
- Spouse: Magunta Parvathamma

Magunta Subbarama Reddy (26 November 1947 – 1 December 1995) was an Indian politician, liquor baron, and newspaper publisher. He served as a Member of Parliament (MP) representing Ongole in the Lok Sabha, the lower house of India's Parliament, as a member of the Indian National Congress (INC). Subbarama Reddy was also the owner of Udayam newspaper, which he acquired from its founder Dasari Narayana Rao in the early 1990s, and continued to oversee until its closure in 1995. He was assassinated by Naxalites in 1995.

He was the elder brother of Magunta Sreenivasulu Reddy, who also became a prominent politician and an MP.

== Background ==
Magunta Subbarama Reddy, originally from Nellore district, began his political career in the Prakasam district, representing the Ongole constituency as a member of the Indian National Congress. The Magunta family is known for their significant influence in the Prakasam and Nellore districts of Andhra Pradesh.

== Politics ==
In 1991, Subbarama Reddy contested and won the Lok Sabha seat from Ongole as a Congress candidate, marking his entry into national politics. His political legacy was continued by his family members, notably his widow, Magunta Parvatamma, who successfully contested the Ongole MP seat in 1996 as a Congress candidate after his death. In 1998, his brother, Magunta Sreenivasulu Reddy, also won the Ongole seat, further solidifying the Magunta family’s influence in Andhra Pradesh’s political landscape.

== Publishing ==
In 1991, Subbarama Reddy acquired Udayam, a prominent Telugu daily newspaper founded by filmmaker Dasari Narayana Rao. With ambitions to expand Udayam's reach across Andhra Pradesh, he also planned to revive the historic Andhra Patrika and launch a new English-language daily. To support these ventures, he invested in advanced printing technology. However, his publishing efforts faced financial strain due to the alcohol prohibition imposed in Andhra Pradesh, which heavily impacted his liquor business—a primary revenue source supporting his media investments. By 1995, Udayam had accumulated significant financial losses, a decline in readership, and substantial debt, leading to its closure on May 23, 1995.

== Death ==
On 1 December 1995, Subbarama Reddy, along with his gunman, Ch. Venkataratnam, were shot dead in the former's house by members of the People's War Group (PWG).

In 2009, the Supreme Court upheld the life sentence of Patangi Balarama Venkata Ganesh for his role in the killing, citing strong evidence. However, the court dismissed the CBI's appeal against the acquittal of his co-accused, Vistaria Prakash, due to insufficient evidence.
