= Kanakamedala Ravindra Kumar =

Indian politician

K. Ravindra Kumar

Member of Parliament, Rajya Sabha
- In office 3 April 2018 – 2 April 2024
- Preceded by: Renuka Chowdhary
- Succeeded by: Y. V. Subba Reddy
- Constituency: Andhra Pradesh

Personal details
- Born: 8 August 1956 (age 70) Avanigadda
- Party: Telugu Desam Party

K. Raveendra Kumar is a member of the Telugu Desam Party (TDP). On 15 March 2018 he was elected unopposed to the Rajya Sabha from the state of Andhra Pradesh.
