= Vidavalur =

Vidavaluru
- Village
- Interactive map of Vidavaluru
- Location in Andhra Pradesh, India Vidavaluru (India)
- Coordinates: 14°35′39″N 80°01′47″E
- Country: India
- State: Andhra Pradesh
- District: Nellore
- Talukas: Vidavaluru

Languages
  - Official: Telugu
- Time zone: UTC+5:30 (IST)
- PIN: 524318

Vidavaluru is a village and a mandal headquarters in Nellore district in the state of Andhra Pradesh in India. It is located in Kovur.

== History ==
Vidavaluru is a village panchayat located in the Nellore district of Andhra Pradesh. Its latitude is 14.5721409 and its longitude is 80.0661975.

== Politics ==
Vidavalur is represented by Kovur for the Andhra Pradesh Legislative Assembly. Vemireddy Prashanthi Reddy is the current MLA of Kovur (Assembly constituency) representing the Telugu Desam Party .
