= Allur Assembly constituency =

Constituency of the Andhra Pradesh legislative assembly, India

Coordinates: 18.68°N 79.53°E

Allur
- Former constituency for the Andhra Pradesh Legislative Assembly

Constituency details
- Country: India
- Region: South India
- State: Andhra Pradesh
- District: Nellore
- Established: 1967
- Abolished: 2008
- Reservation: None

Allur was a constituency of the Andhra Pradesh Legislative Assembly, India until 2008.

== Overview ==
It was part of Nellore Lok Sabha constituency along with other six Vidhan Sabha segments, namely, Kandukur, and Kavali, Atmakur, Nellore City, Nellore Rural and Udayagiri in Nellore district.

== Members of Legislative Assembly ==
Year	Member	Political party
1967	Bezawada Papi Reddy	Kisan Mazdoor Praja Party
1972	Rebala Dasaradha Ramireddy	Indian National Congress
1978	Giddaluru Sundara Ramaiah	Indian National Congress
1983	Bezawada Papireddy	Telugu Desam Party
1985	Jakka Venkayya	Communist Party of India (Marxist)
1989	Katamreddy Vishnuvardhan Reddy	Indian National Congress
1994	Jakka Venkayya	Communist Party of India (Marxist)
1999	Adala Prabhakar Reddy	Telugu Desam Party
2004	Katamreddy Vishnuvardhan Reddy	Indian National Congress

== Election results ==
=== 1994 ===
1994 Andhra Pradesh Legislative Assembly election: Allur
Party	Candidate	Votes	%	±%
CPI(M)	Jakka Venkayya	42,806	47.18	
INC	Katamreddy Vishnuvardhan Reddy	40,906	45.09	
BJP	Alampati Sitarami Reddy	4877	5.38	
Majority		1,900	2.09	
Turnout		90730	70.56	+0.59
CPI(M) gain from INC		Swing		

== See also ==
- List of constituencies of Andhra Pradesh Vidhan Sabha
