= Poleramma Jatara, Venkatagiri =

Poleramma Jatara is a festival in Venkatagiri in honour of Poleramma. It is celebrated every year by Venkatagiri citizens and people from nearby villages and cities like Nellore, Tirupati, Sri Kalahasti and Chennai. In 2024 it obtained recognition as an Andhra Pradesh State Festival.

== History ==
The festival has its origin in the mid-18th century during the reign of the Venkatagiri rajas. Local people believe that Poleramma herself came and would talk with the rajas during the time of festival. It is usually held every year on 3rd Wednesday and Thursday after Vinkayaka Chaturthi.
