= Bezawada Papi Reddy =

Indian politician (1927–2002)

Member of Parliament, Lok Sabha
- In office 1984–1989
- Preceded by: Puli Venkata Reddy
- Succeeded by: Mekapati Rajamohan Reddy
- Constituency: Ongole

Member of Parliament, Rajya Sabha
- In office 10 April 1972 – 9 April 1978
- Preceded by: Yasoda Reddy
- Succeeded by: N. P. Chengalaraya Naidu
- Constituency: Andhra Pradesh

Member of Legislative Assembly Andhra Pradesh
- In office 1983–1984
- Preceded by: Giddaluru Sundara Ramaiah
- Succeeded by: Jakka Venkayya
- Constituency: Allur
- In office 1967–1972
- Preceded by: Constituency Established
- Succeeded by: Rebala Dasaradha Rami Reddy
- Constituency: Allur

Member of Legislative Council Andhra Pradesh
- In office 1958–1962
- Chairman: Medapati Hanumanth Rao
- Leader of the House: Neelam Sanjiva Reddy; Damodaram Sanjivayya
- Constituency: Nellore

Personal details
- Born: 5 January 1927 Kovur, Nellore district
- Died: 7 January 2002 (aged 75) Hyderabad
- Party: Telugu Desam Party (1982-2002)
- Other political affiliations: Kisan Mazdoor Praja Party; Independent
- Spouse: Prameela
- Children: 2 Sons, 1 Daughter
- Education: Presidency College, Chennai

Bezawada Papi Reddy B.Sc. (5 Jan, 1927 – 7 Jan, 2002) was a politician. He was a Member of Parliament representing Andhra Pradesh in the Rajya Sabha and also 8th Lok Sabha.

== Birth and education ==
He was born on 5 January 1927 to Sri Bezawada Ramachandra Reddy & Smt Bujjamma as their eldest son at Kovur, Nellore district. After pursuing his schooling at Buchireddipalem he went on to complete his graduation at the Presidency College, Madras.

== Family ==
He was married to Athipalli Pramila on 15 August 1948, he had three children Sashikala a daughter being the eldest child, Dr. Sudhir Kumar Reddy, who studied medicine in Rangaraya Medical college Kakinada and Ramesh Chandra Reddy a REC Warangal product being the two sons. All his children are settled outside India.

== Political life ==
He started his career in politics at a young age by first becoming a member of the Student Congress from 1942 to 1947.

He became a legislator in 1958 having been elected to the AP Legislative counsel and served as MLC till 1962.

He assisted his father Sri Ramachandra Reddy who was at that time active in Swatantra Party.

Papi Reddy was elected to the AP Legislative Assembly twice first in 1967–72 as an independent and later in 1983 as a candidate of Telugu Desam party, both the times from the Alluru constituency.

He served on the board of the Agricultural University from 1969 to 1972

In the year 1972 after serving his first term as a MLA, He chose to go to the parliament and was elected as an Independent to be a member of the Rajya Sabha.

He believed in the socialist policies as prescribed by Lok Nayak Jayaprakash Narayan. He was under intensive observation by the security agencies during the emergency in 1975–77.

He served as a house committee member in Public Undertakings Committee, 1976–77, and Public Accounts Committee, 1977–78.

His tenure in Rajya Sabha was during 1972–78.

Being the founder member of the party Telugu Desam Party went by his suggestion to select Cycle as its party symbol (which incidentally was his symbol, when he contested as an Independent), which continues to be the party symbol till date.

When he was offered to join the first Non Congress Government being formed under the Chief Ministership of N T Rama Rao he suggested they make his friend Nallapareddy Srinivasulu Reddy a minister instead.

On the insistence of NTR he accepted to become the Chairman of APIDC and served on the board 1983–84.

He was the founding Vice President of the Telugu Desam Party, and during the Nadendla Bhaskara Rao rebellion, he played a very effective role in keeping together all the MLA's of TDP who were in favour of NTR in the camps held at Bangalore and Mysore.

In the year 1984, he contested from the Ongole Lok Sabha constituency as a member of TeluguDesam party and won against Puli Venkata Reddy of INC and was a member of the 8th Lok Sabha till it was dissolved in 1989.

Last time he went to the polls was when he was asked to contest against his best friend Nallapareddy Srinivasulu Reddy from the Kovur Constituency as an MLA in 1989 on Telugu Desam Party ticket and lost a battle which he was not interested from the beginning.

== Social life ==
He has acquaintances across party lines, and some industrialists were among his associates.

== Death ==
He died following a Cardiac arrest on 7 January 2002 in Hyderabad 7 January 2002 two days after he completed his 75th year. He left behind his Widow and three children and 5 grandsons
