= Telugu Yuvata =

Youth wing

Telugu Yuvatha తెలుగు యువత
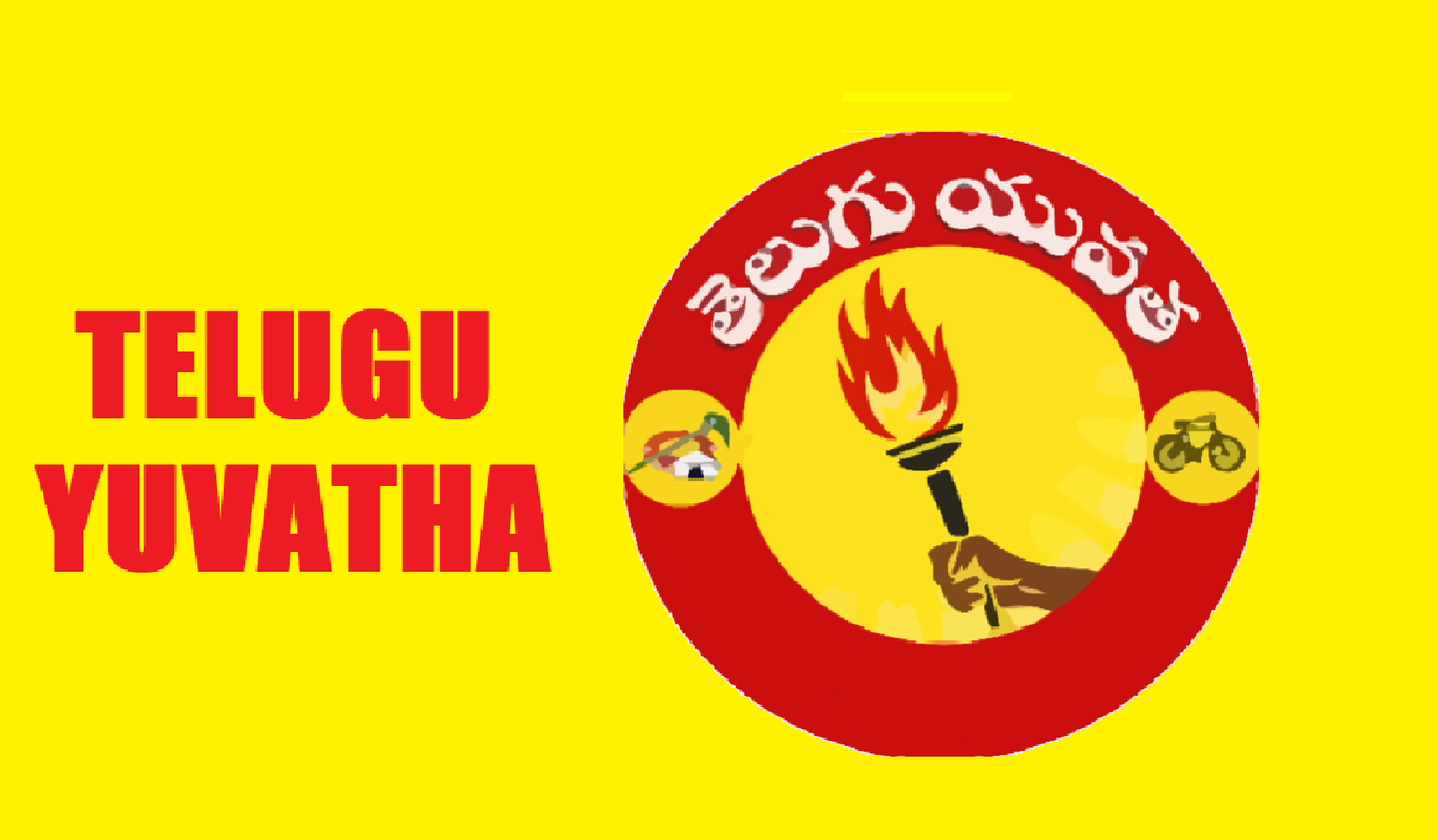
- President: Sri Ram Chinnababu Andhrapradesh; Pogaku Jairam Telangana
- Headquarters: NTR Bhavan, Vijayawada.
- Colours: Yellow
- State party: Telugu Desam Party
- Website: https://www.telugudesam.org/

Telugu Yuvatha (translation: Telugu Youth) is the youth wing of the Telugu Desam Party in India.

Leader of Telugu Yuvatha of Telugu Desam Party in Andhra Pradesh is 'Sri Ram Chinnababu' from Madanapalle constituency.
