= Maddipadu =

- Village
- Interactive map of Maddipadu
- Location in Andhra Pradesh, India Maddipadu (India)
- Coordinates: 15.6222°N 80.0230°E
- Country: India
- State: Andhra Pradesh
- District: Prakasam
- Mandal: Maddipadu

Languages
  - Official: Telugu
- Time zone: UTC+5:30 (IST)
- Vehicle registration: AP

Maddipadu is a village in Prakasam district of the Indian state of Andhra Pradesh. It is the mandal headquarters of Maddipadu mandal in Ongole revenue division.
