= Mekapati Rajamohan Reddy =

Indian politician (born 1944)

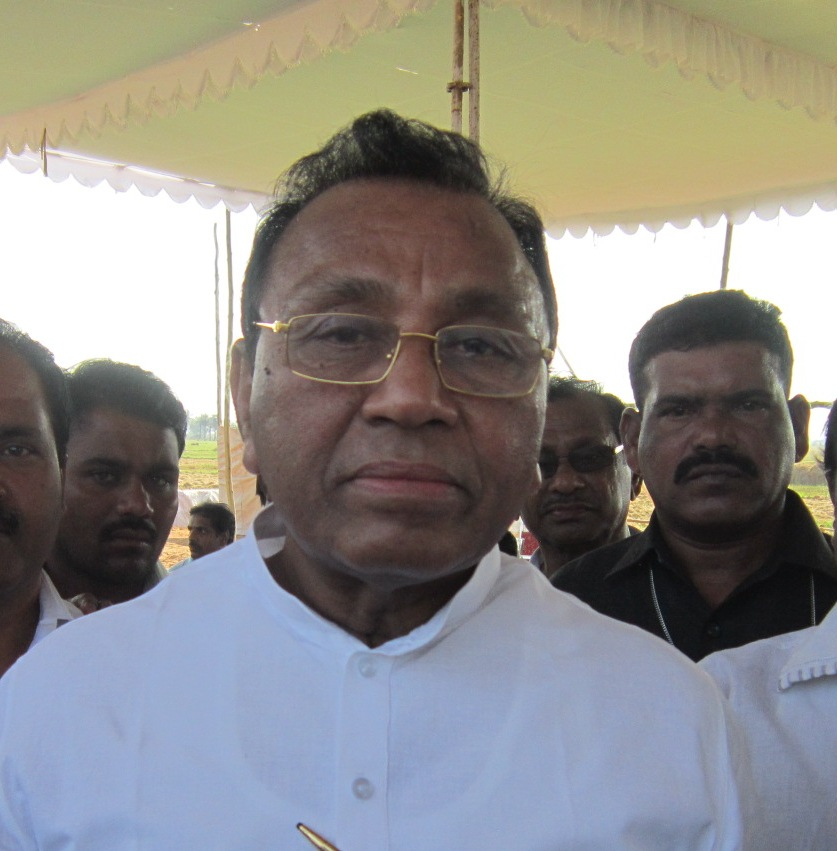

Member of Parliament, Lok Sabha
- In office 2009–2019
- Preceded by: Panabaka Lakshmi
- Succeeded by: Adala Prabhakara Reddy
- Constituency: Nellore
- In office 2004–2009
- Preceded by: Nedurumalli Janardhana Reddy
- Succeeded by: Modugula Venugopala Reddy
- Constituency: Narasaraopet
- In office 1989–1991
- Preceded by: Bezawada Papi Reddy
- Succeeded by: Magunta Subbarama Reddy
- Constituency: Ongole

Member of Legislative Assembly United Andhra Pradesh
- In office 1985–1989
- Preceded by: Venkaiah Naidu
- Succeeded by: Madala Janakiram
- Constituency: Udayagiri

Personal details
- Born: 11 June 1944 (age 82) Nellore, Andhra Pradesh
- Party: YSR Congress Party
- Other political affiliations: Indian National Congress; Telugu Desam Party
- Spouse: Mekapati Manimanjari
- Children: 1 daughter and 3 sons
- Education: Bachelor of Engineering in Civil Engineering
- Alma mater: Osmania University
- As of 16 September, 2006

Mekapati Rajamohan Reddy (born 11 June 1944) is a former member of the 9th Lok Sabha, 14th Lok Sabha, 15th Lok Sabha of India. He represented the Nellore Loksabha Constituency in Andhra Pradesh and is a member of the YSR Congress.

Reddy lost an election contest in 1983 as an Indian National Congress (INC) candidate. In 1985 he was elected to the Andhra Pradesh Legislative Assembly as a candidate of the same party, and in 1989 he became an INC member of the Lok Sabha. He stood again for parliament in 1996, and 1998 as MP candidate from Ongole parliamentary constituency, both times as a Telugu Desam Party candidate. Those attempts were unsuccessful in 2004 from Narasaraopet parliamentary constituency and in 2009 elections from Nellore parliamentary constituency as INC candidate, winning on both occasions. Reddy then became a member of the YSR Congress and was re-elected to the 15th Lok Sabha in a by-election. He was elected as Leader in Lok Sabha from YSRCP Party.

== Politics ==
- 1985—Member of Andhra Pradesh Legislative Assembly Udayagiri.
- 2004—Member of 14th Lok Sabha from Narasaraopet.
- 2009—Member of 15th Lok Sabha from Nellore.
- 2011—Member of 15th Lok Sabha from Nellore from YSR Congress.

Party political offices
Preceded by Jagan Mohan Reddy	Leader of the YSR Congress Party in the 16th Lok Sabha; 2014–2019	Incumbent
