= Medarametla =

Medarametla మేదరమెట్ల
- Village
- Location in Andhra Pradesh, India
- Coordinates: 15°43′29″N 80°01′10″E
- Country: India
- State: Andhra Pradesh
- District: Prakasam
- Mandal: Korisapadu

Government
  - Type: Gram Panchayat
  - Body: Medarametla Gram Panchayat

Area
  - Total: 16 km^{2} (6.2 sq mi)

Population (2011)
  - Total: 8,722
  - Density: 550/km^{2} (1,400/sq mi)

Languages
  - Official: Telugu
- Time zone: UTC+5:30 (IST)
- PIN: 523212
- Vehicle registration: AP-27
- Nearest city: Ongole
- Lok Sabha constituency: Bapatla
- Assembly constituency: Addanki

Medarametla is a major village and Gram Panchayat in Korisapadu mandal of Prakasam district, in the Indian state of Andhra Pradesh. The village is situated on National Highway 16 and near the junction with the Narketpally–Addanki–Medarametla Road (NAM Expressway), making it an important transportation and commercial centre in the

== History ==
Medarametla developed as an important rural settlement due to its strategic location on the Chennai–Kolkata highway corridor.

Between 1949 and 1986, local leaders including Yarram Koti Reddy and Manne Sitaramaiah contributed to the village's development through improvements in public infrastructure and community welfare.

Following a period of relatively slow development between 1986 and 2001, several infrastructure projects were undertaken, including the construction of cement roads and expansion of residential layouts. Land values increased considerably after the construction of the highway bypass.

In 2013, a chilli oil extraction plant was established near Tammavaram Road, providing employment opportunities for more than 600 people.

== Geography ==
Medarametla is located at 15°43′N 80°01′E in the coastal plains of Andhra Pradesh.

The village covers an area of approximately 16 km² and lies at an elevation of about 34 metres above mean sea level.

=== Nearby villages ===
- Korisapadu – 4 km
- Kothakota – 4 km
- Bodduvanipalem – 5 km
- Ravinuthala – 5 km
- Kurravanipalem – 7 km

== Demographics ==
According to the 2011 Census of India, Medarametla had a population of 8,722, comprising 4,386 males and 4,336 females. Telugu is the official and most widely spoken language.

== Administration ==
Medarametla was constituted as a Major Gram Panchayat on 26 July 1959.

The village is administered under the Panchayati Raj system through the Medarametla Gram Panchayat.

It falls under:

- Korisapadu mandal
- Addanki Assembly constituency
- Bapatla Lok Sabha constituency

== Economy ==
Agriculture is the principal occupation of the residents.

Major crops include:

- Pulses
- Vegetables
- Tobacco
- Cotton
- Chilli

The village has also developed into a commercial hub owing to its location on NH-16. Transport businesses, automobile workshops, warehouses, hotels, fuel stations and agricultural trading centres contribute significantly to the local economy.

== Education ==
Educational institutions in Medarametla include:

- Zilla Parishad High School (ZPHS)
- Sarada Degree College
- Nagarjuna High School
- Geetam High School
- St. Arnolds High School
- Montisorri High School

== Infrastructure ==
=== Transportation ===
Medarametla is located adjacent to the junction of NH-16 and the Narketpally–Addanki–Medarametla Road (NAM Expressway).

APSRTC operates regular bus services connecting the village with Ongole, Addanki, Guntur, Vijayawada, Srisailam, Tirupathi, Banglore and Hyderabad.

The nearest railway station is Ongole, approximately 25 km away.

=== Drinking water ===
A protected drinking water project costing approximately ₹4.5 crore was constructed on the Tammavaram Road. The scheme draws water from the Gundlakamma Reservoir and supplies treated drinking water to Medarametla and around 22 surrounding villages.

=== Healthcare ===
Healthcare facilities include:

- Sri Yarram China Poli Reddy Government Primary Health Centre
- Jayanthi Nursing Home
- Charan Nursing Home
- Chandra Hospital

== Places of worship ==
Major temples and religious centres include:

- Sri Bhu Neela Sametha Sri Venkateswara Swamy Temple
- Sri Ganga Bhramaramba Sametha Sri Malleswara Swamy Temple
- Sri Shirdi Sai Mandir
- Sri Kodandarama Swamy Temple
- Abhaya Anjaneya Swamy Temple

== Nearby places ==
- Addanki – 10 km
- Ongole – 25 km
- Chirala – 41 km
- Narasaraopet – 48 km
- Bapatla – 54 km
- Guntur – 85 km
- Vijayawada – 119 km

Nearby tourist attractions include Suryalanka Beach and Vodarevu Beach.

== Notable people ==
- Y. V. Subba Reddy – Politician, former Member of Parliament and former Chairman of the Tirumala Tirupati Devasthanams.

== See also ==
- Korisapadu
- Prakasam district
- National Highway 16 (India)
- Narketpally–Addanki–Medarametla Road
