= Bogole, Nellore district =

Bogole
- Village
- Interactive map of Bogole
- Location in Andhra Pradesh, India Bogole (India)
- Coordinates: 14°46′1″N 79°58′47″E
- Country: India
- State: Andhra Pradesh
- District: Nellore
- Talukas: Bogole

Languages
  - Official: Telugu
- Time zone: UTC+5:30 (IST)
- PIN: 524142

Bogole is a village and a Mandal headquarter in Nellore district in the state of Andhra Pradesh in India. It forms a part of Nellore Urban Development Authority.
