= Poleramma =

Regional Hindu goddess

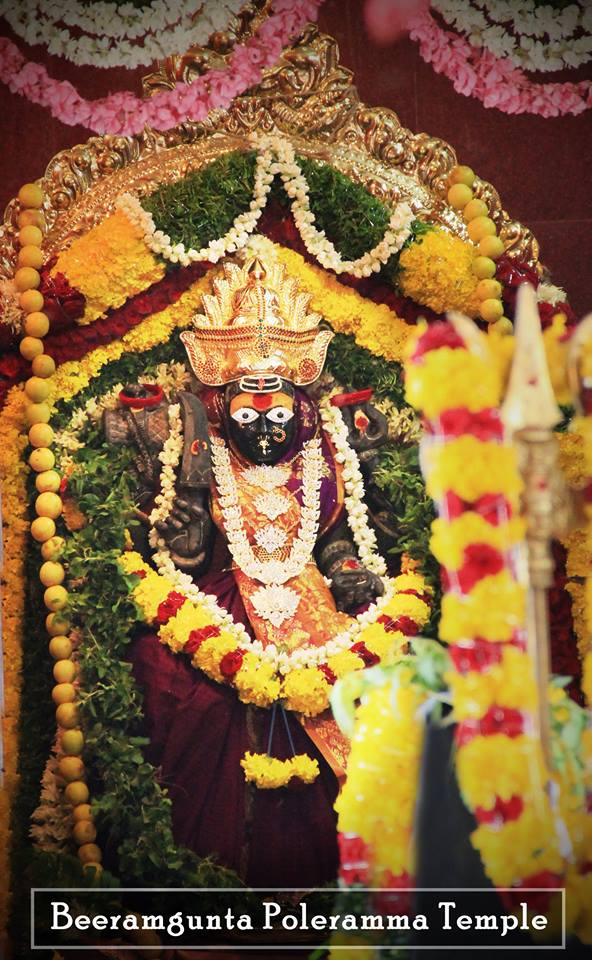
- Murti of Poleramma at the Beeramgunta temple, Nellore
- Affiliation: Devi

Genealogy
- Siblings: Pothuraju (brother)

Poleramma (Telugu: పోలేరమ్మ) is a Hindu goddess of plague and smallpox. She is predominantly worshipped in the villages of Andhra Pradesh, and is regarded as a regional consort of Shiva.

== Description ==
Poleramma is worshipped as a village goddess whose role is to server as the protector of the village. Her shrine is usually present outside the boundaries of the village, and often appears crudely built with mud and stones and worshipped in the form of a small stone in the form of a Linga. She is considered a goddess of smallpox, and is associated with the goddess Mariamman of Tamil Nadu. She is regarded to oversee cattle disease, drought, and general health welfare. According to Yanadi tradition, the goddess causes smallpox to her adherents when she is not offered veneration. She is venerated by the community on a fixed day in a special hut after they are cured of the disease.

== Legend ==
Poleramma is regarded to be one of the seven sister-goddesses worshipped by adherents in rural Andhra Pradesh, having a brother named Pothuraju. It is generally believed that one day Goddess Parvati took seven gulps of water for drinking from a lake and that was not an ordinary lake but in that lake the energy of Goddess Lakshmi was present due to the gulps from Goddess Parvati's mouth came 7 drops of water and from here the 7 sisters Poleramma, Ankamma, Mutyalamma, Pochamma, Bangaramma, Maramma, and Yellamma were born and Pothuraju was assigned to guard them.

== Festival ==
The Poleramma Jatara festival is dedicated to Poleramma, lasting three days. A buffalo is sacrificed as an offering to the goddess, its blood poured into a pot and ritually scattered around the village.
