= Jangaon mandal =

Jangaon
- Mandal/Tehsil/Taluka
- Location in Telangana, India
- Coordinates: 17.72°N 79.18°E
- Country: India
- State: Telangana
- District: Jangaon district
- Elevation: 382 m (1,253 ft)

Population (2011)
  - Total: 92,446

Languages
  - Official: Telugu
- Time zone: UTC+5:30 (IST)
- PIN: 506 167 & 201
- Telephone code: 91–8716
- Vehicle registration: TG-27
- Website: jangaon.telangana.gov.in/maps/

Jangaon Mandal (also known as tehsil, tahsil, taluka or taluq) is an administrative division or Sub District in Jangaon district in the Indian state of Telangana.

== Geography ==
Jangaon Mandal is located on the eastern Deccan Plateau and has an average elevation of 382 metres (1,253 ft).

== History ==
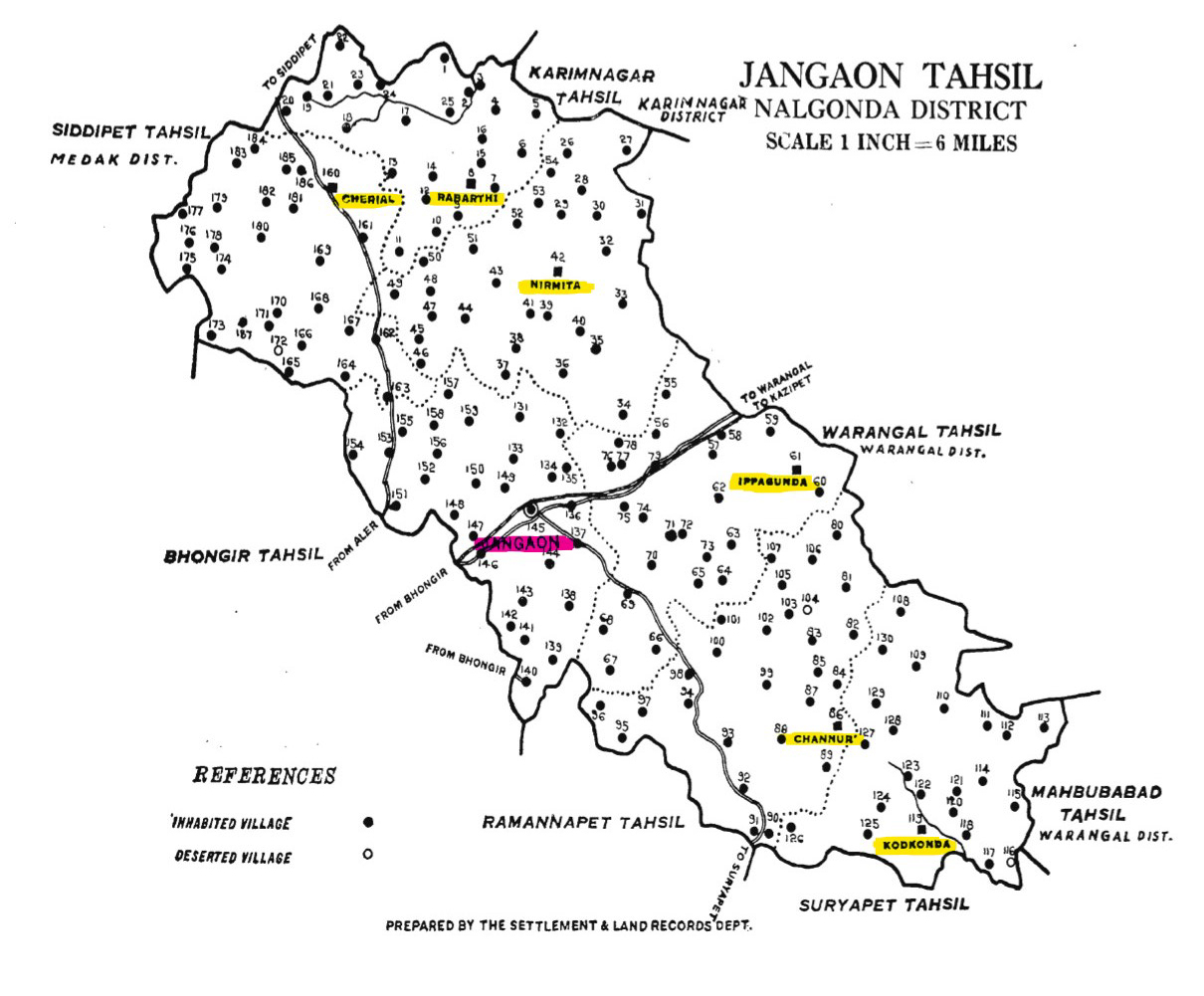
Jangaon Taluk with Circles 1951

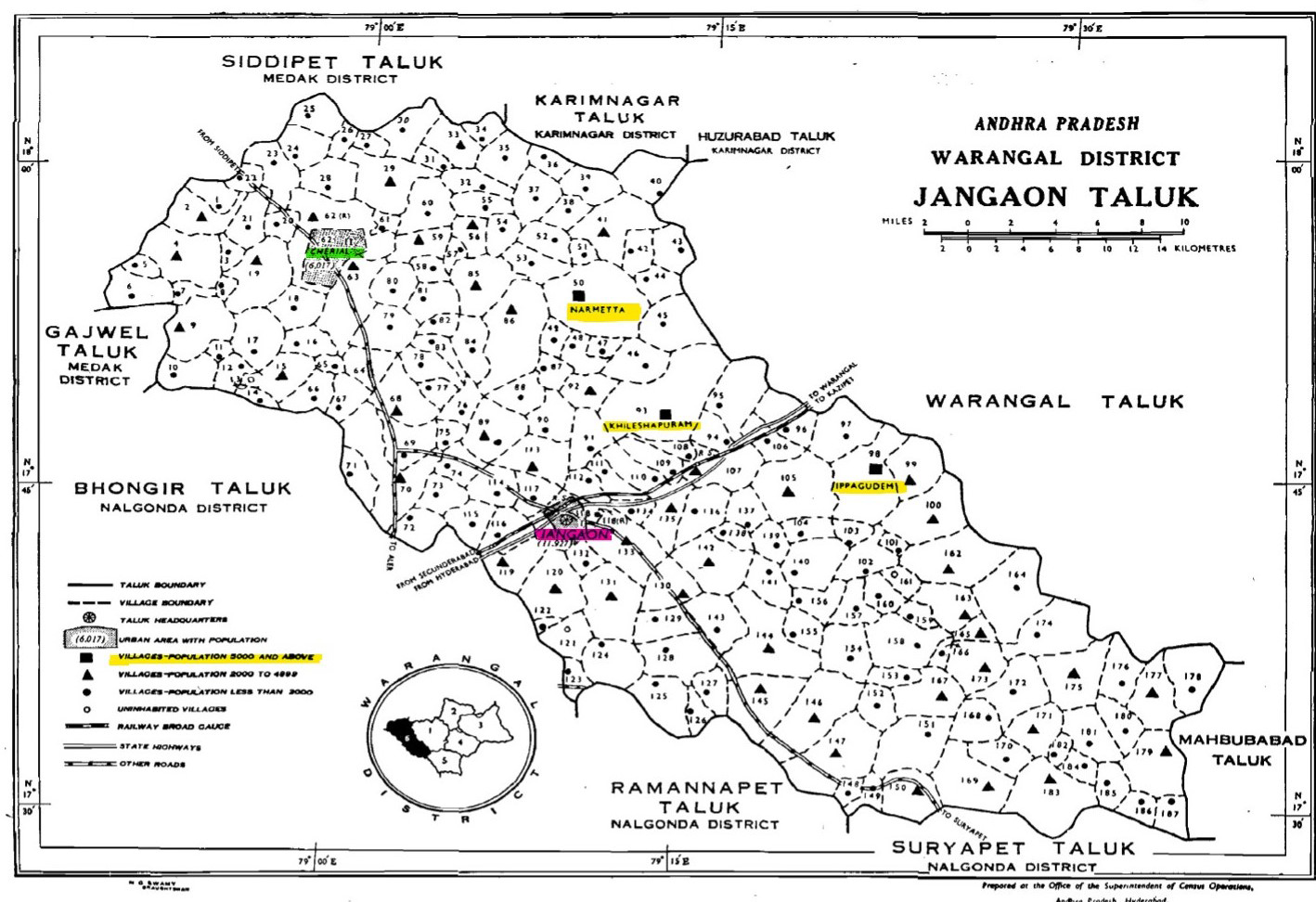
Jangaon Taluk census 1961

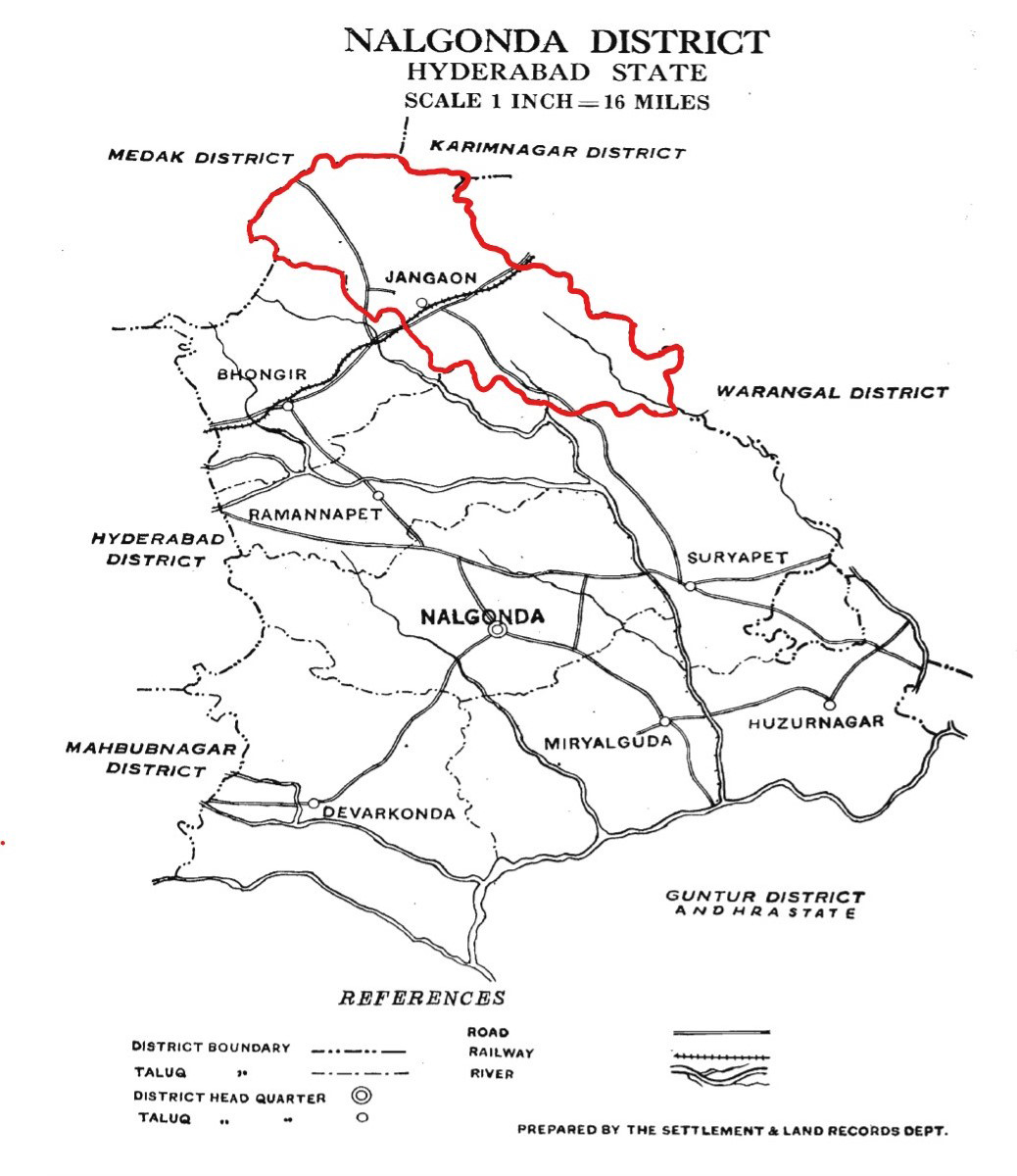
Jangaon Taluk 1951 in Nalgonda District (1905 to 1953)

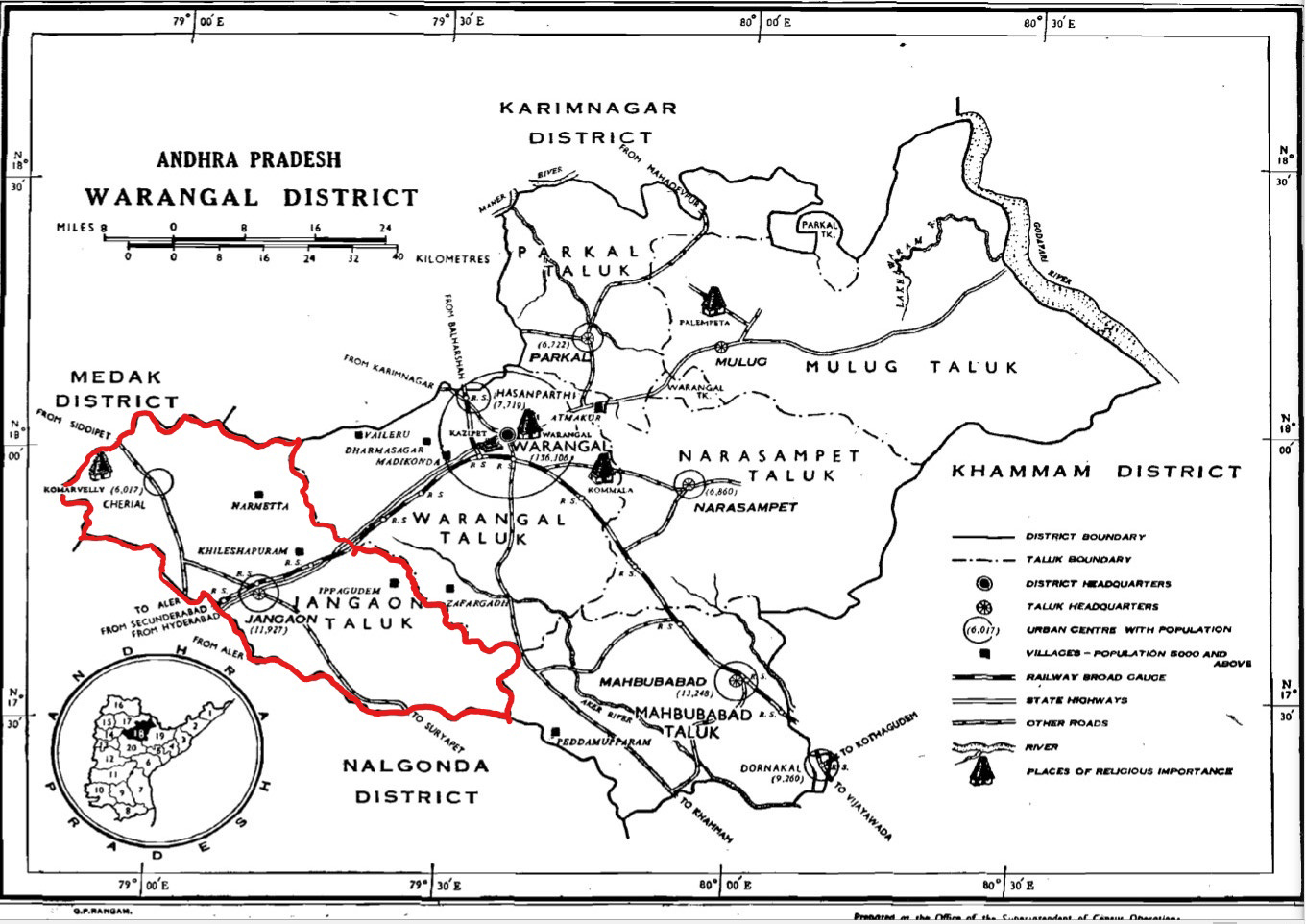
Jangaon Taluk 1961 in Warangal District (1953 to 2016)

In 1854 the Jangaon Taluka was under Bhonagheer Circars. Jangaon is mentioned as Zungaon in an 1854 map. In 1866 new districts were created; all Circars were delimited and merged. Bhonagheer, Davercondah and Nelgoondah Circars merged to form Nalgonda District but the Jangaon Taluka was transferred from Bhongir Circar to Warangal District in 1866, Cherial was renamed Taluka by adding some parts of Wardannapet region, with its headquarters at Jangaon.

1905 Jangaon Taluka was transferred to Nalgonda District from Warangal district. Hyderabad State was annexed to the Dominion of India by operation polo in 1948, and became an Indian state. In 1948 Jangaon taluka was part of Nalgonda district in Gulshanabad Division of Hyderabad State.

In 1953, there was a shuffling of areas, shifting some villages from one taluka to the other. Subsequently, when Warangal district was divided to facilitate administrative control and on 1 October 1953, Khammam district was formed. But again Jangaon taluka from Nalgonda district have become part of Warangal district. After these changes in 1953, few villages of Jangaon taluka went to Medak district and some remained in Nalgonda district. During the reign of Marri Chenna Reddy in 1979, Jangaon taluka was split into Cherial, Kodakandla and Jangaon talukas, at that time Jangaon taluk consist of 7 Circles namely Jangaon, Cherial, Rebarthi, Narmetta, Ippaguda, Chennur and Kodakondla Cirles. In 1985, when N. T. Rama Rao introduced the mandal system, Jangaon taluka was further divided in to Jangaon, Raghunathpalle, Lingalaghanpur Mandal and two villages merged in Station Ghanpur Mandal.

== Demographics ==
The 1951 Hydearabad State Census report shows Jangaon taluka was the most populated taluka of Nalgonda district with a total population of 2,91,165 with an area of 1,403.9 square kilometres (542.0 sq mi) with more than 200 inhabited towns and villages. Aler, Cheriyal, and Kolanpak were under Jangaon taluka before they were transferred to other districts.

As of 2011, the census of India, the Jangaon Mandal had a population of 92,446. The total population consists of 46,807 males and 45,639 females—a sex ratio of 975 females per 1,000 males. 9207 children are in the age group of 0–6 years, of which 4711 are boys and 4496 are girls—a ratio of 954 per 1,000. The average literacy rate was 72.91% with male literacy rate is 73.57% and the female literacy rate is 57.53% in Jangaon Mandal.

As per Census 2011 out of total population, 56.7% people lives in Urban areas while 43.3% lives in the Rural areas. The average literacy rate in urban areas is 82.4% while that in the rural areas is 60.5%. Also the Sex Ratio of Urban areas in Jangaon Mandal is 952 while that of Rural areas is 975.

== Towns and Villages ==
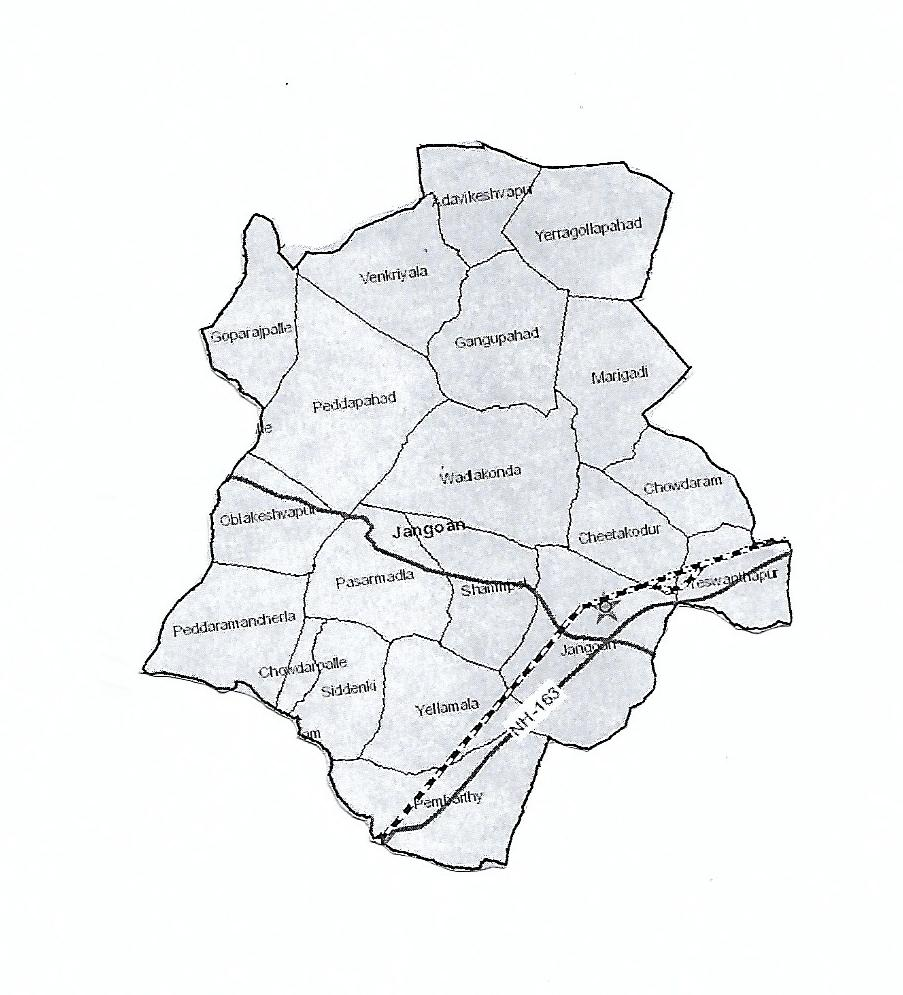
Jangaon Mandal

Jangaon Mandal now consist of Jangaon Municipality and 19 Panchayats Villages.

- Goparajpalle
- Peddapahad
- Venkriyala
- Adavikeshvapur
- Yerragollapahad
- Marigadi
- Gangupahad
- Wadlakonda
- Oblakeshvapur
- Peddaramancherla
- Chowdarpalle
- Siddenki
- Pasarmadla
- Yellamla
- Pembarthy
- Shamirpet
- Cheetakodur
- Chowdaram
- Yeswanthapur
