= Jangaon =

Jangaon Janagama
- Town
- Jangaon (Telangana)
- Coordinates: 17.722700°N 79.151800°E
- Country: India
- State: Telangana
- District: Jangaon district

Government
  - Type: Municipal council
  - Body: Jangaon Municipality
  - MLA: Palla Rajeshwar Reddy
  - Member of Parliament: Chamala Kiran Kumar Reddy
  - Municipal Chairman: Pokala Jamuna

Area
  - Total: 17.49 km^{2} (6.75 sq mi)
- Elevation: 403 m (1,322 ft)

Population (2011)
  - Total: 52,394
  - Rank: 37th in Telangana
  - Density: 2,996/km^{2} (7,759/sq mi)

Languages
  - Official: Telugu
- Time zone: UTC+5:30 (IST)
- PIN: 506 167
- Telephone code: 91–8716
- Vehicle registration: TG-27
- Website: jangaon.telangana.gov.in

Jangaon is a town and the district headquarters of Jangaon district in the Indian state of Telangana. It is also the mandal and divisional headquarters of Jangaon Mandal and Jangaon revenue division respectively. It is about 85 kilometres (53 miles) from the state capital Hyderabad. It lies on the National Highway 163.

== Geography ==
Jangaon is located on the eastern Deccan Plateau and has an average elevation of 382 metres (1,253 ft).

== Etymology ==
The name Jangaon evolved from "jain gaon", which means "village of Jains", a religion of India. Kolanpak (kulpak) in the Nalgonda district, which is about 20 kilometres (12 miles) from Jangaon, is a famous pilgrimage centre for Jain people and it has much historical background.

== History ==
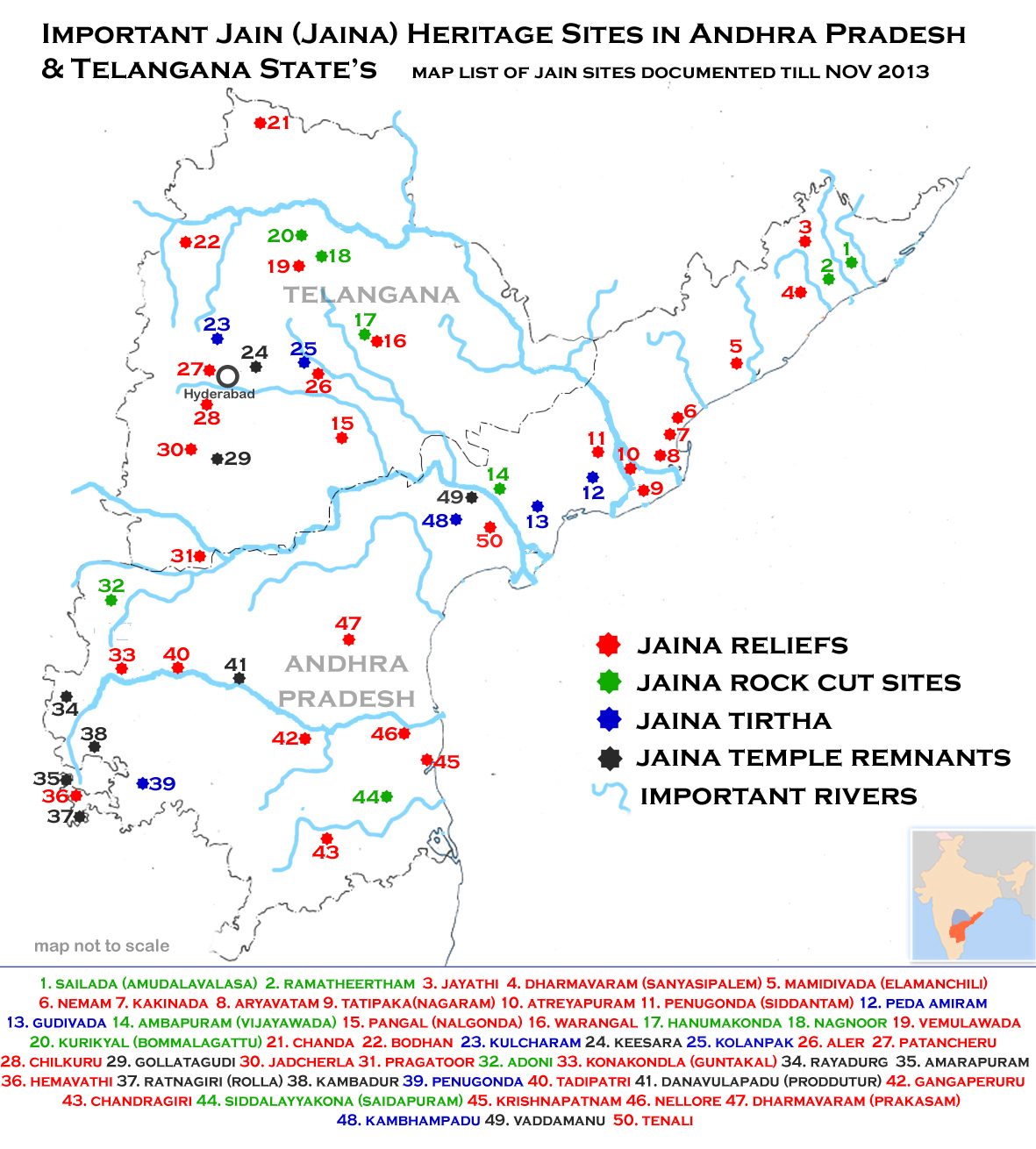
Jangaon is an important Jain Heritage site of Telangana state

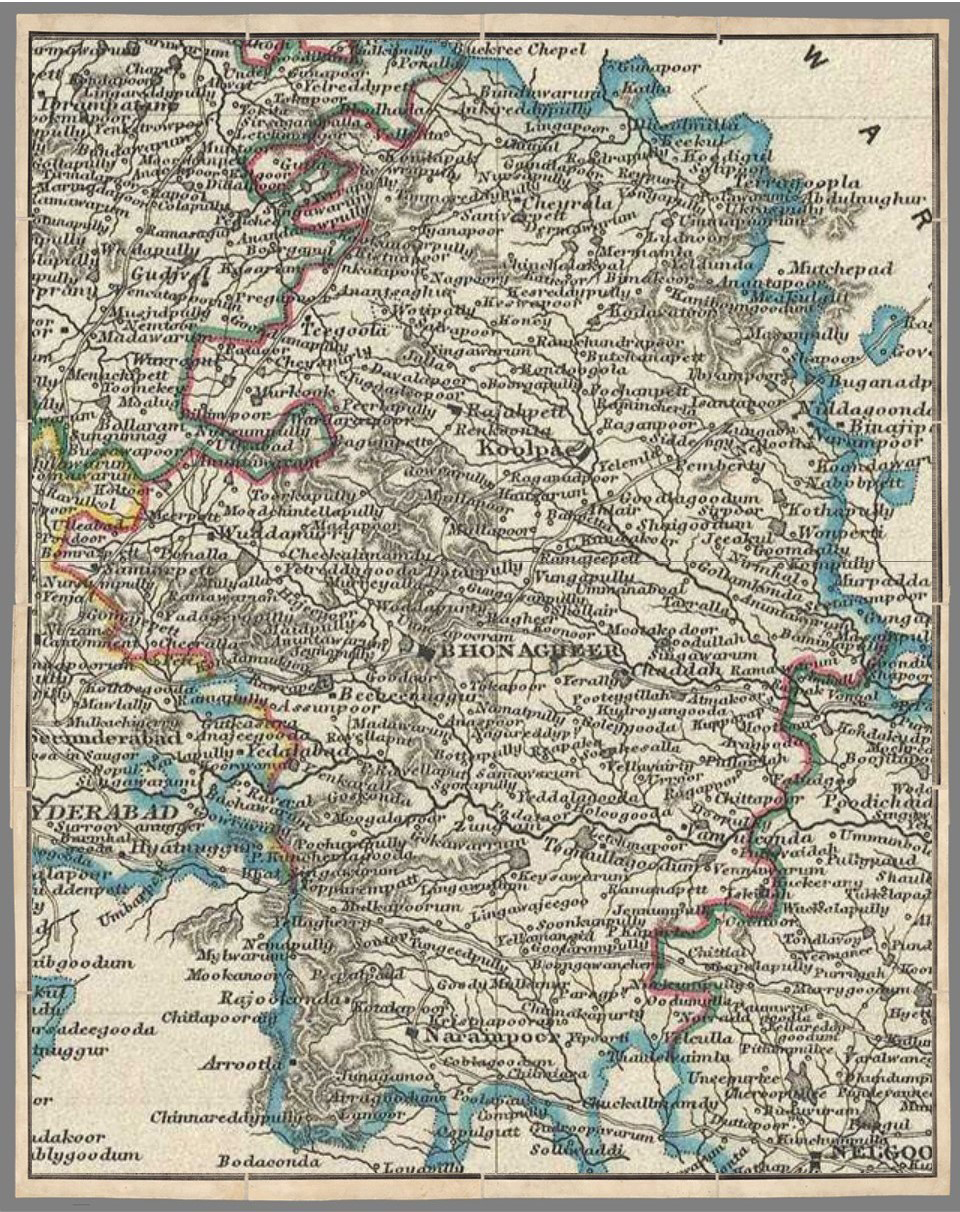
Jangaon in Bhongir District Circar 1854

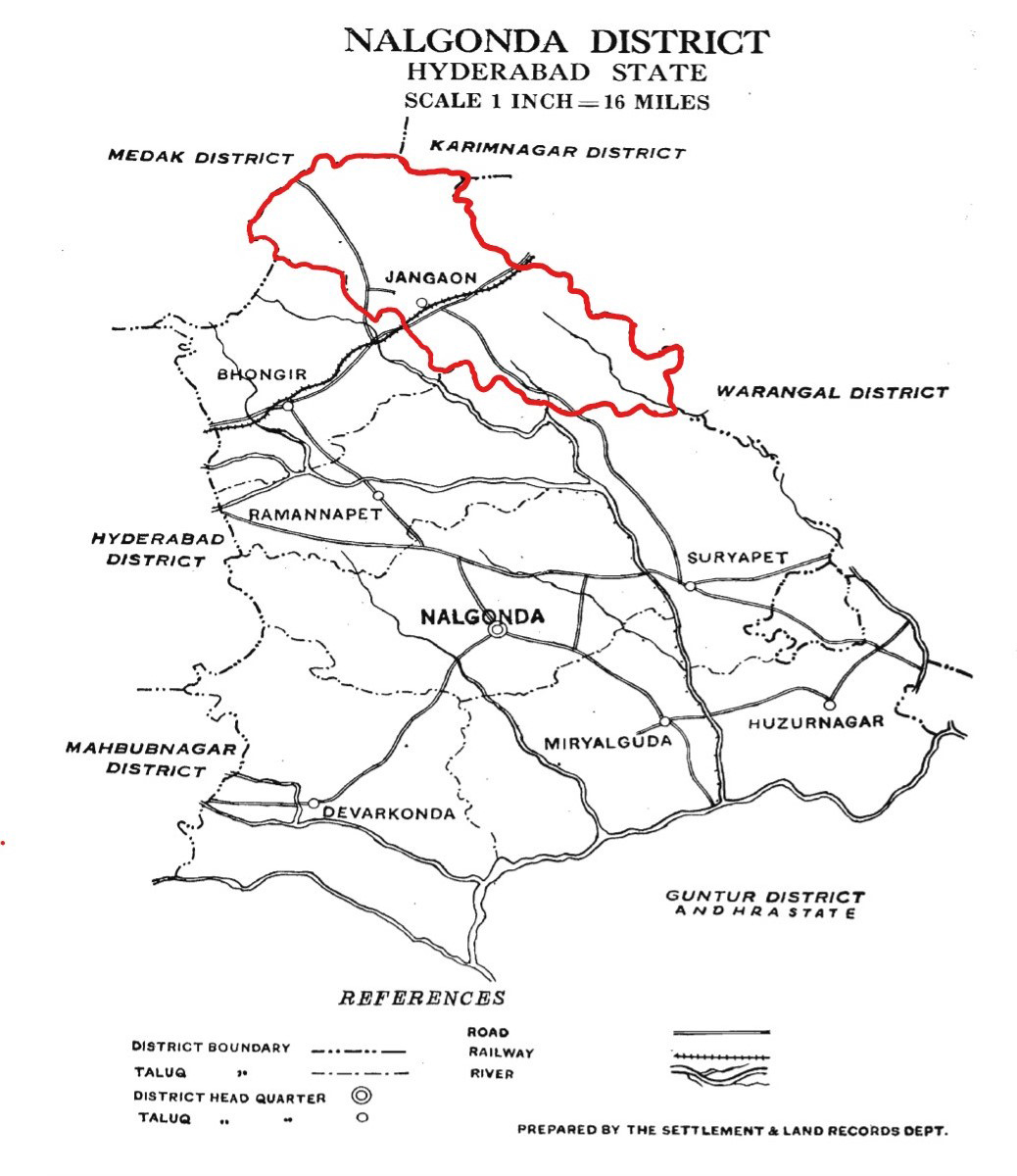
Jangaon Taluk 1951 in Nalgonda District

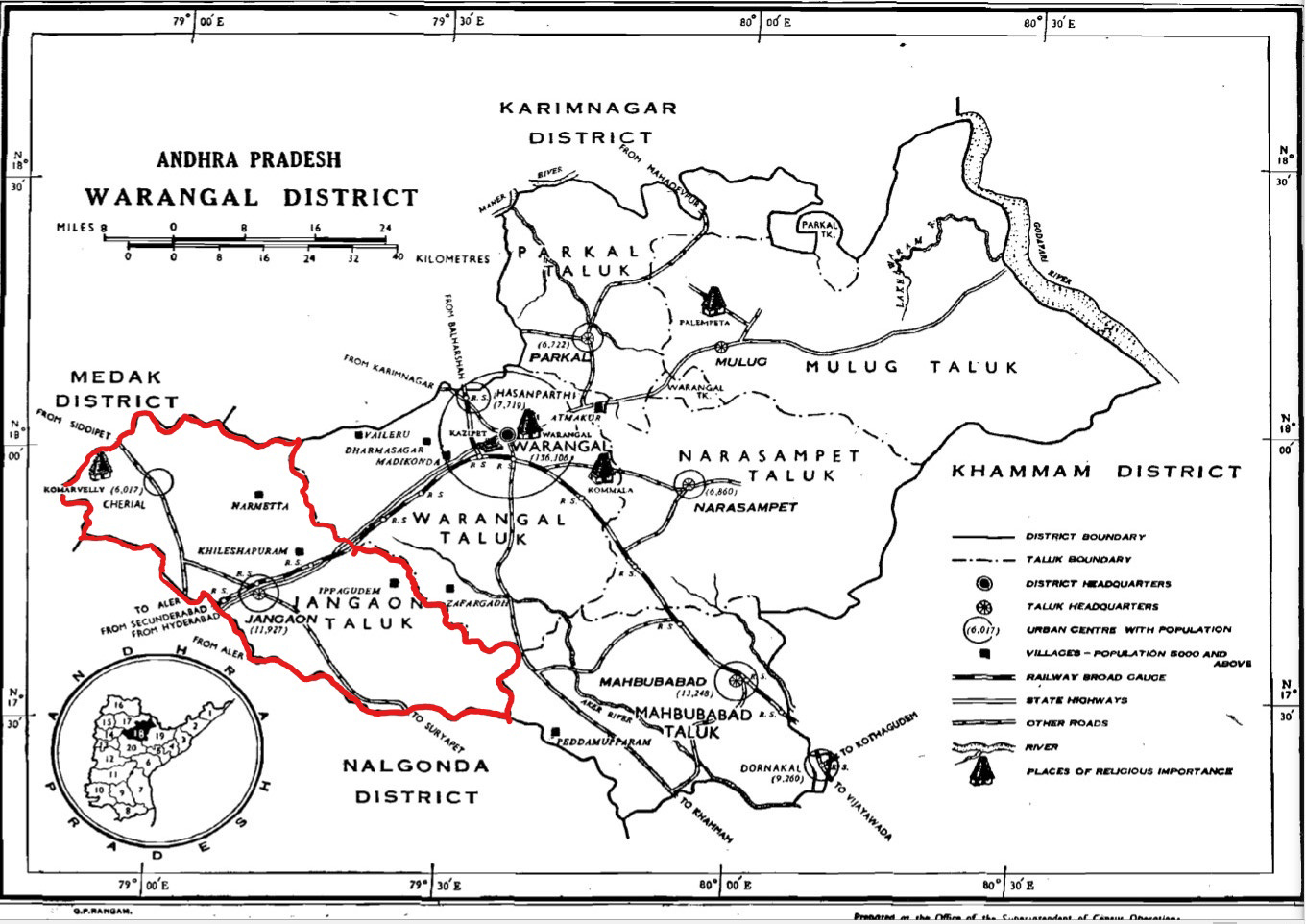
Jangaon Taluk 1961 in Warangal District

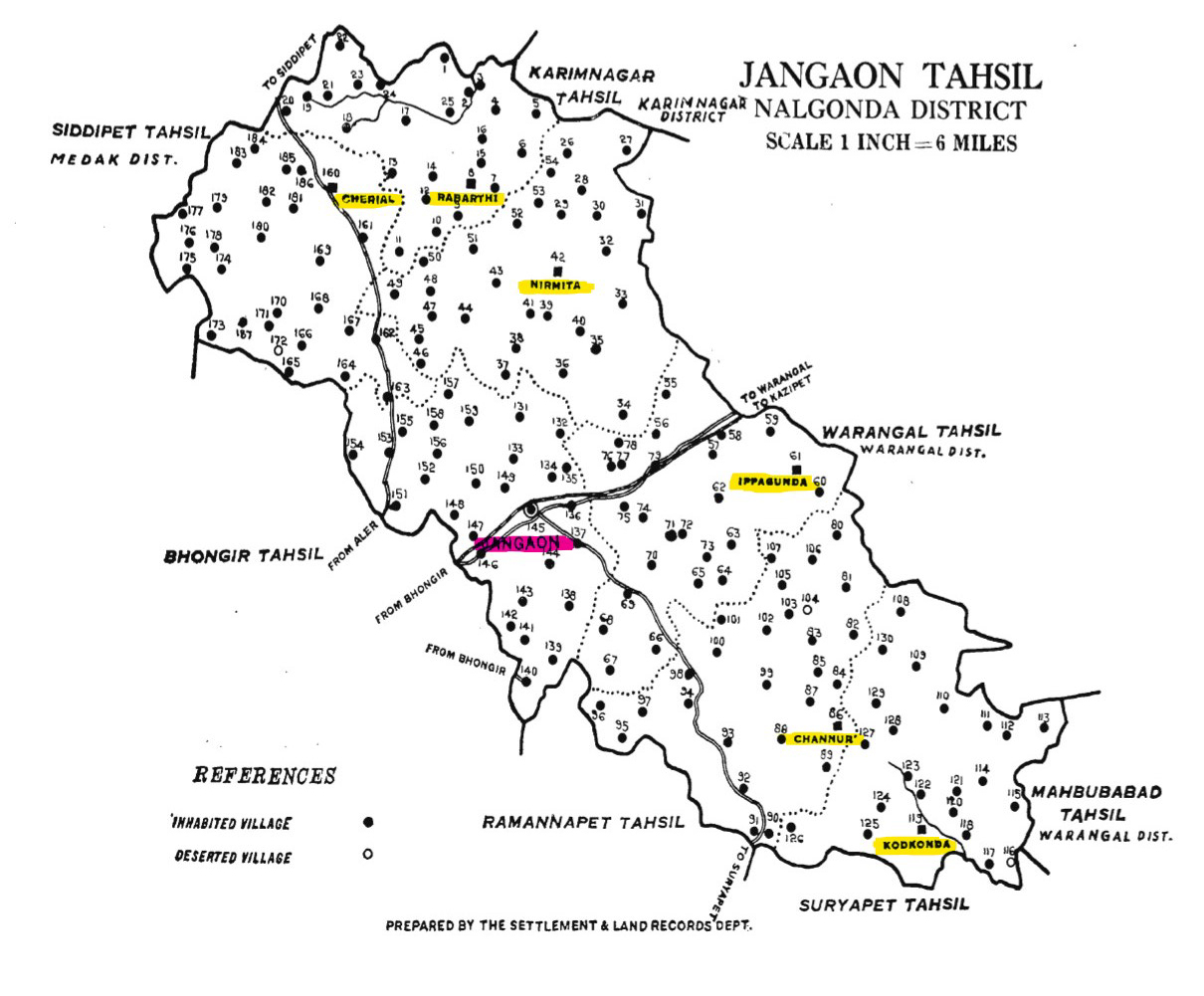
Jangaon Taluk with Circles 1951

Jain Thirthankara sculptures that were found in the excavations near the town revealed the existence of Jainism in the Megalithic age.

Jangaon was the second capital region of the Kalyani Chalukyas in the 11th century. One of the most acclaimed Telugu poets of all time Bammera Pothana was born in the village of Bammera in Jangoan in 1450 AD. After the demise of the Nayaks 50-years rule, this region came under the Kakatiya dynasty from 1195 to 1323, before being annexed to the Delhi Sultanate under Tughlaq rule. The region was part of the Bahmani Sultanate and then the Sultanate of Golconda Qutb Shahi dynasty in 1512. The Mughal emperor Aurangzeb conquered Golconda in 1687 and it remained part of the Mughal empire. Qamar-ud-din Khan Asaf Jah I declared sovereignty in 1724 and established the Asaf Jahi Dynasty.

In 1854 the Jangaon area was under the administrative region of Bhonagheer Circars. Jangaon is mentioned as Zungaon in an 1854 map. In 1866 new districts were created; all Circars were reorganised and merged. Bhonagheer, Davercondah and Nelgoondah Circars merged to form Nalgonda District but the Jangaon area was transferred from Bhongir Circar to Warangal District in 1866, Cherial was renamed Taluka by adding some parts of Wardannapet region, with its headquarters at Jangaon.

In 1905 the Princely state of Hyderabad was sub-divided into four divisions; Aurangabad Division, Gulbarga Division, Gulshanabad Division and Warangal Division. Districts were again reorganised in 1905; Jangaon (Cherial), Taluka and Kodar (Kodad). Taluka was transferred to Nalgonda District from Warangal district. Hyderabad State was annexed to the Dominion of India by operation polo in 1948, and became an Indian state. In 1948 Jangaon taluka was part of Nalgonda district in Gulshanabad Division of Hyderabad State.

In 1953, there was a shuffling of areas, shifting some villages from one taluka to the other. Subsequently, when Warangal district was divided to facilitate administrative control and on 1 October 1953, Khammam district was formed. Khammam, Yellandu, Madhira, Burugunpahad and Palavancha talukas have been made part of it. Warangal, Mulugu, Mahabubabad, Pakala (Narsampet) remained in Warangal district. But again Parkaala from Karimnagar district and Jangaon taluka from Nalgonda district have become part of Warangal district living back Nalgonda, Miryalguda, Deverkonda, Bhongir, Ramannapet, Suryapet, and Huzurnagar to Nalgonda district. After these changes in 1953, few villages of Jangaon taluka went to Medak district and some remained in Nalgonda district.

During the reign of Marri Chenna Reddy in 1979, Jangaon taluka was split into Cherial, Kodakandla and Jangaon talukas, at that time Jangaon taluk consist of 7 Circles namely Jangaon, Cherial, Rebarthi, Narmetta, Ippaguda, Chennur and Kodakondla Cirles. In 1985, when N. T. Rama Rao introduced the mandal system, Jangaon taluka was further divided in to Jangaon Mandal, Raghunathpalle, Lingalaghanpur and Devaruppula mandals.

On 11 October 2016 Jangaon was made the district headquarters, along with 21 newly formed districts in Telangana. Warangal district was divided into five district: Warangal Urban district (now Hanamkonda district), Warangal Rural district (now Warangal district), Jangaon district, Jayashankar district and Mahabubabad district. Jangaon district was formed mostly from the old Jangaon Revenue division, with the exception of Maddur, Cherial and Komuravelli mandals, which were transferred to newly formed Siddipet district, Ghanpur and Zaffergadh from Warangal Revenue division and Gundala of Nalgonda district were merged with Jangaon district.

== Demographics ==
Religions in Jangaon Town
Religion	Percent
Hindu	86.06%
Muslim	11.55%
Christians	1.83%
Others†	0.66%
†Includes Sikhs, Buddhist and 0.27% of population with no religion stated

Population By Mother Tongue in Jangaon Town
1. Telugu (86.0%)
2. Urdu (11.5%)
3. Hindi (1.60%)
4. Marathi (0.30%)
5. Punjabi (0.20%)
6. Others (0.40%)

Historical population
Year	Pop.	±%
1901	1,696	—
1911	3,537	+108.5%
1921	4,158	+17.6%
1931	8,078	+94.3%
1941	7,036	−12.9%
1951	11,259	+60.0%
1961	11,927	+5.9%
1971	16,866	+41.4%
1981	25,112	+48.9%
1991	34,305	+36.6%
2001	43,996	+28.2%
2011	52,394	+19.1%

The 1951 Hydearabad State Census report shows Jangaon taluka was the most populated taluka of Nalgonda district with a total population of 2,91,165 with an area of 1,403.9 square kilometres (542.0 sq mi) with more than 200 inhabited towns and villages. Aler, Cheriyal, and Kolanpak were under Jangaon taluka before they were transferred to other districts.

As of 2011, the census of India, the city had a population of 52,394 with 12,276 households. The total population consists of 26,764 males and 25,630 females—a sex ratio of 958 females per 1,000 males. 5,123 children are in the age group of 0–6 years, of which 7,347 are boys and 6,993 are girls—a ratio of 952 per 1,000. The average literacy rate was 82.39% with 38,948 literates.

=== Religion ===
86.08% of the population were Hindu and (11.55%) were Muslim. Other religious minorities included Christians (1.83%), Sikhs (0.23%), Buddhists (0.02%) and those of no stated religion (0.27%).

=== Language ===
Speaker based on Mother Tongue in Jangaon Town are 86% Telugu, 11.5 Urdu, 0.3 Marathi, 0.2 Punjabi, 0.4 other Languages.

== Climate ==
Jangaon experiences a tropical climate. According to the Geological survey, the area is drought-prone and experiences very hot summers, moderate winters and less than the average precipitation.

The climate in Jangaon is referred to as a local steppe climate. There is little annual rainfall; the climate here is classified as BSh by the Köppen-Geiger system. The average annual temperature is 27.3 °C (81.1 °F). The average annual rainfall is 788 millimetres (31.0 in).

The least amount of rainfall occurs in January; the average in this month is 1 millimetre (0.039 in). July is the wettest month with an average of 183 millimetres (7.2 in). The temperatures are highest on average in May at around 33.9 °C (93.0 °F). In December, the average temperature is 22.0 °C (71.6 °F); the lowest monthly average temperature of the year. The variation in precipitation between the driest and wettest months is 182 millimetres (7.2 in). The average temperatures vary during the year by 11.9 °C (53.4 °F).

Climate data for Jangaon Town
Month	Jan	Feb	Mar	Apr	May	Jun	Jul	Aug	Sep	Oct	Nov	Dec	Year
Mean daily maximum °C (°F)	29.7 (85.5)	32.4 (90.3)	36.0 (96.8)	38.4 (101.1)	40.4 (104.7)	35.9 (96.6)	31.1 (88.0)	30.8 (87.4)	31.0 (87.8)	31.4 (88.5)	29.6 (85.3)	28.8 (83.8)	33.0 (91.3)
Mean daily minimum °C (°F)	16.3 (61.3)	18.6 (65.5)	21.7 (71.1)	25.0 (77.0)	27.5 (81.5)	25.8 (78.4)	23.7 (74.7)	23.6 (74.5)	23.2 (73.8)	21.4 (70.5)	17.6 (63.7)	15.2 (59.4)	21.6 (71.0)
Average precipitation mm (inches)	1 (0.0)	2 (0.1)	5 (0.2)	21 (0.8)	17 (0.7)	119 (4.7)	183 (7.2)	167 (6.6)	168 (6.6)	78 (3.1)	21 (0.8)	8 (0.3)	790 (31.1)

== Governance ==
=== Civic administration ===
Jangaon Municipality is the civic body that oversees the civic needs of the town. It was constituted in 1953 as a third grade municipality. It was upgraded to second grade in the year 2010 with 28 municipal wards. The jurisdiction of the civic body is spread over 17.49 km^{2} (6.75 mi^{2}).

=== Law and order ===
The West Zone Deputy Commissioner of Police Warangal is responsible for maintaining law and order in the town and district areas. Jangaon has Senior Civil Judge's Court, and Prl. Junior Civil Judge's Court for maintaining law and order.

=== Healthcare ===
The 100-bed Government Area Hospital Jangaon is the largest hospital in the town. A new Medical college was sanctioned to the Jangaon District and will be upgrading the existing hospital in the district by the state government and admissions will be started from 2023.

== Culture ==
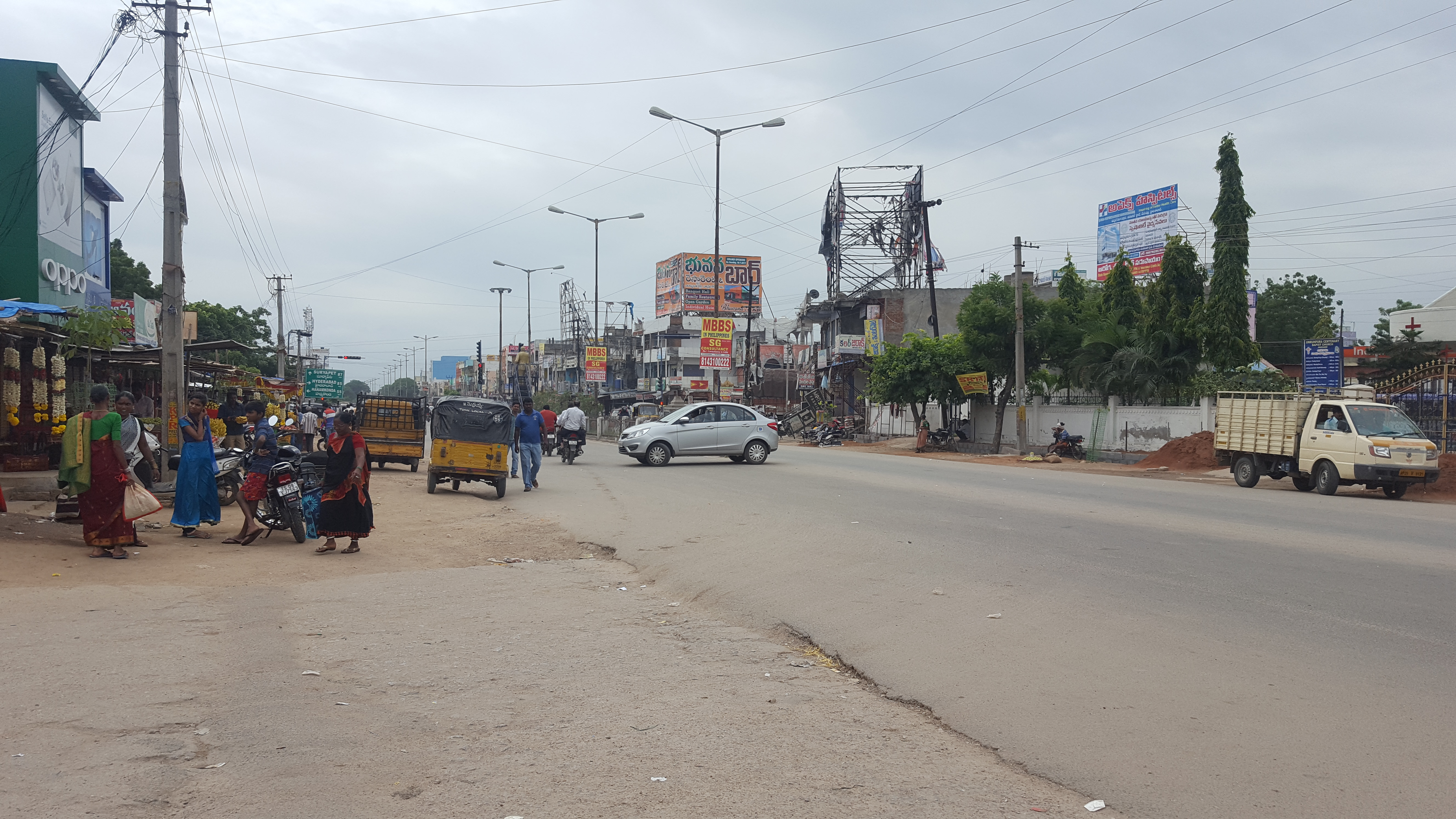
Street of Jangaon

Kolanupaka temple, a religious destination for the Jains.

The Champak Hills are located 6 km (3.7 mi) away from the town.

Jeedikalllu Sri Ramachandra Swamy Devasthanam is a temple that predates Bhadrachalam temple. Jeedikalllu village is located about 15 km southerly to the district centre, Jangaon.

== Nearest Cities ==
West (NH163)

- Hyderabad 85 km

South (NH365B)

- Suryapet 88 km

East (NH163)

- Warangal 60 km

North (NH365B)

- Siddipet 60 km

== Transport ==
=== Public transport ===
The TSRTC has a bus depot in the town and provides public transport.

=== Roadways ===
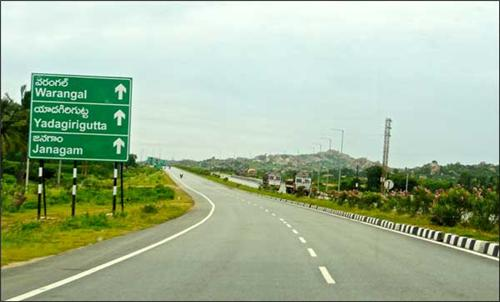
NH 163 showing Jangaon sign

Jangaon has road and rail connectivity. The town has a total road length of 124.75 km (77.52 mi), of which 73.50 km (45.67 mi) is cement or concrete roads, 15.25 km (9.48 mi) is bitumen roads and 36.00 km (22.37 mi) is water-bound macadam road. National Highway 163, connecting Hyderabad and Bhopalpatnam Road, passes through the town. A new national highway NH 365B connects Jangaon with different district headquarters of the state Suryapet-Jangaon-Siddipet-Siricilla.

=== Railway ===
Jangaon railway station provides rail connectivity to the town and is under the jurisdiction of the Secunderabad railway division of South Central Railway zone. It was constructed by Nizam's Guaranteed State Railway in 1879. This railway line connects Hyderabad with Warangal, and was later extended to Bezawada. Falaknuma–Jangaon MEMU is a suburban train that connects the town with the state capital.

== Education ==
The town has 38,948 literates; 21,722 males, 17,226 females and a literacy rate of 82.39%. The primary and secondary school education is run by government and private schools under the School Education Department of the state, assisted by State Institute of Educational Technology. The municipal limits of the town has a total of 14 government and 38 private schools.

The Higher Education Department of the state oversees the undergraduate and postgraduate education. The town has four government and fifteen private run colleges. This includes TSSW Boys Residential Junior College, a social welfare college; 5 private unaided colleges and a co-operative junior college. There exists one residential college under TSRJC, ten privately aided colleges, and two co-operative colleges. A.B.V.Government Degree College is an autonomous college that is affiliated with Kakatiya University and approved under the Universities Grant Commission scheme.

A government medical college was established in the town in 2023.
