= Jangaon Assembly constituency =

Constituency of the Telangana legislative assembly in India

Coordinates: 17.73°N 79.16°E

Jangaon
- Constituency No. 98 for the Telangana Legislative Assembly
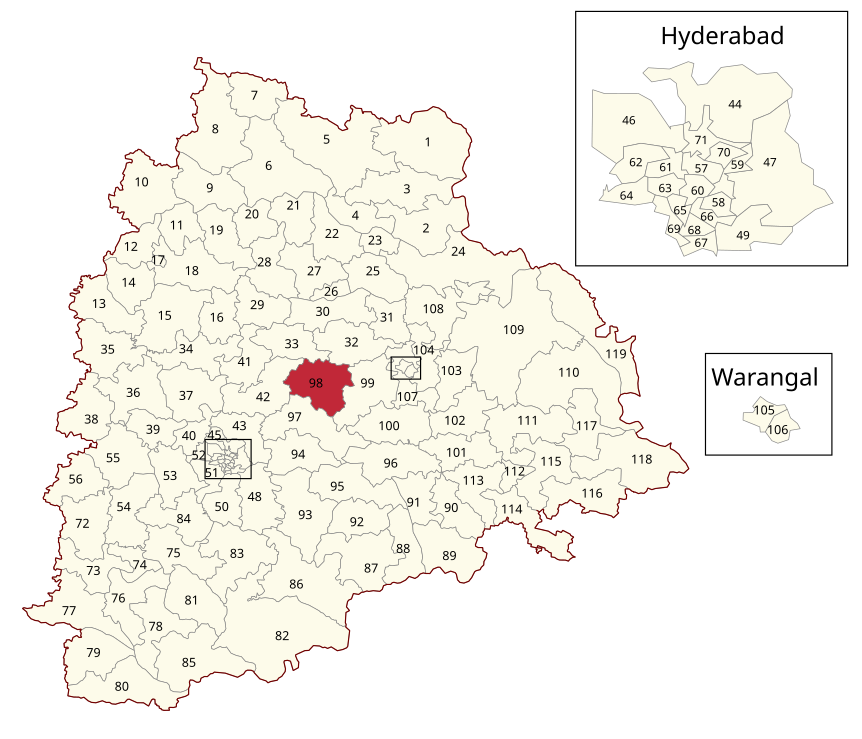
- Location of Jangaon Assembly constituency within Telangana

Constituency details
- Country: India
- Region: South India
- State: Telangana
- District: Jangaon
- Lok Sabha constituency: Bhongir
- Established: 1951
- Total electors: 2,07,028
- Reservation: None

Member of Legislative Assembly
- 3rd Telangana Legislative Assembly
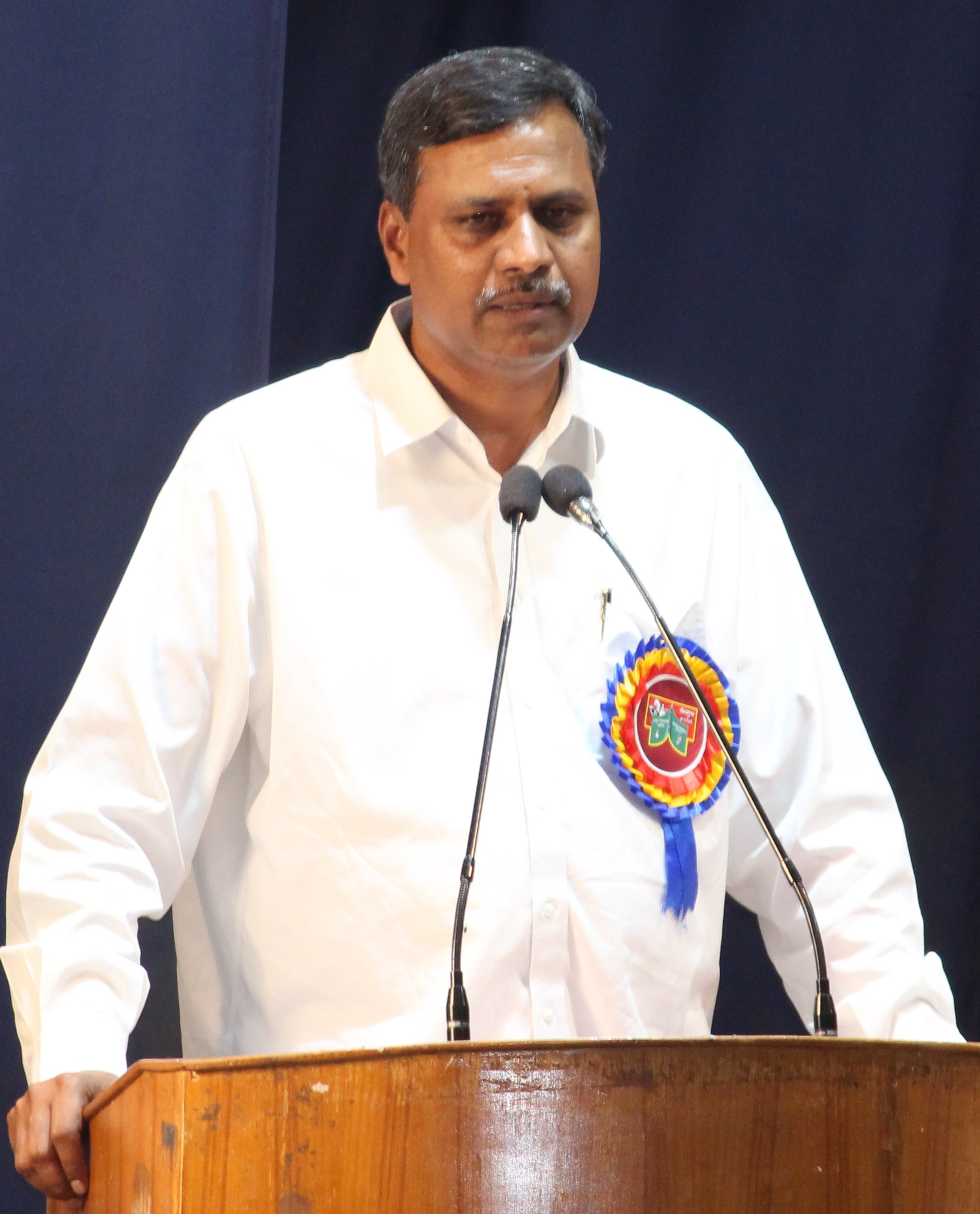
- Incumbent Palla Rajeshwar Reddy
- Party: Bharat Rashtra Samithi
- Elected year: 2023

Jangaon Assembly constituency is a constituency of Telangana Legislative Assembly, India. It is one of three constituencies in Jangaon district and 12 constituencies in undivided Warangal district. It is part of Bhongir Lok Sabha constituency.

Palla Rajeshwar Reddy of Bharat Rashtra Samithi is the current MLA of the constituency.

== Overview ==
No.98 is Jangaon Legislative Assembly constituency.

Jangaon Assembly Constituency was created in 1952, when it was one of the 175 total Assembly Constituencies of Hyderabad Legislative Assembly. Jangaon was under different Lok Sabha constituencies every time delimitation occurred.

S.No	Duration	Lok Sabha constituency
1	1952-1957	Nalgonda
2	1957-1967	Warangal
3	1967-1977	Siddipet
4	1977-2009	Hanamkonda
5	2009–Present	Bhuvanagiri

=== Delimitation History ===
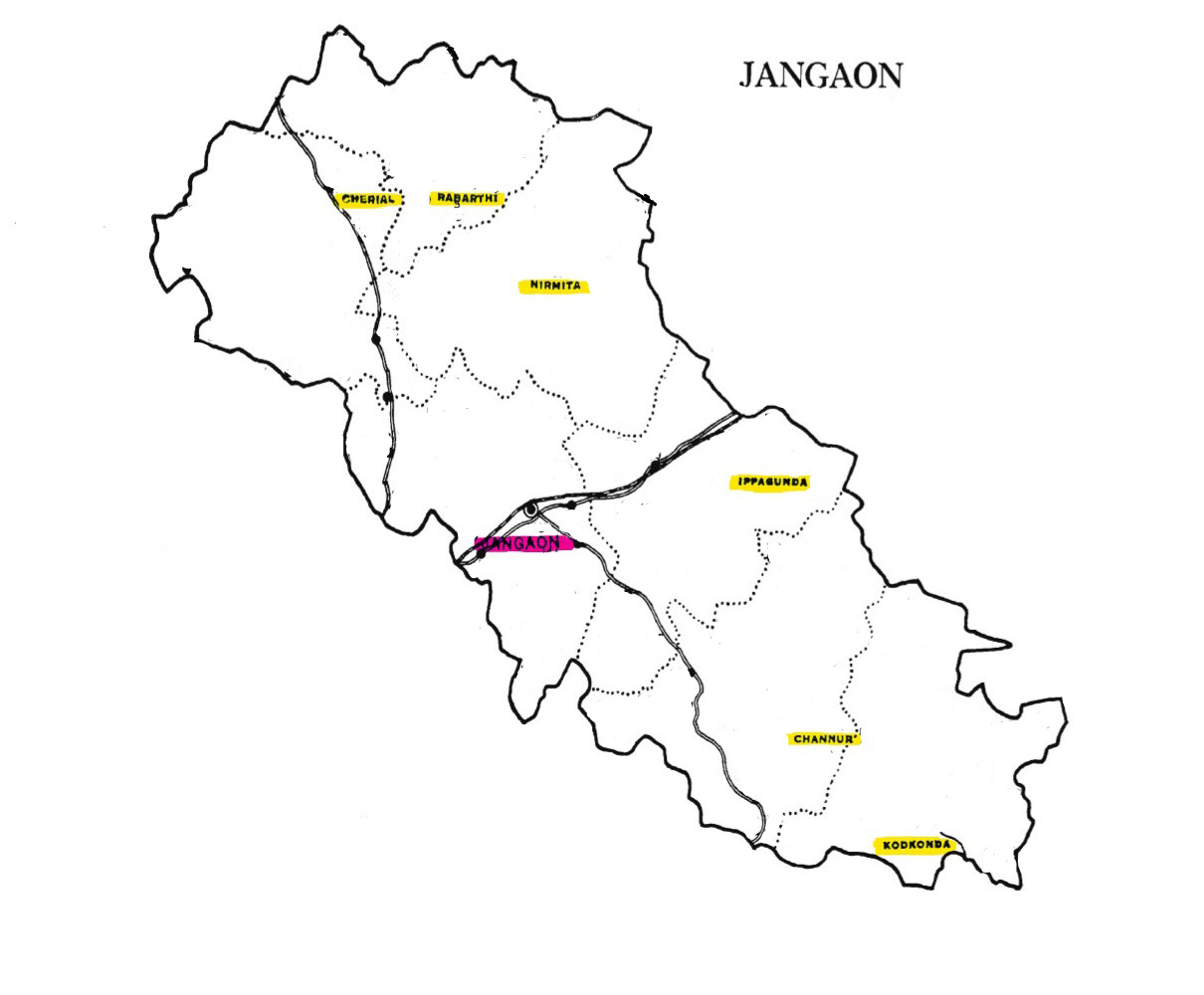
Jangaon Assembly constituency 1957

Following villages were included in Jangaon Assembly constituency during delimitation every time.

S.No	A.C.No	Year	Lok Sabha constituency	Mandal / Tehsil / Taluka in Jangaon Assembly constituency
1	133	1952	Nalgonda	Jangaon, Reberthy, Narmetta Circles of Jangaon Taluka.
2	64	1957	Warangal	Jangaon, Ippaguda, Reberthy, Narmetta, Cheriyal Circles of Jangaon Taluka.
3	272	1962	Warangal	Jangaon, Ippaguda, Narmetta (Part) Circles of Jangaon Taluka.
4	257	1967	Siddipet	Jangaon, Ippaguda, Narmetta (Part) Circles of Jangaon Taluka.
5	262	1977	Hanamkonda	Jangaon, Ippaguda, Chennur (Part) Circles of Jangaon Taluka.
6	98	2009	Bhuvanagiri	Jangaon, Narmetta, Cheriyal, Bachannapet, Maddur Mandals

=== Mandals ===
The Assembly Constituency presently comprises the following Mandals:

No	Mandal Name	District
1	Jangaon	Jangaon
2	Cherial	Siddipet
3	Narmetta	Jangaon
4	Bachannapet	Jangaon
5	Tharigoppula	Jangaon
6	Maddur	Siddipet
7	Komuravelli	Siddipet

- Tharigoppula created by splitting Narmetta Mandal
- Komuravelli created by splitting Cherial Mandal

== Members of the Legislative Assembly ==
=== Hyderabad ===
Assembly	Duration	MLA	Party
Hyderabad Legislative Assembly	1952-56	Syed Akhtar Hussain	People's Democratic Front

=== Andhra Pradesh ===
Assembly	Duration	MLA	Party
First AP Legislative Assembly	1956-57	Syed Akhtar Hussain	People's Democratic Front
Second AP Legislative Assembly	1957-62	Goka Ramalingam	Indian National Congress
Second AP Legislative Assembly	1957-62	G. Gopal Reddy	People's Democratic Front
Third AP Legislative Assembly	1962-67	Goka Ramalingam	Indian National Congress
Fourth AP Legislative Assembly	1967-72	M. K. Ahmed	Indian National Congress
Fifth AP Legislative Assembly	1972-78	Kasani Narayana	Indian National Congress
Sixth AP Legislative Assembly	1978-83	Kodur Vardha Reddy	Indian National Congress
Seventh AP Legislative Assembly	1983-85	Laxma Reddy Rondla	Telugu Desam Party
Eighth AP Legislative Assembly	1985-89	Asireddy Narsimha Reddy	Communist Party of India
Ninth AP Legislative Assembly	1989-94	Ponnala Lakshmaiah	Indian National Congress
Tenth AP Legislative Assembly	1994-99	Charagonda Raji Reddy	Communist Party of India
Eleventh AP Legislative Assembly	1999-04	Ponnala Lakshmaiah	Indian National Congress
Twelfth AP Legislative Assembly	2004-09	Ponnala Lakshmaiah	Indian National Congress
Thirteenth AP Legislative Assembly	2009-14	Ponnala Lakshmaiah	Indian National Congress

=== Telangana ===
Assembly	Year	MLA	Party
First Telangana Legislative Assembly	2014	Muthireddy Yadagiri Reddy	Telangana Rashtra Samithi
Second Telangana Legislative Assembly	2018	Muthireddy Yadagiri Reddy	Telangana Rashtra Samithi
Third Telangana Legislative Assembly	2023	Palla Rajeshwar Reddy	Bharat Rashtra Samithi

== Election results ==
=== Telangana Legislative Assembly election, 2023 ===
Telangana Assembly Elections, 2023: Jangaon (Assembly constituency)
Party	Candidate	Votes	%	±%
BRS	Palla Rajeshwar Reddy	98,975	48.61	
INC	Kommuri Pratap Reddy	83,192	40.86	
BJP	Arutla Deshmantha Reddy	7,734	3.80	
Alliance of Democratic Reforms Party	Kalluri Kranthi	3,044	1.50	
CPI(M)	Moku Kanaka Reddy	1,765	0.87	
Independent	Kottoju Srinivas	1,568	0.77	
NOTA	None of the Above	1,467	0.72	
Majority		15,783	7.75	
Turnout		2,03,600		
BRS hold		Swing		

=== Telangana Legislative Assembly election, 2018 ===
2018 Telangana Legislative Assembly election: Jangaon
Party	Candidate	Votes	%	±%
TRS	Muthireddy Yadagiri Reddy	91,592	50.47	+1.67
INC	Ponnala Lakshmaiah	62,024	34.18	+4.36
SFB	Laxman Bhima	10,031	5.53	
NOTA	None of the Above	2,616	1.44	
Majority		29,568		
Turnout		1,81,468	86.19	
TRS hold		Swing	1.67	

=== Telangana Legislative Assembly election, 2014 ===
Telangana Assembly Elections, 2014: Jangaon (Assembly constituency)
Party	Candidate	Votes	%	±%
TRS	Muthireddy Yadagiri Reddy	84,074	48.80	
INC	Ponnala Lakshmaiah	51,379	29.82	
BJP	Pratap Reddy Kommuri	21,113	12.25	
Majority		32,695		
Turnout		1,72,291	83.22	
TRS gain from INC		Swing		

== See also ==
- List of constituencies of Telangana Legislative Assembly
