= Goka Ramaswamy =

Indian politician (1933–2005)

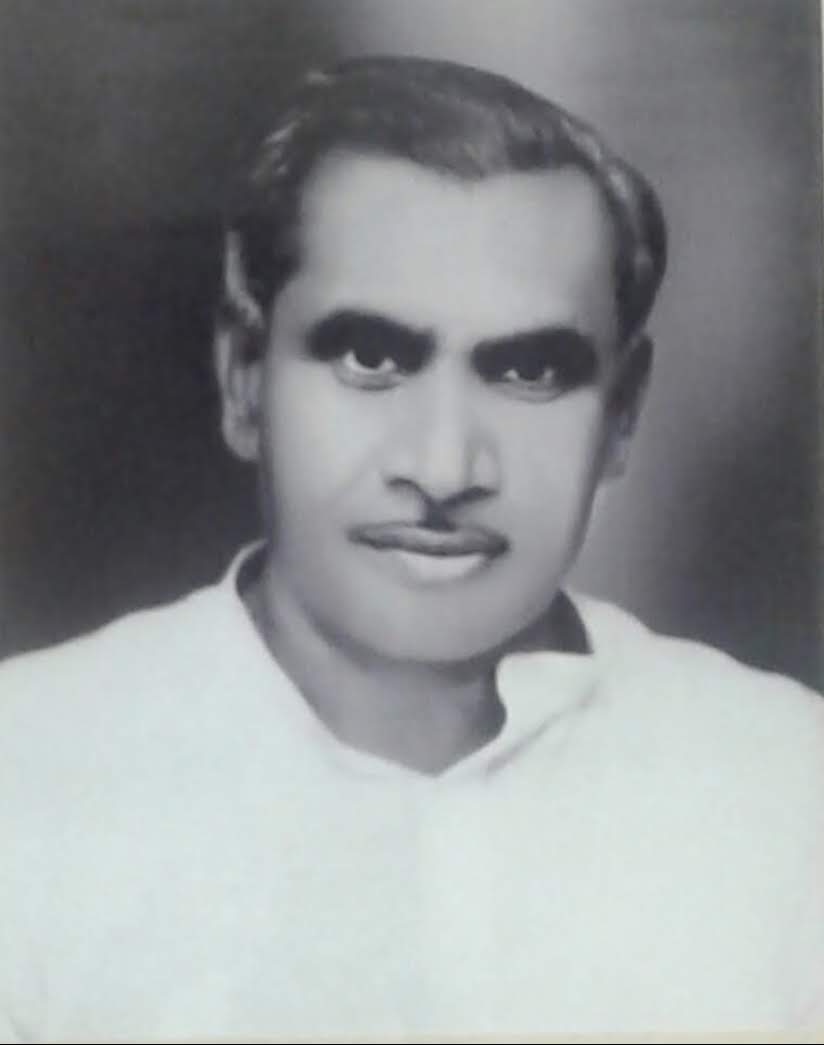

Member of Andhra Pradesh Legislative Assembly
- In office 1978–1985
- Preceded by: T. Hayagriva Chary
- Succeeded by: Bojappaly Rajaiah
- Constituency: Station Ghanpur

Minister for Food and Civil Supplies Government of Andhra Pradesh
- In office 1978–1980

Minister for Transport, Fisheries and Horticulture Development Government of Andhra Pradesh
- In office 1980–1982

Personal details
- Born: 1933 Jangaon, Hyderabad State, British India (now in Telangana, India)
- Died: 21 March 2005 Hyderabad
- Party: Indian National Congress
- Education: Osmania University

Goka Ramaswamy (1933 – 21 March 2005) was an Indian politician of the Indian National Congress from undivided Andhra Pradesh. Ramaswamy served as a Minister in the erstwhile state of Andhra Pradesh from 1978 to 1982 holding various portfolios. He was elected twice to Ghanpur (Station) Assembly constituency of the Andhra Pradesh Legislative Assembly in 1978 and 1983 consecutively as a Congress Party candidate. He was also the Deputy Leader of the Congress Legislature Party (CLP) between 1983 and 1985 in the Andhra Pradesh Legislative Assembly when N. T. Rama Rao's newly launched Telugu Desam Party (TDP) formed the government for the first time.

== Career ==
=== Early career ===
Goka Ramaswamy started his political career as a student leader while he was pursuing his Civil Engineering degree from Osmania University in the early 1950's. He was elected as Councilor in the Jangaon Municipality at the age of 24 in the year 1957 and went on to serve until 1967. He also served as ZP Vice Chairman of Warangal District in the late 1960's and early 1970's. He played an imported role in Congress (Indira) when Congress Party was divided into many factions and was a prominent member of Indira Gandhi's core group. He was also the General Secretary of All India Congress Committee(I) in 1977 and led the Congress Party (Indira) to victory in the 1978 Andhra Pradesh Legislative Assembly election.

=== Minister and Member of the Legislative Assembly(MLA) ===
Ramaswamy was first elected as an MLA from Ghanpur (Station) Assembly constituency in 1978 and was made Minister for Food and Civil Supplies in Marri Chenna Reddy's cabinet. Ramaswamy resigned from the Council of Ministers in 1979 due to differences with Chief Minister Marri Chenna Reddy, which created a political crisis in the state government due to which Chenna Reddy had to resign as Chief Minister of Andhra Pradesh and subsequently T. Anjaiah was made the Chief Minister. Ramaswamy served as Minister for Transport, Fisheries and Horticulture Development in T. Anjaiah's cabinet from 1980 to 1982. He was re-elected to Andhra Pradesh Legislative Assembly from Ghanpur(Station) in 1983 and was among the few leaders from congress to be elected during the NTR wave. He was made the Deputy Leader of Opposition from the Congress Legislature Party (CLP) in the Andhra Pradesh Legislative Assembly during N. T. Rama Rao's first tenure as the Chief Minister. Ramaswamy mentored many young leaders from Warangal District who went on to become Ministers later.

== Personal life ==
Ramaswamy's older brother Goka Ramalingam was an Indian Politician belonging to the Congress Party and a three-time Member of the Legislative Assembly (MLA) from 1952 to 1967 representing Bhongir constituency in the Hyderabad Legislative Assembly and Jangaon constituency in the Andhra Pradesh Legislative Assembly. Ramaswamy died at his residence in Hyderabad, in the early hours of 21 March 2005 at the age of 72.
