= Jangaon railway station =

Railway station in Telangana, India

Jangaon

General information
- Location: NH 163, Railway Station Road, Jangaon, Telangana; India
- Coordinates: 17.72°N 79.18°E
- Elevation: 382 metres (1,253 ft)
- System: Indian Railways and Hyderabad MMTS station
- Owner: Indian Railways
- Operator: South Central Railway
- Lines: Nagpur–Hyderabad line Secunderabad
- Platforms: 2
- Tracks: 4

Construction
- Structure type: Terminus
- Accessible: Yes

Other information
- Status: Active
- Station code: ZN
- Fare zone: South Central Railway zone

Services
Preceding station	Indian Railways	Following station
Pembarti towards ?	Bibinagar–Kazipet branch line	Yasantapuru towards ?
Location
- Location within Telangana Location within India

Jangaon railway station (station code: ZN) is a fifth grade non-suburban (NSG–3) category Indian railway station in Secunderabad railway division of South Central Railway zone. It is located in Jangaon of the Indian state of Telangana. It lies on the Nagpur–Hyderabad line of the zone. It was selected as one of the 21 stations to be developed under Amrit Bharat Stations scheme.

It was constructed by Nizam's State Railway in 1879. This railway line connects Hyderabad with Warangal, and was later extended to Bezawada. Falaknuma–Jangaon MEMU is a Hyderabad suburban train service starts from this station.

Jangaon railway platform

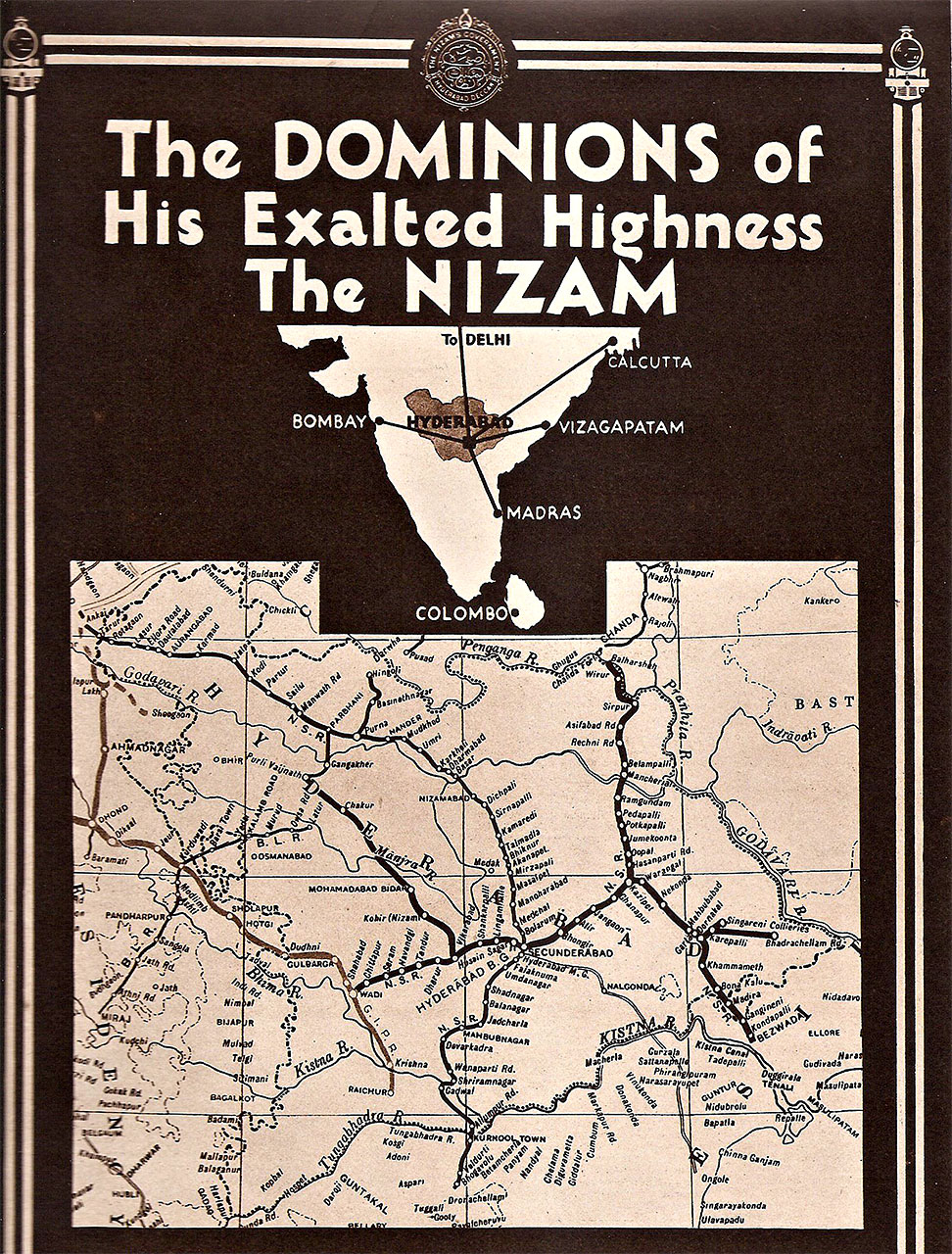
Nizam Railway Map

== See also ==
- List of railway stations in India
