= Muthireddy Yadagiri Reddy =

Indian politician

Muthireddy Yadagiri Reddy (born 12 February 1955) is an Indian politician from Telangana state. He is a former two time member of the Telangana Legislative Assembly from Jangaon Assembly constituency in Warangal district, representing the Telangana Rashtra Samithi.

== Early life ==
Reddy was born on 12 February 1955 in Punnole village, Wardhannapet mandal. Warangal district, Telangana to Gopal Reddy and Kousalya Devi. He completed his intermediate at the Government Junior College, Hanamkonda in 1972. He runs his own business and declared assets worth Rs.42 crore in his affidavit to the Election Commission of India.

== Career ==
Reddy won the Jangaon Assembly constituency representing the Telangana Rashtra Samithi in the 2014 Andhra Pradesh Legislative Assembly election, which was held concurrently for both the Andhra Pradesh and Telangana legislatures after the bifurcation of the state. He polled 84,074 votes and defeated his nearest rival, Ponnala Lakshmaiah of the Indian National Congress, by a margin of 32,695 votes. He retained the seat for TRS in the 2018 Telangana Legislative Assembly election. In 2018, he polled 91,592 votes and defeated Ponnala Lakshmaiah of the Indian National Congress by a margin of 29,568 votes.

In October 2023, he was appointed as the chairman of the Road Transport Corporation.
