= Thimmapur, Jangaon district =

Thimmapur
- Location in Telangana, India Thimmapur (India)
- Coordinates: 17.76856°N 79.48586°E
- Country: India
- State: Telangana
- Region: Telangana
- District: Jangaon district
- Talukas: Zaffergadh

Area
  - Total: 5.05 km^{2} (1.95 sq mi)

Population (2011)
  - Total: 945
  - Density: 187/km^{2} (485/sq mi)

Languages
  - Official: Telugu, Urdu
- Time zone: UTC+5:30 (IST)
- PIN: 506316
- Telephone code: 08711
- Vehicle registration: TS-03
- Website: telangana.gov.in

Thimmapur is a village in Jangaon district of the Indian state of Telangana. It is located in Zaffergadh mandal.
