= Kolkonda =

Village in Telangana, India

Kolkonda is a village in Devaruppula Mandal in Jangaon district, Telangana, India. It is located 51 kilometres (32 mi) South of District headquarters Warangal, and 15 kilometres (9.3 mi) from Devaruppula.

Kolkonda Pin code is 506303 and postal head office is Waddicherla Nawabpet .

== Villages and cities near kolkonda ==
Cheeturu (4 kilometres (2.5 mi)), Chowdur (3 kilometres (1.9 mi)), Thorrur (5 kilometres (3.1 mi)), Kothulabad (5 kilometres (3.1 mi)), Gabbeta (6 kilometres (3.7 mi)) are the nearby Villages to Kolkonda. Kolkonda is surrounded by Devaruppula Mandal towards South, Raghunathpalle Mandal towards North, Lingalaghanpur Mandal towards west, Gundala Mandal towards South .

Jangaon, Warangal, Bhongir, Suryapet are the nearby Cities to Kolkonda.

This Place is in the border of the Warangal District and Nalgonda District. Nalgonda District Gundala is South towards this place .

== Demographics of Kolkonda ==
Telugu is the local language here. Total population of Kolkonda is 2,960, of which 1,473 are males and 1,487 females, living in 641 Houses. The total area of Kolkonda is 1,193 hectares (2,950 acres).

== Colleges near Kolkonda ==
S R Jr College Devaruppala, Kadavendi Government College, Devaruppula; Kamareddy Guddem; Schools in Kolkonda; Kolkonda, Devaruppula, Warangal, Andhra Pradesh. PIN- 506303, Post - Waddicherla Nawabpet.
