= Maddelagudem =

Coordinates: 17°58′N 79°17′E

Maddelagudem Village is a village in Jangaon district (part of Telangana Plateau) of Telangana state, India.
