= Goka Ramalingam =

Indian politician

Member of the Andhra Pradesh Legislative Assembly
- In office 1957–1967
- Preceded by: Syed Akhtar Hussain
- Succeeded by: M. K. Ahmed
- Constituency: Jangaon
- In office 1956–1957
- Preceded by: Himself
- Succeeded by: Ravi Narayan Reddy
- Constituency: Bhongir

Member of the Hyderabad Legislative Assembly
- In office 1952–1957
- Preceded by: Ravi Narayan Reddy
- Succeeded by: Himself
- Constituency: Bhongir

Personal details
- Born: 21 October 1921 Jangaon, Hyderabad State, British India (now in Telangana, India)
- Died: 27 November 1999 (aged 78)
- Party: Indian National Congress
- Spouse: Goka Kumaramma

Goka Ramalingam (21 October 1921 – 1999) was an Indian politician who served in the Hyderabad Legislative Assembly and the successive Andhra Pradesh Legislative Assembly from 1952 until 1967. A member of the Indian National Congress, Ramalingam represented the Bhongir and Jangaon constituencies.

== Political career ==
In 1952, Ramalingam successfully ran as an Indian National Congress candidate for a by-election to the Hyderabad Legislative Assembly, defeating Govinddas Shroff of the People's Democratic Front by less than 300 votes in the Bhongir constituency. Ramalingam succeeded Ravi Narayana Reddy of the PDF, who had been elected to the 1st Lok Sabha in the 1952 Indian general election. Following the reorganization of Hyderabad State into Andhra Pradesh in 1956, Ramalingam continued to represent the Bhongir constituency in the Andhra Pradesh Legislative Assembly, the successor to the Hyderabad Legislative Assembly. In the 1957 Andhra Pradesh Legislative Assembly election, Ramalingam was re-elected in the neighboring Jangaon constituency. He was re-elected again in the 1962 election.

Ramalingam's younger brother Goka Ramaswamy was also an MLA, representing the Ghanpur Station constituency in the Andhra Pradesh Legislative Assembly, and serving as a cabinet minister from 1978 to 1982.
