= Zaffergadh =

Zaffergadh జాఫర్ గఢ్
- Town
- Location in Telangana, India
- Coordinates: 17.76856°N 79.48586°E
- Country: India
- State: Telangana
- Region: Telangana
- District: Jangaon district
- Talukas: Zaffergadh

Population (2013)
  - Total: 45,096

Languages
  - Official: Telugu, Urdu
- Time zone: UTC+5:30 (IST)
- PIN: 506316
- Telephone code: 08711
- Vehicle registration: TS 27

Zaffergadh is a village and a mandal in Jangaon district of Telangana state in India. Zaffergadh got its name from a Muslim ruler Zaffarudhaula who made this place capital of his dynasty. Zaffergadh Mandal (Headquarters) is 16 km from Ghanpur (Station) and well connected with roads. Zaffergadh is about 130 km from Hyderabad. From Hyderabad you can take National Highway - 202 connecting Hyderabad with Warangal City, get off this highway at Ghanapur (Station) and continue taking road to Zaffergadh.

== Features ==
The original name of Zaffargadh was Velpugonda. According to a Rashtrakuta inscription carved on the rock wall of the tank of the Lakshminarasimha Swamy hillock (Peddagutta) here, Sankaraganda of Rashtrakuta line of chiefs is believed to have constructed the tank on the hillock. On the back side of the hillock a Trikuta Temple, Garuda pillar and a Vishnu temple of Kakatiya period and a mosque are located. This area was occupied by Muslim rulers in the medieval times after the fall of Kakatiyas of Warangal in 1323 CE. Zaffruddoula, a Subedar of Golconda Nawabs (1760 AD) was the ruler of this area. With the aim of becoming an independent ruler of this area he had constructed an impregnable fort. Before his designs could be fructified, the Nawabs of the Golconda reportedly came to know about his plans and put him to death.

The village of Zaffargadh is situated in the valley between the hills on eastern and western sides. The hills are known as Chinnagutta and Peddagutta. There is a self manifested Lakshminarasimha Swamy Temple on Peddagutta. The village and the hills are surrounded by a rampart, 5 km in circumference. Around the rampart there is a deep moat. Three darwazas (inlets) were constructed to regularize the incoming and outgoing traffic. The darwazas are namely the Khammam darwaza Patnam darwaza and Hanamkonda darwaza. The doors of the darwazas are 10 feet wide and 20 feet in height. The bastions and gates are mounted with huge iron cannons.

Narasimha Swamy Temple on a Hill . This temple has a sacred story associated with it. According to a legend there was a pandit in this town of Zaffargadh who in his dream saw Narashimha Swamy who telling him that Lord manifested himself on this hill. Pandit was given the detailed position of manifestation by Narshimha Swamy himself and was asked to spread this to people to this town. Pandit then followed his dream and went to the location on this hill where he located Narashimha Swamy's idol at the location of manifestation. After this, people in this town constructed a temple where they found Sawmy's idol. There is a water sources on this hill where exactly at noon Narashimha Sawmy takes dip in the water and does Surya namaskara by standing at the same place every day. You can see Swamy's footprints at this location. You can actually hear the sound of Swamy taking the dip at noon every day and thereafter you can notice that these foot prints are wet. There is no proper steps/way to get to this temple and that is one of the reason why it did not become popular and not lot of people know about this temple outside of people around this area. You have to literally climb through this hill to get to this temple. No one is supposed to be staying on the hill after dark.

Ruins of Ancient forts ruled by Muslim rulers (Zaffarudhaula). These ruins can be seen on all the hills surrounding Zaffargadh.

== Demographics of Zaffergadh Mandal ==
Telugu is the Local Language here. Also People Speaks Urdu. Total population of Zaffergadh Mandal is 45,096 living in 10,470 Houses, Spread across total 43 villages and 19 panchayats. Males are 22,798 and Females are 22,298.

== Villages ==
The following is the list of villages in Zaffergadh mandal.

- Aliyabad
- Garmillapalle
- Himmathnagar [Guvvala Gudem]
- Konaichelam
- Kunoor
- Maqutham thanda
- Obulapur
- Raghunathpalle
- Sagaram
- Shapalle
- Suraram
- Thamadapalle (I)
- Thammadapalle (G)
- Theegaram
- Thidugu
- Thimmampet
- Thimmapur
- Uppugal
- Venkatapuram

=== Schools ===
- Z.P.High School Thidugu.
- Model School & Jr. College, Zaffergadh
- Z.P.High School Uppugal
- Z.P.High School Venkatapur
- Z.P.High School Village. Kunoor
- Z.P.High School Ch.R.R.M.Z.P.S.School Thimmampet
- Z.P.High School Zaffargadh
- Z.P.High School Himmathnagar, Thimmapur
- Z.P.High School Thammadapally (G)
- Mission High School Sagaram
- APSWRIES(Girls)(Velugu Zaffegadh)
- Chaithnya Public School Zaffergadh
- Avanthi Degree College Zaffergadh
- Thaksha shila junior College
- Maa Illu Prajadharana Ashramam
- New sunshine school Zaffargadh

=== Nearby cities ===
- Warangal- 39 km
- Hanmakonda- 40 km
- Jangaon- 44 km
- Bhongir- 82 km
- Suryapet- 108 km
- Hyderabad 130 km

Nearby Railway Stations

- Ghanpur- 16 km.
- Pindlai- 19 km.
- Kazipet Jn- 35 km.
- Raghunathpalli- 34 km

Nearby Airports

- Rajiv Gandhi International Airport- 141 km
- Vijayawada Airport- 220 km
- Rajahmundry Airport- 290 km
- Nanded Airport- 310 km

Nearby Tourist Places

- Warangal- 39 km
- Khammam- 120 km
- Medaram- 125 km
- Hyderabad- 127 km
- Nagarjunakonda- 180 km

Nearby Districts

- Warangal- 39 km
- Karimnagar- 140 km
- Nalgonda- 154 km
- Khammam- 150 km

Nearby Taluks

- Zaffergadh- 0 km
- Wardhannapet- 11 km
- Palakurthi- 15 km
- Ghanpur(Station)- 16 km

== Climate ==
Located in the semi-arid Telangana region of Andhra Pradesh, Zaffergadh has a predominantly hot and dry climate. Summers start in March, and peak in May with average high temperatures in the 42 °C (108 °F) range. The monsoon arrives in June and lasts until September with about 550 mm (22 in) of precipitation. A dry, mild winter starts in late November and lasts until early February, when there islittle humidity and average temperatures in the 22–23 °C (72–73 °F) range.
