= Bachannapet =

- village
- Country: India
- State: Telangana
- District: Jangaon
- Talukas: Bachannapet

Population
  - Total: 43,608

Languages
  - Official: Telugu
- Time zone: UTC+5:30 (IST)
- PIN: 506221
- Vehicle registration: TG 03

Bachannapet is a village and a mandal in Jangaon district in the Indian state of Telangana.

== Geography ==
Bachannapet is a Mandal (a subdistrict or administrative subdivision). The mandal includes 23 villages, (including Bachannapet), making it one of the largest of the 13 Mandals in the district. Jangoan District is administered under the Jangoan constituency, and a part of the Telangana government.

== Education ==
The village hosts a high school (established in 1955). Also present are a junior college, a public library and private schools.

== Facilities ==
A mosque, a bus stand, a petrol bunk, a police station, Mandal offices, Central Bank of India, Kakathiya Grameena Bank (SBI) are there.

== Culture ==
Among several historic temples is the Lord Shiva Temple, located at Kodavatoor village which is 8 km from the Mandal headquarters.

== Economy ==
Agriculture and textile production provide the principal sources of employment. Rice mills are nearby. Two water reservoirs (Gudi Cheruvu & Thalla Cheruvu) are available for domestic and commercial use.

The mandal is connected by road with Janagaon and Siddipet via National Highway 365B. The nearest railway station is in Janagaon village, some 17 km away.

== Health care ==
A government hospital is there.
