= Ponnala Lakshmaiah =

Indian politician

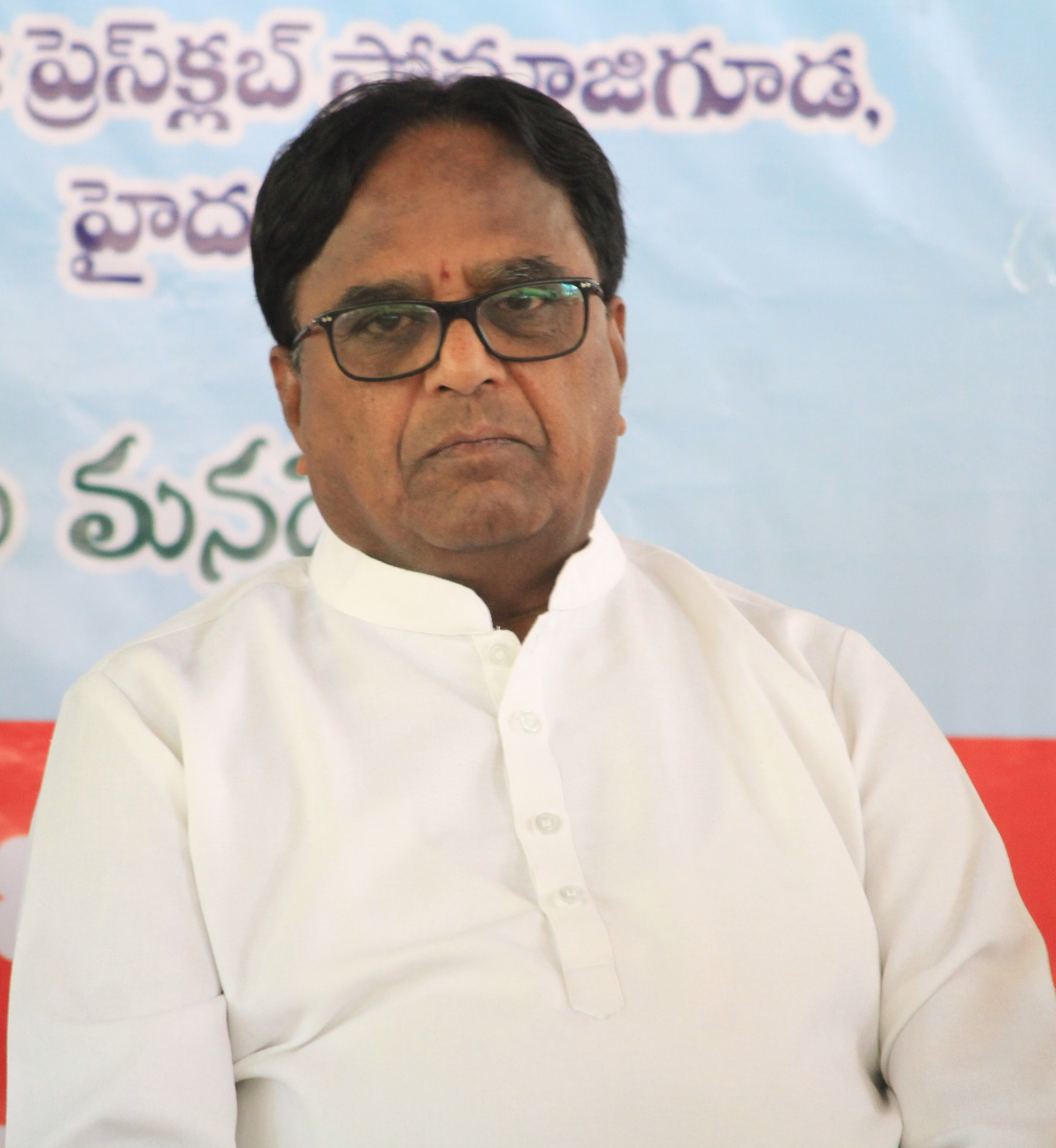

1st President of the Telangana Pradesh Congress Committee
- In office 11 March 2014 – 2 March 2015
- AICC President: Sonia Gandhi
- Preceded by: Office Established
- Succeeded by: N. Uttam Kumar Reddy

Minister of Major Irrigation, IT & Communications Government of Andhra Pradesh
- In office 2009–2014
- Governor: N. D. Tiwari; E. S. L. Narasimhan
- Chief Minister: Konijeti Rosaiah; N. Kiran Kumar Reddy
- Succeeded by: Devineni Uma Maheswara Rao; Palle Raghunatha Reddy

Member of Legislative Assembly Andhra Pradesh
- In office 1999–2014
- Preceded by: Charagonda Raji Reddy
- Succeeded by: Telangana Assembly Created
- Constituency: Jangaon
- In office 1985–1989
- Preceded by: Asireddy Narsimha Reddy
- Succeeded by: Charagonda Raji Reddy
- Constituency: Jangaon

Personal details
- Born: Ponnala Lakshmaiah; 15 February 1944 (age 82) Quilashahpur, Hyderabad State, British India (now Telangana, India)
- Party: Bharat Rashtra Samithi (2023 - present)
- Other political affiliations: Indian National Congress (1980 - 2023)
- Spouse: Ponnala Arunadevi

Ponnala Lakshmaiah (born 15 February 1944) is an Indian politician. He is a member of Bharat Rashtra Samithi (BRS). He is a former minister for Information Technology and Communications for the state of Andhra Pradesh, India. He was also a member of the legislative assembly of Andhra Pradesh, and a member of the All India Congress Committee.

== Early life ==
Ponnala Lakshmaiah was born in the village of Quilashahpur, located in the heart of the Telangana region, into the Telugu-speaking Hindu family of Ponnala Radha (Radhamma) and Ponnala Rama Kishtaiah. He Belongs to Munnuru Kapu Community.

He is married to Ponnala Arunadevi and has two children. He earned his M. S. Mechanical Engineering degree from Oklahoma State University in 1969.

Having come in contact with the World Bank and its programs for developing countries, he was attracted by rural development projects in India. He returned to India and worked to generate rural employment in the region of his birthplace. With his first project, he made improvements in areas such as poultry breeding, helping employ thousands of uneducated people. He also promoted the development of the dairy industry.

== Political career ==
In 1980, Ponnala began working with the Congress Party. In the 1992 Congress Plenary session at Tirupati, he successfully handled the foreign delegates, including prime ministers of neighboring countries.

In 1986, he launched a protest under the name "Samagra Pochampad Karyacharana Samithi" and worked with District Leaders to modify the irrigation scheme to benefit the chronically drought-prone area. Prime Minister P. V. Narasimha Rao laid the foundation on 30 June 1993. The project was under execution in "Jalayagnam" at a cost of Rs. 30 billion.

He served four terms in the Assembly from the Jangaon Constituency in Warangal District.

On 11 March 2014, he was named president of the newly created Telangana Pradesh Congress Committee (TPCC).

On 13 October 2023, he submitted his resignation to the Indian National Congress(INC).

On 16 October 2023, he joined Bharat Rashtra Samithi (BRS).

== Electoral history ==
Year	Constituency	Party	Votes	Opponent		Result	Margin
1985	Jangaon	INC	23,712	CPI(M)	Com. Narasimha Reddy	Lost	-22,217
1989	Jangaon	INC	45,690	TDP	Ch. Raja Reddy	Won	6,665
1994	Jangaon	INC	35,632	CPI(M)	Charagonda Raji Reddy	Lost	-24,508
1999	Jangaon	INC	47,136	TDP	Gadipally Premalatha Reddy	Won	10,883
2004	Jangaon	INC	60,041	TDP	Basava Reddy Adaboina	Won	23,293
2009	Jangaon	INC	61,218	TRS	Kommuri Pratap Reddy	Won	236
2014	Jangaon	INC	51,379	TRS	Muthireddy Yadagiri Reddy	Lost	-32,695
2018	Jangaon	INC	62,024	TRS	Muthireddy Yadagiri Reddy	Lost	-29,568

== Ponnala Foundation ==
Ponnala Lakshmaiah said that the Ponnala Foundation started by him would give away awards to mathematics genius every year in memory of the Indian math genius Srinivasa Ramanujan, in order to promote the subject among children.

== Awards ==
- Award for Outstanding Contribution by an Alumnus – Oklahoma State University (School of business) – Hall of Fame
