= Aknoor =

- village
- Location in Telangana, India Aknoor (India)
- Coordinates: 17°58′25″N 79°01′25″E
- Country: India
- State: Telangana
- District: Warangal
- Talukas: Cherial (Warangal)

Population (2001)
  - Total: 5,929

Languages
  - Official: Telugu
- Time zone: UTC+5:30 (IST)
- PIN: 506223
- Telephone code: 91 08710

Aknoor is a village panchayat in Cherial mandal in Siddipet district in the state of Telangana in south India. It was formerly in Andhra Pradesh.
