= Devaruppula =

- Mandal
- Location in Telangana, India Devaruppula (India)
- Coordinates: 17°39′04″N 79°21′20″E
- Country: India
- State: Telangana
- District: Jangaon
- Talukas: Devaruppula

Population
  - Total: 13,000+

Languages
  - Official: Telugu
- Time zone: UTC+5:30 (IST)
- Postal code: 506302
- Vehicle registration: TG 27
- Website: telangana.gov.in

Devaruppula is a village and a mandal in Jangaon district in the state of Telangana in India.
