= Falaknuma–Jangaon MEMU =

Suburban train service

Falaknuma Jangaon MEMU, is a suburban service running between Falaknuma and Jangaon in the Telangana state. The Secundrabad Division of South Central Railways of Indian Railways administers this train. The train covers 97 kilometres (60 mi) in 2 hours and 45 minutes.

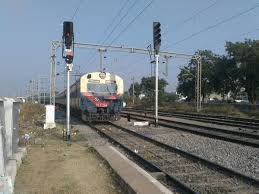
ఫలక్నుమా - జనగాం పుషపుల్ పాసెంజర్

The train runs from Falaknuma, the suburban station of Hyderabad, to Jangaon.

It is the only direct train which connects the old city of Hyderabad to Jangaon.

== Numbers ==
The rake composition is an 8 Coach power car with Engines at both ends.

- 67277 (Up) Falaknuma- Jangaon MEMU
- 67278 (Down) Jangaon-Falaknuma MEMU

== Schedule ==
Falaknuma Jangaon MEMU starts from Falaknuma at 14:10 IST and reaches Jangaon at 16:55 IST. On its return journey it starts from Jangaon at 17:10 IST and reaches Faluknauma at 20:10 IST.

The numbers are 67277 & 67278.
