= Raghunathpalle =

- village
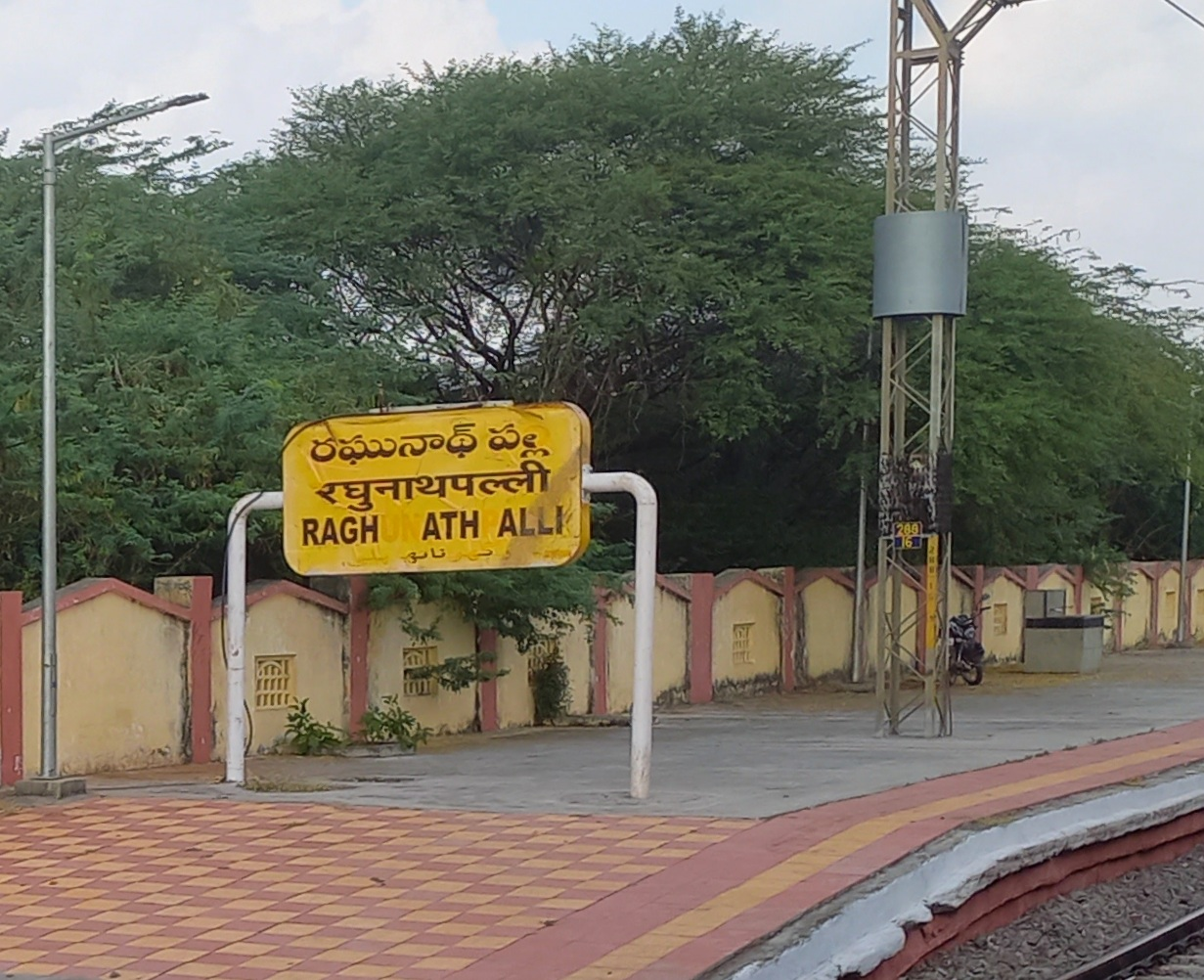
- Raghunathpalli railway station

- Location in Telangana, India Raghunathpalle (India)
- Coordinates: 17°45′45″N 79°15′25″E
- Country: India
- State: Telangana
- District: Jangaon
- Talukas: Raghunathpally

Languages
  - Official: Telugu
- Time zone: UTC+5:30 (IST)
- PIN: 506244
- Vehicle registration: TS 03
- Website: telangana.gov.in

Raghunathpalle is a village and a mandal in Jangaon district in the state of Telangana in India.
