= Lingalaghanpur =

- village
- Location in Telangana, India Lingalaghanpur (India)
- Coordinates: 17.66332°N 79.16679°E
- Country: India
- State: Telangana
- District: Jangaon
- Talukas: Lingalaghanpur

Languages
  - Official: Telugu
- Time zone: UTC+5:30 (IST)
- Vehicle registration: TS 03
- Website: telangana.gov.in

Lingalaghanpur is a village and a mandal in Jangaon district in the state of Telangana in India.
