= Medak Gulshanabad Division =

Medak Gulshanabad Division was administratively part of the Hyderabad State was made up of sixteen districts. Gulshanabad was one of four divisions which included Mahbubnagar district, Medak district, Nalgonda district (Nalgundah), and Nizamabad district.

== History ==
Medak Gulshanabad Division was part of Bidar division, and was formed in 1905.

== Districts ==
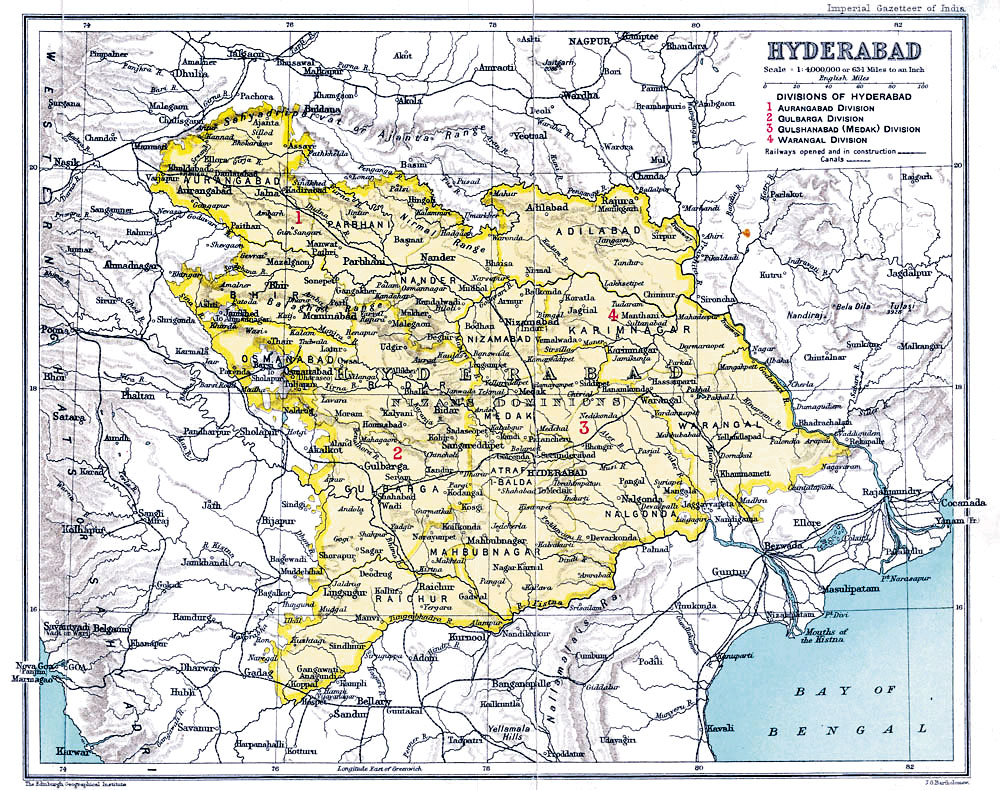
Gulshanabad Division(No.3) of Hyderabad State in 1909

- Mahbubnagar district
- Medak district
- Nalgonda district (Nalgundah)
- Nizamabad district
