= Jangaon Municipality =

Municipality in Telangana, India

Type
- Type: Municipal Council

History
- Founded: 1952

Leadership
- Chairperson: Kadakanchi Balamani
- Vice chairperson: B. Parvathalu
- Municipal commissioner: P. Venkateshwarlu

Structure
- Seats: 30
- Political groups: Government (15): INC (12); IND (2); CPIM (1); Opposition (15): BRS (13); IND (2)

Meeting place
- Municipal Office

Website
- jangoanmunicipality.telangana.gov.in

Jangaon Municipality is the civic body that oversees the civic needs of the town of Jangaon in the Indian state of Telangana.

== History ==
The first local administrator with the designation of tahsildar was appointed in 1935 by then Nizam king to Jangaon town. Tahsildar as chairman and selected five eminent persons of the town for the committee. The committee ruled for 17 years until 1952 when the first elections were held and the town was divided into 14 wards as a third grade municipality. It was upgraded to second grade in the year 2010 with 28 municipal wards. Now increased to 30 municipal wards.

== List of Chairpersons ==
List of Elected Chairpersons of Jangaon Municipality along with number of council members in wards, First Election conducted in 1952, following 1959, 1966, 1982, 1987, 1992, 2000, 2005, 2014, 2020 and 2026 held in February.

Election Year	S.No	Name	Selected Year	No.of Ward Members
1952	1	K.Jaganath Reddy	1952	14
1959	2	R.Narsimhulu	1959	17
1959	3	Venkata Narshimha Reddy	1960	17
1966	4	Venkata Narshimha Reddy	1966	20
1982	5	Vera Reddy Baskar Reddy	1982	20
1982	6	Prabhakar	1983	20
1982	7	Shiva koti	1985	20
1987	8	Dasharath	1987	20
1992	9	A.Sudhakar	1992	20
2000	10	Dr. Karnakar Raju	2000	20
2005	11	Satyanarayana Reddy	2005	24
2014	12	G.Premalatha Reddy	2014	28
2020	13	Pokala Jamuna	2020	30
2026	14	Kadakanchi Balamani	2026	30

== Jurisdiction ==
The jurisdiction of the civic body is spread over 17.49 km^{2} (6.75 sq mi).

S.No	Ward No.	Boundaries:	Locality
1	Ward No.1	5-2-8 to 5-2-8/1, 5-2-16 to 5-2-27/7, 5-2-31 to 5-2-31/2, 5-2-32 to 5-2-32/2/a, 5-4-1 to End of the block, 5-5-1 to End of the block, 5-6-1 to End of the block, Rajeen Nagar Cotony Sy.Nos 88, 89, 90 & 91 of Chitakodur (V) & Sy.Nos 795, 796, 798, 199, 200 & 201 of yeshwanthapur (V).	Rajiv Nagar Colony, Ambedkar Nagar (part).
2	Ward No.2	6-1-1 to End of the block, 6-3-1 to 6-3-45, yellamma tempre area vrith sy.No's 191,192,193 & 194 of yeshwanthapur Village.	Warangal road, Sri Ram Nagar.
3	Ward No.3	6-3-46 to End of the block, 6-2-1 to 6-2-7 /4.	Suryapet road, Balaji Nagar.
4	Ward No.4	6-2-7/4/1 to End of the block. 2-8-124/1 to End of the block.	Housing board colony, Sai Nagar.
5	Ward No.5	1-2-251, to 1-2-329/1, 1-12-1 to End of the block. 1-13-1 to End of the block.	Banapuram, Siddipet road Getha nagar.
6	Ward No.6	1-1-1 to End of the block. 1-2-1 to 1-2-88, 1-2-89 to 1-2-250, 1-2-355 to End of the block. 1-9-1 to 1-9-31, 1-3-1 to 1-3-70/12,	Vidya Nagar Colony, Tehsil office.
7	Ward No.7	1-9-32 to End of the Block. 1-10-1 to 1-10-64/36, 1-10-72/9/3 to 1-10-130, 1-4-1 to 1-4-140.	Husnabad road, Laxmibai kunta, Girnigadda (part)
8	Ward No.8	1-3-71 to End of the Block. 1-2-330 to 1-2-354, 1-4-140/2 to End of the Block, 4–2 to 4-27 Aravinda Nagar & S1,.Nos 126,127,128,131,132,142,143 & 144(p) of Shameerpet Village. 4–30 to 4-35 of Vikas Nagar & Sy.Nos 141, 144 (p), 145,146,147,148, 149 & 179 of Shamirpet Village.	Aravinda Nagar, Vikas Nagar, Girnigadda (part)
9	Ward No.9	1-5-1 to End of the Block. 1-6-1 to End of the Block.	Girnigadda (part)
10	Ward No.10	1-7-1 to End of the Block. 1-8-1 to End of the Block. 1-10-142/3 to 1-10-142/3-5, 1-10-64/37/1 to 1-10-72/9/2, 1-10-181 to End of the Block.	Girnigadda (part), Grain Market.
11	Ward No.11	1-10-131 to 1-10-142/2, 1-10-143 to 1-10-180, 1-11-92/9 to 1-11-92/15.	Chitakodur road, Weaver's Colony (part)
12	Ward No.12	1-11-1 to 1-11-92, 1-11-93 to End of the Block.	Weaver's Colony (part)
13	Ward No.13	5-2-1 to 5-2-3, 5-2-9 to 5-2-11, 5-2-28 to 5-2-30/11, 5-2-37/ 3 to 5-2-31/5, 5-2-32/3 to 5-2-37, 5-2-40 to 5-2-45/4, 5-2-50/7 to 5-2-20, 5-2-73 to 5-3-78/7, 5-2-80 to 5-2-102, 4-9-1 to End of the Block. 4-10-1 to 4-10-46/A, 4-8-58/1 to End of the Block.	Sanjay Nagar, Ambedkar Nagar (part).
14	Ward No.14	5-2-38 to 5-2-39, 5-2-48 to 5-2-49, 5-2-71/7 to 5-2-71/A, 5-2-7 8/56, 5-2-77 4 to 5 -2-129, 5-2-131 to 5-2-135/1, 5-2-135/2, 5-2-135/3, 5-2-135/4 to 5-2-735/7/2, 5-2-136 to 5-2-136/2, 5-3--l to End of the Block.	Ambedkar Nagar (part).
15	Ward No.15	5-1-1 to End of the Block. 5-2-173/5, 5-2-130/a, 5-2-135/8-A to 5-2-135/35, 4-11-1 to End of the Block.	Indira Nagar, Muslim minority colony.
16	Ward No.16	4-12-1 to End of the Block. 4-13-1 to 4-13-20, 4-10-47 to End of the Block. 4-11-1 to End of the Block.	Dharmakancha (part).
17	Ward No.17	4-5-5 to 4-5-58, 4-6-4 to 4-6-22/6/2/a, 4-6-22/6/4 to 4-6-84/4.	Venkanna kunta, Police quarters.
18	Ward No.18	2-11-1 to End of the Block. 4-5-1 to 4-5-4, 4-5-59 to End of the Block.	Bhavani Nagar, Ganesh Street (part).
19	Ward No.19	2-9-7 to End of the Block. 2-10-1 to End of the Block. 3-1-1 to 3-1-40	Bus station road, Ganesh Street (part).
20	Ward No.20	2-6-114/3/3 to 2-6-120, 2-7-1 to End of the Block.	Kurmawada (part).
21	Ward No.21	2-5-90/9 to 2-5-128, 2-5-130 to 2-5-130/3/7, 2-5-730/9-2 to 2-5-130/12, 2-5-130/16/4 to End of the Block (excluding 2-5-130/1-3 & 2-5-131), 2-6-7 to 2-6_97/2, 2-6-121 to End of the Block.	Nehru park road, Kurmawada (part).
22	Ward No.22	2-8-1 to 2-8-124, 2-6-91/2-1 to 2-6-114/3/2, 2-5-130/3/8 to 2-5-120/9-1, 2-5-130/13 to 2-5-130/16-3, 2-5-129, 2-5-130/1-3, 2-5-131,	Hyderabad road, Kurmawada (part).
23	Ward No.23	2-5-1 to 2-5-90/8	Berappa temple road, Kurmawada (part).
24	Ward No.24	2-2-101 to End of the Block. 2-3-7 to End of the Block. 3-4-81 to End of the Block. 2-4-1 to End of the Block.	Old beet bazar, Nagula kunta.
25	Ward No.25	3-1-41 to End of the Block. 3-2-1 to End of the Block. 3-3-1 to End of the Block. 3-4-1 to 3-4-80, 3-5-1 to 3-5-69.	Nehru park road, Mahankali street.
26	Ward No.26	3-6-1 to End of the Block. 3-7-7 to End of the Block. 3-8-70 to End of the Block. 3-5-70 to End of the Block.	Reddy street, Ganesh Street (part).
27	Ward No.27	2-1-1 to End of the Block. 2-2-1 to 2-2-100 3-8-1 to 3-8-69 3-9-1 to End of the Block. 3-11-1 to 3-11-20.	Railway station road, Reddy street (part).
28	Ward No.28	3-10-1 to End of the Block. 3-11-21 to End of the Block. 4-1-1 to End of the Block. 4-2-1 to 4-2-105	Railway quarters, Gundla gadda (part).
29	Ward No.29	4-2-106 to End of the Block. 4-3-1 to End of the Block. 4-4-31 to End of the Block.	Gundla gadda (part), Dharmakancha (part).
30	Ward No.30	4-4-1 to 4-4-30/1, 4-7-1 to End of the Block, 4-8-1 to 4-8-58, 4-6-1 to 4-6-3, 4-6-22/6/3 to 4-6-22/6/3/a, 4-6-84/5 to End of the Block.	Dharmakancha (part).

== Election 2026 ==
Election was held on 11 February 2026, counting and results came on 13 February 2026. There are 44,045 voters in 30 wards. The position of Chair-person was assigned to the BC General

=== Political parties performance ===
S.No.	Party name	Party flag	No. of Counselors
01	Bharat Rashtra Samithi (BRS)		13
02	Indian National Congress (INC)		12
03	Communist Party of India (Marxist) (CPI(M))		01
04	Others		04

=== List of Councilors ===
Ward No.	Name of Councilor	Votes	Majority	Party
1	Sajja Durgaprasad	689	244	BRS
2	Ramagalla Vijay Kumar	621	56	INC
3	Jyothi Budidha	602	83	CPM
4	Manthri Sumalatha	806	428	INC
5	Middepakka Bhaskar	510	88	IND
6	Bala Bharawad Bukka	484	95	INC
7	Kamar	421	159	BRS
8	Manjuala Sandupatla	470	149	IND
9	Guniganti Vennela	481	83	BRS
10	Rajini Neerati	491	174	INC
11	Yenaganduka Anusha	506	161	BRS
12	Vanga Uma	655	55	INC
13	Panuganti Suvartha	698	10	BRS
14	Andalu Thriruvaippadi	557	186	INC
15	Maraboina Pandu	592	253	IND
16	Kadamanchi Susheela	676	398	INC
17	Udugula Kistaiah	580	114	BRS
18	Gopagani Sugnakar	687	560	BRS
19	Anitha Dornala	435	51	INC
20	Rama Daavera	746	318	BRS
21	Rajitha Mamidala	653	364	BRS
22	Kadakanchi Balamani	500	17	INC
23	Parvathalu Bhoosha	508	28	IND
24	Gangaraboina Antha	472	65	BRS
25	Pamukuntla Prasad Kumar	518	182	INC
26	Sevekki Madhusudan	484	66	BRS
27	Chencharapu Karnakar Reddy	440	105	INC
28	Hafeez Fathima	724	522	BRS
29	Mustiyala Mounika	660	437	BRS
30	Arutla Ram Narsimha Reddy	754	276	INC

== Election 2020 ==
Election held on 23 January 2020, counting and results came on 25 January 2020. There were 40,099 voters in 30 wards. The position of Chair-person was assigned to the General (Woman).

=== Political parties performance ===
S.No.	Party name	Party flag	No. of Counselors
01	Bharat Rashtra Samithi (BRS)		13
02	Indian National Congress (INC)		10
03	Bharatiya Janata Party (BJP)		04
04	Others		03

=== List of Councilors ===
Ward No.	Name of Councilor	Votes	Majority	Party
1	Aurana Ramagalla	377	112	INC
2	Anitha Vankudothu	500	207	BRS
3	Pagdipati Sudha	344	72	BRS
4	Manthri Sumalatha	621	251	INC
5	Devarai Nagaraju	426	66	IND
6	Vangala Kalyani	401	18	INC
7	Mallavaram Aravind Reddy	352	41	BRS
8	Talla Suresh Reddy	508	166	BRS
9	Chander Mustyala	287	8	INC
10	Sreeja Neela	428	246	IND
11	Paka Rama	600	285	BRS
12	Gurram Bhulaxmi	695	273	BRS
13	Malligari Chandrakala	546	1	INC
14	Perni swaroopa	423	20	BRS
15	Maraboina Pandu	789	201	INC
16	Ramachander Gadepaka	430	44	INC
17	Anitha Juakkula	515	81	INC
18	Gadipelli Premalatha Reddy	430	65	BJP
19	Banda Padma	506	139	BRS
20	Jookanti Laxmi	520	58	BRS
21	Karre Srinivas	642	402	BRS
22	Balde Kamalamma	539	140	INC
23	Mekala Ramprasad	686	592	BRS
24	Gangaraboina Mallesh	497	108	INC
25	Udugula Srilatha	301	2	BJP
26	Jamuna Pokala	571	291	BRS
27	Mahankali Harichander	169	2	BJP
28	Mohammad Samad	355	291	BRS
29	Dayakar Musthyala	405	124	IND
30	Srinivas Botla	374	126	BJP

== Election 2014 ==
Elections were held on 30 March 2014. There were 35,934 voters in the municipality. The position of Chair-person was assigned to the General (Woman).

=== Political parties performance ===
S.No.	Party name	Party flag	No. of Counselors
01	Bharat Rashtra Samithi (BRS)		06
02	Indian National Congress (INC)		14
03	Bharatiya Janata Party (BJP)		04
04	Communist Party of India (Marxist) (CPI(M))		01
05	Others		03

=== List of Counselors ===
Ward No.	Name of Counselors	Votes	Majority	Political Party
1	Upender Kannarapu	297	1	BRS
2	Gajjela Narsi Reddy	605	125	INC
3	Janardhan Reddy Konyala	526	183	BRS
4	Manga Satyanarayana	607	295	INC
5	Aleti Laxmi	476	170	INC
6	Banda Padma	413	96	BRS
7	Gadipelli Premalatha Reddy	525	362	BRS
8	Anitha Juakkula	593	258	INC
9	Venkatesh Nagarapu	268	2	BJP
10	Ramya Vadalyalam	426	186	BRS
11	Meda Srinivas	523	222	INC
12	Kadakanchi Pedda Mallamma	591	202	BJP
13	Sugna Botla	402	52	CPI(M)
14	Dharmapuri Srinivas	617	387	INC
15	Anwar Mohammad	624	438	INC
17	Panniru Radhika	302	50	INC
18	Vemalla Padma	501	127	INC
19	Ullengala Navya Sri	299	20	Independent
20	Mekala Ram Prasad	764	564	INC
21	Devarai Yellesh	406	61	BJP
