= Kodakandla =

- village
- Location in Telangana, India Kodakandla (India)
- Coordinates: 17.528°N 79.5052°E
- Country: India
- State: Telangana
- District: Jangaon
- Talukas: Kodakandla

Government
  - Type: Grama Panchayath

Languages
  - Official: Telugu
- Time zone: UTC+5:30 (IST)
- PIN: 506222
- Telephone code: 08716
- Vehicle registration: TG
- Website: www.kodakandla.org

Kodakandla is a village and a mandal in Jangaon district in the state of Telangana in India. It was formerly part of Warangal district before the division of that entity.

In 2023 the State government planned the construction of a textile park in the village.
