= Cherial, Hanamkonda district =

Cherial
- village
- Location in Telangana, India Cherial (India)
- Coordinates: 17.920253°N 79.00285°E
- Country: India
- State: Telangana
- District: Siddipet
- Talukas: Cherial

Population (2001)
  - Total: 17,281

Languages
  - Official: Telugu
- Time zone: UTC+5:30 (IST)
- PIN: 506223
- Telephone code: 91 08710
- Vehicle registration: TS 03
- Website: telangana.gov.in

Cherial is a village Municipality in Siddipet district in the center of Telangana state in India.

== Geography ==
Gram panchayats in Cherial mandal:

- Cherial
- Aknoor
- Chityal
- Chunchanakota
- Danampalle
- Dommata
- Gurjakunta
- Kadavergu
- Kasha Gudiselu
- Kotha Dommata
- Musthiyala
- Nagapuri
- Pedarajupet
- Rampur
- Shabhash Gudem
- Tadoor
- [Vechareni] వేచరేణి
- Veerannapet
- Kamalayapally
- Arjunapatla
