= List of states in India by past population =

Population density map of India.

India is a union of twenty-eight states and eight union territories. As of 2011, with an estimated population of 1.210 billion, India occupies 2.4 percent of the world's land surface area but is home to 17.5 percent of the world's population. The Indo-Gangetic Plain is among the most densely populated areas of the world. The eastern and western coastal regions of Deccan Traps are also densely populated regions of India. The Thar Desert in western Rajasthan is one of the most densely populated deserts in the world. The northern and north-eastern states along the Himalayas contain cold arid deserts with fertile valleys. These states have less population density due to indomitable physical barriers.

== Census of India ==
The first population census in India was conducted in 1873. Since then the a decennial census has been conducted in 1881, 1891, 1901, 1911, 1921, 1931, and 1941 by the Government. Since India's independence in 1947, a census has been carried out every 10 years by the Indian Government, starting from 1951. The census in India is carried out by the Office of the Registrar General and Census Commissioner under the Ministry of Home Affairs, and is one of the largest administrative tasks conducted by a federal government.

Latest population figures are based on data from the 2011 census of India. During the decade of 2001–2011, India's annual population rising rate has slowed down from 2.15 to 1.76. Based on decennial census data, Dadra and Nagar Haveli shows the highest growth rate of 55.5 percent. It is followed by Daman and Diu (53.5 percent), Meghalaya (27.8 percent) and Arunachal Pradesh (25.9 percent). Nagaland recorded the lowest growth rate of -0.5 percent.

India has 641,000 inhabited villages and 72.2 percent of the total population reside in these rural areas. Of them, 145,000 villages have a population size of 500–999 persons; 130,000 villages have a population size of 1000–1999 and 128,000 villages have a population size of 200–499. There are 3,961 villages that have a population of 10,000 persons or more. India's 27.8 percent urban population lives in more than 5,100 towns and over 380 urban agglomerations. In the decade of 1991–2001, migration to major cities caused a rapid increase in urban population. On the basis of net migrants by last residence during the past decade, Maharashtra had the most immigration with 2.3 million, followed by the National Capital Territory of Delhi (1.7 million), Gujarat (0.68 million) and Haryana (0.67 million). Uttar Pradesh (−2.6 million) and Bihar (−1.7 million) topped the list for interstate emigration. The four states of Uttar Pradesh, Maharashtra, Bihar, and West Bengal account for almost half (48.89 percent) of the total Indian population.

== By past population (1947-2011) ==
The total geographical area of India is 3,287,263 square kilometres (1,269,219 sq mi). As per census data 2011, the total population of India is: 1,210,193,422.

Administrative divisions		Population as per Census						
Emblem	Name	1951	1961	1971	1981	1991	2001	2011
States
	Uttar Pradesh	60,274,800	70,144,160	83,849,775	105,113,300	132,062,800	166,053,600	199,581,477
	Maharashtra	32,002,500	39,554,900	50,412,240	62,782,820	78,937,190	96,752,500	112,372,972
	Bihar	29,085,900	34,841,490	42,126,800	52,303,000	64,531,200	82,879,910	103,804,630
	West Bengal	26,300,670	34,926,000	44,312,017	54,580,650	68,077,970	80,221,300	91,347,736
	Madhya Pradesh	18,615,700	23,218,950	30,017,180	38,169,500	48,566,800	60,385,090	72,597,565
	Tamil Nadu	30,119,680	33,687,100	41,199,170	48,408,080	55,859,300	62,111,390	72,138,958
	Rajasthan	15,971,130	20,156,540	25,765,810	34,361,860	44,005,990	56,473,300	68,621,012
	Karnataka	19,402,500	23,587,910	29,299,015	37,135,710	44,977,200	52,734,986	61,130,704
	Gujarat	16,263,700	20,633,305	26,697,488	34,085,800	41,309,580	50,597,200	60,383,628
	Andhra Pradesh	31,115,000	35,983,480	43,502,710	53,551,030	66,508,170	75,728,400	84,580,777
	Odisha	14,646,100	17,549,500	21,944,625	26,370,270	31,659,740	36,707,900	41,947,358
	Telangana	N/A	N/A	N/A	N/A	N/A	N/A	35,193,978
	Kerala	13,549,000	16,904,560	21,347,300	25,453,680	29,098,523	31,839,000	33,387,677
	Jharkhand	9,697,300	11,606,504	14,227,493	17,612,000	21,844,550	26,946,070	32,988,134
	Assam	8,029,100	10,837,700	14,625,157	18,041,250	22,414,320	26,638,600	31,169,272
	Punjab	9,160,990	11,135,404	13,551,069	16,788,920	20,281,971	24,289,130	27,704,236
	Haryana	5,674,400	7,591,190	10,036,430	12,922,122	16,464,600	21,083,900	25,753,081
	Chhattisgarh	7,457,700	9,154,330	11,637,800	14,010,110	17,615,600	20,834,530	25,540,196
	Uttarakhand	2,946,900	3,611,200	4,493,800	5,726,550	7,051,600	8,489,100	10,116,752
	Himachal Pradesh	2,386,940	2,812,300	3,460,434	4,280,818	5,170,877	6,077,453	6,856,509
	Tripura	639,984	1,142,282	1,556,342	2,053,058	2,757,205	3,191,880	3,671,032
	Meghalaya	606,300	769,990	1,011,699	1,335,819	1,774,778	2,306,540	2,964,007
	Manipur	578,060	780,340	1,073,509	1,421,290	1,837,900	2,294,480	2,721,756
	Nagaland	213,700	369,309	516,110	775,570	1,210,492	1,990,275	1,980,602
Goa, India	Goa	547,000	590,875	795,997	1,008,373	1,170,115	1,348,900	1,457,723
	Arunachal Pradesh	NA	337,300	468,885	632,502	865,900	1,098,328	1,382,611
	Mizoram	196,970	266,200	332,190	494,440	690,963	889,690	1,091,014
Government of Sikkim	Sikkim	138,093	162,863	210,205	316,840	406,000	541,902	607,688
Union territories
	Jammu and Kashmir	3,254,650	3,561,100	4,616,632	5,987,389	7,718,700	10,070,300	12,548,926
Delhi Capital Territory	Delhi	1,744,500	2,659,990	4,066,400	6,220,973	9,421,311	13,851,503	16,753,235
	Puducherry	317,407	369,355	472,836	604,281	808,117	974,820	1,244,464
	Chandigarh	24,948	120,480	257,100	452,960	642,374	901,080	1,054,686
	Andaman and Nicobar Islands	31,480	64,160	115,874	189,496	281,990	356,650	379,944
	Dadra and Nagar Haveli	42,846	58,020	74,880	104,300	138,290	220,963	342,853
	Daman and Diu	49,482	37,587	63,000	79,842	102,110	158,080	242,911
	Lakshadweep	21,000	24,370	32,900	40,250	52,820	61,300	64,429
India		361,088,400	439,235,720	548,160,050	683,329,900	846,421,830	1,028,737,690	1,210,193,422

== See also ==
- List of Indian states and union territories by GDP
- Demographics of India
- List of metropolitan areas in India
- Census in British India
- 2011 census of India
