= Jangaon district =

- District of Telangana
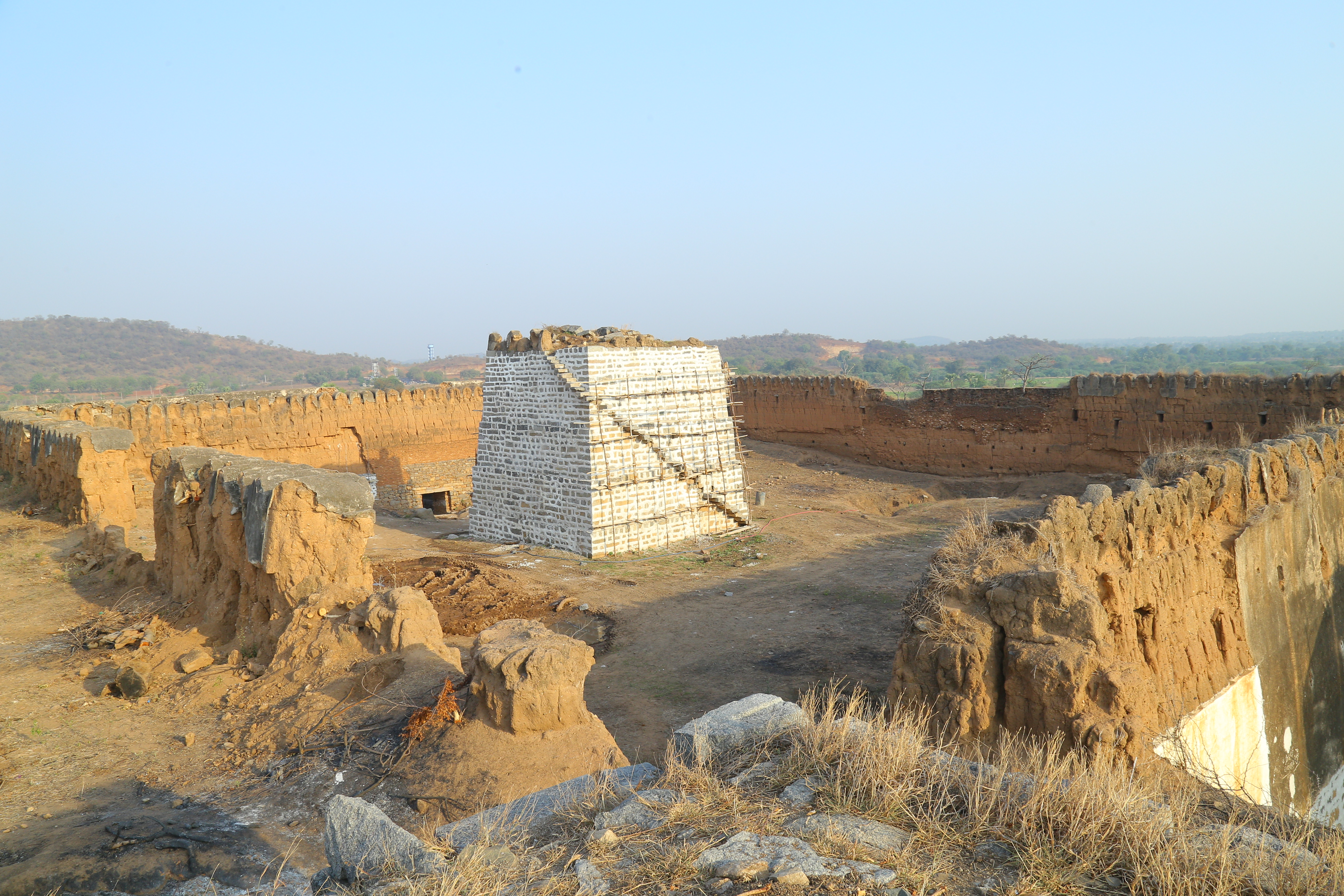
- Khilashapur Fort in Janagama
- Interactive map of Jangaon district
- Country: India
- State: Telangana
- Established: 11 October 2016
- Reorganisation: 17 February 2019
- Headquarters: Janagama
- Mandalas: 12

Government
  - District collector: Sri Rizwanbasha Shaik, IAS
  - Assembly constituencies: 3
- Area: 2,027 km^{2} (783 sq mi)
- Population (2011): 534,991
  - Density: 263.9/km^{2} (683.6/sq mi)
  - Urban: 71,357

Demographics
  - Literacy: 61.4%
  - Sex ratio: 997
- Time zone: UTC+05:30 (IST)
- Vehicle registration: TG–27
- Major highways: NH 163
- Average annual precipitation: 788 mm
- Website: jangaon.telangana.gov.in

Jangaon district is a district in the middle of the Indian state of Telangana. The district shares boundaries with Suryapet, Yadadri, Warangal, Hanamkonda, Siddipet and Mahabubabad districts.

== Geography ==
The district is spread over an area of 2,027 square kilometres (783 sq mi).

== History ==
Jangaon District was formed on 11 October 2016, Jangaon is made as the district headquarters along with 21 newly formed district in Telangana. Warangal district was divided into five districts: Warangal Urban district (now Hanamkonda district), Warangal Rural district (now Warangal district), Jangaon district, Jayashankar district and Mahabubabad district. The Jangaon district was formed with mostly old Jangaon Revenue division except Maddur, Cherial and Newly formed Komuravelli Mandals which were transferred to newly formed Siddipet district, Ghanpur and Zaffergadh from Warangal Revenue division and Gundala of Nalgonda district were merged with Jangaon district. Gundala was later transferred to Yadadri Bhuvanagiri district. The Telugu poet Bammera Pothana was born in the village of Bammera in Jangoan in 1450 AD.

== Demographics ==
Religion in Jangaon district (2011)
Hinduism	95.66%
Islam	3.23%
Christianity	0.91%
Other or not stated	0.20%

At the time of the 2011 census, Jangaon had a population of 534,991. Jangaon has a sex ratio of females per 1000 males and a literacy rate of 61.60%. 52,085 (9.74%) were under 6 years of age. 71,357 (13.34%) lived in urban areas. Scheduled Castes and Scheduled Tribes made up 112,256 (20.98%) and 62,224 (11.63%) of the population respectively.

Languages of Jangaon district (2011)
1. Telugu (86.2%)
2. Lambadi (10.2%)
3. Urdu (2.72%)
4. Others (0.84%)

At the time of the 2011 census, 86.24% of the population spoke Telugu, 10.20% Lambadi and 2.72% Urdu as their first language.

== Climate ==
Jangaon experiences a tropical kind of climate. It's a drought prone area according to Geological survey. Experiences very hot summers, moderate winters and rains less than the average precipitation.

The temperatures are highest on average in May, at around 33.9 °C. In December, the average temperature is 22.0 °C. It is the lowest average temperature of the whole year. The variation in the precipitation between the driest and wettest months is 182 mm. The average temperatures vary during the year by 11.9 °C.

Climate data for Jangaon District
Month	Jan	Feb	Mar	Apr	May	Jun	Jul	Aug	Sep	Oct	Nov	Dec	Year
Mean daily maximum °C (°F)	29.7 (85.5)	32.4 (90.3)	36.0 (96.8)	38.4 (101.1)	40.4 (104.7)	35.9 (96.6)	31.1 (88.0)	30.8 (87.4)	31.0 (87.8)	31.4 (88.5)	29.6 (85.3)	28.8 (83.8)	33.0 (91.3)
Mean daily minimum °C (°F)	16.3 (61.3)	18.6 (65.5)	21.7 (71.1)	25.0 (77.0)	27.5 (81.5)	25.8 (78.4)	23.7 (74.7)	23.6 (74.5)	23.2 (73.8)	21.4 (70.5)	17.6 (63.7)	15.2 (59.4)	21.6 (71.0)
Average precipitation mm (inches)	1 (0.0)	2 (0.1)	5 (0.2)	21 (0.8)	17 (0.7)	119 (4.7)	183 (7.2)	167 (6.6)	168 (6.6)	78 (3.1)	21 (0.8)	8 (0.3)	790 (31.1)

== Administrative divisions ==
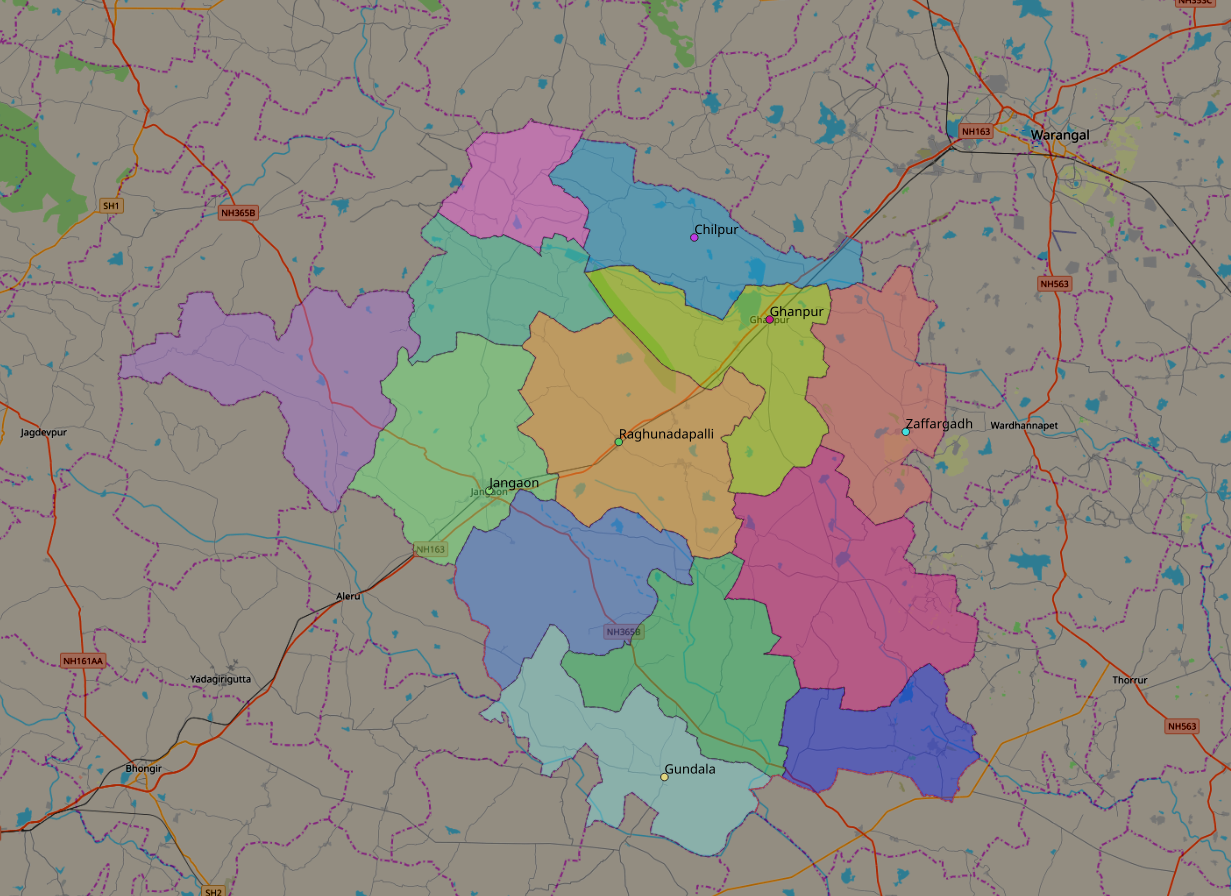
Jangaon district from 2016 to 2019, Gundala Mandal transferred to Yadadri Bhuvanagiri District

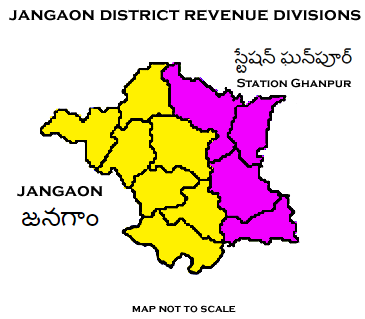
Jangaon District Revenue divisions

The district has two revenue divisions of Jangaon and Ghanpur (Station) are sub-divided into 12 mandals. Sri Ch.Shivalingaiah, IAS is the present collector of the district.

=== Mandals ===
The below table categorises 12 mandals into their respective revenue divisions in the district:

S.No.	Jangaon revenue division	S.No.	Station Ghanpur revenue division
1	Bachannapeta	8	Chilpur
2	Devaruppala	9	Zaffergadh
3	Tarigoppula	10	Kodakandla
4	Jangaon	11	Palakurthi
5	Lingalaghanpur	12	Station Ghanpur
6	Narmetta		
7	Raghunathapalle		

Gundala mandal was formerly in Jangaon district, it is now in Yadadri Bhuvanagiri district.

== Notable personalities ==
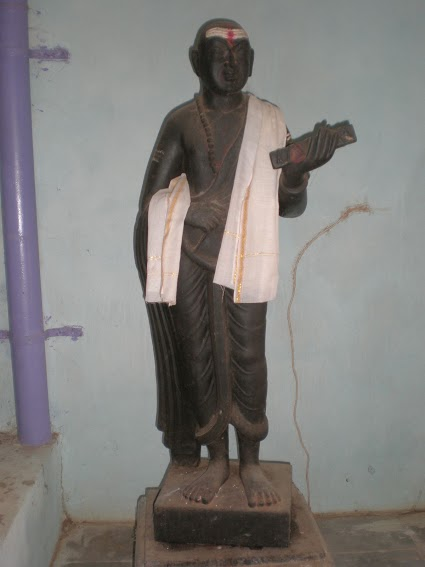
Statue of Bammera Pothana in Bammera village of Jangoan district

- Bammera Pothana
- Palkuriki Somanatha

== See also ==
- List of districts in Telangana
