= 2nd Telangana Assembly =

Legislature of Telangana since 2019

Second Telangana Legislative Assembly
←	1st Telangana Assembly	3rd Telangana Assembly	→
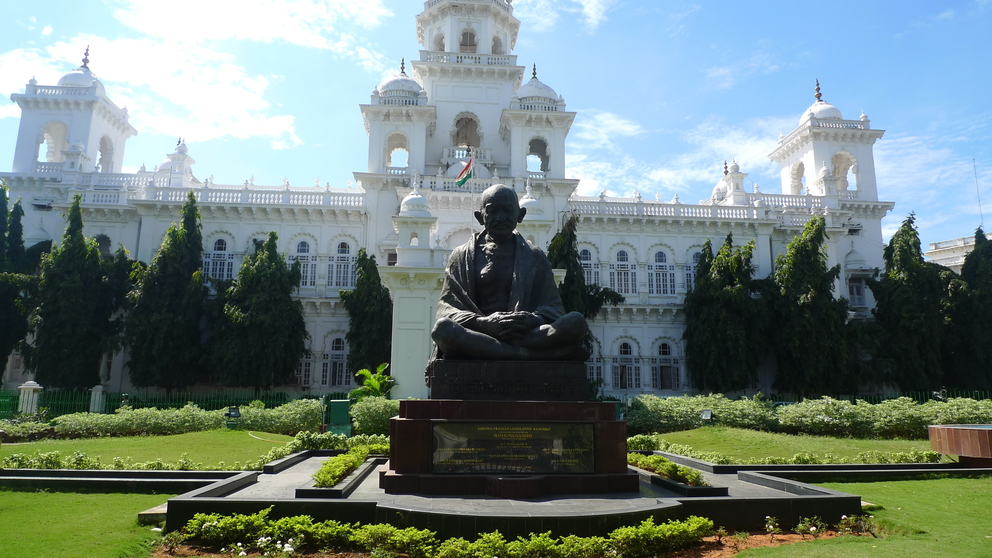

Overview
- Legislative body: Telangana Legislative Assembly
- Meeting place: Assembly Building, Hyderabad, Telangana, India
- Term: 13 December 2018 – 6 December 2023
- Election: 2018 Telangana Legislative Assembly election
- Government: TRS
- Opposition: Vacant
- Government (99) TRS (99) Official Opposition Vacant Other Opposition (15) INC (7) AIMIM (7) BJP (5)
- Members: 119
- Speaker: Pocharam Srinivas Reddy
- Deputy Speaker: T. Padma Rao Goud
- Chief Minister: K. Chandrashekar Rao
- Leader of the Opposition: Vacant

The Second Legislative Assembly of Telangana was constituted after the 2018 Telangana Legislative Assembly elections which were concluded earlier on 7 December 2018 and the results were announced on 11 December 2018.

== Composition ==
=== Presiding officers ===
S.No	Position	Portrait	Name	Party	Constituency	Office Taken
1	Speaker		Pocharam Srinivas Reddy	Bharat Rashtra Samiti	Banswada	17 January 2019
2	Deputy Speaker		T. Padma Rao Goud	Bharat Rashtra Samiti	Secunderabad	25 February 2019
3	Leader of the House		K. Chandrashekar Rao	Bharat Rashtra Samiti	Gajwel	2 June 2014
4	Leader of Opposition		Bhatti Vikramarka Mallu	Indian National Congress	Madhira	18 January 2019
4	Leader of Opposition		Vacant			6 June 2019

=== Members ===
Party	Members	
Party	December 2018	December 2023
Bharat Rashtra Samithi	88	99
Indian National Congress	19	7
Telugu Desam Party	2	0
All India Majlis-e-Ittehadul Muslimeen	7	7
Bharatiya Janata Party	1	5
Total	119	

== Members of Legislative Assembly ==
#	Name	Candidate	Party	Remarks
Adilabad District
1	Sirpur	Koneru Konappa	Telangana Rashtra Samithi	
2	Chennur (SC)	Balka Suman	Telangana Rashtra Samithi	
3	Bellampalli (SC)	Durgam Chinnaiah	Telangana Rashtra Samithi	
4	Mancherial	Diwakar Rao Nadipelli	Telangana Rashtra Samithi	
5	Asifabad (ST)	Athram Sakku	Indian National Congress	Defected from INC to TRS
5	Asifabad (ST)	Athram Sakku	Telangana Rashtra Samithi	Defected from INC to TRS
6	Khanapur (ST)	Ajmeera Rekha	Telangana Rashtra Samithi	Defected from TRS to INC
6	Khanapur (ST)	Ajmeera Rekha	Indian National Congress	Defected from TRS to INC
7	Adilabad	Jogu Ramanna	Telangana Rashtra Samithi	
8	Boath (ST)	Rathod Bapu Rao	Telangana Rashtra Samithi	Defected from TRS to BJP
8	Boath (ST)	Rathod Bapu Rao	Bharatiya Janata Party	Defected from TRS to BJP
9	Nirmal	Allola Indrakaran Reddy	Telangana Rashtra Samithi	
10	Mudhole	Gaddigari Vittal Reddy	Telangana Rashtra Samithi	
Nizamabad District
11	Armur	Asannagari Jeevan Reddy	Telangana Rashtra Samithi	
12	Bodhan	Shakil Aamir Mohammed	Telangana Rashtra Samithi	
13	Jukkal (SC)	Hanmanth Shinde	Telangana Rashtra Samithi	
14	Banswada	Pocharam Srinivas Reddy	Telangana Rashtra Samithi	
15	Yellareddy	Jajala Surender	Indian National Congress	Defected from INC to TRS
15	Yellareddy	Jajala Surender	Telangana Rashtra Samithi	Defected from INC to TRS
16	Kamareddy	Gampa Govardhan	Telangana Rashtra Samithi	
17	Nizamabad (Urban)	Bigala Ganesh	Telangana Rashtra Samithi	
18	Nizamabad (Rural)	Baji Reddy Goverdhan	Telangana Rashtra Samithi	
19	Balkonda	Vemula Prashanth Reddy	Telangana Rashtra Samithi	
Karimnagar District
20	Koratla	Kalvakuntla Vidya Sagar Rao	Telangana Rashtra Samithi	
21	Jagtial	M Sanjay Kumar	Telangana Rashtra Samithi	
22	Dharmapuri (SC)	Koppula Eshwar	Telangana Rashtra Samithi	
23	Ramagundam	Korukanti Chandar	All India Forward Bloc	Defected from AIFB to TRS
23	Ramagundam	Korukanti Chandar	Telangana Rashtra Samithi	Defected from AIFB to TRS
24	Manthani	Sridhar Babu	Indian National Congress	
25	Peddapalle	Dasari Manohar Reddy	Telangana Rashtra Samithi	
26	Karimnagar	Gangula Kamalakar	Telangana Rashtra Samithi	
27	Choppadandi (SC)	Ravi Shankar Sunke	Telangana Rashtra Samithi	
28	Vemulawada	Chennamaneni Ramesh	Telangana Rashtra Samithi	
29	Sircilla	K. T. Rama Rao	Telangana Rashtra Samithi	
30	Manakondur (SC)	Rasamayi Balakishan	Telangana Rashtra Samithi	
31	Huzurabad	Etela Rajender	Telangana Rashtra Samithi	Resigned and won in bypoll
31	Huzurabad	Etela Rajender	Bharatiya Janata Party	Resigned and won in bypoll
32	Husnabad	Vodithela Sathish Kumar	Telangana Rashtra Samithi	
Medak District
33	Siddipet	T. Harish Rao	Telangana Rashtra Samithi	
34	Medak	Padma Devender Reddy	Telangana Rashtra Samithi	
35	Narayankhed	Mahareddy Bhupal Reddy	Telangana Rashtra Samithi	
36	Andole (SC)	Kranthi Kiran Chanti	Telangana Rashtra Samithi	
37	Narsapur	Chilumula Madan Reddy	Telangana Rashtra Samithi	
38	Zahirabad (SC)	Koninty Manik Rao	Telangana Rashtra Samithi	
39	Sangareddy	Turupu Jayaprakash Reddy	Indian National Congress	
40	Patancheru	Gudem Mahipal Reddy	Telangana Rashtra Samithi	
41	Dubbak	Solipeta Ramalinga Reddy	Telangana Rashtra Samithi	Death of the MLA
41	Dubbak	M. Raghunandan Rao	Bharatiya Janata Party	Elected in 2021 bypoll
42	Gajwel	K. Chandrashekar Rao	Telangana Rashtra Samithi	
Ranga Reddy District
43	Medchal	Malla Reddy	Telangana Rashtra Samithi	
44	Malkajgiri	Mynampally Hanumantha Rao	Telangana Rashtra Samithi	Defected from TRS to INC
44	Malkajgiri	Mynampally Hanumantha Rao	Indian National Congress	Defected from TRS to INC
45	Quthbullapur	KP Vivekananda	Telangana Rashtra Samithi	
46	Kukatpally	Madhavaram Krishna Rao	Telangana Rashtra Samithi	
47	Uppal	Bethi Subhas Reddy	Telangana Rashtra Samithi	
48	Ibrahimpatnam	Manchireddy Kishan Reddy	Telangana Rashtra Samithi	
49	L. B. Nagar	Devireddy Sudheer Reddy	Indian National Congress	Defected from INC to TRS
49	L. B. Nagar	Devireddy Sudheer Reddy	Telangana Rashtra Samithi	Defected from INC to TRS
50	Maheshwaram	Sabitha Indra Reddy	Indian National Congress	Defected from INC to TRS
50	Maheshwaram	Sabitha Indra Reddy	Telangana Rashtra Samithi	Defected from INC to TRS
51	Rajendranagar	T Prakash Goud	Telangana Rashtra Samithi	
52	Serilingampally	Arekapudi Gandhi	Telangana Rashtra Samithi	
53	Chevella (SC)	Kale Yadaiah	Telangana Rashtra Samithi	
54	Pargi	K Mahesh Reddy	Telangana Rashtra Samithi	
55	Vicarabad (SC)	Anand Methuku	Telangana Rashtra Samithi	
56	Tandur	Pilot Rohith Reddy	Indian National Congress	Defected from INC to TRS
56	Tandur	Pilot Rohith Reddy	Telangana Rashtra Samithi	Defected from INC to TRS
Hyderabad District
57	Musheerabad	Muta Gopal	Telangana Rashtra Samithi	
58	Malakpet	Ahmed Bin Abdullah Balala	All India Majlis-e-Ittehadul Muslimeen	
59	Amberpet	K. Venkatesham	Telangana Rashtra Samithi	
60	Khairatabad	Danam Nagender	Telangana Rashtra Samithi	
61	Jubilee Hills	Maganti Gopinath	Telangana Rashtra Samithi	
62	Sanathnagar	Talasani Srinivas Yadav	Telangana Rashtra Samithi	
63	Nampally	Jaffer Hussain	All India Majlis-e-Ittehadul Muslimeen	
64	Karwan	Kausar Mohiuddin	All India Majlis-e-Ittehadul Muslimeen	
65	Goshamahal	T. Raja Singh	Bharatiya Janata Party	Suspended by BJP in August 2022. Suspension revoked in October 2023.
65	Goshamahal	T. Raja Singh	Independent	Suspended by BJP in August 2022. Suspension revoked in October 2023.
65	Goshamahal	T. Raja Singh	Bharatiya Janata Party	Suspended by BJP in August 2022. Suspension revoked in October 2023.
66	Charminar	Mumtaz Ahmed Khan	All India Majlis-e-Ittehadul Muslimeen	
67	Chandrayangutta	Akbaruddin Owaisi	All India Majlis-e-Ittehadul Muslimeen	
68	Yakutpura	Syed Ahmed Pasha Quadri	All India Majlis-e-Ittehadul Muslimeen	
69	Bahadurpura	Mohammad Moazam Khan	All India Majlis-e-Ittehadul Muslimeen	
70	Secunderabad	T. Padma Rao Goud	Telangana Rashtra Samithi	
71	Secunderabad Cantt (SC)	G. Sayanna	Telangana Rashtra Samithi	Death of G Sayanna
71	Secunderabad Cantt (SC)	Vacant		Death of G Sayanna
Mahabubnagar District
72	Kodangal	Patnam Narender Reddy	Telangana Rashtra Samithi	
73	Narayanpet	S.Rajender Reddy	Telangana Rashtra Samithi	
74	Mahbubnagar	V. Srinivas Goud	Telangana Rashtra Samithi	
75	Jadcherla	Charlakota Laxma Reddy	Telangana Rashtra Samithi	
76	Devarkadra	Alla Venkateshwar Reddy	Telangana Rashtra Samithi	
77	Makthal	Chittem Ram Mohan Reddy	Telangana Rashtra Samithi	
78	Wanaparthy	Singireddy Niranjan Reddy	Telangana Rashtra Samithi	
79	Gadwal	Bandla Krishna Mohan Reddy	Telangana Rashtra Samithi	
80	Alampur (SC)	V M Abraham	Telangana Rashtra Samithi	
81	Nagarkurnool	Marri Janardhan Reddy	Telangana Rashtra Samithi	
82	Achampet (SC)	Guvvala Balaraju	Telangana Rashtra Samithi	
83	Kalwakurthy	Gurka Jaipal Yadav	Telangana Rashtra Samithi	
84	Shadnagar	Anjaiah Yelganamoni	Telangana Rashtra Samithi	
85	Kollapur	Beeram Harshavardhan Reddy	Indian National Congress	Defected from INC to TRS
85	Kollapur	Beeram Harshavardhan Reddy	Telangana Rashtra Samithi	Defected from INC to TRS
Nalgonda District
86	Devarakonda	Ravindra Kumar Ramavath	Telangana Rashtra Samithi	
87	Nagarjuna Sagar	Nomula Narsimhaiah	Telangana Rashtra Samithi	
88	Miryalaguda	Nallamothu Bhaskar Rao	Telangana Rashtra Samithi	
89	Huzurnagar	N. Uttam Kumar Reddy	Indian National Congress	
90	Kodad	Bollam Mallaiah Yadav	Telangana Rashtra Samithi	
91	Suryapet	Guntakandla Jagadish Reddy	Telangana Rashtra Samithi	
92	Nalgonda	Kancharla Bhupal Reddy	Telangana Rashtra Samithi	
93	Munugode	Komatireddy Raj Gopal Reddy	Indian National Congress	Resigned on 3 August 2022
93	Munugode	Kusukuntla Prabhakar Reddy	Telangana Rashtra Samithi	Won in 2022 bypoll
94	Bhongir	Pailla Shekar Reddy	Telangana Rashtra Samithi	
95	Nakrekal (SC)	Chirumarthi Lingaiah	Indian National Congress	Defected from INC to TRS
95	Nakrekal (SC)	Chirumarthi Lingaiah	Telangana Rashtra Samithi	Defected from INC to TRS
96	Thungathurthi (SC)	Gadari Kishore Kumar	Telangana Rashtra Samithi	
97	Alair	Gongidi Sunitha	Telangana Rashtra Samithi	
Warangal District
98	Jangaon	Muthireddy Yadagiri Reddy	Telangana Rashtra Samithi	
99	Ghanpur(Station) (SC)	Thatikonda Rajaiah	Telangana Rashtra Samithi	
100	Palakurthi	Errabelli Dayakar Rao	Telangana Rashtra Samithi	
101	Dornakal	D S Redya Naik	Telangana Rashtra Samithi	
102	Mahabubabad(ST)	Banoth Shankar Nayak	Telangana Rashtra Samithi	
103	Narsampet	Peddi Sudarshan Reddy	Telangana Rashtra Samithi	
104	Parkal	Challa Dharma Reddy	Telangana Rashtra Samithi	
105	Warangal West	Dasyam Vinay Bhasker	Telangana Rashtra Samithi	
106	Warangal East	Narendar Nannapuneni	Telangana Rashtra Samithi	
107	Waradhanapet(SC)	Aroori Ramesh	Telangana Rashtra Samithi	
108	Bhupalpalle	Gandra Venkata Ramana Reddy	Telangana Rashtra Samithi	Defected from TRS to INC
108	Bhupalpalle	Gandra Venkata Ramana Reddy	Indian National Congress	Defected from TRS to INC
109	Mulug(ST)	Dansari Anasuya	Indian National Congress	
Khammam District
110	Pinapaka(ST)	Kantha Rao Rega	Indian National Congress	Defected from INC to TRS
110	Pinapaka(ST)	Kantha Rao Rega	Telangana Rashtra Samithi	Defected from INC to TRS
111	Yellandu (ST)	Haripriya Banoth	Indian National Congress	Defected from INC to TRS
111	Yellandu (ST)	Haripriya Banoth	Telangana Rashtra Samithi	Defected from INC to TRS
112	Khammam	Puvvada Ajay Kumar	Telangana Rashtra Samithi	
113	Palair	Kandala Upender Reddy	Indian National Congress	Defected from INC to TRS
113	Palair	Kandala Upender Reddy	Telangana Rashtra Samithi	Defected from INC to TRS
114	Madhira (SC)	Mallu Bhatti Vikramarka	Indian National Congress	
115	Wyra (ST)	Lavudya Ramulu	Independent	Joined TRS
115	Wyra (ST)	Lavudya Ramulu	Telangana Rashtra Samithi	Joined TRS
116	Sathupalli (SC)	Sandra Venkata Veeraiah	Telugu Desam Party	Defected from TDP to TRS
116	Sathupalli (SC)	Sandra Venkata Veeraiah	Telangana Rashtra Samithi	Defected from TDP to TRS
117	Kothagudem	Vanama Nageswar Rao	Indian National Congress	Defected from INC to TRS
117	Kothagudem	Vanama Nageswar Rao	Telangana Rashtra Samithi	Defected from INC to TRS
118	Aswaraopeta(ST)	Mecha Nageswara Rao	Telugu Desam Party	Defected from TDP to TRS
118	Aswaraopeta(ST)	Mecha Nageswara Rao	Telangana Rashtra Samithi	Defected from TDP to TRS
119	Bhadrachalam(ST)	Podem Veeraiah	Indian National Congress	
120	Nominated	Stephenson Elvis		

== See also ==
- 2018 Telangana Legislative Assembly Elections
- Telangana Legislative Assembly
- Telangana Rashtra Samiti
