= 3rd Telangana Assembly =

2023 legislature of Telangana, India

3rd Telangana Legislative Assembly
←	2nd Assembly
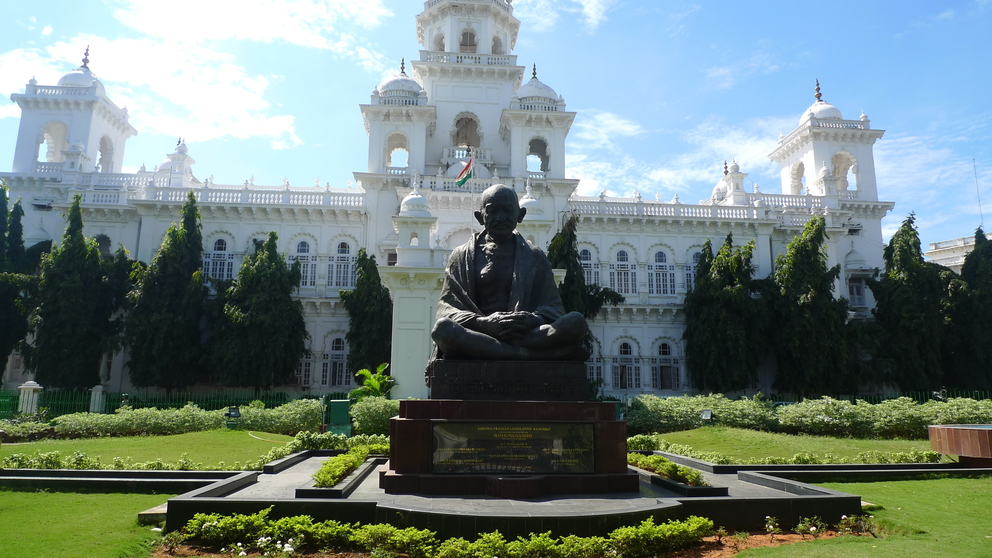
- Telangana Legislative Assembly Building

Overview
- Legislative body: Telangana Legislative Assembly
- Term: 7 December 2023 –
- Election: 2023 Telangana Legislative Assembly election
- Government: Indian National Congress
- Opposition: Official opposition (17): BRS (17); Other opposition (15): BJP (7); AIMIM (7); IND (1)
- Website: Telangana Legislative Assembly

Nominal Executive
- Governor: Jishnu Dev Varma

Telangana Legislative Assembly
- Members: 119
- Speaker: Gaddam Prasad Kumar (2023 – present)
- Chief Minister: Anumula Revanth Reddy; 7 December 2023
- Deputy Chief Minister: Bhatti Vikramarka Mallu (2023 – present)
- Leader of the House: Anumula Revanth Reddy
- Leader of the Opposition: K. Chandrashekar Rao, BRS
- Party control: Indian National Congress

The Third Legislative Assembly of Telangana was constituted after the 2023 Telangana Legislative Assembly elections which were concluded on 5 December 2023. Polling took place on 30 November 2023.

The majority needed to form the government is 60 seats in the assembly of 119 MLAs. The incumbent Congress crossed the majority of 60 seats needed in the assembly by winning a total of 64 seats.

== History ==
=== Election results ===
The results of the 2023 Telangana Legislative Assembly election were announced on 3 December 2023. The majority needed to form the government is 60 seats in the assembly of 119 MLAs.

== Notable members ==
S.No	Position	Portrait	Name	Party	Constituency	Office Taken
1	Speaker		Gaddam Prasad Kumar	Indian National Congress	Vikarabad (SC)	14 December 2023
2	Deputy Speaker		Jatoth Ram Chander Naik	Indian National Congress	Dornakal (ST)	8 June 2025
3	Leader of the House		Revanth Reddy (Chief Minister)	Indian National Congress	Kodangal	7 December 2023
4	Leader of Opposition		Kalvakuntla Chandrashekar Rao	Bharat Rashtra Samiti	Gajwel	9 December 2023

== Members ==
Source
District	No.	Constituency	Name	Party	Remarks
Kumuram Bheem Asifabad	1	Sirpur	Palvai Harish Babu	Bharatiya Janata Party	BJP Deputy Floor Leader
Mancherial	2	Chennur (SC)	Gaddam Vivek Venkatswamy	Indian National Congress	
Mancherial	3	Bellampalli (SC)	Gaddam Vinod	Indian National Congress	
Mancherial	4	Mancherial	Kokkirala Premsagar Rao	Indian National Congress	
Kumuram Bheem Asifabad	5	Asifabad (ST)	Kova Laxmi	Bharat Rashtra Samithi	
Nirmal	6	Khanapur (ST)	Vedma Bhojju	Indian National Congress	
Adilabad	7	Adilabad	Payal Shanker	Bharatiya Janata Party	
Adilabad	8	Boath (ST)	Anil Jadhav	Bharat Rashtra Samithi	
Nirmal	9	Nirmal	Alleti Maheshwar Reddy	Bharatiya Janata Party	BJP Floor Leader
Nirmal	10	Mudhole	Pawar Ramarao Patel	Bharatiya Janata Party	
Nizamabad	11	Armur	Paidi Rakesh Reddy	Bharatiya Janata Party	
Nizamabad	12	Bodhan	Podduturi Sudarshan Reddy	Indian National Congress	
Kamareddy	13	Jukkal (SC)	Thota Laxmi Kantha Rao	Indian National Congress	
Nizamabad	14	Banswada	Pocharam Srinivas Reddy	Bharat Rashtra Samithi	Defected BRS to join INC
Nizamabad	14	Banswada	Pocharam Srinivas Reddy	Indian National Congress	Defected BRS to join INC
Kamareddy	15	Yellareddy	K. Madan Mohan Rao	Indian National Congress	
Kamareddy	16	Kamareddy	K. V. Ramana Reddy	Bharatiya Janata Party	BJP Deputy Floor Leader
Nizamabad	17	Nizamabad Urban)	Dhanpal Suryanarayana Gupta	Bharatiya Janata Party	
Nizamabad	18	Nizamabad Rural	Rekulapally Bhoopathi Reddy	Indian National Congress	
Nizamabad	19	Balkonda	Vemula Prashanth Reddy	Bharat Rashtra Samithi	
Jagital	20	Koratla	Kalvakuntla Sanjay	Bharat Rashtra Samithi	
Jagital	21	Jagtial	M. Sanjay Kumar	Bharat Rashtra Samithi	Defected BRS to join INC
Jagital	21	Jagtial	M. Sanjay Kumar	Indian National Congress	Defected BRS to join INC
Jagital	22	Dharmapuri	Adluri Laxman Kumar	Indian National Congress	
Peddapalli	23	Ramagundam	Makkan Singh Raj Thakur	Indian National Congress	
Peddapalli	24	Manthani	Duddilla Sridhar Babu	Indian National Congress	Cabinet Minister
Peddapalli	25	Peddapalle	Chinthakunta Vijaya Ramana Rao	Indian National Congress	
Karimnagar	26	Karimnagar	Gangula Kamalakar	Bharat Rashtra Samithi	
Karimnagar	27	Choppadandi (SC)	Medipally Sathyam	Indian National Congress	
Rajanna Sircilla	28	Vemulawada	Aadi Srinivas	Indian National Congress	
Rajanna Sircilla	29	Sircilla	K. T. Rama Rao	Bharat Rashtra Samithi	
Karimnagar	30	Manakondur (SC)	Kavvampally Satyanarayana	Indian National Congress	
Karimnagar	31	Huzurabad	Padi Kaushik Reddy	Bharat Rashtra Samithi	
Siddipet	32	Husnabad	Ponnam Prabhakar	Indian National Congress	Cabinet Minister
Siddipet	33	Siddipet	T. Harish Rao	Bharat Rashtra Samithi	
Medak	34	Medak	Mynampally Rohith	Indian National Congress	
Sangareddy	35	Narayankhed	Patlolla Sanjeeva Reddy	Indian National Congress	
Sangareddy	36	Andole (SC)	Damodar Raja Narasimha	Indian National Congress	Cabinet Minister
Medak	37	Narsapur	Vakiti Sunitha Laxma Reddy	Bharat Rashtra Samithi	
Sangareddy	38	Zahirabad (SC)	Koninty Manik Rao	Bharat Rashtra Samithi	
Sangareddy	39	Sangareddy	Chinta Prabhakar	Bharat Rashtra Samithi	
Sangareddy	40	Patancheru	Gudem Mahipal Reddy	Bharat Rashtra Samithi	Defected BRS to join INC
Sangareddy	40	Patancheru	Gudem Mahipal Reddy	Indian National Congress	Defected BRS to join INC
Siddipet	41	Dubbak	Kotha Prabhakar Reddy	Bharat Rashtra Samithi	
Siddipet	42	Gajwel	K. Chandrashekar Rao	Bharat Rashtra Samithi	Leader of Opposition
Medchal Malkajgiri	43	Medchal	Malla Reddy	Bharat Rashtra Samithi	
Medchal Malkajgiri	44	Malkajgiri	Marri Rajasekhar Reddy	Bharat Rashtra Samithi	
Medchal Malkajgiri	45	Quthbullapur	K. P. Vivekanand Goud	Bharat Rashtra Samithi	
Medchal Malkajgiri	46	Kukatpally	Madhavaram Krishna Rao	Bharat Rashtra Samithi	
Medchal Malkajgiri	47	Uppal	Bandari Lakshma Reddy	Bharat Rashtra Samithi	
Ranga Reddy	48	Ibrahimpatnam	Malreddy Ranga Reddy	Indian National Congress	
Ranga Reddy	49	L. B. Nagar	Devireddy Sudheer Reddy	Bharat Rashtra Samithi	
Ranga Reddy	50	Maheshwaram	Sabitha Indra Reddy	Bharat Rashtra Samithi	
Ranga Reddy	51	Rajendranagar	T. Prakash Goud	Bharat Rashtra Samithi	Defected BRS to join INC
Ranga Reddy	51	Rajendranagar	T. Prakash Goud	Indian National Congress	Defected BRS to join INC
Ranga Reddy	52	Serilingampally	Arekapudi Gandhi	Bharat Rashtra Samithi	Defected BRS to join INC
Ranga Reddy	52	Serilingampally	Arekapudi Gandhi	Indian National Congress	Defected BRS to join INC
Ranga Reddy	53	Chevella (SC)	Kale Yadaiah	Bharat Rashtra Samithi	Defected BRS to join INC
Ranga Reddy	53	Chevella (SC)	Kale Yadaiah	Indian National Congress	Defected BRS to join INC
Vikarabad	54	Pargi	T. Ram Mohan Reddy	Indian National Congress	
Vikarabad	55	Vikarabad (SC)	Gaddam Prasad Kumar	Indian National Congress	
Vikarabad	56	Tandur	B. Manohar Reddy	Indian National Congress	
Hyderabad	57	Musheerabad	Muta Gopal	Bharat Rashtra Samithi	
Hyderabad	58	Malakpet	Ahmed Bin Abdullah Balala	All India Majlis-e-Ittehadul Muslimeen	
Hyderabad	59	Amberpet	Kaleru Venkatesh	Bharat Rashtra Samithi	
Hyderabad	60	Khairatabad	Danam Nagender	Bharat Rashtra Samithi	Defected BRS to join INC and disqualified by the High Court effective 23 April 2024
Hyderabad	60	Khairatabad	Danam Nagender	Indian National Congress	Defected BRS to join INC and disqualified by the High Court effective 23 April 2024
Hyderabad	60	Khairatabad	Vacant		Defected BRS to join INC and disqualified by the High Court effective 23 April 2024
Hyderabad	61	Jubilee Hills	Maganti Gopinath	Bharat Rashtra Samithi	Died on 08 June 2025
Hyderabad	61	Jubilee Hills	Vallala Naveen Yadav	Indian National Congress	Won By-election
Hyderabad	62	Sanathnagar	Talasani Srinivas Yadav	Bharat Rashtra Samithi	
Hyderabad	63	Nampally	Mohammad Majid Hussain	All India Majlis-e-Ittehadul Muslimeen	
Hyderabad	64	Karwan	Kausar Mohiuddin	All India Majlis-e-Ittehadul Muslimeen	
Hyderabad	65	Goshamahal	T. Raja Singh	Bharatiya Janata Party	
Hyderabad	65	Goshamahal	T. Raja Singh	Independent	Resigned from BJP in 2025
Hyderabad	66	Charminar	Mir Zulfeqar Ali	All India Majlis-e-Ittehadul Muslimeen	
Hyderabad	67	Chandrayangutta	Akbaruddin Owaisi	All India Majlis-e-Ittehadul Muslimeen	AIMIM Floor Leader
Hyderabad	68	Yakutpura	Jaffer Hussain	All India Majlis-e-Ittehadul Muslimeen	
Hyderabad	69	Bahadurpura	Mohammed Mubeen	All India Majlis-e-Ittehadul Muslimeen	
Hyderabad	70	Secunderabad	T. Padma Rao Goud	Bharat Rashtra Samithi	
Hyderabad	71	Secunderabad Cantt. (SC)	G. Lasya Nanditha	Bharat Rashtra Samithi	Died on 23 February 2024
Hyderabad	71	Secunderabad Cantt. (SC)	Narayanan Sri Ganesh	Indian National Congress	Won By-election
Vikarabad	72	Kodangal	Anumula Revanth Reddy	Indian National Congress	Chief Minister of Telangana
Narayanpet	73	Narayanpet	Chittem Parnika Reddy	Indian National Congress	
Mahabubnagar	74	Mahbubnagar	Yennam Srinivas Reddy	Indian National Congress	
Mahabubnagar	75	Jadcherla	Janampalli Anirudh Reddy	Indian National Congress	
Mahabubnagar	76	Devarkadra	Gavinolla Madhusudan Reddy	Indian National Congress	
Narayanpet	77	Makthal	Vakiti Srihari	Indian National Congress	
Wanaparthy	78	Wanaparthy	Tudi Megha Reddy	Indian National Congress	
Jogulamba Gadwal	79	Gadwal	Bandla Krishna Mohan Reddy	Bharat Rashtra Samithi	
Jogulamba Gadwal	80	Alampur (SC)	Vijayudu	Bharat Rashtra Samithi	
Nagarkurnool	81	Nagarkurnool	Kuchkulla Rajesh Reddy	Indian National Congress	
Nagarkurnool	82	Achampet (SC)	Chikkudu Vamshi Krishna	Indian National Congress	
Ranga Reddy	83	Kalwakurthy	Kasireddy Narayan Reddy	Indian National Congress	
Ranga Reddy	84	Shadnagar	K. Shankaraiah	Indian National Congress	
Nagarkurnool	85	Kollapur	Jupally Krishna Rao	Indian National Congress	Cabinet Minister
Nalgonda	86	Devarakonda (ST)	Nenavath Balu Naik	Indian National Congress	
Nalgonda	87	Nagarjuna Sagar	Kunduru Jayaveer Reddy	Indian National Congress	
Nalgonda	88	Miryalaguda	Bathula Laxma Reddy	Indian National Congress	
Suryapet	89	Huzurnagar	Nalamada Uttam Kumar Reddy	Indian National Congress	Cabinet Minister
Suryapet	90	Kodad	Nalamada Padmavathi Reddy	Indian National Congress	
Suryapet	91	Suryapet	Guntakandla Jagadish Reddy	Bharat Rashtra Samithi	
Nalgonda	92	Nalgonda	Komatireddy Venkat Reddy	Indian National Congress	Cabinet Minister
Nalgonda	93	Munugode	Komatireddy Raj Gopal Reddy	Indian National Congress	
Yadadri Bhuvanagiri	94	Bhongir	Kumbam Anil Kumar Reddy	Indian National Congress	
Nalgonda	95	Nakrekal (SC)	Vemula Veeresham	Indian National Congress	
Suryapet	96	Thungathurthi (SC)	Mandula Samuel	Indian National Congress	
Yadadri Bhuvanagiri	97	Alair	Beerla Ilaiah	Indian National Congress	
Jangoan	98	Jangaon	Palla Rajeshwar Reddy	Bharat Rashtra Samithi	
Jangoan	99	Ghanpur (Station) (SC)	Kadiyam Srihari	Bharat Rashtra Samithi	Defected BRS to join INC
Jangoan	99	Ghanpur (Station) (SC)	Kadiyam Srihari	Indian National Congress	Defected BRS to join INC
Jangoan	100	Palakurthi	Mamidala Yashaswini Reddy	Indian National Congress	
Mahabubabad	101	Dornakal (ST)	Jatoth Ram Chander Naik	Indian National Congress	
Mahabubabad	102	Mahabubabad (ST)	Murali Naik Bhukya	Indian National Congress	
Warangal Rural	103	Narsampet	Donthi Madhava Reddy	Indian National Congress	
Warangal Rural	104	Parkal	Revuri Prakash Reddy	Indian National Congress	
Warangal Rural	105	Warangal West	Naini Rajender Reddy	Indian National Congress	
Warangal Rural	106	Warangal East	Konda Surekha	Indian National Congress	Cabinet Minister
Warangal Rural	107	Waradhanapet (SC)	K. R. Nagaraj	Indian National Congress	
Jayashankar Bhupalpalle	108	Bhupalpalle	Gandra Satyanarayana Rao	Indian National Congress	
Mulug	109	Mulug (ST)	Dansari Anasuya (Seethakka)	Indian National Congress	Cabinet Minister
Bhadradri Kothagudem	110	Pinapaka (ST)	Payam Venkateswarlu	Indian National Congress	
Bhadradri Kothagudem	111	Yellandu (ST)	Koram Kanakaiah	Indian National Congress	
Khammam	112	Khammam	Thummala Nageswara Rao	Indian National Congress	Cabinet Minister
Khammam	113	Palair	Ponguleti Srinivasa Reddy	Indian National Congress	Cabinet Minister
Khammam	114	Madhira (SC)	Mallu Bhatti Vikramarka	Indian National Congress	Deputy Chief Minister Of Telangana.
Khammam	115	Wyra (ST)	Maloth Ramdas	Indian National Congress	
Khammam	116	Sathupalli (SC)	Matta Ragamayee	Indian National Congress	
Bhadradri Kothagudem	117	Kothagudem	Kunamneni Sambasiva Rao	Communist Party of India	
Bhadradri Kothagudem	118	Aswaraopeta (ST)	Jare Adinarayana	Indian National Congress	
Bhadradri Kothagudem	119	Bhadrachalam (ST)	Tellam Venkata Rao	Bharat Rashtra Samithi	Defected BRS to join INC
Bhadradri Kothagudem	119	Bhadrachalam (ST)	Tellam Venkata Rao	Indian National Congress	Defected BRS to join INC

== See also ==
- 2nd Telangana Legislative Assembly
