= 2023 Telangana Legislative Assembly election =

Telangana Legislative Assembly election held in November, 2023

- 30 November 2023

All 119 seats in the Telangana Legislative Assembly 60 seats needed for a majority
- Opinion polls
- Registered: 32,618,257
- Turnout: 23,474,306 (71.97%) ▼1.77%
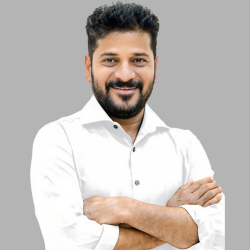

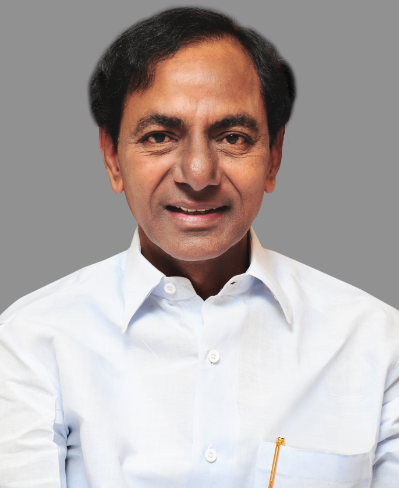

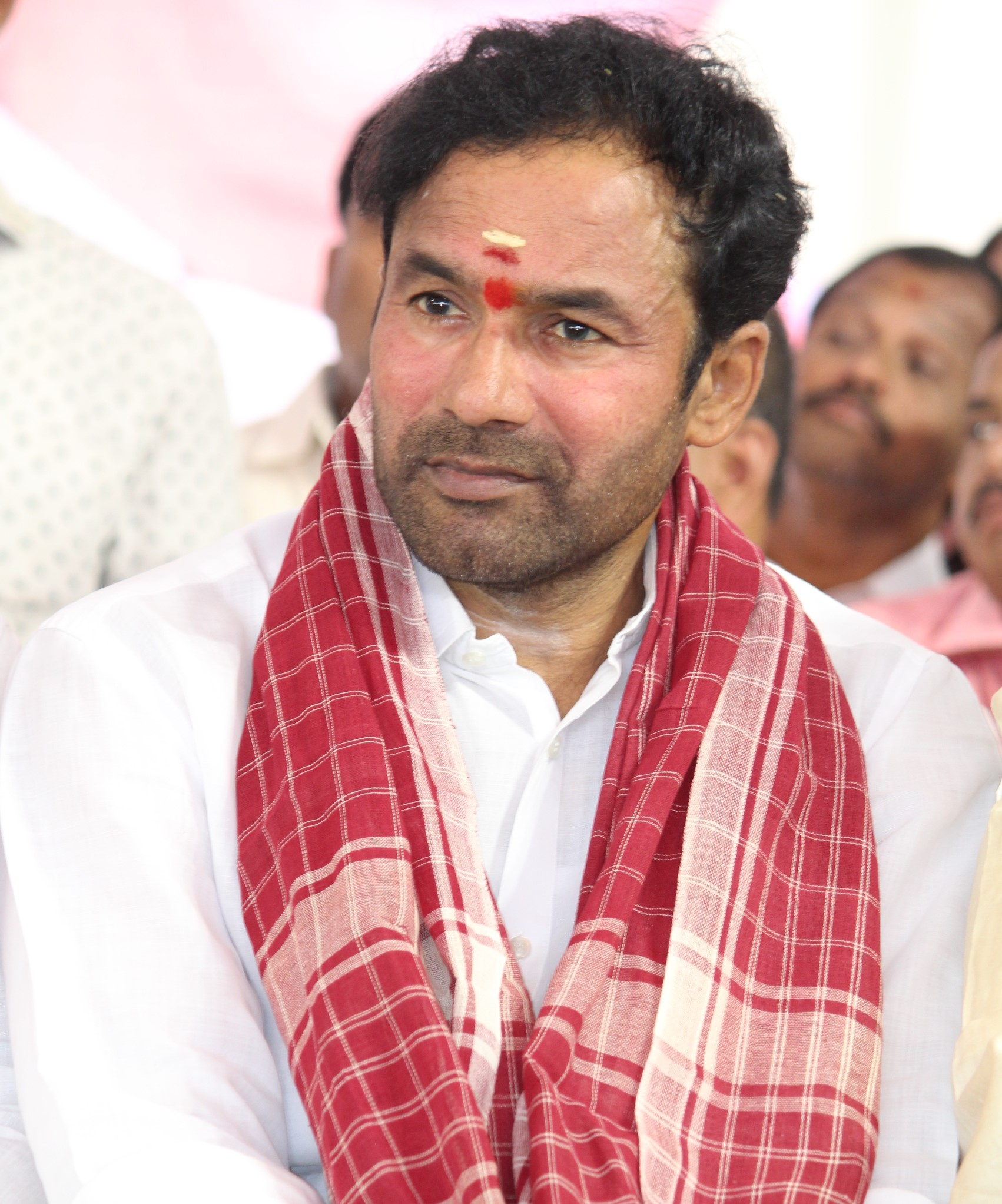

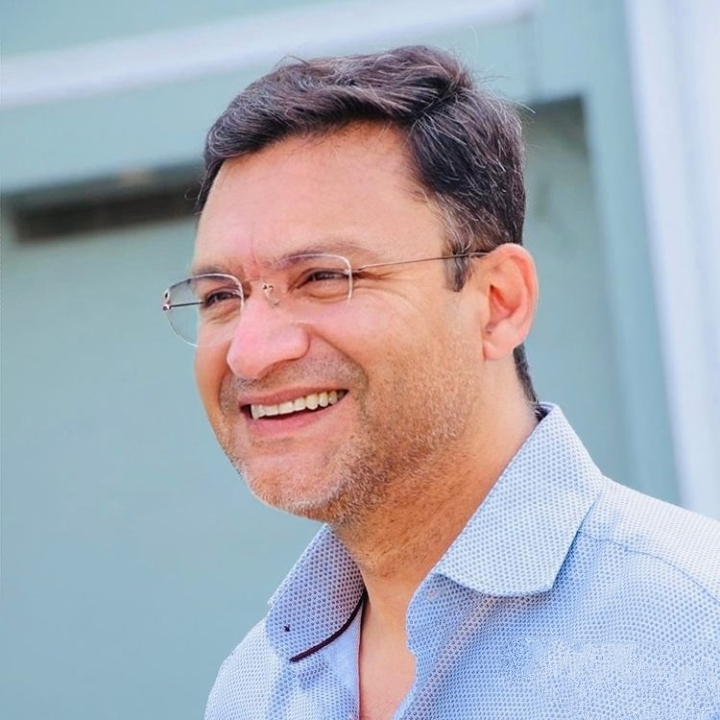
	Majority party	Minority party
Leader	Anumula Revanth Reddy	K. Chandrashekar Rao
Party	INC	BRS
Leader since	2021	2001
Leader's seat	Kodangal (won), Kamareddy (lost)	Gajwel (won), Kamareddy (lost)
Last election	19 seats, 28.43%	88 seats, 46.87%
Seats won	64	39
Seat change	▲45	▼49
Popular vote	9,235,833	8,753,956
Percentage	39.40%	37.35%
Swing	▲10.97 pp	▼10.52 pp
	Third party	Fourth party
Leader	G. Kishan Reddy	Akbaruddin Owaisi
Party	BJP	AIMIM
Leader since	2023	1999
Leader's seat	Did not contest (Note: Reddy was the sitting MP for Secunderabad)	Chandrayangutta (won)
Last election	1 seat, 6.98%	7 seats, 2.70%
Seats won	8	7
Seat change	▲7	No change
Popular vote	3,257,528	519,379
Percentage	13.90%	2.92%
Swing	▲6.92 pp	▼0.09 pp

- Structure of the Telangana Legislative Assembly after the election
Chief Minister before election
K. Chandrasekhar Rao
BRS
Chief Minister after election
A. Revanth Reddy
INC

The 2023 Telangana Legislative Assembly election was held on 30 November 2023 to elect all 119 members of Telangana Legislative Assembly for its third term. The votes were counted and the results were declared on 3 December 2023.

The Indian National Congress (INC) along with its ally Communist Party of India (CPI) won a majority with 65 seats against the incumbent Bharat Rashtra Samithi (BRS)'s 39 seats. With a victory for the first time after the formation of Telangana, it strengthened the INC's position in southern India following its recent success in Karnataka. The BRS and the outgoing chief minister K. Chandrashekar Rao suffered a major loss in the elections by losing in one of his contended seats after being in power for two terms.

== Background ==
The tenure of Telangana Legislative Assembly was scheduled to end on 16 January 2024. The previous assembly elections were held in December 2018 and the incumbent Telangana Rashtra Samithi, which was later renamed as Bharat Rashtra Samithi, formed the state government, with K. Chandrashekar Rao becoming the Chief Minister for the second time.

== Schedule ==
The election schedule was announced by the Election Commission of India on 9 October 2023.

Poll event	Date
Notification date	3 November 2023
Start of nomination	3 November 2023
Last date for filing nomination	10 November 2023
Scrutiny of nomination	13 November 2023
Last date for withdrawal of nomination	15 November 2023
Date of poll	30 November 2023
Date of counting of votes	3 December 2023

== Election statistics ==
There are 15,871,493 male voters and 15,843,339 female voters while the number of transgender voters stood at 2,557. 2,202,168 voters were deleted across the state.

A total of 2,290 candidates were in the fray, while 608 withdrew their nominations. The highest number of candidates in the electoral contest is from the L. B. Nagar constituency, with 48 candidates, and the least from Banswada and Narayanpet constituencies, each with 7 candidates.

The Election Commission of India seized a total of ₹659.2 crore worth of cash and goods across the state, which were alleged to be used by contesting candidates to influence voters in the elections and conduct general electoral malpractice, in violation of the Model Code of Conduct.

== Parties and alliances ==
Seat distribution of INC+

Seat distribution of NDA

The Indian National Congress fought the elections in alliance with the Communist Party of India, whereas the Bharatiya Janata Party fought alongside the Janasena Party. The Telangana outfit of the Telugu Desam Party did not contest.

Alliance/party		Flag	Symbol	Leader	Seats contested	
Bharat Rashtra Samithi				K. Chandrashekhar Rao	119	
INC+	Indian National Congress			Revanth Reddy	118	119
INC+	Communist Party of India			Kunamneni Sambasiva Rao	1	119
NDA	Bharatiya Janata Party			G. Kishan Reddy	111	119
NDA	Janasena Party			N. Shankar Goud	8	119
All India Majlis-e-Ittehadul Muslimeen				Akbaruddin Owaisi	9	
Bahujan Samaj Party		BSP Flag	BSP elephant	R. S. Praveen Kumar	107	
Communist Party of India (Marxist)				Tammineni Veerabhadram	19	

== Candidates ==
District	Constituency		BRS		INC+		NDA	
District	#	Name	Party	Candidate	Party	Candidate	Party	Candidate
Komaram Bheem Asifabad	1	Sirpur	BRS	Koneru Konappa	INC	Raavi Srinivas	BJP	Palvai Harish Babu
Mancherial	2	Chennur (SC)	BRS	Balka Suman	INC	G. Vivekanand	BJP	Durgam Ashok
Mancherial	3	Bellampalli (SC)	BRS	Durgam Chinnaiah	INC	Gaddam Vinod	BJP	A. Sridevi
Mancherial	4	Mancherial	BRS	Nadipelli Divakar Rao	INC	Kokkirala Premsagar Rao	BJP	Verabelli Raghunath
Komaram Bheem Asifabad	5	Asifabad (ST)	BRS	Kova Laxmi	INC	Ajmera Shyam	BJP	Ajmeera Athmaram Naik
Adilabad	6	Khanapur (ST)	BRS	Bhukya Johnson Rathod Naik	INC	Vedma Bhojju	BJP	Ramesh Rathod
Adilabad	7	Adilabad	BRS	Jogu Ramanna	INC	Kandi Srinivas Reddy	BJP	Payal Shanker
Adilabad	8	Boath (ST)	BRS	Anil Jadhav	INC	Ade Gajender	BJP	Soyam Bapu Rao
Nirmal	9	Nirmal	BRS	Allola Indrakaran Reddy	INC	Kuchadi Srihari Rao	BJP	Alleti Maheshwar Reddy
Nirmal	10	Mudhole	BRS	Gaddigari Vittal Reddy	INC	Bhosle Narayan Rao Patil	BJP	Rama Rao Pawar
Nizamabad	11	Armoor	BRS	Ashannagari Jeevan Reddy	INC	Prodduturi Vinay Kumar Reddy	BJP	Paidi Rakesh Reddy
Nizamabad	12	Bodhan	BRS	Mohammed Shakeel Aamir	INC	P. Sudarshan Reddy	BJP	Vaddi Mohan Reddy
Kamareddy	13	Jukkal (SC)	BRS	Hanmanth Shinde	INC	Thota Lakshmi Kantha Rao	BJP	T. Aruna Tara
Kamareddy	14	Banswada	BRS	Pocharam Srinivas Reddy	INC	Eanugu Ravinder	BJP	Endela Lakshminarayana
Nizamabad	15	Yellareddy	BRS	Jajala Surender	INC	K. Madan Mohan Rao	BJP	Vaddepally Subhash Reddy
Kamareddy	16	Kamareddy	BRS	K. Chandrashekhar Rao	INC	Anumula Revanth Reddy	BJP	K. V. Ramana Reddy
Nizamabad	17	Nizamabad Urban	BRS	Bigala Ganesh Gupta	INC	Mohammed Ali Shabbir	BJP	Dhanpal Suryanarayana Gupta
Nizamabad	18	Nizamabad Rural	BRS	Bajireddy Goverdhan	INC	Rekulapally Bhoopathi Reddy	BJP	Dinesh Kulachari
Nizamabad	19	Balkonda	BRS	Vemula Prashanth Reddy	INC	Sunil Kumar Muthyala	BJP	Aleti Annapurna
Jagtial	20	Koratla	BRS	Kalvakuntla Sanjay	INC	Juvvadi Narasinga Rao	BJP	Dharmapuri Arvind
Jagtial	21	Jagtial	BRS	M. Sanjay Kumar	INC	T. Jeevan Reddy	BJP	Boga Sravani
Jagtial	22	Dharmapuri (SC)	BRS	Koppula Eshwar	INC	Adluri Laxman Rao	BJP	Sogala Kumar
Peddapalli	23	Ramagundam	BRS	Korukanti Chander	INC	Makkan Singh Raj Thakur	BJP	Kandula Sandhya Rani
Peddapalli	24	Manthani	BRS	Putta Madhu	INC	D. Sridhar Babu	BJP	Chandupatla Sunil Reddy
Peddapalli	25	Peddapalli	BRS	Dasari Manohar Reddy	INC	Chintakunta Vijaya Ramana Rao	BJP	Dugyala Pradeep Rao
Karimnagar	26	Karimnagar	BRS	Gangula Kamalakar	INC	Purumalla Srinivas	BJP	Bandi Sanjay Kumar
Karimnagar	27	Choppadandi (SC)	BRS	Sunke Ravi Shankar	INC	Medipally Satyam	BJP	Bodiga Shobha
Rajanna Sircilla	28	Vemulawada	BRS	Chalmeda Lakshmi Narasimha Rao	INC	Aadi Srinivas	BJP	Chennamaneni Vikas Rao
Rajanna Sircilla	29	Sircilla	BRS	K. T. Rama Rao	INC	K. K. Mahender Reddy	BJP	Rani Rudrama Reddy
Karimnagar	30	Manakondur (SC)	BRS	Erupula Rasamayi Balakishan	INC	Kavvampally Satyanarayana	BJP	Arepally Mohan
Karimnagar	31	Huzurabad	BRS	Padi Kaushik Reddy	INC	Vodithala Pranav	BJP	Etela Rajender
Karimnagar	32	Husnabad	BRS	Vodithela Sathish Kumar	INC	Ponnam Prabhakar	BJP	Bomma Sriram Chakravarthy
Siddipet	33	Siddipet	BRS	T. Harish Rao	INC	Poojala Harikrishna	BJP	Doodi Srikanth Reddy
Medak	34	Medak	BRS	M. Padma Devender Reddy	INC	Mynampally Rohit Rao	BJP	Panja Vijay Kumar
Sangareddy	35	Narayankhed	BRS	Mahareddy Bhupal Reddy	INC	Patlolla Sanjeeva Reddy	BJP	Jenawade Sangappa
Sangareddy	36	Andole (SC)	BRS	Chanti Kranthi Kiran	INC	C. Damodar Raja Narasimha	BJP	Babu Mohan
Medak	37	Narsapur	BRS	Vakiti Sunitha Laxma Reddy	INC	Aavalu Raji Reddy	BJP	Erragolla Murali Yadav
Sangareddy	38	Zahirabad (SC)	BRS	Koninty Manik Rao	INC	Agam Chandra Sekhar	BJP	Ramchandra Raja Narasimha
Sangareddy	39	Sangareddy	BRS	Chinta Prabhakar	INC	Jagga Reddy	BJP	Pulimamidi Raju
Sangareddy	40	Patancheru	BRS	Gudem Mahipal Reddy	INC	Kata Srinivas Goud	BJP	T. Nandhishwar Goud
Siddipet	41	Dubbak	BRS	Kotha Prabhakar Reddy	INC	Cheruku Srinivas Reddy	BJP	Raghunandan Rao
Siddipet	42	Gajwel	BRS	K. Chandrashekhar Rao	INC	Tumkunta Narsa Reddy	BJP	Etela Rajender
Medchal-Malkajgiri	43	Medchal	BRS	Chamakura Malla Reddy	INC	Thotakura Vajresh Yadav	BJP	Yenugu Sudharshan Reddy
Medchal-Malkajgiri	44	Malkajgiri	BRS	Marri Rajasekhar Reddy	INC	Mynampally Hanumantha Rao	BJP	N. Ramchander Rao
Medchal-Malkajgiri	45	Quthbullapur	BRS	K. P. Vivekanand Goud	INC	Kolan Hanmanth Reddy	BJP	Kuna Srisailam Goud
Medchal-Malkajgiri	46	Kukatpally	BRS	Madhavaram Krishna Rao	INC	Bandi Ramesh	JSP	Mummareddy Prem Kumar
Medchal-Malkajgiri	47	Uppal	BRS	Bandari Lakshma Reddy	INC	M. Parmeshwar Reddy	BJP	N. V. S. S. Prabhakar
Ranga Reddy	48	Ibrahimpatnam	BRS	Manchireddy Kishan Reddy	INC	Malreddy Ranga Reddy	BJP	Nomula Dayanand Goud
Ranga Reddy	49	L. B. Nagar	BRS	Devireddy Sudheer Reddy	INC	Madhu Yaskhi Goud	BJP	Sama Ranga Reddy
Ranga Reddy	50	Maheshwaram	BRS	Sabitha Indra Reddy	INC	Kichannagiri Laxma Reddy	BJP	Andela Sriramulu Yadav
Ranga Reddy	51	Rajendranagar	BRS	T. Prakash Goud	INC	Kasturi Narendar	BJP	Tokala Srinivas Reddy
Ranga Reddy	52	Serilingampally	BRS	Arekapudi Gandhi	INC	V. Jagadeeshwar Goud	BJP	Ravi Kumar Yadav
Ranga Reddy	53	Chevella (SC)	BRS	Kale Yadaiah	INC	Pamena Bheembharat	BJP	K. S. Ratnam
Vikarabad	54	Pargi	BRS	K. Mahesh Reddy	INC	T. Ram Mohan Reddy	BJP	Booneti Maruthi Kiran
Vikarabad	55	Vikrabad (SC)	BRS	Methuku Anand	INC	Gaddam Prasad Kumar	BJP	Peddinti Naveen Kumar
Vikarabad	56	Tandur	BRS	Pilot Rohith Reddy	INC	Buyyani Manohar Reddy	JSP	Nemuri Shankar Goud
Hyderabad	57	Musheerabad	BRS	Muta Gopal	INC	Anjan Kumar Yadav	BJP	Poosa Raju
Hyderabad	58	Malakpet	BRS	Teegala Ajith Reddy	INC	Shaikh Akbar	BJP	Samreddy Surender Reddy
Hyderabad	59	Amberpet	BRS	K. Venkatesh	INC	Rohin Reddy	BJP	Krishna Yadav
Hyderabad	60	Khairatabad	BRS	Danam Nagender	INC	P. Vijaya Reddy	BJP	Chintala Ramachandra Reddy
Hyderabad	61	Jubilee Hills	BRS	Maganti Gopinath	INC	Mohammed Azharuddin	BJP	Lankala Deepak Reddy
Hyderabad	62	Sanathnagar	BRS	Talasani Srinivas Yadav	INC	Kota Neelima	BJP	Marri Shashidhar Reddy
Hyderabad	63	Nampally	BRS	Anand Kumar Goud	INC	Mohammed Feroz Khan	BJP	Rahul Chandra
Hyderabad	64	Karwan	BRS	Aindala Krishnaiah	INC	Osman Bin Mohammed Al Hajiri	BJP	Amar Singh
Hyderabad	65	Goshamahal	BRS	Nand Kishore Vyas	INC	Mogili Sunitha	BJP	T. Raja Singh
Hyderabad	66	Charminar	BRS	Ibrahim Lodi	INC	Mohammed Mujeebulla Shareef	BJP	Megha Rani
Hyderabad	67	Chandrayangutta	BRS	M. Sitharam Reddy	INC	Boya Nagesh	BJP	K. Mahendra
Hyderabad	68	Yakutpura	BRS	Sama Sunder Reddy	INC	K. Ravi Raju	BJP	Veerendra Yadav
Hyderabad	69	Bahadurpura	BRS	Ali Baqri	INC	Rajesh Kumar Pulipati	BJP	Y. Naresh Kumar
Hyderabad	70	Secunderabad	BRS	T. Padma Rao Goud	INC	Adam Santosh Kumar	BJP	Mekala Sarangapani
Hyderabad	71	Secunderabad Cantt. (SC)	BRS	G. Lasya Nanditha	INC	G. V. Vennela	BJP	Ganesh Narayan
Vikarabad	72	Kodangal	BRS	Patnam Narendra Reddy	INC	Anumula Revanth Reddy	BJP	Bantu Ramesh Kumar
Narayanpet	73	Narayanpet	BRS	S. Rajender Reddy	INC	Chittem Parnika Reddy	BJP	K. Rathang Pandu Reddy
Mahabubnagar	74	Mahbubnagar	BRS	V. Srinivas Goud	INC	Yennam Srinivas Reddy	BJP	A. P. Mithun Kumar Reddy
Mahabubnagar	75	Jadcherla	BRS	C. Laxma Reddy	INC	J. Anirudh Reddy	BJP	Chittaranjan Das
Mahabubnagar	76	Devarkadra	BRS	Alla Venkateshwar Reddy	INC	Gavinolla Madhusudan Reddy	BJP	Konda Prashant Reddy
Narayanpet	77	Makthal	BRS	Chittem Rammohan Reddy	INC	Vakiti Srihari	BJP	Jalandhar Reddy
Wanaparthy	78	Wanaparthy	BRS	Singireddy Niranjan Reddy	INC	Tudi Megha Reddy	BJP	Anugna Reddy
Jogulamba Gadwal	79	Gadwal	BRS	Bandla Krishna Mohan Reddy	INC	Saritha Thirupathaiah	BJP	Boya Shiva
Jogulamba Gadwal	80	Alampur (SC)	BRS	Vijayudu	INC	S. A. Sampath Kumar	BJP	Perumallu Rajgopal
Nagarkunool	81	Nagarkurnool	BRS	Marri Janardhan Reddy	INC	Kuchkulla Rajesh Reddy	JSP	Vanga Lakshman Goud
Nagarkunool	82	Achampet (SC)	BRS	Guvvala Balaraju	INC	Chikkudu Vamshi Krishna	BJP	Devani Sathish Madiga
Ranga Reddy	83	Kalwakurthy	BRS	Gurka Jaipal Yadav	INC	Kasireddy Narayan Reddy	BJP	Talloju Achary
Ranga Reddy	84	Shadnagar	BRS	Anjaiah Yadav Yelganamoni	INC	K. Shankaraiah	BJP	Ande Babaiah
Nagarkunool	85	Kollapur	BRS	Beeram Harshavardhan Reddy	INC	Jupally Krishna Rao	BJP	Aelleni Sudhakar Rao
Nalgonda	86	Devarakonda (ST)	BRS	Ravindra Kumar Ramavath	INC	Nenavath Balu Naik	BJP	Kethavath Lalu Naik
Nalgonda	87	Nagarjuna Sagar	BRS	Nomula Bhagath Yadav	INC	Kunduru Jayaveer	BJP	Kankanala Niveditha Reddy
Nalgonda	88	Miryalaguda	BRS	Nallamothu Bhaskar Rao	INC	Bathula Laxma Reddy	BJP	Sadineni Srinivas
Suryapet	89	Huzurnagar	BRS	Shanampudi Saidireddy	INC	Nalamada Uttam Kumar Reddy	BJP	Challa Srilatha Reddy
Suryapet	90	Kodad	BRS	Bollam Mallaiah Yadav	INC	Nalamada Padmavathi Reddy	JSP	Mekkala Sathish Reddy
Suryapet	91	Suryapet	BRS	Guntakandla Jagadish Reddy	INC	Ramreddy Damodar Reddy	BJP	Sankineni Venkateswara Rao
Nalgonda	92	Nalgonda	BRS	Kancharla Bhupal Reddy	INC	Komatireddy Venkat Reddy	BJP	Madagani Srinivas Goud
Nalgonda	93	Munugode	BRS	Kusukuntla Prabhakar Reddy	INC	Komatireddy Raj Gopal Reddy	BJP	Chalamalla Krishna Reddy
Yadadri Bhuvanagiri	94	Bhongir	BRS	Pailla Shekar Reddy	INC	Kumbam Anil Kumar Reddy	BJP	Gudur Narayana Reddy
Nalgonda	95	Nakrekal (SC)	BRS	Chirumarthi Lingaiah	INC	Vemula Veeresham	BJP	Nakarakanti Mogulaiah
Suryapet	96	Thungathurthi (SC)	BRS	Gadari Kishore	INC	Mandula Samual	BJP	Kadiyam Ramachandraiah
Yadadri Bhuvanagiri	97	Alair	BRS	Gongidi Sunitha	INC	Beerla Ilaiah	BJP	Padala Srinivas
Jangoan	98	Jangaon	BRS	Palla Rajeshwar Reddy	INC	Kommuri Pratap Reddy	BJP	Arutla Dashmanth Reddy
Jangoan	99	Ghanpur Station (SC)	BRS	Kadiyam Srihari	INC	Singhapuram Indira	BJP	Gunde Vijayarama Rao
Jangoan	100	Palakurthi	BRS	Errabelli Dayakar Rao	INC	Yeshashwani Memidila	BJP	Lega Rammohan Reddy
Mahabubabad	101	Dornakal (ST)	BRS	D. S. Redya Naik	INC	Jatoth Ram Chander Naik	BJP	Bhukya Sangeetha
Mahabubabad	102	Mahabubabad (ST)	BRS	Banoth Shankar Nayak	INC	Murali Naik	BJP	Jathoth Hussain Naik
Warangal	103	Narsampet	BRS	Peddi Sudarshan Reddy	INC	Donthi Madhava Reddy	BJP	K. Pulla Rao
Warangal	104	Parkal	BRS	Challa Dharma Reddy	INC	Revuri Prakash Reddy	BJP	P. Kali Prasad Rao
Hanamkonda	105	Warangal West	BRS	Dasyam Vinay Bhasker	INC	Naini Rajender Reddy	BJP	Rao Padma
Hanamkonda	106	Warangal East	BRS	Nannapuneni Narendar	INC	Konda Surekha	BJP	Errabelli Pradeep Rao
Hanamkonda	107	Waradhanapet (SC)	BRS	Aroori Ramesh	INC	K. R. Naga Raju	BJP	Kondeti Sridhar
Jayashankar Bhupalpalle	108	Bhupalpalle	BRS	Gandra Venkata Ramana Reddy	INC	Gandra Satyanarayana Rao	BJP	Chandupatla Keerthi Reddy
Mulugu	109	Mulug (ST)	BRS	Bade Nagajyothi	INC	Seethakka	BJP	Azmeera Prahlad Naik
Bhadradri Kothagudem	110	Pinapaka (ST)	BRS	Rega Kantha Rao	INC	Payam Venkateswarlu	BJP	Podiyam Balaraju
Bhadradri Kothagudem	111	Yellandu (ST)	BRS	Haripriya Banoth	INC	Koram Kanakaiah	BJP	Dharavath Ravinder Naik
Khammam	112	Khammam	BRS	Puvvada Ajay Kumar	INC	Thummala Nageswara Rao	JSP	Miryala Ramakrishna
Khammam	113	Palair	BRS	Kandala Upender Reddy	INC	Ponguleti Srinivas Reddy	BJP	Nunna Ravikumar
Khammam	114	Madhira (SC)	BRS	Kamal Raju Lingala	INC	Mallu Bhatti Vikramarka	BJP	Perumarpally Vijaya Raju
Khammam	115	Wyra (ST)	BRS	Banoth Madanlal	INC	Ramdas Maloth	JSP	Tejavath Sampath Nayak
Khammam	116	Sathupalli (SC)	BRS	Sandra Venkata Veeraiah	INC	Matta Ragamayee	BJP	Ramalingeshwar Rao
Bhadradri Kothagudem	117	Kothagudem	BRS	Vanama Venkateshwara Rao	CPI	Kunamneni Sambasiva Rao	JSP	Lakkineni Surendar Rao
Bhadradri Kothagudem	118	Aswaraopeta (ST)	BRS	Mecha Nageswara Rao	INC	Jare Adinarayana	JSP	M. Umadevi
Bhadradri Kothagudem	119	Bhadrachalam (ST)	BRS	Dr. Tellam Venkata Rao	INC	Podem Veeraiah	BJP	Kunja Dharma Rao

== Issues ==
=== Kaleshwaram project ===
INC leader Rahul Gandhi called the Kaleshwaram Lift Irrigation Project, the flagship scheme of the Bharat Rashtra Samithi government in Telangana, the "ATM of KCR's family". He made those remarks after visiting the Medigadda Barrage, which had come under scrutiny of the National Dam Safety Authority after six piers in its seventh block showed signs of damage and leakage.

=== Dharani portal ===
The Dharani Portal, an Integrated land records system launched by the incumbent BRS government as part of its land reform scheme, to aid farmers in the distribution of the Rythu Bandhu scheme, has been contested by opposition parties, who alleged that it was created with the purpose of grabbing the land of poor farmers. The BJP chief, J. P. Nadda, vowed that the portal would be abolished if the BJP came to power, while the INC promised that they would replace the existing portal with an improved version called 'Bhu Bharati'.

== Incidents ==
=== Assassination attempt ===
On 30 October 2023, an unidentified man stabbed Kotha Prabhakar Reddy, Member of Parliament for Medak, in the stomach while posing as if to shake hands with him during a campaign in Siddipet district. He was apprehended by others in the crowd and put into police custody.

=== Other ===
On 16 November 2023, a person, carrying two bullets, was arrested at a public meeting in Narsapur. Incumbent Chief Minister of Telangana, K. Chandrashekar Rao was in attendance.

== Campaigns ==
=== Bharat Rashtra Samithi ===
Bharat Rashtra Samithi president and Chief Minister K. Chandrashekar Rao launched the party campaign at an election meeting in Husnabad on 15 October 2023, where he announced the party manifesto.

==== Manifesto ====
Bharat Rashtra Samithi (BRS) president and Chief Minister K. Chandrashekar Rao released his party's manifesto on 15 October 2023.

Social security pension: Pensions currently stands at ₹2,016, will be increased to ₹3,016 in the first year after the BRS returns to power, and then be raised incrementally up to ₹5,000 in the next four years.

Rythu Bandhu scheme: Rythu Bandhu scheme in which farmers get ₹10,000 per annum per acre, the payments will be enhanced gradually to ₹16,000 per annum over the next five years.

Gas cylinder: After returning to power BRS will give each gas cylinder at ₹400 to 'eligible beneficiaries' and the remaining cost will be borne by the state government.

Arogya Sri health scheme: ₹1,500,000 health insurance cover to all eligible beneficiaries under the 'Arogya Sri' health scheme, increasing it from the present ₹500,000.

Housing: House sites would be provided to the poor who have no house in the state. The current housing policy will continue.

Rice distribution: Distribute of fine rice through Fair Price shops soon after the party comes to power.

=== Indian National Congress ===
Former President and General Secretary of the Congress Party, Rahul Gandhi and Priyanka Gandhi launched the Congress campaign at Mulugu on 18 October 2023. The bus yatra lasted three days and covered eight constituencies.

Subsequently, on 30 October 2023 and 3 November 2023, Telangana Jana Samithi and YSR Telangana Party respectively announced that they would not contest state elections and instead support the Congress.

==== Manifesto ====
Former Congress president Sonia Gandhi unveiled the party's six guarantees at a rally in Tukkuguda on 17 September 2023.

Agriculture: Farmers and agricultural labourers will receive ₹15,000 and ₹12,000 in financial assistance each year. Bonus of ₹500 per quintal for paddy above minimum support price.

Electricity: 200 free electrical units to all households under the Gruha Jyothi scheme.

Housing: Under the Indiramma Idlu scheme, a piece of land and ₹500,000 for the construction of a house will be provided to the homeless poor. 250 sq. yards plot for families of martyrs of the Telangana movement.

Seniors: ₹4,000 monthly pension for the elderly, widows and others as well as and ₹1,000,000 worth Rajiv Arogyasri insurance cover for poor under the Cheyutha scheme.

Women: Under the Mahalakshmi scheme, women shall receive ₹2,500 every month in financial assistance, gas cylinders for ₹500, and free travel in RTC buses.

Old pension scheme: Reimplementation of the Old Pension Scheme, which it did in Rajasthan, Chhattisgarh, Himachal Pradesh and Karnataka.

Youth: Vidya Bharosa Card worth ₹500,000 to students for pursuing higher education and establishment of Telangana International School in every mandal (block).

=== Bharatiya Janata Party ===
Bharatiya Janata Party leader Amit Shah launched the BJP's campaign at a public meeting in Adilabad on 10 October 2023.

==== Manifesto ====
Union Home Minister Amit Shah unveiled the BJP Telangana's manifesto for Telangana Assembly elections in the name of "Sakala Janula Saubhagya Telangana" on 18 November 2023 in Hyderabad.

Gas cylinder: The beneficiaries of the Ujjwala Yojana will be given four gas cylinders per year for free.

Uniform Civil Code (UCC): Once the Bharatiya Janata Party forms government in Telangana, it will, within 6 months, bring the Uniform Civil Code (UCC) in the State.

Hyderabad Liberation Day: Hyderabad Liberation Day (September 17) and the Razakar Vibhishika Smriti Divas (August 27) will "be celebrated officially by the Government".

Zero tolerance against corruption: Investigate all the cases of corruption through a system headed by the retired Supreme Court judge. It will appoint committee headed by a retired Supreme Court judge to go into alleged corruption by BRS government.

Education & employment: Those pursuing degree or professional courses will be given free laptops for college girl students, 10 lakh jobs for women, party will ensure that employment is provided to 2.5 youth in the next five years in the state.

Reservation: Abolish unconstitutional religion-based reservations

Aada Bidda Bharosa: Fixed deposit scheme for a girl child at her birth, under which ₹200,000 can be redeemed when she turns 21.

== Surveys and polls ==
=== Opinion polls ===
Seat share
Polling agency	Date published	Sample size	Margin of error					Majority
Polling agency	Date published	Sample size	Margin of error	BRS	INC	BJP	Others	Majority
ABP News-CVoter	9 October 2023	11,928	±3—5%	43-55	48-60	5-11	5-11	Hung
ABP News-CVoter	4 November 2023	9,631	±3—5%	49-61	43-55	5-11	4-10	Hung

Vote share
Polling agency	Date published	Sample size	Margin of error					Lead
Polling agency	Date published	Sample size	Margin of error	BRS	INC	BJP	Others	Lead
ABP News-CVoter	9 October 2023	11,928	±3—5%	38%	39%	16.3%	7.4%	1%
ABP News-CVoter	4 November 2023	9,631	±3—5%	40.5%	39.4%	14.3%	5.8%	1.1%

=== Exit polls ===
Exit polls were released on 30 November 2023.

Polling agency					Majority
Polling agency	BRS	INC+	NDA	Others	Majority
Republic TV-Matrize	46-56	58-68	4-9	5-7	Hung
Jan Ki Baat	40-55	48-64	7-13	4-7	Hung
India TV-CNX	31-47	63-79	2-4	5-7	INC
ABP News-CVoter	38-54	49-65	5-13	5-9	Hung
News 24-Today's Chanakya	24-42	62-80	2-12	5-11	INC
TV9 Bharatvarsh-Polstrat	48-58	49-59	5-10	6-8	Hung
Times Now-ETG	37-45	60-70	6-8	5-7	INC
India Today-Axis My India	34-44	63-73	4-8	5-8	INC
NDTV Poll of Polls	44	62	7	6	INC
Actual results	39	65	8	7	INC

== Results ==
The Congress with its ally, the CPI got a clear majority by winning 65 seats. It defeated the incumbent BRS which secured 39 seats. BJP won eight and AIMIM retained its seven seats in the Greater Hyderabad region. The Janasena Party (JSP), which contested in eight seats as a partner of Bharatiya Janata Party, lost all of them. Bahujan Samaj Party (BSP) and Communist Party of India (Marxist) (CPI(M)) lost in all the contested seats. The vote share of AIMIM is comparatively less due to less voter turnout in their seats.

=== Vote share and seat share ===
Vote share by party
1. Indian National Congress (39.4%)
2. Bharat Rashtra Samithi (37.4%)
3. Bharatiya Janata Party (13.9%)
4. All India Majlis-e-Ittehadul Muslimeen (2.22%)
5. None of the Above (0.73%)
6. Others (6.40%)
Seat share by Party
1. Indian National Congress (53.8%)
2. Bharat Rashtra Samithi (32.8%)
3. Bharatiya Janata Party (6.72%)
4. All India Majlis-e-Ittehadul Muslimeen (5.88%)
5. Communist Party of India (0.84%)

Source
Alliance/party		Popular vote			Seats		
Alliance/party		Votes	%	±pp	Contested	Won	+/−
INC+	Indian National Congress	9,235,833	39.40	▲10.97	118	64	▲45
INC+	Communist Party of India	80,336	0.34	▼0.06	1	1	▲1
INC+	Total	9,316,169	39.74	▲10.91	119	65	▲46
Bharat Rashtra Samithi		8,753,956	37.35	▼9.52	119	39	▼49
NDA	Bharatiya Janata Party	3,257,528	13.90	▲6.92	111	8	▲7
NDA	Janasena Party	59,001	0.25	▲0.25	8	0	Steady
NDA	Total	3,316,529	14.15	▲7.17	119	8	▲7
All India Majlis-e-Ittehadul Muslimeen		519,379	2.22	▼0.49	9	7	Steady
Other parties		848,086	3.62	▼6.65	933	0	▼3
Independents		513,873	2.19	▼1.06	991	0	▼1
NOTA		171,953	0.73	▼0.36			
Total		23,439,945	100.00	N/A	2290	119	N/A
Vote statistics
Valid votes							
Invalid votes							
Votes cast/Turnout		2,34,74,306	71.97				
Abstentions							
Registered voters		3,26,18,257					

Telangana PCC president Revanth Reddy was widely credited with the success of his party in the polls. Congress state in-charge Masoor Khan stated that Rahul Gandhi's Bharat Jodo Yatra worked in favour in the Congress in Telangana. The Congress' landslide victory in neighbouring Karnataka a few months earlier was also emphasised as a major boost for the Congress in the state. Congress party poll strategist Sunil Kanugolu was also highlighted in the media for his efforts.

According to an analysis in The Hindu, strong anti-incumbency generated due to the failure to fill government jobs, the arrogant attitude of the Chief Minister, discrepancies in the cash transfer and welfare schemes, general corruption, voter fatigue, land grabbing charges faced by 30-40 BRS MLAs, and Chandrasekhar Rao's “bold” and early decision of fielding most of the BRS MLAs, including those with a dubious track record helped the Congress in winning the election.

=== Results by region ===
Out of the total of 25 seats in the Greater Hyderabad region, BRS won 16, followed by AIMIM with 7. INC and BJP secured one seat each. The INC's victory was on account of its performance in north and south Telangana.

Out of the total of 51 seats in the North Telangana region, congress won 33, followed by BRS with 10. BJP secured 7 seats in this region. The INC's victory was on account of its performance in north and south Telangana. AIMIM only contested in Greater Hyderabad.

Out of the total of 43 seats in the South Telangana region, congress won 30, followed by BRS with 13. BJP did not win any seat in this region. The INC's victory was on account of its performance in north and south Telangana. AIMIM only contested in Greater Hyderabad.

Region	Seats								
Region	Seats	INC+		BRS		NDA		AIMIM	
Region	Seats	Seats	Vote (%)	Seats	Vote (%)	Seats	Vote (%)	Seats	Vote (%)
Hyderabad	25	1	25.53	16	38.97	1	20.92	7	19.79
North	51	33	41.26	10	34.64	7	15.66	Did not contest	
South	43	30	45.86	13	39.29	0	7.69	Did not contest	
Total	119	64	39.74	39	37.35	8	14.15	7	2.22

=== Results by district ===
District	Seats				
District	Seats	INC	BRS	BJP	MIM
K. B. Asifabad	2	—N/a	1	1	—N/a
Mancherial	3	3	—N/a	—N/a	—N/a
Adilabad	3	1	1	1	—N/a
Nirmal	2	—N/a	—N/a	2	—N/a
Nizamabad	6	3	1	2	—N/a
Kamareddy	3	1	1	1	—N/a
Jagtial	3	1	2	—N/a	—N/a
Peddapalli	3	3	—N/a	—N/a	—N/a
Karimnagar	5	3	2	—N/a	—N/a
Rajanna Sircilla	2	1	1	—N/a	—N/a
Siddipet	3	—N/a	3	—N/a	—N/a
Medak	2	1	1	—N/a	—N/a
Sangareddy	5	2	3	—N/a	—N/a
Medchal-Malkajgiri	5	—N/a	5	—N/a	—N/a
Ranga Reddy	8	3	5	—N/a	—N/a
Vikarabad	4	4	—N/a	—N/a	—N/a
Hyderabad	15	—N/a	7	1	7
Narayanpet	2	2	—N/a	—N/a	—N/a
Mahabubnagar	3	3	—N/a	—N/a	—N/a
Wanaparthy	1	1	—N/a	—N/a	—N/a
Jogulamba Gadwal	2	—N/a	2	—N/a	—N/a
Nagarkurnool	3	3	—N/a	—N/a	—N/a
Nalgonda	6	6	—N/a	—N/a	—N/a
Suryapet	4	3	1	—N/a	—N/a
Yadadri Bhuvanagiri	2	2	—N/a	—N/a	—N/a
Jangaon	3	1	2	—N/a	—N/a
Mahabubabad	2	2	—N/a	—N/a	—N/a
Warangal	2	2	—N/a	—N/a	—N/a
Hanamkonda	3	3	—N/a	—N/a	—N/a
Jayashankar Bhupalpalle	1	1	—N/a	—N/a	—N/a
Mulugu	1	1	—N/a	—N/a	—N/a
Bhadradri Kothagudem	5	4	1	—N/a	—N/a
Khammam	5	5	—N/a	—N/a	—N/a
Total	119	65	39	8	7

=== Region wise results ===
Region	Seats					
Region	Seats	INC	BRS	BJP	MIM	OTH
Northern Telangana	49	30	11	7	—N/a	1
Greater Hyderabad	39	10	21	1	7	—N/a
Southern Telangana	31	24	7	—N/a	—N/a	—N/a
Total	119	64	39	8	7	1

=== Results by constituency ===
District	Constituency		Winner				Runner up				Margin	
District	No.	Name	Candidate	Party	Votes	%	Candidate	Party	Votes	%	Margin	
Asifabad	1	Sirpur	Palvai Harish Babu	BJP	63,702	34.09	Koneru Konappa	BRS	60,614	32.43	Margin	3,088
Mancherial	2	Chennur (SC)	Gaddam Vivekanand	INC	87,541	57.51	Balka Suman	BRS	50,026	32.86	37,515	
Mancherial	3	Bellampalli (SC)	Gaddam Vinod	INC	82,217	57.96	Durgam Chinnaiah	BRS	45,339	31.96	36,878	
Mancherial	4	Mancherial	Kokkirala Premsagar Rao	INC	1,05,945	55.03	Verabelli Raghunath	BJP	39,829	20.69	66,116	
Asifabad	5	Asifabad (ST)	Kova Laxmi	BRS	83,036	44.97	Ajmera Shyam	INC	60,238	32.62	22,798	
Adilabad	6	Khanapur (ST)	Vedma Bhojju	INC	58,870	33.79	Johnson Naik Bhukya	BRS	54,168	31.09	4,702	
Adilabad	7	Adilabad	Payal Shanker	BJP	67,608	35.84	Jogu Ramanna	BRS	60,916	32.29	6,692	
Adilabad	8	Boath (ST)	Anil Jadhav	BRS	76,792	44.13	Soyam Bapu Rao	BJP	53,992	31.03	22,800	
Nirmal	9	Nirmal	Alleti Maheshwar Reddy	BJP	1,06,400	54.03	Allola Indrakaran Reddy	BRS	55,697	28.28	50,703	
Nirmal	10	Mudhole	Rama Rao Pawar	BJP	98,252	48.59	Gaddigari Vittal Reddy	BRS	74,254	36.72	23,999	
Nizamabad	11	Armur	Paidi Rakesh Reddy	BJP	72,658	44.90	Prodduturi Vinay Kumar Reddy	INC	42,989	26.56	29,669	
Nizamabad	12	Bodhan	P. Sudarshan Reddy	INC	66,963	38.95	Mohammed Shakil Aamir	BRS	63,901	37.17	3,062	
Kamareddy	13	Jukkal (SC)	Thota Laxmi Kantha Rao	INC	64,489	39.19	Hanmant Shinde	BRS	63,337	38.49	1,152	
Kamareddy	14	Banswada	Pocharam Srinivas Reddy	BRS	76,278	47.65	Eanugu Ravinder Reddy	INC	52,814	32.99	23,464	
Nizamabad	15	Yellareddy	K. Madan Mohan Rao	INC	86,989	47.07	Jajala Surendar	BRS	62,988	34.08	24,001	
Kamareddy	16	Kamareddy	K. V. Ramana Reddy	BJP	66,652	34.55	K. Chandrashekar Rao	BRS	59,911	31.06	6,741	
Nizamabad	17	Nizamabad Urban	Dhanpal Suryanarayana Gupta	BJP	75,240	40.82	Mohammed Ali Shabbir	INC	59,853	32.47	15,387	
Nizamabad	18	Nizamabad Rural	Rekulapally Bhoopathi Reddy	INC	78,378	40.19	Bajireddy Goverdhan	BRS	56,415	28.93	21,963	
Nizamabad	19	Balkonda	Vemula Prashanth Reddy	BRS	70,417	40.28	Muthyala Sunil Kumar	INC	65,884	37.68	4,533	
Jagtial	20	Korutla	Kalvakuntla Sanjay	BRS	72,115	39.28	Dharmapuri Arvind	BJP	61,810	33.67	10,305	
Jagtial	21	Jagtial	M. Sanjay Kumar	BRS	70,243	39.83	T. Jeevan Reddy	INC	54,421	30.86	15,822	
Jagtial	22	Dharmapuri (SC)	Adluri Laxman Kumar	INC	91,393	50.30	Koppula Eshwar	BRS	69,354	38.17	22,039	
Peddapalli	23	Ramagundam	Makkan Singh Raj Thakur	INC	92,227	60.28	Korukanti Chandar Patel	BRS	35,433	23.16	56,794	
Peddapalli	24	Manthani	Duddilla Sridhar Babu	INC	1,03,822	52.82	Putta Madhukar	BRS	72,442	36.86	31,380	
Peddapalli	25	Peddapalli	Chinthakunta Vijaya Ramana Rao	INC	1,18,888	57.17	Dasari Manohar Reddy	BRS	63,780	30.67	55,108	
Karimnagar	26	Karimnagar	Gangula Kamalakar	BRS	92,179	40.12	Bandi Sanjay Kumar	BJP	89,016	38.74	3,163	
Karimnagar	27	Choppadandi (SC)	Medipally Satyam	INC	90,395	49.62	Sunke Ravi Shankar	BRS	52,956	29.07	37,439	
Rajanna Sircilla	28	Vemulawada	Aadi Srinivas	INC	71,451	41.03	Chalimeda Lakshmi Narasimha Rao	BRS	56,870	32.66	14,581	
Rajanna Sircilla	29	Sircilla	K. T. Rama Rao	BRS	89,244	47.28	K. K. Mahender Reddy	INC	59,557	31.56	29,687	
Karimnagar	30	Manakondur (SC)	Kavvampally Satyanarayana	INC	96,773	52.08	Erupula Balakishan	BRS	64,408	34.66	32,365	
Karimnagar	31	Huzurabad	Padi Kaushik Reddy	BRS	80,333	38.38	Etela Rajender	BJP	63,460	30.32	16,873	
Karimnagar	32	Husnabad (SC)	Ponnam Prabhakar	INC	1,00,955	48.84	Voditela Satish Kumar	BRS	81,611	39.48	19,344	
Siddipet	33	Siddipet	Thanneeru Harish Rao	BRS	1,05,514	58.17	Pujala Hari Krishna	INC	23,206	12.79	82,308	
Medak	34	Medak	Mynampally Rohith	INC	87,126	46.63	Padma Devender Reddy	BRS	76,969	41.19	10,157	
Sangareddy	35	Narayankhed	Patlolla Sanjeeva Reddy	INC	91,373	47.09	Mahareddy Bhupal Reddy	BRS	84,826	43.72	6,547	
Sangareddy	36	Andole (SC)	C. Damodar Raja Narasimha	INC	1,14,147	53.65	Chanti Karanthi Kiran	BRS	85,954	40.40	28,193	
Medak	37	Narsapur	Vakiti Sunitha Laxma Reddy	BRS	88,410	44.64	Aavula Raji Reddy	INC	79,555	40.17	8,855	
Sangareddy	38	Zahirabad (SC)	Koninty Manik Rao	BRS	97,205	46.49	A. Chandrasekhar Rao	INC	84,415	40.37	12,790	
Sangareddy	39	Sangareddy	Chinta Prabhakar	BRS	83,112	44.32	Jagga Reddy	INC	74,895	39.94	8,217	
Sangareddy	40	Patancheru	Gudem Mahipal Reddy	BRS	1,05,387	38.06	Kata Srinivas Goud	INC	98,296	35.50	7,091	
Siddipet	41	Dubbak	Kotha Prabhakar Reddy	BRS	97,879	56.01	Raghunandan Rao	BJP	44,366	25.39	53,513	
Siddipet	42	Gajwel	K Chandrashekar Rao	BRS	1,11,684	48.05	Etela Rajender	BJP	66,653	28.68	45,031	
Medchal-Malkajgiri	43	Medchal	Chamakura Malla Reddy	BRS	1,86,017	46.44	Thotakura Vajresh Yadav	INC	1,52,598	38.10	33,419	
Medchal-Malkajgiri	44	Malkajgiri	Marri Rajasekhar Reddy	BRS	1,25,049	47.12	Mynampally Hanumanth Rao	INC	75,519	28.45	49,530	
Medchal-Malkajgiri	45	Quthbullapur	K. P. Vivekanand	BRS	1,87,999	46.80	Kuna Srisailam Goud	BJP	1,02,423	25.50	85,576	
Medchal-Malkajgiri	46	Kukatpally	Madhavaram Krishna Rao	BRS	1,35,636	54.08	Bandi Ramesh	INC	65,248	26.02	70,387	
Medchal-Malkajgiri	47	Uppal	Bandari Lakshma Reddy	BRS	1,32,927	48.33	Mandumula Parameshwar Reddy	INC	83,897	30.51	49,030	
Ranga Reddy	48	Ibrahimpatnam	Malreddy Ranga Reddy	INC	1,26,506	50.92	Manchireddy Kishan Reddy	BRS	89,806	36.14	36,700	
Ranga Reddy	49	L. B. Nagar	Devireddy Sudheer Reddy	BRS	1,11,380	37.74	Sama Ranga Reddy	BJP	89,075	30.18	22,305	
Ranga Reddy	50	Maheshwaram	Sabitha Indra Reddy	BRS	1,25,578	40.99	Andela Sriramulu Yadav	BJP	99,391	32.45	26,187	
Ranga Reddy	51	Rajendranagar	T. Prakash Goud	BRS	1,21,734	37.09	Thokala Srinivas Reddy	BJP	89,638	27.31	32,096	
Ranga Reddy	52	Serilingampally	Arekapudi Gandhi	BRS	1,57,332	43.97	Jagadeeswar Goud	INC	1,10,780	30.96	46,552	
Ranga Reddy	53	Chevella (SC)	Kale Yadaiah	BRS	76,218	38.73	Beem Bharath Pamena	INC	75,950	38.59	268	
Vikarabad	54	Pargi	Tammannagari Ram Mohan Reddy	INC	98,536	48.93	K. Mahesh Reddy	BRS	74,523	37.01	24,013	
Vikarabad	55	Vicarabad (SC)	Gaddam Prasad Kumar	INC	86,885	49.85	Methuku Anand	BRS	73,992	42.46	12,893	
Vikarabad	56	Tandur	B. Manohar Reddy	INC	84,662	48.32	Pilot Rohith Reddy	BRS	78,079	44.56	6,583	
Hyderabad	57	Musheerabad	Muta Gopal	BRS	75,207	49.07	Anjan Kumar Yadav	INC	37,410	24.41	37,797	
Hyderabad	58	Malakpet	Ahmed Bin Abdullah Balala	AIMIM	55,805	42.27	Shaik Akbar	INC	29,699	22.50	26,106	
Hyderabad	59	Amberpet	Kaleru Venkatesh	BRS	74,416	50.80	Chenaboyanna Krishna Yadav	BJP	49,879	34.05	24,537	
Hyderabad	60	Khairatabad	Danam Nagender	BRS	67,368	43.48	P. Vijaya Reddy	INC	45,358	29.28	22,010	
Hyderabad	61	Jubilee Hills	Maganti Gopinath	BRS	80,549	43.94	Mohammed Azharuddin	INC	64,212	35.03	16,337	
Hyderabad	62	Sanathnagar	Talasani Srinivas Yadav	BRS	72,557	56.57	Marri Shashidhar Reddy	BJP	30,730	23.96	41,827	
Hyderabad	63	Nampally	Mohammad Majid Hussain	AIMIM	62,185	40.83	Mohammed Feroz Khan	INC	60,148	39.49	2,037	
Hyderabad	64	Karwan	Kausar Mohiuddin	AIMIM	83,388	47.42	Amar Singh	BJP	41,402	23.55	41,986	
Hyderabad	65	Goshamahal	T. Raja Singh	BJP	80,182	54.08	Nand Kishore Vyas	BRS	58,725	39.61	21,457	
Hyderabad	66	Charminar	Mir Zulfeqar Ali	AIMIM	49,103	50.05	Megha Rani Agarwal	BJP	26,250	26.76	22,853	
Hyderabad	67	Chandrayangutta	Akbaruddin Owaisi	AIMIM	99,776	64.89	Muppi Seetharam Reddy	BRS	18,116	11.78	81,660	
Hyderabad	68	Yakutpura	Jaffer Hussain	AIMIM	46,153	32.86	Amjed Ullah Khan	MBT	45,275	32.24	878	
Hyderabad	69	Bahadurpura	Mohammed Mubeen	AIMIM	89,451	62.24	Mir Inayath Ali Baqri	BRS	22,426	15.60	67,025	
Hyderabad	70	Secunderabad	T. Padma Rao Goud	BRS	78,223	55.42	Adam Santosh Kumar	INC	32,983	23.37	45,240	
Hyderabad	71	Secunderabad Cantt. (SC)	G. Lasya Nanditha	BRS	59,057	47.43	Sri Ganesh Narayan	BJP	41,888	33.64	17,169	
Vikarabad	72	Kodangal	Anumula Revanth Reddy	INC	1,07,429	55.05	Patnam Narender Reddy	BRS	74,897	38.38	32,532	
Narayanpet	73	Narayanpet	Chittem Parnika Reddy	INC	84,708	46.31	S. Rajender Reddy	BRS	76,757	41.97	7,951	
Mahabubnagar	74	Mahbubnagar	Yennam Srinivas Reddy	INC	87,227	48.04	V. Srinivas Goud	BRS	64, 489	37.72	18,738	
Mahabubnagar	75	Jadcherla	Janampalli Anirudh Reddy	INC	90,865	50.30	Charlakola Laxma Rreddy	BRS	75,694	41.90	15,171	
Mahabubnagar	76	Devarkadra	Gavinolla Madhusudan Reddy	INC	88,551	45.31	Alla Venkateswar Reddy	BRS	87,159	44.60	1,392	
Narayanpet	77	Makthal	Vakiti Srihari	INC	74,917	39.88	Chittem Ram Mohan Reddy	BRS	57,392	30.55	17,525	
Wanaparthy	78	Wanaparthy	Tudi Megha Reddy	INC	1,07,115	50.25	Singireddy Niranjan Reddy	BRS	81,795	38.37	25,320	
Jogulamba Gadwal	79	Gadwal	Bandla Krishna Mohan Reddy	BRS	94,097	43.79	Saritha Thirupathaiah	INC	87,061	40.52	7,036	
Jogulamba Gadwal	80	Alampur (SC)	Vijayudu	BRS	1,04,060	52.88	S. A. Sampath Kumar	INC	73,487	37.34	30,573	
Nagarkunool	81	Nagarkurnool	Kuchkulla Rajesh Reddy	INC	87,161	47.21	Marri Janardhan Reddy	BRS	81,913	44.37	5,248	
Nagarkunool	82	Achampet (SC)	Chikkudu Vamshi Krishna	INC	1,15,337	58.96	Guvvala Balaraju	BRS	66,011	33.74	49,326	
Ranga Reddy	83	Kalwakurthy	Kasireddy Narayan Reddy	INC	75,858	37.41	Talloju Achary	BJP	70,448	34.75	5,410	
Ranga Reddy	84	Shadnagar	K. Shankaraiah	INC	77,817	39.79	Yelganamoni Anjaiah	BRS	70,689	36.15	7,128	
Nagarkunool	85	Kollapur	Jupally Krishna Rao	INC	93,609	48.70	Beeram Harshavardhan Reddy	BRS	63,678	33.13	29,931	
Nalgonda	86	Devarakonda (ST)	Nenavath Balu Naik	INC	1,11,344	52.06	Ravindra Kumar Ramavath	BRS	81,323	38.02	30,021	
Nalgonda	87	Nagarjuna Sagar	Kunduru Jayaveer Reddy	INC	1,19,831	59.30	Nomula Bhagath Kumar	BRS	63,982	31.66	55,849	
Nalgonda	88	Miryalaguda	Bathula Laxma Reddy	INC	1,14,462	59.08	Nallamothu Bhaskar Rao	BRS	65,680	33.90	48,782	
Suryapet	89	Huzurnagar	Nalamada Uttam Kumar Reddy	INC	1,16,707	54.21	Shanampudi Saidi Reddy	BRS	71,819	33.36	44,888	
Suryapet	90	Kodad	Nalamada Padmavathi Reddy	INC	1,25,783	60.19	Bollam Mallaiah Yadav	BRS	67,611	32.35	58,172	
Suryapet	91	Suryapet	Guntakandla Jagadish Reddy	BRS	75,143	36.36	Damodar Reddy Ramreddy	INC	70,537	34.13	4,606	
Nalgonda	92	Nalgonda	Komatireddy Venkat Reddy	INC	1,07,405	52.64	Kancharla. Bhupal Reddy	BRS	53,073	26.01	54,332	
Nalgonda	93	Munugode	Komatireddy Raj Gopal Reddy	INC	1,19,624	51.21	Kusukuntla Prabhakar Reddy	BRS	79,034	33.83	40,590	
Yadadri Bhuvanagiri	94	Bhongir	Kumbam Anil Kumar Reddy	INC	1,02,742	52.40	Pailla Shekar Reddy	BRS	76,541	39.04	26,201	
Nalgonda	95	Nakrekal (SC)	Vemula Veeresham	INC	1,33,540	60.97	Chirumarthy Lingaiah	BRS	64,701	29.54	68,839	
Suryapet	96	Thungathurthi (SC)	Mandula Samuel	INC	1,29,535	57.53	Gadari Kishore	BRS	78,441	34.84	51,094	
Yadadri Bhuvanagiri	97	Alair	Beerla Ilaiah	INC	1,22,140	57.41	Gongidi Sunitha	BRS	72,504	34.08	49,636	
Jangoan	98	Jangaon	Palla Rajeshwar Reddy	BRS	98,975	48.61	Kommuri Pratap Reddy	INC	83,192	40.86	15,783	
Jangoan	99	Ghanpur Station (SC)	Kadiyam Srihari	BRS	1,01,696	47.13	Singhapuram Indira	INC	93,917	43.53	7,779	
Jangoan	100	Palakurthi	Mamidala Yashaswini Reddy	INC	1,26,848	57.62	Errabelli Dayakar Rao	BRS	79,214	35.98	47,634	
Mahabubabad	101	Dornakal (ST)	Jatoth Ram Chander Naik	INC	1,15,587	60.01	Dharamsoth Redya Naik	BRS	62,456	32.42	53,131	
Mahabubabad	102	Mahabubabad (ST)	Murali Naik Bhukya	INC	1,16,644	55.46	Banoth Shankar Naik	BRS	66,473	31.6	50,171	
Warangal	103	Narsampet	Donthi Madhava Reddy	INC	1,04,185	50.73	Peddi Sudarshan Reddy	BRS	85,296	41.53	18,889	
Warangal	104	Parkal	Revuri Prakash Reddy	INC	72,573	38.46	Challa. Dharma Reddy.	BRS	64,632	34.25	7,941	
Hanamkonda	105	Warangal West	Naini Rajender Reddy	INC	72,649	43.50	Dasyam Vinay Bhasker	BRS	57,318	34.32	15,331	
Hanamkonda	106	Warangal East	Konda Surekha	INC	67,757	39.47	Errabelli Pradeep Kumar Rao	BJP	52,105	30.35	15,652	
Hanamkonda	107	Waradhanapet (SC)	K. R. Nagaraj	INC	1,06,696	48.77	Aroori Ramesh	BRS	87,238	39.88	19,458	
Jayashankar Bhupalpalle	108	Bhupalpalle	Gandra Satyanarayana Rao	INC	1,23,116	54.55	Gandra Venkata Ramana Reddy	BRS	70,417	31.20	52,699	
Mulugu	109	Mulug (ST)	Seethakka	INC	1,02,267	54.52	Bade Nagajyothi	BRS	68,567	36.55	33,700	
Bhadradri Kothagudem	110	Pinapaka (ST)	Payam Venkateswarlu	INC	90,510	56.61	Rega Kantha Rao	BRS	56,004	35.03	34,506	
Bhadradri Kothagudem	111	Yellandu (ST)	Koram Kanakaiah	INC	1,09,171	61.22	Banoth Hari Priya	BRS	51,862	29.08	57,309	
Khammam	112	Khammam	Tummala Nageswara Rao	INC	1,36,016	57.58	Puvvada Ajay Kumar	BRS	86,635	36.67	49,381	
Khammam	113	Palair	Ponguleti Srinivasa Reddy	INC	1,27,820	58.94	Kandala Upender Reddy	BRS	71,170	32.82	56,650	
Khammam	114	Madhira (SC)	Mallu Bhatti Vikramarka	INC	1,08,970	55.49	Lingala Kamal Raju	BRS	73,518	37.44	35,452	
Khammam	115	Wyra (ST)	Ramdas Maloth	INC	93,913	55.44	Banoth Madanlal	BRS	60,868	35.93	33,045	
Khammam	116	Sathupalli (SC)	Matta Ragamayee	INC	1,11,245	51.66	Sandra Venkata Veeraiah	BRS	91,805	42.63	19,440	
Bhadradri Kothagudem	117	Kothagudem	Kunamneni Sambasiva Rao	CPI	80,336	42.75	Jalagam Venkat Rao	AIFB	53,789	28.62	26,547	
Bhadradri Kothagudem	118	Aswaraopeta (ST)	Jare Adinarayana	INC	74,993	55.05	Mecha Nageswara Rao	BRS	46,088	33.83	28,905	
Bhadradri Kothagudem	119	Bhadrachalam (ST)	Tellam Venkata Rao	BRS	53,252	45.08	Podem Veeraiah	INC	47,533	40.24	5,719	

== Aftermath ==
All India Congress Committee (AICC) named Revanth Reddy as the leader of Congress Party in Telangana, following the elected MLAs' resolution authorizing the AICC to nominate the leader, paving way for him to become the Chief Minister of Telangana.

On 7 December 2023, he took oath as the Chief Minister of Telangana, thus becoming the second person to hold the post. (Note: He is the second person to serve as CM, while being the third CM of the state, as K. Chandrashekar Rao served two terms.)

== Bypolls ==
District	Constituency		Winner				Runner up				Margin
District	No.	Name	Candidate	Party	Votes	%	Candidate	Party	Votes	%	Margin
Hyderabad	71	Secunderabad Cantt. (SC)	Sri Ganesh	INC	53,651	40.86	T. N. Vamsha Tilak	BJP	40,445	30.80	13,206
Hyderabad	71	Secunderabad Cantt. (SC)	Bypoll held on 13 May 2024 following the death of the incumbent member G. Lasya Nanditha from Bharat Rashtra Samithi on 23 February 2024.								
Hyderabad	61	Jubilee Hills	Naveen Yadav	INC	98,988	50.83	Maganti Sunitha	BRS	74,259	38.13	24,729
Hyderabad	61	Jubilee Hills	Bypoll held on 11 November 2025 following the death of the incumbent member Maganti Gopinath from Bharat Rashtra Samithi on 8 June 2025.								

== See also ==
- 2023 elections in India
- Elections in Telangana
