= Gattu Bheemudu =

Indian politician (died 2019)

Member of Legislative Assembly United Andhra Pradesh
- In office 1999–2004
- Preceded by: D. K. Bharat Simha Reddy
- Succeeded by: D. K. Aruna
- Constituency: Gadwal

Personal details
- Born: 1951/52
- Died: 12 June 2019 (aged 67)
- Party: Bharat Rashtra Samithi

Gattu Bheemudu was an Indian politician belonging to Bharat Rashtra Samithi. He was elected as a member of the Andhra Pradesh Legislative Assembly from Gadwal in 1999. He died on 12 June 2019 at the age of 67.
