= Thigul =

- Village
- Country: India
- State: Telangana
- District: Medak

Languages
  - Official: Telugu
- Time zone: UTC+5:30 (IST)

Thigul is a village in Gajwel constituency of Medak district in the Indian state of Telangana.
