= Bade Nagajyothi =

Indian politician (born 1994)

Bade Nagajyothi (born 5 January 1994) is an Indian politician from Telangana state. She is the chairperson of the Mulugu Zilla Praja Parishad. She was nominated by BRS to contest against former Naxal leader Seethakka as both her parents were former Maoist leaders.

== Early life ==
She was born to Bade Nageswara Rao and Rajeswari in the forests near Kalvapalli village of S.S. Tadvai mandal of the erstwhile Warangal district in 1994. Both her father and mother were former Maoist leaders. Her uncle Bade Chokka Rao, alias Damodar, was also a member of the banned Maoist party and was killed in January 2026 in a police operaton in Chhattisgarh. She was brought up by her grandparents and did her early schooling at Ashram school in Kalvapalli and later joined Chaitanya High School in Hanumkonda. She took to electoral politics on the advice of her paternal aunt, who was a doctor. She is a post-graduate with M.Sc. in botany and also has B.Ed. degree from Kakatiya University, Warangal. She quit as a teacher after joining politics. She is from Koya tribe. She married Jagadish during COVID 19 lock-down while she was the vice chairperson of ZPTC following all protocols in May 2020.

== Career ==
Nagajyothi started her political career as a Sarpanch, winning the local Zilla Parishad elections as an independent in her native village Kalavapalli in 2019 and was later unanimously elected as vice-chairman of the ZPTC in June 2019. Identified and groomed from June 2022, she is named as the Bharat Rashtra Samithi (BRS) candidate to contest the Mulugu constituency against Seethakka in the 2023 Telangana Legislative Assembly election. After filing her nomination on 10 November 2023, she took part in a road show. She lost to Seethakka by 33,700 votes in the elections held on 30 November 2023.

She was made the constituency incharge of Mulugu by BRS and in June 2025, she took up many issues regularly including those of the tribals whose houses were demolished by the forest department.
