= G. V. Vennela =

Indian politician (born 1979)

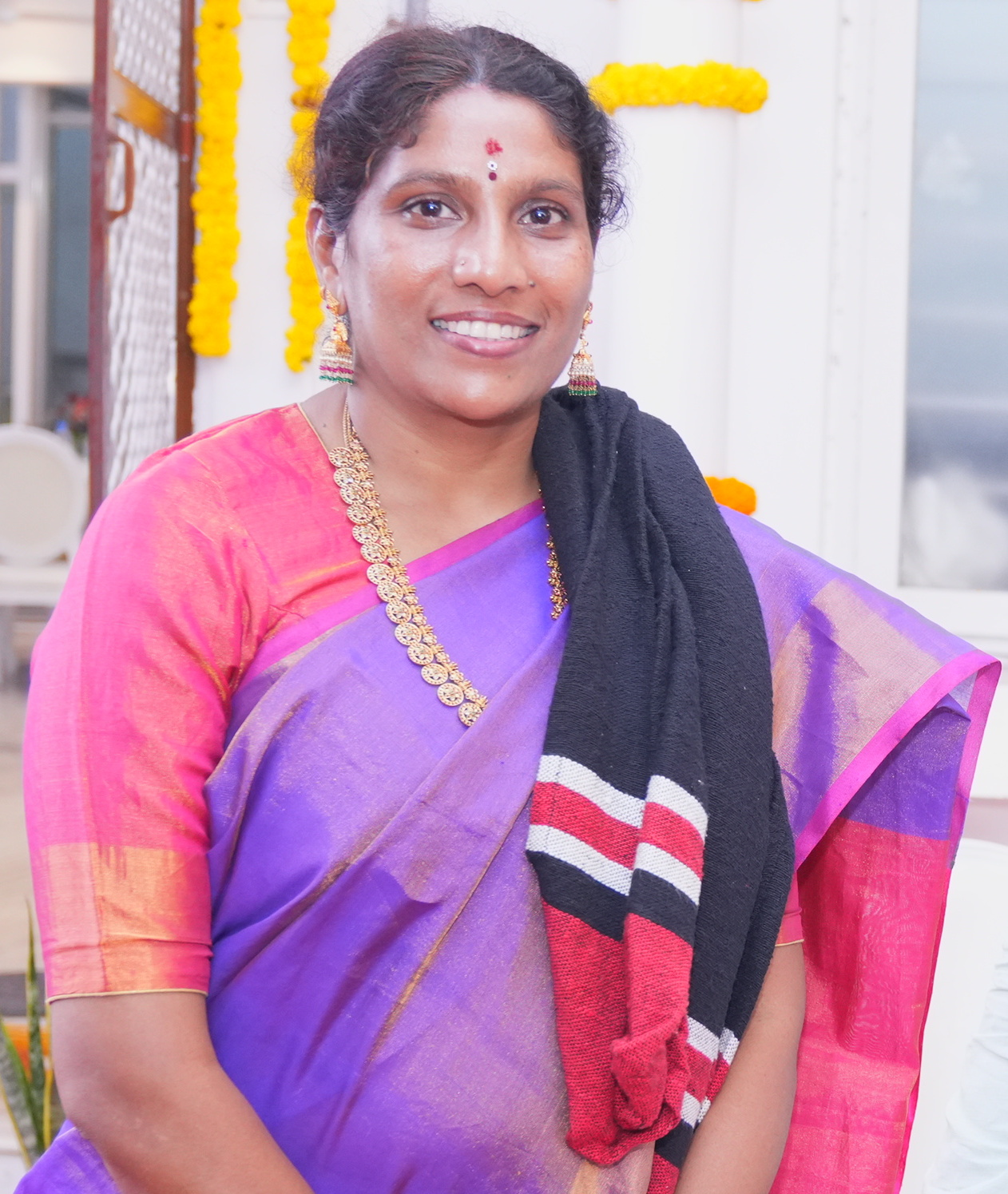

Gummadi V. Vennela (born 1979) is a Dalit Indian politician from Secunderabad, Telangana state. She is the daughter of renowned balladeer and poet, Gummadi Vittal Rao, who was popular as Gaddar.

== Early life and education ==
Vennela is born to Gaddar and Vimala. She has a brother, G V Suryam. She has two children. She is a graduate of Osmania University. She did her Ph.D. in management studies and she also has a post-graduate diploma in school management. She runs the school, Mahabodhi Vidyalaya, which was started by his father in Alwal neighbourhood of Secunderabad. She has been teaching for 18 years and for the last 10 years, she has been taking care of this school, which is known for providing education to poor children. She is also a dalit leader.

== Career ==
Vennela teaches at the Mahabodhi Vidyalaya and entered politics in 2023 after the death of her father. Her father Gaddar had registered a party named Gaddar Praja Party, but she joined Congress on the invitation of the top Congress leaders. Former Congress president Sonia Gandhi and top leaders Rahul Gandhi and Priyanka Gandhi met her after the Congress Working Committee (CWC) meeting in September at Hyderabad. She unsuccessfully contested as the Congress candidate from the Secunderabad Cantonment constituency in the 2023 Telangana Legislative Assembly Election. Initially, her brother Suryam along with his father Gaddar actively took part in the 'People's March' by Congress leader Mallu Bhatti Vikramaka and he sought the MLA ticket but Congress party decided to name Vennela as a strategic move as the constituency became a hot seat and the party felt she had a better chance..She contested the elections for the first time. Prior to her election, she undertook a padayatra (political march) to spread awareness about the minority issues pertaining to Muslims, Christians, Sikhs and Dalits. "Vidya (education), Vaidya (health), and Udyogam (jobs)" are the three issues on which she fought the election. She has been active along with his brother Suryam in the Telangana Praja Front, started by his father in 2010 to support separate Telangana state agitation.
