= Chinthakunta Vijaya Ramana Rao =

Indian politician

Chinthakunta Vijaya Ramana Rao (born 1966), also known as Janagama Vijaya Ramana Rao, is an Indian politician from Telangana state. He is a two time Member of the Legislative Assembly (MLA) from Peddapalli Assembly constituency in Peddapalli district. He represents Indian National Congress and won the 2023 Telangana Legislative Assembly election. Earlier, he first won as an MLA in 2009, in the erstwhile united Andhra Pradesh.

== Early life and education ==
Rao is from Shivapalli village, Eligaid mandal, Karimnagar. His father Govinda Rao is a farmer. He did his intermediate in 1984 at Government Junior College, Sultanabad, Peddapalli. He was adopted by his father in law, Jangama Raja Gopala Rao of Roopnarayanapeta, Odela mandal, Karimnagar district. He married Pavani and they have a son, Gopikrishna, and a daughter, Vaishnavi.

== Career ==
Rao won from Peddapalli Assembly constituency representing Indian National Congress in the 2023 Telangana Legislative Assembly election. He polled 118,888 votes and defeated his nearest rival, Dasari Manohar Reddy of Bharat Rashtra Samithi, by a huge margin of 55,108 votes. He lost to Manohar Reddy of Telangana Rashtra Samithi in the 2018 Telangana Legislative Assembly election by a margin of 8,466 votes. Rao polled 74,299 votes.

He won the 2009 Andhra Pradesh Legislative Assembly election from Peddapalli Assembly constituency representing Telugu Desam Party. He polled 64,319 votes and defeated his nearest rival, Mukunda Reddy Geetla of Indian National Congress, by a margin of 23,482 votes.

Vijaya Ramana Rao won the 2023 Telangana Legislative Assembly election and later he was Appointed as Govt Whip on 19 March 2026.
