= D. K. Aruna =

Indian politician from Telangana

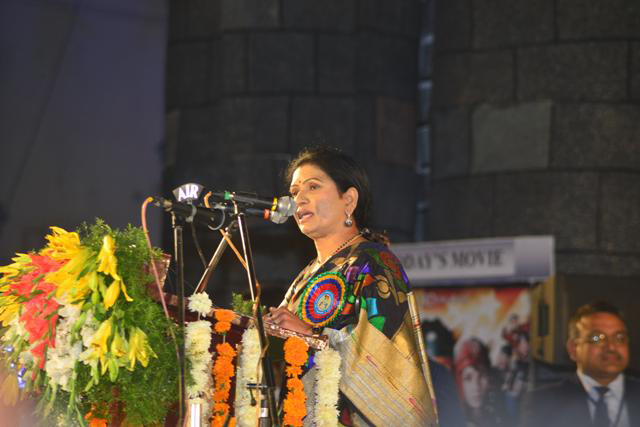
- Smt. D. K. Aruna during public speech

Member of Parliament, Lok Sabha
- Incumbent
- Assumed office 24 June 2024
- Preceded by: Manne Srinivas Reddy
- Constituency: Mahabubnagar

National Vice-President of the Bharatiya Janata Party
- Incumbent
- Assumed office 26 September 2020
- National President: J. P. Nadda

Member of Telangana Legislative Assembly
- In office 2 June 2014 – 11 December 2018
- Preceded by: Telangana Assembly Created
- Succeeded by: Bandla Krishna Mohan Reddy
- Constituency: Gadwal

Minister of Cinematography, Information and Public Relations Government of Andhra Pradesh
- In office 25 November 2010 – 21 February 2014
- Governor: E. S. L. Narasimhan
- Chief Minister: Kiran Kumar Reddy
- Preceded by: J. Geeta Reddy
- Succeeded by: President's Rule

Minister of Small Scale industries Government of Andhra Pradesh
- In office 25 May 2009 – 24 November 2010
- Governor: N. D. Tiwari; E. S. L. Narasimhan
- Chief Minister: Y. S. Rajasekhara Reddy; Konijeti Rosaiah
- Preceded by: Gollapalli Surya Rao
- Succeeded by: P. Shankar Rao

Member of Legislative Assembly Andhra Pradesh
- In office 11 May 2004 – 2 June 2014
- Preceded by: Gattu Bheemudu
- Succeeded by: Telangana Assembly Created
- Constituency: Gadwal

Personal details
- Born: 4 May 1960 (age 66) Narayanpet
- Party: Bharatiya Janata Party (2019 - Present)
- Other political affiliations: Indian National Congress (2004 - 2019); Samajwadi Party (1999 - 2004)
- Spouse: D.K. Bharatha Simha Reddy
- Children: Sravanti Reddy, Snigdha Reddy, Sruti Reddy
- Education: Raja Bahadur Venkata Rama Reddy Women's College, Hyderabad
- Occupation: Agriculture and Politician

Dharmavarapu Kottam Aruna (born 4 May 1960) is an Indian politician from Telangana state. She served as a minister in Andhra Pradesh for Information and Public Relations in Y. S. Rajasekhara Reddy's cabinet (2004–2009) and for Small Scale industries, Sugar, Khadi and Village Industries in Rosaiah's cabinet (2009–2010). She represented Gadwal constituency as an MLA in Andhra Pradesh Legislative Assembly between 2004–2014 and in Telangana Legislative Assembly between 2014 and 2018.

Aruna won the 2004 election under Samajwadi Party but later joined the Indian National Congress. She joined Bharatiya Janata Party in 2019 and was appointed its National Vice President in September 2020. Member of parliament Constituency-Mahabubnagar.

== Electoral history ==
Year	Constituency	Party	Votes	Opponent		Result	Margin
1996	Mahabubnagar	TDP	211,402	INC	Mallikarjun Goud	Lost	-3,700
1998	Mahabubnagar	INC	216,161	JP	S. Jaipal Reddy	Lost	-31,500
1999	Gadwal	INC	43,261	TDP	Ghattu Bheemudu	Lost	-4,546
2004	Gadwal	SP	80,676	TDP	Ghattu Bheemudu	Won	38,686
2009	Gadwal	INC	63,433	TDP	Bandla Krishna Mohan Reddy	Won	10,331
2014	Gadwal	INC	83,355	TRS	Bandla Krishna Mohan Reddy	Won	8,260
2018	Gadwal	INC	72,155	TRS	Bandla Krishna Mohan Reddy	Lost	-28,260
2019	Mahabubnagar	BJP	333,573	TRS	Manne Srinivas Reddy	Lost	-77,829
2024	Mahabubnagar	BJP	510,747	INC	Challa Vamshi Chand Reddy	Won	4,500

== Early life ==
DK Aruna was born on 4 May 1960 to Ch. Narsi Reddy. She is married to D.K. Bharathsimha Reddy and has three children.

Aruna studied science up to Intermediate. She married into a family of politicians and Congress members aged 16.

Her father-in-law, D.K. Satya Reddy, her husband D.K. Bharatha Simha Reddy, and her brother-in-law D.K. Samara Simha Reddy have all been involved in politics. Her father Chitlem Narsi Reddy, brothers Chitlem Venkateswar Reddy and Chitlem Ram Mohan Reddy are congress workers and legislators.

Her father and brother, Venkateswar were assassinated by Maoists on Independence Day in 2005 while attending the celebrations at Narayanpet.

Her entry into public life happened after becoming involved with "grievance redressal" sessions held at the house of her husband's family.

== Political career ==
Losing her first few elections by narrow margins, she was MLA from Gadwal constituency of Mahaboobnagar district for the first time in 2004.

In 2004, D.K. Aruna won representing the Samajwadi Party and subsequently represented Congress in the 2009 elections. While in the opposition, she participated in the historic Electricity agitation, led a Padayatra from Gadwal to the State capital to highlight the irrigation water problems of the farmers in Mahaboobnagar District and went on an indefinite hunger strike for irrigation water to the dry lands of Telangana.

She has also gone on Padayatra from Jamulamma temple in Gadwal mandal to Jogulamba temple in Alampur and later a two-day hunger strike to protest against the State government's refusal to form Gadwal as part of a new district in September 2016.

In 2018, Aruna lost 2018 Telangana Legislative Assembly election from Gadwal to her nephew Bandla Krishna Mohan Reddy of Telangana Rashtra Samithi.

In March 2019, she joined the Bharatiya Janata Party and she contested 2019 Lok sabha elections from Mahabubnagar constituency where she lost by 77,829 votes.

In September 2020, She was appointed Vice President of Bharatiya Janata Party.
