= Gadwal Assembly constituency =

Constituency of the Telangana legislative assembly in India

Gadwal
- Constituency No. 79 for the Telangana Legislative Assembly
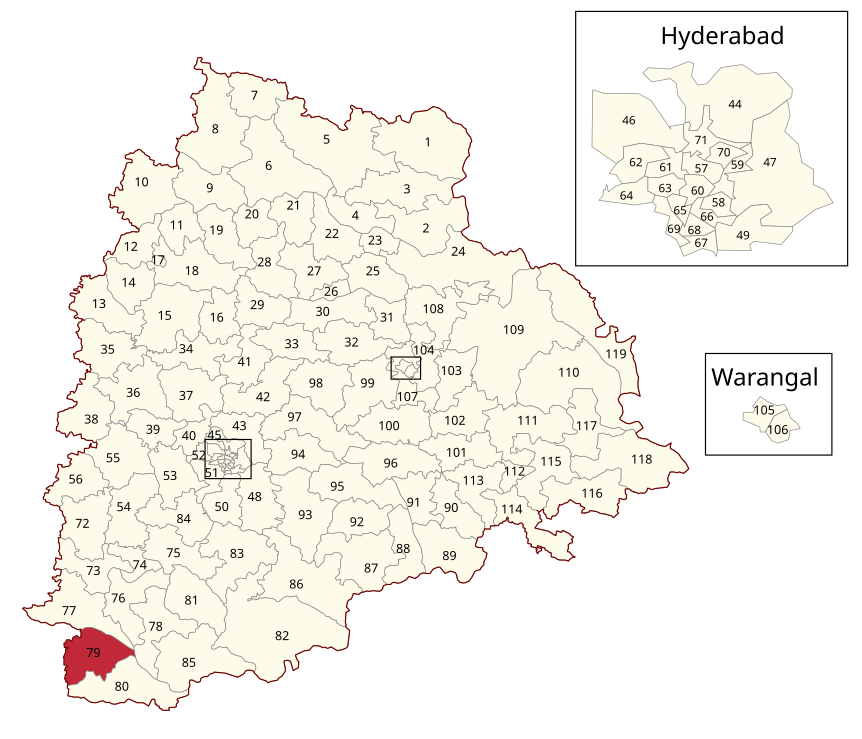
- Location of Gadwal Assembly constituency within Telangana

Constituency details
- Country: India
- Region: South India
- State: Telangana
- District: Jogulamba Gadwal
- Lok Sabha constituency: Nagarkurnool
- Established: 1951
- Total electors: 2,34,943
- Reservation: None

Member of Legislative Assembly
- 3rd Telangana Legislative Assembly
- Incumbent Bandla Krishna Mohan Reddy
- Party: Indian National Congress
- Elected year: 2023

Gadwal Assembly constituency is a constituency of Telangana Legislative Assembly, India. It is one of 14 constituencies in Mahbubnagar district. It is part of Nagarkurnool Lok Sabha constituency. The incumbent MLA is Bandla Krishna Mohan Reddy of the INC.

== Mandals ==
The Assembly Constituency presently comprises the following Mandals:

Mandal
Gadwal
Maldakal
Ghattu
Dharoor
Kaloor Timmanadoddi

== Members of the Legislative Assembly ==
Year of election	MLA	Political party
Andhra Pradesh
1957	D. K. Satya Reddy	Independent politician
1962	Raja Krishna Ram Bhupal	Indian National Congress
1967	Uppala N. Gopal Reddy	Indian National Congress
1972	Paga Pulla Reddy	Indian National Congress
1978	D. K. Satya Reddy	Janata Party
1980 (byelection)	D.K Samara Simha Reddy	Indian National Congress
1983	D. K. Samara Simha Reddy	Indian National Congress
1985	Uppala N. Gopala Reddy	Telugu Desam Party
1987 (Recounting)	D.K. Samara Simha Reddy	Indian National Congress
1989	D.K. Samara Simha Reddy	Indian National Congress
1994	D. K. Bharata Simha Reddy	Independent politician
1999	Gattu Bheemudu	Telugu Desam Party
2004	D. K. Aruna	Samajwadi Party
2009	D. K. Aruna	Indian National Congress
2014	D. K. Aruna	Indian National Congress
2018	Bandla Krishna Mohan Reddy	Telangana Rashtra Samithi
2023	Bandla Krishna Mohan Reddy	Bharat Rashtra Samithi

== Election results ==
=== Telangana Legislative Assembly election, 2023 ===
Telangana Assembly Elections, 2023: Gadwal (Assembly constituency)
Party	Candidate	Votes	%	±%
BRS	Bandla Krishna Mohan Reddy	94,097	43.79	
INC	Saritha Thirupathaiah	87,061	40.52	
AIFB	Gongalla Ranjith Kumar	13,454	6.26	
BJP	Shiva Reddy	7,558	3.52	
Independent	B. R. Thimmanna	2,826	1.32	
BSP	Athikur Rahaman	1,771	0.82	
Independent	Raghavendrudu	1,143	0.53	
Independent	Ediga Parameshwar Goud	838	0.39	
Independent	Raju Gaddegothram	778	0.36	
NOTA	None of the Above	775	0.36	
Majority		7,036	3.27	
Turnout		2,14,872		
BRS hold		Swing		

=== Telangana Legislative Assembly election, 2018 ===
Telangana Assembly Elections, 2018: Gadwal
Party	Candidate	Votes	%	±%
BRS	Bandla Krishna Mohan Reddy	100,057	52.60%	
INC	D. K. Aruna	71,612	37.64%	
SFB	MD.Abdul Moheed Aqeel Khan	7,189	3.78%	
NOTA	None of the Above	1,315	0.69%	
Majority		28,445		
Turnout		1,90,234	83.94%	
BRS gain from INC		Swing		

=== Telangana Legislative Assembly election, 2014 ===
Telangana Assembly Elections, 2014: Gadwal (Assembly constituency)
Party	Candidate	Votes	%	±%
INC	D. K. Aruna	83,355	48.78%	
BRS	Bandla Krishna Mohan Reddy	75,095	43.95%	
Independent	Krishnaiah	3,576	2.09%	
Majority		8,260		
Turnout		1,70,866	82.51%	
INC hold		Swing		

=== Andhra Pradesh Legislative Assembly election, 2004 ===
Andhra Pradesh Assembly Elections, 2004: Gadwal (Assembly constituency)
Party	Candidate	Votes	%	±%
SP	D. K. Aruna	80,703	56.40%	
TDP	Ghattu Bheemudu	42,017	29.40%	
TRS	Nagardoddi Venkatramudu	9,501	6.60%	
Majority		38,686	27.1%	
Turnout		1,42,966	67.40%	
SP gain from TDP		Swing		
