= Peddapalle Assembly constituency =

Constituency of the Telangana legislative assembly in India

Coordinates: 18.24°N 78.33°E

Peddapalle
- Constituency No. 25 for the Telangana Legislative Assembly
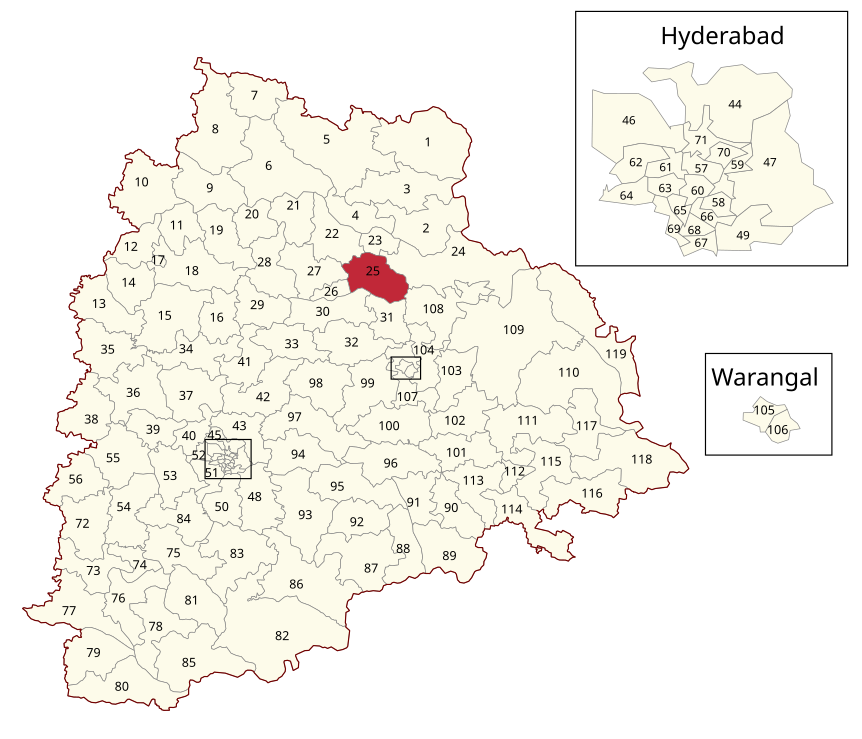
- Location of Peddapalle Assembly constituency within Telangana

Constituency details
- Country: India
- Region: South India
- State: Telangana
- District: Peddapalli
- Lok Sabha constituency: Peddapalli
- Established: 1951
- Total electors: 2,14,771
- Reservation: None

Member of Legislative Assembly
- 3rd Telangana Legislative Assembly
- Incumbent Chinthakunta Vijaya Ramana Rao
- Party: Indian National Congress

Peddapalle Assembly constituency is a constituency of Telangana Legislative Assembly, India. It is one of 3 constituencies in peddapalli district. It is part of Peddapalli Lok Sabha constituency.

Chinthakunta Vijaya Ramana Rao of Indian National Congress won the 2023 election with over majority of 55,108 votes.

== Mandals ==
The Assembly Constituency presently comprises the following Mandals:

Mandal
Peddapalle
Julapalle
Eligedu
Sultanabad
Odela
Kalva Srirampur

== Members of the Legislative Assembly ==
Year	Member	Political party
Hyderabad State
1952	L. Muttayya	People's Democratic Front
Andhra Pradesh
1962	Butti Raja Ram	Indian National Congress
1967	Jinna Malla Reddy	Independent
1972	Jinna Malla Reddy	Indian National Congress
1978	G. Raji Reddy	Indian National Congress
1983	Gone Prakash Rao	Telugu Desam Party
1983^	Geetla Mukunda Reddy	Indian National Congress
1985	Kalva Ramachandra Reddy	Telugu Desam Party
1989	Geetla Mukunda Reddy	Indian National Congress
1994	Birudu Rajamallu	Telugu Desam Party
1999	Gujjula Ramakishna Reddy	Bharatiya Janata Party
2004	Geetla Mukunda Reddy	Telangana Rashtra Samithi
2009	Chinthakunta Vijaya Ramana Rao	Telugu Desam Party
Telangana
2014	Dasari Manohar Reddy	Telangana Rashtra Samithi
2018	Dasari Manohar Reddy	Telangana Rashtra Samithi
2023	Chinthakunta Vijaya Ramana Rao	Indian National Congress

== Election results ==
=== Assembly Election 2023 ===
2023 Telangana Legislative Assembly election : Peddapalle
Party	Candidate	Votes	%	±%
INC	Chinthakunta Vijaya Ramana Rao	118,888	57.41%	▲17.22
BRS	Dasari Manohar Reddy	63,780	30.80%	▼13.97
BSP	Dasari Usha	10,315	4.98%	New
BJP	Pradeep Kumar Dugyala	6,312	3.05%	▼2.02
NOTA	None of the above	865	0.42%	▼0.58
Margin of victory		55,108	26.61%	▲32.03
Turnout		207,079	81.35%	▼2.73
Total valid votes		207,079		
INC gain from BRS		Swing	▲17.22	

=== Assembly Election 2018 ===
2018 Telangana Legislative Assembly election : Peddapalle
Party	Candidate	Votes	%	±%
TRS	Dasari Manohar Reddy	82,765	44.77%	▼13.09
INC	Chinthakunta Vijaya Ramana Rao	74,299	40.19%	▲20.02
BJP	Gujjula Ramakrishna Reddy	9,375	5.07%	New
Forward Bloc (Socialist)	Reddy Venugopal	8,499	4.60%	New
NOTA	None of the above	1,853	1.00%	New
Margin of victory		8,466	4.58%	▼33.11
Turnout		184,865	84.08%	▲8.08
Total valid votes		184,865		
TRS hold		Swing	▲13.09	

=== Assembly Election 2014 ===
2014 Telangana Legislative Assembly election : Peddapalle
Party	Candidate	Votes	%	±%
TRS	Dasari Manohar Reddy	96,220	57.86%	▲44.57
INC	T. Bhanu Prasad Rao	33,543	20.17%	▼5.34
TDP	Chinthakunta Vijaya Ramana Rao	24,216	14.56%	▼25.62
Independent	Edla Neela	5,840	3.51%	New
Margin of victory		62,677	37.69%	▲33.08
Turnout		167,829	76.00%	▲6.18
Total valid votes		167,829		
TRS gain from TDP		Swing	▲44.57	

=== Assembly Election 2009 ===
2009 Andhra Pradesh Legislative Assembly election : Peddapalle
Party	Candidate	Votes	%	±%
TDP	Chinthakunta Vijaya Ramana Rao	64,319	40.18%	New
INC	Geetla Mukunda Reddy	40,837	25.51%	New
TRS	C. Satyanarayana Reddy	20,827	13.01%	New
BJP	Gujjula Ramakrishna Reddy	13,479	8.42%	New
PRP	Vemula Padmavathi	11,412	7.13%	New
Margin of victory		23,482	14.61%	New
Total valid votes		160,103		
TDP win		Swing	New	

=== Assembly Election 2004 ===
2004 Andhra Pradesh Legislative Assembly election : Peddapalle
Party	Candidate	Votes	%	±%
TRS	Geetla Mukunda Reddy	59,697	48.38%	New
JP	Birudu Rajamallu	35,933	29.12%	New
Margin of victory		23,764	19.26%	New
Total valid votes		123,401		
TRS gain from BJP		Swing	New	

=== Assembly Election 1999 ===
1999 Andhra Pradesh Legislative Assembly election : Peddapalle
Party	Candidate	Votes	%	±%
BJP	Gujjula Ramakrishna Reddy	56,099	51.62%	New
INC	Geetla Mukunda Reddy	45,986	42.31%	New
Margin of victory		10,113	9.31%	New
Total valid votes		108,681		
BJP gain from TDP		Swing	New	

=== Assembly Election 1994 ===
1994 Andhra Pradesh Legislative Assembly election : Peddapalle
Party	Candidate	Votes	%	±%
TDP	Birudu Rajamallu	69,610	66.87%	New
INC	Geetla Mukunda Reddy	29,933	28.76%	New
Margin of victory		39,677	38.11%	New
Total valid votes		104,093		
TDP gain from INC		Swing	New	

=== Assembly Election 1989 ===
1989 Andhra Pradesh Legislative Assembly election : Peddapalle
Party	Candidate	Votes	%	±%
INC	Geetla Mukunda Reddy	46,781	52.30%	New
TDP	Kalva Ramachandra Reddy	39,120	43.73%	New
Margin of victory		7,661	8.57%	New
Total valid votes		89,447		
INC gain from TDP		Swing	New	

=== Assembly Election 1985 ===
1985 Andhra Pradesh Legislative Assembly election : Peddapalle
Party	Candidate	Votes	%	±%
TDP	Kalva Ramachandra Reddy	38,863	53.68%	New
INC	Geetla Mukunda Reddy	28,142	38.87%	New
Margin of victory		10,721	14.81%	New
Total valid votes		72,398		
TDP hold		Swing	New	

=== Assembly Election 1983 ===
1983 Andhra Pradesh Legislative Assembly election : Peddapalle
Party	Candidate	Votes	%	±%
Independent	Gone Prakash Rao	24,928	38.25%	New
INC	G. Raji Reddy	19,845	30.45%	New
Margin of victory		5,083	7.80%	New
Total valid votes		65,170		
Independent win		Swing	New	

=== Assembly Election 1978 ===
1978 Andhra Pradesh Legislative Assembly election : Peddapalle
Party	Candidate	Votes	%	±%
INC(I)	G. Raji Reddy	31,946	52.88%	New
JP	V. Jaganpathi Rao	17,812	29.49%	New
Margin of victory		14,134	23.39%	New
Total valid votes		60,412		
INC(I) gain from INC		Swing	New	

=== Assembly Election 1972 ===
1972 Andhra Pradesh Legislative Assembly election : Peddapalle
Party	Candidate	Votes	%	±%
INC	Jinna Malla Reddy	28,460	61.21%	New
Independent	B. V. Nateshan	14,812	31.85%	New
Margin of victory		13,648	29.36%	New
Total valid votes		46,500		
INC gain from Independent		Swing	New	

=== Assembly Election 1967 ===
1967 Andhra Pradesh Legislative Assembly election : Peddapalle
Party	Candidate	Votes	%	±%
Independent	Jinna Malla Reddy	18,245	44.12%	New
INC	Butti Raja Ram	15,310	37.02%	New
Margin of victory		2,935	7.10%	New
Total valid votes		41,353		
Independent win		Swing	New	

=== Assembly Election 1962 ===
1962 Andhra Pradesh Legislative Assembly election : Peddapalle
Party	Candidate	Votes	%	±%
INC	Butti Raja Ram	18,940	56.12%	New
CPI	L. Muttayya	12,310	36.47%	New
Margin of victory		6,630	19.65%	New
Total valid votes		33,750		
INC win		Swing	New	

=== Assembly Election 1952 ===
1952 Hyderabad State Legislative Assembly election : Peddapalle
Party	Candidate	Votes	%	±%
People's Democratic Front	L. Muttayya	16,840	54.20%	New
INC	B. V. Nateshan	11,210	36.08%	New
Margin of victory		5,630	18.12%	New
Total valid votes		31,070		
People's Democratic Front win		Swing	New	

=== Assembly Election 2018 ===
2018 Telangana Legislative Assembly election : Peddapalle
Party	Candidate	Votes	%	±%
TRS	Manohar Reddy Dasari	82,765	44.77%	
INC	Chinthakunta Vijaya Ramana Rao	74,299	40.19%	
BJP	Gujjula Ramakrishna Reddy	9,375	5.07%	
Forward Bloc (Socialist)	Reddy Venugopal	8,499	4.60%	
Telangana Karshaka Ramarajyam Party	Ponnala Sathish	2,085	1.13%	
Independent	Ravadi Kantha Rao	1,600	0.87%	
Independent	Mandala Krishna Reddy	1,038	0.56%	
BSP	Mamidipelli Bapaiah	876	0.47%	
Independent	Durgam Rajkumar	870	0.47%	
Independent	Shaik Abdul Bari	709	0.38%	
NCP	Babar Mohammed	648	0.35%	
Independent	Nampelli Swamy	623	0.34%	
AIFB	Raju Bommanaveni	406	0.22%	
SP	Thirupathi Maram	283	0.15%	
Independent	Nimmala Ashok	277	0.15%	
Bahujan Left Front	Sammaiah Guntipalli	265	0.14%	
Telangana Praja Party	Akula Swamy	247	0.13%	
None of the Above	NOTA	1,853	1.00%	
Majority		8,466	4.58%	{{{change}}}
Turnout		184,865	96.4%	{{{change}}}

=== Assembly Election 2014 ===
2014 Telangana Legislative Assembly election : Peddapalle
Party	Candidate	Votes	%	±%
TRS	Manohar Reddy Dasari	96,220	57.86%	
INC	T. Bhanu Prasad Rao	33,543	20.17%	
TDP	Chinthakunta Vijaya Ramana Rao	24,216	14.56%	
Independent	Edla Neela	5,840	3.51%	
Pyramid Party of India	Saritha Padma	1,791	1.08%	
BSP	Varikilla Mallesh	1,513	0.91%	
YSRCP	M.A.Mustak Pasha	736	0.44%	
AAP	Thammadoboina Odelu Yadav	665	0.40%	
Independent	Pendyala Surender	473	0.28%	
Independent	Shyam Sundar Attal	388	0.23%	
BC United Front	Kethipelli Sammi Reddy	364	0.22%	
ICSP	Kondra Enock	278	0.17%	
RLD	Donkena Ravindar	257	0.15%	
None of the Above	NOTA	1,545	0.92%	
Majority		62,677	37.69%	{{{change}}}
Turnout		167,829	76.0%	{{{change}}}

=== Assembly Election 2009 ===
2009 Andhra Pradesh Legislative Assembly election : Peddapalle
Party	Candidate	Votes	%	±%
TDP	Chinthakunta Vijaya Ramana Rao	64,319	40.17%	
INC	Mukunda Reddy Geetla	40,837	25.51%	
TRS	C. Satyanarayana Reddy	20,827	13.01%	
BJP	Gujjula Ramakrishna Reddy	13,479	8.42%	
PRP	Vemula Padmavathi	11,412	7.13%	
Independent	Bonala Kumari Kamala	2,419	1.51%	
BSP	Bakam Santosh Kumar	1,809	1.13%	
LSP	Madasu Srinivasa Rao	1,786	1.12%	
Independent	Kota Damodar Reddy	1,226	0.77%	
Independent	Katherla Rajanna	983	0.61%	
Marxist Communist Party of India	Krishna Reddy Tummala	503	0.31%	
Telangana Praja Party	Palle Mallesh	503	0.31%	
Majority		23,482	14.66%	{{{change}}}
Turnout		160,119		{{{change}}}

== See also ==
- List of constituencies of Telangana Legislative Assembly
