= K. Shankaraiah =

Indian politician (born 1979)

K. Shankaraiah (born 1979) is an Indian politician from Telangana state. He is an MLA from Shadnagar Assembly constituency in Ranga Reddy district. He represents Indian National Congress and won the 2023 Telangana Legislative Assembly election.

== Early life and education ==
Shankaraiah is from Shadnagar, Ranga Reddy district. His father K. Ramaiah is a farmer. He completed his Bachelor of Arts in 1992 at City College, which is affiliated with Osmania University.

== Career ==
Shankaraiah won from Shadnagar Assembly constituency representing Indian National Congress in the 2023 Telangana Legislative Assembly election. He polled 77,817 votes and defeated his nearest rival, Yelganamoni Anjaiah of Bharat Rashtra Samithi, by a margin of 7,128 votes.
