= Saritha Thirupathaiah =

Indian politician

Ex ZP Chairperson Jogulamba Gadwal
- In office June 2019 – July 2024

Personal details
- Born: 5 July 1983 (age 43) Manopad, Alampur, Jogulamba Gadwal, Telangana
- Party: Indian National Congress
- Other political affiliations: Bharat Rashtra Samithi
- Spouse: Thirupathaiah
- Children: 2
- Education: B S C, Sarojini Naidu Vanita Maha Vidyalaya, Nampally
- Occupation: Politician

Saritha Thirupathaiah is a politician from the state of Telangana. She is a leader of Indian National Congress. She served as ZP Chairperson Jogulamba Gadwal District.

== Political career ==
In 2019 ZPTC election she won from Manopad mandal and became ZP Chairperson of Jogulamba Gadwal District from Bharat Rashtra Samithi party. She Quit the party and joined Congress party in August 2023. She unsuccessfully contested from Gadwal assembly seat in 2023 Assembly elections, lost to Bandla Krishna Mohan Reddy of BRS party.
