= Gajwel Assembly constituency =

Constituency of the Telangana legislative assembly in India

Coordinates: 17.85°N 78.68°E

Gajwel
- Constituency No. 42 for the Telangana Legislative Assembly
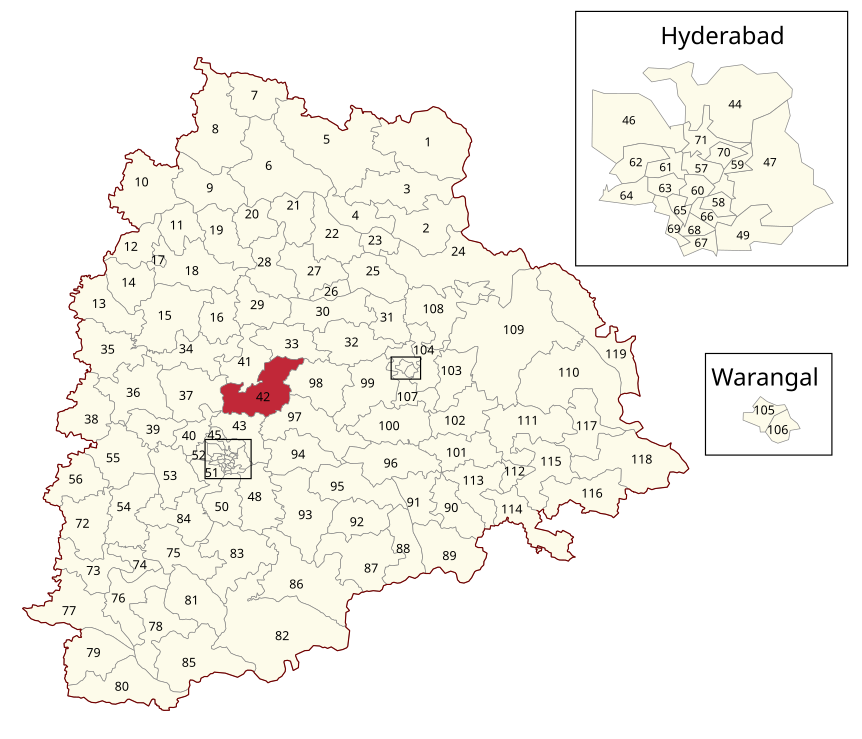
- Location of Gajwel Assembly constituency within Telangana

Constituency details
- Country: India
- Region: South India
- State: Telangana
- District: Medak, Siddipet
- Lok Sabha constituency: Medak
- Established: 1951
- Total electors: 232,417
- Reservation: None

Member of Legislative Assembly
- 3rd Telangana Legislative Assembly
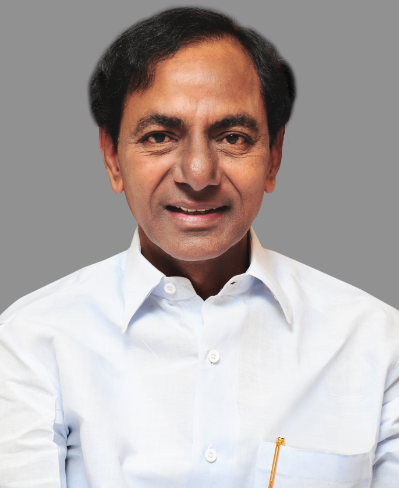
- Incumbent K. Chandrashekar Rao
- Party: Bharat Rashtra Samithi

Gajwel Assembly constituency is a constituency of the Telangana Legislative Assembly, India. It is part of Medak Lok Sabha constituency. It is one of the ten constituencies in the former Medak district, located approximately 64 km from the state capital, Hyderabad.

Kalvakuntla Chandrashekar Rao, the first Chief Minister of Telangana, has been the MLA since 2014.

== Mandals ==
The assembly constituency presently comprises the following mandals:

| Mandal | District |
|---|---|
| Gajwel | Siddipet |
| Toopran | Medak |
| Kondapaka | Siddipet |
| Wargal | Siddipet |
| Mulug | Siddipet |
| Jagadevpur | Siddipet |

== Members of Legislative Assembly ==
Members of Legislative Assembly who represented Gajwel:

| Year | Name | Party |
Hyderabad State
| 1952 | Pendem Vasudevu | Peoples Democratic Front |
Andhra Pradesh
| 1957 | J. B. Muthyal Rao | Indian National Congress |
| 1962 | Gajwel Saidiah | Independent |
| 1967 | J. B. Muthyal Rao | Indian National Congress |
| 1972 | Gajwel Saidiah | Indian National Congress |
| 1978 | Gajwel Saidiah | Indian National Congress |
| 1983 | Allam Sailu | Telugu Desam Party |
| 1985 | B. Sanjeeva Rao | Telugu Desam Party |
| 1989 | Dr. J. Geeta Reddy | Indian National Congress |
| 1994 | G. Vijaya Rama Rao | Telugu Desam Party |
| 1999 | B. Sanjeeva Rao | Telugu Desam Party |
| 2004 | Dr. J. Geeta Reddy | Indian National Congress |
| 2009 | Tumkunta Narsa Reddy | Indian National Congress |
Telangana
| 2014 | K. Chandrashekar Rao | Bharat Rashtra Samithi |
| 2018 | K. Chandrashekar Rao | Bharat Rashtra Samithi |
| 2023 | K. Chandrashekar Rao | Bharat Rashtra Samithi |

== Election results ==
Vote share of winning candidates
| 2023 | 48.05% |
| 2018 | 60.45% |
| 2014 | 44.06% |

=== Telangana Legislative Assembly election, 2023 ===
2023 Telangana Legislative Assembly election: Gajwel
| Party | Candidate | Votes | % | ±% |
|---|---|---|---|---|
| BRS | Kalvakuntla Chandrashekhar Rao | 111,684 | 48.05 | ▼12.4 |
| BJP | Etela Rajender | 66,653 | 28.68 | New |
| INC | Thoomkunta Narsa Reddy | 32,568 | 14.01 | ▼18.35 |
| BSP | Jakkani Sanjay Kumar | 2,743 | 1.18 | |
| NOTA | None of the above | 832 | 0.36 | |
| Majority | | 45,031 | 19.37 | −8.72 |
| Turnout | | 2,32,417 | | |
| BRS hold | | Swing | | |

=== Telangana Legislative Assembly election, 2018 ===
Telangana Assembly Elections, 2018: Gajwel
| Party | Candidate | Votes | % | ±% |
|---|---|---|---|---|
| TRS | K. Chandrashekar Rao | 125,444 | 60.45 | ▲16.39 |
| INC | Pratap Reddy Vanteru | 67,154 | 32.36 | ▼15.04 |
| Independent | Kante Sayanna | 3,353 | 1.62 | New |
| Independent | Bitla Venkateshwerlu | 1,636 | 0.79 | New |
| NOTA | None of the Above | 1,624 | 0.78 | ▼0.03 |
| Majority | | 58,290 | 28.09 | |
| Turnout | | 2,07,520 | 88.97 | |
| TRS hold | | Swing | | |

=== Telangana Legislative Assembly election, 2014 ===
Telangana Assembly Elections, 2014: Gajwel
| Party | Candidate | Votes | % | ±% |
|---|---|---|---|---|
| TRS | K. Chandrashekar Rao | 86,694 | 44.06 | |
| TDP | Pratap Reddy Vanteru | 67,303 | 34.21 | |
| INC | Tumkunta Narsa Reddy | 34,085 | 17.32 | |
| TPS | Nallanagula Venkatesham | 3,127 | 1.59 | |
| NOTA | None of the Above | 1,592 | 0.81 | |
| Majority | | 19,391 | 9.85 | |
| Turnout | | 1,96,759 | 84.22 | |
| TRS gain from INC | | Swing | | |

== See also ==
- List of constituencies of Telangana Legislative Assembly
