= Dasari Manohar Reddy =

Indian politician

Member of the Telangana Legislative Assembly
- In office 2 June 2014 – 2023
- Preceded by: Ch. VijayaRamana Rao
- Constituency: Peddapalli, Telangana, India

Personal details
- Born: 25 February 1954 (age 72) Kasulapally
- Party: Telangana Rashtra Samithi
- Children: Dasari Prashanth Reddy (Chairman, Trinity Educational Institutions).
- Education: Nagpur University

Dasari Manohar Reddy is an Indian politician and member of the Telangana Legislative Assembly from the Peddapalli Constituency. He was first elected in 2014 then reelected in 2018. He was the founder of Trinity Educational Institutions.

He lost the Peddapalli Constituency election in 2023.
