= Bandla Krishna Mohan Reddy =

Indian politician

Member of Telangana Legislative Assembly
- Incumbent
- Assumed office 2018
- Preceded by: D. K. Aruna
- Constituency: Gadwal

Personal details
- Born: 26 November 1975 (age 50) Bureddypally, Dharoor Mandal, Jogulamba Gadwal district, Telangana
- Party: Bharat Rashtra Samithi (2014–2024, 2024–present)
- Other political affiliations: Indian National Congress (2024); Telugu Desam Party (until 2014)
- Parent: Venkatrami Reddy
- Education: Intermediate, Govt Junior College, Gadwal

Bandla Krishna Mohan Reddy (born 21 September 1967) is an Indian politician, who is currently serving as Member of Legislative Assembly from Gadwal Assembly constituency.

== Political career ==
Bandla Krishna Mohan Reddy during his school days he was an active leader in ABVP. He joined the Telugu Desam Party and contested from Gadwal in 2009 elections and lost to Congress candidate D. K. Aruna, he later joined Bharat Rashtra Samithi and contested as MLA in 2014 Assembly polls and lost to Indian National Congress candidate D. K. Aruna.

Bandla Krishna Mohan Reddy contested 2018 elections on BRS ticket and elected to the State Assembly from Gadwal, defeating his nearest rival INC candidate D. K. Aruna with a majority of 28,445 votes. In 2023 elections he contested on BRS ticket and consecutively elected second time as MLA by defeating his nearest rival Congress candidate Saritha Thirupathaiah with a majority of 7,036 votes.

Krishna Mohan Reddy joined INC in the presence of Chief Minister and PCC president Anumula Revanth Reddy and other party leaders at the CM's residence at Jubilee Hills on 6 July 2024. He returned to BRS after meeting party president K. T. Rama Rao on 31 July 2024.
