= Chamala Kiran Kumar Reddy =

Indian politician

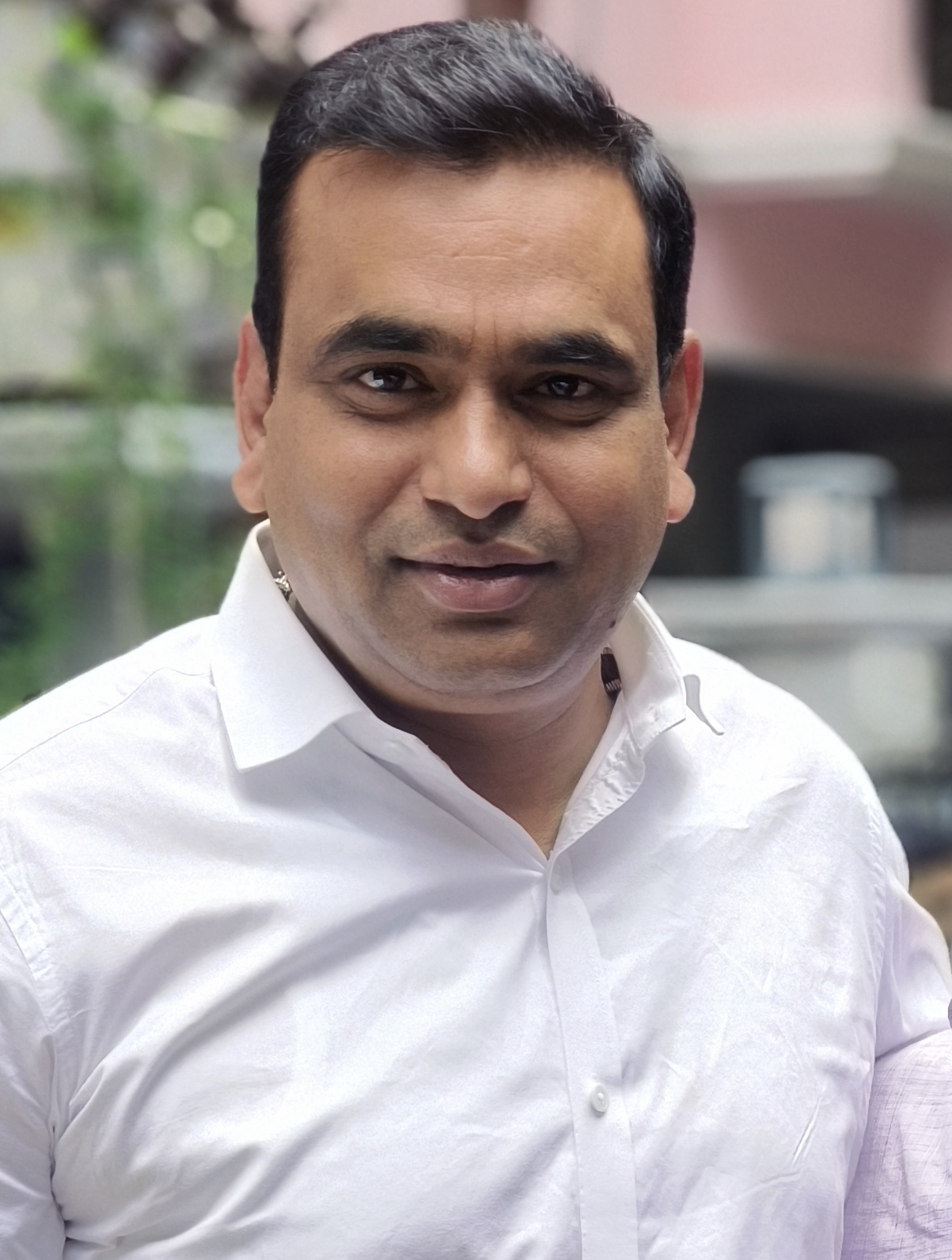

Member of Parliament, Lok Sabha
- Incumbent
- Assumed office 2024
- Preceded by: Komatireddy Venkat Reddy
- Constituency: Bhongir

Personal details
- Born: 24 October 1974 (age 51) Shaligouraram, Telangana, India
- Party: Indian National Congress (INC)
- Spouse: Chamala Dimple
- Children: 2 Daughters
- Parent(s): Chamala Vasudeva Reddy, Aruna
- Profession: Politician

Chamala Kiran Kumar Reddy (born 24 October 1974) is an Indian politician, currently a Member of Parliament in the Lok Sabha from Bhongir, Telangana. He was born in Shaligouraram Mandal, Thungathurthy Assembly constituency.

Chamala Kiran Kumar Reddy topped with 100% attendance as Lok Sabha member from Telangana in participating in debates during the Parliament sessions between 24 June 2024 to 4 April 2025.

== Early life ==
He learned the values of diligence and sincerity from his father Chamala Vasudeva Reddy. He completed his Diploma in Hotel Management. Kiran started his political journey with the Indian Youth Congress and was an active member of the Congress Party in Telangana with dedication, strategic planning and efforts to support party activities.

== Political career ==
Kiran was elected as a Member of Parliament (MP) from the Bhongir Loksabha Constituency in the 2024 Indian General Election. He won against former MP Boora Narsaiah Goud. He has also occupied leadership positions in this organization, such as General Secretary, Spokesperson, Vice President etc.

== Key Positions Held ==
=== 2021 - Present: Vice President & Media Incharge, Telangana Pradesh Congress Committee (TPCC) ===
He oversees the media strategy for the Telangana PCC, creating messages designed to engage with the residents of Hyderabad and the surrounding areas.

=== 2017 - 2021: Spokesperson, Telangana Pradesh Congress Committee (TPCC) ===
He communicated the party's vision to the public, representing the party in various forums.

=== 2009 - 2011: General Secretary, Indian Youth Congress ===
He was responsible for overseeing activities in regions including Pondicherry, Tamil Nadu, Kerala, Lakshadweep, and Andaman & Nicobar, focusing on youth initiatives.

=== 2008 - 2009: Secretary, Indian Youth Congress ===
He worked on strategies and youth mobilization efforts in Maharashtra, Goa, and Dadra and Nagar Haveli.

=== 2007 - 2008: Task Force Member for Rahul Gandhi’s Discovery India Tour ===
He participated in Rahul Gandhi's Discovery India tour, contributing to the Aam Aadmi Ka Sipahi campaign, which focused on grassroots engagement.

=== 2005 - 2006: General Secretary, Andhra Pradesh Youth Congress ===
He demonstrated organizational skills and worked to engage young members of the Andhra Pradesh Youth Congress.

== See also ==
- 18th Lok Sabha
- List of members of the 18th Lok Sabha
- List of Congress Lok Sabha Members
