= Wadaparthy =

- village
- Location in Telangana, India Wadaparthy (India)
- Coordinates: 17.5590753°N 78.8335294°E
- Country: India
- State: Telangana
- District: Yadadri district

Languages
  - Official: Telugu
- Time zone: UTC+5:30 (IST)
- PIN: 508116
- Telephone code: 08685
- Vehicle registration: TG
- Lok Sabha constituency: Bhongiri
- Vidhan Sabha constituency: Bhongiri
- Website: telangana.gov.in

Wadaparthy is a village in the Yadadri district of the Indian state of Telangana. It is administered under Bhongir mandal of Bhongir revenue division.

== Politics ==
Shri Alimineti Madhava Reddy was born Wadaparthy on 28 February 1949 and he was a politician from Telugu Desam Party. He was unanimously elected as Sarpanch of Wadaparthy on 5 May 1981. He got elected to Legislative assembly of Andhra Pradesh from Bhongir assembly constituency from Telugu Desam Party (TDP) political party in 1985 as first time. He worked as Ex Home Minister of Andhra Pradesh.
