= Addanki Dayakar =

Indian politician

Govt Whip
- Incumbent
- Assumed office 19 March 2026

Member of Legislative Council Telangana
- In office 19 March 2026 – Incumbent
- Constituency: Elected by MLAs

Personal details
- Born: 1971 (age 54–55) Nemmikallu, Athmakur Mandal, Surayapet District, Telangana, India
- Party: Indian National Congress
- Spouse: Nagamani
- Education: Osmania University (M.Com, M.Phil, PhD)

Addanki Dayakar (born 1971) is an actor and Indian politician from Telangana. He was unanimously elected as member of Telangana Legislative Council on 13 March 2025 and took oath as MLC on 7 April 2025. Earlier, he was named as Indian National Congress candidate for the MLC elections under the MLA quota on 9 March 2025.

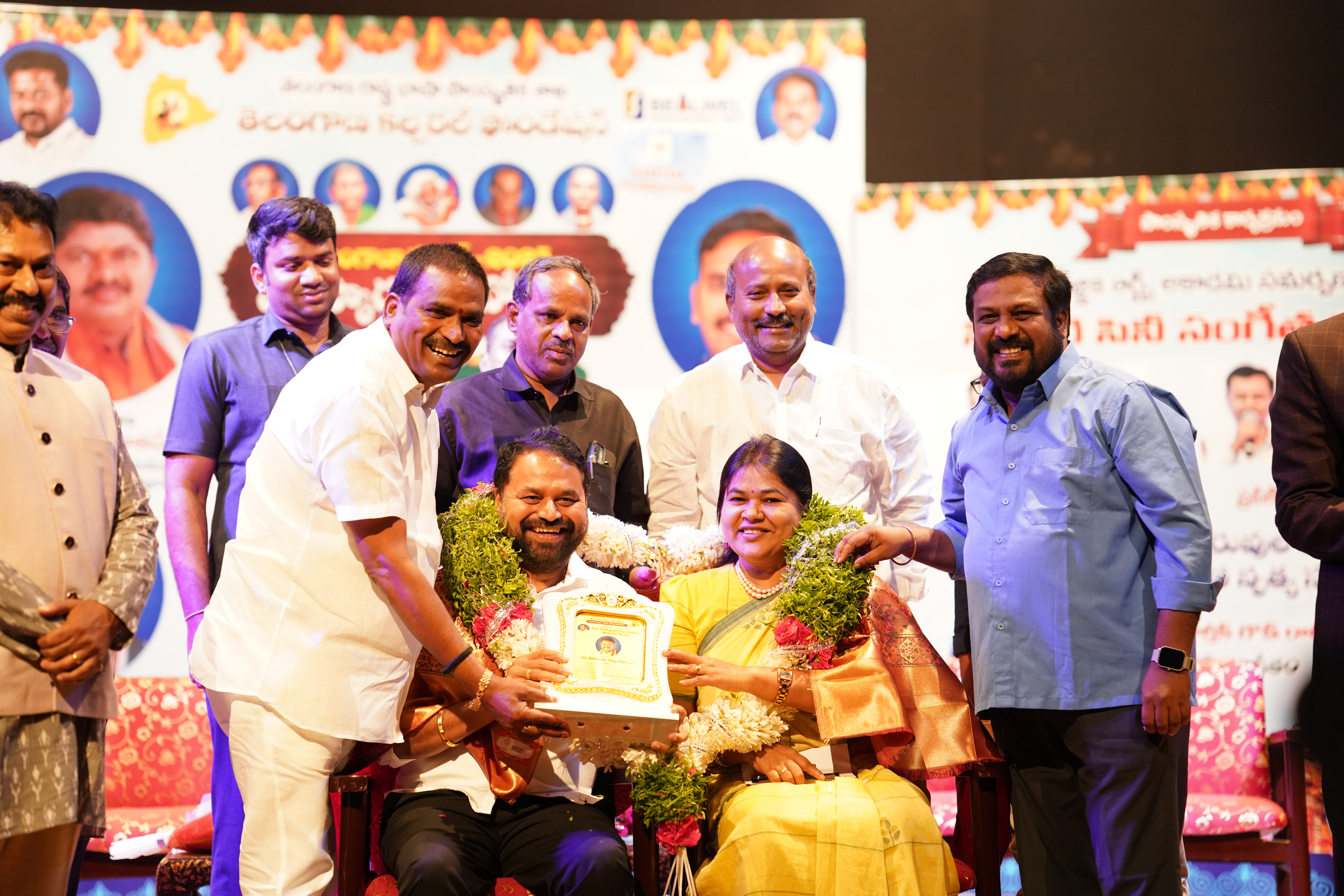
Addanki Dayakar Received Professor Jayashankar Award on 27 July 2025 in Ravindra Bharathi

== Early life and education ==
Dayakar is from Nemmikallu, Suryapet district, Telangana. He is the son of Addanki Ramalachu. He completed his Master of Commerce at Mahatma Gandhi University, Nalgonda in 1997, and did MCA at St. Patrick post graduate college, Hyderabad. He is now registered for his PhD course at Osmania University. He married Nagamani, a government teacher.

== Political career ==
After being active in the Telangana statehood movement, he started his political career after the formation of Telangana with the Indian National Congress Party. He contested unsuccessfully as the Congress candidate in the 2014 Telangana Legislative Assembly election from the Thungathurthi Assembly constituency, which is reserved for the Scheduled Caste community in Nalgonda district. He polled 62,003 votes but lost to Gadari Kishore Kumar of the Telangana Rashtra Samithi by a margin of 2,379 votes. He contested again on the Congress ticket in the 2018 Assembly elections and lost the same candidate by a margin of 1,847 votes. He was denied a ticket in 2023 Assembly election in favour of Mandula Samuel, who won the Thungathurthi seat back for Congress.

In April 2025, he was appointed as the observer of the Congress Party for the Jangaon district as part of the District Pradesh Congress Committee observer.

He was Appointed as Govt Whip on 19 March 2026.

== Filmography ==
- Jai Bolo Telangana (2011)
- Bheemadevarapally Branchi (2024)
