= Bhongir Lok Sabha constituency =

Constituency of the Indian parliament in Telangana

Coordinates: 17.5°N 78.9°E

Bhongir TG-14
- Lok Sabha constituency
- Bhongir Lok Sabha constituency in Telangana

Constituency details
- Country: India
- Region: South India
- State: Telangana
- Assembly constituencies: Ibrahimpatnam; Munugode; Bhongir; Nakrekal; Thungathurthi; Alair; Jangaon
- Established: 2008
- Total electors: 1,492,251
- Reservation: None

Member of Parliament
- 18th Lok Sabha
- Incumbent Chamala Kiran Kumar Reddy
- Party: INC
- Elected year: 2024

Bhongir Lok Sabha constituency is one of the 17 Lok Sabha constituencies in Telangana state in southern India.

Chamala Kiran Kumar Reddy of Indian National Congress is currently representing the constituency for first time.

== History ==
The constituency came into existence in 2008, following the implementation of delimitation of parliamentary constituencies based on the recommendations of the Delimitation Commission of India.

== Assembly segments ==
Bhuvanagiri Lok Sabha constituency comprises the following Legislative Assembly segments:

No	Name	District	Member	Party	Leading (in 2024)
48	Ibrahimpatnam	Ranga Reddy	Malreddy Ranga Reddy	INC	INC
93	Munugode	Nalgonda	Komatireddy Raj Gopal Reddy	INC	INC
94	Bhongir	Yadadri Bhuvanagiri	Kumbam Anil Kumar Reddy	INC	INC
95	Nakrekal (SC)	Nalgonda	Vemula Veeresham	INC	INC
96	Thungathurthi (SC)	Suryapet	Mandula Samuel	INC	INC
97	Alair	Yadadri Bhuvanagiri	Beerla Ilaiah	INC	INC
98	Jangaon	Jangaon	Palla Rajeshwar Reddy	BRS	INC

== Members of Parliament ==
Year	Member	Party
1952-2008 : Constituency did not exist
Andhra Pradesh
2009	Komatireddy Raj Gopal Reddy	Indian National Congress
Telangana
2014	Burra Narsaiah	Telangana Rashtra Samithi
2019	Komatireddy Venkat Reddy	Indian National Congress
2024	Chamala Kiran Kumar Reddy	Indian National Congress

== Election results ==
=== General election, 2024 ===
2024 Indian general election: Bhongir
Party	Candidate	Votes	%	±%
INC	Chamala Kiran Kumar Reddy	629,143	44.89	▲0.52
BJP	Boora Narsaiah Goud	406,973	29.04	▲23.59
BRS	Kyama Mallesham	256,187	18.28	▼25.66
CPI(M)	Mohammad Jahangir	28,730	2.05	▼0.27
NOTA	None of the above	4,646	0.33	
Majority		222,170	15.85	▲15.42
Turnout		1,401,396	76.78	▲2.29
INC hold		Swing	▲0.52	

=== General election, 2019 ===
2019 Indian general elections: Bhongir
Party	Candidate	Votes	%	±%
INC	Komatireddy Venkat Reddy	532,795	44.37	▲9.90
TRS	Boora Narsaiah Goud	527,576	43.94	▲6.95
BJP	Padala Venkata Shyam Sunder Rao	65,451	5.45	▼9.67
CPI	Goda Sri Ramulu	28,153	2.32	▼2.14
Majority		5,119	0.43	▼2.09
Turnout		1,212,777	74.49	▼6.78
INC gain from TRS		Swing		

=== General election, 2014 ===
2014 Indian general elections: Bhongir
Party	Candidate	Votes	%	±%
TRS	Burra Narsaiah	448,245	36.99	N/A
INC	Komatireddy Raj Gopal Reddy	417,751	34.47	−10.23
BJP	Indrasena Reddy	183,217	15.12	N/A
CPI(M)	Cherupally Seetha Ramulu	54,035	4.46	
AIMIM	Guahati Mothilal	2,600	0.20	
Majority		30,494	2.52	−9.89
Turnout		1,212,738	81.27	+4.99
TRS gain from INC		Swing	+31.87	

=== General election, 2009 ===
2009 Indian general elections: Bhongir
Party	Candidate	Votes	%	±%
INC	Komatireddy Raj Gopal Reddy	504,103	44.70	
CPI(M)	Nomula Narsimhaiah	364,215	32.29	
PRP	Chandra Mouli	104,872	9.30	
BJP	Chintha Samba Murthy	45,898	4.06	
Majority		139,978	12.41	
Turnout		1,128,240	76.32	
INC win (new seat)				

== See also ==
- Nalgonda district
