= Munugode Assembly constituency =

Constituency of the Telangana legislative assembly in India

Coordinates: 17.08°N 79.08°E

Munugode
- Constituency No. 93 for the Telangana Legislative Assembly
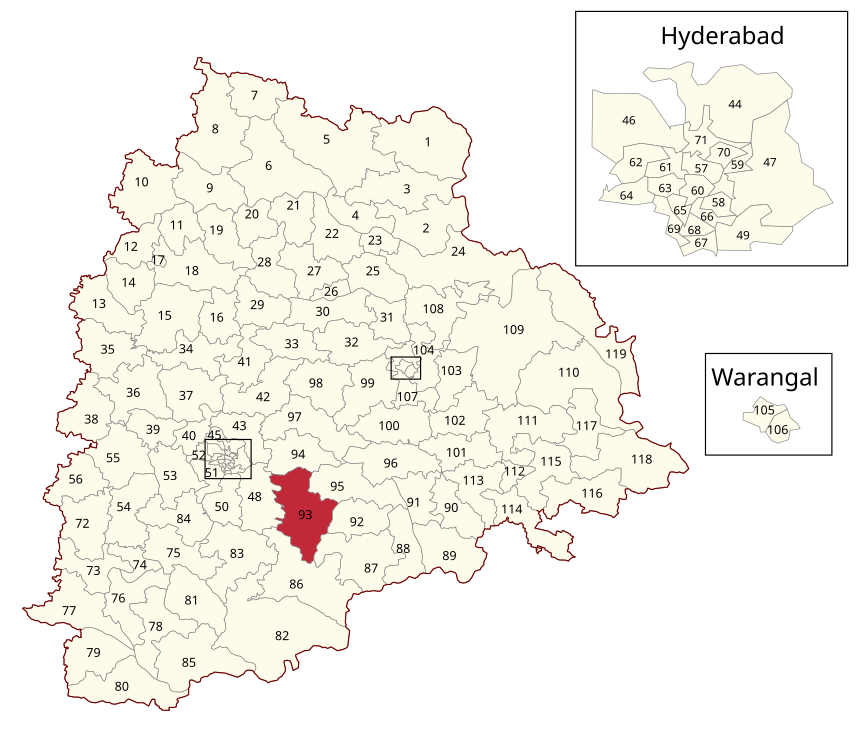
- Location of Munugode Assembly constituency within Telangana

Constituency details
- Country: India
- Region: South India
- State: Telangana
- District: Nalgonda
- Lok Sabha constituency: Bhongir
- Established: 1967
- Total electors: 2,41,805
- Reservation: None

Member of Legislative Assembly
- 3rd Telangana Legislative Assembly
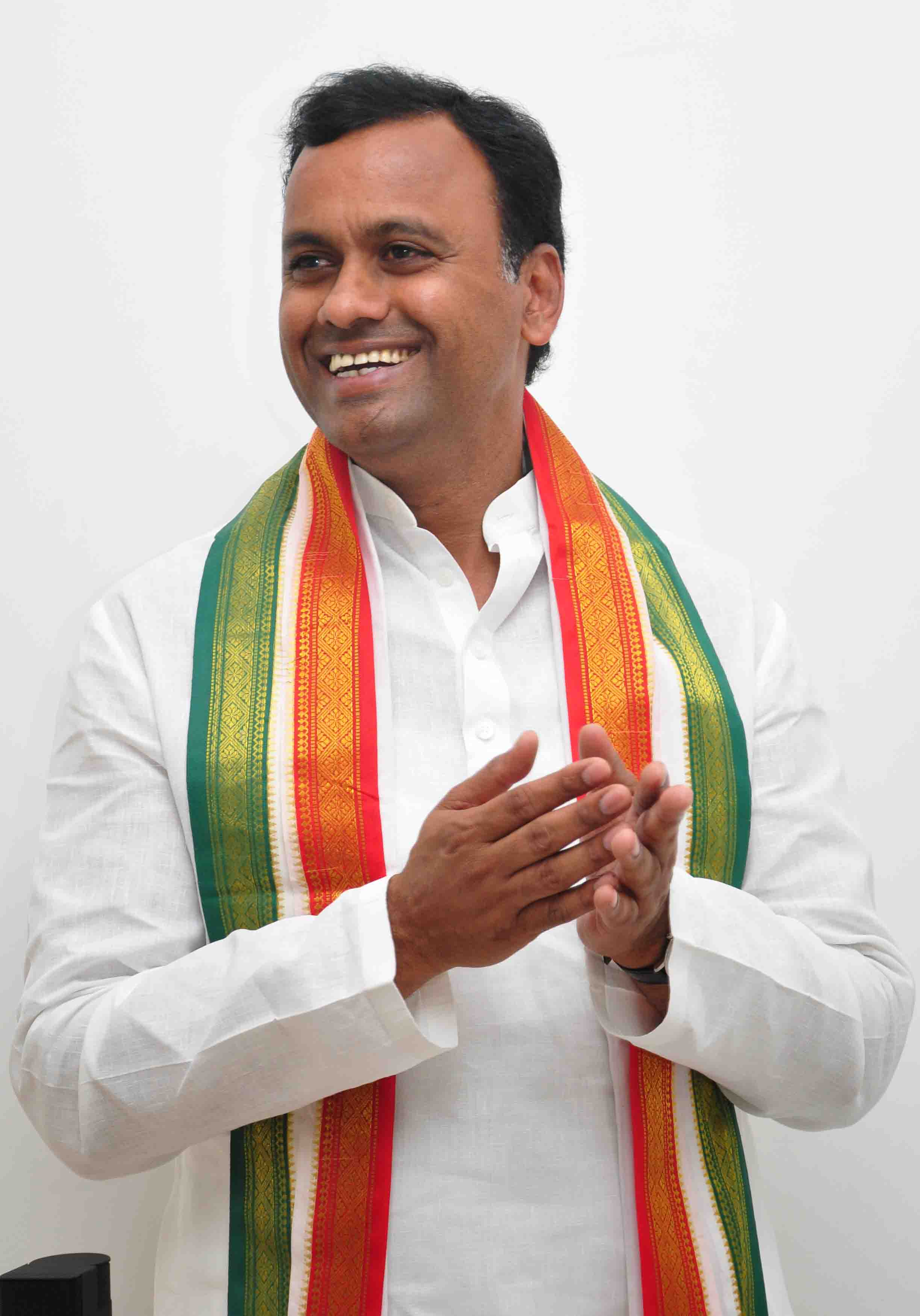
- Incumbent Komatireddy Raj Gopal Reddy
- Party: Indian National Congress
- Elected year: 2023

Munugode Assembly constituency is a constituency of the Telangana Legislative Assembly, India. It is one of 12 constituencies in Nalgonda district. The constituency headquarters is Chandur. It is part of Bhongir Lok Sabha constituency.

Komatireddy Rajagopal Reddy of the INC won the seat in the 2018 Assembly election.

Komatireddy Raj Gopal Reddy of Indian National Congress won the seat for the first time in the 2023 Assembly election.

== Mandals ==
The Assembly Constituency presently comprises the following Mandals:

Mandal	Districts
Munugode	Nalgonda
Chandur	Nalgonda
Marriguda	Nalgonda
Samsthan Narayanapur	Yadadri Bhuvanagiri
Nampally	Nalgonda
Choutuppal	Yadadri Bhuvanagiri
Ghatuppal	Nalgonda

== Members of Legislative Assembly ==
Year	Name	Political party
Andhra Pradesh
1967	Palvai Govardhan Reddy	Indian National Congress
1972	Palvai Govardhan Reddy	Indian National Congress
1978	Palvai Govardhan Reddy	Indian National Congress
1983	Palvai Govardhan Reddy	Indian National Congress
1985	Vujjini Narayana Rao	Communist Party of India
1989	Vujjini Narayana Rao	Communist Party of India
1994	Vujjini Narayana Rao	Communist Party of India
1999	Palvai Govardhan Reddy	Indian National Congress
2004	Palla Venkat Reddy	Communist Party of India
2009	Vujjini Yadagiri Rao	Communist Party of India
Telangana
2014	Kusukuntla Prabhakar Reddy	Telangana Rashtra Samithi
2018	Komatireddy Rajagopal Reddy	Indian National Congress
2022^	Kusukuntla Prabhakar Reddy	Telangana Rashtra Samithi
2023	Komatireddy Rajagopal Reddy	Indian National Congress

== Election results ==
=== Telangana Legislative Assembly election, 2023 ===
Telangana Assembly Elections, 2023: Munugode
Party	Candidate	Votes	%	±%
INC	Komatireddy Rajagopal Reddy	119,624	51.21	
TRS	Kusukuntla Prabhakar Reddy	79,034	33.83	
BJP	Chelamalla Krishna Reddy	22,319	9.55	
NOTA	None of the Above	849	0.36	
Majority		40,590	17.38	
Turnout		2,33,608		
INC gain from TRS		Swing		

=== By-election 2022 ===
Telangana Assembly by election, 2022: Munugode
Party	Candidate	Votes	%	±%
TRS	Kusukuntla Prabhakar Reddy	97,006	42.95	+12.82
BJP	Komatireddy Rajagopal Reddy	86,697	38.38	+31.99
INC	Palvai Sravanthi Reddy	23,906	10.58	−39.92
BSP	Andoju Shankara Chary	4,146	1.84	
Independent	K. A. Paul	805	0.35	
NOTA	None of the Above	482	0.21	
Majority		10,309	4.57	
Turnout		2,25,885	93.40	+2.10
TRS gain from INC		Swing		

=== Telangana Legislative Assembly election, 2018 ===
2018 Telangana Legislative Assembly election: Munugode
Party	Candidate	Votes	%	±%
INC	Komatireddy Rajagopal Reddy	96,961	50.51	+50.51
TRS	Kusukuntla Prabhakar Reddy	74,504	30.13	−2.47
BJP	Gangidi Manohar Reddy	12,704	6.39	−12
IND	Manga Venkatesh Kuruma	3,569	1.79	
NOTA	None of the Above	3,086	1.55	
Majority		22,457	17.30	
Turnout		1,98,849	91.30	+8.25
INC gain from TRS		Swing		

=== Telangana Legislative Assembly election, 2014 ===
2014 Telangana Legislative Assembly election: Munugode
Party	Candidate	Votes	%	±%
TRS	Kusukuntla Prabhakar Reddy	69,496	38.13	
Independent	Palvai Sravanthi	27,441	15.97	
BJP	Gangidi Manohar Reddy	27,434	15.97	
CPI	Palla Venkat Reddy	20,952	12.20	
CPI(M)	Surkanti Srinivas Reddy	9,206	5.36	
Majority		38,055	22.22	
Turnout		1,71,811	82.15	
TRS gain from Communist party of India		Swing		

=== Andhra Pradesh Legislative Assembly election, 2009 ===
2009 Andhra Pradesh Legislative Assembly election: Munugode
Party	Candidate	Votes	%	±%
CPI	Vujjini Yadagiri Rao	57,383	34.94	
INC	Palvai Govardhan Reddy	53,789	32.75	
PRP	Taduri Venkat Reddy	29,425	17.92	

== See also ==
- Munugode
- List of constituencies of Telangana Legislative Assembly
