= Palvai =

Palvai (Telugu: పాల్వాయి) is a Telugu surname. Notable people with the given name include:

- Palvai Govardhan Reddy (1936–2017)
- Palvai Harish Babu (born 1981)
- Palvai Sravanthi Reddy (born 1973)
