= Kancharla Bhupal Reddy =

Indian politician

Kancharla Bhupal Reddy (born 1975) is an Indian politician from Telangana state. He is a former member of the Telangana Legislative Assembly from Nalgonda Assembly constituency in Nalgonda district representing the Telangana Rashtra Samithi.

== Early life and education ==
Reddy is from Urumadla village, near Chityala, Nalgonda district, Telangana state. He is the son of the late Malla Reddy. He completed his Intermediate at Ravi College, Chityala village in 1993 and later did B. Com. at Nizam College, Hyderabad and passed out in 1996. He declared assets worth Rs.20 crore in his affidavit to the Election Commission of India.

== Career ==
Reddy won the Nalgonda Assembly constituency in the 2018 Telangana Legislative Assembly election representing the Telangana Rashra Samithi. He polled 98,792 votes and defeated his nearest rival, Komatireddy Venkat Reddy of the Indian National Congress, by a margin of 23,698 votes. However, he lost to Venkat Reddy of the Congress in the next election. In 2023, he could only garner 53,073 votes and lost by a margin of 54,332 votes in the 2023 Telangana Legislative Assembly election.
