= Uma Madhava Reddy =

Indian politician

Member of Legislative Assembly United Andhra Pradesh
- In office 2000–2014
- Preceded by: Alimineti Madhava Reddy
- Succeeded by: Pailla Shekar Reddy
- Constituency: Bhongir

Personal details
- Party: Telangana Rashtra Samithi
- Other political affiliations: Telugu Desam Party (2000–2017)
- Spouse: Alimineti Madhava Reddy (died 2000)
- Children: 1

Alimineti Uma Madhava Reddy is an Indian politician from the state of Telangana. She served as a cabinet minister in the second N. Chandrababu Naidu ministry and was the Member of the Legislative Assembly (MLA) from Bhongir Assembly constituency representing the Telugu Desam Party. Currently, she is a member of Telangana Rashtra Samithi.

== Early life ==
Uma Madhava Reddy was married to Alimineti Madhava Reddy, former MLA from Bhongir constituency. They have a son, Sandeep Reddy, who is also a politician.

== Political career ==
Reddy's husband Madhava Reddy was killed by Peoples War Group in March 2000. Post his death, she entered politics by contesting the now-vacant Bhongir constituency by-polls representing the Telugu Desam Party (TDP) and won as the MLA in May. Soon after in November, she was made a cabinet minister by the then Chief Minister of Andhra Pradesh N. Chandrababu Naidu.

She later contested the 2004 and 2009 Andhra Pradesh Assembly elections from TDP and won as the MLA from Bhongir constituency. She lost the 2014 election to Pailla Shekar Reddy of Telangana Rashtra Samithi (TRS).

In December 2017, she, along with her son, joined TRS.
