= Thungathurthi Assembly constituency =

Constituency of the Telangana legislative assembly in India

Coordinates: 17.41°N 79.59°E

Thungathurthi
- Constituency No. 96 for the Telangana Legislative Assembly
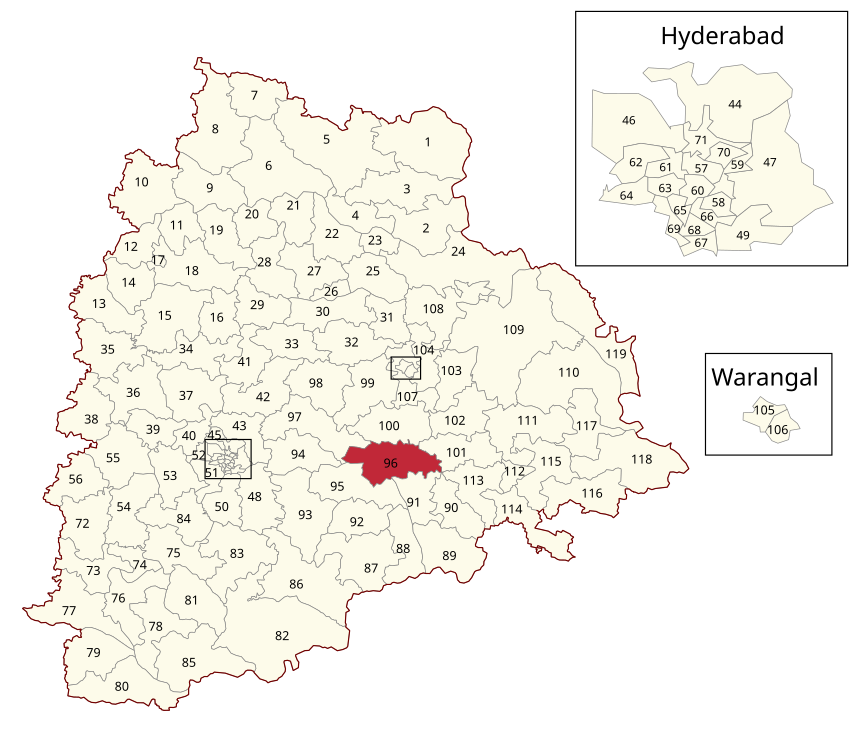
- Location of Thungathurthi Assembly constituency within Telangana

Constituency details
- Country: India
- Region: South India
- State: Telangana
- District: Suryapet
- Lok Sabha constituency: Bhongir
- Established: 1967
- Total electors: 2,35,349
- Reservation: SC

Member of Legislative Assembly
- 3rd Telangana Legislative Assembly
- Incumbent Mandula Samuel
- Party: Indian National Congress
- Elected year: 2023

Thungathurthi Assembly constituency is a SC (Scheduled Caste) reserved constituency of the Telangana Legislative Assembly, India. It is one of four constituencies in Suryapet district. It is 42 km far away from the district headquarters Suryapet.

Mandula Samel of Indian National Congress is representing the constituency for the first time.

== Mandals ==
The Thungathurthy Assembly Constituency presently comprises the following Mandals:

| Mandal | Districts |
|---|---|
| Thungathurthi | Suryapet |
| Maddirala | Suryapet |
| Nagaram | Suryapet |
| Thirumalagiri | Suryapet |
| Noothankal | Suryapet |
| Jajireddigudem | Suryapet |
| Shaligowraram | Nalgonda |
| Mothkur | Yadadri Bhuvanagiri |
| Addagudur | Yadadri Bhuvanagiri |

== Members of Legislative Assembly ==
| Year | MLA | Party |
|---|---|---|
| 1967 | B. Narayana Reddy | Communist Party of India |
| 1972 | Guruganti Venkat Narsaiah | Independent politician |
| 1978 | Mallu Swarajyam | Communist Party of India |
| 1983 | Mallu Swarajyam | Communist Party of India |
| 1985 | Ramreddy Damodar Reddy | Indian National Congress |
| 1989 | Ramreddy Damodar Reddy | Indian National Congress |
| 1994 | Ramreddy Damodar Reddy | Independent politician |
| 1999 | Sankineni Venkateswar Rao | Telugu Desam Party |
| 2004 | Ramreddy Damodar Reddy | Indian National Congress |
| 2009 | Mothukupalli Narsimhulu | Telugu Desam Party |
| 2014 | Gadari Kishore | Telangana Rashtra Samithi |
| 2018 | Gadari Kishore | Telangana Rashtra Samithi |
| 2023 | Mandula Samuel | Indian National Congress |

== Election results ==
=== 2023 ===
2023 Telangana Legislative Assembly election: Thungathurthi
| Party | Candidate | Votes | % | ±% |
|---|---|---|---|---|
| INC | Mandula Samuel | 129,535 | | |
| BRS | Gadari Kishore | 78,441 | | |
| BJP | Kadiyam Ramachandraiah | 4,412 | | |
| NOTA | None of the above | | | |
| Majority | | 51,094 | | |
| Turnout | | 2,25,170 | | |
| INC gain from TRS | | Swing | | |

=== 2018 ===
2018 Telangana Legislative Assembly election: Thungathurthi
| Party | Candidate | Votes | % | ±% |
|---|---|---|---|---|
| TRS | Gadari Kishore | 90,857 | 45.47% | |
| INC | Addanki Dayakar | 89,010 | 44.54% | |
| Independent | Bade Anil | 3,729 | 1.87% | |
| BJP | Ramachandraiah Kadiyam | 3,222 | 1.61% | |
| NOTA | None of the Above | 1,392 | 0.70% | |
| Majority | | 1,847 | | |
| Turnout | | 1,99,822 | 86.33% | |
| TRS hold | | Swing | | |

=== 2014 ===
2014 Telangana Legislative Assembly election: Thungathurthi
| Party | Candidate | Votes | % | ±% |
|---|---|---|---|---|
| TRS | Gadari Kishore | 64,382 | 37.1% | |
| INC | Addanki Dayakar | 62,003 | 35.7% | |
| TDP | Palvai Rajani Kumari | 31,612 | 18.2% | |
| Independent | Palvai Venu | 6,142 | 3.5% | |
| Majority | | 2,379 | 1.4%) | |
| Turnout | | 1,74,462 | 78.1% | |
| TRS gain from TDP | | Swing | | |

== See also ==
- Thungathurthi
- List of constituencies of Telangana Legislative Assembly
