= Palvai Sravanthi Reddy =

Indian politician (born 1973)

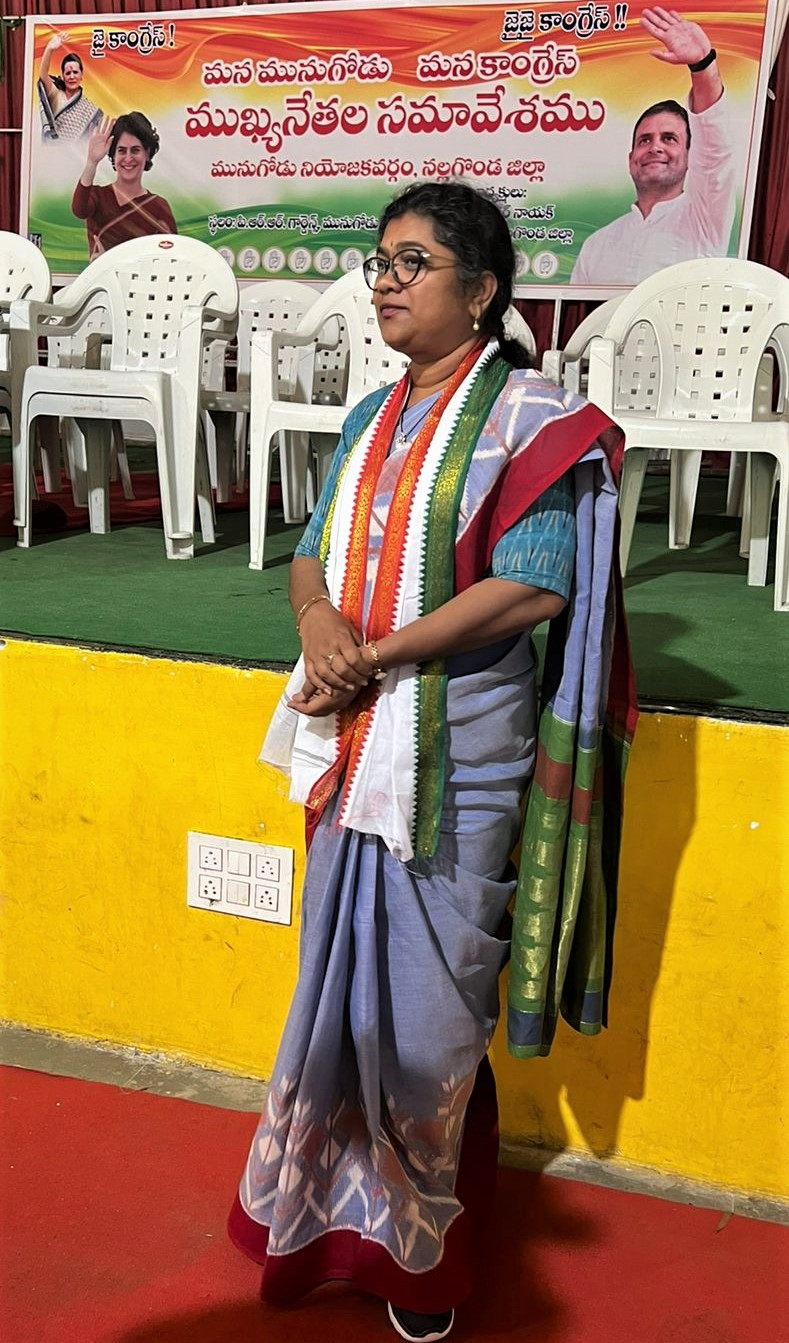

Personal details
- Born: 18 April 1973 (age 52) Idikuda, Nalgonda district
- Party: Bharat Rashtra Samithi

Palvai Sravanthi Reddy (born 18 April 1973) is an Indian politician from the state of Telangana . She is a member of the Bharat Rashtra Samithi party from the Munugode Assembly constituency. Sravanthi Reddy is the daughter of former Minister and MLA Palvai Govardhan Reddy, who was elected to the Andhra Pradesh Legislative Assembly for five terms between 1967 and 1999. Considered close to the Gandhi family, he was a Rajya Sabha member during his sudden demise.

== Early life and education ==
Palvai Sravanthi Reddy was born in Idikuda village, Chandur Mandal in Nalgonda district. She has a dual postgraduate degree in law and management.

== Political career ==
She is an AICC member and a practising advocate at the Telangana High Court. She canvassed for her father Palvai Govardhan Reddy for the first time in the year 1994. Her active political career was in 1999 when she served as a campaign manager for her father when he was contesting from Munugode. She has been a PCC member for more than 20 years and an AICC member since 2005. She had contested the 2014 assembly elections in Telangana, as an independent candidate and stood second with 27,441 votes by defeating BJP candidate G Manohar Reddy who was relegated to the third place, followed by CPI and CPM candidates who secured fourth and fifth places in the election.

Congress president Smt. Sonia Gandhi approved the candidature of Palvai Sravanthi Reddy on September 9, 2022 for the upcoming Munugode by-election. This constituency in Nalgonda district has fallen vacant after the sitting Congress MLA Komatireddy Rajagopal Reddy moved to the BJP. She will be soon contesting against former MLA Komatireddy Rajagopal Reddy, who is the official BJP candidate for this by-election.
