= Pailla Shekar Reddy =

Indian politician

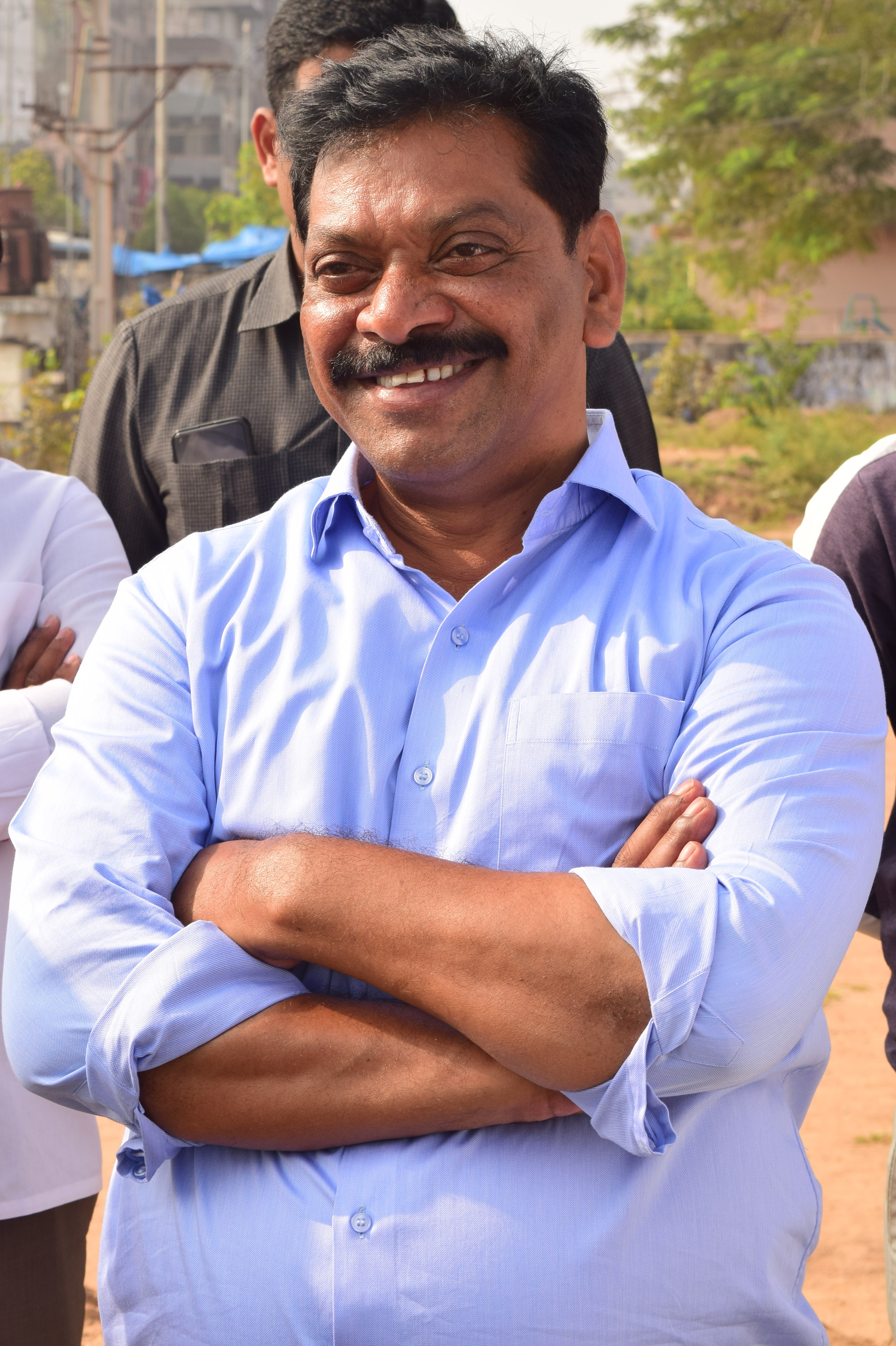

Member of Telangana Legislative Assembly from Bhongir
- In office 2 June 2014 – 3 December 2023
- Preceded by: Kumbam Anil Kumar Reddy
- Succeeded by: Kumbam Anil Kumar Reddy
- Constituency: Bhongir, Telangana

Personal details
- Born: 1 January 1968 (age 58) Nancharipet village, Yadadri Bhuvanagiri district, Telangana.
- Party: Telangana Rashtra Samithi
- Education: Osmania University

Pailla Shekar Reddy (born 1968) is an Indian politician affiliated with the Telangana Rashtra Samithi. He won from Bhongir constituency in Yadadri Bhuvanagiri district in 2014 general elections. He belongs to Telangana Rashtra Samithi and is a member of its Politburo.

== Early life ==
Shekar Reddy was born in Kadireniguda Athmakur Mandal of Yadadri Bhuvanagiri district to Pailla Ram Reddy, a small farmer. He completed his Diploma in Civil engineering, SES SN Murthy Polytechnic College, Khammam, Osmania University.

== Career ==
He was a real estate developer in Hyderabad and Bangalore before entering politics.

=== Politics ===
He won in 2014 General Elections as MLA from Bhongir Assembly Constituency in Telangana state. He received 54,686 votes and defeated his nearest rival Jitta Balakrishna Reddy of YTP by 15,416 votes. The Bhongir constituency has vested with TDP since 1985 when Alimineti Madhava Reddy and later his wife have been representing the constituency.

=== Philanthropy ===
He has provided clean drinking water systems across Nalgonda district, which is notorious for his fluoride contamination.

== Personal life ==
He is married and had one daughter and one son.
