= Kusukuntla Prabhakar Reddy =

Indian politician

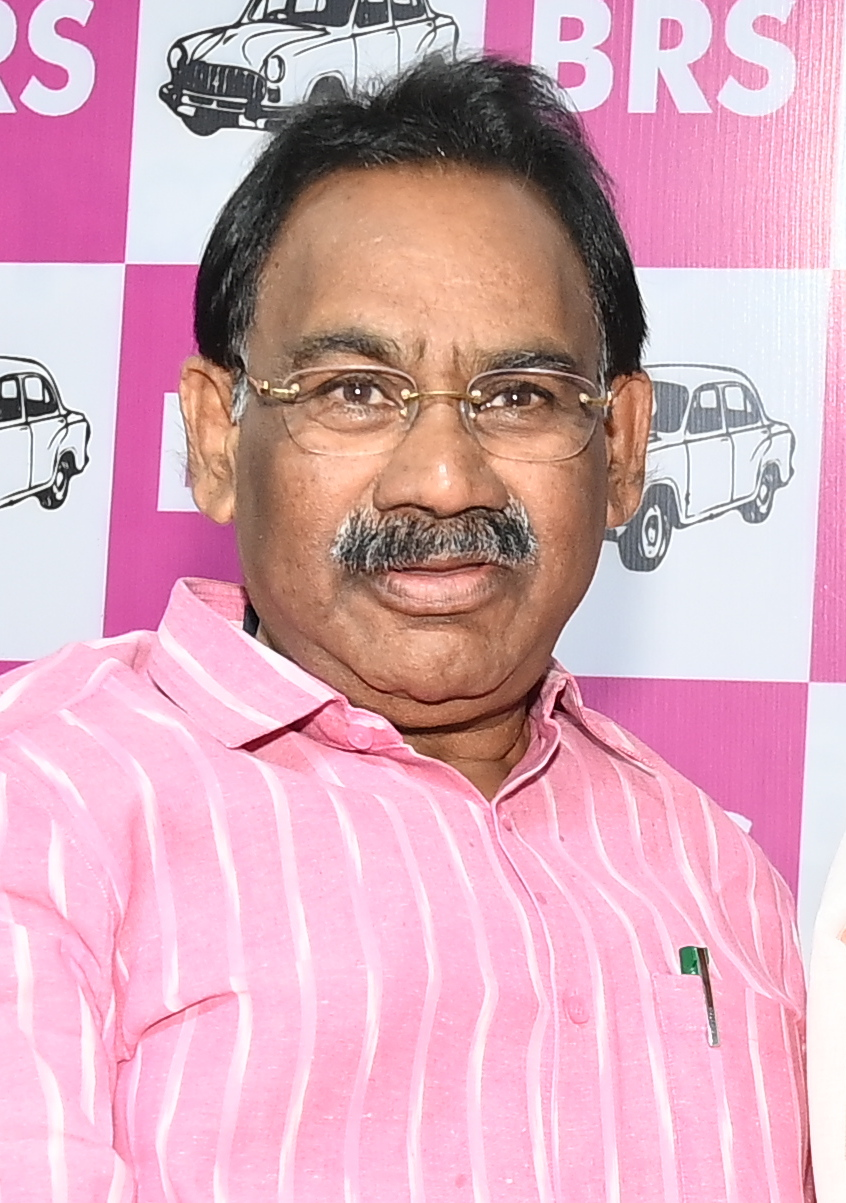

Member of Telangana Legislative Assembly
- In office 6 November 2022 – 6 December 2023
- Preceded by: Komatireddy Raj Gopal Reddy
- Succeeded by: Komatireddy Raj Gopal Reddy
- Constituency: Munugode
- In office 2 June 2014 – 11 December 2018
- Preceded by: Vujjini Yadagiri Rao
- Succeeded by: Komatireddy Raj Gopal Reddy
- Constituency: Munugode

Personal details
- Born: 27 January 1960 (age 66) Telangana
- Spouse: Aruna

Kusukuntla Prabhakar Reddy (born 1965) is an Indian politician and the current member of the legislative assembly representing Munugode (Assembly constituency). He belongs to Indian National Congress.

== Early life ==
He was born in Sarvail village in Samsthan Narayanpur, Nalgonda district, Telangana to Kamalamma and Janga Reddy, a small farmer. He did his B.Ed. from Viveka Vardhini College, Hyderabad and B.Sc. from Nagarjuna College, Nalgonda.

== Career ==
He started as a teacher and started educational institution and was successful before entering politics.

=== Political career ===
He joined Telangana Rashtra Samithi in 2002, with his mentor Kallem Yadagiri Reddy, a leading activist for the statehood. He fought for Telangana statehood, was at the forefront during the agitation in Munugode for the statehood. He became very popular with the people for the effort. His mother was a victim of fluorosis, the region rife with such victims.

=== As MLA ===
He won as an MLA from Munugode with a huge margin of 38,055 votes majority, highest in Nalgonda District. He worked actively to bring benefits of flagship programs like Mission Kakatiya, to end the water epidemic, fluorosis through Mission Bhagiratha, health, education etc. to the people of Munugode.

In 2018 Telangana assembly elections, he once again contested as an MLA from TRS ticket and was defeated by Komatireddy Rajagopal Reddy of Indian National Congress with a huge margin of 22,552 votes.

He was the TRS Party contestant for the Munugode By-Elections 2022, arising due to the resignation of sitting MLA Komatireddy Rajagopal Reddy from the office.

TRS has won the by-election in Telangana's Munugode by over 10,000 votes with Alliance of CPI and CPM. The TRS candidate, K Prabhakar Reddy, did face a tough fight from the BJP's K Rajagopal Reddy.

== Personal life ==
He is married to Aruna. They have a son and a daughter.
