= Nalgonda Assembly constituency =

Constituency of the Telangana legislative assembly in India

Coordinates: 17.06°N 79.27°E

Nalgonda
- Constituency No. 92 for the Telangana Legislative Assembly
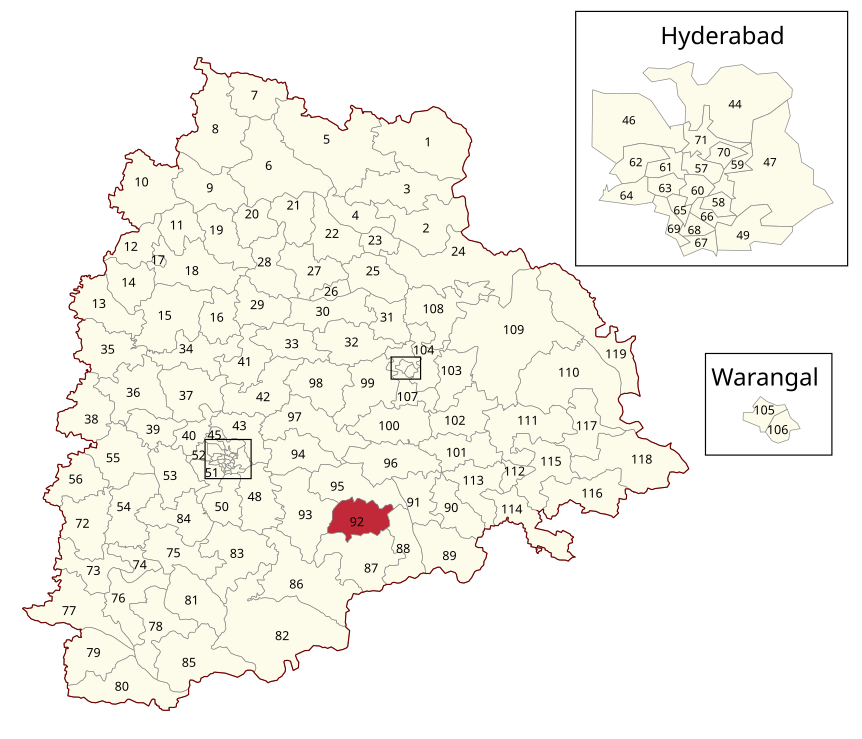
- Location of Nalgonda Assembly constituency within Telangana

Constituency details
- Country: India
- Region: South India
- State: Telangana
- District: Nalgonda
- Lok Sabha constituency: Nalgonda
- Established: 1951
- Total electors: 2,21,836
- Reservation: None

Member of Legislative Assembly
- 3rd Telangana Legislative Assembly
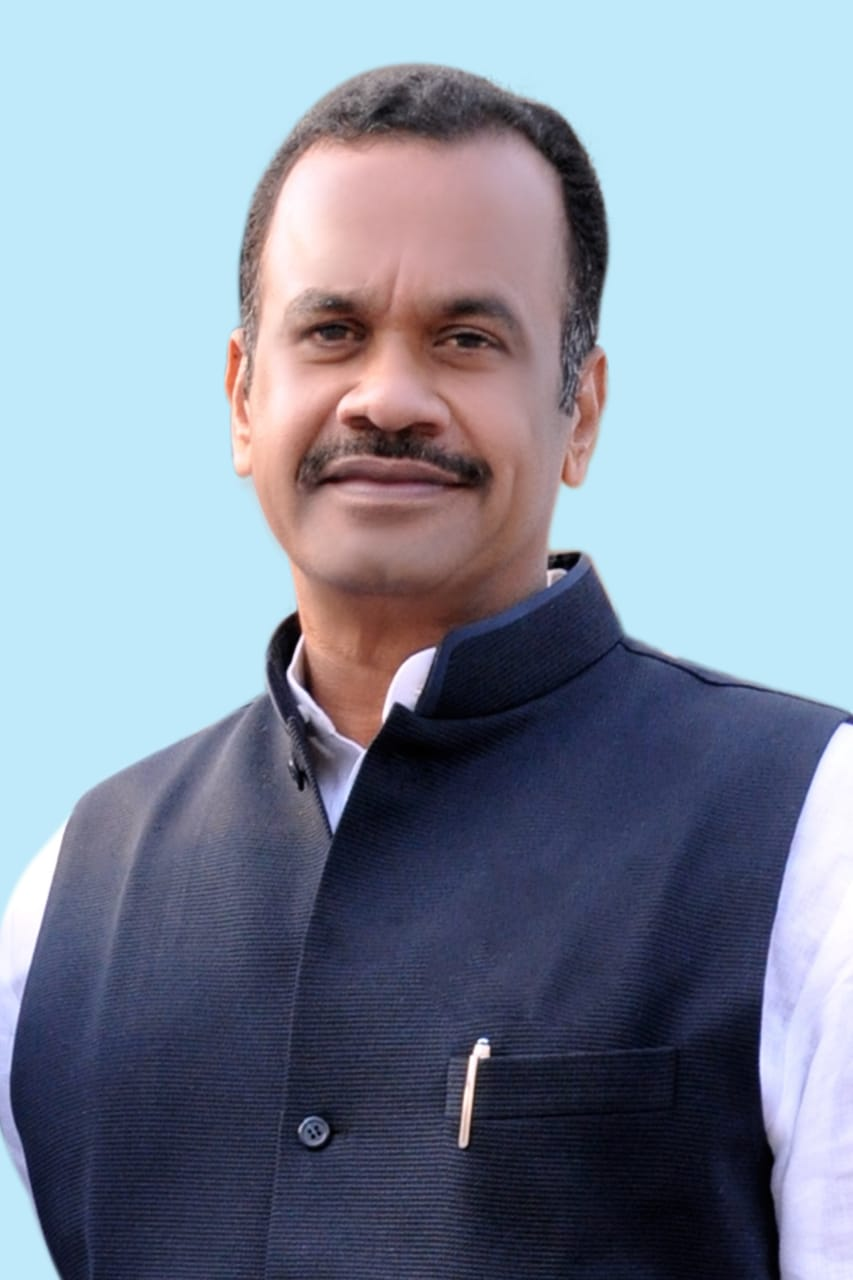
- Incumbent Komatireddy Venkat Reddy
- Party: Indian National Congress
- Elected year: 2023

Nalgonda Assembly constituency is a constituency of the Telangana Legislative Assembly, India. It is one of 12 constituencies in Nalgonda district. It is part of Nalgonda Lok Sabha constituency.

Komatireddy Venkat Reddy of Indian National Congress won the seat in December 2023 Assembly election beating Kancharla Bhupal Reddy of Bharat Rashtra Samithi.

== Mandals ==
Nalgonda Assembly Constituency comprises the following Mandals:

Mandal
Nalgonda
Thipparthy
Kanagal
Madugulapally

== Members of the Legislative Assembly ==
Year	Name	Party
Hyderabad
1952 (Gen.)	Katta Ram Reddy	People's Democratic Front
1952 (Res.)	P. Laxmayya	People's Democratic Front
United Andhra Pradesh
1957	Venkatreddy	People's Democratic Front
1962	Bommagani Dharmabhiksham	Communist Party of India
1967	Chakilam Srinivasa Rao	Indian National Congress
1972	Chakilam Srinivasa Rao	Indian National Congress
1978	Gutha Mohan Reddy	Indian National Congress
1983	Gutha Mohan Reddy	Telugu Desam Party
1985	N. T. Rama Rao	Telugu Desam Party
1985★	Gaddam Rudrama Devi	Telugu Desam Party
1989	Malreddy Raghuma Reddy	Telugu Desam Party
1994	Nandyala Narsimha Reddy	Communist Party of India
1999	Komatireddy Venkat Reddy	Indian National Congress
2004	Komatireddy Venkat Reddy	Indian National Congress
2009	Komatireddy Venkat Reddy	Indian National Congress
Telangana Legislative Assembly
2014	Komatireddy Venkat Reddy	Indian National Congress
2018	Kancharla Bhupal Reddy	Telangana Rashtra Samithi
2023	Komatireddy Venkat Reddy	Indian National Congress

★by-lection

== Election results ==
=== Telangana Legislative Assembly election, 2023 ===
Telangana Assembly Elections, 2023: Nalgonda (Assembly constituency)
Party	Candidate	Votes	%	±%
INC	Komatireddy Venkat Reddy	107,405	52.64	
BRS	Kancharla Bhupal Reddy	53,073	26.01	
AIFB	Pilli Rama Raju Yadav	27,096	13.28	
BJP	Madagani Srinivas Goud	7,828	3.83	
CPI(M)	Mudireddy Sudhakar Reddy	1,439	0.71	
Independent	Gandikota Venkat Laxman	977	0.48	
NOTA	None of the Above	901	0.44	
Majority		54,332	26.63	
Turnout		2,04,027		
INC gain from BRS		Swing		

=== Telangana Legislative Assembly election, 2018 ===
2018 Telangana Legislative Assembly election: Nalgonda
Party	Candidate	Votes	%	±%
TRS	Kancharla Bhupal Reddy	98,792	53.22%	
INC	Komatireddy Venkat Reddy	75,094	40.46%	
BJP	Sriramoju Shanmukha Chary	1,916	1.03%	
Independent	Polishetty Venkateshwarlu	2,932	1.58%	
NOTA	None of the Above	1,276	0.69%	
Majority		23,698	10.68%	
Turnout		1,85,618	85.59%	
TRS gain from INC		Swing		

=== Telangana Legislative Assembly election, 2014 ===
Telangana Assembly Elections, 2014: Nalgonda (Assembly constituency)
Party	Candidate	Votes	%	±%
INC	Komatireddy Venkat Reddy	60,774	36.6%	
TDP	Kancharla Bhupal Reddy	50,227	30.3%	
TRS	Dubbaka Narsimha Reddy	15,606	12.5%	
CPI(M)	Syed Hasham	10,332	6.2%	
Majority		10,547		
Turnout		1,66,194	74.9%	
INC hold		Swing		

=== Andhra Pradesh Legislative Assembly election, 2009 ===
Andhra Pradesh Assembly Elections, 2009: Nalgonda (Assembly constituency)
Party	Candidate	Votes	%	±%
INC	Komatireddy Venkat Reddy	60,665	41.03%	
CPI(M)	Nandyala Narsimha Reddy	52,288	35.36%	
PRP	Dubbaka Narsimha Reddy	22,017	14.89%	

== See also ==
- Warangal
- List of constituencies of Telangana Legislative Assembly
