= Vujjini Yadagiri Rao =

Indian politician

Vujjini Yadagiri Rao (born 1956) is an Indian politician from Andhra Pradesh. He is a former three time member of the Andhra Pradesh Legislative Assembly from the Munugode Assembly constituency in Nalgonda district representing the Communist Party of India in 2009.

== Early life ==
Rao is from Gadia Gouraram, Chinthapalli mandal, Nalgonda district, Andhra Pradesh. His is the son of the late Vujjini Narayana Rao, a three time MLA from Munugode. He declared assets worth Rs.1 crore in his affidavit to the Election Commission of India.

== Career ==
Rao won the Munugode Assembly constituency in the 2009 Andhra Pradesh Legislative Assembly election representing the Communist Party of India. He polled 57,383 votes and defeated his nearest rival, Goverdhan Reddy Palvai of the Indian Natiional Congress, by 3,594 votes.
