= Alimineti Madhava Reddy =

Indian politician (1949–2000)

Minister of Panchayati Raj & Rural Development Government of United Andhra Pradesh
- In office 11 October 1999 – 7 March 2000
- Governor: C. Rangarajan
- Chief Minister: N. Chandrababu Naidu
- Preceded by: Kodela Siva Prasada Rao
- Succeeded by: P. Rama Subba Reddy

Minister of Home, Jails, Fire Services, NCC, Sainik Welfare and Cinematography Government of United Andhra Pradesh
- In office 1 September 1995 – 11 October 1999
- Governor: ▪︎ Krishan Kant; ▪︎ C. Rangarajan
- Chief Minister: N. Chandrababu Naidu
- Preceded by: P. Indra Reddy
- Succeeded by: Tulla Devender Goud

Minister of Health & Medical Education Government of United Andhra Pradesh
- In office 12 December 1994 – 1 September 1995
- Governor: Krishna Kant
- Chief Minister: N. T. Rama Rao
- Succeeded by: K. Pratibha Bharati

Member of Legislative Assembly United Andhra Pradesh
- In office 1985–2000
- Preceded by: Kommidi Narasimha Reddy
- Succeeded by: Uma Madhava Reddy
- Constituency: Bhongir

Personal details
- Born: 1 May 1949 Nalgonda district, Andhra Pradesh (now in Telangana), India
- Died: 7 March 2000 (aged 51) Ghatkesar, Andhra Pradesh (now in Telangana), India
- Cause of death: Landmine blast
- Party: Telugu Desam Party
- Spouse: Uma Madhava Reddy
- Children: alimineti Sandeep

Alimineti Madhava Reddy (28 February 1949 – 7 March 2000) was an Indian politician from the state of Andhra Pradesh. He was elected four times to the Andhra Pradesh Legislative Assembly from Bhongir constituency representing the Telugu Desam Party (TDP).

== Early life and education ==
Alimineti Madhava Reddy was born to Narsa Reddy and Lakshmamma. He hailed from the erstwhile Nalgonda district in present-day Telangana. He graduated from Osmania University in 1974 as B.E. Electrical engineer. He married Uma Devi. They have a son, Alimineti Sandeep and two daughters Srujana and Swetha. Uma Devi and Alimineti Sandeep are politicians as well.

== Political career ==
Reddy joined Telugu Desam Party in 1984 and was elected to the Andhra Pradesh Legislative Assembly from Bhongir constituency representing TDP. He won the 1985, 1989, 1994 and 1999 elections.

Reddy held several portfolios in the state cabinet, first under N. T. Rama Rao and then under N. Chandrababu Naidu. He served as the Minister for Health & Medical Education for 9 months (from December 1994 to August 1995) in N.T. Rama Rao's cabinet. He served as the home minister for 4 years, from 1995 to 1999. He was the first to serve as a home minister from erstwhile Nalgonda district and as a minister for Panchayat Raj & Rural Development (from 11 October 1999 until his death).

During his home ministership, Reddy was outspoken against the Naxalite–Maoist insurgency. He made the ban on Peoples War Group (PWG) to be reimposed, which was lifted by Rama Rao when he was the chief minister. The killings of the Naxalites increased. Reddy aggressively campaigned to help those who wish to surrender. He visited places where major attacks were taking place disregarding the warnings about threats, in order to show the support for the police on duty. This ended with Reddy on top of the PWG's hit list.

== Death ==
Reddy was killed in a landmine blast triggered by the outlawed People's War Group of Naxalites near Ghatkesar on 7 March 2000 around 11 PM IST. The security protocol of Reddy was found to be inadequately enforced. The government did not take action against the officials responsible for his security.

Reddy's wife, Uma Madhava Reddy, who entered politics after his death, won the by-polls to the Bhongir constituency and served as a cabinet minister in Naidu's cabinet. The Srisailam Left Bank Canal, an irrigation project located in Nalgonda district in Telangana, was renamed as Alimineti Madhava Reddy Project after his death.
