= Kommidi Narasimha Reddy =

Indian politician (1943–2026)

Ex. MLA
- In office 1978–1985
- Constituency: Bhongir, Telangana

Personal details
- Born: 10 September 1943 Brhamanapally, Nalgonda district, Hyderabad State, India
- Died: 7 July 2026 (aged 82) Hyderabad, Telangana, India
- Party: Indian National Congress
- Spouse: Sukanya
- Children: 2 sons and 2 daughters

Kommidi Narasimha Reddy (10 September 1943 – 7 July 2026), also known as Bhudhan Reddy, was an Indian politician affiliated with the Indian National Congress. He won from Bhongir constituency, Nalgonda two times in 1978 and 1983 general elections. Reddy gave 300 acres of land to poor people. He died on 7 July 2026, at the age of 82.
