= Bhongir Assembly constituency =

Constituency of the Telangana legislative assembly in India

Coordinates: 17.51°N 78.89°E

Bhongir
- Constituency No. 94 for the Telangana Legislative Assembly
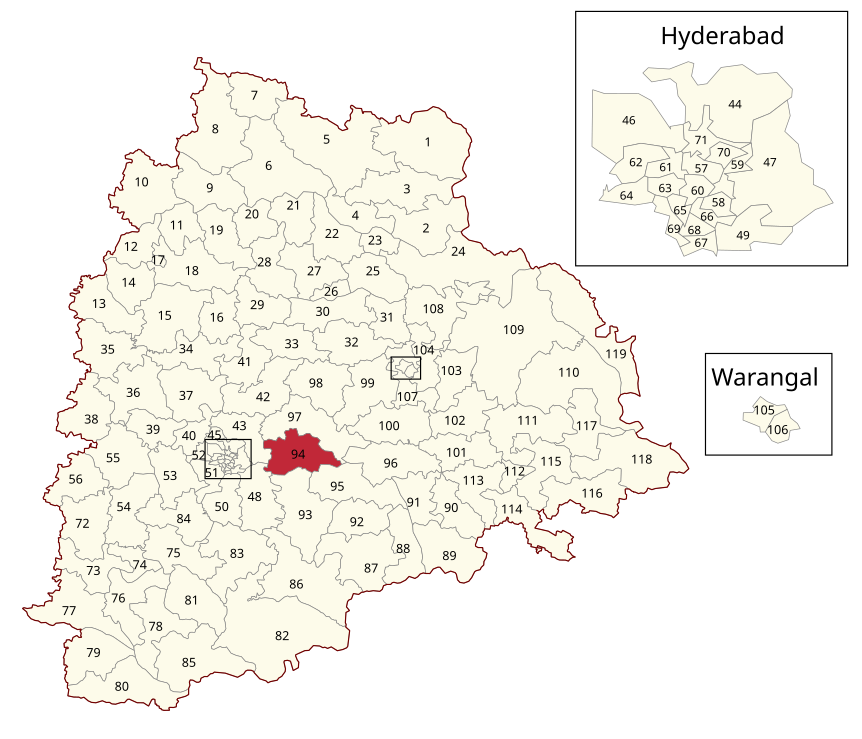
- Location of Bhongir Assembly constituency within Telangana

Constituency details
- Country: India
- Region: South India
- State: Telangana
- District: Yadadri Bhuvanagiri
- Lok Sabha constituency: Bhongir
- Established: 1951
- Total electors: 1,86,607
- Reservation: None

Member of Legislative Assembly
- 3rd Telangana Legislative Assembly
- Incumbent Kumbam Anil Kumar Reddy
- Party: Indian National Congress
- Elected year: 2023

Bhongir Assembly constituency is a constituency of the Telangana Legislative Assembly, India. It is one among 12 constituencies in the Erstwhile Nalgonda district. It is part of Bhongir Lok Sabha constituency.

Pailla Shekar Reddy of Telangana Rashtra Samithi won the seat for the first time in 2014 Assembly election and for a second time in the 2018 Assembly election. Kumbam Anil Kumar Reddy of Indian National Congress won the seat in the 2023 Assembly election.

== Mandals ==
The Assembly Constituency presently comprises the following Mandals:

Mandal
Bhongir
Bibinagar
Bhoodan Pochampally
Valigonda

== Members of the Legislative Assembly ==
Year	Winner	Party
Hyderabad State
1952	Raavi Narayana Reddy	People's Democratic Front
1952 (by-election)	Goka Ramalingam	Indian National Congress
Andhra Pradesh
1957	Raavi Narayana Reddy	People's Democratic Front
1962	Arutla Ramchandra Reddy	Communist Party of India
1967	Konda Laxman Bapuji	Indian National Congress
1972	Konda Laxman Bapuji	Indian National Congress
1978	Kommidi Narasimha Reddy	Indian National Congress
1983	Kommidi Narasimha Reddy	Indian National Congress
1985	Alimineti Madhava Reddy	Telugu Desam Party
1989	Alimineti Madhava Reddy	Telugu Desam Party
1994	Alimineti Madhava Reddy	Telugu Desam Party
1999	Alimineti Madhava Reddy	Telugu Desam Party
2000 (by-election)	Uma Madhava Reddy	Telugu Desam Party
2004	Uma Madhava Reddy	Telugu Desam Party
2009	Uma Madhava Reddy	Telugu Desam Party
Telangana
2014	Pailla Shekar Reddy	Telangana Rashtra Samithi
2018	Pailla Shekar Reddy	Telangana Rashtra Samithi
2023	Kumbam Anil Kumar Reddy	Indian National Congress

== Election results ==
=== Telangana Legislative Assembly election, 2023 ===
2023 Telangana Legislative Assembly election: Bhongir
Party	Candidate	Votes	%	±%
INC	Kumbam Anil Kumar Reddy	102,742	52.40	
BRS	Pailla Shekar Reddy	76,541	39.04	
BJP	Gudur Narayana Reddy	9,200	4.69	
CPI(M)	Kondamadugu Narasimha	1,315	0.67	
NOTA	Nota	882	0.45	
Majority		26,201	13.36	
Turnout		1,96,099	90.37	
INC gain from BRS		Swing		

=== Telangana Legislative Assembly election, 2018 ===
2018 Telangana Legislative Assembly election: Bhongir
Party	Candidate	Votes	%	±%
TRS	Pailla Shekar Reddy	85,476	49.34	
INC	Kumbam Anil Kumar Reddy	61,413	35.45	
BJP	Jitta Balakrishna Reddy	13,427	7.75	
NOTA	None of the Above	1,347	0.78	
Majority		24,063	13.99	
Turnout		1,73,231	90.77	
TRS gain from INC		Swing	10.0%	

=== Telangana Legislative Assembly election, 2014 ===
2014 Telangana Legislative Assembly election: Bhongir
Party	Candidate	Votes	%	±%
TRS	Pailla Shekar Reddy	54,686	34.60%	
Independent	Jitta Bala Krishna Reddy	39,270	24.8%	
INC	Pothamshetty Venkateshwarulu	33,560	21.20%	
TDP	Uma Madhava Reddy	24,569	15.5%	
Majority		15,416	9.7%	
Turnout		1,58,204	84.8%	
TRS gain from TDP		Swing		

== See also ==
- Bhongir
- List of constituencies of Telangana Legislative Assembly
