= Komatireddy Venkat Reddy =

Indian politician

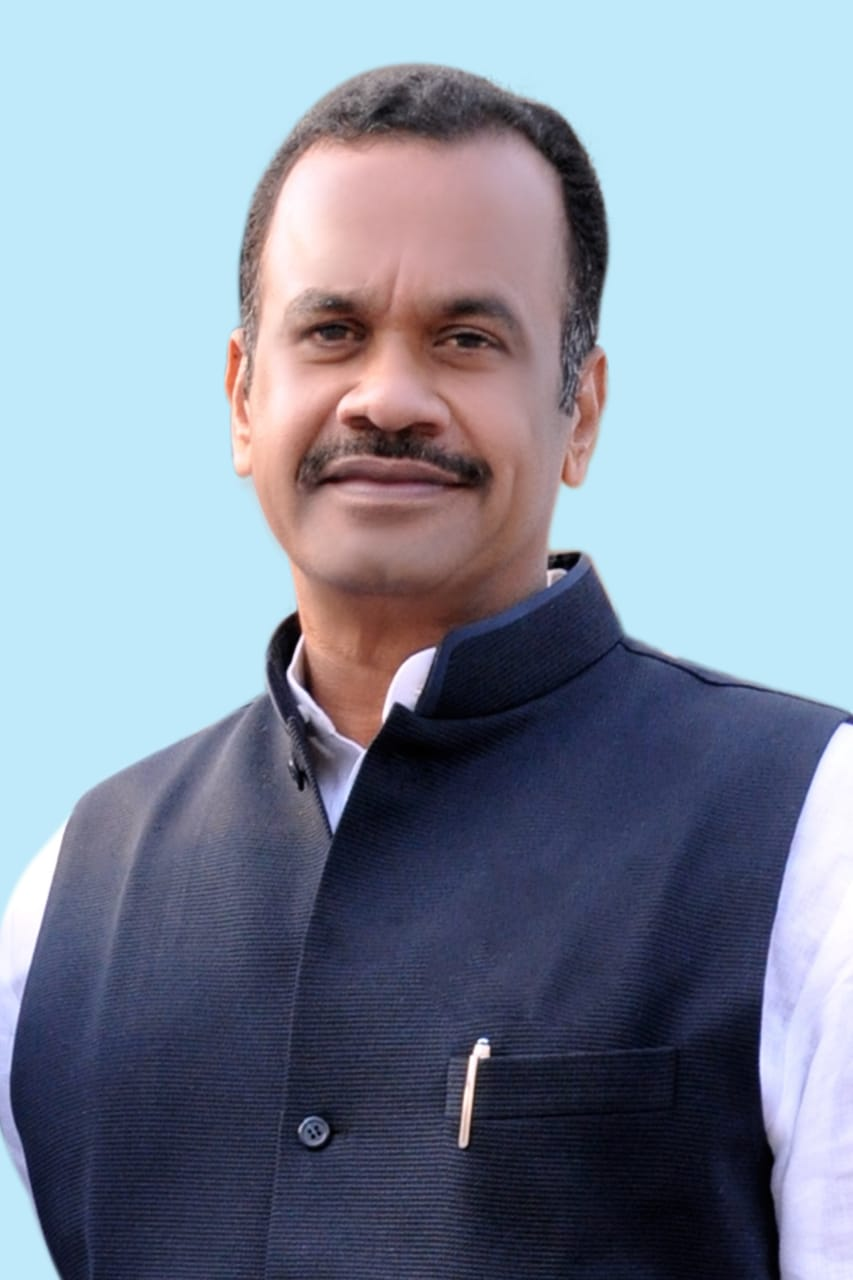
- Reddy in 2023

Minister of Roads, Buildings & Cinematography Government of Telangana
- Incumbent
- Assumed office 7 December 2023
- Governor: Tamilisai Soundararajan (2023-2024); C.P. Radhakrishnan (Additional charge) (2024); Jishnu Dev Varma (2024-2026); Shiv Pratap Shukla ( 2026–present)
- Chief Minister: Anumula Revanth Reddy
- Preceded by: ▪︎ Vemula Prashanth Reddy (Roads & Buildings); ▪︎ Talasani Srinivas Yadav (Cinematography)

Member of Parliament, Lok Sabha
- In office 23 May 2019 – 6 December 2023
- Preceded by: Boora Narsaiah Goud
- Succeeded by: Chamala Kiran Kumar Reddy
- Constituency: Bhuvanagiri, Telangana

Member of Telangana Legislative Assembly
- Incumbent
- Assumed office 9 December 2023
- Preceded by: Kancharla Bhupal Reddy
- Constituency: Nalgonda
- In office 2 June 2014 – 11 December 2018
- Preceded by: Telangana Legislative Assembly Created
- Succeeded by: Kancharla Bhupal Reddy
- Constituency: Nalgonda

Minister of Information Technology, Airports, Port Trust, Natural Gas and Telecommunications Government of Andhra Pradesh
- In office 25 May 2009 – 2 October 2011
- Governor: N. D. Tiwari; E. S. L. Narasimhan
- Chief Minister: Y. S. Rajasekhara Reddy; Konijeti Rosaiah; Nallari Kiran Kumar Reddy
- Preceded by: Mopidevi Venkataramana
- Succeeded by: Ganta Srinivasa Rao

Member of Legislative Assembly Andhra Pradesh
- In office 6 October 1999 – 16 May 2014
- Preceded by: Nandyala Narsimha Reddy
- Succeeded by: Telangana Assembly Created
- Constituency: Nalgonda

Personal details
- Born: 23 May 1965 (age 61) Brahmana Vellemla, Telangana
- Party: Indian National Congress
- Spouse: Smt Komatireddy Sabithamma
- Children: 1
- Parent: Komatireddy Papi Reddy (father)
- Relatives: Komatireddy Raj Gopal Reddy (Brother)

Komatireddy Venkat Reddy (born 23 May 1965) is an Indian politician and currently serves as the cabinet minister of Roads & Buildings and Cinematography in Telangana. He served as a MLA for the Nalgonda Constituency for 20 years consecutively, following which he served as a Member of Parliament of Bhuvanagiri Parliament Constituency from 2019 to 2023.
He joined the Congress Party in 1986 as NSUI District in charge and has worked his way up. He has been the star campaigner of Telangana Pradesh Congress Committee, known for his unwavering participation in the formation of the State of Telangana and some revolutionary development in Nalgonda. He was the Deputy Floor Leader, Telangana Congress Legislative Party.

== Early life and education ==
Komatireddy Venkat Reddy was born on 23 May 1965 as the 8th of the nine children of a farmer, Sri Papi Reddy and Smt.Susheelamma in Brahmana Vellemla village, Narketpally, Nalgonda district, Telangana. Komatireddy Venkat Reddy attended Amarajeevi Potti Sreeramulu High School. He is a notable alumnus of Chaitanya Bharathi Institute of Technology, Hyderabad in 1986 where he pursued Bachelor of Civil Engineering (BE).

== Political career ==
=== Youth politics ===
Right from the inception of his career, Komatireddy Venkat Reddy was actively involved in Youth Politics. He always believed that societal change is unprecedented in its pace, scope and depth of impact and everyone is bound to get into reforming it the right way. During his graduation in 1986, he acted as NSUI District Incharge and brought in new agendas such as educational and university reforms.

Komatireddy won as a candidate from Nalgonda assembly constituency four times, in 1999, 2004, 2009 and 2014. He was a Minister for Information Technology in YS Rajasekhar Reddy's government. He served as minister for ports. In 2019 he was again elected as Member of Parliament from Bhuvanagiri constituency.

Venkat Reddy has held the following positions;

Year	Description
1999	Elected in Assembly elections: Member of Legislative Assembly, MLA; Fight to end Fluorosis - Fought for the heart-wrenching problem of Fluorosis
2004	Elected in Assembly elections: Member of Legislative Assembly, MLA; Facilitated infrastructure development in the constituency.
2009	Elected in Assembly elections: Minister for Information Technology, Sports, Youth, Communications; Minister for Airports, Ports, Natural Gas Industries; Facilitated the increase in Jobs via the inflow of multiple MNCs in Hyderabad; Introduced incentives for badminton players such as Saina Nehwal and others during the Commonwealth Games
2014	Elected in Assembly elections (4th term): Deputy Leader, Indian National Congress Parliamentary Party, Telangana Legislative Assembly; Spoke up against the unjust rule of the TRS Party, and raised many important issues in the state
2019	Elected to 17th Lok Sabha: Member of Parliament, Bhongir; Member, Standing Committee on Coal, Mines and Steel; Member, Consultative Committee, Ministry of Finance (India) and Ministry of Corporate Affairs
2023	Elected in Assembly elections: Minister for Department of Roads & Buildings and Minister for Cinematography

== Election statistics ==
	Year	Contested For	Party	Constituency	Opponent	Votes	Majority	Result	Reference
1	1999	MLA	Indian National Congress	Nalgonda	Nandyala Narsimha Reddy (CPM)	47,332 - 42,882	+4,440	Won	
2	2004	MLA	Indian National Congress	Nalgonda	Gutha Sukender Reddy (TDP)	69,818 - 47,080	+23,787	Won	
3	2009	MLA	Indian National Congress	Nalgonda	Nandyala Narsimha Reddy (CPM)	60,665 - 52,288	+8,377	Won	
4	2014	MLA	Indian National Congress	Nalgonda	Kancharla Bhupal Reddy (IND)	60,744 - 50,227	+10,547	Won	
5	2018	MLA	Indian National Congress	Nalgonda	Kancharla Bhupal Reddy (TRS)	98,792 - 75,094	-23,698	Lost	
6	2019	MP	Indian National Congress	Bhongir	Boora Narasaiah (TRS)	5,32,795 - 5,27,576	+5,219	Won	
7	2023	MLA	Indian National Congress	Nalgonda	Kancharla Bhupal Reddy (BRS)	1,07,405 - 53,073	+54,332	Won	

== Notable achievements ==
Fight to end Fluorosis - Fought for the heart-wrenching problem of Fluorosis (deadly amounts of fluoride mixed in groundwater)- leading to 10,000 residents with crippling diseases. Komatireddy Venkat Reddy took a bottle of fluoride-infected water to the assembly in protest - bringing the issue to the front stage. Went on a hunger strike in March 2003, to demand the completion of the drinking water problem. He organized a march of fluoride victims to the governor’s house. The ruling party, TDP had then announced 177Cr to the Panagal Project to supply drinking water for 112 villages.

In 2004, he was elected for the 2nd term as the MLA of Nalgonda Facilitated infrastructure development in the constituency. Due to his proposals, Govt. sanctioned Rs.2900Cr to the SLBC project to irrigate the drought-prone Nalgonda and Mahbubnagar Districts. Sanctioned funds for the Bramhana Vellemla Project.

He was elected for the 3rd time in 2009, consecutively from Nalgonda; and became a Cabinet Minister of the Andhra Pradesh State. He held the following portfolio’s during his tenure - as an IT, Sports, Youth and TeleCommunications, Airports & Ports, and Natural Gas Cabinet Minister in Andhra Pradesh under the Late Y.S.Rajashekar Reddy’s Government.

As IT Minister - Facilitated the increase in Jobs via the inflow of multiple MNCs in Hyderabad - Second tower of TCS 46 acre campus. As Sports Minister - Introduced incentives for badminton players such as Saina Nehwal and others during the Commonwealth games After re-arrangement of Ministries - Got inducted as the Minister of Ports, Airports, and Natural Gas Industries.

He stood at the forefront of the Telangana Agitation for a Separate State, and also resigned to his Ministry for this purpose.

In 2014, he was elected for the 4th time as Nalgonda MLA in Telangana State. Served as Deputy Floor leader in the Legislative Assembly Spoke up against the unjust rule of the TRS Party, and raised many important issues in the state.

In 2017, he went on a 72-hour hunger strike along with families in Nalgonda, who had lost their loved ones due to the non-availability of medical services, urging then-Chief Minister K Chandrashekar Rao, to keep his promise of sanctioning a medical college to Nalgonda.

In 2019, he was elected to the 17th Lok Sabha as a Congress Party Member of Parliament from Bhongir. He served as a Member of the Standing Committee on Coal, Mines and Steel, Member Consultative Committee, Ministry of Finance (India), and Corporate Affairs.

== Achievements as MP ==
Construction of the newly declared National highway NH 930P: From the junction of Outer Ring Road at Gourelli to Kothagudem conversion of 4 lanes of NH 65 from LB Nagar to Malkapur connecting Hyderabad to Vijayawada. He sanctioned 2 cluster development projects under the National Handloom Development Programme (NHDP) for weavers. Steps were taken to bring medical facilities and related latest equipment for about Rs.970 Cr. for AIIMS hospital in Bibinagar Sanctioning of an indoor sports stadium in Bhongir Town for about Rs.200 Cr.

As a Member of the Standing Committee on Coal and Steel- Steps were taken to benefit save governments exchequer of around Rs.30,000Cr for the work of a selection of Mine Developer cum Operator (MDO) for the development and operation of Naina Coal Mine situated in Odisha state by Singareni Collieries Co.Ltd. by canceling of Initial tenders and later allotting their coal blocks by calling new tenders. Raised 341 questions in Parliament, which is higher in number than any other Parliamentarian in Telangana.

== Telangana agitation ==
In 2011, he went on an indefinite fast in support of the Telangana agitation in Nalgonda. The police forcibly took him to the NIMS hospital as his health deteriorated during the 7th/9th day of his fast he continued his fast in the hospital and refused to take medical treatment. He did not heed the advice of even fellow Telangana Congress leaders to call off his fast, stirring a huge revolution. A large number of Telangana activists visited NIMS and expressed solidarity with the fasting Congress leader, causing the state government and the Congress high command to understand the urgency of the matter. He is the second leader in history to resign from his post after Konda Laxman Bapuji for Telangana. Hence, playing a key role in achieving a Separate Telangana.

He also played a key role in other protests for students’ deaths. Watching young students in Telangana, he tendered his resignation as a minister and continued to fight in the Assembly.

== Philanthropy ==
The Komatireddy Prateek Foundation was established by him in memory of his son Prateek Reddy, who met with an accident on 20 December 2011 on Outer Ring Road in Hyderabad. At a cost of Rs 3.5 crore by the Foundation, he undertook the building of the Prateek Memorial Government Junior College for Boys and Vocational Junior College for Girls in Nalgonda. He operates ambulance services under this organization and runs awareness campaigns for road safety. Every year, Komatireddy Prateek Foundation conducts job mela and provides job opportunities to many unemployed youth in Telangana.
