= Gadari Kishore =

Indian politician (born 1985)

Dr. Gadari Kishore Kumar
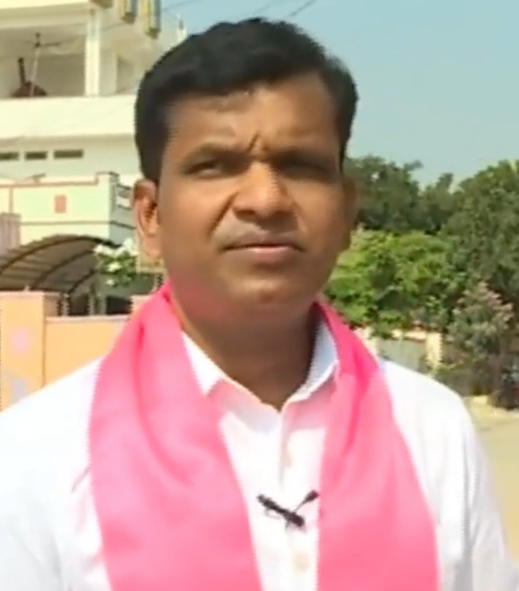

Member of Legislative Assembly
- In office 2014–2023
- Preceded by: Mothukupalli Narsimhulu
- Succeeded by: Mandula Samuel
- Constituency: Thungathurthi

Personal details
- Born: 16 June 1981 (age 44) Thungathurthy, Telangana
- Party: Bharat Rashtra Samithi
- Occupation: Politician

Dr. Gadari Kishore Kumar (born 16 June 1981) is an Indian politician from Telangana. He was representing Thungathurthi Assembly constituency. He belongs to Telangana Rashtra Samithi.

== Early life ==
Dr. Gadari Kishore Kumar was born in Nalgonda in Nalgonda district, Telangana to Maraiah. He attended AP Residential School, Sarvail, Nalgonda from 1990-96. He did his Masters in Journalism and Mass Communication (MCJ) at Osmania University in 2006. He joined to pursue his doctorate in 2010 and received his doctorate in Journalism and Mass Communication in 2017.

He actively participated in Telangana movement as student leader at OUJAC, Osmania University. He is known for his oratorial skills.

== Political career ==
He joined Telangana Rashtra Samithi in 2004 and contested from Thungathurthi in 2014 Telangana Assembly Elections & 2018 Telangana Elections and was elected as MLA by defeating opponents 2 times.

== Personal life ==
He married on 14 August 2014, after becoming an MLA.
