= Boora Narsaiah Goud =

Indian politician (born 1959)

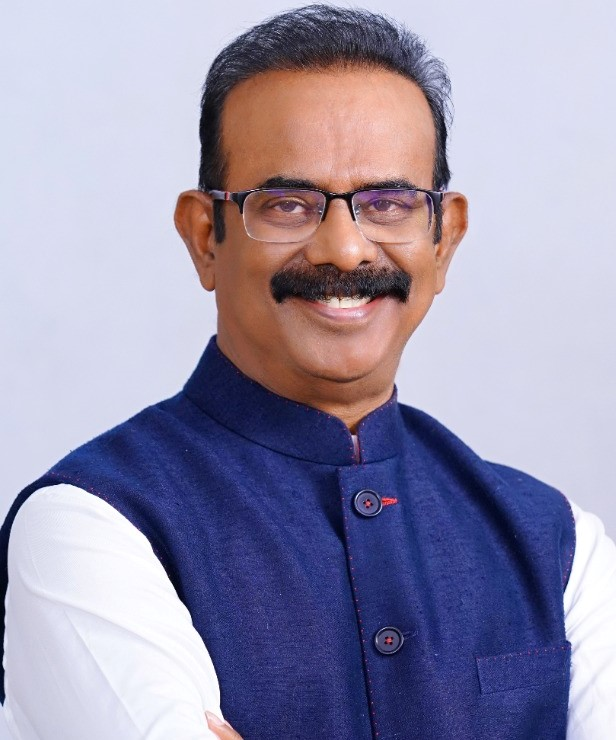

Member of Parliament, Lok Sabha
- In office 16 May 2014 – 23 May 2019
- Preceded by: Komatireddy Raj Gopal Reddy
- Succeeded by: Komatireddy Venkat Reddy
- Constituency: Bhuvanagiri

Personal details
- Born: 2 March 1959 (age 67) Suryapet, Andhra Pradesh (now in Telangana), India
- Party: Bharatiya Janata Party (2022-present)
- Other party: Bharat Rashtra Samithi (2009-2022)
- Children: 1
- Website: http://booranarsaiahgoud.com/

Boora Narsaiah Goud (born 2 March 1959) is an Indian politician in the state of Telangana. Joining in the Bharat Rashtra Samithi political party in 2009 he has won as a Member of Parliament in the 16th Lok Sabha representing Bhongir constituency in 2014 election and lost in 2019.

Goud has quit the BRS on 15 October 2022 & joined BJP on 19 October 2022. He was appointed as State BJP Vice president on 8 September 2025.

He earlier was laparoscopic, obesity and gastrointestinal surgeon from Telangana, India. He was an active proponent of Telangana statehood and was a member of Telangana Joint Action Committee.

He is currently the director of Hyderabad Institute of Laparoendoscopic Surgery (HILS) and provides services at Aditya Hospital and Care Hospital in Telangana.

== Early life ==
He was born in Suryapet, Andhra Pradesh. He studied medicine at Osmania Medical College.

== Career ==
He studied until the Intermediate level at Suryapet and later graduated from Osmania Medical College in 1983 with First division and Distinction in 4 subjects. He did his M.S. in general surgery from Osmania Medical College, followed by specialization in laparoscopic surgery. He is a teacher, academician, trainer in laparoscopy, writer and social worker.

Education

MS Gen. Surgery, 1984 – 1987 Osmania Medical College

MBBS Passed in First Division with distinctions in 4 Subjects 1976 – 83 at Osmania Medical College

Experience

1996 onwards – Hyderabad Institute of Laparoendoscopic Surgery (HILS)

Aditya Hospital, HOD (Surgical Gastroenterologist) Star Hospitals - Banjara Hills, Bariatric & Metabolic institute (BMI)

Govt. postings

1991 to 1995 Assistant Professor of Surgery, Osmania General Hospital and Osmania Medical College

1987 to 1990 Asst. Civil Surgeon, Medical Officer and District in charge – Laparoscopic Surgery at Mahaboobnagar.

=== Experience & Academics in Profession ===
==== Laparoscopic surgery ====
Goud is one of the pioneer surgeons of laparoscopy in India with more than 32,000 laparoscopic surgeries to his credit, from basic to advanced procedures. He has experience in general surgery, GI surgery, gynaec laparoscopy, thoracoscopy, cancer surgery, pediatric surgery, endocrine surgery and obesity surgery.

He has experience in obesity surgery (bariatric metabolic surgery) with one of highest numbers of surgeries performed in AP, TS and India. He is also experienced in open & major procedures like PC shunts, liver resections, esophagastrectomies, thyroid, parathyroid surgeries.

As civil assistant surgeon of PHC Amangal contributed to maximum number of family welfare procedures, major procedures like appendicectomy, hysterectomies, LSCS, pediatric surgery, recanalizations and other procedures under only spinal anesthesia.

He is a self-taught laparoscopic surgeon who has performed more than 32,000 laparoscopic surgeries. He performed laparoscopic surgeries for incisional hernia, hiatus hernia, carcinoma colon, and cancer cervix in Hyderabad, and performed thoracoscopic decompression for B spine in Hyderabad.

He conducted CME and workshops on laparoscopic surgery. He also presented a number of papers at state and national surgical forums.

==== Organization (Academic) ====
- Secretary ASI AP chapter 2 times from 2005 to 2009
- GC member ASI
- Vice president – AMASI
- Honorary secretary – AMASI
- Governing council member – ASI
- EC member HSI (Hernia Society of India)

=== Political career ===
He started taking an active role in the latest round of the Telangana agitation. He contested and won as a Member of Parliament from Bhongir (Lok Sabha constituency) in 2014 on a TRS party ticket, with a margin of over 30,300 votes.

=== Telangana movement (2009 – 2014) ===
He participated in the Telangana movement and established DOTS (Doctors of Telangana State). He also actively participated in movements like rasta roko, million march, sagara haram, rail roko, and assembly muttadi. He was arrested twice as part of the movement.

== Fellowships ==
He is a Fellow of several organisations:

- Fellow Association of Indian Surgeons (FAIS)
- Fellow International College of Surgeons (FICS)
- Fellow Minimal Access Surgeons of India (FMAS)

== Awards ==
- Special Surgical Skill award from Central Health Ministry in 1989.
- Best Surgeon award in 1990.
