= Komatireddy Raj Gopal Reddy =

Indian politician (born 1967)

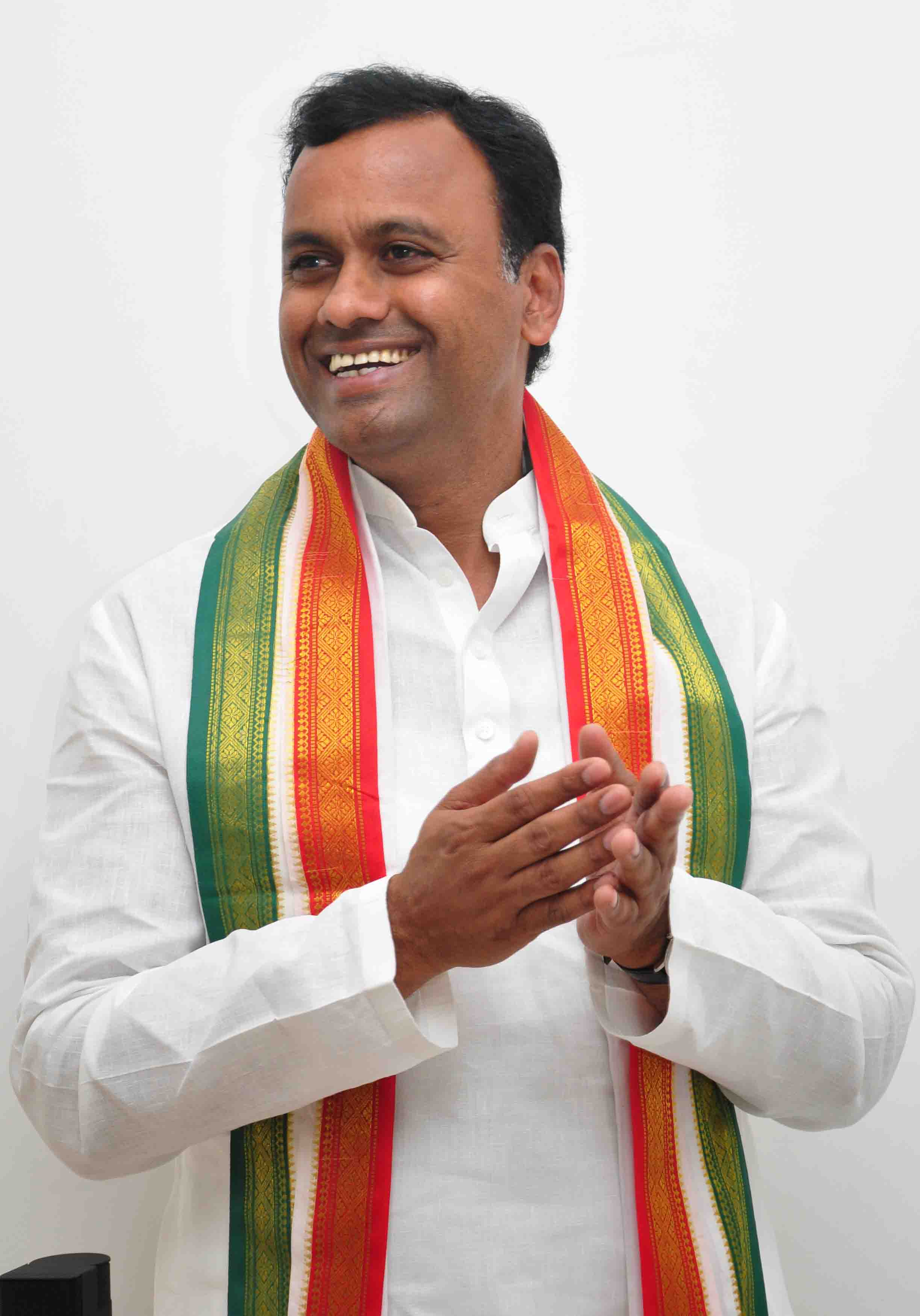
- Reddy in 2022

Member of Legislative Assembly, Telangana
- Incumbent
- Assumed office 7 December 2023
- Preceded by: Kusukuntla Prabhakar Reddy
- Constituency: Munugode
- In office 11 December 2018 – 4 November 2022
- Preceded by: Kusukuntla Prabhakar Reddy
- Succeeded by: Kusukuntla Prabhakar Reddy
- Constituency: Munugode

Member of Legislative Council, Telangana
- In office 30 December 2016 – 10 December 2018
- Constituency: Local Authorities constituency (Nalgonda)

Member of Parliament, Lok Sabha
- In office 2009–2014
- Preceded by: Constituency established
- Succeeded by: Boora Narsaiah Goud
- Constituency: Bhongir

Personal details
- Born: 1 June 1967 (age 59) Brahmana Vellemla, Nalgonda district, Andhra Pradesh (present-day Telangana)
- Party: Indian National Congress (until 2022; since 2023)
- Other political affiliations: Bharatiya Janata Party (2022–2023)
- Spouse: Lakshmi
- Children: 1
- Relatives: Komatireddy Venkat Reddy (brother)

Komatireddy Raj Gopal Reddy (born 1 June 1967) is an Indian politician from Telangana. He is a Member of Legislative Assembly representing the Munugode Assembly constituency. He is a former Member of Legislative Council and a former Member of Parliament, Lok Sabha from Bhongir Lok Sabha constituency. He is currently a member of the Indian National Congress.

== Electoral history ==
Year	Constituency	Party	Votes	Opponent		Result	Margin
2009	Bhongir	INC	504,103	CPI(M)	Nomula Narsimhaiah	Won	139,888
2014	Bhongir	INC	417,620	TRS	Boora Narsaiah Goud	Lost	-30,544
2015 (MLC)	Nalgonda Local Authorities	INC	581	TRS	Tera Chinnapa Reddy	Won	191
2018	Munugode	INC	97,239	TRS	Kusukuntla Prabhakar Reddy	Won	22,555
2022 (By-election)	Munugode	BJP	86,697	TRS	Kusukuntla Prabhakar Reddy	Lost	-10,309
2023	Munugode	INC	99,935	BRS	Kusukuntla Prabhakar Reddy	Won	15,317

== Early life ==
He was born in Brahmana Vellemla village, Narketpally, Nalgonda district to Papi Reddy and Susheelamma. He holds a bachelor's degree in Arts. His elder brother, Komatireddy Venkat Reddy is also a politician.

== Career ==
Reddy won from Bhongir constituency in 2009. Reddy is an entrepreneur turned politician. He actively participated in the Telangana agitation by voicing his opinion in the parliament for the separate statehood of Telangana. He lost to Bura Narsaiah Goud for the Bhongir parliamentary constituency in 2014 Parliament elections. He won as a Member of the Legislative Council for the Local bodies constituency of Nalgonda Dist. He resigned from the post of MLC with 3 years of tenure remaining and won as a Member of the Legislative Assembly from Munugode Assembly constituency in the 2018 Assembly elections. He fought for the issues related to his constituency but all in vain as the ruling party TRS wasn't able to fulfil the demands of their constituents thereby leading him to resign from the post of MLA. He joined Bhartiya Janata Party (BJP) on August 21 and contested as a BJP candidate in Munugode Assembly by-election and lost to Kusukuntla Prabhakar Reddy of BRS party. Komatireddy Rajgopal Reddy was appointed a BJP national executive committee member on 5 July 2023.
