= Kumbam Anil Kumar Reddy =

Indian politician from Telangana

Member of Telangana Legislative Assembly
- Incumbent
- Assumed office 3 December 2023
- Preceded by: Pailla Shekar Reddy
- Constituency: Bhongir

Personal details
- Born: 8 February 1961 (age 65) Valigonda, Yadadri Bhuvanagiri district, Telangana, India
- Party: Indian National Congress
- Other political affiliations: BRS (July 2023 - September 2023)
- Spouse: Jyothi Reddy
- Children: Keerthi Reddy
- Parent: Srinivas Reddy (father)

Kumbam Anil Kumar Reddy is an Indian politician from Telangana. He was elected as member of the Telangana Legislative Assembly from Bhongir constituency in Yadadri Bhuvanagiri district in 2023 Telangana Assembly elections.

== Political career ==
Anil Kumar began his political career with Indian National Congress and he unsuccessfully contested in 2018 on Indian National Congress Ticket from Bhongir Assembly seat in 2018 and was runner-up with over 60,000 votes with a vote share of 35.45 percent. he was appointed as Yadadri Bhuvanagir DCC President had left the Congress owing to local politics which were influenced by Bhongir MP Komatireddy Venkat Reddy on 24 July 2023 and joined the ruling BRS in the presence of Chief Minister K. Chandra Shekhar Rao.

Anil Kumar Two months after joining the ruling BRS switched over to the Congress party on in the presence of TPCC chief A. Revanth Reddy on 25 September. He contested the 2023 Telangana Legislative Assembly election from the Bhongir Constituency and won by a margin of 26201 votes, defeating BRS candidate Pailla Shekar Reddy.
