= Shaligowraram =

- Nickname: Gouraram
- Location Map Telangana India Shaligowraram (India)
- Coordinates: 17.2982°N 79.3884°E
- Country: India
- State: Telangana
- District: Nalgonda
- Named for: Shaligouraram Project

Area
  - Total: 14.57 km^{2} (5.63 sq mi)

Population (2011)
  - Total: 5,214
  - Density: 357.9/km^{2} (926.8/sq mi)

Languages
  - Official: Telugu
- Time zone: UTC+5:30 (IST)
- PIN: 508210
- Vehicle registration: TS
- Climate: hot (Köppen)
- Website: telangana.gov.in

Shaligowraram is a village in Nalgonda district of the Indian state of Telangana. It is located in Shaligowraram mandal of Nalgonda division. It is the headquarters of Shaligouraram mandal.

== Government and politics ==
The major political parties are the Indian National Congress, Bharatiya Janata Party, Bharat Rashtra Samithi, and other left parties
