= Munugode =

Munugode మునుగోడు
- Village
- Location in Telangana, India Munugode (India)
- Coordinates: 17.0667°N 79.0667°E
- Country: India
- State: Telangana
- District: Nalgonda
- Elevation: 241 m (791 ft)

Languages
  - Official: Telugu
- Time zone: UTC+5:30 (IST)
- PIN: 508244
- Telephone code: 08681 237633
- Vehicle registration: TS 05
- Nearest city: Nalgonda
- Lok Sabha constituency: Bhongir
- Vidhan Sabha constituency: Munugode
- Climate: hot (Köppen)
- Website: telangana.gov.in

Mungode, Munugodu or Munugode is a village located in Munugode Mandal in Nalgonda Division of Nalgonda district of Telangana state, India. It is 21 Kilometers westward from Nalgonda town. Munugode village has a population of 10141, of which 5294 are males, while 4847 are females, as per Population Census 2011.

== Geography and villages ==
Munungode is located at 17.0667°N 79.0667°E. It has an average elevation of 241 metres (793 ft).

1. Kistapuram

2. Koratikal

3. Chikati Mamidi

4. Kompally

5. Palivela

6. Laxmidevigudem

7. Ravi Gudem

8. Kachalapuram

9. Madunapuram

10. Rathipally

11. Gundlori Gudem

12. Gangori Gudem

13. Gudapur

14. Velmakanne

15. Kalvakuntla

16. Cholledu

17. Vookondi

18. Singaram.
