= Mandula Samuel =

Indian politician

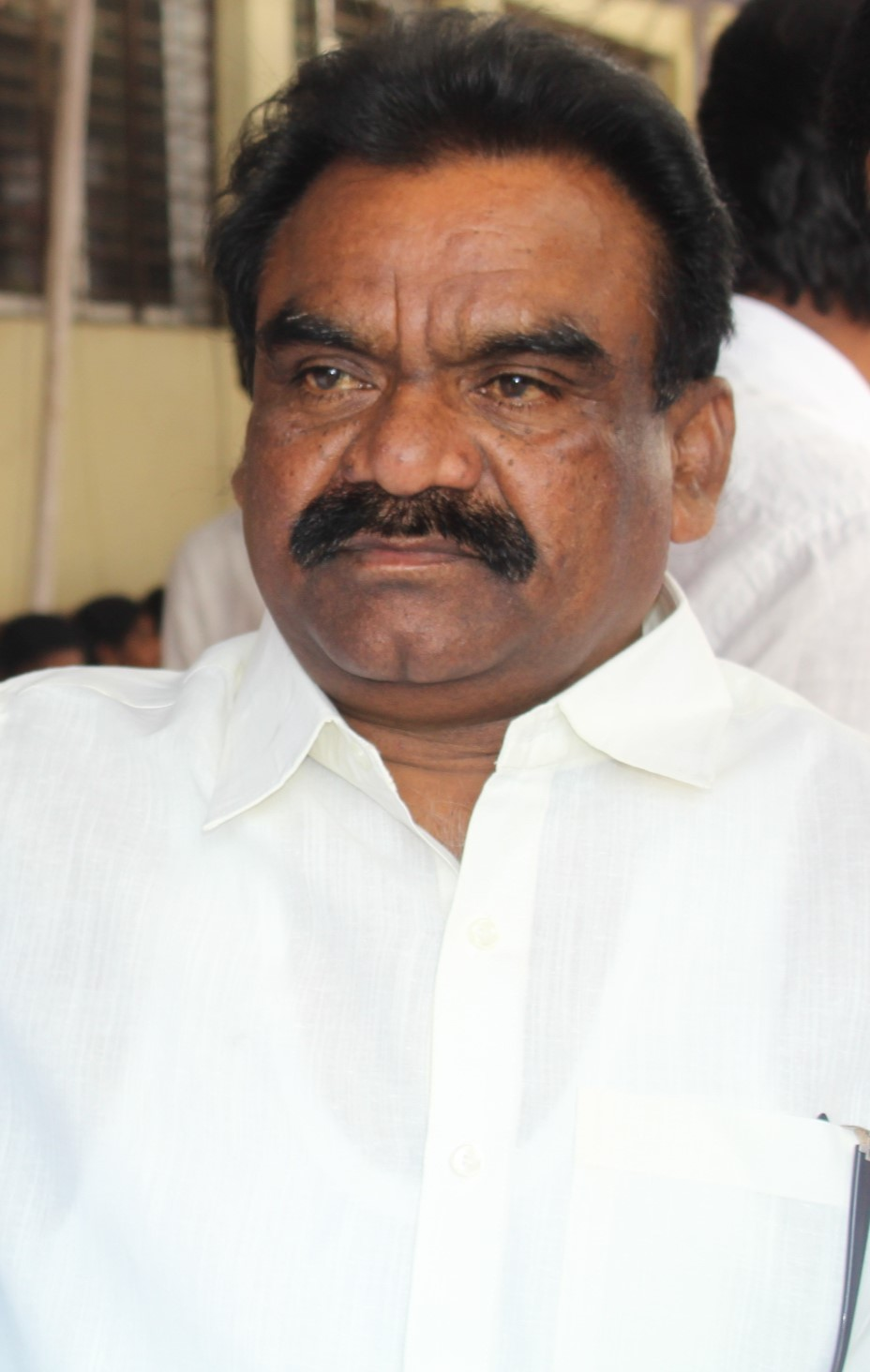
Mandula Samuel

Mandula Samuel (born 14 July 1961) is an Indian politician from Telangana state. He is an MLA from Thungathurthi Assembly constituency which is reserved for SC community Suryapet district. He represents Indian National Congress Party and won the 2023 Telangana Legislative Assembly election.

== Early life and education ==
Samuel was born to Mandula Ramaiah in Dharmaram village, Addagudur mandal, Yadadri Bhuvanagiri district. He has three children, Vennela, Surya Kiran and Bhanu Kiran. He did his intermediate, the pre university course, in 1980 at Government College Bhonagiri, Yadadri Bhonagiri district.

== Career ==
Samuel was with Telangana Rashtra Samithi right from its founding days in 2001. From 2005 to 2014, he headed the SC cell of TRS. In 2008 when Thungathurthi was declared as an SC reserved seat, he was nominated to contest from this seat but due to the alliance it was given to TDP, in the seat sharing arrangement. He was made the chairman of the Telangana State Warehousing Corporation from 2016 to 2021. After he was rejected the MLA seat on multiple occasions, he joined the Indian National Congress in September 2023. He was declared as the MLA candidate and he won the Thungathurthi Assembly constituency defeating Gadari Kishore of BRS by a margin of 51,094 votes.
