= Bhupalpalle Assembly constituency =

Constituency of the Telangana legislative assembly in India

Coordinates: 18.43°N 79.86°E

Bhupalpalle
- Constituency No. 108 for the Telangana Legislative Assembly
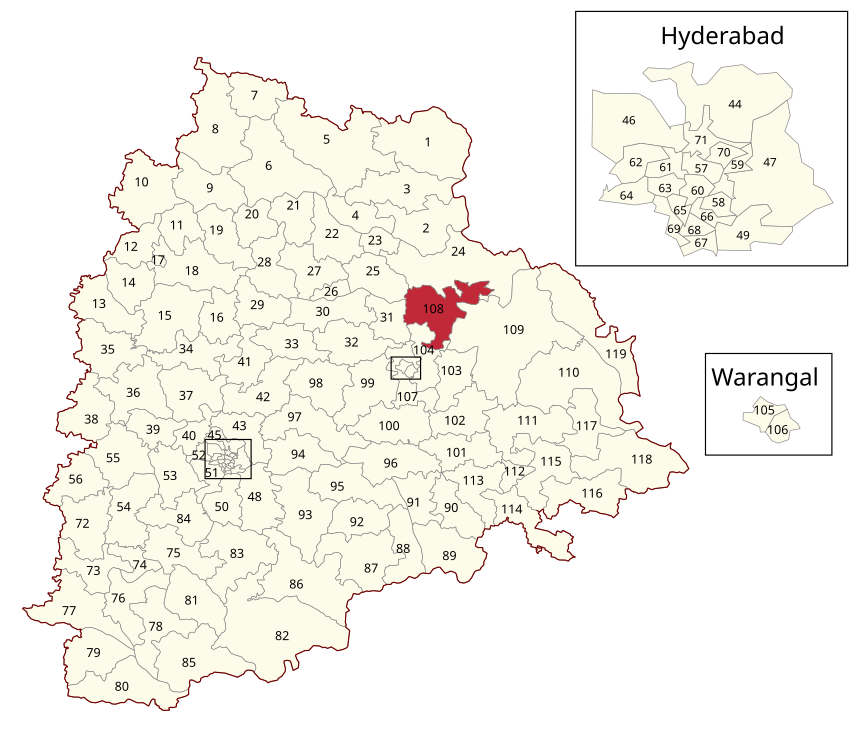
- Location of Bhupalpalle Assembly constituency within Telangana

Constituency details
- Country: India
- Region: South India
- State: Telangana
- District: Warangal
- Lok Sabha constituency: Warangal
- Established: 2008
- Total electors: 2,34,620
- Reservation: None

Member of Legislative Assembly
- 3rd Telangana Legislative Assembly
- Incumbent Gandra Satyanarayana Rao
- Party: Indian National Congress
- Elected year: 2023

Bhupalpalle Assembly constituency is a constituency of Telangana Legislative Assembly, India. It is one of 12 constituencies in Warangal district. It is part of Warangal Lok Sabha constituency.

== Mandals ==
The Assembly Constituency presently comprises the following Mandals:

Mandal
Bhupalpalle
Mogullapalle
Chityal
Ghanpur
Regonda
Shyampet
Kothapallygori

== Members of Legislative Assembly ==
Election	Member	Party
Andhra Pradesh
2009	Gandra Venkata Ramana Reddy	Indian National Congress
Telangana
2014	S. Madhusudhana Chary	Telangana Rashtra Samithi
2018	Gandra Venkata Ramana Reddy	Indian National Congress
2023	Gandra Satyanarayana Rao	Indian National Congress

== Election results ==
=== Telangana Legislative Assembly election, 2023 ===
Telangana Assembly Elections, 2023: Bhupalpalle
Party	Candidate	Votes	%	±%
INC	Gandra Satyanarayana Rao	123,116	54.55	
BRS	Gandra Venkata Ramana Reddy	70,417	31.2	
BJP	Chandupatla Keerthi Reddy	14,731	6.53	
Alliance of Democratic Reforms Party	Ramesh Goud Tallapally	3,464	1.53	
Independent	Sampath Manthena	2,901	1.29	
BSP	Gajji Jithender	2,010	0.89	
Aabaad Party	Adlakonda Sravanthi	1,130	0.5	
Telangana Communist Party of India	Vangara Sambaiah	1,012	0.45	
Marxist Communist Party of India	Asraf Mahmad	916	0.41	
Independent	Allam Mahesh	833	0.37	
NOTA	None of the Above	830	0.37	
Majority		52,699	23.35	
Turnout		2,25,688		
INC gain from BRS		Swing		

=== Telangana Legislative Assembly election, 2018 ===
2018 Telangana Legislative Assembly election: Bhupalpalle
Party	Candidate	Votes	%	±%
INC	Gandra Venkata Ramana Reddy	69,918	33.50	+2.96
AIFB	Gandra Satyanarayana Rao	54,283	26.00	New
TRS	S. Madhusudhana Chary	53,567	25.66	−8.68
BJP	Chandupatla Keerthi Reddy	15,744	7.54	−22.80
NOTA	None of the Above	1,399	0.67	
Majority		15,635	7.50	
Turnout		2,08,741	82.13	
INC gain from TRS		Swing		

=== Telangana Legislative Assembly election, 2014 ===
2014 Telangana Legislative Assembly election: Bhupalpalle
Party	Candidate	Votes	%	±%
TRS	S. Madhusudhana Chary	65,113	34.34	
INC	Gandra Venkata Ramana Reddy	57,899	30.54	
BJP	Gandra Satyanarayana Rao	57,530	30.34	
Majority		7,214	3.40	
Turnout		1,88,296	79.73	
TRS gain from INC		Swing		

== See also ==
- List of constituencies of Telangana Legislative Assembly
