= Gori Kothapally =

Mandal and village of Telangana state

Gori Kothapally గోరి కొత్తపల్లి Kothapallegori or Kothapallygori
- Mandal
- Location in Telangana, India Gori Kothapally (India)
- Coordinates: 18°10′54.9″N 79°48′31.0″E
- Country: India
- State: Telangana
- District: Jayashankar Bhupalpally (Acharya Jayashankar)
- Mandal: Kothapallygori
- Village: Kothapalligori
- Established: 1860s
- Founder: Mohammed Immam Ghori
- Seat: Gram Panchayat office
- villages: List: Balaiahapally, Chenchupally, Chennapur, Chinnakodepaka, Damaranchapally, Gandhi Nagar, Ijjaiahpally, Jaggaiahpet, Konaraopet, Kothapalli, Kothapallygori, Nizampally, Rajakkapally, Ramagundalapally, Sulthanpur, Venkateshwarlapally,

Government
  - Type: Sarpanch-Panchyat Government
  - Body: Gram panchayat
  - Sarpanch: Nimmala Shankar (BRS)

Area
  - Rural: 1,634 ha (4,040 acres)
- Elevation: 251 m (823 ft)

Population (2011)
  - [Village]: 6,240
- Time zone: UTC+5:30 (Indian Standard Time)
- Postal code: 506348
- Vehicle registration: TG-25

Gori Kothapally, also known as Kothapallegori or Kothapallygori, is a village and the administrative headquarters of the Kothapallygori Mandal in the Jayashankar Bhupalpally district of the Indian state of Telangana.

The village was formerly part of Regonda Mandal in the erstwhile Warangal district. After district reorganisation, it became part of the newly created Jayashankar Bhupalpally district and continued under Regonda Mandal until it was designated as the headquarters of the newly formed Kothapallygori Mandal following mandal reorganisation. It falls under the Bhupalpalle Assembly constituency and the Warangal Lok Sabha constituency.

== History ==
=== Origins and Foundation ===
The history of Gori Kothapally dates back to the 1860s when it was established by Mohammed Immam Ghori, a feudal landlord (locally known as Dora) in the erstwhile Hyderabad State. The village derives its name 'Gori' from its founder.

According to local oral tradition, the land for the village was acquired through a grant (Inam) from the Desai of Atmakur. The Desai, who suffered from a chronic ailment known locally as Pundu, was treated successfully by Ghori, a practitioner of traditional herbal medicine (Natu Vaidyam). In gratitude for the cure, the Desai granted Ghori a tract of dense forest land located in the Mallempally–Jakaram range.

=== Town Planning and Infrastructure ===
Upon acquiring the land, Ghori oversaw the deforestation required to establish the settlement. He implemented a structured town planning system, which featured wide, 30-foot roads and detailed route maps to ensure connectivity with surrounding areas.

Significant efforts were made to develop local agriculture and irrigation. Lakes and wells were constructed in the four cardinal directions of the village, creating water sources that remain in use today. To transform the infertile forest soil into arable land, mango groves were planted along the approach roads leading into the village.

To populate the settlement, migrants were invited from neighboring regions, including present-day Karimnagar and Warangal districts. These early settlers were tasked with clearing the land and were offered incentives such as low-cost land ownership and livelihood opportunities.

=== Transition of Governance ===
Following its foundation, the administration of Gori Kothapally was maintained by Mohammed Immam Ghori's descendants. The village remained under this feudal administrative structure until 1948. Following Operation Polo and the annexation of Hyderabad State, governance was transitioned to the Government of India.

== Geography ==
Gori Kothapally is located at coordinates 18°10'54.9"N 79°48'31.0"E, with an average elevation of 251 meters above sea level. The nearest rivers to the village are 'Are Vagu' and 'Sali Vagu.' It is situated 38.2 kilometers from the district headquarters, Bhupalpally. Nearby villages include Sulthanpur (2 kilometers), Vasanthapur (3 kilometers), Venkateshwarla Pally (3 kilometers), Koppula (4 kilometers), and Abbapuram (4 kilometers). Gori Kothapally is surrounded by Shyampet Mandal to the west, Parkal Mandal to the west, Mulug Mandal to the east, and Ghanapur (Mulug) Mandal to the north.

== Demographics ==
As of the 2011 Census of India, the revenue village of Gori Kothapally had a total population of 6,240, residing in 1,707 households. The gender ratio consists of a female population of 50.3%.

The village recorded a total literacy rate of 52.3%. However, there is a disparity in literacy distribution, with the female literacy rate standing at 21.1%.

Census Parameter	Census Data
Total Population	6240
Total No of Houses	1707
Female Population %	50.3 % ( 3136)
Total Literacy rate %	52.3 % ( 3264)
Female Literacy rate	21.1 % ( 1318)
Scheduled Tribes Population %	0.7 % ( 46)
Scheduled Caste Population %	12.4 % ( 774)
Working Population %	55.2 %
Child(0 -6) Population by 2011	583
Girl Child(0 -6) Population % by 2011	48.4 % ( 282)

The major population of the village belongs to the Backward caste, among which the Mudhiraju caste is the most numerous.

== Government and politics ==
=== Administration ===
The village is administered by a Gram Panchayat, which is divided into 12 wards.

As the administrative headquarters, the Kothapallygori Mandal comprises the following Gram Panchayats:

- Balaiahapally
- Chenchupally
- Chennapur
- Chinnakodepaka
- Damaranchapally
- Gandhi Nagar
- Ijjaiahpally
- Jaggaiahpet
- Konaraopet
- Kothapalli
- Kothapallygori
- Nizampally
- Rajakkapally
- Ramagundalapally
- Sulthanpur
- Venkateshwarlapally

=== Political parties ===
BRS, INC and BJP are the major parties in the village.

=== Law & order ===
The Kothapally Mandal Police are responsible for maintaining law and order in the village and the surrounding mandal jurisdiction.

=== Health care ===
The primary healthcare needs of the mandal are currently served by the centers in Regonda, Sulthanpur, Nizampally, and Koppula.

== Agriculture ==
The economy of Gori Kothapally is predominantly agrarian. The primary agricultural activities revolve around the cultivation of Paddy, Chili, and Cotton.

In addition to these major crops, farmers in the village also cultivate Banana, Groundnut, and various Pulses.

== Transport ==
=== Road ===
Gori Kothapally is well-connected by road to major urban centers. It is accessible via the following National Highways:

- National Highway 163 (India)|NH 163 (Hyderabad – Bhopalpatnam)
- National Highway 563 (India)|NH 563 (Jagtial – Warangal – Khammam)
- National Highway 353C (India)|NH 353C (Sironcha – Atmakur)

The nearest major city is Warangal, located approximately 50 km from the village. Regular state-run bus services (TGSRTC) connect the village to Warangal and other nearby towns.

==== Bus Stop ====
Gori Kothapally

=== Railways ===
Railways There is no railway station within a 10 km radius of the village. The nearest railway stations are located in Warangal and Uppal railway station. Commuters typically reach these stations by road to access the broader rail network.

== Culture ==
=== Festivals ===
The village observes several major festivals, with Dasara (Vijayadashami) being the most significant. It serves as a major homecoming event, where family members working in other regions return to the village. The festival typically begins with animal sacrifices. A distinct local tradition involves the consumption of mutton curry accompanied by Toddy. It is also customary to invite new sons-in-law to join the celebrations. Preparations begin days in advance with the making of traditional snacks known as Pindi Vantalu or Appalu.

Bathukamma, celebrated during the Navaratri period, is another major festival. The name translates to "Mother Goddess Come Alive." The festival involves the creation of flower stacks arranged in seven concentric layers to resemble a temple tower (Gopuram). These arrangements use unique seasonal flowers, many of which are believed to possess medicinal properties. By tradition, brothers gather these flowers for their mothers and sisters to assist in the arrangement.

The village is also noted for the communal observation of Muharram, which is celebrated harmoniously by all communities. During this period, a local fair is established with numerous temporary stalls selling bangles, household goods, and toys.

== Landmarks ==
The village is home to the ruins of the historical Gadi (fortified manor), which formerly served as the residence of the feudal landlord (Dora). Although the structure is now in a dilapidated state, the remains offer insight into the architectural style of the 19th-century Deccan region.

The building is notable for its pillar-less construction, relying instead on load-bearing brick masonry to support its multiple stories . The walls were constructed using Dungu Sunnam, a traditional lime mortar mixture composed of limestone powder and other organic additives, which was known for its durability before the advent of modern cement.

== Educational institutions ==
=== Schools ===
ZPHS Gori Kothapally, Gori Kothapally, Gori Kothapally mandal, Bhupalpally, Telangana,506348

== Notable people ==
- Katla Ravindar, Circle inspector of police
- Anusha Reddy, TV serial Actress
