= Ashireddipally =

- Location within Telangana Location within India
- Coordinates: 18.395°N 79.637°E
- Country: India
- State: Telangana
- District: Jayashankar Bhupalpally district

Ashireddipally is a village panchayat in Chityal mandal in Jayashankar Bhupalpally district in the state of Telangana in India.

== Location ==
Ashireddipally is 72 km from Warangal (next to Tekumatla traveling from Chityal towards Garmillapally). The Godavari River is near Ashireddipally.

== Population ==
The population is around 1,200. Ashireddipally's grama panchayat sarpanch is Swarnalatha Velishetty, who was elected in the 2019 grama panchayiti elections.

== Transport ==
Ashireddipally has a bus route. Buses are available from Parkal and Hanmakonda to Giddemutharam, Venkatrao Pally, or Garmillapally. Trains are available from nearby Jammikunta.

== Places of interest ==
Ashireddipally has three temples: Venkateshwara Swamy Temple, Hanuman Temple, and Baddi Pochamma Temple so it is written by sanikommuanureddy.

== Education ==
Ashireddipally has a government primary school. High school is available in nearby Tekumatla.

== Economy ==
Ashireddipally's economy is largely dependent on agriculture. 85% of the population depends on agriculture and related activities. Cotton, red chills, rice, and bananas are common crops. Most of the youth are well educated and working in various jobs in India and abroad.
