= Manthani Assembly constituency =

India legislative constituency

Coordinates: 18.65°N 79.67°E

Manthani
- Constituency No. 24 for the Telangana Legislative Assembly
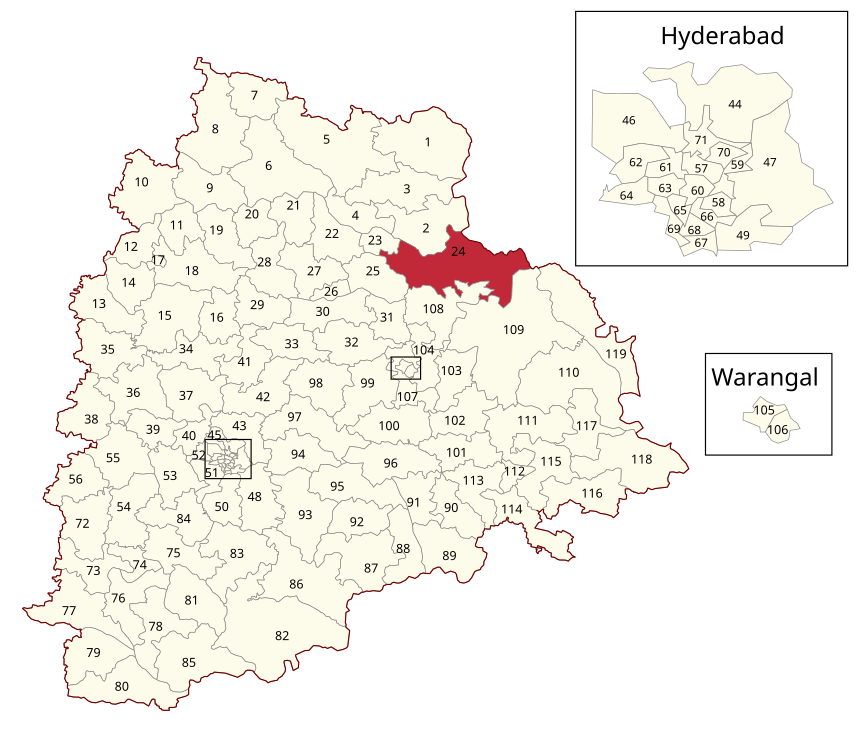
- Location of Manthani Assembly constituency within Telangana

Constituency details
- Country: India
- Region: South India
- State: Telangana
- District: Peddapalli
- Lok Sabha constituency: Peddapalli
- Established: 1951
- Total electors: 2,30,000
- Reservation: None

Member of Legislative Assembly
- 3rd Telangana Legislative Assembly
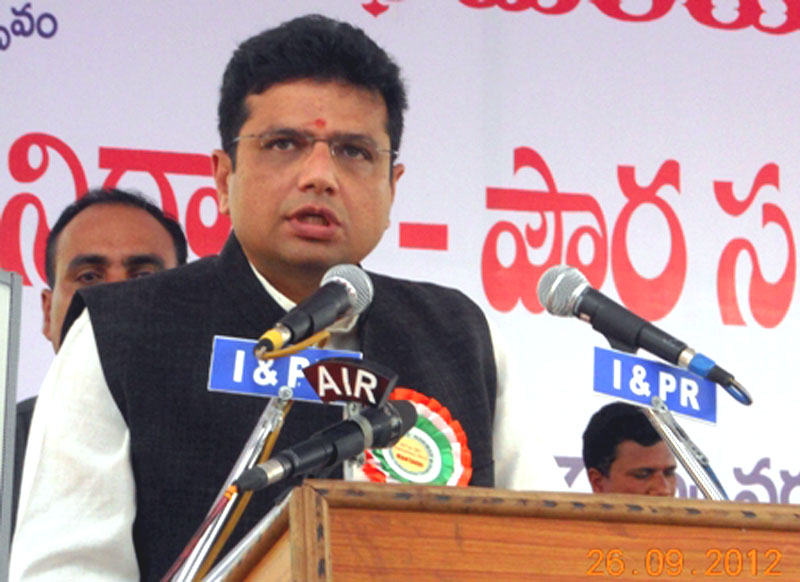
- Incumbent Dudilla Sridhar Babu
- Party: Indian National Congress
- Elected year: 2023

Manthani is an assembly constituency of Telangana Legislative Assembly, India. It is one of the three constituencies in Peddapalli district.

Manthani Legislative Assembly is one of the segments of Peddapalli Lok Sabha constituency.

Kaleshwara Mukteshwara Swamy Temple, Kaleshwaram, Mahadevpur Mandal

== Mandals ==
The assembly constituency presently comprises the following mandals:

Mandal	Districts
Manthani	Peddapalli
Kamanpur	Peddapalli
Kataram	Jayashankar Bhupalpally
Mahadevpur	Jayashankar Bhupalpally
Malharrao	Jayashankar Bhupalpally
Mutharam (Manthani)	Peddapalli
Mutharam (Mahadevpur)	Jayashankar Bhupalpally
Ramagiri	Peddapalli
Palimela	Jayashankar Bhupalpally
Palakurthy	Peddapalli

== Members of the Legislative Assembly ==
Year	Name	Party
Hyderabad State
1952	Gulukota Sriramulu	Socialist Party
United Andhra Pradesh
1957	P. V. Narasimha Rao	Indian National Congress
1962	P. V. Narasimha Rao	Indian National Congress
1967	P. V. Narasimha Rao	Indian National Congress
1972	P. V. Narasimha Rao	Indian National Congress
1978	Chandrupatla Narayana Reddy	Indian National Congress
1983	D. Sripada Rao	Indian National Congress
1985	D. Sripada Rao	Indian National Congress
1989	D. Sripada Rao	Indian National Congress
1994	Chandrupatla Ram Reddy	Telugu Desam Party
1999	Dudilla Sridhar Babu	Indian National Congress
2004	Dudilla Sridhar Babu	Indian National Congress
2009	Dudilla Sridhar Babu	Indian National Congress
Telangana Legislative Assembly
2014	Putta Madhu	Telangana Rashtra Samithi
2018	Dudilla Sridhar Babu	Indian National Congress
2023	Dudilla Sridhar Babu	Indian National Congress

== Election results ==
Vote share of Winning candidates
2023	52.82%
2018	50.41%
2014	49.38%
2009	42.27%
2004	59.24%
1999	54.31%
1994	54.63%
1989	53.05%
1985	50.13%
1983	46.38%
1978	38.09%
1972	91.85%
1967	61.09%
1962	67.69%
1957	66.74%
1952	74.69%

=== 2023 ===
Telangana Assembly Elections, 2023: Manthani (Assembly constituency)
Party	Candidate	Votes	%	±%
INC	Duddilla Sridhar Babu	103,822	52.82	
BRS	Putta Madhu	72,442	36.86	
BJP	Chandrupatla Sunil Reddy	5,779	2.94	
NOTA	None of the above	776	0.39	
Majority		31,380	15.96	
Turnout		1,96,543		
INC hold		Swing		

=== 2018 ===
Telangana Assembly Elections, 2018: Manthani (Assembly constituency)
Party	Candidate	Votes	%	±%
INC	Duddilla Sridhar Babu	89,045	50.41	
TRS	Putta Madhu	72,815	41.22	
SFB	T. Nagarjun	5,457	3.09	
NOTA	None of the Above	2,083	1.18	
Majority		16,230	9.19	
Turnout		1,76,646	85.41	
INC gain from TRS		Swing		

=== 2014 ===
Telangana Assembly Elections, 2014: Manthani (Assembly constituency)
Party	Candidate	Votes	%	±%
TRS	Putta Madhu	84,037	49.38	
INC	Duddilla Sridhar Babu	64,677	38.00	
TDP	Karru Nagaiah	9,735	5.72	
NOTA	None of the Above	1,339	0.79	
Majority		19,360	11.38	
Turnout		1,70,196	80.96	
TRS gain from INC		Swing		

=== 2009 ===
Andhra Pradesh Assembly Elections, 2009: Manthani (Assembly constituency)
Party	Candidate	Votes	%	±%
INC	Duddilla Sridhar Babu	63,770	42.27	
PRP	Putta Madhu	50,561	33.51	
TRS	Routhu Kankaiah	22,338	14.81	
Majority		13,209	8.76	
INC hold		Swing		

=== 2004 ===
2004 Andhra Pradesh Legislative Assembly election: Manthani
Party	Candidate	Votes	%	±%
INC	Duddilla Sridhar Babu	79,318	59.24	
TDP	Somarapu Satyanarayana	36,758	27.45	
JP	Chandrupatla Ram Reddy	12,569	9.39	
Independent	Kannuri Babu	1,934	1.44	
Independent	Bhukya Ramu Nayak	1,931	1.44	
Independent	Maddela Odelu	1,389	1.04	
Majority		42,560	31.78	
Turnout		133,899		
INC hold		Swing		

=== 1999 ===
1999 Andhra Pradesh Legislative Assembly election: Manthani
Party	Candidate	Votes	%	±%
INC	Duddilla Sridhar Babu	65,884	54.31	
TDP	Chandrupatla Ram Reddy	50,613	41.73	
BSP	Burgu Shankaraiah	1,654	1.36	
Independent	Thummala Raji Reddy	1,254	1.03	
ATDP	Gondi Vijaya Kumari	836	0.69	
AJBP	Sampelly Praveen Rao	577	0.48	
Independent	Lakkepuram Vijaya Bhasker	482	0.40	
Majority		15,271	12.58	
Turnout		127,608	68.84	
INC gain from TDP		Swing		

=== 1994 ===
1994 Andhra Pradesh Legislative Assembly election: Manthani
Party	Candidate	Votes	%	±%
TDP	Ram Reddy Chandrupatla	61,504	54.63	
INC	Duddilla Sripada Rao	40,349	35.84	
BSP	Boda Rajaram	5,046	4.48	
BJP	Kondapaka Sathyaprakash	3,789	3.37	
Independent	Nallani Swami Rao	1,169	1.04	
Independent	Sridar Rayamallu	625	0.56	
Independent	Kankaiah Muddasani	103	0.09	
Majority		21,155	18.79	
Turnout		116,739	71.35	
TDP gain from INC		Swing		

=== 1989 ===
1989 Andhra Pradesh Legislative Assembly election: Manthani
Party	Candidate	Votes	%	±%
INC	Duddilla Sripada Rao	50,658	53.05	
TDP	Bellamkonda Sakku Bai	43,880	45.96	
Independent	Dande Laxminarayana	945	0.99	
Majority		6,778	7.09	
Turnout		101,171	67.00	
INC hold		Swing		

=== 1985 ===
1985 Andhra Pradesh Legislative Assembly election: Manthani
Party	Candidate	Votes	%	±%
INC	Duddilla Sripada Rao	34,448	50.13	
TDP	Bellamkonda Narsinga Rao	27,046	39.36	
Independent	Bellam Konda Gopal Reddy	3,268	4.76	
Independent	Kolanu Kamalakar Reddy	960	1.40	
Independent	Jagiri Rajaiah	908	1.32	
Independent	Lingam Rajaiah	607	0.88	
Independent	Rampalli Kishtaiah	558	0.81	
Independent	Nagula Ram Reddy	398	0.58	
Independent	Kondela Maruthi	307	0.45	
Independent	Badikela Pochaiah	214	0.31	
Majority		7,402	10.77	
Turnout		70,753	60.07	
INC hold		Swing		

=== 1983 ===
1983 Andhra Pradesh Legislative Assembly election: Manthani
Party	Candidate	Votes	%	±%
INC	Duddilla Sripada Rao	28,470	46.38	
Independent	Chandupatla Raji Reddy	27,107	44.16	
Independent	Goli Narayana Reddy	1,965	3.20	
Independent	Badevath Chandu	1,837	2.99	
Independent	Muduganti Sudhakara Reddy	1,131	1.84	
LKD	Vallaba Venkateshwara Rao	464	0.76	
Independent	Bommani Rajalinga Reddy	409	0.67	
Majority		1,363	2.22	
Turnout		63,409	63.14	
INC hold		Swing		

=== 1978 ===
1978 Andhra Pradesh Legislative Assembly election: Manthani
Party	Candidate	Votes	%	±%
INC(I)	C. Narayana Reddy	20,482	38.09	
INC	Voora Srinivasa Rao	11,890	22.11	
Independent	P. Kishna Rao	7,571	14.08	
JP	Chennamaneni Vidyasagar Rao	6,532	12.15	
Independent	Mandala Ram Reddy	4,685	8.71	
Independent	Pratap Reddy Suram	1,919	3.57	
Independent	S. R. Laxman	693	1.29	
Majority		8,592	15.98	
Turnout		56,282	61.86	
INC(I) gain from INC		Swing		

=== 1972 ===
1972 Andhra Pradesh Legislative Assembly election: Manthani
Party	Candidate	Votes	%	±%
INC	P. V. Narsimha Rao	35,532	91.85	
STS	E. V. Padmanbhan	3,151	8.15	
Majority		32,381	83.70	
Turnout		40,741	48.12	
INC hold		Swing		

=== 1967 ===
1967 Andhra Pradesh Legislative Assembly election: Manthani
Party	Candidate	Votes	%	±%
INC	P. V. N. Rao	25,810	61.09	
Independent	K. M. R. Ura	16,440	38.91	
Majority		9,370	22.18	
Turnout		44,782	64.88	
INC hold		Swing		

=== 1962 ===
1962 Andhra Pradesh Legislative Assembly election: Manthani
Party	Candidate	Votes	%	±%
INC	P. V. Rao	16,844	67.69	
Independent	Gulukota Sriramulu	3,740	15.03	
CPI	Sayapraju Murlidhar Rao	2,482	9.97	
Independent	S. R. Laxman	1,818	7.31	
Majority		13,104	52.66	
Turnout		27,445	44.63	
INC hold		Swing		

=== 1957 ===
1957 Andhra Pradesh Legislative Assembly election: Manthani
Party	Candidate	Votes	%	±%
INC	P. V. Narasimha Rao	19,270	66.74	
PDF	Nambiah	9,603	33.26	
Majority		9,667	33.48	
Turnout		28,873	53.31	
INC gain from Socialist		Swing		

=== 1952 ===
1952 Hyderabad State Legislative Assembly election: Manthani
Party	Candidate	Votes	%	±%
Socialist	Gulukota Sri Ramulu	19,006	74.69	
INC	Raghunath Kache	6,441	25.31	
Majority		12,565	49.38	
Turnout		25,447	57.68	
Socialist win (new seat)				

== See also ==
- List of constituencies of Telangana Legislative Assembly
