= Gandra Satyanarayana Rao =

Indian politician

Member of the Andhra Pradesh Legislative Assembly
- In office 2009–2014
- Preceded by: Constituency created
- Succeeded by: S. Madhusudhana Chary

Member of the Telangana Legislative Assembly
- Incumbent
- Assumed office 2023
- Preceded by: Gandra Venkata Ramana Reddy

Gandra Satyanarayana Rao (born 1965) is an Indian politician from Telangana. He is an MLA from Bhupalpalle Assembly constituency in Jayashankar Bhupalpally district. He represents Indian National Congress party and won the 2023 Telangana Legislative Assembly election.

== Early life and education ==
Rao is from Bhupalpally, Jayashankar Bhupalpally district. His father Gandra Samma Rao is a farmer. He did his diploma in ITI civil.

== Career ==
Rao won from Bhupalpalle Assembly constituency representing Indian National Congress in the 2023 Telangana Legislative Assembly election. He polled 123,116 votes and defeated his nearest rival, Gandra Venkata Ramana Reddy of Bharat Rashtra Samithi, by a huge margin of 52,699 votes. Earlier in the 2018 Telangana Legislative Assembly election, he contested on All India Forward Bloc ticket and lost the Bhupalpalle seat to Ramana Reddy by a margin of 15,635 votes.
