= Putta Madhu =

Indian politician

Putta Madhukar (born 1 April 1972), also known as Madhu, is an Indian politician from Telangana state. He was a former Member of the Telangana Legislative Assembly in 2014 from Manthani Assembly constituency, in Karimnagar district, representing the Bharat Rashtra Samithi.

== Early life ==
Madhukar was born in Manthani, Karimnagar district, Telangana state, on 1 April 1972 to Rajalingam and Lingamma. He studied till Class 10 at Government High School, Manthani and passed the Board of Secondary Education examinations in 1988. He declared assets worth Rs.45 lakhs in his affidavit to the Election Commission of India.

== Career ==
Madhukar won the Manthani Assembly constituency in the 2014 Andhra Pradesh Legislative Assembly election representing the Telangana Rashtra Samithi. He polled 84,037 votes and defeated his nearest rival, Sridhar Babu of the Indian National Congress, by a margin of 19,360 votes. He lost to Duddilla Sridhar Babu of the Indian National Congress, from Manthani in the 2018 Telangana Legislative Assembly election. He polled 72,815 votes and lost by a margin of 16,230 votes. He also lost the 2023 Telangana Legislative Assembly election on BRS ticket to Sridhar.
