= Chityal =

Chityal may refer to:

- Chityala, Jayashankar Bhupalpally district, a city in Telangana, India
- Chityal, Nalgonda district, a village in Telangana, India
- Chityal, Ranga Reddy district, a village in Telangana, India

== See also ==
- Chityala (disambiguation)
