= Chityala =

Chityala may refer to:

- Chityal (disambiguation)
  - Chityal, Ranga Reddy, Andhra Pradesh, India
  - Chityal, Nalgonda district, Telangana, India
  - Chityal, Warangal, Telangana, India
- Chityala Ailamma (1919–1985), Indian revolutionary leader
