= Devarampally =

- Village
- Country: India
- State: Telangana
- District: Jayashankar Bhupalpally
- Metro: Jayashankar Bhupalpally district

Government
  - Body: Mandal Office

Languages
  - Official: Telugu
- Time zone: UTC+5:30 (IST)
- Planning agency: Panchayat
- Civic agency: Mandal Office

Devarampally is a village and panchayat in Jayashankar Bhupalpally district, Telangana, India. It falls under Kataram mandal.
