= Dwarakapet =

- village
- Location in Telangana, India Dwarakapet (India)
- Coordinates: 18.427761°N 79.605873°E
- Country: India
- State: Telangana
- District: Jayashankar Bhupalpally
- Talukas: Chityala

Population (2011)
  - Total: 2,117 (Dwarakapet & Kundanpally)

Languages
  - Official: Telugu
- Time zone: UTC+5:30 (IST)
- PIN: 506356
- Telephone code: 91 08713
- Vehicle registration: TS 03
- Website: telangana.gov.in

Dwarakapet is a village panchayat in Chityala mandal in Jayashankar Bhupalpally district in the state of Telangana in India.

== Geography ==
Location in Google Maps

Approximate co-ordinates: 18^{o} 25' 39.94", 79^{o} 36' 21.14"
