= Seetharampoor =

- village
- Country: India
- State: Andhra Pradesh
- District: Warangal district
- Mandal: Parkal
- Assembly Constituency: Parkal

Government
  - Ex-MPTC: Lingamurthy Nallella
  - MLA: Moluguri Bikshapathi

Languages
  - Official: Telugu
- Time zone: UTC+5:30 (IST)
- PIN: 506164
- STD CODE: 08713
- visit the page creator at www.manasite.tk

Seetharampoor also called Madharam (according to Grampanchayat) is one of the villages of Parkal Mandal of Warangal district, Telangana, India. It is 2 km away from Parkal and 40 km away from Warangal.

Many different cultures can be found in Seetharampoor. Almost all of the residents are engaged in agriculture. The local language is Telugu, and recently, more residents have become literate.

The largest community here is Munnuru Kepu (Telangana), and the 2nd largest community is Yadava (Golla).
