= Gandra Venkata Ramana Reddy =

Indian politician

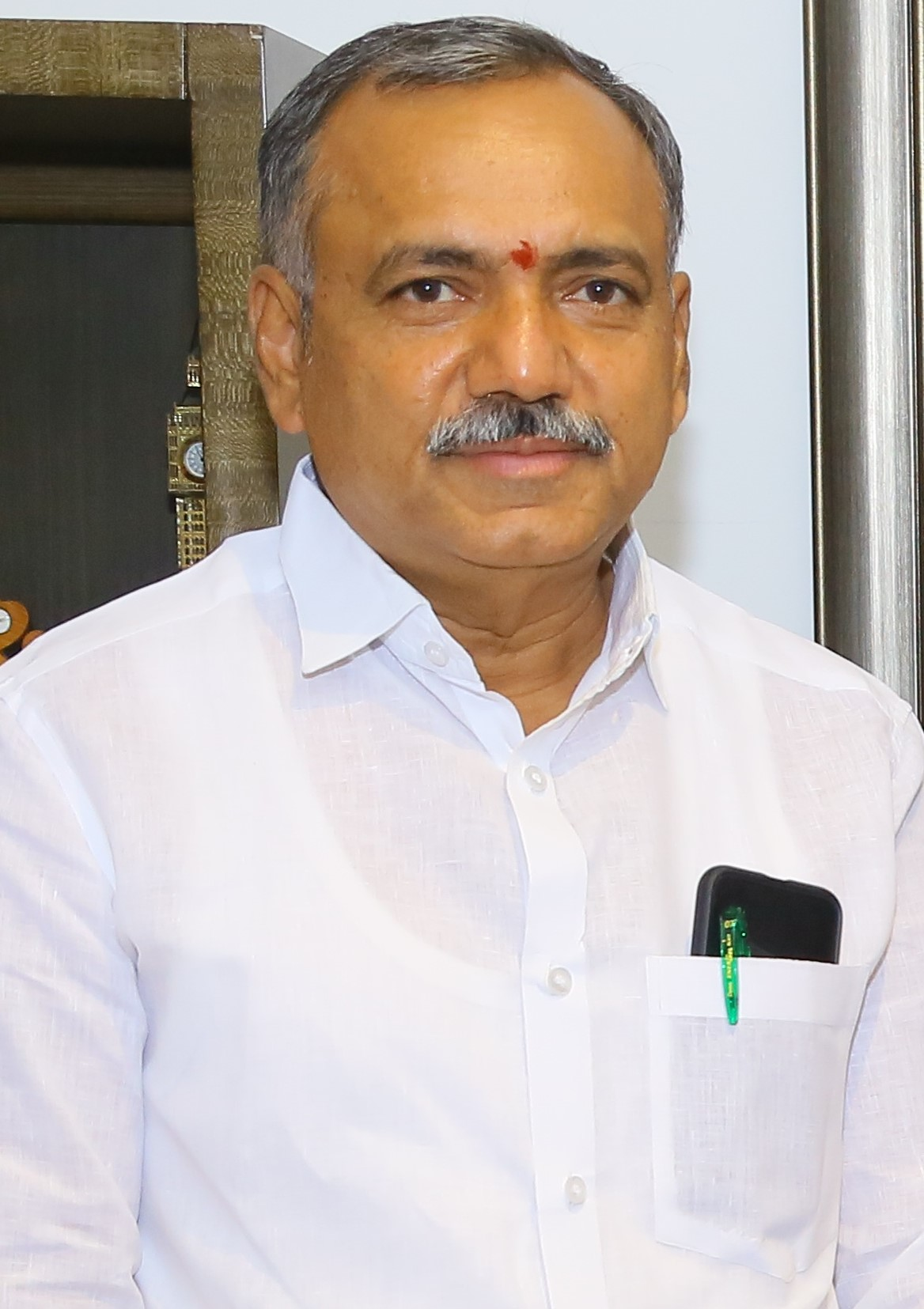
- Portrait of Venkata Ramana Reddy

Member of Legislative Assembly, Telangana
- In office 11 December 2018 – 7 December 2023
- Preceded by: S. Madhusudhana Chary
- Succeeded by: Gandra Satyanarayana Rao
- Constituency: Bhupalpalle

Member of Legislative Assembly Andhra Pradesh
- In office 2009–2014
- Preceded by: Constituency Established
- Succeeded by: Telangana Assembly Created
- Constituency: Bhupalpalle

Personal details
- Party: Bharat Rashtra Samithi
- Other political affiliations: Indian National Congress

Gandra Venkata Ramana Reddy is the Bharat Rashtra Samithi member of the Telangana Legislative Assembly for the Bhupalpalle constituency, and was, before Telangana became a separate state, member of the legislative Assembly for the same constituency, where he acted as Chief Whip from 2009 to 2014.

== Personal life ==
His father is G. Mohan Reddy and he is married to G. Jyothi. He is an agriculturist by profession.
