= Aleeti Ramaiah Pally =

- Village
- Location within Telangana
- Coordinates: 18°20′13″N 79°39′36″E
- Country: India
- State: Telangana
- District: Jayashankar Bhupalpally district
- Time zone: UTC+5:30 (IST)

Aleeti Ramaiah Pally is a village in Jayashankar Bhupalpally district of Telangana, India.

Telugu is the language spoken by the majority of the local citizens and traditional clothes, like the saree and dhoti, are worn alongside modern clothing styles.
