= Thirumalapuram =

- village
- Country: India
- State: Andhra Pradesh
- District: Hanamkonda district

Languages
  - Official: Telugu
- Time zone: UTC+5:30 (IST)
- Vehicle registration: AP-

Thirumalapuram is a Village Panchayat in Chityal mandal of Hanamkonda district, Telangana state, India. Thirumalapuram is also called Thirumalapur. The ancient name for Thirumalapur is Bokkalapadu.

== Agriculture ==
Agriculture is the only occupation for villagers. Due to lack of irrigation facilities, most of the farmers depend on rain water. River - Bokkalapadu-pedda-cheruvu, reserves the rain water. The river water is source of irrigation for around 200 acres (0.81 km^{2}).

Cash Crops: Cotton, Red Chilli, etc. Food Crops: Rice, Corn, Groundnut, Sunflower, Turmeric etc.

== Education ==
There is one government primary school for children up to 5th standard. Children from this village travel to Chityal or Jookal for higher education every day. Many people who have been born in Thirumalapuram settled abroad.

== Transportation ==
There is a RTC bus facility to this village from Parkal and Hanamkonda/Warangal. Buses towards Chityal, Vekatraopalli, Giddemutharam, Tekumatla, Andukuthanda, etc. will go via thirumalapuram. Privately operated vehicles like Jeeps and vans also play important role in people transportation.
