= Pangidipalle =

Pangidipalle Errayyapalli
- village
- Location in Telangana, India
- Coordinates: 18.405107°N 79.633327°E
- Country: India
- State: Andhra Pradesh
- District: Jayashankar Bhupalpally district
- Talukas: Chityal (Warangal)

Population (2001)
  - Total: 1,464

Languages
  - Official: Telugu
- Time zone: UTC+5:30 (IST)
- PIN: 506356
- Telephone code: 91 08713

Pangidipalle is a village panchayat in Chityal mandal in Jayashankar Bhupalpally district in the state of Telangana in India.

== Important information ==
- Kasarla VenkatRaji Reddy was the first Sarpanch of Pangidipalle of Independent India.now leading sarpanch is binaveni shankar. The current MPTC is Madasi Mahender.

== Geography ==
Location in Google Maps

Approximate co-ordinates: 18° 24' 18.39", 79° 37' 59.98"
