= Bavojigudam =

Bavojigudam Bavojigudam
- village
- Country: India
- State: Andhra Pradesh

Languages
  - Official: Telugu
- Time zone: UTC+5:30 (IST)

Bavojigudem is a village located 13 km from Maripeda, the Mandal headquarters, in Jayashankar Bhupalpally district, Andhra Pradesh, India. The neighbouring villages are Venkampadu, Neelukurti, and Giripuram. Previously this village was under the control of the neighbouring village panchayat, Neelukurthi. 15 years ago, the village has got a separate panchayat. The name of the sarpanch is Smt Baby Rani. The prominent people of the village are Sri K Karunakar reddy, M Kesava rao, D Hanumanthu. Recently village tank is repaired and 2 crops are assured in this village.
