= S. Madhusudhana Chary =

Indian politician and legislator

Sirikonda Madhsudana Chary
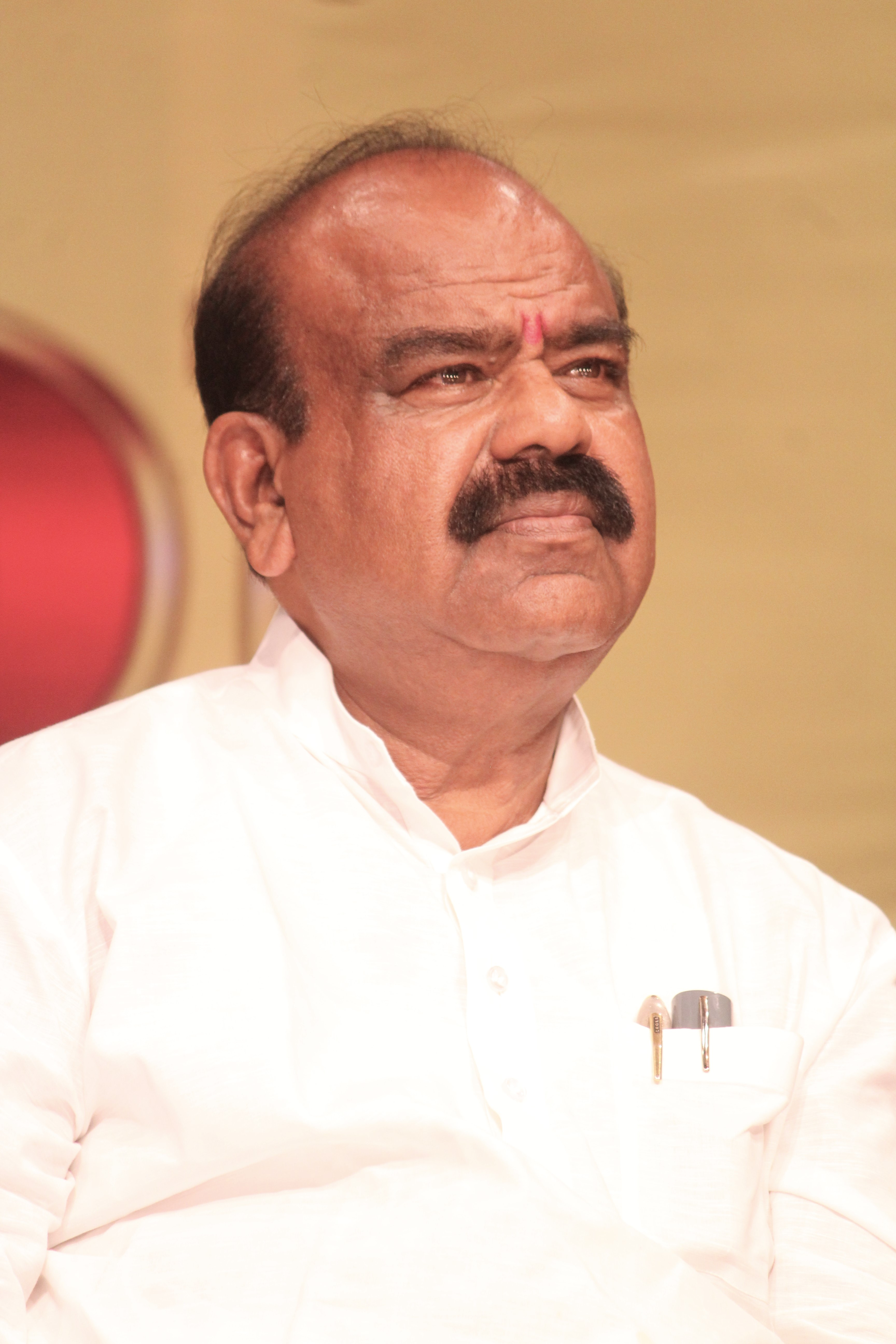

2nd Leader of the Opposition in the Telangana Legislative Council
- Incumbent
- Assumed office 11 September 2024
- Preceded by: D. Srinivas, INC

1st Speaker of Telangana Legislative Assembly
- In office 10 June 2014 – 17 January 2019
- Deputy: Padma Devender Reddy, TRS
- Preceded by: Position Established
- Succeeded by: Pocharam Srinivas Reddy, TRS
- Constituency: Bhupalpalle, Telangana

Personal details
- Born: 13 October 1956 (age 69) Narsakkapalli, Andhra Pradesh, (present-day Warangal district, Telangana) India
- Party: Bharat Rashtra Samithi
- Education: Kakatiya University, MA English (Literature)

Sirikonda Madusudhana Chary (born 1962) is an Indian politician who served as the 1st Speaker of Telangana Legislative Assembly from 9 June 2014 to 16 January 2019 & now serving the LOP in TG Legislative Council. He won from Bhupalapalli constituency in Warangal in 2014 general elections. He is the former MLA of Bhupalapalli Constituency from 2018 Assembly Elections. He belongs to Telangana Rashtra Samithi and is a member of its Politburo. He lost the Telangana Legislative Assembly election held in December 2018.

== Early life ==
He was born in Narsakkapalli village, Parkal, Warangal, Telangana to Venkatanarasaiah. He has an M.A. in English Literature from Kakatiya University, Warangal.

== Career ==
He joined Telugu Desam in 1982 and was an MLA for Telugu Desam in 1994-99 from Shyampet in Warangal district and joined Lakshmi Parvathi's NTR-TDP in 1996 after the crisis. During this term when cotton farmers were committing suicides across Telangana region, he brought a bottle of pesticide to the Legislative Assembly in order to bring to the notice of the highest house in the state. One of the biggest influences in taking the movement of Telangana forward was when Hanmakonda legislator, Dasyam Vinay Bhaskar was forbidden to use the word Telangana on the floor of the Andhra Pradesh Legislative Assembly in 2000 when Telugu Desam was in power.

=== Telangana Rashtra Samithi ===
He started working with K. Chandrashekar Rao 10–12 months before the TRS party was formally launched in April 2001. He lent a great support to the Telangana statehood movement by providing intellectual support. He was a founding member and was made General Secretary in October 2001. He was politburo member and General Secretary. He also worked as a TRS party spokesperson and also very close to Prof. Jayashankar.

He won as an MLA in 2014 General elections from Bhupalapalle defeating former Chief Whip, Gandra Venkataramana Reddy. He lost the election from the same constituency in 2009. He lost in 2018 elections from the same constituency.

=== Speaker of Telangana Legislative Assembly ===
He became the first Speaker of Telangana Assembly. He was elected unanimously on 9 June 2014.

=== Telangana Legislative Council Member ===
Madhusudhana Chary has been nominated to Legislative Council under Governor's quota on 19 November 2021.

=== Personal life ===
He is married to Uma Devi. He has three sons, Pradeep, Prashanth and Kranth.
