= Bhairanpally Massacre =

1948 killing of Hindu villagers in India

- Location: Bhairanpally village in Warangal District of Telangana State, India
- Date: 27 August 1948 (UTC+05:30)
- Target: Civilians
- Attack type: Mass murder
- Deaths: 200
- Perpetrator: Razakars

The Bhairanpally Massacre was the killing of 200 Hindu villagers on 27 August 1948, by the Razakars in the village of Bhairanpally in present-day Telangana state of India.

== Background ==
India became independent from the British Raj on 15 August 1947. Soon after, the people of Hyderabad State began a civil revolt known as the Telangana Rebellion. They were agitating for a merger with India and against the authoritarian rule of the Nizam of Hyderabad and also against them having to pay Jiziya (religious tax to be paid by non-muslims in an Islamic state).The Nizam's private army, the Razakars, attempted to quell the uprising of people demanding the merger of Nizam dominion into the Indian Union. They marched the length and breadth of Telangana, plundering and looting villages.

== Attack on the village and massacre ==
From June 1948, the Razakars tried thrice to enter Bhairanpally village but were repelled by the villagers using slings and other traditional weapons. However, in August they gained entry from the Razakars. The villagers took refuge in the fortress in the village and were able to kill some of the Razakars. However, the defenders were overwhelmed and killed, after which the Razakars went on a rampage raping women, looting their gold ornaments and even stripping the women naked and making them play bathukamma in front of the dead bodies. The villagers were made to stand two to three in a line and shot with a single bullet to save bullets. In the massacre of 27 August and the preceding days, 200 people were killed, as per historians and village elders.

== Legacy ==
There is a memorial on the outskirts of the village with the names of those killed engraved on it.

Champion (2025 film), a 2025 Telugu language film set against the backdrop of the Bhairanpally Massacre and 1947 Indian independence struggle.

== See also ==
- Parkala massacre
