= Kamanpur =

- Village
- Location in Telangana, India Kamanpur (India)
- Coordinates: 18.6667°N 79.5000°E
- Country: India
- State: Telangana
- District: Peddapalli
- Talukas: Kamanpur

Area
  - Total: 7.59 km^{2} (2.93 sq mi)
- Elevation: 155 m (509 ft)

Population
  - Total: 2,384
  - Rank: 5000
  - Density: 314/km^{2} (814/sq mi)

Languages
  - Official: Telugu
- Time zone: UTC+5:30 (IST)
- PIN: 505188
- Telephone code: 08728
- Vehicle registration: TS22
- Website: kamanpur.blogspot.in

Kamanpur is a Mandal in Peddapalli district of the Indian state of Telangana. It is located in Kamanpur mandal of Peddapalli revenue division.

== Geography ==
Kamanpur is bordered by Ramagundam Urban mandal towards the North, Peddapally mandal towards the West, Manthani mandal towards the East, and Kalva Srirampur mandal towards the South. It has an average elevation of 155 meters (511 feet).
