= Pandavula Gutta =

Ancient cave in Telangana, India

Coordinates: 18°15′23″N 79°49′05″E

Pandavula Gutta (also Pandavula Guttalu or Pandavula Guhalu) is an ancient geological site and cave located near Kothapally village in Regonda mandal of Jayashankar Bhupalpally district in the Indian state of Telangana. It was designated as the only geoheritage site of Telangana. Telangana tourism and Forest department developed the entire area into a significant ecotourism centre. The site is situated 55 k.m from Warangal.

== History ==
The cave known for historic rock paintings in the Deccan plateau, older than the Himalayan hills. Palaeolithic cave paintings have been found at Pandavula Gutta. The cave was first discovered in 1990 by K. Ramkrishna Rao and S.S. Rangacharyulu, officials of Archaeological Survey of India, Hyderabad. There was habitation from the Mesolithic period, i.e. 4,000-20,500 years old. Rock art paintings depict wild animals like Bison, Antelope, Tiger, as well as swastika symbol, geometrical designs as circles, squares and various ancient weapons are there. Along with the pre-historic paintings, there are many inscriptions of Rashtrakutas period. Mythologically it is believed that the Pandavas, stayed there for a while during their twelve years exile at Vana Parva.
