= Narsakkapalli =

- Village
- Country: India
- State: Telangana
- District: Hanamkonda
- Mandal: Parkal

Narsakkapalli is a village in Parkal mandal of Hanamkonda district in Telangana state, India. It is situated 4 kilometres (2.5 mi) away from Parkal on the bypass road to Kamalapur.
