= Maha Mutharam =

Maha Mutharam is a village and a mandal in Jayashankar Bhupalpally district in the state of Telangana in India.
