= Parkala massacre =

1947 massacre in Parkala, Telangana

Parkala Massacre
- Location: Parkala
- Date: 2 September 1947 (UTC+05:30)
- Target: Civilians
- Attack type: Mass murder
- Deaths: 22
- Injuries: 150
- Perpetrator: Razakars

The Parkala Massacre was the killing of 22 Protestors on 2 September 1947, by the Razakars in the town of Parkala. The massacre suppressed the popular movement for India to annex the Hyderabad State.

== History ==
India became independent from the British Raj on 15 August 1947. Immediately after, the people of Hyderabad State began a civil revolt, agitating for a merger with India and against the authoritarian rule of the Nizam of Hyderabad. Farmers in the town of Parkala also took part in the resistance.

On 2 September 1947, they prohibited all gatherings in Warangal, but more than 1,500 people from nearby villages ignored this diktat and came together to hoist the flag of India. According to eyewitnesses, the Razakars fired indiscriminately, killing 22 people and seriously wounding over 150. The Razakars killed three people by tying them to a tree and shooting them. In the nearby village of Laxmipuram, they sexually assaulted women, looted money, and set the huts ablaze.

== Legacy ==
Years later, Indian Prime Minister P. V. Narasimha Rao deemed the Parkala Massacre as the "Jallianwala Bagh of the south". The Jallianwala Bagh massacre was a major turning point for the Indian independence movement when a British general, Reginald Dyer, marched into Jallianwala Bagh and ordered his troops to fire on peaceful protesters, killing 379 and injuring 1,200.

On 17 September 2003, Vidyasagar Rao, a politician from Telangana, built a memorial named the "Amaradhamam", in tribute to the victims of the massacre. The memorial was inaugurated by the then Indian Deputy Prime Minister L. K. Advani. According to Rao, the massacre was an issue neglected by the government, and the memorial honored the people of Telangana in their struggle for the liberation of Hyderabad. The memorial has been used as a platform by the Bharatiya Janata Party to demand that the government recognize 17 September as "Liberation Day" of Telangana.

== See also ==
- Bhairanpally Massacre
