= Kota Gullu =

- Ghanpur Temples
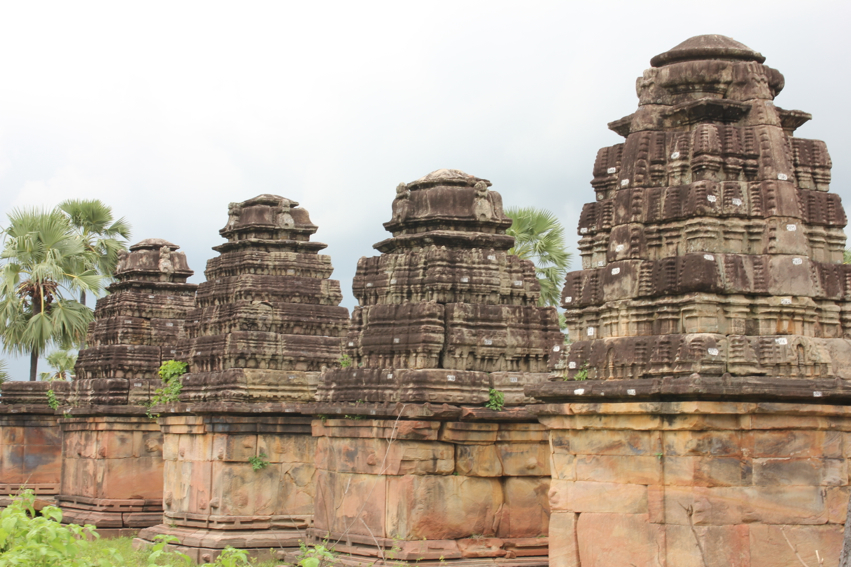
- Kota Gullu at Ghanpur

- Location in India

Religion
- Affiliation: Hinduism
- District: Warangal
- Deity: Shiva

Location
- Location: Ghanpur
- State: Telangana
- Country: India
- Interactive map of Kota Gullu
- Coordinates: 18.1840°N 79.5220°E

Architecture
- Temple: 20

Ghanpur temples, popularly known as Kota Gullu, are a group of 12th-century stone temples that are located in Ghanpur near Warangal in Telangana, India. They are located 9 km northwest of the more famous Ramappa Temple in Palampet.

== History ==
Kota Gullu were constructed by King Ganapatideva, the king of Kakatiya dynasty who ruled during the period of 1199–1260 CE. It suffered major damage either through the attacks from the Muslim armies between 14th and 16th centuries CE, or through a major earthquake in the region in 17th century CE.

An inscription on a slab at the temple refers to Ganapathi Reddy who installed Lord Ganapateshwara and donated land during the reign of Ganapatideva in the cyclic year of “Jaya Nama Samvatsara, Vaisakha Sudha Trayodasi, Bruhaspati Vasaram” (corresponding to 1234-35 CE).

== Architecture ==
Kota Gullu comprises about 22 temples, all varying in size and design that exhibits the marvelous architectural work by Kakatiyas.

Temples are constructed within a double-walled stone enclosure. Of all these temples, the main temple, dedicated to Lord Shiva, is the most admirable. There is yet another temple that is dedicated to Shiva, to the north of the main temple, that has the same appearance. The other shrine of the temple consists of Garbhagriha and Antarala.

The most striking feature of the temples is the Sabha mandapa porches. Two madanikas are seen on the northern side of the portico. The eastern and southern porticos are embellished with several mythical figures of Gaja Kesari, half-human-half-lion form riding on elephant, and horse-head lion back on elephant.

There are nearby remnants of sculptures depicting Nandi, dancers, musicians and others like temple roof, decorative ceiling, sculpted walls, bas reliefs, etc. Many statues were also discovered in the vicinity of the temple grounds and have been put on display for visitors and tourists coming to view the temple.

== Gallery ==
Ruins of Kota Gullu
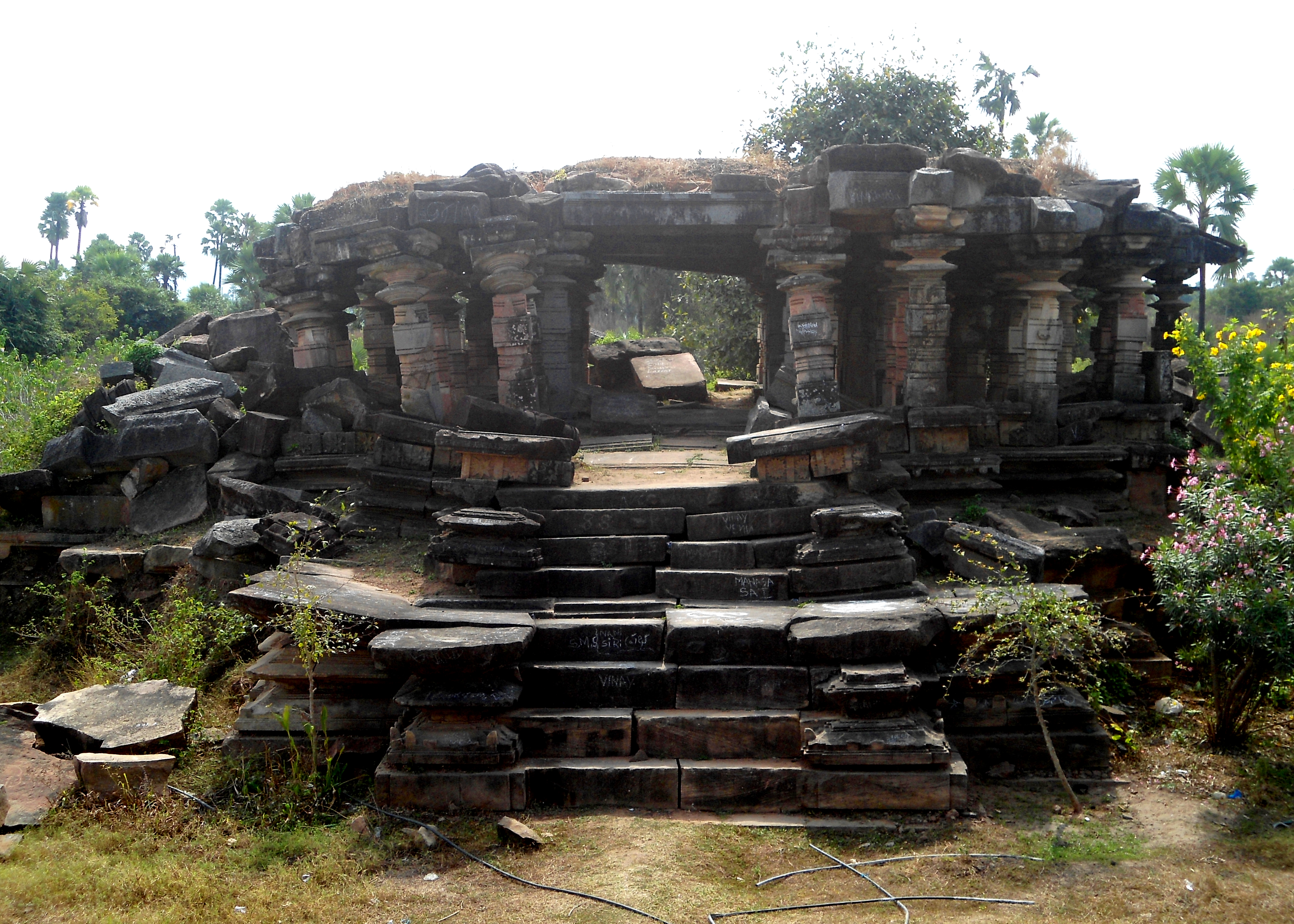

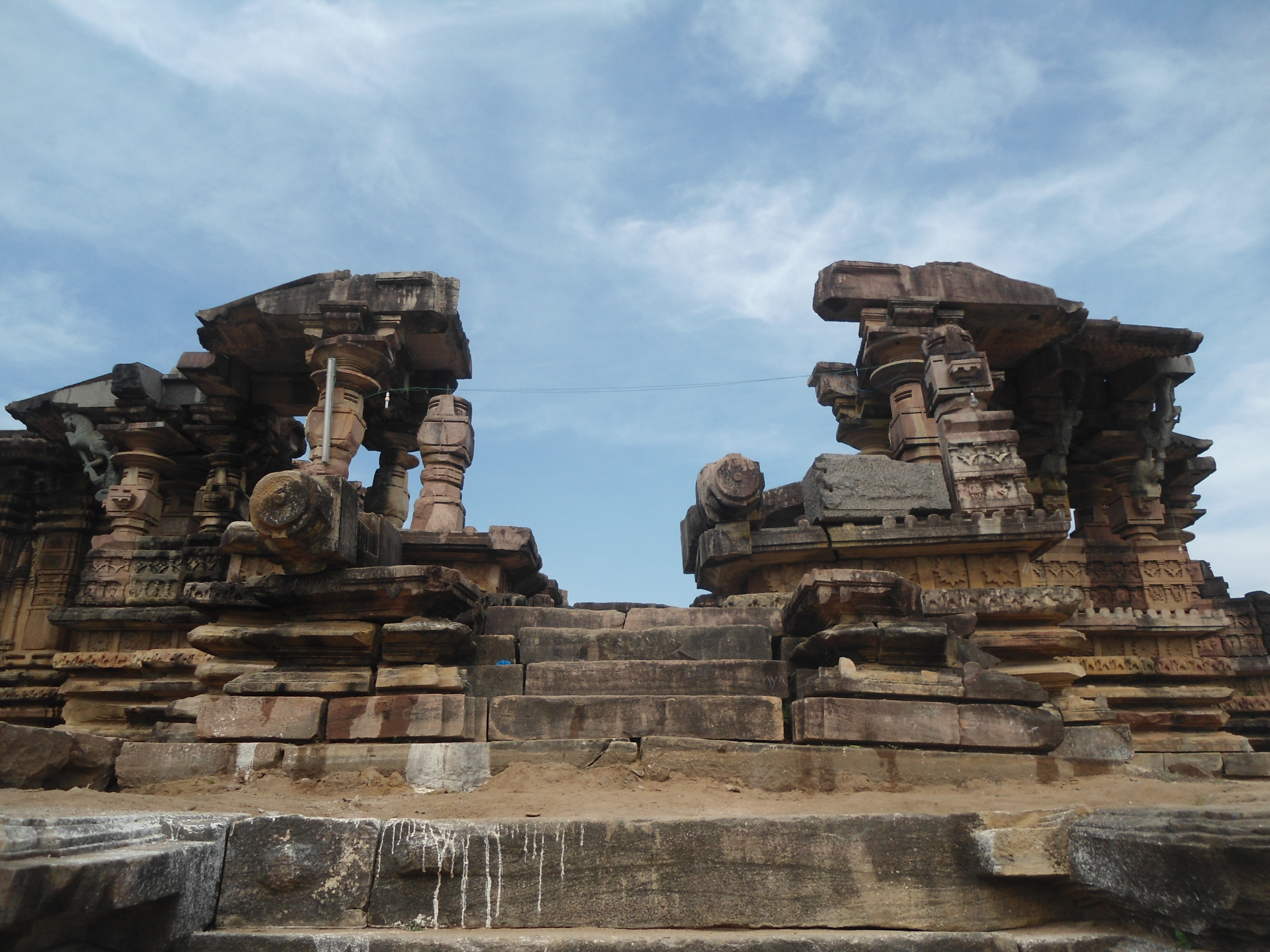

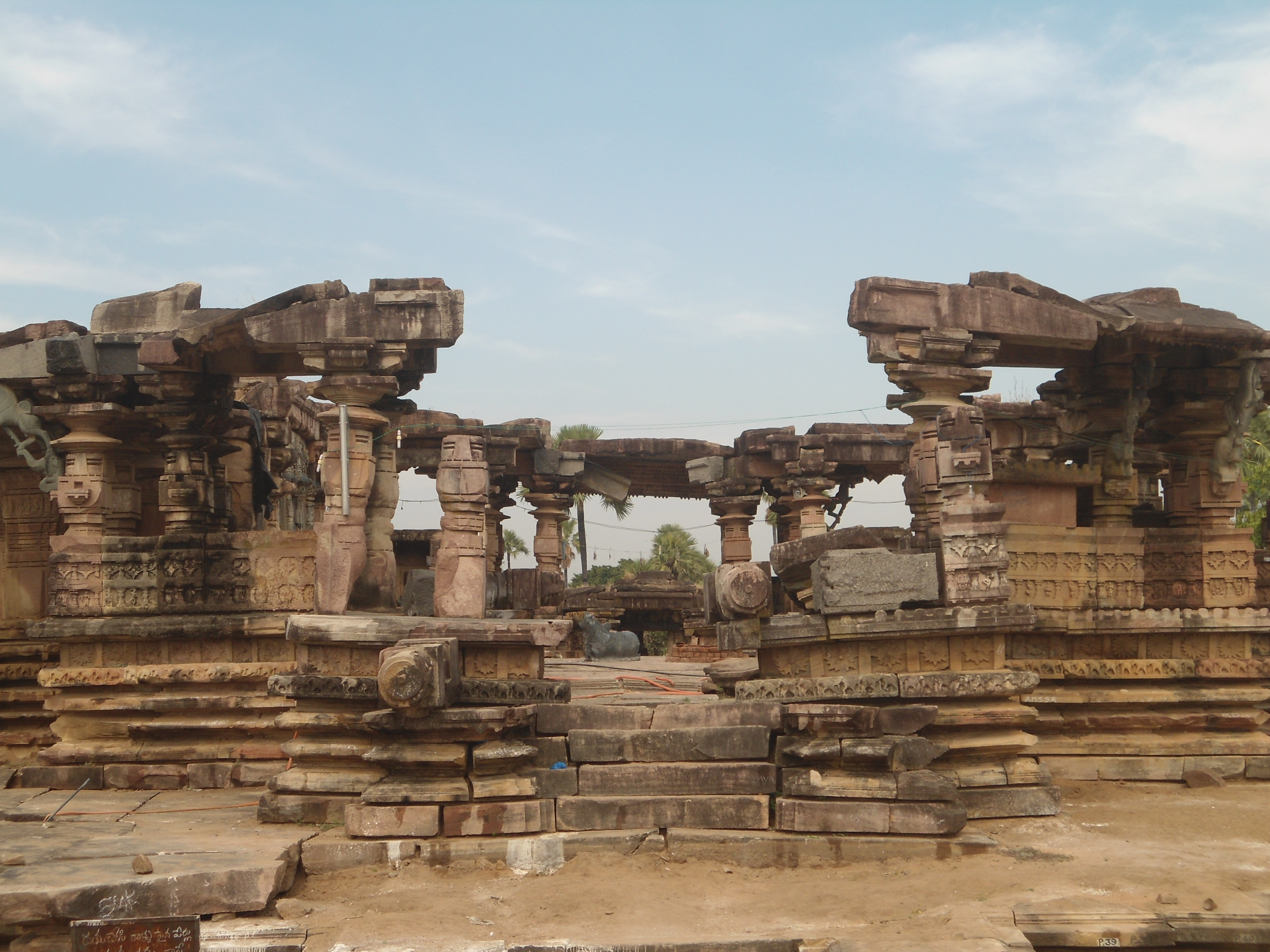

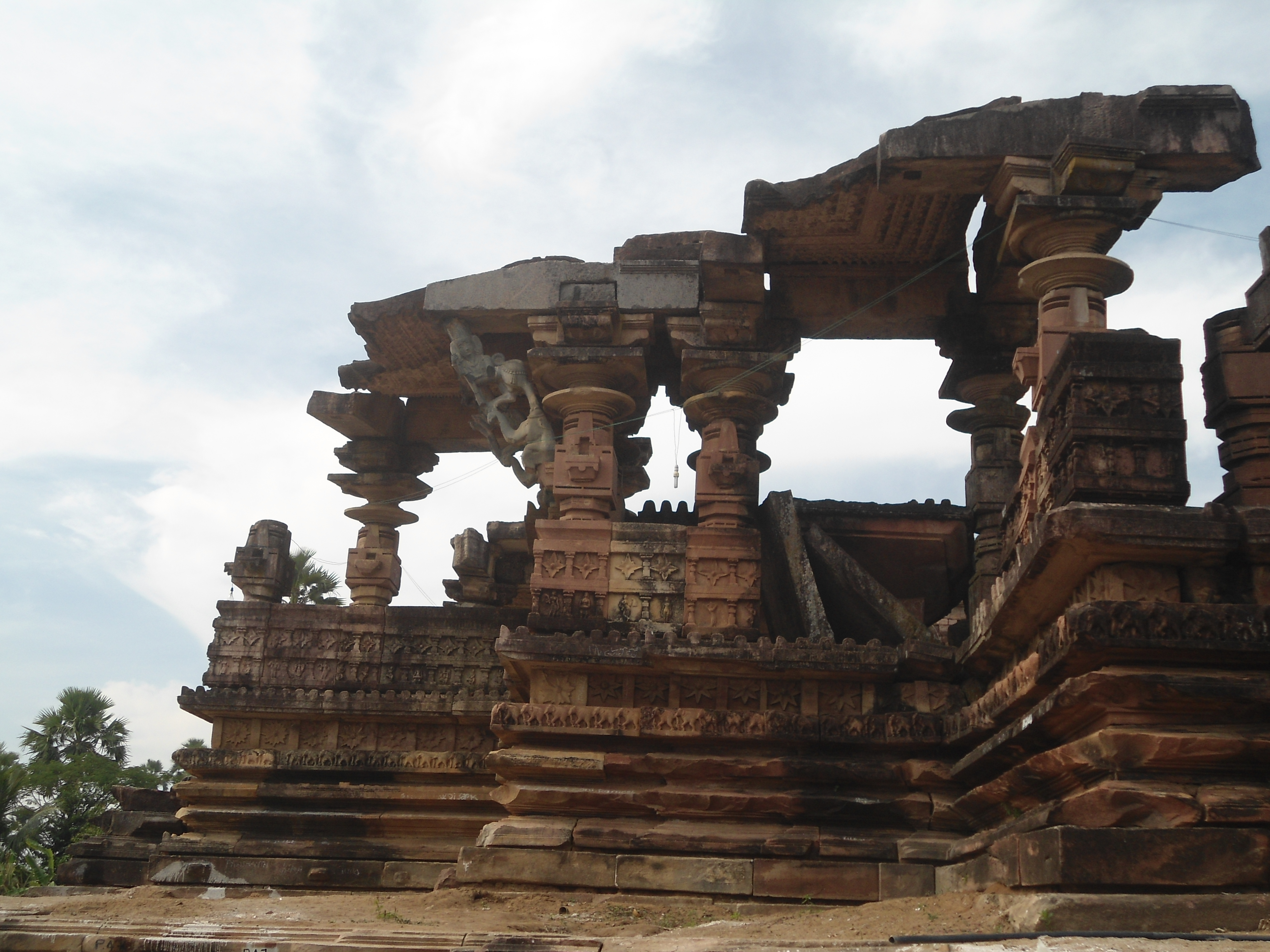

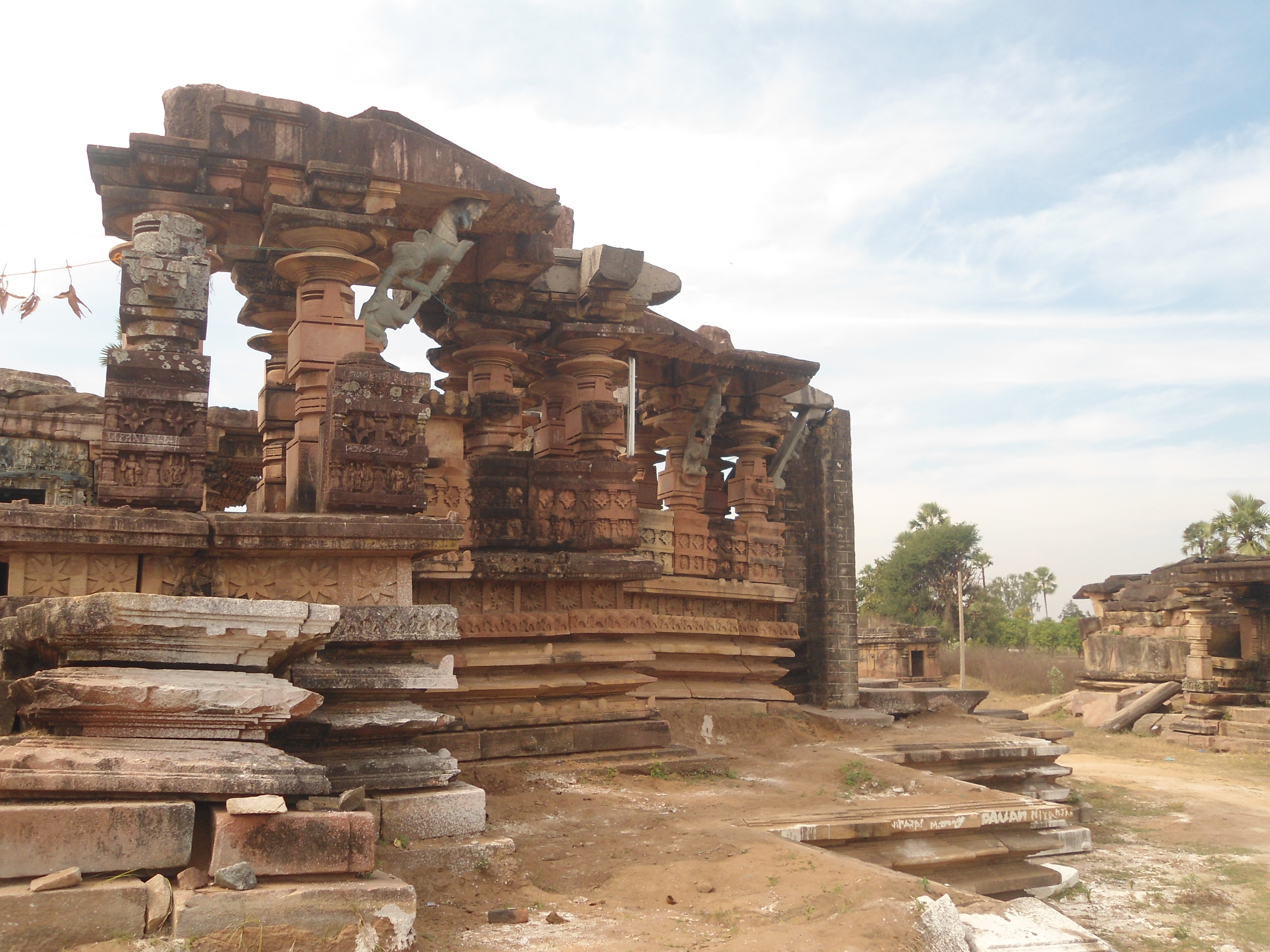
