= Tekumatla =

Mulug
- City
- Country: India
- State: Telangana
- District: Jayashankar

Government
  - Type: Municipal
  - Rank: 1st In District

Population
  - Total: 45,600
  - Rank: 2 In District

Languages
  - Official: Telugu
- Time zone: UTC+5:30 (IST)
- PIN: 506343
- Vehicle registration: TS-25

Tekumatla is a village and mandal in Jayashankar Bhupalpally district of the Indian state of Telangana.
