= Mogullapalle =

- village
- Interactive map of Mogullapalle
- Coordinates: 16°04′N 79°16′E
- Country: India
- State: Telangana
- District: Jayashankar
- Talukas: Mogullapalle

Languages
  - Official: Telugu
- Time zone: UTC+5:30 (IST)
- Vehicle registration: TS 03
- Website: telangana.gov.in

Mogullapalle is a village and a mandal in Jayashankar Bhupalpally district in the Indian state of Telangana.

== Geography ==
Mogulapalli is a mandal in Jayashankar Bhupalapalli district in Telangana. Villages include Banglapally, Rangapuram, Isspeta, Motlapalli, Mulakalapalli, Korikshala and Chinthalapalli ganeshpally peddakomatipally parlapally

== Economy ==
Shops include supermarkets, bike showroom and SBI bank.
