= Malharrao =

Mandal in Jayashankar Bhupalpally, Telangana, India

Coordinates: 18°38′37″N 79°52′13″E

Malharrao is a mandal in Jayashankar Bhupalpally district of the Telangana state in India.
