= Kataram =

Coordinates: 16°31′N 77°56′E

- Village
- Interactive map of Kataram
- Country: India
- State: Telangana
- District: Jayashankar
- Talukas: Kataram

Languages
  - Official: Telugu
- Time zone: UTC+5:30 (IST)
- PIN: 505503
- Vehicle registration: TS
- Website: http://manamanthani.com

Kataram is a village in Kataram mandal of Jayashankar Bhupalpally district in the state of Telangana in India.
