= D. Sridhar Babu =

Indian politician (born 1969)

Duddilla Sridhar Babu
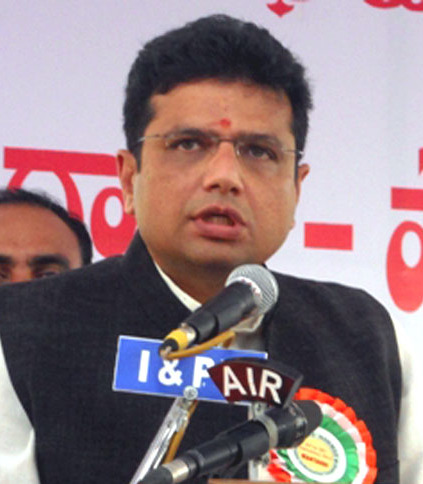
- Sridhar Babu in 2012

Minister for Information Technology, Electronics, Communications, Industries and Commerce Government of Telangana
- Incumbent
- Assumed office 7 December 2023
- Governor: Tamilisai Soundararajan (2023-2024); C.P. Radhakrishnan (Additional charge) (2024); Jishnu Dev Varma (2024-2026); Shiv Pratap Shukla ( 2026–present)
- Chief Minister: Anumula Revanth Reddy
- Preceded by: K. T. Rama Rao

Minister for Legislative Affairs Government of Telangana
- Incumbent
- Assumed office 7 December 2023
- Governor: Tamilisai Soundararajan (2023-2024); C.P. Radhakrishnan (Additional charge) (2024-present)
- Chief Minister: Anumula Revanth Reddy
- Preceded by: Vemula Prashanth Reddy

Member of Telangana Legislative Assembly
- Incumbent
- Assumed office 2018
- Preceded by: Putta Madhu
- Constituency: Manthani

Minister for Civil Supplies & Legislative Affairs Government of Andhra Pradesh
- In office 25 November 2010 - 2 January 2014
- Governor: E. S. L. Narasimhan
- Chief Minister: Kiran Kumar Reddy
- Preceded by: Sake Sailajanath
- Succeeded by: Chief Minister of Andhra Pradesh

Minister for Higher Education and NRI Affairs Government of Andhra Pradesh
- In office 25 May 2009 - 24 November 2010
- Governor: N. D. Tiwari; E. S. L. Narasimhan
- Chief Minister: Y. S. Rajasekhara Reddy; Konijeti Rosaiah
- Preceded by: Dharmapuri Srinivas
- Succeeded by: Damodar Raja Narasimha

Member of Andhra Pradesh Legislative Assembly
- In office 1999 - 2014
- Preceded by: Chandrupatla Ram Reddy
- Succeeded by: Telangana Assembly Created
- Constituency: Manthani

Personal details
- Born: 30 May 1969 (age 57) Manthani, Telangana, India
- Party: Indian National Congress
- Spouse: Shailaja Ramaiyer
- Children: 2

Duddilla Sridhar Babu (born 30 May 1969) is an Indian politician from Indian National Congress and is a member of the Telangana Assembly from Manthani Constituency, Peddapalli district which he won for the fifth time as MLA in December 2023. He is a senior Minister in the Telangana Government holding the crucial portfolios of Information Technology, Electronics & Communication, Industry & Commerce and Legislative Affairs.

Sridhar Babu is one of the senior most leaders in the Telangana Congress Party, and was an AICC All India Congress Committee Secretary attached to the AICC General Secretary, in charge of Karnataka from July 2022 to August 2024. He was the Minister for Civil Supplies, Consumer Affairs, Legal Metrology, and Legislative Affairs in the United Government of Andhra Pradesh prior to that state being divided.

== Background ==
Duddilla Sridhar Babu is the fourth of six children of former Speaker of the Andhra Pradesh Assembly, the Indian National Congress politician Sri D. Sripada Rao. He graduated with B.A, L.L.B. from the University of Delhi, and M. A. Political Science from University of Hyderabad. Babu was a practicing lawyer at Andhra Pradesh High Court before entering politics in 1999 following the assassination of his father by Naxalites. At that time he decided that it was incumbent on him to continue the work of his father in the Manthani constituency and more specifically in the Karimnagar district in which it is situated.

== Personal life ==
Sridhar Babu was a keen cricketer as a student, he represented Nizam College and the University of Hyderabad. Sridhar Babu is married to Ms Shailaja Ramaiyer an Indian Administrative Service officer of the Telangana Cadre, while being a MLA. The couple have two children (one son, one daughter).

== Career ==
Sridhar Babu is known for carrying out developmental works in the Backward region of Manthani ever since he became a Member of the Legislative Assembly and is believed to be always close to the people of the region.

=== First term (1999–2004) ===
Sridhar Babu won on the Congress ticket from Manthani in the 1999 elections, though his Congress party was relegated to sitting in the opposition. He defeated his nearest rival Chandrupatla Ram Reddy by a margin of over 15,000 votes.

=== Second term (2004–2009) ===
By the time Y. S. Rajasekhar Reddy undertook his padayatra in 2003, Sridhar Babu was the Karimnagar district party president. In the 2004 elections, in which the Congress Party gained power, he defeated the TDP candidate, Somarapu Satyanarayana, by a margin of 42,560 votes. He became a Government Whip in the 12th Telangana.

=== Third term (2009–2014) ===
He was re-elected in the 2009 Assembly Elections defeating Putta Madhu of the erstwhile Praja Rajyam Party by a margin of over 13,000 votes. He was the only Congress MLA to be re-elected in 2009 from Karimnagar district, amidst a strong showing from an alliance of the Telangana Rashtra Samithi and Telugu Desam Party.

Babu was appointed a member of Y. S. Reddy's cabinet in May 2009 as minister for Higher Education and NRI affairs. After serving the ministry for 1.5 years he moved to the Civil Supplies and Legislative affairs ministry in Kiran Kumar Reddy's cabinet. He resigned from the cabinet on 2 January 2014 after Reddy divested him of his Legislative Affairs portfolio when the Andhra Pradesh Reorganisation Bill, which concerns the creation of a separate Telangana state, was being discussed in the Assembly.

=== Fourth term (2018–2023) ===
Sridhar Babu won a hard-fought election in 2018, and won with a majority of 16,230 votes against his TRS rival. The Telangana CM KCR had called for an early election in September 2018 by dissolving the assembly a good 8 months before its tenure throwing the opposition parties into a tizzy. The Congress party had high hopes of dethroning the ruling TRS and allied itself with the TDP, TJS and CPI to forge a grand alliance. However, the TRS rode back to power and Sridhar Babu was one of the only 19 MLAs who won on the Congress party ticket.

=== Fifth term (2023-) ===
The Congress party launched a comprehensive campaign and AICC leaders Rahul Gandhi and Priyanka Gandhi campaigned in Telangana and Smt. Sonia Gandhi addressed a mega rally in the run up to the Telangana election where she announced 6 guarantees. Basis the 6 guarantees, the party prepared a robust Manifesto which was spearheaded by Sridhar babu Sridhar Babu contesting for the 6th time as MLA from Manthani, and as only one of the 5 sitting MLAs from the Congress party in Telangana ran a well planned election campaign focusing on the promises made by the Congress party in its manifesto and the 6 guarantees announced to achieve a Samajika Telangana (Social Telangana)-which was based on Social justice and Inclusive politics, to counter the Bangaru Telangana ( Golden Telangana) claim by BRS. In the end, he won with a handsome margin of 31380 votes inflicting a defeat on Putta Madhukar of the ruling BRS for the third time. The state witnessed a stunning defeat of the ruling BRS which had to contend only with 39 seats, and the Congress party romped home with a simple majority of 64 seats.

== Government of Telangana ==
D Sridhar Babu was sworn in as a Minister in the Government of Telangana on 7 December 2023 along with 11 other ministers including CM Revanth Reddy and Dy CM Mallu Bhatti Vikramarka

He is currently holding the portfolio of Information Technology, Electronics & Communication, Industry & Commerce and Legislative Affairs.

=== Election statistics ===
Year	Constituency	Party	Votes	%	Opponent	Opponent Party	Opponent Votes	%	Result	Margin	%
2023	Manthani	INC	103,822	52.82	Putta Madhu	BRS	72,442	36.86	Won	31,380	15.96
2018	Manthani	INC	89,045	50.41	Putta Madhu	TRS	72,815	41.22	Won	16,230	9.19
2014	Manthani	INC	64,667	38.00	Putta Madhu	TRS	84,037	49.38	Lost	-19,370	-11.38
2009	Manthani	INC	63,770	42.27	Putta Madhu	PRP	50,561	33.51	Won	13,209	8.76
2004	Manthani	INC	79,318	59.23	Somarapu Satyanarayana	TDP	36,758	27.45	Won	42,560	31.78
1999	Manthani	INC	65,884	54.31	Chandrupatla Ram Reddy	TDP	50,613	41.73	Won	15,271	12.58

== Offices held ==
Office	Organization	Tenure
Secretary, Coordination Committee	Telangana Pradesh Congress Committee	(2014–2015)
Chairman, Manifesto Committee	Telangana Pradesh Election Committee	(2014–2014)
Minister for Civil Supplies, Consumer Affairs, Legal Metrology	Government of Andhra Pradesh	(2010-2014)
Minister for Legislative Affairs	Government of Andhra Pradesh	(2010 - 2014)
In Charge District Minister and Chairman DRC(District Review Committee)	Ranga Reddy District, Andhra Pradesh	(2009-2014)
Minister for Higher Education and NRI Affairs	Government of Andhra Pradesh	(2009-2010)
President	District Congress Committee, Karimnagar, Andhra Pradesh	(2004-2012)
Board Member	Tirumala Tirupati Devasthanam (TTD), Tirupati, Andhra Pradesh	(2004-2006)
Government Whip	12th Andhra Pradesh Legislative Assembly	(2004-2009)
Chairman	Cricket Association of Telangana, CAT	(2014–2016)
Vice president	Telangana Pradesh Congress Committee	(2016–2021)
Secretary	All India Congress Committee	(2022–Till date)
Minister for IT, E&C, Industries & Commerce, Legislative Affairs	Government of Telangana	(2023–Till date)
