= Jayashankar Bhupalpally district =

- District of Telangana
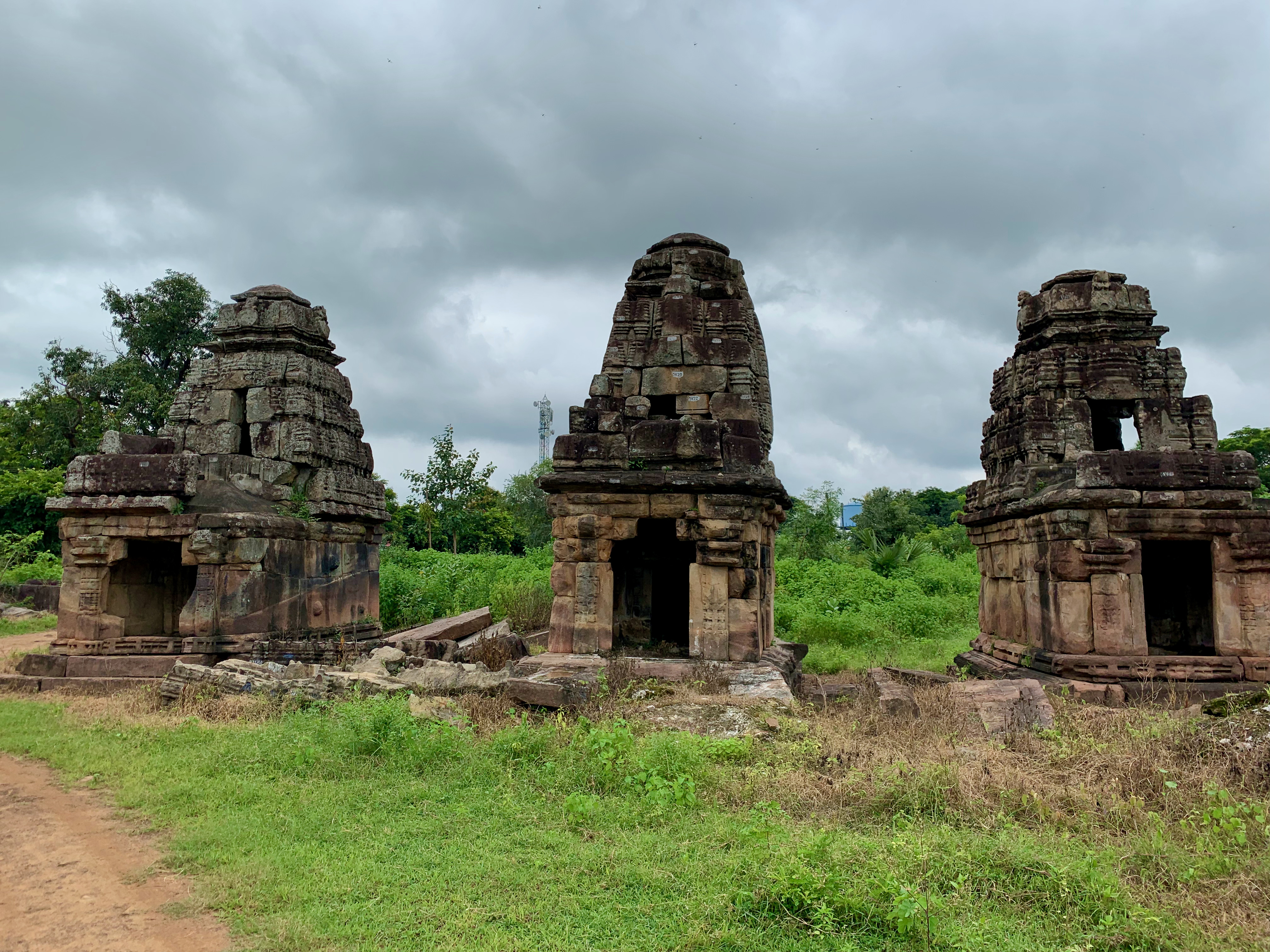
- Kota Gullu, Ghanpur
- Interactive map of Jayashankar Bhupalpally district
- Country: India
- State: Telangana
- Named for: Kothapalli Jayashankar
- Headquarters: Bhupalpally
- Mandalas: 19

Government
  - District collector: Bhavesh Mishra IAS
  - Assembly constituencies: Bhupalpalle, Manthani

Area
  - Total: 2,293 km^{2} (885 sq mi)

Population (2011)
  - Total: 416,763
  - Density: 181.8/km^{2} (470.7/sq mi)
  - Urban: 42,387
- Time zone: UTC+05:30 (IST)
- Vehicle registration: TG–25
- Major highways: NH363
- Website: bhoopalapally.telangana.gov.in

Jayashankar Bhupalpally district is a district in the Indian state of Telangana. The district headquarters are located at Bhupalpally. The district share boundaries with Karimnagar, Mancherial, Peddapalli, Hanamkonda, Warangal, and Mulugu districts and with the state boundary of Maharashtra and Chhattisgarh. The world's largest multi-stage lift irrigation project Kaleshwaram Lift Irrigation Project is in Jayashankar Bhupalpally District and Jayashankar Bhupalpally District falls Under naxal affected district as per Red corridor.

== Geography ==
The district is spread over an area of 6,175 square kilometres (2,384 sq mi). Jayashankar district is bounded on north by Mancherial district and Gadchiroli district of Maharashtra, on the northeast by Bijapur district of Chhattisgarh, on the southeast by Mulugu district, on the south by Warangal district, on west by Hanamkonda and Peddapalli districts.

== Demographics ==
Religion in Jayashankar Bhupalpally district (2011)
Hinduism	96.23%
Islam	2.95%
Christianity	0.64%
Other or not stated	0.18%

As of 2011 Census of India, the district has a population of 416,763. 207,998 are males and 208,765 females, a sex ratio of 1004 females per 1000 males. 42,387 (10.17%) lived in urban areas. Scheduled Castes and Scheduled Tribes made up 92,017 (22.08%) and 37,192 (8.92%) of the population respectively.

Languages of Jayashankar Bhupalpally district (2011)
1. Telugu (95.3%)
2. Lambadi (1.76%)
3. Urdu (1.59%)
4. Others (1.31%)

At the time of the 2011 census, 95.34% of the population spoke Telugu, 1.76% Lambadi and 1.59% Urdu as their first language.

== Administrative divisions ==
The district will have two revenue divisions of Bhupalpally and Kataram is sub-divided into 11 mandals.

Bhavesh Mishra, IAS is the present collector of the district.

The below table categorizes mandals into their respective revenue divisions in the district:

== Mandals ==
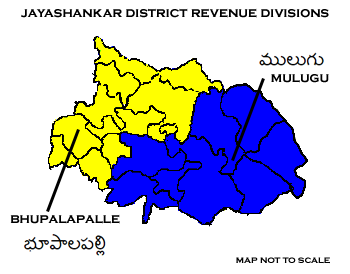
Jayashankar District Revenue divisions

The below table categorizes mandals into their respective revenue divisions in the district:

Sl. No	Name of the District	Mandals in the District including New Mandals	Name of the Revenue Division	Name of the Erstwhile District	Name of the Erstwhile Revenue Division
1	Jayashankar District HQ at Bhupalpalli) *	Bhupalpally	Bhupalpally	Warangal	Mulugu
2	Jayashankar District HQ at Bhupalpalli) *	Ghanpur (Mulugu)	Bhupalpally	Warangal	Mulugu
3	Jayashankar District HQ at Bhupalpalli) *	Regonda	Bhupalpally	Warangal	Mulugu
4	Jayashankar District HQ at Bhupalpalli) *	Mogullapally	Bhupalpally	Warangal	Mulugu
5	Jayashankar District HQ at Bhupalpalli) *	Chityal	Bhupalpally	Warangal	Mulugu
6	Jayashankar District HQ at Bhupalpalli) *	Tekumatla (New)	Bhupalpally	Warangal	Mulugu
7	Jayashankar District HQ at Bhupalpalli) *	Malhalrao	Kataram	Karimnagar	Manthani
8	Jayashankar District HQ at Bhupalpalli) *	Kataram	Kataram	Karimnagar	Manthani
9	Jayashankar District HQ at Bhupalpalli) *	Mahadevpur	Kataram	Karimnagar	Manthani
10	Jayashankar District HQ at Bhupalpalli) *	Palimela (New)	Kataram	Karimnagar	Manthani
11	Jayashankar District HQ at Bhupalpalli) *	Mahamutharam	Kataram	Karimnagar	Manthani
12		Kotthapellygori (New)	Bhupalpally	Warangal	Mulugu

== Assembly Constituencies ==
There are 2 assembly constituencies in Bhupalapally district. They are Bhupalapalle, Manthani

Currently Gandra Sathya Narayana Rao is MLA of Bhupalpally and D. Sridhar Babu is The MLA of Manthani.

== See also ==
- List of districts in Telangana
- Pandavula Gutta
