= Regonda =

- Mandal
- Location in Telangana, India Regonda (India)
- Coordinates: 18.245256°N 79.769367°E
- Country: India
- State: Telangana
- District: Jayashankar
- Talukas: Regonda
- Elevation: 302 m (991 ft)

Languages
  - Official: Telugu
- Time zone: UTC+5:30 (IST)
- PIN: 506348
- Vehicle registration: TS
- Website: telangana.gov.in

Regonda is a mandal and a mandal in Jayashankar Bhupalpally district in the state of Telangana, India. It has buildings from the period of the Kakatiya dynasty.

Regonda mandal comprises 49 villages and 27 panchayats. Jamshedbaigpet is the smallest village and Regonda is the biggest, with the remainder being:

- Bhagirthipet
- Chennapur
- Chinnakodepaka
- Dammannapet
- Jaggaiahpet
- Kanaparthy
- Kodavatancha
- Konaraopet
- Kothapallegori
- Pochampally
- Lingala
- Madathapalle
- Ponagandla
- Ramannaguda
- Repaka
- Sultanpur
- Tirumalagiri
- Damaranchapally
- Gudepalle
- Kanaparthy
- Narayanapur
- Nizampalli
- Rajakkapally
- Ranagaiahpalli
- Regonda
- Repaka Palli
- Roopireddi Palli
- Royapalli
- Sulthanpur

== Bus stations ==
- Rangaiahpally
- Pochampally road
- Lingala X Road
- Sri Narasimha Swamy Temple(kodavatancha)
- Repaka
- Regonda
- Chennapur/Roopireddy palli
