= Ghanpur, Mulugu district =

Ghanpur
- Village
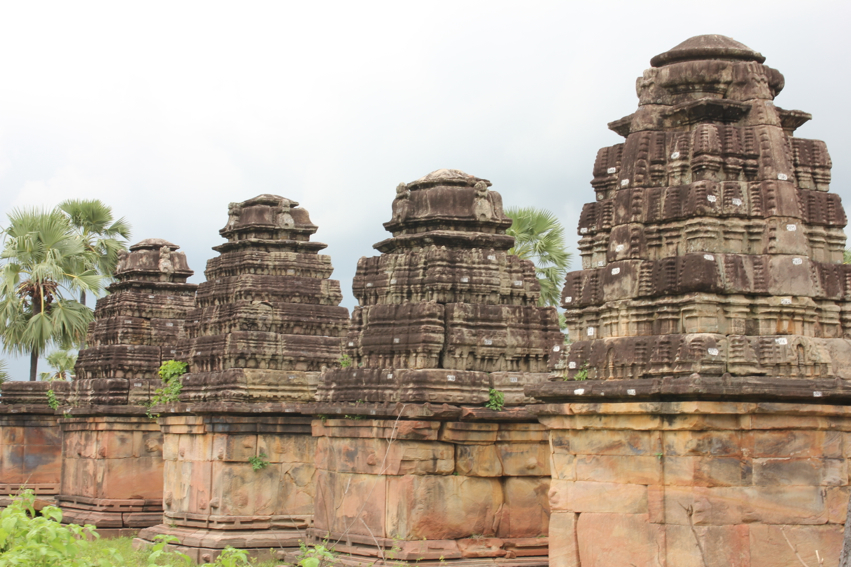
- Ghanpur Temples

- Location in Telangana, India Ghanpur (India)
- Coordinates: 18°18′40″N 79°52′20″E
- Country: India
- State: Telangana
- District: Mulugu district
- Talukas: Ghanpur

Population
  - Total: 7,154

Languages
  - Official: Telugu
- Time zone: UTC+5:30 (IST)
- PIN: 506345
- Telephone code: 08715
- Vehicle registration: TS 03
- Website: telangana.gov.in

Ghanpur is a village and a mandal in Mulugu district in the state of Telangana in India.

== Culture ==
Kota Gullu are a group of 12th century stone temples that are located in Ghanpur. They are known for their marvelous architecture and has been among the notable destinations in the district.
