= Manthani =

Manthani Town of Vedas
- Municipality
- Nickname: Mantrapuri
- Location in Telangana, India Manthani (India)
- Coordinates: 18°39′N 79°40′E
- Country: India
- State: Telangana
- District: Peddapalli
- Named for: Mantrakoota Sahasra Linga Sthanam

Government
  - Type: Chairman-Council
  - Body: Manthani Municipality
  - MLA: Sri Duddilla Sridhar Babu

Area
  - Total: 10 km^{2} (3.9 sq mi)
- Elevation: 130 m (430 ft)

Population (2017)
  - Total: 23,000
  - Density: 2,300/km^{2} (6,000/sq mi)
- Demonym(s): Manthanite= Telugu, Hindi, Marathi Languages
- Time zone: UTC+5:30 (IST)
- Postal code: 505184
- Vehicle registration: TS-22
- Website: https://manthanimunicipality.telangana.gov.in/

Manthani is a municipal town in Manthani mandal in Peddapalli district of the Indian state of Telangana. It is located in Manthani mandal on the banks of the river Godavari..Manthani is nearest town of Godavarikhani, Ramagundam & Peddapalli. Manthani gave political birth to very many like swargeeya PV Narsimha Rao elevated to PM Status from MLA CM gradually .Swargeeya Sripada Rao as Speaker & Sridhar Babu now with great record of more than hatrick/s

== Geography ==
Manthani is surrounded by the sacred Godavari River. Manthani assembly constituency is the largest constituency in Telangana in terms of area. The Current MLA of Manthani is Sridhar Babu, from the Indian National Congress.This is his fifth term as the MLA of Manthani.

== Transport ==
BUS - Manthani is connected by road through TSRTC depot named MANTHANI-MNTY. Mostly buses ply to Karimnagar, Hyderabad, Godavarikhani, Bhupalapally, Warangal, Bhadrachalam, Chandrapur, Dharmavaram, Mancherial etc.,

Train - Manthani has no Railway line .It’s Nearest Railway Station is Ramagundam & Peddapalli Junction.

Air - Nearest Airport is RGIA at Hyderabad .

== See also ==
- Manthani (Assembly constituency)
- Sridhar Babu

== History ==
According to an inscription of Sri Jagadguru Shankaracharya at Dwarakapeetam and Pushpagiri Peetam, Adi Shankara had visited Manthani. A ruined Shiva temple, once-prominent dating back to the period of Kakatiya Dynasty, known as Gautameshwara, is found in Manthani. It is known for elaborate carvings and fine sculptures similar to that of main Kakatiya temples such as the Thousand Pillar Temple in Warangal.
