= Bhupalpally =

Bhupalpally BLACK GOLD BELT CITY OF SOUTH INDIA
- Town
- Bhupalpally (Telangana)
- Coordinates: 18.429300°N 79.863500°E
- Country: India
- State: Telangana
- District: Jayashankar Bhupalpally district
- Talukas: Bhupalpally

Area
  - Total: 52.62 km^{2} (20.32 sq mi)
- Elevation: 219 m (719 ft)

Population (2011)
  - Total: 42,387
  - Density: 805.5/km^{2} (2,086/sq mi)

Languages
  - Official: Telugu
- Time zone: UTC+5:30 (IST)
- PIN: 506169
- Telephone code: 08713
- Vehicle registration: TS-25

Bhupalpally is a town and is the headquarters of the Jayashankar Bhupalpally district in the Indian state of Telangana.

== Government and politics ==
Civic administration

The Bhupalpally Nagar Panchayat was constituted in 2012. The jurisdiction of the civic body is spread over an area of 52.62 km^{2} (20.32 mi^{2}).
