= Shayampet =

- Village
- Location in Telangana, India Shayampet (India)
- Coordinates: 18°07′00″N 79°44′15″E
- Country: India
- State: Telangana
- District: Hanamkonda district

Population
  - Total: 20,000+

Languages
  - Official: Telugu
- Time zone: UTC+5:30 (IST)
- PIN: 506319
- Vehicle registration: TS

Shayampet is a village and a mandal in Hanamkonda district in the state of Telangana in India.

- List of Villages in Shyampet Mandal
1. Gatlakaniparthy
2. Hussainpalle
3. Katrapalle
4. Koppula
5. Mylaram
6. Neredpalle
7. Pattipaka
8. Pedda Kodepaka
9. Shayampet
10. Pragathi Singaram
11. Taharapur
12. Vasanthapur
13. Kothagattu singaram
