= Chityala, Jayashankar Bhupalpally district =

Chityala, Jayashankar Bhupalpally district Chityala
- village
- Location in Telangana, India Chityala, Jayashankar Bhupalpally district (India)
- Coordinates: 18.331°N 79.674°E
- Country: India
- State: Telangana
- District: Jayashankar
- Talukas: Chityal

Population (2001)
  - Total: 57,434 (Mandal Population: 4,915) Link

Languages
  - Official: Telugu
- Time zone: UTC+5:30 (IST)
- PIN: 506356
- Telephone code: 91 08713
- Vehicle registration: TS 03
- Website: telangana.gov.in

Chityala is a village and a mandal in Jayashankar Bhupalpally district in the state of Telangana in India.

== Map ==
https://www.google.co.in/maps/place/Chityal,+Telangana/@18.3296269,79.66992,14z/data=!4m2!3m1!1s0x3a333cb5f29d9775:0xdb3300e5d741c473?hl=en

== See also ==
- Dwarakapet
- Pangidipalle
