= Parkal =

Parakala
- town
- Location in Telangana, India Parakala (India)
- Country: India
- State: Telangana
- District: Hanumakonda district

Government
  - Body: Municipality

Area
  - Total: 16.13 km^{2} (6.23 sq mi)

Population (2011)
  - Total: 29,794
  - Density: 1,847/km^{2} (4,784/sq mi)

Languages
  - Official: Telugu
- Time zone: UTC+5:30 (IST)
- PIN: 506164
- Vehicle registration: TS 03

Parkal is a town in Hanumakonda district of the Indian state of Telangana.

== Government and politics ==
Parkal is an Assembly constituency of Telangana Legislative Assembly, India. It is one of 12 constituencies in Warangal district. It is part of Warangal Lok Sabha constituency.

Parkal is a municipality, earlier it was Nagar Panchayat. Parkal Nagar Panchayat was constituted in 2011 and has 20 election wards. The jurisdiction of the civic body is spread over an area of 16.13 km^{2} (6.23 mi^{2}). It is also the place where Parkala Massacre of 1947 took place. Parkal is a hub for medical, business and agricultural activities. Place worth to visit in Parkal is Amaradhaamam, a monument build to commemorate martyr's of 1947 massacre.

== History ==
On September 2, 1947, an incident reminiscent of the Jallianwala Bagh massacre occurred in this village. The liberation activists were agitating for the merger of the Hyderabad State with the Indian Union. On that day, they were traveling from Paidipalli Talla near Parakala town to hoist the Indian national flag. The Razakars sensed this, and the Nizam issued an order to prevent the activists from raising the national flag. Led by Kasim Razvi, the Razakars massacred the liberation activists who had gathered at Parakala Chapalabanda. The attack continued with knives, axes, and barishas, resulting in 13 activists dying on the spot. Six more succumbed to their injuries in the hospital. Additionally, three more were brutally hacked to death in Rangapur village and shot with axes, batons, and guns. More than 200 activists were seriously injured. This incident became known as the Jallianwala Bagh of Warangal district. On September 17, 2003, during Liberation Day, the then Union Minister and Bharatiya Janata Party leader C.H. Vidyasagar Rao built a memorial named Amar Dham in honor of his mother, Chennamma, in Parakala.

== Transport ==
Uppal Railway station is 20 Km away from Parkal, from this station so many passengers travels to their destinations. And It is (PRKL) well connected through road network. Telangana State Road Transport Corporation runs buses from Parkal to various destinations. National Highway 353 passes through parkal.
