= Manakondur Assembly constituency =

Constituency of the Telangana legislative assembly in India

Coordinates: 18.40°N 79.19°E

Manakondur
- Constituency No. 30 for the Telangana Legislative Assembly
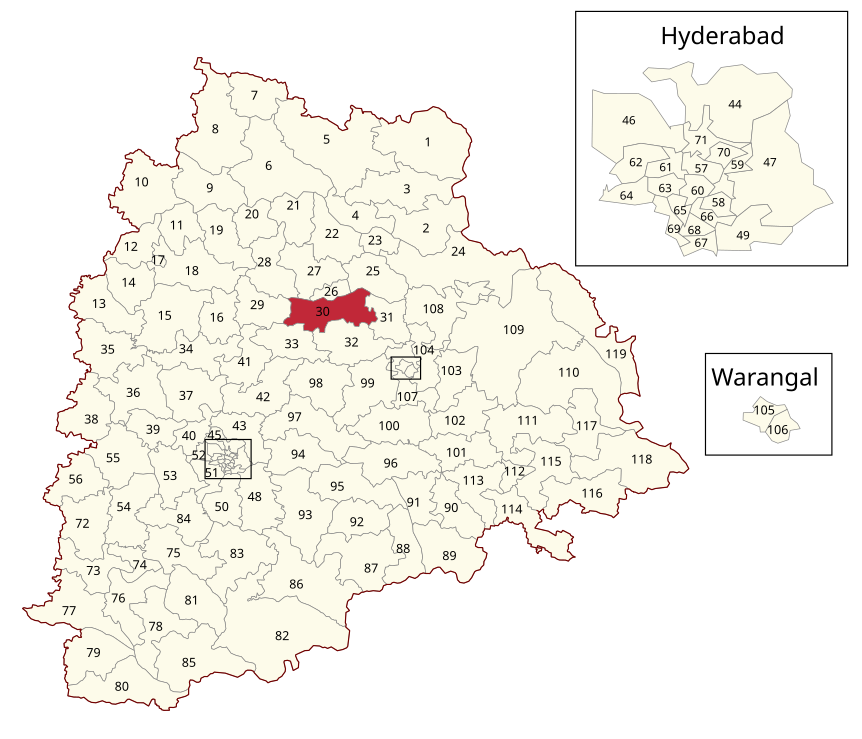
- Location of Manakondur Assembly constituency within Telangana

Constituency details
- Country: India
- Region: South India
- State: Telangana
- District: Karimnagar
- Lok Sabha constituency: Karimnagar
- Established: 2008
- Total electors: 1,91,724
- Reservation: SC

Member of Legislative Assembly
- 3rd Telangana Legislative Assembly
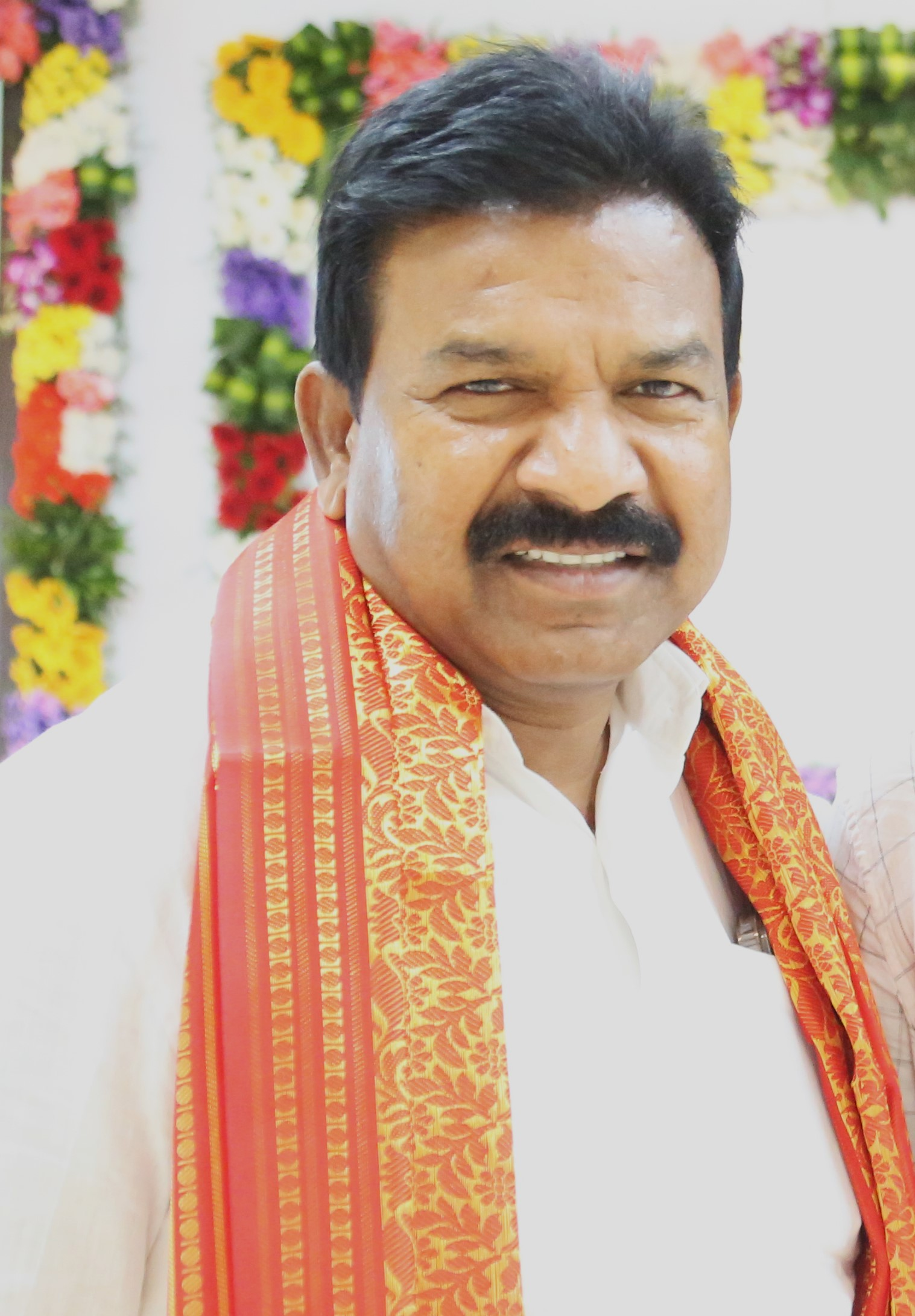
- Incumbent Kavvampally Satyanarayana
- Party: Indian National Congress
- Elected year: 2023

Manakondur Assembly constituency is an SC reserved constituency of Telangana Legislative Assembly, India. It is one among 13 constituencies in Karimnagar district. It is part of Karimnagar Lok Sabha constituency.

Kavvampally Satyanarayana won the seat in the 2023 Assembly election.

Gv Ramakrishna Rao an Advocate by profession and native of Manakondur Constituency Headquarters is a prominent politician from BRS Bharath Rastra Samithi since 2001 and worked as state BRS state youth secretary, Dist youth President, state committee member, SUDA Chairman and now Dist President BRS Karimnagar and is very prominent politician from Manakondur Constituency

== Mandals ==
The Assembly Constituency presently comprises the following Mandals:

Mandal	Districts
Manakondur	Karimnagar
Ellanthakunta	Rajanna Sircilla
Bejjanki	Siddipet
Shankarapatnam	Karimnagar
Timmapur	Karimnagar
Ganneruvaram	Karimnagar

== Members of Legislative Assembly ==
Duration	Member	Political party
2009	Arepally Mohan	Indian National Congress
2014	Rasamayi Balakishan	Bharat Rashtra Samithi
2018	Rasamayi Balakishan	Bharat Rashtra Samithi
2023	Dr. Kavvampally Satyanarayana	Indian National Congress

== Election results ==
2023 Telangana Legislative Assembly election: Manakondur
Party	Candidate	Votes	%	±%
INC	Dr. Kavvampally Satyanarayana	96,773	52.64	
BRS	Erupula Balakishan Rasamayi	64,408	35.04	
BJP	Arepally Mohan	14,879	8.09	
BSP	Nisani Ramachandram	3,345	1.82	
Independent	Shanigarapu Yuvaraju	2,216	1.21	
AIMIM	Boge Padma	844	0.46	
Independent	Nishani Krishna	357	0.19	
Independent	Dubbasi Mahendar	343	0.19	
SP	Thodeti Pavithra	342	0.19	
AIFB	Jakkanapally Ganesh	324	0.18	
None of the Above	None of the Above	1,998	1.09	
Majority		32,365	17.60	{{{change}}}
Turnout		1,83,831	41.5	{{{change}}}

2018 Telangana Legislative Assembly election: Manakondur
Party	Candidate	Votes	%	±%
TRS	Balakishan Rasamayi	88,997	52.24	
INC	Arepally Mohan	57,488	33.75	
Forward Bloc (Socialist)	Prabhakar More	13,610	7.99	
BJP	Gaddam Nagaraju	4,356	2.56	
BSP	Nishani Ramachandram	1,520	0.89	
Dhartipakad Party	Manjula Yanamala	1,045	0.61	
RPI(A)	Karre Ravinder	783	0.46	
Independent	Ande Bhanumurthy	609	0.36	
Bahujan Left Front	Geedi Sadaiah	544	0.32	
SS	Samanapelli Anthaiah	491	0.29	
Jana Mahasangh Party	Maddela Odelu	346	0.20	
AIFB	Jakkanapally Ganesh	298	0.17	
NCP	Dubba Neeraja	259	0.15	
None of the Above	None of the Above	2,561	1.50	
Majority		31,509	18.49	{{{change}}}
Turnout		1,70,346	96.5	{{{change}}}

2014 Telangana Legislative Assembly election: Manakondur
Party	Candidate	Votes	%	±%
TRS	Rasamai Balakishan	85,010	54.58	
INC	Arepalli Mohan	38,088	24.46	
TDP	Dr. Kavvampally Satyanarayana	23,627	15.17	
RPI(A)	Ande Bhanumurthy	2,877	1.85	
BSP	Nisani Ramachandram	1,748	1.12	
Independent	Bamandla Ravinder	990	0.64	
Independent	Thipparapu John Suman	727	0.47	
YSRCP	Ajay Varma Sollu	630	0.40	
Independent	Gaddam Nagaraju	539	0.35	
BC United Front	Kande Sammaiah	424	0.27	
Independent	Siricilla Srinivas	385	0.25	
AIFB	Jakanapally Ganesh	244	0.16	
Independent	Kondra Swaroopa	242	0.16	
Independent	Edla Venkataiah	211	0.14	
None of the Above	None of the Above	1,105	0.71	
Majority		46,922	29.91	{{{change}}}
Turnout		1,56,847	80.3	{{{change}}}

2009 Andhra Pradesh Legislative Assembly election: Manakondur
Party	Candidate	Votes	%	±%
INC	Arepally Mohan	45,304	32.11	
TRS	Voraganti Anand	43,132	30.57	
PRP	Dr. Kavvampalli Satyanarayana	34,430	24.40	
BJP	Gaddam Nagaraju	7,007	4.97	
Independent	Boda Sudhakar	2,509	1.78	
Independent	Gorre Shankaraiah	2,087	1.48	
Independent	Bollampally Ailaiah	1,847	1.31	
BSP	Matangi Ashok	1,829	1.30	
Independent	Bamandla Narendar	900	0.64	
Independent	Janapatla Swamy	876	0.62	
Marxist Communist Party of India	Kanakam Chandraiah	746	0.53	
JD(U)	Kande Sammaiah	427	0.30	
Majority		2,172	1.54	{{{change}}}
Turnout		1,41,204	70.3	{{{change}}}

== See also ==
- List of constituencies of Telangana Legislative Assembly
