= Husnabad Assembly constituency =

Constituency of the Telangana legislative assembly in India

Coordinates: 18.13°N 79.21°E

Husnabad
- Constituency No. 32 for the Telangana Legislative Assembly
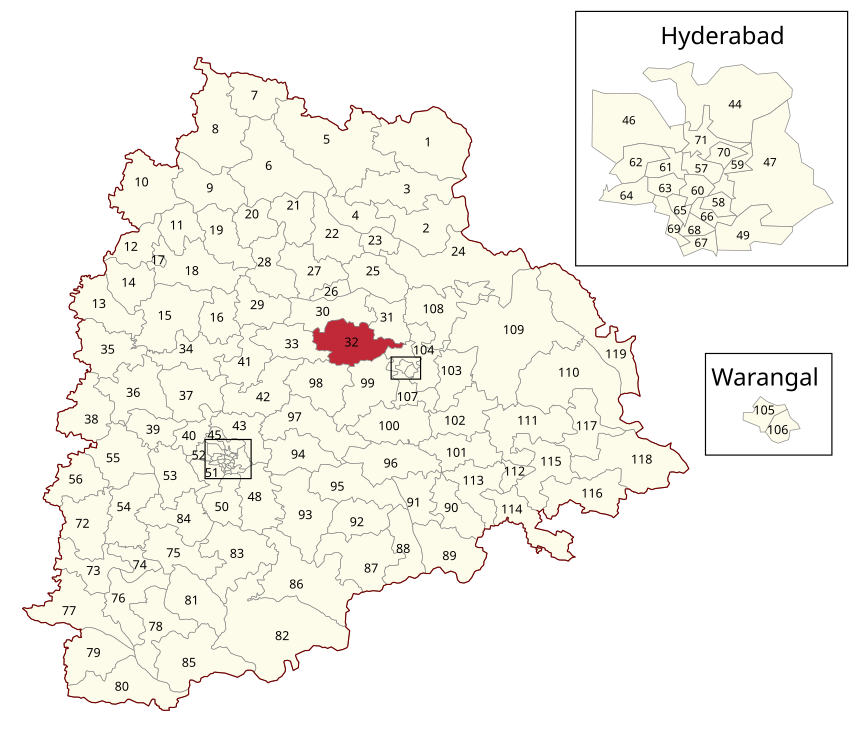
- Location of Husnabad Assembly constituency within Telangana

Constituency details
- Country: India
- Region: South India
- State: Telangana
- District: Siddipet (3 mandals), Karimnagar and Hanamkonda (2 Mandals each)
- Lok Sabha constituency: Karimnagar
- Established: 2008
- Total electors: 2,12,797
- Reservation: None

Member of Legislative Assembly
- 3rd Telangana Legislative Assembly
- Incumbent Ponnam Prabhakar
- Party: Indian National Congress
- Elected year: 2023

Husnabad Assembly constituency is a constituency of Telangana Legislative Assembly, India. It is one of 13 constituencies in Siddipet district. It is part of Karimnagar Lok Sabha constituency.

Vodithela Sathish Kumar of Telangana Rashtra Samithi won the seat for the first time in the 2014 Assembly election.

== Mandals ==
The Assembly Constituency presently comprises the following Mandals:

Mandal
Husnabad
Chigurumamidi
Koheda
Saidapur
Bheemadevarpalle
Elkathurthi
Akkannapet

== Members of the Legislative Assembly ==
Year	Name	Party
United Andhra Pradesh
2009	Aligireddy Praveen Reddy	Indian National Congress
Telangana Legislative Assembly
2014	Vodithela Sathish Kumar	Telangana Rashtra Samithi
2018	Vodithela Sathish Kumar	Telangana Rashtra Samithi
2023	Ponnam Prabhakar	Indian National Congress

== Election results ==
=== Telangana Legislative Assembly election, 2023 ===
Telangana Assembly Elections, 2023: Husnabad
Party	Candidate	Votes	%	±%
INC	Ponnam Prabhakar	100,955	48.84	
BRS	Vodithela Sathish Kumar	81,611	39.48	
BJP	Bomma Sriram Chakravarthy	8,338	4.03	
Independent	Gadda Satish	5,104	2.47	
BSP	Peddolla Srinivas	2,694	1.30	
Independent	Kashaveni Sammaiah	1,305	0.63	
NOTA	None of the Above	1,222	0.59	
Majority		19,344	9.36	
Turnout		2,06,698		
INC gain from BRS		Swing		

=== Telangana Legislative Assembly election, 2018 ===
2018 Telangana Legislative Assembly election: Husnabad
Party	Candidate	Votes	%	±%
TRS	Vodithela Sathish Kumar	117,083	62.67%	
CPI	Chada Venkat Reddy	46,553	24.92%	
TGIP	Devasani Thirupathi Reddy	4,556	2.44%	
BJP	Chada Srinivasa Reddy	4,309	2.31%	
NOTA	None of the Above	3,534	1.89%	
Majority		70,530		
Turnout		1,86,819	83.94%	
TRS hold		Swing		

=== Telangana Legislative Assembly election, 2014 ===
Telangana Assembly Elections, 2014: Husnabad (Assembly constituency)
Party	Candidate	Votes	%	±%
TRS	Vodithela Sathish Kumar	96,517	55.02%	
INC	Aligireddy Praveen Reddy	62,248	35.47%	
Independent	Velpula Sanjeev	4,626	2.64%	
Majority		34,269		
Turnout		1,75,485	82.47%	
TRS gain from INC		Swing		

== See also ==
- List of constituencies of Telangana Legislative Assembly
