= Bodige Shobha =

Indian politician

Member of the Telangana Legislative Assembly
- In office 2014 - 2018
- Preceded by: Suddala Devaiah
- Succeeded by: Sunke Ravi Shankar
- Constituency: Choppadandi

Personal details
- Born: 9 June 1974 (age 52) Karimnagar, Telangana
- Party: Bharatiya Janata Party (2018-)
- Other party: TRS (2001-2018)
- Spouse: Gaalaiah
- Children: Divya, Vikas

Bodige Shobha (born 9 June 1974) is an Indian politician from Telangana state. She won the 2014 Telangana Legislative Assembly election as an Telangana Rashtra Samithi (TRS) party candidate from Choppadandi.

== Political career ==
Bodige Shobha began her political career in 2001 by joining Telangana Rashtra Samithi and she contested the local body election and was elected as ZPTC member from Shankarapatnam mandal. She participated actively in the Madiga Dandora movement for ABC classification & Telangana Movement and later in 2009 she was appointed as TRS party Incharge for Choppadandi Constituency. she contested the 2014 Telangana Legislative Assembly election from the Choppadandi Constituency and won by a huge margin of 54781 votes, defeating Congress candidate Suddala Devaiah.

Bodige Shobha was denied TRS party ticket in 2018 Assembly elections and later she joined in Bharatiya Janata Party on 15 November 2018 in the presence of Telangana party chief Dr K. Laxman. She unsuccessfully contested in 2018, 2023 elections on BJP Ticket.

== Elections contested ==
Election results
Year	Election	Constituency	Party	Opponent	Result	Majority	Ref
2014	Telangana Legislative Assembly election	Choppadandi	TRS	Suddala Devaiah (INC)	Won	54781	
2018	Telangana Legislative Assembly election	Choppadandi	BJP	Sunke Ravi Shankar (TRS)	Lost	42,127	
2023	Telangana Legislative Assembly election	Choppadandi	BJP	Medipally Sathyam (INC)	Lost	63,726	
