= Choppadandi Assembly constituency =

Constituency of the Telangana legislative assembly in India

Coordinates: 18.58°N 79.17°E

Choppadandi
- Constituency No. 27 for the Telangana Legislative Assembly
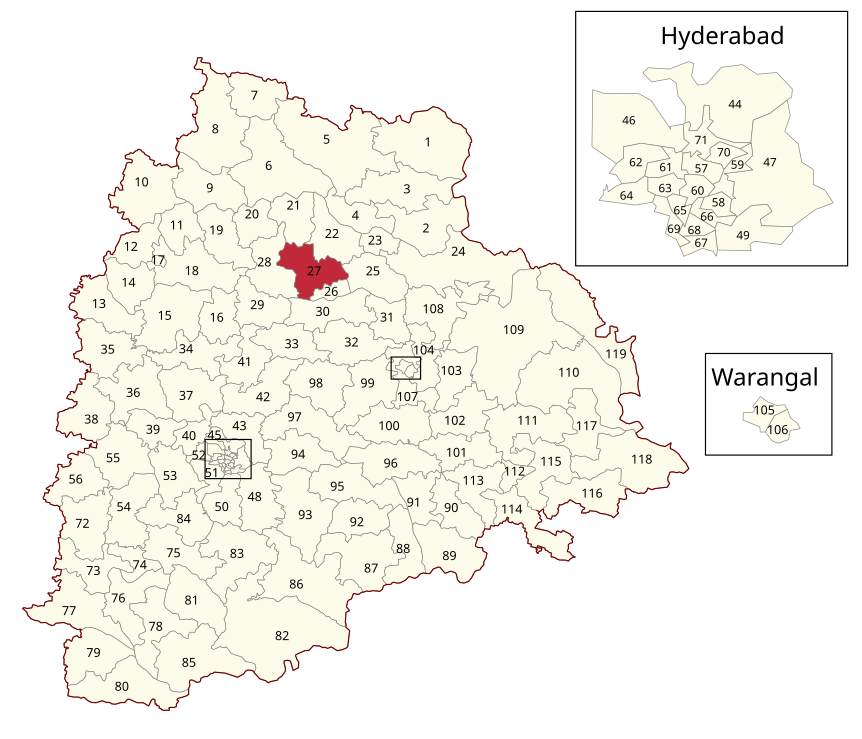
- Location of Choppadandi Assembly constituency within Telangana

Constituency details
- Country: India
- Region: South India
- State: Telangana
- District: Karimnagar
- Lok Sabha constituency: Karimnagar
- Established: 1951
- Total electors: 1,99,703
- Reservation: SC

Member of Legislative Assembly
- 3rd Telangana Legislative Assembly
- Incumbent Medipally Sathyam
- Party: Indian National Congress

Choppadandi Assembly constituency is a SC reserved constituency of Telangana Legislative Assembly, India. It is one of 13 constituencies in Karimnagar district. It is part of Karimnagar Lok Sabha constituency.

Medipally Sathyam of Congress won the seat for the first time with over 60,000 majorities in the 2023 Assembly election.

== Mandals ==
The Assembly Constituency presently comprises the following Mandals:

Mandal	District
Choppadandi	Karimnagar
Boinpalle	Rajanna Sircilla
Gangadhara	Karimnagar
Ramadugu	Karimnagar
Kodimial	Jagtial
Mallial	Jagtial

== Members of the Legislative Assembly ==
Year	Member	Party
Andhra Pradesh
1978	Nyalakonda Sripathi Rao	Indian National Congress
1983	Gurram Madhava Reddy	Telugu Desam Party
1985	Nyalakonda Ramkishan Rao	Telugu Desam Party
1899	Nyalakonda Ramkishan Rao	Telugu Desam Party
1994	Nyalakonda Ramkishan Rao	Telugu Desam Party
1999	Koduri Satyanarayana Goud	Indian National Congress
2004	Sana Maruthi	Telugu Desam Party
2009	Suddala Devaiah	Telugu Desam Party
Telangana
2014	Bodige Shobha Galanna	Telangana Rashtra Samithi
2018	Sunke Ravi Shankar	Telangana Rashtra Samithi
2023	Medipally Sathyam	Indian National Congress

=== Assembly Election 2023 ===
2023 Telangana Legislative Assembly election : Choppadandi
Party	Candidate	Votes	%	±%
INC	Medipally Sathyam	90,395	49.62%	▲20.70
BRS	Sunke Ravi Shankar	52,956	29.07%	▼24.72
BJP	Bodiga Shobha	26,669	14.64%	▲5.29
BSP	Konkati Shekhar	5,153	2.83%	New
NOTA	None of the above	1,260	0.69%	▼0.62
Margin of victory		37,439	20.55%	▼4.34
Turnout		182,185	74.32%	▲0.32
Total valid votes		182,185		
INC gain from BRS		Swing	▲20.70	

=== Assembly Election 2018 ===
2018 Telangana Legislative Assembly election : Choppadandi
Party	Candidate	Votes	%	±%
TRS	Sunke Ravi Shankar	91,090	53.79%	▲15.35
INC	Medipally Sathyam	48,963	28.92%	▲7.59
BJP	Bodiga Shobha	15,835	9.35%	New
Independent	Dasari Vidyasagar	2,222	1.31%	New
NOTA	None of the above	2,220	1.31%	New
Margin of victory		42,127	24.89%	▲7.76
Turnout		169,342	74.00%	▲4.65
Total valid votes		169,342		
TRS hold		Swing	▲15.35	

=== Assembly Election 2014 ===
2014 Telangana Legislative Assembly election : Choppadandi
Party	Candidate	Votes	%	±%
TRS	Bodiga Shobha	86,841	58.13%	▲33.40
INC	Suddala Devaiah	31,860	21.33%	▼4.51
TDP	Medipally Sathyam	13,104	8.77%	▼40.84
Marxista Communist Party of India (United)	Bandapalli Rajaiah	7,199	4.82%	New
Margin of victory		54,981	37.13%	▲30.29
Turnout		149,380	69.35%	▼1.31
Total valid votes		149,380		
TRS gain from TDP		Swing	▲33.40	

=== Assembly Election 2009 ===
2009 Andhra Pradesh Legislative Assembly election : Choppadandi
Party	Candidate	Votes	%	±%
TDP	Suddala Devaiah	68,841	49.61%	New
INC	Gunukonda Babu	35,853	25.84%	New
PRP	Lingampally Kishan	17,528	12.63%	New
BJP	Lingampalli Shankaraiah	4,077	2.94%	New
Independent	Manne Ravindranath	2,294	1.65%	New
Margin of victory		32,988	23.77%	New
Total valid votes		138,765		
TDP win		Swing	New	

=== Assembly Election 2004 ===
2004 Andhra Pradesh Legislative Assembly election : Choppadandi
Party	Candidate	Votes	%	±%
TDP	Sana Maruthi	45,211	37.16%	▼9.92
INC	Koduri Satyanarayana Goud	41,096	33.78%	▼14.99
Independent	Nyalakonda Ramkishan Rao	28,125	23.12%	New
Margin of victory		4,115	3.38%	▲1.68
Total valid votes		121,661		
TDP hold		Swing	▼9.92	

=== Assembly Election 1999 ===
1999 Andhra Pradesh Legislative Assembly election : Choppadandi
Party	Candidate	Votes	%	±%
INC	Koduri Satyanarayana Goud	54,754	48.77%	▲14.85
TDP	Nyalakonda Ramkishan Rao	52,842	47.08%	▼12.51
Margin of victory		1,912	1.69%	▼24.00
Total valid votes		112,246		
INC gain from TDP		Swing	▲14.85	

=== Assembly Election 1994 ===
1994 Andhra Pradesh Legislative Assembly election : Choppadandi
Party	Candidate	Votes	%	±%
TDP	Nyalakonda Ramkishan Rao	56,287	59.59%	▲7.02
INC	Koduri Satyanarayana Goud	30,600	32.40%	▼11.52
Margin of victory		25,687	27.19%	▲18.54
Total valid votes		94,456		
TDP hold		Swing	▲7.02	

=== Assembly Election 1989 ===
1989 Andhra Pradesh Legislative Assembly election : Choppadandi
Party	Candidate	Votes	%	±%
TDP	Nyalakonda Ramkishan Rao	47,783	52.57%	▼25.92
INC	Koduri Satyanarayana Goud	39,921	43.92%	▲24.41
Margin of victory		7,862	8.65%	▼50.33
Total valid votes		90,891		
TDP hold		Swing	▼25.92	

=== Assembly Election 1985 ===
1985 Andhra Pradesh Legislative Assembly election : Choppadandi
Party	Candidate	Votes	%	±%
TDP	Nyalakonda Ramkishan Rao	55,141	78.49%	▲16.48
INC	Bandari Ramaswamy	13,704	19.51%	▼10.42
Margin of victory		41,437	58.98%	▲26.90
Total valid votes		70,253		
TDP hold		Swing	▲16.48	

=== Assembly Election 1983 ===
1983 Andhra Pradesh Legislative Assembly election : Choppadandi
Party	Candidate	Votes	%	±%
TDP	Nyalakonda Ramkishan Rao	41,208	62.01%	New
INC	Bandari Ramaswamy	19,890	29.93%	▼11.01
Margin of victory		21,318	32.08%	▲27.02
Total valid votes		66,450		
TDP gain from INC(I)		Swing	New	

=== Assembly Election 1978 ===
1978 Andhra Pradesh Legislative Assembly election : Choppadandi
Party	Candidate	Votes	%	±%
INC(I)	Nyalakonda Sripathi Rao	26,311	40.94%	New
JP	Muduganti Krishna Reddy	23,061	35.88%	New
INC	Bandari Ramaswamy	11,280	17.55%	New
Margin of victory		3,250	5.06%	New
Total valid votes		64,265		
INC(I) win		Swing	New	

== See also ==
- List of constituencies of the Telangana Legislative Assembly
