= Shankarapeta Kesavapatnam =

Shankarapatnam Kesavapatnam shankarapatnam
- village
- Interactive map of Shankarapatnam Kesavapatnam
- Country: India
- State: telangana
- District: Karimnagar
- Talukas: Shankarapatnam or Keshavapatnam

Government
  - Type: congress

Languages
  - Official: Telugu
- Time zone: UTC+5:30 (IST)
- < PIN -->: 505490

Shankarapatnam Keshavapatnam is a village in Shankarapatnam mandal of Karimnagar district in the state of Telangana in India.
