= Chakunta =

Village in Telangana, India

- Chakunta Village
- Location in Telangana, India Chakunta (India)
- Coordinates: 18°32′16.9722″N 79°10′14.8254″E
- Country: India
- State: Telangana
- District: Karimnagar

Languages
  - Official: Telugu
- Time zone: UTC+5:30 (IST)

Chakunta is a village in Telangana state of India. It is located in Choppadandi mandal of Karimnagar District.

== Demographics ==
Chakunta's population is 2466, including 1301 males and 1279 females. The village is locally famous for its Venkateswara Swamy temple. the annual fair associated with the temple attracts tens of thousands during the time of Brahmotsavam . The village has 633 houses, and its total area is 483 hectares. Telugu is the local language.

== Administration ==
Chakunta is a gram panchayat. The village is administrated by a Sarpanch (Head of the Village), who is elected representative of village.

== Transport ==
Chakunta is located 17 km from the district headquarters Karimnagar and 5 km from Choppadandi. Karimnagar is the nearest town, and is connected to Chakunta by road. Chakunta's PIN code is 505415 and it comes under the Choppadandi postal head office.

== Pilgrimage ==
Venkateswar Swamy temple of Chakunta is very famous and it is located north-west part of the village. Every year the temple celebrates jathara a famous festival and more than 10000 devotees visit.
