= Revelly =

Village in Telangana, India

Revelly is a village in Karimnagar district, Choppadandi mandal. It is 35 km from Karimnagar town proper.
