= Khasimpet =

Khasimpet(manasavaram)
- village
- Country: India
- State: Telangana
- District: Karimnagar

Languages
  - Official: Telugu
- Time zone: UTC+5:30 (IST)
- PIN: 505530
- Vehicle registration: ts-
- Coastline: 0 kilometres (0 mi)
- Nearest city: kaimnagar
- Lok Sabha constituency: Karimnagar

Khasimpet is a village in India, located in the Karimnagar district of Telangana, under the Ganneruvaram mandal. Recently, the village council changed the village name to Manasavaram.
