= Sunke Ravi Shankar =

Indian politician

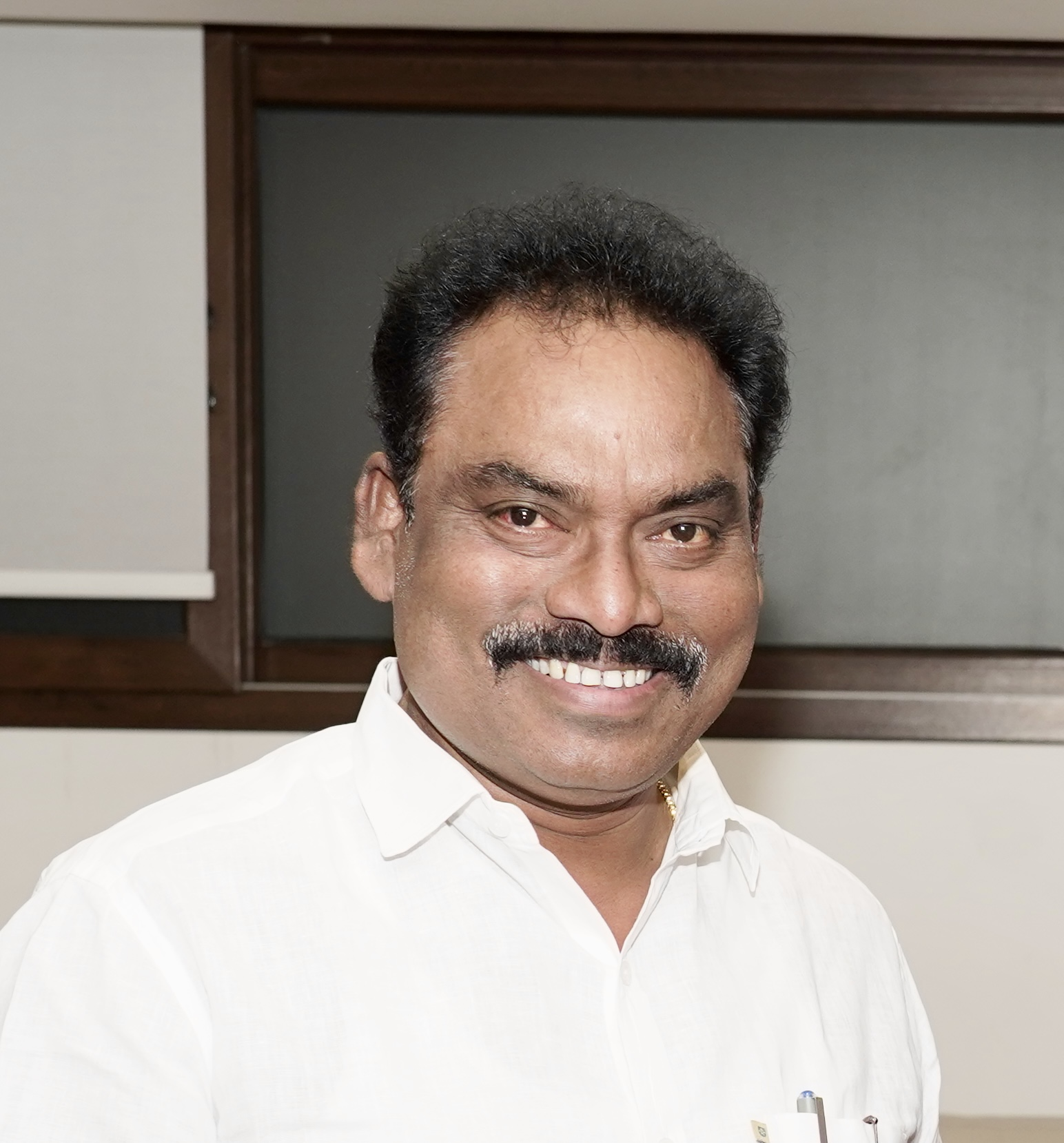

Member of Telangana Legislative Assembly
- In office 11 December 2018 – 3 December 2023
- Preceded by: Bodige Shobha
- Succeeded by: Medipally Sathyam
- Constituency: Choppadandi

Personal details
- Born: 30 June 1970 (age 55) Boorgupalli Village, Gangadhara Mandal, Karimnagar District, Telangana, India
- Party: BRS
- Spouse: Deevana
- Children: 1 Son & 2 Daughters
- Parent(s): Sunke Raghavulu, Rajamma

Sunke Ravi Shankar is an Indian politician from Telangana. He was elected as member of the Telangana Legislative Assembly from Choppadandi Assembly constituency in Karimnagar district in 2018 Telangana Assembly elections.

== Political career ==
Sunke Ravi Shankar began his political career in 2001 by joining Telangana Rashtra Samithi and served as TRS State SC Cell Chairman. He contested the 2018 Telangana Legislative Assembly election from Choppadandi Constituency and won by a huge margin of 42,127 votes, defeating Congress candidate Medipally Sathyam and lost in 2023 Assembly election to his nearest rival Congress candidate Medipally Sathyam by a margin of 37,439 votes.
