= Anabheri Prabhakar Rao =

Telangana communist guerrilla leader (1910–1948)

- Born: 15 August 1910; Polampally, British India
- Died: 14 March 1948 (aged 37); Muhammadapur, Karimnagar District, Telangana, India
- Other name: Telangana Bhagat Singh
- Occupations: Freedom fighter, poet, playwright, composer, artist
- Spouse: Sarala Devi

Anabheri Prabhakar Rao (15 August 1910 – 14 March 1948) was a Telangana communist guerrilla leader and is also considered a foremost authority of the Telugu language. He was an Indian freedom fighter, considered to be one of the most influential revolutionaries of the Indian independence movement. He was an intellectual, military theorist, diplomat and major figure of the Telangana Rebellion. He died fighting against the Nizam and Razakars.

== Early life ==
Anabheri Prabhakar Rao was born to the couple Venkateshwar Rao and Radhabai on 15 August 1910 in a Deshmukh family of Polampally village in Thimmapur Mandal in Karimnagar District in the Hyderabad State (presently Telangana). Born into a Hindu Yellapu family which had earlier been involved in revolutionary activities against the Nizam of Hyderabad, Anabheri studied revolutionary movements as a teenager and was attracted to anarchism and communism. He became involved in numerous revolutionary organizations against the Nizam. Anabheri gained support when demanding equal rights for the Telugu speaking people under the Nizam. His legacy prompted the youth in Telangana to begin fighting for Telangana independence and also increased the rise of socialism in Telangana. While studying in the Nizam College, he was inspired by the ideals of Mahatma Gandhi, Bhagat Singh, Subhas Chandra Bose, Sardar Vallabhbhai Patel and entered the Anti-Nizam Movement as a student.

== Anti-Nizam Movement ==
Anabheri played an important role in organising the 4th Andhra Mahasabha conference. He was elected as the District secretary of office of Andhra Mahasabha at Boiwada in Karimnagar, and Baddam Yella Reddy was elected as the District president. He fought against the Nizam and Razakars. On the call given by Baddam Yella Reddy in September 1947 many people joined the struggle. A Dalam or squad was formed under the leadership of Anabheri Prabhakar Rao. The members of the squads burnt the Records of Patels and Patwaris in about forty villages in January 1948.

He was a regional hero who gave a new wave to the revolutionary movement in Telangana. His only goal in life was to free Telangana from Nizam Empire/Razakars. He was known as Karimnagar/Telangana Bhagat Singh

Anabheri died in battle aged 37. In a fight against the Police and Razakars led by Nizam's close adviser Khasim Razvi, there was a fierce exchange of fire on 14 March 1948 between the police and the communist squad in the hills and hillocks of Muhammadapur near Husnabad in Karimnagar district.

== After death ==
After the death of Anabheri Prabhakar, the Telangana Rebellion reached a high point. Every village created youth forces to fight with Razakars. Not only men, but women also trained using arms.

Later Telangana freedom fighters were recognised as Indian freedom fighters, India Government took police action (Sardar Vallabhai Patel leadership) on Nizam and Razakars. The operation, called "Operation Polo", took place from 13 September 1948 to 17 September 1948. On 17 September 1948 Nizam surrendered to the Indian military. Telangana gained freedom and merged into the Indian Union. Razakar leader Khasim Razvi was sent to jail for killing thousands of innocent people but later he was released and settled in Pakistan.

All the names of these comrades, who died fighting can be noticed on the stupa erected in their memory near the hills of Muhammadapur. There is a statue of Anabheri Prabhakar Rao in Karimnagar in front of Venketeshwara temple. It was erected on 12 January 1994 by then Chief Minister, Mr Kotla Vijaya Bhaskara Reddy. Another statue of Mr. Anabheri Prabhakar Rao, donated by BJP leader Ch. Vidaysagar Rao was unveiled in Husnabad town of Karimnagar district on 22 October 2012 by Telangana armed struggle leader Ch. Kamala Devi in the presence of Karimnagar MP Ponnam Prabhakar, legislator A. Praveen Reddy, former legislators E. Peddi Reddy and Chada Venkat Reddy, freedom fighter Boinpalli Venkat Rama Rao.

== See also ==
- Karimnagar
- Telangana
- Sircilla
- Andhra Mahasabha

== Bibliography ==
- "The National Movement in Telangana". Modern History of Karimnagar. scribd.com.
- Indian Revolutionaries: A Comprehensive Study, 1757–1961, Volume 5
