= Lingannapet =

Coordinates: 18°17′N 78°36′E

Lingannapet is a village in the Karimnagar district of Telangana, India. It has a population of about 5200.
