= Ippalapally =

Village in Karimnagar, Telangana

Ippalapally is a village in Shankarapatnam mandal in Karimnagar district of Telangana State, India. It belongs to Telangana region. It is located 25 km towards South from District headquarters Karimnagar. 5 km from Shankarapatnam.

Ippalapally Pin code is 505474 and postal head office is Tadikal.

Ambalpur (1.5 km), Karimpet (2 km), Keshavapatnam (5 km), Vankayagudem (4 km), Thadikal (3 km), Mogilipalem (4 km) are the nearby Villages to Ippalapally. Ippalapally is surrounded by Chigurumamidi Mandal towards west, Saidapur Mandal towards South, Thimmapur (L.M.D.) Mandal towards west, Manakondur Mandal towards North.

Demographics: Telugu is the main Local Language and Urdu also one of the local languages here.
