= Chelpoor =

- Village / Gram panchayat
- Country: India
- State: Telangana
- District: Karimnagar

Population
  - Total: ~7,000
- Time zone: UTC+5:30 (Indian Standard Time (IST))

Chelpoor is one of the major Gramapanchayat in Karimnagar district in the Indian state of Telangana.

== Demographics ==
Although major religion is Hinduism people here also follow Muslim and Christianity. Under Chelpoor there are two hamlets Rajapalli on the south side and Kuruma palli on the east side. Population of Chelpoor is around 7,000, and numbers of registered voters are around 4810.

== Location ==
Cheploor is well connected to the state capital Hyderabad which is 176 km away by all weather roads and 168 km by train.

== Economy ==
The main income resource for the people of Chelpoor is Agriculture. Cheploor has two large tanks called Pedda Cheruvu and Chinna cheruvu which caters to the irrigation needs in the area. Pedda cheruvu is used for irrigation in 500 Acres and Chinna cheruvu is used for 470 acres.

== Tourism ==
There are two ancient temples - one is Lord Narasimha swamy temple and the other one is Shivalayam, which is located on the East side of the village. Shivalayam was constructed by the great KAKATIYAS (Prataparudra / Rudradeva II, in 13th Century) with phenomenon sculpture .
