= Theegalagutta Palle =

Village in Telangana, India

Theegalagutta Palle or Theegalaguttapally is a village in Karimnagar district of the Indian state of Telangana.
