= Vodithela Sathish Kumar =

Indian politician

Vodithela Sathish Kumar (born 1966) is an Indian politician from Telangana state. He is a former two time Member of the Legislative Assembly in 2014 and 2018, from Husnabad Assembly constituency, in the erstwhile Karimnagar district, presently in Siddipet district. He repreented the Telangana Rashtra Samithi.

== Early life ==
Kumar is from Hazurabad, Siddipet district, Telangana state. He is the son of Laxmikantha Rao. He completed his Master of Technology degreee in 2006 at Kakatiya University, Warangal. He runs his own business. He declared assets worth Rs.2 crore in 2014 and Rs.30 crore in 2023, in his affidavits to the Election Commission of India.

== Career ==
Kumar won from Husnabad Assembly constituency representing the Telangana Rashtra Samithi, in the 2014 Andhra Pradesh Legislative Assembly election, which was concurrently held to elect both the Andhra Pradesh and Telangana legislatures. He polled 96,517 and defeated his nearest rival, Aligireddy Praveen Reddy of the Indian National Congress, by a margin of 34,269 votes. He retained the seat for TRS, winning the 2018 Telangana Legislative Assembly election where he garnered 96,517 votes and beat his closest opponent, Chada Venkat Reddy of the Communist Party of India, by a margin of 49,964 votes.
