= Challoor =

Village in Telangana, India

Challoor is a village located in Karimnagar district, Telangana, India. It is located 30 km from the city of Karimnagar to the southeast, and 75 km from Komuravelli Mallanna temple.
