= Rasamayi Balakishan =

Indian politician

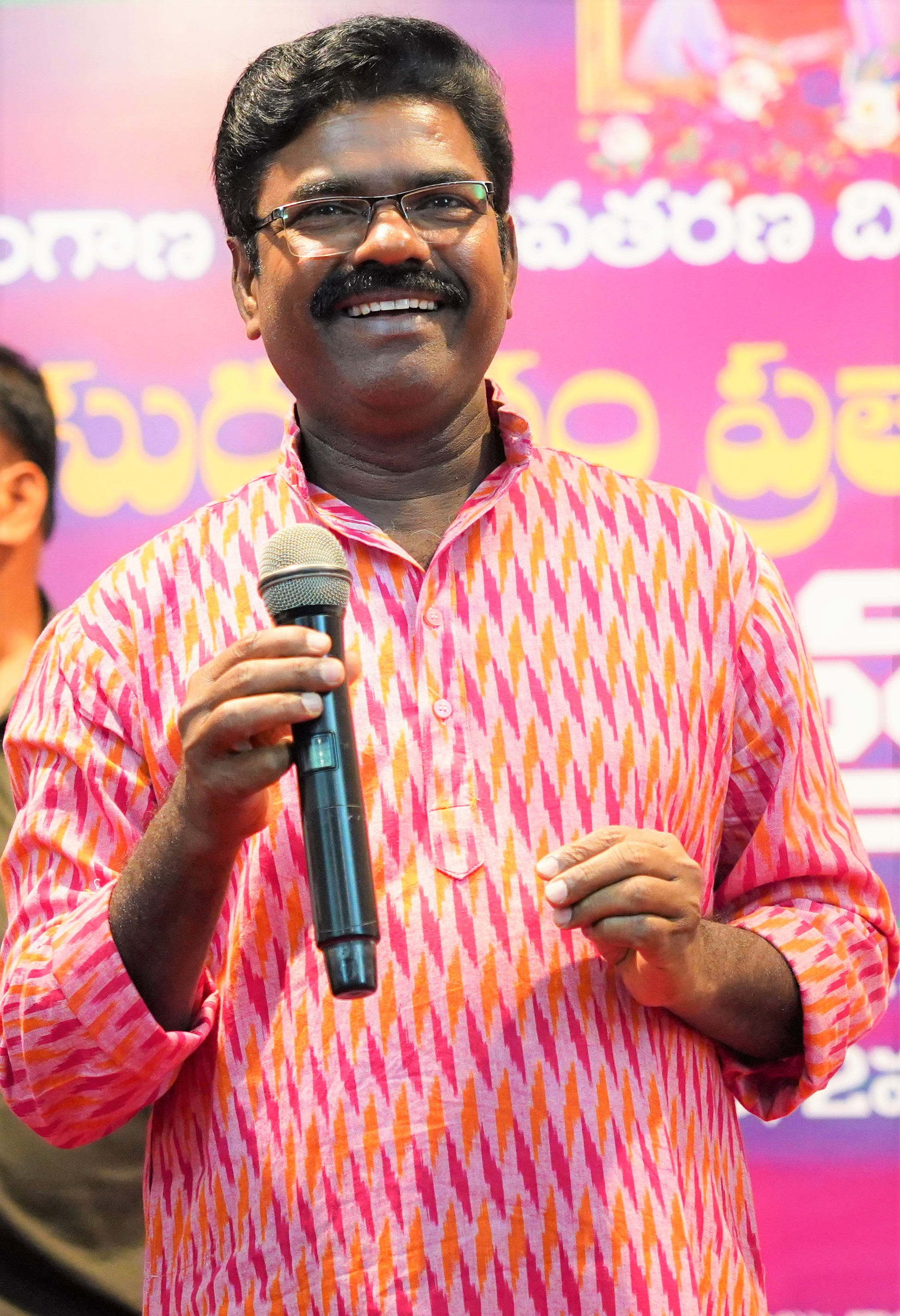

1st Chairman, Telangana Samskruthika Sarathi
- Incumbent
- Assumed office 6 December 2015
- Preceded by: Office Established

Member of the Legislative Assembly
- In office 2014–2023
- Preceded by: Arepally Mohan
- Succeeded by: Kavvampally Satyanarayana
- Constituency: Manakondur

Personal details
- Born: 15 May 1965 (age 61) Raorukula village, Siddipet, Telangana, India
- Party: BRS
- Spouse: Razia Sulthana
- Children: Amith; Adarsh

Rasamayi Balakishan (born 15 May 1965), is a former Member of the Legislative Assembly (Telangana) from the Manakonduru constituency in Karimnagar District in Telangana. He is a singer, poet and political activist. He is also appointed Chairman of State Cultural Council (Telangana Samskruthika Sarathi) with cabinet rank. He is the founder of Telangana Dhoom Dham.

== Early life ==
Born Erpula Balakishan, in Raorukula village in Siddipet Mandal, Telangana to Rajaiah (d. 2010) and Maisamma (d. 2013). Both his parents were illiterate. His family was popular for their folk songs and sappy instrument. He came to be known by the folk song troupe, Rasmayi, became part of his name.

He was appointed the chairman of cultural Department. He heads the cultural troupe for the formation of separate Telangana state. He is the convener of the Telangana Dhoom Dhaam Committee, one of the mini-cultural outfits of the statehood movement.

== Career ==
In 1995, Rasamayi Balakishan started his career as a teacher and balladeer. He was part of the cultural troupe of TRS party.

He often engages the audience and entertains with his local folk songs and dance. He was widely performing at the Telangana movement events in 2009–10.

=== Political career ===
He entered politics by joining TRS party. He was elected as a MLA from TRS party from Manakondur constituency in Karimnagar in 2014 General Elections. He is highly respected for his oratorial skills in the state assembly, and actively participates in debates with the opposition.

== Personal life ==
He is married to Razia Sultana. They have two sons, Adarsh and Amith.

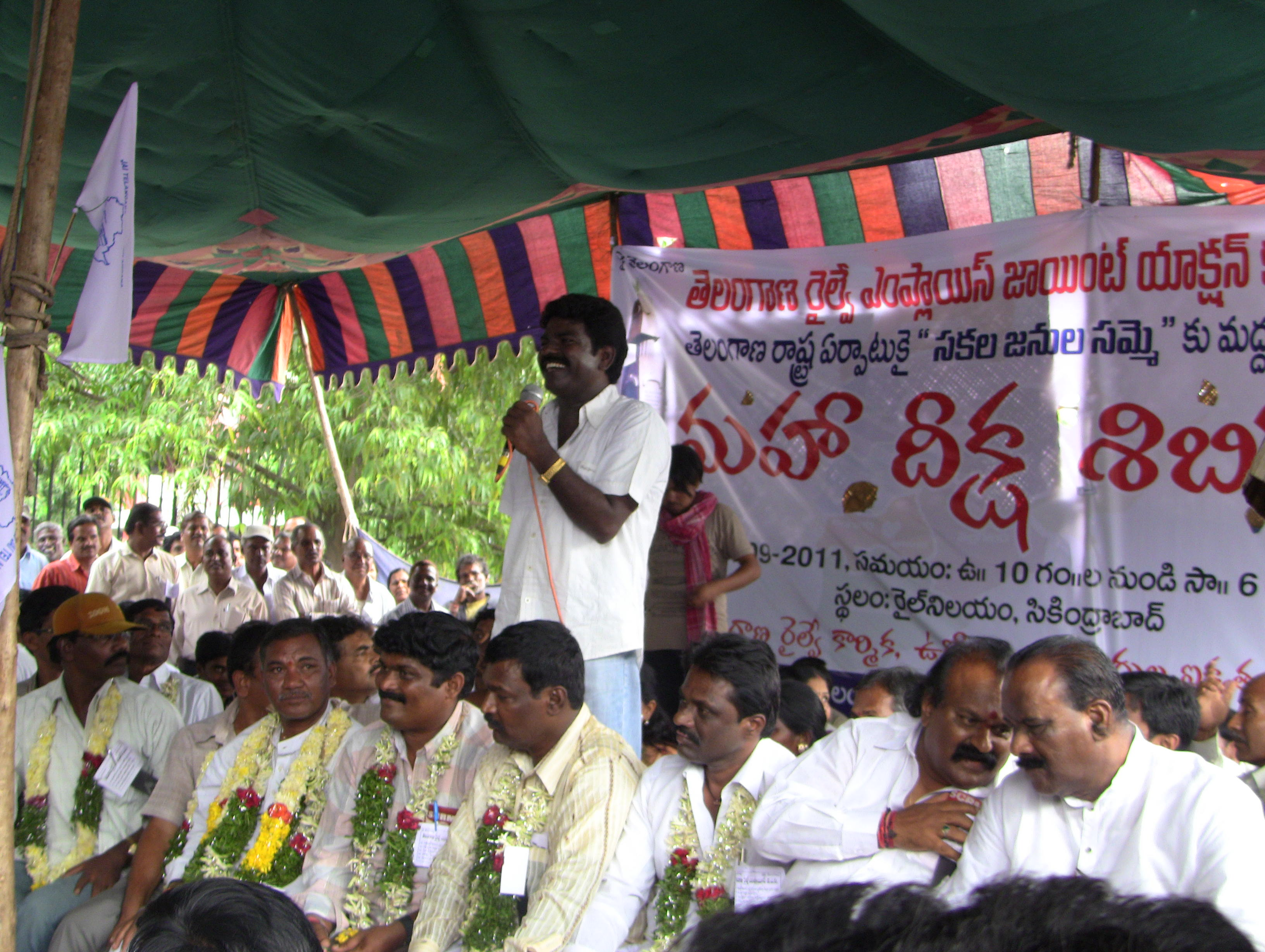
Rasamai Balakishan addressing a public gathering during Telangana Agitation
