= Jagirpally =

- Village
- Location in Telangana, India Jagirpally (India)
- Coordinates: 18°13′13″N 79°18′58″E
- Country: India
- State: Telangana
- Established: Sometime early 1900s.
- Named for: Land Given to a person

Government
  - Type: Democratic

Population
  - Total: 2,000

Languages
  - Official: Telugu
- Time zone: UTC+5:30 (IST)
- Postal code: 505472
- Vehicle registration: TS

Jagirpally is a village in the Karimnagar District of Telangana, India. Coming under Saidapur Mandal, it is situated near the famous temple village Godisaala. During the Kakatiya dynasty, one of the Kakatiya senaani (army chiefs) built the Shiva temple here. This temple came into the light during some archaeological excavations and the people believed that this temple is more famous than the Vemulavaada temple (which now has a famous Shiva temple).

Jagirpally is also near to Vangara, which is the hometown of the former Prime Minister of India, P.V. Narasimha Rao.

== History ==
It is believed that some land was given to a person by the rulers, called the Jaageer. It was part of Saidapur Gram Panchayit's ward. Entire village received one ward but no political importance until the early 1990s. After the number of voters reached almost 1,000, the government elected separate Sarpanch elections to the village.

== Other information ==
Agriculture in this village is 100% based on the rain water, wells and under the lakes. Between 1990 and the early 2000s, there was a severe drought resulting in many people migrating to Hyderabad. Some, however, went to Dubai and worked in very bad conditions. There was no bank until the early 2010s in the village as people were not used to getting loans for crops.
