= Paidichintalapally =

Paidichintalapally is a small village in Dharmaram Mandal, Karimnagar district of Andhra Pradesh, India.
