= Jallaram =

- Census Town
- Location in Telangana, India Jallaram (India)
- Coordinates: 18°41′15″N 79°32′28″E
- Country: India
- State: Telangana
- District: Karimnagar

Area
  - Total: 23.63 km^{2} (9.12 sq mi)

Population (2011)
  - Total: 9,329
  - Density: 394.8/km^{2} (1,023/sq mi)

Languages
  - Official: Telugu
- Time zone: UTC+5:30 (IST)
- Postal code: 505212

Jallaram is a census town in Karimnagar district of the Indian state of Telangana.

== Demographics ==
As of 2001 India census, Jallaram Kamanpur had a population of 11,100. Males constitute 52% of the population and females 48%. Jallaram Kamanpur has an average literacy rate of 60%, higher than the national average of 59.5%: male literacy is 66%, and female literacy is 52%. In Jallaram Kamanpur, 11% of the population is under 6 years of age.
