= Kavvampally Satyanarayana =

Indian politician

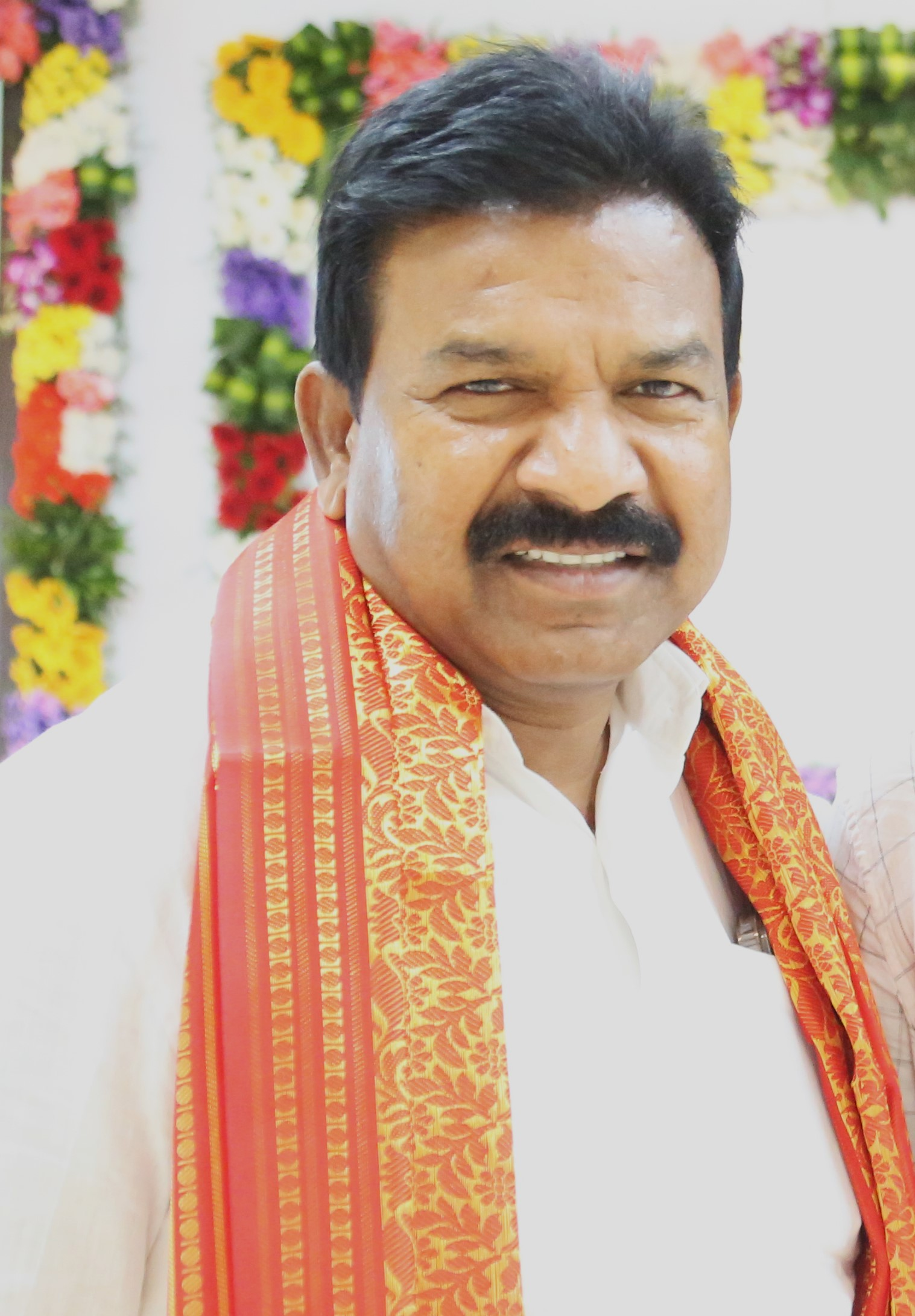

Member of the Telangana Legislative Assembly
- Incumbent
- Assumed office December 2023

Personal details
- Party: Indian National Congress

Kavvampally Satyanarayana (born 1965) is an Indian politician from Telangana state. He is an MLA from Manakondur Assembly constituency which is reserved for SC community in Karimnagar district. He represents Indian National Congress Party and won the 2023 Telangana Legislative Assembly election.

== Early life and education ==
Satyanarayana is from Manakondur, Karimnagar district. He was born to late Kavvampally Ellaiah. He is a doctor. He completed his M.B.B.S. and later did his M.S. in 1998 at Kakatiya Medical College, affiliated with NTR University of Health Sciences.

== Career ==
Satyanarayana won the 2023 Telangana Legislative Assembly election from Manakondur Assembly constituency representing Indian National Congress. He polled 96,773 votes, and defeated his nearest rival Erupula Balakishan of Bharat Rashtra Samithi by a margin of 32,365 votes.
