= Namilakonda =

- village
- Country: India
- State: Telangana
- District: Karimnagar

Government
  - Body: Kodimial

Languages
  - Official: Telugu
- Time zone: UTC+5:30 (IST)
- Vehicle registration: TS
- mandal: Kodimial
- District: Karimnagar
- Website: telangana.gov.in

Namilakonda is the name of a village in Karimnagar district in Telangana, India.
