= Aligireddy Praveen Reddy =

Indian politician

Member of the Legislative Assembly
- In office 2009–2014
- Constituency: Husnabad Assembly constituency

Personal details
- Born: 28 June 1958 (age 67) Telangana, India
- Party: Indian National Congress (INC)
- Occupation: Politician

Aligireddy Praveen Reddy (born 28 June 1958) is an Indian politician from Telangana. Born and raised in Mulkanoor, Karimnagar district, Telangana, to A.K. Vishwanatha Reddy and Vinodha. He is married to Rajyalakshmi, and they have two children, Vinesh Reddy and Powlomi Reddy.

He pursued a Bachelor of Agricultural Science at Marathwada Agricultural University, Parbhani, Maharashtra, and later pursued a PGDM to advance his knowledge in public administration and cooperative management. Inspired by his father, Late Shri. A. K. Vishwanatha Reddy, who established and grew the Mulkanoor Cooperative Rural Credit and Marketing Society Ltd, he has been serving as the President of the Mulkanoor Cooperative Rural Credit and Marketing Society Ltd. since 1989.

== Political career ==
In 2009, Praveen Reddy joined the Indian National Congress under the leadership of then Chief Minister Y. S. Rajasekhara Reddy and PCC Chief D. Srinivas. In the 2009 Andhra Pradesh Legislative Assembly election, he contested as a candidate of the Indian National Congress from the Husnabad Assembly constituency and won the seat with a majority. In this election, he contested against V. Lakshmikantha Rao, former minister as Bharat Rashtra Samithi candidate, E. Peddi Reddy, former minister as PRP candidate, and Chada Venkat Reddy, floor leader of CPI. He served as the Member of the Legislative Assembly (MLA) for the newly demarcated Husnabad Assembly constituency from 2009 to 2014.
