= Ganneruvaram =

Coordinates: 18°22′53.82″N 79°2′46.12″E

Ganneruvaram is a mandal in Karimnagar District, Telangana.
