= Medipally Sathyam =

Indian politician

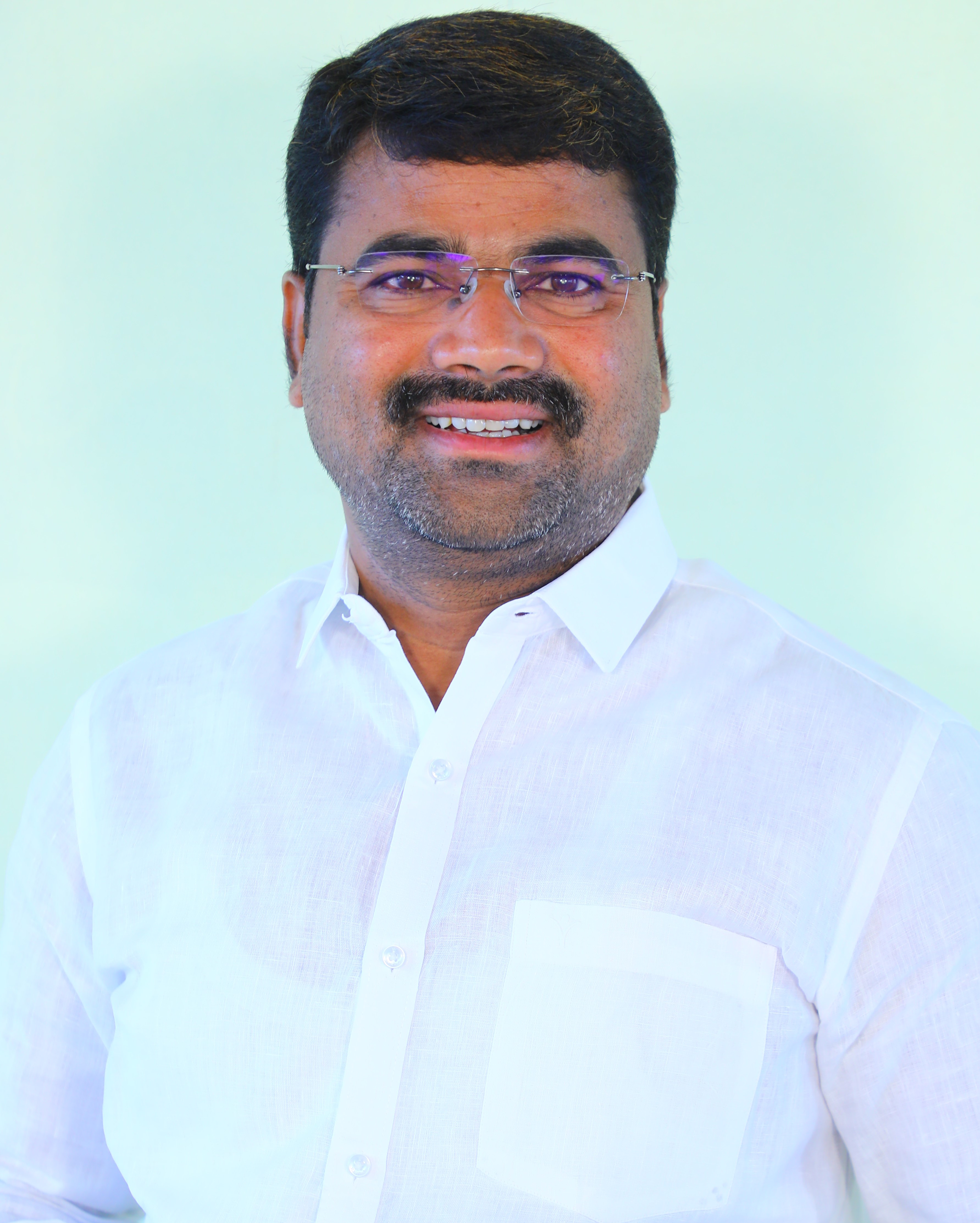

Member of Telangana Legislative Assembly
- Incumbent
- Assumed office 3 December 2023
- Preceded by: Sunke Ravi Shankar
- Constituency: Choppadandi

Personal details
- Born: 5 June 1980 (age 46) Korutlapeta, Yellareddypeta Mandal, Rajanna Sircilla district, Telangana, India
- Party: Indian National Congress
- Spouse: Roopa Devi
- Children: 2

Dr.Medipally Sathyam (born 5 June 1980) is an Indian politician and activist currently serving as a Member of the Telangana Legislative Assembly representing the Choppadandi constituency. A member of the Indian National Congress (INC), he assumed office on 3 December 2023. A former student leader, Sathyam was a prominent participant in the Telangana statehood movement.

== Political career ==
Dr.Medipally sathyam is the student leader from Osmania university, Activist taken part in the Telangana formation

Sathyam began his political journey in student politics while at university. He served as the President of the National Students' Union of India (NSUI) at Osmania University from 2006 to 2007.

- 2014: Contested the Choppadandi seat on a Telugu Desam Party (TDP) ticket but was defeated by the TRS (now BRS) candidate.
- 2018: Contested the same seat representing the INC, but lost to BRS candidate Sunke Ravi Shankar.
- 2023: Won his first term as MLA in the Telangana General Elections. Running on the INC ticket, he defeated the incumbent Sunke Ravi Shankar with a majority of 37,439 votes and assumed office on December 3, 2023.
- 2025: Appointed as the President of the Karimnagar District Congress Committee (DCC) in November 2025.
- Medipally sathyam is the Member of Gulf NRI Policy

== Education ==
Sathyam was born on 5 June 1980 in Korutlapeta village, Yellareddypeta mandal, in the Rajanna Sircilla district of Telangana. He later relocated to Choppadandi. Sathyam pursued higher education at Osmania University, where he completed his post-graduate studies and earned a Ph.D. in Political Science. During his time at the university, he became highly active in student politics.

== Activisim ==
During his time as a student leader at Osmania University, Sathyam became an active participant in the Telangana formation movement. He notably undertook a hunger strike advocating for the creation of a separate Telangana state.

== Personal life ==
Sathyam married his OU Classmate Roopa Devi in 2012. He is survived by son Yojith, and daughter Rishika Sri.

== Elections contested ==
Year	Election	Constituency	Party	Opponent	Majority	Result	Ref.
2014	Telangana Legislative Assembly election	Choppadandi	TDP	Bodige Shobha Galanna (TRS)		Lost	
2018	Telangana Legislative Assembly election	Choppadandi	INC	Sunke Ravi Shankar (TRS)	42127	Lost	
2023	Telangana Legislative Assembly election	Choppadandi	INC	Sunke Ravi Shankar (TRS)	37439	Won	
