= Mogdumpur =

- village
- Location within Telangana Location within India
- Coordinates: 18°28′25″N 79°12′52″E
- Country: India
- State: Telangana

Languages
  - Official: Telugu
- Time zone: UTC+5:30 (IST)
- Postal code: 505186

Mogdumpur is a village in Karimnagar district, Telangana, India. It is approximately 10 kilometres east of Karimnagar city.
