= Gattubhoothkur =

- village
- Country: India
- State: Telangana

Languages
  - Official: Telugu
- Time zone: UTC+5:30 (IST)
- Vehicle registration: TS
- Website: telangana.gov.in

Gattubhoothkur is a village in Karimnagar district, in the Indian state of Telangana. The village is the site of historical places like the Guruju rock monuments. The village surroundings are covered with hills and the village is named after them. In the regional language the word 'Gattu' means hill.
