= Chigurumamidi mandal =

Coordinates: 18°09′30″N 79°07′44″E

Chigurumamidi
- Mandal
- Interactive map of Chigurumamidi
- Country: India
- State: Telangana
- District: Karimnagar
- Talukas: Chigurumamidi

Population (2014)
  - Total: 6,000

Languages
  - Official: Telugu
- Time zone: UTC+5:30 (IST)
- PIN: 505467
- Nearest city: Husnabad
- Lok Sabha constituency: Karimnagar
- Vidhan Sabha constituency: Husnabad
- Website: telangana.gov.in

Chigurumamidi is a mandal in Karimnagar district in the state of Telangana in India.
