= Saidapur =

Village in Telangana, India

Venkapally Saidapur .
- Saidapur
- Location in Telangana, India Venkapally Saidapur . (India)
- Coordinates: 17°37′N 78°57′E
- Country: India
- State: Telangana
- District: Karimnagar
- Talukas: Saidapur

Government
  - Type: Panchayati raj (India)
  - Body: Gram panchayat

Languages
  - Official: Telugu
- Time zone: UTC+5:30 (IST)
- Vehicle registration: TS
- Website: telangana.gov.in

Saidapur is a village in Saidapur mandal of Karimnagar district in the state of Telangana in India, near Huzurabad.

== See also ==
- Jagirpally
