= Ganneruvaram mandal =

Ganneruvaram Mandal
- Tehsil
- Location in Telangana, India Ganneruvaram Mandal (India)
- Coordinates: 18.3816°N 79.0461°E
- Country: India
- State: Telangana
- District: Karimnagar
- Time zone: UTC+5:30 (IST)
- Postal code: 505530

Ganneruvaram is a mandal in Karimnagar district of Telangana state, India. It is a new mandal. It comes under Karimnagar Revenue division. Its headquarters are in Ganneruvaram village. It was formed by the Final Notification orders Issued. REVENUE (DA-CMRF) DEPARTMENT GO. Ms. No. 225: Date: 11.10.2016. It consists of 12 villages including Ganneruvaram village.

== Villages in Ganneruvaram Mandal ==
- Parvella
- Mylaram
- Shivapuram
- Gunkulkondapur
- Yaswada
- Sangam
- Madhapur
- Panthulu kondapur
- Gannervaram
- Gopalpur
- Jangapalle
- Cherlapur
- Gundlapally
- Peechupally
