= Ramadugu =

Ramadugu is a village in Ramadugu mandal of Karimnagar district, Telangana State, India.
