= Thimmapur, Karimnagar district =

Thimmapur
- Village
- Location in Telangana, India Thimmapur (India)
- Coordinates: 18°21′35″N 79°05′15″E
- Country: India
- State: Telangana
- District: Karimnagar
- Talukas: Thimmapur, Thimmapur subdistrict

Languages
  - Official: Telugu
- Time zone: UTC+5:30 (IST)
- Postal code: 505 527
- Vehicle registration: TS
- Website: telangana.gov.in

Thimmapur is a village in Thimmapur mandal of Karimnagar district in the state of Telangana in India.
