= Choppadandi =

- Town
- Location in Telangana, India Choppadandi (India)
- Coordinates: 18.5833°N 79.1667°E
- Country: India
- State: Telangana
- District: Karimnagar
- Talukas: Choppadandi
- Elevation: 304 m (997 ft)

Languages
  - Official: Telugu
- Time zone: UTC+5:30 (IST)
- PIN: 505415
- Vehicle registration: TS
- Website: telangana.gov.in

Choppadandi is a town Choppadandi constituency of Karimnagar district in the state of Telangana in India.

== Geography ==
Chopadandi is located at 18.5833°N 79.1667°E. It has an average elevation of 304 meters (1000 feet). It is located 19 km towards North from District headquarters Karimnagar. The Shiva Keshava temple located in the village. Choppadandi consist of 23 villages and 15 village panchayats.

== Transport ==
State Highway 7 passes through this town.
