= Shankarapatnam mandal =

Shankarapatnam is a mandal in Karimnagar district in the Indian state of Telangana.
