= Karimnagar district =

- District of Telangana
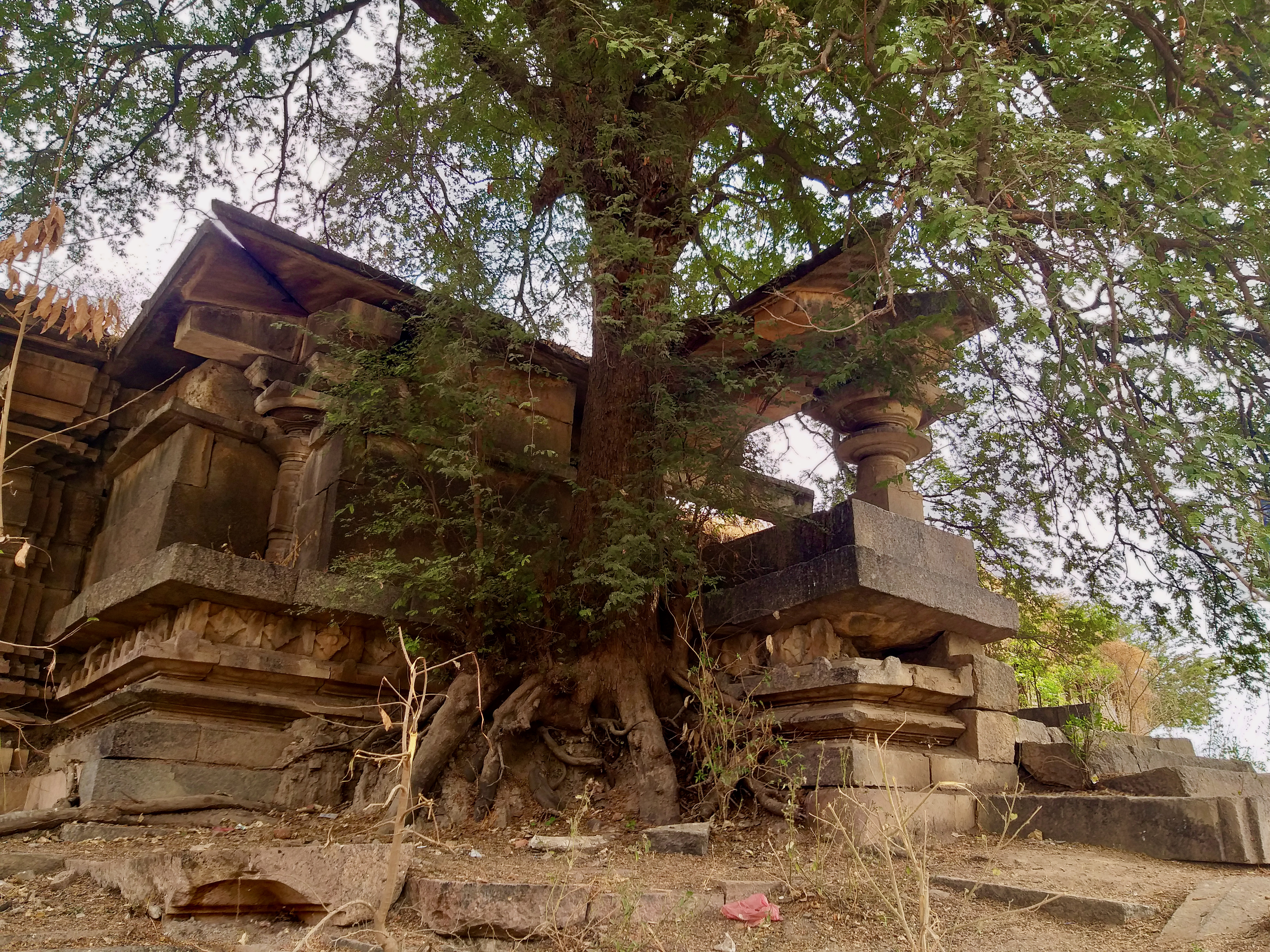
- Chikati Gudi, Kothapalli
- Interactive map of Karimnagar district
- Coordinates (Karimnagar): 18.43694°N 79.124167°E
- Country: India
- State: Telangana
- Headquarters: Karimnagar
- Mandalas: 16

Government
  - District collector: Smt Pamela Satpathy

Area
  - Total: 2,128 km^{2} (822 sq mi)

Population (2011)
  - Total: 1,005,711
  - Density: 472.6/km^{2} (1,224/sq mi)
  - Urban: 30.72%

Demographics
  - Literacy: 69.16%
  - Sex ratio: 993
- Time zone: UTC+05:30 (IST)
- Vehicle registration: TG–02
- Website: karimnagar.telangana.gov.in

Karimnagar district is a district in the Indian state of Telangana. The district shares boundaries with Peddapalli, Jagityal, Sircilla, Siddipet, Jangaon, Hanamkonda district and Jayashankar Bhupalapally districts.

== Etymology ==
Karimnagar was originally called District of karim. Later Kannada kingdoms such as Western Chalukyas ruled it. It was part of the great Satavahana Empire. Later, the ruling Nizams of Hyderabad changed the name to Karimnagar, derived from the name of Shahenshah E Karimnagar Syed Kareemullah Shah Quadrii nithinvasi.

== History ==
After the districts re-organisation in October 2016, 3 new districts were carved out from the erstwhile Karimnagar district to form three new districts of Jagtial district, Peddapalli district and Rajanna Sircilla district. Few mandals were merged into other newly formed districts of Warangal Urban, Siddipet, Jayashankar Bhupalpally.

== Geography ==
The district is spread over an area of 2,128 square kilometres (822 sq mi). Karimnagar is the fifth smallest district in Telangana by area. Karimnagar shares it boundaries with Jagtial to its north, Peddapalli district on north-east, Hanamkonda district towards South, Siddipet district on south-west, Rajanna Sircilla to the West and Jayashankar Bhupalapally on East.

== Demographics ==
Religion in Karimnagar district (2011)
Hinduism	90.08%
Islam	8.48%
Christianity	0.73%
Other or not stated	0.71%

As of 2011 Census of India, the district has a population of 10,05,711. Karimnagar has a sex ratio of 993 females per 1000 males and a literacy rate of 69.16%. 89,079 (8.86%) were under 6 years of age. Total urban population of the district is 3,08,984, (30.72%) of total population. Scheduled Castes and Scheduled Tribes make up 186,648 (18.56%) and 12,779 (1.27%) of the population respectively. It has a single municipal corporation (Karimnagar) and four municipalities under the new municipalities act (Huzurabad, Jammikunta, Choppadandi and Kothapalli). The population of the Satavahana Urban Development Authority has a population of over 4,80,000 in Karimnagar and its urban agglomeration.

Languages of Karimnagar district (2011)
1. Telugu (90.4%)
2. Urdu (7.94%)
3. Others (1.62%)

At the time of the 2011 census, 90.44% of the population in residual Karimnagar district spoke Telugu and 7.94% Urdu as their first language.

== Administrative divisions ==
The district is divided into two revenue divisions of Karimnagar and Huzurabad. These are sub-divided into sixteen mandals. There are 210 revenue villages and 276 Gram-Panchyats in the district. R.V Karnan is the present collector of the district.

=== Mandals ===
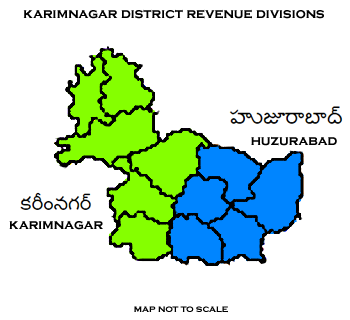
Karimnagar District Revenue divisions

The below table categorizes 16 mandals into their respective revenue divisions in the district:

S.No.	Karimnagar revenue division	Huzurabad revenue division
1	Kothapalli	Veenavanka
2	Karimnagar	V.Saidapur
3	Karimnagar (rural)	Shankarapatnam
4	Manakondur	Huzurabad
5	Timmapur	Jammikunta
6	Ganneruvaram	Ellanthakunta
7	Gangadhara	
8	Ramadugu	
9	Choppadandi	
10	Chigurumamidi	

== Economy ==
Granite industry of the district include, Tan Brown and Maple Red variety of granite. In Karimnagar district, there are over 600 stone quarries spread over several mandals such as Karimnagar, Manakondur, Mallial, Kesavapatnam etc.

In 2006, the Indian government named undivided Karminagar district as one of the country's 250 most impoverished districts (out of 640). It is one of the nine earlier integrated districts in Telangana currently receiving funds from the Backward Regions Grant Fund Programme (BRGF).

== Notable people ==
- P. V. Narasimha Rao, Former Prime Minister of India
- Vidyasagar Rao, Honourable Maharashtra Governor
- Dr. C. Narayana Reddy, writer, Jnanpith Award recipient.
- Justice N. Kumarayya, Retired Chief Justice of Andhra Pradesh & ex-judge, World Bank Administrative Tribunal
- Midde Ramulu (Oggu Katha artist from Hanmajipet village)
- Anabheri Prabhakar Rao, Freedom Fighter and Telangana Rebellion Martyr
- Mallojula Koteswara Rao
- G. Ram Reddy, architect of distance education and the father of open learning in India.
- Paidi Jairaj, film actor, director and producer. He was recipient of Dadasaheb Phalke Award for lifetime achievement in 1980.
- Siva Reddy, popular Telugu language comedian and actor.
- Naveen Deshaboina, Indian film director born in Manakondur
- Nayakuralu Nagamma, minister of the Palnadu kingdom

== See also ==
- List of districts in Telangana
- Gattubhoothkur
- Moqdumpur
