= List of urban local bodies in Telangana =

The article lists all the urban local bodies, covering municipal corporations and municipalities in the Indian state of Telangana. The statistical data is based on the 2011 Census of India, conducted by The Office of the Registrar General and Census Commissioner, under the Ministry of Home Affairs, Government of India. Some of the Nagar Panchayats were upgraded to municipalities in 2011.

== Municipal Corporations ==
The state of Telangana has a total of 12 municipal corporations out of which 2 are Greater Municipal Corporations.

Municipal Corporation	District	Total
Greater Hyderabad Municipal Corporation	Hyderabad, Medchal-Malkajgiri, Ranga Reddy	1
Cyberabad Municipal Corporation	Ranga Reddy, Medchal-Malkajgiri, Sangareddy	1
Malkajgiri Municipal Corporation	Ranga Reddy, Medchal-Malkajgiri	1
Greater Warangal Municipal Corporation	Hanamkonda, Warangal	1
Nizamabad Municipal Corporation	Nizamabad	1
Karimnagar Municipal Corporation	Karimnagar	1
Ramagundam Municipal Corporation	Peddapalli	1
Khammam Municipal Corporation	Khammam	1
Nalgonda Municipal Corporation	Nalgonda	1
Mancherial Municipal Corporation	Mancherial	1
Mahabubnagar Municipal Corporation	Mahabubnagar	1
Kothagudem Municipal Corporation	Bhadradri Kothagudem	1
Total Number of Municipal Corporations		12

- Population 2011 The Registrar General & Census Commissioner, India. Retrieved 27 March 2018

== Cantonment Boards ==
The state of Telangana has one Cantonment Board in Hyderabad Dist

District	Cantonment Boards	Total
Hyderabad	Secunderabad Cantonment Board	1
Total		1

== Municipalities ==
The state of Telangana has a total of 123 municipalities.

District	Municipalities	Total
Adilabad	Adilabad	1
Bhadradri Kothagudem	Aswaraopeta, Manuguru, Yellandu	3
Jagtial	Dharmapuri, Jagtial, Korutla, Metpally, Raikal	5
Jangaon	Jangaon, Station Ghanpur	2
Jayashankar Bhupalpally	Bhupalpally	1
Jogulamba Gadwal	Alampuram, Gadwal, Ieeja, Waddepalle	4
Hanamkonda	Parkal	1
Kamareddy	Banswada, Bichkunda, Kamareddy, Yellareddy	4
Karimnagar	Choppadandi, Huzurabad, Jammikunta	3
Khammam	Kallur, Madhira, Sathupalli, Wyra, Yedulapuram	5
Komaram Bheem Asifabad	Asifabad, Kagaznagar	2
Mahabubabad	Dornakal, Kesamudram, Mahabubabad, Maripeda, Thorrur	5
Mahabubnagar	Bhoothpur, Devarakadra, Jadcherla	3
Mancherial	Bellampalle, Chennur, Kyathanpally, Luxettipet, Mandamarri	5
Medak	Medak, Narsapur, Ramayampet, Toopran	4
Medchal-Malkajgiri	Aliabad, Mudichintalapalle, Yellampet	3
Mulugu	Mulugu	1
Nagarkurnool	Achampet, Kalwakurthy, Kollapur, Nagarkurnool	4
Nalgonda	Chandur, Chityal, Devarakonda, Haliya, Miryalaguda, Nakrekal, Nandikonda	7
Narayanpet	Kosgi, Maddur, Makhtal, Narayanpet	4
Nirmal	Bhainsa, Khanapur, Nirmal	3
Nizamabad	Armoor, Bheemgal, Bodhan	3
Peddapalli	Manthani, Peddapalli, Sultanabad	3
Rajanna Sircilla	Sircilla, Vemulawada	2
Ranga Reddy	Amangal, Chevella, Ibrahimpatnam, Kothur, Moinabad, Shadnagar, Shankarpalli	7
Sangareddy	Andole–Jogipet, Gaddapotharam, Gummadidala, Indresham, Isnapur, Jinnaram, Kohir, Narayankhed, Sadasivpet, Sangareddy, Zaheerabad	11
Siddipet	Cheriyal, Dubbaka, Gajwel, Husnabad, Siddipet	5
Suryapet	Huzurnagar, Kodad, Neredcherla, Suryapet, Thirumalagiri	5
Vikarabad	Kodangal, Parigi, Tandur, Vikarabad	4
Wanaparthy	Amarchinta, Atmakur, Kothakota, Pebbair, Wanaparthy	5
Warangal	Narsampet, Wardhannapet	2
Yadadri Bhuvanagiri	Alair, Bhongir, Bhoodan Pochampally, Choutuppal, Mothkur, Yadagirigutta	6
Total Number of Municipalities		123

- Statistical Year Book
- Statistical Information of ULBs and UDAs
- Contact Details of the ULBs of Telangana State
