= 2026 Telangana local elections =

Elections to Urban Local Bodies in Telangana in 2026

2026 Telangana urban local bodies elections
- 11 February 2026

2,996 (Note: Election was adjourned in the 6th ward division of Makhtal municipality, Narayanpet district. Thus, election was held in the remaining 15 wards of the municipality and 2995 total wards were part of the election (2581 municipality wards and 414 municipal corporation wards).) wards across 123 urban local bodies (414 wards across 7 municipal corporations and 2,582 wards across 116 municipalities)
- Registered: 52,17,413
- Turnout: 38,09,406 (73.01%) (Note: Of the 2,582 wards in 116 municipalities, 12 were declared elected unanimously. Similarly, of the 414 wards in 7 municipal corporations, 2 were declared elected unanimously. Thus 14 wards were declared elected unanimously across the 123 urban local bodies. Polling was adjourned in one municipality ward. Hence, voting was held in the remaining 2981 wards (2,569 wards in municipalities and 412 wards in municipal corporations).)
	Majority party	Minority party	Third party
Party	INC	BRS	BJP
M. Corp. wards	191	63	76
Municipality wards	1346	718	260
Total ULB wards	1537	781	336
	Fourth party	Fifth party	Sixth party
Party	AIMIM	CPI	AIFB
M. Corp. wards	22	23	14
Municipality wards	48	15	18
Total ULB wards	70	38	32
	Seventh party	Eighth party
Party	CPI (M)	Others
M. Corp. wards	1	23
Municipality wards	12	165
Total ULB wards	13	188

Elections to 2,996 wards across 123 urban local bodies, that is, 414 wards across 7 municipal corporations and 2,582 wards across 116 municipalities in the state of Telangana were held on 11 February 2026. Telangana State Election Commission notified the election as the 2nd Ordinary elections to municipalities and municipal corporations.

Elected ward members and corporators were administered the oath of office on 16 February 2026, and a special meeting for the election of chairpersons and vice-chairpersons of municipalities, as well as mayors and deputy mayors of corporations was held.

Elections for 3 municipal corporations (Greater Hyderabad, Greater Warangal, Khammam) and 6 municipalities (Manuguru, Mandamarri, Achampet, Nakrekal, Kothur, Siddipet) were not scheduled in this election phase.

== Schedule ==
The election schedule was announced by the Telangana State Election Commission on 27 January 2026.

Event	Date
Notification and start date for nominations	28 January 2026
Last date for filing nominations	30 January 2026
Date for scrutiny of nominations	31 January 2026
Date of publication of validly nominated candidates	31 January 2026
Date for appeal against rejection of nomination	1 February 2026
Date for disposal of appeal	2 February 2026
Last date for withdrawal of candidature	3 February 2026
Date for publication of final list of contesting candidates	3 February 2026
Date of Poll	11 February 2026
Date of Re-poll, if any	12 February 2026
Date of counting of votes and declaration of results	13 February 2026
Election of Mayor, Deputy Mayor, Municipal Chairperson and Vice-chairperson	16 February 2026

== Election statistics ==
There were a total of 52,17,413 voters out of which 26,67,025 were women, 25,49,750 were men and 638 were transgender voters. 16,301 ballot boxes were used across 8,207 polling stations. There were a total of 136 counting centres.

Following the withdrawal of 6,701 candidates, there were 12,993 members in the final list contesting candidates. 2,225 candidates were in contest for 414 wards across 7 municipal corporations and 10,719 candidates were in contest for 2,582 wards across 116 municipalities. Prior to the elections, candidates were elected without opposition in 14 wards throughout the state.

73.01% of the total registered voters, that is, 38,09,406 people participated in the election. Of these, 19,57,226 were women, 18,51, 829 were men and 351 were others. The final total voter turnout in municipalities is 75.88% (28,04,274), whereas it is 66.05% (10,05,132) in municipal corporations. Among the municipalities, Choutuppal (Yadadri Bhuvanagiri district) recorded the highest voter turnout of 91.91% (23,713), whereas Nandikonda (Nalgonda district) recorded the lowest voter turnout of 59.68% (8,069). Among the municipal corporations, Nalgonda recorded the highest voter turnout of 77.36% (1,10,194), whereas Nizamabad recorded the lowest voter turnout of 59.12% (2,05,753). Election was adjourned in the 6th ward division of Makhtal municipality, Narayanpet district, with the election held in the remaining 15 wards of the municipality. 2995 wards were part of the election: 2581 municipality wards and 414 municipal corporation wards.

== Results ==
Vote share by party
1. Indian National Congress (39.1%)
2. Bharat Rashtra Samithi (28.8%)
3. Bharatiya Janata Party (15.7%)
4. Others (16.5%)
Seat share by party
1. Indian National Congress (51.3%)
2. Bharat Rashtra Samithi (26.1%)
3. Bharatiya Janata Party (11.2%)
4. Others (11.4%)

=== Results by party ===
Party	Popular vote		Seats	
Party	Votes	%	Contested	Won
Indian National Congress	14,76,746	39.08	2948	1537
Bharat Rashtra Samithi	10,74,518	28.75	2876	781
Bharatiya Janata Party	5,82,279	15.67	2634	260
All India Majlis-e-Ittehadul Muslimeen	1,12,817	3.28	282	70
All India Forward Bloc	55,712	1.5	288	32
Communist Party of India	49,450	1.3	168	38
Communist Party of India (Marxist)	22,035	0.5	108	13
Janasena Party	13,478	0.3	332	2
Bahujan Samaj Party	7,628	0.2	213	2
Independents	3,12,346	8.30	2786	183
NOTA				
Total	37,14,797	100.00	12,993	2,995
Vote statistics
Valid votes	37,14,797			
Invalid votes	94,609			
Votes cast/Turnout	38,09,406	73.01		
Abstentions				
Registered voters	52,17,413			

=== Results by ward ===
District	ULB Name	Wards								
District	ULB Name	Wards	INC	BRS	BJP	AIMIM	AIFB	CPI	CPI(M)	Others
Municipal corporations (7)
Bhadradri Kothagudem	Kothagudem	60	22	8	1	0	0	22	1	6
Karimnagar	Karimnagar	66	14	9	30	3	2	0	0	8
Mahabubnagar	Mahabubnagar	60	29	15	8	3	0	0	0	5
Mancherial	Mancherial	60	44	8	5	0	2	0	0	1 (Note: Includes JSP–1)
Nalgonda	Nalgonda	48	27	9	4	2	4	0	0	2
Nizamabad	Nizamabad	60	17	1	28	14	0	0	0	0
Peddapalli	Ramagundam	60	38	13	1	0	6	1	0	1
Municipal Corporation Wards		414	191	63	76	22	14	23	1	23
Municipalities (116)
Adilabad	Adilabad	49	11	6	21	6	0	0	0	5
Bhadradri Kothagudem	Aswaraopeta	22	17	2	1	0	0	0	0	2
Bhadradri Kothagudem	Yellandu	24	19	3	0	0	0	0	0	2
Jagtial	Dharmapuri	15	15	0	0	0	0	0	0	0
Jagtial	Jagtial	50	23	4	6	2	0	0	0	15
Jagtial	Korutla	33	18	8	6	0	0	0	0	1
Jagtial	Metpally	26	6	6	10	0	0	0	0	4
Jagtial	Raikal	12	3	3	5	0	0	0	0	1
Jangaon	Jangaon	30	12	13	0	0	0	0	1	4
Jangaon	Ghanpur	18	13	5	0	0	0	0	0	0
Jayashankar	Bhupalpally	30	16	10	2	0	0	1	0	1
Jogulamba Gadwal	Alampuram	10	5	5	0	0	0	0	0	0
Jogulamba Gadwal	Gadwal	37	16	11	7	1	0	0	0	2
Jogulamba Gadwal	Ieeja	20	7	13	0	0	0	0	0	0
Jogulamba Gadwal	Waddepalle	10	1	1	0	0	8	0	0	0
Hanamkonda	Parkal	22	13	6	3	0	0	0	0	0
Kamareddy	Banswada	19	11	3	3	1	0	0	0	1
Kamareddy	Bichkunda	12	10	2	0	0	0	0	0	0
Kamareddy	Kamareddy	49	19	11	16	0	0	0	0	3
Kamareddy	Yellareddy	12	10	1	0	0	0	0	0	1
Karimnagar	Choppadandi	14	10	1	3	0	0	0	0	0
Karimnagar	Huzurabad	30	16	8	5	0	0	0	0	1
Karimnagar	Jammikunta	30	10	12	4	0	1	0	0	3
Khammam	Kallur	20	12	7	0	0	0	0	0	1
Khammam	Madhira	22	18	1	0	0	0	0	0	3
Khammam	Sathupalli	23	17	6	0	0	0	0	0	0
Khammam	Wyra	20	12	5	0	0	0	1	1	1
Khammam	Yedulapuram	32	24	2	0	0	0	3	2	1
Komaram Bheem	Asifabad	20	7	9	0	0	0	0	0	4
Komaram Bheem	Kagaznagar	30	9	11	5	1	0	0	0	4
Mahabubabad	Dornakal	15	11	4	0	0	0	0	0	0
Mahabubabad	Kesamudram	16	8	8	0	0	0	0	0	0
Mahabubabad	Mahabubabad	36	13	11	1	0	0	3	3	5
Mahabubabad	Maripeda	15	9	5	0	0	0	0	0	1
Mahabubabad	Thorrur	16	7	9	0	0	0	0	0	0
Mahabubnagar	Bhoothpur	10	7	1	2	0	0	0	0	0
Mahabubnagar	Devarakadra	12	6	4	1	0	0	0	0	1
Mancherial	Bellampalle	34	14	14	1	0	0	0	0	5
Mancherial	Chennur	18	11	4	2	0	0	0	0	1
Mancherial	Kyathanpally	22	7	10	0	0	0	4	0	1
Mancherial	Luxettipet	15	11	3	1	0	0	0	0	0
Medak	Medak	32	14	15	2	0	0	0	0	1 (Note: Includes BSP–1)
Medak	Narsapur	15	6	5	4	0	0	0	0	0
Medak	Ramayampet	12	8	3	1	0	0	0	0	0
Medak	Toopran	16	4	9	3	0	0	0	0	0
Medchal-Malkajgiri	Aliabad	20	8	7	3	0	0	0	0	2 (Note: Includes BSP–1 and Independent–1)
Medchal-Malkajgiri	Mudichintalapalle	24	9	14	1	0	0	0	0	0
Medchal-Malkajgiri	Yellampet	24	8	12	4	0	0	0	0	0
Mulugu	Mulugu	20	12	5	1	0	0	0	0	2
Nagarkurnool	Kalwakurthy	22	13	3	5	0	0	0	0	1
Nagarkurnool	Kollapur	19	16	3	0	0	0	0	0	0
Nagarkurnool	Nagarkurnool	24	18	6	0	0	0	0	0	0
Nalgonda	Chandur	10	6	3	0	0	0	1	0	0
Nalgonda	Chityal	12	9	2	0	0	0	0	0	1
Nalgonda	Devarakonda	20	11	6	1	0	0	0	0	2
Nalgonda	Haliya	12	11	1	0	0	0	0	0	0
Nalgonda	Miryalaguda	48	31	14	1	0	1	0	0	1
Nalgonda	Nandikonda	12	11	1	0	0	0	0	0	0
Narayanpet	Kosgi	16	16	0	0	0	0	0	0	0
Narayanpet	Maddur	16	9	6	0	0	0	0	0	1
Narayanpet	Makhtal	16 (Note: Election was adjourned in the 6th ward division. Thus, election was held in the remaining 15 wards)	12	0	3	0	0	0	0	0
Narayanpet	Narayanpet	24	7	2	11	2	1	0	0	1
Nirmal	Bhainsa	26	1	0	6	12	0	0	0	7
Nirmal	Khanapur	12	3	4	4	0	0	0	0	1
Nirmal	Nirmal	42	24	2	13	3	0	0	0	0
Nizamabad	Armoor	36	19	5	8	1	0	0	0	3
Nizamabad	Bheemgal	12	8	4	0	0	0	0	0	0
Nizamabad	Bodhan	38	17	5	3	12	0	0	0	0
Peddapalli	Manthani	13	11	1	0	0	1	0	0	0
Peddapalli	Peddapalli	36	27	1	1	0	5	0	0	2
Peddapalli	Sultanabad	15	12	1	1	0	1	0	0	0
Rajanna Sircilla	Sircilla	39	6	27	5	0	0	0	0	1
Rajanna Sircilla	Vemulawada	28	13	5	8	0	0	0	0	2
Ranga Reddy	Amangal	15	1	8	6	0	0	0	0	0
Ranga Reddy	Chevella	18	11	4	3	0	0	0	0	0
Ranga Reddy	Ibrahimpatnam	24	8	13	2	0	0	0	0	1
Ranga Reddy	Moinabad	26	10	7	4	0	0	0	0	5
Ranga Reddy	Shadnagar	28	15	11	1	0	0	0	0	1
Ranga Reddy	Shankarpalli	15	9	4	0	0	0	0	0	2
Sangareddy	Andole–Jogipet	20	16	3	0	0	0	0	0	1
Sangareddy	Gaddapotharam	18	3	14	0	0	0	0	0	1
Sangareddy	Gummadidala	22	4	15	2	0	0	0	0	1
Sangareddy	Indresham	18	6	9	2	0	0	0	0	1
Sangareddy	Isnapur	26	10	12	0	0	0	0	0	4
Sangareddy	Jinnaram	20	6	8	4	0	0	0	0	2
Sangareddy	Kohir	16	8	5	1	1	0	0	0	1
Sangareddy	Narayankhed	15	11	3	1	0	0	0	0	0
Sangareddy	Sadasivpet	26	16	8	1	0	0	0	0	1
Sangareddy	Sangareddy	38	22	10	2	1	0	0	0	3
Sangareddy	Zaheerabad	37	14	15	3	2	0	0	0	3
Siddipet	Cheriyal	12	5	7	0	0	0	0	0	0
Siddipet	Dubbaka	20	4	11	2	0	1	0	0	2
Siddipet	Gajwel	20	7	11	1	0	0	0	0	1
Siddipet	Husnabad	20	16	4	0	0	0	0	0	0
Suryapet	Huzurnagar	28	19	4	0	0	0	1	1	3
Suryapet	Kodad	35	26	3	0	0	0	0	0	6
Suryapet	Neredcherla	15	9	5	0	0	0	0	0	1
Suryapet	Suryapet	48	31	11	1	0	0	0	0	5
Suryapet	Thirumalagiri	15	5	10	0	0	0	0	0	0
Vikarabad	Kodangal	12	10	1	0	1	0	0	0	0
Vikarabad	Parigi	18	8	8	0	0	0	0	0	2
Vikarabad	Tandur	36	19	12	3	1	0	0	0	1
Vikarabad	Vikarabad	34	17	11	4	1	0	0	0	1
Wanaparthy	Amarchinta	10	3	3	3	0	0	0	1	0
Wanaparthy	Atmakur	10	6	1	3	0	0	0	0	0
Wanaparthy	Kothakota	15	10	3	1	0	0	0	0	1
Wanaparthy	Pebbair	12	7	5	0	0	0	0	0	0
Wanaparthy	Wanaparthy	33	20	8	2	0	0	0	1	2
Warangal	Narsampet	30	21	6	1	0	0	0	1	1
Warangal	Wardhannapet	12	5	6	0	0	0	0	0	1
Yadadri Bhuvanagiri	Alair	12	7	3	2	0	0	0	0	0
Yadadri Bhuvanagiri	Bhongir	35	22	4	4	0	0	0	0	5
Yadadri Bhuvanagiri	Choutuppal	20	13	3	3	0	0	0	1	0
Yadadri Bhuvanagiri	Mothkur	12	8	3	0	0	0	0	0	1
Yadadri Bhuvanagiri	Pochampally	13	6	5	1	0	0	0	0	1
Yadadri Bhuvanagiri	Yadagirigutta	12	8	1	2	0	0	1	0	0
Municipality Wards		2582	1346	718	260	48	18	15	12	165 (Note: Includes BSP–2 and JSP–1)
Total (123) ULB Wards		2996 (Note: Election was adjourned in the 6th ward division of Makhtal municipality. So the election was held in the remaining 15 wards of the municipality. Thus, the total ULB wards where election was held are 2995 wards)	1537	781	336	70	32	38	13	188 (Note: Includes BSP–2 and JSP–2)

== Surveys and polls ==
=== Exit polls ===
The exit polls were announced on 11 February 2026 after the voting ended.

Polling agency					Lead	Ref.
Polling agency	INC	BRS	BJP	Others	Lead	Ref.
Municipal corporations
People's Pulse	5	0	2	0	Congress	
Municipalities
People's Pulse	68–76	29–36	3–5	0–1	Congress	

== Sangareddy Municipal Council election ==
2026 Sangareddy Municipal Council election
- 11 February 2026

All 38 seats of the Sangareddy Municipal Council 20 seats needed for a majority
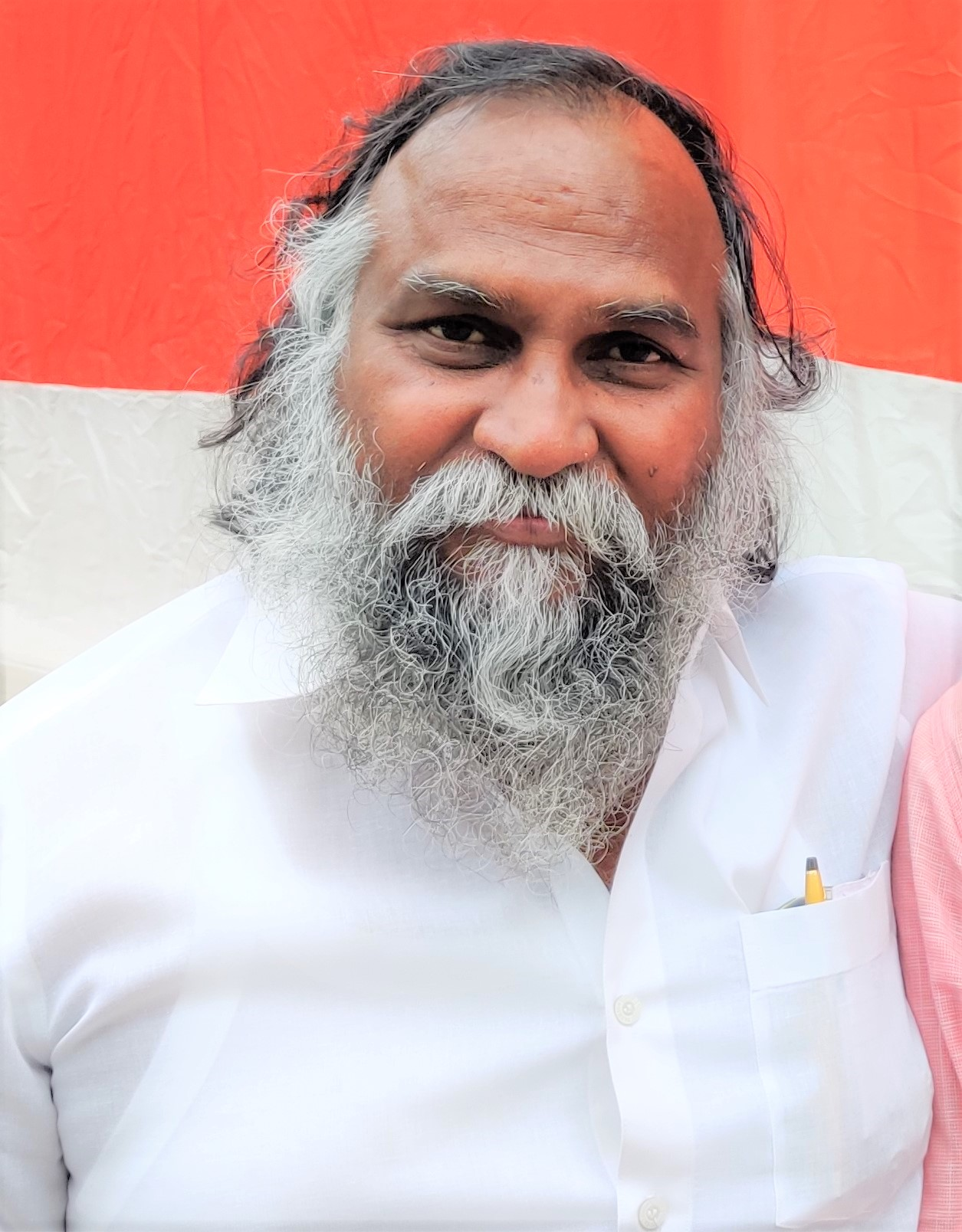

	First party	Second party
Leader	Jagga Reddy	T. Harish Rao
Party	INC	BRS
Last election	12 seats	18 seats
Seats won	22	10
Seat change	▲10	▼8
Popular vote	24,092	17,620
Percentage	41.11%	30.06%
Swing	▲8.30	▼5.44
	Third party	Fourth party
Leader	Narender Reddy	Asaduddin Owaisi
Party	BJP	AIMIM
Last election	3 seats	2 seats
Seats won	2	1
Seat change	▼1	▼1
Popular vote	7,026	3,361
Percentage	11.99%	5.73%
Swing	▲0.87	▼1.16
Mayor before election
B. Vijaya Laxmi
BRS
Mayor after election
Kuna Vanitha
INC

The 2026 Sangareddy Municipal Council election was held to elect all 38 members of the Sangareddy Municipal Council. The election was held on 11 February 2026, and the results were released on 13 February 2026. The elections were a part of the Telangana municipal elections.

=== Background ===
In the previous elections held in 2020, the Bharat Rashtra Samithi won 19 of the 38 seats in the council, followed by the Indian National Congress at 11 seats, and the Bharatiya Janata Party at 3 seats. AIMIM won 2 seats, and independents won 3 seats.

=== Campaign ===
During the run-up to the 2026 municipal elections, the Indian National Congress (INC) campaign in Sangareddy was spearheaded by former Sangareddy MLA Jagga Reddy. The Congress campaign pledged that the state government would sanction a ₹300 crore development package for the city (about ₹8 crore per ward).

The campaign also featured local socio-economic issues, addressing a decade-old grievance involving unfulfilled housing plot allotments for over 5,500 applicants who had received certificates in 2013. Congress leaders promised that the administration would clear final distributions for 80-yard house plots. Meanwhile, opposition parties such as the BRS and BJP raised concerns with the Election Commission regarding campaign disbursements, which local INC leadership dismissed as politically motivated.

=== Results ===
==== Results by party ====
Parties and Coalitions	Seats		Popular vote		
Parties and Coalitions	Won	+/-	Votes	%	
Indian National Congress (INC)	22	▲10	24,092	41.11	▲8.30
Bharat Rashtra Samithi (BRS)	10	▼8	17,620	30.06	▼5.44
Bharatiya Janata Party (BJP)	2	▼1	7,026	11.99	▲0.87
All India Majlis-e-Ittehadul Muslimeen (AIMIM)	1	▼1	3,361	5.73	▼1.16
Independents	3	Steady	6,065	10.35	▼2.13
Others	0	Steady	444	0.76	▼0.44
Source: Telangana State Election Commission
Total	38		58,608		

==== Results by constituency ====
Source: Telangana State Election Commission

Ward		Winner			Runner Up			Margin
#	Name	Candidate	Party	Votes	Candidate	Party	Votes	Margin
1	No. 1	Kummari Krishna	INC	473	Dandu Narsimulu	BRS	371	102
2	No. 2	Naikoti Swathi	BJP	549	Avula Sunitha	INC	540	9
3	No. 3	Jagadeeshwar Kondapuram	BJP	841	Nanchary Kumar	INC	315	526
4	No. 4	Turapathi Shobarani	INC	481	Kasini Srikanth	BRS	448	33
5	No.5	Nimra Farha	AIMIM	602	Bibi Purnoor Jahan	INC	531	71
6	No. 6	Mohammed Kaja Nawajoddin	INC	816	Rasa Vijayalaxmi	BRS	467	349
7	No. 7	Mogulla Vamshi Krishna	INC	807	Mogulla Sharath	BRS	473	334
8	No. 8	Karre Suresh	BRS	729	P Bhoomesh	INC	547	182
9	No. 9	Karkam Srilatha	INC	991	Lade Shirisha	BRS	785	206
10	No. 10	Banuri Shailesh Reddy	INC	882	Pyara Vittal Reddy	BRS	333	549
11	No. 11	Ponna Dasharath Reddy	BRS	1006	Gaddam Tulasi Ram	INC	990	16
12	No. 12	Ponna Rajender Reddy	BRS	1076	Atipamula Ramulu	BJP	350	726
13	No. 13	Begari Veena Kumari	INC	674	Nagamani Begari	BRS	451	223
14	No. 14	Gopanna Venkata Ramanna	Independent	943	Alluri Bhavani Shankar	INC	352	591
15	No. 15	D Sushmitha	INC	516	Farhana Begum	Independent	307	209
16	No. 16	Kothapally Srikanth	BRS	687	Doddi Shanti Kumar	INC	669	18
17	No. 17	Talari Jyothi	INC	445	Mohammed Noushin	BRS	388	57
18	No. 18	Gandla Preethi	Independent	342	Pothuraju Yeshwanthini	INC	288	54
19	No. 19	Gurram Jhansi	INC	714	Chakali Swapna	BRS	566	148
20	No. 20	Anees Sultana	INC	895	Humera Fathima	AIMIM	339	556
21	No. 21	Topaji Veena	INC	450	Raikodu Anitha Bhargavi	BRS	292	158
22	No. 22	Mukurula Srikanth Goud	INC	909	Munnuru Vishnuvardhan	BRS	321	588
23	No. 23	Kuna Vanitha	INC	922	B Ravindranath	BJP	115	807
24	No. 24	Ulfath Sulthana	INC	896	Heena Tabassum	AIMIM	700	196
25	No. 25	Ayesha Sultana	INC	840	Anjum	BRS	600	240
26	No. 26	Shaik Shafi Ahmed	INC	1280	Md Shahed Ali	AIMIM	469	811
27	No. 27	Nakka Manjulatha	BRS	742	Boini Anuradha	BJP	372	370
28	No. 28	Gundelwar Sangeetha	INC	844	Kattakindi Sadhyarani	BJP	314	530
29	No. 29	Begari Srikanth	BRS	685	Kalvakunta Ashwanth	BJP	494	191
30	No. 30	G Manisha	INC	577	Golla Vijaya Laxmi	Independent	468	109
31	No. 31	Jaggari Satish Reddy	INC	869	Shankari Vijender Reddy	BRS	643	226
32	No. 32	Nayekoti Ashwini	BRS	976	Jaggari Ramya Sree	INC	562	414
33	No. 33	Vislavath Ravinder	INC	865	Vittal Goverdhan Naik Rathod	BRS	849	16
34	No. 34	Samreen Begum	Independent	534	Shabana Begum	BRS	330	204
35	No. 35	Kadumanchi Narsamma	INC	850	Shailaja Shankarnolla	BRS	503	347
36	No. 36	Lade Maneela	BRS	773	Madhuri Satheli	INC	523	250
37	No. 37	Balavanthula Jalandhar Rao	BRS	466	George Matthew	INC	396	70
38	No. 38	Mohammed Zafaruddin	BRS	588	Mohammed Yakhoob Ali	AIMIM	534	54

== Karimnagar Municipal Corporation election ==
2026 Karimnagar Municipal Corporation election
- 11 February 2026

All 66 (Note: After the delimitation, the number of wards were increased from 60 to 66) seats in the Karimnagar Municipal Corporation 34 seats needed for a majority
- Registered: 3,48,051
- Turnout: 2,14,486 (62.98%) ▼0.8pp
	Majority party	Minority party	Third party
Party	BJP	INC	BRS
Last election	13 seats	0 seats	33 seats
Seats won	30	14	9
Seat change	▲17	▲14	▼24
	Fourth party	Fifth party	Sixth party
Party	AIMIM	AIFB	Independents
Last election	6 seats	3 seats	5 seats
Seats won	3	2	8
Seat change	▼3	▼1	▲3
Mayor before election
Yadagiri Sunil Rao
BRS
Elected mayor
Kolagani Srinivas
BJP

The 2026 Karimnagar Municipal Corporation election was held on 11 February 2026 to elect the corporators in 66 wards of the Karimnagar Municipal Corporation, the governing body of Karimnagar. After merging the surrounding areas into the corporation limits, the numbers of wards were delimited and increased from 60 to 66.

The Bharatiya Janata Party won 30 out of 66 seats and emerged as the single largest party. The party formed the government after 4 independent and 1 AIFB members joined the party, thus giving it an absolute majority. BJP candidate Kolagani Srinivas was elected as Mayor and Sunil Rao was elected as the Deputy Mayor. The Bharat Rashtra Samiti, which had won the majority in the previous election, suffered significant decline, securing just 9 seats.

Elected ward members and corporators were administered the oath of office on 16 February 2026, and a special meeting for the election of mayor and deputy mayor in which BJP candidate Kolagani Srinivas was elected as Mayor and Sunil Rao was elected as the Deputy Mayor.

=== Schedule ===
The election schedule was announced by the Telangana State Election Commission on 27 January 2026.

Event	Date
Notification and start date for nominations	28 January 2026
Last date for filing nominations	30 January 2026
Date for scrutiny of nominations	31 January 2026
Date of publication of validly nominated candidates	31 January 2026
Date for appeal against rejection of nomination	1 February 2026
Date for disposal of appeal	2 February 2026
Last date for withdrawal of candidature	3 February 2026
Date for publication of final list of contesting candidates	3 February 2026
Date of Poll	11 February 2026
Date of Re-poll, if any	12 February 2026
Date of counting of votes and declaration of results	13 February 2026
Election of Mayor and Vice-Mayor	16 February 2026

=== Results ===
Ward		Winner			Runner-up			Margin
#	Reservation	Candidate	Party	Votes	Candidate	Party	Votes	Margin
1	BC(W)	Bari Aparna	BJP	1482	Aettapu Anjali Prabha	INC	1196	286
2	UR(G)	Kolagani Srinivas	BJP	1703	Dasari Sagar	Independent	1535	168
3	UR(W)	Sadineni Lavanya	BJP	2077	Kashetti Latha	BRS	1084	993
4	SC(G)	Bhupathi Ravinder	BJP	1799	Anjaiah Bejjenki	BRS	1781	18
5	BC(W)	Gade Rupa	BRS	811	Ayesha Fathima	AIMIM	752	59
6	UR(G)	Mekala Venkatesh	BJP	1441	Kapil Madhava Mididhoddi	INC	1170	271
7	UR(W)	Akula Nandinee	Independent	1522	Mamatha Bandi	INC	1040	482
8	UR(G)	Kalva Mallesham	BRS	2898	Gopu Mallesham	INC	1803	1095
9	UR(W)	Padishetti Vasantha Laxmi	INC	1531	Jangili Latha	BRS	1283	248
10	BC(G)	Komuraiah Sowgani	Independent	1105	Koduri Ravinder Goud	INC	839	266
11	UR(W)	Akula Narmada	INC	1065	Panduga Swapna	BJP	948	117
12	UR(W)	Choppari Jaya Sri	BJP	2168	Adla Geetha	BRS	875	1293
13	UR(W)	Thella Laxmi	Independent	796	Lavanya Reddavena	BJP	779	17
14	BC(G)	Gaddi Pradeep	BRS	1041	Gunjeti Shiva Kumar	BJP	932	109
15	UR(W)	Vippala Sai Jyothi	AIFB	1814	Shiva Priya Gurrala	BRS	1592	222
16	UR(G)	Kanthala Jagan Reddy	INC	1734	Kasarapu Srinivas	BRS	1092	642
17	BC(W)	Vemula Kavitha	Independent	1839	Gunti Ramya	BJP	1622	217
18	UR(G)	Vasala Ramesh	BJP	1393	Mohammed Jameeluddin Ahmed	BRS	1188	205
19	UR(W)	Sudhagoni Madhavi	BRS	1160	Jakkula Nagarani	INC	1070	90
20	SC(G)	Parvatham Mallesham	Independent	1755	Asthapuram Maruthi	INC	1186	569
21	UR(G)	Varala Narsingam	INC	1576	Kondapally Sateesh	BJP	980	596
22	UR(G)	Banda Ramana Reddy	BJP	1363	Gundati Srinivas Reddy	INC	895	468
23	UR(G)	Gummadi Raj Kumar	INC	993	Edla Srinivas	Independent	918	75
24	UR(G)	Vontela Satyanarayana Reddy	BJP	1186	Bethi Mahender Reddy	JSP	867	319
25	SC(G)	Ganta Srinivas	INC	1572	Kade Raj Kumar	BRS	972	600
26	UR(G)	Anjan Kumar Vydhula	INC	1917	Pullella Pavan Kumar	BJP	858	1059
27	SC(W)	Botla Shyamala	AIFB	876	Tambala Navya Sri	BJP	652	224
28	ST(G)	Nunsavath Bhaskar	INC	981	Kurra Rajesham	BJP	721	260
29	SC(G)	Somidi Venu Prasad	BJP	1776	Kamsala Srinivas	BRS	667	1109
30	SC(W)	Kallepalli Sharada	INC	1327	Padma Nakka	BRS	860	467
31	BC(G)	S.D. Mukhaddar Hussain	BRS	1919	Mohammad Areef Ahmed	AIMIM	1108	811
32	BC(G)	Shaik Yousuf	BRS	1452	Mohammed Abbas	AIMIM	1308	144
33	BC(W)	Heena Afreen	INC	2120	Zahara Banu	AIMIM	1065	1055
34	BC(G)	Sameena Parveen	Independent	1222	Mohammad Khaja Mazharoddin	AIMIM	629	593
35	BC(W)	Sujatha Sadaveni	BJP	1321	Duggu Harika	INC	1145	176
36	BC(G)	Thota Anil	BJP	1874	Nehikunta Yadaiah	Independent	1150	724
37	BC(G)	K A P P Chandra	BJP	1470	Mohd Sharfoddin	BRS	1201	269
38	UR(W)	Devasani Saraswathi	BJP	1234	Deshaboina Harika	INC	1222	12
39	BC(G)	Ganesh Masam	Independent	1221	Pasupuleti Shivanandam	BJP	805	416
40	UR(W)	Naluvala Pushpalatha	BRS	1165	Kasarla Laxmi Narasavva	BJP	900	265
41	UR(W)	Venaka Renuka	BJP	1017	Thota Suguna	BRS	659	358
42	UR(G)	Yadagiri Sunil Rao	BJP	1590	Panjala Rajanna	INC	376	1214
43	BC(W)	Ponnam Laxmi Goud	BJP	863	Khansa Abdulah	AIMIM	817	46
44	UR(W)	Chadagonda Kavitha	INC	1547	Bandi Thara	BJP	860	687
45	BC(W)	Guggilla Jayasri	BRS	1555	Rajini Peddapalli	INC	662	893
46	BC(G)	Rajender Mallikarjuna	INC	1021	Akhil Goud Koduri	BJP	956	65
47	BC(W)	Gaja Rama	BJP	1508	Challa Swaroopa Rani	INC	1208	300
48	BC(W)	Karra Padma	BJP	1652	Myakala Bhoolaxmi	Independent	1069	583
49	UR(W)	Annam Laxmi Prakash	BJP	1116	Karnakanti Umarani	BRS	811	305
50	UR(G)	Boinipalli Praveen Kumar	BJP	1106	Rachakonda Chakradhar Rao	INC	842	264
51	UR(G)	Bandari Venu	BJP	1813	Ashok Rao Mechineni	BRS	821	992
52	UR(W)	Sarilla Rajakumari	INC	1048	Jyothi Mulukuntla	BRS	353	695
53	SC(W)	Kompelly Swetha	BJP	964	Chandrika Jhansi Rani Inala	INC	843	121
54	BC(W)	Gottimukkula Umarani	BJP	1163	Sai Divya Sri	INC	973	190
55	UR(W)	Guggillapu Manjula	BJP	1093	Kola Malathi	BRS	948	145
56	UR(W)	Thati Prabhavathi	BJP	1273	Guduri Sharadha	INC	673	600
57	UR(W)	Ramya Sri	BJP	820	Latha Sri Kasireddy	CPI	701	119
58	BC(G)	Sardar Ravindar Singh	BRS	1347	Sardar Balbeer Singh	BJP	1111	236
59	BC(G)	Mohammed Majid Hussain	Independent	990	Mohammed Aqueel	BRS	751	239
60	UR(W)	Naseem Sultana	AIMIM	1126	Thula Sridevi	BJP	450	676
61	BC(G)	Mohammed Atheef	AIMIM	1552	Mohammed Sajid Ali	INC	699	853
62	BC(W)	Peddapalli Srilekha	BJP	1322	Nagasamudram Sandhya	INC	365	957
63	BC(G)	Desha Shilpa	BJP	1103	Karre Pavani	INC	957	146
64	BC(W)	Sreeja Padala	INC	718	Roqia Fatima	AIMIM	579	139
65	UR(G)	Mohsin Mohiuddin	AIMIM	1780	Kamtam Thirupathi	BJP	713	1067
66	UR(G)	Vangala Pavan Kumar	BJP	1640	Macherla Narendra Prasad	INC	809	831

=== Surveys and polls ===
==== Exit polls ====
The exit polls were announced on 11 February 2026 after the voting has ended.

Seat share projection
Polling agency						Lead	Ref.
Polling agency	INC	BRS	BJP	AIMIM	Others	Lead	Ref.
People's Pulse	14–16	10–12	24–29	6–9	1–3	BJP	

Vote share projection
Polling agency						Lead	Ref.
Polling agency	INC	BRS	BJP	AIMIM	Others	Lead	Ref.
People's Pulse	21.4%	20.2%	40.4%	5.5%	12.6%	BJP	

== See also ==
- 2026 elections in India
- Elections in Telangana
