= 2020 Sangareddy Municipal Council election =

Local civic election in Telangana, India

- 23 January 2020

All 38 seats of the Sangareddy Municipal Council 20 seats needed for a majority
- Turnout: 72.80%
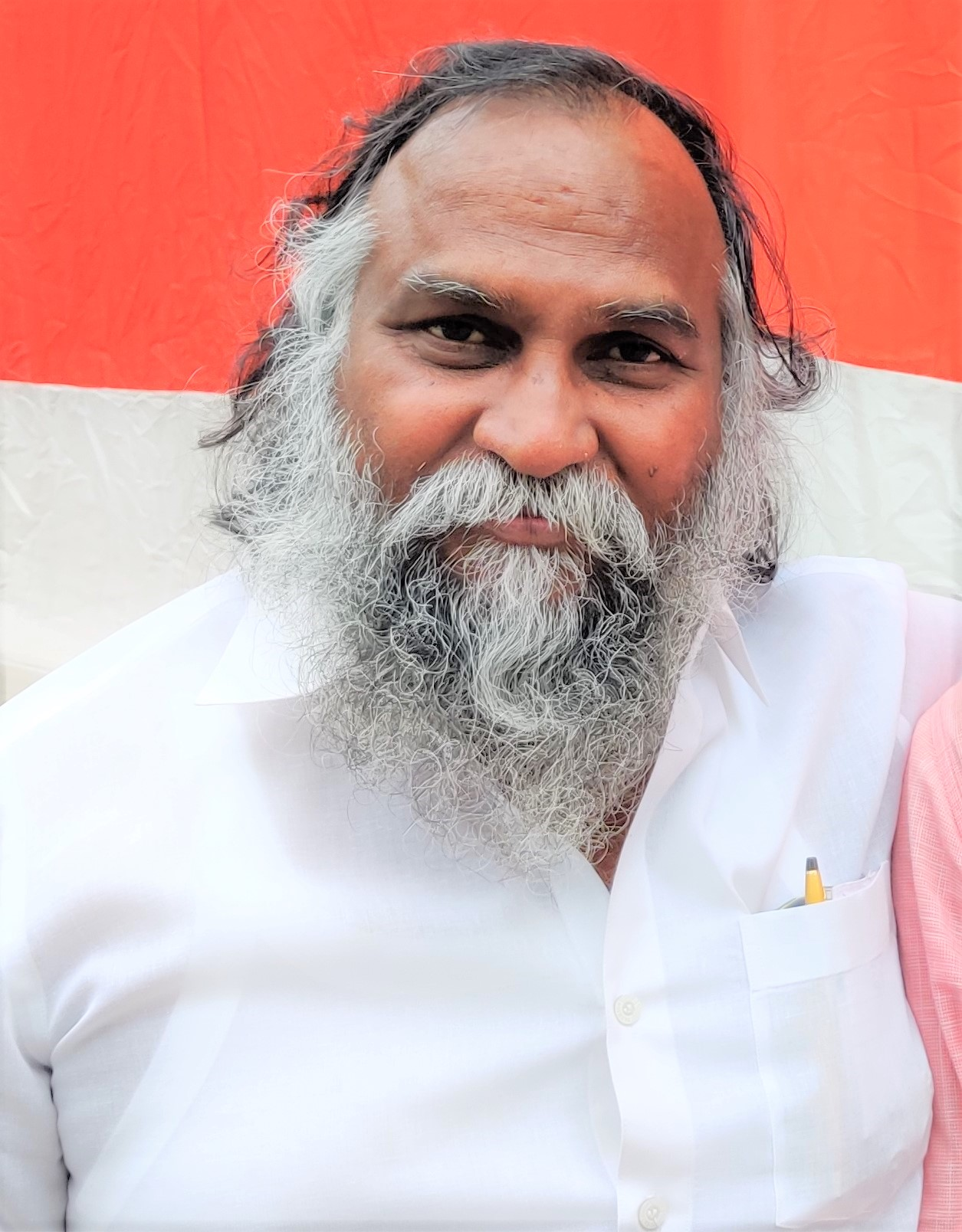

	First party	Second party
Leader	T. Harish Rao	Jagga Reddy
Party	TRS	INC
Last election	2 seats	11 seats
Seats won	18	12
Popular vote	17,997	16,632
Percentage	35.50%	32.81%
	Third party	Fourth party
Leader	Narender Reddy	Asaduddin Owaisi
Party	BJP	AIMIM
Last election	4 seats	TBC
Seats won	3	2
Popular vote	5,636	3,491
Percentage	11.12%	6.89%
Mayor before election
B. Vijaya Laxmi
INC
Mayor after election
M. Vijaya Laxmi
BRS

The 2020 Sangareddy Municipal Council election was held to elect all 38 members of the Sangareddy Municipal Council. The election was held on 23 January 2020, and the results were released on 25 January 2020. The elections were a part of the 2020 Telangana municipal elections.

== Background ==
In the previous elections held in 2014, the Indian National Congress won 11 of the then-31 seats in the council, followed by the Bharatiya Janata Party at 4 seats, and the Telangana Rashtra Samithi at 2 seats. Other parties won 9 seats, and independents won 5 seats.

== Results ==
=== Results by party ===
Parties and Coalitions	Popular vote		Seats
Parties and Coalitions	Votes	%	Won
Telangana Rashtra Samithi (TRS)	17,997	35.50	18
Indian National Congress (INC)	16,632	32.81	12
Bharatiya Janata Party (BJP)	5,636	11.12	3
All India Majlis-e-Ittehadul Muslimeen (AIMIM)	3,491	6.89	2
Independents	6,329	12.48	3
Others	355	0.70	0
None of the above (India)	256	0.50	0
Source: Telangana State Election Commission
Valid votes	50,696	100.00	38
Rejected votes	516		
Total votes	51,212		
Electors	70,405		
Valid vote turnout	72.80		

=== Results by constituency ===
Source: Telangana State Election Commission

Ward		Winner			Runner Up			Margin
#	Name	Candidate	Party	Votes	Candidate	Party	Votes	Margin
1	No. 1	Kasini Rajini	BJP	451	Kasini Gnaneshwari	INC	397	54
2	No. 2	Naikoti Ramesh Kumar	BJP	765	Thota Veerasham	TRS	472	293
3	No. 3	M. Vishnu Vardhan	TRS	359	Jagadeshwar Kondapuram	BJP	355	4
4	No. 4	M. Vijaya Laxmi	TRS	810	Pittala Hymavathi	INC	477	333
5	No. 5	Mumtaz Begum	INC	703	Nimra Farha Mohammad	AIMIM	445	258
6	No. 6	Md. Sohail Ali	TRS	447	Torruri Sripathi Rao	BJP	305	142
7	No. 7	Boini Vijaya Laxmi	INC	777	Padma Balaiah Gari	TRS	527	250
8	No. 8	Begari Srikanth	TRS	729	Ashwanth Kalvakuntla	BJP	387	342
9	No. 9	Lade Maneela	TRS	557	Srilatha	INC	490	67
10	No. 10	Pyata Sravanthi	TRS	666	Challa Srilatha	INC	300	366
11	No. 11	Gaddam Saritha	INC	652	Shankar Annolla Amrutha	TRS	587	65
12	No. 12	Ponna Rajender Reddy	INC	968	Gattumeedi Srinivas	TRS	282	686
13	No. 13	Chennaiah Gari Lavanya	Independent	450	Mailaram Kalpana	TRS	359	91
14	No. 14	Manemma Aluri	Independent	328	Gopannagari Udya Sri	TRS	322	6
15	No. 15	Diddi Vijaya Laxmi	TRS	396	Dhannaram Sushmita	Independent	313	83
16	No. 16	Kothapally Srikanth	TRS	826	Doddi Shanti Kumar	AIMIM	391	435
17	No. 17	Ghousia Begum	INC	286	Ayesha Sultana	Independent	268	18
18	No. 18	S. Ashwin Kumar	TRS	470	Y. Bhikshapathi	INC	411	59
19	No. 19	Chakali Swapna	TRS	510	M. Pallavi	INC	338	172
20	No. 20	Shaik Arif	AIMIM	433	Mohammed Mohtesham	INC	374	59
21	No. 21	Mandula Radhakrishna	BJP	470	Sudhaker Rudraram	INC	377	93
22	No. 22	Turupu Nirmala	INC	843	N. Chandrashekar	BJP	211	632
23	No. 23	Kuna Vanitha	INC	614	Manoranjani	TRS	505	109
24	No. 24	Shaik Shafee	INC	839	Mohammed Nazeemuddin	AIMIM	572	267
25	No. 25	Anjum	TRS	1113	Aliya Begum	INC	226	887
26	No. 26	Shaik Saber	INC	977	Mohammed Shahed Ali	AIMIM	388	589
27	No. 27	Nakka Manjulatha	TRS	488	Puram Santhosh Kumar	BJP	451	37
28	No. 28	Uma Maheshari	TRS	613	Gundelwar Sujatha	INC	608	5
29	No. 29	Kethavath Jairam Pavan	TRS	796	Rudraraj Sujatha	INC	396	400
30	No. 30	Mirdoddi Venkat Raju	INC	384	Ayilreddygari Goutham Reddy	TRS	360	24
31	No. 31	Shankari Latha	TRS	898	Pushpamma Matapathi	INC	241	657
32	No. 32	Naikoti Ramappa	TRS	760	Jaggari Sathish Reddy	INC	573	187
33	No. 33	Nagaraju Navath	INC	522	Chilveri Muralidhar	TRS	487	35
34	No. 34	Mohd. Sami	Independent	449	Mohammad Anwar	TRS	317	132
35	No. 35	Moti Veena	TRS	758	Jagan Mohan Hyderaboini	INC	426	332
36	No. 36	Satheli Madhuri	INC	468	A. Vara Lazmi	TRS	452	16
37	No. 37	Balavanthula Padma	TRS	394	M. Elizabeth	INC	282	112
38	No. 38	Nazima Tabassum	AIMIM	659	Rabiya Begum	INC	536	123
