= Sai Chand (folk singer) =

Indian singer and politician

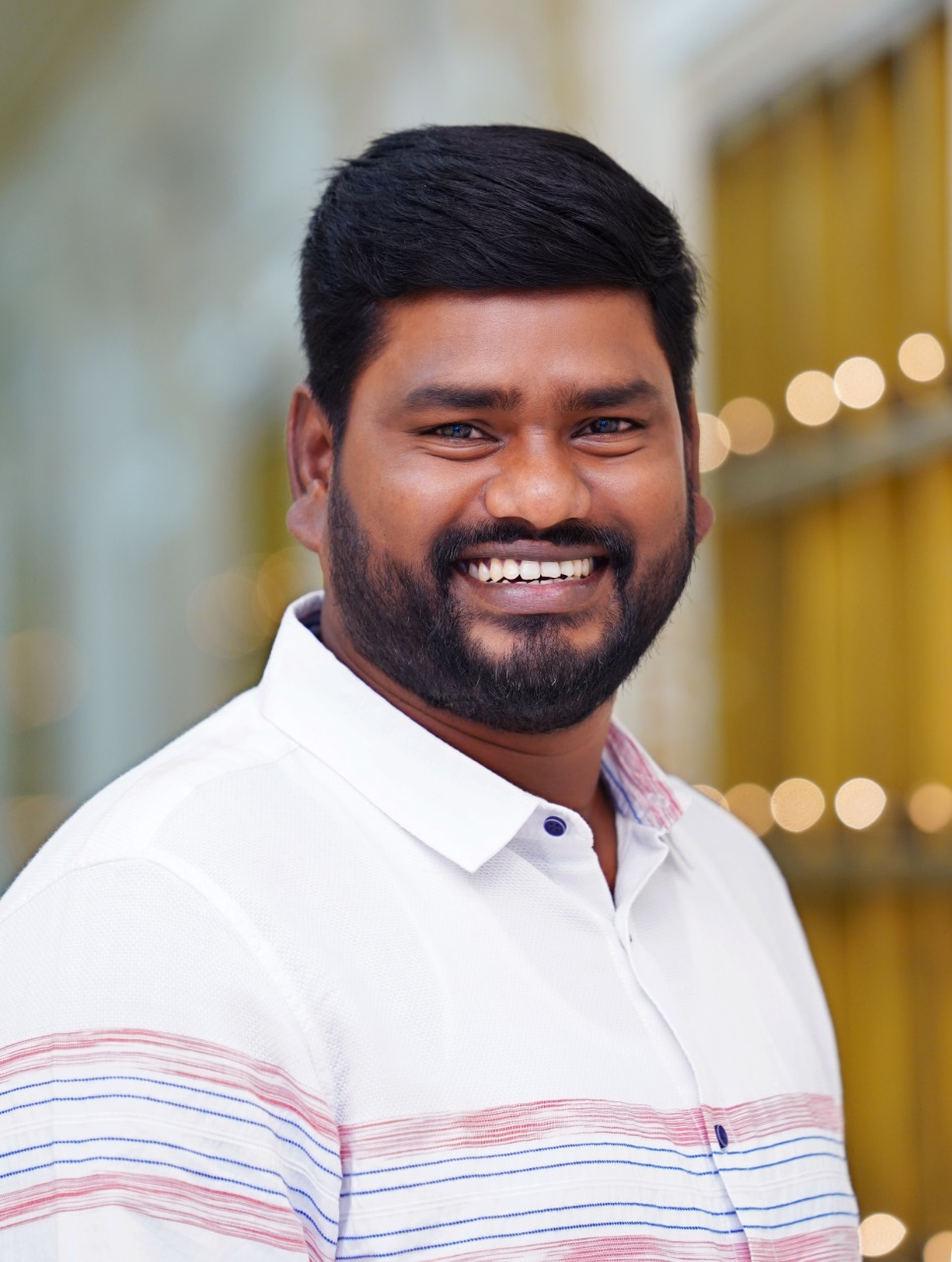

Telangana State Warehousing Corporation Chairman
- In office 24 December 2021 – 29 June 2023
- Preceded by: Mandula Samuel
- Succeeded by: Veeda Rajini

Personal details
- Born: 20 September 1984 Amarchinta, Wanaparthy district, Telangana
- Died: 29 June 2023 (aged 38) Karkonda Village, Bijinapalle Mandal, Nagarkurnool district
- Party: Bharat Rashtra Samithi
- Spouse: Veeda Rajini
- Children: 2

Veeda Sai Chand (20 September 1984 – 29 June 2023) was a folk singer from Telangana state. He was the chairman of the Telangana State Warehousing Corporation and was a member of the Bharath Rashtra Samithi.

== Early life ==
Sai Chand was born in Amarchinta village, Wanaparty district and a resident of Karukonda village of Nagarkurnool district at the time of his death. He pursued his postgraduation, but gained fame as an artist and singer from his student days. Sai Chand played an active role with his stirring folk songs during the struggle for a separate Telangana state.

Through his song and dance performances, he was credited with forging in the Telangana movement spirit among the masses, especially during the second phase of the Telangana agitation for a separate Statehood.

== Death ==
Sai Chand died of heart attack on 29 June 2023. He left behind his wife Veeda Rajini, a son and a daughter.

Saichand along with his family members went to his native place at Karukonda of Nagarkurnool district on 28 June 2023 and around midnight he complained of chest pain and was immediately shifted to a private hospital in Nagarkurnool. As his condition deteriorated, the family members brought him to Care Hospital at Gachibowli where the doctors declared him brought dead.

Many leaders including Chief Minister K. Chandrashekar Rao, BRS ministers K.T. Rama Rao, T. Harish Rao and others paid their homage to Sai Chand at his residence in Gurramguda.
