= Kummariguda =

Kummariguda may refer to any of the following villages in Telangana state, India:

- Kummariguda, Kothur, a village in Kothar mandal, Ranga Reddy district
- Kummariguda, Shabad, a village in Shabad mandal, Ranga Reddy district
