= Batthulapally =

Village in Telangana, India

Batthulapally is a village 5 km from Kallur Mandal, and 55 km from the Khammam District of Telangana, India.
