= Kummariguda, Kothur =

Kummariguda
- village
- Location in Telangana, India Kummariguda (India)
- Coordinates: 17.170971°N 78.284454°E
- Country: India
- State: Telangana
- District: Rangareddy

Population
  - Total: 1,000

Languages
  - Official: Telugu
- Time zone: UTC+5:30 (IST)
- PIN: 509325
- Telephone code: 91-8548

Kummariguda, is a village, in Kothur mandal of Ranga Reddy district in the state of Telangana in India.

It is close to Timmapur and its railway station.

== See also ==
- Shadnagar
- Kothur
- Swadhyay Parivar
- Pandurang Shastri Athavale
