= Sardar Ravinder Singh =

Indian politician

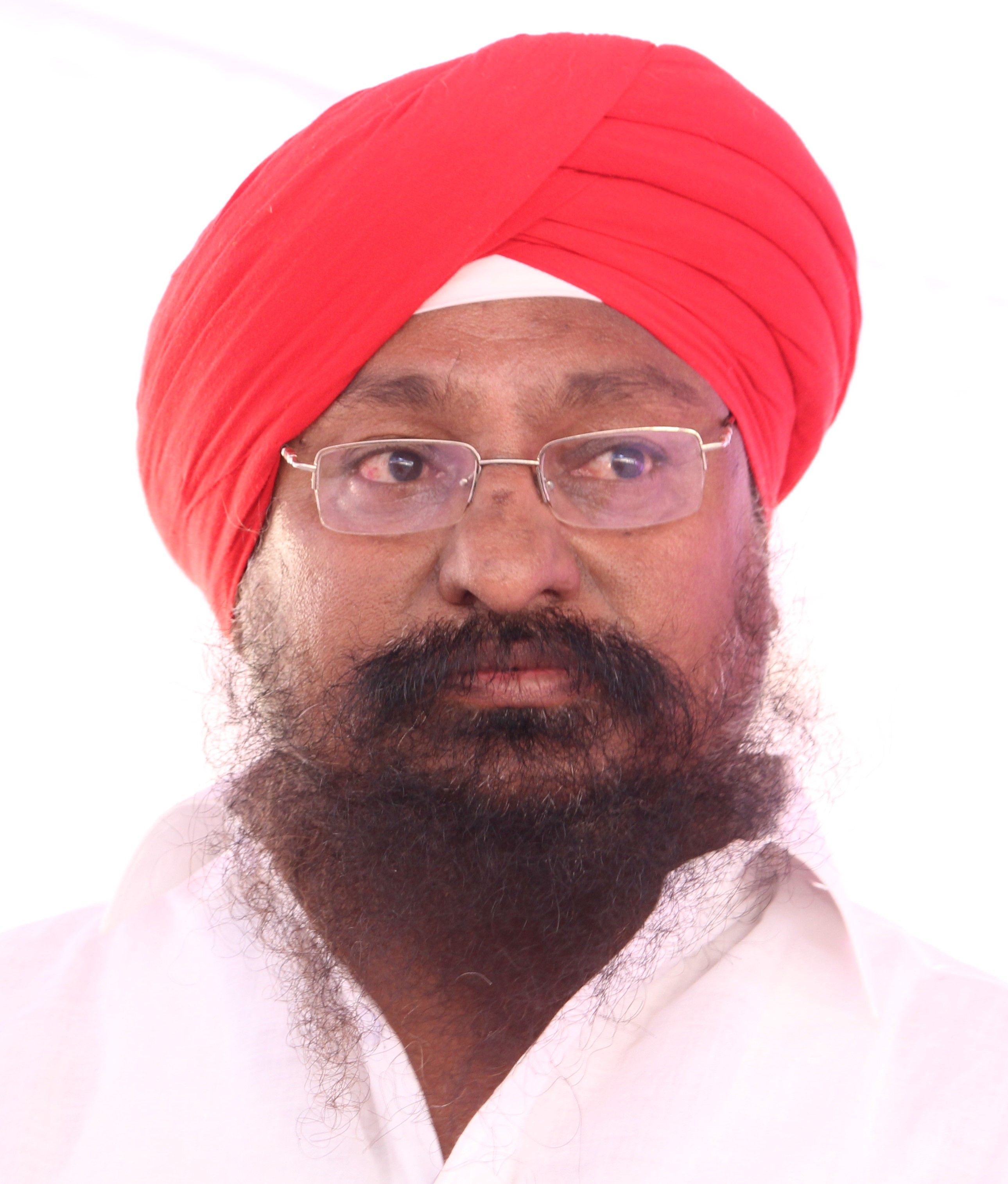

Chairman of Telangana State Civil Supplies Corporation Limited
- In office 08 December 2022 – 5 December 2023

Mayor of Karimnagar Municipal Corporation
- In office July 2014 – 2019

Personal details
- Born: 6 August 1964 (age 61) Karimnagar, Telangana, India
- Spouse: Balbeer Kaur
- Parent(s): Laxman Singh, Dannabhai
- Occupation: Politician

Sardar Ravinder Singh is an Indian politician. He served as the mayor of Karimnagar Municipal Corporation from July 2014 to 2019. Ravinder Singh quit TRS party and is contested MLC elections as an Independent candidate from Karimnagar Local Authorities Constituency.

== Early life ==
Sardar Ravinder Singh was born on 6 August 1964 in Karimnagar town to Laxman Singh and Dannabhai. He pursued degree from SRR Government Degree College, Karimnagar and L.L.B. from Nanded, Maharashtra. He has practiced in the Karimnagar Court and elected as President of Karimnagar Bar Association in 2008.

== Political career ==
Ravinder Singh started his political activities as a students' union leader in SRR Government Degree College and elected as college president in 1984 while pursuing his degree. He contested for Karimnagar Municipal Elections held in 1995 as an independent candidate and won as Councilor and later he joined Bharatiya Janata Party and elected as Councilor for the second time in 2000 & Corporator from Bjp in 2005 Karimnagar Municipal Corporation elections. He served as Karimnagar BJP town president from 1999 to 2006. He quit Bharatiya Janata Party and joined Telangana Rashtra Samithi in 2006 and took active leadership in the protests and demonstrations that were organized in support of the statehood movement in Karimnagar.

After formation of separate Telangana state Ravinder Singh Contested as Corpoartor from Trs party in 2014 Karimnagar Municipal Corporation elections and elected as Mayor for Karimnagar and became the first mayor from sikh community in South India & Chairman for Telangana Association of Mayors and chairman's. He was elected as Telangana Yoga Association chairman in November 2021. Ravinder Singh resigned from trs party on 26 November 2021 and contested MLC elections as an Independent candidate from Karimnagar Local Authorities Constituency. Ravinder Singh Later Joined TRS and he has been appointed as Telangana State Civil Supplies Corporation Limited Chairman on 8 December 2022. taken oath as Chairman of the Telangana State Civil Supplies Corporation Limited of Telangana State on 21 December 2022 and resigned from his post after the new Congress government formed in Telangana in December 2023.

Later in 2026 Karimnagar municipal elections he contested from 58th division from Brs and elected as corporator.
