= Kodangal =

- town
- Location in Telangana, India Kodangal (India)
- Coordinates: 17.107°N 77.627°E
- Country: India
- State: Telangana
- District: Vikarabad

Government
  - MLA: Anumula Revanth Reddy (Indian National Congress)

Population (2011)
  - Total: 14,294

Languages
  - Official: Telugu, Urdu
- Time zone: UTC+5:30 (IST)
  - Summer (DST): IST (UTC+05:30)
- Postal code: 509338
- Area code: 91-8505/08505
- Vehicle registration: TG 34
- Website: telangana.gov.in

Kodangal is a Town and Mandal in Vikarabad district, Telangana, India. The town is also categorized as a Tahsil, Mandal, or Taluka, and constitutes 20 villages.

The major mandals in the Kodangal Constituency area are:

- Kosgi
- Kodangal
- Bomraspet
- Doulathabad
- Maddur

== Assembly constituency ==
It is also a Legislative Assembly constituency of the Telangana state in India.
