= Kothur =

- Census town
- Location in Telangana, India Kothur (India)
- Coordinates: 17.144727°N 78.288574°E
- Country: India
- State: Telangana
- District: Ranga Reddy

Population
  - Total: 6,863

Languages
  - Official: Telugu
- Time zone: UTC+5:30 (IST)
- PIN: 509228
- Telephone code: 91-8548
- Vehicle registration: TG-07
- Website: telangana.gov.in

Kothur is a census town in Rangareddy district in the state of Telangana in India. It is situated about 36 km (22 mi) from Hyderabad, the state capital, near by Hyderabad International Airport in Hyderabad to Bangalore NH 7.

It is not to be confused with Kothur town in the Ranga Reddy district of Telangana, some 36 km north of Hyderabad

== Geography ==
Kothur is located at 17.144727°N 78.288574°E.

== See also ==
- Mahabubnagar
- Shadnagar
- Kummariguda
