= Bomraspet =

Coordinates: 17°36′N 78°37′E

Bommaraspet
- Interactive map of Bommaraspet
- Country: India
- State: Telangana
- Region: TS
- District: Hyderabad, Telangana

Languages
  - Official: Telugu
- Time zone: UTC+5:30 (IST)
- PIN: 500078
- Telephone code: 08505

Bommaraspet is a small village in Shamirpet Mandal Ranga Reddy district in Telangana, India. It falls under Medchal Consistution. Hyderabad is 23 km from the village.

It is home to Leonia Holistic Destination, Leo Academy of Hospitality, and Tourism Management college, and IVY League school is also located there.
