= Nalgonda Municipal Corporation =

Local civic body in Nalgonda, Telangana, India

Type
- Type: Municipal Corporation of the Nalgonda

Leadership
- Mayor: Burri Chaitanya Srinivas Reddy, INC
- Deputy Mayor: Mohammed Ashraf Ali Amer, INC

Structure
- Seats: 48
- Political groups: Government (27): INC (27); Opposition (21): BRS (9); BJP (4); AIFB (4); AIMIM (3); IND (1)

Elections
- Last election: 2026

Website
- Nalgonda Municipal Corporation

The Nalgonda Municipal Corporation (NMC) is the local governing body, administering the city of Nalgonda, Nalgonda district in the Indian state of Telangana.

The municipal corporation consists of democratically elected members, is headed by a mayor and administers the city's governance, infrastructure and administration. This city is selected under central government scheme of AMRUT.
