= Makhtal mandal =

Makthal
- Makthal (Telangana) Makthal (India)
- Coordinates: 16.502100°N 77.507500°E
- Country: India
- State: Telangana
- District: Narayanpet
- Elevation: 391 m (1,283 ft)

Languages
  - Official: Telugu
- Time zone: UTC+5:30 (IST)
- PIN: 509208
- Vehicle registration: TS 38
- Vidhan Sabha constituency: Makthal
- Climate: hot (Köppen)
- Website: telangana.gov.in

Makthal is a Mandal in Narayanpet district, Telangana. It is also an assembly constituency in the Telangana Legislative Assembly.

== Geography ==
Makthal is located at 16.502100°N 77.507500°E. It has an average elevation of 391 metres (1283 ft).

== Demography ==
According to The Imperial Gazetteer of India, Makhtal in 1901 was a taluk in Mahbubnagar district, Hyderabad State. It covers an area of 511 square miles. The population, spread over 120 villages, was 69,560, compared with 68,031 in 1891. The taluk headquarters Makhtal had a population of 4,476. in 1905, the taluk was enlarged by the addition of some villages from Narayanpet, but lost 31 villages to Yadgir in Gulbarga district. It has the famous temple called "Padamati Anjaneyya Swamy Temple" where god's statue stands in air without any support. Here is a famous temple Sri dattatreya swamy (kurumgadda & vallabapuram) which is located at Paspula village near to makthal(15 km)

== List of MLAs ==
Year	A. C. No.	Assembly Constituency Name	Type of A.C.	Winner Candidates Name	Gender	Party	Votes	Runner UP	Gender	Party	Votes
2018	77	Makthal	-	CHITTEM RAMMOHAN REDDY	-	Telangana Rashtra Samithi	78686	JALANDER REDDY	-	Independent	30371
2014	77	Makthal	GEN	Chittem Ram Mohan Reddy	Male	INC	51632	Yelkoti Yella Reddy	Male	TRS	41605
2009	77	Makthal	GEN	K.Dayakar Reddy	M	TDP	53261	Chittem Ram Mohan Reddy	M	INC	47560
2005	By Polls	Makthal	GEN	Chittemram Mohan Reddy	M	INC	64878	Sugappa	M	IND	24799
2004	199	Makthal	GEN	Chittem Narsi Reddy	M	INC	55375	Nagurao Namaji	M	BJP	53019
1999	199	Makthal	GEN	Y.Yella Reddy	M	TDP	55404	Chittem Narsi Reddy	M	INC	42841
1994	199	Makthal	GEN	Yella Reddy	M	TDP	41063	Nagu Rao	M	BJP	23585
1989	199	Makthal	GEN	Chitlem Narsi Reddy	M	JD	44256	G. Narsimulu Naidu	M	IND	35704
1985	199	Makthal	GEN	Chittam Narsireddy	M	JNP	45606	G. Narsimulu Naidu	M	TDP	19632
1983	199	Makthal	GEN	G. Narasimhulu Naidu	M	INC	27854	Yelkoti Yella Reddy	M	JNP	21614
1978	199	Makthal	GEN	Narsimlu	M	INC(I)	29627	Narsi Reddy C.	M	JNP	24471
1972	198	Makthal	GEN	Kalyani Ramchander Rao	M	INC		Uncontested			
1967	198	Makthal	GEN	K. R. Rao	M	INC	23130	S. Rao	M	IND	21093
1962	202	Makthal	GEN	Kalyani Ramchander Rao	M	INC	23816	Bhagoji Ambadas Rao	M	IND	10321
1957	7	Makthal	(SC)	Bannappa	M	IND	21152	Basappa (Sc)	M	INC	17314
