= Mancherial Municipal Corporation =

Local civic body in Mancherial, Telangana, India

Type
- Type: Municipal Corporation of the Mancherial

Leadership
- Mayor: Dharni Madhukar, INC since Feb 2026
- Deputy Mayor: Salla Ramya Mahesh, INC
- Municipal Commissioner: Thoutam Shivaji

Structure
- Seats: 60
- Political groups: Government (44): INC (44); Opposition (16): BRS (8); BJP (5); AIFB (2); JSP (1)

Elections
- First election: 2026
- Last election: 2026
- Next election: 2031

Website
- Mancherial Municipal Corporation

The Mancherial Municipal Corporation(MMC) is the local governing body, administering the city of Mancherial, Mancherial district in the Indian state of Telangana.

The municipal corporation consists of democratically elected members, is headed by a mayor and administers the city's governance, infrastructure and administration. This city is selected under central government scheme of AMRUT.

== History ==
The Mancherial Municipality was originally constituted as a third-grade municipality in 1952. It was subsequently upgraded to first-grade municipality status in 2003 to accommodate the growing population and urban needs. In January 2025, the Government of Telangana elevated it to the status of a Municipal Corporation through an official gazette notification dated January 4, 2025, thereby establishing the Mancherial Municipal Corporation as the civic governing body for the expanded urban area. The first municipal corporation elections were held in February 2026, marking a significant milestone in the city's administrative evolution.

== Administration ==
Mancherial Municipal corporation has a total of 60 divisions with an average of 3,030 voters in each. Mancherial is headed by an elected Mayor and a Municipal Commissioner appointed by the State Government. Municipal Corporation of Mancherial is part of the Mancherial Urban Development Authority.
