= Maddur, Narayanpet =

Maddur
- Municipality
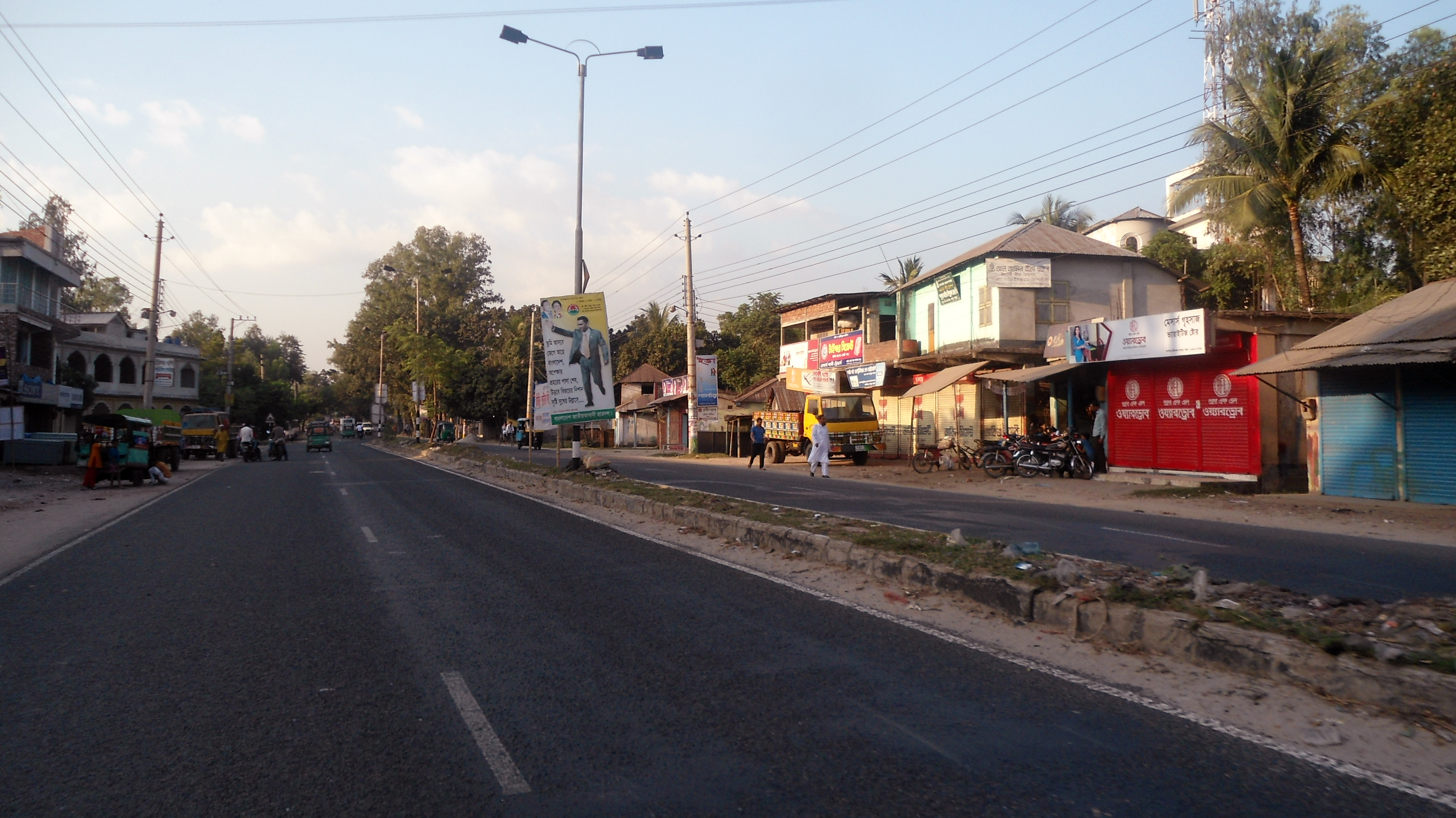
- Maddur is famous for Hanuman temple OLD BUSTAND
- Nickname: Madduru
- Interactive map of Maddur
- Maddur (Narayanpet), ( Mahabubnagar), (Telangana) Maddur (India)
- Coordinates: 16.860200°N 77.612100°E
- Country: India
- State: Telangana
- Named after: Venkat Rao

Government
  - Type: Mandal Headquarters and Municipality
  - Body: Telangana

Area Maddur mdr
  - Total: 56 km^{2} (22 sq mi)
  - Rank: 3
- Elevation: 538 m (1,765 ft)

Population (2025)
  - Total: 13,162
  - Rank: 3
  - Density: 240/km^{2} (610/sq mi)

Languages
  - Official: Telugu
- Time zone: UTC+5:30 (IST)
- 509411: 509411
- Vehicle registration: TG-06
- Climate: hot (Köppen)
- Website: telangana.gov.in
- Town in Telangana

Maddur is a town, municipality in Telangana of Kodangal constituency, well connected to towns Narayanpet, Mahbubnagar, Kosgi, Tandur, Gurmatkal had the (14,350) population, 16 Wards, (4,325) Abodes in this Town.

Maddur Municipal Officers - Elected in 2026

Election Was held on - °11th February 2026.

°Results on - °13th February 2026.

°Elected Chairperson/Vice on - 17th February 2026.

For 16 Wards - (16 Municipal Councillors)

9 - (INC), 6 - (BRS), 1 - Independent

•Commissioner : Srikanth

•Chairperson : Dillikar Saraswathi

•Vice-chairperson : Bhagyashri

Councillors - 16 Wards

1. Sangeeta Sabavath - (INC)
2. Munkanpalli Narsimulu - (BRS)
3. Mounika - INC
4. Jajaraopally Gopal - (BRS)
5. Lingya Nayak - (BRS)
6. BhagyaShri - (INC)
7. Srilatha - (INC)
8. Krishnaveni - (IND)
9. Mahmood - (INC)
10. Gaddamedi Govind - (INC)
11. Chalka Sanjeevulu - (INC)
12. Sangita - (BRS)
13. Jogu Laxmi - (INC)
14. Md. Moulana - (BRS)
15. Kallapu Dinesh - (BRS)
16. Saraswathi - (INC) #Elected as a chairperson.

Villages Merged in Municipality are :

( Renvatla, Bheempur, Nagampalle, Sapancheru Thanda, Errakunta Thanda ).

Neighbourhood :

Renivatla Ammargadda, Bheempur, Srinivasa Colony, Teachers Colony, BC Colony, SC Colony.

== Geography ==
Maddur is located at 16.8667°N 77.6167°E. It has an average elevation of 503 metres (1653 ft).

== Villages ==
The villages in Maddur mandal include:

- Appireddi Palle achampalli
- Bhooned/Buneed
- Chanwar
- Chennareddipally
- Krishna Naik Gtanka, Pedripad
- Damaganpuram
- Dorepalle
- Duppatghat
- Gokulnagar
- Jadavaraopally
- Kajipuram
- Kisannagar
- Kommuru
- Kothapalle
- Lingalched
- MADDUR ( MDR )
- Mannapur
- Mominapur
- Nagireddipally
- Nandigam
- Nandipad
- Nidjintha
- Pallerla
- Pedripahad KRISHNA NAYAK TANDA
- Renvatla
- Thimmareddipalle* PEDRIPAD TANDA

== Geography ==
This town is well connected to district headquarters Mahabubnagar, maddur, narayanpeta and Kosgi by road. It is 40 km far from mahabubnagar, for every one hour two buses fly between mahaboobnagar and this town . This town is famous for Anjaneya Temple. population of this town: ~2500 sex ratio: ~0.98(98 per females per 100 males) official languages:Telugu, Urdu crops: rice, cotton, ground nut

This town is well connected to district headquarters Narayanpet, Mahabubnagar, Kosgi, Ravulapally, Gurmitkal by road. It is 30 km far from mahabubnagar, for every one hour two buses fly between mahabubnagar and Maddur town . The town is famous for Shivaji Temple. population of this town: ~600
