= Gurramguda =

- Municipal Corporation
- Location in Telangana, India Gurramguda (Telangana) Gurramguda (India)
- Coordinates: 17.295285°N 78.566669°E
- Country: India
- State: Telangana

Government
  - Type: democratic

Population (2011)
  - Total: More than 10,000

Languages
  - Official: Telugu
- Time zone: UTC+5:30 (IST)
- PIN: 501510
- Telephone code: 040
- Vehicle registration: TS 07 X XXXX
- Sex ratio: 972 women per 1000 men ♂/♀

Gurramguda is a town in Ranga Reddy District (Hyderabad), Telangana, India. It is part of Badangpet Municipal Corporation. Gurramguda is 12 kilometers from Hyderabad, 6 kilometers from LB Nagar and 3 kilometers from Vanastalipuram.

Gurramguda is bordered by Vanastalipuram to the North West, Almasguda to the west, Nadergul to the south, Injapur to north east and Turkayamjal to the south east.
