= Mahabubnagar Municipal Corporation =

Local civic body in Mahabubnagar, Telangana, India

Type
- Type: Municipal Corporation of the Mahabubnagar

Leadership
- Mayor: G. Mamatha, INC
- Deputy Mayor: Surender Reddy, INC

Structure
- Seats: 60
- Political groups: Government (37): INC (29); AIMIM (3); IND (5); Opposition (23): BRS (15); BJP (8)

Elections
- Last election: 2026

Website
- Mahabubnagar Municipal Corporation

The Mahabubnagar Municipal Corporation (MMC) is the local governing body, administering the city of Mahabubnagar, Mahabubnagar district in the Indian state of Telangana.

The municipal corporation consists of democratically elected members, is headed by a mayor and administers the city's governance, infrastructure and administration. This city is selected under central government scheme of AMRUT.
