= Kosgi =

- Municipality
- The Tehsildar office complex

- Kosgi (Telangana) Kosgi (India)
- Coordinates: 16.987800°N 77.716900°E
- Country: India
- State: Telangana
- District: Narayanpet

Government
  - Sarpanch: Nagulapally Srilatha
- Elevation: 540 m (1,770 ft)

Population (2001)
  - Total: 21,038

Languages
  - Official: Telugu
- Time zone: UTC+5:30 (IST)
- PIN: 509339
- Telephone code: 918505
- Vehicle registration: TS
- Sex ratio: 1011 ♂/♀
- Website: telangana.gov.in

Kosgi is a municipality in Narayanpet district of Telangana state in India. It has a population of 21,038 (Census 2001). It is a part of Kodangal constituency of the Telangana state's Legislative Assembly. The notable towns nearby Kosgi are Tandur, Kodangal, Mahabubnagar, Pargi and Maddur, Narayanpet Narayanpet.

== Kosgi Mandal ==
Kosgi is the headquarters of the Kosgi Municipality, which comprises 24 villages. The administration of this mandal is run from the Mandal revenue office in Kosgi.

The villages which come under Kosgi Mandal are Amlikunta, Balabhadraipalle, Balwanpally, Bhakthimalla, Bhogaram, Bijjaram, Chandravancha, Chennaram, Hanuman pally, Gundmal, Kadampalle, Kosgi, Kothapalle, Malreddipally, Masaipally, Mirzapur, Mudireddipalle, Mungimalla, Mushrifa, Nacharam, Pothireddy Pally, Sampally, Sarjakhanpet, Thogapur and Lodhipur.

== Education ==
The Government boys hostel

The First Government Engineering College is started at KOSGI from the Academic Year 2024-25 onwards by upgrading the existing Government Polytechnic. This Institute is affiliated to Jawaharlal Nehru Technological University (JNTUH), Hyderabad and function under the control of Department of Technical Education, Telanagana. The Institute offers B.Tech Courses in Computer Science and Engineering and its allied branches viz CSE, CSM and CSD. Hostel facility available for boys.

There is at least one state government's school and/or the Zilla Parishad High Schools (ZPHS) in all the villages in Kosgi mandal. Most of these are primary schools. The major educational institutions in Kosgi mandal are:

Schools in Kosgi are ZPHS, ZPHS (boys), ZPHS Girls (Urdu Medium), SriVani Vidya Mandir (EM), Shanthi Nikethan high school (EM), Govt. high school, Veda techno school, Rainbow high school, Krishnaveni Talent School, Panini High School, Govt. Junior college and Prajna junior college.

Apart from these, the major schools in other parts of the mandal are ZPHS schools in Mirjapur, Gundumal, Mushrifa and Sarjkhan Pet. Higher secondary, Intermediate and higher education institutions are situated only in Kosgi town.

== NGO support ==
Due to financial constraints the government of Telangana state has instituted a policy to actively seek private/NGO adoption of government schools. As part of this, the NGOs like Asha for education and Bhumi are helping to improve the education in Kosgi mandal. The Silicon Valley chapter of Asha organization is funding one of such project named Balavikas in Kosgi. The groundwork is taken up by Bhumi. This project aims to improve infrastructure, and teaching quality in selected educational institutions in Kosgi.'PVRMES' is one of the NGO primarily donated a school building to Govt. Upper Primary School in Pothireddypally (vill) and the school was renamed to "Pullangari Venkat Reddy Memorial upper primary school" in the year of 2004.'PVRMES' then concentrated on delivering basic infrastructure, needs of poor students in the constituency.

== Migration ==
The declining economic feasibility of agriculture and increasing debts of the farmers in Kosgi mandal has forced them to migrate to the metropolitan cities like Hyderabad and especially Mumbai, where they work mostly as laborer in construction work. The government's efforts, to restore the normal situation using projects like Self Help Groups and Food for Work program have been ineffective.

== See also ==
- Kodangal
