= Karimnagar Municipal Corporation =

Local civic body in Karimnagar, Telangana, India

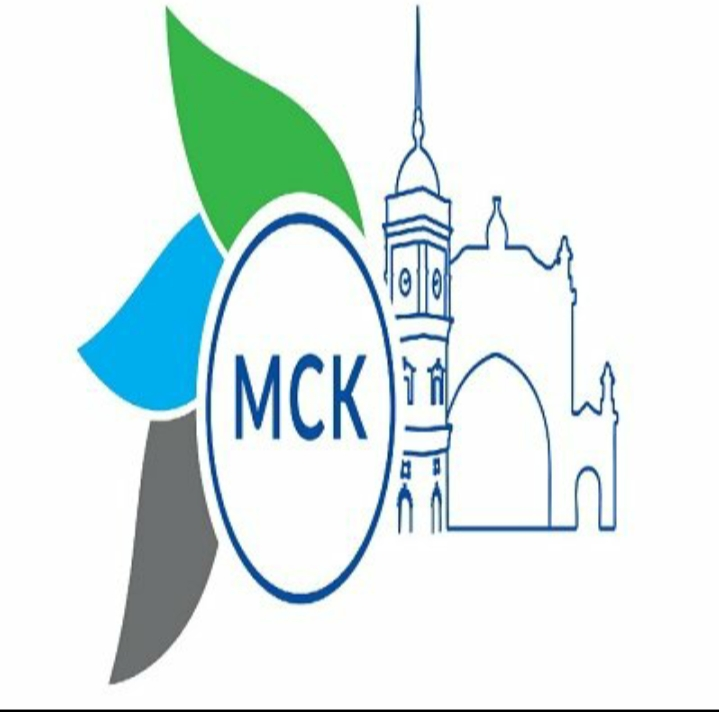

Type
- Type: Municipal Corporation

History
- Founded: 2005; 21 years ago

Leadership
- Mayor: Kolagani Srinivas, BJP since 2026
- Deputy Mayor: Sunil Rao, BJP since 2026
- Municipal commissioner: Praful Desai, IAS

Structure
- Seats: 66+ 3 Ex-officio
- Political groups: Government (39): BJP (35); Ex-officio (1); Opposition (34): INC (18); BRS (9); AIMIM (4); IND (2); Ex-officio (2)

Elections
- Last election: 2026

Meeting place
- MCK Building

Website
- Karimnagar Municipal Corporation

The Karimnagar Municipal Corporation (KMC) is the local governing body, administering the city of Karimnagar in the Indian state of Telangana. It is the Third Most Populous city in Telangana with a population of 6,50,000. The municipal corporation is headed by a mayor and democratically elected members.

== History ==
The Municipality status was constituted in 1931 and upgraded as Karimnagar municipality in 1941. Then it was upgraded as Karimngar Municipal Corporation on 5 March 2005 vide GONo:109.

Karimnagar Municipal Corporation is spread over an area of 50 km^{2}. In 2019 few villages merged with the Municipal Corporation of Karimnagar. MCK is spread across two assembly constituencies. MCK covers major population of Karimnagar assembly constituency and smaller population from Manakondur assembly constituency. Karimnagar assembly constituency has 58 divisions and Manakondur has 2 divisions of MCK. Few more villages were planned to merge with the MCK but later it was postponed for future plans. The Telangana High Court has suggested to add the villages till Manakondur, Thimmapur, Kothapalli on the city outskirts but later this was not taken into consideration.

== Demographics ==
The city of Karimnagar is spread over an area of 50 km^{2}. It has a population of more than 650,000. According to the election commission of Telangana, the city has a total of 368,269 voters for 2026 Municipal Corporation of Karimnagar elections.

== Administration ==
Karimnagar municipal corporation has a total of 66 divisions with an average of 4,550 voters in each. Karimnagar is headed by an elected Mayor and a Municipal Commissioner appointed by the State Government. Municipal Corporation of Karimnagar is part of the Satavahana Urban Development Authority.

== Politics ==
The major municipal news in 2005 was the upgrade of Karimnagar town from a Municipality to a Municipal Corporation. In the 2005 Municipal polls, MCK had elections for 50 divisions. TDP won 15 seats, INC won 13 seats, AIMIM won 9 seats, BRS won 1 seat, BJP won 1 seat and Independents won the remaining 10 seats. The first-ever elections for the Mayor and Deputy Mayor of the newly formed Karimnagar Municipal Corporation were held in 2005. The INC won the Mayor seat with the support of AIMIM and Independents. D Shankar of INC was elected as First Mayor and Mohammed Abbas Sami of AIMIM as First Deputy Mayor.

In the 2014 Municipal polls, MCK had elections for 50 divisions. The BRS won 24 seats, INC won 14, AIMIM won 2, TDP and BJP won one each and Independents won the remaining 8 seats. The BRS won the Mayor seat with the support of AIMIM and 3 Independents. Sardar Ravinder Singh was elected as Mayor and Guggilapu Ramesh as Deputy Mayor.

In the 2020 Municipal polls, MCK had elections for 58 out of 60 divisions as two divisions were won by the BRS unanimously before the polls. After the results BRS emerged as the winner with 33 seats. BJP won 13, AIMIM won 6 and Independents won 8 seats. Later 8 Independents joined the BRS party making their total strength to 47 with the support of AIMIM. Y Sunil Rao was elected as Mayor and Challa Swaroopa Rani as Deputy Mayor. In 2024, the outgoing mayor Y Sunil Rao joined the BJP.

In the 2026 Municipal polls, MCK had elections for 66 out of 66 divisions. After the results, BJP emerged as the winner with 30 seats. INC won 14 seats, BRS won 9, AIMIM won 4 and Independents won 8 seats. Later 4 Independents and 1 AIFB councillor joined the BJP party making their total strength to 35. Kolagani Srinivas was elected as Mayor and Sunil Rao as Deputy Mayor.
