= Sangareddy Municipal Council =

Local civic body in Telangana, India

Sangareddy Municipal Council సంగారెడ్డి మున్సిపల్ కౌన్సిల్

Type
- Type: Municipal council

History
- Founded: 1954; 72 years ago

Leadership
- Commissioner: M. Srinivas Reddy
- Chairperson: Kuna Vanitha, INC since 16 February 2026
- Vice chairperson: Shaik Shafi Ahmed, INC since 16 February 2026

Structure
- Political groups: Government (22): INC (22); Official opposition (10): BRS (10); Other opposition (6): BJP (2); Others (4)

Elections
- Last election: 2026
- Next election: 2031

Website
- sangareddymunicipality.telangana.gov.in

The Sangareddy Municipality, classified as a first grade municipality with 38 election wards, was created in 1954. It is the urban local body of the town of Sangareddy. The jurisdiction of the civic body is spread over an area of 24.58 km^{2} (9.49 sq mi).

== Demographics ==
The Sangareddy Municipality had a population of 88,756 as of the 2011 census, and is estimated to have around a population of around 100,000 in 2023. As of the 2011 census, there were 12,002 (13.5%) scheduled castes and 1,554 (1.7%) scheduled tribes.

There are 70,403 registered voters in the municipality.

== Members ==
No.	Constituency	Name	Party	Remarks
1	Ward No. 1	Kummari Krishna	Indian National Congress	
2	Ward No. 2	Naikoti Swathi	Bharatiya Janata Party	
3	Ward No. 3	Jagadeeshwar Kondapuram	Bharatiya Janata Party	
4	Ward No. 4	Turapathi Shobarani	Indian National Congress	
5	Ward No. 5	Nimra Farha	All India Majlis-e-Ittehadul Muslimeen	
6	Ward No. 6	Mohammed Kaja Nawajoddin	Indian National Congress	
7	Ward No. 7	Mogulla Vamshi Krishna	Indian National Congress	
8	Ward No. 8	Karre Suresh	Bharat Rashtra Samithi	
9	Ward No. 9	Karkam Srilatha	Indian National Congress	
10	Ward No. 10	Banuri Shailesh Reddy	Indian National Congress	
11	Ward No. 11	Ponna Dasharath Reddy	Bharat Rashtra Samithi	
12	Ward No. 12	Ponna Rajender Reddy	Bharat Rashtra Samithi	
13	Ward No. 13	Begari Veena Kumari	Indian National Congress	
14	Ward No. 14	Gopanna Venkata Ramanna	Independent	
15	Ward No. 15	D Sushmitha	Indian National Congress	
16	Ward No. 16	Kothapally Srikanth	Bharat Rashtra Samithi	
17	Ward No. 17	Talari Jyothi	Indian National Congress	
18	Ward No. 18	Gandla Preethi	Independent	
19	Ward No. 19	Gurram Jhansi	Indian National Congress	
20	Ward No. 20	Anees Sultana	Indian National Congress	
21	Ward No. 21	Topaji Veena	Indian National Congress	
22	Ward No. 22	Mukurala Srikanth Goud	Indian National Congress	
23	Ward No. 23	Kuna Vanitha	Indian National Congress	
24	Ward No. 24	Ulfath Sulthana	Indian National Congress	
25	Ward No. 25	Ayesha Sultana	Indian National Congress	
26	Ward No. 26	Shaik Shafi Ahmed	Indian National Congress	
27	Ward No. 27	Nakka Manjulatha	Bharat Rashtra Samithi	
28	Ward No. 28	Gundelwar Sangeetha	Indian National Congress	
29	Ward No. 29	Begari Srikanth	Bharat Rashtra Samithi	
30	Ward No. 30	G Manisha	Indian National Congress	
31	Ward No. 31	Jaggari Satish Reddy	Indian National Congress	
32	Ward No. 32	Nayekoti Ashwini	Bharat Rashtra Samithi	
33	Ward No. 33	Vislavath Ravinder	Indian National Congress	
34	Ward No. 34	Samreen Begum	Independent	
35	Ward No. 35	Kadumanchi Narsamma	Indian National Congress	
36	Ward No. 36	Lade Maneela	Bharat Rashtra Samithi	
37	Ward No. 37	Balavanthula Jalandhar Rao	Bharat Rashtra Samithi	
38	Ward No. 38	Mohammed Zafaruddin	Bharat Rashtra Samithi	
