= Kohir =

- Municipal Council
- Nickname: Red Land
- Location in Telangana, India Kohir (India)
- Coordinates: 17.6000°N 77.7167°E
- Country: India
- State: Telangana
- District: Sangareddy district

Government
  - Type: Municipal Council
  - Body: Kohir Municipality

Area
  - Total: 4 km^{2} (1.5 sq mi)

Population (2011)
  - Total: 18,000
  - Density: 4,500/km^{2} (12,000/sq mi)
- Time zone: UTC+5:30 (IST)
- PIN: 502210
- Vehicle registration: TS 15
- Lok Sabha constituency: Zahirabad
- Assembly constituency: Zahirabad
- Website: https://sangareddy.telangana.gov.in

Kohir is a town and Municipal Council in Sangareddy district of the Indian state of Telangana. It serves as the headquarters of Kohir mandal and is situated on the Deccan Plateau near the Telangana–Karnataka border.

The town is locally known for its distinctive red soil, which has historically influenced traditional construction practices and agricultural activities in the region.

== History ==
Kohir lies on the Deccan Plateau and has historically functioned as an agrarian settlement. Archaeological remains such as hero stones (veeragallu) found in the Sangareddy region indicate early habitation by warrior and farming communities.

During the medieval period, the region formed part of various Deccan kingdoms and later came under the Hyderabad State ruled by the Nizams. After Indian independence, Kohir became part of Medak district. Following the district reorganisation in Telangana in 2016, Kohir mandal was included in Sangareddy district.

Kohir was administered as a gram panchayat for several decades before being upgraded to a Municipal Council ahead of the 2026 local body elections to accommodate increasing administrative and urban requirements.

== Geography ==
Kohir is characterised by red and black soils typical of northern Telangana. The area largely depends on borewells and seasonal rainfall for irrigation. Agricultural land surrounds the town, supporting both food and horticultural crops.

== Demographics ==
According to the 2011 Census of India, Kohir had a population of approximately 18,000. The town's population is largely dependent on agriculture and allied occupations for livelihood.

== Administration ==
Kohir is governed by the Kohir Municipal Council under the Telangana Municipalities Act. The council comprises elected ward members and a Chairperson. Municipal elections are conducted by the Telangana State Election Commission.

== Economy ==
The local economy of Kohir is primarily agrarian. Major crops include paddy, maize, pulses, ginger, and fruits such as guava and mango. Small-scale trade and service activities support the agricultural economy.

== 2026 Municipal Council elections ==
The 2026 Kohir Municipal Council election was the first municipal election conducted after Kohir was declared a municipality. Elections were held for 16 wards under the supervision of the Telangana State Election Commission.

== Ward-wise party-wise candidate list ==
Candidates contesting in Kohir Municipality elections
Ward No.	Reservation	Bharat Rashtra Samithi (BRS)	Indian National Congress (INC)	Bharatiya Janata Party (BJP)	All India Majlis-e-Ittehadul Muslimeen (AIMIM)	Independent
1	UR (Women)	—	L. Jagadishwar	—	—	—
2	SC (General)	Nagarigari Sampath Kumar	Talari Sathish Kumar	No candidate	—	—
3	ST (General)	Ashok Kumar E.	Jajja Srikanth	No candidate	No candidate	No candidate
4	SC (General)	Pinjariwale Ashok	M. Ashok	—	—	—
5	SC (Women)	Myathari Aparanjitha	Rajeshwari (W/o Shivashankar)	—	Myathari Vinaya Sheela	Kotagouni Anitha
6	BC (General)	—	Mohd. Ahmed	—	—	—
7	UR (General)	—	M. A. Hannan Javeed	—	—	—
8	UR (General)	—	Akshay Jade	—	—	—
9	UR (Women)	—	Edigi Bhulakshmi (W/o Edigi Vitthal)	—	—	—
10	UR (Women)	—	Yasmeen Begum (W/o M. A. Waheed)	—	—	—
11	BC (General)	Mohammed Abdul Kaleem	Jakkargari Gabriel	No candidate	No candidate	No candidate
12	SC (Women)	Ashwini Potharaju	Nanchari Shirishna (D/o Nanchari Ratnaiah)	—	—	—
13	UR (General)	—	Mohd. Shakir Ali	—	—	—
14	UR (Women)	—	Md Shoukath Ali	—	—	—
15	BC (Women)	Sana Siddiqua	S. Hina Maheen (W/o Md. Abdul Mubasshir)	—	—	—
16	UR (Women)	—	Md Javeed	—	—	—

== Transport ==
Kohir is connected to Zahirabad and other nearby towns through district and state roads. Public transportation is primarily provided by Telangana State Road Transport Corporation (TSRTC) bus services.

== Geography ==
Kohir is located at 17.6000°N 77.7167°E. It has an average elevation of 627 metres (2060 ft). It is 100 km from Hyderabad, 53 km from Bidar and 21 km from Zaheerabad.

== Demographics ==
According to the Indian census, 2011, the demographic details of Kohir Mandal are as follows:

- Total Population: 55,239 in 9,596 households.
- Male Population: 28,402 and Female Population: 26,837
- Children Under 6 years: 8,719 (Boys: 4,534, and Girls: 4,185)
- Total Literates: 26,451

Kohir village has a population of 14,077 in 2011. The male population was 7,243 and the female population was 6,834.
