= Telangana State Election Commission =

Indian state electoral agency

- Power of people is the Tower of Democracy

State Election Commission overview
- Formed: September 2014 (11 years ago)
- Jurisdiction: Telangana
- Headquarters: Hyderabad
- State Election Commission executives: C PARTHA SARATHI, IAS Rtd, State Election Commissioner; M. Ashok Kumar, Secretary
- Website: http://tsec.gov.in

The Telangana State Election Commission officially, State Election Commission of Telangana, is an autonomous, independent Constitutional and Statutory authority of Telangana. It was formed under the Constitution of India as per the provisions of the 73rd and 74th Amendments Acts of 1992. All Local Body elections of Telangana are conducted by this agency.

== Structure ==
The Election Commission is headed by a State Election Commissioner appointed by the Governor of Telangana. State Election Commissioner holds his term for six years or until attaining the age of 62, whichever is earlier. Usually, Commissioners are appointed in the rank of Principal Secretary to Govt. of Telangana.The State Election Commissioner of Telangana is Partha Sarathi Garu

== Functions ==
The Election Commission monitors the work relating to the conduct of General Elections and Bye-Elections local bodies within the state sanctioned by 73rd and 74th constitutional amendment acts.

Elections to the Rural and Urban bodies of Telangana are held by both direct and indirect elections. The sole controlling authority rests on the Telangana State Election Commission.

Electoral rolls are as per the electoral rolls of Telangana Legislative Assembly constituency. Polling stations are then identified based on the rolls. Following the notification for elections, similar norms followed as for the assembly elections.

=== Direct elections ===
Elections to the following posts are held by this commission by Direct election.

- Rural Bodies :
1. Members of the Zilla Parishad Territorial Constituency (ZPTC)
2. Members of the Mandal Parishad Territorial Constituency (MPTC)
3. Gram Panchayat Sarpanch
4. Gram Panchayat Ward Member
- Urban Bodies :

The urban bodies consists of Municipal Corporations, Municipalitiess.

1. Corporators of Municipal Corporation
2. Councillors of Municipality

=== Indirect elections ===
Indirect elections are held for the following positions: After the assumption of charge by the elected candidates, Indirect elections are held in the allocated time by the local bodies.

- Rural Bodies :
1. Upa-sarpanch of Gram Panchayat.

Chairperson and vice-chairpersons in Zilla Parishad by ZPTC members.

MPP’s [ Mandal Praja Parishad Presidents] by MPTC members.

- Urban Bodies :
1. Mayor and Deputy-Mayor of the Municipal corporations
2. Chairperson and vice-chairperson in Municipalities
