= Bheemgal =

Bheemgal kaspa
- Town
- Location in Telangana, India Bheemgal (India)
- Coordinates: 18.7000°N 78.4667°E
- Country: India
- State: Telangana
- District: Nizamabad
- Elevation: 376 m (1,234 ft)

Population (1990)
  - Total: 57,262 by DJPS

Languages
  - Official: Telugu
- Time zone: UTC+5:30 (IST)
- PIN: 503307
- Telephone code: 08463
- Vehicle registration: TS
- Nearest town: Armoor
- Vidhan Sabha constituency: Balkonda
- Website: telangana.gov.in

Bheemgal is a town in the Nizamabad district, in the state of Telangana in India, 52.2 km from the main city of the District, Nizamabad and 172 km from the State Capital Hyderabad.Bheemgal (BMGL) has new bus depot which was reopened recently in Telangana government.

== Demographics ==
Total population of Bheemgal Mandal is 57,262 living in 12,239 Houses, Spread across total 24 villages and 18 panchayats. Males are 27,924 and Females are 29,338.
