= Isnapur =

Isnapur ఇస్నాపూర్
- Municipality
- Location in Telangana, India Isnapur (Telangana) Isnapur (India)
- Coordinates: 17°32′55″N 78°12′37″E
- Country: India
- State: Telangana
- District: Sangareddy district
- Municipality Formed: 13 August 2025

Government
  - Type: Urban Local Body
  - Body: Isnapur Municipality
  - Chairperson: Mote Suma Latha (BRS)
  - Vice-Chairperson: Patlolla Madhavi (BRS)
- Time zone: UTC+5:30 (IST)
- PIN: 502307
- Vehicle registration: TG
- Website: telangana.gov.in

Isnapur is a Municipality in the Sangareddy district of Telangana, India. Formerly a census town, it was upgraded to a municipality in 2024. Following the 2026 urban local body elections, Mote Suma Latha was elected as the first Chairperson.

== Governance ==
Isnapur is administered by the Isnapur Municipality, which consists of 26 wards. In the first municipal elections held in January 2026, the results produced a hung verdict: the Bharat Rashtra Samithi (BRS) emerged as the single largest party with 12 wards, the Indian National Congress (INC) won 10 wards, and 4 wards were won by Independents.

A special meeting to elect the Chairperson was held on 16 February 2026. Mote Suma Latha (BRS) was elected as the Chairperson and Patlolla Madhavi(BRS) as the Vice-Chairperson. The BRS secured the required majority of 14 votes by utilizing the ex-officio votes of Patancheru MLA Gudem Mahipal Reddy and Medak MP M. Raghunandan Rao.

== Demographics ==
As of 2012 India census, Isnapur had a population of 17564. Males constitute 53% of the population and females 47%. Isnapur has an average literacy rate of 59%, lower than the national average of 59.5%: male literacy is 68%, and female literacy is 49%. In Isnapur, 15% of the population is under 6 years of age.
