= Raikal =

Municipality in Telangana, India

Raikal Ravikanti
- Town
- Raikal, ravikanti
- Nickname: Raikanti
- Location in Telangana, India Raikal (India)
- Coordinates: 18.9°N 78.8°E
- Country: India
- State: Telangana
- District: Jagtial
- Established: 1302 a.d
- Named for: Gudikota-temple

Government
  - Type: Council
  - Body: Municipal Council of Raikal

Population
  - Total: 86,735

Languages
  - Official: Telugu
- Time zone: UTC+5:30 (IST)
- PIN: 505460
- Telephone code: 08724
- Vehicle registration: TS-21
- Nearest city: Jagtial and korutla
- Lok Sabha constituency: Nizamabad
- Vidhan Sabha constituency: Jagtial
- Website: telangana.gov.in

Raikal is a town and headquarters of raikal mandal located in the Jagtial district, Telangana, India

It is known for being the home place of the ancient temple of Keshavanathaswamy, which was built in 1304 A.D. by Kakatiya King Prataparudra and is called as Kota Gudi, due to the mud fort that surrounds the temple. The temple is a trikutalayam which houses three sanctums for Shiva and Vishnu, and resembles the typical Chalukyan and Kakatiya architectural styles.

National Highway 61 connecting Bhiwandi in Maharashtra and Jagityal in Telangana, passes through Raikal.

There are 20 villages under Raikal Mandal Kendram Allipur is the main gram panchayat in the Mandal with an estimated population of 10,000 in 2020 which makes it as one of the biggest gram panchayaths in the jagtial district.
