= Aliabad, Ranga Reddy district =

Aliabad
- Village
- Location in Telangana, India Aliabad (India)
- Coordinates: 17°37′32″N 78°35′43″E
- Country: India
- State: Telangana

Languages
  - Official: Telugu
- Time zone: UTC+5:30 (IST)
- Telephone code: 040
- Vehicle registration: AP 26 X XXXX
- Sex ratio: 1:1(approx) ♂/♀
- Website: telangana.gov.in

Aliabad is a village in Rangareddy district in Telangana, India. It falls under Shamirpet mandal.
