= Waddepalle, Mahabubnagar =

Waddepally
- Municipality
- Location in Telangana, India
- Coordinates: 15.935892°N 77.841731°E
- Country: India
- State: Telangana state
- District: Jogulamba Gadwal

Population (2011)
  - Total: 10,463

Languages
  - Official: Telugu
- Time zone: UTC+5:30 (IST)
- PIN: 509126
- Telephone code: 08502
- Vehicle registration: TG-33
- Constituency: Alampur
- Climate: Cool&Nice (Köppen)
- Avg. summer temperature: 45 °C (113 °F)
- Avg. winter temperature: 25 °C (77 °F)

Waddepalle or Waddepally is a Village and Mandal in Jogulamba Gadwal district, Telangana. It is administered under Gadwal Revenue Division. Waddepally is a historical village and mandal. Its PIN code is 509126.

== Geography ==
Wadepalle is located on the northern bank of River Krishna south bank of Tungabadra River.

== Demographics ==
As of 2011 Census of India, Waddepalle had a population of 10,463. The total population constitute, 5,226 males and 5,237 females with a sex ratio of 1002 females per 1000 males. 1,219 children are in the age group of 0–6 years, a ratio of 966 girls per 1000 boys. The average literacy rate stands at 61.64%, slightly lower than the state average of 67.41%.
