= Bichkunda =

Bichkunda Bichkonda
- Village
- Location in Telangana, India Bichkunda (India)
- Coordinates: 18.4000°N 77.7167°E
- Country: India
- State: Telangana
- District: Nizambad

Government
  - Type: Mandal
  - Body: Mandal Parishad of Bichkunda
- Elevation: 372 m (1,220 ft)

Population (2011)
  - Total: 64,044

Telugu, Marati and kannada
  - Official: Telugu
- Time zone: UTC+5:30 (IST)
- Pin Code: 503306
- Vehicle registration: TS 17
- Website: telangana.gov.in

Bichkunda or Bichkonda is a Mandal in Kamareddy district of state of Telangana, India.

== Geography ==
Bichkunda is located at 18.4000°N 77.7167°E. It has an average elevation of 372 meters (1223 feet). Bichkunda is a municipality and mandal headquarters located in the district of Kamareddy, Telangana with over 25000 population. This town is known for its diversified culture due to its location neighbouring the borders of two states Maharashtra and Karnataka and as a result, although Telugu is the official language, Marati and Kannada are widely spoken.

Bichkunda serves as a centre for trade and medical facilities to the neighbouring villages with a newly refurbished Government hospital along with numerous private medical practitioners.
