= Ghanpur, Jangaon district =

Ghanpur
- revenue division
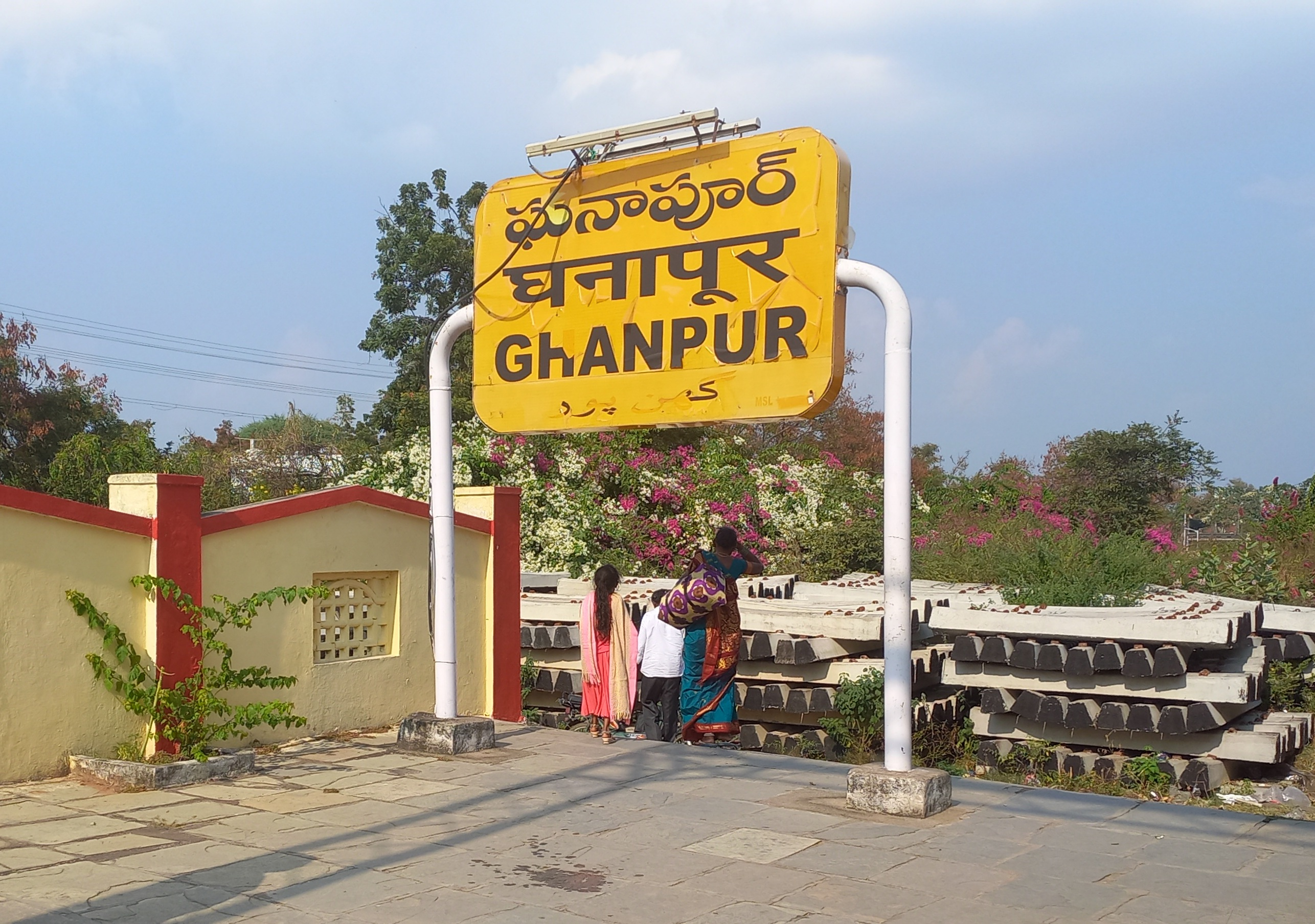
- Ghanpur railway station
- Nickname: Station Ghanpur
- Location in Telangana, India Ghanpur (India)
- Coordinates: 17.76856°N 79.48586°E
- Country: India
- State: Telangana
- District: Jangaon
- Talukas: Ghanpur (Station)

Area
  - Total: 20.24 km^{2} (7.81 sq mi)

Population (2013)
  - Total: 12,721
  - Density: 628.5/km^{2} (1,628/sq mi)

Languages
  - Official: Telugu, Urdu
- Time zone: UTC+5:30 (IST)
- PIN: 506143
- Telephone code: 08711
- Vehicle registration: TG 27
- Website: telangana.gov.in

Ghanpur is a Census town in Jangaon district of the Indian state of Telangana. It is located in Ghanpur mandal.
