= Jinnaram =

Town in Telangana, India

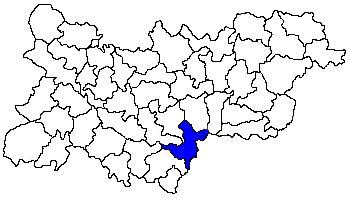
- Town in Telangana, India

- Location within Telangana Location within India
- Coordinates: 17°37′56″N 78°19′56″E
- Country: India
- State: Telangana
- District: Medak

Government
  - Type: People Government

Population (2021)
  - Total: 5,290

Languages
  - Official: Telugu
- Time zone: UTC+5:30 (IST)
- PIN: 502319
- Vehicle registration: TG 15
- Lok Sabha constituency: Medak Lok Sabha constituency
- Vidhan Sabha constituency: Patancheru Assembly constituency
- Website: telangana.gov.in

Jinnaram is a town and Mandal headquarters in Sangareddy district of Telangana, India.
