= Kothakota =

Kothakota Municipality
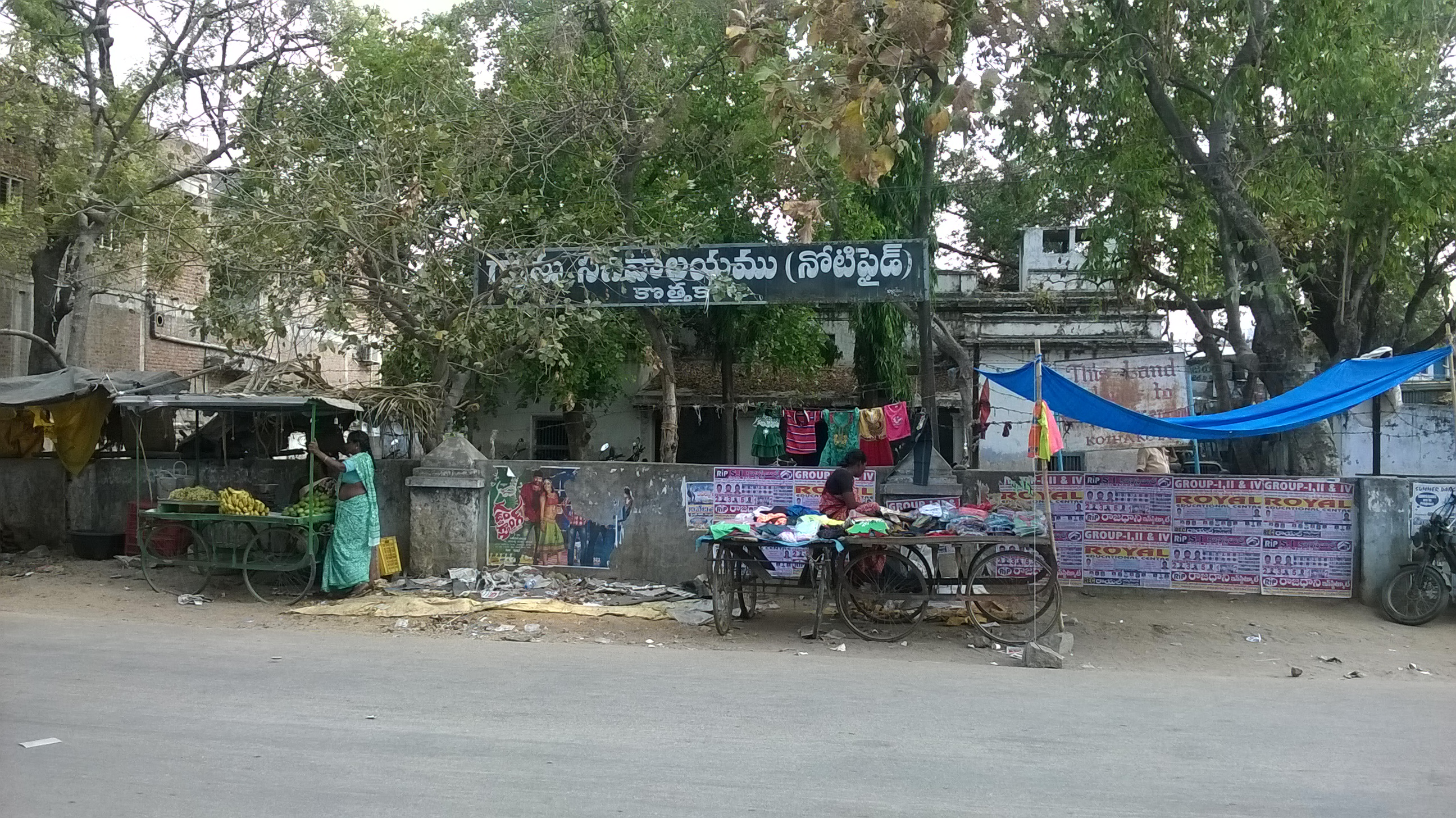
- Panchayat Office(old police station), Kothakota
- Nickname: Kothakota
- Kothakota (Telangana) Kothakota Municipality (India)
- Coordinates: 16.378700°N 77.941000°E
- Country: India
- State: Telangana
- District: Wanaparthy
- Elevation: 376 m (1,234 ft)
- Time zone: UTC+5:30 (IST)
- PIN: 509381
- Vehicle registration: TS32
- Nearest city: Wanaparthy
- Lok Sabha constituency: Mahabubnagar
- Vidhan Sabha constituency: Devarakadra
- Climate: hot (Köppen)
- Website: kothakotamunicipality.telangana.gov.in

Kothakota is a Municipality and mandal in Wanaparthy district, Telangana. newly formed Municipality in Wanaparthy District The average rainfall is 893 mm per Annum and minimum and maximum temperatures are 20˚c and 43˚c, respectively.

== Geography ==
Kothakota is located at 16.377589°N 77.939554°E. It has an average elevation of 401 metres (1318 ft).

== Demographics ==
As of 2011 Census of India, the Kothakota town has a population of 19,042.

== Administrative divisions ==
Kothakota is under the revenue division of Wanaparthy. Shaik Yasmeen Basha is the present collector of the Wanaparthy district. Alla Venkateswar Reddy is the legislative leader of Devarkadra constituency, Manne Srinivas Reddy is the Member of Mahbubnagar Lok Sabha constituency

== Tourist Places ==
- Lord Venkatagiri Temple
- Kanayapally Reservoir
- Sarala Sagar Dam
- Pamapuram Shiva temple
- Amadabakula Vekateshwara Swamy temple

== Transportation ==
It is located 135 km (84 mi) from the state capital Hyderabad. the nearest railway station is 6 km (3.7 mi) away from Madanapuram (Wanaparthy road) Railway station having Secunderabad-Dronachalam broad gauge railway line.

Road Transport available to Hyderabad, Kurnool, Thirupathi, Yadagirigutta, Srisailam, Mantralayam, Badrachalam and Mumbai.

National Highway 44 bypass road connected to Kothakota town
