= Kyathanpally =

- Municipality
- Location in Telangana, India Kyathanpally (India)
- Coordinates: 18.92337°N 79.458705°E
- Country: India
- State: Telangana
- District: Mancherial

Government
  - Type: Municipal council
  - Body: Kyathanpally Municipality

Area
  - Total: 6.50 km^{2} (2.51 sq mi)

Population (2011)
  - Total: 32,275
  - Rank: 55th(Telangana)
  - Density: 4,970/km^{2} (12,900/sq mi)

Languages
  - Official: Telugu
- Time zone: UTC+5:30 (IST)
- PIN: 504301
- Vehicle registration: TG 19
- Website: kyathanpallymunicipality.telangana.gov.in

Kyathanpally is a census town and a municipality in Mancherial district of the Indian state of Telangana.

== Demographics ==
As of 2001 India census,

Historical population
Year	Pop.	±%
1991	34,157	—
2001	42,273	+23.8%
2011	32,385	−23.4%

Kyathanpally had a population of 42,275. Males constitute 51% of population and females 49%. Kyathanpally has an average literacy rate of 59%, lower than the national average of 59.5%.Male literacy is 67% and female literacy is 51%. In Kyathanpally, 11% of the population is under 6 years of age.
