= Ieeja =

Ieeja Aiza, Ieej
- Town, Mandal headquarters
- Location in Telangana, India Ieeja (India)
- Coordinates: 16°00′51″N 77°40′13″E
- Country: India
- State: Telangana
- Region: Telangana
- District: Jogulamba Gadwal

Government
  - Body: Municipality

Area
  - Total: 4.97 km^{2} (1.92 sq mi)

Population (February 2019)
  - Total: 85,303
  - Density: 17,200/km^{2} (44,500/sq mi)
- Demonym: Resident of Ieeja

Languages
  - Official: Telugu
- Time zone: UTC+5:30 (IST)
- PIN: 509127
- Telephone code: 08546
- Vehicle registration: TS33
- Nearest city: Gadwal, Kurnool and Raichur
- Vidhan Sabha constituency: Alampur
- Climate: hot (Köppen)
- Website: telangana.gov.in

Ieeja (also spelled Aiza) is a town and headquarters of Ieeja Mandal located in Jogulamba Gadwal district in the state of Telangana. It comes under the Alampur assembly constituency, in the state of Telangana.

== List of villages under Ieeja Mandal ==
1. Uthanur
2. B.Timmapur
3. Eklaspur
4. Devabanda
5. Bingidoddi
6. Thoomukunta
7. Jadadoddi
8. Yapadinne
9. Venkatapur
10. Aiza
11. Medikonda
12. Thothinonidoddi
13. Sindhanoor
14. Kudakanoor
15. Pullikal
16. Kesavapuram
17. Venisampur
18. Chinna Tandrapadu
19. Uppala
20. Sankapuram
