= Atmakur, Wanaparthy =

Atmakur
- Town
- Location in Telangana, India Atmakur (India)
- Coordinates: 16.336389°N 77.805556°E
- Country: Atmakur India
- State: Telangana
- District: Wanaparthy

Government
  - Body: Municipality

Population
  - Total: 25,000

Languages
  - Official: Telugu
- Time zone: UTC+5:30 (IST)
- PIN: 509131
- Telephone code: 08504
- Vehicle registration: TS 32
- Nearest city: Gadwal
- Lok Sabha constituency: Mahabubnagar
- Vidhan Sabha constituency: Makthal
- Climate: Pleasant and calm (Köppen)
- Website: telangana.gov.in

Atmakur is a town, municipality, and Mandal headquarters located in Wanaparthy district in the Telangana state of India. Jurala Project is a dam on the Krishna River situated about 18 km from Atmakur. After the proposal of road extension work, Atmakur is rapidly developing.
