= Mudichintalapalle =

- Village
- Interactive map of Mudichintalapalle
- Coordinates: 17°39′07″N 78°41′20″E
- Country: India
- State: Telangana
- District: Medchal-Malkajgiri

Languages
  - Official: Telugu
- Time zone: UTC+5:30 (IST)
- Telephone code: 040
- Vehicle registration: AP-26 X XXXX
- Sex ratio: 1:1(approx) ♂/♀

Mudichintalapalle is a village in Medchal-Malkajgiri district in Telangana, India. It falls under Mudichintalapalle mandal.
