= Amarchinta =

Village & Mandal in Telangana, India

- Village & Mandal
- Location in Telangana, India Amarchinta (India)
- Coordinates: 16°22′26″N 77°46′26″E
- State: Telangana
- District: Wanaparthy

Government
  - Body: Panchayat

Languages
  - Official: Telugu
- Time zone: UTC+5:30 (IST)
- PIN: 509130
- Telephone code: 08504
- Vehicle registration: TG-32
- Nearest city: Atmakur
- Lok Sabha constituency: Mahabubnagar
- Vidhan Sabha constituency: Makthal
- Climate: Pleasant and calm (Köppen)
- Website: telangana.gov.in

Amarchinta is a municipality and Mandal headquarters located in Wanaparthy district in the Telangana state of India. Jurala Project is a dam on the Krishna River situated about 12 km from Amarchinta.

== Villages ==
The villages in Amarchinta mandal include:

1. Amarchintha
2. Mastipur
3. Pamireddipalle
4. Kankanvanipalle
5. Singampeta
6. Nandimalla
7. Chinthareddipalle
8. Mittanandimalla
9. Erladinne
10. Chandraghad
11. Dharmapur
12. Nagalkadumur
13. Kistampalle
