= Kallur, Khammam district =

Kalluru Kalluru
- Town
- Location in Telangana, India Kalluru (India)
- Coordinates: 17.2°N 80.55°E
- Country: India
- State: Telangana
- District: Khammam

Government
  - Type: local body
  - Body: localbody

Area
  - Total: 4 km^{2} (1.5 sq mi)
- Elevation: 104 m (341 ft)

Population (2001)
  - Total: 52,880
  - Density: 13,000/km^{2} (34,000/sq mi)

Languages
  - Official: Telugu
- Time zone: UTC+5:30 (IST)
- Postal code: 507209
- Vehicle registration: TS 04
- Website: telangana.gov.in

Kalluru is a Municipality and Mandal Headquarter in Khammam district in the state of Telangana.

== Geography ==
Kallur is located at 17.2°N 80.55°E. It has an average elevation of 104 metres (341 feet). Very near to Andhra Pradesh state capital Amaravathi, and vijayawada.it is near to Rajahmundry and Eluru towns in AP. Kallur is also border for ts and ap states .

== Demographics ==
As of 2001 India census, Kallur had a population of 55,880. Males constitute 51% of the population and females 49%. Kallur has an average literacy rate of 43%, lower than the national average of 59.5%: male literacy is 54%, and female literacy is 32%. In Kallur, 14% of the population is under 6 years of age.
