= Shadnagar =

- Town
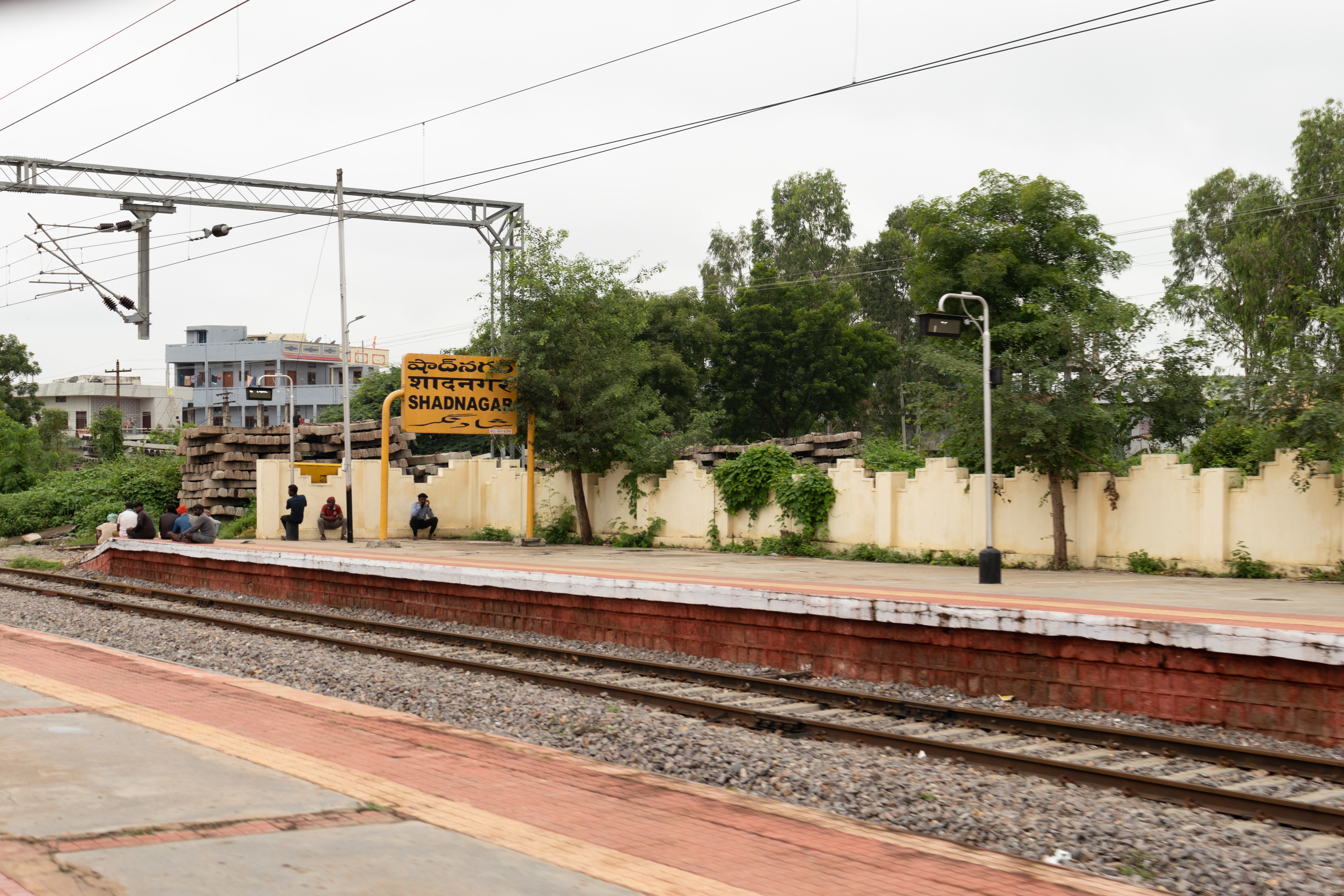
- Shadnagar Railway station

- Location in Telangana, India Shadnagar (India)
- Coordinates: 17.090917°N 78.218536°E
- Country: India
- State: Telangana
- District: Ranga Reddy

Government
  - Type: Democratic
  - MLA: K. Shankaraiah (Veerlapalli Shankar)

Area
  - Total: 5.16 km^{2} (1.99 sq mi)
- Elevation: 648 m (2,126 ft)

Population (2019)
  - Total: 50,545
  - Density: 9,800/km^{2} (25,400/sq mi)

Languages
  - Official: Telugu, Urdu.
- Time zone: UTC+5:30 (IST)
- PIN: 509216
- Telephone code: 91-08548
- Vehicle registration: TG 07

Shadnagar is a town and assembly constituency in the Ranga Reddy district in Telangana, India. As part of the reorganisation of districts in Telangana, Shadnagar separated from Mahabubnagar district and merged into Ranga Reddy district Headquarters.

Shadnagar is the site of the Indian Space Research Organisation National Remote Sensing Centre.

Bill Gates visited the community hospital for an immunization session and administered the polio vaccine to residents in 2002.

== History ==
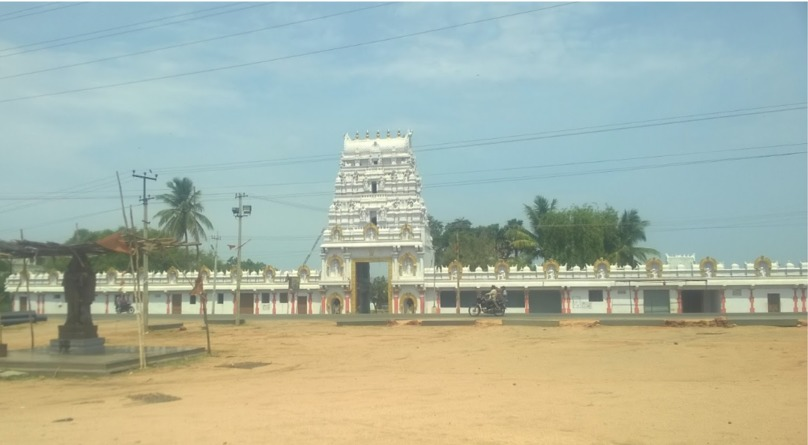
Venkateshwara Swami Temple Shadnagar

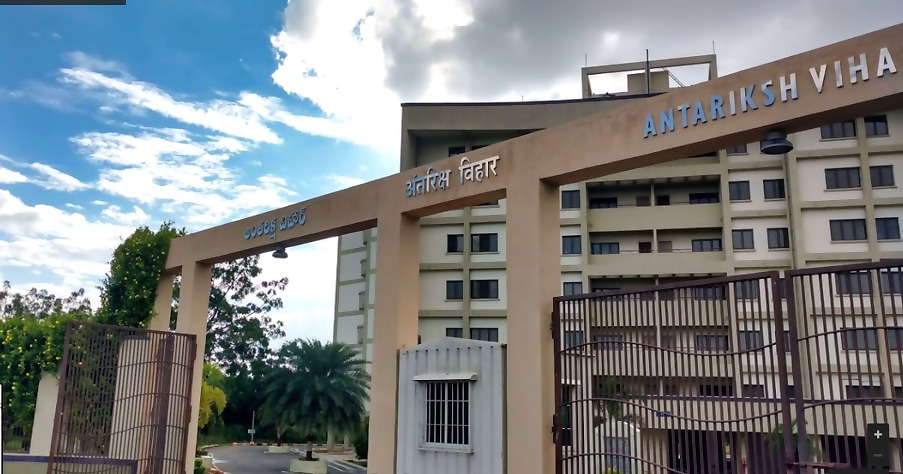
National Remoting Sensing Centre (ISRO) Shadnagar

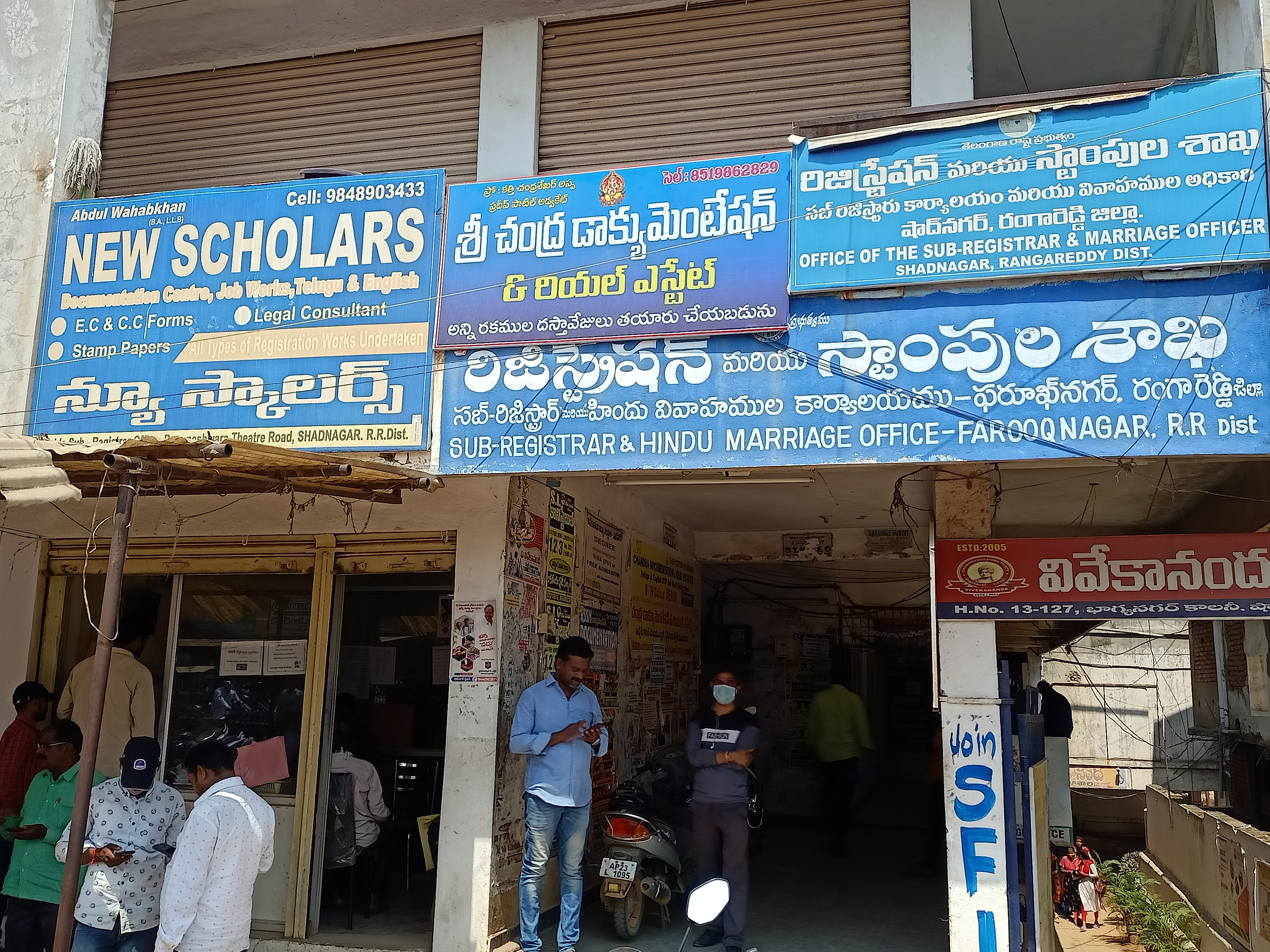
Sub Register office, Shadnagar

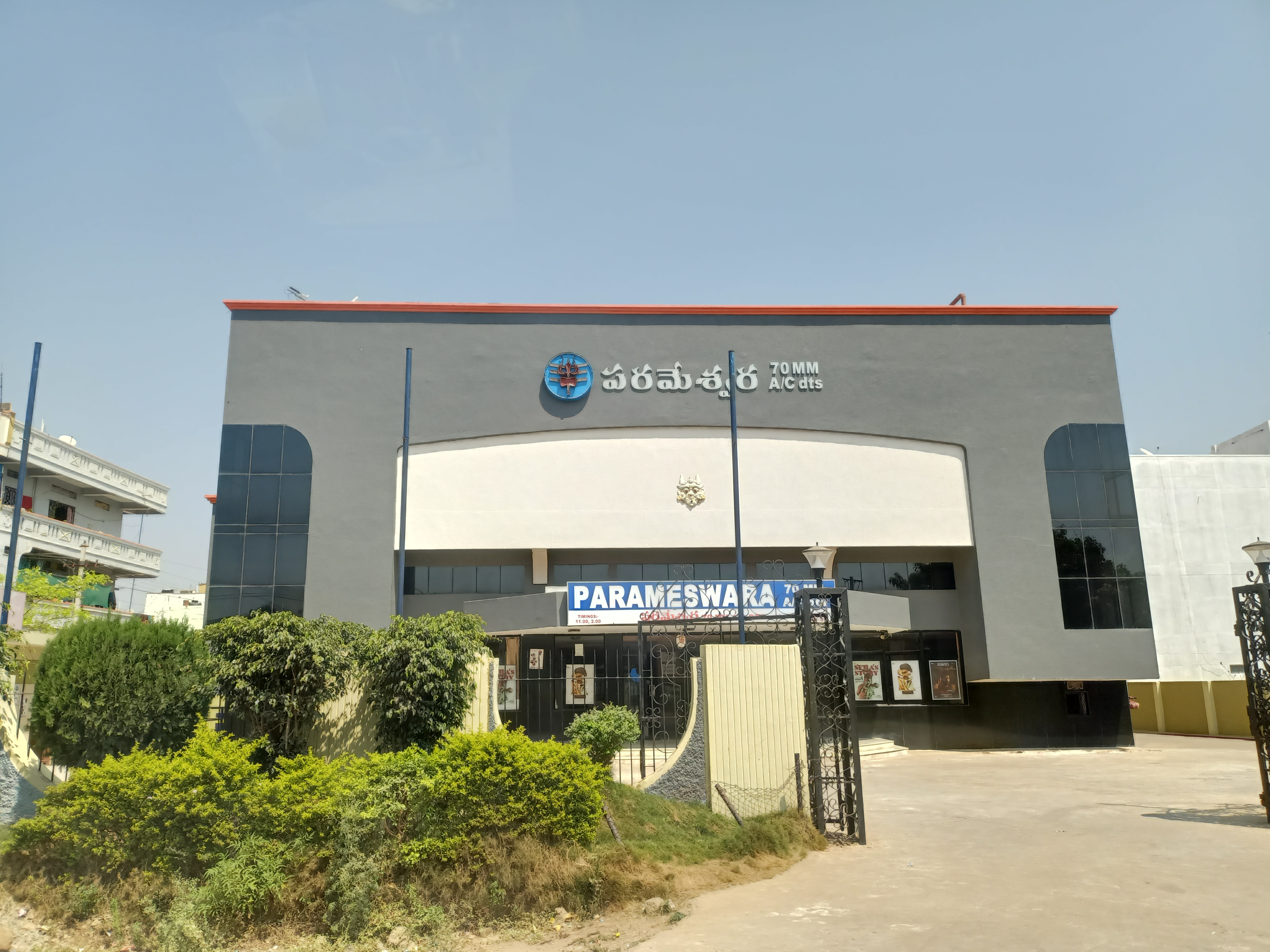
Parameshwara Theater in Shadnagar

Shadnagar was founded between 1869 and 1911 under the sixth Nizam - Mir Mahboob Ali Khan.

Shadnagar is a sister city of Farooq Nagar

== Municipality ==
Shadnagar town is constituted as Grade III Municipality in the year 24th August 2011, it is an ancient town During 1869–1911, under 6th Nizam Mahboob Ali Khan, Shadnagar was formed. Maharaja Krishnan Prasad, who belongs to Janampeta, was ruling under the 6th Nizam. He was famous among the peers maharaja, and known by his pen name 'Shad'. Based on the name 'Shad', Shadnagar was formed.

Burgula Ramakrishna Rao was the first elected Chief Minister of the erstwhile Hyderabad State and a great stalwart who led the struggle against the Nizam in the erstwhile princely State. He was born on March 13, 1899, in Padakallu village, Kalwakurthy taluk, Mahabubnagar district. His surname was "Pullamraju" and after some time he was known by his village name "Burgula". He was one of the founder members of the Hyderabad State Congress. He presided over the third Andhra Mahasabha conference at Devarakonda in 1913 and was responsible for creating an awakening among the people of Telangana for their rights, and promoting the library movement in the State.

The place is very well known for first formation of Panchayat Raj in Andhra Pradesh, Electronic voting machine, the first Chief Minister before Andhra Pradesh formation. The first Panchayat was formed in Shadnagar by Pandit Jawaharlal Nehru. It was formed on October 14, 1959. It was an auspicious day, as it was Vijay Dashami (Dusheera). The head of Panchayat was Appareddy, a Kothur candidate. After that it was taken ahead by Balanagar candidate Amar Reddy followed by Farooqnagar candidate Dhamodar Reddy.

The first electronic voting machine was tested in this place. It was in the realm of Andhra Pradesh hero NTR. He started Telugu Desham Party in 1982 and during 1983 assembly elections was held. It was for the first time in Andhra Pradesh, the electronic voting machine was introduced and it was tested in Shadnagar.

The place is located 650 m (2,130 ft) above sea level. The Ground Station Complex at Shadnagar, 55 km (34 mi) south of Hyderabad city, NRSA(C) is the prime centre to receive data from various Remote Sensing Satellites both Indian and Foreign origin. It is formed to get the geographical information through the satellites.

The inspection bungalow built by Nizam's in 1833 A.D. Microsoft chairman Bill Gates has visited this place and got a taste of Rural India. He administered oral polio vaccine to five children. He travelled to a health centre at Shadnagar to see the progress made during the first phase of a vaccine programme funded by the Bill and Melinda Gates Foundation. He spent nearly 40 minutes at the health centre as thousands of villagers gathered outside to catch a glimpse of the world's richest man.

During 1869–1911, under 6th Nizam Mahboob Ali Khan, Shadnagar was formed. Maharaja Krishnan Prasad, who belongs to Janampeta, was ruling under the 6th Nizam. Shadnagar has an average elevation of 431 m (1,414 ft).

As of 2011 India census, Shadnagar had a population of 54,431 (Male:27,713, Female:26,718). Males constitute 50.92% of the population and females 49.08%. Shadnagar has an average literacy rate of 58%, lower than the national average of 63.82%: male literacy is 67%, and female literacy is 49%. In Shadnagar 13% of the population is under 6 years of age.

Shadnagar Municipality is predominately covered by residential areas followed by commercial, public semi-public offices and Cinema Halls, T.S.R.T.C Bus Stand, Railway Station, Market yards and now growing with major industries.

== Schools ==
Popular Schools

1. Government (Kuntabadi) Boys High School
2. Montessori Group of Schools
3. Sri Saraswathi Shishu Mandir
4. Ravindra Bharati School
5. Oxford High School
6. Deepika Memorial High School
7. Mother Theresa school
8. St. Mary's (Geetanjali) High School
9. Brilliant Grammar High School
10. Shadnagar English Medium High School
11. Sathya Sai High School
12. Tagore High School
13. Medha International School
14. Delhi World School
15. Shastra International School
16. Heritage Valley
17. Indian Heights
18. The Masterminds International School
19. Narayana eTechno School
20. Chaitanya Techno School
21. International Delhi Public School (IDPS)
22. Krishnaveni talent school
23. Magnet school
24. Kakatiya school
25. Sri Chaitanya Techno School
26. Govt High School Farooq Nagar

== Higher Education ==
1. Govt Degree College
2. Noor College
3. Vivekananda
4. Moonray Institute Of Pharmaceutical Sciences
1. Sai Baba

== Government Offices ==
1. National Remote Sensing Centre /ISRO
2. District Divisional Court
3. Divisional Sub Treasury Office

== Industries & Housing Colonies ==
1. MSN
2. V Guard Batteries Company
3. NATCO
4. Aurobindo
5. CSK Villas Housing Colony
6. Sai Balaji Township
7. Bhagiratha Colony

== Hospitals ==
1. Government Hospitals
2. Bugga Reddy Super speciality
3. AVB Hospital
4. Abhishek Hospital
5. Viva Hospital
6. Raghu Children & General Hospital
7. LV Prasad Eye Institute, Kothur

== Housing Colonies ==
1. CSK
2. Sai Balaji
3. AB
4. Vijayanagar
