= Narayanpet =

Narayanpet GoldTown, Silk&Cotton Sarees Town
- City
- Narayanpet (Telangana)
- Coordinates: 16.744500°N 77.496000°E
- Country: India
- State: Telangana
- District: Narayanpet

Government
  - Type: Democratic
  - Body: Municipality

Area
  - Total: 4.86 km^{2} (1.88 sq mi)
- Elevation: 457 m (1,499 ft)

Population (2011)
  - Total: 41,752
  - Density: 8,590/km^{2} (22,300/sq mi)

Languages
  - Official: Telugu
- Time zone: UTC+5:30 (IST)
- PIN: 509210
- Telephone code: 91-08506
- Vehicle registration: TG-38
- Website: narayanpet.telangana.gov.in

Narayanpet is a town and district headquarters of Narayanpet district in the Indian state of Telangana. It is located 165 km from the state capital Hyderabad and 62 km from Mahabubnagar. Narayanpet is famous for its unique style of silk and cotton sarees, and the town has the largest market for sarees in Telangana after Gadwal and Pochampally. Narayanpet is also a hub for gold merchants.

== History ==
Narayanpet was a major economic town in the region during the 1900s. Business flourished during the Lokapally establishment. Major goods traded in Narayanpet were food grains, silk and cotton sarees, gold and silver ornaments, red bricks and black wool. Narayanpet was also a Suba (greater administrative district) in the Nizam period, and was the first municipality in the former Mahaboobnagar district. Despite being a major commercial town, development in Narayanpet was largely delayed due to administrative faults, political negligence and lack of interest from the leaders.

== Villages in the Narayanpet Mandal ==
1. Narayanpet
2. Bhairamkonda
3. Perapalla
4. Eklaspur
5. Kothapalle
6. Singar
7. Jajapur
8. Jalalpur
9. Appakapalle
10. Seranpalle
11. Chinnajatram
12. Ammireddipalle
13. Appireddipalle
14. Boinpalle
15. Anthwar
16. Ayyawaripalle
17. Kollampalle
18. Kotakonda
19. Narasappapalle
20. Abhangapur
21. Lingampalle (Kollampalle)
22. Thirumalapur
23. Bommanpad
24. Gurlapally
25. Kondareddypally
26. Kourampally

== Demographics ==
As of 2011 census, Narayanpet had a population of 41,752. The population constitutes 20,697 males and 21,055 females—a sex ratio of 1017 females per 1000 males. 4,997 children are in the age group of 0–6 years, of whom 2,642 are boys and 2,355 are girls. The average literacy rate stands at 72.18% with 26,531 literates, significantly higher than the state average of 55.04%.

== Governance ==
Narayanpet Municipality was constituted in 1937 and is classified as a 2nd grade municipality with 24 election wards.

== Transport ==
The nearest railway station is Saidapur Railway Station (formerly Narayanpet Road). A bus depot in the city connects Narayanpet to Hyderabad, Mahabubnagar, and other major towns and cities.

== Spiritual ==
Sri Sant Matt Moola Maha Samsthanam - Shakti Peetham (Goddess Laksmi Temple) is well known over all Narayanpet district,

manages by well known Spiritual Guru Dr.Swami Shantananda Purohit.

శక్తిపీఠంలో సీతారాముల కల్యణం,గణపతి నవరాత్రి ఉత్సవాలు, దేవీశరన్నవరాత్రి ఉత్సవాలు ప్రతియేట ఘనంగా జరుపుకుంటారు.
