= Amrabad Tiger Reserve =

Tiger reserve in Telangana, India

- IUCN category IV (habitat/species management area)
- Location within Telangana Location within India
- Interactive map of Amrabad Tiger Reserve
- Location: Nagarkurnool district, Nalgonda district, in Telangana, India
- Nearest city: Nagarkurnool
- Coordinates: 16.5957°N 78.8335°E
- Area: 2,611.39 km^{2} (1,008.26 sq mi)
- Established: 2015

Amrabad Tiger Reserve was established in 2015 as the 45th tiger reserve of India, located in the southern part of the Indian state of Telangana, covering a wide area of over 2611 km^{2} spanning the Nagarkurnool and Nalgonda districts.

== History ==
The Amrabad Tiger reserve existed as a sanctuary from 1983 when it was first notified. However, after the formation of Telangana state, Amrabad was declared a tiger reserve in 2015.

== Geography ==
The Amrabad Tiger reserve is one of the largest tiger reserves in India, covering a wide area of over 2611 km^{2}. It rests within the wider Nallamala Forest track, which it shares with the Nagarjunsagar-Srisailam Tiger Reserve, as a part of the Eastern Ghats chain.

It is the second-largest tiger reserve in terms of core area but the sixth-largest tiger reserve in terms of total area among all the 51 tiger reserves in India.

The tiger reserve lies in the three forest divisions: Amrabad and Achampet in Nagarkurnool district as well as Nagarjuna Sagar division in Nalgonda district. Major reservoirs like the Srisailam Dam and Nagarjuna Sagar Dam are fed by the river Krishna and its several perennial streams that originate from within the Amrabad Tiger Reserve.

== See also ==
- Project Tiger
- National Tiger Conservation Authority
- Wildlife Institute of India
