= Kalwakurthy Assembly constituency =

Constituency of the Telangana legislative assembly in India

Coordinates: 16.67°N 78.49°E

Kalwakurthy
- Constituency No. 83 for the Telangana Legislative Assembly
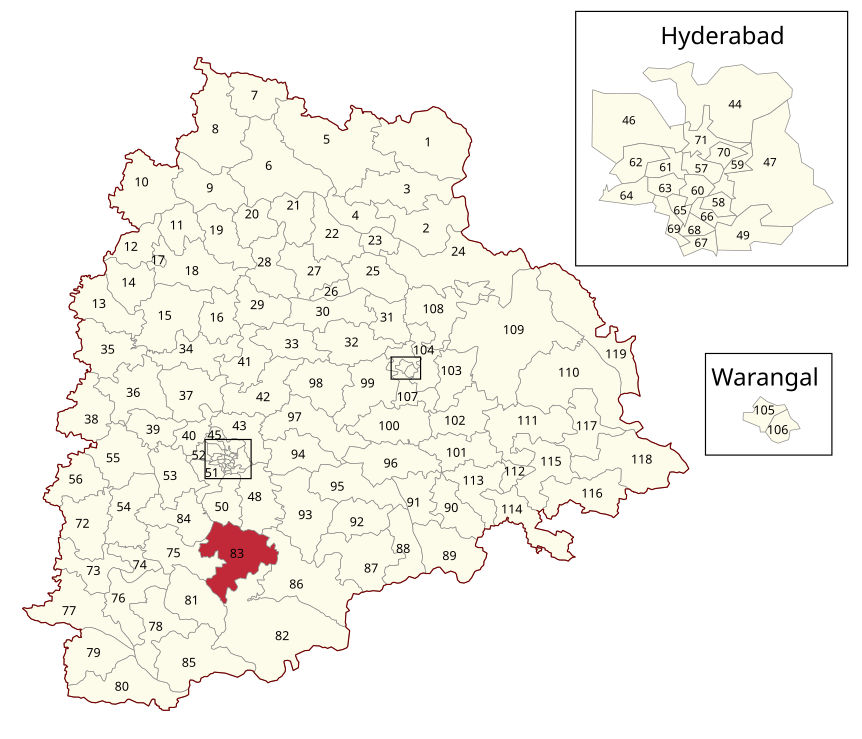
- Location of Kalwakurthy Assembly constituency within Telangana

Constituency details
- Country: India
- Region: South India
- State: Telangana
- District: Nagarkurnool
- Lok Sabha constituency: Nagarkurnool
- Established: 1951
- Total electors: 1,99,363
- Reservation: None

Member of Legislative Assembly
- 3rd Telangana Legislative Assembly
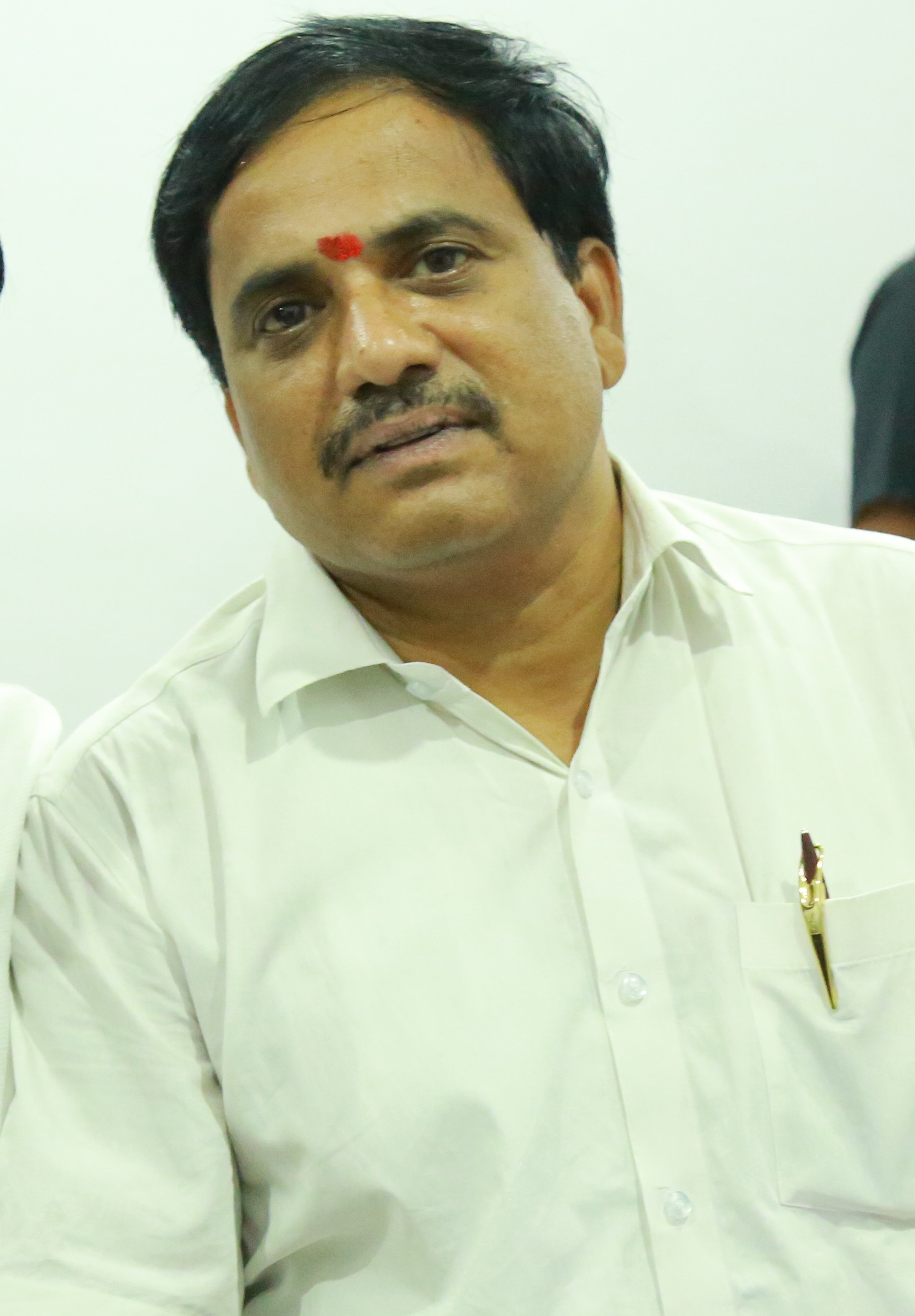
- Incumbent Kasireddy Narayan Reddy
- Party: Indian National Congress
- Elected year: 2023

Kalwakurthy Assembly constituency is a constituency of Telangana Legislative Assembly, India. It is one of four constituencies in Nagarkurnool district and one of the eight constituencies in Ranga Reddy district. It is part of Nagarkurnool Lok Sabha constituency.

Kasireddy Narayan Reddy of Indian National Congress won the seat with majority of 5,410 in the 2023 Assembly election.

NT Rama Rao, founder of the Telugu Desam Party, lost from this constituency when he was defeated by Chittaranjan Das of Congress in 1989 elections.

== Mandals ==
The Assembly Constituency presently comprises the following mandals:

Mandal	District
Kalwakurthy	Nagarkurnool
Veldanda	Nagarkurnool
Talakondapalle	Rangareddy
Amangal	Rangareddy
Madgul	Rangareddy
Kadthal	Rangareddy

== Members of Legislative Assembly ==
Year of election	MLA	Political party
Hyderabad State
1952	M. Narsing Rao	Indian National Congress
1952	K.R. Veeraswamy	Indian National Congress
Andhra Pradesh
1957	Shanta Bai Talpallikar	Indian National Congress
1962	Venkat Reddy	Independent
1964	Shanta Bai Talpallikar	Indian National Congress
1967	G. Reddy	Independent
1969	Jaipal Reddy	Indian National Congress
1972	Jaipal Reddy	Indian National Congress
1978	Jaipal Reddy	Janata Party
1983	Jaipal Reddy	Janata Party
1985	J. Chittaranjan Das	Indian National Congress
1989	J. Chittaranjan Das	Indian National Congress
1994	Yadma Kista Reddy	Independent
1999	Gurka Jaipal Yadav	Telugu Desam Party
2004	Yadma Kista Reddy	Indian National Congress
2009	Gurka Jaipal Yadav	Telugu Desam Party
Telangana
2014	Challa Vamshichand Reddy	Indian National Congress
2018	Gurka Jaipal Yadav	Bharat Rashtra Samithi
2023	Kasireddy Narayan Reddy	Indian National Congress

== Election results ==
=== Assembly Election 2023 ===
2023 Telangana Legislative Assembly election : Kalwakurthy
Party	Candidate	Votes	%	±%
INC	Kasireddy Narayan Reddy	75,858	37.41%	▲11.26
BJP	Thalloju Achari	70,448	34.75%	▲1.34
BRS	Gurka Jaipal Yadav	42,847	21.13%	▼14.22
BSP	Komma Srinivasulu	2,667	1.32%	▼0.09
Alliance of Democratic Reforms Party	Adula Srinu	1,941	0.96%	New
NOTA	None of the above	661	0.33%	▼0.43
Margin of victory		5,410	2.66%	▲0.72
Turnout		202,773	74.50%	▼12.71
Total valid votes		202,773		
INC gain from BRS		Swing	▲11.26	

=== Assembly Election 2018 ===
2018 Telangana Legislative Assembly election : Kalwakurthy
Party	Candidate	Votes	%	±%
TRS	Gurka Jaipal Yadav	62,892	35.35%	▲16.90
BJP	Thalloju Achari	59,445	33.41%	▲7.02
INC	Challa Vamshi Chand Reddy	46,523	26.15%	▼0.29
BSP	Gangaram Sai Baba	2,500	1.41%	New
NOTA	None of the above	1,359	0.76%	New
Margin of victory		3,447	1.94%	▲1.86
Turnout		177,914	87.21%	▲6.19
Total valid votes		177,914		
TRS gain from INC		Swing	▲16.90	

=== Assembly Election 2014 ===
2014 Telangana Legislative Assembly election : Kalwakurthy
Party	Candidate	Votes	%	±%
INC	Challa Vamshichand Reddy	42,782	26.44%	▼9.69
BJP	Thalloju Achari	42,704	26.39%	▲10.93
TRS	Gurka Jaipal Yadav	29,844	18.45%	New
Independent	Kasireddy Narayan Reddy	24,095	14.89%	New
YSRCP	Yadma Kista Reddy	13,818	8.54%	New
Margin of victory		78	0.08%	▼6.43
Turnout		161,799	81.02%	▲7.03
Total valid votes		161,799		
INC gain from TDP		Swing	▼9.69	

=== Assembly Election 2009 ===
2009 Andhra Pradesh Legislative Assembly election : Kalwakurthy
Party	Candidate	Votes	%	±%
TDP	G. Jaipal Yadav	56,990	36.52%	New
INC	Yadma Kista Reddy	56,393	36.13%	New
BJP	Thalloju Achari	24,125	15.46%	New
PRP	J. Chitharanjandas	7,881	5.05%	New
Pyramid Party of India	Guduru Prabhakar Reddy	3,407	2.18%	New
Margin of victory		597	0.39%	New
Turnout		156,071	73.99%	New
Total valid votes		156,071		
TDP win		Swing	New	

=== Assembly Election 2004 ===
2004 Andhra Pradesh Legislative Assembly election : Kalwakurthy
Party	Candidate	Votes	%	±%
INC	Yadma Kista Reddy	59,514	44.20%	▲3.37
BJP	Achary Talloju	51,525	38.27%	▲6.10
Independent	T. Raghunandan Reddy	15,316	11.37%	New
BSP	Kotha Ramulu	4,496	3.34%	New
Independent	Kurva Satyanarayana	2,569	1.91%	New
Margin of victory		7,989	5.93%	▼2.73
Turnout		134,657	69.17%	▲4.67
Total valid votes		134,657		
INC gain from BJP		Swing	▲3.37	

=== Assembly Election 1999 ===
1999 Andhra Pradesh Legislative Assembly election : Kalwakurthy
Party	Candidate	Votes	%	±%
TDP	Gurka Jaipal Yadav	30,341	24.40%	▼14.36
INC	Yadma Kista Reddy	50,774	40.83%	▼4.07
BJP	Achary Talloju	39,997	32.17%	▲19.57
Anna Telugu Desam Party	D. Krishnaiah	1,845	1.48%	New
Margin of victory		10,777	8.66%	▼1.38
Turnout		124,357	64.50%	▼5.50
Total valid votes		124,357		
TDP gain from INC		Swing	▲3.37	

=== Assembly Election 1994 ===
1994 Andhra Pradesh Legislative Assembly election : Kalwakurthy
Party	Candidate	Votes	%	±%
Independent	Yadma Kista Reddy	52,192	44.90%	▲7.67
TDP	Jagannadham	44,834	38.76%	▼8.55
BJP	Achary Talloju	14,582	12.60%	▲8.29
Independent	M. Krishnaiah	1,489	1.29%	New
Margin of victory		7,358	6.14%	▼1.60
Turnout		115,670	70.00%	▲1.63
Total valid votes		115,670		
Independent gain from TDP		Swing	▲7.67	

=== Assembly Election 1989 ===
1989 Andhra Pradesh Legislative Assembly election : Kalwakurthy
Party	Candidate	Votes	%	±%
INC	J. Chittaranjan Das	54,354	50.94%	▲3.35
TDP	N. T. Rama Rao	50,786	47.59%	New
Independent	T. Raghunandan Reddy	10,724	10.22%	New
BJP	Achary Talloju	4,520	4.31%	New
Margin of victory		3,568	3.35%	New
Turnout		106,700	68.37%	▲4.67
Total valid votes		106,700		
INC gain from TDP		Swing	▲3.35	

=== Assembly Election 1985 ===
1985 Andhra Pradesh Legislative Assembly election : Kalwakurthy
Party	Candidate	Votes	%	±%
INC	J. Chittaranjan Das	47,842	49.00%	▲1.64
TDP	D. Venkat Reddy	38,103	39.00%	▼10.00
Margin of victory		9,739	10.00%	▲11.64
Turnout		97,580	63.70%	▼1.30
Total valid votes		97,580		
INC gain from JP		Swing	▲1.64	

=== Assembly Election 1983 ===
1983 Andhra Pradesh Legislative Assembly election : Kalwakurthy
Party	Candidate	Votes	%	±%
JP	S. Jaipal Reddy	44,520	47.36%	▼2.64
INC	R. M. Manohar	46,012	49.00%	▲2.00
Margin of victory		1,492	1.64%	▼4.64
Turnout		93,900	65.00%	▲3.00
Total valid votes		93,900		
INC gain from JP		Swing	▼2.64	

=== Assembly Election 1978 ===
1978 Andhra Pradesh Legislative Assembly election : Kalwakurthy
Party	Candidate	Votes	%	±%
JP	S. Jaipal Reddy	42,100	50.00%	New
INC(I)	Gangadhar Reddy	37,000	44.00%	New
Margin of victory		5,100	6.00%	New
Turnout		84,200	62.00%	New
Total valid votes		84,200		
JP gain from		Swing	New	
