= Mamidala Yashaswini Reddy =

Indian politician

Member of the Telangana Legislative Assembly
- Incumbent
- Assumed office 3 December 2023
- Preceded by: Errabelli Dayakar Rao
- Constituency: Palakurthi

Personal details
- Born: 3 February 1997 (age 29) Dindi Chintapally, Vangoor Mandal, Nagarkurnool District, Telangana, India
- Party: Indian National Congress
- Spouse: H. Raja Ram Mohan Reddy
- Children: 1

Mamidala Yashaswini Reddy is an Indian politician from the state of Telangana. She is the second youngest MLA of the Telangana Legislative Assembly. She is elected to the 2023 Telangana Legislative Assembly election from the Palakurthi Assembly constituency representing Indian National Congress.

== Early life ==
Reddy's Parents are from Vangoor Mandal of Nagarkurnool district near Kalwakurthy. She has done her schooling in Hyderabad and completed her graduation from Sreyas Institute of Engineering and Technology, Nagole.

== Career ==
Reddy entered politics with the Indian National Congress party by successfully contesting the 2023 Telangana Legislative Assembly election from Palakurthi against political veteran Errabelli Dayakar Rao. She is the second youngest legislator in the state at the age of 26 years.
