= Nagarkurnool Assembly constituency =

Constituency of the Telangana legislative assembly in India

Coordinates: 16.49°N 78.31°E

Nagarkurnool
- Constituency No. 81 for the Telangana Legislative Assembly
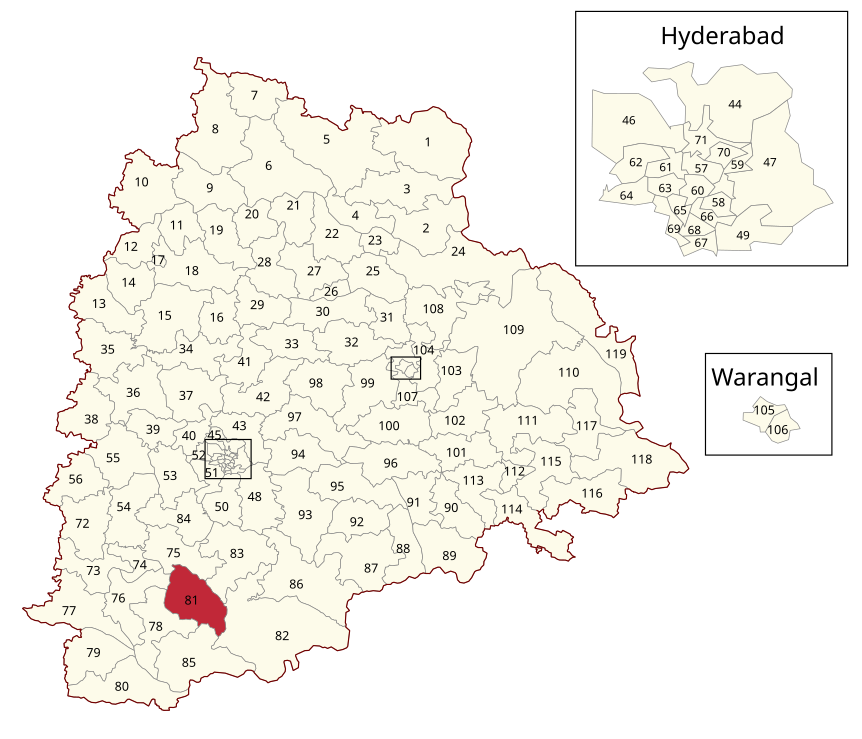
- Location of Nagarkurnool Assembly constituency within Telangana

Constituency details
- Country: India
- Region: South India
- State: Telangana
- District: Nagarkurnool
- Lok Sabha constituency: Nagarkurnool
- Established: 1951
- Total electors: 211,288
- Reservation: None

Member of Legislative Assembly
- 3rd Telangana Legislative Assembly
- Incumbent Kuchkulla Rajesh Reddy
- Party: Indian National Congress
- Elected year: 2023

Nagarkurnool Assembly constituency is a constituency of Telangana Legislative Assembly, India. It is one of four constituencies in Nagarkurnool district. It is part of Nagarkurnool Lok Sabha constituency.

Kuchkulla Rajesh Reddy of Indian National Congress won the seat in 2023 Telangana Legislative Assembly election.

== Mandals ==
The Assembly Constituency presently comprises the following Mandals:

Mandal
Nagarkurnool
Bijinapalle
Tadoor
Telkapally
Thimmajipet

== Members of Legislative Assembly ==
Year of election	MLA	Political party
Hyderabad State
1952	B. Brahma Reddy	Independent
1952	D. Ramaswamy	Independent
Andhra Pradesh
1957	Janardhan Reddy	Indian National Congress
1962	P. Mahendranath	Indian National Congress
1967	Vanga Narayan Goud	Independent
1972	Vanga Narayan Goud	Indian National Congress
1978	Srinivasa Rao	Indian National Congress
1983	Vanga Narayan Goud	Indian National Congress
1985	Nagam Janardhan Reddy	Telugu Desam Party
1989	Vanga Narayan Goud	Indian National Congress
1994	Nagam Janardhan Reddy	Telugu Desam Party
1999	Nagam Janardhan Reddy	Telugu Desam Party
2004	Nagam Janardhan Reddy	Telugu Desam Party
2009	Nagam Janardhan Reddy	Telugu Desam Party
2012^	Nagam Janardhan Reddy	Independent
Telangana
2014	Marri Janardhan Reddy	Telangana Rashtra Samithi
2018	Marri Janardhan Reddy	Telangana Rashtra Samithi
2023	Dr. Kuchkulla Rajesh Reddy	Indian National Congress

^by-election

== Election results ==
=== Telangana Legislative Assembly election, 2023 ===
2023 Telangana Legislative Assembly election: Nagarkurnool Assembly constituency
Party	Candidate	Votes	%	±%
INC	Dr. Kuchkulla Rajesh Reddy	87,161	47.21	
BRS	Marri Janardhan Reddy	81,913	44.37	
JSP	Vanga Lakshman Goud	1,955	1.06	
NOTA	None of the Above	1,122	0.61	
Majority		5,248	2.84	
Turnout		1,84,616		
INC gain from TRS		Swing		

=== 2018 ===
2018 Telangana Legislative Assembly election: Nagarkurnool
Party	Candidate	Votes	%	±%
TRS	Marri Janardhan Reddy	102,493	60.80	
INC	Nagam Janardhan Reddy	48,139	28.56	
BJP	Dileep Neddanori	3,923	2.33	
NOTA	None of the Above	923	0.55	
Majority		54,354		
Turnout		1,68,581	83.21	
TRS hold		Swing		

=== Telangana Legislative Assembly election, 2014 ===
Telangana Assembly Elections, 2014: Nagarkurnool (Assembly constituency)
Party	Candidate	Votes	%	±%
TRS	Marri Janardhan Reddy	62,470	41.34%	
INC	Kuchakulla Damodar Reddy	48,035	31.79%	
BJP	Dr. Nagam Shashidhar Reddy	27,789	18.39%	
Majority		14,435		
Turnout		1,51,117	76.07%	
TRS gain from BJP		Swing		

== See also ==
- List of constituencies of Telangana Legislative Assembly
