= Marri Janardhan Reddy =

Indian politician (born 1973)

Reddy in 2015.

Marri Janardhan Reddy (born 29 March 1973) is an Indian politician from Telangana. He is a former two time Member of the Legislative Assembly from Nagarkurnool Assembly constituency representing the Telangana Rashtra Samithi Party.

Reddy is from Nerellapalli village, Thimmajipet mandal, Nagarkurnool district, Telangana. He is the son of Marri Janga Reddy. He did his schooling at Zilla Parishad High School, Badepally, Mahabubnagar district and passed Class 10 in 1987. He runs his own business.

Reddy first became an MLA winning the 2014 Andhra Pradesh Legislative Assembly election from Nagarkurnool Assembly constituency representing the Telangana Rashtra Samithi Party. He polled 62,470 votes and defeated his nearest rival, Kuchakulla Damodar Reddy of the Indian National Congress, by a margin of 14,435 votes. He retained the seat for TRS in the new Telangana state winning the 2018 Telangana Legislative Assembly election polling 1,02,493 votes to defeat Nagam Janardhana Reddy by a margin of 54,354 votes. In the 2023 Assembly election, he lost to Kuchkulla Rajesh Reddy, of the Indian National Congress.
