= Wattipally =

Wattipally Vattipally
- Village
- Location in Andhra Pradesh, India Wattipally (India)
- Coordinates: 16.19°N 78.25°E
- Country: India
- State: Telangana
- Region: Telangana
- District: Nagarkurnool

Area
  - Total: 16 km^{2} (6.2 sq mi)
- Elevation: 498 m (1,634 ft)

Population (2001)
  - Total: 2,300
  - Density: 250/km^{2} (650/sq mi)

Languages
  - Official: Telugu, Hindi
- Time zone: UTC+5:30 (IST)
- PIN: 509412
- Telephone code: 91 8540
- Coastline: 0 kilometres (0 mi)
- Sex ratio: 0.95 ♂/♀
- Climate: Semi-arid (Köppen)
- Precipitation: 803 millimetres (31.6 in)
- Avg. annual temperature: 35.0 °C (95.0 °F)
- Avg. summer temperature: 40.9 °C (105.6 °F)
- Avg. winter temperature: 25.0 °C (77.0 °F)

Wattipally is a remote village in Telkapalle mandal, Nagar Kurnool Revenue division of Nagarkurnool district, Andhra Pradesh, India.
