= Bekkara =

Bekkara, also known as Bekkera, is a small village in Telangana, India. It is located in the Kalwakurthy mandal of Nagarkurnool district.

== Demographics ==
Telugu is the local Language here. The total population of Bekkara is around 500 are living in 120 Houses. Total area of Bekkara is around 350 hectares.
