= Aishwarya Ganapathi =

Biggest statue of deity Ganesha

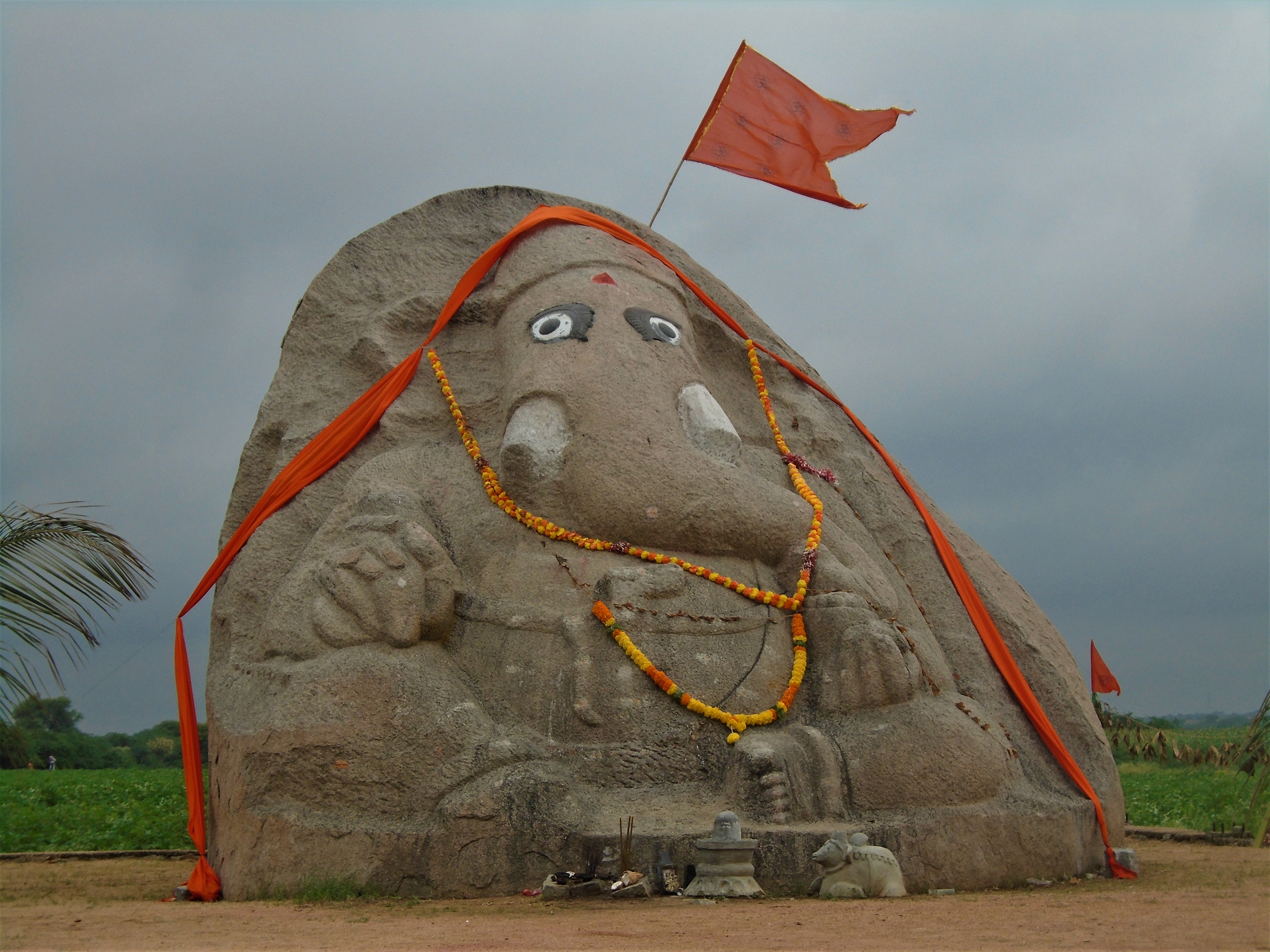
- Avancha Ganapathi

- Aishwarya Ganapathi

Religion
- Affiliation: Hinduism
- District: Nagarkurnool
- Deity: Ganesha

Location
- Location: Avancha, Thimmajipeta
- State: Telangana
- Coordinates: 16.7129°N 78.253191°E

Architecture
- Creator: Western Chalukya Empire
- Elevation: 9.144 m (30 ft)

Website
- telangana.gov.in

The Aishwarya Ganapathi or Monolith Ganesh is located at Avancha, Thimmajipeta, Nagarkurnool in the Indian state of Telangana. The statue of the Hindu deity Ganesha, belongs to the Western Chalukya Empire. The statue is 7.62 meters tall – 9.144 meters including pedestal.

== History ==
Ancient Ganesha idol sculpted on a big granite boulder is lying in Avancha, Thimmajipet, Telangana in the 12th century by a king of the Western Chalukya dynasty, the idol is located in agricultural field.

Kapilavai Linga Moorthy, the monolithic idol was sculpted by king Thylapudu, ruled Avancha as its capital. King Vikramaditya of Badami kingdom, present of Gulbarga district, belonged to western Chalukya dynasty.

The dynasty ruled Telangana region for over 200 years. Vikramaditya sons Someshwarudu and Thylapudu. Thylapudu was made Samanta Raju to a particular province of erstwhile Kandoor as its capital. Thylapudu shifted his capital to Avancha in 1113 AD.
