= Kasireddy Narayan Reddy =

Indian politician (born 1964)

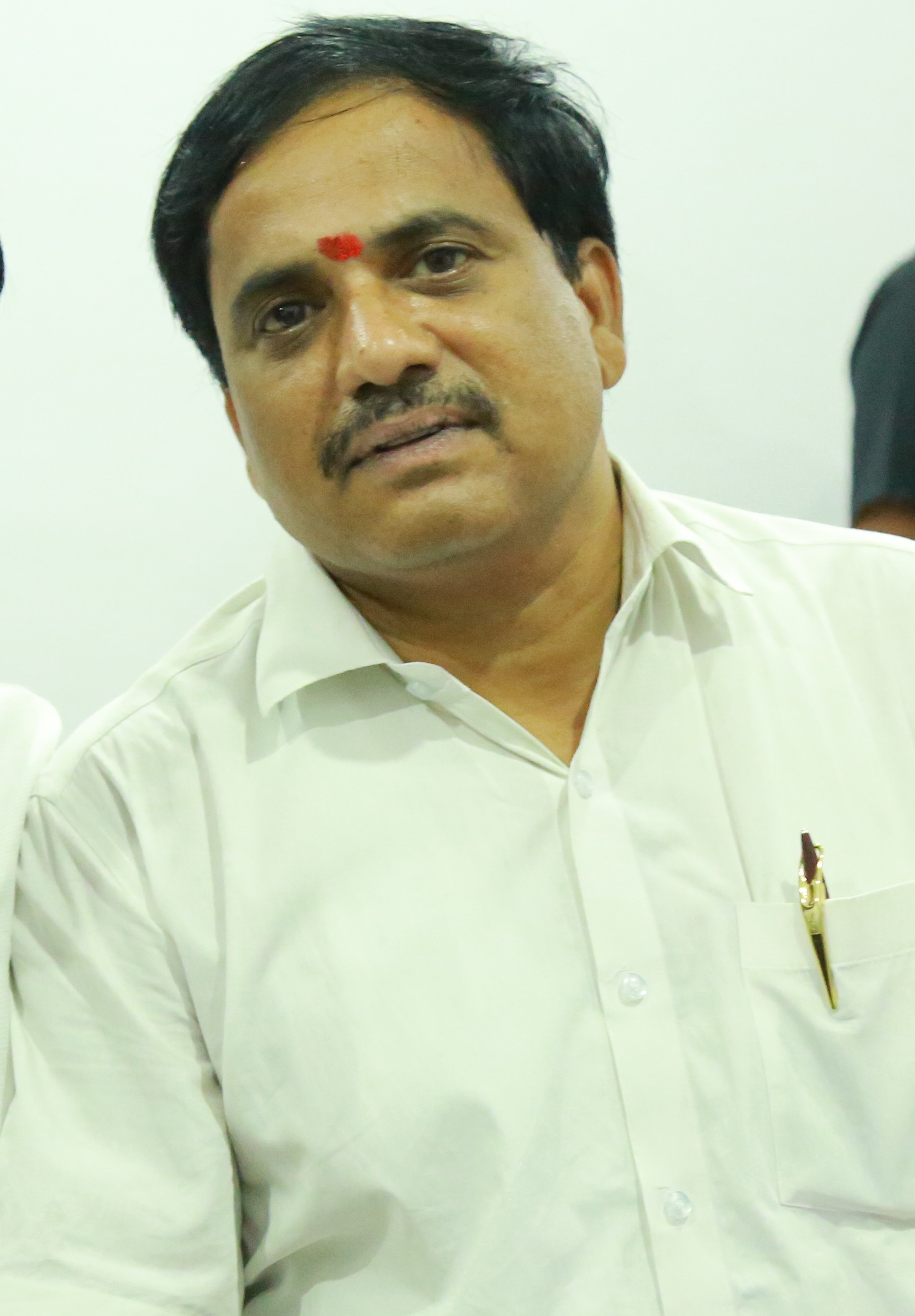
Kasireddy Narayanreddy

Kasireddy Narayan Reddy (born 1964) is an Indian politician from Telangana state. He is an MLA from Kalwakurthy Assembly constituency in Nagarkurnool district. He represents Indian National Congress and won the 2023 Telangana Legislative Assembly election.

== Early life and education ==
Reddy is from Kalwakurthy, Ranga Reddy district. His late father Durga Reddy is from an agricultural family. He completed his Master of Technology in Mechanical Engineering at Vinayaka Missions University.

== Career ==
Reddy won from Kalwakurthy Assembly constituency representing Indian National Congress in the 2023 Telangana Legislative Assembly election. He polled 75,858 votes and defeated his nearest rival, Talloju Achary of Bharatiya Janata Party, by a narrow margin of 5,410 votes.
