= Urkondapeta =

Urukondapeta Urkondapet
- Revenue Village
- Country: India
- State: Telangana
- District: Nagarkurnool
- Mandal: Urkonda

Population (2011)
  - Total: 2,655
- PIN CODE: 509320
- S.T.D Code: 08549

Urukondapeta is a village located nearby Kalwakurthy. It belongs to Urkonda mandal, Jadcherla (Assembly constituency) in Nagarkurnool district of Telangana, India. This is located 12 kilometers from Kalwakurthy. It has approximately 2600 population. It is a big village compared to surrounding villages.

In this village lot of general stores are there and available all items without any fail.

== Places of interest ==
In this village, there is a temple called Sri Abhayaanjaneya Swamy Temple.

Every Saturday, many pilgrims visit this temple from surrounding areas.

In the months of January or February, there are fairs in the village.

== Devaalayam (Sri Abhayaanjaneya Swamy Temple) ==
Every Saturday, pilgrims visit this temple. People have their Annual Celebrations every year in this temple called JATHARA.

== Transportation ==
It has two routes from Kalwakurthy:

1. From Kalwakurthy Bus stand Bus names called Gatippalapaly/Talakondapally will go via Urkondapeta or can get Direct Auto's from Kalwakurthy Bus stand.

Bus Timing

        Ukpt-klky.  6:00AM.       
        Klky-ukpt.  6:30AM.      

Next.

        Klky-ukpt.  8:30AM.     
        Ukpt-klky.  11:00AM.      

Next.

        Klky-ukpt.  2:00PM.      
        Ukpt-klky.  4:30PM.       
        Klky-ukpt.  5:20PM.       
        UKPT-KLKY.  6:30PM.       

LAST BUS.

        KLKY-UKPT.  7:20PM.      

DAILY SAME TIMINGS.

2. From Hyderabad IS Sadan Bus stop early morning in between 9:00 to 9:30 AM, 1:00 PM to 1:30 PM and 6:00 PM to 7:00 PM we have buses to Urukondapeta Hanuman Temple and the same buses will return to Hyderabad.

3. From Amangal we have buses to we have buses to Urukondapeta Hanuman Temple.
