= Nandi Awards of 1964 =

Annual Awards presented by Government of Andhra Pradesh

Nandi Awards is presented annually by the Government of Andhra Pradesh. It was first awarded in 1964.

== 1964 Nandi Awards Winners List ==
Category	Winner	Film
Best Feature Film	D. Madhusudhana Rao	Doctor Chakravarthy
Second Best Feature Film	Gangaram	Keelu Bommalu
Third Best Feature Film	V.Madhusudhan rao	Gudigantalu
