= Kuchkulla Rajesh Reddy =

Indian politician (born 1973)

- Reddy in 2023

Member of Legislative Assembly
- Incumbent
- Assumed office 12 December 2023
- Preceded by: Marri Janardhan Reddy
- Constituency: Nagarkurnool

Kuchkulla Rajesh Reddy (born 1973) is an Indian politician from Telangana state. He is an MLA from Nagarkurnool Assembly constituency in Nagarkurnool district. He represents Indian National Congress and won the 2023 Telangana Legislative Assembly election.

== Early life and education ==
Reddy was born in Nagarkurnool, Telangana, to Kuchkulla Damodar Reddy and Kuchkulla Bhagya Reddy. He completed his Master of Dental Surgery at Bapuji Dental College, Rajiv Gandhi University of Health Sciences, Karnataka. In 2005, he joined Sri Sai Dental College in Vikarabad as a professor and also practiced dentistry in Hyderabad.

Reddy is married to Baddam Saritha Reddy, daughter of Baddam Narsa Reddy. The couple has two sons.

== Political Career ==
Reddy won from Nagarkurnool Assembly constituency representing Indian National Congress in the 2023 Telangana Legislative Assembly election. He polled votes and defeated his nearest rival, Marri Janardhan Reddy of Bharat Rashtra Samithi, by a margin of 5,248 votes.

Reddy's father, Kuchkulla Damodar Reddy, was also active in politics and had contested elections to the Legislative Assembly on five occasions. Damodar Reddy was unsuccessful in his attempts to become a Member of the Legislative Assembly. Rajesh Reddy's election from Nagarkurnool in 2023 consequently marked the first time his father's family secured the Assembly seat.
