= Kanmanoor =

- village
- Location in Telangana, India Kanmanoor (India)
- Coordinates: 16.482181°N 77.899747°E
- Country: India
- State: Telangana
- District: Mahbubnagar

Languages
  - Official: Telugu
- Time zone: UTC+5:30 (IST)
- PIN: 509381
- Telephone code: 08545
- Vehicle registration: TS-06
- Nearest city: Kothakota
- Lok Sabha constituency: Nagarkurnool
- Assembly constituency: Wanaparthy

Kanmanoor is a village in Addakal Mandal, Mahbubnagar district, Telangana State.
