= Umamaheshwaram =

Temple in Telangana, India

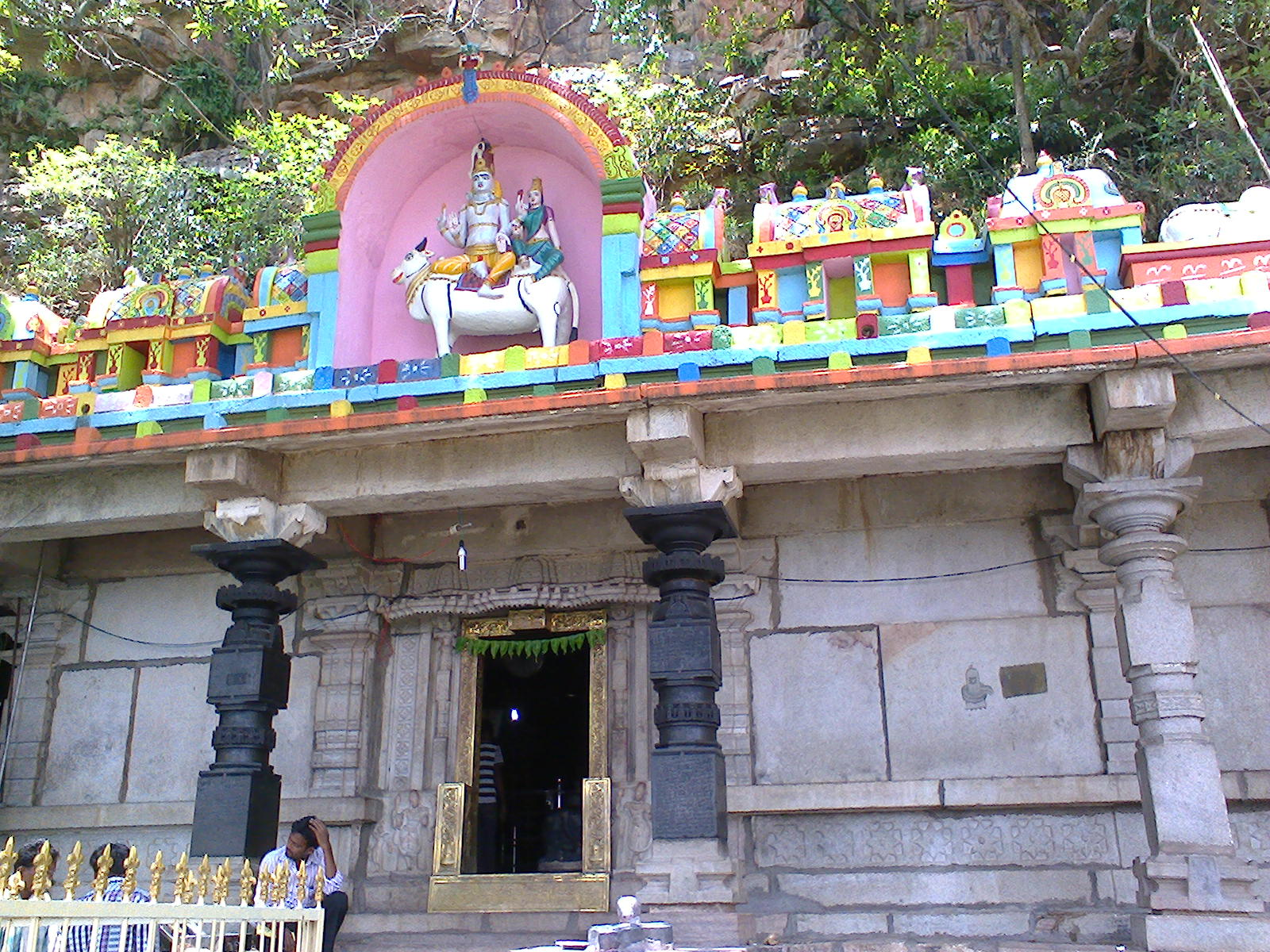
Sri Umamaheswara Temple

Umamaheshwaram (also known as Maheshwaram and Umamaheshrum) is a temple dedicated to the Hindu god Shiva in Telangana, India. It is located in the Nallamala Forest around 100 km from Hyderabad on the Hyderabad-Srisailam highway (NH7), and 4 km from the village of Rangapur, Achampet, Nagarkurnool district.

Umamaheshwaram is the northern gateway of Srisailam—one of the jyotirlingas, on a hill surrounded by high trees. Nearby hills shield the temple and the 500-metre stretch to PapaNasanam from sunlight for most of the day, maintaining a lower temperature than the surroundings throughout the year.
