= Tadoor =

- mandal
- Country: India
- State: Telangana
- District: Nagarkurnool

Government
  - Body: Mandal

Languages
  - Official: Telugu
- Time zone: UTC+5:30 (IST)
- PIN: 509209
- Telephone code: 08540
- Vehicle registration: TG 31
- Nearest city: Nagarkurnool
- Lok Sabha constituency: Nagarkurnool
- Vidhan Sabha constituency: Nagarkurnool
- Civic agency: Mandal
- Climate: hot (Köppen)

Tadoor is a Mandal in Nagarkurnool district, Telangana. Tadoor Mandal Headquarters is Tadoor village. It is located 54 km towards East from District headquarters Nagarkurnool. 113 km from State capital Hyderabad towards North.

Tadoor Mandal is bounded by Nagarkurnool district towards west, Telkapalle Mandal towards East, Bijinapalle Mandal towards west, Kalwakurthy Mandal towards North. Nagarkurnool City, Kalwakurthy city, Badepalle City, Wanaparthy City, Mahbubnagar City are the nearby cities to Tadoor.

Tadoor consist of 33 Villages and 19 Panchayats. Yengampalle is the smallest village and Tadoor is the biggest village. It is in the 545 m elevation (altitude).

Srisailam, Kurnool, Hyderabad, Nagarjunsagar, Mantralayam are the prominent tourist destinations that are located nearby.

== Demographics ==
The local language of the area is Telugu. But it is also common for people there to speak Hindi and Urdu. The total population of Tadoor Mandal is 38,609 living in 7,797 Houses,
Spread across total 33 villages and 19 panchayats. Males are 19,403 and Females are 19,206

== Weather and Climate ==
Temperatures get extremely high in the summer months, during the day ranging from 33 °C to 46 °C.
. In January, the average temperature is 25 °C, February, 25 °C, March, 30 °C, April, 32 °C and in May, it is 36 °C.

== How to reach Tadoor Mandal ==
By Rail
The closest railway station to Tadoor Mandal in more than 10 km. away; Jadcharla and Mahabubnagar railway stations are the closest. However, Hyderabad Decan Railway Station is major railway station 109 km away from Tadoor.

By Road
Nagarkurnool and Kalwakurthy are the closest towns to Tadoor having direct road connectivity.

By Bus
Kalwakurthy APSRTC depot runs buses between Nagarkurnool and Kalwakurthy. Tadoor is on this way 20 km from Kalwakurthy and 14 km from Tadoor to Nagarkurnool. There are few direct buses from Tadoor to Hyderabad via Kalwakurthy.

== Institutions ==
- Zilla Parishad High School.

== Villages ==
The villages in Tadoor mandal include:

1. Aithole
2. Akunellikuduru
3. Allapur
4. Antharam
5. Bhallanpalle
6. Cherlaitikyala
7. Govindayapalle
8. Gunthakoduru
9. Indrakal
10. Kummera
11. Medipur
12. Nagadevupalle
13. Papagal
14. Parvathayapalle
15. Polmur
16. Sirsawada
17. Tadoor
18. Thirumalapur
19. Thummalasugur
20. Yadireddipalle
21. Yatidharpally
22. Yatmatapur
23. Yengampalle
