= Challa Vamshi Chand Reddy =

Indian politician

Member of Telangana Legislative Assembly
- In office 2014–2018
- Preceded by: Gurka Jaipal Yadav
- Succeeded by: Gurka Jaipal Yadav
- Constituency: Kalwakurthy

Personal details
- Born: Challa Vamshi Chand Reddy Seri Appareddypally, Mahbubnagar
- Party: Indian National Congress
- Spouse: Challa Ashlesha Reddy
- Website: Challavamshichandreddy.com

Challa Vamshi Chand Reddy is an Indian politician and a member of the Indian National Congress party. In 2014 he was elected as an MLA from Kalwakurthy constituency, situated in Mahbubnagar district of Telangana, India. Before being elected as an MLA, he was the President of Andhra Pradesh Youth Congress.

Vamshi was appointed as a member of Empowered Action Group of Leaders and Experts (EAGLE) which was constituted by Indian National Congress on 2 February 2025 to monitor the conduct of free and fair elections by the Election Commission of India.

== Personal life ==
He was born in Seri Appareddypally, Mahaboobnagar district into a middle-class family. His father was a Government employee.

== Education ==
He did his schooling from Board of Intermediate Education and a Gandhi medical college dropout.

== Political career ==
In 2012, he was elected as the President of Andhra Pradesh Youth Congress. The election holds significance as it was for the first time when the President was not nominated but democratically elected. The election was the idea of Rahul Gandhi who wanted to promote internal democracy in the party. He was briefly suspended from Congress party for instigating a mob to attack Reliance Inc Outlets, based on a Russian website.

Year	Position
2014	Member of Legislative Assembly, Kalwakurthy
2012 - 2014	State President, Andhra Pradesh Youth Congress
2011 - 2012	NSUI Election Commission, Assam
2006 - 2010	State President, National Students' Union of India (NSUI)
2005 - 2006	NSUI State General Secretary
2000 - 2005	NSUI College President, Gandhi Medical College
2 February 2025 -	Empowered Action Group of Leaders and Experts (EAGLE) Committee Member
18 July 2025 -	AICC In charge for coordinating the DCC (District Congress Committee) presidents’ selection process nationwide

== Electoral History ==
=== Lok Sabha ===
Year	Constituency	Party	Votes	%	Opponent	Party	Votes	%	Result	Margin	%
2019	Mahabubnagar	INC	1,93,631	19.66	Manne Srinivas Reddy	BRS	4,11,402	41.78	Lost	-2,17,771	-22.12
2024	Mahabubnagar	INC	5,06,247	41.44	Aruna D. K.	BJP	5,10,747	41.80	Lost	-4,500	-0.36
