= Rama Giri =

The Rama Giri Valeeswarar Swami temple is a Shiva temple located near the Dhundhubhi River (part of the Krishna River) in Raghupathipeta village, Kalwakurthy Mandal, Palamoor District (also known as Mahbubnagar) in Telangana, India.

The temple has an 800-year history, dating from the 12th Century. The New temple on the hill is built in 1969.
