= Dhundhubhi =

Dhundhubhi may refer to

- A musical instrument
- The name of year Dhundhubhi (1503)
- “A terrible expert “ in Sanskrit
- Dhundhubhi River
