= Peddur, Mahabubnagar district =

Peddur or Pedduru is a village within Telkapalle Mandal formerly in Mahbubnagar district, now in Nagarkurnool district, in the Indian state of Telangana.
