= Palakurthi Assembly constituency =

Constituency of the Telangana legislative assembly in India

Coordinates: 17.66°N 79.43°E

Palakurthi
- Constituency No. 100 for the Telangana Legislative Assembly
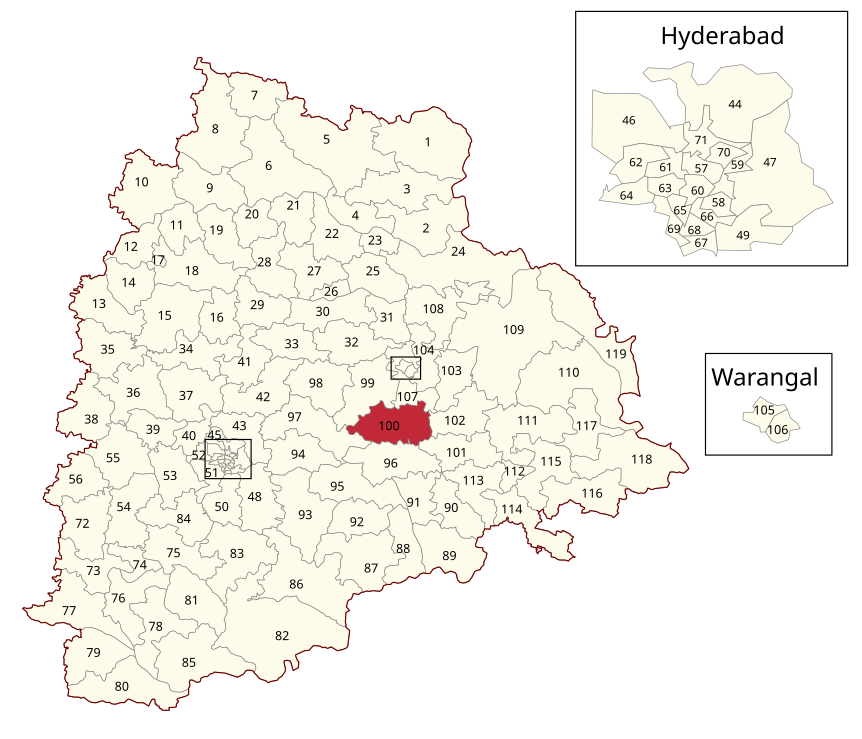
- Location of Palakurthi Assembly constituency within Telangana

Constituency details
- Country: India
- Region: South India
- State: Telangana
- District: Warangal
- Lok Sabha constituency: Warangal
- Established: 2008
- Total electors: 2,00,775
- Reservation: None

Member of Legislative Assembly
- 3rd Telangana Legislative Assembly
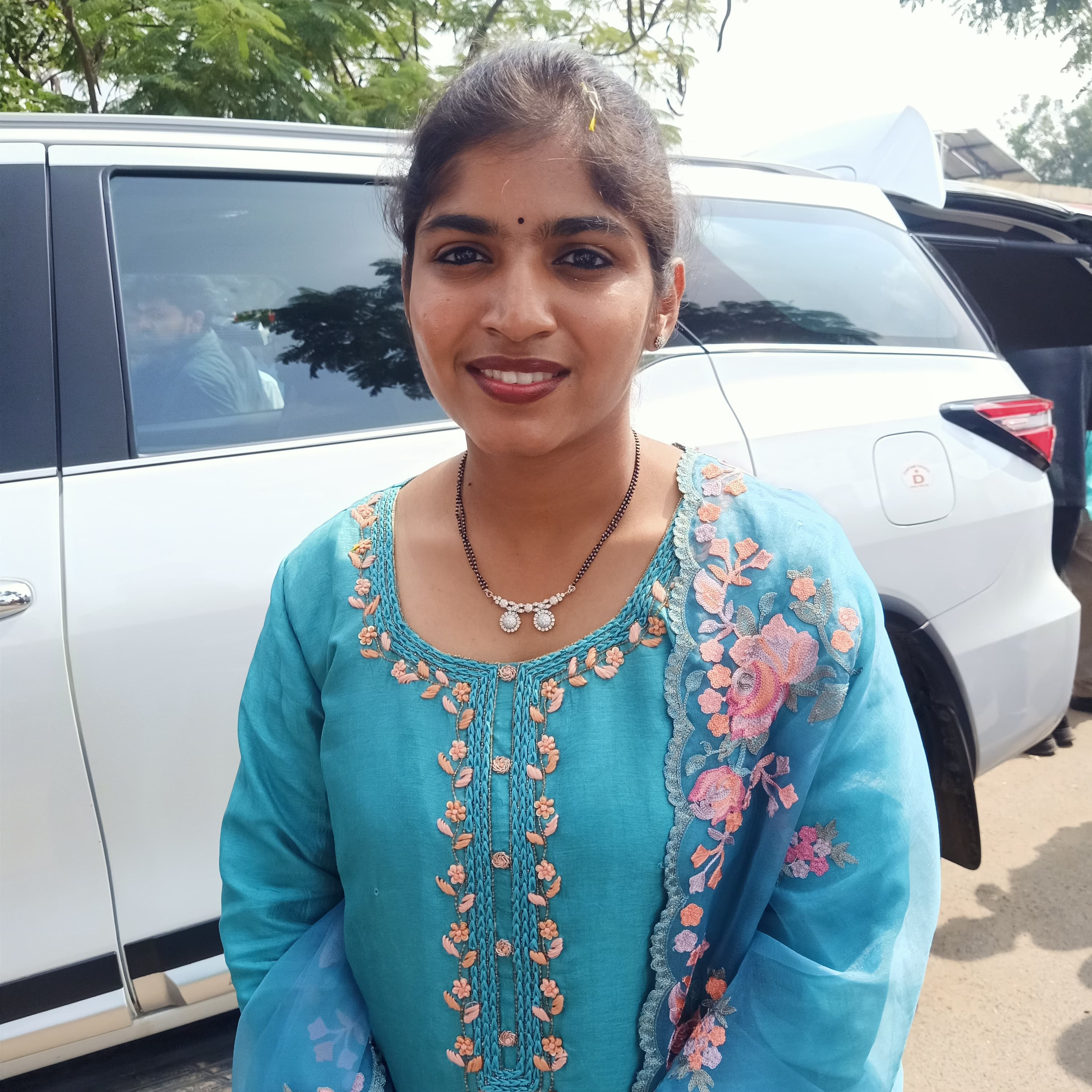
- Incumbent Mamidala Yashaswini Reddy
- Party: Indian National Congress
- Elected year: 2023

Palakurthi Assembly constituency is a constituency of the Telangana Legislative Assembly. It is part of Warangal Lok Sabha constituency. The constituency was created mainly from Chennur Assembly constituency during the reorganization before the 2009 election. The constituency spans across three districts: Warangal Rural, Jangaon and Mahabubabad.

Mamidala Yashaswini Reddy of Indian National Congress is currently representing the constituency.

== Mandals ==
The assembly constituency presently comprises the following mandals:

Mandal	Districts
Palakurthi	Jangaon
Devaruppula	Jangaon
Kodakandla	Jangaon
Raiparthy	Warangal
Thorrur	Mahabubabad
Peddavangara	Mahabubabad

== Members of the Legislative Assembly ==
Year	Member	Political party
1957	S. Venkata Krishna Prasad Rao	People's Democratic Front
1962	Nemarugommula Yethiraja Rao	Socialist Party
1967	Nemarugommula Vimala Devi	Indian National Congress
1972	Kundoor Madhusudhan Reddy	Independent politician
1978	Nemarugommula Yethiraja Rao	Indian National Congress
1983	Nemarugommula Yethiraja Rao	Indian National Congress
1985	Nemarugommula Yethiraja Rao	Telugu Desam Party
1989	Nemarugommula Yethiraja Rao	Telugu Desam Party
1994	Nemarugommula Yethiraja Rao	Telugu Desam Party
1999	Nemarugommula Sudhakar Rao	Telugu Desam Party
2004	Dugyala Srinivasa Rao	Telangana Rashtra Samithi
2009	Errabelli Dayakar Rao	Telugu Desam Party
2014	Errabelli Dayakar Rao	Telugu Desam Party
2018	Errabelli Dayakar Rao	Telangana Rashtra Samithi
2023	Mamidala Yashaswini Reddy	Indian National Congress

== Elections ==
=== Assembly election 2023 ===
2023 Telangana Legislative Assembly election: Palakurthi
Party	Candidate	Votes	%	±%
INC	Mamidala Yashaswini Reddy	126,848	57.62	
BRS	Errabelli Dayakar Rao	79,214	35.98	
Independent	Madavapeddi Venkat Reddy	4,146	1.88	
BJP	Lega Rammohan Reddy	2,982	1.35	
NOTA	None of the Above	2,743	1.25	
Majority		47,634	21.64	
Turnout		2,20,195	87.51	
INC gain from TRS		Swing		

=== Telangana Legislative Assembly election, 2018 ===
2018 Telangana Legislative Assembly election: Palakurthi
Party	Candidate	Votes	%	±%
TRS	Errabelli Dayakar Rao	117,504	59.19	
INC	Janga Ragava Reddy	64,451	32.47	
NOTA	None of the Above	1,078	0.54	
Majority		53,053	26.72	
Turnout		1,98,519	89.01	
TRS gain from TDP		Swing		

=== Telangana Legislative Assembly election, 2014 ===
2014 Telangana Legislative Assembly election: Palakurthi
Party	Candidate	Votes	%	±%
TDP	Errabelli Dayakar Rao	57,799	32.99	
INC	Dugyala Shrinivas Rao	53,486	30.53	
TRS	Dr. N. Sudhakar Rao	52,253	29.83	
BSP	Ekalavya Chintha	3,195	1.82	
Independent	Dr. Lakavath Lakshminarayana Naik	3,129	1.79	
Independent	Gola Gangarao	1,485	0.85	
NOTA	None of the above	1,103	0.63	
Majority		4,313	2.46	
Turnout		1,75,198	85.20	
TDP hold		Swing		

=== Andhra Pradesh Legislative Assembly election, 2009 ===
2009 Andhra Pradesh Legislative Assembly election: Palakurthi
Party	Candidate	Votes	%	±%
TDP	Errabelli Dayakar Rao	65,280	41.63	
INC	Dugyala Shrinivas Rao	62,617	39.33	
PRP	Nemurugommula Praveen Rao	6,740	4.3	
Majority		2,663	2.3	
Turnout				
TDP win (new seat)				

== See also ==
- List of constituencies of Telangana Legislative Assembly
