= Amrabad =

- Mandal
- Location in Telangana, India Amrabad (India)
- Coordinates: 16.3833°N 78.8333°E
- Country: India
- State: Telangana
- District: Nagarkurnool district
- Elevation: 576 m (1,890 ft)

Languages
  - Official: Telugu
- Time zone: UTC+5:30 (IST)
- Vehicle registration: TS06
- Vidhan Sabha constituency: Achampet
- Climate: cool (Köppen)
- Website: nagarkurnool.telangana.gov.in

Amrabad is a mandal in Nagarkurnool district, Telangana, India. It is the largest mandal in the district area-wise, but population density is less. Large portions of the mandal are occupied by Nallamala Forests. Amrabad also served as the headquarters of the taluka before separate mandals were formed. It is inhabited by tribal population, mostly Chenchus.

== Geography ==
Amrabad is located at 16.3833°N 78.8333°E. The Amrabad plateau is a highly hilly region covered with dense forests and high grass. The nearest town to Amrabad is Achampet, Nagarkurnool District

== Demography ==
According to The Imperial Gazetteer of India, Amrabad in 1901 was a taluk in Mahbubnagar district of Hyderabad State. It had an area of 727 square miles. The population was 20,880 compared with 19,601 in 1891. The headquarters Amrabad has a population of 2,267. It is situated on a plateau, contains a large forest area and is surrounded by hills.

== Transportation ==
The national highway from Mahbubnagar to Srisailam, Achampeta to Srisailam passes through Amrabad. Having rivers on the 3 sides, and a lack of bridges there are not adequate connectivity to other districts.
