= Thimmajipeta =

- mandal
- Country: India
- State: Telangana
- District: Nagarkurnool

Languages
  - Official: Telugu
- Time zone: UTC+5:30 (IST)
- Vehicle registration: AP06
- Climate: hot (Köppen)
- Website: telangana.gov.in

Thimmajipeta is a Mandal in Nagarkurnool district, Telangana.

== Institutions ==
- Zilla Parishad High School for Boys
- Zilla Parishad High School for Girls
- Government Junior Inter College

== Villages ==
The villages in Thimmajipeta mandal include:

- Ammapally
- Appajipalli
- Avancha
- Bajipoor
- Bavajipally
- Buddasamudram
- Chegunta
- Gorita
- Gummakonda
- Ippalapally
- Kodparthy
- Marepalle
- Marikal
- Nerellapally
- Pothireddipally
- Pullagiri
- Rallacheruvu Thanda
- Thimmajipet
- Yadireddipally
