= Nagam Janardhan Reddy =

Indian politician

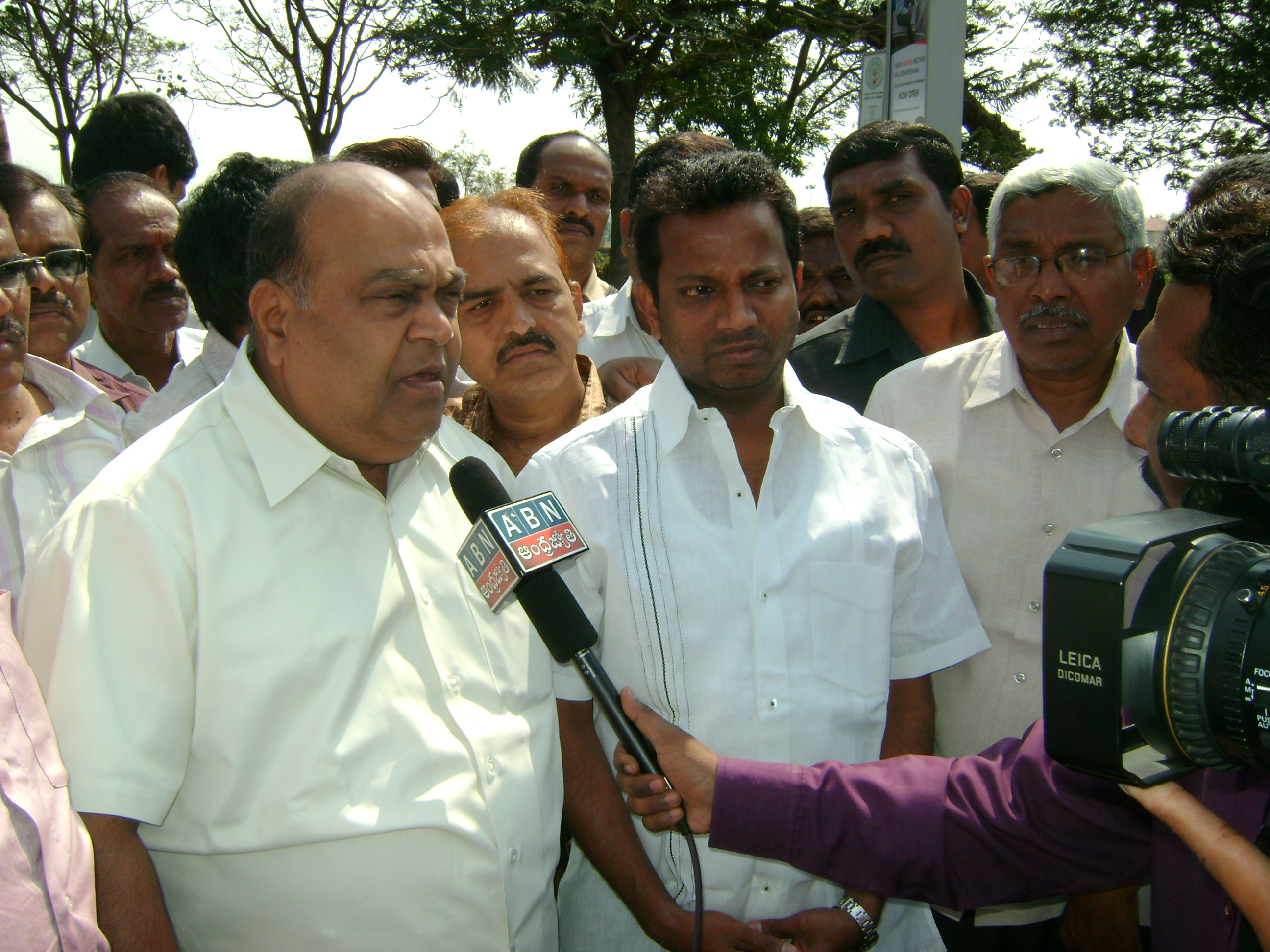
- Nagam Janardhan Reddy addressing media during Telangana agitation

Member of Legislative Assembly, United Andhra Pradesh
- In office 1994–2014
- Preceded by: Vanga Narayan Goud
- Succeeded by: Marri Janardhan Reddy
- Constituency: Nagarkurnool

Minister for Health Government of Andhra Pradesh
- In office 1995–2004
- Chief Minister: N. Chandrababu Naidu

Member of Legislative Assembly, United Andhra Pradesh
- In office 1985–1989
- Preceded by: Vanga Narayan Goud
- Succeeded by: Vanga Narayan Goud
- Constituency: Nagarkurnool

Personal details
- Born: May 22, 1948 (age 77) Nagarkurnool, Mahabubnagar district, Telangana
- Party: Bharat Rashtra Samithi (since 2023)
- Other political affiliations: Indian National Congress (2018–2023); Bharatiya Janata Party (2013‍–‍2018); Telangana Nagara Samithi (2011–2013); Telugu Desam Party (1982‍–‍2011)

Nagam Janardhan Reddy (born May 22, 1948) is an Indian politician. Reddy is a five-term member of the Andhra Pradesh Legislative Assembly, representing the Nagarkurnool constituency.

== Political career ==
Nagam Janardhan Reddy started his political career with Telugu Desam Party. He served as a Member of Legislative Assembly from Nagarkurnool. He was the Minister of Health in the state of United Andhra Pradesh from the year 1995 to 2004.

In the year 2011 he was suspended from the Telugu Desam Party for anti-party activities. He later immediately quit from the assembly in support of creation of a separate Telangana state. Later he floated a new political party 'Telangana Nagara Samithi' merged with Bharatiya Janata Party. In 2012 he again contested from the same constituency as an Independent candidate and was successful.

In 2013 Reddy joined the Bharatiya Janata Party.

In the year 2018 after quitting Bharatiya Janata Party he joined the Indian National Congress Congress party.

On October 31, 2023, he once more switched his affiliation to the BRS party led by KCR.
