= Telugu Cinema Vythalikulu =

2002 research book on Telugu cinema persons by Bulemoni Venkateshwarlu

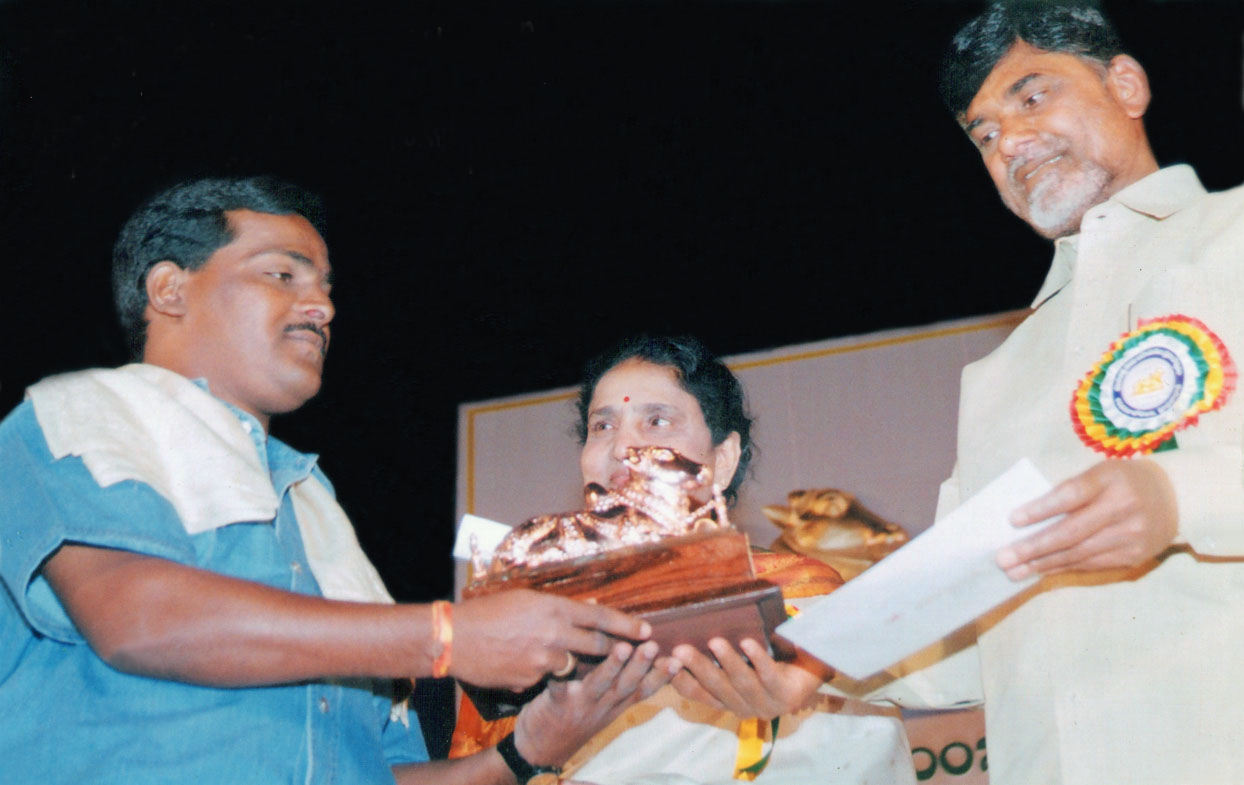
B. Venkateshwarlu (left) receiving Nandi Award from Chief Minister of Andhra Pradesh, Mr. N. Chandrababu Naidu (right).

Telugu Cinema Vythalikulu, (English: The Legends of Telugu Cinema) is a 2002 research book on Telugu cinema persons like directors, actors, artists, producers and technicians, by film critic, writer and journalist Bulemoni Venkateshwarlu. The book is considered one of the major studies of Telugu Filmdom and film personalities between 1908 and 2002.

== Publishing ==
The Telugu Cinema Vythalikulu was published by Nextstep Publications & Entertainments, Hyderabad.

== Content ==
The book covers 142 film personalities from Telugu Cinema in the Silent Era (1908–1930), Early Tollywood (1931–1940), Golden Era (1941–1975), Commercial Culture in Telugu Cinema (1976–2002), and The Modern Era.

== Awards ==
Telugu Cinema Vythalikulu was selected for Nandi Awards from Government of Andhra Pradesh, India in 2002.
