= Padakal =

Coordinates: 16.935129°N 78.400845°E

Padakal or Padkal or Padakallu is a village in Talakondapalle mandal of Ranga Reddy district in Telangana, India. It is 15 km away from Srisailam Highway. Talakondapalle (6 km approx), Raviched (6 km), SeriRamaKrishnaPuram (3 km approx) and Kadthal (15 km) are its neighboring villages. The population is 2500 male people and 2500 females in this village. 60 percent of people are educated.

The village has Venkateswara Swamy Temple and it has much significance. It has APGVB bank.
