= Errabelli Dayakar Rao =

Indian politician

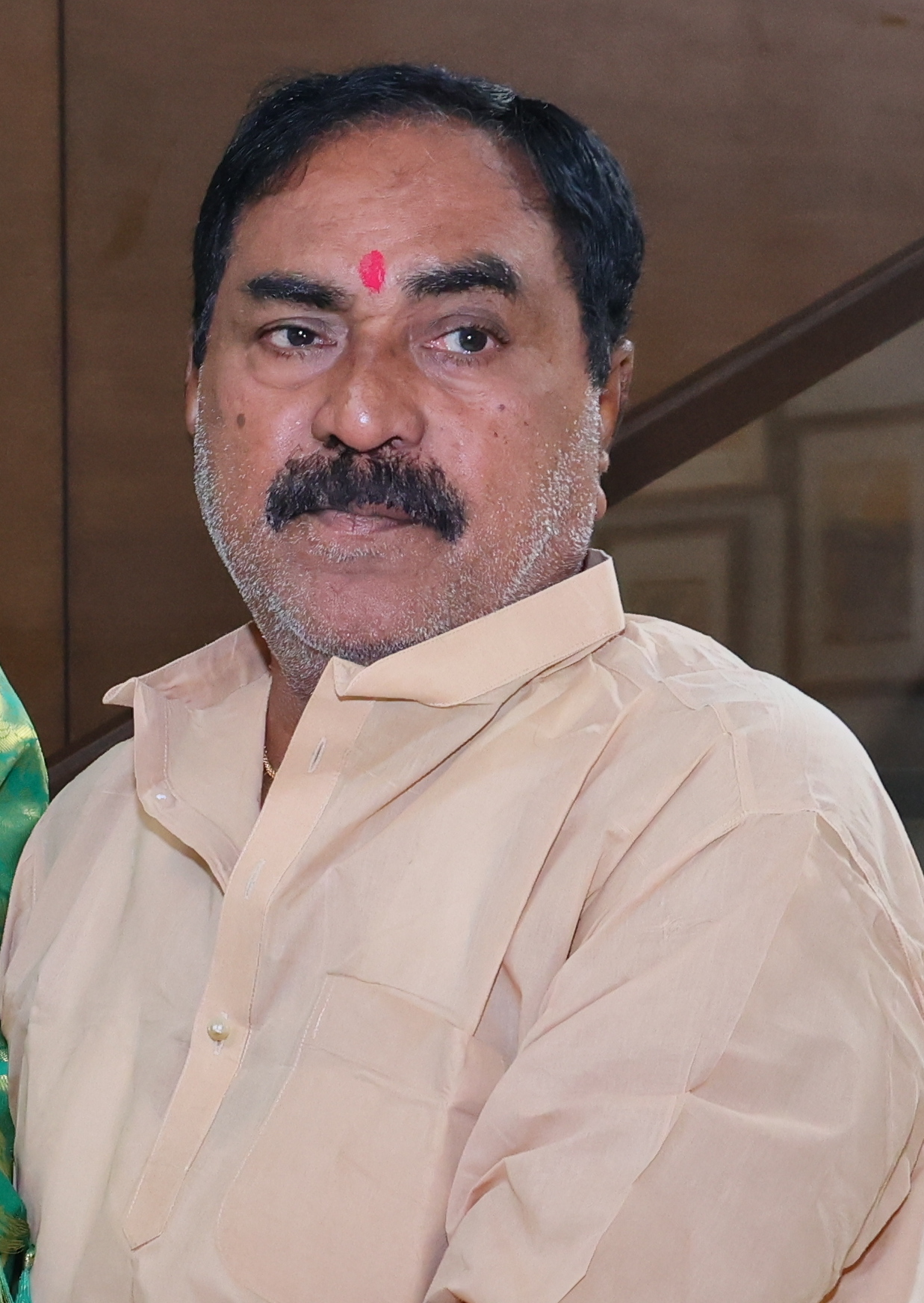

Minister of Panchayat Raj and Rural Development Government of Telangana
- In office 19 February 2019 – 3 December 2023
- Governor: Tamilisai Soundararajan
- Chief Minister: K. Chandrashekar Rao
- Preceded by: Jupally Krishna Rao
- Succeeded by: Seethakka

Member of Legislative Assembly, Telangana
- In office 2 June 2014 – 3 December 2023
- Preceded by: Telangana Assembly Created
- Succeeded by: Mamidala Yashaswini Reddy
- Constituency: Palakurthi

Member of Parliament, Lok Sabha
- In office 2008–2009
- Preceded by: Dharavath Ravinder Naik
- Succeeded by: Siricilla Rajaiah
- Constituency: Warangal

Member of Legislative Assembly, Andhra Pradesh
- In office 2009–2014
- Preceded by: Constituency Established
- Succeeded by: Telangana Assembly Created
- Constituency: Palakurthi
- In office 1994–2008
- Preceded by: Takkallapalli Rajeshwar Rao
- Succeeded by: Kondeti Sridhar
- Constituency: Wardhannapet

Personal details
- Born: 15 August 1956 (age 70)
- Party: Bharat Rashtra Samithi (since 2016)
- Other political affiliations: Telugu Desam Party (until 2016)
- Website: https://errabellidayakarrao.officialpress.in/

Errabelli Dayakar Rao is an Indian politician who is the former Minister for Panchayat Raj and Rural Development, Rural Water Supply for Telangana state and former Member of the Telangana Legislative Assembly from Palakurthi constituency. He was the member of the Parliament of India. He was elected six times to Legislative Assembly.

Errabelli represents Palakurthi constituency of Jangaon district in the Telangana Legislative Assembly. The state of Telangana came into being when Andhra Pradesh was bifurcated and prior to that time, Rao had been elected on several occasions from Wardhannapet constituency to the Andhra Pradesh Legislative Assembly.

Errabelli was also briefly a member of the 14th Lok Sabha for the Warangal constituency. He contested a by-election for the seat in June 2008 when numerous members of the Bharat Rashtra Samiti(BRS)formerly Telangana Rashtra Samiti(TRS) resigned their seats in both the Parliament of India and the Andhra Pradesh Legislative Assembly in protest. He defeated the sitting TRS politician, Dharavath Ravindra Naik, in the constituency.

In February 2016, Errabelli left the TDP in favour of the TRS. He was at that time leader of the TDP in the Assembly.

== Electoral History ==
Year	Constituency	Party	Votes	%	Opponent	Party	Votes	%	Result	Margin	%
1983	Wardhannapet	Independent	13,773	19.91	Macherla Jagannadham	INC	27,232	39.37	Lost	-13,459	-19.46
1994	Wardhannapet	TDP	58,168	53.69	Yerrabelli Varada Rajeshwar Rao	INC	35,993	33.22	Won	+22,175	+20.47
1999	Wardhannapet	TDP	62,593	50.18	Swarna Yerrabelli	INC	51,010	40.89	Won	+11,583	+9.29
2004	Wardhannapet	TDP	68,302	50.60	Muthireddy Yadagiri Reddy	JP	43,208	32.01	Won	+25,094	+18.59
2008 (Note: By-election)	Warangal	TDP	4,21,288	40.50	Podduturi Rameshwar Reddy	INC	4,16,902	40.08	Won	+4,386	+0.42
2009	Palakurthi	TDP	65,280	41.63	Dugyala Srinivas Rao	INC	62,617	39.93	Won	+2,663	+1.70
2014	Palakurthi	TDP	57,799	32.99	Dugyala Shrinivas Rao	INC	53,486	30.53	Won	+4,313	+2.46
2018	Palakurthi	TRS	1,17,504	59.19	Janga Raghava Reddy	INC	64,451	32.47	Won	+53,053	+26.72
2023	Palakurthi	BRS	79,214	35.98	Mamidala Yashaswini Reddy	INC	1,26,848	57.62	Lost	-47,634	-21.64

== Cabinet Roles ==
Tenure	Ministry	Chief Minister	Government / State	Party
19 February 2019 – 3 December 2023	Minister for Panchayat Raj, Rural Development, and Rural Water Supply	K. Chandrashekar Rao	Telangana	TRS / BRS
