= B. Venkateshwarlu =

Indian film director

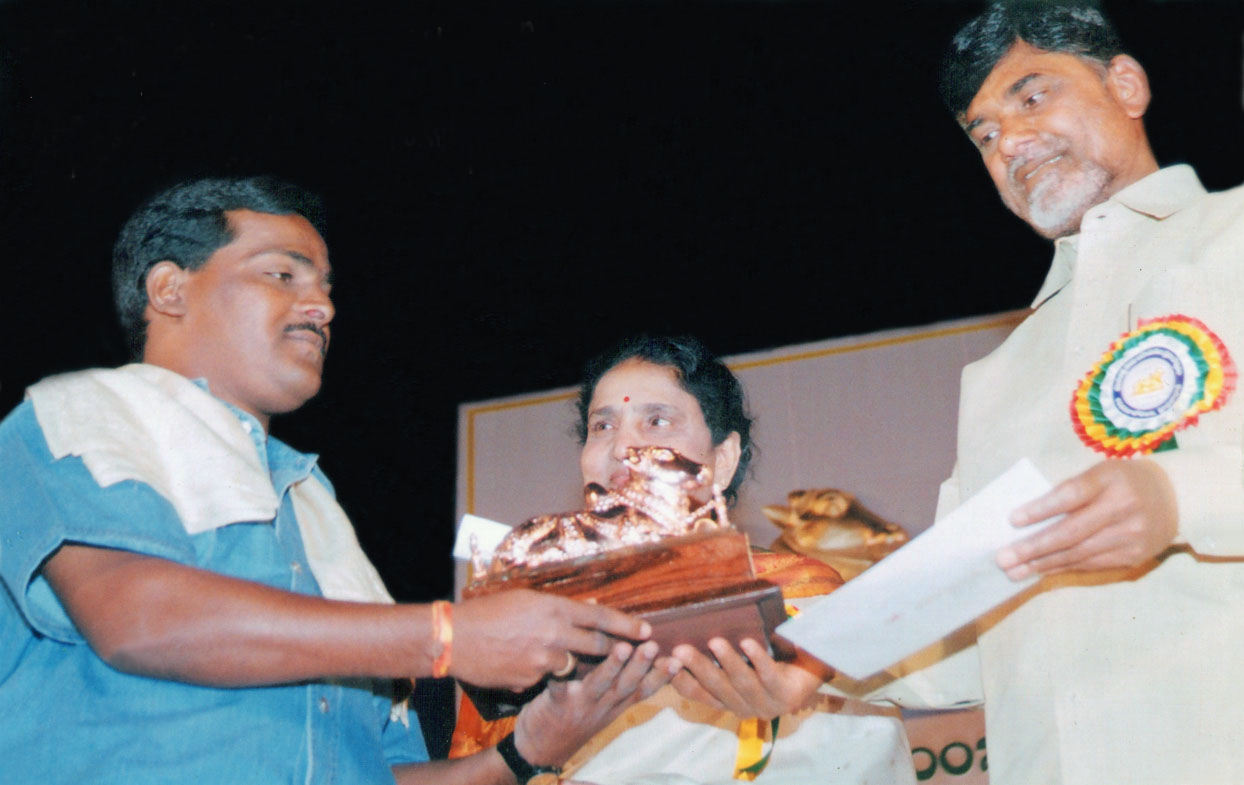
- B. Venkateshwarlu (left) receiving Nandi Award from the then Chief Minister of Andhra Pradesh, Mr. N. Chandrababu Naidu (right)
- Born: Bulemoni Venkateshwarlu; 8 May 1973 (age 53); Charakonda, India
- Occupations: Journalist film director writer

Bulemoni Venkateshwarlu (born 8 May 1973 in Charakonda) is an Indian businessman, Telugu Cinema journalist, writer, and film director. He is the son of B. Kanakappa, who is a Government Primary School teacher. Venkateshwarlu was a noted journalist, and he is into a media career from 1990. In recognition for his efforts in researching films he has received the Nandi Award as Best Book Writer and Journalist by the government of Andhra Pradesh.

== Personal background ==
Venkateshwarlu was born to Bulemoni Kanakappa and Bulemoni Kamalamma and did his schooling at government primary and high school of Charakonda village, and later continued his academics at Narayanpet of Mahbubnagar district for higher studies. He completed his intermediate in Government Junior College, Narayanpet, and bachelor's degree in Hyderabad. He did his Diploma in Screenplay writing in Doordarshan Kendra, Ramanthapur, Hyderabad. He completed his Diploma in Motion Picture Arts and Science from the Academy of Art University, the USA through distance learning.

== Career ==
Venkateshwarlu paints and sings. He worked as a reporter in Eenadu Telugu news daily from 1989 to 1995, later he worked as a script writer in the State Institute of Education Technology (SIET), Doordarshan (a UNESCO aided Educational Project). He did research on Telugu Cinema and has written the books Telugu Cinema Charitra (1997), and Telugu Cinema Vythalikulu (2002), published and released with his own Nextstep Publications & Entertainments. For these two books, he received the Nandi Awards from the government of Andhra Pradesh. He also wrote a research book on the history of Chilkur temples, Chilkuru Kshetra Charitra in 2004. This is the first research book on Chilkur Balaji Temple or Chilukuru Balaji Temple. In 2005, Venkateshwarlu directed Trivarnam – Every Indian Heartbeat, a patriotic video album in Telugu. This was the first patriotic video album in Telugu. He worked as a Creative Director and Film Analyst in Pyramid Saimira Theatre Limited from 2006 to 2009. At this time Venkateshwarlu don lot of film promotion works for Pyramid Saimira Theatre Limited for leading films inclusive of Sivaji, Shankar Dada Zindabad, Saroja, Naan Kadavul, Mozhi, Avva, Yamadonga, Pokkiri, Azhagiya Tamil Magan, Villu, Kachche Dhaage etc. In 2009, Venkateshwarlu directed Maisigandi Kshetra Charitra – a mythological documentary film on the Maisigandi Temple's history in Telugu. Farmer Chief Minister of United Andhra Pradesh Dr Y. S. Rajasekhara Reddy released this documentary film on 21 July 2009. He worked as Director for The Federation of Andhra Pradesh Chambers of Commerce and Industry(FAPCCI). In 2018, he started Cinetaria Media Works, in 2025 Cinetaria Foundation, and in 2026 Monkyco foods LLP.

== Film Branding ==
Venkateshwarlu started film branding firm Cinetaria Media Works in 2018 and provided product placement in films, brand placement in films, brand integration in films and web media services, etc. Cinetaria Media Works is providing brand integration in film services for many upcoming films, inclusive of Sarvam Siddam, Mr. Work from Home, 105 Minutes, Atadu Aame Priyudu, BFH - Boy Friend for Hire, Aadavallu Meeku Johaarlu, Ahimsa, Super Machi, Meeku Maathrame Cheptha, Teeram, Dhamaka, Ra.. Ra.. Peniviti, SIMBA, Shiva 143, Mr. Begger, Nenu Leni Naa Prema Katha, Love U Deyyam, Antha Govinduke Telusu, Induvadana, Nenu Meeku Baaga Kavalasinavadini, Bapatla MP, Choo Mantar, Ramam Raghavam, Mechanic Rocky, The Raja Saab, Brahmachari and many.

== Books ==
=== Telugu Cinema Charitra ===
Telugu Cinema Charitra, (English: The History of Telugu Cinema) is a research book on Telugu Cinema History, by B. Venkateshwarlu, published in 1997. The book is one of the first major studies of Telugu Film Industry between 1908 and 1995. First published in 1997, it was a research book covering five major periods: Telugu Cinema in Silent Era (1912–1930), Early Tollywood (1931–1940), Golden Era (1941–1975), Commercial Culture in Telugu Cinema (1976–1995) and The Modern Era. The book also includes articles on silent movies, world cinema, Bollywood, animation in Tollywood, parallel cinema, Telugu cinema legends. The Nandi Awards committee, constituted by the Government of Andhra Pradesh is appreciated this book.

=== Telugu Cinema Vythalikulu ===
Telugu Cinema Vythalikulu, (English: The Legends of Telugu Cinema) is a research book on personalities in Telugu Film Industry. It includes directors, actors, artists, producers, and technicians and was published in 2002. The book is one of the major studies of Telugu Film Industry and film personalities between 1908 and 2002. Telugu Cinema Vythalikulu was published by Next Step Publications & Entertainments, Hyderabad and marketed by Vishalandra Publishing House, Prajashakti Publishing House and Navodaya Publishing House. First published in 2002, it covered 142 film personalities from Telugu Cinema in Silent Era (1908–1930), Early Tollywood, (1931–1940), Golden Era, (1941–1975), Commercial Culture in Telugu Cinema (1976–2002) and The Modern Era. Telugu Cinema Vythalikulu was selected for the Nandi Awards by the government of Andhra Pradesh.

=== Chilkur Kshetra Charitra ===
Chilukuru Kshetra Charitra is a historical and research book on the Chilkur Balaji Temple written by Bulemoni Venkateshwarlu in 2005. It was released by Nextstep Publications & Entertainments. It is a book on the history of Chilkur Temple. The book has details about the stone inscriptions, its translations and historical evidences.

=== Telugu Cinema Aanimutyaalu ===
Telugu Cinema Aanimutyaalu is a research book on the most popular films from the Telugu Film Industry, India. For this book, writer Bulemoni Venkateshwarlu has undertaken research on Telugu Films, as well as the Telugu Film industry.

=== Nenu Bratike Unnanu ===
Venkateshwarlu Bulemoni has authored a poetry collection titled Nenu Bratike Unnanu, centered on positive thinking, and it is set for release in 2026.

== Movies ==
- Venkateshwarlu Bulemoni has produced a feature film Sarvam Siddam- Navvukunnollaku Navvukunnantha, a comedy-drama film under Cinetaria Media Works banner under Athimalla Rabin Naidu direction. The movie was released in theaters on April 25, 2025.
- Venkateshwarlu Bulemoni is directing Mayukham and Jhuggi films under Cinetaria Media Works banner. The movie is under Production.

== Novels ==
- Ameena
- Kotha Paata

== Paintings ==
- Un Employee Life
- Our Planet

== Tele series ==
- Alajadi is a thriller based action drama Television Series made in Telugu, written and directed by Bulemoni Venkateshwarlu in 2006.

== Music ==
- Trivarnam (Every Indian Heartbeat) is a Patriotic Video Album directed by Bulemoni Venkateshwarlu, produced by Pirati Kondalarao and Pirati Naveen in the banner of Surya Celluloids in 2005. This is the first patriotic video album in Telugu. The Aditya Music was released this video album. Trivarnam music album got appreciations from critics and NRIs.

== Documentary film ==
- Maisigandi Kshetra Charitra is a Mythological documentary film made in Telugu, written and directed by Bulemoni Venkateshwarlu. The documentary was filmed in India. The documentary film was produced by Smt. Siroli Panthu Naik, and Co-Produced by RP Jyothi. Dr. Y. S. Rajasekhara Reddy, Late Chief Minister of Andhra Pradesh released this Documentary film on 21 July 2009.
- Telugu Cinema: Glory & Glitz is a forthcoming documentary film on Telugu Cinema industry Tollywood. Telugu Cinema Recognized the world over as Tollywood, Telugu Cinema is the largest producer of films in the regional languages of India and is in good competition with movies made in India's national language – Hindi.

== Startups UnLimiteD ==
Startups UnLimiteD is a forthcoming television reality show created by Venkateshwarlu Bulemoni to support aspirants in becoming entrepreneurs. The Startups UnLimiteD television reality show is produced by Cinetaria Media Works and broadcast on a leading Telugu TV Channel from Autumn 2028 onwards.

Startups UnLimiteD is a televised contest that combines the high drama and popularity of Reality TV with educational content to create "edutainment".

== Awards ==
- He won Nandi Award for Best Book on Telugu Cinema - Telugu Cinema Vythalikulu (2002)
- Award as The Best Writer from Yuvakalavahini Cultural Organaisation in 1997.
- Best Artist (Painting): Rajiv Gandhi Memorial Award for his painting of "Un-employee life" from Youth affairs, Government of India, in 1995.
