= Telugu Cinema Charitra =

Book about the silent film era in India

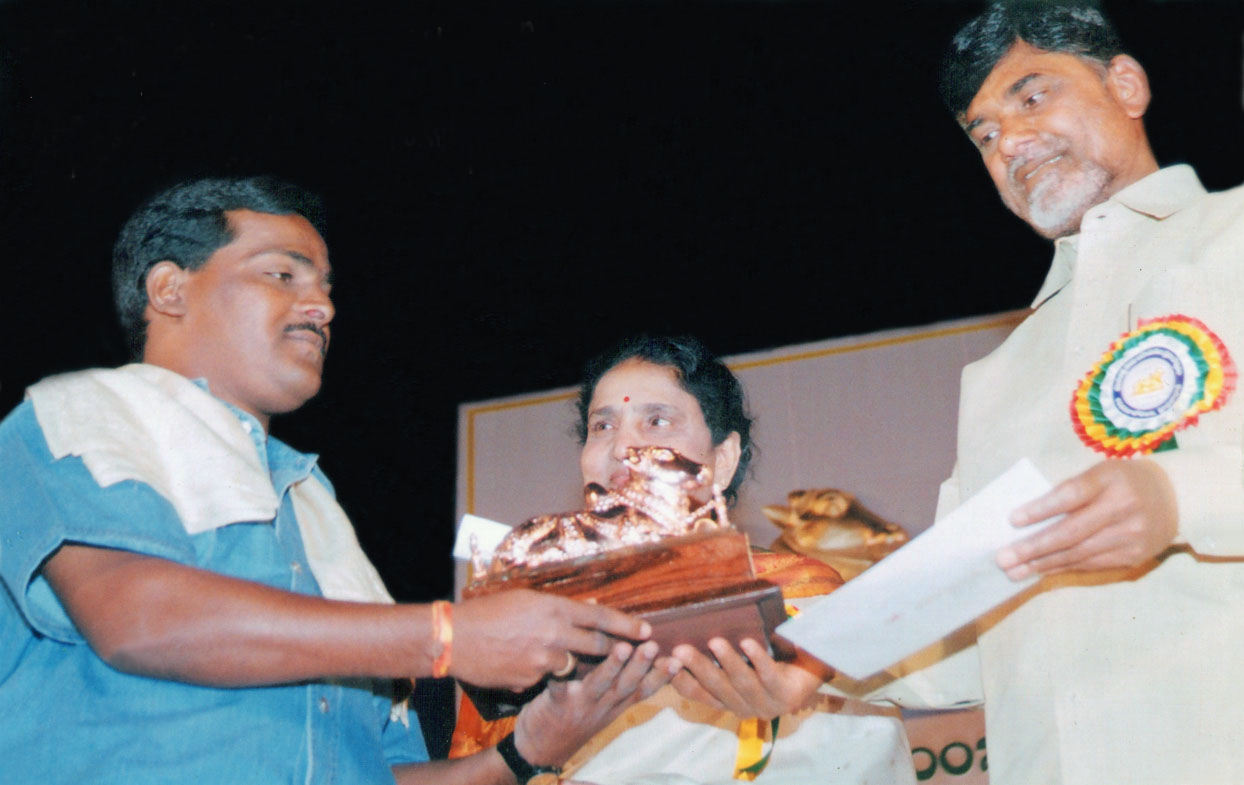
B. Venkateshwarlu (left) receiving Nandi Award from Chief Minister of Andhra Pradesh, Mr. N. Chandrababu Naidu (right).

Telugu Cinema Charitra, (English: The History of Telugu Cinema; Telugu: తెలుగు సినిమా చరిత్ర) is a research book on Telugu Cinema History, by film critic, writer and Journalist B. Venkateshwarlu, published in 1997. The book is considered one of the first major studies of Telugu Film Industry between 1912 and 1995.

Since 1909, filmmaker Raghupathi Venkaiah was involved in producing short films and travelling to different regions in Asia to promote film work. In 1921, he produced the silent film called Bhishma Prathigna. He is cited as the father of telugu cinema.

== Contents ==
First published in 1997, it covered five major periods: Telugu Cinema in the Silent Era (1912–1930) Early Tollywood (1931–1940), Golden Era (1941–1975), Commercial Culture in Telugu Cinema (1976–1995) and The Modern Era. The book also includes as articles, such Silent Movie, World Cinema, Bollywood, Animation in Tollywood, Parallel Cinema, Telugu Cinema Legends in this film.

== Awards ==
Telugu Cinema Charitra book selected for prestigious Nandi Awards from Government of Andhra Pradesh, India in 1997.
