= Vennu Mallesh =

Indian singer

- Born: Achampet, Telangana, India
- Occupation: Singer
- Years active: 2012–present

Vennu Mallesh is an Indian singer, who is best known for his song "It's My Life What Ever I Wanna Do", which was released in 2012 on YouTube.

== Critical reception ==
The Hindustan Times referred to Mallesh's videos as "mind-numbingly cringeworthy". It later said that Mallesh and others like him "are all ordinary folk who have relied on YouTube videos to attain the stardom they enjoy today. This makes them more relatable and engaging."

The Quint wrote: "The cringe pop genre has seen singers like Taher Shah and Vennu Mallesh attain cult following."

The Huffington Post wrote: "In Summer 2012's pantheon of viral hits, the singer's first song is but a minor deity, but to him, it's a personal creedo".

== Selected discography ==
Year	Song name	Composer	Singer	Lyrics	Notes
2012	"It's My Life What Ever I Wanna Do"	Yes	Yes	Yes	Co-singer: Lipsika Bhashyam
2012	"Wish U Enjoy New Year"	Yes	Yes	Yes	Removed from YouTube
2013	"I Love U Dear"	Yes	Yes	Yes	
2013	"12 Angry Men"	Yes	Yes	Yes	
2014	"Ice Bucket Challenge"	Yes	Yes	Yes	Also director and producer of music video
2015	"United India"	Yes	Yes	Yes	Also director and producer of music video
2015	"Made For Us"	Yes	Yes	Yes	Removed from YouTube; Rendition of They Don’t Really Care about Us
2018	"Baby Girl"	No	Yes	No	Music and lyrics: Abhi Guda
