= Nagarjunsagar-Srisailam Tiger Reserve =

Tiger reserve in India

- IUCN category IV (habitat/species management area)
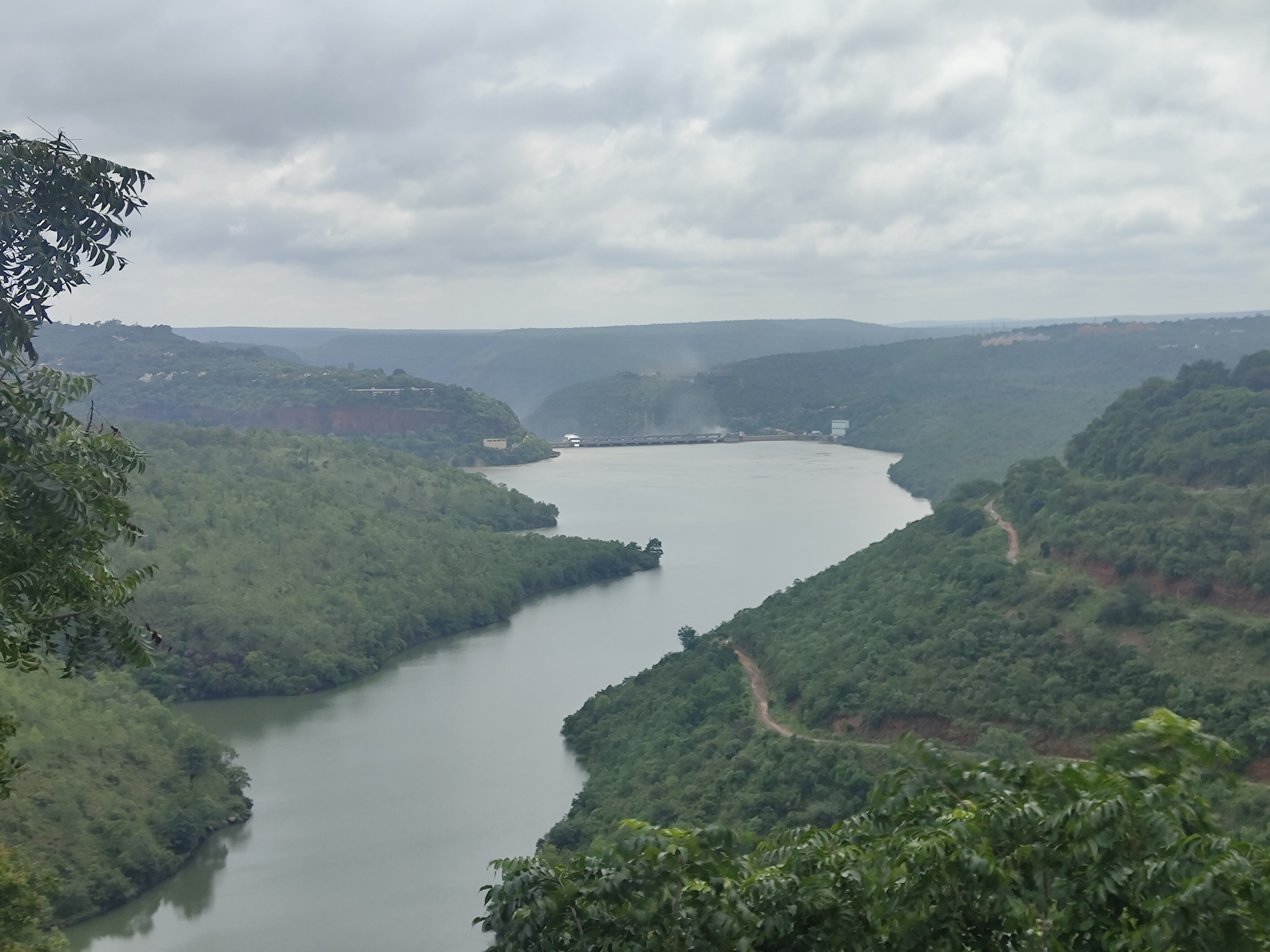
- Srisailam Tiger reserve sign board

- Location within Andhra Pradesh Location within Telangana Location within India
- Interactive map of Nagarjunsagar-Srisailam Tiger Reserve
- Location: Nandyal, Palnadu, Prakasam, Andhra Pradesh; (( Amrabad Tiger Reserve in Nagarkurnool, Nalgonda district, Telangana ))
- Nearest city: Hyderabad
- Coordinates: 16°18′N 78°59′E
- Area: 3,728 km^{2} (1,439 sq mi)
- Established: 1983
- Governing body: NTCA , Government of Telangana
- Operator: Forest Department , Government of Telangana
- Owner: Government of Telangana
- Website: nstr.co.in

Nagarjunsagar-Srisailam Tiger Reserve is the largest tiger reserve in India encompassing an area of 3,728 km^{2} (1,439 sq mi) in two states as two parts: NagarjunaSagar-Srisailam Tiger Reserve in Nandyal, Prakasam, Palnadu, of Andhra Pradesh and as Amrabad Tiger Reserve in Nalgonda and Nagarkurnool districts of Telangana. Its core area is 1,200 km^{2} (460 sq mi).

== Geography ==
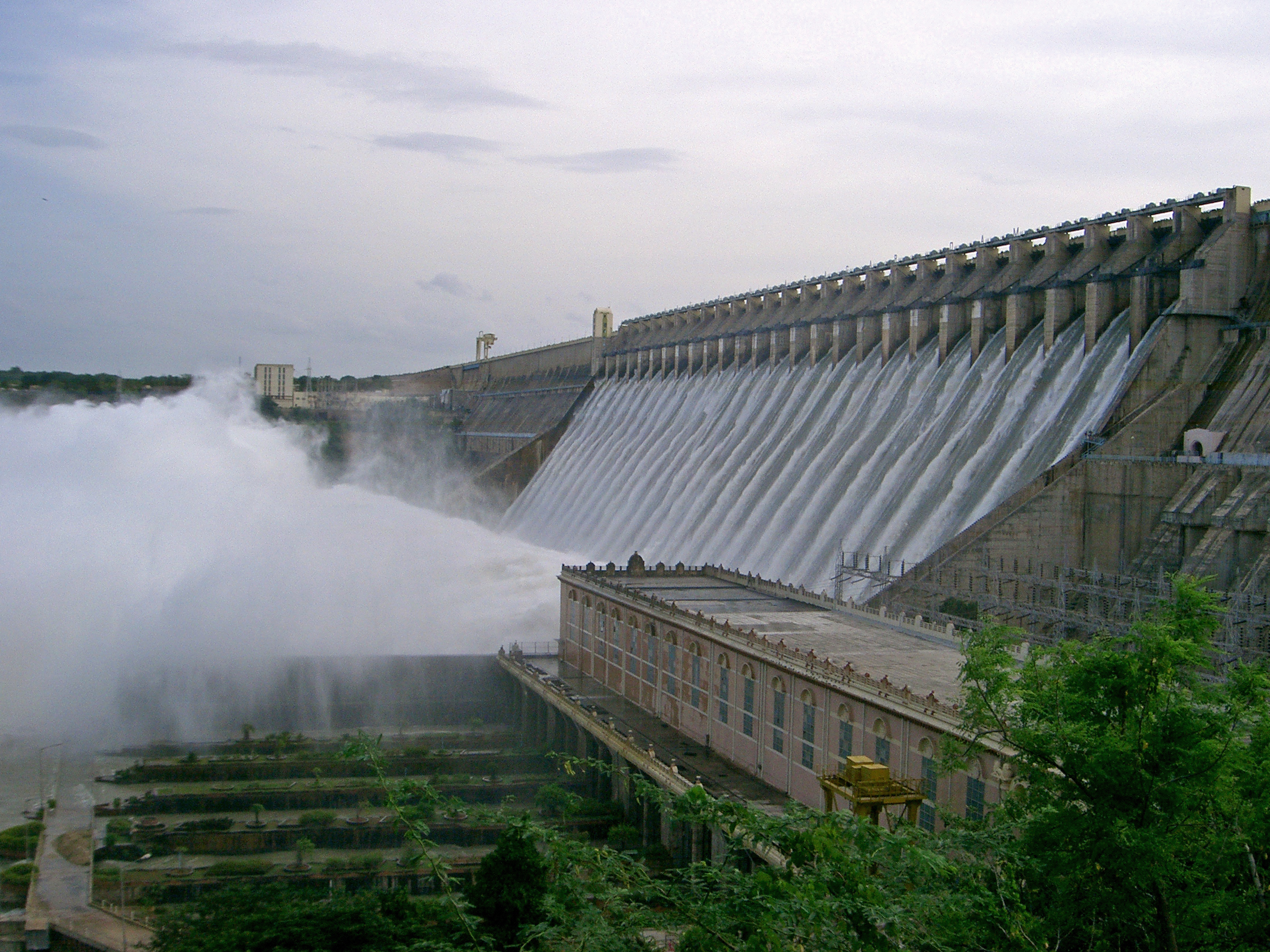
Nagarjuna Sagar Dam

The hill ranges contain a number of plateaus including Amrabad, Srisailam, Peddacheruvu, Sivapuram, and Nekkanti. Nagarjunasagar receives rains from the southwest monsoon, which is active from the second half of June to the end of September. The Krishna River cuts its basin almost 200 m (660 ft) deep over a distance of 130 km (81 mi) through the reserve. There are several waterfalls in the reserve such as the Ethipothala Falls, Pedda Dukudu, Gundam and Chaleswaram.

This reserve is located between longitude: 78°30' to 79°28' east and latitude: 15°53' to 16°43' north. Elevation varies from 100 to 917 m (328 to 3,009 ft). Average annual rainfall is 1,000 mm (39 in).

== History ==
This area contains several rock shelters and cave temples including: Akka Mahadevi Bhilam, Dattatreya Bhilam, Umaa Maheswaram, Kadalivanam, and Palankasari.

== Flora ==
The main types of forest biomes in the reserve are: southern tropical dry mixed deciduous forest, Hardwickia forest and Deccan thorn scrub forests with much Euphorbia scrub. Important plant species here are: Anogeissus latifolia (axlewood), Cleisthanthus collinus (odcha), Terminalia spp., Pterocarpus marsupium, Hardwickia binata (anjan tree), Boswellia serrata (Indian frankincense or salai), Tectona grandis (teak), Mundulea sericea and Albizia spp. (silkplants).

== Fauna ==
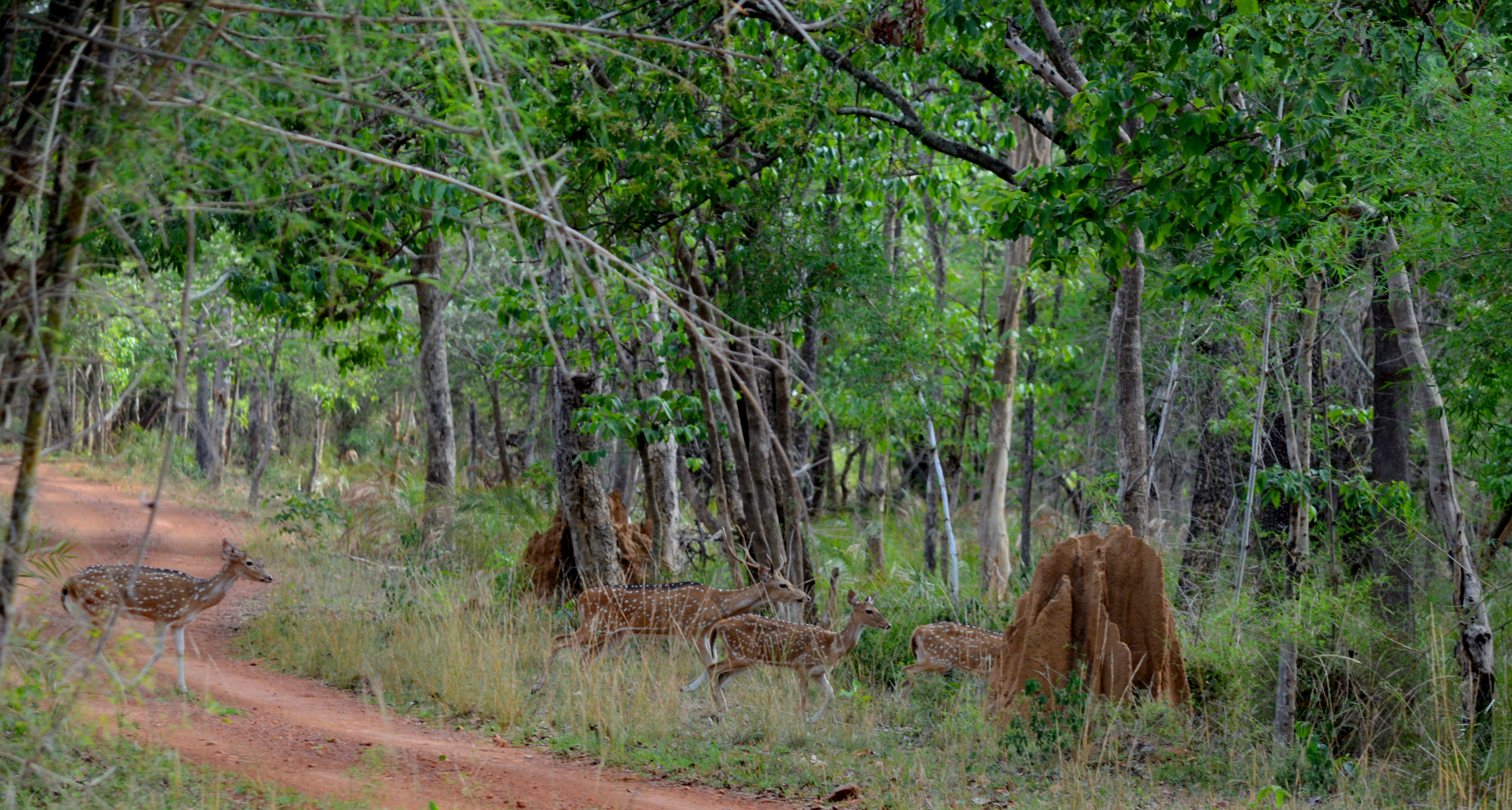
Spotted deer in Nagarjunsagar-Srisailam Tiger Reserve, Telangana

The main mammals in the reserve are: Bengal tiger, Indian leopard, sloth bear, dhole, Indian pangolin, chital, sambar deer, chevrotain, blackbuck, chinkara and chowsingha. Lesser fauna include mugger crocodile, Indian python, Indian cobra, rat snake, Bengal monitor, Indian star tortoise and Indian peafowl.

== Economic valuation of ecosystem services ==
In a study (conducted during 2016–2019) that ascertained the economic value of the ecosystem services provided free of cost by the 'Nagarjunasagar Srisailam Tiger Reserve', it was found that the economic value of 'Regulating Services' (such as carbon sequestration, water provisioning and purification, soil conservation, nutrient retention, pollination, climate regulation, gene pool protection, waste assimilation, etc.) amounted to Rs 16,041.15 crore per year. 'Provisioning Services' amounted to Rs 766.99 million per year, while 'Cultural Services' and 'Supporting Services' amounted to Rs 17.40 million per year and Rs 818.11 million per year respectively.
