= Gangaram =

Coordinates: 16°30′28″N 78°09′45″E

Gangaram is a remote village in Bijinapalle Mandal of Nagarkurnool district, Telangana, India.

== History ==
Gangaram, a 130-year-old crocodile, lived in a community pond in Bawa Mohtara village, Bemetara district, Chhattisgarh, India. Despite being a wild animal, Gangaram was deeply revered by the villagers, who considered him a protector and a friend.

=== Unique Bond with the Villagers ===
Gangaram never harmed anyone, even when villagers, including children, swam close to him in the pond. The villagers would share the pond with Gangaram, using it for fetching water and Gangaram would feed on the fish present in the pond. The villagers would also feed Gangaram rice and dal, and he would eat it from their hands.

=== Funeral and Tributes ===
When Gangaram died on January 8, 2019, the villagers mourned his death deeply. Over 500 people attended his funeral procession, which was led by the village head, Mohan Sahu. The villagers buried Gangaram with full respect and dignity, decorating the truck carrying his body with flowers and garlands. People from surrounding villages also joined the funeral procession to pay their last respects.

=== Legacy ===
Gangaram's story highlights the importance of human-animal coexistence. The villagers’ affection and respect for Gangaram set an example of living harmoniously with wild animals. The villagers have also planned to construct a temple in memory of Gangaram, further solidifying their bond with the crocodile.
