= Vangoor =

Mandal in Telangana, India

Vangooru
- village
- Location in Telangana, India
- Coordinates: 16°36′31″N 78°37′27″E
- Country: India
- State: Telangana
- District: Nagarkurnool

Languages
  - Official: Telugu
- Time zone: UTC+5:30 (IST)
- PIN: Machinonpally = Venkatapoor =
- Vehicle registration: TS 06 & TS 31
- Climate: hot (Köppen)

Vongooru is a Mandal in Nagarkurnool district in Telangana.

== Institutions ==
- Zilla Parishad High School
- Indian Overseas Bank
- Government Junior college

== Villages ==
The villages in Vangoor mandal include:

- Annaram
- Charakonda
- Chowdrapalle
- Dindichinthalapalle
- Gajara
- Jajala
- Konapur
- Kondareddipalle
- Konetipur
- Mittasaguda
- Nizamabad
- Polkampalle
- Pothireddipalle
- Rangapur (Yellamma Rangapur)
- Sarvareddipalle
- Sirsangandla
- Thimmaipalle
- Thippareddipalle
- Thumula Palle
- Thurkalapally
- Ulpara
- Ummapur
- Uppal Pahad
- Vongooru
- Venkatapur
