= Bijinapalle =

Bijinapalli Bijinapally
- mandal
- Location in Telangana, India Bijinapalli (India)
- Coordinates: 16.5500°N 78.2000°E
- Country: India
- State: Telangana
- District: Nagar Kurnool
- Elevation: 481 m (1,578 ft)

Languages
  - Official: Telugu
- Time zone: UTC+5:30 (IST)
- Postal code: 509203
- Vehicle registration: TS-31
- Vidhan Sabha constituency: Nagarkurnool
- Climate: hot (Köppen)

Bijnapalli or Bijinapally is a mandal in Nagarkurnool district, Telangana.

== Geography ==
Bijnapalli is located at 16.5500°N 78.2000°E. It has an average elevation of 481 metres (1581 ft).

== Institutions ==
- Zilla Parishad High School for Boys
- Zilla Parishad High School for Girls
- Pragathi Vidyalayam
- Sri Saraswati Vidyaniketan
- All saints model school

== Villages ==
The villages in Bijinapalle mandal include:

- Allipur
- Bijinepally
- Gangaram
- Gouraram
- Gudlanarva
- Kanapur
- Karkonda
- Lattupally
- Lingasanipally
- Mahadevpet
- Manganoor
- Mommaipally
- Palem
- Polepally
- Salkarpet
- Shainpally
- Vasanthapur
- Vaddemaan (Nandi Vaddemaan)
- Vattem
- Velgonda
