= Achampet, Nagarkurnool district =

Achampet
- Town
- Location in Telangana, India Achampet (India)
- Coordinates: 16.3990°N 78.6370°E
- Country: India
- State: Telangana
- District: Nagarkurnool
- Elevation: 78.73 m (258.3 ft)

Population (2011)
  - Total: 20,721

Languages
  - Official: Telugu
- Time zone: UTC+5:30 (IST)
- PIN: 509375
- Telephone code: 08541
- ISO 3166 code: IN-TG
- Vehicle registration: TS
- Nearest airport: Hyderabad
- Lok Sabha constituency: Nagarkurnool
- Vidhan Sabha constituency: Achampeta
- Website: www.achampeta.com

Achampet is a town and municipality in Nagarkurnool district of the Indian state of Telangana. The town is a revenue division headquarters. Achampet is located in the foothills of the Nallamala Forest.

== History ==
Achampet was under the rule of the Zamindars for many years. These nobles also ruled nearby villages including Devadarikunta, Lingotam, Telkapally and Chepur. After the people won their independence from the Nizam.

Inscriptions suggest that a female ruler named Achamamba hailed from the Kolhpur Village. According to legend, she came to a deep forest and fought the General of Aurangzeb (now Delhi Sultan) and Malik Kafur in a tribal war. To honor her, the village was named Achampeta. The name was later changed to Chama Gadda and then Achampet.

Achampet is located near Srisailam.

Achampet was named a Revenue Division of Nagarkurnool district

== Temples ==
Umamaheshwaram
maddimadugu

== Notable people ==
- Vennu Mallesh (born 1984) – singer on the internet.
