= Charakonda =

Mandal in Nagarkurnool District, Telangana, India

Charakonda is a mandal (district sub-division) in the Nagarkurnool District in the Indian state of Telangana. The district and its subdivisions were created by the Telangana government in 2016 as part of a reorganization of the state's districts, mandals and revenue divisions; prior to that the region encompassed by the newly formed Charakonda mandal were included in the Mahbubnagar district.

== Villages ==
 CHARAKONDA 

1. Borabanda thanda
2. Thimmaipally
3. Kamalpur
4. Jupally
5. Gokaram
6. Seriappareddipally
7. Thurkalapally
8. Marripally
9. Sirsangandla

== Geography ==
Charakonda is located at 16°44′N 77°30′E (16.73° N, 77.5° E). It has an average elevation of 431 metres (1,414 feet).

== Notable people ==
- B. Venkateshwarlu Film Director, Writer, Journalist & Businessman
- Indira Shoban activist
