= Dhundhubhi River =

Road on Dhundhubhi River towards Rama Giri Temple

Dhundhubhi River view from Rama Giri Temple

The Dhundhubhi River is a part of the Krishna River located in Telangana. Dhundhubhi river passes through Raghupathi pet village, Kalwakurhty, NagarKurnool District in Telangana, India.

In June 2020, the local MLA, Marri Janardhan Reddy, laid the foundation for a check dam at Papagal village, Thadur mandal, to be built at a cost of Rs. 6.12 crores. The river is in spate many times at Thadur mandal. Kodgal and Lingampet villages in Jadcherla mandal offered prayers to the god in thanksgiving in July 2023, after heavy rains filled the Dhundhubhi river facilitating the agricultural activity in the region.

Rama Giri temple is located near the river attracts devotees every year.
