= Telkapalle =

Telkapally తెల్కపల్లి
- mandal
- Location in Telangana, India Telkapally (India)
- Coordinates: 16.4500°N 78.4667°E
- Country: India
- State: Telangana
- District: Nagarkurnool
- Elevation: 425 m (1,394 ft)

Languages
  - Official: Telugu
- Time zone: UTC+5:30 (IST)
- Postal code: 509385
- Vehicle registration: TS 31 X XXXX
- Climate: hot (Köppen)
- Website: telangana.gov.in

Telkapally or Telkapally is a mandal in Nagarkurnool district in the state of Telangana, India.

== Geography ==
Telkapalli is located at 16.4500°N 78.4667°E. It has an average elevation of 425 metres (1397 ft).

== Institutions ==
- Siddhartha Vidyalayam
- Chaitanya Bharati Model School
- C. Laxma Reddy Cooperative Junior College
- Govardhan Reddy Junior College
- Vijaya Bank
- APGVB Telkapally, Peddur
- State Bank of India
- K.K Reddy school
- Shanthinikethan school
- S R model school

== Business ==
Animal trade fair. Especially cows and Buffaloes. Sri Rama Iron and Hardware, Telkapally. Bhavya Jewellery - Telkapally.

== Villages ==
The villages in Telkapalle mandal are

- Alair
- Ananthasagar
- Boppally
- Chinamuddunur
- Daspally
- Gaddampally
- Gatturavipakula
- Gattunellikuduru
- Golagundam
- Gouraram
- Kammareddypally
- Goureddypally
- Gouthampally

- Karvanga
- Laknaram
- Nadigadda
- Peddapally
- Peddur
- Rakonda
- Thallapally
- Vattipally
- Zamistapur
