= Talakondapally =

Talakondapally Thalakondapally
- Mandal
- Nickname: TK Pally
- Location within Telangana Location within India
- Coordinates: 16°52′N 78°25′E
- Country: India
- State: Telangana
- District: Ranga Reddy

Languages
  - Official: Telugu
- Time zone: UTC+5:30 (IST)
- Postal code: 509321
- Vehicle registration: TG 07
- Climate: hot (Köppen)
- Website: telangana.gov.in

Talakondapally is a mandal in Ranga Reddy district, Telangana, India.

== Education ==
- K.G.G.B.V. High School
- Akshara School of Excellence founded by Akshara Educational and Cultural Society

== Villages ==
The villages in Talakondapally mandal include:

- Antharam, Talakondapally
- Chandradana
- Cheepunuthala
- Chowder Pally, Talakondapally
- Chukkapur
- Gattu Ippalapally
- Jangareddy Pally
- Julapally
- Khanapur, Talakondapally
- Lingaraopally
- Medakpally
- Nayamatapoor
- Padakal, (It has famous historical Sri Venkateswara Swami Temple)
- RamaKrishnaPuram
- Rampur, Talakondapally
- Salarpur, Talakondapally
- Sangaya Pally / Sangai Palle
- Talakondapally
- Veljala
- Venkatraopeta
