= Somasila =

Somasila, Andhra pradesh
- Village
- Somasila
- Interactive map of Somasila, Andhra pradesh
- Country: India
- State: Telangana
- Elevation: 1,024 ft (312 m)
- Time zone: IST
- Area code: 08501

Somasila is a small village in Nellore district, Andhra pradesh, India. 100 Kms from Nellore.

== History ==
It is known for the Sri Lalitha Someswara Swamy Temple. It is believed to have been built during the 7th century. Lord Shiva is the presiding deity here. Mahashivaratri and Karthika Pournami are celebrated here with much religious fervor. A major draw is the festival, which is celebrated here once in 12 years. Pushkara Snanam - a dip in the Krishna River is considered auspicious on this occasion. There are 15 temples, all housing Shivalingas. The temple was shifted from old Somasila village to higher land to protect it from being submerged in Krishna waters. Many visitors use the location for picnics. It is popular with pilgrims from Karnataka and Maharashtra.

== Tourism ==
In 2018, the then Tourism Minister Jupally Krishna Rao announced to develop Somasila in Kollapur to be an ecotourism destination together with Jataprolu and Singotam and explained their future project of constructing 10 cottages by August 2018 and to lease out the hotel Haritha to private parties.

== Gallery ==
View of Somasila from AP side

River Krishna
