= Gurka Jaipal Yadav =

Indian politician

Member of the Telangana Legislative Assembly
- In office 2018–2023
- Constituency: Kalwakurthy

Member of the Andhra Pradesh Legislative Assembly
- In office 2009–2014
- Constituency: Kalwakurthy
- In office 1999–2004
- Constituency: Kalwakurthy

Personal details
- Party: Telangana Rashtra Samithi
- Other political affiliations: Telugu Desam Party
- Education: Ram Chandra College,Osmania University

Gurka Jaipal Yadav is a member of the Telangana Legislative Assembly representing Kalwakurthy constituency. He belongs to the Telangana Rashtra Samithi party.
