= Veldanda =

- mandal
- Country: India
- State: Telangana
- District: Nagarkurnool

Languages
  - Official: Telugu
- Time zone: UTC+5:30 (IST)
- PIN: 509360
- Telephone code: 08549
- Vehicle registration: TS31
- Climate: moderate (Köppen)

Veldanda is a Mandal in Nagarkurnool, Telangana, India.

== Mandal Parishath ==
Duration	Name of M.P.P	Party affiliation
2014-Incumbent	Koppu Rajasekhar	Telangana Rashtra Samithi

== ZPTC member ==
Duration	Name of ZPTC	Party affiliation
2019-Incumbent	Dr. Dyapa Vijitha Reddy, ||Bharat Rashtra Samithi	

== Institutions ==
- Primary School
- Girls Upper Primary School
- Zilla Parishad High School for Girls
- Zilla Parishad High School
- Government Junior College

== Villages ==
The villages in Veldanda mandal include:

- Ajilapur
- Bhairapoor
- Bollampally
- Chandrayanpalle
- Chedurvalli
- Cherkur
- Chokkanapally
- Chowderpally
- Gokaram
- Jupally
- Kotra
- Kuppagandla
- Peddapur
- Pothepalle
- Rachur
- Sheriappareddipalle
- Thandra
- Veldanda
- Lingareddypally
- Konetivada
- Gundala
- bandonipally
- Kantonipally
- Challapally
- Ankamonikunta
- Narayanapur
- Raghaipally
- Thimmanonipally
- Buddonipally
- Kareevanipally
- Erravally
