= Nallamala Forest =

Forest in Andhra Pradesh and Telangana

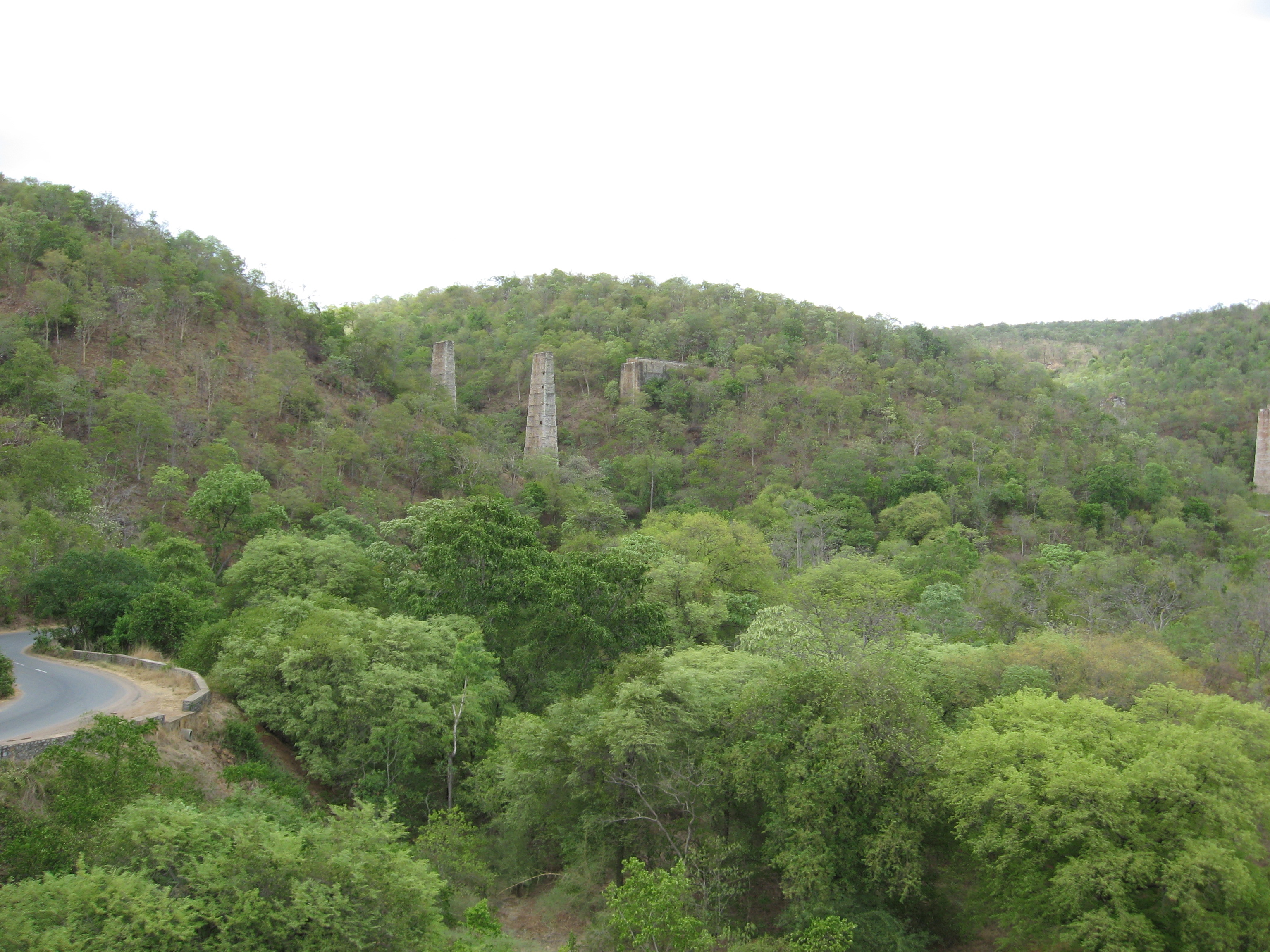

Geography
- Location: Andhra Pradesh and Telangana, India
- Coordinates

Nallamala Forest is located in the Indian states of Andhra Pradesh and Telangana. It is part of the Eastern Ghats. Nagarjunsagar-Srisailam Tiger Reserve is the largest tiger reserve in India and is spread across districts of Nandyal, Kadapa, Markapuram, Palnadu, Nalgonda, and Nagarkurnool.

== Etymology ==
In Telugu, nallamala means "black hills".

== See also ==
- Nallamala Hills
