= Kalwakurthy =

- Town
- Nickname: Town of Quartz
- Location in Telangana, India Kalwakurthy (India)
- Coordinates: 16.65°N 78.48°E
- Country: India
- State: Telangana
- District: Nagarkurnool
- Talukas: Kalwakurthy

Government
  - Type: Telangana
- Elevation: 16 m (52 ft)

Population (2011)
  - Total: 30,091
- Time zone: UTC+5:30 (IST)
- PIN: 509324
- Telephone code: 08549
- Vehicle registration: TS31

Kalwakurthy is a town and revenue division in Telangana state, India. It is the largest town in Nagarkurnool district geographically by area. And also it is one of the major cities in combined Mahabubnagar district. The name of the city is derived from the word "Kavula Keerti" which means " The Pride of Poets". It was earlier known for its cultural heritage and poetical literature. It was once known for the presence of various poets. It is located 75 kms from Hyderabad on the Srisailam highway and on new highway from Hyderabad to Tirupati as well as on the Kodada to Jadcherla highway.It is around 31.7 km from the district headquarters of Nagarkurnool. Kalwakurthy has been a developing city with educational institutions, hospitals and other infrastructural facilities. The city of Kalwakurthy has well developed transportation facilities connecting to all major surrounded cities and towns.

== Demographics ==
According to The Imperial Gazetteer of India, Kalvakurti was a taluk in Mahbubnagar district, Hyderabad State. It contained 101 villages with an area of 583 square miles. The population in 1901 was 54,384 compared with 52,132 in 1891. The headquarters Kalwakurthy had a population of 2,230.

Kalwakurthy town has a population of more than 50,000 as per the current estimations and may cross the count of 60,000 by the year 2029. People often visit Kalwakurthy from various villages and towns to taste the famous Mysore Bajji of Kalwakurthy style available only evening time. The city is famous for its flavoured raw mutton and people from Hyderabad and other cities prefer to buy mutton from Kalwakurthy.

SR No	Village Name	Village Code
1	Bekkara	575584
2	Gundur	575590
3	Jeedipalle	575578
4	Jillella	575581
5	Kalwakurthy (CT)	575593
6	Kurmidda	575579
7	Lingasanipalle	575591
8	Marchal	575580
9	Mukural	575589
10	Panjugul	575587
11	Raghupathipeta	575592
12	Suddakal	575586
13	Tharnikal	575582
14	Thotapalle	575583
15	Velkatta	575576
16	Venkatapoor (Patti Maligara)	575577
17	Vepur	575585
18	Yellikal	575588
19	Thandra	509324
20	Jangareddy pally	509324
21	Thurkalapally	509324

== Kalwakurthy Mandal data as per Census 2011 Year ==
Total Rural Population 15000

Total Urban Population 36,035

== Politics ==
The assembly constituency is spread among three districts namely Ranga Reddy, Nagarkurnool and Mahabubnagar. Hyderabad state First elected Chief Minister Burgula Ramakrishna Rao was born in Padakallu village of Kalwakurthy Taluka. The city of Kalwakurthy stands for diversed, diverged and unexpected political verdicts in elections. Current MLA is Kasi Reddy Narayan Reddy. Kalwakurthy is a political home town for well known personalities like S.Jaipal Reddy, A.Revanth Reddy, Y.Kishta Reddy and others. Dr Chetamoni Pradeep Chandra Yadav alias agni is from this place.

== Local Politics ==
Duration	Name of ZPTC	Party affiliation
2019-Incumbent	Pothuganti Bharath Prasad, ||Telangana Rashtra Samithi	TRS

== Transport ==
The National Highway 765 passes through the village, which connects Hyderabad and Tokapalle road of Andhra Pradesh. National Highway 167 also passes through the mid of the town which connects between Kodad and Jadcherla. The new highway from Hyderabad to Tirupathi connects the city of Kalwakurthy. The city connects to 3 different highways.

Kalwakurthy is located just 65 kilometres from Rajiv Gandhi International Airport, Hyderabad.

Kalwakurthy has TSRTC bus depot which runs various types of buses to different places like Hyderabad, Mahabubnagar, Nagarkurnool, Srisailam, Guntur, Vijayawada, Miryalaguda, Kodada, Zaheerabad, Sangareddy etc..
