= Nagarkurnool district =

- District of Telangana
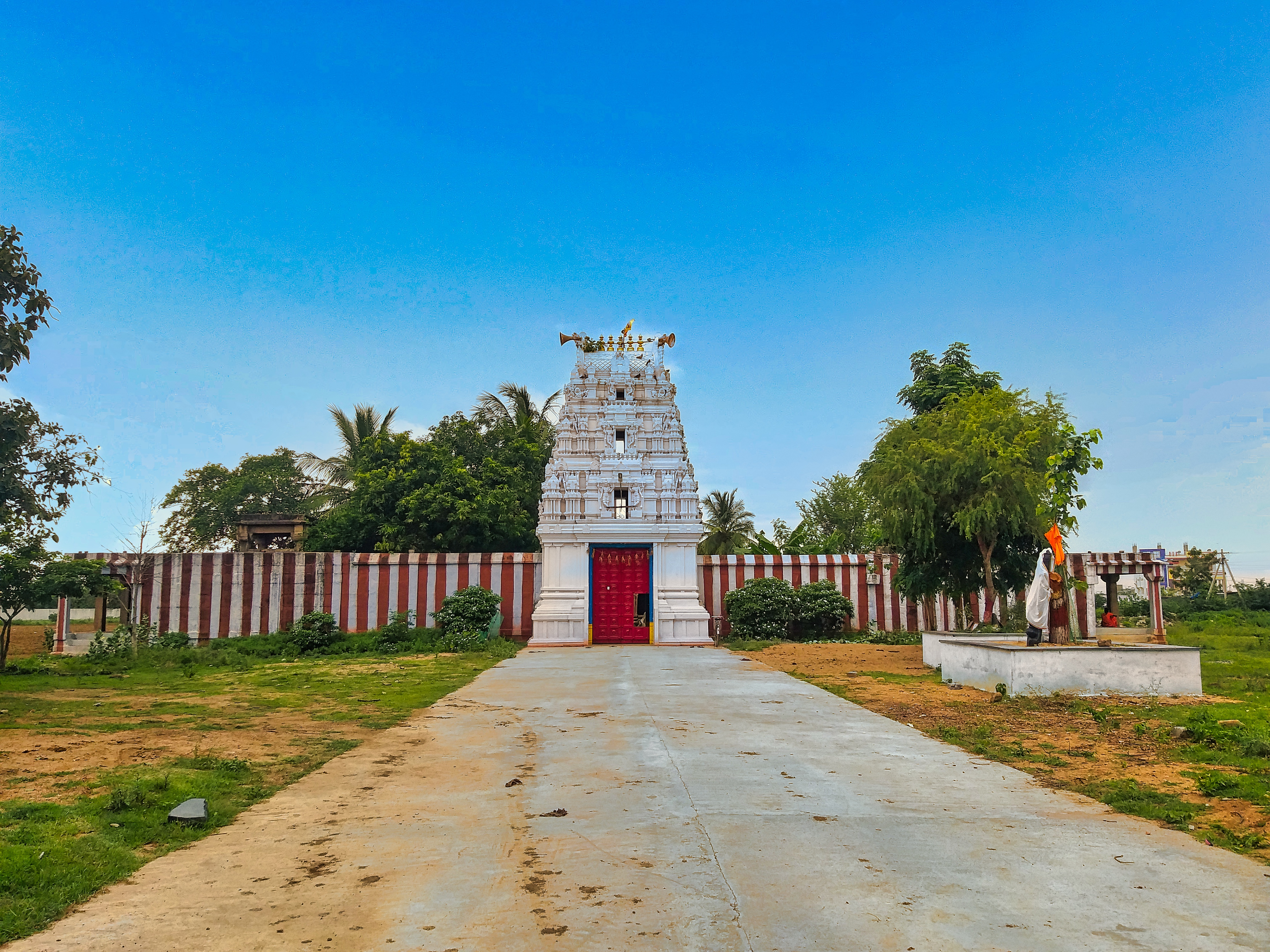
- Madhava Swamy Temple, Kollapur

- Location in Telangana
- Nagarkurnool district
- Country: India
- State: Telangana
- Division: 4
- Headquarters: Nagarkurnool
- Mandalas: 22

Government
  - District collector: Sri P Uaday Kumar IAS
  - Parliament constituencies: 1 (Nagarkurnool)
  - Assembly constituencies: 4(Nagarkurnool, Achchampet, Kalwakurthy, kollapur)

Area
  - Total: 6,924 km^{2} (2,673 sq mi)

Population (2011)
  - Total: 861,766
  - Density: 124.5/km^{2} (322.4/sq mi)

Demographics
  - Literacy: 54.38
  - Sex ratio: 968:1000
- Time zone: UTC+05:30 (IST)
- Vehicle registration: TG–31
- Website: nagarkurnool.telangana.gov.in

Nagarkurnool district is a district in the southern region of the Indian state of Telangana. The town of Nagarkurnool is the district headquarters. The district shares boundaries with Nalgonda, Rangareddy, Mahabubnagar, Wanaparthy districts and with the state boundary of Andhra Pradesh.

== History ==
The Nagarkurnool district is historically, traditionally ruled by several empires in past. The evidence of monuments and inscriptions found near confluence of rivers Krishna River and Tungabhadra River reveals that it was an inhabited place since the Stone Age. Many places of this district have legendary history. The history of the district is divided into four periods, from Badami Chalukya till the Muslim invasion. Gona Ganna Reddy ruled Nandi vardhamana puram by making capital. Its near Village of Nagarkurnool. Gona Ganna Reddy was the secret agent of Rani Rudrama Devi.

Early Western Chalukya period lasting from about A.D. 535 to about A.D.757. Rastrakuta period from A.D. 757 to A.D.973, and Eruva cholas also ruled. The River Krishna was southern boundary for Kakatiya Empire and later was under Deccan sultanates.

== Geography ==
The district is spread over an area of 6,545.00 square kilometres (2,527.04 sq mi). It is the 3rd largest district by area.

== Geography and climate ==
Nagarkurnool is located at 18.0°N 79.58°E. It has an average elevation of 458 metres (1503 feet).It is settled in the central Deccan Plateau and northern part of Nallamalla Hills made up of granite rocks and hill formations. Most of the region is occupied by Deccan thorn scrub forests and Central Deccan Plateau dry deciduous forests towards the southern region of the district. The region falls under semi arid climate which left the region barren making the cultivation dependent on seasonal rainfall. Krishna river flows from southern border of district and additionally the district has many interlinked chains of lakes and ponds that drain into "Dindubi" river. Located in the semi-arid region of Telangana, Nagarkurnool has a predominantly hot and dry climate. Summer starts in March, and peak in May with average high temperatures in the 42 °C (108 °F) range. The monsoon arrives in June and lasts until September with about 550 mm (22 in) of precipitation. A dry, mild winter starts in October and lasts until early February, when there is little humidity and average temperatures in the 22–23 °C (72–73 °F) range. Many hill rocks and lakes are located throughout district.

== Demographics ==
Religion in Nagarkurnool district (2011)
Hinduism	93.16%
Islam	5.70%
Christianity	0.44%
Other or not stated	0.70%

As per the 2011 Census of India, Nagarkurnool district had a population of 861,766, of which 107,459 (12.47%) were children under the age of six. The district recorded a sex ratio of 968 females per 1000 males and a literacy rate of 54.38%. A total of 87,830 people (10.19%) lived in urban areas. Scheduled Castes numbered 183,769 (21.32%) and Scheduled Tribes 106,880 (12.40%).

The population of the district increased from 772,807 in 2001 to 861,766 in 2011, marking a growth rate of 11.5% over the decade.

In terms of language, 84.32% of the population reported Telugu as their mother tongue, followed by Lambadi (9.54%) and Urdu (5.48%).

By religion, Hindus formed the majority at 93.16%, while Muslims accounted for 5.70% and Christians 0.44%; other religions or not stated comprised 0.70%.

== Administrative divisions ==
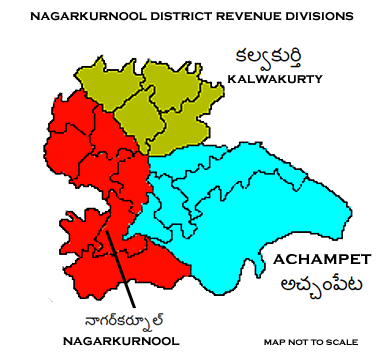
Nagarkurnool District Revenue divisions

The district has four revenue divisions of Achampet, Nagarkurnool, Kalwakurthy and Kollapur and is sub-divided into 20 mandals. Sri P Uaday Kumar IAS is the present collector of the district.

#	Mandals in District
1	Nagarkurnool
2	Tadoor
3	Pentlavelli
4	Kollapur
5	Kodair
6	Kalwakurthy
7	Urkonda
8	Charakonda
9	Vangoor
10	Veldanda
11	Achampet
12	Uppununthala
13	Amrabad
14	Bijinapalle
15	Telkapally
16	Thimmajipet
17	Peddakothapally
18	Balmoor
19	Padra
20	Lingala

== Politics ==
The district includes the Nagarkurnool (Lok Sabha constituency), which was represented in the 17th Lok Sabha by Pothuganti Ramulu of the Bharat Rashtra Samithi. In the 2024 Indian general election, Mallu Ravi of the Indian National Congress was elected from the constituency.

== Economy ==
Agriculture is the mainstay of the district economy, with a majority of the population engaged in farming and allied activities. Major crops cultivated include paddy, maize, and pulses, along with cotton and groundnut in some areas. The district also has a significant presence of horticulture, particularly mango and citrus plantations. Irrigation support is provided by projects such as the Kalwakurthy Lift Irrigation Scheme, which has improved agricultural productivity in parts of the district.

Apart from agriculture, the district’s economy includes small-scale industries such as rice mills, seed processing units, and handloom weaving. Employment in the government sector, education, and services also contributes to local livelihoods.

== Transport ==
=== Roadway ===
There are two national highways that connect the district, NH765 Hyderabad to Srisailam connects Kalwakurthy town and Mannanur village in Nallamala hills and runs through the forests of Amrabad to reach srisailam. NH167 Bellary to Kodad connects Kalwakurthy with Mahaboobnagar, Jadcherla to the west and Devarakonda towards the east. SH20 starts from Mahboobnagar connects Nagarkurnool, Achampet to join NH765 at foothills of Nallamala. A proposed new national highway 167k from Hyderabad to Nandyal is expected to connect towns of Kalwakurthy, Nagarkurnool and Kollapur with Atmakur, Nandyal in Nandyal district of Andhra Pradhesh.

The district is well connected within neighbor towns and cities by bus. TSRTC operates bus services from 4 major towns of Nagarkurnool, Kalwakurthy, Achampet and Kollapur with nearby villages and major towns such as Hyderabad, Mahabubnagar and Kurnool.

=== Railway ===
There are no railway lines in the district, the nearest railway station is Jadcherla. A proposed railway line from Gadwal to Macherla that is expected to link Nagarkurnool and Kalwakurthy towns of the district. However, the project is on due for approval for several years.

== Tourism ==
The Telangana State Tourism Development Corporation is a state government agency identified and developed several places of Interest throughout the district.

=== Religious tourism ===
- Umamaheshwaram
- Saleswaram
- Lalitha Someswara Swamy Temple
- Sri Madanagopalaswamy Temple
- Lakshmi Narasimhaswamy Temple
- Nandeeswara shaneeswara Temple
- Ramagiri Temple
- Hanuman Temple
- Shivayya Temple

=== Eco-tourism ===
The forest regions at the southern boundaries of the district are part of Nagarjunsagar-Srisailam Tiger Reserve. Telangana Tourism developed a jungle safari and trek at Farahbad forest checkpoint and river cottages at River Krishna near Eegalapenta towards Srisailam. The backwaters of Krishna river from Srisailam Reservoir at Somasila are developed under the state eco-tourism package with cottages, river cruising and trekking activities at the foothills of Nallamala.

== See also ==
- List of districts in Telangana
- Nagarkurnool (Lok Sabha constituency)
- Nagarkurnool Assembly constituency
- Mahbubnagar district
