= Nagarkurnool =

- town
- Nickname: Kandanulu
- Nagarkurnool (Telangana) Nagarkurnool (India)
- Coordinates: 16.493900°N 78.310200°E
- Country: India
- State: Telangana
- District: Nagarkurnool
- Founder: Nagana, Kandana

Area
  - Total: 4.26 km^{2} (1.64 sq mi)
- Elevation: 480 m (1,570 ft)

Population (2011)
  - Total: 26,801
  - Density: 6,290/km^{2} (16,300/sq mi)

Languages
  - Official: Telugu, Urdu
- Time zone: UTC+5:30 (IST)
- Pin: 509209
- Vehicle registration: TS 31
- Sex ratio: 1.1:1 ♂/♀

Nagarkurnool is a town and is the district headquarters of Nagarkurnool district of the Indian state of Telangana. It is located at nearly 120 km from the state capital, Hyderabad. The town has a great history and it was a district headquarter during Nizam's rule.

== History ==
Nagarkurnool has a history dating back more than 500 years. One version of the story says that Nagarkurnool was named after the Kings Nagana and Kandana, brothers who ruled the present day Nagarkurnool and surrounding area. The village Naganool (which was named after Nagana) still exists, approximately 1 km southeast of Nagarkurnool. Around 110 or 120 years ago, Nagarkurnool was a main junction for transport and district headquarters for most of the south Telangana region. Farmers traveling in this area would buy and apply kandena (grease) for their carts. This story says the name of the town comes from the name Kandanool, meaning “he who sells kandena”, which eventually became Kurnool and then Nagarkurnool.

== Transport ==
The town is well connected with major nearby towns and villages. TSRTC runs frequent buses from the town to major towns such as Achampet, Kalwakurthy, Kollapur, Mahbubnagar, Wanaparthy and the state capital, Hyderabad.

The town is geo-centric with the major towns.

== Election results ==
=== General Election, 2014 ===
2019 Indian general elections, P.Ramulu won the Nagarkurnool segment General Election, 2014:Nagarkurnool
| Party | Candidate | Votes | % | ±% |
|---|---|---|---|---|
| INC | Nandi Yellaiah | 4,20,075 | 37.88 | −3.35 |
| TRS | Manda Jagannath | 4,00,000 | 36.38 | −0.19 |
| TDP | Bakkani Narsimlu | 1,83,312 | 16.53 | |
| BSP | Bahadhur Srinivas | 12,089 | 1.08 | |
| YSRCP | Maredu Gopal | 22,985 | 2.06 | |
| Independent | Buddula Srinivas | 54,680 | 4.90 | |
| | NOTA | 12,388 | 1.11 | |
| Majority | | 16,676 | 1.50 | −3.16 |
| Turnout | | 11,08,968 | 76.36 | +6.15 |
| INC hold | | Swing | | |
