= Nagarkurnool Lok Sabha constituency =

Constituency of the Indian parliament in Telangana

Coordinates: 16.5°N 78.3°E

Nagarkurnool TG-12
- Lok Sabha constituency
- Map of Nagarkurnool Constituency in Telangana

Constituency details
- Country: India
- Region: South India
- State: Telangana
- Assembly constituencies: Wanaparthy; Gadwal; Alampur; Nagarkurnool; Achampet; Kalwakurthy; Kollapur
- Established: 1967
- Total electors: 1,477,338
- Reservation: SC

Member of Parliament
- 18th Lok Sabha
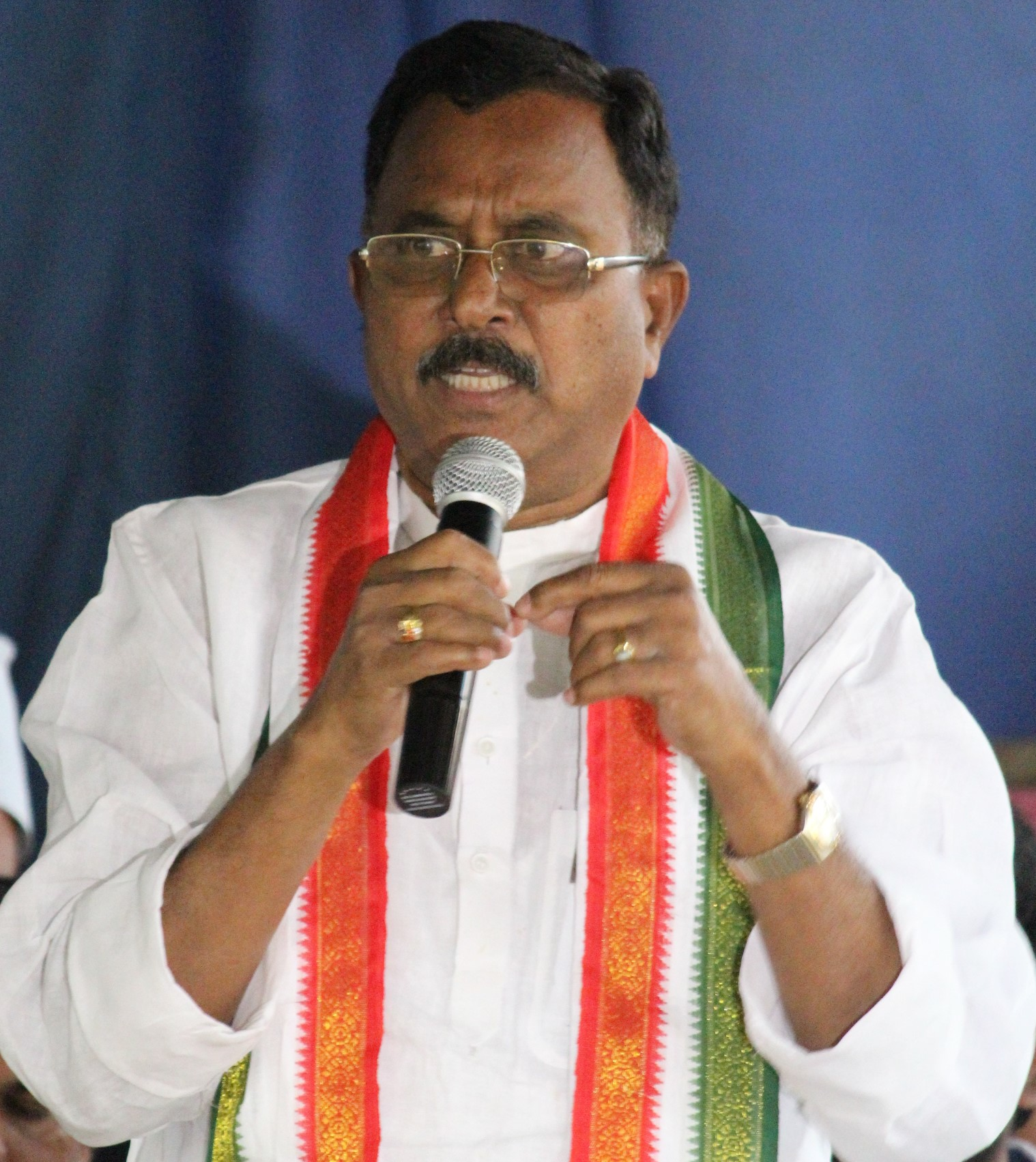
- Incumbent Mallu Ravi
- Party: INC
- Elected year: 2024

Nagarkurnool Lok Sabha constituency is one of the 17 Lok Sabha (Lower House of the Parliament) constituencies in Telangana state in southern India. This constituency is reserved for the candidates belonging to the Scheduled castes.

== Assembly segments ==
Nagarkurnool Lok Sabha constituency presently comprises the following Legislative Assembly segments:

No	Name	District	Member	Party	Leading (in 2024)
78	Wanaparthy	Wanaparthy	Tudi Megha Reddy	INC	INC
79	Gadwal	Jogulamba Gadwal	Bandla Krishna Mohan Reddy	BRS	BJP
80	Alampur (SC)	Jogulamba Gadwal	Vijayudu	BRS	INC
81	Nagarkurnool	Nagarkurnool	Dr. Kuchkulla Rajesh Reddy	INC	INC
82	Achampet (SC)	Nagarkurnool	Chikkudu Vamshi Krishna	INC	INC
83	Kalwakurthy	Nagarkurnool	Kasireddy Narayan Reddy	INC	INC
85	Kollapur	Nagarkurnool	Jupally Krishna Rao	INC	INC

== Members of Parliament ==
Year	Member	Party
Andhra Pradesh
1962	J. Rameshwar Rao	Indian National Congress
1967	J. B. Muthyal Rao	Indian National Congress
1971	M. Bheeshma Dev	Telangana Praja Samithi
1977	M. Bheeshma Dev	Indian National Congress
1980	A R Mallu	Indian National Congress
1984	V. Tulasiram	Telugu Desam Party
1989	A R Mallu	Indian National Congress
1991	Mallu Ravi	Indian National Congress
1996	Manda Jagannath	Telugu Desam Party
1998	Mallu Ravi	Indian National Congress
1999	Manda Jagannath	Telugu Desam Party
2004	Manda Jagannath	Telugu Desam Party
2009	Manda Jagannath	Indian National Congress
Telangana
2014	Nandi Yellaiah	Indian National Congress
2019	Pothuganti Ramulu	Bharat Rashtra Samithi
2024	Mallu Ravi	Indian National Congress

== Election results ==
=== General election, 2024 ===
In the 2024 Indian general election, Mallu Ravi of the Indian National Congress won the Nagarkurnool seat, defeating Bharath Prasad Pothuganti of the Bharatiya Janata Party and R. S. Praveen Kumar of the Bharat Rashtra Samithi.

2024 Indian general election: Nagarkurnool
Party	Candidate	Votes	%	±%
INC	Mallu Ravi	465,072	38.14	▲6.83
BJP	Bharath Prasad Pothuganti	370,658	30.40	▲17.37
BRS	R. S. Praveen Kumar	321,343	26.36	▼24.12
Majority		94,414		
Turnout		1,219,223	69.46	▲7.23
INC gain from BJP		Swing		

=== General election, 2019 ===
2019 Indian general elections: Nagarkurnool
Party	Candidate	Votes	%	±%
BRS	Pothuganti Ramulu	499,672	50.48	
INC	Dr. Mallu Ravi	3,09,924	31.31	
BJP	Shruthi Bangaru	1,29,021	13.03	
NOTA	None of the above	13,525	1.37	
Majority		1,89,748	19.17	
Turnout		9,89,893	62.23	
BRS gain from INC		Swing		

=== General election, 2014 ===
2014 Indian general elections: Nagarkurnool
Party	Candidate	Votes	%	±%
INC	Nandi Yellaiah	4,20,075	37.88	−3.35
BRS	Manda Jagannath	4,03,399	36.38	−0.19
TDP	Bakkani Narsimlu	1,83,312	16.53	
BSP	nenavath vamshi	12,089	1.08	
YSRCP	Maredu Gopal	22,985	2.06	
Independent	Buddula Srinivas	54,680	4.90	
NOTA	NOTA	12,388	1.11	
Majority		16,676	1.50	−3.16
Turnout		11,16,159	75.55	+5.24
INC hold		Swing		

=== General election, 2009 ===
General Election, 2009: Nagarkurnool
Party	Candidate	Votes	%	±%
INC	Manda Jagannath	4,22,745	41.23	
BRS	Guvvala Balaraju	3,74,978	36.57	
PRP	Devani Satyanarayana	62,216	6.07	
Majority		47,767	4.66	
Turnout		10,25,367	70.21	+2.12
INC gain from TDP		Swing		

=== General election, 2004 ===
General Election, 2004: Nagarkurnool
Party	Candidate	Votes	%	±%
TDP	Manda Jagannath	405,046	45.85	−7.26
Independent	K S Ratnam	305,396	34.57	
Independent	P Bhagvanthu	119,813	13.56	
BSP	P Lalaiah	27,247	3.08	
Independent	Dr G Raghavulu	25,848	2.93	
Majority		99,650	11.28	+3.04
Turnout		883,350	68.16	−1.36
TDP hold		Swing	-7.26	

== See also ==
- Mahbubnagar district
- List of constituencies of the Lok Sabha
