= Alampur Assembly constituency =

Constituency of the Telangana legislative assembly in India

Coordinates: 15.88°N 78.13°E

Alampur
- Constituency No. 80 for the Telangana Legislative Assembly
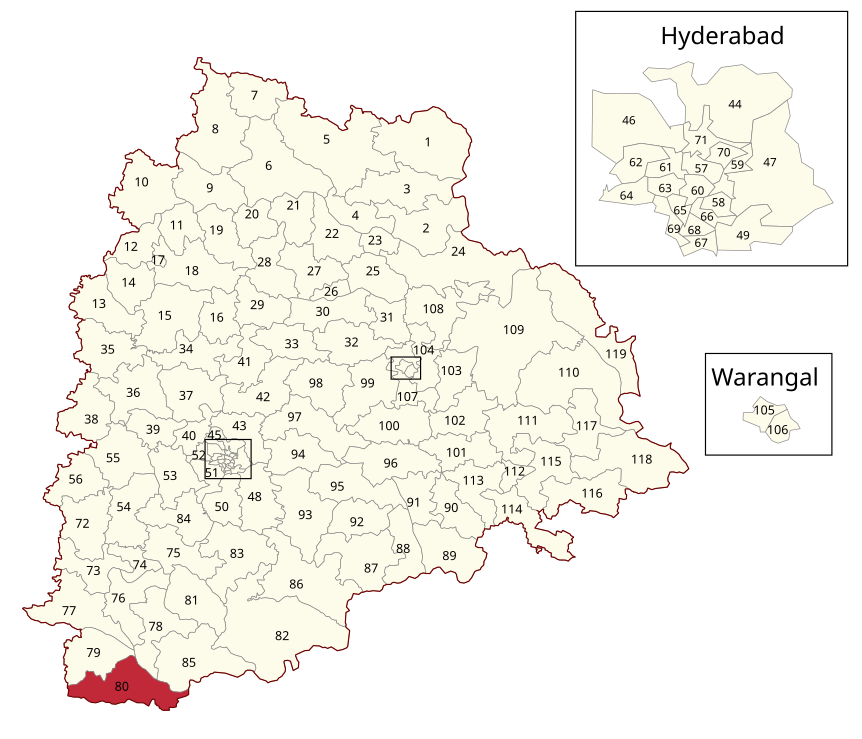
- Location of Alampur Assembly constituency within Telangana

Constituency details
- Country: India
- Region: South India
- State: Telangana
- District: Jogulamba Gadwal
- Lok Sabha constituency: Nagarkurnool
- Established: 1951
- Total electors: 2,04,788
- Reservation: SC

Member of Legislative Assembly
- 3rd Telangana Legislative Assembly
- Incumbent Vijayudu
- Party: Bharat Rashtra Samithi
- Elected year: 2023

Alampur Assembly constituency is a constituency of Telangana Legislative Assembly, India. It is one of 14 constituencies in Ertswhile Mahbubnagar district , now it is a part of Jogulamba Gadwal district. It is part of Nagarkurnool Lok Sabha constituency.

Vijayudu of Telangana Rashtra Samithi has been representing the constituency since 2023.

== Mandals ==
The current Assembly Constituency comprises the following Mandals:

Mandal
Alampur
Ieeja
Itikyal
Waddepalle
Manopad
Rajoli
Undavelly

== Members of the Legislative Assembly ==
Election	Member	Party
1952	Naganna Kalavandla	Indian National Congress
1957	Jayalaxmi Devamma	Indian National Congress
1962	D. Muralidhar Reddy	Indian National Congress
1967	T. Chandrasekhara Reddy	Indian National Congress
1972	T. Chandrasekhara Reddy	Indian National Congress
1978	Ram Bhupal Reddy	Janata Party
1983	Rajini Babu	Independent politician
1985	Ravula Ravindranath Reddy	Bharatiya Janata Party
1989	Ravula Ravindranath Reddy	Bharatiya Janata Party
1994	Kothakota Prakash Reddy	Telugu Desam Party
1999	Ravula Ravindranath Reddy	Bharatiya Janata Party
2004	Challa Venkatrami Reddy	Independent politician
2009	V. M. Abraham	Indian National Congress
2014	S. A. Sampath Kumar	Indian National Congress
2018	V. M. Abraham	Telangana Rashtra Samithi
2023	Vijayudu	Bharat Rashtra Samithi

Hyderabad State
Andhra Pradesh

== Election results ==
=== Assembly Election 2023 ===
2023 Telangana Legislative Assembly election : Alampur
Party	Candidate	Votes	%	±%
BRS	Vijayudu	104,060	52.88%	New
INC	S. A. Sampath Kumar	73,487	37.34%	▲4.75
BSP	Dr. R. Prasanna Kumar	6,082	3.09%	▲2.48
BJP	Rajagopal Perumallu	4,711	2.39%	▲1.27
NOTA	None of the above	2,013	1.02%	▼0.96
Independent	Beesanna	1,263	0.64%	New
Margin of victory		30,573	15.54%	▼9.82
Turnout		197,688	83.06%	▲0.33
Total valid votes		196,797		
Registered electors		237,997		▲9.49
BRS gain from BRS		Swing	▼5.07	

=== Assembly Election 2018 ===
2018 Telangana Legislative Assembly election : Alampur
Party	Candidate	Votes	%	±%
BRS	V. M. Abraham	102,105	57.95%	▲33.72
INC	S. A. Sampath Kumar	57,426	32.59%	▼3.89
SFB	Harijana Abraham	8,803	5.00%	New
NOTA	None of the above	3,490	1.98%	▲1.37
BJP	B. Rajini	1,965	1.12%	New
BSP	B. Hussain	1,066	0.61%	▼0.58
Margin of victory		44,679	25.36%	▲21.08
Turnout		179,833	82.73%	▲6.89
Total valid votes		176,191		
Registered electors		217,366		▲3.46
BRS gain from INC		Swing	▲21.47	

=== Assembly Election 2014 ===
2014 Andhra Pradesh Legislative Assembly election : Alampur
Party	Candidate	Votes	%	±%
INC	S. A. Sampath Kumar	57,419	36.48%	▼1.96
TDP	V. M. Abraham	50,689	32.21%	▼5.31
BRS	Manda Sreenath	38,136	24.23%	New
Yuvajana Sramika Rythu Congress Party	Bangi Laxmanna	3,779	2.40%	New
Independent	M. Maddileti	3,519	2.24%	New
BSP	Thummala Ravi Kumar	1,866	1.19%	▲0.14
NOTA	None of the above	965	0.61%	New
Margin of victory		6,730	4.28%	▲3.37
Turnout		159,348	75.84%	▲7.22
Total valid votes		157,379		
Registered electors		210,104		▲11.33
INC hold		Swing	▼1.96	

=== Assembly Election 2009 ===
2009 Andhra Pradesh Legislative Assembly election : Alampur
Party	Candidate	Votes	%	±%
INC	V. M. Abraham	49,722	38.44%	New
TDP	Prasanna Kumar. R	48,539	37.52%	▲7.30
PRP	Surupa Shobharani	14,549	11.25%	New
Independent	Bangi Laxmanna	2,334	1.80%	New
BJP	Indira	2,215	1.71%	New
Independent	Gaganam Sekhar Budagajangam	1,702	1.32%	New
Independent	Ravinder	1,508	1.17%	New
BSP	Gaddam Balaswamy	1,356	1.05%	▼1.51
Trilinga Praja Pragati Party	T. Prasad Madiga	969	0.75%	New
Pyramid Party of India	D. Raju	966	0.75%	▼1.31
Margin of victory		1,183	0.91%	▼2.95
Turnout		129,512	68.62%	▼0.48
Total valid votes		129,361		
Registered electors		188,729		▲18.52
INC gain from Independent		Swing	▲4.36	

=== Assembly Election 2004 ===
2004 Andhra Pradesh Legislative Assembly election : Alampur
Party	Candidate	Votes	%	±%
Independent	Challa Venkatrami Reddy	37,499	34.08%	New
TDP	Vavilala Suneetha	33,252	30.22%	New
BRS	Ravula Ravindranath Reddy	28,253	25.68%	New
BSP	Boya Ganapathi Naidu	2,820	2.56%	New
Pyramid Party of India	K. Gopal Rao	2,265	2.06%	▲1.37
Independent	P. Narayana Reddy	1,831	1.66%	New
Independent	T. Ratna Kumar	1,495	1.36%	New
Margin of victory		4,247	3.86%	▼26.38
Turnout		110,038	69.10%	▲3.51
Total valid votes		110,021		
Rejected ballots		17	0.02%	▼3.33
Registered electors		159,241		▲0.91
Independent gain from BJP		Swing	▼19.48	

=== Assembly Election 1999 ===
1999 Andhra Pradesh Legislative Assembly election : Alampur
Party	Candidate	Votes	%	±%
BJP	Ravula Ravindranath Reddy	53,588	53.56%	▲27.42
INC	Kothakota Prakash Reddy	23,334	23.32%	▼9.70
Bahujan Republican Party	Sunitha	20,631	20.62%	New
Anna Telugu Desam Party	Lakshmi Reddy	1,309	1.31%	New
Pyramid Party of India	K. Gopal Rao	686	0.69%	New
Margin of victory		30,254	30.24%	▲28.21
Turnout		103,507	65.59%	▼1.10
Total valid votes		100,044		
Rejected ballots		3,463	3.35%	▲1.39
Registered electors		157,801		▲6.62
BJP gain from TDP		Swing	▲18.51	

=== Assembly Election 1994 ===
1994 Andhra Pradesh Legislative Assembly election : Alampur
Party	Candidate	Votes	%	±%
TDP	Kothakota Prakash Reddy	33,918	35.05%	New
INC	D. Vishnuvardhan Reddy	31,954	33.02%	▼10.10
BJP	R. Ravindranath Reddy	25,293	26.14%	▼28.81
BSP	Chakrapani Yadav. S	1,560	1.61%	▲0.76
Independent	Dharma Raju	1,169	1.21%	New
Independent	Rajani Babu. T	801	0.83%	New
Margin of victory		1,964	2.03%	▼9.80
Turnout		98,701	66.69%	▲0.64
Total valid votes		96,771		
Rejected ballots		1,930	1.96%	▼2.96
Registered electors		148,006		▲6.04
TDP gain from BJP		Swing	▼19.90	

=== Assembly Election 1989 ===
1989 Andhra Pradesh Legislative Assembly election : Alampur
Party	Candidate	Votes	%	±%
BJP	Ravula Ravindranath Reddy	48,167	54.95%	▲4.16
INC	Rajani Babu. T	37,795	43.12%	▲8.68
BSP	Immanial	746	0.85%	New
Independent	Madduleti	527	0.60%	New
Margin of victory		10,372	11.83%	▼4.52
Turnout		92,189	66.05%	▲0.85
Total valid votes		87,651		
Rejected ballots		4,538	4.92%	▲2.74
Registered electors		139,571		▲19.26
BJP hold		Swing	▲4.16	

=== Assembly Election 1985 ===
1985 Andhra Pradesh Legislative Assembly election : Alampur
Party	Candidate	Votes	%	±%
BJP	Ravula Ravindranath Reddy	37,910	50.79%	New
INC	B. Anasuyamma	25,709	34.44%	▼10.94
Independent	Janardhan Reddy	4,539	6.08%	New
Independent	Yellapa Naidu	3,599	4.82%	New
Independent	C. Manikya Reddy	1,081	1.45%	New
Independent	Narayana	948	1.27%	New
Independent	Mohd. Abdulraoof	508	0.68%	New
Margin of victory		12,201	16.35%	▲12.27
Turnout		76,306	65.20%	▼3.87
Total valid votes		74,643		
Rejected ballots		1,663	2.18%	▼0.73
Registered electors		117,035		▲7.88
BJP gain from Independent		Swing	▲1.33	

=== Assembly Election 1983 ===
1983 Andhra Pradesh Legislative Assembly election : Alampur
Party	Candidate	Votes	%	±%
Independent	Rajini Babu	35,979	49.46%	New
INC	T. Laxmi Sarojini Devi	33,011	45.38%	▲40.22
Independent	B. Kristanna	2,828	3.89%	New
INC(J)	Ananda Rao. S	929	1.28%	New
Margin of victory		2,968	4.08%	▲3.89
Turnout		74,925	69.07%	▼2.85
Total valid votes		72,747		
Rejected ballots		2,178	2.91%	▼0.03
Registered electors		108,484		▲13.13
Independent gain from JP		Swing	▲13.61	

=== Assembly Election 1978 ===
1978 Andhra Pradesh Legislative Assembly election : Alampur
Party	Candidate	Votes	%	±%
JP	Ram Bhupal Reddy	23,998	35.85%	New
Independent	T. Rajani Babu	23,873	35.66%	New
INC(I)	G. Govind Reddy	15,621	23.33%	New
INC	K. Balakrishna Reddy	3,453	5.16%	▼64.94
Margin of victory		125	0.19%	▼41.32
Turnout		68,971	71.92%	▲7.66
Total valid votes		66,945		
Rejected ballots		2,026	2.94%	▲2.94
Registered electors		95,896		▲11.50
JP gain from INC		Swing	▼34.25	

=== Assembly Election 1972 ===
1972 Andhra Pradesh Legislative Assembly election : Alampur
Party	Candidate	Votes	%	±%
INC	T. Chandrasekhara Reddy	37,438	70.10%	▼16.94
Independent	Srirama Reddy	15,268	28.59%	New
Independent	Krishna Reddy	697	1.31%	New
Margin of victory		22,170	41.51%	▼35.00
Turnout		55,266	64.26%	▲3.83
Total valid votes		53,403		
Registered electors		86,007		▲20.83
INC hold		Swing	▼16.94	

=== Assembly Election 1967 ===
1967 Andhra Pradesh Legislative Assembly election : Alampur
Party	Candidate	Votes	%	±%
INC	T. Chandrasekhara Reddy	35,780	87.04%	▲38.07
Independent	J. Reddy	4,330	10.53%	New
Independent	Y. G. Nagaiah	998	2.43%	New
Margin of victory		31,450	76.51%	▲76.12
Turnout		43,011	60.43%	▼9.22
Total valid votes		41,108		
Registered electors		71,179		▲12.59
INC hold		Swing	▲38.07	

=== Assembly Election 1962 ===
1962 Andhra Pradesh Legislative Assembly election : Alampur
Party	Candidate	Votes	%	±%
INC	D. Muralidhar Reddy	20,715	48.97%	▼1.18
Independent	Paga Pulla Reddy	20,548	48.58%	New
Independent	Dharma Reddy	1,035	2.45%	New
Margin of victory		167	0.39%	▲0.10
Turnout		44,034	69.65%	▲19.84
Total valid votes		42,298		
Registered electors		63,222		▲18.34
INC hold		Swing	▼1.18	

=== Assembly Election 1957 ===
1957 Andhra Pradesh Legislative Assembly election : Alampur
Party	Candidate	Votes	%	±%
INC	Jayalaxmi Devamma	13,345	50.15%	▼6.08
Independent	Janardhan Reddy	13,267	49.85%	New
Margin of victory		78	0.29%	▼5.70
Turnout		26,612	49.81%	▼28.89
Total valid votes		26,612		
Registered electors		53,424		▼47.95
INC hold		Swing	▲19.04	

=== Assembly Election 1952 ===
1952 Hyderabad State Legislative Assembly election : Alampur Gadwal
Party	Candidate	Votes	%	±%
INC	Naganna Kalavandla	25,128	31.11%	New
INC	Paga Pulla Reddy	20,293	25.12%	New
Independent	T. Chandrasekhara Reddy	15,910	19.70%	New
Independent	Jammanna	15,667	19.40%	New
Independent	Narsing Bhan Singh	3,779	4.68%	New
Margin of victory		4,835	5.99%	
Turnout		80,777	78.70%	
Total valid votes		80,777		
Registered electors		102,638		
INC win (new seat)				

== See also ==
- List of constituencies of Telangana Legislative Assembly
