= Dharur mandal, Jogulamba Gadwal district =

Dharur
- Mandal

Dharur (Telugu:ధరూర్ మండలం(జోగులాంబ గద్వాల)) is a mandal in Jogulamba Gadwal district, Telangana.

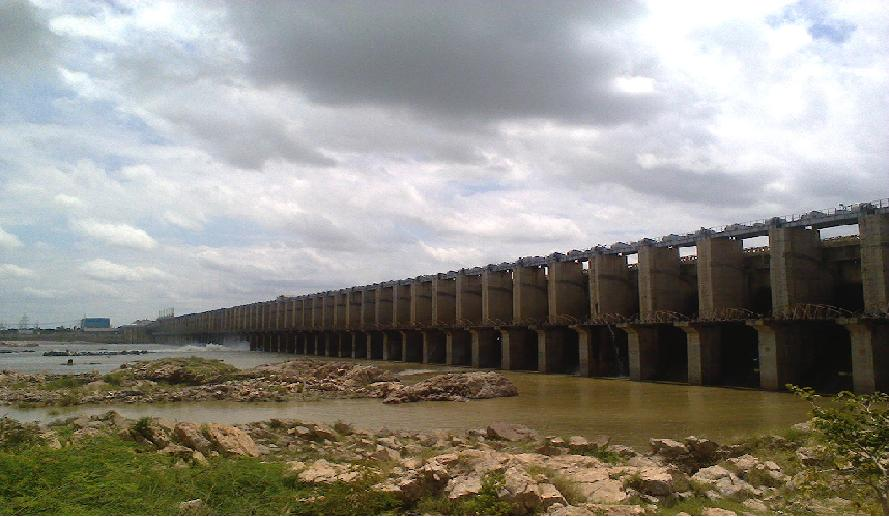
Priyadarshini jurala project

== Surrounding mandals ==
Gadwal, Maldakal, Ghattu, Narva and Raichur District of Karnataka

== Political views ==
Sathyaram Madhan Mohan Reddy supports the Congress Party.

== Gallery ==
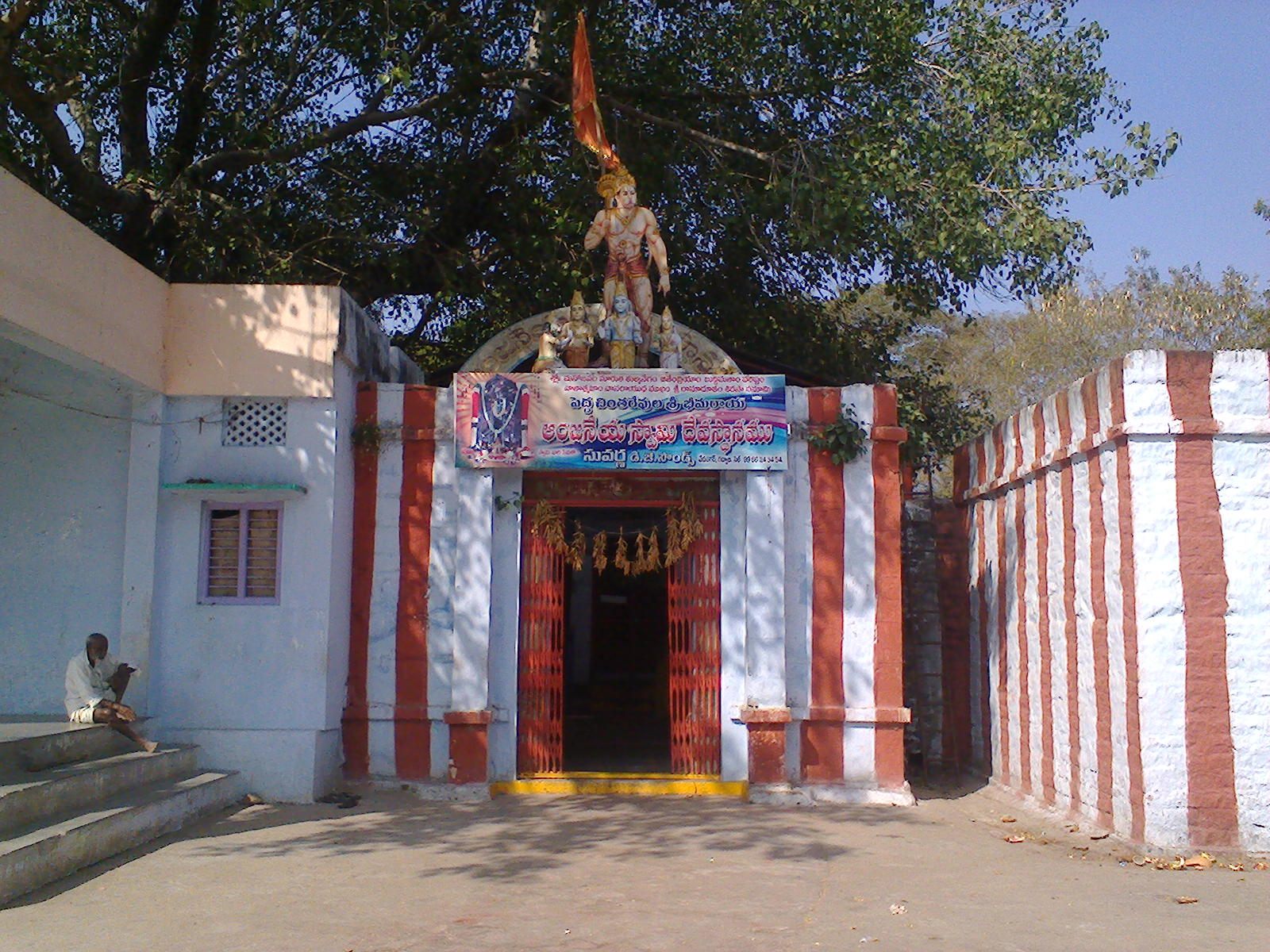
Chintarevula temple

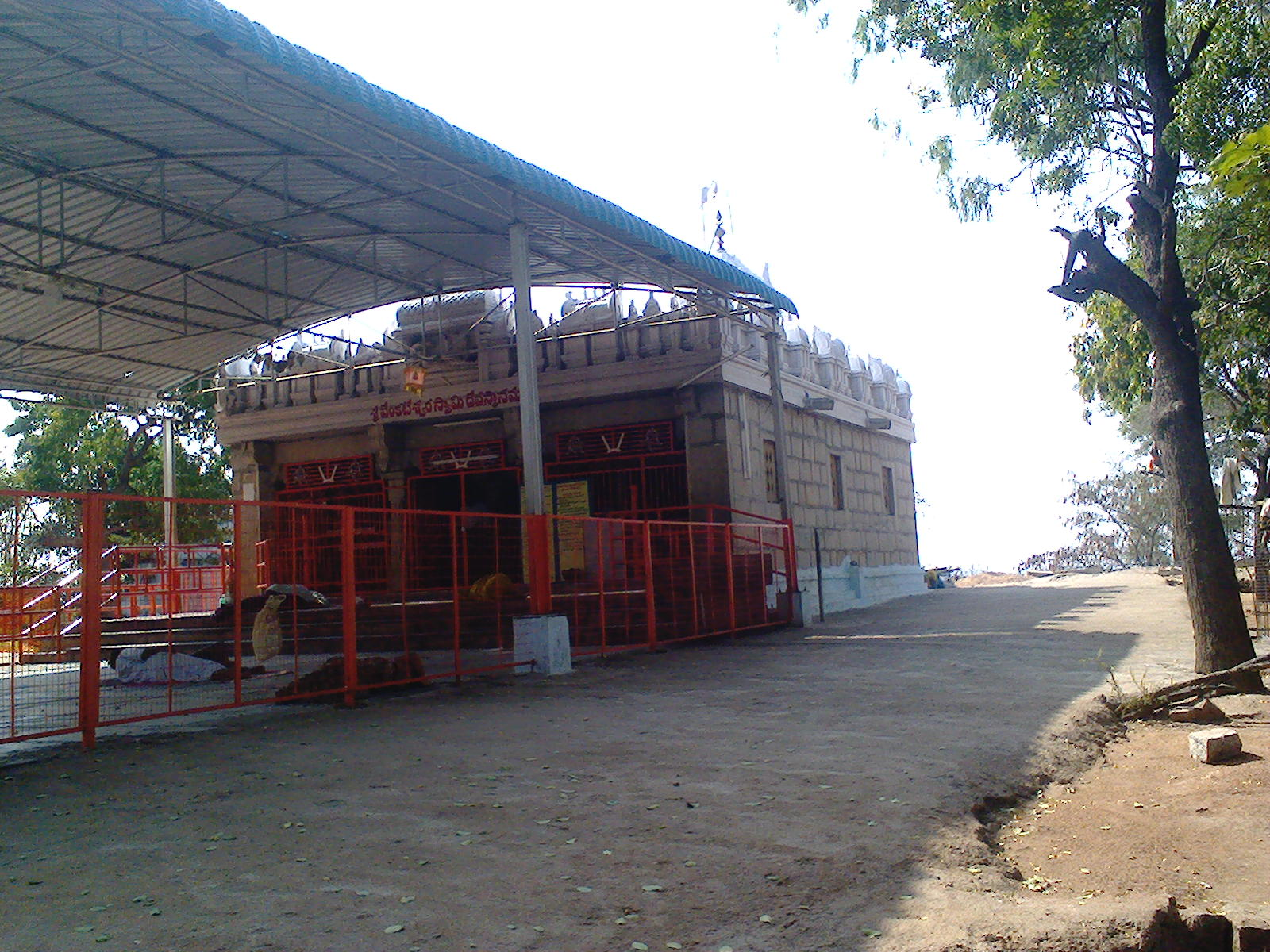
Venkateswara Temple

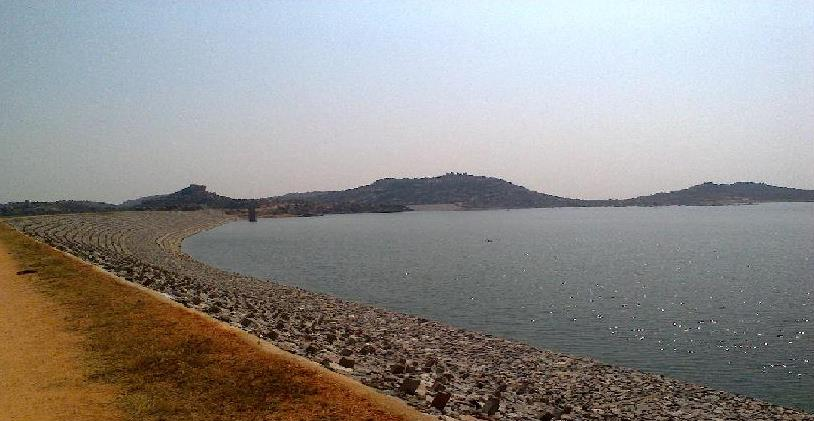
Ryalampad reservoir
