= S. A. Sampath Kumar =

Indian politician

S. A. Sampath Kumar (born 20 June 1972) is an Indian politician from Telangana state. He was a former member of the Telangana Legislative Assembly from Alampur Assembly constituency, which is reserved for Scheduled Caste community, in Mahabubnagar district representing the Indian National Congress Party.

== Early life ==
Kumar is from Chinna Tandrapadu village, Leeza mandal, Mahabubnagar district, Telangana state. He is the son of Anand Rao and K. T. Lushamma. He completed his Ph.D. in business management at Osmania University, Hyderabad in 2016. Earlier, he completed his M.B.A. at College of Commerce and Business Management, Osmania University in 1995 and B.Ed. in 1993. He obtained a B.Sc. degree from M.V.S Degree College, Mahabubnagar in 1992. He declared assets worth Rs.2 crore in his affidavit to the Election Commission of India.

== Career ==
Kumar won from Alampur Assembly constituency in the 2014 Andhra Pradesh Legislative Assembly election representing the Indian National Congress. he polled 57,419 votes and defeated his nearest rival, V. M. Abraham of the Telugu Desam Party, by a margin of 6,730 votes. He contested again on the Congress ticket in the 2018 Telangana Legislative Assembly election but lost to Abraham who contested this time on BRS ticket, by a margin of 44,679 votes. In the 2023 Telangana Legislative Assembly election, he polled 73,487 votes but lost to Vijayudu, also of BRS, by a margin of 30,573 votes.
