= Achampet Assembly constituency =

Constituency of the Telangana legislative assembly in India

Coordinates: 16.40°N 78.64°E

Achampet
- Constituency No. 82 for the Telangana Legislative Assembly
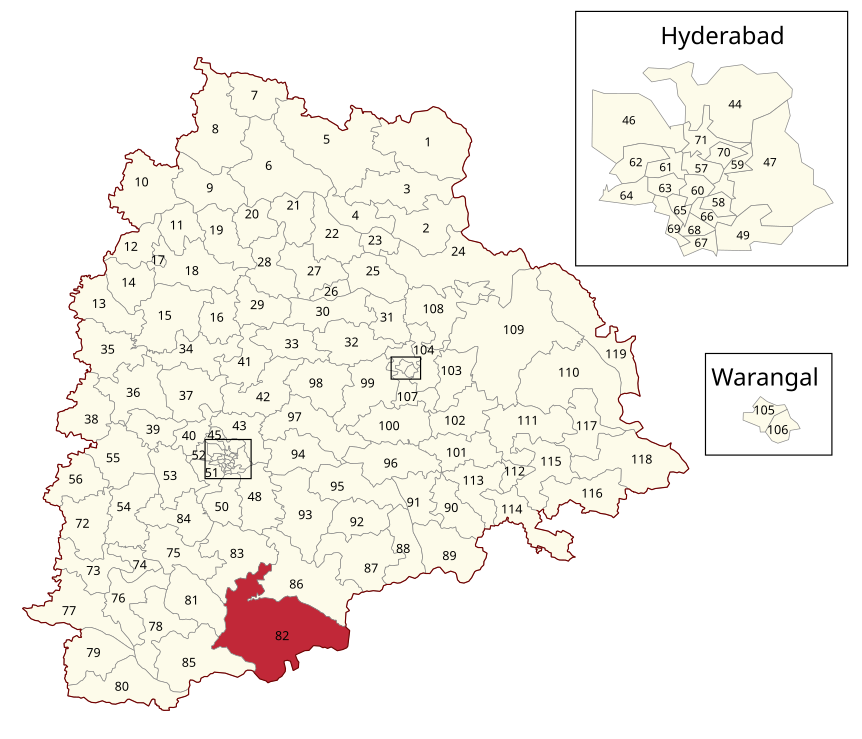
- Location of Achampet Assembly constituency within Telangana

Constituency details
- Country: India
- Region: South India
- State: Telangana
- District: Naagarkurnool
- Lok Sabha constituency: Nagarkurnool
- Total electors: 2,00,056
- Reservation: SC

Member of Legislative Assembly
- 3rd Telangana Legislative Assembly
- Incumbent Chikkudu Vamshi Krishna
- Party: Indian National Congress
- Elected year: 2023

Achampet Assembly constituency is an SC (Scheduled Caste) reserved constituency of the Telangana Legislative Assembly in India. It is one of four constituencies in the Nagarkurnool district of Telangana. It is part of the Nagarkurnool Lok Sabha constituency.

Chikkudu Vamshi Krishna of Indian National Congress is the MLA from the constituency.

== Mandals ==
The Assembly Constituency presently comprises the following Mandals:

Mandal
Achampet
Balmoor
Lingal
Amrabad
Uppununthala
Vangoor
Padara
Chara konda

== Members of the Legislative Assembly ==
| Election | Member | Party |
|---|---|---|
| 1962 | K. Naganna | Indian National Congress |
| 1967 | Puttapaga Mahendranath | Indian National Congress |
| 1972 | Puttapaga Mahendranath | Indian National Congress |
| 1978 | R. M. Manohar | Indian National Congress |
| 1983 | Puttapaga Mahendranath | Independent politician |
| 1985 | Puttapaga Mahendranath | Telugu Desam Party |
| 1989 | D. Kiran Kumar | Indian National Congress |
| 1994 | Pothuganti Ramulu | Telugu Desam Party |
| 1999 | Pothuganti Ramulu | Telugu Desam Party |
| 2004 | Dr. Chikkudu Vamshi Krishna | Indian National Congress |
| 2009 | Pothuganti Ramulu | Telugu Desam Party |
| 2014 | Guvvala Balaraju | Bharat Rashtra Samithi |
| 2018 | Guvvala Balaraju | Bharat Rashtra Samithi |
| 2023 | Dr. Chikkudu Vamshi Krishna | Indian National Congress |

== Election results ==
=== Assembly Election 2023 ===
2023 Telangana Legislative Assembly election : Achampet
| Party | Candidate | Votes | % | ±% |
|---|---|---|---|---|
| INC | Dr. Chikkudu Vamshi Krishna | 115,337 | 58.96% | ▲13.68 |
| BRS | Guvvala Balaraju | 66,011 | 33.74% | New |
| BJP | Devani Satish Madiga | 4,267 | 2.18% | ▲0.33 |
| NOTA | None of the above | 2,833 | 1.45% | ▲0.06 |
| Independent | Bejavada Ravikumar | 2,684 | 1.37% | New |
| BSP | Mothukuri Nagarjun | 1,189 | 0.61% | New |
| Margin of victory | | 49,326 | 25.22% | ▲19.69 |
| Turnout | | 196,346 | 81.03% | ▼0.92 |
| Total valid votes | | 195,620 | | |
| Registered electors | | 242,302 | | ▲13.14 |
| INC gain from BRS | | Swing | ▲8.15 | |

=== Assembly Election 2018 ===
2018 Telangana Legislative Assembly election : Achampet
| Party | Candidate | Votes | % | ±% |
|---|---|---|---|---|
| BRS | Guvvala Balaraju | 87,841 | 50.81% | ▲7.75 |
| INC | Dr. Chikkudu Vamshi Krishna | 78,285 | 45.28% | ▲10.35 |
| BJP | Medipur Malleshwar | 3,196 | 1.85% | New |
| NOTA | None of the above | 2,403 | 1.39% | ▲0.50 |
| Margin of victory | | 9,556 | 5.53% | ▼2.60 |
| Turnout | | 175,496 | 81.95% | ▲10.30 |
| Total valid votes | | 172,890 | | |
| Registered electors | | 214,152 | | ▲4.54 |
| BRS hold | | Swing | ▲7.75 | |

=== Assembly Election 2014 ===
2014 Andhra Pradesh Legislative Assembly election : Achampet
| Party | Candidate | Votes | % | ±% |
|---|---|---|---|---|
| BRS | Guvvala Balaraju | 62,584 | 43.06% | New |
| INC | Dr. Chikkudu Vamshi Krishna | 50,764 | 34.93% | ▼8.20 |
| TDP | Pothuganti Ramulu | 24,199 | 16.65% | ▼29.81 |
| BSP | Nidigonda Sriramu | 3,269 | 2.25% | ▲0.64 |
| CPI(M) | Chintha Anjaneyulu | 2,595 | 1.79% | New |
| NOTA | None of the above | 1,298 | 0.89% | New |
| Yuvajana Sramika Rythu Congress Party | B. Ravinder | 1,279 | 0.88% | New |
| Margin of victory | | 11,820 | 8.13% | ▲4.80 |
| Turnout | | 146,768 | 71.65% | ▲2.89 |
| Total valid votes | | 145,347 | | |
| Registered electors | | 204,850 | | ▼2.89 |
| BRS gain from TDP | | Swing | ▼3.40 | |

=== Assembly Election 2009 ===
2009 Andhra Pradesh Legislative Assembly election : Achampet
| Party | Candidate | Votes | % | ±% |
|---|---|---|---|---|
| TDP | Pothuganti Ramulu | 67,361 | 46.46% | ▲9.49 |
| INC | Dr. C. Vamshi Krishna | 62,530 | 43.13% | ▼10.79 |
| PRP | P. Muneendranath | 4,463 | 3.08% | New |
| LSP | Gadadasu Venkateshwarlu | 2,878 | 1.99% | New |
| BSP | Beesamalla Yosef | 2,336 | 1.61% | ▼2.93 |
| Independent | Mandala Sulthanamma | 2,280 | 1.57% | New |
| Pyramid Party of India | Y. Venkatesh | 2,186 | 1.51% | New |
| Independent | Kavali Venkataiah | 946 | 0.65% | New |
| Margin of victory | | 4,831 | 3.33% | ▼13.63 |
| Turnout | | 145,056 | 68.76% | ▲1.29 |
| Total valid votes | | 144,980 | | |
| Registered electors | | 210,950 | | ▲16.74 |
| TDP gain from INC | | Swing | ▼7.46 | |

=== Assembly Election 2004 ===
2004 Andhra Pradesh Legislative Assembly election : Achampet
| Party | Candidate | Votes | % | ±% |
|---|---|---|---|---|
| INC | Dr. Chikkudu Vamshi Krishna | 65,712 | 53.92% | ▲10.12 |
| TDP | P. Ramulu | 45,047 | 36.97% | ▼17.98 |
| Independent | Yamgondi Venkataiah | 5,723 | 4.70% | New |
| BSP | Y. P. Kashaiah | 5,535 | 4.54% | New |
| Margin of victory | | 20,665 | 16.96% | ▲5.82 |
| Turnout | | 121,925 | 67.47% | ▼1.59 |
| Total valid votes | | 121,861 | | |
| Rejected ballots | | 64 | 0.05% | ▼3.74 |
| Registered electors | | 180,698 | | ▲8.35 |
| INC gain from TDP | | Swing | ▼1.03 | |

=== Assembly Election 1999 ===
1999 Andhra Pradesh Legislative Assembly election : Achampet
| Party | Candidate | Votes | % | ±% |
|---|---|---|---|---|
| TDP | Pothuganti Ramulu | 60,878 | 54.95% | ▼13.98 |
| INC | Dr. C. Vamshi Krishna | 48,532 | 43.80% | ▲20.09 |
| Pyramid Party of India | Machipally Balaraju | 1,019 | 0.92% | New |
| Margin of victory | | 12,346 | 11.14% | ▼34.08 |
| Turnout | | 115,162 | 69.06% | ▼2.54 |
| Total valid votes | | 110,794 | | |
| Rejected ballots | | 4,368 | 3.79% | ▲0.49 |
| Registered electors | | 166,767 | | ▲13.07 |
| TDP hold | | Swing | ▼13.98 | |

=== Assembly Election 1994 ===
1994 Andhra Pradesh Legislative Assembly election : Achampet
| Party | Candidate | Votes | % | ±% |
|---|---|---|---|---|
| TDP | Pothuganti Ramulu | 70,390 | 68.93% | ▲21.88 |
| INC | Devarapaga Kirankumar | 24,209 | 23.71% | ▼26.23 |
| BJP | Balmuru Balaiah | 4,822 | 4.72% | New |
| BSP | Puttapaga Radhakrishna | 1,424 | 1.39% | New |
| Lok Party | Rama Dasu | 758 | 0.74% | New |
| Margin of victory | | 46,181 | 45.22% | ▲42.33 |
| Turnout | | 105,600 | 71.60% | ▼10.49 |
| Total valid votes | | 102,118 | | |
| Rejected ballots | | 3,482 | 3.30% | ▼3.78 |
| Registered electors | | 147,495 | | ▲24.78 |
| TDP gain from INC | | Swing | ▲18.99 | |

=== Assembly Election 1989 ===
1989 Andhra Pradesh Legislative Assembly election : Achampet
| Party | Candidate | Votes | % | ±% |
|---|---|---|---|---|
| INC | D. Kiran Kumar | 45,030 | 49.94% | ▲27.49 |
| TDP | P. Mahendranath | 42,421 | 47.05% | ▼23.04 |
| Independent | G. Buchaiah | 665 | 0.74% | New |
| Independent | D. Praveen Kumar | 629 | 0.70% | New |
| Independent | Panugantichennaiah | 557 | 0.62% | New |
| Margin of victory | | 2,609 | 2.89% | ▼44.75 |
| Turnout | | 97,036 | 82.09% | ▲16.18 |
| Total valid votes | | 90,169 | | |
| Rejected ballots | | 6,867 | 7.08% | ▲4.93 |
| Registered electors | | 118,206 | | ▲5.44 |
| INC gain from TDP | | Swing | ▼20.15 | |

=== Assembly Election 1985 ===
1985 Andhra Pradesh Legislative Assembly election : Achampet
| Party | Candidate | Votes | % | ±% |
|---|---|---|---|---|
| TDP | P. Mahendranath | 50,680 | 70.09% | New |
| INC | Jayanthi | 16,235 | 22.45% | ▼17.58 |
| Independent | Balakistaiah | 3,607 | 4.99% | New |
| Independent | Narsaiah | 801 | 1.11% | New |
| Margin of victory | | 34,445 | 47.64% | ▲31.97 |
| Turnout | | 73,896 | 65.91% | ▼2.56 |
| Total valid votes | | 72,305 | | |
| Rejected ballots | | 1,591 | 2.15% | ▼0.16 |
| Registered electors | | 112,112 | | ▲13.93 |
| TDP gain from Independent | | Swing | ▲14.39 | |

=== Assembly Election 1983 ===
1983 Andhra Pradesh Legislative Assembly election : Achampet
| Party | Candidate | Votes | % | ±% |
|---|---|---|---|---|
| Independent | Mahendranath Puttapaga | 36,660 | 55.70% | New |
| INC | D. Kiran Kumar | 26,344 | 40.03% | ▲22.23 |
| Independent | Gaddam Buchaiah | 2,811 | 4.27% | New |
| Margin of victory | | 10,316 | 15.67% | ▲0.59 |
| Turnout | | 67,374 | 68.47% | ▼1.09 |
| Total valid votes | | 65,815 | | |
| Rejected ballots | | 1,559 | 2.31% | ▼0.98 |
| Registered electors | | 98,400 | | ▲7.24 |
| Independent gain from INC(I) | | Swing | ▲7.06 | |

=== Assembly Election 1978 ===
1978 Andhra Pradesh Legislative Assembly election : Achampet
| Party | Candidate | Votes | % | ±% |
|---|---|---|---|---|
| INC(I) | R. M. Manohar | 30,026 | 48.64% | New |
| JP | Puttapaga Radhakrishna | 20,716 | 33.56% | New |
| INC | Mahendranath Puttapaga | 10,990 | 17.80% | ▼49.91 |
| Margin of victory | | 9,310 | 15.08% | ▼20.34 |
| Turnout | | 63,830 | 69.56% | ▲4.23 |
| Total valid votes | | 61,732 | | |
| Rejected ballots | | 2,098 | 3.29% | ▲3.29 |
| Registered electors | | 91,761 | | ▲14.87 |
| INC(I) gain from INC | | Swing | ▼19.07 | |

=== Assembly Election 1972 ===
1972 Andhra Pradesh Legislative Assembly election : Achampet
| Party | Candidate | Votes | % | ±% |
|---|---|---|---|---|
| INC | P. Mahendranath | 33,817 | 67.71% | ▲6.41 |
| Independent | P. Radhakrishna | 16,126 | 32.29% | New |
| Margin of victory | | 17,691 | 35.42% | ▼2.55 |
| Turnout | | 52,191 | 65.33% | ▲13.49 |
| Total valid votes | | 49,943 | | |
| Registered electors | | 79,884 | | ▲19.89 |
| INC hold | | Swing | ▲6.41 | |

=== Assembly Election 1967 ===
1967 Andhra Pradesh Legislative Assembly election : Achampet
| Party | Candidate | Votes | % | ±% |
|---|---|---|---|---|
| INC | P. Mahendranath | 20,166 | 61.30% | ▲0.66 |
| CPI | Y. Peddaiah | 7,677 | 23.34% | ▼16.02 |
| CPI(M) | Buchiah | 3,919 | 11.91% | New |
| Independent | Y. Sikhamany | 1,133 | 3.44% | New |
| Margin of victory | | 12,489 | 37.97% | ▲16.69 |
| Turnout | | 34,543 | 51.84% | ▲3.23 |
| Total valid votes | | 32,895 | | |
| Registered electors | | 66,633 | | ▲20.80 |
| INC hold | | Swing | ▲0.66 | |

=== Assembly Election 1962 ===
1962 Andhra Pradesh Legislative Assembly election : Achampet
| Party | Candidate | Votes | % | ±% |
|---|---|---|---|---|
| INC | K. Naganna | 15,583 | 60.64% | New |
| CPI | Sunkam Achalu | 10,114 | 39.36% | New |
| Margin of victory | | 5,469 | 21.28% | |
| Turnout | | 26,815 | 48.61% | |
| Total valid votes | | 25,697 | | |
| Registered electors | | 55,158 | | |
| INC win (new seat) | | | | |

== See also ==
- List of constituencies of Telangana Legislative Assembly
