= A. R. Mallu =

Indian politician

Sri Anantha Ramalu Mallu

Member of the 7th Lok Sabha for Nagarkurnool
- In office 18 January 1980 – 31 December 1984
- Preceded by: M. Bheeshma Dev
- Succeeded by: V. Tulasiram

Member of the 9th Lok Sabha for Nagarkurnool
- In office 2 December 1989 – 7 February 1990
- Preceded by: V. Tulasiram
- Succeeded by: Mallu Ravi

Personal details
- Born: 1942 Laxmipuram, Andhra Pradesh, India
- Died: 1990 (aged 47–48) Hyderabad
- Citizenship: Indian
- Party: Congress
- Spouse: Mallu Jhanaki
- Relations: 1st Son : Mallu Ramesh 2nd Son : Mallu shivaram
- Relatives: Mallu Bhatti Vikramarka (brother); Mallu Ravi (brother)
- Occupation: Politician

Anantha Ramulu Mallu (1942–1990) was an Indian politician who served in the Lok Sabha.

== Early life and education ==
Mallu was born in Laxmipuram Village, of Wyra mandal, Khammam district. He was the eldest son of his family. His father Akhilanda Dasu and his mother Manikyamma. Mallu Ravi and Mallu Bhatti Vikramarka are his brothers. He was a Post-graduate in Master of Arts in Political Science. He became a village development officer in 1962. He was General Secretary of state V.D.Os. Association for 16 years continuously.

Mallu resigned his job in 1978 and joined Congress Party. He was elected as Member - Lok Sabha from Nagarkurnool, Mahbubnagar district in the year 1980. As a member of Parliament, he proved himself as a true public representative with his timely action responding to various problems of his constituency. Impressed by his zeal and progress, Indira Gandhi sent him twice abroad as a delegate in a Parliamentary Committee. In 1986, he was nominated as Chairman, State Finance Corporation of India, by Rajiv Gandhi. He gave a new direction in its working and subsequently he was nominated as Joint Secretary AICC(I), and was elevated as a General Secretary, AICC (I) in 1989.

Mallu died on 7 February 1990 from a heart attack.
