= Itikyal =

Coordinates: 16°04′26″N 77°51′10″E

- mandal
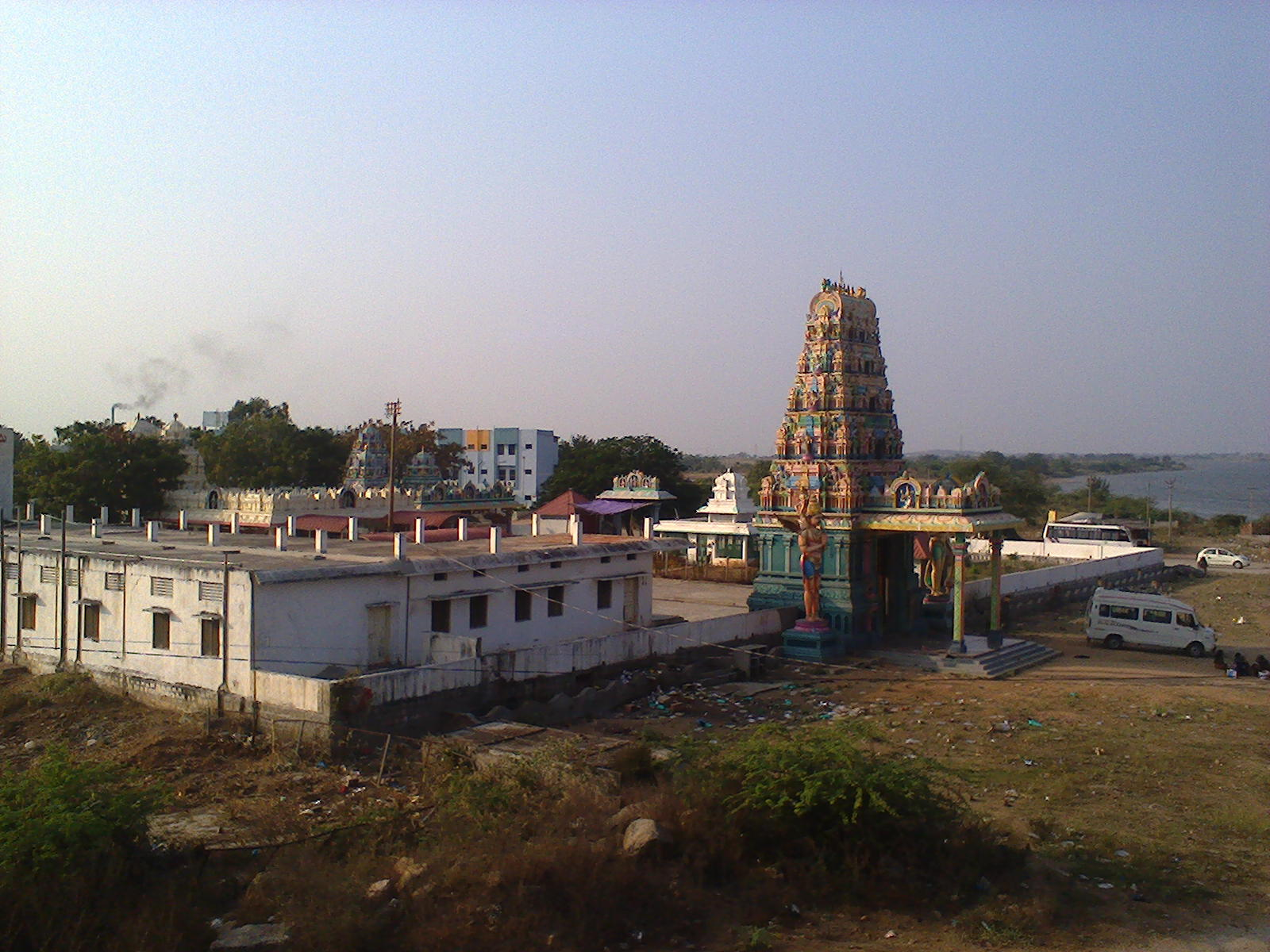
- Sri Rama Temple, Beechupally
- Interactive map of Itikyal
- Country: India
- State: Telangana
- District: Jogulamba Gadwal

Languages
  - Official: Telugu
- Time zone: UTC+5:30 (IST)
- Vehicle registration: TS-22
- Climate: hot (Köppen)
- Website: telangana.gov.in

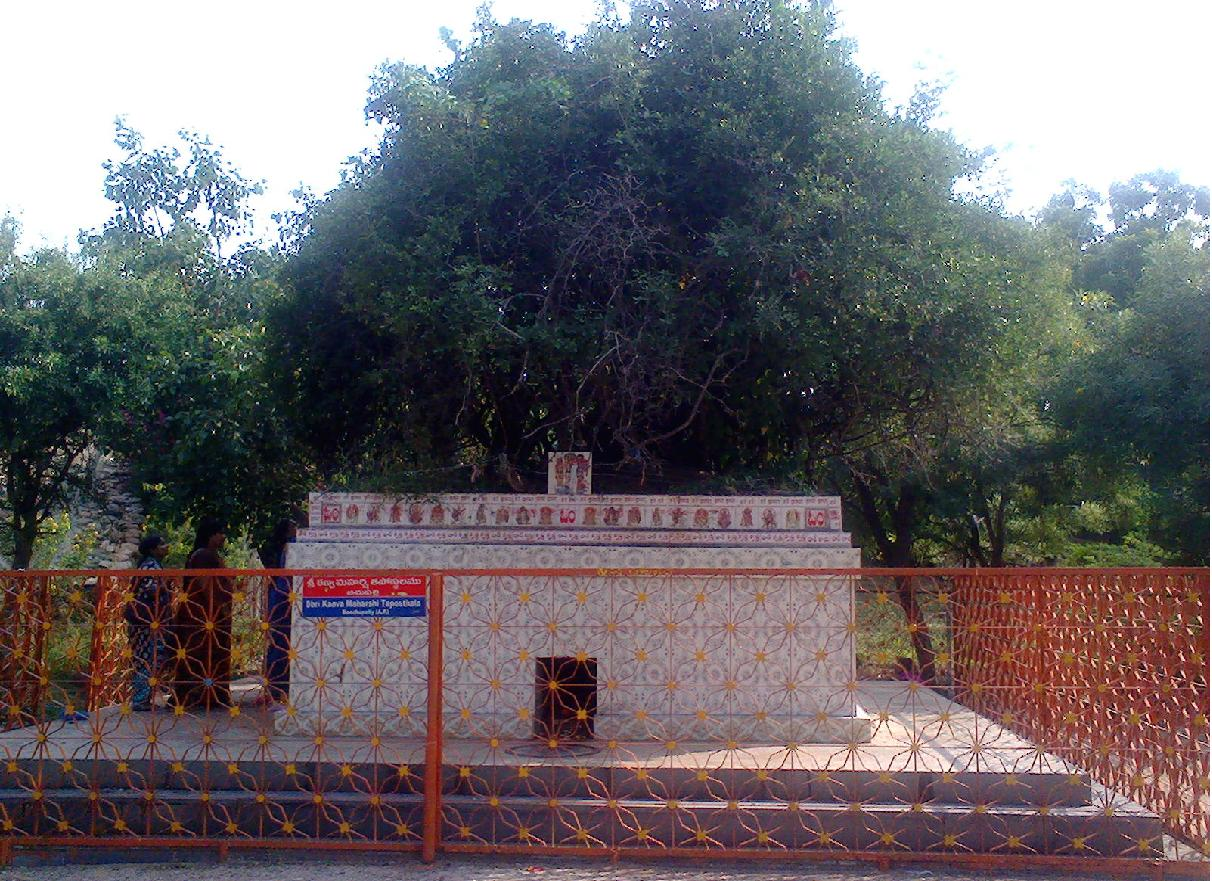
Tapovan of Kanva Maharshi

Itikyal is a mandal in Jogulamba Gadwal district, Telangana, India.

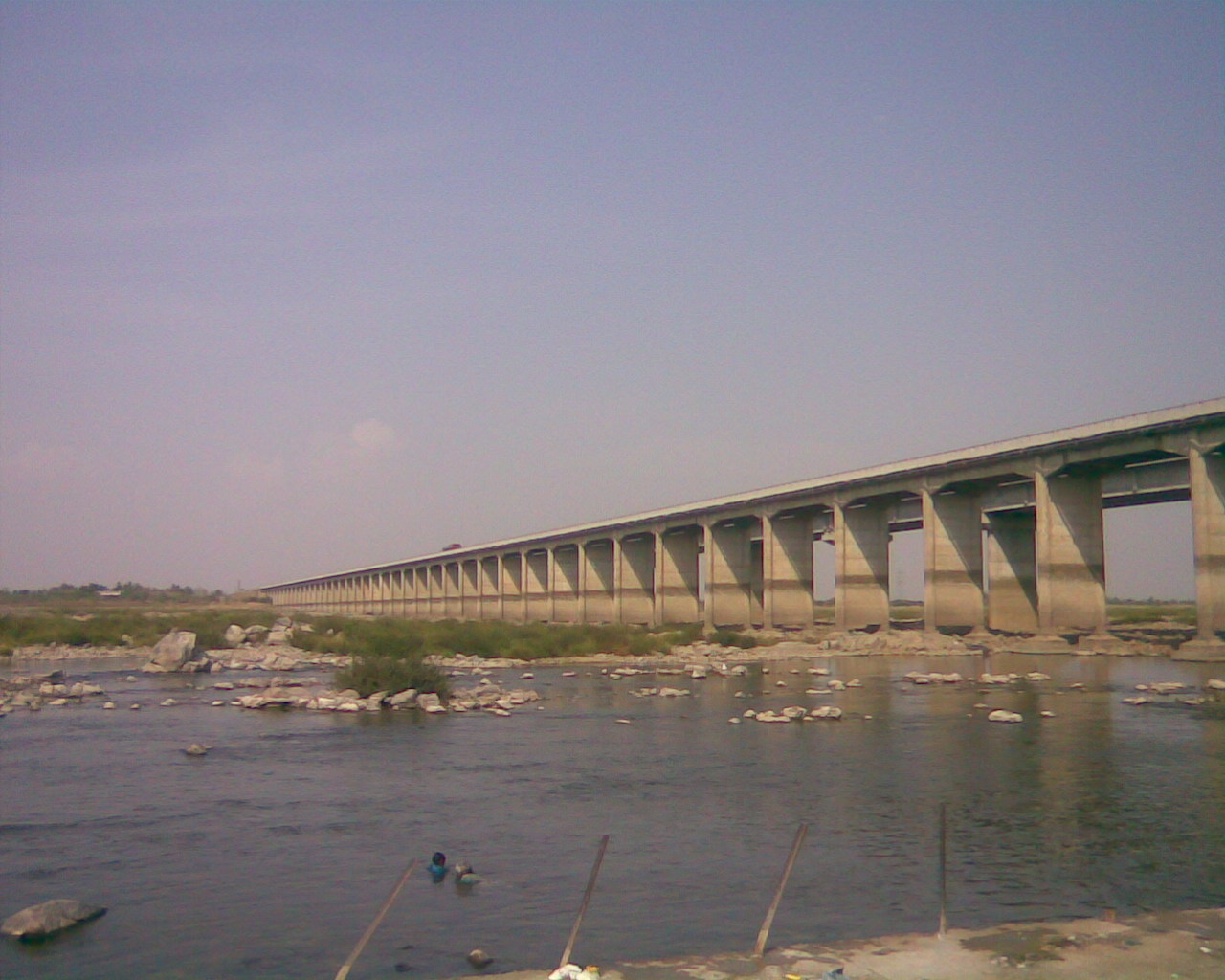
Road Bridge on Krishna River, Beechupally

== Villages ==
The villages in Itikyal mandal include:

- Itikyal
- Beechupally
