= Darshanam Mogilaiah =

Indian tribal musician (1951–2024)

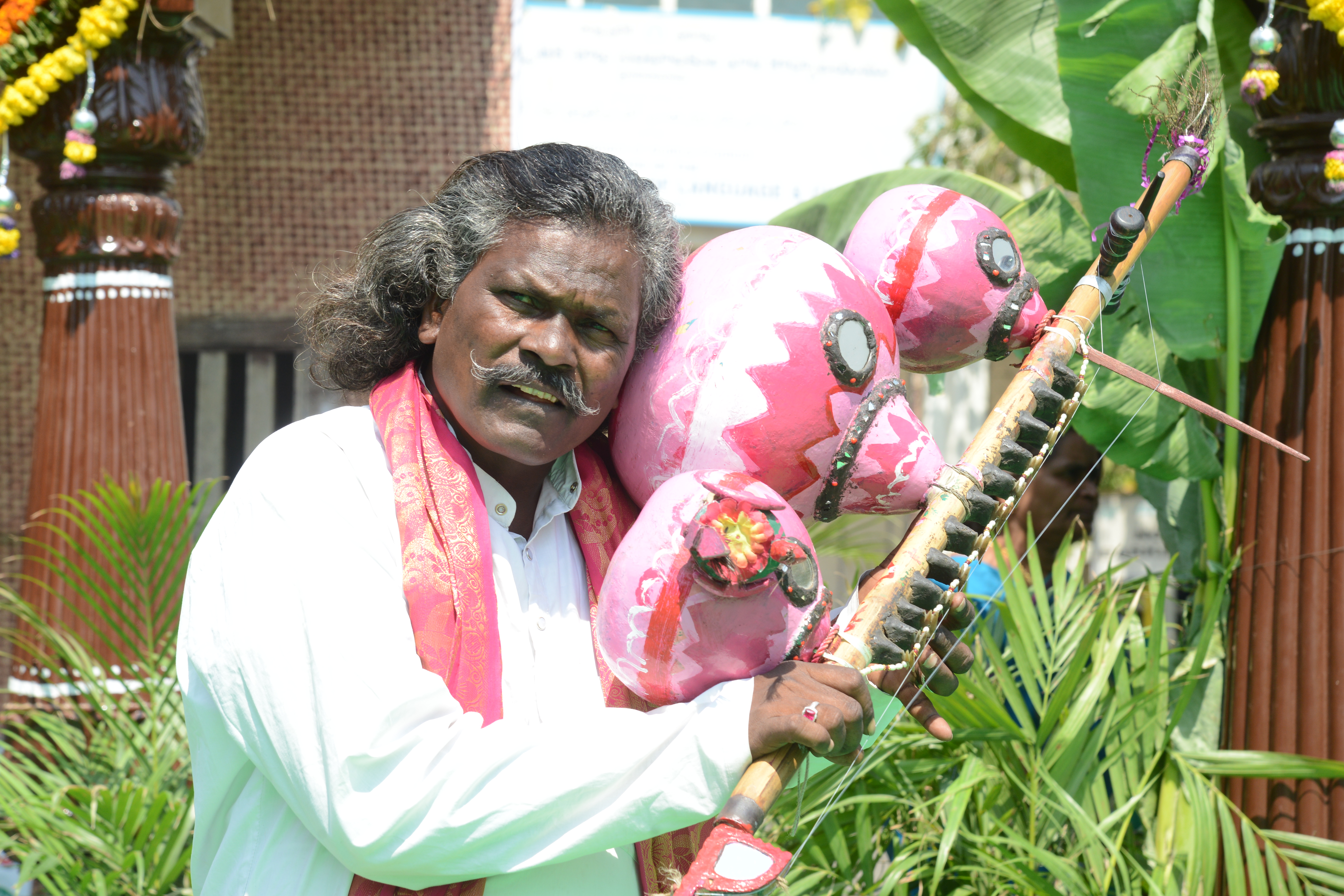
- Mogilaiah in 2016
- Born: 1951; Ausalikunta, Nagarkurnool district, Hyderabad State, India
- Awards: Padma Shri (2022)

Darshanam Mogilaiah (born 1951), also known as Kinnera Mogulaiah, is an Indian artist from the state of Telangana and is one of the few surviving performers of a tribal musical instrument known by the name Kinnera. The kinnera is a stringed instrument much like a veena whose origin can be traced back to as early as the 4th century CE. The instrument is indigenous to the nomadic tribes and the Dalit communities in the Deccan Plateau such as the Dakkali, Madiga and the Chenchu. There are kinneras with different numbers of stairs or steps. Mogilaiah's forefathers were pioneers in making and playing kinneras having different numbers of stairs. His father had made a nine-stair kinnera. Mogilaiah is the first person to create a 12-stair kinnera and is the only artist who made and plays the 12-step kinnera. In 2022, the Govt. of India honoured him with the Padma Shri award for his contributions as a kinnera musician.

== Life and work ==
Darshanam Mogilaiah hailed from a Madiga (Dalit) family in the Ausalikunta village of Lingal mandal in Nagarkurnool district of Telangana along the stretches of the Nallamala Hills. He did not have much formal education and has had no steady job with an assured income. He has seen much hardships and his life had been very difficult eking out a living doing odd jobs like a daily wager in construction sites. He worked as a laborer for 14 years in Adilabad, Karimnagar and Warangal. He also worked at a construction site in Mumbai.

In a sense, Mogilaiah reinvented the kinnera. The kinnera is a two-stringed instrument made using indigenous materials like bamboo, the dried outer shell of round bottle gourd, honeycomb, bull horn, beads, mirrors and peacock feathers. His ancestors made the kinnera with seven, eight or nine stairs. He was the first to make a kinnera with 12 stairs. His forefathers used women's hair, horse-tail hair and even animal nerves as the strings. He replaced the nerves with metal strings. Mogilaiah learned the art of playing kinnera from his father Yellaiah. He had started traveling with his father from the age of eight. Now, Mogilaiah has been singing folk tales of local heroes for over five decades, heroes who helped the poor like Pandugolla Sayanna, Endavetla Pakiraiah and Miya Saab, all of whom helped the poor.

Mogilaiah's forefathers are believed to have played the kinnera in the court of the Raja of Wanaparthy about 400 years ago. Wanaparthy Samsthanam or Raja of Wanaparthy was a vassal of the Nizam of Hyderabad. It was one of the three important Samsthanams, the other two being Gadwal Samsthanam and Jatprole Samsthanam. He has sung a part of the title song of the 2022 Telugu language action drama film, Bheemla Nayak directed by Saagar K Chandra and starring Pawan Kalyan.

Mogilaiah's second son Mahender accompanied his father during kinnera performances in cultural programmes held in different parts of the country. Mahendar later learned to play the kinnera and took his father's legacy forward.

== Recognition ==
- In the year 2022, the Government of India conferred the Padma Shri award, the third highest award in the Padma series of awards, on Darshanam Mogulaiah for his distinguished service in the field of art. The award is in recognition of his service as a "Tribal Kinnera player and folk singer from Nagarkurnool, last one to have mastered the 12 steps on the instrument."

=== Other prizes and recognitions ===
- Ugadi Puraskaram, the highest State honor in Telangana State (2015)
- Darshanam Mogulaiah had an honored mention in the textbook for Social Studies for the Class VIII students of Telangana State. The textbook was first published by Telangana State Govt. in the year 2013.

== See also ==
- Padma Shri Award recipients in the year 2022
