= Nandi Yellaiah =

Indian politician (1942–2020)

Member of Parliament Lok Sabha
- In office 2014–2019
- Preceded by: Manda Jagannatham
- Succeeded by: Pothuganti Ramulu
- Constituency: Nagarkurnool

Member of parliament Loksabha
- Incumbent
- Assumed office 1977-1984 1989 - 1998
- Constituency: Siddipet (Lok Sabha constituency)

Member of parliament Rajya Sabha
- In office 2008–2014

Personal details
- Born: 1 July 1942 Telangana, Hyderabad State
- Died: 8 August 2020 (aged 78) Hyderabad, Telangana
- Party: Indian National Congress

Nandi Yellaiah (1 July 1942 – 8 August 2020) was an Indian politician from Indian National Congress party who served as a member of the Parliament of India from Nagarkurnool constituency of Telangana state in the Lok Sabha, the lower house of the Indian Parliament.

== Early life ==
He was born in Tajir Nagar, Bholakpur, Musheerabad, in Hyderabad State to Nandi Nagaiah. He finished his matriculation.

== Career ==
He was a six-term member of Lok Sabha. He was elected to 6th, 7th, 9th, 10th, 11th Lok Sabha from Siddipet (s.c) parliamentary constituency. He was elected to the 16th Lok Sabha from Nagarkurnool defeating Manda Jagannatham. He also represented Rajya Sabha until 2014.

== Death ==
He died on 8 August 2020, aged 78, from COVID-19 during the COVID-19 pandemic in India.

Lok Sabha
Preceded by Gaddam Venkatswamy	Member of Parliament for Siddipet; 1977 – 1984	Succeeded by G. Vijaya Rama Rao
Preceded by G. Vijaya Rama Rao	Member of Parliament for Siddipet; 1989 – 1998	Succeeded by Malyala Rajaiah
Preceded by Manda Jagannath	Member of Parliament for Nagarkurnool; 2014 – 2019	Succeeded by Pothuganti Ramulu
