= Manda Jagannath =

Indian politician (1951–2025)

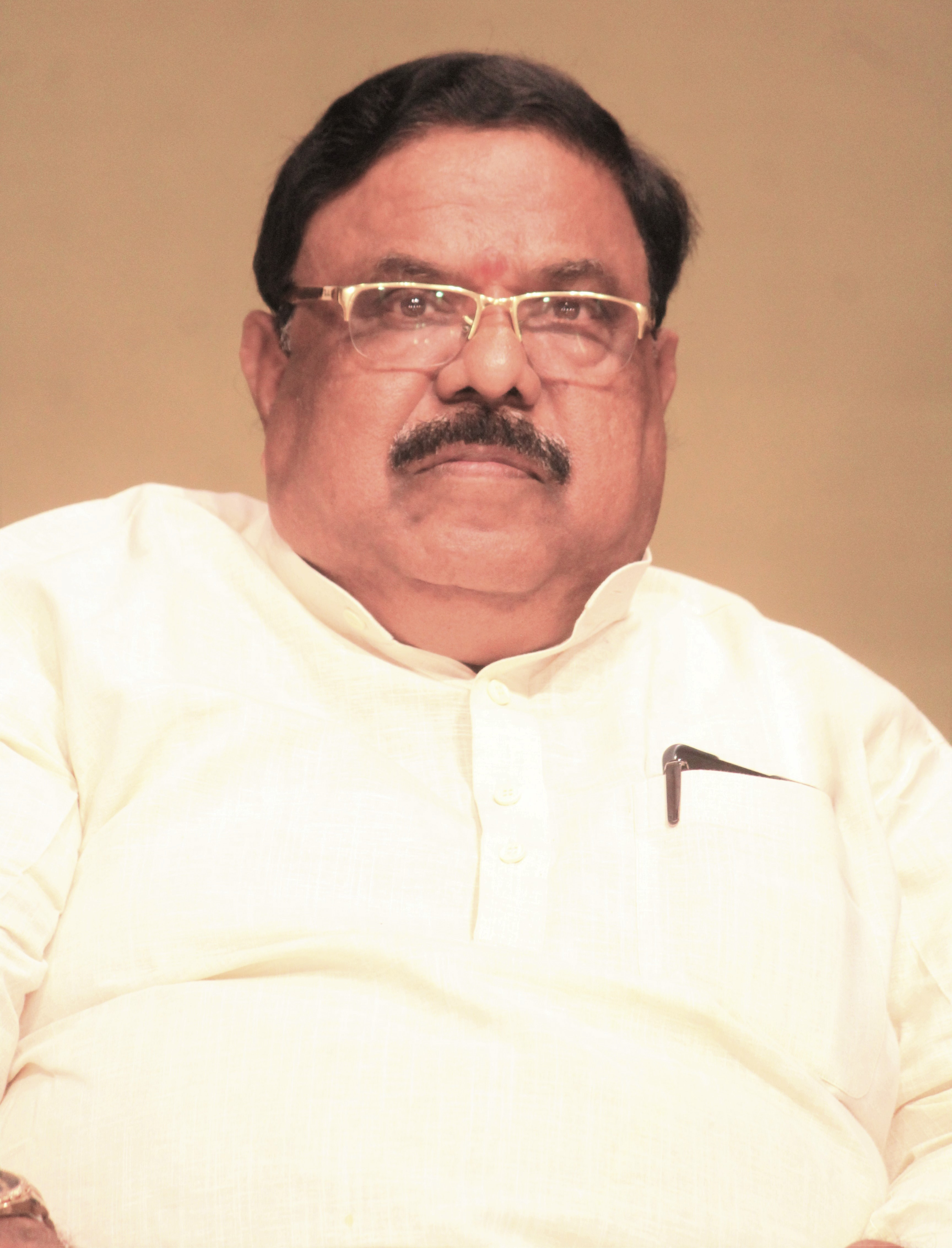

Member of Parliament, Lok Sabha
- In office 11 October 1999 — 18 May 2014
- Preceded by: Mallu Ravi
- Succeeded by: Mallu Ravi
- Constituency: Nagarkurnool
- In office 10 May 1996 — 4 December 1997
- Preceded by: Mallu Ravi
- Succeeded by: Mallu Ravi
- Constituency: Nagarkurnool

Personal details
- Born: 22 May 1951 Itikyala, Jogulamba Gadwal district, Hyderabad State, India
- Died: 12 January 2025 (aged 73) Hyderabad, Telangana, India
- Party: Bahujan Samaj Party
- Other political affiliations: Telugu Desam Party, Telangana Rashtra Samithi, Indian National Congress
- Spouse: M. Savitri
- Children: Two sons, one daughter
- As of 16 September, 2006

Manda Jagannath (Telugu: మంద జగన్నాథ్; 22 May 1951 – 12 January 2025) was an Indian politician who was a member of the 11th, 13th, 14th & 15th Lok Sabha, representing Nagarkurnool constituency. He belonged to the Bahujan Samaj Party.

== Background ==
Manda Jagannadham was born in Mahbubnagar district, Telangana on 22 May 1951. He held a bachelor's degree in medicine. Jagannath did his MBBS from Osmania University.

Jagannath died on 12 January 2025, at the age of 73.

== Career ==
After graduating with a medicine degree he worked as a doctor in Mahbubnagar and Hyderabad.

=== Political career ===
Jagannath was one among the 5 members representing Telugu Desam Party in Lok Sabha, and a member of the party's Polit Bureau, its decision-making body. He was expelled from Telugu Desam for voting against Telugu Desam Party. He was expelled & disqualified from Lok Sabha by speaker Somnath Chatterjee for voting against party's WHIP. He represented the Nagarkurnool constituency of Andhra Pradesh.

He switched to the Indian National Congress party during the No Confidence Motion. He was re-elected in 2009. On 29 December 2008, Mr Jagannath was appointed Andhra Pradesh government's special representative in New Delhi.

==== TRS Party ====
Jagannath joined TRS party at the peak of Telangana agitation.

==== Bahujan Samaj Party ====
Jagannath was inducted into the Bahujan Samaj Party by Manda Prabhakar, the State President of BSP.

== Electoral History ==
=== Lok Sabha ===
Year	Constituency	Party	Votes	%	Opponent	Party	Votes	%	Result	Margin	%
1996	Nagarkurnool	TDP	368,134	48.68	Mallu Ravi	INC	291,759	38.58	Won	+76,375	+10.10
1998	Nagarkurnool	TDP	309,452	40.26	Dr. Mallu Ravi	INC	329,127	42.82	Lost	−19,675	−2.56
1999	Nagarkurnool	TDP	431,095	53.11	Dr. Mallu Ravi	INC	364,195	44.87	Won	+66,900	+8.24
2004	Nagarkurnool	TDP	405,046	45.85	K.S. Ratnam	IND	305,396	34.57	Won	+99,650	+11.28
2009	Nagarkurnool	INC	422,745	41.23	Guvvala Balaraju	TRS	374,978	36.57	Won	+47,767	+4.66
2014	Nagarkurnool	TRS	403,399	36.14	Yellaiah Nandi	INC	420,075	37.64	Lost	−16,676	−1.50
