= Pedda Thandrapadu =

Village in Telangana, India

Coordinates: 15°55′36″N 77°46′31″E

Pedda Thandrapadu is a village in Jogulamba Gadwal district, Telangana, India.
