= Dharur =

Dharur may refer to:

- Dharur, Beed, a city in the state of Maharashtra, India
- Dharur, Vikarabad district, a town in the state of Telangana, India
- Dharur, Jogulamba Gadwal district, a mandal in the state of Telangana, India
