= Amaravai =

- village
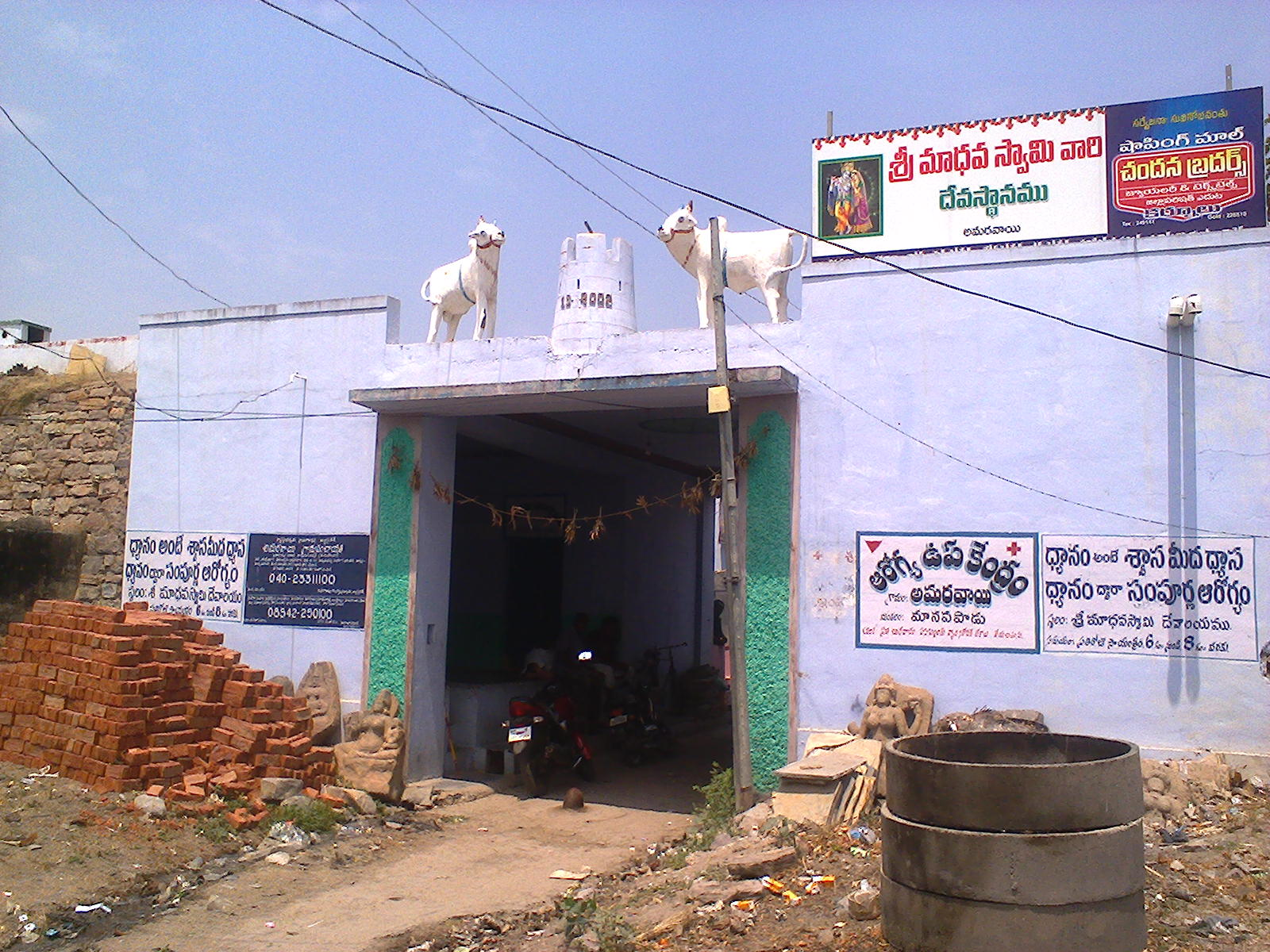
- Amaravai
- Interactive map of Amaravai
- Coordinates: 15°57′50″N 77°56′28″E
- Country: India
- State: Telangana
- District: Jogulamba Gadwal district

Languages
  - Official: Telugu
- Time zone: UTC+5:30 (IST)
- PIN: 509128
- Vehicle registration: AP22
- Nearest city: Kurnool
- Lok Sabha constituency: Nagarkurnool
- Vidhan Sabha constituency: Alampur
- Climate: hot (Köppen)

Amaravai is a village in Manopadu Mandal in Jogulamba Gadwal district of Telangana state, India.
