= Boravelli =

Coordinates: 16°02′N 77°58′E

Boravelli is a village in Manopadu mandal of Jogulamba Gadwal district in the state of Telangana, India.

This village was formally an agricultural sector area. Every January people celebrate Jaatara. The village is a historic place in Jougulamba Gadwal district. It is the birthplace of Suravaram Pratap Reddy. The village is 4 km (2.5 mi) away from NH-7 which is renamed as NH-44.

== Population ==
The population of this village was around 5000.

== Languages ==
Residents of Boravelli speak Telugu, Hindi and Urdu.
