= Ravula Ravindranath Reddy =

Indian politician

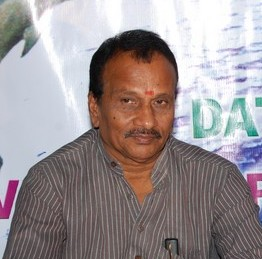
- Ravindranath Reddy

Member of Legislative Assembly United Andhra Pradesh
- In office 1985–1994
- Constituency: Alampur
- In office 1999–2004
- Constituency: Alampur

Personal details
- Other political affiliations: Bharatiya Janata Party; Telangana Sadana Samithi
- Relatives: Ravula Chandra Sekar Reddy (cousin)

Ravula Ravindranath Reddy is a politician from Mahbubnagar district in Andhra Pradesh, India. He was a Member of the Legislative Assembly and represented the Alampur constituency four times in Andhra Pradesh. He is the cousin brother of Ravula Chandra Sekar Reddy, a politician from the Telugu Desam Party who is a Member of the Legislative Assembly representing the Wanaparthy constituency in Andhra Pradesh. Ravindranath Reddy contested the 2009 general elections as an independent candidate from Devarkadra constituency. He owns an educational society and a hospital in Kothakota in Mahbubnagar district. His wife Dr. R. Parijatham, M.D., DGO is an educationist and gynecologist in the Mahbubnagar district.

== Early life ==
Ravula Ravindranath Reddy started his political career in the Bharatiya Janata Party (BJP). He served BJP for several years as MLA and also played an important role in the expansion of BJP in Andhra Pradesh. Later he withdrew his support of BJP as the BJP was not giving any clarity on separate Telangana state. Hence he became the co-founder of the Telangana Sadhana Samiti (TSS) party which was headed by Tiger Narendra. Later TSS merged with TRS party at the invitation of K. Chandra Shekar Rao. Ravula Ravindranath Reddy acted as politburo member and steering committee chairman of the TSS party.
