= Guvvala Balaraju =

Indian politician

Dr. Guvvala Balaraju
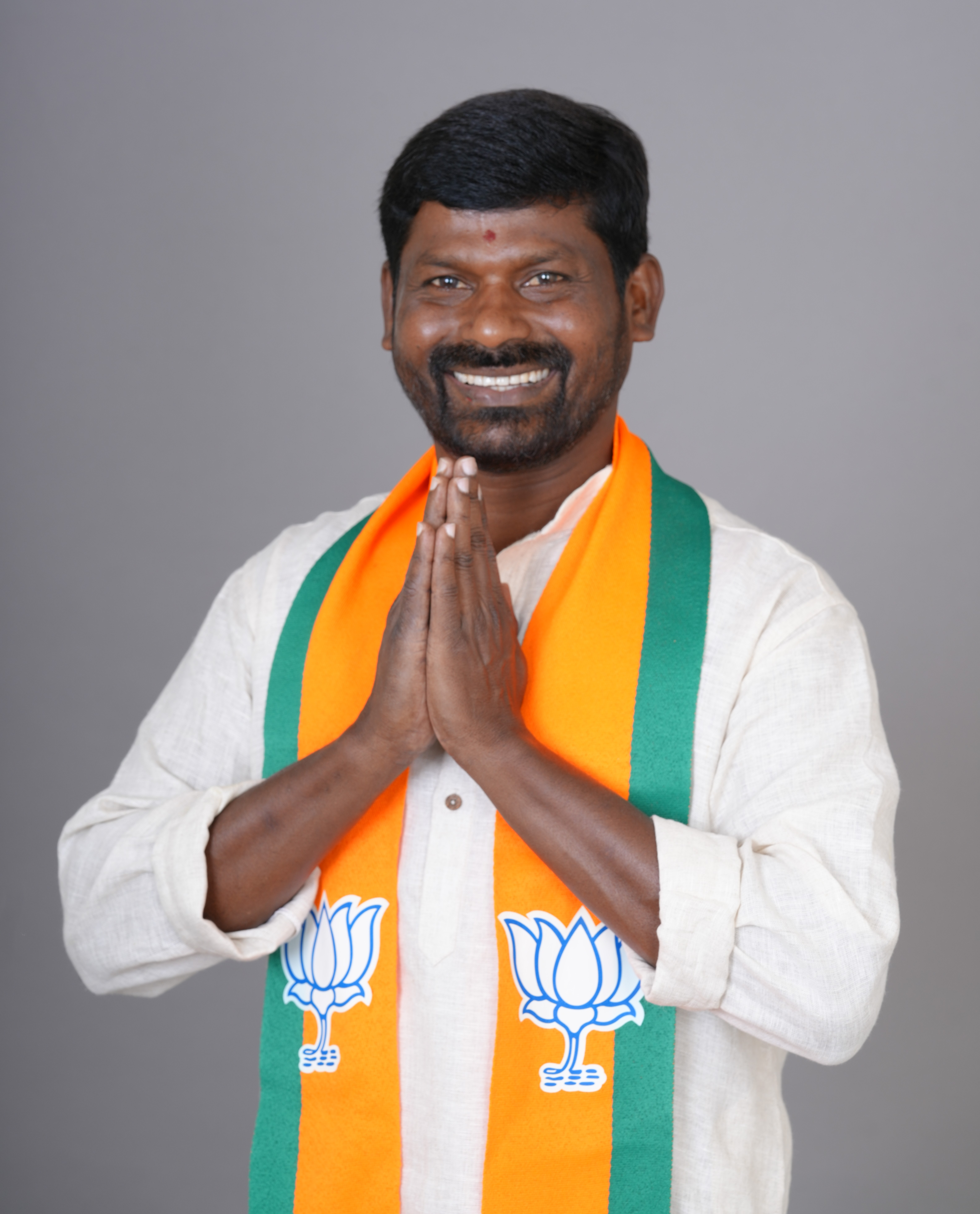

Member of Telangana Legislative Assembly
- In office 2 June 2014 – 3 December 2023
- Succeeded by: Chikkudu Vamshi Krishna
- Constituency: Achampet

Personal details
- Born: 30 June 1981 (age 45) Gopalpet, Telangana
- Party: BJP (From 10 August 2025)
- Other political affiliations: BRS (Until 2 August 2025)
- Spouse: G. Amala
- Children: 2 sons

Guvvala Balaraj is an Indian politician who is a former member of the legislative assembly representing Achampet (SC) (Assembly constituency).

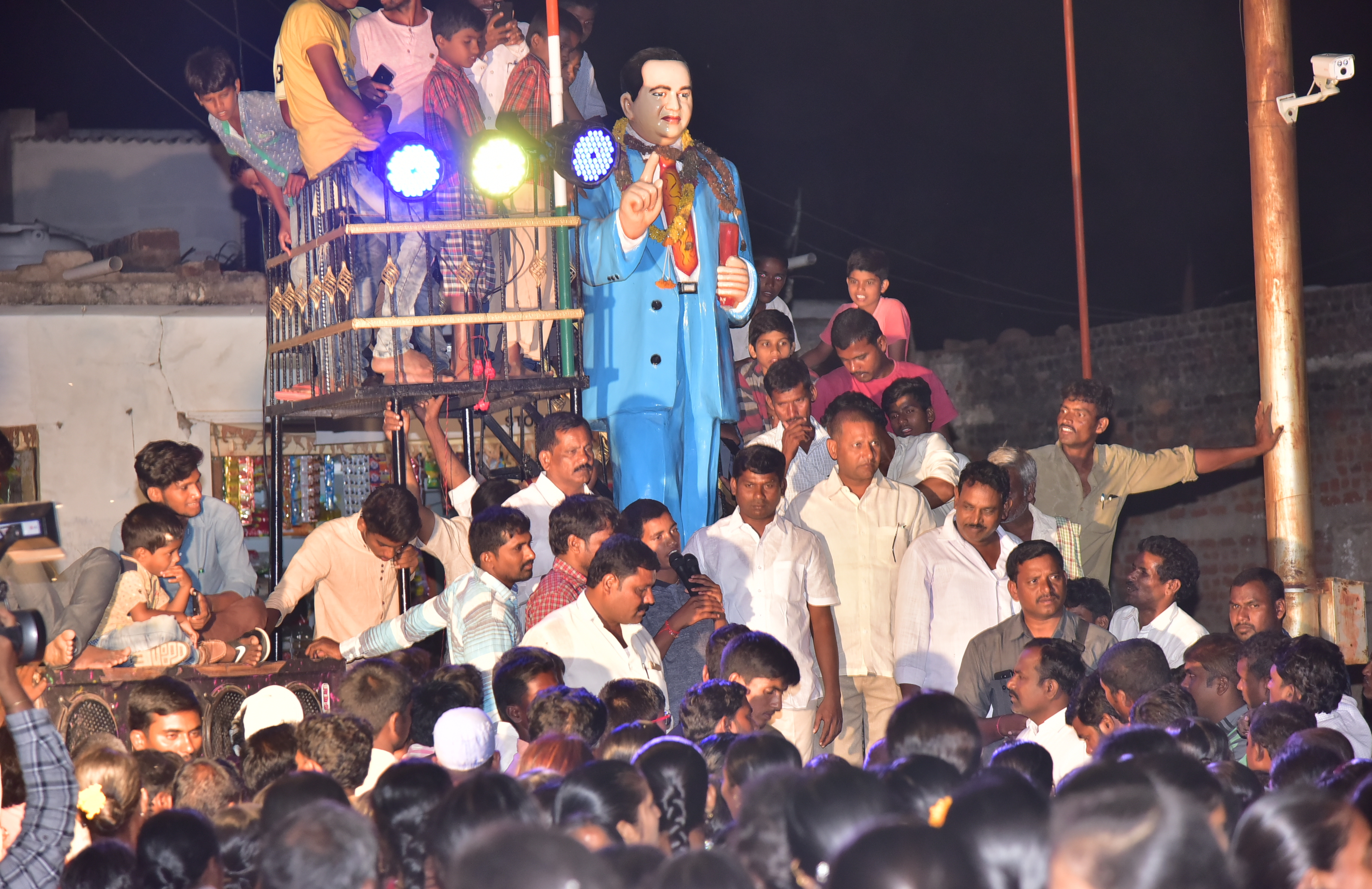
Guvvala-balaraju-speech

== Early life ==
He was born in village in Wanaparthy in Mahbubnagar district, Andhra Pradesh to Guvvala Ramulu & Bakkamma, an agricultural laborer. He went to ZPHS in Wanaparthy, graduation from New Government Degree College, Khairtabad and LLM from PRR Law College, Hyderabad.

== Career ==
He started working part-time with his father, who was a laborer and later became a small construction contractor. He now runs a company, GBR Infrastructure in Hyderabad.

=== Political career ===
He contested but lost to Manda Jagannath as a Member of Parliament for Nagarkurnool constituency. He won as an MLA from Achampet with 11,820 votes majority in the first Telangana Legislative Elections, 2014 and second time in 2018 with a majority of 9,556 votes and lost in 2023 Election by a huge margin of 49,326 votes. He worked as Bharat Rashtra Samithi official spokesperson.

Guvvala Balaraju has formally resigned from Bharat Rashtra Samithi party on 2 August 2025 and joined BJP on 10 August in the presence of the party President N. Ramchander Rao.
