= Challa Venkatrami Reddy =

Indian politician

- Born: Hyderabad
- Other names: Pullur Puli and Challa
- Occupation: Politician
- Years active: 2004–present
- Spouse: Single

Challa Venkatrami Reddy is a politician in Alampur, Mahbubnagar, Telangana, India. He was an independent MLA for Alampur Constituency from 2004 to 2009. He supported the Congress government in the state led by Dr Y.S Rajashekar Reddy. He is the grandson of Dr Neelam Sanjeeva Reddy, former president of India.

Challa Venkatrami Reddy was elected as MLC under MLA quota from BRS Party in 2023.

== Political career ==
- Village President for Pullur, Alampur, Telangana. 2002-2004
- MLA from 2004 to 2009 (Alampur)
- MLC
