= V. M. Abraham =

Indian politician

V. M. Abraham (born 1948) is an Indian politician from Telangana. He served as a Member of the Legislative Assembly winning the 2018 Telangana Legislative Assembly election from Alampur Assembly constituency in Jogulamba Gadwal district, which is reserved for the Scheduled Caste community. He represented Telangana Rashtra Samithi.

== Early life ==
Abraham is from Vallur Village, Itikyal Mandal, Jogulamba Gadwal District, Telangana. He is the son of Venkatanna. He married Vijayalakshmi. He completed his MBBS from Osmania Medical College, Hyderabad in 1974.

== Career ==
Abraham started his political career with Telugu Desam Party but later shifted to Congress. He was first elected as an MLA winning the 2009 Andhra Pradesh Legislative Assembly election representing the Indian National Congress. In the 2014 Andhra Pradesh Legislative Assembly election, he contested the Alampur seat on a Telugu Desam Party ticket but lost to S. A. Sampath Kumar of the Indian National Congress by 6730 votes. In 2023, he returned to the Congress party but did not get the ticket to contest from Alampur in 2023 Legislative election.
