= Uppunuthala =

Uppununthala
- mandal
- Country: India
- State: Telangana
- District: Naagar kurnool

Government
  - Type: TRS
  - Body: TRS

Languages
  - Official: Telugu
- Time zone: UTC+5:30 (IST)
- Vehicle registration: AP22
- Climate: hot (Köppen)

Uppunuthala or Uppununthala is a Mandal in Naagar kurnool district, Telangana, India.

== Institutions ==
- Zilla Parishad High School
- Guvvalonipally car
- Kamsanipally
- Koratikal
- Laxmapoor (pg)
- Mamillapally
- Marripally
- Peddapur
- Penimella
- Pertiwanipally
- Sadgodu
- Tadoor
- Upparipally
- Uppununthala
- Veltoor

ZPTC - ANANTHA PRATAP REDDY
