= Beechupally =

Shrine in Telangana, India

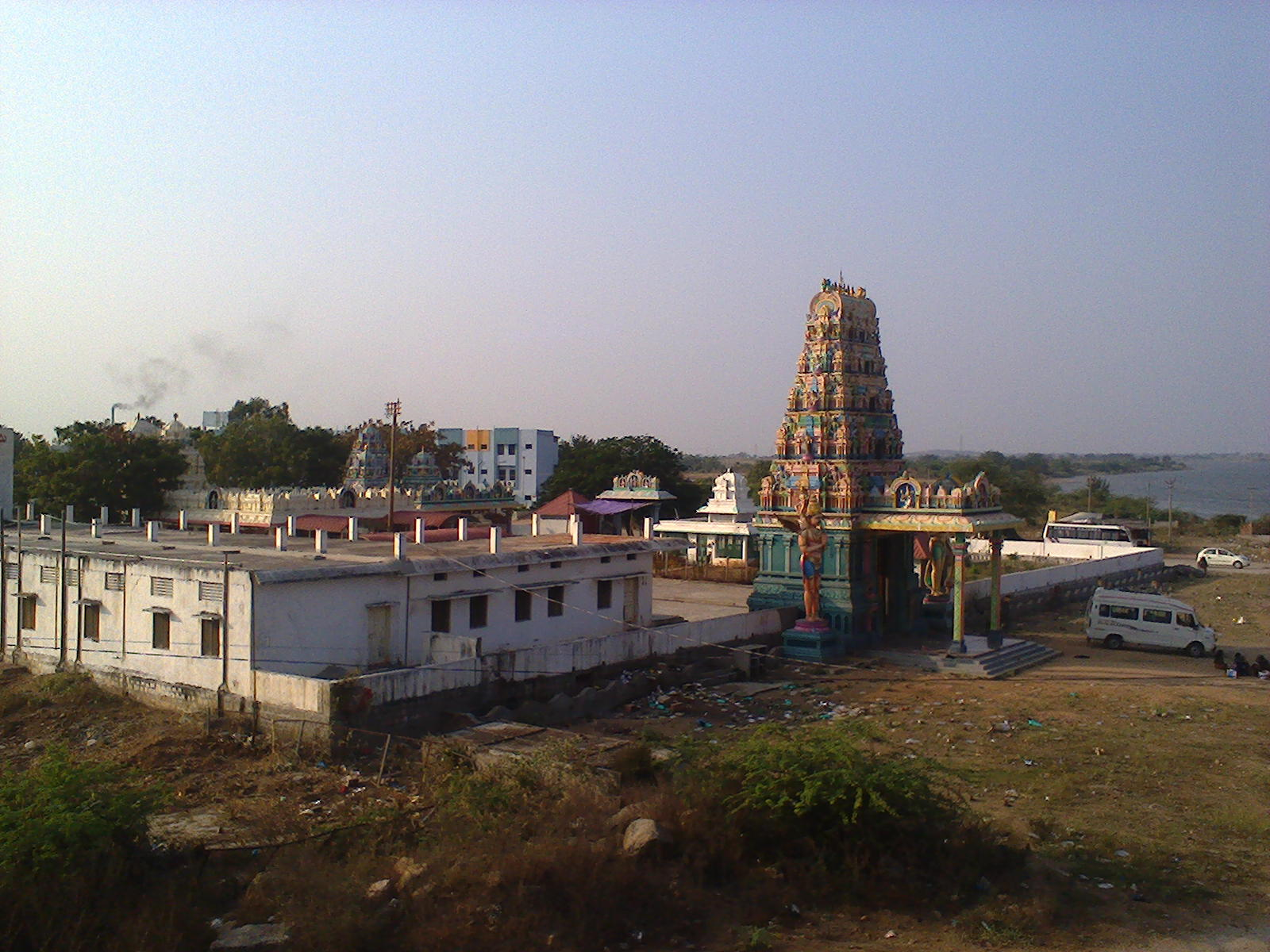
Ramalayam, Beechupally

Beechupally in Jogulamba Gadwal district, Telangana, India, is a shrine of the Hindu god Hanuman (Anjaneya Swamy). It is located on the banks of the Krishna River (where obsequies to the dead take place according to Hindu custom) about 30 kilometers downstream from the Jurala Project.

Initially, the shrine consisted of a Hanuman temple about 200 meters away from the river and a Shiva lingam temple near the river. During the rainy season the river rises high enough to touch the Shiva lingam temple. A temple of Rama was also built in the area in 1992. For the convenience of devotees, several ghats were built for pushkara snanam,, a ritual bath that takes place every 12 years.

During the 2016 Krishna pushkaras the government of Telangana State made elaborate arrangements and constructed several ghats for the pilgrims.

The Beechupally shrine is near two islands on the Krishna River. The larger island (Gurram Gadda village) has an area of about 10 km^{2} and is populated by farmers due to its soil fertility. A smaller island on the east side is called Nizam Konda: its port belongs to the Nawabs of Nizam.

== Residential school ==
Beechupally has a residential school for boys, with classes from Class V to Class X. It started in the premises of Beechupally Anjaneya Swamy Temple and later moved to its own building in Beechupally.

== Photo gallery ==
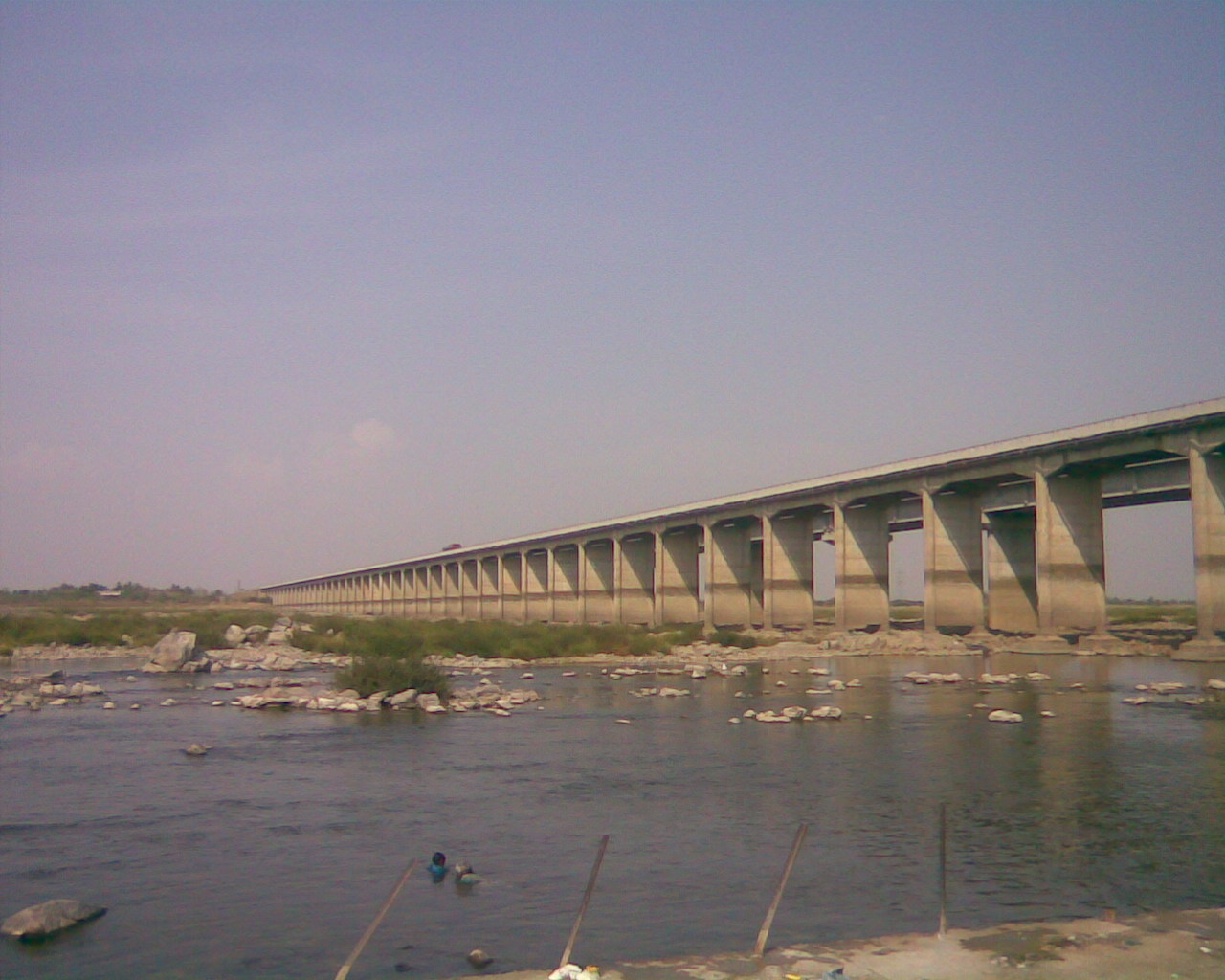
Road bridge on Krishna River, Beechupally

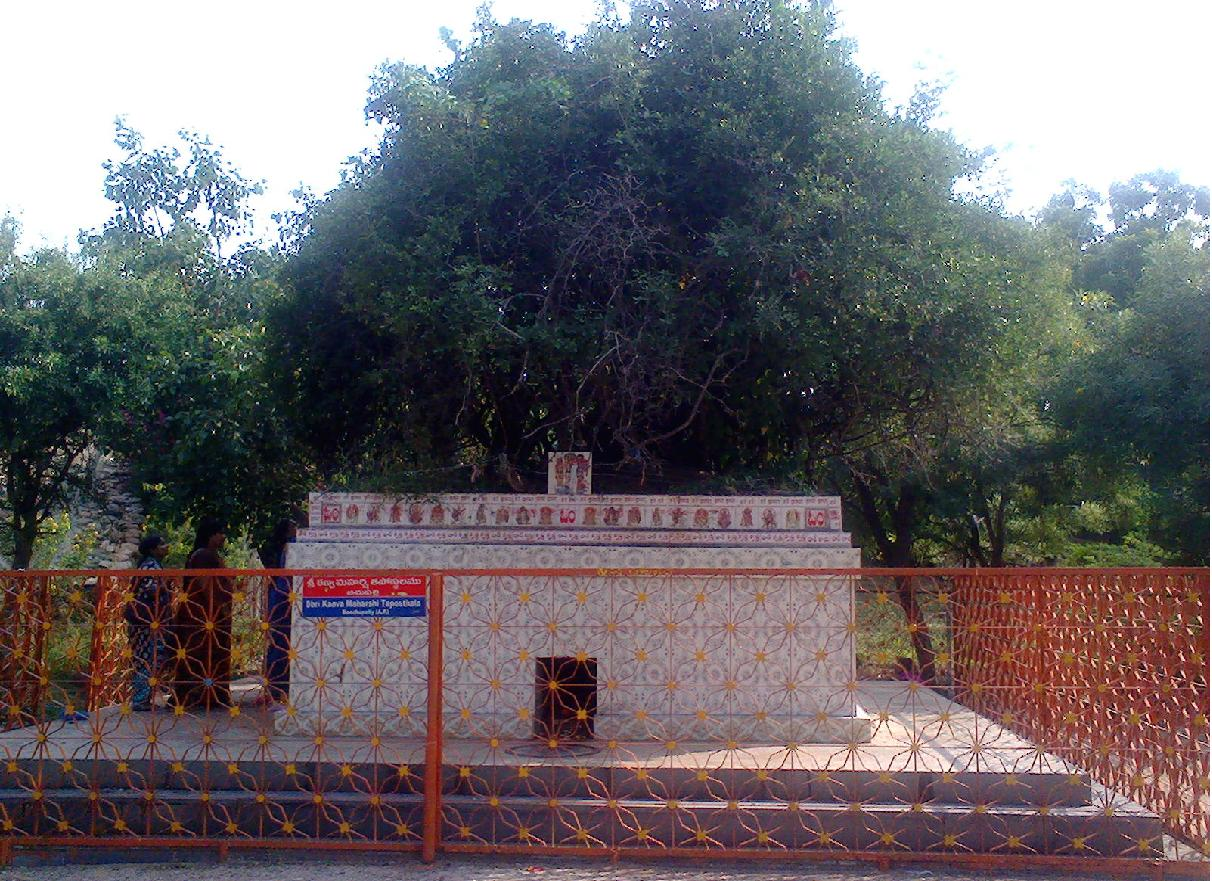
Tapovan of Kanva Maharshi

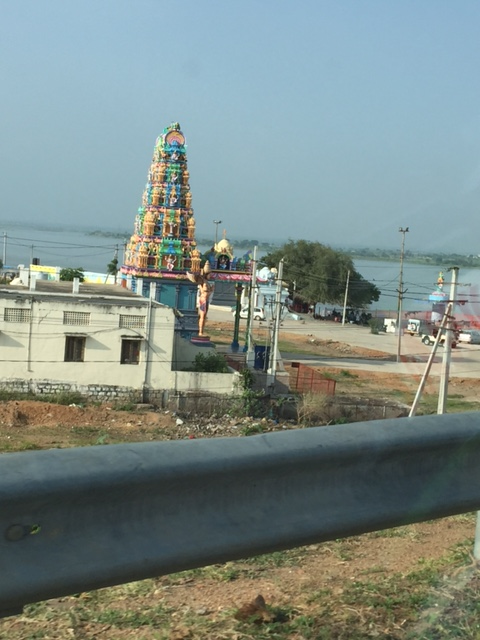
Anajaneya Swamy Temple, Beechupally

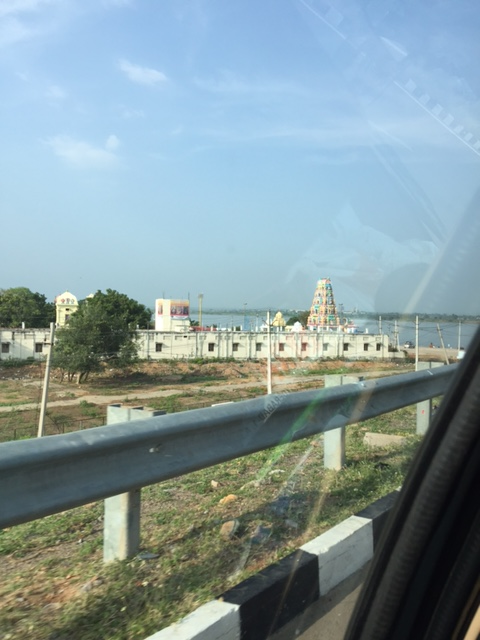
Anajaneya Swamy Temple, Beechupally

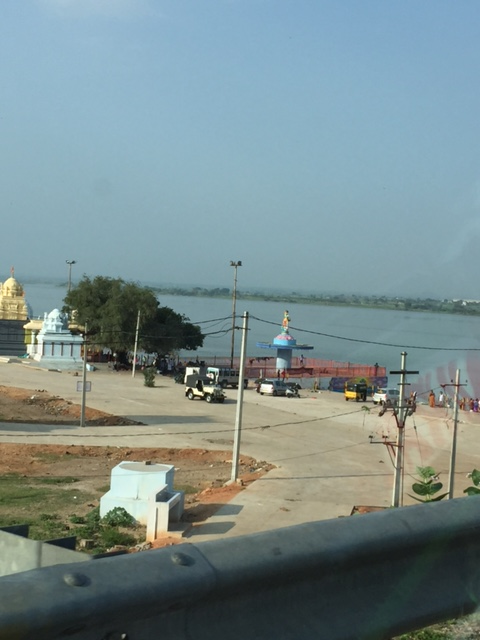
River Krishna flowing full near Beechupally

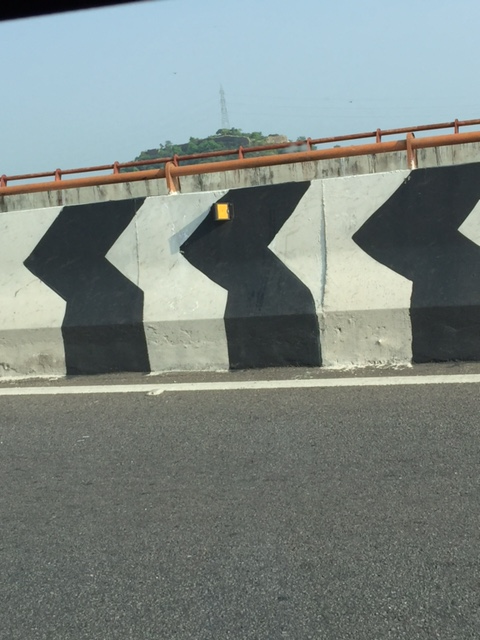
Fort on the Island in River Krishna near Beechupally
