= Pothuganti Ramulu =

Indian politician

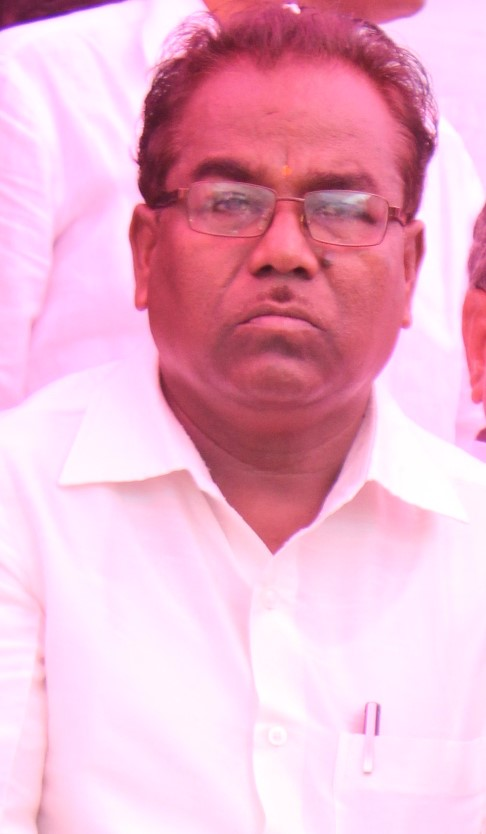

Member of Parliament, Lok Sabha
- In office 23 May 2019 – 4 June 2024
- Preceded by: Nandi Yellaiah
- Succeeded by: Mallu Ravi
- Constituency: Nagarkurnool (Lok Sabha constituency)

Personal details
- Born: 17 August 1952 (age 74) Gunduru (V), Kalwakurthi (M) Nagarkurnool (Dist)
- Party: BJP
- Other political affiliations: Telugu Desam Party, Bharat Rashtra Samithi
- Spouse: Bhagya Laxmi
- Children: 3 (including Bharath Prasad Pothuganti)
- Education: Osmania University (B.A., 1974)
- Occupation: Politician

Pothuganti Ramulu is an Indian politician from Telangana. He served as a member of parliament in the 17th Lok Sabha, representing the Nagarkurnool (SC) constituency after winning the 2019 Indian general election as a candidate of the Bharat Rashtra Samithi (BRS). In 2024, he joined the Bharatiya Janata Party (BJP).

== Early life and education ==
Ramulu was born on 17 August 1952 in Gunduru village, Kalwakurthi mandal, Telangana. He earned a Bachelor of Arts degree from Osmania University in 1974. Before entering politics, he worked for 16 years in the government marketing yard. In 1994, he entered active politics, inspired by former minister Mahendranath, who had earlier represented Achampet in the Andhra Pradesh Assembly.

== Political life ==
Coming from an underprivileged background, Ramulu entered active politics in 1994 after leaving government service. He was elected as a member of the Legislative Assembly from the Achampet Assembly constituency on a Telugu Desam Party (TDP) ticket. He went on to win re-election in 1999 and 2009, serving three terms as MLA. During this period, he also held the portfolio of Minister for Sports and Youth Services in the Cabinet of Chief Minister N. Chandrababu Naidu.

After the formation of Telangana state, he joined the Bharat Rashtra Samithi (then TRS). In the 2019 Indian general election, he was elected to the 17th Lok Sabha from the Nagarkurnool (Lok Sabha constituency) as a BRS candidate.

On 29 February 2024, Ramulu joined the Bharatiya Janata Party (BJP) at the party headquarters in New Delhi, in the presence of Union Minister of State Rajeev Chandrasekhar, BJP National Secretary and Telangana in-charge Tarun Chugh, BJP Parliamentary Board member K. Laxman, and National Vice-President D. K. Aruna.

In the 2024 Indian general election, the BJP nominated his son, Bharath Prasad Pothuganti, as its candidate from Nagarkurnool Lok Sabha constituency. Ramulu did not contest the election.

== Electoral performance ==
Year	Constituency	Party	Result
1994	Achampet Assembly constituency	Telugu Desam Party	Elected
1999	Achampet Assembly constituency	Telugu Desam Party	Elected
2009	Achampet Assembly constituency	Telugu Desam Party	Elected
2019	Nagarkurnool (Lok Sabha constituency)	Bharat Rashtra Samithi	Elected (MP)

== Personal life ==
Ramulu is married and has children, including Bharath Prasad Pothuganti, who was nominated by the Bharatiya Janata Party as its candidate for the Nagarkurnool (Lok Sabha constituency) in the 2024 Indian general election.

== See also ==
- Nagarkurnool (Lok Sabha constituency)
- Achampet Assembly constituency
- Bharatiya Janata Party
- Bharat Rashtra Samithi
- Telugu Desam Party
