= Mallu Ravi =

Indian politician

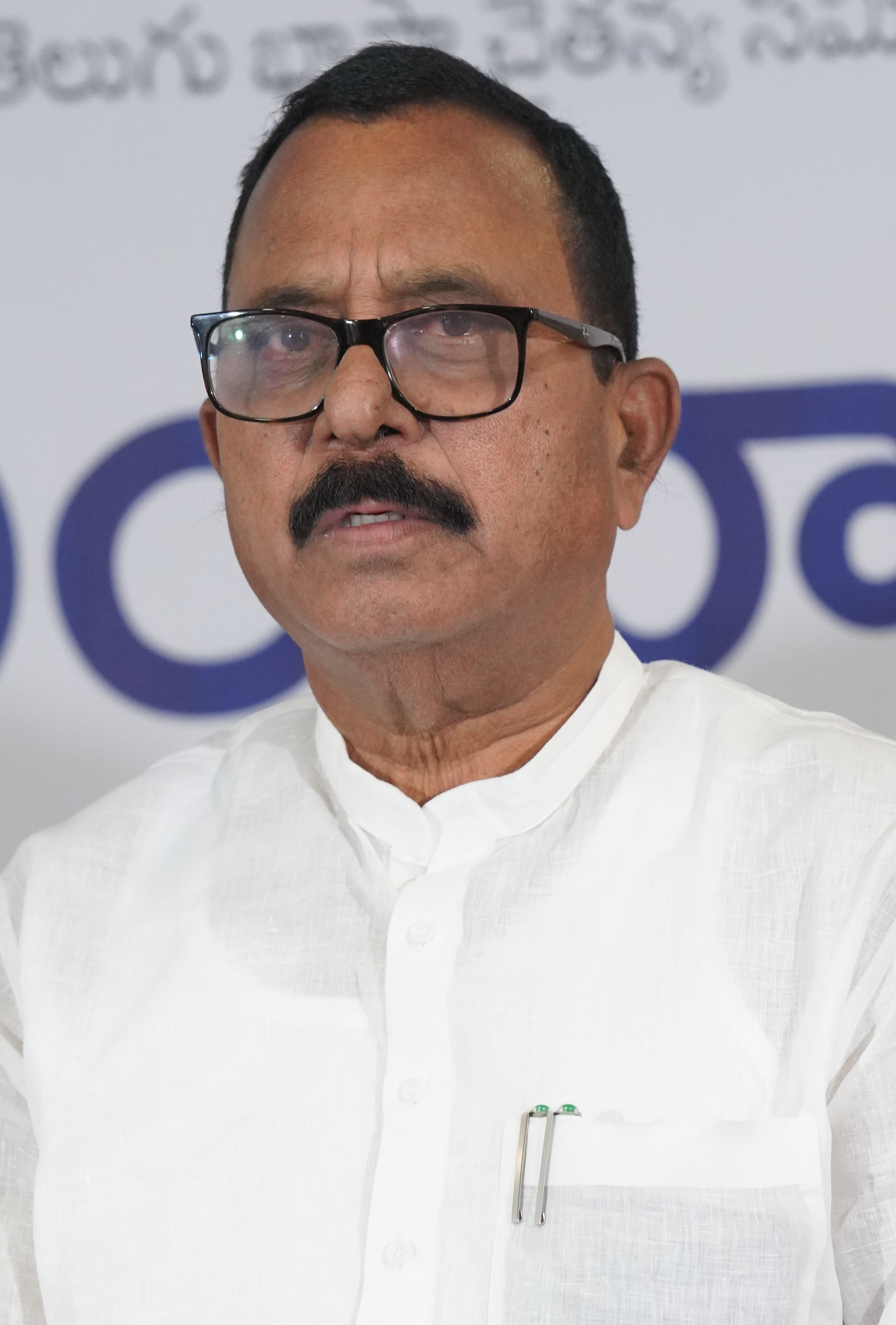

Member of Parliament, Lok Sabha
- Incumbent
- Assumed office 4 June 2024
- Preceded by: Pothuganti Ramulu
- Constituency: Nagarkurnool
- In office 10 March 1998 – 26 April 1999
- Preceded by: Manda Jagannath
- Succeeded by: Manda Jagannath
- Constituency: Nagarkurnool
- In office 20 June 1991 – 12 May 1996
- Preceded by: Manda Jagannath
- Succeeded by: Manda Jagannath
- Constituency: Nagarkurnool

Member of Legislative Assembly Andhra Pradesh
- In office 31 May 2008 – 16 May 2009
- Preceded by: C. Laxma Reddy
- Succeeded by: M. Chandra Shekar
- Constituency: Jadcherla

Personal details
- Born: 14 July 1950 (age 75) Hyderabad, India
- Party: Indian National Congress
- Spouse: Dr.Raja Bansi Devi Mallu
- Parent(s): Akhilanda, Manikyamma

Mallu Ravi is an Indian politician. He is the Senior Vice President of Telangana Pradesh Congress Committee. He was a Member of Parliament in 13th Lok Sabha. He was Andhra Pradesh State Government's special representative in Delhi.

Mallu Ravi was appointed as Telangana Pradesh Congress Committee Disciplinary Action Committee chairman on 29 May 2025 by All India Congress Committee (AICC).

== Career ==
Mallu Ravi started his career with the Congress party as a student leader. He was MP for Nagar Kurnool in 1991-1996 and 1998-1999 but lost his seat in 1999. He contested the seat for Jedcherlla in elections in 2008 by-election and won in the by-election. He contested 2009 and 2014 General Elections but he lost both times by more than 20,000 votes. At present he is appointed Sr.Vice President For TPCC.

Mallu Ravi has been appointed as the special representative of the Telangana Government in New Delhi on 20 January 2024. In the 2024 Indian general election, Ravi was elected to the 18th Lok Sabha from the Nagarkurnool (Lok Sabha constituency) as a candidate of the Indian National Congress, defeating Bharath Prasad Pothuganti of the Bharatiya Janata Party and R. S. Praveen Kumar of the Bharat Rashtra Samithi.

== Personal life ==
Mallu Ravi is married to the daughter of former congressman and minister Koneru Ranga Rao. He has two brothers one is A.R Mallu who was 2-time MP from Nagarkurnool. Another is Mallu Bhatti Vikramarka who is Deputy Chief Minister of Telangana state.

== Electoral performance ==
Election	Constituency	Party	Result	Votes %	Opposition Candidate	Opposition Party	Opposition vote %	Ref
1991	Nagarkurnool	INC	Won	44.74%	Manda Jagannath	TDP	36.06%	
1996	Nagarkurnool	INC	Lost	38.58%	Manda Jagannath	TDP	48.68%	
1998	Nagarkurnool	INC	Won	42.82%	Manda Jagannath	TDP	40.26%	
1999	Nagarkurnool	INC	Lost	53.11%	Manda Jagannath	TDP	44.87%	
2008 (Bye Election)	Jadcherla	INC	Won	37.43%	M.Chandra Shekar	TDP	35.68%	
2009	Jadcherla	INC	Lost	38.03%	M.Chandra Shekar	TDP	47.68%	
2014	Jadcherla	INC	Lost	38.21%	C. Laxma Reddy	BRS	48.27%	
2018	Jadcherla	INC	Lost	30.85%	C. Laxma Reddy	BRS	58.95%	
2019	Nagarkurnool	INC	Lost	31.31%	Pothuganti Ramulu	BRS	50.48%	
2024	Nagarkurnool	INC	Won	38.14%	Pothuganti Bharath	BJP	30.40%	
