= Chikkudu Vamshi Krishna =

Indian politician (born 1964)

Chikkudu Vamshi Krishna (born 1964) is an Indian politician from Telangana. He won the 2023 Telangana Legislative Assembly election from Achampet Constituency, reserved for SC community, in Nagarkurnool district on Indian National Congress ticket.

== Early life and education ==
Krishna is from Nagarkurnool district, Telangana. He is the son of late Balaiah. He married Anuradha, also a medical doctor, and together they have two children, Yeshwanth and Yekthamukhi. After completing his MBBS, he studied post-graduation in surgery at the NTR University of Health Sciences, Vijayawada, passing out in 1997.

== Career ==
Krishna is a senior Congress leader from late nineties. He contested as MLA from Achampet in the 1999 Andhra Pradesh Legislative Assembly Election for the first time but lost to P. Ramulu of TDP by a margin of 12,346 votes. In the 2004 Andhra Pradesh Legislative Assembly Election, he defeated the same candidate by 20,665 votes. Later, he contested the Achampet seat on Congress ticket but lost all the three elections in 2009, 2014 and 2018. In the 2023 Telangana Legislative Assembly Election, he defeated BRS candidate Guvvala Balaraju, to whom he lost in the previous two elections by a huge margin of 49,326 votes.

He was appointed as Telangana Pradesh Congress Committee (TPCC) Vice President on 9 June 2025.

Vamshi Krishna Was appointed as Nagarkurnool District Congress Committee (DCC) President on 22 November 2025.

== Rare surgery ==
Krishna, who is a qualified surgeon, performed a surgery at the Achampet Government Hospital, along with his team and removed a 10-kg tumor from a woman's body, potentially saving her life.
