= Maldakal =

- Mandal
- Location within Telangana Location within India
- Coordinates: 16.123°N 77.696°E
- Country: India
- State: Telangana
- District: Jogulamba Gadwal

Languages
  - Official: Telugu
- Time zone: UTC+5:30 (IST)
- Vehicle registration: TS 33
- Climate: hot (Köppen)

Maldakal is a Mandal in Jogulamba Gadwal district of Telangana state

== Villages ==
The villages in Maldakal mandal include: 1.Adiviravalcheru 2.Amaravai 3.Bijjawar 4.Cherlagarlapadu 5.Dasaripally 6.Kurthiravalcher 7.Maddelabanda 8.Maldakal 9.Mallamdoddi 10.Mangampet 11.Mekalasompally 12.Nagardoddi 13.Neelivanipally 14.Neethuvanipally 15.Palwai 16.Pavanampally 17.Peddapally 18.Peddathanda 19.Peddadoddi 20.Peddapally 21.Saddalonpally 22.Thatikunta 23.Uligapally 24.Vittalapuram 25.Yelkur About the Village : The village is located 18 km from the Gadwal Taluk. This village is very famous for Lord Timmappa Temple, a famous temple in Jogulamba Gadwal district. It belongs to The lord Venkateswara. The local people call the lord as Maldkal Timmappa. He is famous god in around villages. Every year the people celebrate Maldkal Timmappa Jathara (Tirunala) on December Pournami. Devotees from different places, like Karnataka and Maharashtra attend the Jathara. It is an estimated that every year nearly 20 lakh devotees take darsanam. There is a local story related to Tirupati Lord. Balaji with Lord Timmappa.
