= Laxmipuram, Srikakulam =

Laxmipuram Laxmipuram
- village
- Interactive map of Laxmipuram
- Location in Telangana, India
- Country: India
- State: Andhra Pradesh
- District: Srikakulam
- Elevation: 10 m (33 ft)

Population (2011)
  - Total: 1,200

Languages
  - Official: Telugu
- Time zone: UTC+5:30 (IST)
- PIN: 532220
- Telephone code: 08947 239250
- Vehicle registration: AP-30
- Nearest city: palasa
- Literacy: 45%
- Lok Sabha constituency: Srikakulam
- Vidhan Sabha constituency: Palasa
- Climate: temperate (Köppen)

Laxmipuram is a small village in Palasa mandal, Srikakulam district, Andhra Pradesh, India. It is one of the daveloping villages in Palasa Mandal. Most of the people in this village are farmers or government employees. The village has a high literacy rate. Younger residents have begun to move out of the village to more urban areas including nearby city, Khammam. The village risks population loss as many continue to emigrate leaving older populations behind.
