= Manopadu =

Coordinates: 15°57′50″N 77°56′28″E

- village
- Interactive map of Manopadu
- Country: India
- State: Telangana
- District: Jogulamba Gadwal

Languages
  - Official: Telugu
- Time zone: UTC+5:30 (IST)
- PIN: 509128
- Vehicle registration: TS-33
- Nearest city: Gadwal, Kurnool
- Lok Sabha constituency: Nagarkurnool
- Vidhan Sabha constituency: Alampur
- Climate: hot (Köppen)
- Website: telangana.gov.in

Manopad or Manopadu is a Mandal in Jogulamba Gadwal district, Telangana.

== Villages ==
The villages in Manopadu Mandal include:

- A. Burdipadu
- Amaravai
- Bonkuru
- Boravelli
- Chandrashekar Nagar
- Chennipadu
- Chinnaamudyalapadu
- Chinnapothulapadu
- Gokulapadu
- Paipadu
- Itikyalapadu
- Jallapuram
- Kalugotla
- Kalukuntla
- Kanchupadu
- Korvipadu
- Madduru
- Manopadu
- Mennipadu
- Narayanapur
- Pallepadu
- Peddaamudyalapadu
- Peddapothulapadu
- Pulluru
- Undavelly

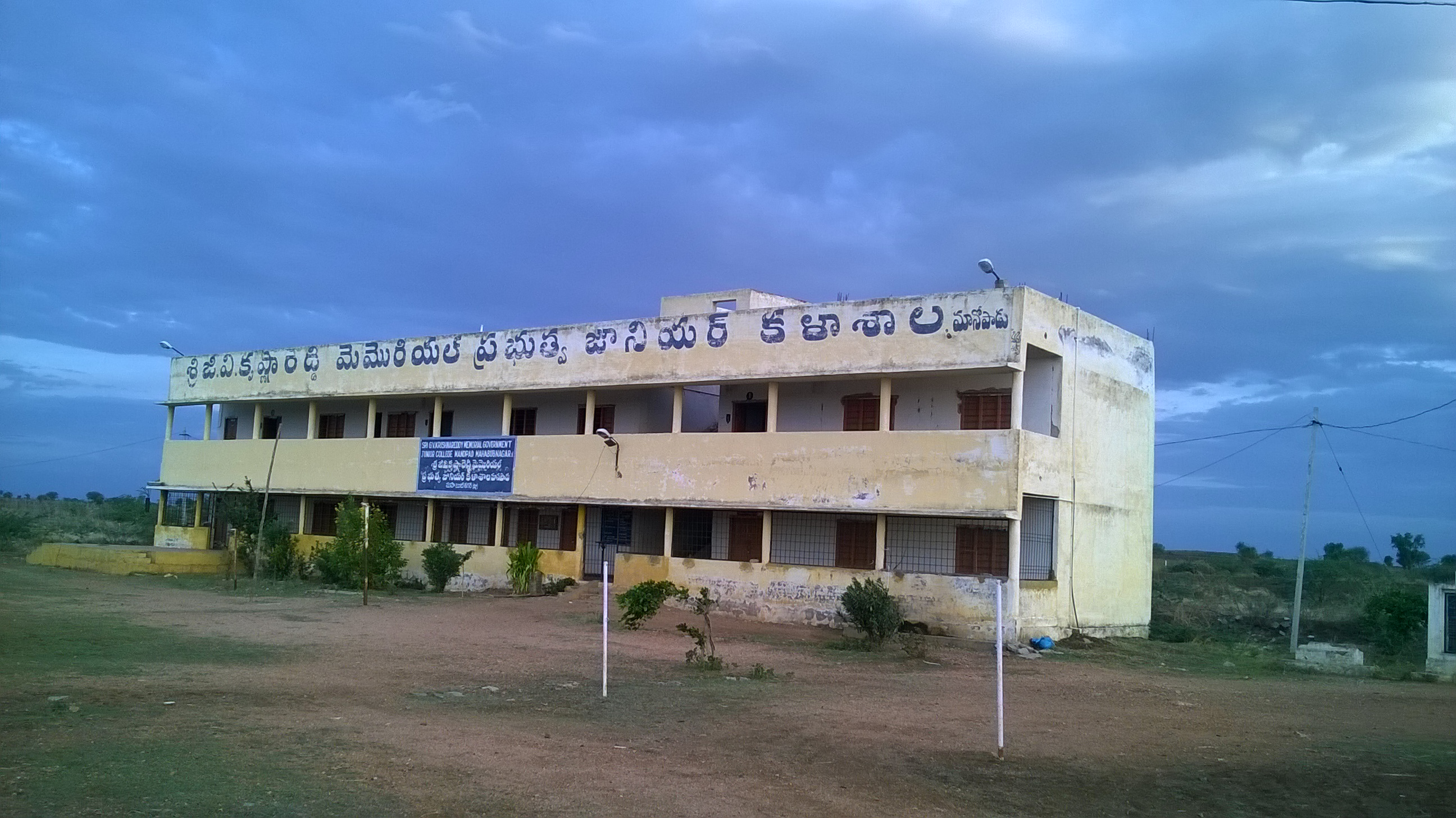
GVK Reddy Memorial Junior College, Manopad
