= Veltoor =

- Village
- Interactive map of Veltoor
- Coordinates: 16°28′33″N 77°57′14″E
- Country: India
- State: Telangana
- District: Wanaparthy

Languages
  - Official: Telugu
- Time zone: UTC+5:30 (IST)

Veltoor (also Romanized as Velatoor, Velatur or Veltur) is a village and gram panchayat in Peddamandadi mandal of Wanaparthy district of Telangana in India.
