= Itikial =

Itikyal
- village
- Location in telangana, India Itikyal (India)
- Coordinates: 18°55′23″N 78°46′32″E
- Country: India
- State: టెలంగన

Languages
  - Official: Telugu
- Time zone: UTC+5:30 (IST)
- Lok Sabha constituency: Nizamabad
- Vidhan Sabha constituency: Jagtial

Itikial (also Itikyala) is a village in Raikal mandal, Jagtial district, Telangana, India. The village is about 65 km from the district headquarters at Jagityal, at an average elevation of 264 metres (866 ft) above sea level.

As of the 2001 Indian census, Itikyall had a population of 12,400. Males constitute 48% of the population and females 52%. Itikial has an average literacy rate of 63%, higher than the national average of 59.5%. Male literacy is 75%, and female literacy is 51%.
