= Ghattu =

- village
- Nickname: BangaruGhattu
- Location within Telangana Location within India
- Coordinates: 16°06′N 77°34′E
- Country: India
- State: Telangana
- District: Jogulamba Gadwal

Telugu, Kannada languages
  - Official: Telugu
- Time zone: UTC+5:30 (IST)
- Postal code: 509129
- Vehicle registration: TS33
- Climate: hot (Köppen)

Ghattu is a Mandal in the Jogulamba Gadwal district in Telangana, India.

It is one of the under-developed villages in the Jogulamba Gadwal district. Ghattu is a mandal by its category but originally it is unaware of the developments. It has begun to see the developmental activities performed by the government.

The major festivals celebrated here are namely Dussehra, Eruvaka, Muharram, etc. Irrespective of the religions, people on these days gather together to share their feelings and express gratitude towards each other. Regionally, on every Wednesday, the village panchayat conducts market stalls. People from different villages around this mandal come to buy their basic needs.

== Institutions ==
- Zilla Parishad High School
- 2 primary schools
- Government Model School
- Government Junior College (T/M)
- GROUPS: CEC, HEC.

== Villages ==
The villages in Ghattu mandal include:

- Aloor
- Aragidda
- Balgera
- Boyalagudem
- Chagadona
- Chintalakunta
- Ersandoddi
- Ghattu
- Gorlakhandoddi
- Induvasi
- Kuchinerla
- Lingapoor
- Macherla
- Mallampally
- Mallapuram
- Mittadoddi
- Penchikalpahad
- Rayapuram
- Thappetlamorsu
- Thummalapally
- Thummalcheruvu
- Yellamdoddi
