= Vijayudu =

Indian politician

Vijayudu (born 1977) is an Indian politician from Telangana state. He is an MLA from Alampur Assembly constituency which is reserved for SC community in Jogulamba Gadwal district. He represents Bharat Rashtra Samithi Party and won the 2023 Telangana Legislative Assembly election.

== Early life and education ==
Vijayudu is from Pullur village, Undavelli Mandal, Jogulamba Gadwal District. His father, Savaranna, was a farmer. He studied only till Class 10. He worked as a field assistant in NREGS.

== Career ==
Vijayudu won from Alampur Assembly constituency representing Bharat Rashtra Samithi in the 2023 Telangana Legislative Assembly election. He polled 104,060 votes, and defeated his nearest rival S. A. Sampath Kumar of Indian National Congress by a margin of 30,573 votes.
