= Lingal =

Indian tehsil

- Mandal
- Location in Telangana, India Lingal (India)
- Coordinates: 16.2833°N 78.5167°E
- Country: India
- State: Telangana
- District: Nagarkurnool
- Elevation: 444 m (1,457 ft)

Languages
  - Official: Telugu
- Time zone: UTC+5:30 (IST)
- Vehicle registration: TS-22
- Vidhan Sabha constituency: Achampet
- Climate: Hot (Köppen)

Lingal is a mandal in Nagarkurnool district, Telangana, India.

== Geography ==
Lingal has an average elevation of 444 metres (1,457 ft).

== Institutions ==
- Andhra Pradesh Social Welfare Residential School
- Netaji Vidyaniketan Upper Primary School
- Zilla Parishad High School

== Villages ==
The villages in Lingal mandal include:

- Ambatpally
- Appaipally
- Ausalikunta
- Chennampally
- Dhararam
- Jeelugupally
- Komatikunta
- Kothakuntapally
- Lingal
- Rayavaram
- Shainpet
- Surapur
- Vallabhapur
- Rampur
- Bakaram
- Manajipet
