= Jogulamba Gadwal district =

- District of Telangana
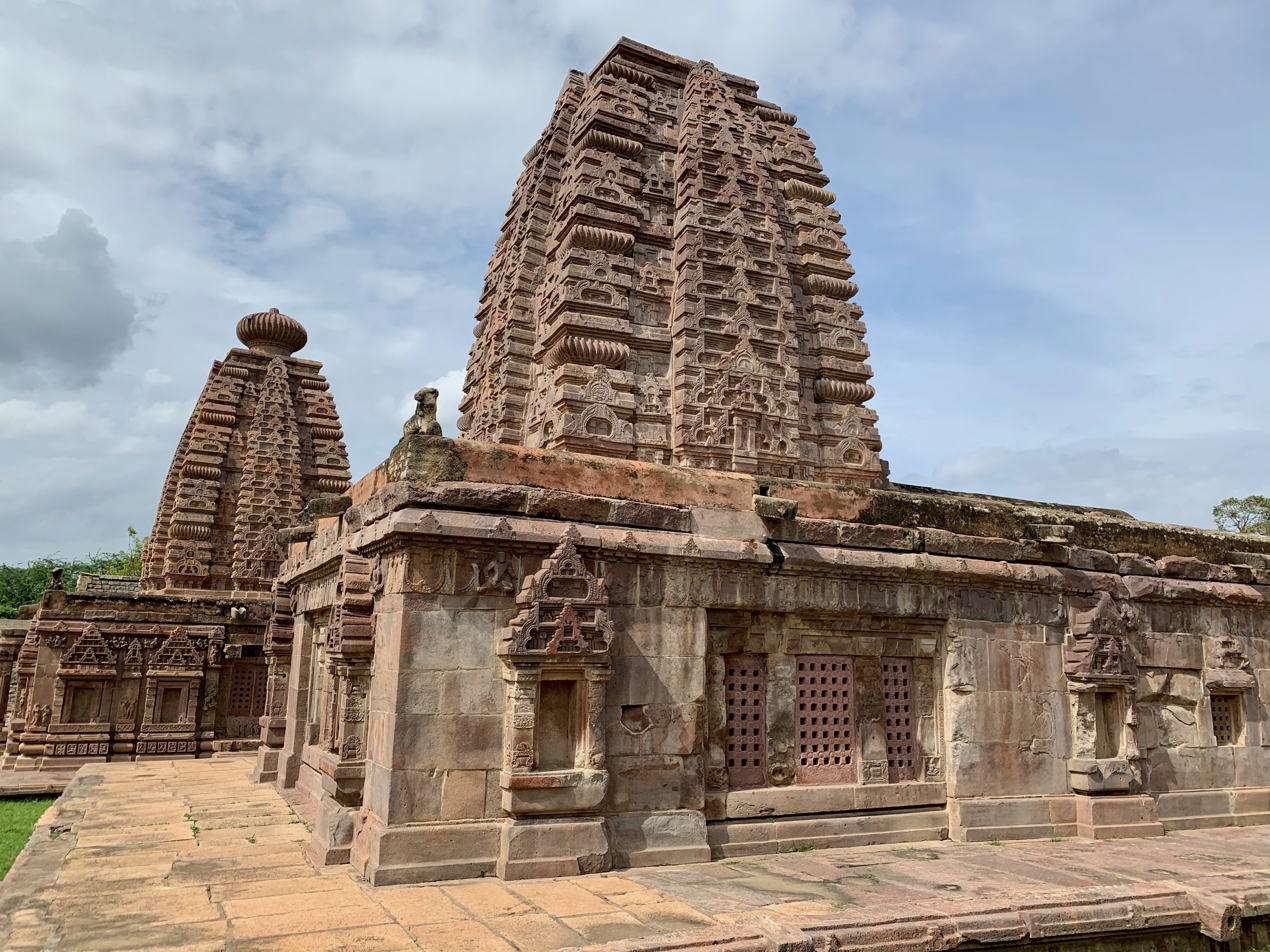
- Vishwa Brahma and Veera Brahma Temples, Alampuram
- Interactive map of Jogulamba Gadwal district
- Country: India
- State: Telangana
- Named for: Goddess Jogulamba
- Headquarters: Gadwal
- Mandalas: 19

Government
  - District Collector: Sri B.M. Santhosh, IAS
  - Parliament constituencies: 1

Area
  - Total: 2,928 km^{2} (1,131 sq mi)

Population (2011)
  - Total: 609,990
  - Density: 208.3/km^{2} (539.6/sq mi)
  - Urban: Gadwal(85,245)

Demographics
  - Literacy: 49.87%
  - Sex ratio: 972
- Time zone: UTC+05:30 (IST)
- Vehicle registration: TG–33
- Major highways: 2
- Average annual precipitation: 2014–15 564.6 mm
- Website: gadwal.telangana.gov.in

Jogulamba Gadwal district is a district in the Indian state of Telangana. The administrative headquarters of the district is located at Gadwal. Jogulamba Gadwal district is located in western southern part of the state. The district shares boundaries with Narayanpet, Wanaparthy districts and with the state boundary of Andhra Pradesh and Karnataka.

The district is spread over an area of 2,928 square kilometres (1,131 sq mi). As of the 2011 Census of India, the area within the district had a population of 609,990.

== Administrative divisions ==
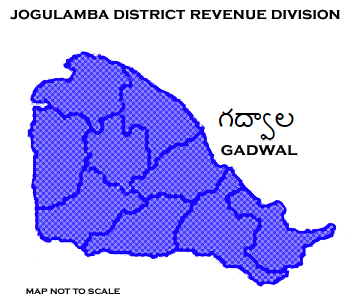
Jogulamba District Revenue division

The district has one revenue division, Gadwal, and is sub-divided into 12 mandals.

=== Mandals ===
Sr No.	Gadwal revenue division
1	Alampur
2	Dharoor
3	Gadwal
4	Ghattu
5	Ieeja
6	Itikyala
7	Kaloor Thimmanadoddi
8	Maldakal
9	Manopad
10	Rajoli
11	Undavelly
12	Waddepally
13	Yerravalli

== Demographics ==
Religions in Jogulamba Gadwal district (2011)
Religion	Percent
Hinduism	91.29%
Islam	7.96%
Other or not stated	0.75%
Distribution of religions

The district has a population of 6,09,990 of which 3,09,274 are males and 3,00,716 females for a sex ratio of 972 females per 1000 males. The literacy rate is 49.87%. Urban population is 63,177 (10.36%). Scheduled Castes and Scheduled Tribes made up 120,639 (19.77%) and 9376 (1.54%) of the population respectively.

Languages of Jogulamba Gadwal district (2011)
1. Telugu (90.1%)
2. Urdu (7.49%)
3. Others (2.42%)

At the time of the 2011 census, 90.09% of the population spoke Telugu and 7.49% Urdu as their first language.

== See also ==
- List of districts in Telangana
