= Mahabubabad Assembly constituency =

Constituency of the Telangana legislative assembly in India

Coordinates: 17.60°N 80.00°E

Mahabubabad
- Constituency No. 102 for the Telangana Legislative Assembly
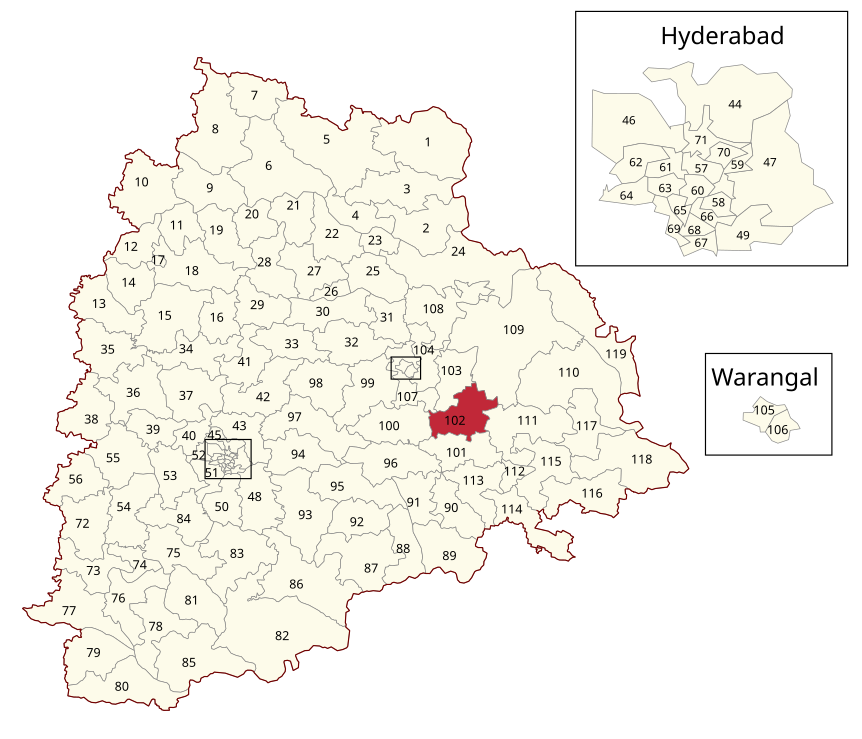
- Location of Mahabubabad Assembly constituency within Telangana

Constituency details
- Country: India
- Region: South India
- State: Telangana
- District: Warangal
- Lok Sabha constituency: Mahabubabad
- Established: 1951
- Total electors: 2,11,758
- Reservation: ST

Member of Legislative Assembly
- 3rd Telangana Legislative Assembly
- Incumbent [Harsha vardan]
- Party: INC

Mahabubabad Assembly constituency is constituency of Telangana Legislative Assembly, India. It is one among 12 constituencies in Warangal district. It is part of Mahabubabad Lok Sabha constituency, and is reserved for members of the Scheduled Tribes.

Harsha vardan of Indian National Congress is representing the constituency.

== Mandals ==
The Assembly Constituency presently comprises the following mandals:

Mandal
Mahabubabad
Nellikudur
Kesamudram
Gudur (Mahabubabad district)
Inugurthy

== Members of the Legislative Assembly ==
Duration	Member	Political party
Andhra Pradesh
1952–57	Kankanti Srinivas Rao	People's Democratic Front
1952–57	B.M. Chander Rao	Scheduled Caste Federation
1967–72	T. Satyanarayan	Communist Party of India
1972–78	Jannareddy Janardhan Reddy	Indian National Congress
1978–83	Jannareddy Janardhan Reddy	Indian National Congress
1983–85	Jannareddy Janardhan Reddy	Indian National Congress
1985–89	Jannareddy Janardhan Reddy	Indian National Congress
1989–94	Jannareddy Janardhan Reddy	Indian National Congress
1994–99	Bandi Pullaiah	Communist Party of India
1999–04	Bhadraiah Sreeram	Telugu Desam Party
2004–09	Vem Narender Reddy	Telugu Desam Party
2009–14	Maloth Kavitha	Indian National Congress
Telangana
2014–2018	Banoth Shankar Nayak	Telangana Rashtra Samithi
2018–2023		Telangana Rashtra Samithi
2023–	Dr. Murali Naik	Indian National Congress

== Election results ==
=== 2023 ===
2023 Telangana Legislative Assembly election: Mahabubabad
Party	Candidate	Votes	%	±%
INC	Murali Naik	1,16,644		
BRS	Banoth Shankar Nayak	66,473		
BJP	Jathoth Hussain Naik	34,225		
NOTA	None of the Above	1,932		
Majority		50,171		
Turnout		2,08,500		
INC hold		Swing		

=== 2018 ===
2018 Telangana Legislative Assembly election: Mahabubabad
Party	Candidate	Votes	%	±%
TRS	Banoth Shankar Nayak	85,397	46.18%	
INC	Porika Balram Naik	71,863	38.86%	
BJP	Jathoth Hussain Naik	11,646	6.30%	
Independent	Battu Binama	4,819	2.61%	
NOTA	None of the Above	3,279	1.77%	
Majority		13,534		
Turnout		1,84,940	85.06%	
TRS hold		Swing		

=== 2014 ===
2014 Telangana Legislative Assembly election: Mahabubabad
Party	Candidate	Votes	%	±%
TRS	Banoth Shankar Nayak	78,370	44.78%	
INC	Kavitha Malothu	69,055	39.45%	
TDP	Balu Chowan Moodu	35,680	8.96%	
Majority		9,315		
Turnout		1,75,027	82.65%	
TRS gain from INC		Swing		

== See also ==
- List of constituencies of Telangana Legislative Assembly
