= Nanchari Madur =

- Mandal/town
- Nickname: Madur
- Location in Telangana, India Nanchari Madur (India)
- Coordinates: 17.5857°N 79.6578°E
- Country: India
- State: Telangana
- District: Mahabubabad district
- Talukas: Mahabubabad
- Elevation: 302 m (991 ft)

Population
  - Total: 19,000 according to 2,011 census now ~44,000

Languages
  - Official: Telugu
- Time zone: UTC+5:30 (IST)
- PIN: 506317
- Telephone code +91: 08719
- Vehicle registration: TS 26 Mahabubabad
- Website: www.thorrur.com

Nanchari Madur is one of the villages in Thorrur mandal, and a town in Mahabubabad district of Telangana, India. It is located on Jayaprakash Narayana road between Warangal and Khammam. It is at about 50 km from Warangal and 70 km from Khammam. It is a rapidly growing town due to its location. The distance between Hyderabad to Nanchari Madur is 141 km. Sarpanch - Sri Bangaru Ramesh Garu

== Nearby mandals ==
Kodakandla, Peddavangara Palakurthi, Thorrur, Wardhannapet, Maripeda, Parvathagiri, Mahabubabad, Warangal.

== Temples ==
Shiva, Dhurga Maatha, Durga Matha temple, Hanuman, Katamaiah, yellama and Bodrai Temple. Church and Mosque
