= Vem Narender Reddy =

Indian politician

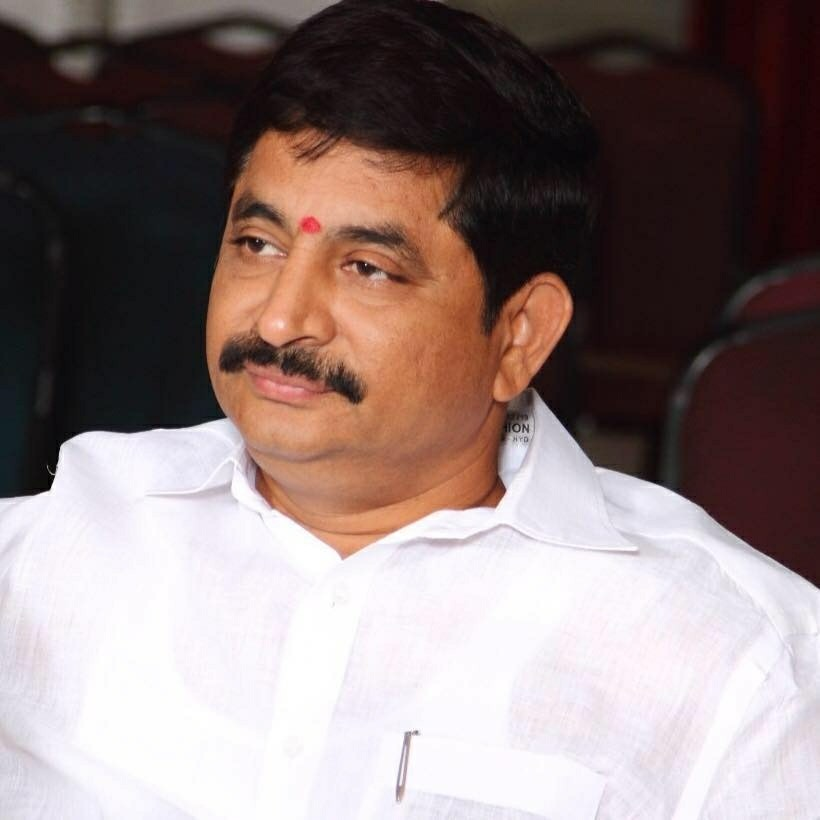

Member of Parliament, Rajya Sabha
- Incumbent
- Assumed office 10 April 2026
- Preceded by: K. R. Suresh Reddy
- Constituency: Telangana

Member of Andhra Pradesh Legislative Assembly
- In office 20 May 2004 – 25 May 2009
- Preceded by: Bhadraiah Sreeram
- Succeeded by: Maloth Kavitha
- Constituency: Mahabubabad

Personal details
- Born: 1960 (age 65–66) Arpanapalle, Kesamudram Mandal, Mahabubabad District, Telangana
- Party: Indian National Congress
- Other political affiliations: Telugu Desam Party
- Spouse: Vijaya Lakshmi
- Children: Dr Krishna Bhargava Vem, Krishna Keerthan Vem
- Parent(s): Vem Chenna Krishna Reddy, Venkatamma
- Education: B.A

Vem Narender Reddy is an Indian politician from Telangana. He is a member of the Indian National Congress (INC) and serves as a Member of Parliament in the Rajya Sabha, the Upper House of the Parliament of India, representing Telangana. He previously served as a Member of the Andhra Pradesh Legislative Assembly, representing the Mahabubabad Assembly constituency. He is a senior leader of the Indian National Congress.

== Political career ==
Vem Narender Reddy started his political journey with the Telugu Desam Party and contested elections from Mahabubabad Assembly constituency in 2004 Assembly polls and elected as MLA. He Unsuccessfully contested by elections held in 2010 for Warangal West Assembly constituency. In 2015 he contested as MLC under TDP ticket and lost.

Narender Reddy resigned from the primary membership From TDP party 28 October 2017 later joined the Indian National Congress on 31 October 2017 along with Revanth Reddy in the presence of AICC Vice-president Rahul Gandhi at New Delhi. On 26 June 2021, he was appointed as vice president of Telangana Pradesh Congress Committee (TPCC).

Narender Reddy have been appointed as coordination and administration, Election Commission rules and regulations, calendar programmer and intimations and organization and coordination with DCC presidents and mandal committees in 2023 Assembly Elections. He was appointed as Advisor to Chief Minister (Public Affairs) by Government of Telangana in the rank and status of Minister of State in the state on 20 January 2024.

On 4 March 2026, Vem Narender Reddy was announced as the Congress party candidate from Telangana for the 2026 Rajya Sabha elections, which he won unopposed.

== Electoral history ==
Year	Constituency	Party	Votes	Opponent		Result	Margin
2004	Mahabubabad	TDP	50,373	Janata Party	Jannareddy Bharath Chand Reddy	Won	3,263
2010 (By-election)	Warangal West	TDP	15,221	TRS	Dasyam Vinay Bhaskar	Lost	-59,303
2015 (MLC Election)	MLAs Quota	TDP	—	TRS	Kadiyam Srihari (and others)	Lost	—
2026 (Rajya Sabha)	Telangana	INC	Won Unopposed				

== Controversies ==
A case was registered against him in connection with the cash for vote scam on 30 May 2015. When he was contesting as MLC from TDP, the other TDP MLA Revanth Reddy caught by the Anti-Corruption Bureau (ACB) officials while he was trying to give cash to the Nominated MLA Elvis Stephenson for voting in Favour of Vem Narender Reddy.
