= Yellampet =

Coordinates: 17°27′N 79°52′E

- Village
- Interactive map of Yellampet
- Country: India
- State: Telangana
- District: Mahabubabad
- Metro: Mahabubabad district
- Talukas: Maripeda

Government
  - Body: Mandal Office

Area
  - Total: 17 km^{2} (6.6 sq mi)
  - Rank: 2

Population
  - Total: 3,678
  - Rank: 1
  - Density: 220/km^{2} (560/sq mi)

Languages
  - Official: Telugu
- Time zone: UTC+5:30 (IST)
- PIN: 506315
- Lok Sabha constituency: Mahabubabad
- Vidhan Sabha constituency: Maripeda
- Planning agency: Panchayat
- Civic agency: Mandal Office

Yellampet is a village and panchayat in Mahabubabad district, TS, India. It comes under Maripeda mandal.
