= Mahabubabad Lok Sabha constituency =

Lok Sabha Constituency in Telangana

Coordinates: 17.6°N 80.0°E

Mahabubabad TG-16
- Lok Sabha constituency
- Mahabubabad Lok Sabha constituency in Telangana

Constituency details
- Country: India
- Region: South India
- State: Telangana
- Assembly constituencies: Dornakal; Mahabubabad; Narsampet; Mulug; Pinapaka; Yellandu; Bhadrachalam
- Established: 1957; Abolished in 1967; Re-established in 2009
- Total electors: 15,32,366 (2024)
- Reservation: ST

Member of Parliament
- 18th Lok Sabha
- Incumbent Balram Naik
- Party: INC
- Elected year: 2024

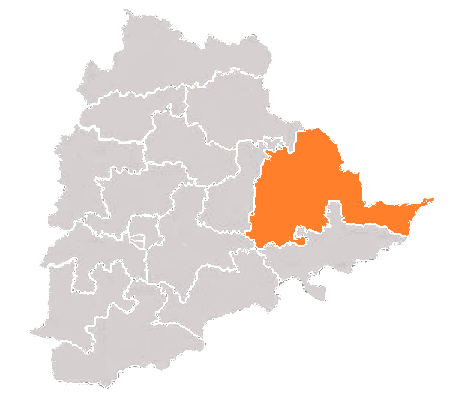
Map of the Indian Loksabha constituency of Mahabubabad, Telangana

Mahabubabad Lok Sabha constituency is one of the 17 Lok Sabha (Lower House of the Parliament) constituencies in Telangana state in southern India. This constituency is reserved for the candidates belonging to the Scheduled tribes

Balram Naik of Indian National Congress is currently representing the constituency for second time.

== History ==
The constituency came into existence in 2008, following the implementation of delimitation of parliamentary constituencies based on the recommendations of the Delimitation Commission of India constituted in 2002.

== Assembly segments ==
Mahabubabad Lok Sabha constituency comprises the following Legislative Assembly segments:

No	Name	District	Member	Party	Leading (in 2024)
101	Dornakal (ST)	Mahabubabad	Jatoth Ram Chander Naik	INC	INC
102	Mahabubabad (ST)	Mahabubabad	Dr. Murali Naik Bhukya	INC	INC
103	Narsampet	Warangal	Donthi Madhava Reddy	INC	INC
109	Mulug (ST)	Mulugu	Dansari Anasuya	INC	INC
110	Pinapaka (ST)	Bhadradri Kothagudem	Payam Venkateswarlu	INC	INC
111	Yellandu (ST)	Bhadradri Kothagudem	Koram Kanakaiah	INC	INC
119	Bhadrachalam (ST)	Bhadradri Kothagudem	Dr. Tellam Venkata Rao	BRS	INC

== Members of Parliament ==
Year	Member	Party
1952-1957 : Constituency did not exist
Andhra Pradesh
1957	Etikala Madhusudan Rao	Indian National Congress
1962	Etikala Madhusudan Rao	Indian National Congress
1965^	Surendra Reddy	Indian National Congress
1967-2008 : Constituency did not exist
2009	Balram Naik	Indian National Congress
Telangana
2014	Azmeera Seetaram Naik	Telangana Rashtra Samithi
2019	Kavitha Maloth	Telangana Rashtra Samithi
2024	Balram Naik	Indian National Congress

== Election results ==
=== General election, 2024 ===
2024 Indian general election: Mahabubabad
Party	Candidate	Votes	%	±%
INC	Balram Naik Porika	612,774	55.27	▲23.20
BRS	Kavitha Maloth	263,609	23.77	▼23.21
BJP	Azmeera Seetaram Naik	110,444	9.96	▲7.37
AIFB	Mypathi Arun Kumar	39,139	3.53	N/A
NOTA	None of the above	6,591	0.59	
Majority		349,165	31.50	▲16.58
Turnout		1,108,786	71.85	▲2.79
INC gain from BRS		Swing		

=== General election, 2019 ===
2019 Indian general election: Mahabubabad
Party	Candidate	Votes	%	±%
TRS	Kavitha Maloth	462,109	46.98	
INC	Balram Naik	3,15,446	32.07	
TJS	Arun Kumar Mypathi	57,073	5.80	New
CPI	Kalluri Venkateswera Rao	45,719	4.65	
BJP	Jatothu Hussain	25,487	2.59	
Majority		1,46,663	14.91	
Turnout		9,83,707	69.06	
TRS hold		Swing		

=== General election, 2014 ===
2014 Indian general elections: Mahabubabad
Party	Candidate	Votes	%	±%
TRS	Prof. Azmeera Seetaram Naik	320,569	28.51	
INC	Balram Naik	2,85,577	25.40	
TDP	Banoth Mohanlal	2,15,904	19.20	
YSRCP	Dr. Tellam Venkata Rao	1,28,472	11.43	
IND.	Payam Chandhar Rao	94,044	8.36	
Majority		34,992	3.11	
Turnout		11,26,618	81.21	+3.47
TRS gain from INC		Swing		

=== General election, 2009 ===
2009 Indian general elections: Mahabubabad
Party	Candidate	Votes	%	±%
INC	Balram Naik	394,447	39.59	
CPI	Kunja Srinivasa Rao	3,25,490	32.67	
PRP	D.T. Naik	1,45,299	14.58	
IND.	Kechela Ranga Reddy	43,164	4.33	
Majority		68,957	6.92	
Turnout		9,96,402	78.74	
INC hold		Swing		

== Trivia ==
- Balram Naik, former Union Minister represented the constituency in 15th Lok Sabha.

== See also ==
- Warangal district
- List of constituencies of the Lok Sabha
