= Dornakal Assembly constituency =

Constituency of the Telangana legislative assembly in India

Coordinates: 17.45°N 80.15°E

Dornakal
- Constituency No. 101 for the Telangana Legislative Assembly
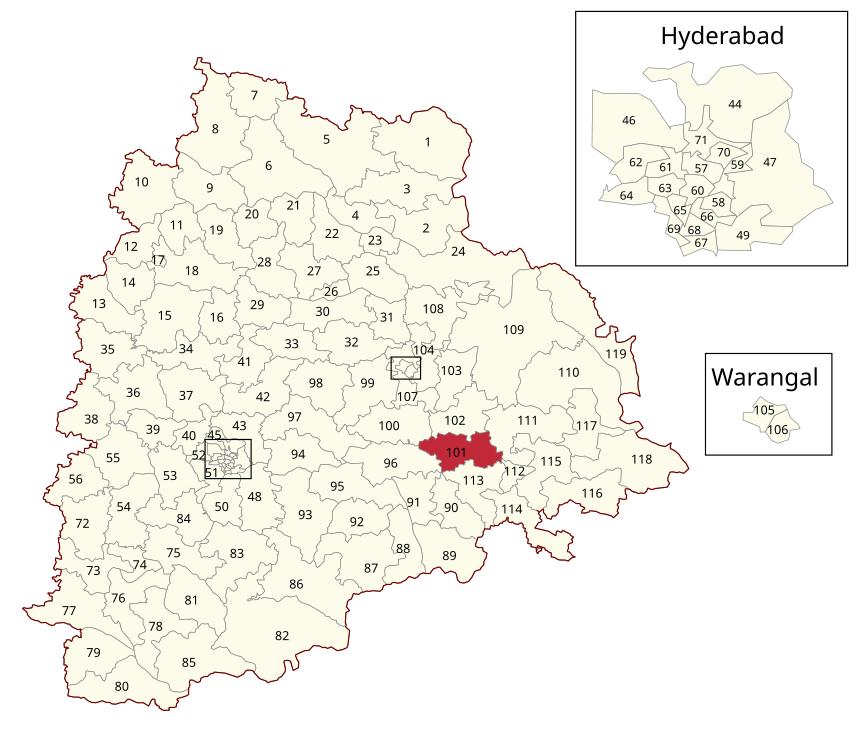
- Location of Dornakal Assembly constituency within Telangana

Constituency details
- Country: India
- Region: South India
- State: Telangana
- District: Mahabubabad
- Lok Sabha constituency: Mahabubabad
- Established: 1951
- Total electors: 1,87,450
- Reservation: ST

Member of Legislative Assembly
- 3rd Telangana Legislative Assembly
- Incumbent Jatoth Ram Chander Naik
- Party: Indian National Congress

Dornakal Assembly constituency is a ST reserved constituency of Telangana Legislative Assembly, India. This region is occupied by more scheduled tribes in highest number. It is one of 12 constituencies in combined Warangal district, and one of the constituencies of Mahabubabad district. It is part of Mahabubabad Lok Sabha constituency.

Ram Chander Naik is the current MLA of the constituency.

== Mandals ==
The Assembly Constituency presently comprises the following Mandals:

Mandal
Dornakal
Maripeda
Narsimhulapet
Kuravi
Chinna Gudur
Danthalapally

== Members of the Legislative Assembly ==
Duration	Member	Political party
Andhra Pradesh
1957–62	N. Ramchandra Reddy	Indian National Congress
1962–67	N. Ramchandra Reddy	Indian National Congress
1967–72	N. Ramchandra Reddy	Indian National Congress
1972–78	N. Ramchandra Reddy	Indian National Congress
1978–83	Ramashayam Surender Reddy	Indian National Congress
1983–85	Ramashayam Surender Reddy	Indian National Congress
1985–89	Ramashayam Surender Reddy	Indian National Congress
1989–94	Dharamsoth Redya Naik	Indian National Congress
1994–99	Dharamsoth Redya Naik	Indian National Congress
1999–04	Dharamsoth Redya Naik	Indian National Congress
2004–09	Dharamsoth Redya Naik	Indian National Congress
2009–14	Satyavathi Rathod	Telugu Desam Party
Telangana
2014–2018	Dharamsoth Redya Naik	Indian National Congress
2018–23	Dharamsoth Redya Naik	Telangana Rashtra Samithi
2023–incumbent	Jatoth Ram Chander Naik	Indian National Congress

== Election results ==
=== Telangana Legislative Assembly election, 2023 ===
Telangana Assembly Elections, 2023: Dornakal (Assembly constituency)
Party	Candidate	Votes	%	±%
INC	Jatoth Ramachandru Naik	115,587	60.01	
BRS	Dharamsoth Redya Naik	62,456	32.42	
Independent	Ratna Azmeera	2,773	1.44	
Independent	Bhukya Gopikrishna	2,244	1.16	
BSP	Guguloth Parvathi Naik	1,892	0.98	
BJP	Bhukya Sangeetha	1,817	0.94	
Telangana Jaghir Party	Ravi Kumar Vankudothu	1,471	0.76	
NOTA	None of the Above	1,471	0.76	
Majority		53,131	27.59	
Turnout		1,92,623		
INC gain from BRS		Swing		

=== Telangana Legislative Assembly election, 2018 ===
2018 Telangana Legislative Assembly election: Dornakal
Party	Candidate	Votes	%	±%
TRS	Dharamsoth Redya Naik	88,307	50.73%	
TDP	Jatoth Ramachandru Naik	70,926	40.74%	
Independent	Banoth Ravinder	4,117	2.37%	
Independent	Bhukya Gopi Krishna	2,107	1.21%	
NOTA	None of the Above	2,036	1.17%	
Majority		17,381		
Turnout		1,74,076	88.96%	
TRS gain from INC		Swing		

=== Telangana Legislative Assembly election, 2014 ===
Telangana Assembly Elections, 2014: Dornakal (Assembly constituency)
Party	Candidate	Votes	%	±%
INC	Dharamsoth Redya Naik	84,170	51.45%	
TRS	Satyavathi Rathod	60,639	37.07%	
TDP	Jatoth Ramachandru Naik	8,384	5.1%	
Majority		23,531		
Turnout		1,63,591	87.27%	
INC gain from TDP		Swing		

== See also ==
- List of constituencies of Telangana Legislative Assembly
