= Rajanpally =

Village in Gudur Mandal, Warangal District, Telangana, India

Rajanpally is a village in Gudur mandal in Mahabubabad district, India. It comes under the Mahabubabad Lok Sabha and assembly constituency.
