= Thorrur =

Thorrur may refer to:

- Thorrur, Ranga Reddy, a village in Telangana, India
- Thorrur, Warangal, a village in Telangana, India
