= Budharaopet =

Budharaopet Budharaopet
- village
- Nickname: BRPT
- Location in Telangana, India Budharaopet (India)
- Coordinates: 17°53′06″N 79°57′29″E
- Country: India
- State: Telangana
- District: Warangal
- Founder: Brahmaiah

Population (2001)
  - Total: 4,827

Languages
  - Official: Telugu
- Time zone: UTC+5:30 (IST)
- Vehicle registration: TS

Budharaopet is a village in Khanapur Mandal of Warangal district in Telangana, India. The population was 4,827 at the 2001 Indian census.

== Geography ==
Budharaopet is located at 17°53′6″N 79°57′29″E.

The village is 8 km from Narsampet on the way to Mahabubabad. The village is surrounded by three water tanks (cheruvulu) and the Sangem canal of Pakhal lake runs on the border of village which makes the fields green.

== Demographics ==
At the 2001 Indian census, Budharaopet had a population of 4,827 persons in 1,127 households. The population consisted of 2,423 males and 2,404 females.

The languages spoken are Telugu and Urdu and English.

== Economy ==
The major industry of the people is farming. Rice is the major crop grown there. There are also three rice mills.

== Government ==
The village is governed by a village panchayat present sarpanch " Kasa Praveen Kumar Yadav "

== Environment ==
In some areas of the village, the fluoride content in the water is more than usual.
