= Dharamsoth Redya Naik =

Indian politician

Dharamsoth Redya Naik (born 1954) is an Indian politician from Telangana state. He was a former minister and six time Member of the Legislative Assembly, four times from Andhra Pradesh and two times from Telangana from the Dornakal Assembly constituency, which is reserved for the Scheduled Tribe community, in Warangal district, representing the Indian National Congress in 1989, 1994, 1999, 2004 and 2014. He won on the Telangana Rashtra Samithi ticket in his last victory in the 2018 Telangana Legislative Assembly election.

== Early life ==
Naik is from Maripeda village, Dornakal, Warangal district, Telangana. He is the son of the late Dharamsoth Ramu Naik. He completed his B.A. at Arts and Science College, Hanamkonda, Warangal. He is a farmer and his wife runs her own business. He declared assets worth Rs.17 crore in his affidavit to the Election Commission of India. In 1981, he was elected as the sarpanch of Maripeda and served as a president of the Panchayat Samithi from 1981 to 1986.

== Career ==
Naik first became an MLA winning the Dornakal Assembly constituency in the 1989 Andhra Pradesh Legislative Assembly election representing the Indian National Congress (Indira). He polled 46,645 votes and defeated his nearest rival, Satyavathi Rathod of the Telugu Desam Party, by a margin of 5,085 votes. He retained the seat for the Congress winning the 1994 Andhra Pradesh Legislative Assembly election. He garnered 53,274 votes and beat his closest opponent, Nookala Naresh Reddy an independent candidate, by a margin of 26,079 votes. He won again for the third straight time winning the Dornakal seat in the 1999 Andhra Pradesh Legislative Assembly election where he polled 56,369 votes and defeated Naresh Reddy again, who contested this time on the Telugu Desam ticket, by a margin of 8,036 votes. He retained the seat for the Congress, winning for the fourth straight term in the 2004 Andhra Pradesh Legislative Assembly election. In 2004, he polled 72,669 and defeated his nearest rival, Banoth Jayanth Nath of the Telugu Desam Party, by a margin of 19,140 votes. He lost the 2009 Andhra Pradesh Legislative Assembly election to Satyavathi Rathod of the TDP by a margin of 4,623 votes.

After the bifurcation of Andhra Pradesh, he defeated Satyavathi Rathod, who contested this time on the TRS ticket in the 2014 Andhra Pradesh Legislative Assembly election which was concurrently held to elect both the Andhra Pradesh and Telangana legislators. He won again from Dornakal in the 2018 Telangana Legislative Assembly election, his last victory where he contested on a TRS ticket. In 2018, he polled 88,307 and defeated Jatoth Ram Chandru Naik of the Indian National Congress.
