= Bodrai Thanda =

Coordinates: 17°26′44.03″N 80°8′49.89″E

Bodrai Thanda is a Hamlet village in Perumandla sankeesa, Dornakal Mandal, Mahabubabad district in the Indian state of Telangana.
