= Gudur mandal =

Gudur mandal may refer to several mandals in India:

- Gudur mandal, Mahabubabad district
- Gudur mandal, Nellore district

== See also ==
- Guduru mandal, Krishna district
