= Kesamudram =

Kesamudram Kesari samudram
- Town
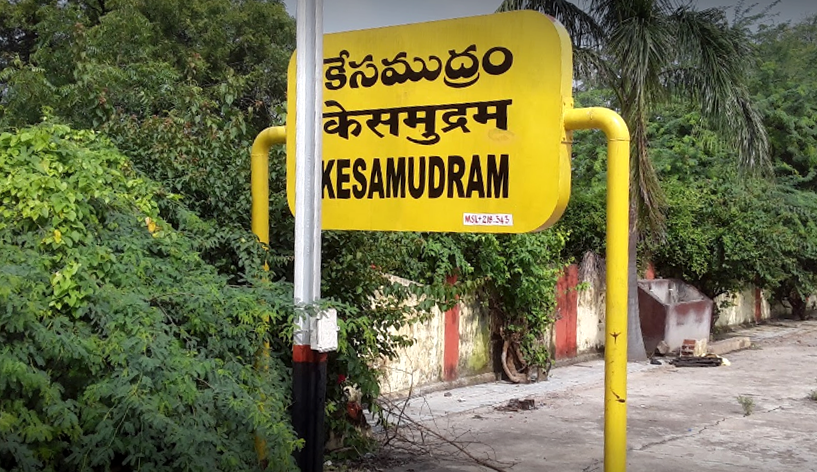
- Kesamudram Railway Station nameboard

- Location in Telangana, India Kesamudram (India)
- Coordinates: 17°41′15″N 79°53′40″E
- Country: India
- State: Telangana
- District: Mahabubabad
- Talukas: Kesamudram

Government
  - Type: Municipal Council
  - Body: Kesamudram Municipality

Population (2011)
  - Total: 12,904

Languages
  - Official: Telugu
- Time zone: UTC+5:30 (IST)
- PIN: 506112
- Telephone code: 08719
- Vehicle registration: TS 26
- Lok Sabha constituency: Mahabubabad Lok Sabha constituency
- Vidhan Sabha constituency: Mahabubabad Assembly constituency
- Website: telangana.gov.in

Kesamudram is a town and a municipality in Mahabubabad district of the Indian state of Telangana. In 2025, Gram panchayats of Kesamudram(village), Kesamudram (station) and other peripheral settlements were merged to form the municipality. Kesamudram is named after a grand lake constructed during the reign of Kakatiya dynasty. The town is also known for one of the largest markets in the region

== Villages in Kesamudram Mandal ==
The villages that fall under Kesamudram Mandal (Before formation of Inugurthy mandal) are:

1. Mahamoodpatnam (Thimmempet)
2. Kesamudram
3. Ameenapuram
4. Intikanne
5. Katrapally
6. Arpanapalle
7. Upparapalle
8. Korukondapally
9. Inugurthy (Mandal)
10. Komatipalle
11. Kalwala
12. Dhadnnasari
13. Penugonda
14. Beriwada
15. Rangapuram
16. Tallapoosapalle
17. Annaram
18. Narayanpur
19. Venkatagiri

== Etymology ==
Kesamudram has its name derived from Kesari Takam or Kesari Samudram, constructed by Prola I of the Kakatiy dynasty. According to Bayyaram Tank Inscription of Mailamba (Sister of Kakatiya Ganapatideva), Prola I had a title "AriGaja Kesari" and he constructed Kesari Takam or Kesari Samudram.

== Geography ==
Kesamudram is located 45 km from Warangal, and 18 kilometres from Mahabubabad district, Kesamudram's lalbahadur agriculture market committee is one of the biggest agriculture markets in Asia; turmeric, red mirchi, rice and pulses are exported worldwide from Kesamudram market. The renovated railway station was inaugurated on 28 April 2018 by MLA Shankar Naik, MP Sitaram Naik, ADR M Subramanyam, Sr Divisional commercial Manager Subith Sharma and railway staff. All major express trains halt in Kesamudram.

== Schools & colleges ==
- Z.P.S.S high school kesamudram station
- Z.P.S.S high school kesamudram village
- TS model school kalwala
- MGJBP girls school ameenapuram
- Samatha Modern High School 10+2 Upparpally Road
- Tribal welfare residential school kesamudram (girls)
- Geethanjali High School
- SVV High School
- Sri Viveka Vardini School, Village Kesamudram
- St Johns High School, Substation Thanda
- Gayatri krushividyaniketan
- Z.P.P.S.S KALVALA
- Z.P.P.S.S Upparapalle

Colleges

- Govt junior college kesamudram
- Govt polytechnic college kesamudram
- Govt degree college kesamudram
