= Gangaram (Mahabubabad District) =

- Mandal
- Location in Telangana, India Gangaram (India)
- Coordinates: 17°45′36″N 80°03′17″E
- Country: India
- State: Telangana
- District: Mahabubabad district
- Named for: Koyapatanam
- Talukas: Narsampet

Government
  - Type: Panchayat
  - Body: Gram Panchayat ZPTC = Eesam Rama INC MPTC = Vajja Sammakka CPI-ML Sarpanch = Bejjare.Ramu
- Elevation: 225 m (738 ft)

Population
  - Total: 12,000

Languages
  - Official: Telugu
- Time zone: UTC+5:30 (IST)
- PIN: 506135
- Telephone code: 08718/ +918712656967
- Vehicle registration: TG 26
- Website: telangana.gov.in

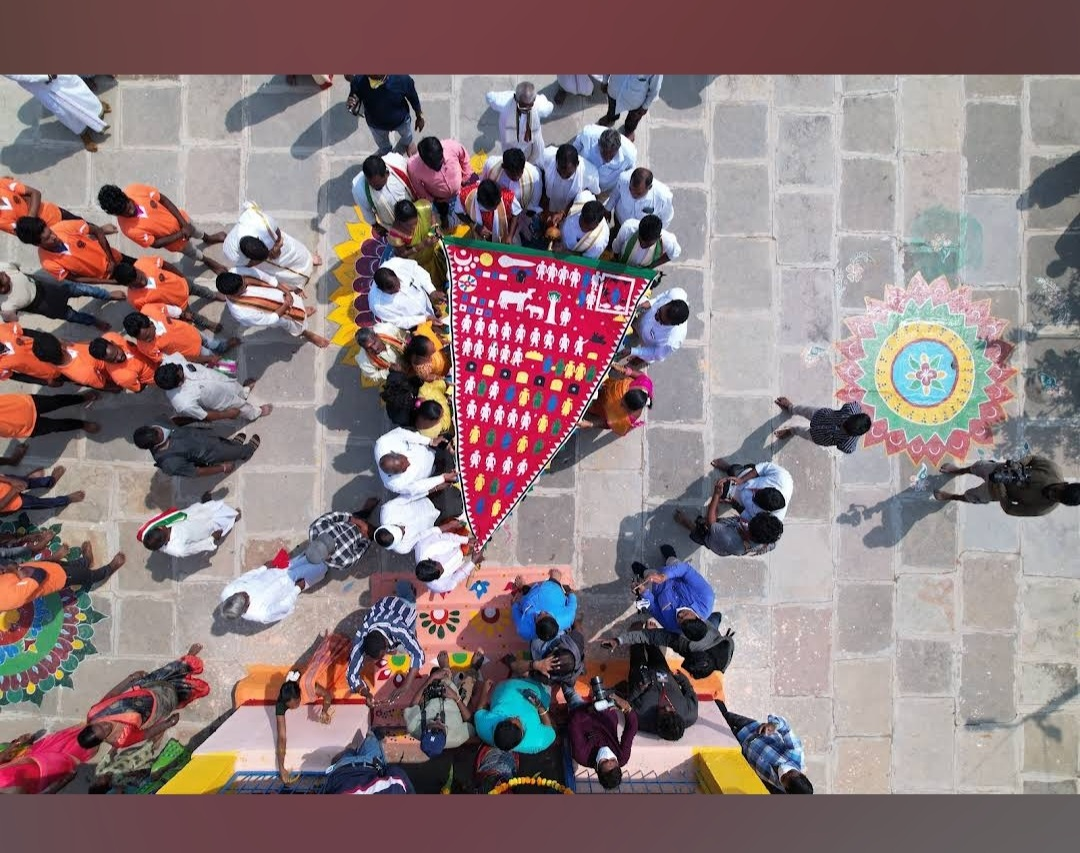

Gangaram is an agency mandal (fifth scheduled area) in Mulugu Constituency of Mahabubabad district of the Indian state of Telangana. Least populated mandal in Telangana state.

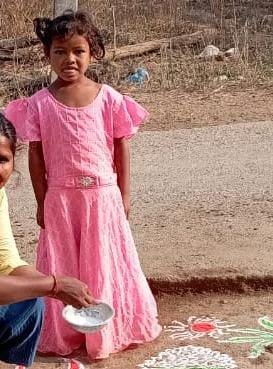

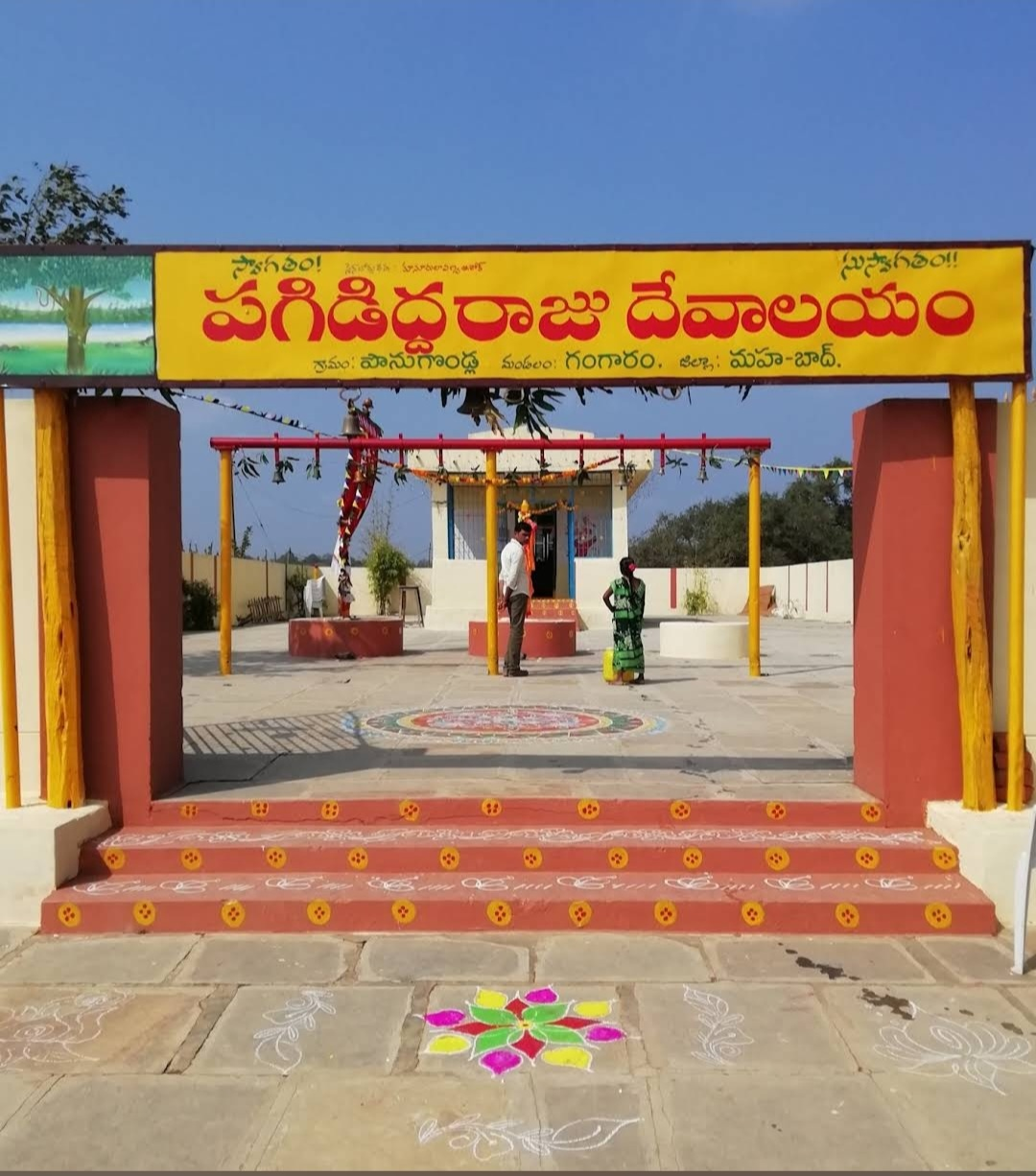

== Transport ==
- Narsampet to Ponugundla TGRTC Bus (3 times per day) vai Ashoknagar, kothaguda, Polaram, krishtapuram, Puttalabupathi, Tirmalagandi, Madagudem, Gangaram, Bhavurugonda, Katinagaram, Marrigudem, Andugulagudem, Mahadevagudem,..... Kamaram and Ponugundla
- Narsampet to Jangalapally Bus vai Ashoknagar, Kothaguda, Polaram, krishtapuram, Puttalabupathi, Tirmalagandi, Madagudem, Gangaram, katinagaram, Komatlagudem, chintaguda, Narsigudem, Thalla Gumpu, koya Gumpu and Jangalapally.
- Narsampet to Dubbagudem bus vai Ashoknagar, kothaguda, Polaram, puttalabupathi, Tirmalagandi, Gangaram, Bhavurugonda, Pedda yellapur, kamaram, Punugondla, Ramavaram, Lingala, Mamidigudem, Devalagudem, Dubbagudem. (People are made great efforts to extend bus service to Gundala but unfortunately Narsampet depot behavior recklessly)
- Narsampet to Yellandu via Ashoknagar, Kothaguda, Polaram, puttalabupathi, Gangaram, pandem, Yellandu.

== Agriculture ==
PODU LANDS:- Most cultivation is done using ponds and small streams in this area. Major crops are paddy, cotton, maize, grams and some seasonal crops. Due to the fertile lands the people grow 2 crops/year. Gangaram mandal was full of podu agriculture based lands which are acquired by deforestation and cutting down large forest by stakeholders with help of left wing terrorist CPI-ML New Democracy party, which land are belong to state was indiscriminately destroyed by non-adivasi also it affect the eco-culture and wildlife. The agriculture depends on small streams and bore wells in rabi season. Karif depends on monsoon rainfall. The major crops are Paddy, Maize, Cotton and mirchi.

Paddy:- The major and monsoon rainfall depends crop near to lakes, streams and bore wells. The rabi crops depends Lake water facilities. Maize:-This crop is major and in long ranging fields across forest areas. The people have land up to 25 acres of maize land in forest and near to forest areas. This crop depends on bore wells, rain and streams. But many people convert maize to Paddy fields. Issues in Agriculture:-Deforestation is the main issue to forest department officials, many irrationally and unethical converted forest lands to agriculture lands, So forest department trying it best to convert back by tenching illegal agriculture of forest lands. Rice and maize are dominated crops. Maize was main in podu lands near forest. Rice near villages. Electricity to farmland available. Rice procurement done by government.

== Politics ==
It is effected from radical left wing extremist [CPI-ML] party for decades. Rural base communism has strong hold . Cpi ml party main supported podu lands deforestation in 2009,2011 vast forest was disappeared. CPI-ML New Democracy party as dominant hold in these region before 2014, but after Telangana formation BRS party gained power in mandal has prominent figure Seethakka join congress party in 2017, the congress party gained much more power in these region. In 2018 and 2024 she had been MLA OF this region. ZPTC and MPTC are congress leaders. Seethakka being Koya adivasi, were majority voters are adivasies. You can't rule out BRS, it as strong cader base in very village of this mandal.

== Villages ==
- Ponugundla.(Sarpanch Erpa.Sudhakar BRS)
- Adavi Ramavaram.
- Dubbagudem.(Sarpanch Punem. Sudharani INC)
- Mamidigudem.
- Marrigudem.(Sarpanch Meda.swarupa INC)
- Mahadevanigudem.
- Jangalapally. (Banoth Tara)
- Chintaguda.( Sarpanch Erpa. Swarupa BRS)
- Katinagaram.
- Komatlagudem.( Sarpanch Gunta.Ramarao INC)
- Puttalabupathy.
- Tirmalagandi.(Sarpanch Thati.Krishana Rao)
- Krishnagar.
- Bhavurugonda.(Sarpanch Mudiga.Verabhadram congress)
- Madagudem. (Eesam Suresh)
- Kodishalamitta. (Bachala. Laxmanrao)
- Pandem.
- Andugulagudem.
- Thalla Gumpu.
- Kamaram.(Sarpanch Eeka.Parvatamma INC)
- Dora vari vempally.
- Gangaram (Sarpanch Bejjare.Ramu)

== Economy ==
Indian bank in Gangaram mandal. Agriculture mainly practice rice, Maize. Forest Abnus/Beedi leaves cut provide summer revenue to local adivasi. There is no major irrigation projects, majority population depends on agriculture cultivation and forest products. Roads are inappropriate and they go Narsampet and Yellandu for education, domestic and agriculture products. Many adivasi people are in debt cycle, in hands of fertilizer shopkeepers and losing there farmlands to repay debt. Gangaram as Petroleum station and few shop.

== Tourism ==
Edubavula( seven wells ) major tourist attraction from widerange distance, forest department abeyance transit and visit due to back to back death of large people.

== Demographics ==
It is a Tribal inhabited mandal as schedule tribe agency mandal. Indigenous people koya's with distinct culture, food habits.

Demographics of Gangaram mandal (2011)
1. Koya (tribe) (94.0%)
2. Lambadi (3.25%)
3. others (2.75%)

== Tragedies ==
- On May 4, 2025, in Pegadapally village, an Army officer, Maddela Prakash (age 30) of Andugulagudem village, died in a road accident after his vehicle collided with a tree on a curved road near a nursery plantation. He was rushed to a hospital in Warangal but succumbed to severe injuries. He is survived by his wife. Prakash was recruited into the Indian Army in 2014.
- On August 16, 2023, Eesala Rakesh (age 25) died due to electrocution in a paddy field at Kodishalamitta. He was attempting to turn off an electric motor when he was accidentally exposed to an electrical circuit. He is survived by his wife and child.
- Kalthi Govind (age 50), a resident of Karlai village, died following a fatal attack by a wild Indian bison in a forested area near bushes. Reports indicate he may have approached a bison calf, which likely provoked the animal's defensive attack in a remote forest area.
