= Murali Naik Bhukya =

Indian politician

Member of the Telangana Legislative Assembly
- Incumbent
- Assumed office December 2023
- Preceded by: Banoth Shankar Nayak

Murali Naik Bhukya (born 1966) is an Indian politician from Telangana state. He is a member of the Telangana Legislative Assembly from Mahabubabad Assembly constituency, which is reserved for ST community, in Mahabubabad district. He represents the Indian National Congress Party and was elected in the 2023 Telangana Legislative Assembly election.

== Early life and education ==
Naik is from Mahabubabad. He was born to Mangya Naik Bhukya in 1966. He is a medical doctor. He also married a doctor. He did his M.B.B.S. at Osmania Medical College in 1994. Later, he completed his Master of Surgery from Pondicherry University, JIPMER in 2004.

== Career ==
Naik was elected in the Mahabubabad Assembly constituency representing the Indian National Congress in the 2023 Telangana Legislative Assembly election. He polled 116,644 votes, and defeated his nearest rival and two time MLA, Banoth Shankar Naik of the Bharat Rashtra Samithi by a margin of 50,171 votes.
