= Satyavathi Rathod =

Indian politician

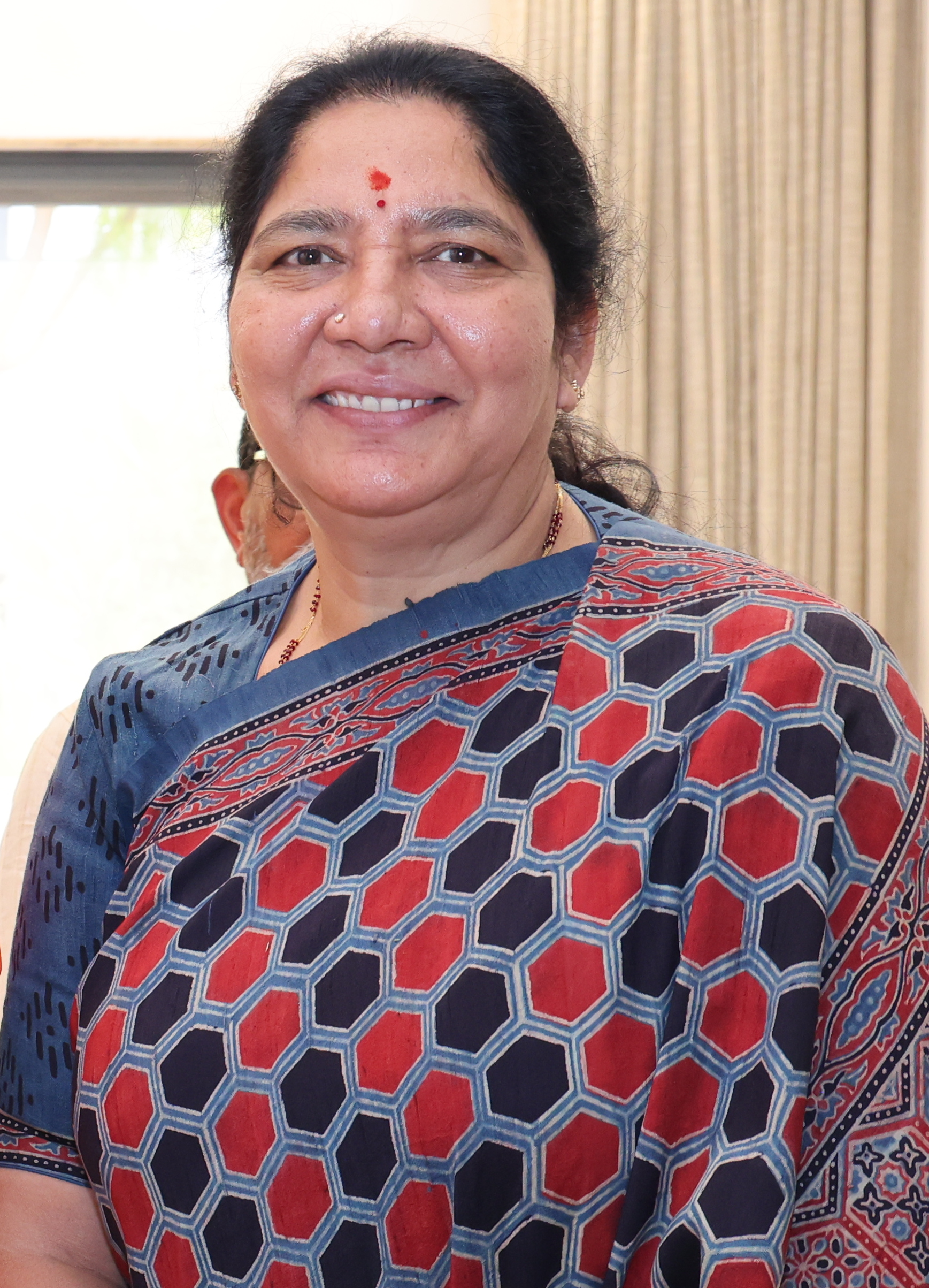
- Rathod in 2026

Minister of Scheduled Tribals, Women and Child Welfare of Telangana
- In office 8 September 2019 – 6 December 2023
- Preceded by: Azmeera Chandulal
- Succeeded by: Seethakka
- Chief Minister: K. Chandrasekhar Rao

Member of Telangana Legislative Council
- Incumbent
- Assumed office 12 March 2019
- Constituency: MLAs

Member of Andhra Pradesh Legislative Assembly
- In office 2009–2014
- Constituency: Dornakal (ST)

Personal details
- Born: 31 October 1969 (age 56) Gundrathimadugu
- Party: Bharat Rashtra Samithi
- Other political affiliations: Telugu Desam Party (1989–2014)
- Spouse: Govind Rathod (died 2009)
- Children: 2

Satyavathi Rathod (born 31 October 1969) is an Indian politician who served as the Minister for Tribal Welfare, Women and Child Welfare of Telangana from 2019 to 2023. She is the first tribal woman to serve as a Minister in Telangana. She is as a member of the Telangana Legislative Council from the Telangana Rashtra Samithi. Rathod previously represented the Dornakal constituency in the Andhra Pradesh Legislative Assembly in 2009 from the Telugu Desam Party. She was appointed as BRS Party Whip in Telangana Legislative Council

== Early and personal life ==
Satyavathi Rathod was born on 31 October 1969 in Pedda Thanda hamlet in Kuravi mandal of present-day Mahabubabad district, Telangana (at the time part of Andhra Pradesh). The youngest among five siblings, her parents are Lingya Naik and Dasmi Bhai.

After Class VIII, Rathod dropped out of school and was married to Govind Rathod. He died in a road accident in July 2009. She has two sons.

Rathod later obtained her degree from an open university.

== Career ==
Rathod began her political career in 1989. She joined the Telugu Desam Party and contested from the Dornakal constituency the same year but lost to Indian National Congress candidate Redya Naik. In 1995, she was elected as the Sarpanch of Gundratimadugu. Later in 2006, she won the Zila Parishad of Narsimhulapet.

In the 2009 Andhra Pradesh Legislative Assembly election, Rathod was elected as an MLA from the Dornakal constituency. In March 2014, she quit the Telugu Desam Party and joined the Bharat Rashtra Samithi. She re-contested from the same seat in 2014, losing again to Redya Naik of Congress. She did not contest in the 2018 assembly election.

In March 2019, she was elected as a member of the Telangana Legislative Council. In September 2019, Rathod took oath as Minister of ST Welfare, Women and Child Welfare in the Second cabinet of K. Chandrashekar Rao. She became the first woman from a scheduled tribe to serve as a minister in Telangana.

She was appointed as BRS Party Whip in Telangana Legislative Council on 4 February 2025.
