= Haripirala =

- Village
- Country: India
- State: Telangana
- District: Mahabubabad district
- Talukas: Thorrur

Population (2001)
  - Total: 3,500

Languages
  - Official: Telugu
- Time zone: UTC+5:30 (IST)
- PIN: 506163
- Telephone code: 08719

Haripirala is a village in Warangal district, Telangana state, India. Haripirala is a mid-sized village; the village is 8 km (5 mi) away from the highway connecting Andhra and Nagpur (Maharashtra state) with close proximity to two major Telangana cities, Warangal and Khammam. It is an education hub for surrounding several small villages with Zilla Parshath High school. It is surrounded by lakes and mountains . Although the source of transportation is public sometimes people seek private transportation

Languages spoken: Telugu (Telangana Yasa, a mixture of Urdu and Telugu), Lambade, Hindi.
