= Banoth Shankar Nayak =

Indian politician

Banoth Shankar Naik

Member of the Telangana Legislative Assembly
- In office 2014–2018
- Preceded by: Maloth Kavitha (constituency part of Andhra Pradesh until 2014)
- Succeeded by: himself
- Constituency: Mahabubabad
- In office 12 December 2018 – 2023
- Preceded by: himself
- Succeeded by: Murali Naik Bhukya
- Constituency: Mahabubabad

Personal details
- Born: 20 May 1965 (age 61)
- Party: Bharat Rashtra Samithi
- Education: Bachelor of Technology; Master of Business Administration
- Alma mater: REC Engineering College, Warangal (1985–1990); Kakatiya University
- Other Positions: 2019 – 2023: Member of Committee on Welfare of Schedule Tribes of Telangana

Banoth Shankar Nayak (also spelled as Banoth Shankar Naik) is an Indian politician, who served as the Member of the Telangana Legislative Assembly. He won the 2014 and 2018 Telangana elections for the Mahabubabad Assembly constituency. He was stood again as a candidate for the Mahbubababd constituency in the 2023 Telangana election. He lost against the Congress candidate Dr. Murali Naik Bhukya.

== Political career ==
Election Year	Party	Votes	Vote %	Result
2014	TRS	78,370	45.20%	Won
2018	TRS (now BRS)	85,397	47.00%	Won
2023	BRS	66,473	31.60%	Lost
