= Sitaram Naik =

Indian politician and academic

MP
- In office 2014–2019
- Preceded by: Balram Naik
- Succeeded by: Kavitha Maloth
- Constituency: Mahabubabad

Personal details
- Born: Malliah Pally, Warangal, Telangana, India
- Party: Bharatiya Janata Party
- Other political affiliations: Bharat Rashtra Samithi
- Children: 3

A. Sitaram Naik is an Indian politician and academic. He was elected to the 16th Lok Sabha in 2014 General Elections. He represents Mahbubabad Lok Sabha constituency.

== Career ==
He is an academic working at Kakatiya University, Warangal. He was an active Telangana activist. He won from Mahbubabad Lok Sabha constituency defeating Union minister P Balram Naik.

Sitaram Naik was upset with the BRS leadership after it denied him ticket from Mahabubabad in 2018 and 2024 and once again fielded sitting MP Maloth Kavitha.

Sitaram Naik resigned to BRS party and joined the Bharatiya Janata Party on 10 March 2024 in the presence of party's General Secretary and Telangana state incharge Tarun Chugh at central party headquarters in New Delhi ahead of 2024 Lok Sabha elections.
