= Jatoth Ram Chander Naik =

Indian politician

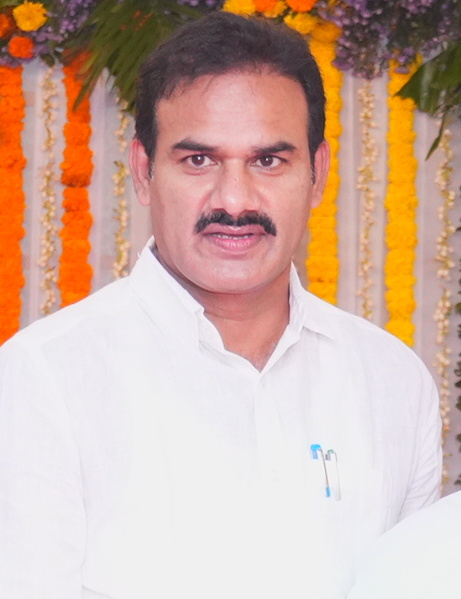

3rd Deputy Speaker of the Telangana Legislative Assembly
- Incumbent
- Assumed office 8 June 2025
- Chief Minister: Revanth Reddy
- Speaker: Gaddam Prasad Kumar
- Preceded by: T. Padma Rao Goud

Member of Telangana Legislative Assembly
- Incumbent
- Assumed office 2023
- Preceded by: Dharamsoth Redya Naik
- Constituency: Dornakal

Personal details
- Born: 6 May 1974 Bommakal, Peddavangara mandal, Mahabubabad district, Telangana
- Party: Indian National Congress
- Spouse: Dr Prameela
- Children: Shiva Tarun, Shiva Saketh

Jatoth Ram Chander Naik (born 1975) is an Indian politician from Telangana state. He is currently & 3rd deputy speaker. He is an MLA from Dornakal which is reserved for ST community Mahabubabad district. He represents Indian National Congress Party and won the 2023 Telangana Legislative Assembly election.

== Early life and education ==
Naik is from Dornakal in Mahabubabad district. He is a medical doctor. He completed his M.B.B.S. in 1998 and later did his M.S. (General) at Osmania Medical College in 2001. His wife is also a doctor.

== Career ==
Naik won from Dornakal Assembly constituency representing Indian National Congress in the 2023 Telangana Legislative Assembly election. He polled 115, 587 votes, and defeated his nearest rival Dharamsoth Redya Naik of Bharath Rashtra Samithi by a margin of 53,131 votes.

He was appointed as Deputy Speaker of the Telangana Legislative Assembly on 8 June 2025.
