= Pakhal Wildlife Sanctuary =

Wildlife sanctuary in India

- Pākhal van'yaprāṇula abhayāraṇyaṁ
- IUCN category IV (habitat/species management area)
- Location within Telangana Location within India
- Interactive map of Pakhal Wildlife Sanctuary
- Location: Pakhal Lake, Telangana, India
- Coordinates: 17°55′N 80°06′E
- Area: 860.00 km^{2} (332.05 sq mi)
- Established: 1952
- Website: https://www.telanganatourism.gov.in/partials/destinations/wildlife/mahabubabad/pakhal-wildlife-sanctuary.html

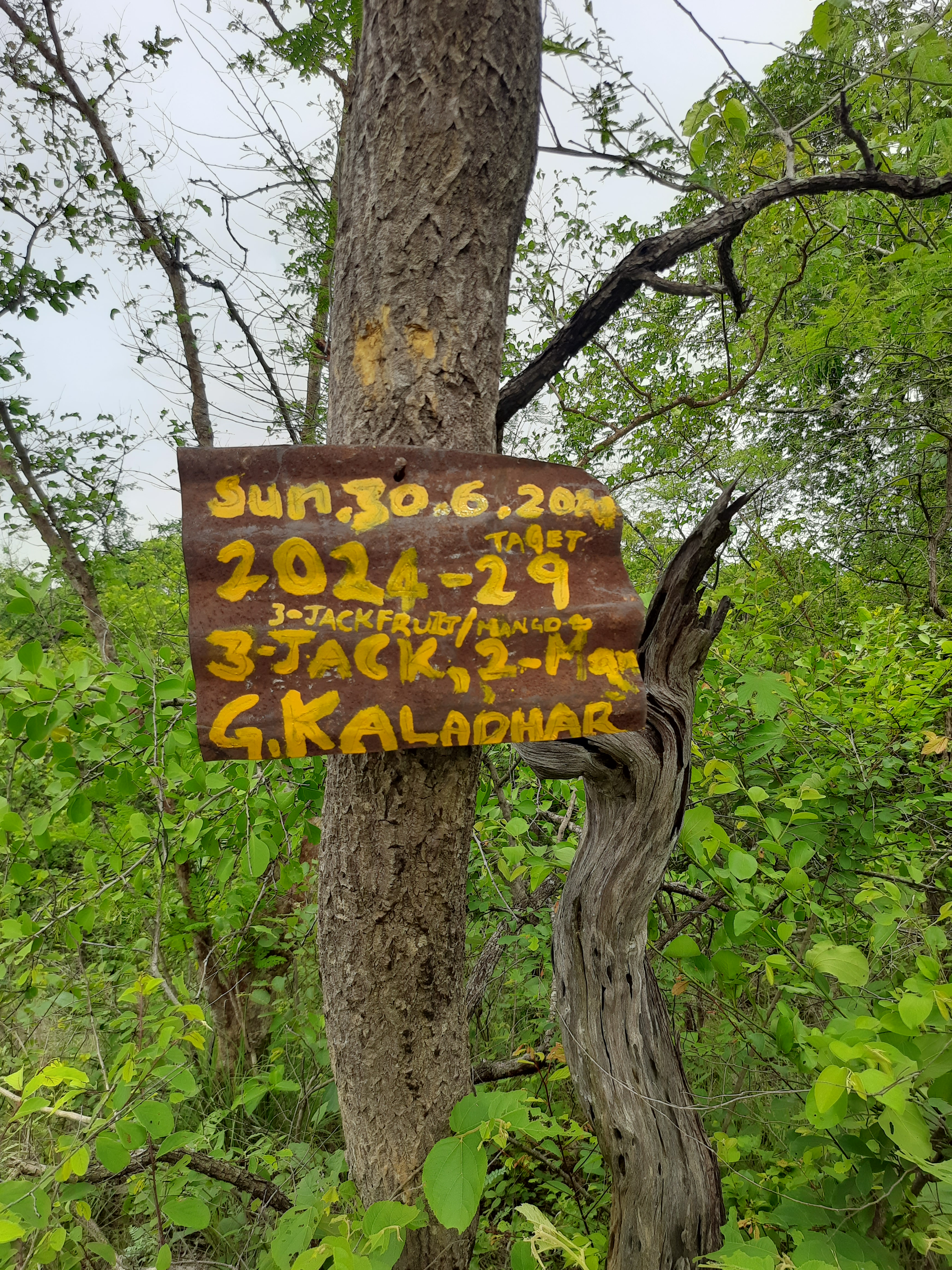
Board of planted species of 3 Jackfruit and 2 Mango plants in 2024.

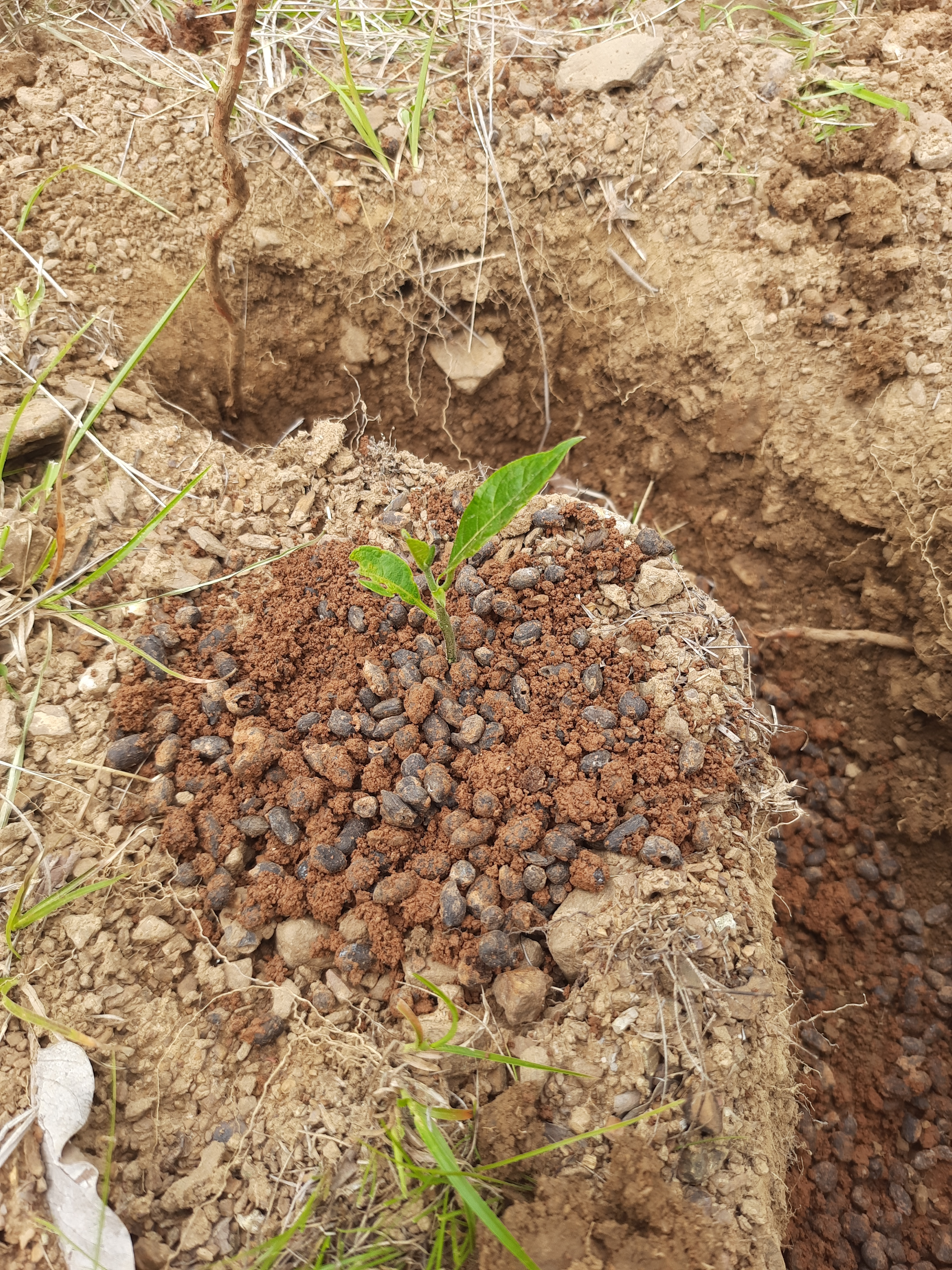
Jackfruit planted in Forest on 2024.

The Pakhal Wildlife Sanctuary is situated adjacent to the Pakhal Lake, in Telangana state in India, it is an artificial lake. Encompassing a vast expanse of 839 square kilometres, the sanctuary spans across the area, and is home to a variety of wildlife, including tigers, leopards, sloth bears, chital, nilgai, and four-horned antelope.

== History ==
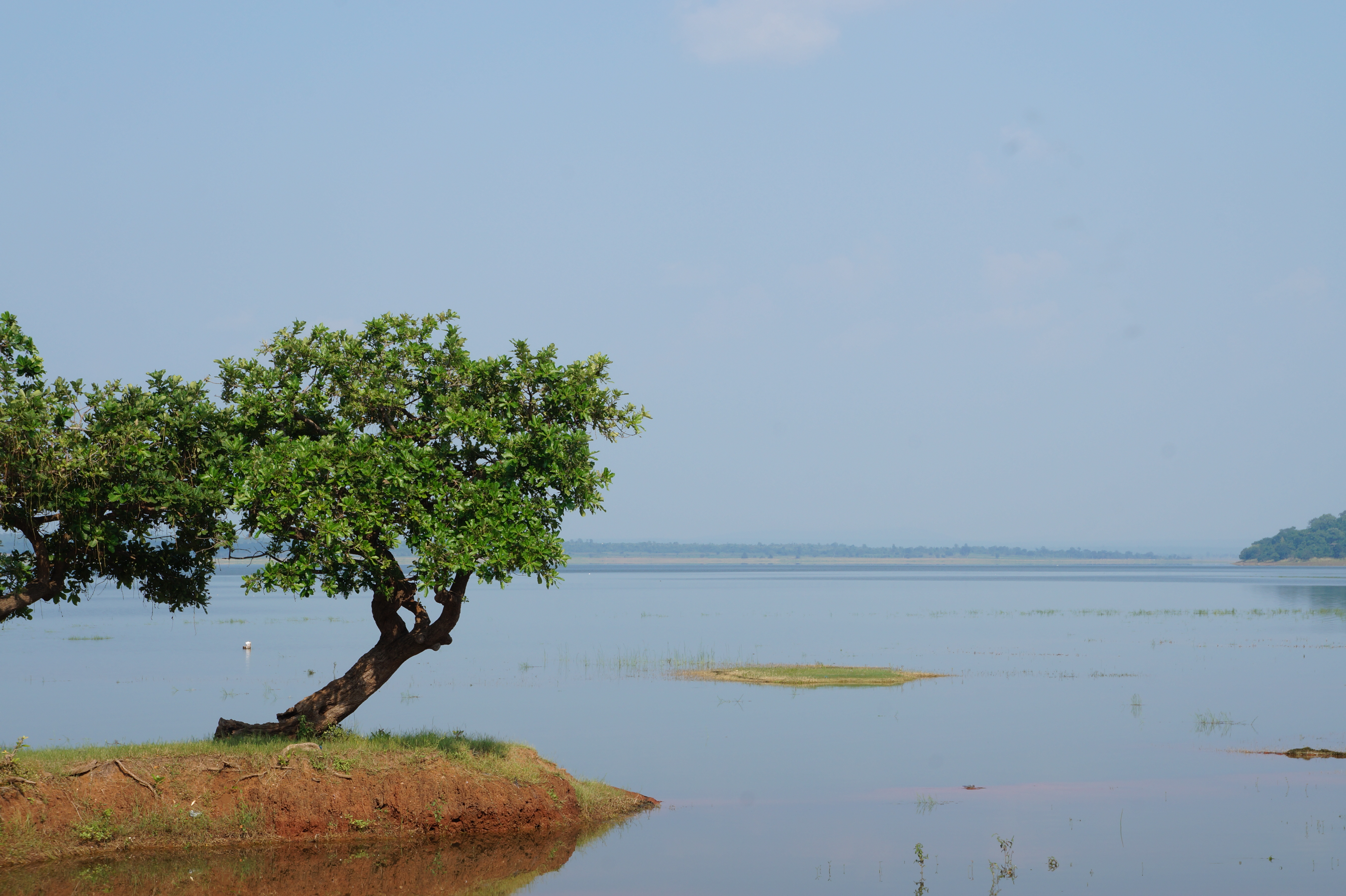
Pakhal lake

It was established in the year 1952 and is located around 50 km away from the town of Warangal, in the state of Telangana.Pakhal Wildlife Sanctuary is named after the person who excavated the lake, Ganapati Deva, the Kakatiyan ruler. The lake was constructed in the first decade of the 13th century (1213 AD).
