= Danthalapally mandal =

Coordinates: 17°30′35″N 80°09′34″E

Danthalapally
- Mandal
- Interactive map of Danthalapally
- Country: India
- State: Telangana
- District: Mahabubabad

Languages
  - Official: Telugu
- Time zone: UTC+5:30 (IST)
- PIN: 506324
- Telephone code: 08719
- Nearest city: Mahububabad
- Climate: hot (Köppen)

Danthalapally is a Mandal in Mahabubabad district, Telangana. There is a Pedda Mupparam stream which sometimes overflows causing traffic disruptions.
