= Bayyaram Mines =

- Location: Telangana, India
- Products: Iron Ore
- Opened: 2001; 25 years ago

Bayyaram Mines are iron ore mine located in Bayyaram in Mahabubabad district, Telangana, India. The mines also include Gudur Mandal in Warangal district.

== The mines ==
The iron ore mines are spread over 5,342 hectares in Bayyaram, Garla and Nelakondapally mandals in Mahabubabad, Khammam and Gudur mandal in Warangal. The Indian Bureau of Mines had estimated the value of ore at Rs. 16 lakh crore.

== History ==
In 2001, the AP Government under CM, N Chandrababu Naidu, gave rights to three tribals to mine in 63 acres. Later, the mines spread over Bayyaram, Garla and Nelakondapalli areas of Khammam district and Guduru in Warangal district, were first allocated by the then Chief Minister of Andhra Pradesh, Y. S. Rajasekhara Reddy in June 2010 to a joint venture of AP Minerals Development Corporation Ltd (APMDCL) and Rakshana Consortium, a private company. It was cancelled by Chief Minister, Kiran Kumar Reddy in June, 2012 and allotted it to VSP in April 2013.

== VSP allocation controversy ==
A new agitation arose after the iron ore was allocated to public sector company, Vizag Steel Plant (VSP). Pro-Telangana parties and Congress leaders from the region took exception to the Chief Minister allocating resources of one region to a manufacturing facility located in another region. Decades ago there was a slogan in Andhra region, Visakha Ukku, Andhrula Hakku (Vizag iron, the right of Andhra people), now activists of Telangana interplay it as Bayyaram Ukku, Telangana Hakku (Bayyaram iron, the right of Telangana people).
