= Garla =

- Mandal
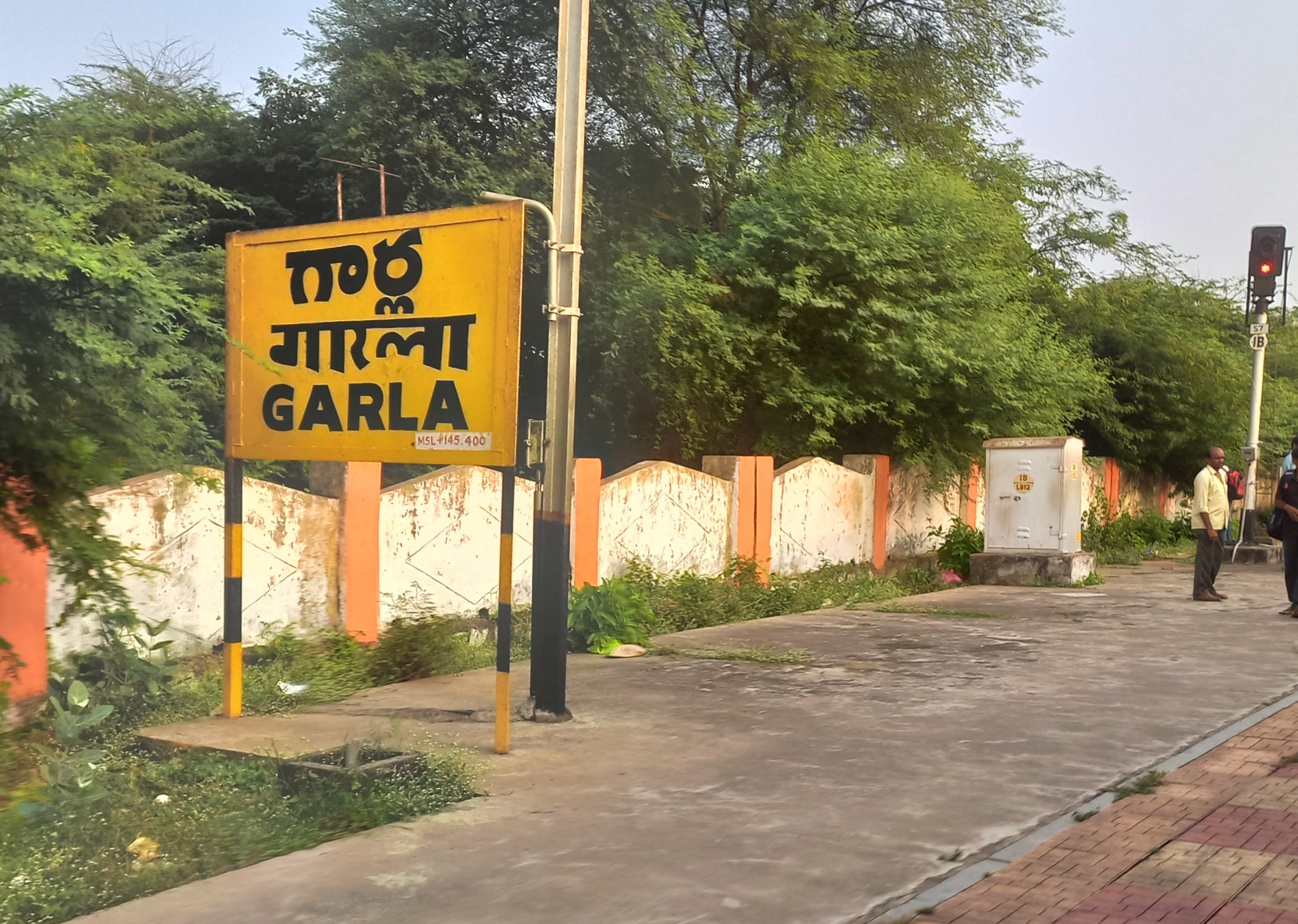
- Garla railway station name board

- Location in Telangana, India Garla (India)
- Coordinates: 17.488458°N 80.142831°E
- Country: India
- State: Telangana
- District: Mahabubabad (New)

Languages
  - Official: Telugu
- Time zone: UTC+5:30 (IST)
- PIN: 507210
- Telephone code: 08745
- Nearest city: Khammam
- Vidhan Sabha constituency: Yellandu
- Climate: hot (Köppen)

Garla is a mandal in Mahabubabad district, Telangana. It is on the bank of river the Munneru, which is one of the tributaries of the River Krishna. Garla is a gram Panchayat is a Rural Local Body in Garla Panchayat Samiti part of Mahabubabad Zila Parishad Gram Panchayat Garla is further divided into 14 Wards. Gram Panchayat Garla has total 14 elected members by people.

== Weather ==
Garla has a semi-tropical climate, where the people and its surroundings are pleasant and enjoyable. During summers, the temperatures soar to more than 48 °C. In winters, temperatures range between 12 °C and 27 °C, which is pleasant. Garla receives the North-East and the South-West monsoon, from June to September, and from October to November respectively. Mainly relies on the monsoons and rainfall.

== Demographics ==
The Garla village has population of 13576 of which 6377 are males while 7199 are females as per Population Census 2011.In Garla village population of children with age 0-6 is 1268 which makes up 9.34% of total population of village. Average Sex Ratio of Garla village is 1129 which is higher than Andhra Pradesh state average of 993. Child Sex Ratio for the Garla as per census is 870, lower than Andhra Pradesh average of 939

Garla village has higher literacy rate compared to Andhra Pradesh. In 2011, literacy rate of Garla village was 67.77% compared to 67.02% of Andhra Pradesh. In Garla Male literacy stands at 74.96% while female literacy rate was 61.57%.

As per constitution of India and Panchyati Raaj Act, Garla village is administrated by Sarpanch (Head of Village) who is elected representative of village.

=== Caste Factor ===
In Garla village, most of the village population is from Schedule Tribe (ST). Schedule Tribe (ST) constitutes 43.84% while Schedule Caste (SC) were 10.08% of total population in Garla village.

=== Work Profile ===
In Garla village out of total population, 6133 were engaged in work activities. 82.42% of workers describe their work as Main Work (Employment or Earning more than 6 Months) while 17.58% were involved in Marginal activity providing livelihood for less than 6 months. Of 6133 workers engaged in Main Work, 950 were cultivators (owner or co-owner) while 2631 were Agricultural labourer.

=== Religion-wise Population - Garla Mandal ===
Religion	Total		Male	Female
Hindu	35,260	(95.3%)	17,303	17,957
Muslim	1,237	(3.34%)	616	621
Christian	204	(0.55%)	117	87
Sikh	1	(0%)	0	1
Buddhist	1	(0%)	0	1
Jain	108	(0.29%)	60	48
Other Religion	1	(0%)	1	0
No Religion Specified	186	(0.5%)	25	161
