= Kothaguda =

- Mandal
- Location in Telangana, India Kothaguda (India)
- Coordinates: 17°54′48″N 80°03′17″E
- Country: India
- State: Telangana
- District: Mahabubabad district
- Talukas: Narsampet
- Elevation: 225 m (738 ft)

Languages
  - Official: Telugu
- Time zone: UTC+5:30 (IST)
- PIN: 506135
- Telephone code: 08718
- Vehicle registration: TG 26
- Website: telangana.gov.in

Kothaguda is an agency mandal(5th scheduled area) in Mulugu Constituency of Mahabubabad district of the Indian state of Telangana.

== Administration ==
The village under this mandal are Kothapally, Mylaram, Gunjedu, Burgu Gumpu, Polaram, krishtapuram, and Rautupally.

== Agriculture ==
Most cultivation is done using Kothaguda Lake and Pakhal Lake in this area. Major crops are paddy, cotton, maize, grams and some seasonal crops. Due to the fertile lands the people grow 2 crops/year.

== Demographics ==
Demographics of Kothaguda mandal (2011)
1. Koya (tribe) (56.1%)
2. Other Backward classes (31.2%)
3. others (12.7%)

OBC'S came to agency area in search of opportunities, agriculture and pastoral lands from plain lands.

== Geography ==
Nearby village Gunjedu is 3 km towards Mahaboobad. It is a new attraction of Gunjedu Musalamma Jatara like Medaram famous for Tribes and surrounding people, due to its serene nature of the village and surrounded by pond and its decent infrastructure and its people who are now famous for their good education.

A lake was built in 1213 by Kakatiya king, Ganapathideva, by harnessing a small tributary of the Krishna River. It is located 50 km from Warangal and spreads over 30 km.

In 2009 the town experienced a decrease in purchasing power as a local drought ravaged the harvests.

== Tragedies Stories ==
- Pulsam Ravali(21) of Jangavanigudem (Rampur D) village, had died from electric shock of table fan shock circuit accidentally she contact fan.
- Jinukala Raju(25) of Edullapally village he died due to electric shock, when he went into a crop field to turn off a motor, but, due to heavy rain the motor was wet and he was thrown into a nearby stream and found dead.
- Banda Vikram(16 age) of Rangappagudem village had died from suicidal hanging with long strip of cloth, due immense depression and stress from love failure he had ended his life.
- etukla Rithikh (10 age) and Jathin(10 age) died of drowning in nearby well during open defecation, event occurred in enchaguda village.
- Bangari. Pentaiah (45 age) Karnegandi village had been demise in unfortunate accident between tractor and truck.

== Achievements ==
- Kusa.Ravi Kumar from edullapally village recruited into Mandal Parishad Development Officer prestigious Group-1 conducted by Telangana Public Service Commission on occasion of Dussehra 2025.
- Bhukya. Bhiksham selected into Group 2 from Polaram village.
