= Chinnagudur mandal =

Coordinates: 17°30′35″N 80°09′34″E

Chinnagudur
- Mandal
- Interactive map of Chinnagudur
- Country: India
- State: Telangana
- District: Mahabubabad

Languages
  - Official: Telugu
- Time zone: UTC+5:30 (IST)
- PIN: 506104
- Telephone code: 08719
- Nearest city: Mahububabad
- Vidhan Sabha constituency: Dornakal
- Climate: hot (Köppen)

Chinnagudur is a Mandal in Mahabubabad district, Telangana.
