= Balram Naik =

Indian politician

Porika Balram Naik
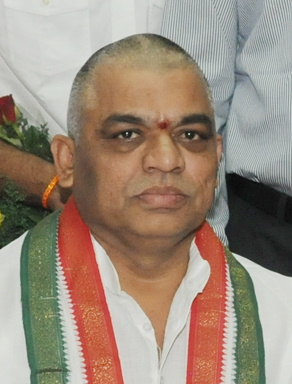
- Naik in 2012

Member of Parliament, Lok Sabha
- Incumbent
- Assumed office 4 June 2024
- Preceded by: Kavitha Maloth
- Constituency: Mahabubabad
- In office 16 May 2009 – 16 May 2014
- Preceded by: Constituency created
- Succeeded by: Sitaram Naik
- Constituency: Mahabubabad

Minister of State for Social Justice and Empowerment
- In office 28 October 2012 – 26 May 2014 Serving with D. Napoleon until March 2013 and Manikrao Hodlya Gavit from June 2013
- Prime Minister: Manmohan Singh
- Minister: Selja Kumari; Mallikarjun Kharge

Personal details
- Born: 6 June 1964 (age 62) Mahabubabad, Andhra Pradesh
- Party: Indian National Congress
- Spouse(s): Tirupatamma; Married 17 July 1986
- Children: 2 Sons
- Parent(s): Lacchu Naik; Lakshmi Bai
- Education: B.A from Andhra University, Hyderabad
- Profession: Social Worker, Politician
- Official Biography: Web link

Porika Balram Naik known as Balram Naik (born 6 June 1964) is an Indian politician from the state of Telangana belonging to the Indian National Congress party He was a member of the 15th Lok Sabha, Lower House of the Parliament of India. and a member of the 15th and 18th Lok Sabha representing the Mahabubabad constituency. He also served as a Minister of State in the Ministry of Social Justice and Empowerment under prime minister Manmohan Singh from 28 October 2012 until 26 May 2014.

== Early life ==
Balram was born in Madanapalli, Warangal in a rural Banjara family to Laxman Naik and Lakshmi. He holds the Bachelor of Arts degree from Andhra University.

== Career ==
Balram Naik was a police constable and then was into real estate business prior to entering politics in 2009.

He was elected to 15th Lok Sabha in 2009 from the Mahabubabad parliamentary constituency of Andhra Pradesh state. He was a member, Committee on Labour. He was inducted into the council of ministers on 28 October 2012 and was appointed as Minister of State for Social Justice and Empowerment and held the position until 26 May 2014.

He recontested from the Mahabubabad constituency in 2014 and 2019 general elections but was unsuccessful and in both occasions, was defeated by the Telangana Rashtra Samithi candidates. In 2024 general election, he defeated sitting MP Kavitha Maloth from the same constituency with a margin of 3,49,165 votes and was re-elected to the Lok Sabha for the second time.

=== Social and cultural activities ===
Balram is involved in social work for upliftment and welfare of tribal persons in the State of Andhra Pradesh and running Old age homes to provide shelter to elderly persons and sick persons.

== Personal life ==
Balram Naik is married to Tirupatamma and has two sons.
