= Nellikudur =

- Village
- Location in Telangana, India Nellikudur (India)
- Coordinates: 17.5811°N 79.75°E
- Country: India
- State: Telangana
- District: Mahabubabad district

Languages
  - Official: Telugu
- Time zone: UTC+5:30 (IST)
- PIN: 506368
- Telephone code: 08719
- Vehicle registration: TS
- Website: telangana.gov.in

Nellikudur is a village in Mahabubabad district of the Indian state of Telangana. It is the mandal headquarters of Nellikudur mandal. It is administered under Thorrur revenue division.

It is between the towns of Thorrur and Mahbubabad in Mahabubabad district, 14 kilometers from Thorrur and 27 kilometers from Mahbubabad.
