= Thorrur, Mahabubabad district =

Thorrur
- Revenue Division/city
- Location in Telangana, India Thorrur (India)
- Coordinates: 17.5857°N 79.6578°E
- Country: India
- State: Telangana
- District: Mahabubabad
- Talukas: Mahabubabad
- Elevation: 302 m (991 ft)

Population
  - Total: 26,900

Languages
  - Official: Telugu
- Time zone: UTC+5:30 (IST)
- PIN: 506163
- Telephone code: 08719
- Vehicle registration: TG-26
- Website: www.thorrur.com

Thorrur is a revenue division, mandal and a municipality in Mahabubabad district of Telangana, India. It is located on Jayaprakash Narayana road between Warangal and Khammam. It is at about 50 km from Warangal, 62 km from Suryapet and 70 km from Khammam. It is a rapidly growing town due to its location.

== Geography ==
The region of the mandal is mainly plain with occasional hillocks. For a satellite and map view of Thorrur please click the following Google Maps link.

== Demographics ==
Thorrur is a revenue division and mandal. Thorrur mandal, including its villages, has a total population of 76,519 of which 38,506 are male and 38,013 are female, according to 2011 census. Male female ratio is 987:1000. Of the total population, 12,179 are Scheduled Tribes and 14,468 are Scheduled Castes. The overall literacy percentage is around 55% of which male is 67% and female is 43%. Thorrur town has a population of 19,100 with 9,688 males and 9,412 females. The main language spoken is Telugu with quite a bit of Telangana accent. Majority of the population are Hindu with few Muslims and Christians. In addition, there are many tribals called lambada, mostly living in small hamlets (thandas).

== History ==
Origins of the name Thorrur are not known. There is a fort (Ghadi), in Thorrur town, in the old village area, indicating local rulers (Jamindars) under Nizam or even earlier rulers. History of Thorrur is similar to that of Warangal ruled by Kakatiya's, Delhi sultanate, Mughals and finally Nizams. The region prospered during Kakatiya's period with the construction of tanks for villages, temples etc.

== Administration and politics ==
Thorrur is in Palakurthi assembly constituency and Warangal parliamentary constituency. Though the assembly constituency is not named after Thorrur, it acts as the center for all political activities. Thorrur being the biggest town in the constituency, the main offices of all the political parties are located here. Indian National Congress and Bharat Rashtra Samithi (TRS) are the major political parties.

== Education ==
Thorrur is known for Education hub Thorrur ZPPSS is one of the best govt high schools in district.

Kindergarten Schools : 1. Baby Buds Play School

Schools : 1.Sharada High School (E/M & T/M). 2.Abhyas Montessori Techno School (E/M). 3.Vikas High school (E/M). 4.Siddarha High School (E/M, T/M). 5.Sahithi High School (E/M, T/M). 6.Little Flower High School (E/M). 7.St'Savio, Vikas E/M School. 8.Krishnaveni talent High School. 9.St.paul's high school.10.PSR school of excellence. 10.Vidya bharathi High school 11.Aryabhatta concept school. 12.Ratna High School.13.ARYABHATTA HS NELL

Junior Colleges

1. Govt. Jr. College. 2.Vidyabhivardhini Jr. college. 3.Vaggdevi Jr. College. 4.Samatha Jr. College. 5.Ekashila Jr. College. 6.Sairam Jr. College. 7.Samatha ITI.

Degree Colleges 1.Sairam Degree College (SRDC). 2.Samatha Degree & PG College. 3.Kakatiya Degree College. 4.Maharshi Degree College.

== Nearest cities ==
- Warangal-50 km
- Suryapet-59 km
- Khammam-73 km
- Hyderabad-146 km
- Mahabubabad-40 km

== Transportation ==
Road is the only means of transportation to Thorrur. Nearby railway stations are Warangal, Mahabubabad, Kesamudram and Khammam. Nearest airport is Rajiv Gandhi International Airport, Hyderabad. TSRTCthorrur bus depot buses connect Thorrur to important surrounding cities/towns like Hyderabad, Warangal, Suryapet, Jangaon, Khammam and Mahabubabad etc. In addition, buses connect to surrounding villages of Thorrur.
