= Thorrur, Ranga Reddy district =

Thorrur
- town
- Location in Telangana, India Thorrur (India)
- Coordinates: 17.1722°N 78.3650°E
- Country: India
- State: Telangana
- District: RangaReddy
- Talukas: Hayathnagar

Population
  - Total: 7,000

Languages
  - Official: Telugu
- Time zone: UTC+5:30 (IST)
- PIN: 501511
- Telephone code: 040 -HYD code only

Thorrur is a gram panchayat and village in Hayanth Nagar mandal in Ranga Reddy district in the Indian state of Telangana.

== Politics ==
Thorrur lies in the Ibrahimpatnam assembly constituency and in Bhongir parliamentary constituency. Until 2008, Thorrur was in Malakpet assembly constituency. Thorrur is the center of attraction of politics and political leaders in the mandal as well as the district. MLA Malreddy Rangareddy hails from the village.

== Demographics ==
Thorrur has a population of around 7,000. People of all castes and sects reside there. The primary languages are Telugu basically with a Telangana dialect, Hindi, Urdu, and English. Also the renowned Ramoji film city is also 12 km from Thorrur. There is a bypass road which goes through Thorrur to each of these places.

== Economy ==
The primary occupation is agriculture. An upswing in real estate development had a positive impact on living conditions.

== Temples ==
Thorrur hosts 200-year-old Renuka Ellamma temple. The bonalu festival is celebrated at Renuka Ellamma and Pochmma temples. Devotees perform pujas to Goddesses Renuka Ellamma and Pochamma.

Other prominent temples include Mallana Temple (Mallikarujuna swami), Ranganayakula Temple, Renuka Pochhamma Temple, Hanuman Temple, and Berrapa Temple. Sanghi Temple is 10 km from Thorrur.

== Rajiv Gruhakalpa colony ==
The A.P. housing board and state government provided a housing colony with basic facilities to the poor people who lived in Hyderabad from many years and don't have own house so far. Around 35 building blocks were constructed, each consisting of 32 flats (16-16 of either side) and are allotted to the registered.

== Surya Nagar Colony ==
Suryanagar colony includes around 40 independent houses.

== Transport ==
Transport is available to Thorrur from Hyderabad and Secunderabad. TSRTC runs busses from Hayath Nagar, Kothi, Dilsukhnagar, Secunderabad and Jublee Bus station to Thorrur. The roads have been well laid and the infrastructure well developed for transportation. The TSRTC bus route numbers are as follows:
