= Narsimhulapet =

- Village
- Location in Telangana, India Narsimhulapet (India)
- Coordinates: 17.51°N 79.804444°E
- Country: India
- State: Telangana
- District: Mahabubabad district
- Talukas: Mahabubabad

Languages
  - Official: Telugu
- Time zone: UTC+5:30 (IST)
- PIN: 506324
- Telephone code: 91-8719
- Vehicle registration: TS 03
- Website: telangana.gov.in

Narsimhulapet is a village and Mandal headquarter in Mahabubabad district (also called Manukota) of the state of Telangana, India. Narsimhulapet is named after a temple of Lakshmi Narasimha Swamy built during the Kakatiya dynasty. Narsimhulapet is part of Dornakal constituency in Telangana Legislative Assembly.

== Geography ==
Narsimhulapet is located 5 kilometers from the Warangal Khammam highway. 28 Kilometers away from Mahabubabad and 25 Kilometers away from Thorrur. Best Place To Visit Venkateshwara Swamy Temple in This Village.

== Panchayats ==
1. Agapeta
2. Beerishettigudem
3. Bojjannapeta
4. Danthalapalle
5. Datla
6. Erralachaiahgudem
7. Gundamrajupalli
8. Gunnepalle
9. Jayapuram
10. Kommulavancha
11. Kowsalyadevipalle
12. Kummarikuntla
13. Mungimadugu
14. Narsimhulapet
15. Padamatigudem
16. Peddamupparam
17. Peddanagaram
18. Ramannagudem
19. Ramanujapuram
20. Reponi
21. Vanthadupula
22. Vemulapally

== Temples ==
1. Venkateshwara Swamy Temple
2. Lakshmi Narasimha Swamy Temple
3. Shiva Temple
4. Tirupathamma Thalli Temple
5. ganga temple
6. Kaatamayya temple
7. hanuman temple
