= Kavitha Maloth =

Indian politician

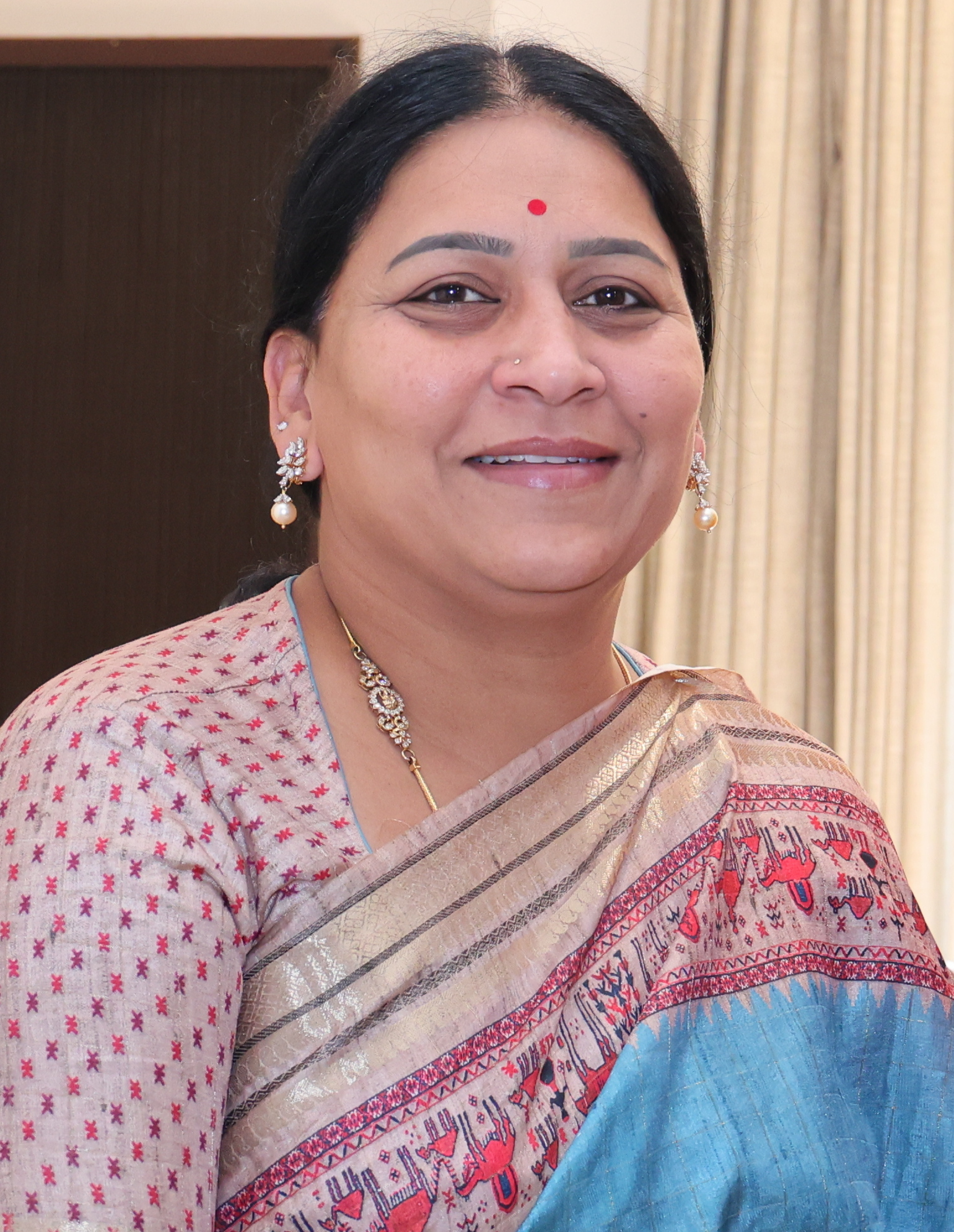
- Preceded by: Azmeera Seetaram Naik
- Succeeded by: Balram Naik
- Constituency: Mahbubabad

Personal details
- Born: 20 November 1980 (age 45) Warangal
- Party: Telangana Rashtra Samithi
- Spouse(s): Bhadru Maloth, I.T.S,.
- Children: Nayan Maloth, Mahathi Maloth

Kavitha Maloth (born 1981) is an Indian politician and a Member of Parliament from Mahbubabad constituency. She is the daughter of Redya Nayak, and started her political career in 2009 with Indian National Congress, she was elected as MLA of Mahabubabad in 2009 general election.

== Early life ==
Kavitha Maloth was born in Banjara community. she is daughter of leader Dharamsoth Redya Naik.

== Career ==
Maloth was elected from Mahbubabad constituency in 2019, and lost in 2024 Elections.

She is married to Bhadru Naik.
