= Peddavangara mandal =

Coordinates: 17°30′35″N 80°09′34″E

Peddavangara
- Mandal
- Interactive map of Peddavangara
- Country: India
- State: Telangana
- District: Mahabubabad

Government
  - Type: Telangana

Languages Telugu
  - Official: Telugu
- Time zone: UTC+5:30 (IST)
- PIN: 506317
- Telephone code: 08716
- Nearest city Warangal: Jangaon
- Vidhan Sabha constituency: Palakurthi (Assembly constituency)
- Climate: hot (Köppen)

Peddavangara is a mandal in Mahabubabad district, Telangana, India. MLA Palakurthi Constituency Yashaswini Reddy
