= Gudur (Mahabubabad district) =

- Mandal
- Gudur
- Location in Telangana, India Gudur (India)
- Coordinates: 17°50′15″N 79°57′40″E
- Talukas: Gudur

Area
  - Total: 2,864 ha (7,080 acres)

Population (2011)
  - Total: 11,174
  - Density: 390.2/km^{2} (1,010/sq mi)

Languages
  - Official: Telugu
- Postal code: 506134
- Area code: 08718
- Website: https://mahabubabad.telangana.gov.in/

Gudur is a village and also a mandal in Mahabubabad District of Telangana State, India. The Gudur mandal headquarters are situated in Gudur.

== Poltical history ==
Kodidala Sanjay Kumar served as ZPTC here in long term from 2006 to 2014 from TDP as significant leader from the political history of Gudur mahabubabad

== History ==
Gudur has significant leaders who played a prominent roles in the Telangana movement and sacrificed their lives.

Many political leaders were actively involved in Telangana movement at Gudur as Vem narendar reddy and sanjay kumar as other politicians

== Demographics ==
According to 2011 Census of India, Gudur has a population of 11174 and number of households are 2574. Female Population is 50.2%. Its literacy rate is 57.4% and the female literacy rate is 24.5%. It has significant amount of scheduled tribes population, called Lambadi and Koya (tribe) with about 43.7%.

Demographics of Gudur mandal (2011)
1. Koya (tribe) (45.0%)
2. Lambadi (25.2%)
3. others (30.8%)

== Mines ==
Gudur mandal is rich in Iron ore which is spread over 2500 hectares. In 2010, the erstwhile AP Government has allocated 5,342 hectares of Iron ore mining to a joint venture of AP Minerals Development Corporation Ltd and Rakshana Consortium, a private company and was cancelled in 2013 by AP Govt headed by Kiran Kumar Reddy and he allocated them to the Rashtriya Ispat Nigam Ltd. (VSP). It led to a controversy and the Ministry of Mines cancelled all permits to mine Iron ore in this region. In 2014, Telangana State had emerged and TRS Party has formed the government with one of the slogans Bayyaram Ukku, Telangana Hakku.

== Villages ==
There are 25 villages in Gudur Mandal. They are the following:

Bupathipet
Adivarmpet
Vangapet
Keshavapatnam
Seethanagaram
Ponugudu
Gudur
Ootla
Madanapur
Ayodhyapur
Macherla
Gundenga
Gajulaghat
Bollepally
Rajanpally
Naikapalle
Dameravancha
Matwada
Neelavancha
Teegalaveni
Govindhapuram
Apparajpalle
Kollapur
Boddugonda
Kangaragidda
