= Pakhal Lake =

Man-made lake in Telangana, India

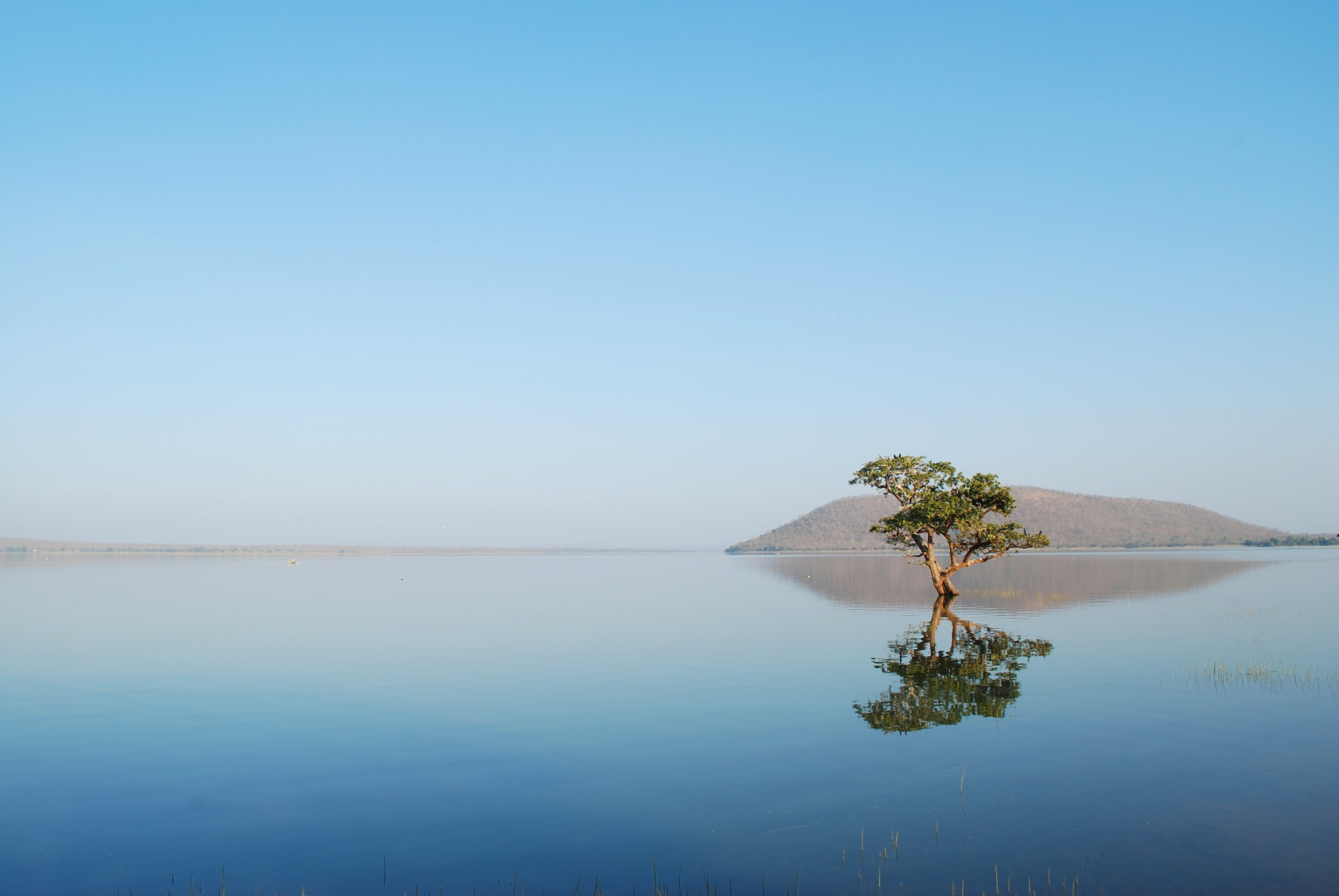
- View of Pakhal Lake

- Location within India
- Location: Warangal, Telangana
- Coordinates: 17°57′10″N 80°00′05″E
- Type: Reservoir
- Basin countries: India

Pakhal Lake is a man-made lake in the Pakhal Wildlife Sanctuary in the Warangal district of Telangana, a state in Southern India.

== History ==
Pakhal lake is man-made lake which was built during kakatiya rule. This lake was built in 1213 AD by the Kakatiya King Ganapati Deva. It was built to serve as source of water for irrigational purpose. It was built on a tributary of River Krishna. Pakhal Lake Warangal has become a popular place for tourists to visit and relax. It's mesmerising natural beauty and peaceful surroundings make it an ideal place to spend a few tranquil moments. The enchanting beauty of this lake can be easily seen in pakhal lake photos.

Pakhal Lake is an artificial lake situated in the Pakhal sanctuary close to Warangal City in Telangana. Believed to have been constructed in 1213 A.D by order of the Kakatiya King Ganapathidev, Jagadhala Mummudi Nayudu constructed the lake by the orders of the king the lake encompasses an area of 30 km^{2}. Set around the lake is the Pakhal Wildlife Sanctuary spread over an area of 900 km^{2}.

== Tourism ==
Pakhal Lake, situated amidst forested undulating hills and dales, is a popular tourist retreat. Set around the shores of this lake is the Pakhal Wild Life Sanctuary with an area of 839 km^{2}. It is a dense forest shelter with a variety of flora and fauna.

== Fauna ==
Many wild animals have found refuge around the lake, such as leopards, panthers, wild boars, hyenas, sloths and others. Cobras, pythons, crocodiles and many species of migratory birds can also be seen here.

== Location ==
Pakhal lake Wild Life Sanctuary is accessible by road from Warangal city, located nearly 54 km away. Pakhal Lake is situated about 50 km east of Warangal and 10 km from Narsampet Town. It is well connected by road, tourists can get there via state-run buses or by private vehicles.
