= Maripeda =

Maripeda Maripeda Maripeda Bunglow
- urban
- Nickname: Maripeda
- Location in Telangana, India Maripeda (India)
- Coordinates: 17.372013°N 79.880744°E
- Country: India
- State: Telangana
- District: Mahabubabad
- Talukas: Maripeda

Languages
  - Official: Telugu
- Time zone: UTC+5:30 (IST)
- Vehicle registration: TS-26
- Website: telangana.gov.in

Maripeda is a municipality and mandal in Mahabubabad district, Telangana, India.

== Panchayats ==
There are 25 village panchayats in Maripeda mandal.

- Abbaipalem
- Anepur
- Bavojigudem
- Beechrajpalle
- Burhanpur
- Chillamcherla
- Dharmaram
- Thanda Dharmaram
- Erjerla
- Galivarigudem & thanda
- Giripuram
- Gundepudi
- Jayyaram
- Maripeda
- Neelikurthy
- Purushottamaigudem
- Rampur
- Thalla Ookal
- venkampad
- Thanamcherla
- Yellampeta
