= Mahabubabad =

Mahabubabad Manukota
- City
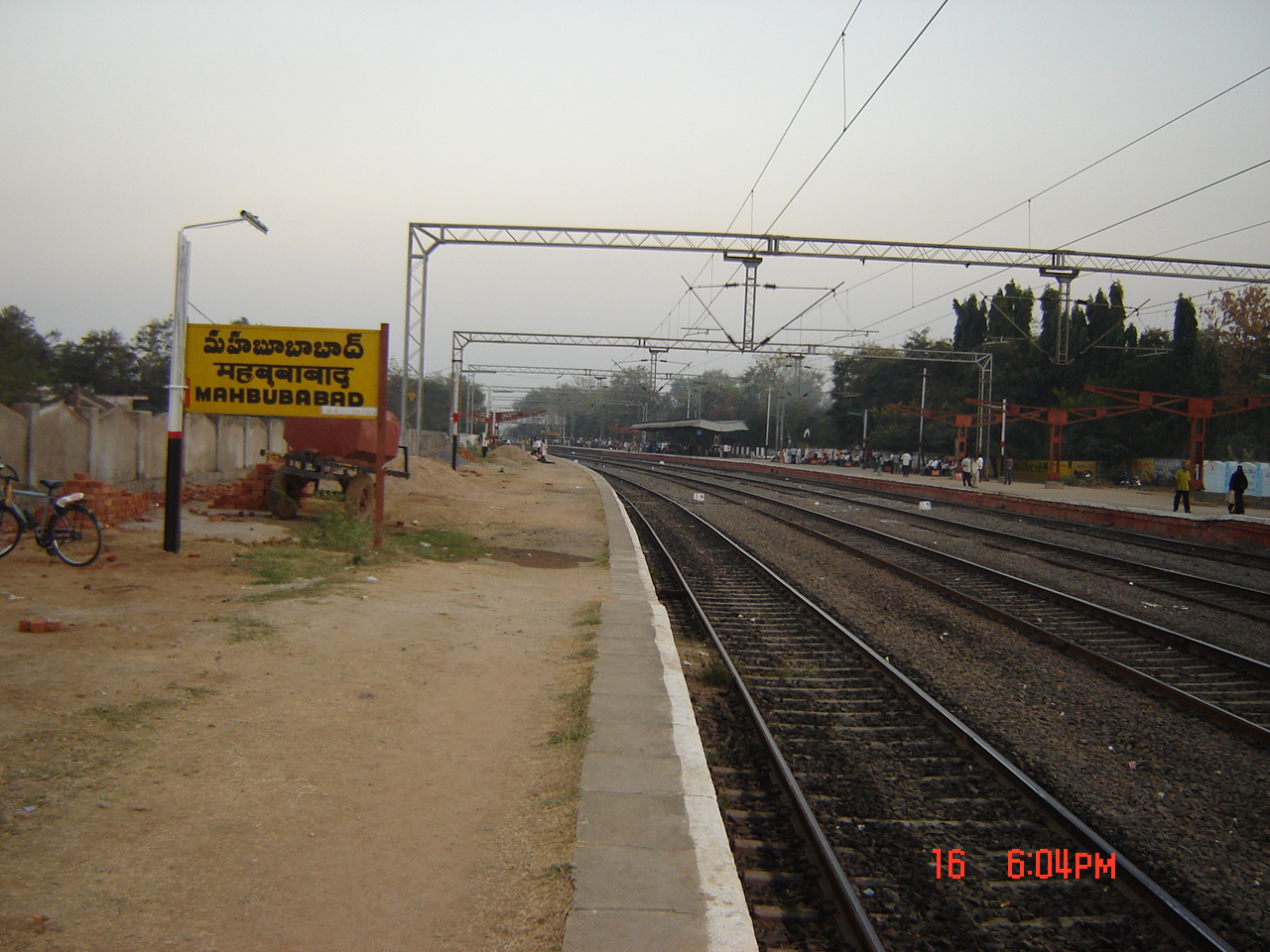
- Mahbubabad Railway Station (renovation January 2008)
- Nickname: Village of Fortress with Trees
- Location in Telangana, India Mahabubabad (India)
- Coordinates: 17.6167°N 80.0167°E
- Country: India
- State: Telangana
- Region: Telangana
- District: Mahabubabad district
- Established: October 2016

Government
  - District collector: Sri Adwait Kumar Singh, IAS
  - Member of Parliament: Balram Naik (Indian National Congress)
  - Member of Legislative Assembly: Dr. Murali Naik Bhukya ( Congress)

Area
  - Total: 44.99 km^{2} (17.37 sq mi)
  - Rank: 13th
- Elevation: 177 m (581 ft)
- Demonym: Mahabubabadi

Languages
  - Official: Telugu and Hindi
- Time zone: UTC+5:30 (IST)
- PIN: 506 101,506102
- Telephone code: 08719
- Vehicle registration: TS–26
- Lok Sabha constituency: Mahbubabad
- Vidhan Sabha constituency: Mahbubabad
- Website: telangana.gov.in

Mahabubabad, formerly known as Manukota, is a city and the district headquarters of Mahabubabad district in the Indian state of Telangana. It is on the west bank of the Munneru, a tributary of the Krishna. Mahabubabad is known for the Bayyaram Mines.

== Etymology ==
Mahabubabad comes from Manukota, which in turn comes from Mranukota. In telugu Mranu means “Tree” and Kota means “Fort”. Manukota used to be covered with plenty of trees like a fort. When the Nizam ruler Mahabub Ali Khan visited the city, Manukota changed as Mahabubabad. He once arrived Manukota before Independence and stayed outside of the town in a place which is called “Shikarkhana”. The name of Manukota by the passage of the time, hence changed to Mahabubabad.

== Weather ==
Mahabubabad

Climate chart (precipitation, max. and min. temperature)
J	F	M	A	M	J	J	A	S	O	N	D
- █ Average max. and min. temperatures in °C
- █ Precipitation totals in mm
Imperial conversion
J	F	M	A	M	J	J	A	S	O	N	D
- █ Average max. and min. temperatures in °F
- █ Precipitation totals in inches

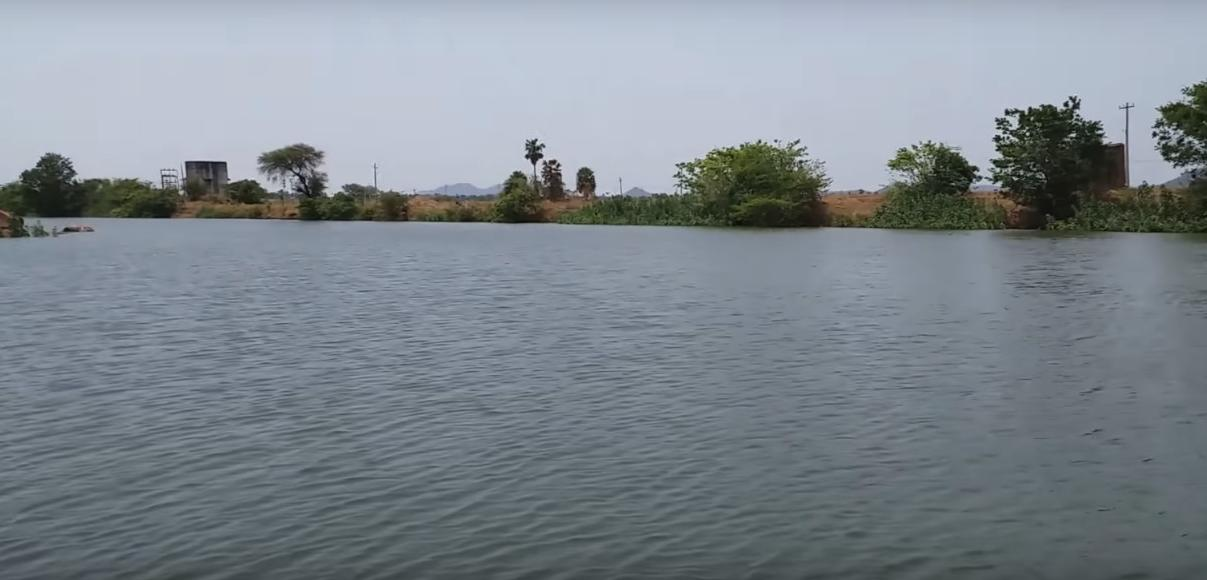
River Krishna tributary Munneru.

Mahbubabad has a semi-tropical climate. During summers, the temperatures soar to more than 48 °C. In winters, temperatures range between 12 °C and 27 °C. Mahbubabad receives the northeast and the southwest monsoon, from June to September, and from October to November respectively.

== Demographics ==
The population of Mahabubabad municipality is around approximately 72,000 according to 2011 census reports. The male population is 34,776 (48.3%) and the female is 37,224 (51.6%). The female-to-male ratio is 1068:1000, which is above the national average 943:1000. The literacy rate is 79.17%, more than national average 74%. Male literacy is 86.59%, which is more than national average of 82.10%, and female literacy rate is 72.32%, more than national average 65.50%. Once it was the biggest revenue division in Telangana state, even bigger than Hanamkonda village. Later it was divided into two divisions.

Demographics of Mahabubabad Town (2011)
1. Hinduism 86.38 (84.9%)
2. Islam 12.59 (12.4%)
3. Christianity 2.75 (2.70%)

The majority of the villages and the hamlets including the city are the habitats of Scheduled Tribes (75%). The tribal community is Lambadi. Thus the majority of people of the city will communicate in the special tribal language, Lambadi or Banjara (60%). This language is one among the officially recognised dialects by the government of India. This language has no script and is sustained on spoken words.

== Government and politics ==
Mahabubabad Municipality was constituted in 2011 and is classified as a second grade municipality. The jurisdiction of the civic body is spread over an area of 44.99 km^{2} (17.37 mi^{2}).

=== Politics ===
Mahabubabad Municipality ward has a total of 36 wards. Mahabubabad has one seat for the state Assembly constituency. In the elections held in December 2023, Dr. Murali Naik Bhukya of the Indian National Congress was elected as the Member of Legislative Assembly (MLA) from Mahabubabad. It is a grade 2 municipality. The R.D.O. and M.R.O. look after the revenue administration. Earlier, Hanamkonda and Warangal were two Lok Sabha Constituencies in the same area, but recently, the Election Commission of India, based on the population census, has shifted the Warangal Lok Sabha Constituency to Mahabubabad.

== Education ==
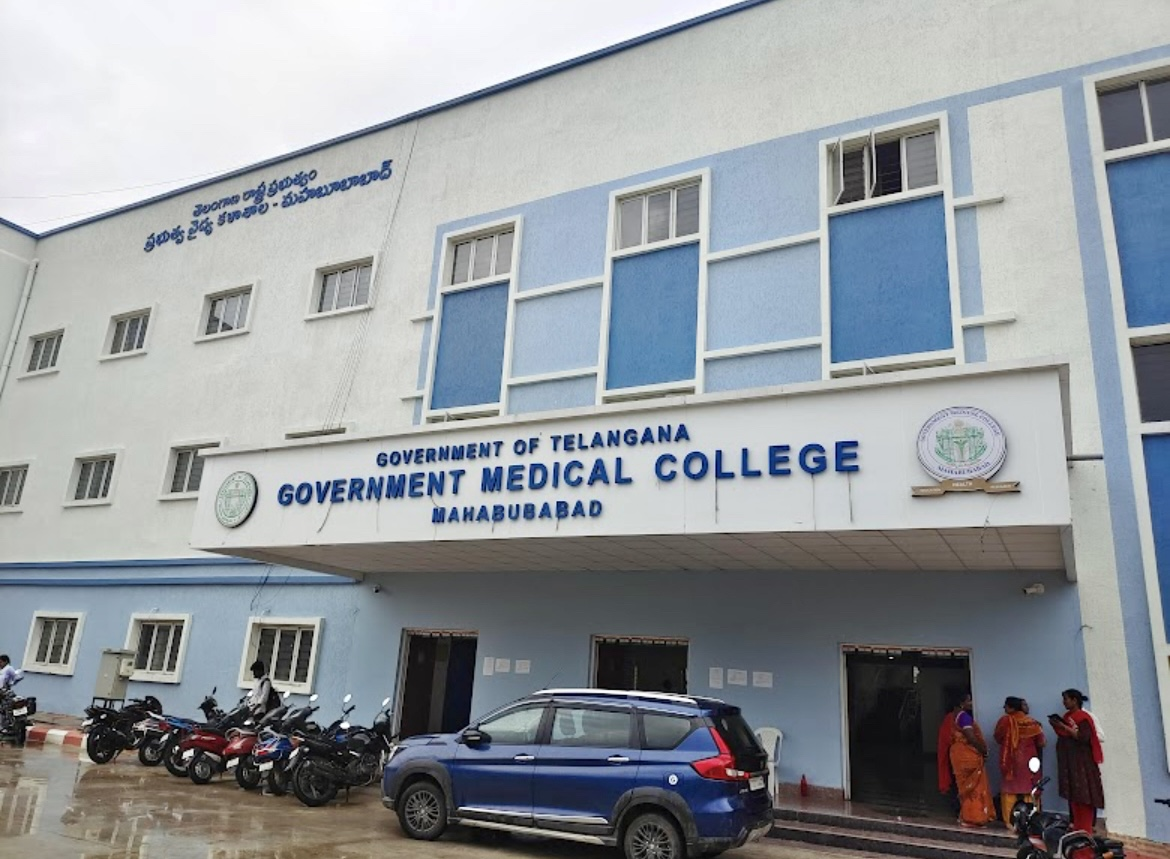
Government Medical College, Mahbubabad

Mahabubabad has a variety of educational institutions. It has a Government Medical College inaugurated in 2022.

== Nearest cities ==
- Khammam-50 km
- Warangal-73 km
- Suryapet-83 km
- Hyderabad-212 km
- Garla - 20 km
- Dornakal - 24.5 km

== Transport ==
Mahabubabad is well connected with road and rail routes to every other places of the state and the nation. It is a bridge between Telangana and Andhra Pradesh.

=== Roadways ===
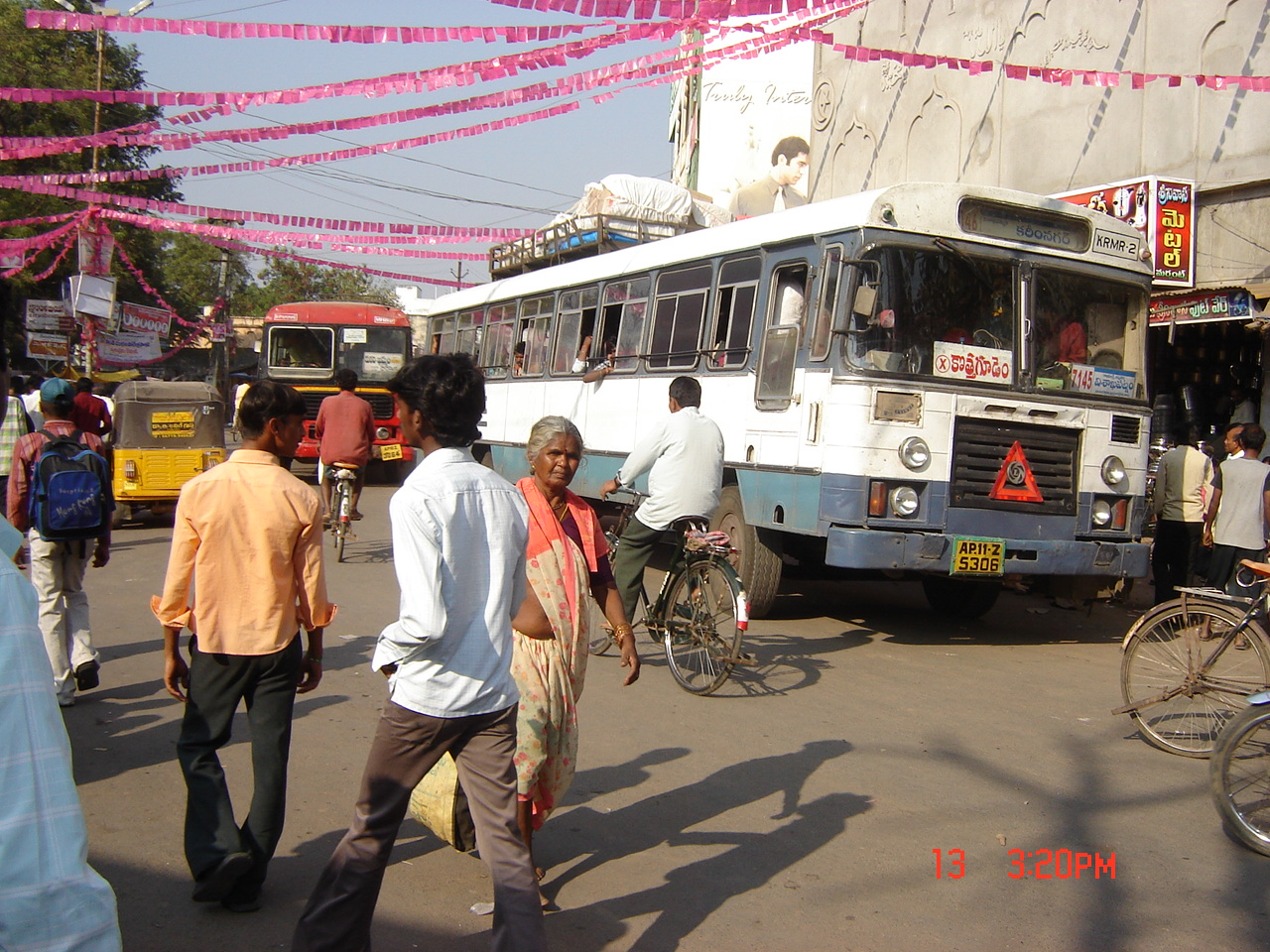
Busy center and bus stop at railway station, looking toward Bus Stand Road

Mahabubabad has a bus depot of TSRTC with 100-bus capacity. It has many services for the needs of the citizens. It falls on the main route of Warangal-Bhadrachalam. National Highway 365 (India) passes through the town. As well as National Highway 930P (India). Nearly 20,000 people go from here daily through the bus facilities. In addition, apart from the main bus stand, to meet the needs of the passengers there are Kuravi bus stand, Thorruur bus stand, Pusalapalli bus stop, and many seven-seat autorickshaws and Commander Jeeps connecting the nearby villages.

=== Railways ===
Mahabubabad has one of the busiest railway stations in the Kazipet-Vijayawada route. Nearly as many as 4000 passengers travel through this system daily. People here will prefer rail route than to bus route to reach distant destinations. The Mahabubabad railway station had been graded as 'B1-Category Railway Station' by the South Central Railway from 2004.

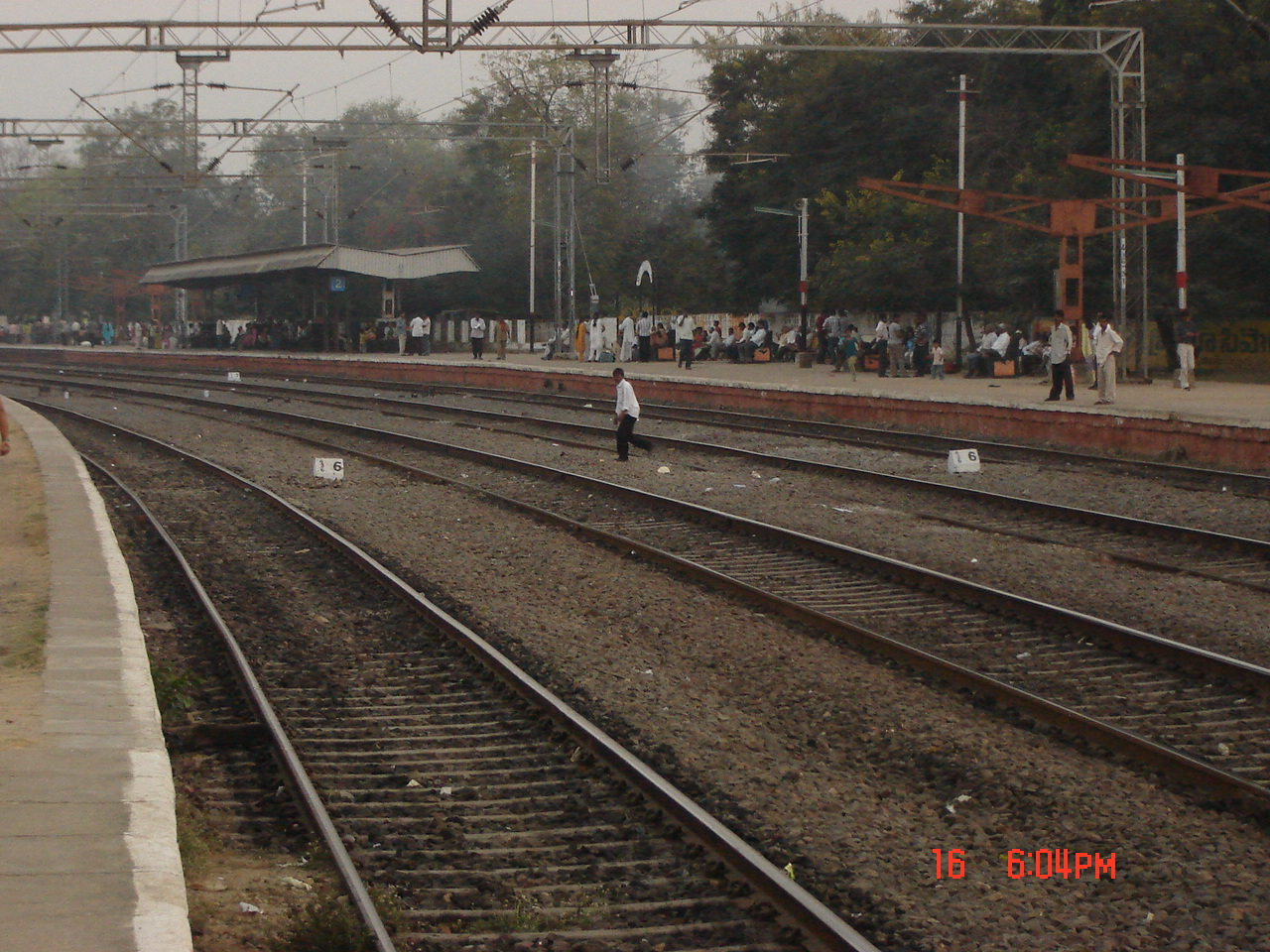
Platforms of Mahabubabad Railway Station, under renovation during January 2008

== Media ==
Mahabubabad has print and entertainment media. There is also Citi Cable, a local entertainment channel for broadcasting TV and for internet there is also ISP providers like Anusha broadband, hireach broadband services.

=== Print media ===
The leading Telugu newspapers have their regional centres here for updating the news.
