= Mahabubabad district =

Coordinates: 17.6°N 80.0°E

- District of Telangana
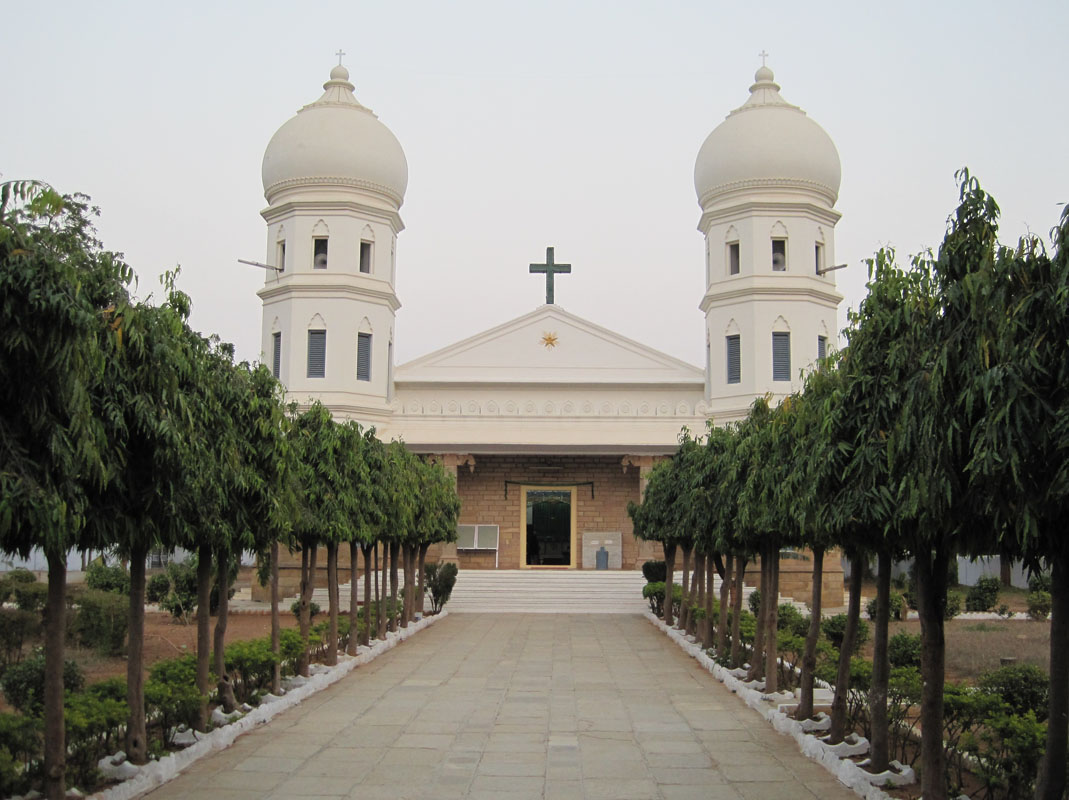
- Epiphany Cathedral, Dornakal
- Interactive map of Mahabubabad district
- Country: India
- State: Telangana
- Headquarters: Mahabubabad
- Mandalas: 16

Government
  - District collector: Sri V.P.Goutham
  - Parliament constituencies: Mahabubabad
  - Assembly constituencies: Mahabubabad, Dornakal

Area
  - Total: 2,876.70 km^{2} (1,110.70 sq mi)

Population (2011)
  - Total: 774,549
  - Density: 269.249/km^{2} (697.352/sq mi)
- Time zone: UTC+05:30 (IST)
- Vehicle registration: TG–26
- Website: mahabubabad.telangana.gov.in

Mahabubabad district is a district in the Indian state of Telangana. The district shares boundaries with Suryapet, Khammam, Bhadradri, Warangal, Mulugu and Jangaon districts.

== Etymology ==
Mahabubabad comes from Manukota, which in turn comes from Mranukota. In telugu Mranu means “Tree” and Kota means “Fort”. Manukota used to be covered with plenty of trees like a fort. When the Nizam ruler Mahabub Ali Khan visited the city, Manukota changed as Mahabubabad. He once arrived Manukota before Independence and stayed outside of the town in a place which is called “Shikarkhana”. The name of Manukota by the passage of the time, hence changed to Mahabubabad.

== Geography ==
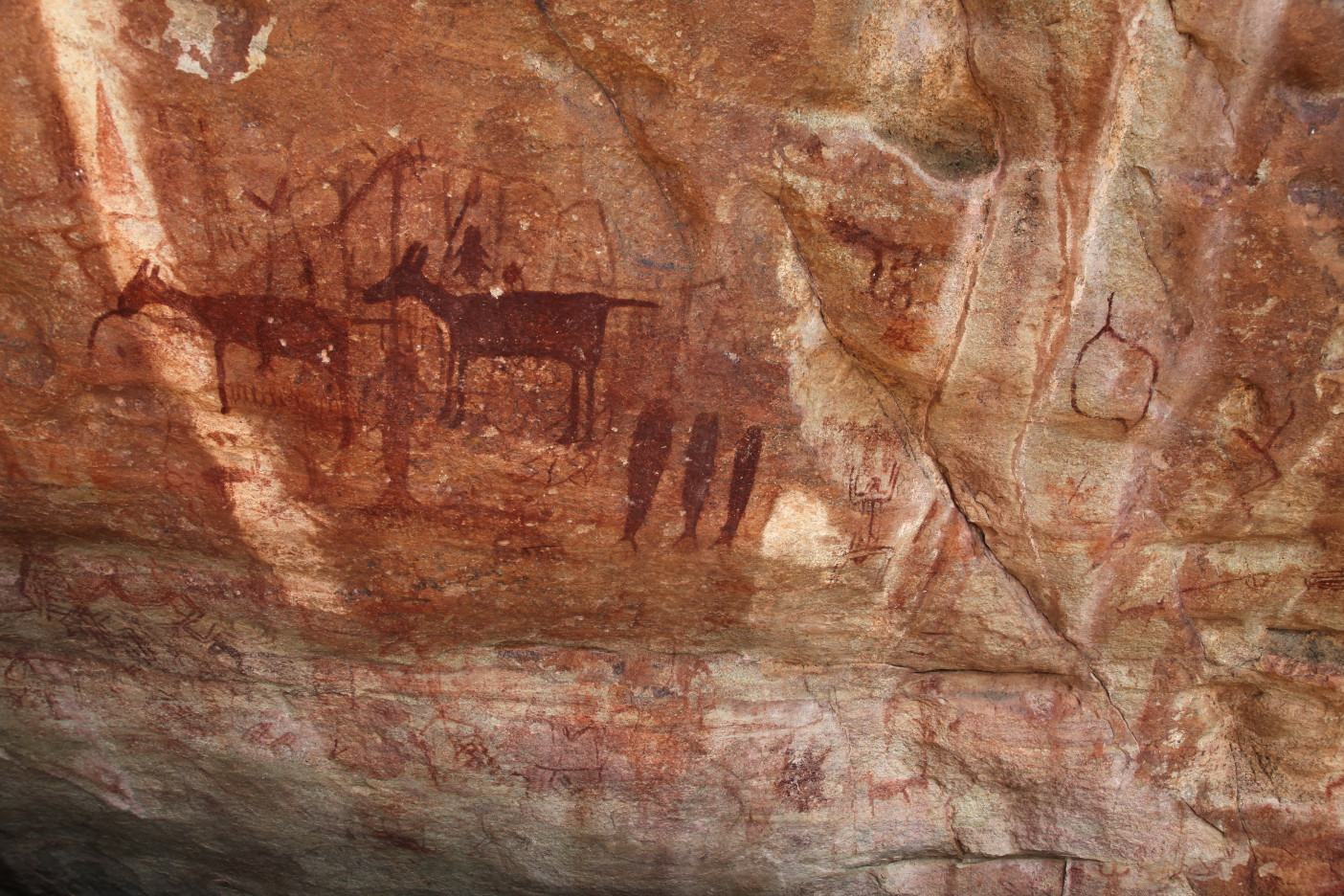
Pandavula Guttalu

The district is spread over an area of 2,876.70 square kilometres (1,110.70 sq mi). The region is mostly plain with occasional hillocks. Most of the land is used for agriculture. The mandals Bayyaram and Garla have rich iron ore and coal deposits. It also has Bheemunipadam waterfall and Edubavula waterfall. There are several popular hillocks such as Pandavula Gutta in Bayyaram Mandal (Pandavula Guhalu, Thirumalagiri is different one, located in Jayshankar Bhupalpally district, east of Warangal).

The district is also famous for Kuravi Veerabhadra Swamy temple

== Demographics ==
Religion in Mahabubabad district (2011)
Hinduism	95.89%
Islam	3.28%
Christianity	0.51%
Other or not stated	0.32%

As of 2011 Census of India, the district has a population of 774,549. Mahabubabad has a sex ratio of 996 females per 1000 males and a literacy rate of 57.13%. 81,082 (10.47%) were under 6 years of age. 76,376 (9.86%) lived in urban areas. Scheduled Castes and Scheduled Tribes made up 104,508 (13.49%) and 292,778 (37.80%) of the population respectively.

Languages of Mahabubabad district (2011)
1. Telugu (66.4%)
2. Lambadi (30.2%)
3. Urdu (2.59%)
4. Others (0.74%)

At the time of the 2011 census, 66.42% of the population spoke Telugu, 30.25% Lambadi and 2.59% Urdu as their first language.

== Administrative divisions ==
The district has two revenue divisions, Mahabubabad and Thorrur and is sub-divided into 18 mandals.

=== Mandals ===
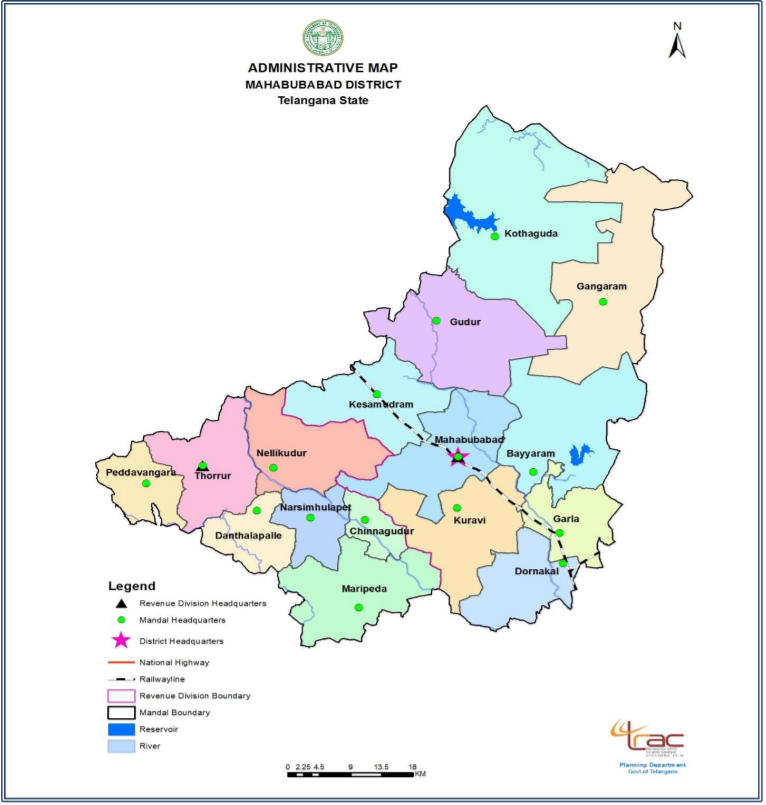
Mahbubabad District Map

The district has sixteen mandals .

The following are the list of mandals.

- Mahabubabad
- Kuravi
- Kesamudram
- Dornakal
- Gudur
- Kothaguda
- Gangaram
- Bayyaram
- Garla
- Chinnagudur
- Danthalapalle
- Thorrur
- Nellikudur
- Maripeda
- Narsimhulapet
- Peddavangara
- Seerole
- Inugurthy

The following are the top 10 population towns&villages 2011 census max.

- 1st Mahabubabad 72,000 మున్సిపాలిటీ
- 2nd Thorrur 20,000
- 3rd Maripeda 18,000
- 4th Dornakal 16,000
- 5th Bayyaram 15,000
- 6th Garla 14,000
- 7th Kesamudram 13,000
- 8th Gudur 12,000
- 9th Inugurthi 10,000
- 10th Kuravi 9,000

== See also ==
- List of districts in Telangana
