= 2014 Andhra Pradesh Legislative Assembly election =

- 30 April and 7 May 2014

All 175 seats in the Andhra Pradesh Legislative Assembly All 119 seats in the Telangana Legislative Assembly 88 (Andhra Pradesh) seats needed for a majority 60 (Telangana) seats needed for a majority
- Registered: 64,934,138
- Turnout: 48,492,467 (74.68%) ▲2.04%
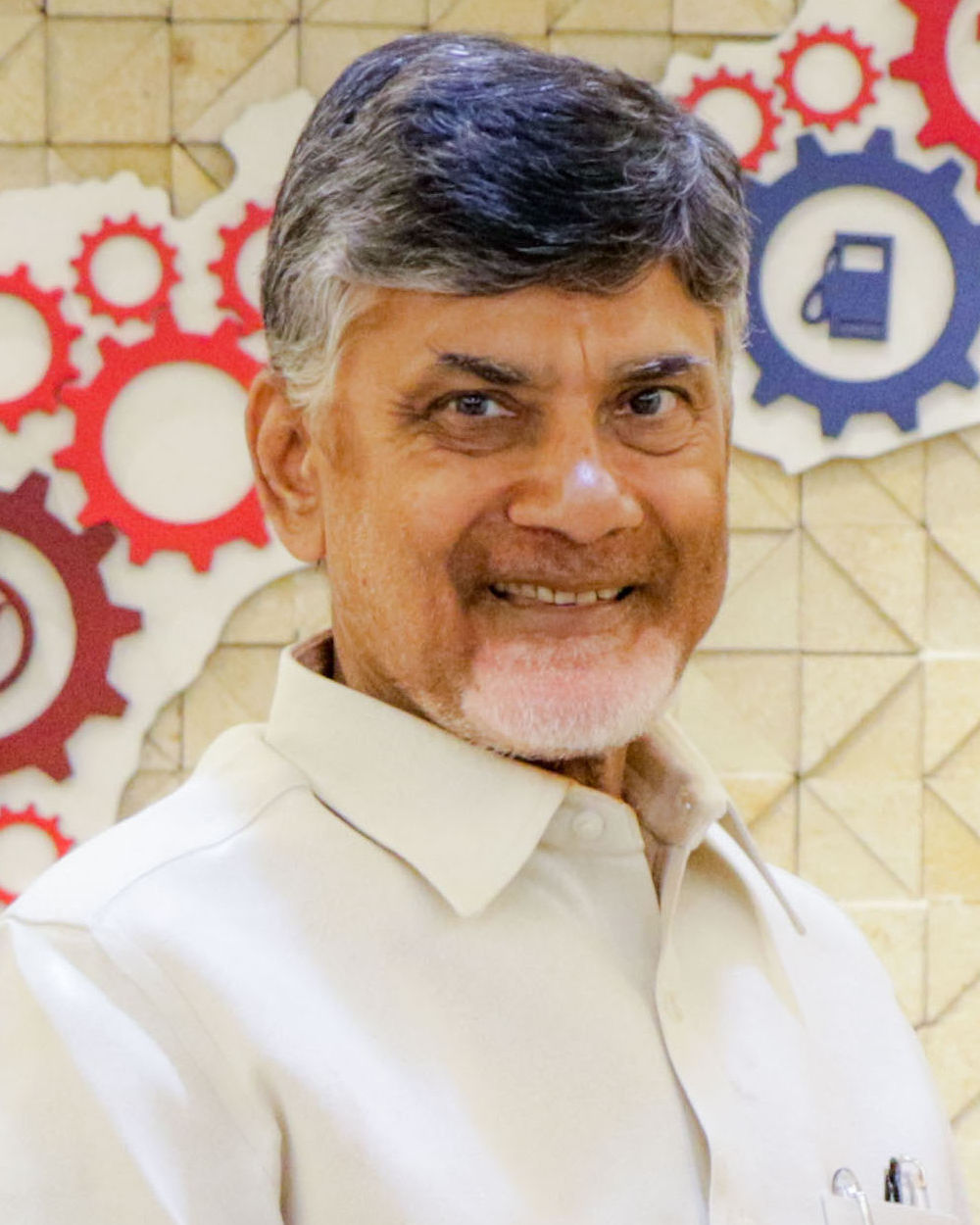

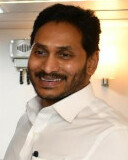

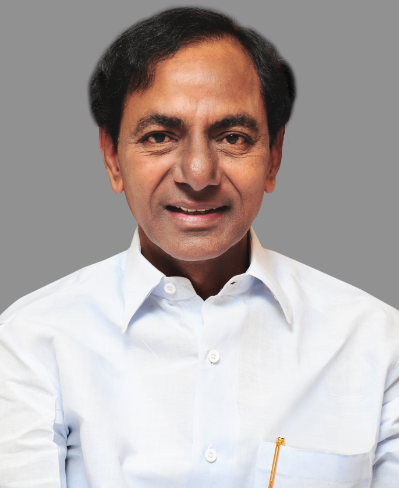

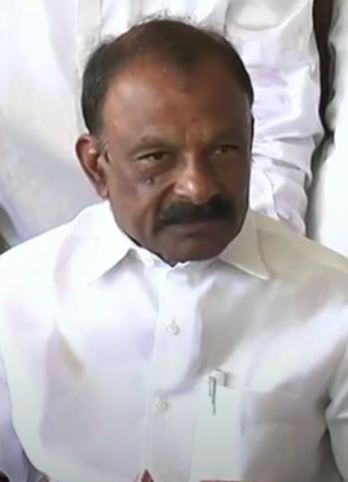

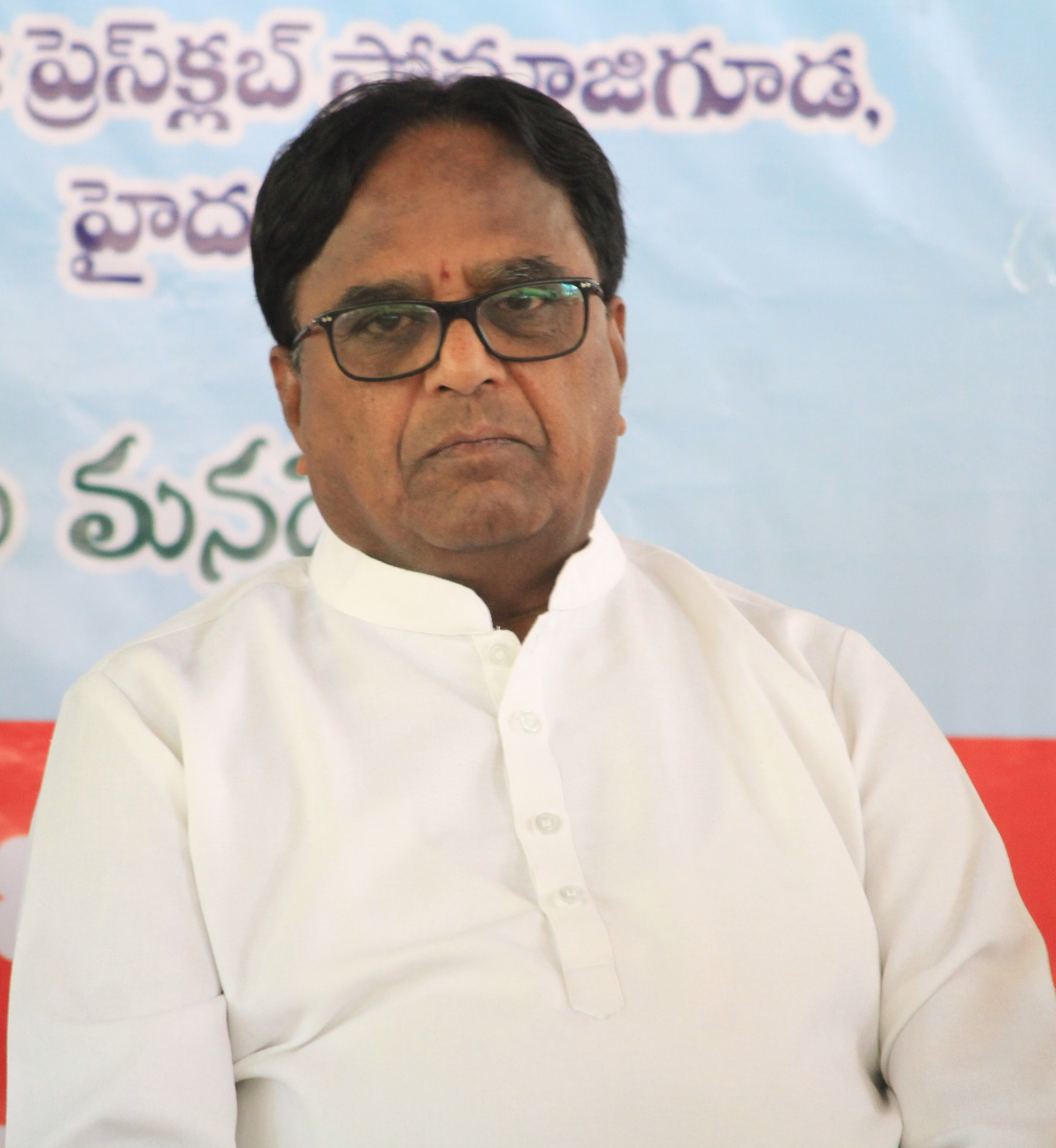

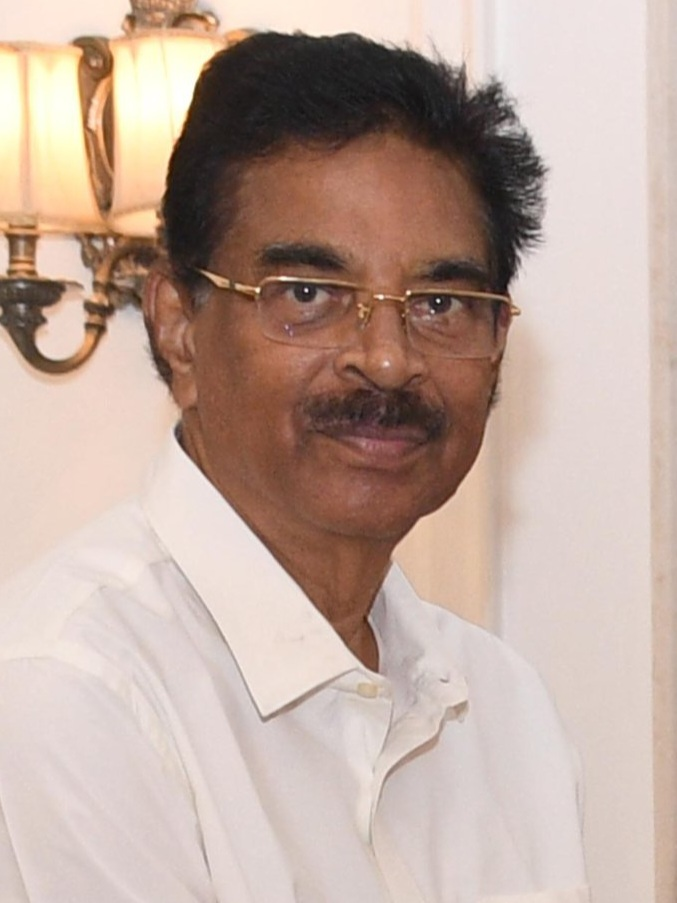

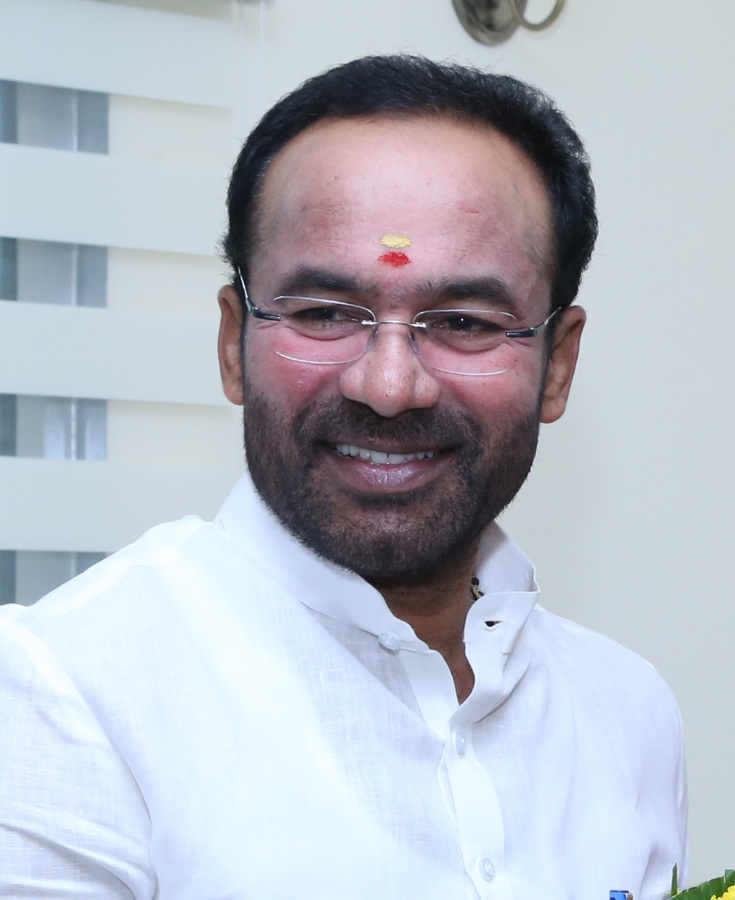

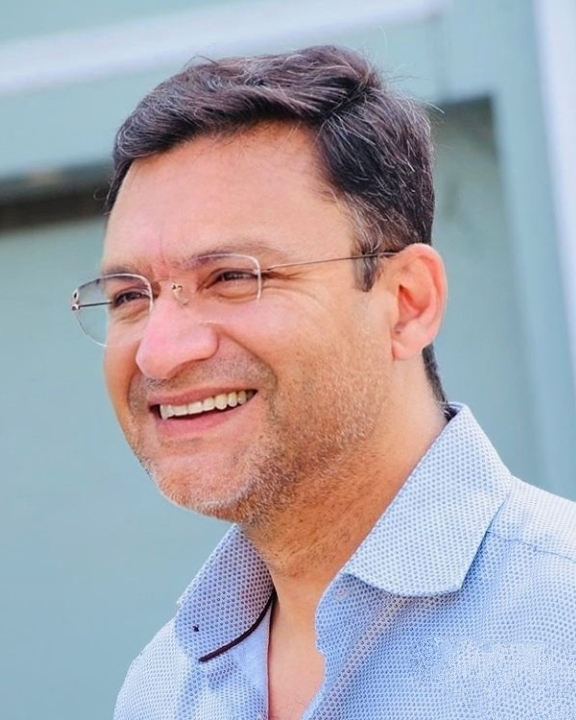
| | Majority party | Minority party | Third party |
|---|---|---|---|
| Leader | N. Chandrababu Naidu | Y. S. Jagan Mohan Reddy | K. Chandrashekar Rao |
| Party | TDP | YSRCP | TRS |
| Alliance | NDA | – | – |
| Leader since | 1995 | 2009 | 2001 |
| Leader's seat | Kuppam (won) | Pulivendla (won) | Gajwel (won) |
| Last election | 92 seats, 28.12% | Party did not exist (Note: Despite the party contesting in the 2012 Andhra Pradesh Legislative Assembly by-election, it is not considered part of the regular five-year electoral cycle.) | 10 seats, 3.99% |
| Seats won | 117 | 70 | 63 |
| Seat change | ▲25 | New party | ▲53 |
| Popular vote | 15,746,215 | 13,494,076 | 6,620,326 |
| Percentage | 32.53% | 27.88% | 13.68% |
| Swing | ▲4.41% | New party | ▲9.64% |
| | Fourth party | Fifth party | Sixth party |
| Leader | Raghu Veera Reddy (AP); Ponnala Lakshmaiah (TG) | Kambhampati Hari Babu (AP); G. Kishan Reddy (TG) | Akbaruddin Owaisi |
| Party | INC | BJP | AIMIM |
| Alliance | UPA | NDA | – |
| Leader since | 2014 | 2010 | 1999 |
| Leader's seat | Penukonda (lost) (AP); Jangaon (lost) (TG) | Did not contest (Note: Contested and won from the Visakhapatnam Lok Sabha constituency in the simultaneously conducted 2014 Indian general election in Andhra Pradesh.) (AP); Amberpet (won) (TG) | Chandrayangutta (won) |
| Last election | 156 seats, 36.56% | 2 | 7 |
| Seats won | 21 | 9 | 7 |
| Seat change | ▼135 | ▲7 | No change |
| Popular vote | 5,668,061 | 2,000,677 | 737,134 |
| Percentage | 11.71% | 4.13% | 1.52% |
| Swing | ▼24.84% | ▲1.29% | ▲0.69% |
Chief Minister before election
Vacant (President's rule)
Chief Minister after election
N. Chandrababu Naidu
TDP
(Andhra Pradesh)
K. Chandrashekar Rao
TRS
(Telangana)

The 2014 Andhra Pradesh Legislative Assembly election took place on 30 April and 7 May 2014 to elect members to the legislatures of Andhra Pradesh and Telangana. It was held concurrently with the Indian general election. The results were declared on 16 May 2014. The Telugu Desam Party led by N. Chandrababu Naidu won a majority of the 175 seats in the residual Andhra Pradesh, while Telangana Rashtra Samithi led by K. Chandrashekar Rao won in the new state of Telangana.

== Previous Assembly ==
In the 2009 Andhra Pradesh Legislative Assembly election, Congress had taken the lead, winning 156 of the 294 seats in the Assembly. As the leader of the Congress Legislature Party, Y. S. Rajasekhara Reddy was invited to form the government by Governor N. D. Tiwari.

Unexpectedly, the Government lasted for 4 years 9 months, and the president rule was imposed later which expired on 10 March 2014. The Election Commission of India (ECI) decided to hold the Assembly elections along with the general election. The election in each Assembly constituency (AC) was held in the same phase as the election to the corresponding Parliamentary constituency that the AC falls under.

== Background ==
On 3 October 2013, the Union Cabinet of India approved the creation of the new State of Telangana. On 2 June 2014 the President of India, Pranab Mukherjee issued a gazette notification which formalised the separation of Telangana from Andhra Pradesh.

=== Summary ===
| Poll event | Date | |
| Poll event | Phase 1 (Telangana) | Phase 2 (Andhra Pradesh) |
|---|---|---|
| Notification date | 2 April 2014 | 12 April 2014 |
| Last date for filing nomination | 9 April 2014 | 19 April 2014 |
| Scrutiny of nomination | 10 April 2014 | 21 April 2014 |
| Last date for withdrawal of nomination | 12 April 2014 | 23 April 2014 |
| Date of poll | 30 April 2014 | 7 May 2014 |
| Date of counting of votes | 16 May 2014 | |
| No. of constituencies | 294 | |

== Parties and alliances ==
The election was the first to be held after the bifurcation of Andhra Pradesh, with the leftist parties contesting separately following differences over the creation of Telangana, which was supported by the Communist Party of India and opposed by the Communist Party of India (Marxist).

In Telangana, the CPI allied with the Indian National Congress while both parties contested separately in Andhra Pradesh. The CPI(M) had an electoral understanding with the YSR Congress Party in assembly constituencies under the Khammam and Mahabubabad parliament constituencies in Telangana, while contesting independently in Andhra Pradesh.

The Telugu Desam Party and the Bharatiya Janata Party contested together as part of the National Democratic Alliance in both states, with the support of the newly formed Janasena Party. The Telangana Rashtra Samithi contested independently in Telangana alone.

Former and last Chief Minister of undivided Andhra Pradesh N. Kiran Kumar Reddy formed the Jai Samaikyandhra Party, advocating the reunification of the state.

=== Telangana ===
| Alliance/Party | | Flag | Symbol | Leader | Seats contested | | | | | |
|---|---|---|---|---|---|---|---|---|---|---|
| Alliance/Party | | Flag | Symbol | Leader | | INC+ | Indian National Congress | Ponnala Lakshmaiah | 112+1 | 118+1 |
| Communist Party of India | | Chada Venkat Reddy | 6+1 | | | INC+ | | | | 118+1 |
| NDA | Telugu Desam Party | | | N. Chandrababu Naidu | 72 | 117 | | | | |
| NDA | Bharatiya Janata Party | | | G. Kishan Reddy | 45 | 117 | | | | |
| Telangana Rashtra Samithi | | | | K. Chandrasekhar Rao | 119 | | | | | |
| YSRCP+ | YSR Congress Party | | | Y. S. Jagan Mohan Reddy | 70+22 | 83+22 | | | | |
| YSRCP+ | Communist Party of India (Marxist) | | | Tammineni Veerabhadram | 13+22 | 83+22 | | | | |
| All India Majlis-e-Ittehadul Muslimeen | | | | Akbaruddin Owaisi | 20 | | | | | |
| Lok Satta Party | | | | Jaya Prakash Narayana | 39 | | | | | |
| Jai Samaikyandhra Party | | | | Kiran Kumar Reddy | 18 | | | | | |

=== Andhra Pradesh ===
| Alliance/Party | | Flag | Symbol | Leader | Seats contested | | | |
|---|---|---|---|---|---|---|---|---|
| Alliance/Party | | Flag | Symbol | Leader | | Indian National Congress | Raghu Veera Reddy | 173 |
| NDA | Telugu Desam Party | | | N. Chandrababu Naidu | 162+3 | 172+3 | | |
| NDA | Bharatiya Janata Party | | | Kambhampati Hari Babu | 10+3 | 172+3 | | |
| YSR Congress Party | | | | Y. S. Jagan Mohan Reddy | 174 | | | |
| Communist Party of India (Marxist) | | | | B. V. Raghavulu | 31 | | | |
| Communist Party of India | | | | K. Ramakrishna | 31 | | | |
| All India Majlis-e-Ittehadul Muslimeen | | | | Akbaruddin Owaisi | 15 | | | |
| Lok Satta Party | | | | Jaya Prakash Narayana | 73 | | | |
| Jai Samaikyandhra Party | | | | Kiran Kumar Reddy | 149 | | | |

== Candidates ==
=== Telangana ===
| District | Constituency | | TRS | | UPA | | NDA | | YSRCP+ | |
| District | No. | Name | Party | Candidate | Party | Candidate | Party | Candidate | Party | Candidate |
|---|---|---|---|---|---|---|---|---|---|---|
| Adilabad | 1 | Sirpur | TRS | Kaveti Sammaiah | INC | Kokkirala Premsagar Rao | TDP | Raavi Srinivas Rao | YSRCP | Shabbir Hussain |
| Adilabad | 2 | Chennur (SC) | TRS | Nallala Odelu | INC | Gaddam Vinod Kumar | BJP | Ram Venu | YSRCP | Mekala Prameela |
| Adilabad | 3 | Bellampalli (SC) | TRS | Durgam Chinnaiah | CPI | Gunda Mallesh | TDP | Pati Subhadra | YSRCP | Erukala Raj Kiran |
| Adilabad | 4 | Mancherial | TRS | Diwakar Rao Nadipelli | INC | Gaddam Aravinda Reddy | BJP | Mulkala Mallareddy | YSRCP | Syed Afzaluddin |
| Adilabad | 5 | Asifabad (ST) | TRS | Kova Laxmi | INC | Atram Sakku | TDP | Marsukola Sarswathi | Did not contest | |
| Adilabad | 6 | Khanapur (ST) | TRS | Ajmeera Rekha | INC | Ajmeera Hari Naik | TDP | Rathod Ritesh | Did not contest | |
| Adilabad | 7 | Adilabad | TRS | Jogu Ramanna | INC | Bhargav Deshpande | BJP | Payal Shankar | YSRCP | Bejjenki Anil Kumar |
| Adilabad | 7 | Adilabad | TRS | Jogu Ramanna | INC | Bhargav Deshpande | BJP | Payal Shankar | CPI(M) | Lanka Raghavulu |
| Adilabad | 8 | Boath (ST) | TRS | Rathod Bapurao | INC | Jadhav Anil Kumar | TDP | Soyam Bapu Rao | YSRCP | Gedam Tulasi Das |
| Adilabad | 9 | Nirmal | TRS | Kuchadi Sriharirao | INC | Alleti Maheshwar Reddy | TDP | Mirza Yaseen Baig | YSRCP | Alluri Mallareddy |
| Adilabad | 10 | Mudhole | TRS | Samudrala Venugopal Chary | INC | Gaddigari Vittal Reddy | BJP | Padakanti Ramadevi | Did not contest | |
| Nizamabad | 11 | Armur | TRS | Asannagari Jeevan Reddy | INC | K. R. Suresh Reddy | TDP | Rajaram Dodolla | Did not contest | |
| Nizamabad | 12 | Bodhan | TRS | Shakil Aamir Mohammed | INC | P. Sudarshan Reddy | TDP | Medapati Prakash Reddy | YSRCP | Katpally Sudeep Reddy |
| Nizamabad | 13 | Jukkal (SC) | TRS | Hanmanth Shinde | INC | S. Gangaram | TDP | Maddela Naveen Kumar | YSRCP | Prakash Naidu |
| Nizamabad | 14 | Banswada | TRS | Pocharam Srinivas Reddy | INC | Balaraju Kasula | TDP | Badya Naik Rathod | YSRCP | Ravutla Sobhana Mahender Goud |
| Nizamabad | 15 | Yellareddy | TRS | Eanugu Ravinder Reddy | INC | Jajala Surender | BJP | Banala Laxma Reddy | YSRCP | Sidhartha Reddy Peddapatlola |
| Nizamabad | 16 | Kamareddy | TRS | Gampa Govardhan | INC | Mohd Ali Shabbir | BJP | Siddaramulu Ettam | YSRCP | Paila Krishna Reddy |
| Nizamabad | 17 | Nizamabad Urban | TRS | Bigala Ganesh | INC | Bomma Mahesh Kumar Goud | BJP | Suryanarayana Dhanpal | YSRCP | Sridhar Reddy Anantha |
| Nizamabad | 18 | Nizamabad Rural | TRS | Bajireddy Goverdhan | INC | Dharmapuri Srinivaas | BJP | Anand Reddy Gaddam | YSRCP | Boddu Ganga Reddy |
| Nizamabad | 19 | Balkonda | TRS | Vemula Prashanth Reddy | INC | Anil Kumar Eravathri | TDP | Aleti Mallikarjun Reddy | YSRCP | Murali Palepu |
| Karimnagar | 20 | Koratla | TRS | Kalvakuntla Vidya Sagar Rao | INC | Ramlu Komireddi | BJP | Surabhi Bhum Rao | YSRCP | Allala Santhosh Reddy |
| Karimnagar | 21 | Jagtial | TRS | M. Sanjay Kumar | INC | T. Jeevan Reddy | TDP | L. Ramana | YSRCP | Katta Sandhya Rani |
| Karimnagar | 22 | Dharmapuri (SC) | TRS | Koppula Eshwar | INC | Adluri Laxman Kumar | BJP | Kannam Anajaiah | YSRCP | Akkenapelli Kumar |
| Karimnagar | 23 | Ramagundam | TRS | Somarapu Satyanarayana | INC | Babar Saleem Pasha | BJP | Gujjula Ramakrishna Reddy | Did not contest | |
| Karimnagar | 24 | Manthani | TRS | Putta Madhukar | INC | D. Sridhar Babu | TDP | Karru Nagaiah | Did not contest | |
| Karimnagar | 25 | Peddapalle | TRS | Dasari Manohar Reddy | INC | T. Bhanu Prasad Rao | TDP | Chinthakunta Vijaya Ramana Rao | YSRCP | M. A. Mustak Pasha |
| Karimnagar | 26 | Karimnagar | TRS | Gangula Kamalakar | INC | C. Lakshmi Narasimha Rao | BJP | Bandi Sanjay Kumar | YSRCP | Dr. K. Nagesh |
| Karimnagar | 27 | Choppadandi (SC) | TRS | Bodiga Shobha | INC | Suddala Devaiah | TDP | Medipally Sathyam | YSRCP | Malyala Prathap |
| Karimnagar | 28 | Vemulawada | TRS | Ramesh Chennamaneni | INC | Bomma Venkateshwar | BJP | Aadi Srinivas | YSRCP | Musku Venkat Reddy |
| Karimnagar | 29 | Sircilla | TRS | K. T. Rama Rao | INC | Konduru Ravinder Rao | BJP | Akula Vijaya | YSRCP | Sridhar Reddy Velumula |
| Karimnagar | 30 | Manakondur (SC) | TRS | Rasamayi Balakishan | INC | Arepalli Mohan | TDP | Kavvampally Satyanarayana | YSRCP | Ajay Varma Sollu |
| Karimnagar | 31 | Huzurabad | TRS | Etela Rajender | INC | Kethiri Sudarshan Reddy | TDP | Kashyap Reddy Muddasani | YSRCP | Sandamalla Naresh |
| Karimnagar | 32 | Husnabad | TRS | Vodithela Sathish Kumar | INC | Aligireddy Praveen Reddy | Did not contest | | YSRCP | Bhasker Reddy Singireddy |
| Medak | 33 | Siddipet | TRS | T. Harish Rao | INC | Taduri Srinivas Goud | BJP | Soppadandi Vidyasagar | YSRCP | Tadka Jagadishwar |
| Medak | 34 | Medak | TRS | Padma Devender Reddy | INC | Vijaya Shanthi | TDP | Batti Jagapathi | YSRCP | Allaram Kristu Dass |
| Medak | 35 | Narayankhed | TRS | Mahareddy Bhupal Reddy | INC | Patlolla Kishta Reddy | TDP | M. Vijaypal Reddy | YSRCP | Apparao Shetkar |
| Medak | 36 | Andole (SC) | TRS | Babu Mohan | INC | Damodar Raja Narasimha | BJP | Burri Yellaiah | YSRCP | Bandargalla Sanjeeva Rao |
| Medak | 37 | Narsapur | TRS | Chilumula Madan Reddy | INC | Vakiti Sunitha Laxma Reddy | BJP | Chaganla Balvindernath | YSRCP | Dandepu Baswanandam |
| Medak | 37 | Narsapur | TRS | Chilumula Madan Reddy | INC | Vakiti Sunitha Laxma Reddy | BJP | Chaganla Balvindernath | CPI(M) | Kandlapally Laxmibai |
| Medak | 38 | Zahirabad (SC) | TRS | Koninty Manik Rao | INC | J. Geeta Reddy | TDP | Y. Narotham | YSRCP | Nalla Surya Prakash |
| Medak | 38 | Zahirabad (SC) | TRS | Koninty Manik Rao | INC | J. Geeta Reddy | TDP | Y. Narotham | CPI(M) | B.Ramchander |
| Medak | 39 | Sangareddy | TRS | Chinta Prabhakar | INC | Jagga Reddy | BJP | K. Sathyanarayana | YSRCP | Gouraiahgari Sreedhar Reddy |
| Medak | 39 | Sangareddy | TRS | Chinta Prabhakar | INC | Jagga Reddy | BJP | K. Sathyanarayana | CPI(M) | B. Mallesham |
| Medak | 40 | Patancheru | TRS | Gudem Mahipal Reddy | INC | T. Nandeshwar Goud | TDP | M. Sapanadev | YSRCP | Gurujala Srinivas Goud |
| Medak | 40 | Patancheru | TRS | Gudem Mahipal Reddy | INC | T. Nandeshwar Goud | TDP | M. Sapanadev | CPI(M) | Mohd Wajid Ali |
| Medak | 41 | Dubbak | TRS | Solipeta Ramalinga Reddy | INC | Cheruku Muthyam Reddy | BJP | Raghunandan Rao | YSRCP | Marapadaga Sravan Kumar |
| Medak | 42 | Gajwel | TRS | Kalvakuntla Chandrashekar Rao | INC | Tumkunta Narsa Reddy | TDP | Pratap Reddy Vanteru | YSRCP | Donthi Purshotham Reddy |
| Ranga Reddy | 43 | Medchal | TRS | Malipedhi Sudheer Reddy | INC | Kichannagari Laxma Reddy | TDP | Thotakura Jangaiah Yadav | CPI(M) | Chinthala Yadaiah |
| Ranga Reddy | 44 | Malkajgiri | TRS | C. Kanaka Reddy | INC | Nandhikanti Sridhar | BJP | N. Ramchander Rao | YSRCP | G. Surya Narayana Reddy |
| Ranga Reddy | 44 | Malkajgiri | TRS | C. Kanaka Reddy | INC | Nandhikanti Sridhar | BJP | N. Ramchander Rao | CPI(M) | D. G. Narshima Rao |
| Ranga Reddy | 45 | Quthbullapur | TRS | K. Hanmanth Reddy | INC | Kuna Srisailam Goud | TDP | K.P. Vivekanand | YSRCP | Kolan Srinivas Reddy |
| Ranga Reddy | 46 | Kukatpally | TRS | G. Padma Rao | INC | M. Narsimha Yadav | TDP | Madhavaram Krishna Rao | YSRCP | Jampana Pratap |
| Ranga Reddy | 47 | Uppal | TRS | Bethi Subhas Reddy | INC | Bandari Lakshma Reddy | BJP | N. V. S. S. Prabhakar | YSRCP | Ampala Padma Reddy |
| Ranga Reddy | 47 | Uppal | TRS | Bethi Subhas Reddy | INC | Bandari Lakshma Reddy | BJP | N. V. S. S. Prabhakar | CPI(M) | S. Narsimha Reddy |
| Ranga Reddy | 48 | Ibrahimpatnam | TRS | Kancharla Chandrashekar Reddy | INC | Kyama Mallesha | TDP | Manchireddy Kishan Reddy | YSRCP | E. C. Shekhar Goud |
| Ranga Reddy | 48 | Ibrahimpatnam | TRS | Kancharla Chandrashekar Reddy | INC | Kyama Mallesha | TDP | Manchireddy Kishan Reddy | CPI(M) | Pagadala Yadaiah |
| Ranga Reddy | 49 | Lal Bahadur Nagar | TRS | Muddagowni Ram Mohan Goud | INC | Devireddy Sudheer Reddy | TDP | Ryaga Krishnaiah | YSRCP | Putha Pratap Reddy |
| Ranga Reddy | 50 | Maheshwaram | TRS | Kotha Manohar Reddy | INC | Malreddy Ranga Reddy (Note: Friendly contest between INC and CPI in AC 50 Maheshwaram) | TDP | Teegala Krishna Reddy | CPI(M) | Dubbaka Ramchandraiah |
| Ranga Reddy | 50 | Maheshwaram | TRS | Kotha Manohar Reddy | CPI | Syed Azeez Pasha | TDP | Teegala Krishna Reddy | CPI(M) | Dubbaka Ramchandraiah |
| Ranga Reddy | 51 | Rajendranagar | TRS | A. Swarnalatha | INC | Gnaneshwar | TDP | T. Prakash Goud | YSRCP | Mujataba Ahmed Syed |
| Ranga Reddy | 52 | Serilingampally | TRS | Komaragoni Shanker Goud | INC | M. Bhikshapathi Yadav | TDP | Arekapudi Gandhi | YSRCP | Mukka Rupananda Reddy |
| Ranga Reddy | 53 | Chevella (SC) | TRS | Korani Sayanna Ratnam | INC | Kale Yadaiah | TDP | Mekala Venkatesh | YSRCP | Korani Dayanand |
| Ranga Reddy | 54 | Pargi | TRS | Koppula Harishwar Reddy | INC | T. Ram Mohan Reddy | BJP | Kamatham Ram Reddy | YSRCP | Karavelly Rukma Reddy |
| Ranga Reddy | 55 | Vikarabad (SC) | TRS | B. Sanjeeva Rao | INC | Gaddam Prasad Kumar | BJP | Pushpa Leela Kondru | YSRCP | Kranthi Kumar Chintala |
| Ranga Reddy | 56 | Tandur | TRS | P. Mahender Reddy | INC | Malkud Narayan Rao | TDP | M. Naresh | YSRCP | M. Prabhu Kumar |
| Hyderabad | 57 | Musheerabad | TRS | Muta Gopal | INC | P. Vinay Kumar | BJP | K. Laxman | YSRCP | Gade Bal Reddy |
| Hyderabad | 57 | Musheerabad | TRS | Muta Gopal | INC | P. Vinay Kumar | BJP | K. Laxman | CPI(M) | M. Srinivas |
| Hyderabad | 58 | Malakpet | TRS | C. Satish Kumar | INC | V. N. Reddy | BJP | B. Venkat Reddy | YSRCP | Hari Krishna Goud Lingala |
| Hyderabad | 59 | Amberpet | TRS | Aedla Sudhakar Reddy | INC | V. Hanumanta Rao | BJP | G. Kishan Reddy | YSRCP | Mohammed |
| Hyderabad | 59 | Amberpet | TRS | Aedla Sudhakar Reddy | INC | V. Hanumanta Rao | BJP | G. Kishan Reddy | CPI(M) | M. Mahender |
| Hyderabad | 60 | Khairatabad | TRS | Manne Govardhan Reddy | INC | Danam Nagender | BJP | Chintala Rama Chandra Reddy | YSRCP | P. Vijaya Reddy |
| Hyderabad | 61 | Jubilee Hills | TRS | G. Raja Mouli | INC | P Vishnuvardhan Reddy | TDP | Maganti Gopinath | YSRCP | Kotim Reddy Vinay Reddy |
| Hyderabad | 62 | Sanath Nagar | TRS | Dande Vithal | INC | Marri Shashidhar Reddy | TDP | Talasani Srinivas Yadav | YSRCP | Vellala Ram Mohan |
| Hyderabad | 63 | Nampalli | TRS | K. Hanmantha Rao | INC | E. Vinod Kumar | TDP | Mohammed Feroz Khan | YSRCP | Shahzoor Ali Siddiqui |
| Hyderabad | 64 | Karwan | TRS | T. Jeevan Singh | INC | T. Roop Singh | BJP | Baddam Bal Reddy | YSRCP | Balakar Srikanthlal |
| Hyderabad | 64 | Karwan | TRS | T. Jeevan Singh | INC | T. Roop Singh | BJP | Baddam Bal Reddy | CPI(M) | Guttamedi Vittalaiah |
| Hyderabad | 65 | Goshamahal | TRS | Prem Kumar Dhoot | INC | Mukesh Goud | BJP | T. Raja Singh | YSRCP | Raghavendra Mettu |
| Hyderabad | 66 | Charminar | TRS | Mir Inayath Ali Baqri | INC | K. Venkatesh | TDP | M. A. Basith | YSRCP | T. Srinivasa Rao |
| Hyderabad | 67 | Chandrayangutta | TRS | Muppidi Seetharam Reddy | INC | B. R. Sadanand | TDP | M. Prakash Mudiraj | Did not contest | |
| Hyderabad | 68 | Yakutpura | TRS | Shabbir Ahmed | INC | Ashwin Reddy Mainampati | BJP | Ch. Roop Raj | Did not contest | |
| Hyderabad | 69 | Bahadurpura | TRS | Mohd Ziauddin | INC | Syed Abdul Sami | TDP | Md. Abdul Rahman | YSRCP | M. Rameshwari Shyamala |
| Hyderabad | 70 | Secunderabad | TRS | T. Padma Rao | INC | Jayasudha Kapoor | TDP | Kuna Venkatesh Goud | YSRCP | Adam Vijay Kumar |
| Hyderabad | 71 | Secunderabad Cantt. (SC) | TRS | Gajjela Nagesh | INC | Gajjela Kantham | TDP | G. Sayanna | YSRCP | P. Venkat Rao |
| Mahbubnagar | 72 | Kodangal | TRS | Gurunath Reddy | INC | D. Vittal Rao | TDP | Anumula Revanth Reddy | Did not contest | |
| Mahbubnagar | 73 | Narayanpet | TRS | K. Shivakumar Reddy | INC | Krishna Vamangiri | TDP | S. Rajender Reddy | YSRCP | Pesala Jayadeva Reddy |
| Mahbubnagar | 74 | Mahbubnagar | TRS | V. Srinivas Goud | INC | Md. Obedulla Kothwal | BJP | Yennam Srinivas Reddy | YSRCP | Bekkari Srinivas Reddy |
| Mahbubnagar | 75 | Jadcherla | TRS | C. Laxma Reddy | INC | Mallu Ravi | TDP | Chandra Shekar Marati | YSRCP | M. Pandu Naik |
| Mahbubnagar | 76 | Devarkadra | TRS | Alla Venkateshwar Reddy | INC | Pavan Kumar | TDP | Seethamma | Did not contest | |
| Mahbubnagar | 77 | Makthal | TRS | Yelkoti Yella Reddy | INC | Chittem Ram Mohan Reddy | TDP | Kothakotta Dhayaakkar Reddy | YSRCP | Varakatam Jagannath Reddy |
| Mahbubnagar | 78 | Wanaparthy | TRS | Singireddy Niranjan Reddy | INC | G. Chinna Reddy | TDP | Chandra Sekhar Reddy Ravula | YSRCP | R. Ravi Prakash |
| Mahbubnagar | 79 | Gadwal | TRS | Bandla Krishna Mohan Reddy | INC | D. K. Aruna | BJP | V. L. Keshav Reddy | Did not contest | |
| Mahbubnagar | 80 | Alampur (SC) | TRS | Manda Sreenath | INC | S. A. Sampath Kumar | TDP | V. M. Abraham | YSRCP | Bangi Laxmanna |
| Mahbubnagar | 81 | Nagarkurnool | TRS | Marri Janardhan Reddy | INC | Kuchakulla Damodar Reddy | BJP | Nagam Shashidhar Reddy | YSRCP | Srinivas Reddy |
| Mahbubnagar | 82 | Achampet (SC) | TRS | Guvvala Balaraju | INC | Chikkudu Vamshi Krishna | TDP | Pothuganti Ramulu | YSRCP | B. Ravinder |
| Mahbubnagar | 82 | Achampet (SC) | TRS | Guvvala Balaraju | INC | Chikkudu Vamshi Krishna | TDP | Pothuganti Ramulu | CPI(M) | Chintha Anjaneyulu |
| Mahbubnagar | 83 | Kalwakurthy | TRS | Gurka Jaipal Yadav | INC | Challa Vamshichand Reddy | BJP | Achary Talloju | YSRCP | Yadma Kista Reddy |
| Mahbubnagar | 84 | Shadnagar | TRS | Yelganamoni Anjaiah Yadav | INC | Chowlapally Pratap Reddy | BJP | Sreevardan Reddy Nelli | YSRCP | Bobbili Sudhakar Reddy |
| Mahbubnagar | 85 | Kollapur | TRS | Jupally Krishna Rao | INC | Beeram Harshavardhan Reddy | BJP | Katikaneni Madhusudhan Rao | CPI(M) | M. D. Jabbar |
| Nalgonda | 86 | Devarakond (ST) | TRS | Kethavath Lalu | CPI | Ravindra Kumar Ramavath | TDP | Bheelya Naik Kethavath | YSRCP | J. Nageswar Rao |
| Nalgonda | 86 | Devarakond (ST) | TRS | Kethavath Lalu | CPI | Ravindra Kumar Ramavath | TDP | Bheelya Naik Kethavath | CPI(M) | Dheeravath Ravi |
| Nalgonda | 87 | Nagarjuna Sagar | TRS | Nomula Narsimhaiah Yadav | INC | Kunduru Jana Reddy | TDP | Kadari Anjaiah Yadav | YSRCP | Mallu Ravindar Reddy |
| Nalgonda | 87 | Nagarjuna Sagar | TRS | Nomula Narsimhaiah Yadav | INC | Kunduru Jana Reddy | TDP | Kadari Anjaiah Yadav | CPI(M) | Kunreddy Nagireddy |
| Nalgonda | 88 | Miryalguda | TRS | Alugubelli Amarender Reddy | INC | Nallamothu Bhaskar Rao | TDP | Bantu Venkateshwarlu | CPI(M) | Julakanti Ranga Reddy |
| Nalgonda | 89 | Huzurnagar | TRS | Kasoju Shankaramma | INC | N. Uttam Kumar Reddy | TDP | Swamy Goud Vangala | YSRCP | Gattu Srikanth Reddy |
| Nalgonda | 89 | Huzurnagar | TRS | Kasoju Shankaramma | INC | N. Uttam Kumar Reddy | TDP | Swamy Goud Vangala | CPI(M) | Parepally Shekar Rao |
| Nalgonda | 90 | Kodad | TRS | Kanmantha Reddy Shashidhar Reddy | INC | N. Padmavathi Reddy | TDP | Bollam Mallaiah Yadav | YSRCP | Yerneni Venkata Rathnam Babu |
| Nalgonda | 90 | Kodad | TRS | Kanmantha Reddy Shashidhar Reddy | INC | N. Padmavathi Reddy | TDP | Bollam Mallaiah Yadav | CPI(M) | Juttukonda Basavaiah |
| Nalgonda | 91 | Suryapet | TRS | Guntakandla Jagadish Reddy | INC | Ramreddy Damodar Reddy | TDP | Patel Ramesh Reddy | YSRCP | Beeravolu Somi Reddy |
| Nalgonda | 92 | Nalgonda | TRS | Dubbaka Narsimha Reddy | INC | Komatireddy Venkat Reddy | BJP | Kuthuru Srinivas Reddy | CPI(M) | Syed Hasham |
| Nalgonda | 93 | Munugode | TRS | Koosukuntla Prabhakar Reddy | CPI | Palla Venkata Reddy | BJP | Gangidi Manohar Reddy | YSRCP | Mudireddy Gavaskar Reddy |
| Nalgonda | 93 | Munugode | TRS | Koosukuntla Prabhakar Reddy | CPI | Palla Venkata Reddy | BJP | Gangidi Manohar Reddy | CPI(M) | Surkanti Srinivas Reddy |
| Nalgonda | 94 | Bhongir | TRS | Pailla Shekar Reddy | INC | Pothamshetty Venkateshwarulu | TDP | Uma Madhava Reddy | CPI(M) | Thummala Veera Reddy |
| Nalgonda | 95 | Nakrekal (SC) | TRS | Vemula Veeresham | INC | Chirumarthi Lingaiah | BJP | Cheruku Laxmi | YSRCP | Nakerakanti Swamy |
| Nalgonda | 95 | Nakrekal (SC) | TRS | Vemula Veeresham | INC | Chirumarthi Lingaiah | BJP | Cheruku Laxmi | CPI(M) | Mamidi Sarvaiah |
| Nalgonda | 96 | Thungathurthy (SC) | TRS | Gadari Kishore | INC | Addanki Dayakar | TDP | Palvai Rajani Kumari | YSRCP | Erugu Venkateshwarlu |
| Nalgonda | 96 | Thungathurthy (SC) | TRS | Gadari Kishore | INC | Addanki Dayakar | TDP | Palvai Rajani Kumari | CPI(M) | Mulkalapally Ramulu |
| Nalgonda | 97 | Alair | TRS | Gongidi Sunitha | INC | Budida Bikshamaiah Goud | BJP | Dr. Kasam Venkateshwarlu | CPI(M) | Gavala Rama Swamy |
| Warangal | 98 | Jangoan | TRS | Muthireddy Yadagiri Reddy | INC | Ponnala Lakshmaiah | BJP | Pratap Reddy Kommuri | YSRCP | Shankara Chary Vajroju |
| Warangal | 98 | Jangoan | TRS | Muthireddy Yadagiri Reddy | INC | Ponnala Lakshmaiah | BJP | Pratap Reddy Kommuri | CPI(M) | Amudala Malla Reddy |
| Warangal | 99 | Ghanpur Station (SC) | TRS | Thatikonda Rajaiah | INC | Gunde Vijaya Rama Rao | TDP | Dommati Sambaiah | YSRCP | Munigala William |
| Warangal | 100 | Palakurthi | TRS | N. Sudhakar Rao | INC | Dugyala Shrinivas Rao | TDP | Errabelli Dayakar Rao | Did not contest | |
| Warangal | 101 | Dornakal (ST) | TRS | Sathyavathi Rathod | INC | Dharamsoth Redya Naik | TDP | Dr. Jatoth Ramachandru Naik | YSRCP | Banoth Sujatha |
| Warangal | 101 | Dornakal (ST) | TRS | Sathyavathi Rathod | INC | Dharamsoth Redya Naik | TDP | Dr. Jatoth Ramachandru Naik | CPI(M) | Angoth Venkanna Naik |
| Warangal | 102 | Mahabubabad (ST) | TRS | Banoth Shankar Nayak | INC | Kavitha Maloth | TDP | Balu Chowan Moodu | CPI(M) | Banoth Seetharam Naik |
| Warangal | 103 | Narsampet | TRS | Peddi Sudarshan Reddy | INC | Katthi Venkataswamy | TDP | Revuri Prakash Reddy | CPI(M) | Gade Prabhakar Reddy |
| Warangal | 104 | Parkal | TRS | Sahoder Reddy Muddasani | INC | Engala Venkatram Reddy | TDP | Challa Dharma Reddy | Did not contest | |
| Warangal | 105 | Warangal West | TRS | Dasyam Vinay Bhasker | INC | Swarna Errabelli | BJP | Dharmarao Marthineni | YSRCP | Bheemreddy Sudheer Reddy |
| Warangal | 106 | Warangal East | TRS | Konda Surekha | INC | Basavaraju Saraiah | BJP | Padma Rao | CPI(M) | Mettu Srinivas |
| Warangal | 107 | Wardhanapet (SC) | TRS | Aroori Ramesh | INC | Kondeti Shridhar | Did not contest | | YSRCP | Bojjapalli Rajaiah |
| Warangal | 108 | Bhupalpalle | TRS | S. Madhusudhana Chary | INC | Gandra Venkata Ramana Reddy | BJP | Gandra Satyanarayana Rao | Did not contest | |
| Warangal | 109 | Mulug (ST) | TRS | Azmeera Chandulal | INC | Podem Veeraiah | TDP | Seethakka | YSRCP | Lokini Sampathi |
| Warangal | 109 | Mulug (ST) | TRS | Azmeera Chandulal | INC | Podem Veeraiah | TDP | Seethakka | CPI(M) | Digini Sammaiah |
| Khammam | 110 | Pinapaka (ST) | TRS | Dr. N. Shankar | CPI | Tholem Ramesh | BJP | Chanda Lingaiah Dora | YSRCP | Payam Venkateswarlu |
| Khammam | 111 | Yellandu (ST) | TRS | Abbaiah Vooke | INC | Koram Kanakaiah | TDP | Haripriya Banoth | YSRCP | Gugulothu Ravi Babu |
| Khammam | 112 | Khammam | TRS | Gundala Krishna | INC | Puvvada Ajay Kumar | TDP | Thummala Nageswara Rao | YSRCP | Kurakula Nagabhushaiah |
| Khammam | 113 | Palair | TRS | Ravella Ravindra | INC | Ramreddy Venkat Reddy | TDP | Maddineni Baby Swarna Kumari | CPI(M) | Pothineni Sudarshan Rao |
| Khammam | 114 | Madhira (SC) | TRS | Bommera Ramamurthy | INC | Mallu Bhatti Vikramarka | TDP | Motkupalli Narasimhulu | CPI(M) | Lingala Kamal Raju |
| Khammam | 115 | Wyra (ST) | TRS | Banoth Chandravathi | CPI | Narayana Moodu | TDP | Banoth Balaji | YSRCP | Banoth Madanlal |
| Khammam | 116 | Sathupalli (SC) | TRS | Pidamarthy Ravi | INC | Sambani Chandrashekar | TDP | Sandra Venkata Veeraiah | YSRCP | Matta Dayanand Vijay Kumar |
| Khammam | 117 | Kothagudem | TRS | Jalagam Venkat Rao | CPI | Kunamneni Sambasiva Rao | TDP | Koneru Satyanarayana | YSRCP | Vanama Venkateshwara Rao |
| Khammam | 118 | Aswaraopeta (ST) | TRS | Jare Adinarayana | INC | Mitrasena Vageela | TDP | Mecha Nageswara Rao | YSRCP | Thati Venkateswarlu |
| Khammam | 119 | Bhadrachalam (ST) | TRS | Mane Ramakrishna | INC | Kunja Satyavathi | TDP | K. P. R. K. Phaneeswaramma | CPI(M) | Sunnam Rajaiah |

=== Andhra Pradesh ===
| District | Constituency | | NDA | | YSRCP | | UPA | |
| District | No. | Name | Party | Candidate | Party | Candidate | Party | Candidate |
|---|---|---|---|---|---|---|---|---|
| Srikakulam | 120 | Ichchapuram | TDP | Ashok Bendalam | YSRCP | Narthu Ramarao | INC | Agarwal Naresh (Lallu) |
| Srikakulam | 121 | Palasa | TDP | Gouthu Syam Sunder Sivaji | YSRCP | Vajja Babu Rao | INC | Nageswara Rao Vanka |
| Srikakulam | 122 | Tekkali | TDP | Kinjarapu Atchannaidu | YSRCP | Duvvada Srinivas | INC | Killi Rammohana Rao |
| Srikakulam | 123 | Pathapatnam | TDP | Satrucharla Vijaya Rama Raju | YSRCP | Kalamata Venkata Ramana Murthy | INC | Palavalasa Karunakara Rao |
| Srikakulam | 124 | Srikakulam | TDP | Gunda Lakshmi Devi | YSRCP | Dharmana Prasada Rao | INC | Chowdari Satish |
| Srikakulam | 125 | Amadalavalasa | TDP | Koona Ravi Kumar | YSRCP | Thammineni Seetharam | INC | Boddepalli Satyavathi |
| Srikakulam | 126 | Etcherla | TDP | Kimidi Kalavenkata Rao | YSRCP | Gorle Kiran Kumar | INC | Ravikiran Kilari |
| Srikakulam | 127 | Narasannapeta | TDP | Baggu Ramanamurthy | YSRCP | Dharmana Krishna Das | INC | Jagan Mohana Rao Dola |
| Srikakulam | 128 | Rajam (SC) | TDP | K. Prathibha Bharathi | YSRCP | Kambala Jogulu | INC | Kondru Murali Mohan |
| Srikakulam | 129 | Palakonda (ST) | TDP | Nimmaka Jaya Krishna | YSRCP | Viswasarayi Kalavathi | INC | Nimmaka Sugreevulu |
| Vizianagaram | 130 | Kurupam (ST) | TDP | Janardhan Thatraj Veera Vara Todramala | YSRCP | Pamula Pushpa Sreevani | INC | Erramilli Indrasena Vardhan |
| Vizianagaram | 131 | Parvathipuram (SC) | TDP | Bobbili Chiranjeevulu | YSRCP | Jammana Prasanna Kumar | INC | Alajangi Jogarao |
| Vizianagaram | 132 | Salur (ST) | TDP | Rajendra Pratap Bhanj Deo | YSRCP | Peedika Rajanna Dora | INC | Andra Baba |
| Vizianagaram | 133 | Bobbili | TDP | Thentu Lakshmu Naidu | YSRCP | R. V. Sujay Krishna Ranga Rao | INC | S. V. China Appala Naidu |
| Vizianagaram | 134 | Cheepurupalle | TDP | Kimidi Mrunalini | YSRCP | Bellana Chandra Sekhar | INC | Botsa Satyanarayana |
| Vizianagaram | 135 | Gajapathinagaram | TDP | Kondapalli Appala Naidu | YSRCP | Kadubandi Srinivasa Rao | INC | Botcha Appalanarasayya |
| Vizianagaram | 136 | Nellimarla | TDP | Pathivada Narayanaswamy Naidu | YSRCP | P. V. V. Suryanarayana Raju | INC | Baddukonda Appala Naidu |
| Vizianagaram | 137 | Vizianagaram | TDP | Geetha Meesala | YSRCP | Kolagatla Veerabhadra Swamy | INC | Yedla Ramanamurthy |
| Vizianagaram | 138 | Srungavarapukota | TDP | Kolla Lalitha Kumari | YSRCP | Rongali Jagannadham | INC | Indukuri Raghu Raju |
| Visakhapatnam | 139 | Bhimli | TDP | Ganta Srinivasa Rao | YSRCP | Karri Sita Ramu | INC | Chenna Das |
| Visakhapatnam | 140 | Visakhapatnam East | TDP | Velagapudi Ramakrishna Babu | YSRCP | Vamsi Krishna Srinivas | INC | Prabha Goud Doddi |
| Visakhapatnam | 141 | Visakhapatnam South | TDP | Vasupalli Ganesh Kumar | YSRCP | Kola Guruvulu | INC | Dronamraju Srinivasa Rao |
| Visakhapatnam | 142 | Visakhapatnam North | BJP | Penmetsa Vishnu Kumar Raju | YSRCP | Chokkakula Venkata Rao | INC | Bharathi Venkateswari Gunturu |
| Visakhapatnam | 143 | Visakhapatnam West | TDP | P. G. V. R. Naidu | YSRCP | Dadi Ratnakar | INC | Pedada Ramani Kumari |
| Visakhapatnam | 144 | Gajuwaka | TDP | Palla Srinivasa Rao | YSRCP | Tippala Nagireddy | INC | Y. V. Sudhakar Naidu (GV) |
| Visakhapatnam | 145 | Chodavaram | TDP | Kalidindi Suryana Naga Sanyasi Raju | YSRCP | Karanam Dharmasri | INC | Atchuta Rao Gunuru |
| Visakhapatnam | 146 | V. Madugula | TDP | Gavireddi Ramanaidu | YSRCP | Budi Mutyala Naidu | INC | Naryana Murty Kuracha |
| Visakhapatnam | 147 | Araku Valley (ST) | TDP | Siveri Soma | YSRCP | Kidari Sarveswara Rao | INC | Mattam Malleswara Padal |
| Visakhapatnam | 148 | Paderu (ST) | BJP | Lokula Gandhi | YSRCP | Giddi Eswari | INC | Pasupuleti Balaraju |
| Visakhapatnam | 149 | Anakapalli | TDP | Peela Govinda Satyanarayana | YSRCP | Konathala Raghunath | INC | Danthuluri Dilip Kumar |
| Visakhapatnam | 150 | Pendurthi | TDP | Bandaru Satyanarayana Murthy | YSRCP | Gandi Babji | INC | Mummana Demudu |
| Visakhapatnam | 151 | Elamanchili | TDP | Panchakarla Ramesh Babu | YSRCP | Pragada Nageswara Rao | INC | Dubasi Nagendra Kumar |
| Visakhapatnam | 152 | Payakaraopeta (SC) | TDP | Vangalapudi Anitha | YSRCP | Changala Venkata Rao | INC | Yella Krishna Murthy |
| Visakhapatnam | 153 | Narsipatnam | TDP | Chintakayala Ayyanna Patrudu | YSRCP | Petla Uma Sankara Ganesh | Did not contest | |
| East Godavari | 154 | Tuni | TDP | Yanamala Rama Krishnudu | YSRCP | Dadisetti Ramalingeswara Rao | INC | Chilukoti Panduranga Rao |
| East Godavari | 155 | Prathipadu (East Godavari) | TDP | Parvatha Sri Satyanarayanamurthy | YSRCP | Varupula Subbarao | INC | Parvatha Purnachandra Prasad |
| East Godavari | 156 | Pithapuram | TDP | Pothula Venkata Viswam | YSRCP | Pendem Dorababu | INC | Indira Pantham |
| East Godavari | 157 | Kakinada Rural | TDP | Pilli Ananta Lakshmi | YSRCP | Chelluboyina Venugopala Krishna | INC | Palacholla Venkata Sita Rama Swamy Naidu |
| East Godavari | 158 | Peddapuram | TDP | Nimmakayala Chinarajappa | YSRCP | Thota Subbarao Naidu | INC | Tummala Dorababu |
| East Godavari | 159 | Anaparthy | TDP | Nallamilli Ramakrishna Reddy | YSRCP | Sathi Suryanarayana Reddy | INC | Addanki Mukteswara Rao |
| East Godavari | 160 | Kakinada City | TDP | Vanamadi Venkateswara Rao | YSRCP | Dwarampudi Chandrasekhar Reddy | INC | Pantham Venkateswara Rao |
| East Godavari | 161 | Ramachandrapuram | TDP | Thota Trimurthulu | YSRCP | Pilli Subhash Chandra Bose | INC | J. V. Nanda |
| East Godavari | 162 | Mummidivaram | TDP | Datla Subbaraju | YSRCP | Guthula Venkata Sai Srinivasa Rao | INC | Gangireddy Trinadha Rao |
| East Godavari | 163 | Amalapuram (SC) | TDP | Aithabathula Ananda Rao | YSRCP | Golla Babu Rao | INC | Janga Gowtham |
| East Godavari | 164 | Razole (SC) | TDP | Gollapalli Surya Rao | YSRCP | Bonthu Rajeswara Rao | INC | Vijaya Prasad Sarella |
| East Godavari | 165 | Gannavaram (East Godavari) (SC) | TDP | Pulaparty Narayana Murty | YSRCP | Kondeti Chittibabu | INC | Pamula Rajeswari Devi |
| East Godavari | 166 | Kothapeta | TDP | Bandaru Satyananda Rao | YSRCP | Chirla Jaggi Reddy | INC | Akula Rama Krishna |
| East Godavari | 167 | Mandapeta | TDP | V. Jogeswara Rao | YSRCP | Girajala Venkata Swamy Naidu | INC | Kamana Prabhakara Rao |
| East Godavari | 168 | Rajanagaram | TDP | Pendurthi Venkatesh | YSRCP | Jakkampudi Vijaya Lakshmi | INC | Ankam Nageswara Rao (Gopi) |
| East Godavari | 169 | Rajahmundry City | BJP | Akula Satyanarayana | YSRCP | Bommana Raj Kumar | INC | Gangadhara Rao Vasamsetty |
| East Godavari | 170 | Rajamundry Rural | TDP | Gorantla Butchaiah Chowdary | YSRCP | Akula Veerraju | INC | Rayudu Rajavalli |
| East Godavari | 171 | Jaggampeta | TDP | Jyothula Chantibabu | YSRCP | Jyothula Nehru | INC | Thota Ravi (Suryanarayana Murthy) |
| East Godavari | 172 | Rampachodavaram (ST) | TDP | Seethamsetti Venkateswara Rao | YSRCP | Vanthala Rajeswari | INC | Kosuri Kasi Viswanadha |
| West Godavari | 173 | Kovvur (SC) | TDP | K. S. Jawahar | YSRCP | Taneti Vanitha | INC | Gummadi Samarpana Rao |
| West Godavari | 174 | Nidadavole | TDP | Burugupalli Sesharao | YSRCP | S. Rajiv Krishna | INC | Kamisetty Venkata Satyanarayana |
| West Godavari | 175 | Achanta | TDP | Pithani Satyanarayana | YSRCP | Mudunuri Prasada Raju | INC | Indugapalli Ramanuja Rao |
| West Godavari | 176 | Palacole | TDP | Nimmala Rama Naidu | YSRCP | Meka Seshu Babu | INC | Karimeraka Bala Nageswara Rao |
| West Godavari | 177 | Narasapuram | TDP | Bandaru Madhava Naidu | YSRCP | Kothapalli Subbarayudu | INC | Kalavakolanu Tulasi |
| West Godavari | 178 | Bhimavaram | TDP | Pulaparthi Ramanjaneyulu | YSRCP | Grandhi Srinivas | INC | Yarlagadda Ramu (Chapala Ramu) |
| West Godavari | 179 | Undi | TDP | V. V. Siva Rama Raju | YSRCP | Pathapati Sarraju | INC | Gadiraju Latchiraju |
| West Godavari | 180 | Tanuku | TDP | Arimilli Radha Krishna | YSRCP | Cheerla Radha Krishna | INC | Bokka Bhaskara Rao |
| West Godavari | 181 | Tadepalligudem | BJP | Pydikondala Manikyala Rao | YSRCP | Thota Poorna Gopala Satyanarayana | INC | Devati Padmavathi |
| West Godavari | 182 | Unguturu | TDP | Ganni Veeranjaneyulu | YSRCP | Puppala Srinivasa Rao | INC | Kolli Appa Rao |
| West Godavari | 183 | Denduluru | TDP | Chintamaneni Prabhakar | YSRCP | Karumuri Venkata Nageswara Rao | INC | Maganti Veerendra Prasadu (Babbu) |
| West Godavari | 184 | Eluru | TDP | Badeti Bujji | YSRCP | Alla Nani | INC | A. V. S Raju |
| West Godavari | 185 | Gopalapuram (SC) | TDP | Muppidi Venkateswara Rao | YSRCP | Talari Venkat Rao | INC | Khandavalli Krishnaveni |
| West Godavari | 186 | Polavaram (ST) | TDP | Modiyam Srinivasa Rao | YSRCP | Tellam Balaraju | INC | Kangala Posiratnam |
| West Godavari | 187 | Chintalapudi (SC) | TDP | Peethala Sujatha | YSRCP | Burla Devi Priya | INC | Yadlapalli Raja Rao |
| Krishna | 188 | Tiruvuru (SC) | TDP | Nallagatla Swamy Das | YSRCP | Kokkiligadda Rakshana Nidhi | INC | Parasa Rajiv Rathan |
| Krishna | 189 | Nuzvid | TDP | Muddaraboina Venkateswara Rao | YSRCP | Meka Venkata Pratap Apparao | INC | Chinnam Rama Kotaiah |
| Krishna | 190 | Gannavaram (Krishna) | TDP | Vallabhaneni Vamsi Mohan | YSRCP | Dutta Ramachandrarao | INC | Padmasri Sunkara |
| Krishna | 191 | Gudivada | TDP | Raavi Venkateswara Rao | YSRCP | Kodali Nani | INC | Atluri Subbarao |
| Krishna | 192 | Kaikalur | BJP | Kamineni Srinivas | YSRCP | Uppala Ram Prasad | INC | Naraharasetti Narasimha Rao |
| Krishna | 193 | Pedana | TDP | Kagitha Venkata Rao | YSRCP | Buragadda Vedavyas | INC | Pinnenti Visweswara Rao |
| Krishna | 194 | Machilipatnam | TDP | Kollu Ravindra | YSRCP | Perni Nani | INC | Chalamalasetty Adi Kiran |
| Krishna | 195 | Avanigadda | TDP | Mandali Buddha Prasad | YSRCP | Simhadri Ramesh Babu | INC | Mathi Venkateswara Rao |
| Krishna | 196 | Pamarru (SC) | TDP | Varla Ramaiah | YSRCP | Uppuleti Kalpana | INC | D. Y. Das |
| Krishna | 197 | Penamaluru | TDP | Bode Prasad | YSRCP | Kukkala Vidyasagar | INC | Nerella Venkata Phani Pavan Sobhan Babu |
| Krishna | 198 | Vijaywada West | BJP | Vellampalli Srinivas | YSRCP | Jaleel Khan | INC | Akula Srinivas Kumar |
| Krishna | 199 | Vijayawada Central | TDP | Bonda Umamaheswara Rao | YSRCP | Punuru Gowtham Reddy | INC | Malladi Vishnu |
| Krishna | 200 | Vijayawada East | TDP | Gadde Rama Mohan | YSRCP | Vangaveeti Radha Krishna | INC | Devineni Nehru |
| Krishna | 201 | Mylavaram | TDP | Devineni Uma Maheswara Rao | YSRCP | Jogi Ramesh | INC | Appasani Sandeep |
| Krishna | 202 | Nandigama (SC) | TDP | Tangirala Prabhakara Rao | YSRCP | Monditoka Jagan Mohan Rao | INC | Velpula Parameswara Rao |
| Krishna | 203 | Jaggayyapeta | TDP | Rajagopal Sreeram | YSRCP | Samineni Udayabhanu | INC | Vemula Nageswararao |
| Guntur | 204 | Pedakurapadu | TDP | Kommalapati Sridhar | YSRCP | Bolla Brahma Naidu | INC | Pakkala Suribabu |
| Guntur | 205 | Tadikonda (SC) | TDP | Tenali Sravan Kumar | YSRCP | Heni Christina Kathera | INC | Challagali Kishore Kumar |
| Guntur | 206 | Mangalagiri | TDP | Ganji Chiranjeevi | YSRCP | Alla Ramakrishna Reddy | INC | M. Ramakrishna Reddy |
| Guntur | 207 | Ponnur | TDP | Dhulipalla Narendra Kumar | YSRCP | Ravi Venkata Ramana | INC | Talla Venkatesh Yadav |
| Guntur | 208 | Vemuru (SC) | TDP | Nakka Ananda Babu | YSRCP | Merugu Nagarjuna | INC | Revendla Bharat Babu |
| Guntur | 209 | Repalle | TDP | Anagani Satya Prasad | YSRCP | Mopidevi Venkata Ramana Rao | INC | Mopidevi Srinivasa Rao |
| Guntur | 210 | Tenali | TDP | Alapati Rajendra Prasad | YSRCP | Annabathuni Siva Kumar | INC | Nadendla Manohar |
| Guntur | 211 | Bapatla | TDP | Annam Satish Prabhakar | YSRCP | Kona Raghupathi | INC | Chejerla Narayana Reddy |
| Guntur | 212 | Prathipadu (Guntur) (SC) | TDP | Ravela Kishore Babu | YSRCP | Mekathoti Sucharitha | INC | Korivi Vinaya Kumar |
| Guntur | 213 | Guntur West | TDP | Modugula Venugopala Reddy | YSRCP | Lella Appi Reddy | INC | Kanna Lakshmi Narayana |
| Guntur | 214 | Guntur East | TDP | Maddali Giridhar Rao | YSRCP | Mohammad Musthafa Shaik | INC | Shaik Mastan Vali |
| Guntur | 215 | Chilakaluripet | TDP | Prathipati Pulla Rao | YSRCP | Marri Rajasekhar | INC | Muppalla Hanumantha Rao |
| Guntur | 216 | Narasaraopet | BJP | Nalabothu Venkata Rao | YSRCP | Gopireddy Srinivasa Reddy | INC | Garnepudi Alexander Sudhakar |
| Guntur | 217 | Sattenapalli | TDP | Kodela Siva Prasada Rao | YSRCP | Ambati Rambabu | INC | Yarram Venkateswarareddy |
| Guntur | 218 | Vinukonda | TDP | G. V. Anjaneyulu | YSRCP | Nannapaneni Sudha | INC | Makkena Mallikarjuna Rao |
| Guntur | 219 | Gurazala | TDP | Yarapathineni Srinivasa Rao | YSRCP | Janga Krishna Murthy | INC | Anam Sanjeeva Reddy |
| Guntur | 220 | Macherla | TDP | Chalamareddy Kommareddy | YSRCP | Pinnelli Ramakrishna Reddy | INC | Ramisetti Narendra Babu |
| Prakasam | 221 | Yerragondapalem (SC) | TDP | Budala Ajitha Rao | YSRCP | David Raju Palaparthi | INC | Kommuri Kanaka Rao |
| Prakasam | 222 | Darsi | TDP | Sidda Raghava Rao | YSRCP | Buchepalli Siva Prasad Reddy | INC | Kotapothula Jwalarao |
| Prakasam | 223 | Parchur | TDP | Yeluri Sambasiva Rao | YSRCP | Gottipati Bharath Kumar | INC | Modugala Krishna Reddy |
| Prakasam | 224 | Addanki | TDP | Karanam Venkatesh | YSRCP | Gottipati Ravi Kumar | INC | Galam Lakshmi |
| Prakasam | 225 | Chirala | TDP | Pothula Suneetha | YSRCP | Balaji Yadam | INC | Mendu Nishanth |
| Prakasam | 226 | Santhanuthalapadu (SC) | TDP | B. N. Vijay Kumar (Note: Friendly contest between TDP and BJP in AC 226 Santhanuthalapadu (SC), AC 245 Kadapa and AC 269 Guntakal) | YSRCP | Audimulapu Suresh | INC | Vema Srinivasa Rao |
| Prakasam | 226 | Santhanuthalapadu (SC) | BJP | Dara Sambaiah | YSRCP | Audimulapu Suresh | INC | Vema Srinivasa Rao |
| Prakasam | 227 | Ongole | TDP | Damacharla Janardhana Rao | YSRCP | Balineni Srinivasa Reddy | INC | Yeddu Sasikanth Bhushan (Peddababu) |
| Prakasam | 228 | Kandukur | TDP | Divi Sivaram | YSRCP | Pothula Ramarao | INC | Rachagarla Venkata Rao |
| Prakasam | 229 | Kondapi (SC) | TDP | Dola Sree Bala Veeranjaneya Swamy | YSRCP | Jupudi Prabhakar Rao | INC | Gurrala Raj Vimal |
| Prakasam | 230 | Markapuram | TDP | Kandula Narayana Reddy | YSRCP | Janke Venkata Reddy | INC | Yeluri Rama Chandra Reddy |
| Prakasam | 231 | Giddalur | TDP | Anna Rambabu | YSRCP | Muthumula Ashok Reddy | INC | Kandula Goutham Nagi Reddy |
| Prakasam | 232 | Kanigiri | TDP | Kadiri Babu Rao | YSRCP | Burra Madhusudan Yadav | INC | Mukku Ugra Narasimha Reddy |
| Nellore | 233 | Kavali | TDP | Beeda Masthan Rao | YSRCP | Ramireddy Pratap Kumar Reddy | INC | Venkata Rao Chintala |
| Nellore | 234 | Atmakur | TDP | Guturu Murali Kanna Babu | YSRCP | Mekapati Goutham Reddy | INC | Anam Ramanarayana Reddy |
| Nellore | 235 | Kovur | TDP | Polamreddy Srinivasulu Reddy | YSRCP | Nallapareddy Prasanna Kumar Reddy | INC | Venkata Ramana Giddaluru |
| Nellore | 236 | Nellore City | TDP | M. Sridhara Krishna Reddy | YSRCP | Poluboina Anil Kumar | INC | Anam Chenchu Subba Reddy |
| Nellore | 237 | Nellore Rural | BJP | Sannapureddy Suresh Reddy | YSRCP | Kotamreddy Sridhar Reddy | INC | Anam Vijaya Kumar Reddy |
| Nellore | 238 | Sarvepalli | TDP | Somireddy Chandra Mohan Reddy | YSRCP | Kakani Govardhan Reddy | INC | Kanimala Pattabhiramaiaiah |
| Nellore | 239 | Gudur (SC) | TDP | Bathala Radha Jyothsna Latha | YSRCP | Pasam Sunil Kumar | INC | Krishnaiah Panabaka |
| Nellore | 240 | Sullurpeta (SC) | TDP | Parasa Venkata Rathnaiah | YSRCP | Kiliveti Sanjeevaiah | INC | Durthati Madhusudhan Rao |
| Nellore | 241 | Venkatagiri | TDP | Kurugondla Ramakrishna | YSRCP | Kommi Lakshmaiah Naidu | INC | Nedurumalli Ramkumar |
| Nellore | 242 | Udayagiri | TDP | Bollineni Venkata Ramarao | YSRCP | Mekapati Chandrasekhar Reddy | INC | Chenchala Babu Ponneboyina |
| Kadapa | 243 | Badvel (SC) | TDP | N. D. Vijaya Jyothi | YSRCP | Thiriveedi Jayaramulu | INC | J. Kamal Prabhash |
| Kadapa | 244 | Rajampet | TDP | Meda Venkata Mallikarjuna Reddy | YSRCP | Akepati Amarnath Reddy | INC | Gajula Bhaskar |
| Kadapa | 245 | Kadapa | TDP | Durgaprasad Rao Sudha | YSRCP | Amzath Basha Shaik Bepari | INC | Maqdoom Moulana Saheb |
| Kadapa | 245 | Kadapa | BJP | Allapu Reddy Harinatha Reddy | YSRCP | Amzath Basha Shaik Bepari | INC | Maqdoom Moulana Saheb |
| Kadapa | 246 | Kodur (SC) | TDP | Obili Subbaramaiah | YSRCP | Koramutla Sreenivasulu | INC | Kanuparthi Eswaraiah |
| Kadapa | 247 | Rayachoti | TDP | Ramesh Kumar Reddy Reddeppagari | YSRCP | Gadikota Srikanth Reddy | INC | Imthiyaz Ahamed Chennur Shaik |
| Kadapa | 248 | Pulivendla | TDP | Singareddy Venkata Satish Kumar Reddy | YSRCP | Y. S. Jagan Mohan Reddy | INC | Kondreddy Rajagopal Reddy |
| Kadapa | 249 | Kamalapuram | TDP | Putha Narasimha Reddy | YSRCP | Pochimareddy Ravindranath Reddy | INC | Inja Soma Sekhar Reddy |
| Kadapa | 250 | Jammalamadugu | TDP | Ponnapureddy Ramasubbareddy | YSRCP | Ch. Adinarayana Reddy | INC | Pamula Bramhananda Reddy |
| Kadapa | 251 | Proddatur | TDP | Nandyala Varada Rajulu Reddy | YSRCP | Rachamallu Siva Prasad Reddy | INC | Gorre Srinivasulu |
| Kadapa | 252 | Mydukur | TDP | Putta Sudhakar Yadav | YSRCP | Settipalli Raghurami Reddy | INC | Kotaiahgari Mallikarjuna Murthy |
| Kurnool | 253 | Allagadda | TDP | G. Prathap Reddy | YSRCP | Bhuma Shobha Nagi Reddy | INC | T. A. Narasimha Rao |
| Kurnool | 254 | Srisailam | TDP | Silpa Chakrapani Reddy | YSRCP | Budda Rajasekhar Reddy | INC | Shabana Momin |
| Kurnool | 255 | Nandikotkur (SC) | TDP | Labbi Venkata Swamy | YSRCP | Isaiah Yakkaladevi | INC | Ashokarathanamu Cherukuri |
| Kurnool | 256 | Kurnool | TDP | T. G. Venkatesh | YSRCP | S. V. Mohan Reddy | INC | Ahmed Ali Khan |
| Kurnool | 257 | Panyam | TDP | Erasu Prathap Reddy | YSRCP | Gowru Charitha Reddy | INC | Akepogu Venkataswamy |
| Kurnool | 258 | Nandyal | TDP | Silpa Mohan Reddy | YSRCP | Bhuma Nagi Reddy | INC | Jupalle Rakesh Reddy |
| Kurnool | 259 | Banaganapalle | TDP | B. C. Janardhan Reddy | YSRCP | Katasani Rami Reddy | INC | Rama Subba Reddy Pera |
| Kurnool | 260 | Dhone | TDP | K. E. Prathap | YSRCP | Buggana Rajendranath | INC | P. Lakshmi Reddy |
| Kurnool | 261 | Pattikonda | TDP | K. E. Krishna Murthy | YSRCP | Kotla Hari Chakrapani Reddy | INC | K. Lakshmi Narayana Reddy |
| Kurnool | 262 | Kodumur (SC) | BJP | Madharapu Renukamma | YSRCP | M. Mani Gandhi | INC | Parigela Murali Krishna |
| Kurnool | 263 | Yemmiganur | TDP | Jaya Nageswara Reddy | YSRCP | K. Jagan Mohan Reddy | INC | Kadimetla Lakshminarayana Reddy |
| Kurnool | 264 | Mantralayam | TDP | Palakurthi Thikkareddy | YSRCP | Y. Balanagi Reddy | INC | R. Ravichandra Reddy |
| Kurnool | 265 | Adoni | TDP | Konka Meenakshi Naidu | YSRCP | Y. Sai Prasad Reddy | INC | Maniyar Yunus |
| Kurnool | 266 | Alur | TDP | B. Veerabhadra Gowd | YSRCP | Gummanur Jayaram | INC | Kotla Sujathamma |
| Anantapur | 267 | Rayadurg | TDP | Kalava Srinivasulu | YSRCP | Kapu Ramachandra Reddy | INC | Vadde M. B. Chinnappayya |
| Anantapur | 268 | Uravakonda | TDP | Payyavula Keshav | YSRCP | Y. Visweswara Reddy | INC | Vasikeri Siva Prasad |
| Anantapur | 269 | Guntakal | TDP | R. Jithendra Goud | YSRCP | Y. Venkatarama Reddy | INC | K. Prabhakar |
| Anantapur | 269 | Guntakal | BJP | Boyagadda Venkataramaiah | YSRCP | Y. Venkatarama Reddy | INC | K. Prabhakar |
| Anantapur | 270 | Tadipatri | TDP | J. C. Prabhakar Reddy | YSRCP | V. R. Rami Reddy | INC | Ambati Viswantha Reddy |
| Anantapur | 271 | Singanamala (SC) | TDP | B. Yamini Bala | YSRCP | Jonnalagadda Padmavathy | INC | Sake Sailajanath |
| Anantapur | 272 | Anantapur Urban | TDP | V. Prabhakar Chowdary | YSRCP | B. Gurunatha Reddy | INC | V. Govardhan Reddy |
| Anantapur | 273 | Kalyandurg | TDP | Vunnam Hanumantharaya Chowdary | YSRCP | Boya Thippe Swamy | Did not contest | |
| Anantapur | 274 | Raptadu | TDP | Paritala Sunitha | YSRCP | Thopudurthi Prakash Reddy | INC | Mylarapu Ramana Reddy |
| Anantapur | 275 | Madakasira (SC) | TDP | K. Eranna | YSRCP | M. Thippeswamy | INC | K. Sudhakar |
| Anantapur | 276 | Hindupur | TDP | Nandamuri Balakrishna | YSRCP | B. Naveen Nischal | INC | M.H. Enayathulla |
| Anantapur | 277 | Penukonda | TDP | B. K. Parthasarathi | YSRCP | Malagundla Sankaranarayana | INC | Raghu Veera Reddy |
| Anantapur | 278 | Puttaparthi | TDP | Palle Raghunatha Reddy | YSRCP | Chinthapanti Somasekhara Reddy | INC | Samakoti Adinarayana |
| Anantapur | 279 | Dharmavaram | TDP | Gonugguntla Suryanarayana | YSRCP | Kethireddy Venkatarami Reddy | INC | Rangana Aswarthanarayana |
| Anantapur | 280 | Kadiri | TDP | Kandikunta Venkata Prasad | YSRCP | Attar Chand Basha | INC | V. Sriramulu Naik |
| Chittoor | 281 | Thamballapalle | TDP | G. Shankar | YSRCP | A. V. Praveen Kumar Reddy | INC | M. N. Chandra Sekhar Reddy |
| Chittoor | 282 | Pileru | TDP | K. Iqbal Ahmmed Khan | YSRCP | Chinthala Ramachandra Reddy | INC | G. Shanawaz Ali Khan |
| Chittoor | 283 | Madanapalle | BJP | Challapalle Narasimha Reddy | YSRCP | Desai Thippa Reddy | INC | Mohammed Shahjahan Basha |
| Chittoor | 284 | Punganur | TDP | M. Venkataramana Raju | YSRCP | Peddireddy Ramachandra Reddy | INC | S. K. Venkatramana Reddy |
| Chittoor | 285 | Chandragiri | TDP | Galla Aruna Kumari | YSRCP | Chevireddy Bhaskar Reddy | INC | Kanchana Venugopal Reddy |
| Chittoor | 286 | Tirupati | TDP | M. Venkataramana | YSRCP | Bhumana Karunakar Reddy | INC | Mabbu Deva Narayana Reddy |
| Chittoor | 287 | Srikalahasti | TDP | Bojjala Gopala Krishna Reddy | YSRCP | Biyyapu Madhusudhan Reddy | INC | S. Batheiah Nayudu |
| Chittoor | 288 | Satyavedu (SC) | TDP | Talari Aditya | YSRCP | Koneti Adimulam | INC | Penubala Chandra Sekhar |
| Chittoor | 289 | Nagari | TDP | Gali Muddu Krishnama Naidu | YSRCP | Roja Selvamani | INC | Sathya Swarupa Indira Vakati |
| Chittoor | 290 | Gangadhara Nellore (SC) | TDP | Gummadi Kuthuhalamma | YSRCP | K. Narayana Swamy | INC | Narasimhulu Sodem |
| Chittoor | 291 | Chittoor | TDP | D. A. Sathya Prabha | YSRCP | Arani Srinivasulu | INC | M. Narasimhulu Naidu |
| Chittoor | 292 | Puthalapattu (SC) | TDP | L. Lalitha Kumari | YSRCP | M. Sunil Kumar | INC | Ashok Raja Munaswamappa |
| Chittoor | 293 | Palamaner | TDP | R. V. Subash Chandra Bose | YSRCP | N. Amarnath Reddy | INC | Thippireddy Gari Parthasarathy Reddy |
| Chittoor | 294 | Kuppam | TDP | N. Chandrababu Naidu | YSRCP | K. Chandramouli | INC | K. Srinivasulu |

== Opinion polls ==
=== Andhra Pradesh ===
| Polling firm/Commissioner | Date published | | | |
| Polling firm/Commissioner | Date published | TDP+ | YSRCP | Others |
| Aaraa | 21 April 2014 | 55-65 | 105-112 | 10-15 |

=== Telangana ===
| Polling firm/Commissioner | Date published | | | | | |
| Polling firm/Commissioner | Date published | UPA | TRS | AIMIM | TDP+ | YSRCP |
| Aaraa | 21 April 2014 | 43-45 | 52-57 | 6-7 | 12-15 | 3-6 |

== Election day ==
The election was held in two phases alongside the 7th and 8th phases of the General Election, taking place on 30 April in Telangana, and on 7 May in the remainder of Andhra Pradesh.

Despite few clashes between supporters of rival parties in Seemandhra and Rayalaseema, the poll percentage was good on the polling day. The initial poll percentage appeared to be dull, but it soon picked up as time went on. Chief Electoral Officer Bhanwar Lal told the media that he was confident that the turnout could be around 85–90% by the concluding time.

=== Phase 1 (Telangana) ===
Polling passed off peacefully with more than 72% of more than 2.81 crore voters exercising their franchise in the 10 districts in the region. Chief Electoral Officer Bhanwarlal said the polling could touch 75%. In 2009, the turnout was 67.71% in the region.

=== Phase 2 (Andhra Pradesh) ===
Chief Electoral Officer Bhanwarlal said around 76.80% of the 3.68 crore voters exercised their franchise across 175 Assembly and 25 Lok Sabha constituencies in the region and the voting percentage were seen as likely to touch 80%. The highest turnout of 82.97% was recorded in the Guntur district and the lowest of 70% in Visakhapatnam district.

== Results ==
=== Vote share before bifurcation ===
Vote share by party
1. Telugu Desam Party (32.5%)
2. YSR Congress Party (27.9%)
3. Telangana Rashtra Samithi (13.7%)
4. Indian National Congress (11.7%)
5. Bharatiya Janata Party (4.13%)
6. Others (10.1%)

=== Results by party before bifurcation ===
Source: Election Commission of India
| Alliance/Party | | Popular vote | | | Seats | | |
| Alliance/Party | | Votes | % | ±pp | Contested | Won | +/− |
|---|---|---|---|---|---|---|---|
| NDA | Telugu Desam Party | 15,746,215 | 32.53 | ▲4.41 | 237 | 117 | ▲25 |
| NDA | Bharatiya Janata Party | 2,000,677 | 4.13 | ▲1.29 | 58 | 9 | ▲7 |
| NDA | Total | 17,746,892 | 36.66 | N/A | 295 | 126 | N/A |
| YSR Congress Party | | 13,494,076 | 27.88 | ▲27.88 | 266 | 70 | ▲70 |
| Telangana Rashtra Samithi | | 6,620,326 | 13.68 | ▲9.69 | 119 | 63 | ▲53 |
| Indian National Congress | | 5,668,061 | 11.71 | ▼24.84 | 286 | 21 | ▼135 |
| All India Majlis-e-Ittehadul Muslimeen | | 737,134 | 1.52 | ▲0.69 | 35 | 7 | Steady |
| Bahujan Samaj Party | | 458,762 | 0.95 | ▼0.15 | 253 | 2 | ▲2 |
| Communist Party of India (Marxist) | | 407,376 | 0.84 | ▼0.59 | 68 | 1 | Steady |
| Communist Party of India | | 254,859 | 0.53 | ▼0.69 | 38 | 1 | ▼3 |
| Other parties | | 1,219,171 | 2.52 | N/A | 1,333 | 1 | N/A |
| Independents | | 1,485,463 | 3.07 | ▼1.50 | 1,511 | 2 | ▼1 |
| NOTA | | 308,286 | 0.64 | | | | |
| Total | | 48,400,406 | 100.00 | N/A | 4,204 | 294 | N/A |
Vote statistics
| Valid votes | | 48,400,406 | 99.81 | | | | |
| Invalid votes | | 92,061 | 0.19 | | | | |
| Votes cast/Turnout | | 48,492,467 | 74.68 | | | | |
| Abstentions | | 16,441,671 | 25.32 | | | | |
| Registered voters | | 64,934,138 | | | | | |

=== Results by party after bifurcation ===
| Alliance/Party | | Andhra Pradesh | | | Telangana | | |
| Alliance/Party | | Votes | % | Seats | Votes | % | Seats |
|---|---|---|---|---|---|---|---|
| NDA | Telugu Desam Party | 12,916,000 | 44.90 | 102 | 2,828,492 | 14.70 | 15 |
| NDA | Bharatiya Janata Party | 632,599 | 2.20 | 4 | 1,367,751 | 7.10 | 5 |
| NDA | Total | 13,548,599 | 47.10 | 106 | 4,196,243 | 21.80 | 20 |
| YSR Congress Party | | 12,840,033 | 44.60 | 67 | 653,016 | 3.40 | 3 |
| Telangana Rashtra Samithi | | Did not contest | | | 6,618,972 | 34.30 | 63 |
| Indian National Congress | | 802,452 | 2.80 | 0 | 4,864,808 | 25.20 | 21 |
| All India Majlis-e-Ittehadul Muslimeen | | 10,432 | 0.00 | 0 | 726,261 | 3.80 | 7 |
| Bahujan Samaj Party | | 196,604 | 0.70 | 0 | 262,057 | 1.40 | 2 |
| Communist Party of India (Marxist) | | 106,868 | 0.50 | 0 | 300,508 | 1.60 | 1 |
| Communist Party of India | | 82,228 | 0.30 | 0 | 172,631 | 0.90 | 1 |
| Other parties | | 537,803 | 1.70 | 1 | 372,692 | 1.80 | 0 |
| Independents | | 514,129 | 1.80 | 1 | 972,069 | 5.00 | 1 |
| NOTA | | 156,121 | 0.50 | N/A | 152,077 | 0.80 | N/A |
| Total | | 28,795,269 | 100.0 | 175 | 19,291,334 | 100.0 | 119 |
| Registered voters | | 36,716,839 | | | 28,165,885 | | |

== Andhra Pradesh Results ==
=== Vote share ===
Vote share by party
1. Telugu Desam Party (44.9%)
2. YSR Congress Party (44.6%)
3. Indian National Congress (2.80%)
4. Bharatiya Janata Party (2.20%)
5. Others (5.50%)

=== Seat share ===
Seat share by party
1. Telugu Desam Party (58.3%)
2. YSR Congress Party (38.3%)
3. Bharatiya Janata Party (2.29%)
4. Others (1.14%)

=== Results by party ===
| Alliance/Party | | Seats won |
|---|---|---|
| NDA | Telugu Desam Party | 102 |
| NDA | Bharatiya Janata Party | 4 |
| NDA | Total | 106 |
| YSR Congress Party | | 67 |
| Other parties | | 1 |
| Independents | | 1 |
| Total | | 175 |

=== Results by district ===
| District | Seats | | | | |
| District | Seats | TDP | YCP | BJP | OTH |
| Srikakulam | 10 | 7 | 3 | —N/a | —N/a |
| Vizianagaram | 9 | 6 | 3 | —N/a | —N/a |
| Visakhapatnam | 15 | 11 | 3 | 1 | —N/a |
| East Godavari | 19 | 12 | 5 | 1 | 1 |
| West Godavari | 15 | 14 | —N/a | 1 | —N/a |
| Krishna | 16 | 10 | 5 | 1 | —N/a |
| Guntur | 17 | 12 | 5 | —N/a | —N/a |
| Prakasam | 12 | 5 | 6 | —N/a | 1 |
| Nellore | 10 | 3 | 7 | —N/a | —N/a |
| Kadapa | 10 | 1 | 9 | —N/a | —N/a |
| Kurnool | 14 | 3 | 11 | —N/a | —N/a |
| Anantapuram | 14 | 12 | 2 | —N/a | —N/a |
| Chittoor | 14 | 6 | 8 | —N/a | —N/a |
| Total | 175 | 102 | 67 | 4 | 2 |

=== Results by Region ===
| Region | Seats | | | | |
| Region | Seats | TDP | YCP | BJP | OTH |
| North Coastal Andhra (Note: Includes Srikakulam, Visakhapatnam and Vizianagaram districts) | 34 | 24 | 9 | 1 | —N/a |
| Godavari (Note: Includes East Godavari and West Godavari districts) | 34 | 26 | 5 | 2 | 1 |
| Amaravati–APCR (Note: Includes Guntur and Krishna districts) | 33 | 22 | 10 | 1 | —N/a |
| South Coastal Andhra (Note: Includes Prakasam and Nellore districts) | 22 | 8 | 13 | —N/a | 1 |
| Rayalaseema (Note: Includes Ananthapuramu, Chittoor, Kadapa and Kurnool districts) | 52 | 22 | 30 | —N/a | —N/a |
| Total | 175 | 102 | 67 | 4 | 2 |

=== Results by District Vote Percentage ===
| District | Seats | | | | | | | | |
| District | Seats | TDP+BJP | | YSRCP | | INC | | Others | |
| District | Seats | Seats | Vote (%) | Seats | Vote (%) | Seats | Vote (%) | Seats | Vote (%) |
| Srikakulam | 10 | 7 | 49.57% | 3 | 43.93% | 0 | 2.18% | 0 | 4.32% |
| Vizianagaram | 9 | 6 | 43.22% | 3 | 38.34% | 0 | 12.10% | 0 | 6.34% |
| Visakhapatnam | 15 | 12 | 47.86% | 3 | 41.43% | 0 | 2.93% | 0 | 7.78% |
| East Godavari | 19 | 13 | 46.48% | 5 | 42.16% | 0 | 1.61% | 1 | 9.75% |
| West Godavari | 15 | 15 | 51.48% | 0 | 41.62% | 0 | 1.22% | 0 | 5.67% |
| Krishna | 16 | 11 | 48.44% | 5 | 43.70% | 0 | 2.48% | 0 | 5.37% |
| Guntur | 17 | 12 | 48.37% | 5 | 45.17% | 0 | 3.02% | 0 | 3.44% |
| Prakasam | 12 | 5 | 45.46% | 6 | 46.82% | 0 | 0.82% | 1 | 6.90% |
| Nellore | 10 | 3 | 43.90% | 7 | 48.70% | 0 | 2.99% | 0 | 4.40% |
| Kadapa | 10 | 1 | 41.85% | 9 | 53.33% | 0 | 1.12% | 0 | 3.71% |
| Kurnool | 14 | 3 | 44.17% | 11 | 48.95% | 0 | 1.92% | 0 | 4.96% |
| Anantapuram | 14 | 12 | 49.91% | 2 | 43.92% | 0 | 2.16% | 0 | 4.01% |
| Chittoor | 14 | 6 | 44.61% | 8 | 46.28% | 0 | 1.74% | 0 | 7.36% |
| Total | 175 | 106 | 46.80% | 67 | 44.35% | 0 | 2.77% | 2 | 6.08% |

=== Results by constituency ===
| District | Constituency | | Winner | | | | Runner Up | | | | Margin | |
| District | No. | Name | Candidate | Party | Votes | % | Candidate | Party | Votes | % | Margin | |
|---|---|---|---|---|---|---|---|---|---|---|---|---|
| Srikakulam | 120 | Ichchapuram | Ashok Bendalam | TDP | 86,815 | 53.95 | Nartu Rama Rao | YSRCP | 61,537 | 38.24 | Margin | 25,278 |
| Srikakulam | 121 | Palasa | Gouthu Syam Sunder Sivaji | TDP | 69,658 | 50.74 | Vajja Babu Rao | YSRCP | 52,133 | 37.97 | 17,525 | |
| Srikakulam | 122 | Tekkali | Kinjarapu Atchannaidu | TDP | 81,167 | 50.60 | Duvvada Srinivas | YSRCP | 72,780 | 45.38 | 8,387 | |
| Srikakulam | 123 | Pathapatnam | K. Venkata Ramana Murthy | YSRCP | 69,320 | 49.15 | Vijaya Ramaraju Setrucharla | TDP | 65,455 | 46.41 | 3,865 | |
| Srikakulam | 124 | Srikakulam | Gunda Lakshmi Devi | TDP | 88,814 | 53.98 | Dharmana Prasada Rao | YSRCP | 64,683 | 39.32 | 24,131 | |
| Srikakulam | 125 | Amadalavalasa | Koona Ravi Kumar | TDP | 65,233 | 48.64 | Thammineni Seetharam | YSRCP | 59,784 | 44.58 | 5,449 | |
| Srikakulam | 126 | Etcherla | Kimidi Kalavenkata Rao | TDP | 85,769 | 49.29 | Gorle Kiran Kumar | YSRCP | 81,028 | 46.57 | 4,741 | |
| Srikakulam | 127 | Narasannapeta | Baggu Ramanamurthy | TDP | 76,559 | 49.34 | Dharmana Krishna Das | YSRCP | 71,759 | 46.25 | 4,800 | |
| Srikakulam | 128 | Rajam (SC) | Kambala Jogulu | YSRCP | 69,192 | 46.79 | K. Pratibha Bharati | TDP | 68,680 | 46.44 | 512 | |
| Srikakulam | 129 | Palakonda (ST) | Viswasarayi Kalavathi | YSRCP | 55,337 | 45.57 | Nimmaka Jaya Krishna | TDP | 53,717 | 44.24 | 1,620 | |
| Vizianagaram | 130 | Kurupam (ST) | Pushpasreevani Pamula | YSRCP | 55,435 | 41.60 | J. T. V. V. Thodaramala | TDP | 36,352 | 27.28 | 19,083 | |
| Vizianagaram | 131 | Parvathipuram (SC) | Bobbili Chiranjeevulu | TDP | 62,458 | 47.94 | Jammana Prasanna Kumar | YSRCP | 56,329 | 43.24 | 6,129 | |
| Vizianagaram | 132 | Salur (ST) | Peedika Rajanna Dora | YSRCP | 63,755 | 47.28 | R. P. Bhanj Deo | TDP | 58,758 | 43.57 | 4,997 | |
| Vizianagaram | 133 | Bobbili | R. V. Sujay Krishna Ranga Rao | YSRCP | 83,587 | 49.67 | Thentu Lakshmu Naidu | TDP | 76,629 | 45.54 | 6,958 | |
| Vizianagaram | 134 | Cheepurupalli | Kimidi Mrunalini | TDP | 63,787 | 41.41 | Botsa Satyanarayana | INC | 42,945 | 27.88 | 20,842 | |
| Vizianagaram | 135 | Gajapathinagaram | Kondapalli Appala Naidu | TDP | 65,117 | 40.77 | Kadubandi Srinivasa Rao | YSRCP | 45,694 | 28.61 | 19,423 | |
| Vizianagaram | 136 | Nellimarla | P. Narayanaswamy Naidu | TDP | 71,267 | 42.88 | P. V. V. Suryanarayana Raju | YSRCP | 64,294 | 38.69 | 6,973 | |
| Vizianagaram | 137 | Vizianagaram | Meesala Geetha | TDP | 77,320 | 49.82 | Kolagatla Veerabhadra Swamy | YSRCP | 61,916 | 39.89 | 15,404 | |
| Vizianagaram | 138 | Srungavarapukota | Kolla Lalitha Kumari | TDP | 82,177 | 47.74 | Rongali Jagannadham | YSRCP | 53,605 | 31.14 | 28,572 | |
| Visakhapatnam | 139 | Bheemilli | Ganta Srinivasa Rao | TDP | 118,020 | 55.70 | Karri Sita Ramu | YSRCP | 80,794 | 38.13 | 37,226 | |
| Visakhapatnam | 140 | Visakhapatnam East | Velagapudi Ramakrishna Babu | TDP | 100,624 | 60.45 | Vamsi Krishna Srinivas | YSRCP | 52,741 | 31.69 | 47,883 | |
| Visakhapatnam | 141 | Visakhapatnam South | Vasupalli Ganesh Kumar | TDP | 66,686 | 51.45 | Kola Guruvulu | YSRCP | 48,370 | 37.32 | 18,316 | |
| Visakhapatnam | 142 | Visakhapatnam North | Penmetsa Vishnu Kumar Raju | BJP | 82,079 | 51.34 | Chokkakula Venkata Rao | YSRCP | 63,839 | 39.93 | 18,240 | |
| Visakhapatnam | 143 | Visakhapatnam West | P. G. V. R. Naidu | TDP | 76,791 | 56.66 | Dadi Ratnakar | YSRCP | 45,934 | 33.89 | 30,857 | |
| Visakhapatnam | 144 | Gajuwaka | Palla Srinivas Rao | TDP | 97,109 | 51.54 | Tippala Nagireddy | YSRCP | 75,397 | 40.02 | 21,712 | |
| Visakhapatnam | 145 | Chodavaram | K. Suryana Naga Sanyasi Raju | TDP | 80,560 | 48.36 | Karanam Dharmasri | YSRCP | 79,651 | 47.81 | 909 | |
| Visakhapatnam | 146 | Madugula | Budi Mutyala Naidu | YSRCP | 72,299 | 49.13 | Gavireddi Ramanaidu | TDP | 67,538 | 45.89 | 4,761 | |
| Visakhapatnam | 147 | Araku Valley (ST) | Kidari Sarveswara Rao | YSRCP | 63,700 | 42.44 | Siveri Soma | TDP | 29,647 | 19.75 | 34,053 | |
| Visakhapatnam | 148 | Paderu (ST) | Giddi Eswari | YSRCP | 52,384 | 40.97 | Goddeti Demudu | CPI | 26,243 | 20.53 | 26,141 | |
| Visakhapatnam | 149 | Anakapalle | Peela Govinda Satyanarayana | TDP | 79,911 | 53.33 | Konathala Raghunath | YSRCP | 57,570 | 38.42 | 22,341 | |
| Visakhapatnam | 150 | Pendurthi | Bandaru Satyanarayana Murthy | TDP | 94,531 | 51.87 | Gandi Babji | YSRCP | 75,883 | 41.64 | 18,648 | |
| Visakhapatnam | 151 | Elamanchili | Panchakarla Ramesh Babu | TDP | 80,563 | 50.60 | Pragada Nageswara Rao | YSRCP | 72,188 | 45.34 | 8,375 | |
| Visakhapatnam | 152 | Payakaraopet (SC) | Vangalapudi Anitha | TDP | 86,355 | 48.02 | Changala Venkata Rao | YSRCP | 83,527 | 46.44 | 2,828 | |
| Visakhapatnam | 153 | Narsipatnam | Chintakayala Ayyanna Patrudu | TDP | 79,726 | 48.86 | Petla Uma Sankara Ganesh | YSRCP | 77,388 | 47.42 | 2,338 | |
| East Godavari | 154 | Tuni | Dadisetti Raja | YSRCP | 84,755 | 52.98 | Yanamala Rama Krishnudu | TDP | 66,182 | 41.37 | 18,573 | |
| East Godavari | 155 | Prathipadu | Varupula Subbarao | YSRCP | 63,693 | 43.01 | P. S. Satyanarayana Murthy | TDP | 60,280 | 40.71 | 3,413 | |
| East Godavari | 156 | Pithapuram | S. V. S. N. Varma | IND | 97,511 | 57.59 | Dorababu Pendem | YSRCP | 50,431 | 29.78 | 47,080 | |
| East Godavari | 157 | Kakinada Rural | Pilli Anantha Lakshmi | TDP | 61,144 | 36.98 | C. S. Venugopala Krishna | YSRCP | 52,096 | 31.51 | 9,048 | |
| East Godavari | 158 | Peddapuram | Nimmakayala Chinarajappa | TDP | 75,914 | 50.49 | Thota Subbarao Naidu | YSRCP | 65,251 | 43.40 | 10,663 | |
| East Godavari | 159 | Anaparthy | Nallamilli Ramakrishna Reddy | TDP | 83,398 | 47.85 | Sathi Suryanarayana Reddy | YSRCP | 82,025 | 47.07 | 1,373 | |
| East Godavari | 160 | Kakinada City | Vanamadi Venkateswara Rao | TDP | 76,467 | 54.42 | D. Chandrasekhara Reddy | YSRCP | 52,467 | 37.34 | 24,000 | |
| East Godavari | 161 | Ramachandrapuram | Thota Trimurthulu | TDP | 85,254 | 53.24 | Pilli Subhash Chandra Bose | YSRCP | 68,332 | 42.67 | 16,922 | |
| East Godavari | 162 | Mummidivaram | Datla Subbaraju | TDP | 98,274 | 56.68 | G. V. Sai Srinivasa Rao | YSRCP | 68,736 | 39.65 | 29,538 | |
| East Godavari | 163 | Amalapuram (SC) | Aithabathula Ananda Rao | TDP | 76,444 | 50.99 | Golla Babu Rao | YSRCP | 64,031 | 42.71 | 12,413 | |
| East Godavari | 164 | Razole (SC) | Gollapalli Surya Rao | TDP | 66,960 | 49.52 | Bonthu Rajeswara Rao | YSRCP | 62,277 | 46.05 | 4,683 | |
| East Godavari | 165 | Gannavaram (SC) | Pulaparty Narayana Murty | TDP | 74,967 | 52.49 | Kondeti Chittibabu | YSRCP | 61,462 | 43.04 | 13,505 | |
| East Godavari | 166 | Kothapeta | Chirla Jaggi Reddy | YSRCP | 88,357 | 46.99 | Bandaru Satyananda Rao | TDP | 87,644 | 46.61 | 713 | |
| East Godavari | 167 | Mandapeta | V. Jogeswara Rao | TDP | 100,113 | 58.34 | Girajala Venkata Swamy Naidu | YSRCP | 64,099 | 37.35 | 36,014 | |
| East Godavari | 168 | Rajanagaram | Pendurthi Venkatesh | TDP | 81,476 | 50.68 | Jakkampudi Vijaya Lakshmi | YSRCP | 72,589 | 45.15 | 8,887 | |
| East Godavari | 169 | Rajahmundry City | Akula Satyanarayana | BJP | 79,531 | 50.24 | Bommana Raj Kumar | YSRCP | 53,154 | 33.57 | 26,377 | |
| East Godavari | 170 | Rajahmundry Rural | Gorantla Butchaiah Chowdary | TDP | 87,540 | 52.22 | Akula Veerraju | YSRCP | 69,482 | 41.45 | 18,058 | |
| East Godavari | 171 | Jaggampeta | Jyothula Nehru | YSRCP | 88,146 | 53.03 | Jyothula Chantibabu | TDP | 72,214 | 43.45 | 15,932 | |
| East Godavari | 172 | Rampachodavaram (ST) | Vanthala Rajeswari | YSRCP | 52,156 | 45.36 | Seethamsetti Venkateswara Rao | TDP | 43,934 | 38.21 | 8,222 | |
| West Godavari | 173 | Kovvur (SC) | Kothapalli Samuel Jawahar | TDP | 74,661 | 51.88 | Taneti Vanitha | YSRCP | 61,916 | 43.02 | 12,745 | |
| West Godavari | 174 | Nidadavole | Burugupalli Sesharao | TDP | 81,591 | 49.93 | S. Rajiv Krishna | YSRCP | 75,232 | 46.04 | 6,359 | |
| West Godavari | 175 | Achanta | Pithani Satyanarayana | TDP | 63,549 | 48.66 | Mudunuri Prasada Raju | YSRCP | 59,629 | 45.66 | 3,920 | |
| West Godavari | 176 | Palakollu | Nimmala Rama Naidu | TDP | 51,523 | 36.28 | Chavatapalli Satyanarayana Murthy | YSRCP | 45,140 | 31.78 | 6,383 | |
| West Godavari | 177 | Narasapuram | Bandaru Madhava Naidu | TDP | 72,747 | 56.00 | Kothapalli Subbarayudu | YSRCP | 21,712 | 16.71 | 51,035 | |
| West Godavari | 178 | Bhimavaram | Pulaparthi Ramanjaneyulu | TDP | 90,772 | 51.61 | Grandhi Srinivas | YSRCP | 77,046 | 43.81 | 13,726 | |
| West Godavari | 179 | Undi | V. V. Siva Rama Raju | TDP | 101,530 | 58.21 | Pathapati Sarraju | YSRCP | 65,299 | 37.44 | 36,231 | |
| West Godavari | 180 | Tanuku | Arimilli Radha Krishna | TDP | 101,015 | 56.31 | Cheerla Radha Krishna | YSRCP | 70,067 | 39.06 | 30,948 | |
| West Godavari | 181 | Tadepalligudem | Pydikondala Manikyala Rao | BJP | 73,339 | 46.74 | T. P. G. Satyanarayana | YSRCP | 59,266 | 37.77 | 14,073 | |
| West Godavari | 182 | Unguturu | Ganni Veeranjaneyulu | TDP | 82,118 | 50.50 | Puppala Srinivasa Rao | YSRCP | 73,188 | 45.01 | 8,930 | |
| West Godavari | 183 | Denduluru | Chintamaneni Prabhakar | TDP | 92,209 | 53.67 | Karumuri Venkata Nageswara Rao | YSRCP | 74,463 | 43.34 | 17,746 | |
| West Godavari | 184 | Eluru | Badeti Bujji | TDP | 82,483 | 55.68 | Alla Nani | YSRCP | 57,880 | 39.07 | 24,603 | |
| West Godavari | 185 | Gopalapuram (SC) | Muppidi Venkateswara Rao | TDP | 95,299 | 51.14 | Talari Venkat Rao | YSRCP | 83,759 | 44.95 | 11,540 | |
| West Godavari | 186 | Polavaram (ST) | Modiyam Srinivasa Rao | TDP | 83,767 | 51.05 | Tellam Balaraju | YSRCP | 68,047 | 41.47 | 15,720 | |
| West Godavari | 187 | Chintalapudi (SC) | Peethala Sujatha | TDP | 105,417 | 52.04 | Burla Devi Priya | YSRCP | 90,253 | 44.56 | 15,164 | |
| Krishna | 188 | Tiruvuru (SC) | Kokkiligadda Rakshana Nidhi | YSRCP | 78,144 | 47.90 | Nallagatla Swamy Das | TDP | 76,468 | 46.87 | 1,676 | |
| Krishna | 189 | Nuzvid | Meka Venkata Pratap Apparao | YSRCP | 95,565 | 50.67 | Muddaraboina Venkateswara Rao | TDP | 85,168 | 45.16 | 10,397 | |
| Krishna | 190 | Gannavaram (Krishna) | Vallabhaneni Vamsi Mohan | TDP | 99,163 | 49.74 | Dutta Ramachandra Rao | YSRCP | 89,615 | 44.95 | 9,548 | |
| Krishna | 191 | Gudivada | Kodali Nani | YSRCP | 81,298 | 51.32 | Raavi Venkateswara Rao | TDP | 69,761 | 44.03 | 11,537 | |
| Krishna | 192 | Kaikalur | Kamineni Srinivas | BJP | 88,092 | 53.80 | Uppala Rama Prasad | YSRCP | 66,521 | 40.63 | 21,571 | |
| Krishna | 193 | Pedana | Kagitha Venkata Rao | TDP | 71,779 | 53.00 | Buragadda Vedavyas | YSRCP | 58,085 | 42.89 | 13,694 | |
| Krishna | 194 | Machilipatnam | Kollu Ravindra | TDP | 75,209 | 53.43 | Perni Nani | YSRCP | 59,403 | 42.20 | 15,806 | |
| Krishna | 195 | Avanigadda | Mandali Buddha Prasad | TDP | 80,995 | 48.14 | Simhadri Ramesh Babu | YSRCP | 75,037 | 44.60 | 5,958 | |
| Krishna | 196 | Pamarru (SC) | Uppuleti Kalpana | YSRCP | 69,546 | 45.83 | Varla Ramaiah | TDP | 68,477 | 45.12 | 1,069 | |
| Krishna | 197 | Penamaluru | Bode Prasad | TDP | 102,330 | 54.98 | Kukkala Vidyasagar | YSRCP | 70,882 | 38.08 | 31,448 | |
| Krishna | 198 | Vijayawada West | Jaleel Khan | YSRCP | 63,180 | 40.89 | Vellampalli Srinivas | BJP | 60,072 | 38.88 | 3,108 | |
| Krishna | 199 | Vijayawada Central | Bonda Umamaheswara Rao | TDP | 82,669 | 48.50 | Punuru Gowtham Reddy | YSRCP | 55,508 | 32.56 | 27,161 | |
| Krishna | 200 | Vijayawada East | Gadde Rama Mohan | TDP | 88,784 | 47.95 | Vangaveeti Radha Krishna | YSRCP | 73,281 | 39.58 | 15,503 | |
| Krishna | 201 | Mylavaram | Devineni Uma Maheswara Rao | TDP | 94,539 | 47.00 | Jogi Ramesh | YSRCP | 86,970 | 43.24 | 7,569 | |
| Krishna | 202 | Nandigama (SC) | Tangirala Prabhakara Rao | TDP | 78,721 | 50.01 | Monditoka Jagan Mohana Rao | YSRCP | 73,509 | 46.70 | 5,212 | |
| Krishna | 203 | Jaggayyapeta | Rajagopal Sreeram | TDP | 80,939 | 48.84 | Samineni Udaya Bhanu | YSRCP | 79,093 | 47.73 | 1,846 | |
| Guntur | 204 | Pedakurapadu | Kommalapati Sridhar | TDP | 90,310 | 50.33 | Bolla Brahma Naidu | YSRCP | 81,114 | 45.21 | 9,196 | |
| Guntur | 205 | Tadikonda (SC) | Tenali Sravan Kumar | TDP | 80,847 | 50.70 | Heni Christina Kathera | YSRCP | 73,305 | 45.97 | 7,542 | |
| Guntur | 206 | Mangalagiri | Alla Ramakrishna Reddy | YSRCP | 88,977 | 44.73 | Ganji Chiranjeevi | TDP | 88,965 | 44.72 | 12 | |
| Guntur | 207 | Ponnur | Dhulipalla Narendra Kumar | TDP | 88,386 | 50.15 | Raavi Venkata Ramana | YSRCP | 80,625 | 45.74 | 7,761 | |
| Guntur | 208 | Vemuru (SC) | Nakka Ananda Babu | TDP | 77,222 | 48.66 | Merugu Nagarjuna | YSRCP | 75,095 | 47.32 | 2,127 | |
| Guntur | 209 | Repalle | Anagani Satya Prasad | TDP | 85,076 | 48.69 | Mopidevi Venkataramana | YSRCP | 71,721 | 41.05 | 13,355 | |
| Guntur | 210 | Tenali | Alapati Rajendra Prasad | TDP | 93,524 | 48.91 | Annabathuni Siva Kumar | YSRCP | 74,459 | 38.94 | 19,065 | |
| Guntur | 211 | Bapatla | Kona Raghupathi | YSRCP | 71,076 | 50.12 | Annam Satish Prabhakar | TDP | 65,263 | 46.02 | 5,813 | |
| Guntur | 212 | Prathipadu (Guntur) (SC) | Ravela Kishore Babu | TDP | 96,274 | 49.86 | Mekathoti Sucharita | YSRCP | 88,869 | 46.02 | 7,405 | |
| Guntur | 213 | Guntur West | Modugula Venugopala Reddy | TDP | 78,837 | 46.00 | Lella Appi Reddy | YSRCP | 60,924 | 35.55 | 17,913 | |
| Guntur | 214 | Guntur East | Mohammad Musthafa Shaik | YSRCP | 74,131 | 47.66 | Maddali Giridhar Rao | TDP | 70,980 | 45.63 | 3,151 | |
| Guntur | 215 | Chilakaluripet | Prathipati Pulla Rao | TDP | 89,591 | 51.57 | Marri Rajasekhar | YSRCP | 78,907 | 45.42 | 10,684 | |
| Guntur | 216 | Narasaraopet | Gopireddy Srinivasa Reddy | YSRCP | 87,761 | 53.13 | Nalabothu Venkata Rao | BJP | 71,995 | 43.59 | 15,766 | |
| Guntur | 217 | Sattenapalle | Kodela Siva Prasada Rao | TDP | 85,247 | 47.96 | Ambati Rambabu | YSRCP | 84,323 | 47.44 | 924 | |
| Guntur | 218 | Vinukonda | G. V. Anjaneyulu | TDP | 104,321 | 52.77 | Nannapaneni Sudha | YSRCP | 82,914 | 41.94 | 21,407 | |
| Guntur | 219 | Gurazala | Yarapathineni Srinivasa Rao | TDP | 94,827 | 48.85 | Janga Krishna Murthy | YSRCP | 87,640 | 45.15 | 7,187 | |
| Guntur | 220 | Macherla | Pinnelli Ramakrishna Reddy | YSRCP | 94,249 | 48.73 | Kommareddy Chalama Reddy | TDP | 90,714 | 46.90 | 3,535 | |
| Prakasam | 221 | Yerragondapalem (SC) | David Raju Palaparthi | YSRCP | 85,774 | 54.33 | Budala Ajitha Rao | TDP | 66,703 | 42.25 | 19,071 | |
| Prakasam | 222 | Darsi | Sidda Raghava Rao | TDP | 88,821 | 48.80 | Buchepalli Siva Prasad Reddy | YSRCP | 87,447 | 48.05 | 1,374 | |
| Prakasam | 223 | Parchur | Yeluri Sambasiva Rao | TDP | 97,248 | 51.52 | Gottipati Bharath Kumar | YSRCP | 86,473 | 45.81 | 10,775 | |
| Prakasam | 224 | Addanki | Gottipati Ravi Kumar | YSRCP | 99,537 | 50.03 | Karanam Venkatesh | TDP | 95,302 | 47.90 | 4,235 | |
| Prakasam | 225 | Chirala | Amanchi Krishna Mohan | IND | 57,544 | 37.20 | Pothula Suneetha | TDP | 47,209 | 30.52 | 10,335 | |
| Prakasam | 226 | Santhanuthalapadu (SC) | Audimulapu Suresh | YSRCP | 80,954 | 48.22 | B. N. Vijay Kumar | TDP | 79,678 | 47.46 | 1,276 | |
| Prakasam | 227 | Ongole | Damacharla Janardhana Rao | TDP | 93,025 | 51.29 | Balineni Srinivasa Reddy | YSRCP | 80,597 | 44.44 | 12,428 | |
| Prakasam | 228 | Kandukur | Pothula Ramarao | YSRCP | 84,538 | 48.83 | Divi Siva Ram | TDP | 80,732 | 46.64 | 3,806 | |
| Prakasam | 229 | Kondapi (SC) | D. S. B. Veeranjaneya Swamy | TDP | 92,234 | 50.33 | Jupudi Prabhakara Rao | YSRCP | 86,794 | 47.36 | 5,440 | |
| Prakasam | 230 | Markapuram | Janke Venkata Reddy | YSRCP | 82,411 | 50.77 | Kandula Narayana Reddy | TDP | 72,609 | 44.73 | 9,802 | |
| Prakasam | 231 | Giddalur | Muthumula Ashok Reddy | YSRCP | 94,413 | 51.85 | Anna Rambabu | TDP | 81,520 | 44.77 | 12,893 | |
| Prakasam | 232 | Kanigiri | Kadiri Baburao | TDP | 79,492 | 50.00 | Burra Madhu Sudhan Yadav | YSRCP | 72,285 | 45.47 | 7,207 | |
| Nellore | 233 | Kavali | Ramireddy Pratap Kumar Reddy | YSRCP | 89,589 | 48.97 | Beeda Masthan Rao | TDP | 84,620 | 46.26 | 4,969 | |
| Nellore | 234 | Atmakur | Mekapati Goutham Reddy | YSRCP | 91,686 | 55.98 | Guturu Murali Kanna Babu | TDP | 60,274 | 36.80 | 31,412 | |
| Nellore | 235 | Kovur | Polamreddy Srinivasulu Reddy | TDP | 94,108 | 48.52 | Nallapareddy Prasanna Kumar Reddy | YSRCP | 86,171 | 44.43 | 7,937 | |
| Nellore | 236 | Nellore City | Anil Kumar Poluboina | YSRCP | 74,372 | 53.01 | M. Sridhara Krishna Reddy | TDP | 55,285 | 39.40 | 19,087 | |
| Nellore | 237 | Nellore Rural | Kotamreddy Sridhar Reddy | YSRCP | 79,103 | 49.94 | Sannapureddy Suresh Reddy | BJP | 53,450 | 33.74 | 25,653 | |
| Nellore | 238 | Sarvepalli | Kakani Govardhan Reddy | YSRCP | 85,744 | 49.43 | S. Chandra Mohan Reddy | TDP | 80,298 | 46.29 | 5,446 | |
| Nellore | 239 | Gudur (SC) | Pasim Sunil Kumar | YSRCP | 80,698 | 48.01 | Bathala Radha Jyothsna Latha | TDP | 71,650 | 42.63 | 9,048 | |
| Nellore | 240 | Sullurpeta (SC) | Kiliveti Sanjeevaiah | YSRCP | 85,343 | 48.10 | Parasa Venkata Rathnaiah | TDP | 81,617 | 46.00 | 3,726 | |
| Nellore | 241 | Venkatagiri | Kurugondla Ramakrishna | TDP | 83,669 | 47.43 | Kommi Lakshmaiah Naidu | YSRCP | 78,034 | 44.23 | 5,635 | |
| Nellore | 242 | Udayagiri | Bollineni Venkata Ramarao | TDP | 85,873 | 48.93 | M. Chandra Sekhar Reddy | YSRCP | 82,251 | 46.86 | 3,622 | |
| Kadapa | 243 | Badvel (SC) | Thiriveedi Jayaramulu | YSRCP | 78,879 | 50.66 | N. D. Vijaya Jyothi | TDP | 68,800 | 44.18 | 10,079 | |
| Kadapa | 244 | Rajampet | M. V. Mallikarjuna Reddy | TDP | 83,884 | 50.74 | Akepati Amarnath Reddy | YSRCP | 72,267 | 43.71 | 11,617 | |
| Kadapa | 245 | Kadapa | Amzath Basha Shaik Bepari | YSRCP | 95,077 | 58.59 | Durgaprasad Rao Sudha | TDP | 49,872 | 30.73 | 45,205 | |
| Kadapa | 246 | Kodur (SC) | Koramutla Sreenivasulu | YSRCP | 66,820 | 48.72 | Obili Subbaramaiah | TDP | 64,848 | 47.29 | 1,972 | |
| Kadapa | 247 | Rayachoti | Gadikota Srikanth Reddy | YSRCP | 96,891 | 56.39 | R. Ramesh Kumar Reddy | TDP | 62,109 | 36.15 | 34,782 | |
| Kadapa | 248 | Pulivendula | Y. S. Jaganmohan Reddy | YSRCP | 124,576 | 68.67 | Singareddy Satish Reddy | TDP | 49,333 | 27.19 | 75,243 | |
| Kadapa | 249 | Kamalapuram | Pochimareddy Ravindranath Reddy | YSRCP | 78,547 | 49.78 | Putha Narasimha Reddy | TDP | 73,202 | 46.39 | 5,345 | |
| Kadapa | 250 | Jammalamadugu | C. Adinarayana Reddy | YSRCP | 100,794 | 51.32 | P. Rama Subba Reddy | TDP | 88,627 | 45.12 | 12,167 | |
| Kadapa | 251 | Proddatur | Rachamallu Siva Prasad Reddy | YSRCP | 93,866 | 51.40 | Nandyala Varada Rajulu Reddy | TDP | 80,921 | 44.32 | 12,945 | |
| Kadapa | 252 | Mydukur | Settipalli Raghurami Reddy | YSRCP | 85,539 | 51.97 | Putta Sudhakar Yadav | TDP | 74,017 | 44.97 | 11,522 | |
| Kurnool | 253 | Allagadda | Bhuma Shobha Nagi Reddy | YSRCP | 92,108 | 53.16 | Gangula Prabhakara Reddy | TDP | 74,180 | 42.81 | 17,928 | |
| Kurnool | 254 | Srisailam | Budda Rajasekhar Reddy | YSRCP | 74,249 | 50.09 | Silpa Chakrapani Reddy | TDP | 69,388 | 46.81 | 4,861 | |
| Kurnool | 255 | Nandikotkur (SC) | Isaiah Yakkaladevi | YSRCP | 87,496 | 54.68 | Labbi Venkata Swamy | TDP | 65,682 | 41.05 | 21,814 | |
| Kurnool | 256 | Kurnool | S. V. Mohan Reddy | YSRCP | 57,962 | 40.18 | T. G. Venkatesh | TDP | 54,483 | 37.77 | 3,479 | |
| Kurnool | 257 | Panyam | Gowru Charitha Reddy | YSRCP | 72,245 | 35.76 | Katasani Rambhupal Reddy | IND | 60,598 | 29.99 | 11,647 | |
| Kurnool | 258 | Nandyal | Bhuma Nagi Reddy | YSRCP | 82,194 | 46.97 | Silpa Mohan Reddy | TDP | 78,590 | 44.91 | 3,604 | |
| Kurnool | 259 | Banaganapalle | B. C. Janardhan Reddy | TDP | 95,727 | 53.31 | Katasani Rami Reddy | YSRCP | 78,386 | 43.65 | 17,341 | |
| Kurnool | 260 | Dhone | Buggana Rajendranath | YSRCP | 83,683 | 49.86 | K. E. Prathap | TDP | 72,531 | 43.21 | 11,152 | |
| Kurnool | 261 | Pattikonda | K. E. Krishnamurthy | TDP | 62,706 | 39.83 | Kotla Hari Chakrapani Reddy | YSRCP | 54,807 | 34.81 | 7,899 | |
| Kurnool | 262 | Kodumur (SC) | M. Mani Gandhi | YSRCP | 84,206 | 55.30 | Madharapu Renuka | BJP | 31,822 | 20.90 | 52,384 | |
| Kurnool | 263 | Yemmiganur | Jaya Nageswara Reddy | TDP | 84,483 | 50.67 | K. Jagan Mohan Reddy | YSRCP | 70,122 | 42.05 | 14,361 | |
| Kurnool | 264 | Mantralayam | Y. Balanagi Reddy | YSRCP | 69,858 | 49.73 | Palakurthi Thikka Reddy | TDP | 62,396 | 44.42 | 7,462 | |
| Kurnool | 265 | Adoni | Y. Sai Prasad Reddy | YSRCP | 72,121 | 51.97 | Konka Meenakshi Naidu | TDP | 55,290 | 39.84 | 16,831 | |
| Kurnool | 266 | Alur | Gummanur Jayaram | YSRCP | 69,466 | 41.66 | B. Veerabhadra Gowd | TDP | 67,547 | 40.51 | 1,919 | |
| Anantapur | 267 | Rayadurg | Kalava Srinivasulu | TDP | 92,344 | 47.91 | Kapu Ramachandra Reddy | YSRCP | 90,517 | 46.96 | 1,827 | |
| Anantapur | 268 | Uravakonda | Y. Visweswara Reddy | YSRCP | 81,042 | 48.80 | Payyavula Keshav | TDP | 78,767 | 47.43 | 2,275 | |
| Anantapur | 269 | Guntakal | R. Jitendra Gowd | TDP | 81,655 | 47.24 | Y. Venkatarami Reddy | YSRCP | 76,561 | 44.29 | 5,094 | |
| Anantapur | 270 | Tadpatri | J. C. Prabhakar Reddy | TDP | 96,740 | 53.76 | V. R. Rami Reddy | YSRCP | 74,568 | 41.44 | 22,172 | |
| Anantapur | 271 | Singanamala (SC) | B. Yamini Bala | TDP | 86,679 | 48.94 | Jonnalagadda Padmavathy | YSRCP | 82,095 | 46.35 | 4,584 | |
| Anantapur | 272 | Anantapur Urban | V. Prabhakar Chowdary | TDP | 74,704 | 48.07 | B. Gurunatha Reddy | YSRCP | 65,370 | 42.06 | 9,334 | |
| Anantapur | 273 | Kalyandurg | Hanumantharaya Chowdary | TDP | 91981 | 54.73 | Boya Thippe Swamy | YSRCP | 69,662 | 41.45 | 22,319 | |
| Anantapur | 274 | Raptadu | Paritala Sunitha | TDP | 91,394 | 50.79 | Thopudurthi Prakash Reddy | YSRCP | 83,620 | 46.47 | 7,774 | |
| Anantapur | 275 | Madakasira (SC) | K. Eranna | TDP | 76,741 | 48.53 | M. Thippeswamy | YSRCP | 62,029 | 39.22 | 14,712 | |
| Anantapur | 276 | Hindupur | Nandamuri Balakrishna | TDP | 81,543 | 51.12 | B. Naveen Nischal | YSRCP | 65,347 | 40.97 | 16,196 | |
| Anantapur | 277 | Penukonda | B. K. Parthasarathi | TDP | 79,793 | 47.46 | Malagundla Sankaranarayana | YSRCP | 62,378 | 37.11 | 17,415 | |
| Anantapur | 278 | Puttaparthi | Palle Raghunatha Reddy | TDP | 76,910 | 50.30 | C. Somasekhara Reddy | YSRCP | 69,946 | 45.75 | 6,964 | |
| Anantapur | 279 | Dharmavaram | Gonuguntla Suryanarayana | TDP | 99,246 | 52.14 | Kethireddy Venkatarami Reddy | YSRCP | 85,035 | 44.68 | 14,211 | |
| Anantapur | 280 | Kadiri | Attar Chand Basha | YSRCP | 81,639 | 48.29 | Kandikunta Venkata Prasad | TDP | 80,671 | 47.72 | 968 | |
| Chittoor | 281 | Thamballapalle | G. Shankar Yadav | TDP | 82,090 | 50.40 | A. V. Praveen Kumar Reddy | YSRCP | 72,900 | 44.76 | 9,190 | |
| Chittoor | 282 | Pileru | C. Ramachandra Reddy | YSRCP | 71,949 | 42.46 | N. Kishore Kumar Reddy | JSP | 56,636 | 33.42 | 15,313 | |
| Chittoor | 283 | Madanapalle | Desai Thippa Reddy | YSRCP | 81,252 | 48.08 | C. Narasimha Reddy | BJP | 64,663 | 38.27 | 16,589 | |
| Chittoor | 284 | Punganur | P. Ramachandra Reddy | YSRCP | 104,587 | 56.47 | M. Venkataramana Raju | TDP | 72,856 | 39.34 | 31,731 | |
| Chittoor | 285 | Chandragiri | Chevireddy Bhaskar Reddy | YSRCP | 100,924 | 48.88 | Galla Aruna Kumari | TDP | 96,406 | 46.70 | 4,518 | |
| Chittoor | 286 | Tirupati | M. Venkataramana | TDP | 99,313 | 57.56 | Bhumana Karunakar Reddy | YSRCP | 57,774 | 33.49 | 41,539 | |
| Chittoor | 287 | Srikalahasti | Bojjala Gopala Krishna Reddy | TDP | 89,953 | 48.82 | Biyyapu Madhusudhan Reddy | YSRCP | 82,370 | 44.71 | 7,583 | |
| Chittoor | 288 | Satyavedu (SC) | Talari Aditya | TDP | 77,655 | 48.22 | Koneti Adimulam | YSRCP | 73,428 | 45.60 | 4,227 | |
| Chittoor | 289 | Nagari | R. K. Roja | YSRCP | 74,724 | 47.23 | G. M. Krishnama Naidu | TDP | 73,866 | 46.69 | 858 | |
| Chittoor | 290 | Gangadhara Nellore (SC) | K. Narayana Swamy | YSRCP | 84,538 | 54.32 | Gummadi Kuthuhalamma | TDP | 63,973 | 41.11 | 20,565 | |
| Chittoor | 291 | Chittoor | D. A. Sathya Prabha | TDP | 73,430 | 50.50 | Arani Srinivasulu | YSRCP | 66,631 | 45.82 | 6,799 | |
| Chittoor | 292 | Puthalapattu (SC) | M. Sunil Kumar | YSRCP | 83,200 | 48.75 | L. Lalitha Kumari | TDP | 82298 | 48.23 | 902 | |
| Chittoor | 293 | Palamaner | N. Amarnath Reddy | YSRCP | 96,541 | 48.86 | R. V. Subash Chandra Bose | TDP | 93,651 | 47.40 | 2,890 | |
| Chittoor | 294 | Kuppam | N. Chandrababu Naidu | TDP | 102,952 | 62.59 | K. Chandramouli | YSRCP | 55,831 | 33.94 | 47,121 | |

== Telangana Results ==
=== Vote share ===
Vote share by party
1. Telangana Rashtra Samithi (34.3%)
2. Indian National Congress (25.2%)
3. Telugu Desam Party (14.7%)
4. Bharatiya Janata Party (7.10%)
5. All India Majlis-e-Ittehadul Muslimeen (3.80%)
6. Others (14.9%)

=== Seat share ===
Seat share by party
1. Telangana Rashtra Samithi (52.9%)
2. Indian National Congress (17.6%)
3. Telugu Desam Party (12.6%)
4. All India Majlis-e-Ittehadul Muslimeen (5.88%)
5. Bharatiya Janata Party (4.20%)
6. Janata Dal (6.72%)

=== Results by party ===
| Alliance/Party | | Seats won |
|---|---|---|
| Telangana Rashtra Samithi | | 63 |
| Indian National Congress | | 21 |
| NDA | Telugu Desam Party | 15 |
| NDA | Bharatiya Janata Party | 5 |
| NDA | Total | 20 |
| Majlis-e-Ittehadul Muslimeen | | 7 |
| YSR Congress Party | | 3 |
| Bahujan Samaj Party | | 2 |
| Communist Party of India (Marxist) | | 1 |
| Communist Party of India | | 1 |
| Independents | | 1 |
| Total | | 119 |

=== Results by district ===
| District | Seats | | | | | | |
| District | Seats | TRS | INC | TDP | MIM | BJP | OTH |
| Adilabad | 10 | 7 | 1 | —N/a | —N/a | —N/a | 2 |
| Nizamabad | 9 | 9 | —N/a | —N/a | —N/a | —N/a | —N/a |
| Karimnagar | 13 | 12 | 1 | —N/a | —N/a | —N/a | —N/a |
| Medak | 10 | 8 | 2 | —N/a | —N/a | —N/a | —N/a |
| Ranga Reddy | 14 | 4 | 2 | 7 | —N/a | 1 | —N/a |
| Hyderabad | 15 | 1 | —N/a | 3 | 7 | 4 | —N/a |
| Mahbubnagar | 14 | 7 | 5 | 2 | —N/a | —N/a | —N/a |
| Nalgonda | 12 | 6 | 5 | —N/a | —N/a | —N/a | 1 |
| Warangal | 12 | 8 | 1 | 2 | —N/a | —N/a | 1 |
| Khammam | 10 | 1 | 4 | 1 | —N/a | —N/a | 4 |
| Total | 119 | 63 | 21 | 15 | 7 | 5 | 8 |

=== Results by Vote Percentage ===
| District | Seats | | | | | | | | | | | | |
| District | Seats | TRS | | INC+CPI | | TDP+BJP | | YSRCP | | AIMIM | | Others | |
| District | Seats | Seats | Vote (%) | Seats | Vote (%) | Seats | Vote (%) | Seats | Vote (%) | Seats | Vote (%) | Seats | Vote (%) |
| Adilabad | 10 | 7 | 42.88% | 1 | 24.78% | 0 | 16.27% | 0 | 0.45% | 0 | 0.00% | 2 | 15.62% |
| Nizamabad | 9 | 9 | 45.44% | 0 | 30.35% | 0 | 14.09% | 0 | 0.65% | 0 | 2.39% | 0 | 7.07% |
| Karimnagar | 13 | 12 | 48.28% | 1 | 25.72% | 0 | 13.31% | 0 | 0.37% | 0 | 0.00% | 0 | 12.32% |
| Medak | 10 | 8 | 47.22% | 2 | 30.04% | 0 | 15.34% | 0 | 1.23% | 0 | 0.24% | 0 | 5.93% |
| Ranga Reddy | 14 | 4 | 28.88% | 2 | 22.81% | 8 | 30.83% | 0 | 4.97% | 0 | 2.88% | 0 | 9.63% |
| Hyderabad | 15 | 1 | 13.58% | 0 | 12.45% | 7 | 33.10% | 0 | 3.92% | 7 | 28.76% | 0 | 8.19% |
| Mahbubnagar | 14 | 7 | 36.06% | 5 | 32.99% | 2 | 20.07% | 0 | 1.35% | 0 | 0.00% | 0 | 9.52% |
| Nalgonda | 12 | 6 | 30.50% | 6 | 33.09% | 0 | 17.95% | 0 | 2.23% | 0 | 0.04% | 0 | 16.19% |
| Warangal | 12 | 8 | 44.94% | 1 | 26.28% | 2 | 17.44% | 0 | 0.34% | 0 | 0.00% | 1 | 11.00% |
| Khammam | 10 | 1 | 9.51% | 4 | 23.50% | 1 | 29.15% | 3 | 18.16% | 0 | 0.00% | 1 | 19.68% |
| Total | 119 | 63 | 34.04% | 22 | 25.91% | 20 | 21.58% | 3 | 3.36% | 7 | 3.74% | 4 | 11.37% |

=== Results by constituency ===
| District | Constituency | | Winner | | | | Runner Up | | | | Margin | |
| District | No. | Name | Candidate | Party | Votes | % | Candidate | Party | Votes | % | Margin | |
|---|---|---|---|---|---|---|---|---|---|---|---|---|
| Adilabad | 1 | Sirpur | Koneru Konappa | BSP | 49,033 | 32.41 | Kaveti Sammaiah | TRS | 40,196 | 26.57 | Margin | 8,837 |
| Adilabad | 2 | Chennur (SC) | Nallala Odelu | TRS | 64,867 | 50.79 | Gaddam Vinod Kumar | INC | 38,703 | 30.30 | 26,164 | |
| Adilabad | 3 | Bellampalli (SC) | Durgam Chinnaiah | TRS | 73,779 | 61.76 | Gunda Mallesh | CPI | 21,251 | 17.79 | 52,528 | |
| Adilabad | 4 | Mancherial | Diwakar Rao Nadipelli | TRS | 95,171 | 61.62 | Gaddam Aravinda Reddy | INC | 35,921 | 23.26 | 59,250 | |
| Adilabad | 5 | Asifabad (ST) | Kova Laxmi | TRS | 59,094 | 40.35 | Atram Sakku | INC | 40,039 | 27.34 | 19,055 | |
| Adilabad | 6 | Khanapur (ST) | Ajmeera Rekha | TRS | 67,442 | 49.33 | Rathod Ritesh | TDP | 28,931 | 21.16 | 38,511 | |
| Adilabad | 7 | Adilabad | Jogu Ramanna | TRS | 58,705 | 40.92 | Payal Shankar | BJP | 43,994 | 30.66 | 14,711 | |
| Adilabad | 8 | Boath (ST) | Rathod Bapu Rao | TRS | 62,870 | 45.39 | Anil Jadhav | INC | 35,877 | 25.90 | 26,993 | |
| Adilabad | 9 | Nirmal | Allola Indrakaran Reddy | BSP | 61,368 | 38.00 | Kuchadi Sriharirao | TRS | 52,871 | 32.73 | 8,497 | |
| Adilabad | 10 | Mudhole | Gaddigari Vittal Reddy | INC | 63,322 | 38.88 | Padakanti Ramadevi | BJP | 48,485 | 29.77 | 14,837 | |
| Nizamabad | 11 | Armur | Asannagari Jeevan Reddy | TRS | 67,555 | 49.74 | K. R. Suresh Reddy | INC | 53,591 | 39.46 | 13,964 | |
| Nizamabad | 12 | Bodhan | Shakil Aamir Mohammed | TRS | 67,427 | 44.02 | Sudarshan Reddy Podduturi | INC | 51,543 | 33.65 | 15,884 | |
| Nizamabad | 13 | Jukkal (SC) | Hanmanth Shinde | TRS | 72,901 | 51.63 | S. Gangaram | INC | 37,394 | 26.49 | 35,507 | |
| Nizamabad | 14 | Banswada | Pocharam Srinivas Reddy | TRS | 65,868 | 47.68 | Kasula Balaraju | INC | 41,938 | 30.36 | 23,930 | |
| Nizamabad | 15 | Yellareddy | Eanugu Ravinder Reddy | TRS | 70,760 | 44.78 | Jajala Surender | INC | 46,751 | 29.59 | 24,009 | |
| Nizamabad | 16 | Kamareddy | Gampa Govardhan | TRS | 71,961 | 45.53 | Mohammed Ali Shabbir | INC | 63,278 | 40.04 | 8,683 | |
| Nizamabad | 17 | Nizamabad Urban | Bigala Ganesh | TRS | 42,148 | 31.15 | Mir Majaz Ali Shaik | AIMIM | 31,840 | 23.53 | 10,308 | |
| Nizamabad | 18 | Nizamabad Rural | Bajireddy Goverdhan | TRS | 78,107 | 46.52 | Dharmapuri Srinivaas | INC | 51560 | 30.71 | 26,547 | |
| Nizamabad | 19 | Balkonda | Vemula Prashanth Reddy | TRS | 69,145 | 47.48 | Anil Kumar Eravathri | INC | 32,897 | 22.59 | 36,248 | |
| Karimnagar | 20 | Koratla | Kalvakuntla Vidya Sagar Rao | TRS | 58,890 | 39.10 | Juvvadi Narsinga Rao | IND | 38,305 | 25.43 | 20,585 | |
| Karimnagar | 21 | Jagital | Jeevan Reddy Thatiparthi | INC | 62,616 | 42.16 | M. Sanjay Kumar | TRS | 54,788 | 36.89 | 7,828 | |
| Karimnagar | 22 | Dharmapuri (SC) | Koppula Eshwar | TRS | 67,836 | 46.18 | Adluri Laxman Kumar | INC | 49,157 | 33.47 | 18,679 | |
| Karimnagar | 23 | Ramagundam | Somarapu Satyanarayana | TRS | 35,789 | 26.00 | Korukanti Chandar | AIFB | 33,494 | 24.33 | 2,295 | |
| Karimnagar | 24 | Manthani | Putta Madhukar | TRS | 84,037 | 49.38 | Sridhar Babu | INC | 64,677 | 38.00 | 19,360 | |
| Karimnagar | 25 | Peddapalle | Dasari Manohar Reddy | TRS | 96,220 | 57.33 | T. Bhanu Prasad Rao | INC | 33,543 | 19.99 | 62,677 | |
| Karimnagar | 26 | Karimnagar | Gangula Kamalakar | TRS | 77,209 | 40.92 | Bandi Sanjay Kumar | BJP | 52,455 | 27.80 | 24,754 | |
| Karimnagar | 27 | Choppadandi (SC) | Bodige Shobha | TRS | 86,841 | 58.13 | Suddala Devaiah | INC | 31,860 | 21.33 | 54,981 | |
| Karimnagar | 28 | Vemulawada | Chennamaneni Ramesh | TRS | 58,414 | 42.79 | Aadi Srinivas | BJP | 53,146 | 38.93 | 5,268 | |
| Karimnagar | 29 | Sircilla | K. T. Rama Rao | TRS | 92,135 | 58.36 | Konduru Ravinder Rao | INC | 39,131 | 24.79 | 53,004 | |
| Karimnagar | 30 | Manakondur (SC) | Rasamayi Balakishan | TRS | 85,010 | 54.20 | Arepalli Mohan | INC | 38,088 | 24.28 | 46,922 | |
| Karimnagar | 31 | Huzurabad | Etela Rajender | TRS | 95,315 | 58.76 | Kethiri Sudarshan Reddy | INC | 38,278 | 23.60 | 57,037 | |
| Karimnagar | 32 | Husnabad | Vodithela Sathish Kumar | TRS | 96,517 | 55.00 | Aligireddy Praveen Reddy | INC | 62,248 | 35.47 | 34,269 | |
| Medak | 33 | Siddipet | T. Harish Rao | TRS | 108,699 | 71.96 | Taduri Srinivas Goud | INC | 15,371 | 10.18 | 93,328 | |
| Medak | 34 | Medak | Padma Devender Reddy | TRS | 89,654 | 56.64 | Vijayashanti | INC | 50,054 | 31.62 | 39,600 | |
| Medak | 35 | Narayankhed | Patlolla Kishta Reddy | INC | 62,347 | 39.49 | Mahareddy Bhupal Reddy | TRS | 47,601 | 30.15 | 14,746 | |
| Medak | 36 | Andole (SC) | Babu Mohan | TRS | 87,087 | 48.18 | Damodar Raja Narasimha | INC | 83,796 | 46.36 | 3,291 | |
| Medak | 37 | Narsapur | Chilumula Madan Reddy | TRS | 85,890 | 49.00 | Vakiti Sunitha Laxma Reddy | INC | 71,673 | 40.89 | 14,217 | |
| Medak | 38 | Zahirabad (SC) | J. Geeta Reddy | INC | 57,558 | 34.68 | Koninty Manik Rao | TRS | 56,716 | 34.17 | 842 | |
| Medak | 39 | Sangareddy | Chinta Prabhakar | TRS | 82,860 | 52.63 | Turupu Jayaprakash Reddy | INC | 53,338 | 33.88 | 29,522 | |
| Medak | 40 | Patancheru | Gudem Mahipal Reddy | TRS | 73,986 | 37.06 | M. Sapanadev | TDP | 55,100 | 27.60 | 18,886 | |
| Medak | 41 | Dubbak | Solipeta Ramalinga Reddy | TRS | 82,231 | 53.37 | Cheruku Muthyam Reddy | INC | 44,306 | 28.75 | 37,925 | |
| Medak | 42 | Gajwel | K. Chandrashekar Rao | TRS | 86,694 | 44.06 | Vanteru Pratap Reddy | TDP | 67,303 | 34.21 | 19,391 | |
| Ranga Reddy | 43 | Medchal | Malipedhi Sudheer Reddy | TRS | 114,235 | 43.41 | Thotakura Jangaiah Yadav | TDP | 70,780 | 26.90 | 43,455 | |
| Ranga Reddy | 44 | Malkajgiri | C. Kanaka Reddy | TRS | 77,132 | 33.42 | Naraparaju Ramchander Rao | BJP | 74,364 | 32.22 | 2,768 | |
| Ranga Reddy | 45 | Quthbullapur | K. P. Vivekanand Goud | TDP | 11,4363 | 39.38 | K. Hanmanth Reddy | TRS | 75,339 | 25.94 | 39,024 | |
| Ranga Reddy | 46 | Kukatpally | Madhavaram Krishna Rao | TDP | 99,874 | 43.00 | G. Padma Rao | TRS | 56,688 | 24.41 | 43,186 | |
| Ranga Reddy | 47 | Uppal | N. V. S. S. Prabhakar | BJP | 82,395 | 36.47 | Bethi Subhas Reddy | TRS | 68,226 | 30.20 | 14,169 | |
| Ranga Reddy | 48 | Ibrahimpatnam | Manchireddy Kishan Reddy | TDP | 48,397 | 26.67 | Malreddy Ramreddy | IND | 37,341 | 20.58 | 11,056 | |
| Ranga Reddy | 49 | L. B. Nagar | R. Krishnaiah | TDP | 84,316 | 33.61 | Muddagowni Ram Mohan Goud | TRS | 71,791 | 28.62 | 12,525 | |
| Ranga Reddy | 50 | Maheshwaram | Teegala Krishna Reddy | TDP | 93,305 | 42.86 | Malreddy Ranga Reddy | INC | 62,521 | 28.72 | 30,784 | |
| Ranga Reddy | 51 | Rajendranagar | T. Prakash Goud | TDP | 77,843 | 33.91 | B. Gnaneshwar | INC | 51,962 | 22.63 | 25,881 | |
| Ranga Reddy | 52 | Serilingampally | Arekapudi Gandhi | TDP | 129,796 | 45.87 | Komaragoni Shanker | TRS | 53,539 | 18.92 | 76,257 | |
| Ranga Reddy | 53 | Chevella (SC) | Kale Yadaiah | INC | 64,182 | 39.48 | K. S. Ratnam | TRS | 63,401 | 39.00 | 781 | |
| Ranga Reddy | 54 | Pargi | T. Ram Mohan Reddy | INC | 68,098 | 45.34 | K. Harishwar Reddy | TRS | 62,935 | 41.91 | 5,163 | |
| Ranga Reddy | 55 | Vikarabad (SC) | B. Sanjeeva Rao | TRS | 64,592 | 46.84 | G. Prasad Kumar | INC | 54,520 | 39.54 | 10,072 | |
| Ranga Reddy | 56 | Tandur | P. Mahender Reddy | TRS | 61,293 | 45.97 | Malkud Narayan Rao | INC | 45,219 | 33.92 | 16,074 | |
| Hyderabad | 57 | Musheerabad | K. Laxman | BJP | 65,209 | 43.22 | Muta Gopal | TRS | 37,823 | 25.07 | 27,386 | |
| Hyderabad | 58 | Malakpet | Ahmed Bin Abdullah Balala | AIMIM | 58,976 | 47.24 | B. Venkat Reddy | BJP | 35,713 | 28.61 | 23,263 | |
| Hyderabad | 59 | Amberpet | G. Kishan Reddy | BJP | 81,430 | 55.70 | Aedla Sudhakar Reddy | TRS | 18,832 | 12.88 | 62,598 | |
| Hyderabad | 60 | Khairatabad | Chintala Ramachandra Reddy | BJP | 53,102 | 36.91 | Danam Nagender | INC | 32,256 | 22.42 | 20,846 | |
| Hyderabad | 61 | Jubilee Hills | Maganti Gopinath | TDP | 50,898 | 30.78 | V. Naveen Yadav | AIMIM | 41,656 | 25.19 | 9,242 | |
| Hyderabad | 62 | Sanathnagar | Talasani Srinivas Yadav | TDP | 56,475 | 45.27 | Dande Vittal | TRS | 29,014 | 23.26 | 27,461 | |
| Hyderabad | 63 | Nampally | Jaffer Hussain | AIMIM | 64,066 | 47.48 | Mohammed Feroz Khan | TDP | 46,356 | 34.35 | 17,710 | |
| Hyderabad | 64 | Karwan | Kausar Mohiuddin | AIMIM | 86,391 | 53.95 | Baddam Bal Reddy | BJP | 48,614 | 30.36 | 37,777 | |
| Hyderabad | 65 | Goshamahal | T. Raja Singh | BJP | 92,757 | 58.51 | Mukesh Goud | INC | 45,964 | 28.99 | 46,793 | |
| Hyderabad | 66 | Charminar | Syed Ahmed Pasha Quadri | AIMIM | 62,941 | 57.11 | M. A. Basith | TDP | 26,326 | 23.89 | 36,615 | |
| Hyderabad | 67 | Chandrayangutta | Akbaruddin Owaisi | AIMIM | 80,393 | 59.19 | Khayam Khan | MBT | 21,119 | 15.55 | 59,274 | |
| Hyderabad | 68 | Yakutpura | Mumtaz Ahmed Khan | AIMIM | 66,843 | 45.84 | Chermani Roop Raj | BJP | 32,420 | 22.23 | 34,423 | |
| Hyderabad | 69 | Bahadurpura | Mohammad Moazam Khan | AIMIM | 106,874 | 78.46 | Mohammed Abdul Rahman | TDP | 11,829 | 8.68 | 95,045 | |
| Hyderabad | 70 | Secunderabad | T. Padma Rao Goud | TRS | 57,920 | 42.40 | Kuna Venkatesh Goud | TDP | 31,941 | 23.38 | 25,979 | |
| Hyderabad | 71 | Secunderabad Cantt. (SC) | G. Sayanna | TDP | 44,693 | 35.50 | Gajjela Nagesh | TRS | 41,418 | 32.90 | 3,275 | |
| Mahbubnagar | 72 | Kodangal | Revanth Reddy | TDP | 54,026 | 39.06 | Gurunath Reddy | TRS | 39,412 | 28.50 | 14,614 | |
| Mahbubnagar | 73 | Narayanpet | S. Rajender Reddy | TDP | 40,107 | 29.37 | K. Shivakumar Reddy | TRS | 37,837 | 27.71 | 2,270 | |
| Mahbubnagar | 74 | Mahbubnagar | V. Srinivas Goud | TRS | 45,447 | 30.67 | Yennam Srinivas Reddy | BJP | 42,308 | 28.55 | 3,139 | |
| Mahbubnagar | 75 | Jadcherla | C. Laxma Reddy | TRS | 70,654 | 48.27 | Mallu Ravi | INC | 55,920 | 38.21 | 14,734 | |
| Mahbubnagar | 76 | Devarkadra | Alla Venkateshwar Reddy | TRS | 66,354 | 44.23 | Pavan Kumar | INC | 49,432 | 32.95 | 16,922 | |
| Mahbubnagar | 77 | Makthal | Chittem Rammohan Reddy | INC | 51,632 | 36.45 | Yelkoti Yella Reddy | TRS | 41,605 | 29.38 | 10,027 | |
| Mahbubnagar | 78 | Wanaparthy | G. Chinna Reddy | INC | 59,543 | 35.38 | Singireddy Niranjan Reddy | TRS | 55,252 | 32.83 | 4,291 | |
| Mahbubnagar | 79 | Gadwal | D. K. Aruna | INC | 83,355 | 48.54 | Bandla Krishna Mohan Reddy | TRS | 75,095 | 43.73 | 8,260 | |
| Mahbubnagar | 80 | Alampur (SC) | S. A. Sampath Kumar | INC | 57,419 | 36.26 | V. M. Abraham | TDP | 50,689 | 32.01 | 6,730 | |
| Mahbubnagar | 81 | Nagarkurnool | Marri Janardhan Reddy | TRS | 62,470 | 41.34 | Kuchakulla Damodar Reddy | INC | 48,035 | 31.79 | 14,435 | |
| Mahbubnagar | 82 | Achampet (SC) | Guvvala Balaraju | TRS | 62,584 | 42.68 | Chikkudu Vamshi Krishna | INC | 50,764 | 34.62 | 11,820 | |
| Mahbubnagar | 83 | Kalwakurthy | Challa Vamshi Chand Reddy | INC | 42,782 | 26.44 | Achary Talloju | BJP | 42,704 | 26.39 | 78 | |
| Mahbubnagar | 84 | Shadnagar | Anjaiah Yelganamoni | TRS | 70,315 | 45.37 | Chowlapally Pratap Reddy | INC | 52,987 | 34.19 | 17,328 | |
| Mahbubnagar | 85 | Kollapur | Jupally Krishna Rao | TRS | 72,741 | 46.86 | Beeram Harshavardhan Reddy | INC | 62,243 | 40.10 | 10,498 | |
| Nalgonda | 86 | Devarakonda (ST) | Ravindra Kumar Ramavath | CPI | 57,717 | 35.64 | Bheelya Naik Kethavath | TDP | 53,501 | 33.04 | 4,216 | |
| Nalgonda | 87 | Nagarjuna Sagar | Kunduru Jana Reddy | INC | 69,684 | 42.72 | Nomula Narsimhaiah Yadav | TRS | 53,208 | 32.62 | 16,476 | |
| Nalgonda | 88 | Miryalaguda | Nallamothu Bhaskar Rao | INC | 62,059 | 37.57 | Alugubelli Amarender Reddy | TRS | 56,005 | 33.90 | 6,054 | |
| Nalgonda | 89 | Huzurnagar | N. Uttam Kumar Reddy | INC | 69,879 | 38.94 | Kasoju Shankaramma | TRS | 45,955 | 25.61 | 23,924 | |
| Nalgonda | 90 | Kodad | N. Padmavathi Reddy | INC | 81,966 | 45.20 | Bollam Mallaiah Yadav | TDP | 68,592 | 37.83 | 13,374 | |
| Nalgonda | 91 | Suryapet | Guntakandla Jagadish Reddy | TRS | 43,554 | 25.22 | Sankineni Venkateshwer Rao | IND | 41,335 | 23.93 | 2,219 | |
| Nalgonda | 92 | Nalgonda | Komatireddy Venkat Reddy | INC | 60,774 | 36.57 | Kancharla Bhupal Reddy | TDP | 50,227 | 30.22 | 10,547 | |
| Nalgonda | 93 | Munugode | Kusukuntla Prabhakar Reddy | TRS | 65,496 | 38.13 | Palvai Sravanthi Reddy | IND | 27,441 | 15.97 | 38,055 | |
| Nalgonda | 94 | Bhongir | Pailla Shekar Reddy | TRS | 54,686 | 34.36 | Jitta Bala Krishna Reddy | Other | 39,270 | 24.67 | 15,416 | |
| Nalgonda | 95 | Nakrekal (SC) | Vemula Veeresham | TRS | 62,445 | 34.74 | Chirumarthi Lingaiah | INC | 60,075 | 33.42 | 23,70 | |
| Nalgonda | 96 | Thungathurthi (SC) | Gadari Kishore Kumar | TRS | 64,382 | 36.89 | Addanki Dayakar | INC | 62,003 | 35.53 | 23,79 | |
| Nalgonda | 97 | Alair | Gongidi Sunitha | TRS | 91,737 | 52.70 | Budida Bikshamaiah Goud | INC | 60,260 | 34.62 | 31,477 | |
| Warangal | 98 | Jangaon | Muthireddy Yadagiri Reddy | TRS | 84,074 | 48.80 | Ponnala Lakshmaiah | INC | 51,379 | 29.82 | 32,695 | |
| Warangal | 99 | Ghanpur Station (SC) | Thatikonda Rajaiah | TRS | 103,662 | 57.83 | Gunde Vijaya Rama Rao | INC | 44,833 | 25.01 | 58,829 | |
| Warangal | 100 | Palakurthi | Errabelli Dayakar Rao | TDP | 57,799 | 32.99 | Dugyala Shrinivas Rao | INC | 53,486 | 30.53 | 4,313 | |
| Warangal | 101 | Dornakal | Dharamsoth Redya Naik | INC | 84,170 | 51.11 | Satyavathi Rathod | TRS | 60,639 | 36.82 | 23,531 | |
| Warangal | 102 | Mahabubabad (ST) | Banoth Shankar Nayak | TRS | 78,370 | 44.78 | Kavitha Maloth | INC | 69,055 | 39.45 | 9,315 | |
| Warangal | 103 | Narsampet | Donthi Madhava Reddy | IND | 76,144 | 41.99 | Peddi Sudarshan Reddy | TRS | 57,768 | 31.86 | 18,376 | |
| Warangal | 104 | Parkal | Challa Dharma Reddy | TDP | 67,432 | 41.06 | Sahoder Reddy Muddasani | TRS | 58,324 | 35.52 | 9,108 | |
| Warangal | 105 | Warangal West | Dasyam Vinay Bhasker | TRS | 83,492 | 59.31 | Swarna Errabelli | INC | 27,188 | 19.31 | 56,304 | |
| Warangal | 106 | Warangal East | Konda Surekha | TRS | 88,641 | 59.82 | Basavaraju Saraiah | INC | 33,556 | 22.65 | 55,085 | |
| Warangal | 107 | Waradhanapet (SC) | Aroori Ramesh | TRS | 117,708 | 66.15 | Kondeti Shridhar | INC | 30,825 | 17.32 | 86,883 | |
| Warangal | 108 | Bhupalpalle | S. Madhusudhana Chary | TRS | 65,113 | 34.34 | Gandra Venkata Ramana Reddy | INC | 57,899 | 30.54 | 7,214 | |
| Warangal | 109 | Mulug (ST) | Azmeera Chandulal | TRS | 58,325 | 38.16 | Podem Veeraiah | INC | 41,926 | 27.43 | 16,399 | |
| Khammam | 110 | Pinapaka (ST) | Payam Venkateswarlu | YSRCP | 42,475 | 31.53 | N. Shankar | INC | 28,410 | 21.09 | 14,065 | |
| Khammam | 111 | Yellandu (ST) | Koram Kanakaiah | INC | 44,945 | 29.82 | Haripriya Banoth | TDP | 33,438 | 22.18 | 11,507 | |
| Khammam | 112 | Khammam | Puvvada Ajay Kumar | INC | 70,465 | 37.91 | Thummala Nageswara Rao | TDP | 64,783 | 34.85 | 5,682 | |
| Khammam | 113 | Palair | Ramreddy Venkat Reddy | INC | 69,707 | 39.28 | Maddineni Swarna Kumari | TDP | 47,844 | 26.96 | 21,863 | |
| Khammam | 114 | Madhira (SC) | Mallu Bhatti Vikramarka | INC | 65,135 | 36.81 | Kamal Raju Lingala | CPI(M) | 52,806 | 29.84 | 12,329 | |
| Khammam | 115 | Wyra (ST) | Banoth Madanlal | YSRCP | 59,318 | 40.35 | Banoth Balaji | TDP | 48,735 | 33.15 | 10,583 | |
| Khammam | 116 | Sathupalli (SC) | Sandra Venkata Veeraiah | TDP | 75,490 | 39.68 | Matta Dayanand Vijay Kumar | YSRCP | 73,005 | 38.37 | 2,485 | |
| Khammam | 117 | Kothagudem | Jalagam Venkat Rao | TRS | 50,688 | 30.67 | Vanama Venkateswara Rao | YSRCP | 34,167 | 20.67 | 16,521 | |
| Khammam | 118 | Aswaraopeta (ST) | Thati Venkateswarlu | YSRCP | 49,546 | 34.49 | Mecha Nageswara Rao | TDP | 48,616 | 33.84 | 930 | |
| Khammam | 119 | Bhadrachalam (ST) | Sunnam Rajaiah | CPI(M) | 57,750 | 34.78 | K. P. R. K. Phaneeswaramma | TDP | 55,935 | 33.69 | 1,815 | |

== Bypolls ==
=== Andhra Pradesh ===
| District | Constituency | | Winner | | | | Runner Up | | | | Margin |
| District | No. | Name | Candidate | Party | Votes | % | Candidate | Party | Votes | % | Margin |
|---|---|---|---|---|---|---|---|---|---|---|---|
| Krishna | 202 | Nandigama (SC) | Tangirala Sowmya | TDP | 99,748 | 78.27 | Bodapati Babu Rao | INC | 24,921 | 19.55 | 74,827 |
| Krishna | 202 | Nandigama (SC) | Bypoll held on 13 September 2014 following the death of the incumbent member Tangirala Prabhakara Rao from Telugu Desam Party on 15 June 2014. | | | | | | | | |
| Kurnool | 253 | Allagadda | Bhuma Akhila Priya | YSRCP | Un-contested | | | | | | |
| Kurnool | 253 | Allagadda | Bypoll necessitated following the death of the incumbent member Bhuma Shobha Nagi Reddy from YSR Congress Party on 24 April 2014. | | | | | | | | |
| Chittoor | 286 | Tirupati | M. Suguna | TDP | 126,162 | 85.69 | R. Sreedevi | INC | 9,628 | 6.65 | 116,524 |
| Chittoor | 286 | Tirupati | Bypoll held on 13 February 2015 following the death of the incumbent member M. Venkataramana from Telugu Desam Party on 15 December 2014. | | | | | | | | |
| Kurnool | 258 | Nandyal | Bhuma Brahmananda Reddy | TDP | 97,075 | 56.05 | Silpa Mohan Reddy | YSRCP | 69,610 | 40.19 | 27,465 |
| Kurnool | 258 | Nandyal | Bypoll held on 23 August 2017 following the death of the incumbent member Bhuma Nagi Reddy from Telugu Desam Party on 12 March 2017. | | | | | | | | |

=== Telangana ===
| District | Constituency | | Winner | | | | Runner Up | | | | Margin |
| District | No. | Name | Candidate | Party | Votes | % | Candidate | Party | Votes | % | Margin |
|---|---|---|---|---|---|---|---|---|---|---|---|
| Medak | 35 | Narayankhed | Mahareddy Bhupal Reddy | TRS | 93,076 | 60.10 | Patlolla Sanjeeva Reddy | INC | 39,451 | 25.47 | 53,625 |
| Medak | 35 | Narayankhed | Bypoll held on 13 August 2016 following the death of the incumbent member Patlolla Kishta Reddy from Indian National Congress on 25 August 2015. | | | | | | | | |
| Khammam | 113 | Palair | Thummala Nageswara Rao | TRS | 94,940 | 55.50 | Ramreddy Sucharitha Reddy | INC | 49,258 | 28.80 | 45,682 |
| Khammam | 113 | Palair | Bypoll held on 16 May 2016 following the death of the incumbent member Ramreddy Venkat Reddy from Indian National Congress on 4 March 2016. | | | | | | | | |

== See also ==
- State Assembly elections in India, 2014
- List of constituencies of the Assembly of Andhra Pradesh
- 2014 Andhra Pradesh General Election
