= 2024 Indian general election in Andhra Pradesh =

Election for lower house of Indian Parliament

- 13 May 2024

All 25 Andhra Pradesh seats to the Lok Sabha
- Opinion polls
- Turnout: 81.78% (▲2.04 pp)
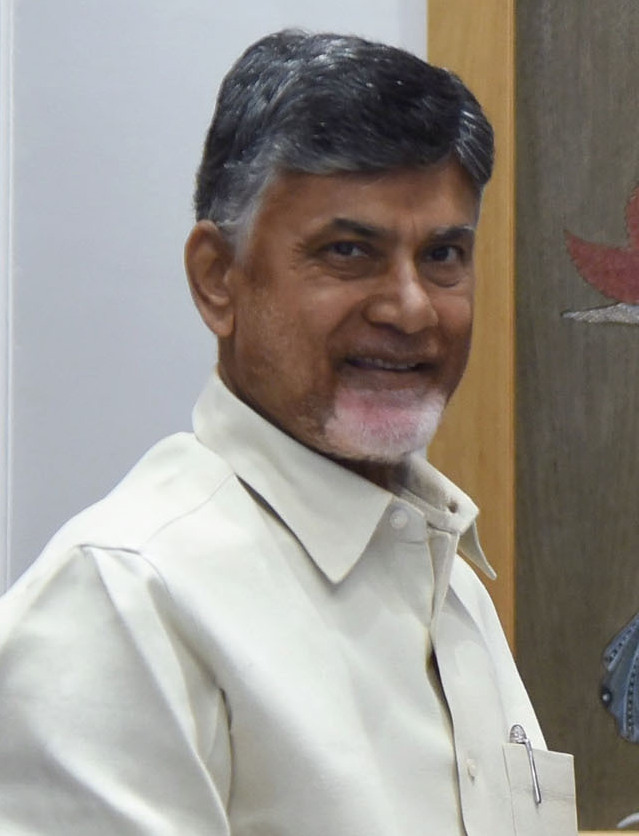

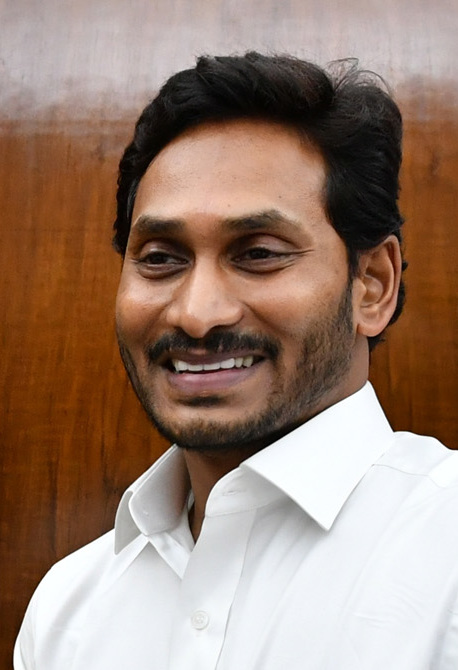

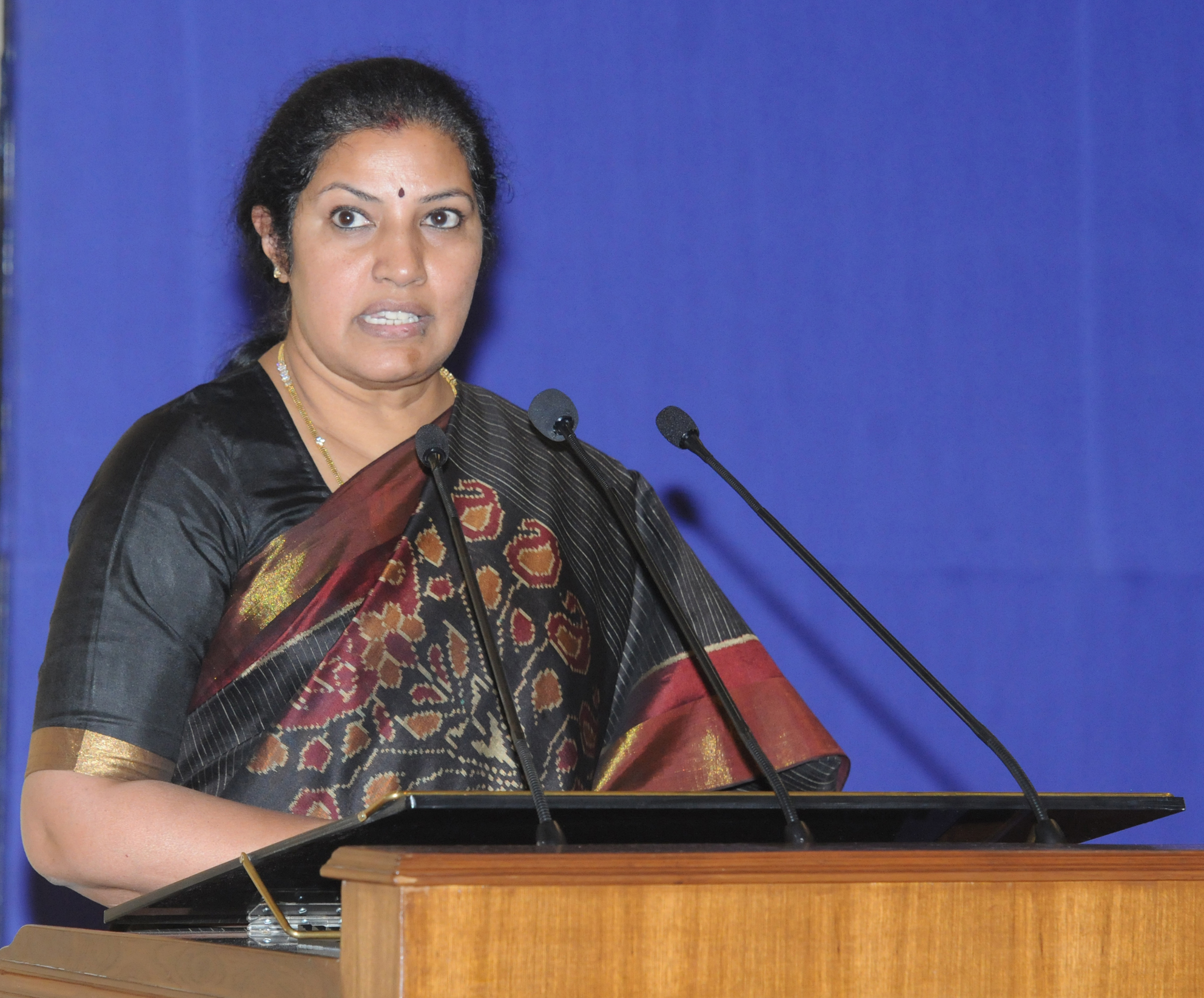

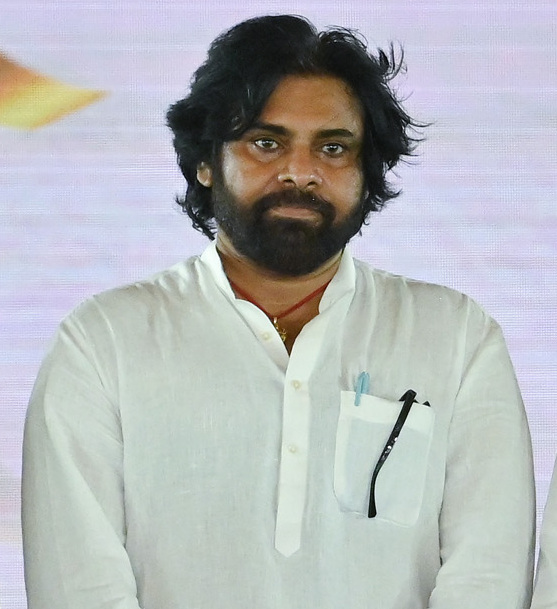
	First party	Second party
Leader	N. Chandrababu Naidu	Y. S. Jagan Mohan Reddy
Party	TDP	YSRCP
Alliance	NDA	–
Last election	40.19%, 3 seats	49.89%, 22 seats
Seats won	16	4
Seat change	▲13	▼18
Popular vote	12,569,179	13,174,874
Percentage	37.79%	39.61%
Swing	▼2.40 pp	▼10.28 pp
	Third party	Fourth party
Leader	Daggubati Purandeswari	Pawan Kalyan
Party	BJP	JSP
Alliance	NDA	NDA
Last election	0.98%, 0 seats	5.87%, 0 seats
Seats won	3	2
Seat change	▲3	▲2
Popular vote	3,750,687	1,454,138
Percentage	11.28%	4.30%
Swing	▲10.30 pp	▼1.57 pp
Prime Minister before election
Narendra Modi
BJP
Prime Minister after election
Narendra Modi
BJP

The 2024 Indian general election was held in Andhra Pradesh on 13 May 2024 to elect 25 members of the 18th Lok Sabha. Legislative assembly elections were held simultaneously with the general election.

== Election schedule ==
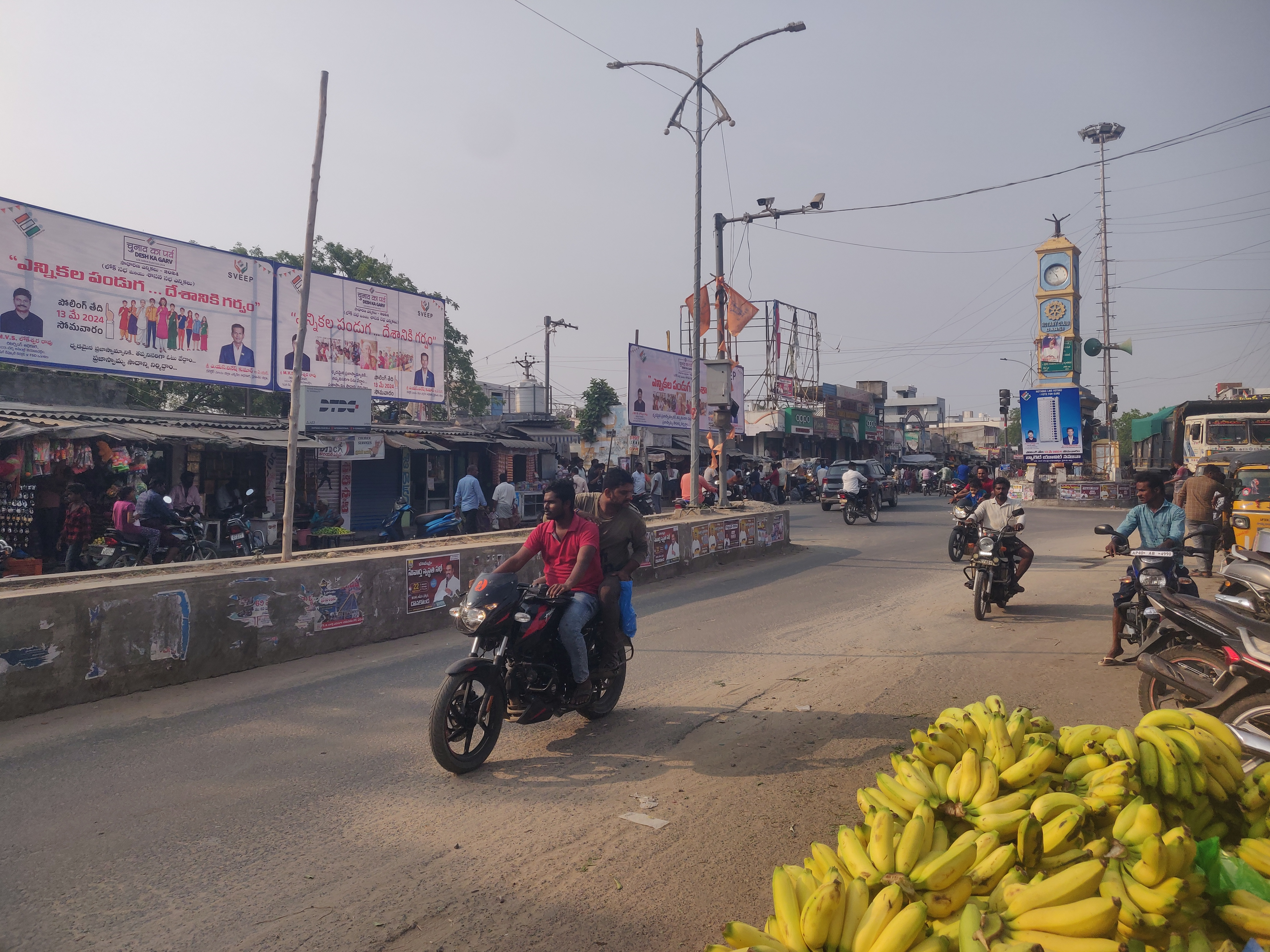
2024 election outdoor advertisements by Election Commission in Darsi

On 16 March 2024, the Election Commission of India announced the schedule for the 2024 Indian general election, with Andhra Pradesh scheduled to vote during the fourth phase on 13 May 2024.

Poll event	Phase
Poll event	IV
Notification date	18 April
Last date for filing nomination	25 April
Scrutiny of nomination	26 April
Last Date for withdrawal of nomination	29 April
Date of poll	13 May
Date of counting of votes/Result	4 June
No. of constituencies	25

== Parties and alliances ==
=== YSR Congress Party ===
YSR Congress Party

Party	Flag	Symbol	Leader	Seats contested
YSR Congress Party			Y. S. Jaganmohan Reddy	25

=== National Democratic Alliance ===
National Democratic Alliance

Party	Flag	Symbol	Leader	Seats contested
Telugu Desam Party			N. Chandrababu Naidu	17
Bharatiya Janata Party			Daggubati Purandeswari	6
Janasena Party			Pawan Kalyan	2
Total				25

=== Indian National Developmental Inclusive Alliance ===
Indian National Developmental Inclusive Alliance

Party	Flag	Symbol	Leader	Seats contested
Indian National Congress			Y. S. Sharmila	23
Communist Party of India (Marxist)			V. Srinivasa Rao	1
Communist Party of India			K. Ramakrishna	1
Total				25

== Candidates ==
Constituency		YSRCP		NDA		INDIA	
#	Name	Party	Candidate	Party	Candidate	Party	Candidate
1	Araku (ST)	YCP	Gumma Thanuja Rani	BJP	Kothapalli Geetha	CPI(M)	Appala Narsa
2	Srikakulam	YCP	Perada Tilak	TDP	Kinjarapu Ram Mohan Naidu	INC	Pedada Parameswara Rao
3	Vizianagaram	YCP	Bellana Chandra Sekhar	TDP	Kalisetti Appala Naidu	INC	Bobbili Srinu
4	Visakhapatnam	YCP	Botcha Jhansi Lakshmi	TDP	Mathukumilli Bharat	INC	Pulusu Satyanarayana Reddy
5	Anakapalli	YCP	Budi Mutyala Naidu	BJP	C. M. Ramesh	INC	Vegi Venkatesh
6	Kakinada	YCP	Chalamalasetti Sunil	JSP	Tangella Uday Srinivas	INC	M. M. Pallam Raju
7	Amalapuram (SC)	YCP	Rapaka Vara Prasada Rao	TDP	Ganti Harish Madhur	INC	Janga Goutham
8	Rajahmundry	YCP	Guduri Srinivas	BJP	Daggubati Purandeswari	INC	Gidugu Rudra Raju
9	Narasapuram	YCP	Guduri Umabala	BJP	Srinivas Verma	INC	Korlapati Brahmananda Rao Naidu
10	Eluru	YCP	Karumuri Sunil Kumar	TDP	Putta Mahesh Kumar	INC	Lavanya Kumari
11	Machilipatnam	YCP	Simhadri Chandrasekhar Rao	JSP	Vallabhaneni Balashowry	INC	Gollu Krishna
12	Vijayawada	YCP	Kesineni Srinivas	TDP	Kesineni Sivanath	INC	Valluru Bhargav
13	Guntur	YCP	Kilari Venkata Rosaiah	TDP	Chandra Sekhar Pemmasani	CPI	Jangala Ajay Kumar
14	Narasaraopet	YCP	Poluboina Anilkumar Yadav	TDP	Lavu Sri Krishna Devarayalu	INC	Garnepudi Alexander Sudhakar
15	Bapatla (SC)	YCP	Nandigam Suresh	TDP	Tenneti Krishna Prasad	INC	Jesudasu Seelam
16	Ongole	YCP	Chevireddy Bhaskar Reddy	TDP	Magunta Sreenivasulu Reddy	INC	Eda Sudhakara Reddy
17	Nandyal	YCP	Pocha Brahmananda Reddy	TDP	Byreddy Sabari	INC	Jangiti Lakshmi Narasimha Yadav
18	Kurnoolu	YCP	B. Y. Ramaiah	TDP	Panchalingala Nagaraju	INC	P. G. Ram Pullaiah Yadav
19	Anantapur	YCP	Malagundla Sankaranarayana	TDP	Ambika Lakshminarayana	INC	Mallikarjun Vajjala
20	Hindupur	YCP	J. Shantha	TDP	B. K. Parthasarathi	INC	B. A. Samad Shaheen
21	Kadapa	YCP	Y. S. Avinash Reddy	TDP	Chadipiralla Bhupesh Reddy	INC	Y. S. Sharmila
22	Nellore	YCP	V. Vijaysai Reddy	TDP	Vemireddy Prabhakar Reddy	INC	Koppula Raju
23	Tirupati (SC)	YCP	Maddila Gurumoorthy	BJP	Velagapalli Varaprasad Rao	INC	Chinta Mohan
24	Rajampet	YCP	P. V. Midhun Reddy	BJP	Kiran Kumar Reddy	INC	S K Basheed
25	Chittoor (SC)	YCP	N. Reddeppa	TDP	Daggumalla Prasada Rao	INC	M Jagapathi

== Campaign ==
2024 Election – Street campaign through song and dance by NDA in Guntur, Andhra Pradesh

According to an analysis, special category status for state, capital issue, Y. S. Vivekananda Reddy's murder, attack on Y. S. Jagan Mohan Reddy, and cases against N. Chandrababu Naidu are the key issues. Candidates are campaigning by interacting with common people and taking part in their work such as making tea, ironing clothes and weighing vegetables. Movies and songs to promote own political party denigrate other party leaders have become common by main parties in the state. The use of social media to amplify the reach of such content to the voter has become a core strategy of parties.

== Surveys and polls ==
=== Opinion polls ===
Polling agency	Date published	Margin of error						Lead
Polling agency	Date published	Margin of error	YSRCP	NDA		INDIA	Others	Lead
Polling agency	Date published	Margin of error	YSRCP	TDP+	BJP	INDIA	Others	Lead
ABP News-CVoter	April 2024	±5%	5	20		0	0	NDA
News 18	March 2024	±3%	7	18		0	0	NDA
ABP News-CVoter	March 2024	±5%	5	20		0	0	NDA
TDP+ joins NDA
India Today-CVoter	February 2024	±3–5%	8	17	0	0	0	TDP
Times Now-ETG	December 2023	±3%	24–25	0–1	0	0	0	YSRCP
India TV-CNX	October 2023	±3%	15	10	0	0	0	YSRCP
Times Now-ETG	September 2023	±3%	24–25	0–1	0	0	0	YSRCP
Times Now-ETG	August 2023	±3%	24–25	0–1	0	0	0	YSRCP

Polling agency	Date published	Margin of error						Lead
Polling agency	Date published	Margin of error	YSRCP	NDA		INDIA	Others	Lead
Polling agency	Date published	Margin of error	YSRCP	TDP+	BJP	INDIA	Others	Lead
ABP News-CVoter	April 2024	±5%	39.9%	46.7%		13.4%		6.8
News 18	March 2024	±3%	41%	50%		6%	3%	9
ABP News-CVoter	March 2024	±5%	42%	45%		3%	10%	3
TDP+ joins NDA
India Today-CVoter	February 2024	±3–5%	41%	45%	2%	3%	9%	4
Times Now-ETG	December 2023	±3%	50%	47%	1%	1%	1%	3
India TV-CNX	October 2023	±3–5%	46%	42%	2%	2%	8%	4
Times Now-ETG	September 2023	±3%	51.1%	36.4%	1.3%	1.1%	10.1%	14.7

=== Exit polls ===
Polling agency					Lead
Polling agency	NDA	YSRCP	INDIA	Others	Lead
ABP News-CVoter	21-25	0-4	0	0	NDA
India Today-Axis My India	21-23	2-4	0	0	NDA
India News-Dynamics	18	7	0	0	NDA
India TV-CNX	19-23	3-5	0	0	NDA
NDTV-Jan Ki Baat	10-14	8-13	0	0	NDA
CNN-CNBC-News 18	19-22	5-8	0	0	NDA
News 24-Today's Chanakya	22	3	0	0	NDA
News Nation	19	6	0	0	NDA
Republic TV-Matrize	19-22	3-6	0	0	NDA
Republic TV-PMarq	14	11	0	0	NDA
Times Now-ETG	11	14	0	0	YSRCP
TV9 Bharatvarsh- People's Insight - Polstrat	12	13	0	0	YSRCP
Times Now-NavBharat	10	15	0	0	YSRCP
DB Live	7-9	15-17	0-2	0	YSRCP
Actual results	21	4	0	0	NDA

== Voter turnout ==
Constituency		Poll date	Turnout	Swing
1	Araku (ST)	13 May 2024	73.68%	▲2.53
2	Srikakulam	13 May 2024	74.43%	▼0.05
3	Vizianagaram	13 May 2024	81.05%	▼0.23
4	Visakhapatnam	13 May 2024	71.11%	▲3.33
5	Anakapalli	13 May 2024	82.03%	▲0.49
6	Kakinada	13 May 2024	80.30%	▲1.22
7	Amalapuram (SC)	13 May 2024	83.85%	▼0.79
8	Rajahmundry	13 May 2024	80.93%	▼0.57
9	Narasapuram	13 May 2024	82.59%	▲0.69
10	Eluru	13 May 2024	83.68%	▲0.15
11	Machilipatnam	13 May 2024	84.05%	▼0.49
12	Vijayawada	13 May 2024	79.37%	▲2.07
13	Guntur	13 May 2024	78.81%	▼0.40
14	Narasaraopet	13 May 2024	85.65%	▼0.60
15	Bapatla (SC)	13 May 2024	85.48%	▼0.99
16	Ongole	13 May 2024	87.06%	▲0.71
17	Nandyal	13 May 2024	80.61%	▼0.46
18	Kurnool	13 May 2024	76.80%	▲1.11
19	Anantapur	13 May 2024	80.51%	▼0.50
20	Hindupur	13 May 2024	84.70%	▼0.21
21	Kadapa	13 May 2024	79.57%	▲0.89
22	Nellore	13 May 2024	79.05%	▲1.99
23	Tirupati (SC)	13 May 2024	79.10%	▼0.66
24	Rajampet	13 May 2024	79.09%	▼0.17
25	Chittoor (SC)	13 May 2024	85.77%	▲1.53

== Results ==
=== Results by alliance or party ===
Alliance/ Party		Popular vote			Seats		
Alliance/ Party		Votes	%	±pp	Contested	Won	+/−
NDA	TDP	12,569,179	37.79	▼2.40	17	16	▲13
NDA	BJP	3,750,687	11.28	▲10.30	6	3	▲3
NDA	JSP	1,454,138	4.30	▼1.57	2	2	▲2
NDA	Total	17,774,004	53.37	▲6.33	25	21	▲18
YSRCP		13,174,874	39.61	▼10.28	25	4	▼18
INDIA	INC	886,165	2.66	▲1.35	23	0	Steady
INDIA	CPI(M)	119,016	0.36	▲0.24	1	0	Steady
INDIA	CPI	8,317	0.03	▼0.06	1	0	Steady
INDIA	Total	1,013,498	3.05	▲1.53	25	0	Steady
Others					141	0	Steady
IND					199	0	Steady
NOTA		398,777	1.20	▼0.30			
Total			100%	-	454	25	-

=== Results by constituency ===
Constituency			Winner				Runner Up				Margin	%
#	Name	Poll %	Candidate	Party	Votes	%	Candidate	Party	Votes	%	Margin	%
1	Araku (ST)	74.87 ▲	Gumma Thanuja Rani	YCP	4,77,005	40.96	Kothapalli Geetha	BJP	4,26,425	36.62	50,580	4.34
2	Srikakulam	75.37 ▲	K. Ram Mohan Naidu	TDP	7,54,328	61.05	Perada Tilak	YCP	4,26,427	34.51	3,27,901	26.54
3	Vizianagaram	82.19 ▲	Appala Naidu Kalisetti	TDP	7,43,113	57.20	Bellana Chandra Sekhar	YCP	4,93,762	38.00	2,49,351	19.20
4	Visakhapatnam	72.03 ▲	Mathukumilli Bharat	TDP	9,07,467	65.42	Botcha Jhansi Lakshmi	YCP	4,03,220	29.07	5,04,247	36.35
5	Anakapalle	82.97 ▲	C. M. Ramesh	BJP	7,62,069	57.50	Budi Mutyala Naidu	YCP	4,65,539	35.13	2,96,530	22.37
6	Kakinada	81.43 ▲	Tangella Uday Srinivas	JSP	7,29,699	54.87	Chalamalasetti Sunil	YCP	5,00,208	37.62	2,29,491	17.25
7	Amalapuram (SC)	84.97 ▲	Ganti Harish Madhur	TDP	7,96,981	61.25	Rapaka Vara Prasada Rao	YCP	4,54,785	34.95	3,42,196	26.30
8	Rajahmundry	81.85 ▲	Daggubati Purandeswari	BJP	7,26,515	54.82	Guduri Srinivas	YCP	4,87,376	36.77	2,39,139	18.05
9	Narasapuram	83.63 ▲	Bhupathi Srinivasa Varma	BJP	7,07,343	57.46	Guduri Umabala	YCP	4,30,541	34.98	2,76,802	22.48
10	Eluru	84.73 ▲	Putta Mahesh Kumar	TDP	7,46,351	54.00	Karumuri Sunilkumar Yadav	YCP	5,64,494	40.84	1,81,857	13.16
11	Machilipatnam	85.42 ▲	Vallabhaneni Balashowry	JSP	7,24,439	55.22	Simhadri Chandrasekhar Rao	YCP	5,01,260	38.21	2,23,179	17.01
12	Vijayawada	80.44 ▲	Kesineni Sivanath	TDP	7,94,154	58.21	Kesineni Srinivas	YCP	5,12,069	37.53	2,82,085	20.68
13	Guntur	80.16 ▲	Chandra Sekhar Pemmasani	TDP	8,64,948	60.68	Kilari Venkata Rosaiah	YCP	5,20253	36.50	3,44,695	24.18
14	Narasaraopet	86.68 ▲	Lavu Sri Krishna Devarayalu	TDP	8,07,996	53.88	Poluboina Anilkumar Yadav	YCP	6,48,267	43.23	1,59,729	10.65
15	Bapatla (SC)	86.57 ▲	Krishna Prasad Tenneti	TDP	7,17,493	55.16	Nandigam Suresh	YCP	5,09,462	39.17	2,08,031	15.99
16	Ongole	88.32 ▲	Magunta S. Reddy	TDP	7,01,894	49.35	Chevireddy Bhaskar Reddy	YCP	6,51,695	45.82	50,199	3.53
17	Nandyal	81.82 ▲	Byreddy Shabari	TDP	7,01,131	49.92	Pocha Brahmananda Reddy	YCP	5,89,156	41.95	1,11,975	7.97
18	Kurnool	77.69 ▲	Bastipati Nagaraju	TDP	6,58,914	49.51	B. Y. Ramaiah	YCP	5,47,616	41.15	1,11,298	8.36
19	Anantapur	81.70 ▲	Ambika G. L Valmiki	TDP	7,68,245	53.33	M. Sankaranarayana	YCP	5,79,690	40.24	1,88,555	13.09
20	Hindupur	85.91 ▲	B. K. Parthasarathi	TDP	7,25,534	51.23	J. Shantha	YCP	5,93,107	41.88	1,32,427	9.35
21	Kadapa	80.89 ▲	Y. S. Avinash Reddy	YCP	6,05,143	45.78	Chadipiralla Bhupesh Reddy	TDP	5,42,448	41.03	62,695	4.75
22	Nellore	80.49 ▲	Vemireddy Prabhakar Reddy	TDP	7,66,202	55.70	V. Vijaysai Reddy	YCP	5,20,300	37.82	2,45,902	17.88
23	Tirupati (SC)	80.19 ▲	Maddila Gurumoorthy	YCP	6,32,228	45.73	Velagapalli Varaprasad Rao	BJP	6,17,659	44.67	14,569	1.06
24	Rajampet	80.24 ▲	P. V. Midhun Reddy	YCP	6,44,844	48.38	Kiran Kumar Reddy	BJP	5,68,773	42.67	76,071	5.71
25	Chittoor (SC)	86.76 ▲	Daggumalla Prasada Rao	TDP	7,78,071	54.84	N. Reddeppa	YCP	5,57,592	39.30	2,20,479	15.54

== Assembly segments-wise lead of parties ==
2024 Andhra Pradesh Lok Sabha Election Assembly Wise Lead Map

Party		Assembly segments	Current Position in the Assembly
NDA	TDP	113	135
NDA	BJP	29	8
NDA	JSP	14	21
NDA	Total	156	164
YSRCP		19	11
Total		175	

== Assembly Seat wise leads ==
Constituency		Winner			Runner-up			Margin
#	Name	Party	Votes	%	Party	Votes	%	Margin
Araku (ST)
10	Palakonda	BJP	66,695	46.92	YSRCP	63,302	44.53	3,393
11	Kurupam	BJP	64,778	44.06	YSRCP	61,917	42.12	2,861
12	Parvathipuram	BJP	74,704	51.80	YSRCP	60,813	42.17	13,891
13	Salur	BJP	69,166	46.12	YSRCP	68,643	45.77	523
28	Araku Valley	YSRCP	62,862	38.62	CPI(M)	45,109	27.71	17,753
29	Paderu	YSRCP	69,801	46.52	BJP	35,836	23.89	33,965
53	Rampachodavaram	YSRCP	84,132	42.78	BJP	76,110	38.70	8,022
Srikakulam
1	Ichchapuram	TDP	111,448	61.50	YSRCP	66,014	36.43	45,434
2	Palasa	TDP	104,496	65.32	YSRCP	52,253	32.66	52,243
3	Tekkali	TDP	108,170	59.20	YSRCP	71,328	39.04	36,842
4	Pathapatnam	TDP	92,730	59.19	YSRCP	58,625	37.42	34,105
5	Srikakulam	TDP	123,477	67.29	YSRCP	55,064	30.01	68,413
6	Amadalavalasa	TDP	90,690	59.83	YSRCP	56,143	37.04	34,547
8	Narasannapeta	TDP	103,490	61.32	YSRCP	60,967	36.13	42,523
Vizianagaram
7	Etcherla	TDP	110,442	55.71	YSRCP	81,533	41.12	28,909
9	Rajam	TDP	92,451	54.35	YSRCP	72,875	42.84	19,576
14	Bobbili	TDP	107,711	59.50	YSRCP	67,949	37.53	39,762
15	Cheepurupalle	TDP	87,384	51.98	YSRCP	75,008	44.62	12,376
16	Gajapathinagaram	TDP	100,099	58.31	YSRCP	66,458	38.72	33,641
17	Nellimarla	TDP	106,169	57.88	YSRCP	70,204	38.27	35,965
18	Vizianagaram	TDP	125,028	68.32	YSRCP	53,664	29.33	71,364
Visakhapatnam
19	Srungavarapukota	TDP	110,546	58.65	YSRCP	70,667	37.49	39,879
20	Bhimili	TDP	179,101	65.30	YSRCP	83,089	30.29	96,012
21	Visakhapatnam East	TDP	134,102	67.14	YSRCP	57,096	28.58	77,006
22	Visakhapatnam South	TDP	97,112	70.91	YSRCP	30,723	22.43	66,389
23	Visakhapatnam North	TDP	121,507	65.96	YSRCP	52,405	28.45	69,102
24	Visakhapatnam West	TDP	96,133	64.68	YSRCP	45,366	30.52	50,767
25	Gajuwaka	TDP	155,383	67.76	YSRCP	58,475	25.50	96,908
Anakapalli
26	Chodavaram	BJP	102,363	57.52	YSRCP	67,369	37.86	34,994
27	Madugula	BJP	87,049	55.20	YSRCP	62,876	39.87	24,173
30	Anakapalle	BJP	111,411	66.28	YSRCP	48,491	28.85	62,920
31	Pendurthi	BJP	139,994	62.40	YSRCP	68,650	30.60	71,344
32	Yelamanchili	BJP	105,876	60.72	YSRCP	60,197	34.53	45,679
33	Payakaraopet	BJP	112,207	55.49	YSRCP	77,899	38.53	34,308
34	Narsipatnam	BJP	91,127	51.88	YSRCP	74,280	42.29	16,847
Kakinada
35	Tuni	JSP	87,028	47.34	YSRCP	83,303	45.31	3,725
36	Prathipadu	JSP	86,385	50.28	YSRCP	73,209	42.61	13,176
37	Pithapuram	JSP	123,223	60.84	YSRCP	69,821	34.47	53,402
38	Kakinada Rural	JSP	125,526	62.79	YSRCP	64,042	32.04	61,484
39	Peddapuram	JSP	93,550	53.50	YSRCP	70,995	40.60	22,555
41	Kakinada City	JSP	103,138	59.72	YSRCP	55,882	32.36	47,256
52	Jaggampeta	JSP	100,121	52.70	YSRCP	77,936	41.02	22,185
Amalapuram (SC)
42	Ramachandrapuram	TDP	100,276	58.27	YSRCP	67,820	39.41	32,456
43	Mummidivaram	TDP	121,329	59.80	YSRCP	75,662	37.29	45,667
44	Amalapuram	TDP	110,309	63.54	YSRCP	58,691	33.80	51,618
45	Razole	TDP	96,623	62.48	YSRCP	52,150	33.72	44,473
46	Gannavaram (SC)	TDP	101,989	62.11	YSRCP	56,097	34.17	45,892
47	Kothapeta	TDP	134,769	63.02	YSRCP	74,858	35.00	59,911
48	Mandapeta	TDP	120,854	63.53	YSRCP	65,084	34.21	55,770
Rajahmundry
40	Anaparthy	BJP	107,752	56.45	YSRCP	77,984	40.86	29,768
49	Rajanagaram	BJP	97,157	52.40	YSRCP	66,977	36.12	30,180
50	Rajahmundry City	BJP	113,284	63.29	YSRCP	52,074	29.09	61,210
51	Rajahmundry Rural	BJP	117,625	59.93	YSRCP	66,556	33.91	51,069
54	Kovvur	BJP	83,627	54.14	YSRCP	61,834	40.03	21,793
55	Nidadavole	BJP	95,597	53.74	YSRCP	69,599	39.12	25,998
66	Gopalapuram	BJP	103,599	50.90	YSRCP	88,148	43.31	15,451
Narasapuram
56	Achanta	BJP	76,206	51.48	YSRCP	61,649	41.65	14,557
57	Palacole	BJP	98,308	61.46	YSRCP	51,093	31.94	47,215
58	Narasapuram	BJP	82,578	57.77	YSRCP	49,359	34.53	33,219
59	Bhimavaram	BJP	122,176	60.99	YSRCP	64,621	32.26	57,555
60	Undi	BJP	107,416	55.81	YSRCP	72,623	37.73	34,793
61	Tanuku	BJP	112,024	58.56	YSRCP	66,124	34.57	45,900
62	Tadepalligudem	BJP	100,674	57.59	YSRCP	60,568	34.65	40,106
Eluru
63	Ungutur	TDP	101,355	56.72	YSRCP	68,783	38.49	32,572
64	Denduluru	TDP	103,573	54.59	YSRCP	81,734	43.08	21,839
65	Eluru	TDP	108,461	66.27	YSRCP	48,562	29.67	59,899
67	Polavaram	TDP	101,175	48.17	YSRCP	96,243	45.82	4,932
68	Chintalapudi	TDP	116,645	53.36	YSRCP	96,277	44.04	20,368
70	Nuzvid	TDP	103,279	49.88	YSRCP	98,891	47.76	4,388
73	Kaikalur	TDP	103,156	58.38	YSRCP	68,828	38.95	34,328
Machilipatnam
71	Gannavaram	JSP	120,966	51.50	YSRCP	100,354	42.73	20,612
72	Gudivada	JSP	94,508	56.53	YSRCP	61,049	36.51	33,459
74	Pedana	JSP	85,366	58.37	YSRCP	53,280	36.43	32,086
75	Machilipatnam	JSP	97,853	61.39	YSRCP	52,110	32.69	45,743
76	Avanigadda	JSP	109,018	60.50	YSRCP	65,606	36.41	43,412
77	Pamarru (SC)	JSP	77,660	48.36	YSRCP	71,811	44.72	5,849
78	Penamaluru	JSP	126,778	54.75	YSRCP	91,001	39.30	35,777
Vijayawada
69	Tiruvuru (SC)	TDP	97,403	54.28	YSRCP	77,329	43.09	20,074
79	Vijayawada West	TDP	108,529	64.23	YSRCP	50,826	30.08	57,703
80	Vijayawada Central	TDP	129,278	64.17	YSRCP	62,922	31.23	66,356
81	Vijayawada East	TDP	120,714	63.25	YSRCP	62,522	32.76	58,192
82	Mylavaram	TDP	135,194	56.70	YSRCP	95,413	40.02	39,781
83	Nandigama (SC)	TDP	98,372	55.02	YSRCP	75,662	42.32	22,710
84	Jaggayyapeta	TDP	95,232	52.75	YSRCP	80,963	44.85	14,269
Guntur
86	Tadikonda (SC)	TDP	105,558	58.46	YSRCP	71,973	39.86	33,585
87	Mangalagiri	TDP	162,935	65.59	YSRCP	80,230	32.30	82,705
88	Ponnur	TDP	107,160	56.80	YSRCP	77,277	40.96	29,883
91	Tenali	TDP	125,362	61.87	YSRCP	71,608	35.34	53,754
93	Prathipadu (SC)	TDP	130,433	60.02	YSRCP	83,136	38.26	47,297
94	Guntur West	TDP	116,804	63.62	YSRCP	63,524	34.60	53,280
95	Guntur East	TDP	102,768	58.50	YSRCP	65,815	37.46	36,953
Narasaraopet
85	Pedakurapadu	TDP	112,811	54.78	YSRCP	89,770	43.59	23,041
96	Chilakaluripet	TDP	107,129	56.06	YSRCP	79,321	41.51	27,808
97	Narasaraopet	TDP	96,418	51.60	YSRCP	85,823	45.93	10,595
98	Sattenapalle	TDP	113,030	54.23	YSRCP	91,658	43.98	21,372
99	Vinukonda	TDP	123,856	52.90	YSRCP	105,689	45.14	18,167
100	Gurajala	TDP	124,993	54.64	YSRCP	99,048	43.30	25,945
101	Macherla	TDP	119,860	55.33	YSRCP	90,877	41.95	28,983
Bapatla (SC)
89	Vemuru (SC)	TDP	95,610	56.76	YSRCP	67,727	40.21	27,883
90	Repalle	TDP	107,485	58.93	YSRCP	68,879	37.76	38,606
92	Bapatla	TDP	83,904	53.46	YSRCP	64,363	41.01	19,541
104	Parchur	TDP	108,579	54.64	YSRCP	84,833	42.69	23,746
105	Addanki	TDP	114,583	54.09	YSRCP	91,736	43.30	22,847
106	Chirala	TDP	92,781	56.28	YSRCP	49,641	30.11	43,140
107	Santhanuthalapadu (SC)	TDP	103,815	55.93	YSRCP	76,637	41.29	27,178
Ongole
102	Yerragondapalem (SC)	YSRCP	91,143	49.81	TDP	85,007	46.46	6,136
103	Darsi	YSRCP	100,610	49.27	TDP	98,047	48.02	2,563
108	Ongole	TDP	113,298	55.90	YSRCP	81,597	40.26	31,701
110	Kondapi (SC)	TDP	111,107	53.09	YSRCP	91,644	43.79	19,463
111	Markapuram	TDP	92,522	49.56	YSRCP	85,639	45.88	6,883
112	Giddalur	YSRCP	98,278	49.17	TDP	91,310	45.68	6,968
113	Kanigiri	TDP	98,538	48.68	YSRCP	95,141	47.00	3,397
Nandyal
134	Allagadda	TDP	93,404	48.18	YSRCP	86,772	44.76	6,632
135	Srisailam	TDP	76,834	47.49	YSRCP	73,850	45.64	2,984
136	Nandikotkur (SC)	TDP	90,478	49.29	YSRCP	80,536	43.88	9,942
138	Panyam	TDP	132,977	54.74	YSRCP	93,545	38.51	39,432
139	Nandyal	TDP	98,678	48.40	YSRCP	81,622	40.04	17,056
140	Banaganapalle	TDP	103,112	51.06	YSRCP	85,192	42.18	17,920
141	Dhone	TDP	93,934	50.36	YSRCP	81,638	43.77	12,296
Kurnoolu
137	Kurnool	TDP	82,811	47.59	YSRCP	64,194	36.89	18,617
142	Pattikonda	TDP	100,247	53.23	YSRCP	78,422	41.64	21,825
143	Kodumur (SC)	TDP	105,453	54.41	YSRCP	72,388	37.35	33,065
144	Yemmiganur	TDP	100,187	50.84	YSRCP	80,968	41.09	19,219
145	Mantralayam	YSRCP	83,304	48.34	TDP	76,526	44.41	6,778
146	Adoni	TDP	87,374	50.35	YSRCP	68,260	39.33	19,114
147	Alur	TDP	97,737	47.16	YSRCP	96,265	46.45	1,472
Anantapur
148	Rayadurg	TDP	126,707	56.32	YSRCP	86,065	38.25	40,642
149	Uravakonda	TDP	99,687	52.17	YSRCP	81,613	42.71	18,074
150	Guntakal	TDP	101,428	50.04	YSRCP	85,680	42.27	15,748
151	Tadpatri	TDP	111,113	54.26	YSRCP	82,714	40.40	28,399
152	Singanamala (SC)	TDP	101,215	49.39	YSRCP	94,460	46.10	6,755
153	Anantapur Urban	TDP	100,189	55.09	YSRCP	66,494	36.56	33,695
154	Kalyandurg	TDP	115,523	57.46	YSRCP	76,743	38.17	38,780
Hindupur
155	Raptadu	TDP	112,529	53.95	YSRCP	90,359	43.32	22,170
156	Madakasira (SC)	TDP	83,219	45.94	YSRCP	78,374	43.26	4,845
157	Hindupur	TDP	101,629	53.28	YSRCP	72,327	37.92	29,302
158	Penukonda	TDP	113,782	56.34	YSRCP	78,708	38.97	35,074
159	Puttaparthi	TDP	91,234	50.83	YSRCP	82,486	45.95	8,748
160	Dharmavaram	TDP	111,632	52.21	YSRCP	92,549	43.29	19,083
161	Kadiri	TDP	98,988	48.74	YSRCP	92,603	45.59	6,385
Kadapa
124	Badvel	YSRCP	91,211	54.16	TDP	62,342	37.02	28,869
126	Kadapa	TDP	66,090	36.20	YSRCP	62,015	33.97	4,075
129	Pulivendla	YSRCP	108,134	58.86	TDP	47,757	26.00	60,377
130	Kamalapuram	TDP	79,750	47.26	YSRCP	75,232	44.58	4,518
131	Jammalamadugu	TDP	102,318	49.21	YSRCP	96,996	46.65	5,322
132	Proddatur	TDP	90,964	46.45	YSRCP	83,233	42.50	7,731
133	Mydukur	TDP	83,137	47.16	YSRCP	81,585	46.28	1,552
Nellore
109	Kandukur	TDP	106,857	53.42	YSRCP	86,684	43.34	20,173
114	Kavali	TDP	111,940	57.15	YSRCP	75,972	38.79	35,968
115	Atmakur	TDP	88,539	49.97	YSRCP	79,803	45.04	8,736
116	Kovur	TDP	127,588	60.86	YSRCP	73,615	35.12	53,973
117	Nellore City	TDP	107,828	63.21	YSRCP	43,714	25.63	64,114
118	Nellore Rural	TDP	109,859	58.33	YSRCP	64,767	34.39	45,092
123	Udayagiri	TDP	98,160	50.25	YSRCP	89,820	45.98	8,340
Tirupati (SC)
119	Sarvepalli	YSRCP	96,754	50.27	BJP	81,847	42.52	14,907
120	Gudur	YSRCP	96,690	50.85	BJP	75,848	39.89	20,842
121	Sullurpeta	YSRCP	90,252	45.63	BJP	89,149	45.07	1,103
122	Venkatagiri	YSRCP	96,515	49.67	BJP	85,326	43.91	11,189
167	Tirupati	BJP	109,784	58.03	YSRCP	63,727	33.69	46,057
168	Srikalahasti	BJP	101,454	49.39	YSRCP	88,347	43.01	13,107
169	Satyavedu	YSRCP	94,417	52.42	BJP	65,086	36.13	29,331
Rajampet
125	Rajampet	YSRCP	92,661	50.88	BJP	76,884	42.22	15,777
127	Kodur (SC)	BJP	73,391	48.50	YSRCP	69,510	45.94	3,881
128	Rayachoti	YSRCP	100,200	51.57	BJP	70,568	36.32	29,632
162	Thamballapalle	YSRCP	95,682	51.99	BJP	73,871	40.14	21,811
163	Pileru	BJP	90,602	48.03	YSRCP	83,614	44.33	6,988
164	Madanapalle	YSRCP	92,611	46.88	BJP	88,180	44.64	4,431
165	Punganur	YSRCP	104,833	51.16	BJP	83,534	40.77	21,299
Chittoor (SC)
166	Chandragiri	TDP	143,841	57.77	YSRCP	91,289	36.67	52,552
170	Nagari	TDP	101,839	58.79	YSRCP	60,315	34.82	41,524
171	Gangadhara Nellore (SC)	TDP	96,883	53.73	YSRCP	75,248	41.73	21,635
172	Chittoor	TDP	85,414	52.42	YSRCP	68,414	41.99	17,000
173	Puthalapattu (SC)	TDP	98,985	51.64	YSRCP	85,852	44.79	13,133
174	Palamaner	TDP	120,273	51.92	YSRCP	98,597	42.57	21,676
175	Kuppam	TDP	118,301	59.32	YSRCP	72,754	36.48	45,547

== See also ==
- 2024 Indian general election in Puducherry
- 2024 Indian general election in Jharkhand
- 2024 Indian general election in Bihar
