= Araku Lok Sabha constituency =

Lok Sabha Constituency in Andhra Pradesh

Coordinates: 18.33°N 82.87°E

Araku AP-1
- Lok Sabha constituency
- Interactive Map Outlining Araku Lok Sabha constituency

Constituency details
- Country: India
- Region: South India
- State: Andhra Pradesh
- Assembly constituencies: Palakonda; Kurupam; Parvathipuram; Salur; Araku Valley; Paderu; Rampachodavaram
- Established: 2008
- Reservation: ST

Member of Parliament
- 18th Lok Sabha
- Incumbent Gumma Thanuja Rani
- Party: YSRCP
- Alliance: None
- Elected year: 2024

Araku is one of the twenty-five lok sabha constituencies of Andhra Pradesh in India. As per the Delimitation of Parliamentary and Assembly Constituencies Order (2008), it was formed as a reserved constituency for the Scheduled tribes, comprising seven assembly segments and belongs to Alluri Sitharama Raju district and Parvathipuram Manyam district s .

== Assembly Segments ==
The seven Assembly segments of Araku Lok Sabha constituency are:

#	Name	District	Member	Party	Leading (in 2024)
10	Palakonda (ST)	Parvathipuram	Nimmaka Jaya Krishna	JSP	BJP
11	Kurupam (ST)	Parvathipuram	Jagadeeswari Thoyaka	TDP	BJP
12	Parvathipuram (SC)	Parvathipuram	Bonela Vijaya Chandra	TDP	BJP
13	Saluru (ST)	Parvathipuram	Gummadi Sandhya Rani	TDP	BJP
28	Araku Valley (ST)	Alluri Sitharama Raju	Regam Matyalingam	YSRCP	YSRCP
29	Paderu (ST)	Alluri Sitharama Raju	Matsyarasa Visweswara Raju	YSRCP	YSRCP
53	Rampachodavaram (ST)	Polavaram	Miryala Sirisha Devi	TDP	YSRCP

== Members of Parliament ==
Year	Member	Party
1952–2009: Parvathipuram
2009	Kishore Chandra Deo	Indian National Congress
2014	Kothapalli Geetha	YSR Congress Party
2019	Goddeti Madhavi	YSR Congress Party
2024	Gumma Thanuja Rani	YSR Congress Party

== Election results ==
=== General Election 2024 ===
2024 Indian general election: Araku
Party	Candidate	Votes	%	±%
YSRCP	Gumma Thanuja Rani	600,134	51.53	▼0.61
BJP	Kothapalli Geetha	4,26,425	36.62	▲34.96
CPI(M)	Appalanarasa Pachipenta	13	0.00	▲0.00
NOTA	None of the above	50,470	4.33	▼0.12
Majority		1,73,709	14.91	▼5.87
Turnout		11,65,787	74.87	▲0.84
YSRCP hold		Swing		

=== General Election 2019 ===
2019 Indian general election: Araku
Party	Candidate	Votes	%	±%
YSRCP	Goddeti Madhavi	562,190	52.14	▲6.93
TDP	Kishore Chandra Deo	338,101	31.36	▼3.85
NOTA	None of the above	47,977	4.45	▲2.64
JSP	Gangulaiah Vampuru	42,794	3.97	N/A
BJP	K. K. V. V. V. Satyanarayana Reddy	17,867	1.66	▲1.66
INC	Shruti Devi Vyricherla	17,730	1.64	▼4.15
Majority		224,089	20.78	▲10.78
Turnout		10,74,538	74.03	▲2.53
Registered electors		14,51,418		
YSRCP hold		Swing		

=== General Election 2014 ===
2014 Indian general election: Araku
Party	Candidate	Votes	%	±%
YSRCP	Kothapalli Geetha	413,191	45.42	New
TDP	Gummadi Sandhya Rani	321,793	35.38	▲35.38
INC	Kishore Chandra Deo	52,884	5.81	▼39.68
CPI(M)	Midiyam Baburao	38,898	4.26	▼16.94
Independent	Kangala Baludora	23,251	2.55	N/A
Independent	Chetti Sankararao	8,951	0.98	N/A
AAP	Burjabariki Dhanaraju	8,569	0.94	New
Independent	Sallangi Ratnam	7,688	0.85	N/A
Independent	Biddika Ramaiah	7,587	0.83	N/A
Independent	Illa Rami Reddy	5,692	0.63	▼0.90
Independent	Vanugu Sankararao	4,614	0.51	N/A
NOTA	None of the above	16,532	1.82	N/A
Majority		91,398	10.04	▼14.25
Turnout		909,614	72.92	▲5.91
YSRCP gain from INC		Swing		

=== General Election 2009 ===
2009 Indian general election: Araku
Party	Candidate	Votes	%	±%
INC	Kishore Chandra Deo	360,458	45.49	
CPI(M)	Midiyam Baburao	168,014	21.20	
PRP	Meenaka Simhachalam	128,649	16.24	
Independent	Jayalakshmi Shambudu	27,758	3.50	
BSP	Lake Raja Rao	24,331	3.07	
BJP	Kurusa Bojjaiah	23,093	2.91	
Independent	Appa Rao Kinjedi	15,851	2.00	
LSP	Vadigala Pentayya	13,886	1.75	
Independent	Illa Rami Reddy	12,086	1.53	
RJD	Gadugu Balayya Dora	10,450	1.32	
Independent	Arika Gumpa Swamy	7,791	0.98	
Majority		192,444	24.29	
Turnout		792,367	67.01	
INC win (new seat)				

== See also ==
- List of constituencies of the Andhra Pradesh Legislative Assembly
