= Gumma Thanuja Rani =

Indian politician

Member of Parliament, Lok Sabha
- Incumbent
- Assumed office 4 June 2024
- Preceded by: Goddeti Madhavi
- Constituency: Araku

Personal details
- Party: YSR Congress Party
- Occupation: Politician

Gumma Thanuja Rani (born 1993) an Indian politician from Andhra Pradesh. She was elected to Lok Sabha from Araku Lok Sabha constituency representing Yuvajana Sramika Rythu Congress Party.

== Early life and education ==
Gumma Thanuja Rani, née Chetti, was born to Gumma Syam Sundar Rao, a native of Addumanda, Hukumpet in ASR district. She married Chetti Vinay and has a daughter Chetti Yashnaa. She is the daughter-in-law of Chetti Phalguna. She did her graduation in medicine at International Higher School of Medicine, International University of Kyrgyzstan, Bishkek, Kyrgyzstan. She also served as an epidemiologist in ASR district.

== Career ==
Rani made her political debut winning the 2024 Indian general election in Andhra Pradesh representing YSR Congress Party from Araku Lok Sabha Constituency, one of the biggest constituencies in India with a population of over 14.5 lakhs. She polled 4,77,005 votes and defeated Kothapalli Geetha of Bharatiya Janata Party by a margin of 50,580 votes.

== See also ==
- 18th Lok Sabha
