= Bobbili Chiranjeevulu =

Indian politician

Bobbili Chiranjeevulu (born 1958) is an Indian politician from Andhra Pradesh. He was a former member of the Andhra Pradesh Legislative Assembly from Parvathipuram Assembly constituency which is reserved for the Scheduled Caste comminity in Vizianagaram district representing the Telugu Desam Party.

== Early life and education ==
Chiranjeevulu is from Parvathipuram, Vizianagaram district, Andhra Pradesh. He is the son of Bobbili Chinna. He completed his MA at Andhra University, Visakhapatnam, in 2002 and did his BEd at Maharaja College of Education,Vizianagaram 1985. He is a retired government employee and his wife is a teacher. He declared assets worth Rs.9 lakhs in his affidavit to the Election Commission of India.

== Career ==
Chiranjeevulu won from Parvathipuram Assembly constituency in the 2014 Andhra Pradesh Legislative Assembly election representing the Telugu Desam Party. He polled 62,458 and defeated his nearest rival, Jammana Prasanna Kumar of the YSR Congress Party, by a margin of 6,129 votes. He polled 51,105 votes but lost to Alajangi Jogarao of the YSR Congress Party in the 2019 Andhra Pradesh Legislative Assembly election by a margin of 24,199 votes.
