= Miriyala =

Miriyala or Miryala is a Telugu surname. Notable people with the surname include:

- Miriyala Sirisha Devi (born 1994), Indian politician
- Ram Miriyala (born 1987), Indian musician
