= A. Yerukunaidu =

Indian politician

Allu Yerukunaidu was an Indian politician. Around the time of the 1951-1952 elections, A. Yerukunaidu was part of the Indian National Congress faction around the Srikakulam District Congress leader B. Kurmanna. The Congress Party fielded A. Yerukunaidu as its candidate in the Salur constituency in the 1952 Madras Legislative Assembly election. He finished in second place with 6,760 votes (18.60%).

Ahead of the 1955 Andhra State Legislative Assembly election, there were tensions between the N. Sanjiva Reddy (whom B. Kurmanna supported) and Gouthu Latchanna within the Congress Party during the process of allocating tickets for candidatures. A. Yerukunaidu and others from the B. Kurmanna group were denied Congress tickets. A. Yerukunaidu joined the Praja Socialist Party, and contested the Salur constituency (which was now a two-member constituency) as a PSP candidate. He was elected, obtaining 19,204 votes. Along with all 12 other PSP legislators in the state, A. Yerukunaidu sided with P.V.G. Raju in the 1955 party split and joined Ram Manohar Lohia's Socialist Party.

A. Yerukunaidu rejoined the Congress Party in 1960, as P.V.G. Raju merged his group into the Indian National Congress. The Congress Party fielded A. Yerukunaidu for reelection from Salur in the 1962 Andhra Pradesh Legislative Assembly election, but he lost the seat. A. Yerukunaidu finished in second place with 9,288 votes (23.93%).

A. Yerukunaidu died in the mid-1970s. The Andhra Pradesh Legislative Assembly died homage to him on February 26, 1975.
