= Nimmaka Jaya Krishna =

Indian politician

Member of Legislative Assembly, Andhra Pradesh
- Incumbent
- Assumed office 2024
- Preceded by: Viswasarayi Kalavathi
- Constituency: Palakonda

Personal details
- Party: Janasena Party (since 2024)
- Other political affiliations: Telugu Desam Party (until 2024)

Nimmaka Jaya Krishna (born 1979) is an Indian politician from Andhra Pradesh. He is a member of Janasena Party.

== Early life and education ==
Jaya Krishna was born in Rajapuram village, Veeraghattam mandal, Palakonda revenue division, in the erstwhile Srikakulam district. It is presently in Parvathipuram Manyam district. He is the son of late Nimmaka Gopala Rao, a four time MLA representing Telugu Desam party. His wife is a government employee. He completed his Master of Science degree in 2006 at Osmania University, Hyderabad.

== Career ==
He has been elected as the Member of the Legislative Assembly representing the Palakonda Assembly constituency which is reserved for ST community in Parvathipuram Manyam district. He won the 2024 Andhra Pradesh Legislative Assembly elections representing Janasena Party which had a pre poll alliance with Telugu Desam Party and BJP. He polled 75,208 votes and defeated his nearest rival, Viswasarayi Kalavathi of YSR Congress party, by a margin of 13,291 votes.

After the death of his father in 2010, he contested on TDP ticket in the 2014 Andhra Pradesh Legislative Assembly election and lost to Viswasarayi Kalavathi of YSR Congress Party by a narrow margin of 1,620 votes. He lost again in the 2019 Andhra Pradesh Legislative Assembly election to the same candidate by a margin of 17,980 votes. Just before the 2024 Assembly election he shifted to Janasena Party.
