= Goddeti Madhavi =

Politician from Andhra Pradesh, India

Member of Parliament, Lok Sabha
- In office 23 May 2019 – 2024
- Preceded by: Kothapalli Geetha
- Succeeded by: Gumma Thanuja Rani
- Constituency: Araku

Personal details
- Born: 18 June 1992 (age 34) Velagalapalem, Visakhapatnam district, Andhra Pradesh
- Party: YSR Congress Party
- Spouse: Kusireddi Siva Prasad
- Parent: Goddeti Demudu
- Education: Jawahar Navodaya Vidyalya

Goddeti Madhavi is an Indian politician. She was elected to the Lok Sabha, lower house of the Parliament of India from Araku, Andhra Pradesh in the 2019 Indian general election as a member of the YSR Congress Party. She is the youngest member of parliament from Andhra Pradesh. She is a physical education teacher. Her father, the late Goddeti Demudu, was a communist leader and former legislator.

== Personal life ==
On 18 October 2019, Madhavi married Siva Prasad, who had played a key role in her poll campaign. She is an alumna of Jawahar Navodaya Vidyalaya.
