= Thoyaka Jagadeeswari =

Indian politician

Member of the Andhra Pradesh Legislative Assembly
- Incumbent
- Assumed office 2024
- Preceded by: Pamula Pushpa Sreevani
- Constituency: Kurupam

Personal details
- Party: Telugu Desam Party

Thoyaka Jagadeeswari (born 1985) is an Indian politician from Andhra Pradesh. She is a member of the Andhra Pradesh Legislative Assembly representing the Telugu Desam Party. She was elected from the Kurupam Assembly constituency which is reserved for the Scheduled Tribe community in Parvathipuram Manyam district in the 2024 Andhra Pradesh Legislative Assembly election.

== Early life and education ==
Jagadeeswari is from Kurupam, Parvathipuram Manyam district, Andhra Pradesh, India. She is married to Addukula Sanyasi Naidu, a teacher in the government upper primary school. She completed her B.Sc. (BZC) at DBK College, Parvathipuram in 2013, She declared assets worth Rs.32 lakhs in the affidavit filed with the Election Commission of India before the elections.

== Career ==
Jagadeeswari was first elected as an MLA from Kurupam Assembly constituency representing the Telugu Desam Party in the 2024 Andhra Pradesh Legislative Assembly election. She polled 83,355 votes and defeated her nearest rival, Pamula Pushpa Sreevani of the YSR Congress Party, by a margin of 23,500 votes. After getting elected as an MLA, she became a government whip.

Before the election, election commission sent a notice to her husband Addukula Sanyasi Naidu requesting clarification regarding the use of his official residence for party activities. Later, the district collector issued suspension orders to Naidu, after an inquiry where photos of new members joining TDP at his premises were produced.

In January 2025, she visited Gummidi Gedda water project in Kurupam mandal along with district collector A Shyam Prasad to revive proposals to upgrade the mini reservoir to provide water to about 5,000 acre of ayacut. The project is also expected to provide drinking water to Kurupam village. A 3,500 acre ayacut was constructed way back to 1970s.
