= Parvathipuram Assembly constituency =

Constituency of the Andhra Pradesh Legislative Assembly, India

Coordinates: 18.78°N 83.43°E

Parvathipuram
- Constituency No. 12 for the Andhra Pradesh Legislative Assembly
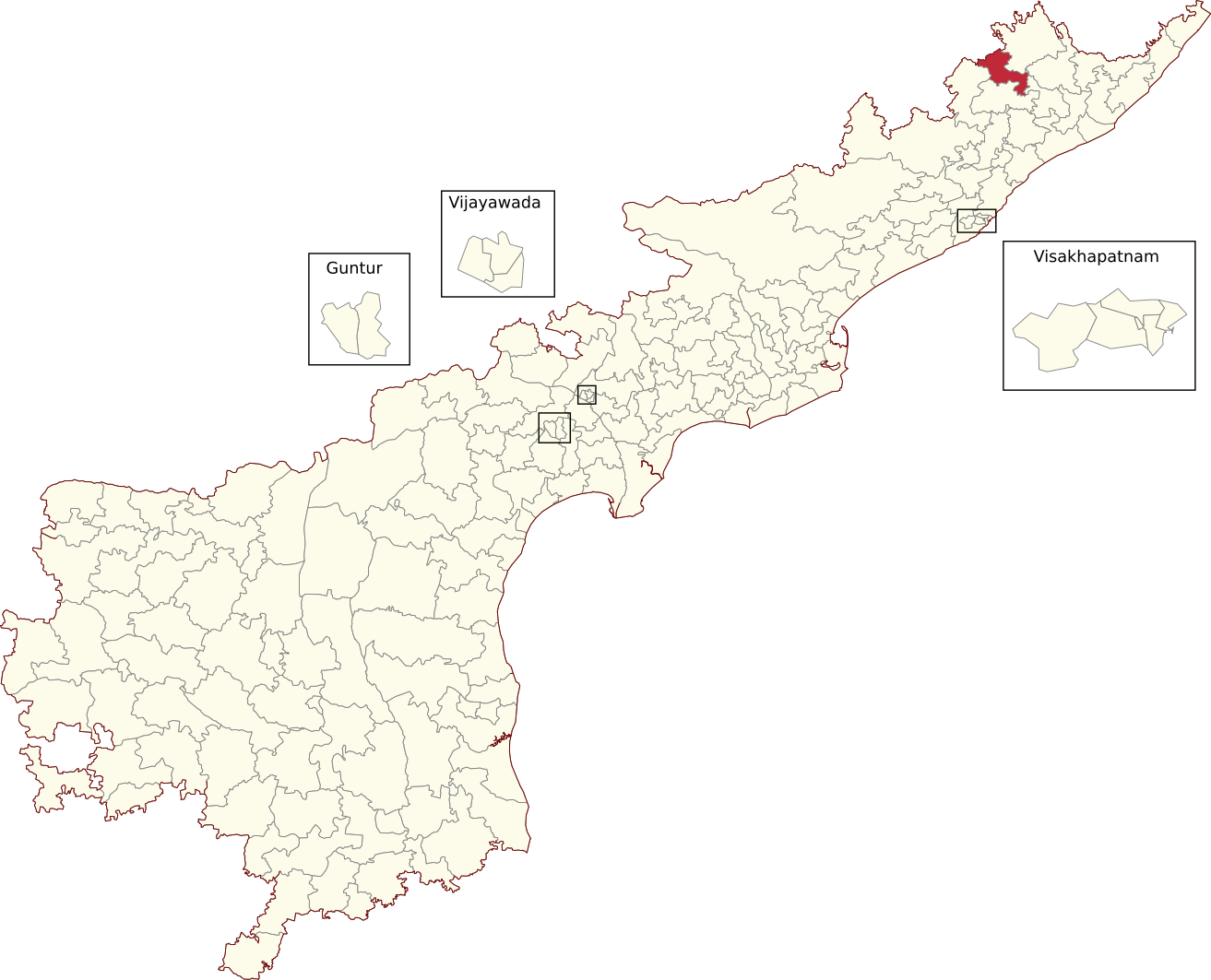
- Location of Parvathipuram Assembly constituency within Andhra Pradesh

Constituency details
- Country: India
- Region: South India
- State: Andhra Pradesh
- District: Parvathipuram Manyam
- Lok Sabha constituency: Araku
- Established: 1951
- Total electors: 182,333
- Reservation: SC

Member of Legislative Assembly
- 16th Andhra Pradesh Legislative Assembly
- Incumbent Bonela Vijaya Chandra
- Party: TDP
- Alliance: NDA
- Elected year: 2024

Parvathipuram is a Scheduled Caste reserved constituency in Parvathipuram Manyam district of Andhra Pradesh that elects representatives to the Andhra Pradesh Legislative Assembly in India. It is one of the seven assembly segments of Araku Lok Sabha constituency.

Bonela Vijaya Chandra is the current MLA of the constituency, having won the 2024 Andhra Pradesh Legislative Assembly election from Telugu Desam Party. As of 2019, there are a total of 182,333 electors in the constituency. The constituency was established in 1951, as per the Delimitation Orders (1951).

== Mandals ==
The three mandals that form the assembly constituency are:

Mandal
Parvathipuram
Seethanagaram
Balijipeta

Mandals in Parvathipuram Assembly Constituency

== Members of the Legislative Assembly ==
Year	Member	Political party
1952	V. D. Veerabhadra Deo Bahadur	Indian National Congress
1955	V.Chandrachudamani Dev	Independent
1962	V.Chandrachudamani Dev	Indian National Congress
1967	V. Ramanaidu	Swatantra Party
1972	Chikati Parasuram Naidu	Independent
1978	Chikati Parasuram Naidu	Janata Party
1983	Mariserla Venkata Rami Naidu	Telugu Desam Party
1985	Mariserla Venkata Rami Naidu	Telugu Desam Party
1989	Yarra Krishna Murty	Telugu Desam Party
1994	Yarra Krishna Murty	Telugu Desam Party
1999	Mariserla Sivunnaidu	Indian National Congress
2004	Vijaya Ramaraju Setrucharla	Indian National Congress
2009	Savarapu Jayamani	Indian National Congress
2014	Bobbili Chiranjeevulu	Telugu Desam Party
2019	Alajangi Jogarao	YSR Congress Party
2024	Bonela Vijaya Chandra	Telugu Desam Party

== Election results ==
=== 2024 ===
2024 Andhra Pradesh Legislative Assembly election: Parvathipuram
Party	Candidate	Votes	%	±%
TDP	Bonela Vijaya Chandra	83,905	44.04	▲
YSRCP	Alajangi Jogarao	59,491	31.23	▼
INC	Bathina Mohana Rao	1,640	0.86	▼
Remaining	"5" candidates	3,132	1.64	▼
NOTA	None of the above	3,465	1.82	▲
Turnout		1,51,633	79.59	▲
Registered electors		1,90,512		▲
Majority		24,414	12.81	▲
TDP gain from YSRCP		Swing		

=== 2019 ===
2019 Andhra Pradesh Legislative Assembly election: Parvathipuram
Party	Candidate	Votes	%	±%
YSRCP	Alajangi Jogarao	75,304	41.18	▲
TDP	Bobbili Chiranjeevulu	51,105	27.95	▼
JSP	GONGADA GOWRI SANKARA Rao	6,609	3.61	New
Remaining	"4" candidates	4,136	2.26	▼
NOTA	None of the above	3,521	1.92	▲
Turnout		1,40,675	76.93	▲
Registered electors		1,82,866		▲
Majority		24,199	13.23	▲
YSRCP gain from TDP		Swing		

=== 2014 ===
2014 Andhra Pradesh Legislative Assembly election: Parvathipuram
Party	Candidate	Votes	%	±%
TDP	Bobbili Chiranjeevulu	62,458	35.91	
YSRCP	Jammana Prasanna Kumar	56,329	32.39	New
INC	Alajangi Jogarao	6,511	3.74	
CPI(M)	YAMMALA MANMADHA RAO	1,587	0.91	
Remaining	"4" Candidates	2,563	1.47	
NOTA	None of the above	830	0.48	
Turnout		1,30,278	74.91	
Registered electors		1,73,905		
Majority		6,129	3.52	
TDP gain from INC		Swing		

=== 2009 ===
2009 Andhra Pradesh Legislative Assembly election: Parvathipuram
Party	Candidate	Votes	%	±%
INC	Savarapu Jayamani	49,614	41.36	−7.40
TDP	Bobbili Chiranjeevulu	46,896	39.09	−7.85
PRP	Latha Rittapalli	10,946	9.13	
Majority		2,718	2.27	
Turnout		120,053	73.17	−3.47
INC hold		Swing		

=== 2004 ===
2004 Andhra Pradesh Legislative Assembly election: Parvathipuram
Party	Candidate	Votes	%	±%
INC	Vijayaramaraju Satrucharla	48,276	48.76	−5.99
TDP	D Jagadeeswara Rao	46,480	46.94	+7.52
Majority		1,796	1.82	
Turnout		99,010	76.64	+1.54
INC hold		Swing		

=== 1999 ===
1999 Andhra Pradesh Legislative Assembly election: Parvathipuram
Party	Candidate	Votes	%	±%
INC	Mariserla Sivunnaidu	49,891	54.8	▲13.7
Anna Telugu Desam Party	Majji Rao	2,485	2.7	
Independent	Tandra Aruna	1,859	2.0	−0.3
Independent	Devarapalli Nookannadora	690	0.8	
Independent	Mavudi Rao	281	0.3	
Majority		13,967	14.9	+4.2
Turnout		93,764	75.1	−1.5
INC gain from TDP		Swing		

=== 1994 ===
1994 Andhra Pradesh Legislative Assembly election: Parvathipuram
Party	Candidate	Votes	%	±%
TDP	Yarra Murty	47,448	52.0	▲0.4
INC	Mariserla Sivunnaidu	37,468	41.1	▼7.3
Independent	Tandra Aruna	2,075	2.3	
Independent	Karra Seethayya	1,764	1.9	
BJP	Appalaswamy Vangapandu	734	0.8	
BSP	Gumpa Rao	624	0.7	
Independent	Gedala Raminaidu	589	0.7	
Independent	Chinagudaba Subbarao	420	0.5	
Independent	Vavilapalli Naidu	112	0.1	
Majority		9,980	10.7	+7.6
Turnout		93,200	76.6	+1.2
TDP hold		Swing		

=== 1989 ===
1989 Andhra Pradesh Legislative Assembly election: Parvathipuram
Party	Candidate	Votes	%	±%
TDP	Yarra Murty	42,555	51.6	−9.8
INC	Sivunnaidu Mariserla	39,866	48.4	+11.7
Majority		2,689	3.1	−21
Turnout		85,830	75.4	+5.5
TDP hold		Swing		

=== 1985 ===
1985 Andhra Pradesh Legislative Assembly election: Parvathipuram
Party	Candidate	Votes	%	±%
TDP	Mariserla Naidu	39,826	61.4	+2.3
INC	Parasuram Doddi	23,824	36.7	+8.7
Independent	Mukkala Yallayya	686	1.1	
Independent	Chamala Surayya	563	0.9	
Majority		16,002	24.1	−6.4
Turnout		66,470	69.9	−3.3
TDP hold		Swing		

=== 1983 ===
1983 Andhra Pradesh Legislative Assembly election: Parvathipuram
Party	Candidate	Votes	%	±%
TDP	Mariserla Naidu	37,553	59.1	
INC	Doddi Parasuramu	17,815	28.0	+0.4
Independent	Cheekati Naidu	5,920	9.3	−0.3
IC(S)	Dwarapureddi Suryanarayana	1,529	2.4	
Independent	Yella Rao	707	1.1	
Majority		19,738	30.5	+8
Turnout		64,788	73.2	−6.9
TDP gain from JP		Swing		

=== 1978 ===
1978 Andhra Pradesh Legislative Assembly election: Parvathipuram
Party	Candidate	Votes	%	±%
JP	Chikati Parasuram Naidu	32,494	50.8	▼9.07
INC	Vasireddi Naidu	17,671	27.6	−12.53
INC(I)	Paruvada Rao	12,025	18.8	
Independent	Pakki Rao	1,801	2.8	
Majority		14,823	22.5	+2.76
Turnout		65,893	80.1	+8.56
JP hold		Swing		

=== 1972 ===
1972 Andhra Pradesh Legislative Assembly election: Parvathipuram
Party	Candidate	Votes	%	±%
Independent	Chikati Naidu	32,027	59.87	
INC	Marisela Naidu	21,467	40.13	+4.54
Majority		10,560	19.74	+4.56
Turnout		53,494	71.54	+0.84
Independent gain from SWA		Swing		

=== 1967 ===
1967 Andhra Pradesh Legislative Assembly election: Parvathipuram
Party	Candidate	Votes	%	±%
SWA	V. Ramanaidu	23,096	50.77	
INC	P.N. Cheekati	16,190	35.59	−23.22
Independent	L. Paruvaca	4,016	8.86	
ABJS	V.R. Kothapalli	2,186	4.81	
Majority		6,906	15.18	+17.63
Turnout		45,488	70.70	
SWA gain from INC		Swing		

=== 1962 ===
1962 Andhra Pradesh Legislative Assembly election: Parvathipuram
Party	Candidate	Votes	%	±%
INC	Vyricherla Dev	24,850	58.81	−1.47
Independent	Paruvada Naidu	17,403	41.18	
Majority		7,447	17.63	−2.93
Turnout		42,253		
INC hold		Swing		

=== 1955 ===
1955 Andhra State Legislative Assembly election: Parvathipuram
Party	Candidate	Votes	%	±%
Independent	Vyricherla Dev	27,480	60.28	
KLP	Cheekati Parasuram Naiudu	18,111	39.72	+19.70
Majority		9,369	20.56	−14.85
Turnout		45,591	70.06	+5.12
Independent gain from INC		Swing		

=== 1952 ===
1952 Madras Legislative Assembly election: Parvathipuram
Party	Candidate	Votes	%	±%
INC	Vyricherla Durgaprasad Veerabhadra Deo Bahadur	28,129	55.44%	55.44%
KLP	Cheekati Parasuram Naiudu	10,160	20.02%	
Socialist Party (India)	Muddidi Balu Paramkusan Naiudu	8,910	17.56%	
Independent	Darapureddi Balarameswami	3,540	6.98%	
Margin of victory		17,969	35.41%	
Turnout		50,739	64.94%	
Registered electors		78,137		
INC win (new seat)				

== See also ==
- List of constituencies of the Andhra Pradesh Legislative Assembly
