= Rampachodavaram Assembly constituency =

Constituency of the Andhra Pradesh Legislative Assembly, India

Coordinates: 17.45°N 81.78°E

Rampachodavaram
- Constituency No. 53 for the Andhra Pradesh Legislative Assembly
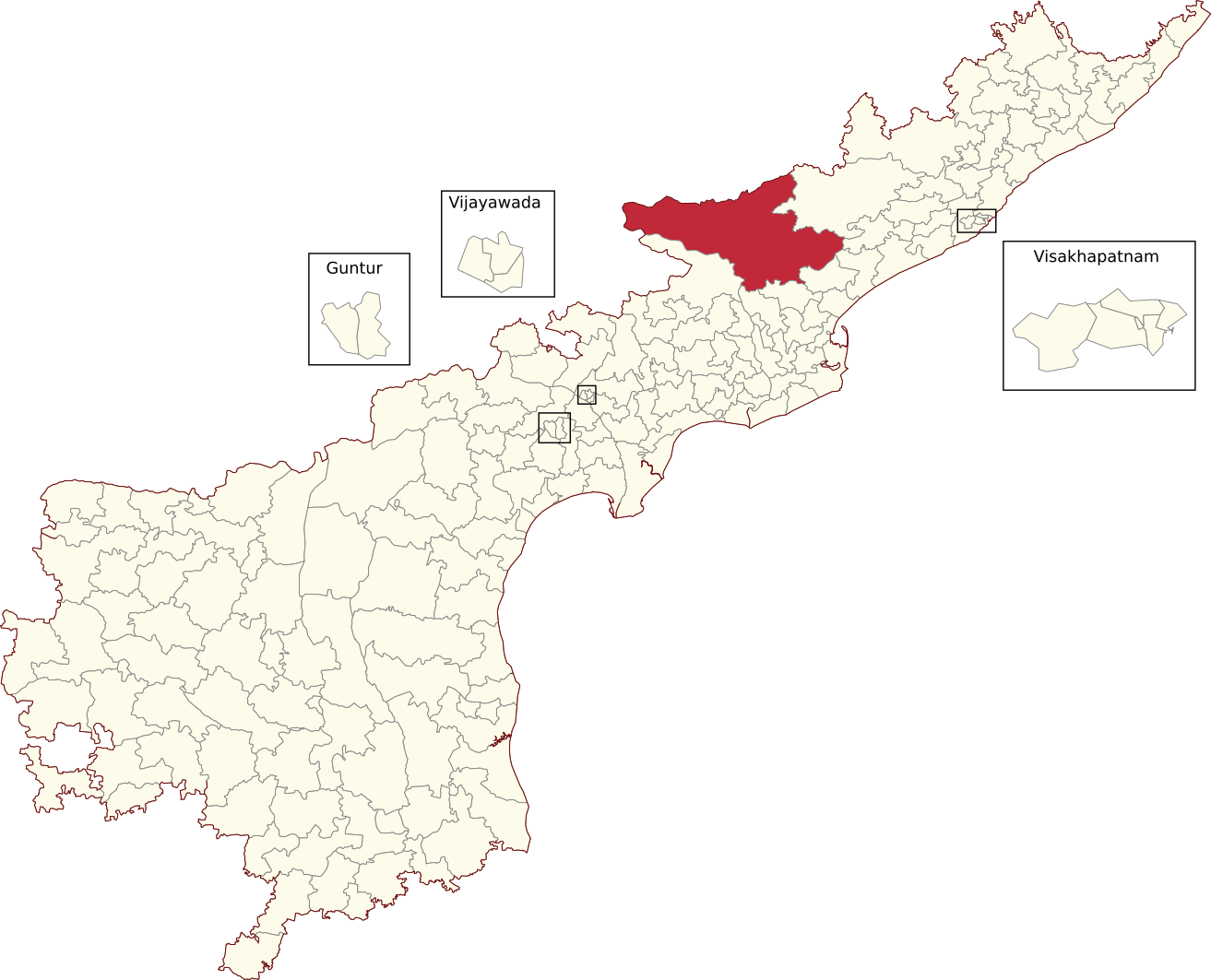
- Location of Rampachodavaram Assembly constituency within Andhra Pradesh

Constituency details
- Country: India
- Region: South India
- State: Andhra Pradesh
- District: Polavaram
- Lok Sabha constituency: Araku
- Established: 2008
- Total electors: 260,323
- Reservation: ST

Member of Legislative Assembly
- 16th Andhra Pradesh Legislative Assembly
- Incumbent Miriyala Sirisha Devi
- Party: TDP
- Alliance: NDA
- Elected year: 2024

Rampachodavaram is a Scheduled Tribe reserved constituency in Polavaram district of Andhra Pradesh that elects representatives to the Andhra Pradesh Legislative Assembly in India. It is one of the seven assembly segments of Araku Lok Sabha constituency.

Miriyala Sirisha Devi is the current MLA of the constituency, having won the 2024 Andhra Pradesh Legislative Assembly election from Telugu Desam Party. As of 2019, there are a total of 260,323 electors in the constituency. The constituency was established in 2008, as per the Delimitation Orders (2008).

== Mandals ==
The eleven mandals that form the assembly constituency are:

Mandal
Maredumilli
Devipatnam
Y.Ramavaram
Addateegala
Gangavaram
Rampachodavaram
Rajavommangi
Kunavaram
Chintoor
Vararamachandrapuram
Nellipaka

Mandals in Rampachodavaram Assembly Constituency

== Members of the Legislative Assembly ==
Year	Member	Political party
2009	K. K. V. V. V. Satyanarayana Reddy	Indian National Congress
2014	Vanthala Rajeswari	YSR Congress Party
2019	Nagulapalli Dhanalakshmi	YSR Congress Party
2024	Miriyala Sirisha Devi	Telugu Desam Party

== Election results ==
=== 2009 ===
2009 Andhra Pradesh Legislative Assembly election: Rampachodavaram
Party	Candidate	Votes	%	±%
INC	K. K. V. V. V. Satyanarayana Reddy	32,654	34.16	
TDP	Chinnam Babu Ramesh	21,851	22.86	
PRP	Seethamsetti Venkateswararao	20,771	21.73	
Majority		10,803	11.30	
Turnout		95,593	68.70	
INC win (new seat)				

=== 2014 ===
2014 Andhra Pradesh Legislative Assembly election: Rampachodavaram
Party	Candidate	Votes	%	±%
YSRCP	Vanthala Rajeswari	52,156	45.36	
TDP	Seethamsetti Venkateswara Rao	43,934	38.21	
Majority		8,222	7.15	
Turnout		114,978	76.23	+7.53
YSRCP gain from INC		Swing		

=== 2019 ===
2019 Andhra Pradesh Legislative Assembly election: Rampachodavaram
Party	Candidate	Votes	%	±%
YSRCP	Nagulapalli Dhanalakshmi	98,318	48.72%	
TDP	Vanthala Rajeswari	59,212	29.34%	
CPI(M)	Sunnam Rajaiah	18,182	9.01%	
INC	Gondi Balaiah	5,013	2.49%	
Majority		39,106	19.38%	
Turnout		201,807	77.52%	+7.53
YSRCP hold		Swing		

=== 2024 ===
2024 Andhra Pradesh Legislative Assembly election: Rampachodavaram
Party	Candidate	Votes	%	±%
TDP	Miriyala Sirisha Devi	90,087	42.8	
YSRCP	Nagulapalli Dhanalakshmi	80,948	38.45	
CPI(M)	Lotha Rama Rao	21,265	10.1	
NOTA	None of the above	7,269	3.45	
Majority		9,139	4.35	
Turnout		2,10,508		
		Swing		

== See also ==
- List of constituencies of the Andhra Pradesh Legislative Assembly
