= Vanthala Rajeswari =

Indian politician

Member of Legislative Assembly, Andhra Pradesh
- In office 2014–2019
- Preceded by: Seethamsetti Venkateswara Rao
- Succeeded by: Nagulapalli Dhanalakshmi
- Constituency: Rampachodavaram

Personal details
- Born: July 10, 1981 (age 45) Rampachodavaram, Alluri Sitarama Raju district, Andhra Pradesh, India
- Party: Telugu Desam Party
- Other political affiliations: YSR Congress Party (until 2017)
- Parent: Konda Babu (father)
- Education: Studied up to Class VII, Zilla Parishad High School, Addateegala
- Occupation: Politician

Vanthala Rajeswari (born 10 July 1981) is an Indian politician from Andhra Pradesh. In 2014, she became a first-time MLA from Rampachodavaram Assembly constituency which is reserved for Scheduled Tribe community in the erstwhile East Godavari District, which is presently Alluri Sitaramaraju District. She won the 2014 Andhra Pradesh Legislative Assembly election on YSR Congress Party ticket.

== Early life and education ==
Rajeswari hails from Rampachodavaram. Her father late Konda Babu was a farmer. She studied Class VII from Zilla Parishad High School, Addateegala. Later, she discontinued her studies.

== Career ==
In 2019 Andhra Pradesh Legislative Assembly election she lost to Nagulapalli Dhanalakshi of the YSR Congress Party. She contested on the Telugu Desam Party ticket and polled 59,212 votes but lost by a margin of 39,106 votes. She was first elected as an MLA winning the 2014 Andhra Pradesh Legislative Assembly election on YSR Congress Party ticket from Rampachodavaram Assembly constituency. She polled 52,156 votes and defeated Seethamsetti Venkateswara Rao of the Telugu Desam Party by a margin of 8,222. In 2017, she left YSR Congress Party and joined TDP in the presence of party supremo Chandrababu Naidu. She was denied a ticket for the 2024 Andhra Pradesh Legislative Assembly election.
