= Peedika Rajanna Dora =

Indian politician

10th Deputy Chief Minister of Andhra Pradesh
- In office 11 April 2022 – 11 June 2024 Serving with Amzath Basha Shaik Bepari; Budi Mutyala Naidu; K. Narayana Swamy; Kottu Satyanarayana
- Governor: Biswabhusan Harichandan; S. Abdul Nazeer
- Chief Minister: Y. S. Jagan Mohan Reddy
- Preceded by: Alla Nani; K. Narayana Swamy; Pilli Subhash Chandra Bose; Pamula Pushpa Sreevani; Dharmana Krishna Das
- Succeeded by: Konidela Pawan Kalyan

Member of Legislative Assembly Andhra Pradesh
- In office 2009–2024
- Preceded by: Rajendra Pratap Bhanj deo
- Succeeded by: Gummidi Sandhya Rani
- Constituency: Salur

Peedika Rajanna Dora is an Indian politician who served as the 10th Deputy Chief Minister of Andhra Pradesh and Member of Andhra Pradesh Legislative Assembly from Salur Assembly constituency from 2009. He also served as Minister for Tribal Welfare.
