= K. K. V. V. V. Satyanarayana Reddy =

Indian politician

Member of Andhra Pradesh Legislative Assembly
- In office 2009–2014
- Preceded by: New Seat
- Succeeded by: Vanthala Rajeswari
- Constituency: Rampachodavaram

Personal details
- Born: Dr. Kasi Viswanadha Veera Venkata Satyanarayana Reddy Kosuri
- Party: Bharatiya Janata Party
- Education: B.Tech(ECE), M.Tech(CSE), L.L.B, L.L.M( Constitutional & Administrative Laws), M.S.W (Master of Social Work), Ph.D (Computer Science),
- Alma mater: Rayalaseema University

Kosuri Kasi Viswanadha Veera Venkata Satyanarayana Reddy is an Indian politician. He was elected to the Andhra Pradesh Legislative Assembly from Rampachodavaram in the 2009 Andhra Pradesh Legislative Assembly election as a member of the Indian National Congress.
