= Savarapu Jayamani =

Indian politician

Savarapu Jayamani (born 1968) is an Indian politician from Andhra Pradesh. She is a former member of the Andhra Pradesh Legislative Assembly from Parvathipuram Assembly constituency in Parvtipuram Manyam district. She was last elected in the 2009 Andhra Pradesh Legislative Assembly election representing the Indian National Congress.

== Early life and education ==
Jayamani is from Parvathipuram, Parvathipuram Manyam district, Andhra Pradesh. She is the daughter of Savarapu Rama Rao. She studied Class 12 at Rajah RSRK Ranga Rao College, Bobbili and passed her examinations in 1989.

== Career ==
Jayamani was first elected as an MLA in the Parvathipuram Assembly constituency winning the 2009 Andhra Pradesh Legislative Assembly election on the Indian National Congress ticket. She polled 49,614 votes and defeated her nearest rival. Bobbili Chiranjeevulu of the Telugu Desam Party, by a margin of 2,718 votes.

In 2014, she resigned as a member of the Indian National Congress and joined YSR Congress Party after the bifurcation of the state, stating that Congress was the main party responsible for the bifurcation.

She made her entry into politics, first becoming a member of the Mandal Parishad Territorial Constituency (MPTC) in 1996 and then became a member of the Zilla Parishad Territorial Constituency (ZPTC) in 2001.
