= Y. Ramavaram =

Yarlagadda Ramavaram Y. Ramavaram
- Village
- Interactive map of Yarlagadda Ramavaram
- Location in Andhra Pradesh, India
- Coordinates: 17°41′16″N 81°57′33″E
- Country: India
- State: Andhra Pradesh
- District: Polavaram
- Talukas: Yarlagadda Ramavaram

Area
  - Total: 773.23 km^{2} (298.55 sq mi)

Languagas
  - Official: Telugu
- Time zone: UTC+5:30 (IST)
- Vehicle Registration: AP05 (Former); AP39 (from 30 January 2019)

Yarlagadda Ramavaram, commonly known as Y. Ramavaram, is a village in Yarlagadda Ramavaram mandal, which is located in Polavaram district of Andhra Pradesh state, India.
