= Pamula Pushpa Sreevani =

Indian politician (born 1986)

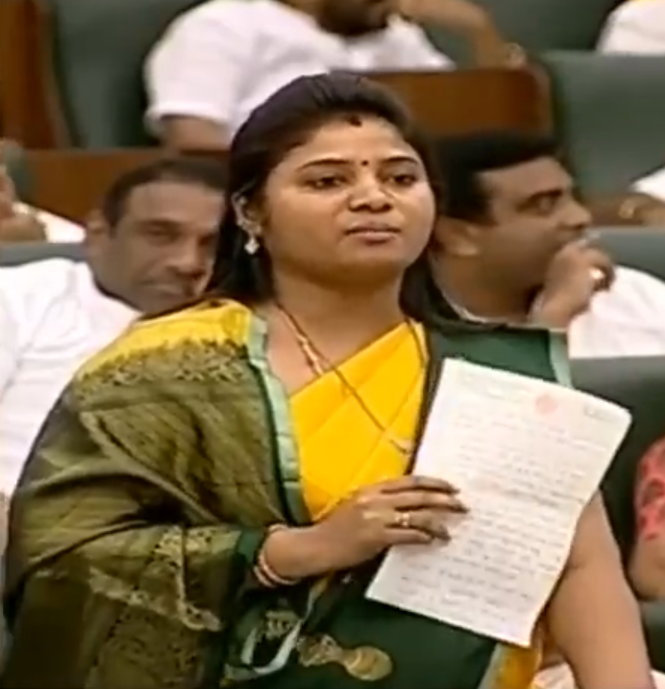

Member of the Andhra Pradesh Legislative Assembly
- In office 2014–2024
- Preceded by: Veera Vara Todarmal Janardhan Thatraj
- Succeeded by: Toyyaka Jagadeshwari
- Constituency: Kurupam

8th Deputy Chief Minister of Andhra Pradesh
- In office 8 June 2019 – 7 April 2022 Serving with Amzath Basha Shaik Bepari; K. Narayana Swamy; Pilli Subhash Chandra Bose; Alla Nani; Dharmana Krishna Das
- Preceded by: Nimmakayala Chinarajappa; K. E. Krishnamurthy
- Succeeded by: Rajanna Dora Peedika

Minister of Tribal Welfare Government of Andhra Pradesh
- In office 8 June 2019 – 7 April 2022
- Preceded by: Kidari Sravan Kumar
- Succeeded by: Rajanna Dora Peedika

Personal details
- Born: 22 June 1986 (age 40) Doramamidi
- Party: YSR Congress Party
- Spouse: Sathrucharla Parikshith Raju
- Education: Bachelor of Education, Bachelor of Science, Surya Degree College, Jangareddygudem (2003–2008), K.R.N.V College, Visakhapatnam (2007)
- Occupation: Politician

Pamula Pushpa Sreevani is an Indian politician who served as the 8th deputy Chief Minister and minister of Tribal Welfare Department of Andhra Pradesh from 8 June 2019 to 7 April 2022. She is a Member of the Andhra Pradesh Legislative Assembly from Kurupam constituency. She is member of the YSR Congress Party.

In the 2014 Andhra Pradesh Legislative Assembly elections, she received 55,435 votes (42.3%). She received a further 74,527 votes (53.7%) in the 2019 elections.

In June 2019, she became one of the five Deputy Chief Ministers of Andhra Pradesh in the Y. S. Jaganmohan Reddy-led cabinet and was also given a post of the Minister of Tribal Welfare.

Her TikTok video on YS Jagan went viral.

== Electoral history ==
=== Legislative Assembly Election ===
Year	Constituency	Party	Votes	%	Opponent	Party	Votes	%	Result	Margin	%
2024	Kurupam	YSRCP	59,855	30.76	Jagadeeswari Thoyaka	TDP	83,355	42.83	Lost	-23,500	-12.07
2019	Kurupam	YSRCP	74,527	40.45	Veera Vara Thodramal	TDP	47,925	26.01	Won	+26,602	14.44
2014	Kurupam	YSRCP	55,435	31.45	Janardhan Thatraj	TDP	36,352	20.62	Won	+19,083	10.83
