= Thimmapuram, Tamil Nadu =

Thimmapuram
- village
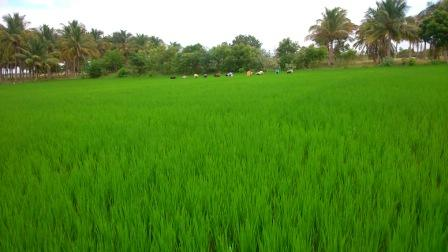
- Interactive map of Thimmapuram
- Country: India
- State: Tamil Nadu
- District: Virudhunagar
- State capital: Chennai

Area
  - Total: 6.32 km^{2} (2.44 sq mi)
- Elevation: 23 m (75 ft)

Population
  - Total: 2,000 (approx.)
  - Density: 320/km^{2} (820/sq mi)

Languages
  - Official: Tamil
- Time zone: UTC+5:30 (IST)
- PIN: 626106
- Nearest city: Madurai

Thimmapuram is a village in Kariyapatti Taluk in Virudhunagar District of Tamil Nadu State, India. Its nearest town is Kariyapatti which is 14 km away. Mostly people depend on farming and the nearby villages sell their produce using the railway station present. It is 6 km away from the village A Muukulam where it has better educational and other facilities. Madurai and Virudhunagar are the nearby cities to Thimmapuram.
