= Kothapalli Geetha =

Indian politician

Member of Parliament for Araku
- In office 16 May 2014 – 23 May 2019
- Preceded by: Kishore Chandra Deo
- Succeeded by: Goddeti Madhavi
- Constituency: Araku

Personal details
- Born: 4 February 1971 (age 55) Thimmapuram, East Godavari, Andhra Pradesh
- Party: Bhartiya Janata Party
- Other political affiliations: YSR Congress Party (before 2019), Independent
- Spouse: Paruchuri Rama Koteshwar Rao
- Children: 2
- Education: Bachelor of Arts (1989), Bachelor of Education (1990)

Kothapalli Geetha (born 4 February 1971) is an Indian Politician and a former member of parliament from Araku (Lok Sabha constituency), Andhra Pradesh. She won the 2014 Indian general election from Araku Constituency, a reserved Scheduled Tribe (ST) seat representing Yuvajana Sramika Rythu Congress Party (YSRCP). She started the Jana Jagruti Party in 2018 but later joined the Bharatiya Janata Party in 2019.

== Early life and education ==
Geetha was born in Thimmapuram, East Godavari, Andhra Pradesh. She was born to Kothapalli Jacob and Lizzamma. She married P. R. Koteswara Rao on 28 August 1989. She has a son and a daughter. Geetha completed her Bachelor of Arts in 1989, Bachelor of Education in 1990, both from Andhra University.

== Political career ==
Geetha was elected as an MP from Araku (Lok Sabha constituency) as YSRCP candidate from the (ST) community. She started, the Jana Jagruti Party, a new political party on 24 August 2018 with the aim of challenging the state's caste politics. In June 2019, She joined the BJP in a meeting with Amit Shah and Ram Madhav.

A petition was filed against Geetha in 2016 claiming that she was not a member of the ST community as she contested in the general elections 2014 in a reserved seat for ST community from Araku Lok Sabha Constituency and won the elections. An investigation committee formed for the probe and the district magistrate stated that she did not belong to the ST community.

== Lawsuits ==
=== Punjab National Bank case ===
The Central Bureau of Investigation (CBI) on 30 June 2015 filed a chargesheet against Geetha and her husband, the managing director of Visweswara Infrastructure, and three others for alleged criminal conspiracy to defraud a branch of the Punjab National Bank in Hyderabad up to ₹42 crore. The CBI reported that the accused gave wrong details to the bank and allegedly cheated the bank which led to the bank losing ₹42.79 crore. PNB sued Geetha and her husband P Ramakoteswar Rao and the Telangana high court stayed the five-year jail sentence awarded to them in the Punjab National Bank loan fraud case by CBI court and granted them bail. But the loan has been repaid with full interest and satisfaction of PNB and PNB has filed a full satisfaction memo which is listed for quash in the High Court of Telangana.
