= Gummadi Sandhya Rani =

Indian politician

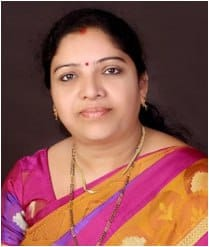

Minister of Women & Child Welfare Government of Andhra Pradesh
- Incumbent
- Assumed office 12 June 2024
- Governor: S. Abdul Nazeer
- Chief Minister: N. Chandrababu Naidu
- Preceded by: K. V. Ushashri Charan

Minister of Tribal Welfare Government of Andhra Pradesh
- Incumbent
- Assumed office 12 June 2024
- Governor: S. Abdul Nazeer
- Chief Minister: N. Chandrababu Naidu
- Preceded by: Rajanna Dora Peedika

Member of the Andhra Pradesh Legislative Assembly
- Incumbent
- Assumed office 4 June 2024
- Preceded by: Rajanna Dora Peedika
- Constituency: Salur

Member of the Andhra Pradesh Legislative Council
- In office 30 March 2015 – 29 March 2021
- Constituency: Elected by MLAs

Gummadi Sandhya Rani is an Indian politician from Andhra Pradesh. She is a member of Telugu Desam Party. She has been elected as the Member of the Legislative Assembly representing the Salur Assembly constituency in Parvathipuram Manyam district. She won the 2024 Andhra Pradesh Legislative Assembly election. In June 2024, she was inducted into the Fourth N. Chandrababu Naidu ministry.

== Early life and education ==
Rani is from Salur, Parvathipuram Manyam district, Andhra Pradesh, India. She married Jayakumar. She is a science graduate.

== Political career ==
Rani lost the assembly elections twice and the parliamentary election once. She first contested from the Salur Assembly Constituency in the erstwhile Parvathipuram Manyam district in the 2009 Andhra Pradesh Legislative Assembly election but lost to Rajanna Dora Peedika of Indian National Congress by a narrow margin of 1,656 votes. Later, TDP candidates lost in two more elections to the same candidate. She won from the same seat in the 2024 Andhra Pradesh Legislative Assembly election on the Telugu Desam Party ticket. In 2024, she polled 80,211 votes and defeated her nearest rival and three time MLA, Peedika Rajanna Dora of YSR Congress Party, by a margin of 13,733 votes.

On 18 June 2024, she went to the secretariat and took charge as the Tribal Welfare and Women and Child Welfare Minister. After taking charge, she said that bike ambulances would be introduced as the regular ambulance services were not able to reach some tribal areas in the hilly regions. She also promised that "facilitation centres would be constructed for pregnant tribal women".
