= International Higher School of Medicine =

International Higher School of Medicine (IHSM)
- Международная Высшая Школа Медицины
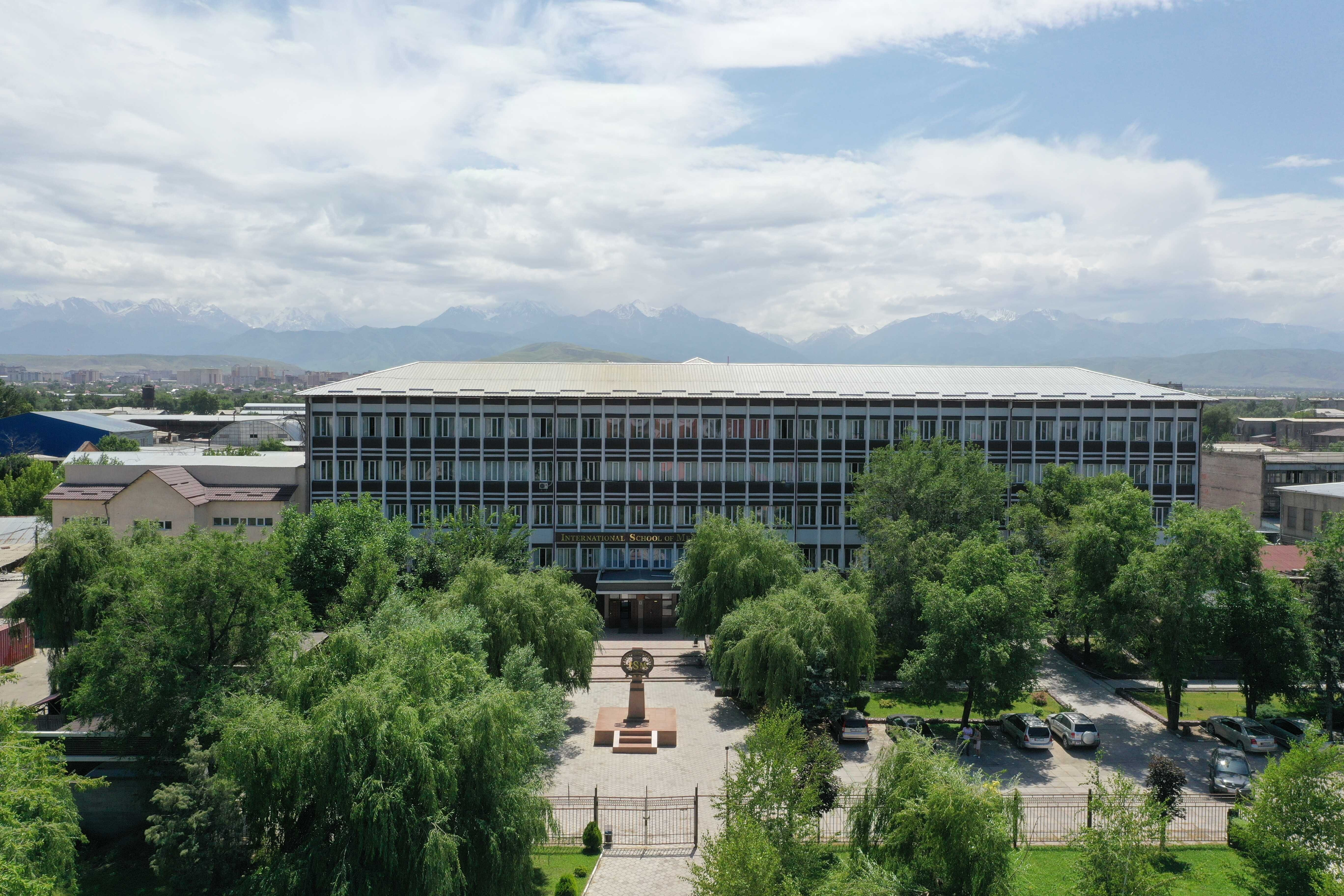
- Central Campus
- Established: 23 June 2003; 23 years ago
- Founder: Чынгышбаев Шамиль Мукашевич
- Rector: Stalbek M. Akhunbaev
- Location: 1F, Intergelpo Street, Bishkek, Kyrgyzstan
- Nickname: IHSM
- Website: internationalschoolofmedicine.com
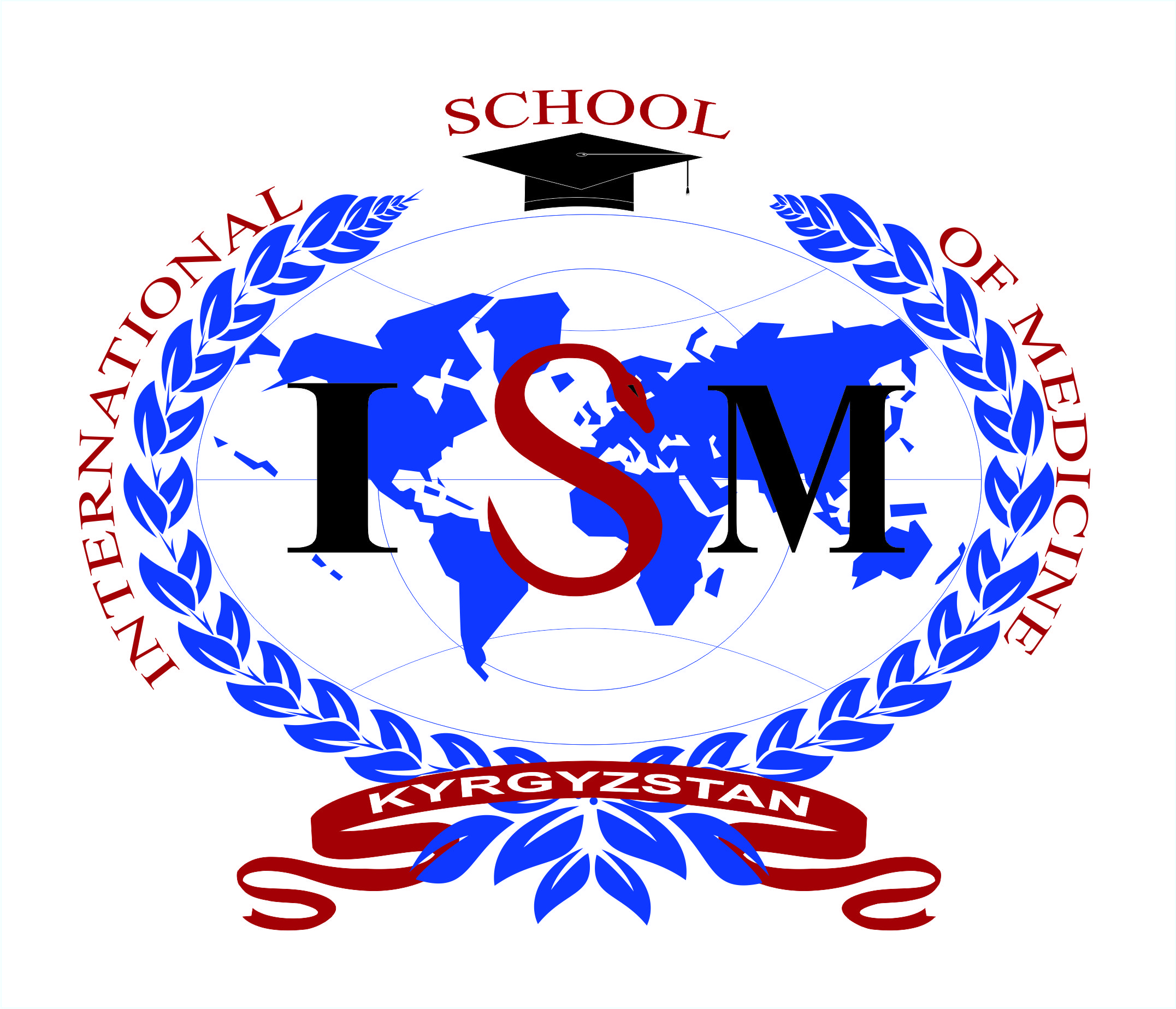

The International Higher School of Medicine (IHSM) is a Medical University MBBS in Kyrgyzstan, Central Asia, recognized by international medical education organizations. The IHSM was established in 2003 as part of a strategy to reform the education system and increase the competitiveness of domestic universities. The first rector of the School was Shamil M. Chyngyshpaev.

== Reputation and Ranking ==
The International Higher School of Medicine (IHSM) has proudly secured 2nd place in the 2025 Ranking of Educational Programs in the field of General Medicine, achieving a total score of 492.80 points. The ranking was conducted by EdNet Agency for Quality Assurance in Education, a leading independent accreditation body in the Kyrgyz Republic. The evaluation was based on the program's quality and performance, using internationally recognized assessment methods. In 2026, IHSM also received a six-year state accreditation from the Ministry of Education and Science of the Kyrgyz Republic, reaffirming its compliance with national educational standards and commitment to quality medical education.
