= Palakonda Assembly constituency =

Constituency of the Andhra Pradesh Legislative Assembly, India

Coordinates: 18.60°N 83.76°E

Palakonda
- Constituency No. 10 for the Andhra Pradesh Legislative Assembly
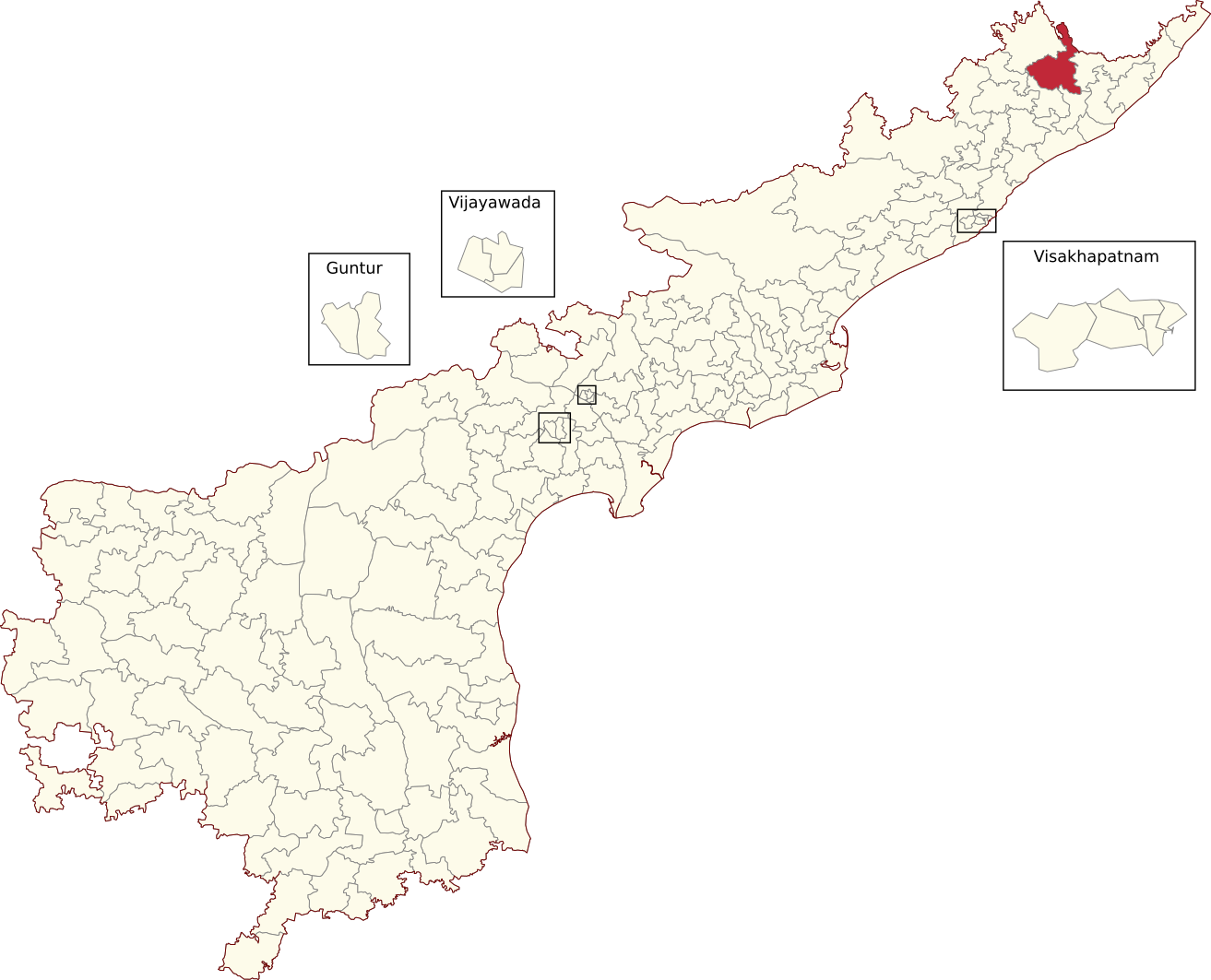
- Location of Palakonda Assembly constituency within Andhra Pradesh

Constituency details
- Country: India
- Region: South India
- State: Andhra Pradesh
- District: Parvathipuram Manyam
- Lok Sabha constituency: Araku
- Established: 1951
- Total electors: 184,414
- Reservation: ST

Member of Legislative Assembly
- 16th Andhra Pradesh Legislative Assembly
- Incumbent Nimmaka Jaya Krishna
- Party: JSP
- Alliance: NDA
- Elected year: 2024

Palakonda is a Scheduled Tribe reserved constituency in Parvathipuram Manyam district of Andhra Pradesh that elects representatives to the Andhra Pradesh Legislative Assembly in India. It is one of the seven assembly segments of Araku Lok Sabha constituency.

Nimmaka Jaya Krishna is the current MLA of the constituency, having won the 2024 Andhra Pradesh Legislative Assembly election from Janasena Party. As of 2019, there are a total of 184,414 electors in the constituency. The constituency was established in 1951, as per the Delimitation Orders (1951).

== Mandals ==
The four mandals that form the assembly constituency are:

Mandal
Palakonda
Seethampeta
Veeraghattam
Bhamini

Mandals in Palakonda Assembly Constituency

== Members of the Legislative Assembly ==
Year	Member	Political party
1952	Palavasa Sangam Naiudu	Indian National Congress
1955	Pydi Narasimhapparao	Independent
1962	Kemburu Suryanarayana Naidu	Swatantra Party
1967	J. Joji	Swatantra Party
1972	Kottapalli Narasayya	Indian National Congress
1978	Kambala Rajaratnam	Janata Party
1983	Syama Rao Gonipati	Telugu Desam Party
1985	Tale Bhadrayya	Telugu Desam Party
1989	P. J. Amruta Kumari	Indian National Congress
1994	Tale Bhadrayya	Telugu Desam Party
1999	P. J. Amruta Kumari	Bharatiya Janata Party
2004	Kambala Jogulu	Telugu Desam Party
2009	Nimmaka Sugreevulu	Indian National Congress
2014	Viswasarayi Kalavathi	YSR Congress Party
2019	Viswasarayi Kalavathi	YSR Congress Party
2024	Nimmaka Jaya Krishna	Janasena Party

== Election results ==
=== 2024 ===
2024 Andhra Pradesh Legislative Assembly election: Palakonda
Party	Candidate	Votes	%	±%
JSP	Jayakrishna Nimmaka	75,208	50.69	▲
YSRCP	Viswasarayi Kalavathi	61,917	41.73	▼
INC	Chanti Babu Savara	2,041	1.04	−−
NOTA	None of the above	4,260	2.18	▼
Majority		13,291	9.96	
Turnout		1,48,375	75.83	▲
Registered electors		1,95,673		▲
JSP gain from YSRCP		Swing		

=== 2019 ===
2019 Andhra Pradesh Legislative Assembly election: Palakonda
Party	Candidate	Votes	%	±%
YSRCP	Viswasarayi Kalavathi	72,054	38.95	▼
TDP	Nimmaka Jaya Krishna	54,074	29.23	▲
NOTA	None of the above	3,548	1.91	▲
CPI	D. V. G. Sankara Rao	3,343	1.83	
Majority		17,980	9.72	
Turnout		1,36,712	73.91	▲
Registered electors		1,84,967		▲
YSRCP hold		Swing		

=== 2014 ===
2014 Andhra Pradesh Legislative Assembly election: Palakonda
Party	Candidate	Votes	%	±%
YSRCP	VISWASARAYI KALAVATHI	55,337	32.89	New
TDP	JAYA KRISHNA NIMMAKA	53,717	31.92	
CPI(M)	PATTIKA KUMAR	3,165	1.88	
INC	NIMMAKA SUGREEVULU	3,162	1.88	
	Remaining	4,665	2.77	
NOTA	None of the above	1,382	0.82	
Turnout		1,21,428	72.17	
Registered electors		1,68,256		
Majority		1,620	0.96	
YSRCP gain from INC		Swing		

=== 1952 ===
1952 Madras Legislative Assembly election: Palakonda
Party	Candidate	Votes	%	±%
INC	Palavasa Sangam Naiudu	15,942	42.22	42.22
KLP	Meesala Rajaratnam Naidu	14,296	37.86	
Independent	Kodinarayananaswami	5,265	13.94	
Socialist Party (India)	Vavilapalli Satyanarayanana Naiudu	2,256	5.97	
Margin of victory		1,646	4.36	
Turnout		37,759	56.20	
Registered electors		67,182		
INC win (new seat)				

=== 1955 ===
1955 Andhra State Legislative Assembly election: Palakonda
Party	Candidate	Votes	%	±%
Independent	Pydi Narasimhapparao	12,267	35.96	
Independent	Kemburu Suryanarayana Naidu	11,490	33.69	
KLP	Peesapati Pundrareekakchacharyulu	10,352	30.35	
Majority		777	2.27	▼2.09
Turnout		34,109	58.89	▲2.69
Independent hold		Swing		

=== 1962 ===
1962 Andhra Pradesh Legislative Assembly election: Palakonda
Party	Candidate	Votes	%	±%
SWA	Kemburu Suryanarayana Naidu	22,555	56.84	▲23.15
INC	Payedi Narasimhapparao	17,126	43.15	▲7.19
Majority		5,429	13.69	▲11.42
Turnout		39,681		
SWA gain from Independent		Swing	▲10.9	

=== 1967 ===
1967 Andhra Pradesh Legislative Assembly election: Palakonda
Party	Candidate	Votes	%	±%
SWA	J. Joji	17,184	43.70	▼13.14
INC	K. Narasayya	15,289	38.88	▼4.27
Independent	Pinnta Jammayya	6,850	17.42	New
Majority		1,895	4.82	▼8.87
Turnout		39,323	61.04	
SWA hold		Swing	▲14.75	

=== 1972 ===
1972 Andhra Pradesh Legislative Assembly election: Palakonda
Party	Candidate	Votes	%	±%
INC	Kottapalli Narasayya	25,544	71.07	▲32.19
Independent	Pinnta Jammayya	6,044	16.82	▼0.6
Independent	Boddepalli Narasimhulu	4,355	12.12	New
Majority		19,500	54.25	▲49.43
Turnout		35,943	45.97	▼24.78
INC gain from SWA		Swing		

=== 1978 ===
1978 Andhra Pradesh Legislative Assembly election: Palakonda
Party	Candidate	Votes	%	±%
JP	Kambala Rajaratnam	24,145	45.1	
INC(I)	Daramana Adinarayana	12,387	23.1	▼47.97
INC	Pagadalamma Sukka	10,319	19.3	▼51.77
Independent	Dunga Subhashiniraju	3,278	6.1	
RPI(K)	Nuthulapati Padmavati	2,668	5.0	New
Independent	Samala Madhavarao	802	1.5	
Majority		11,758	21.2	▼33.05
Turnout		55,433	69.9	▲23.93
JP gain from INC		Swing		

=== 1983 ===
1983 Andhra Pradesh Legislative Assembly election: Palakonda
Party	Candidate	Votes	%	±%
TDP	Syama Rao Gonipati	34,670	63.2	
INC	Jampu Latchayya	15,585	28.4	▲9.1
LKD	Uttaravilli Ramakrishna	1,500	2.7	
Independent	Tandara Rayappa	792	1.4	
Independent	Eswaramma Gandi	762	1.4	
Independent	Varahalamma Bonela	634	1.2	
Independent	Sanjeevu Jami	623	1.1	
Independent	N. Balapapadamavathi	188	0.3	
Independent	Raman Alikanna	139	0.3	
Majority		19,085	34.1	▲12.9
Turnout		55,951	68.3	▼1.6
TDP gain from JP		Swing		

=== 1985 ===
1985 Andhra Pradesh Legislative Assembly election: Palakonda
Party	Candidate	Votes	%	±%
TDP	Tale Bhadrayya	37,858	69.4	
INC	P. J. Amruta Kumari	14,954	27.4	▼1
Independent	Dalappayya Kuppili	1,067	2.0	
Independent	Makayya Koppala	699	1.3	
Majority		22,904	41.2	▲7.1
Turnout		55,590	63.9	▼4.4
TDP hold		Swing		

=== 1989 ===
1989 Andhra Pradesh Legislative Assembly election: Palakonda
Party	Candidate	Votes	%	±%
INC	P. J. Amruta Kumari	35,027	49.8	▲22.4
TDP	Satteyya Gondela	33,852	48.1	▼21.3
BSP	ApparaO Kolli	554	0.8	
Independent	Yarrayya Geddapu	451	0.6	
Independent	Sanjeevu Jami	263	0.4	New
Independent	Gonepati Syamarao	252	0.4	
Majority		1,175	1.6	▼39.6
Turnout		74,213	70.7	▲6.8
INC gain from TDP		Swing		

=== 1994 ===
1994 Andhra Pradesh Legislative Assembly election: Palakonda
Party	Candidate	Votes	%	±%
TDP	Tale Bhadrayya	45,818	62.3	▲14.2
INC	P. J. Amruta Kumari	24,844	33.8	▼16
BJP	Matha Chittibabu	1,266	1.7	
BSP	Prema Karmanandam	763	1.0	▲0.2
SSP	Nuthulapati Rao	455	0.6	New
National Students Party	Mulla Udaya Kumar	296	0.4	New
Independent	Matcha Manyalu	144	0.2	
Majority		20,974	27.8	▲26.2
Turnout		75,574	68.0	▼2.7
TDP gain from INC		Swing		

=== 1999 ===
1999 Andhra Pradesh Legislative Assembly election: Palakonda
Party	Candidate	Votes	%	±%
BJP	P. J. Amruta Kumari	24,253	33.1	▲31.4
TDP	Tale Bhadrayya	23,057	31.5	▼30.8
INC	Rajaratnam Kambala	23,021	31.4	▼2.4
Independent	Raju Pinniniti	1,471	2.0	
Anna Telugu Desam Party	Gavarayya Madapala	1,302	1.8	New
Independent	Parasilli Alwar	214	0.3	
Majority		1,196	1.5	▼26.3
Turnout		77,800	64.4	▼3.6
BJP gain from TDP		Swing		

=== 2004 ===
2004 Andhra Pradesh Legislative Assembly election: Palakonda
Party	Candidate	Votes	%	±%
TDP	Kambala Jogulu	42,327	53.3	▲21.8
INC	T. Rajababu	30,703	38.7	▲7.3
Majority		11,624	14.7	▲13.3
Turnout		79,347	72.5	▲8.1
TDP gain from BJP		Swing	▲10.9	

=== 2009 ===
2009 Andhra Pradesh Legislative Assembly election: Palakonda
Party	Candidate	Votes	%	±%
INC	Nimmaka Sugreevulu	45,909	42.4	▲3.7
TDP	Gopalarao Nimmaka	29,759	27.5	▼25.8
PRP	Viswasarayi Kalavathi	21,725	20.1	New
Majority		16,150	14.9	▲0.2
Turnout		1,08,295	69.8	▼2.7
INC gain from TDP		Swing	▲14.75	

== See also ==
- List of constituencies of Andhra Pradesh Legislative Assembly
