= Salur Assembly constituency =

Constituency of the Andhra Pradesh Legislative Assembly, India

Coordinates: 18.52°N 83.20°E

Salur
- Constituency No. 13 for the Andhra Pradesh Legislative Assembly
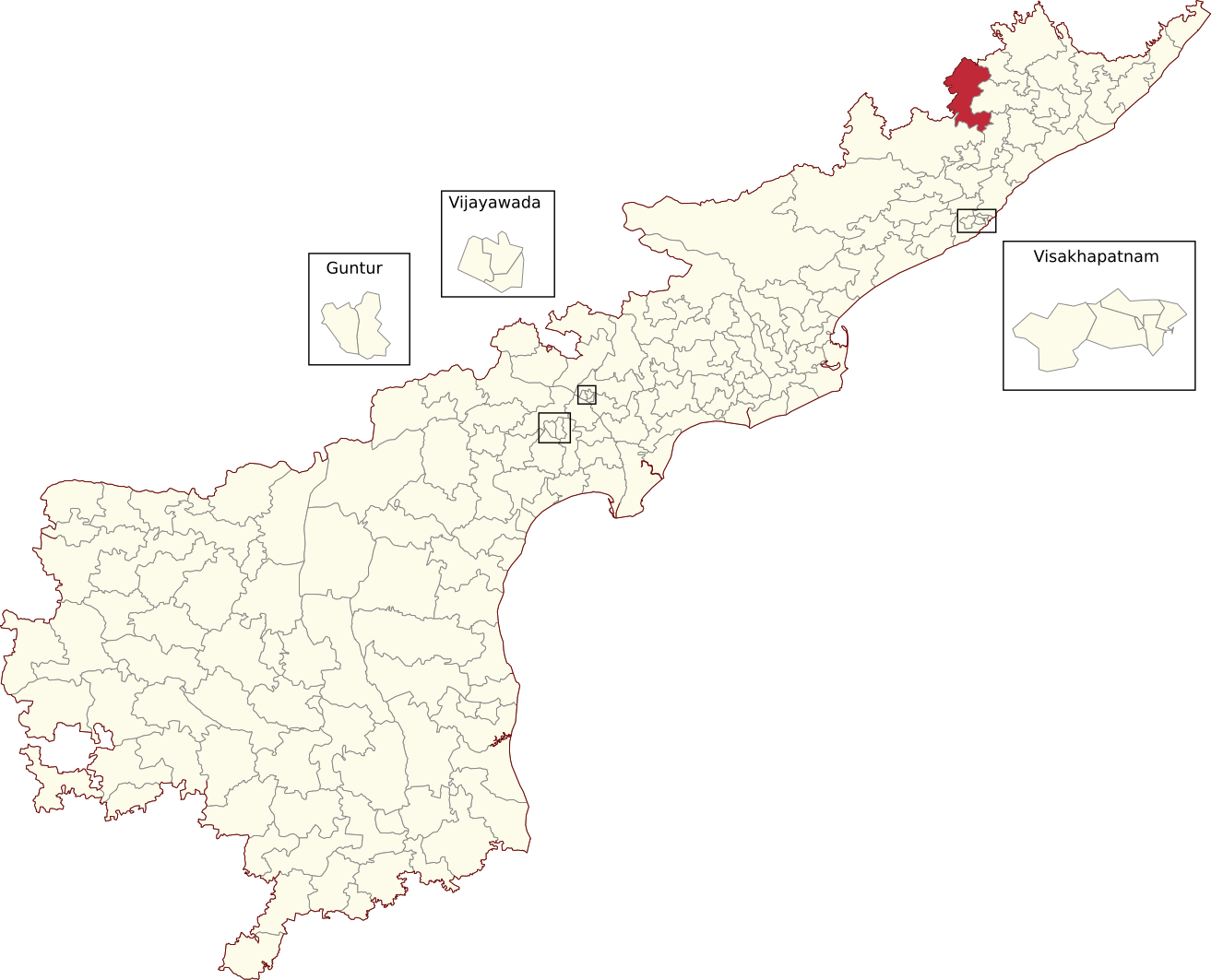
- Location of Salur Assembly constituency within Andhra Pradesh

Constituency details
- Country: India
- Region: South India
- State: Andhra Pradesh
- District: Parvathipuram Manyam
- Lok Sabha constituency: Araku
- Established: 1951
- Total electors: 190,619
- Reservation: ST

Member of Legislative Assembly
- 16th Andhra Pradesh Legislative Assembly
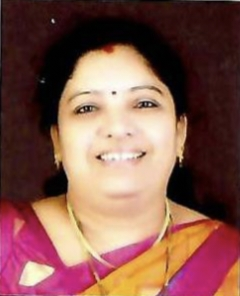
- Incumbent Gummadi Sandhya Rani
- Party: TDP
- Alliance: NDA
- Elected year: 2024

Salur is a Scheduled Tribe reserved constituency in Parvathipuram Manyam district of Andhra Pradesh that elects representatives to the Andhra Pradesh Legislative Assembly in India. It is one of the seven assembly segments of Araku Lok Sabha constituency.

Gummadi Sandhya Rani is the current MLA of the constituency, having won the 2024 Andhra Pradesh Legislative Assembly election from Telugu Desam Party. As of 2019, there are a total of 190,619 electors in the constituency. The constituency was established in 1951, as per the Delimitation Orders (1951).

== Mandals ==
The four mandals that form the assembly constituency are:

Mandal
Salur
Pachipenta
Mentada
Makkuva

Mandals in Saluru Assembly Constituency

== Members of the Legislative Assembly ==
Year	Member	Political party
1952	Kumisetti Venkatanarayana Dora	Krishikar Lok Party
1955	A. Yerukunaidu	Praja Socialist Party
1962	Lakshmi Narasimha Sanyasi Raju	Independent
1967	B. Rajayya	Independent
1972	Mutyallu Janni	Indian National Congress
1978	S. R. T. P. S. Veerapa Raju	Communist Party of India
1983	B. Rajaiah	Telugu Desam Party
1985	B. Rajaiah	Telugu Desam Party
1989	Lakshmi Narasimha Sanyasi Raju	Indian National Congress
1994	Rajendra Prathap Bhanj Deo	Telugu Desam Party
1999	Rajendra Prathap Bhanj Deo	Telugu Desam Party
2004	Rajendra Prathap Bhanj Deo	Telugu Desam Party
2009	Rajanna Dora Peedika	Indian National Congress
2014	Rajanna Dora Peedika	YSR Congress Party
2019	Rajanna Dora Peedika	YSR Congress Party
2024	Gummadi Sandhya Rani	Telugu Desam Party

== Election results ==
=== 2024 ===
2024 Andhra Pradesh Legislative Assembly election: Salur (ST)
Party	Candidate	Votes	%	±%
TDP	Gummadi Sandhya Rani	80,211	50.65	
YSRCP	Peedika Rajanna Dora	66,478	41.98	
NOTA	None of the Above	5,743	3.63	
INC	Muvvala Puspharao	2,239	1.41	
Majority		13,733	8.67	
Turnout		158,355	77.29	
TDP gain from YSRCP		Swing		

=== 2019 ===
2019 Andhra Pradesh Legislative Assembly election: Salur (ST)
Party	Candidate	Votes	%	±%
YSRCP	Peedika Rajanna Dora	78,430	51.70	
TDP	R. P. Bhanj Deo	58,401	38.49	
NOTA	None of the Above	4,874	3.21	
JSP	Bonela Govindamma	3,308	2.18	
BJP	Kondagorri Uday Kumar	3,268	2.15	
INC	Rayala Sundara Rao	1,737	1.14	
Majority		20,029	13.21	
Turnout		151,713	79.46	
YSRCP hold		Swing		

=== 2014 ===
2014 Andhra Pradesh Legislative Assembly election: Salur (ST)
Party	Candidate	Votes	%	±%
YSRCP	Peedika Rajanna Dora	63,755	47.28	
TDP	Rajendra Pratap Bhanj Deo	58,758	43.57	
INC	Andra Baba	4,666	3.46	
CPI(M)	Apparao Sidarapu	2,183	1.62	
CPI	Ramu Janni	2,112	1.57	
IND	Uyaka Mutyalu	1,898	1.41	
NOTA	None of the Above	1,485	1.10	
Majority		4,997	3.71	
Turnout		134,857	76.98	
YSRCP gain from INC		Swing		

=== 2009 ===
2009 Andhra Pradesh Legislative Assembly election: Salur
Party	Candidate	Votes	%	±%
INC	Rajanna Dora Peedika	49,517	40.94	−7.74
TDP	Gummadi Sandhya Rani	47,861	39.57	−11.75
PRP	T. V. Hanumantha Rao	13,479	11.14	
Majority		1,656	1.37	
Turnout		121,002	71.57	−3.07
INC gain from TDP		Swing		

=== 2004 ===
2004 Andhra Pradesh Legislative Assembly election: Salur (ST)
Party	Candidate	Votes	%	±%
TDP	R. P. Bhanj Deo	48,580	51.32	
INC	Peedika Rajanna Dora	46,087	48.68	
Majority		2,493	2.63	
Turnout				
TDP hold		Swing		

=== 1999 ===
1999 Andhra Pradesh Legislative Assembly election: Salur (ST)
Party	Candidate	Votes	%	±%
TDP	R. P. Bhanj Deo	48,517	58.18	
INC	Sandhya Rani Gummidi	33,547	40.23	
IND	Uooyaka Mutyala	1,334	1.60	
Majority		14,970	17.95	
Turnout		83,398	72.12	
TDP hold		Swing		

=== 1994 ===
1994 Andhra Pradesh Legislative Assembly election: Salur (ST)
Party	Candidate	Votes	%	±%
TDP	Rajendra Pratap Bhanj Deo	54,702	66.13	
INC	Vikrama Chandra Sanyasi Raju	25,332	30.62	
BJP	Pakki Usharani	1,943	2.35	
Majority		29,370	35.51	
Turnout		82,722	72.92	
TDP gain from INC		Swing		

=== 1989 ===
1989 Andhra Pradesh Legislative Assembly election: Salur (ST)
Party	Candidate	Votes	%	±%
INC	Lakshmi Narasimha Sanyasi Raju	35,823	49.61	
TDP	R. P. Bhanj Dev	35,182	48.73	
IND	Janni Mutyalu	1,199	1.66	
Majority		641	0.89	
Turnout		72,204	72.35	
INC gain from TDP		Swing		

=== 1952 ===
1952 Madras Legislative Assembly election: Salur
Party	Candidate	Votes	%	±%
KLP	Kunichetti Dora	19,408	53.40%	
INC	A. Yerukunaidu	6,760	18.60%	18.60%
Socialist Party (India)	Alaganji Ramamurthy	6,231	17.14%	
Independent	Kottakki Chiranjividas	3,944	10.85%	
Margin of victory		12,648	34.80%	
Turnout		36,343	46.85%	
Registered electors		77,570		
KLP win (new seat)				

=== 1955 ===
1955 Andhra State Legislative Assembly election: Salur
Party	Candidate	Votes	%	±%
PSP	A. Yerukunaidu	19,204	22.56	New
INC	Kunichetti Dora	14,674	17.24	▼1.36
INC	Boina Rajayya	13,473	15.83	▼2.77
PSP	Dippala Dora	8,774	10.31	
Independent	Andrarama Bahadur	6,168	7.25	
Independent	Raja Dugaraja	5,198	6.11	
Independent	Balaga Narayana	5,179	6.08	
Independent	Sankaravamsam Deo	4,287	5.04	
Independent	Gadipalli Parayya	4,286	5.03	
Independent	Kota Naidu	1,987	2.33	
Independent	Marpina Naidu	1,896	2.23	
Majority		18,003	21.15	▼13.65
Turnout		85,126	83.31	▲36.46
Praja Socialist Party & Indian National Congress gain from KLP		Swing		

=== 1962 ===
1962 Andhra Pradesh Legislative Assembly election: Salur
Party	Candidate	Votes	%	±%
Independent	Lakshmi Raju	18,857	66.99	New
INC	A. Yerukunaidu	9,288	33.0	▼0.07
Majority		9,569	33.99	▼4.4
Turnout		28,145		
Independent gain from Praja Socialist Party & Indian National Congress		Swing		

=== 1967 ===
1967 Andhra Pradesh Legislative Assembly election: Salur
Party	Candidate	Votes	%	±%
Independent	B. Rajayya	17,679	43.11	New
SWA	J. Mutyalu	10,323	25.17	New
INC	D. Suridora	7,692	18.76	▼14.24
CPI	P.V. Swamy	5,318	12.97	New
Majority		7,356	17.94	▼16.05
Turnout		41,012	57.45	
Independent hold		Swing		

=== 1972 ===
1972 Andhra Pradesh Legislative Assembly election: Salur
Party	Candidate	Votes	%	±%
INC	Mutyallu Janni	24,787	67.14	▲48.38
ABJS	S. R. T. P. S. Raju	12,132	32.86	New
Majority		12,655	34.28	▲16.34
Turnout		36,919	42.48	▼14.97
INC gain from Independent		Swing		

=== 1978 ===
1978 Andhra Pradesh Legislative Assembly election: Salur
Party	Candidate	Votes	%	±%
CPI	S. R. T. P. S. Veerapa Raju	29,126	54.3	New
JP	Lakshmi Raju	24,477	45.7	New
Majority		4,649	8.3	▼25.98
Turnout		56,227	72.0	▲29.52
CPI gain from INC		Swing		

=== 1983 ===
1983 Andhra Pradesh Legislative Assembly election: Salur
Party	Candidate	Votes	%	±%
TDP	Boniya Rajaiah	32,684	61.2	New
INC	Dukka Appanna	16,560	31.0	New
CPI	Vadigala Pentayya	4,209	7.9	▼46.4
Majority		16,124	29.4	▲21.1
Turnout		54,835	63.7	▼8.3
TDP gain from CPI		Swing		

=== 1985 ===
1985 Andhra Pradesh Legislative Assembly election: Salur
Party	Candidate	Votes	%	±%
TDP	Boina Rajayya	33,348	56.5	▼4.7
INC	L.N. Raju	25,712	43.5	▲12.5
Majority		7,636	12.6	▼16.8
Turnout		60,576	68.2	▲4.5
TDP hold		Swing		

=== 1989 ===
1989 Andhra Pradesh Legislative Assembly election: Salur
Party	Candidate	Votes	%	±%
INC	Lakshmi Raju	35,823	49.6	▲6.1
TDP	R. P. Bhanj Deo	35,182	48.7	▼7.8
Independent	Janni Mutyalu	1,199	1.7	
Majority		641	0.8	▼11.8
Turnout		76,484	72.4	▲4.2
INC gain from TDP		Swing		

=== 1994 ===
1994 Andhra Pradesh Legislative Assembly election: Salur
Party	Candidate	Votes	%	±%
TDP	R. P. Bhanj Deo	54,702	66.1	▲17.4
INC	Vikrama Raju	25,332	30.6	▼19
BJP	Pakki Usharani	1,943	2.4	
Independent	Appanna Dukka	286	0.4	
Independent	Kolaka George	259	0.3	
Independent	Kumari Jayalaxmi	200	0.2	
Majority		29,370	34.5	▲33.7
Turnout		85,101	72.9	▲0.5
TDP gain from INC		Swing		

=== 1999 ===
1999 Andhra Pradesh Legislative Assembly election: Salur
Party	Candidate	Votes	%	±%
TDP	R. P. Bhanj Deo	48,517	58.2	−7.9
INC	Gummadi Sandhya Rani	33,547	40.2	+9.6
Independent	Mutyala Uooyaka	1,334	1.6	
Majority		14,970	17.3	−17.2
Turnout		86,427	72.1	−0.8
TDP hold		Swing		

=== 2004 ===
2004 Andhra Pradesh Legislative Assembly election: Salur
Party	Candidate	Votes	%	±%
TDP	R. P. Bhanj Deo	48,580	51.32	−6.86
INC	Rajanna Dora Peedika	46,087	48.68	+8.45
Majority		2,493	2.64	
Turnout		94,667	74.64	+2.52
TDP hold		Swing		

== See also ==
- List of constituencies of the Andhra Pradesh Legislative Assembly
