= Kurupam Assembly constituency =

Constituency of the Andhra Pradesh Legislative Assembly, India

Coordinates: 18.87°N 83.55°E

Kurupam
- Constituency No. 11 for the Andhra Pradesh Legislative Assembly
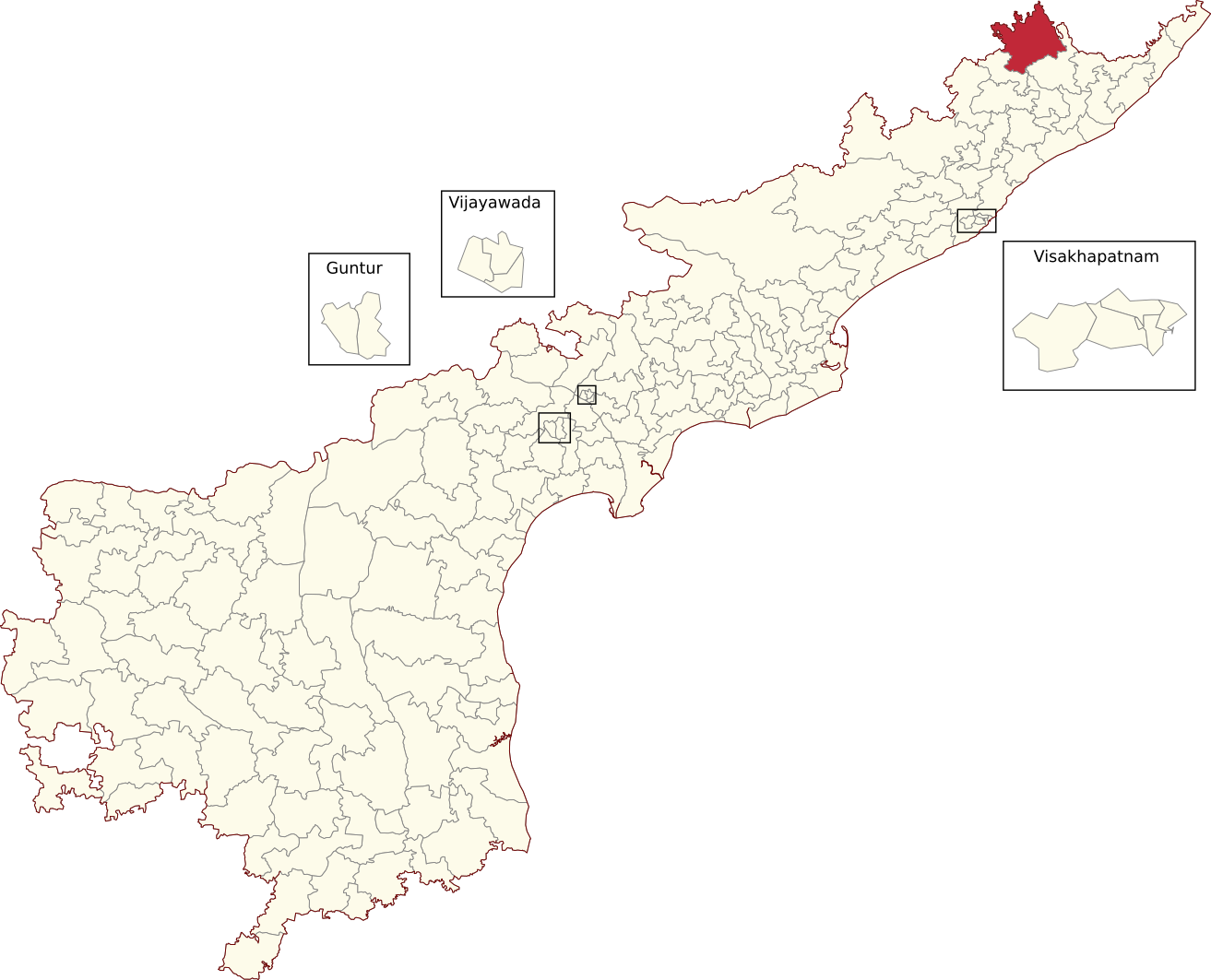
- Location of Kurupam Assembly constituency within Andhra Pradesh

Constituency details
- Country: India
- Region: South India
- State: Andhra Pradesh
- District: Parvathipuram Manyam
- Lok Sabha constituency: Araku
- Established: 2008
- Total electors: 183,830
- Reservation: ST

Member of Legislative Assembly
- 16th Andhra Pradesh Legislative Assembly
- Incumbent Jagadeeswari Thoyaka
- Party: TDP
- Alliance: NDA
- Elected year: 2024

Kurupam is a Scheduled Tribe reserved constituency in Parvathipuram Manyam district of Andhra Pradesh that elects representatives to the Andhra Pradesh Legislative Assembly in India. It is one of the seven assembly segments of Araku Lok Sabha constituency.

Jagadeeswari Thoyaka is the current MLA of the constituency, having won the 2024 Andhra Pradesh Legislative Assembly election from Telugu Desam Party. As of 2019, there are a total of 183,830 electors in the constituency. The constituency was established in 2008, as per the Delimitation Orders (2008).

== Mandals ==
The five mandals that form the assembly constituency are:

Mandal
Kurupam
Gummalaxmipuram
Jiyyammavalasa
Komarada
Garugubilli

Mandals in Kurupam Assembly Constituency

== Members of the Legislative Assembly ==
Year	Member	Political party
2024	Jagadeeswari Thoyaka	Telugu Desam Party
2019	Pushpasreevani Pamula	YSR Congress Party
2014	Pushpasreevani Pamula	YSR Congress Party
2009	Veera Vara Todarmal Janardhan Thatraj	Indian National Congress

== Election results ==
=== 2024 ===
2024 Andhra Pradesh Legislative Assembly election: Kurupam
Party	Candidate	Votes	%	±%
TDP	Jagadeeswari Thoyaka	83,355	42.83	
YSRCP	Pushpasreevani Pamula	59,855	30.76	
CPI(M)	Mandangi Ramana	3,923	2.02	
	Remaining	3,397	1.74	▼
NOTA	None of the above	4,761	2.45	
Turnout		1,55,291	79.79	
Registered electors		1,94,616		
Majority		23,500	15.14	
TDP gain from YSRCP		Swing		

=== 2019 ===
2019 Andhra Pradesh Legislative Assembly election: Kurupam
Party	Candidate	Votes	%	±%
YSRCP	Pushpasreevani Pamula	74,527	40.45	▲
TDP	VEERA VARA THODRAMAL NARA SIMHA PRIYA THATRAJ	47,925	26.01	▲
CPI(M)	Avinash Kumar Kolaka	8,605	4.67	▲
	Remaining	7,666	4.16	
NOTA	None Of The Above	4,535	2.46	▼
Turnout		1,43,258	77.75	▲
Registered electors		1,84,259		
Majority		26,602	14.44	▲
YSRCP hold		Swing		

=== 2014 ===
2014 Andhra Pradesh Legislative Assembly election: Kurupam
Party	Candidate	Votes	%	±%
YSRCP	Pushpasreevani Pamula	55,435	31.45	New
TDP	Janardhan Thatraj Veeravaratodramala	36,352	20.62	
Independent	JAYARAJU NIMMAKA	26,044	14.77	New
CPI(M)	KOLAKA LAXMANA MURTY	5,689	3.23	
	Remaining	7,657	4.34	
NOTA	None of the above	2,077	1.18	
Turnout		1,33,254	75.59	
Registered electors		1,76,271		
Majority		19,083	10.83	
YSRCP gain from INC		Swing		

=== 2009 ===
2009 Andhra Pradesh Legislative Assembly election: Kurupam
Party	Candidate	Votes	%	±%
INC	Janardhan Thatraj Veeravaratodramala	48,493	41.4	
PRP	Nimmaka Jaya raju	33,440	28.6	
CPI(M)	Kolaka Laxmana Murthy	23,707	20.3	
BJP	Nimmaka Vasudeva Rao	4,471	3.8	
BSP	Puvvala Saraswathi	2,584	2.2	
Majority		15,053	12.9	
Turnout		1,17,104	72.0	
INC win (new seat)				

== See also ==
- List of constituencies of the Andhra Pradesh Legislative Assembly
