= Bonela Vijaya Chandra =

Indian politician

Member of the Andhra Pradesh Legislative Assembly
- Incumbent
- Assumed office 2024
- Preceded by: Alajangi Jogarao
- Constituency: Parvathipuram

Personal details
- Party: Telugu Desam Party

Bonela Vijaya Chandra is an Indian politician from Andhra Pradesh. He is a member of the Andhra Pradesh Legislative Assembly representing the Telugu Desam Party from Parvathipuram Assembly constituency. He was elected in the 2024 Andhra Pradesh Legislative Assembly elections.

== Early life ==
Chandra is from Parvathipuram, Andhra Pradesh. He completed his B.Tech degree in biotechnology and environmental science in 2009 at ANITS, Visakhapatnam, which is affiliated with Andhra University. He belongs to Madiga community and is fluent in English, Telugu, Hindi, Kannada, and Tamil.

== Career ==
Bonela Vijaya Chandra was elected as a MLA for the first time from Parvathipuram Assembly constituency in the 2024 Andhra Pradesh Legislative Assembly election. He polled 83,905 votes and defeated his nearest rival and former MLA, Alajangi Jogarao of the YSR Congress Party, by a margin of 24,414 votes.

He played a pivotal role in securing a stop for the Visakhapatnam-Durg Vande Bharat Express at Parvathipuram. Initially, the train was set to halt only at Vizianagaram within Andhra Pradesh. Responding to local concerns, Vijaya Chandra met with Union Minister of State for Railways, V. Somanna, and the Railway Board, ensuring the addition of the halt. This development is expected to spur economic activity in Parvathipuram and benefit both local traders and devotees traveling to nearby temples.
