= Miriyala Sirisha Devi =

Indian politician

Member of the Andhra Pradesh Legislative Assembly
- Incumbent
- Assumed office 2024
- Preceded by: Nagulapalli Dhanalakshmi
- Constituency: Rampachodavaram

Personal details
- Born: 1994 (age 31–32)
- Party: Telugu Desam Party

Miriyala Sirisha Devi (born 1994) is an Indian politician from Andhra Pradesh. She is a first-time MLA from the Rampachodavaram Assembly constituency which is reserved for Scheduled Tribe community in the Alluri Sitharama Raju district. She represents the Telugu Desam Party. She won the 2024 Andhra Pradesh Legislative Assembly election.

== Early life and education ==
Sirisha is a Koya dora tribal from Rampachodavaram. She is a former Anganwadi worker. Her husband Matham Vijaya Bhaskar is a farmer and was a former MPTC member of Rajavommangi mandal.

== Political career ==
Sirisha won the 2024 Andhra Pradesh Legislative Assembly election from Rampachodavaram Assembly Constituency representing Telugu Desam Party. She defeated Nagulapalli Dhanalakshmi of YSR Congress Party by a margin of 9,139 votes.
