= Viswasarayi Kalavathi =

Indian politician

Member of Legislative Assembly, Andhra Pradesh
- In office 2014–2024
- Preceded by: Nimmaka Sugreevulu
- Succeeded by: Nimmaka Jayakrishna
- Constituency: Palakonda

Personal details
- Born: Palakonda, Manyam, Andhra Pradesh, India
- Party: YSR Congress Party
- Occupation: Politician

Viswasarayi Kalavathi (born 1967) is an Indian politician from Andhra Pradesh. She was elected to the Andhra Pradesh Legislative Assembly twice from Palakonda as a member of the YSR Congress Party.

== Early life and education ==
Kalavathi hails from Vanduva village, Veeraghattam Mandal, Srikakulam district. Her father's name is Viswasarayi Narasimha Rao. She married Mandangi Hari Prasad. In 2002, she did her M.A. in Economics from Ravenshaw College, Cuttack. She was a deputy registrar in the Cooperative Department.

== Career ==
She entered politics after joining the Praja Rajyam Party in 2009 but lost the Assembly election from Palakonda. Later, she joined YSR Congress Party and won the 2014 election from the same seat. She retained it winning the 2019 Andhra Pradesh Legislative Assembly Election representing YSRCP from Palakonda again. She defeated Nimmaka Jayakrishna of TDP by a margin of 17,980 votes.
