= Nagulapalli Dhanalakshmi =

Indian politician (born 1984)

Nagulapalli Dhanalakshmi (born 6 December 1984) is an Indian politician from East Godavari district, Andhra Pradesh. She served as a Member of the Andhra Pradesh Legislative Assembly, representing the Rampachodavaram Assembly constituency, after winning the 2019 Assembly election.

== Early life and education ==
She was born to Nagulapalli Raghava and Veerabbayi Dora in Gondolu village, located in Addateegala mandal in the then East Godavari district. She was belongs to ST -kondadora community. She completed her Bachelor of Arts from SKR College in Rajahmundry in 2011 and later earned bachelor of education B.Ed. She was a teacher at the Girijan Welfare residential school in Errampalem. Her mother, Nagulapalli Raghava, was elected as sarpanch of Gondolu Panchayat for the third time in 2021.

== Career ==
Dhanalakshmi became a first-time MLA. Dhanalakshmi resigned from her teaching position in June 2018 to pursue a political career. She was elected to the Andhra Pradesh Legislative Assembly representing YSR Congress Party (YSRCP) in the 2019 Assembly election from Rampachodavaram constituency of East Godavari district defeating Telugu Desam Party candidate Vanthala Rajeswari by 39,206 votes.
