= Alajangi Jogarao =

Indian politician

Alajangi Jogarao (born 1973) is an Indian politician from Andhra Pradesh. He won the 2019 Andhra Pradesh Legislative Assembly election representing the YSR Congress Party from Parvathipuram Assembly constituency, which is reserved for Scheduled Caste community in Parvathipuram Manyam district. He defeated Bobbili Chiranjeevulu by a margin of 24,199 votes.

== Early life and education ==
Jogarao is from Parvathipuram, Parvathipuram Manyam district, Andhra Pradesh. He is the son of late Sathyam. He completed his MTech at Punjab University through distance education in 2003. His wife is a secondary grade teacher.

== Career ==
Jogarao joined YSR Congress Party and was given the MLA ticket for the first time in 2019 to contest from the Parvathipuram constituency and made a winning debut in the assembly. He worked for laying a road to Chakkarapalli village in Balijapet mandal and was felicitated through 'Palabhishekam' (showering of milk) by the villagers.

He won from Parvathipuram Assembly constituency representing the YSRCP in the 2019 Andhra Pradesh Legislative Assembly election. He polled 75,304 votes and defeated his nearest rival, Bobbili Chiranjeevulu of the Telugu Desam Party, by a margin of 24, 199 votes. He lost the 2024 Andhra Pradesh Legislative Assembly election to Bonela Vijaya Chandra of the TDP by a margin of 24,414 votes.
