= Kiran Kumar Reddy ministry =

Andhra Pradesh Council of Ministers headed by N. Kiran Kumar Reddy (2010–2014)

- 25th Ministry of Andhra Pradesh

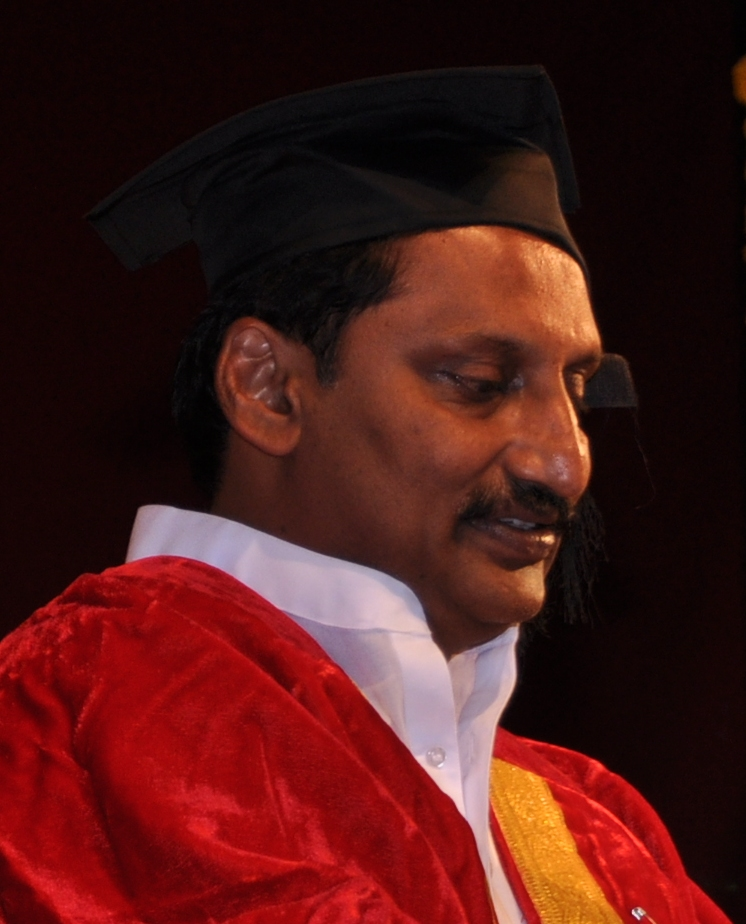
- Kiran Kumar Reddy
- Date formed: 25 November 2010
- Date dissolved: 1 March 2014

People and organisations
- Governor: E. S. L. Narasimhan
- Chief Minister: N. Kiran Kumar Reddy
- Deputy Chief Minister: Damodar Raja Narasimha
- Member parties: Indian National Congress
- Status in legislature: Majority
- Opposition party: Telugu Desam Party
- Opposition leader: N. Chandrababu Naidu (Leader of the opposition)

History
- Election: 2009
- Outgoing election: 2014
- Legislature terms: 3 years, 88 days
- Predecessor: Konijeti Rosaiah ministry
- Successor: Third N. Chandrababu Naidu ministry

The Kiran Kumar Reddy ministry (or also known as 25th ministry of Andhra Pradesh) was formed on 25 November 2010 headed by N. Kiran Kumar Reddy after the resignation of the incumbent Chief Minister Konijeti Rosaiah.

== Council of Ministers ==
The following is a list of the ministers in Andhra Pradesh.

S.No	Name	Constituency	Department	Party
1.	N. Kiran Kumar Reddy; Chief Minister	Pileru	General Administration.; Law & Order.; Energy.; Coal & Boilers.; Public Enterprises.; Home.; Jails.; Fire Services.; Sainik Welfare.; Printing & Stationery.; Other departments not allocated to any Minister.	INC
Deputy Chief Minister
2.	Damodar Raja Narasimha; Deputy Chief Minister	Andole	Higher Education.; Technical Education.	INC
Cabinet Ministers
3.	D. K. Aruna	Gadwal	Information.; Public Relations.; Cinematography.; A.P. Film.; TV & Theatre Development Corporation.	INC
4.	Anam Ramanarayana Reddy	Atmakur	Finance & Planning.; Small Savings.; State Lotteries.	INC
5.	Galla Aruna Kumari	Chandragiri	Mines.; Geology.	INC
6.	Botsa Satyanarayana	Cheepurupalli	Transport.	INC
7.	Erasu Prathap Reddy	Srisailam	Law & Courts.	INC
8.	J. Geeta Reddy	Zahirabad	Major Industries.; Sugar.; Commerce.; Export Promotion.	INC
9.	Kunduru Jana Reddy	Nagarjuna Sagar	Panchayat Raj.; Rural Water Supply.	INC
10.	Kanna Lakshminarayana	Guntur West	Agriculture.; Agriculture Technology Mission.	INC
11.	Kasu Venkata Krishna Reddy	Narasaraopet	Cooperation.	INC
12.	Pasupuleti Balaraju	Paderu	Tribal Welfare	INC
13.	Basavaraju Saraiah	Warangal East	Backward Classes Welfare.	INC
14.	Manugunta Maheedhar Reddy	Kandukur	Municipal Administration.; Urban Development.	INC
15.	Nalamada Uttam Kumar Reddy	Huzurnagar	Housing.; Weaker Section Housing Programme.; AP Cooperative Housing Societies Federation.; AP Housing Board.	INC
16.	Kolusu Parthasarathy	Penamaluru	Secondary Education.; Government Exminations.; AP Residential Educational Institutions Society.; Hyderabad Public School.; Intermediate Education.; Prohibition & Excise.	INC
17.	Pithani Satyanarayana	Achanta	Social Welfare.; Roads & Buildings.	INC
18.	Ponnala Lakshmaiah	Jangaon	Information Technology.; Communications.	INC
19.	Raghu Veera Reddy	Kalyandurg	Revenue.; Relief.; Rehabilitation.; Disaster Management.; ULC.	INC
20.	T. G. Venkatesh	Kurnool	Minor Irrigation.; APIDC.; Lift Irrigation.; WALAMTARI.; Ground Water Development.	INC
21.	Thota Narasimham	Jaggampeta	Stamps.; Registration.; DD & Fisheries.; Veterinary University.	INC
22.	Ramreddy Venkat Reddy	Palair	Horticulture; Sericulture.; RSAD.	INC
23.	Sake Sailajanath	Singanamala	Primary Education.; SSA.; Adult Education.; AP Open Schools Society.; Jawahar Bal Bhavan.; AP Mahila Samata Society.; SIET.; Public Libraries.; SCERT.; AP Text Book Press.; Legislative Affairs.	INC
24.	Vijaya Ramaraju Setrucharla	Pathapatnam	Forest.; Environment.; Science & Technology.	INC
25.	Duddilla Sridhar Babu	Manthani	Civil Supplies.; Food & Consumer Affairs.; Legal Metrology.; Commercial Taxes.	INC
26.	Danam Nagender	Khairatabad	Labour.; Employment.; Training & Factories.; Industrial Training Institutes & Boilers.	INC
27.	Dokka Manikya Vara Prasad	Tadikonda	Rural Development.; NREGS.	INC
28.	Podduturi Sudarshan Reddy	Bodhan	Major & Medium Irrigation.; A.P. Water Resources Development Corporation.	INC
29.	Vakiti Sunitha Laxma Reddy	Narsapur	Indira Kranthi Patham.; Pensions.; Self Help Groups & Women Development.; Child Welfare & Disabled Welfare.; Juvenile Welfare.	INC
30.	Ahmadullah Mohammad Syed	Kadapa	Minority Welfare.; Wakf.; Urdu Academy.	INC
31.	Vatti Vasant Kumar	Unguturu	Tourism & Culture.; Archaeology & Museums.; Archives & Youth Services & Sports.; NCC.; Language & Culture.	INC
32.	Ganta Srinivasa Rao	Anakapalle	Infrastructure.; Investments.; Sea Ports.; Airports.; Natural Gas.	INC
33.	C. Ramachandraiah	MLC	Endowments.	INC
34.	Mula Mukesh Goud	Goshamahal	Marketing.; Warehousing.	INC
35.	Kondru Murali Mohan	Rajam	Health.; Medical Education.; Drug Control Administration.; APVVP.; AP Aids Control Society; Arogyasree.; Family Welfare.; Health Insurance.; 104 & 108.; Medical Infrastructure.; Ayush.; Yogadhyayana Parishad.	INC
36.	Gaddam Prasad Kumar	Vikarabad	Handlooms & Textiles.; Spinning Mills.; Small Scale Industries.	INC

=== Former Ministers ===
The Following Ministers Has Resigned Due To Various Reasons

S.No	Name	Constituency	Department	Party
1.	Komatireddy Venkat Reddy	Nalgonda	Infrastructure.; Investment.; Sea Ports.; Airports.; Natural Gas.	INC
2.	Y. S. Vivekananda Reddy	MLC	Agriculture.; Agriculture Technology Mission.	INC
3.	D. L. Ravindra Reddy	Mydukur	Health.; Aaryoga Sree.; Health Education.; Family Welfare.; APVVP.; AP Aids Control Society.	INC
4.	P. Shankar Rao	Secunderabad Cant	Textiles.; Handlooms.; Spinning Mills.; Small Scale Industries.; Public Enterprises.	INC
5.	Jupally Krishna Rao	Kollapur	Endowments.	INC
6.	Mopidevi Venkataramana	Repalle	Excise & Prohibition.	INC
7.	Sabitha Indra Reddy	Maheshwaram	Home Affairs.; Disaster Management.; Jails.; Fire Services.; Sainik Welfare.; Printing & Stationery.	INC
8.	Dharmana Prasada Rao	Srikakulam	Roads & Buildings.	INC
9.	Pinipe Viswarup	Amalapuram	Animal Husbandry.; Fisheries.; Dairy Development.; Veterinary University.	INC
