= Second Y. S. Rajasekhara Reddy ministry =

Andhra Pradesh Council of Ministers headed by Y. S. Rajasekhara Reddy (2009–2009)

- 23rd Ministry of Andhra Pradesh

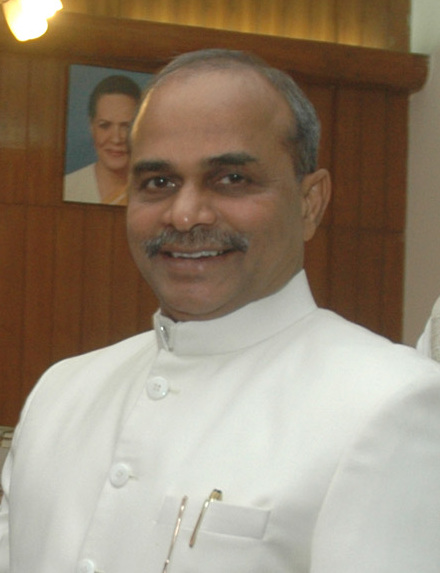
- Y. S. Rajasekhara Reddy
- Date formed: 25 May 2009
- Date dissolved: 2 Sep 2009

People and organisations
- Governor: E. S. L. Narasimhan
- Chief Minister: Y. S. Rajasekhara Reddy
- Member parties: Indian National Congress
- Status in legislature: Majority
- Opposition party: Telugu Desam Party
- Opposition leader: N. Chandrababu Naidu (Leader of the opposition)

History
- Election: 2009
- Outgoing election: 2004
- Legislature term: 5 years
- Predecessor: First Y. S. Rajasekhara Reddy ministry
- Successor: Konijeti Rosaiah ministry

The Second Y. S. Rajasekhara Reddy ministry (or also known as 23rd ministry of Andhra Pradesh) of the state of Andhra Pradesh was formed on 25 May 2009 headed by Y. S. Rajasekhara Reddy as the Chief Minister following the 2009 Andhra Pradesh Legislative Assembly election.

== Background ==
Prior to 2009 Andhra Pradesh Legislative Assembly elections a pre-poll alliance was formed by the Telugu Desam Party, Telangana Rashtra Samithi, Communist Party of India and Communist Party of India (Marxist) to contest in the elections against the sole incumbent contender Indian National Congress.

== Council of Ministers ==
Name	Constituency	Department	Party
Y. S. Rajasekhara Reddy; Chief Minister	Pulivendla	General Administration; Other departments not allocated to any Minister	INC
Cabinet Ministers
Konijeti Rosaiah	MLC	Finance; Planning & Legislative Affairs	INC
Damodar Raja Narasimha	Andole	Marketing; Warehousing	INC
D. K. Aruna	Gadwal	Minister of Small Scale industries; Sugar; Khadi and Village Industrie	INC
Anam Ramanarayana Reddy	Atmakur	Municipal Administration; Urban Development	INC
Galla Aruna Kumari	Chandragiri	Roads & Buildings	INC
Botsa Satyanarayana	Cheepurupalli	Panchayat Raj	INC
Erasu Prathap Reddy	Srisailam	Law & Courts	INC
J. Geeta Reddy	Zahirabad	Minister of Information and Public relations	INC
Konda Surekha	Parkal	Women Development & Child Welfare; Disabled & Juvenile Welfare	INC
Kanna Lakshminarayana	Guntur West	Minister of Major Industries; Food Processing; Commerce & Export Promotion	INC
Gade Venkata Reddy	Bapatla	Cooperation	INC
Pasupuleti Balaraju	Paderu	Tribal Welfare	INC
Basavaraju Saraiah	Warangal East	Backward Classes Welfare	INC
Balineni Srinivasa Reddy	Ongole	Mines & Geology; Handlooms & Textiles; Spinning Mills; Small Scale Industries	INC
Nalamada Uttam Kumar Reddy	Huzurnagar	Housing; Weaker Section Housing Programme; AP Cooperative Housing Societies Federation; AP Housing Board	INC
Kolusu Parthasarathy	Penamaluru	Animal Husbandry; Fisheries; Dairy Development	INC
Pithani Satyanarayana	Achanta	Social Welfare; Roads & Buildings	INC
Ponnala Lakshmaiah	Jangaon	Major Irrigation	INC
Raghu Veera Reddy	Kalyandurg	Agriculture	INC
Ramreddy Venkat Reddy	Palair	Horticulture; Sericulture; RSAD	INC
Sake Sailajanath	Singanamala	Primary Education; SSA; Adult Education; AP Open Schools Society; Jawahar Bal Bhavan; AP Mahila Samata Society; SIET; Public Libraries; SCERT; AP Text Book Press; Legislative Affairs	INC
Satrucharla Vijaya Rama Raju	Pathapatnam	Forest; Environment; Science & Technology	INC
Duddilla Sridhar Babu	Manthani	Higher Education	INC
Danam Nagender	Khairatabad	Health	INC
Dokka Manikya Vara Prasad	Tadikonda	Secondary Education	INC
Podduturi Sudarshan Reddy	Bodhan	Major & Medium Irrigation; A.P. Water Resources Development Corporation	INC
Vakiti Sunitha Laxma Reddy	Narsapur	Minor Irrigation	INC
Ahmadullah Mohammad Syed	Kadapa	Minority Welfare; Wakf; Urdu Academy	INC
Vatti Vasant Kumar	Unguturu	Tourism & Culture; Archaeology & Museums; Archives & Youth Services & Sports; NCC; Language & Culture	INC
Pilli Subhash Chandra Bose	Ramachandrapuram	Social Welfar	INC
Mula Mukesh Goud	Goshamahal	Marketing; Warehousing	INC
Kondru Murali Mohan	Rajam	Health; Medical Education; Drug Control Administration; APVVP; AP Aids Control Society; Arogyasree; Family Welfare; Health Insurance; 104 & 108; Medical Infrastructure; Ayush; Yogadhyayana Parishad	INC
Gaddam Prasad Kumar	Vikarabad	Handlooms & Textiles; Spinning Mills; Small Scale Industries	INC
Sabitha Indra Reddy	Maheshwaram	Home Affairs; Disaster Management; Jails; Fire Services; Sainik Welfare; Printing & Stationery	INC
Komatireddy Venkat Reddy	Nalgonda	Infrastructure; Investment; Sea Ports; Airports; Natural Gas	INC
Jupally Krishna Rao	Kollapur	Endowments	INC
Mopidevi Venkataramana	Repalle	Excise & Prohibition	INC
Dharmana Prasada Rao	Srikakulam	Roads & Buildings	INC
Pinipe Viswarup	Amalapuram	Animal Husbandry; Fisheries; Dairy Development; Veterinary University	INC

== See also ==
- Andhra Pradesh Council of Ministers
- Second N. Chandrababu Naidu ministry
- First Y. S. Rajasekhara Reddy ministry
