= Congress Working Committee =

Executive committee of the Indian National Congress (INC)

The Congress Working Committee (CWC) is the executive committee of the Indian National Congress. It was formed in December 1920 at Nagpur session of INC which was headed by C. Vijayaraghavachariar. The CWC is composed of senior party leaders and is responsible for taking decisions on important policy and organizational matters, as well as guiding and directing the party's activities and campaigns at the national level. It typically consists of fifteen members elected from the All India Congress Committee (AICC). The CWC is headed by the party president, who is elected by the members of the All India Congress Committee (AICC), the party's central governing body.

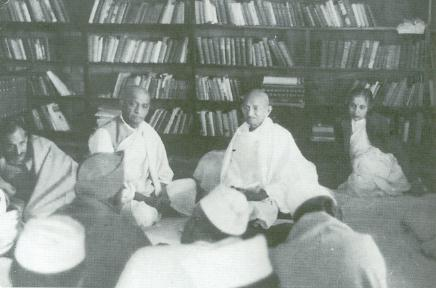
Mahatma Gandhi attends a Congress Working Committee meeting at Anand Bhavan, Allahabad; Vallabhbhai Patel to the left, Vijaya Lakshmi Pandit to the right, January 1940.

The Working Committee has had different levels of power in the party at different times. In the period prior to Indian independence in 1947, the Working Committee was the centre of power, and the Working President was frequently more active than the Congress President. In the period after 1967, when the Congress Party split for the first time (between factions loyal to Indira Gandhi and those led by the Syndicate of regional leaders including Kamaraj, Prafulla Chandra Sen, Ajoy Mukherjee, and Morarji Desai), the power of the Working Committee declined; but Indira Gandhi's triumph in 1971 led to a re-centralisation of power away from the states and the All-India Congress Committee and caused the Working Committee in Delhi to once again be the paramount decision-making body of the party. The centralised nature of Congress decision making has since caused observers in the states to informally describe instructions from Delhi as coming from the High Command.

== Composition of Congress Working Committee ==
President

Name	Portrait	Position in government
Mallikarjun Kharge		Member of Parliament; Leader of the Opposition, Rajya Sabha

Members

S. No	Member	Portrait	Position in government
1.	Sonia Gandhi		Member of Parliament; Former Congress President
2.	Rahul Gandhi		Member of Parliament; Leader of the Opposition, Lok Sabha; Former INC President
3.	A. K. Antony		Former Member of Parliament
4.	Ambika Soni		Former Member of Parliament
5.	Abhishek Singhvi		Member of Parliament
6.	Adhir Ranjan Chowdhury		Former Member of Parliament
7.	Ajay Maken		Member of Parliament
8.	Anand Sharma		Former Member of Parliament
9.	Jairam Ramesh		Member of Parliament
10.	Gaikhangam Gangmei		Former Deputy Chief Minister, Manipur
11.	Jitendra Singh		Former Member of Parliament
12.	Selja Kumari		Member of Parliament
13.	Dr Lal Thanhawla		Former Chief Minister of Mizoram
14.	Mukul Wasnik		Member of Parliament; Former Union Minister of India
15.	Charanjit Singh Channi		Member of Parliament; Former Chief Minister of Punjab
16.	Priyanka Gandhi Vadra		Member of Parliament; Congress Party General Secretary
17.	P. Chidambaram		Member of Parliament; Former Union Minister of India
18.	Randeep Surjewala		Member of Parliament
19.	N. Raghuveera Reddy		Former AP Congress President
20.	Tariq Anwar		Member of Parliament
21.	Sachin Pilot		Former Member of Parliament; Former Deputy Chief Minister of Rajasthan
22.	Tamradhwaj Sahu		Former Member of the Legislative Assembly
23.	Shashi Tharoor		Member of Parliament
24.	Salman Khurshid		Former Union Minister; Former Member of Parliament
25.	Digvijaya Singh		Member of Parliament; Former Chief Minister of Madhya Pradesh
26.	Bhupesh Baghel		Member of the Legislative Assembly; Former Chief Minister of Chhattisgarh
27.	Meira Kumar		Former Speaker of Lok Sabha
28.	Jagdish Thakor		Former Gujarat Congress President
29.	Ghulam Ahmad Mir		Former J & K Congress President
30.	Avinash Pandey		Former Member of Parliament
31.	Deepa Dasmunsi		Former Member of Parliament
32.	Gaurav Gogoi		Member of Parliament; Deputy Leader of Indian National Congress in Lok Sabha
33.	Syed Naseer Hussain		Member of Parliament
34.	Kamleshwar Patel		Member of the Legislative Assembly
35.	K. C. Venugopal		Member of Parliament
36.	Balasaheb Thorat		Former Minister, Government of Maharashtra

== Permanent Invitees ==
S.no	Member	Portrait	Position
1.	Ajay Kumar Lallu		ex MLA,Former President of UPPCC Uttar Pradesh
2.	Rajeev Shukla		MP
3.	A. Chellakumar		Ex MP Lok Sabha
4.	Pratibha Singh		Ex MP Lok Sabha
5.	Pawan Kumar Bansal		ex MP, (Chandigarh)
6.	Veerappa Moily		ex MP, (Karnataka)
7.	Harish Rawat		Former Chief Minister of Uttarakhand
8.	Rajani Patil		MP
9.	Harish Chaudhary		MLA, Rajasthan
10.	Ramesh Chennithala		MLA, Kerala
11.	B. K. Hariprasad		MLC, Karnataka
12.	Manish Tewari		MP, chandigarh
13.	Sukhjinder Singh Randhawa		MP
14.	Deepender Singh Hooda		MP, Haryana
15.	Krishna Allavaru		
16.	Girish Chodankar		
17.	Gurdeep Singh Sappal		
18.	T. Subbarami Reddy		ex MP, Andhra Pradesh
19.	K Raju		
20.	Manikrao Thakre		Ex MLA
21.	Chandrakant Handore		MP Rajya Sabha, ex MLAMaharashtra
22.	Meenakshi Natarajan		ex MP, Madhya Pradesh
23.	Manickam Tagore		MP
24.	Phulo Devi Netam		MP, Chhattisgarh
25.	Damodar Raja Narasimha		Cabinet Minister, Telangana
26.	Sudip Roy Barman		MLA, Tripura
27.	K. Sudhakaran		MP
28.	Akhilesh Prasad Singh		MP
29.	Qazi Mohd Nizamuddin		MLA, Uttarakhand
30.	Saptagiri Ulaka		MP
31.	Vijay Inder Singla		Ex MLA
32.	Kanhaiya Kumar		
33.	Sachin Rao		

== Special Invitees ==
S. No	Member	Portrait	Position
1.	Alka Lamba		President, All India Mahila Congress
2.	Vinod Jakhar		President, NSUI
3.	Uday Bhanu Chib		President, IYC
4.	Srinivas BV		Chief Organiser, Seva Dal
5.	Supriya Shrinate		Chairman, Social Media & Platforms
6.	Challa Vamshi Chand Reddy		Ex MLA
7.	Kodikunnil Suresh		MP
8.	Yashomati Thakur		Ex MLA
9.	Gidugu Rudra Raju		ex President APCC
10.	Karan Mahara		Ex President UPCC
11.	Praniti Shinde		MP
12.	M. M. Pallam Raju		ex-MP
13.	Pawan Khera		Chairman, Media & Publicity
14.	Vikar Rasool Wani		Ex President J&KPCC
15.	Naseem Khan		Ex MLA Maharashtra

== See also ==
- Indian National Congress
- All India Congress Committee
- Pradesh Congress Committee
