= Nidamarru mandal =

Nidamarru Mandal
- Mandal
- Interactive Map Outlining mandal
- Location in Andhra Pradesh, India
- Coordinates: 16°43′30″N 81°25′15″E
- Country: India
- State: Andhra Pradesh
- District: Eluru
- Headquarters: Nidamarru

Government
  - Body: Mandal Parishad

Area
  - Total: 114.91 km^{2} (44.37 sq mi)

Population (2011)
  - Total: 47,623
  - Density: 414.44/km^{2} (1,073.4/sq mi)

Languages
  - Official: Telugu
- Time zone: UTC+5:30 (IST)
- Vehicle registration: AP 37

Nidamarru Mandal is one of 28 Mandals in the Eluru district of Andhra Pradesh, India. Its headquarters is located in Nidamarru. Its bordering states are Unguturu mandal, Bhimadole mandal, Pentapadu mandal, Ganapavaram mandal, Akividu mandal and Undi mandal.

== Demographics ==
The 2011 Nidamarru mandal Census showed the population] to be 47,623 people living in 13,639 households]. There were 23,612 women and 24,011 men with a ratio of 983:1000. The census also showed that there were 4,533 children between the ages of 0–6 years old. Of the children 2,325 were boys and 2,208 were girls. With a ratio of 1000:800. The average literacy rate was 70.22% concluding that there were 30,257 literate individuals in which 15,774 of them were men and 14,483 were women.

== Work profile ==
The published report of the 2011 Census bureau gathered information about employment and occupation, 20,571 people were employed. 15,110 of them were men and 5,461 were women. The survey also showed employment statistics. There were 17,367 civilly employed, 2,558 cultivators, 12,128 working in agriculture, 244 working in housing and 2,437 miscellaneous jobs. There were also 3,204 marginal workers.

== Administration ==
Nidamarru Mandal is administrated by the Unguturu Assembly Constituency of Eluru Lok Sabha Constituency and is one of sixteen Mandals in the Eluru revenue division.

== Towns and villages ==
According to the 2011 census, the Mandal has 21 settlements, all of which are villages. Pedanindrakolanu is the largest village and Narasimhapuram is the smallest in population size.

The settlements in the Mandal are listed below:

1. Adavikolanu
2. Amudalapalle
3. Bavayapalem
4. Buvvanapalle
5. Bynepalle
6. Chanamilli
7. Chinanindrakolanu
8. Devaragopavaram
9. Enikepalle
10. Gunaparru
11. Kakaramilli
12. Krovvidi
13. Mandalaparru
14. Naganamilli
15. Narasimhapuram
16. Nidamarru
17. Pedanindrakolanu
18. Siddapuram
19. Thokalapalle
20. Venkatapuram
21. Vipparthikhandrika

== Education ==
The Nidamarru mandal plays a major role in educating the children from nearby villages. Both primary and secondary school educations are funded by government aid and private schools under the State School Education Department. As per the school information report for the academic year of 2015–16, the mandal had more than 4,862 students enrolled in over 52 schools.

== See also ==
- List of mandals in Andhra Pradesh
- Eluru district
