= B. Yamini Bala =

Indian politician (born 1966)

B. Yamini Bala (born 24 June 1966) is an Indian politician from Andhra Pradesh. She is a former Member of the Legislative Assembly in 2014 from Singanamala representing the Telugu Desam Party.

She is from Singanamala, Anantapur district. She married B. Balanna, a doctor. She is the daughter of Varikoti Jalaiah Prasad. Her mother Shamantakamani, served as an MLC. She completed her MA and later did her BEd in 2009, both from S.K University, Anantapur. Later, she completed her doctoral studies.

Bala first became an MLA from Singanamala Assembly constituency winning the 2014 Andhra Pradesh Legislative Assembly election representing the Telugu Desam Party. She polled 86,679 votes and defeated her nearest rival, Jonnalagadda Padmavathy of the YSR Congress Party, by a margin of 4584 votes. After the bifurcation oif the state, she is the first to win the Singanamala seat.
