= Puppala Srinivasa Rao =

Indian politician

Member of Legislative Assembly, Andhra Pradesh
- In office 2019–2024
- Preceded by: Ganni Veeranjaneyulu
- Succeeded by: Patsamatla Dharmaraju
- Constituency: Unguturu

Personal details
- Born: 1969 (age 56–57) Bhuvvanapalli, Nidamarru mandal, West Godavari district, Andhra Pradesh, India
- Party: YSR Congress Party
- Education: Zilla Parishad High School, Ganapavaram; Chintalapati Bapiraju Junior College, Ganapavaram (Intermediate)
- Occupation: Politician, Businessperson

Puppala Srinivasa Rao (born 1969), alias Vasubabu, is an Indian politician from Andhra Pradesh. He is a member of the Andhra Pradesh Legislative Assembly representing the YSR Congress Party from Unguturu Assembly constituency in West Godavari district. He won the 2019 Andhra Pradesh Legislative Assembly election. He is nominated by YSR Congress Party to contest the Unguturu seat in the 2024 Andhra Pradesh Legislative Assembly election.

== Early life and education ==
Srinivasa Rao was born in Bhuvvanapalli village, Nidamarru mandal, West Godavari district. His father is Hema Sundara Venkata Ramana. He did his schooling in Zilla Parishad High School in Ganapavaram and completed his intermediate, the pre-university course, at Chintalapati Bapiraju Junior College in Ganapavaram. He is a businessman. Chief Minister Jagan Mohan Reddy attended his daughter's wedding in August 2021.

== Career ==
Srinivasarao was elected in the 2019 Andhra Pradesh Legislative Assembly election representing YSR Congress Party from Unguturu Assembly constituency. He polled 94,621 votes and defeated his nearest rival, Ganni Veeranjaneyulu of Telugu Desam Party, by a margin of 33,153 votes. He reportedly faced a lot of anti-incumbency in the constituency and lost the 2021 Andhra Pradesh Legislative Assembly election to Dharmaraju Patsamatla of Janasena Party, a BJP TDP and JSP alliance candidate, by a margin of 44,945 votes.
