= Nannapuneni Narender =

Indian politician

Nannapuneni Narender (born 5 August 1972) is an Indian politician from Telangana state. He is a former member of the Telangana Legislative Assembly from Warangal East Assembly constituency in Warangal district representing the Telangana Rashtra Samithi.

== Early life and education ==
Narender was born on 5 August 1972 in Warangal, Telangana state, to Kothamma and the late Narasimhamurti. He married Mehar Vani and they have two sons, Lokesh Patel and Manpreeth Patel. He completed his intermediate in 1990 at Lal Bahadur College, Warangal. He runs his own business and declared assets worth Rs. 2 crore in 2018 and Rs.5 crore in 2023, in his affidavits to the Election Commission of India.

== Career ==
Narender entered active politics joining the Telugu Desam Party in 1995. He won the Warangal East Assembly constituency in the 2018 Telangana Legislative Assembly election representing the Telangana Rashtra Samithi. He polled 83,922 and defefated his closest rival, Ravi Chandra Vaddiraju of the Indian National Congress, by a margin of 28,782 votes. He lost the 2023 Telangana Legislative Assembly election on TRS ticket finishing third behind winner Konda Surekha of the Indian National Congress and Errabelli Pradeep Kumar Rao of the Bharatiya Janata Party.

In 2016, he was elected as the Mayor of the Greater Warangal Municipal Corporation.
