= Y. S. Rajasekhara Reddy ministry =

Y. S. Rajasekhara Reddy ministry may refer to these cabinets headed by Indian politician YS Rajasekhara Reddy as chief minister of Andhra Pradesh:

- First Y. S. Rajasekhara Reddy ministry (2004-2009)
- Second Y. S. Rajasekhara Reddy ministry (2009)
