= Giddi =

Giddi (Telugu: గిడ్డి) is a Telugu surname. Notable people with the surname include:

- Giddi Eswari, Indian politician
- Giddi Satyanarayana (born 1982), Indian politician
