= Veeranjaneyulu =

Veeranjaneyulu is a surname. People with the name include:

- Ganni Veeranjaneyulu
- Yalamanchili Veeranjaneyulu

== See also ==
- Veeranjaneyulu Viharayatra
