= Andhra Pradesh Congress Committee =

Andhra Pradesh affiliate of the Indian National Congress

- President: Y. S. Sharmila
- Headquarters: Andhra Ratna Bhawan, Vijayawada, Andhra Pradesh
- Youth wing: Andhra Pradesh Youth Congress
- Women's wing: Andhra Pradesh Mahila Congress Committee
- Ideology: Liberalism (Indian); Secularism; Civic nationalism
- Political position: Centre
- ECI status: A State Unit of Indian National Congress
- Alliance: Indian National Developmental Inclusive Alliance (I.N.D.I.A.)
- Seats in Rajya Sabha: 0 / 11
- Seats in Lok Sabha: 0 / 25
- Seats in Andhra Pradesh Legislative Council: 0 / 58
- Seats in Andhra Pradesh Legislative Assembly: 0 / 175

Election symbol

The Andhra Pradesh Congress Committee or (Andhra PCC) is the state unit of Indian National Congress for the state of Andhra Pradesh, India. It is responsible for organizing and coordinating the party's activities and campaigns within the state, as well as selecting candidates for local, state, and national elections of all the 26 districts in Andhra Pradesh. The current president of the committee is Y. S. Sharmila.

The APCC has its headquarters at Andhra Ratna Bhawan, Vijayawada, Andhra Pradesh. The APCC is responsible for Congress party units.

== Structure & Composition ==
Name	Designation	Ref
P. V. Mohan	AICC Incharge	
Y. S. Sharmila	President; Andhra Pradesh Congress Committee	
Jesudasu Seelam, Shaik Mastan Vali	Working presidents Andhra Pradesh Congress Committee	
Ramarao Lakkaraju	President; Andhra Pradesh Youth Congress	
Naga Madhu Yadav	President; Andhra Pradesh NSUI	

== List of APCC Presidents ==
S. No	Name	Constituency/District	Term
40.	Y. S. Sharmila	Jubliehills, Hyderabad	2024–Present
39.	Gidugu Rudra Raju	Amalapuram, Konaseema	2022 - 2024
38.	Sake Sailajanath	Singanamala, Anantapur	2020 - 2022
37.	Raghu Veera Reddy	Madakasira, Anantapur	2014 - 2020
36.	Botsa Satyanarayana	Cheepurupalli, Vizianagaram	2011 - 2014
(33).	Dharmapuri Srinivas	Nizamabad, Nizamabad	2008 - 2011
35.	G.Srinivasarao	Kovvuru, West Godavari	2007 - 2008
34.	K. Keshava Rao	Hyderabad, Hyderabad	2004 - 2007
33.	Dharmapuri Srinivas	Nizamabad, Nizamabad	2003 - 2004
32.	Satyanarayana Rao	Karimnagar, Karimnagar	2000- 2003
(24).	Y. S. Rajasekhara Reddy	Pulivendula, Kadapa	1998 - 2000
31.	Mallikarjun Goud	Mahbubnagar, Mahbubnagar	1996 - 1998
30.	Konijeti Rosaiah	Vemuru, Bapatla	1994 - 1996
29.	Kayruddin Ahmed	Hyderabad, Hyderabad	1994 - 1994
28.	Majji Tulasi Das	Palasa, Srikakulam	1992 - 1994
27.	V. Hanumantha Rao	Ambeerpet, Hyderabad	1990 - 1992
26.	Anantha Ramulu Mallu	Wyra, Khammam	1990 - 1990
(16).	Marri Chenna Reddy	Sanathnagar, Hyderabad	1989 - 1990
25.	N. Janardhana Reddy	Venkatagiri, Nellore	1988 - 1989
(18).	Jalagam Vengala Rao	Sathupalli, Khammam	1985 - 1987
24.	Y. S. Rajasekhara Reddy	Pulivendula, Kadapa	1983 - 1985
23.	Gaddam Venkatswamy	Chennur, Adilabad	1982 - 1983
22.	C.Das	Hyderabad, Hyderabad	1982 - 1982
21.	Kona Prabhakara Rao	Bapatla, Guntur	1981 - 1982
(18).	Jalagam Vengala Rao	Sathupalli, Khammam	1981 - 1981
20.	V.B.Raju	Hyderabad, Hyderabad	1981 - 1981
19.	M.Aziz	Hyderabad, Hyderabad	1979 - 1981
18.	Jalagam Vengala Rao	Sathupalli, Khammam	1979 - 1979
17.	Kotla Vijaya Bhaskara Reddy	Kurnool, Kurnool	1978 - 1979
16.	Marri Chenna Reddy	Sanathnagar, Hyderabad	1978 - 1978
15	Shaik Mohammad Rahmatullah	Kadapa, Kadapa	1977 - 1978
14.	Tadepalli Musalayya	Hyderabad, Hyderabad	1976 - 1977
13.	V.Venkatanarayana	Hyderabad, Hyderabad	1974 - 1976
12.	Mahmood Ismail	Hyderabad, Hyderabad	1972 - 1974
11.	P. Narsa Reddy	Nirmal, Adilabad	1971 - 1972
10.	B.V.Gurumurthy	Khairatabad, Hyderabad	1969 - 1971
9.	Kakani Venkata Ratnam	Vuyyuru, Krishna	1967 - 1969
8.	Peddireddy Thimmareddy	Kurnool, Kurnool	1964 - 1967
7.	Gottipati Brahmayya	Machilipatnam, Krishna	1962 - 1964
6.	Mullipudi Pallamraju	Kakinada, East Godavari	1961 - 1962
5.	Nookala Narotham Reddy	Manukonda, Warangal	1960 - 1960
4.	Pidatala Ranga Reddy	Giddaluru, Prakasam	1958 - 1959
3.	Alluri Satyanarayana Raju	Narasapuram, West Godavari	1954 - 1957
2.	Bezawada Gopala Reddy	Atmakuru, Nellore	1953 - 1954
1.	Neelam Sanjiva Reddy	Anantapur, Anantapur	1951 - 1953

== List of INC Presidents from Andhra Pradesh ==
S.No	Name	Designation	Location
1.	Bhogaraju Pattabhi Sitaramayya	President	Eluru, Eluru district.
2.	Neelam Sanjiva Reddy	President	Anantapur, Anantapur district.
3.	Damodaram Sanjivayya	President	Kurnool, Kurnool district.
4.	P. V. Narasimha Rao	President	Narsampeta, Warangal district.
5.	Kasu Brahmananda Reddy	President	Narsaropeta, Palnadu district.

== List of AICC Incharges ==
#	Incharge	Portrait	Origin State/UT	Term			Ref.
1.	Digvijaya Singh		Madhya Pradesh	16 June 2013	27 May 2018	4 years, 345 days	
2.	Oommen Chandy		Kerala	27 May 2018	18 July 2023	5 years, 52 days	
3.	Manickam Tagore		Tamil Nadu	24 December 2023	5 September 2026	2 years, 255 days	
4.	P. V. Mohan		Karnataka	5 September 2026	Incumbent	71 days	

== Electoral History ==
=== Assembly Elections ===
Election	Seats won	Change	Total votes	Share of votes	Swing	Status in Assembly	Leader/Chief Minister
1955 & 1957	187 / 301	N/A	5,101,473	41.72%	N/A	Government	Bezawada Gopala Reddy (1955); Neelam Sanjiva Reddy (1957)
1962	177 / 300	▼10	5,523,359	47.25%	▲5.53%	Government	Neelam Sanjiva Reddy
1967	165 / 287	▼12	6,292,649	45.42%	▼1.83%	Government	Kasu Brahmananda Reddy
1972	219 / 287	▲54	7,474,255	52.29%	▲6.87%	Government	P. V. Narasimha Rao
1978	175 / 294	▼44	7,908,220	39.25%	▼13.04%	Government	Marri Chenna Reddy
1983	60 / 294	▼115	7,090,907	33.58%	▼5.67%	Opposition (1983-84; 1984-85); External support to TDP Bhaskara Rao faction (1984)	Kotla Vijaya Bhaskara Reddy
1985	50 / 294	▼10	8,566,891	37.25%	▲3.67%	Opposition	Kotla Vijaya Bhaskara Reddy
1989	181 / 294	▲131	13,539,785	47.09%	▲9.84%	Government	Marri Chenna Reddy
1994	26 / 294	▼155	10,540,182	33.85%	▼13.24%	Opposition	Kotla Vijaya Bhaskara Reddy
1999	91 / 294	▲65	13,526,309	40.61%	▲6.76%	Opposition	Y.S. Rajasekhara Reddy
2004	185 / 294	▲94	13,793,461	38.56%	▼2.05%	Government	Y. S. Rajasekhara Reddy
2009	156 / 294	▼29	15,374,448	36.55%	▼2.01%	Government	Y. S. Rajasekhara Reddy
2014	0 / 175	▼156	802,452	2.80%	▼33.75%	lost	Raghu Veera Reddy
2019	0 / 175	Steady	368,909	1.17%	▼1.63%	lost	Raghu Veera Reddy
2024	0 / 175	Steady	580,613	1.72%	▲0.55%	lost	Y. S. Sharmila

- In 1957, elections were conducted in the newly added region of Telangana alone which includes 105 seats and then in 1962 elections were held for the state as a whole in all 300 seats.
- In 1978 Indira Gandhi led INC (I) won 175 seats while INC(O) won 30 seats with 17.01%.
Andhra Pradesh Congress Legislative Assembly seat count

=== Lok Sabha elections ===
Total number of Lok Sabha seats in Andhra Pradesh is 42 and after division seats come down to 25 out of which Congress has none.

Election	Seats won	Change	Total votes	Share of votes	Swing	Status in Lok Sabha	National Leader
1957	37 / 43	N/A	4,906,044	51.47%	N/A	Government	Jawaharlal Nehru
1962	34 / 43	▼3	5,711,263	47.96%	▼3.51%	Government	Jawaharlal Nehru
1967	35 / 41	▲1	6,354,959	46.82%	▼1.14%	Government	Indira Gandhi
1971	28 / 41	▼7	7,286,069	55.73%	▲8.91%	Government	Indira Gandhi
1977	41 / 42	▲13	9,582,708	57.36%	▲1.63%	Opposition (1977-79); External support to JP(S) Gov't (1979-80)	Indira Gandhi
1980	41 / 42	Steady	9,508,388	56.24%	▼1.12%	Government	Indira Gandhi
1984	6 / 42	▼35	9,452,394	41.81%	▼14.43%	Government	Rajiv Gandhi
1989	39 / 42	▲33	14,671,782	51.01%	▲9.20%	Opposition (1989-90); External support to SJP(R) Gov't (1990-91)	Rajiv Gandhi
1991	25 / 42	▼14	11,610,772	45.55%	▼5.46%	Government	Rajiv Gandhi (t.1991) assassinated P. V. Narasimha Rao (s.1991)
1996	22 / 42	▼3	12,087,596	39.66%	▼5.89%	Opposition (1996); External support to JD Gov't (1996–1998)	P. V. Narasimha Rao
1998	22 / 42	Steady	12,269,475	38.46%	▼1.20%	Opposition	Sitaram Kesri
1999	5 / 42	▼17	14,278,099	42.79%	▲4.33%	Opposition	Sonia Gandhi
2004	29 / 42	▲24	14,861,984	41.56%	▼1.23%	Government	Sonia Gandhi
2009	33 / 42	▲3	16,377,941	38.95%	▼2.61%	Government	Sonia Gandhi (Party Leader); Manmohan Singh (Prime Minister)
2014	0 / 42	▼33	822538	2.90%	▼36.05%	Opposition	Sonia Gandhi (Party Leader); Rahul Gandhi (PM Candidate)
2019	0 / 25	Steady	406,977	1.31%	▼1.59%	Opposition	Rahul Gandhi
2024	0 / 25	Steady	8,86,165	2.66%	▲1.35%	Opposition	Mallikarjun Kharge (Party Leader); Rahul Gandhi

X

Andhra Pradesh Congress Lok Sabha seat count

== See also ==
- All India Congress Committee
- All India Mahila Congress
- Indian Youth Congress
- National Students Union of India
