= Gidugu Rudra Raju =

Indian politician (born 1953)

23rd President of the Andhra Pradesh Congress Committee
- In office 23 November 2022 – 15 January 2024
- AICC President: Mallikarjun Kharge
- Preceded by: Sake Sailajanath
- Succeeded by: Y. S. Sharmila

Personal details
- Born: 18 January 1969 (age 57) Amalapuram, Andhra Pradesh, India
- Party: Indian National Congress
- Education: Osmania University

Gidugu Rudra Raju (born 18 January 1969) is an Indian politician who served as the president of Andhra Pradesh Congress Committee (APCC) and formerly served as an MLC in the Andhra Pradesh Legislative Council. He also served as All India Congress Committee Secretary incharge of Odisha.

== Early life ==
Rudraraju is a native of Amalapuram in East Godavari district.

== Career ==
Rudraraju started his career in politics at a young age, being an active student union leader of the National Students' Union of India (NSUI), student wing of the Indian National Congress. He then went on to hold key posts in the Andhra Pradesh Youth Congress. When Y. S. Rajasekhara Reddy (YSR) was the APCC president, he was a campaign committee member. During the chief ministership of YSR, he served as the chairman of the Andhra Pradesh Medical Infrastructure Corporation. He also formerly served as an MLC in the undivided Andhra Pradesh Legislative Council.

He has been described as a hardcore loyalist to his party and YSR.

Gidugu Rudra Raju was appointed as Andhra Pradesh Congress president (APCC) president on 23 November 2022 and he resigned from the post on 15 January 2024. Gidugu Rudra Raju was appointed as special invitee to the Congress Working Committee on 16 January 2024.
