= Cherukuvada Sri Ranganadha Raju =

Indian politician

Member of Legislative Assembly Andhra Pradesh
- In office 2019–2024
- Preceded by: Satyanarayana Pithani
- Succeeded by: Satyanarayana Pithani
- Constituency: Achanta
- In office 2004–2009
- Preceded by: Dandu Sivarama Raju
- Constituency: Attili

Personal details
- Party: YSR Congress Party
- Occupation: Politician

Cherukuvada Sri Ranganadha Raju is the Ex-Minister of Housing in Y. S. Jagan Mohan Reddy's government of Andhra Pradesh, India. He was elected to the Andhra Pradesh Legislative Assembly from Achanta constituency in the 2019 assembly election.
