= Bandaru Sravani Sree =

Indian politician (born 1990)

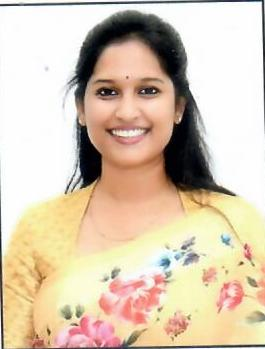
- Official portrait, 2024

Member of Legislative Assembly, Andhra Pradesh
- Incumbent
- Assumed office 4 June 2024
- Preceded by: Jonnalagadda Padmavathy
- Constituency: Singanamala

Personal details
- Born: 3 August 1990 (age 36) Ananthapur district, Andhra Pradesh, India
- Party: Telugu Desam Party
- Occupation: Politician

Bandaru Sravani Sree (born 3 August 1990) is an Indian politician from Andhra Pradesh. She has been a member of the Andhra Pradesh Legislative Assembly representing the Singanamala Assembly constituency since 2024. She is a member of the Telugu Desam Party.

== Early life and education ==
Sravani Sree was born on 3 August 1990 in Anantapur district of Andhra Pradesh. She completed her Master's in Mass Communication from St. Francis College for Women, Hyderabad.

== Political career ==
Sravani Sree started her political career in 2019 and made her electoral debut contesting from the Singanamala Assembly constituency as a Telugu Desam Party (TDP) candidate in the 2019 Andhra Pradesh Legislative Assembly election. She was defeated by YSR Congress Party (YSRCP) candidate Jonnalagadda Padmavathy by a margin of 46,242 votes. In 2024, she was elected as Member of the Legislative Assembly from the same constituency, defeating YSRCP candidate M. Veeranjaneyulu by a margin of 8,788 votes.

== Electoral history ==
Election results
Year	Office	Constituency	Party	Votes	%	Opponent	Party	Votes	%	Result	Ref
2019	MLA	Singanamala	Telugu Desam Party	71,802	36.36	Jonnalagadda Padmavathy	YSR Congress Party	118,044	59.78	Lost	
2024	MLA	Singanamala	Telugu Desam Party	102,957	49.44	Mannepakula Veeranjaneyulu	YSR Congress Party	94,169	45.22	Won	
