= Kambala Jogulu =

Indian politician

Member of Legislative Assembly, Andhra Pradesh
- In office 2014–2024
- Preceded by: Andhra Pradesh Assembly created
- Succeeded by: Kondru Murali Mohan
- Constituency: Rajam

Personal details
- Party: YSR Congress Party

Kambala Jogulu (born 1968) is an Indian politician from Andhra Pradesh. He won the 2019 Andhra Pradesh Legislative Assembly election on YSRCP ticket from Rajam Assembly constituency in Srikakulam district.

== Early life and education ==
Jogulu hails from a farming family in Saradhi village, Rajam mandal, Srikakulam district, and his father Gavarayya is a farmer. He completed his schooling in Municipal High School, Srikakulam in 1984 before becoming a graduate in arts at Government Arts College, Srikakulam in 1991. Then he did law at the All Saints Christian Law College, Visakhapatnam.

== Career ==
He was first elected as an MLA in 2004 on a TDP ticket from Palakonda constituency. In 2009, he shifted to PRP but lost the Assembly election from Rajam INC candidate Kondru Murali Mohan. In 2014, he won the Rajam seat on YSRCP ticket and retained it in 2019 elections. In 2019, he defeated Kondru Murali Mohan by a margin of 16,848 votes. YSRCP shifted him from Rajam to Payakaraopeta SC reserved seat for the 2024 elections. Tale Rajesh is nominated to contest from Rajam. But he lost the 2024 Andhra Pradesh Legislative Assembly election to Vangalapudi Anitha of the Telugu Desam Party by a margin of 43,72 votes.
