= Matsyarasa Visweswara Raju =

Indian politician

Member of the Andhra Pradesh Legislative Assembly
- Incumbent
- Assumed office 2024
- Preceded by: Kottagulli Bhagya Lakshmi
- Constituency: Paderu

Personal details
- Party: YSR Congress Party

Matsyarasa Visweswararaju is an Indian politician from Andhra Pradesh. He is belongs to Bagata He is a member of YSR Congress Party. He has been elected as the Member of the Legislative Assembly representing the Paderu Assembly constituency in 2024 Andhra Pradesh Legislative Assembly elections.
