= Ganni Veeranjaneyulu =

Indian politician

Ganni Veeranjaneyulu (born 1962) is an Indian politician from Andhra Pradesh. He was a former member of the Andhra Pradesh Legislative Assembly from Unguturu Assembly constituency in West Godavari district representing the Telugu Desam Party.

== Early life ==
Veeranjaneyulu is from Unguturu, West Godavari district, Andhra Pradesh. He is the son of the late Satyanarayana. He completed his B.Com. in 1981 at Sir CR Reddy College, Eluru which is affiliated with Andhra University. Later, he did BL, at Sir CR Reddy Law College, Eluru in 1985. He is a farmer and declared assets worth Rs.16 crore in his affidavit to the Election Commission of India.

== Career ==
Veeranjaneyulu won from Unguturu Assembly constituency in the 2014 Andhra Pradesh Legislative Assembly election representing the Telugu Desam Party. He polled 82,118 votes and defeated his nearest rival, Puppala Srinivasa Rao of the YSR Congress Party, by a margin of 8,930 votes.

In May 2025, he was named as the chairman of the Andhra Pradesh State Cooperative Bank, a post with a cabinet rank.
