= Patsamatla Dharmaraju =

Indian politician

Member of the Andhra Pradesh Legislative Assembly
- Incumbent
- Assumed office 2024
- Preceded by: Puppala Srinivasa Rao
- Constituency: Unguturu

Personal details
- Party: Jana Sena Party

Patsamatla Dharmaraju is an Indian politician from Andhra Pradesh. He is a member of Jana Sena Party.

== Political career ==
Dharmaraju was elected as the Member of the Legislative Assembly representing the Unguturu Assembly constituency in the 2024 Andhra Pradesh Legislative Assembly elections. He won the elections by a margin of 44945 votes defeating Puppala Srinivasa Rao Vasubabu of YSR Congress Party.

== Electoral performance ==
2024 Andhra Pradesh Legislative Assembly election: Unguturu
Party	Candidate	Votes	%	±%
JSP	Patsamatla Dharmaraju	108,894	59.63	
YSRCP	Puppala Srinivasa Rao Vasubabu	63949	35.02	
INC	Pathapati Hari Kumara Raju	3130	1.71	
NOTA	None Of The Above	6650	1.15	
Majority		44945	24.61	
Turnout		182623		
JSP gain from YSRCP		Swing		
