= Kottagulli Bhagya Lakshmi =

Indian politician (born 1984)

Member of Legislative Assembly, Andhra Pradesh
- In office 2019–2024
- Preceded by: Giddi Eswari
- Succeeded by: Matsyarasa Visweswara Raju
- Constituency: Paderu

Personal details
- Party: YSR Congress Party

Kottagulli Bhagya Lakshmi (born 1984) is an Indian politician from Visakhapatnam district, Andhra Pradesh. She is a member of the Andhra Pradesh Legislative Assembly from Paderu Assembly constituency, which is reserved for Scheduled Tribe community in Visakhapatnam district. She is from Bagata community. She represented the YSR Congress Party and won the 2019 Andhra Pradesh Legislative Assembly election.

== Early life and education ==
Lakshmi was born in Paderu, Visakhapatnam district, Andhra Pradesh, India. Her father Kottagulli Chittinaidu is a farmer turned politician who worked as member of the Andhra Pradesh Legislative Assembly in 1985. She completed her MSc in 2006 at Andhra University, Visakhapatnam. She married Narasinga Rao. Together they have a son, Vivek Vardhan, and a daughter, Jasmitha Sree. She declared assets of Rs. 56 lakhs in her affidavit to the Election Commission of India and states that she has no criminal cases registered against her.

== Political career ==
Lakshmi was elected to the Andhra Pradesh Legislative Assembly representing YSR Congress Party in the 2019 Andhra Pradesh Legislative Assembly election from Paderu constituency of Visakhapatnam district. She is one among the 12 woman MLAs elected to the AP Legislative assembly in 2019. In 2019, she polled 71,153 votes for a vote share of 50.60 per cent, and defeated her nearest rival, Giddi Eswari of the Telugu Desam Party, by a margin of 42,804 votes. She was denied a ticket in the 2024 Andhra Pradesh Legislative Assembly election as YSR Congress Party nominated Matsyarasa Visweswara Raju, who won the seat by 19,338 votes.
