= Konda Surekha =

Indian politician (born 1965)

Minister of Endowments, Environment & Forests Government of Telangana
- In office 7 December 2023 – 3 September 2026
- Governor: Tamilisai Soundararajan (2023-2024); C.P. Radhakrishnan (Additional charge) (2024); Jishnu Dev Varma (2024-2026); Shiv Pratap Shukla ( 2026–present)
- Chief Minister: Revanth Reddy
- Preceded by: Allola Indrakaran Reddy

Member of Legislative Assembly, Telangana
- Incumbent
- Assumed office 7 December 2023
- Preceded by: Nannapuneni Narender
- Constituency: Warangal East
- In office 2 June 2014 – 11 December 2018
- Preceded by: Basavaraju Saraiah
- Succeeded by: Nannapuneni Narender
- Constituency: Warangal East

Minister of Women Development, Child Welfare, Disabled and Juvenile Government of Andhra Pradesh
- In office 25 May 2009 – 2 September 2009
- Governor: N. D. Tiwari
- Chief Minister: Y. S. Rajasekhara Reddy
- Preceded by: Nedurumalli Rajyalakshmi
- Succeeded by: Vakiti Sunitha Laxma Reddy

Member of Legislative Assembly Andhra Pradesh
- In office 2009–2012
- Preceded by: Bandari Shara Rani
- Succeeded by: M. Bikshpathi
- Constituency: Parakala
- In office 1999–2009
- Preceded by: Sirikonda Madhu Sudanachary
- Succeeded by: Constituency Abolished
- Constituency: Shyampeta

Personal details
- Born: 19 August 1965 (age 61) Warangal
- Party: Indian National Congress (until- 2011)(2018-present)
- Other political affiliations: YSR Congress Party (2011-2013); Bharat Rashtra Samithi (2013-2018)
- Spouse: Konda Murali
- Children: 1

Konda Surekha (born 19 August 1965) is an Indian politician currently serving as the Member of Legislative assembly representing Warangal East assembly constituency in the Telangana Legislative assembly. She previously served as the Minister for Forest and Environment, and Endowments in the Government of Telangana in the Revanth Reddy Ministry and also served in the Second Y. S. Rajasekhara Reddy ministry. She previously represented Shyampeta and Parakala constituencies in the Telangana legislative assembly. She is a member of the Indian National Congress party.

== Early life ==
Konda Surekha was born in the city of Warangal, India to Thumma Chandramouli and Thumma Radha and married to Konda Murali.

== Career ==
Konda Surekha was elected as Mandal Parishad, in 1995. In 1996 she was appointed PCC member and in 1999 was elected as M.L.A. from Shayampet. In 1999 she became a Congress Legislature Party Treasurer, as well as being a member of Women & Child Welfare Committee, Health and Primary Education Standing committee. She was appointed AICC Member in 2000.

In 2004 she got elected as MLA –Shayampet and in 2004 was an official spokesperson for Congress party. She became Ex Officio Member, Municipal corporation, in 2005. In 2009 she got elected as Parkal MLA and was sworn in as Minister for Women Development & Child Welfare, Disabled & Juvenile Welfare.

She served as Minister for Women Development & Child Welfare, Disabled & Juvenile Welfare under Y. S. Rajasekhara Reddy, but resigned after YSR's death when his son Y. S. Jaganmohan Reddy was not made Chief Minister, even though he has majority of MLAs support.

She resigned on 4 July 2011, her MLA seat for Jagan cause and later for YSR's name mentioned in FIR. She contested by-polls held on 12 June 2012 from Parkal assembly constituency as YSR Congress Party candidate.

She resigned from YSRC party in July 2013 citing ill-treatment from the Jagan Mohan Reddy Party people. Days before Indian general elections 2014 she joined Telangana Rashtra Samithi party and contested from Warangal-East Assembly constituency. She won as an MLA from Warangal East (Assembly constituency) with a 55,085 votes majority.

In 2018 she quit TRS party along with her husband and joined the INC.

On 7 December 2023, she took oath as the cabinet minister in Telangana and later she were assigned Environment and Forests, and Endowment portfolios on 9 december 2024 in Revanth Reddy Ministry.

== Political statistics ==
=== Andhra Pradesh / Telangana Legislative Assembly ===
Year	Constituency	Party	Votes	%	Opponent	Opponent Party	Opponent Votes	%	Result	Margin	%
2023	Warangal East	INC	67,757	39.47	Errabelli Pradeep Kumar Rao	BJP	52,105	30.35	Won	15,652	9.12
2018	Parkal	INC	59,384	33.44	Challa Dharma Reddy	TRS	105,903	59.64	Lost	-46,519	-26.2
2014	Warangal East	TRS	88,641	59.82	Basavaraju Saraiah	INC	33,556	22.65	Won	55,085	37.17
2012	Parkal (by-election)	YSRCP	50,374	–	Bikshapathy Moluguri	TRS	51,936	–	Lost	-1,562	–
2009	Parkal	INC	69,135	46.79	Bikshapathy Moluguri	TRS	56,335	38.13	Won	12,800	8.66
2004	Shyampet	INC	72,454	63.92	Premendar Reddy Gujjula	BJP	28,430	24.83	Won	44,024	39.09
1999	Shyampet	INC	43,384	44.43	Devu Sambaiah	BJP	42,813	43.85	Won	571	0.58

== Personal life ==
Konda Surekha is married to Konda Murali, an ex-MLC and a Congress leader from Warangal district. They have one daughter.
