= Jonnalagadda Padmavathy =

Indian politician

Member of Legislative Assembly, Andhra Pradesh
- In office 2019–2024
- Preceded by: B. Yaminibala
- Succeeded by: Bandaru Sravani Sree
- Constituency: Singanamala

Personal details
- Party: YSR Congress Party

Jonnalagadda Padmavathy is an Indian politician from the state of Andhra Pradesh. She is elected as the Member of the Legislative Assembly in the 2019 Andhra Pradesh Legislative Assembly election from Singanamala.

== Early life and education ==
Padmavathy was born to J. Chennakesavulu and J. Nirmala Devi in 1979 in Nellore, Andhra Pradesh. She completed her M.Tech. from JNTU College of Engineering, Anantapur.

== Political career ==
Padmavathi joined the YSR Congress Party in 2014 and contested the 2014 Andhra Pradesh Legislative Assembly election from Singanamala constituency and lost to her closest rival Telugu Desam Party candidate B. Yaminibala by a margin of 4,584 votes. Padmavathi contested the 2019 assembly elections again from the Singanamala constituency and won as the MLA for the first time by winning with a majority of 46,242 votes over her closest rival Telugu Desam Party candidate Bandaru Sravani Sree.

== Achievements ==
Padmavathi achieved a special recognition for an atmospheric moveable cabin designed by her in the innovation competition organized by the National Research and Development Corporation for making an innovation that protects the lives of the doctors who are serving the people during the COVID-19 pandemic.
