= Giddi Eswari =

Indian politician

Member of Legislative Assembly Andhra Pradesh
- In office 2014–2019
- Preceded by: Pasupuleti Balaraju
- Succeeded by: Kottagulli Bhagya Lakshmi
- Constituency: Paderu

Personal details
- Party: Telugu Desam Party
- Other political affiliations: YSR Congress Party
- Occupation: Politics, Social Service
- Profession: Teacher

Giddi Eswari is an Indian politician and a member of the Andhra Pradesh Legislative Assembly from Paderu. Initially she was a teacher. She is the daughter of Appala Naidu, Ex. Member of Assembly she was Bagata community.

Eswari was a member of the YSR Congress Party before joining Telugu Desam Party on 27 November 2017. She contested from Paderu constituency as MLA with TDP ticket in 2019 and lost in the election to Bhagyalakshmi Kothagulli over a margin of 50,000 votes.
