= Gottipati Brahmayya =

Indian politician

Gottipati Brahmayya (3 December 1889 – 1984) was a freedom fighter, popularly known as Ryotu Pedda (Leader of Farmers). He was awarded the Padma Bhushan in 1982.

== Early life ==
Brahmayya was born in 1889 in a Kamma family in Ghantasala (Divi Taluka of Krishna district) in Andhra Pradesh, India; he was educated at Noble High School, Machilipatnam, he organized the library movement and the adult education movement in 1917. He was also the President of District Congress Committee during 1922–1923. He was the founder of the Khadi Consumers' and Producers' Society at Ghantasala and became President of Krishna Khadi Board during 1923–1929.

== Freedom fighter ==
Brahmayya was one of the pioneers of the Zamindari Ryot Movement. He participated in the boycott of the Simon Commission in 1927. He was sentenced to imprisonment for one year and six months in 1930 for participating in the black flag demonstration against the then Governor’s visit to Machilipatnam. He was imprisoned in Rajahmundry, Berhampore and Vellore jails. He again took part in the civil disobedience movement and was sentenced to two years of imprisonment in Rajahmundry, Bellary, Madras and Cuddalore jails. He was responsible for the temple entry of dalits at Ghantasala in 1933. He was General Secretary of Andhra Provincial Congress Committee during 1937–1940. He was again detained for participating in the Quit India movement in 1942 and placed in Vellore and Thanjavur prisons.

== Politician in independent India ==
After independence, Brahmayya became President of Andhra Pradesh Congress Committee in 1962. He served as Chairman of Andhra Pradesh Legislative Council from 1964 to 1968. He was conferred with a doctorate "Kalaprapoorna" by Andhra University. Brahmayya 's autobiography Naa Jeevana Nauka was published in the Telugu daily newspaper Andhra Jyothi in the late 1970s.
