= Pithani Satyanarayana =

Indian politician

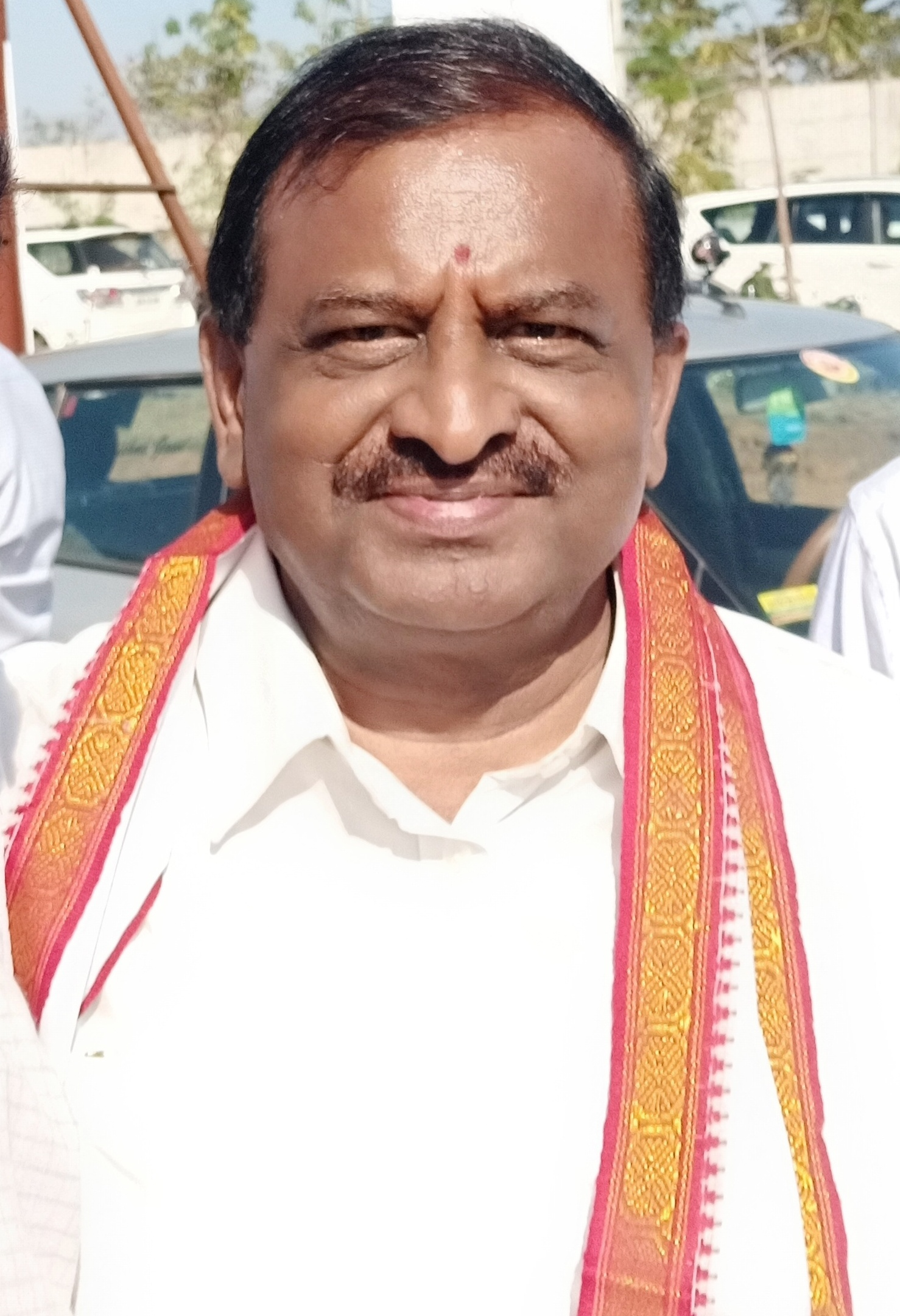

Member of Legislative Assembly, Andhra Pradesh
- Incumbent
- Assumed office 4 June 2024
- Preceded by: Cherukuvada Sri Ranganadha Raju
- Constituency: Achanta
- In office 2009–2019
- Preceded by: Peethala Sujatha
- Succeeded by: Cherukuvada Sri Ranganadha Raju
- Constituency: Achanta

Personal details
- Party: Telugu Desam Party
- Occupation: Politician

Pithani Satyanarayana is an Indian politician from Andhra Pradesh. He is a member of Telugu Desam Party. He has been elected as the Member of the Legislative Assembly representing the Achanta Assembly constituency in 2024 Andhra Pradesh Legislative Assembly elections.

== Political career ==
Pithani was elected as the MLA for the Achanta Assembly constituency, representing the Indian National Congress in the 2009 Andhra Pradesh Legislative Assembly elections. He served as a minister for social welfare, roads and buildings in the Kiran Kumar Reddy cabinet.

He joined the Telugu Desam Party in 2014 and was appointed the minister for labour and employment in N. Chandrababu Naidu cabinet. In the 2024 Andhra Pradesh Legislative Assembly elections, he was re-elected as the MLA for the Achanta constituency.

== Election results ==
=== 2009 ===
2009 Andhra Pradesh Legislative Assembly election: Achanta
Party	Candidate	Votes	%	±%
INC	Satyanarayana Pithani	54,903	46.24	+2.33
TDP	Karri Radha Krishna Reddy	39,148	32.97	−16.07
PRP	Kudupudi Srinivasa Rao	16,770	14.12	
Majority		15,755	13.27	
Turnout		118,745	83.40	+8.42
INC gain from TDP		Swing		

=== 2014 ===
2014 Andhra Pradesh Legislative Assembly election: Achanta
Party	Candidate	Votes	%	±%
TDP	Satyanarayana Pithani	63,549	48.66	
YSRCP	Mudnuri Prasad Raju	59,629	45.66	
Majority		3,920	3.00	
Turnout		130,599	81.82	−1.58
TDP gain from INC		Swing		

=== 2019 ===
2019 Andhra Pradesh Legislative Assembly election: Achanta
Party	Candidate	Votes	%	±%
YSRCP	Cherukuvada Sri Ranganadha Raju	66,494	47.92	
TDP	Satyanarayana Pithani	53,608	38.64	
JSP	Javvadhi Venkata Vijayaram	13,993	10.09	
Majority		12,886	9.29	
Turnout		138,747	79.63	−2.19
YSRCP gain from TDP		Swing		

=== 2024 ===
2024 Andhra Pradesh Legislative Assembly election: Achanta
Party	Candidate	Votes	%	±%
TDP	Satyanarayana Pithani	85,402	56.73	
YSRCP	Cherukuvada Sri Ranganadha Raju	58,848	39.09	
INC	Nekkanti Venkata Satyanarayana	1,872	1.24	
NOTA	None Of The Above	1,673	1.11	
Majority		26,554		
Turnout		1,50,541		
TDP gain from YSRCP		Swing		
