= Raghu Veera Reddy =

Indian politician

N. Raghuveera Reddy( Yadav)
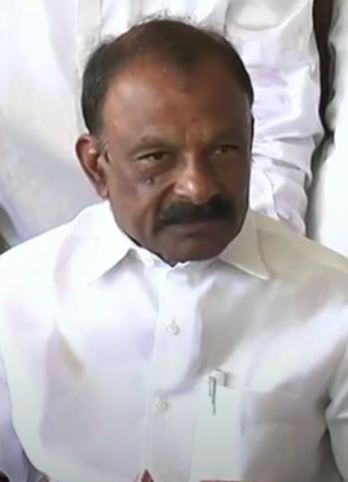
- Reddy in 2016

21st President of the Andhra Pradesh Congress Committee
- In office 11 March 2014 – 16 January 2020
- AICC President: Sonia Gandhi; Rahul Gandhi; Sonia Gandhi (Interim)
- Preceded by: Botsa Satyanarayana (united)
- Succeeded by: Sake Sailajanath

Minister of Revenue, Relief, Rehabilitation, Disaster Management and ULC Government of Andhra Pradesh
- In office 25 November 2010 – 21 February 2014
- Governor: E. S. L. Narasimhan
- Chief Minister: Kiran Kumar Reddy
- Preceded by: Chief Minister of Andhra Pradesh
- Succeeded by: Office Dissolved

Minister of Agriculture Government of Andhra Pradesh
- In office 25 May 2009 – 24 November 2010
- Governor: N. D. Tiwari; E. S. L. Narasimhan
- Chief Minister: Y. S. Rajasekhara Reddy; Konijeti Rosaiah
- Preceded by: Himself
- Succeeded by: Kanna Lakshminarayana

Minister of Agriculture, Horticulture, Sericulture, RSAD and Agriculture Technology Mission Government of Andhra Pradesh
- In office 14 May 2004 – 20 May 2009
- Governor: Surjit Singh Barnala; Sushilkumar Shinde; Rameshwar Thakur; N. D. Tiwari
- Chief Minister: Y. S. Rajasekhara Reddy
- Preceded by: Vadde Sobhanadreeswara Rao
- Succeeded by: Ramreddy Venkat Reddy

Member of Andhra Pradesh Legislative Assembly
- In office 16 May 2009 – 16 May 2014
- Preceded by: B C Govindappa
- Succeeded by: Hanumantaraya Chowdary
- Constituency: Kalyandurg
- In office 6 October 1999 – 16 May 2009
- Preceded by: Y. T. Prabhakara Reddy
- Succeeded by: K. Sudhakar
- Constituency: Madakasira
- In office 29 November 1989 – 11 December 1994
- Preceded by: H. B. Narase Gowd
- Succeeded by: Y. T. Prabhakara Reddy
- Constituency: Madakasira

Personal details
- Born: Raghuveera Reddy; 12 February 1957 (age 69) Anantapur, Andhra Pradesh, India
- Party: Indian National Congress
- Children: 2

Neelakantapuram Raghuveera Reddy (born 12 February 1957) is an Indian politician belonging to the Indian National Congress. He was appointed President for bifurcated Andhra Pradesh Congress Committee in March, 2014.

== Early life ==
Raghuveera Reddy was born on 12 February 1957 in Anantapur district to N. Kaveerappa in a Telugu-speaking Yadav family, who have the surnames of Reddy. He did his B.Sc. and Bachelors in Law from SK University. Kannada film director Prashanth Neel is his first cousin.

== Career ==
Raghuveera Reddy Yadav, is a three times M.L.A. from Madakasira Assembly Constituency. He has been changed to Kalyandurg Constituency during 2009 elections after the reorganisation of constituencies. Raghuveera Reddy contested and won from Kalyandurg Assembly Constituency in 2009 elections.

He served as a Minister for Agriculture in Y. S. Rajasekhara Reddy’s cabinet and continued with the same in Konijeti Rosaiah’s government as well. In Nallari Kiran Kumar Reddy's government he had crucial portfolio of Revenue Minister in the reorganisation of cabinet.

=== President, APCC ===
He was elected as the Congress Committee President for the residual Andhra Pradesh (post bifurcation into Andhra Pradesh and Telangana) on 11 March 2014.

== Personal life ==
Reddy is married to Sunitha and has a daughter and a son.

== Positions held ==
- President for Students Union, S.K. University, Anantapur
- Chairman, Neelakantapuram Group of Temples
- Chairman, Kallur Subbarao Trust
- Minister for Agriculture, Government of Andhra Pradesh in 2004, 2009 cabinets.
- Minister for Revenue Minister, Government of Andhra Pradesh in the recent reformation of cabinet
- APPCC President 2014-2019
