= Nidamarru =

Coordinates: 16°43′30″N 81°25′15″E

- village
- Interactive map of Nidamarru
- Country: India
- State: Andhra Pradesh
- District: Eluru

Languages
  - Official: Telugu
- Time zone: UTC+5:30 (IST)
- Vehicle registration: AP

Nidamarru is a village in Eluru district of the Indian state of Andhra Pradesh.

== Demographics ==
As of 2011 Census of India, Nidamarru had a population of 4082. The total population constitute, 2071 males and 2011 females with a sex ratio of 971 females per 1000 males. 401 children are in the age group of 0–6 years, with sex ratio of 966. The average literacy rate stands at 72.10%.
