= Pasupuleti Balaraju =

Indian politician

Minister of Tribal Welfare Government of Andhra Pradesh
- In office 25 May 2009 – 1 March 2014
- Governor: N. D. Tiwari; E. S. L. Narasimhan
- Chief Minister: Y. S. Rajasekhara Reddy; Konijeti Rosaiah; Kiran Kumar Reddy
- Preceded by: K S Redya Naik
- Succeeded by: President's Rule

Member of Legislative Assembly Andhra Pradesh
- In office 2009–2014
- Preceded by: Lake Rajarao
- Succeeded by: Giddi Eswari
- Constituency: Paderu

Pasupuleti Balaraju' (born 12 June 1964) is an Indian politician and a legislator from Andhra Pradesh, India. He belongs to YSRCP Party and he worked in Indian National Congress party. He is a former minister for Tribal welfare in the Government of Andhra Pradesh.

== Early life ==
Pasupuleti Balaraju was born in Gudem Kotha Veedhi mandal in Visakhapatnam district of Andhra Pradesh. He earned a master's degree in Arts from Annamalai University. Before entering into politics he worked as Conductor, Teacher & Coffee board president. He entered into politics at the age of 25 as mandal president.

== Political career ==
Pasupuleti Balaraju was elected to the Andhra Pradesh legislative assembly from the Chintapalle constituency in 1989 and from Paderu constituency in 2009 in Visakhapatnam district of Andhra Pradesh on Indian National Congress party ticket. He became a minister in the cabinets of Y. S. Rajasekhara Reddy and N. Kiran Kumar Reddy holding Tribal Welfare portfolio. He served as the Minister for rural and interior development and Tribal Welfare in the government of Andhra Pradesh during 2009–2014.
