= Sake Sailajanath =

Politician from Andhra Pradesh, India

22nd President of the Andhra Pradesh Congress Committee
- In office 16 January 2020 – 23 November 2022
- AICC President: Sonia Gandhi; Mallikarjun Kharge
- Preceded by: Raghu Veera Reddy
- Succeeded by: Gidugu Rudra Raju

Minister of Primary Education, AP Text Books and Legislative Affairs Government of Andhra Pradesh
- In office 25 May 2009 - 21 February 2014
- Governor: N. D. Tiwari; E. S. L. Narasimhan
- Chief Minister: Y. S. Rajasekhara Reddy; Konijeti Rosaiah; Kiran Kumar Reddy
- Preceded by: Damodar Raja Narasimha
- Succeeded by: President's Rule

Member of Legislative Assembly Andhra Pradesh
- In office 2004 - 2014
- Preceded by: Kothapalli Jayram
- Succeeded by: B. Yamini Bala
- Constituency: Singanamala

Personal details
- Born: 28 March 1964 (age 61); Dharmavaram, Andhra Pradesh, India
- Political party: YSR Congress Party

Sake Sailajanath is an Indian politician from Andhra Pradesh, India and Andhra Pradesh Congress Committee president. He was a former minister of Andhra Pradesh.
