= Ahmadullah Mohammad Syed =

Indian politician (born 1955)

Ahmadullah Mohammad Syed (born 1955) is an Indian politician from Andhra Pradesh. He is a former two time member of the Andhra Pradesh Legislative Assembly from the Kadapa Assembly constituency representing the Indian National Congress Party in 2004 and 2009.

== Early life ==
Syed is from Kadapa, Andhra Pradesh. He is the son of Mhammad Rahamathulla. He passed Class 10 at S.S.C Municipal High School, Kadapa in 1966. He declared assets worth Rs.2 crore in 2009 in his affidavit to the Election Commission of India.

== Career ==
Syed won the Kadapa Assembly constituency in the 2004 Andhra Pradesh Legislative Assembly election representing the Indian National Congress. He polled 75,615 votes and defeated his nearest rival, Kandula Sivananda Reddy of the Telugu Desam Party, by a margin of 20,656 votes. He polled 61,613 votes and retained the seat for the Congress winning the 2009 Andhra Pradesh Legislative Assembly election defeating Sivananda Reddy again by 7,350 votes.
