= Kondru Murali Mohan =

Indian politician

Member of Legislative Assembly Andhra Pradesh
- Incumbent
- Assumed office 2024
- Preceded by: Kambala Jogulu
- Constituency: Rajam

Member of Legislative Assembly United Andhra Pradesh
- In office 2009–2014
- Preceded by: constituency established
- Succeeded by: Kambala Jogulu
- Constituency: Rajam
- In office 2004–2009
- Preceded by: K. Pratibha Bharati
- Succeeded by: Meesala Neelakantam Naidu
- Constituency: Etcherla

Personal details
- Party: Telugu Desam Party (2019-present) Indian National Congress (1999-2014)

Kondru Murali Mohan is an Indian politician from Andhra Pradesh, and a member of the Telugu Desam Party. He has been elected as the Member of the Legislative Assembly, representing the Rajam Assembly constituency in 2024 Andhra Pradesh Legislative Assembly elections.
