= Vatti Vasant Kumar =

Indian politician (1955–2023)

Member of the Andhra Pradesh Legislative Assembly
- In office 2004–2014
- Succeeded by: Ganni Veeranjaneyulu
- Constituency: Unguturu Assembly constituency

Personal details
- Born: 1955 Pulla, Andhra State, India
- Died: 29 January 2023 (aged 68) Visakhapatnam, Andhra Pradesh, India
- Party: Indian National Congress
- Education: Andhra University

Vatti Vasant Kumar (1955 – 29 January 2023) was an Indian politician. A former member of the Congress Party, he served in the Andhra Pradesh Legislative Assembly from 2004 to 2014.

Vasant Kumar died in Visakhapatnam on 29 January 2023, at the age of 67.
