= Warangal East Assembly constituency =

Constituency of the Telangana legislative assembly in India

Coordinates: 17.971°N 79.640°E

Warangal East
- Constituency No. 106 for the Telangana Legislative Assembly
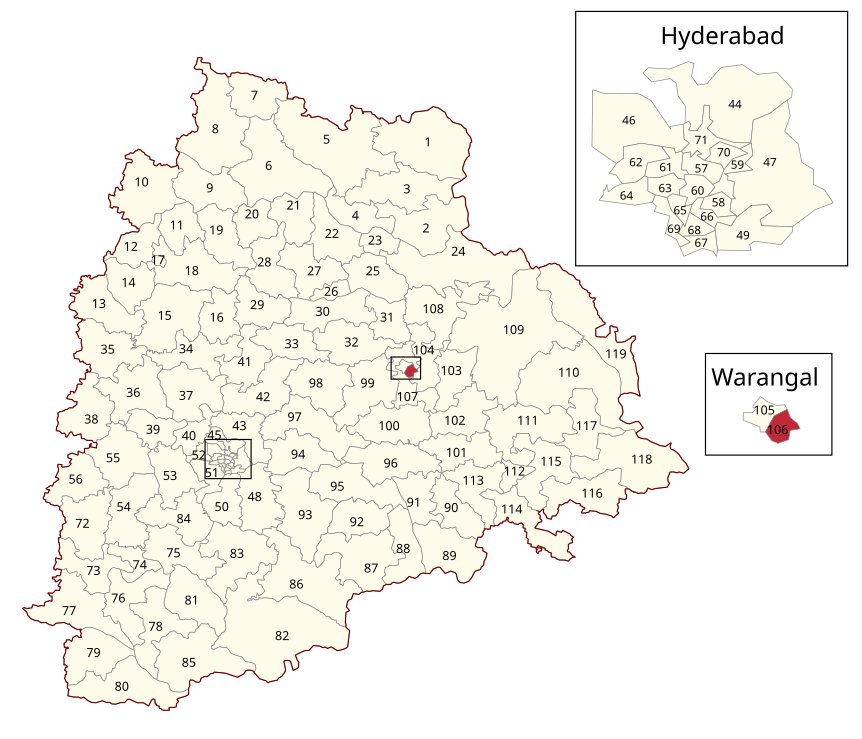
- Location of Warangal East Assembly constituency within Telangana

Constituency details
- Country: India
- Region: South India
- State: Telangana
- District: Warangal
- Lok Sabha constituency: Warangal
- Established: 2008
- Total electors: 1,98,928
- Reservation: None

Member of Legislative Assembly
- 3rd Telangana Legislative Assembly
- Incumbent Konda Surekha
- Party: Indian National Congress
- Elected year: 2023

Warangal East Assembly constituency is a constituency of Telangana Legislative Assembly, India formed after the 2008 delimitation of the earlier Hanamkonda Assembly constituency. It is one of 12 constituencies in Warangal district. It is one of the two constituencies in the City of Warangal and part of Warangal Lok Sabha constituency.

Konda Surekha of Indian National Congress is currently representing the constituency.

== Wards ==
The Assembly Constituency presently comprises the following Wards: 8 to 14, 16 to 20 and 22.

== Members of the Legislative Assembly ==
Election	Member	Party
United Andhra Pradesh
2009	Basavaraju Saraiah	Indian National Congress
Telangana Legislative Assembly
2014	Konda Surekha	Telangana Rashtra Samithi
2018	Nannapuneni Narender	Telangana Rashtra Samithi
2023	Konda Surekha	Indian National Congress

== Election results ==
=== Telangana Legislative Assembly election, 2023 ===
Telangana Assembly Elections, 2023: Warangal East
Party	Candidate	Votes	%	±%
INC	Konda Surekha	67,757	39.47	
BJP	Errabelli Pradeep Kumar Rao	52,105	30.35	
BRS	Nannapuneni Narender	42,783	24.92	
NOTA	None of the Above	1,978	1.15	
Majority		15,652	9.12	
Turnout		1,71,687		
INC gain from BRS		Swing		

=== Telangana Legislative Assembly election, 2018 ===
2018 Telangana Legislative Assembly election: Warangal East
Party	Candidate	Votes	%	±%
TRS	Nannapuneni Narender	83,922	53.94	
INC	Vaddiraju Ravichandra	55,140	35.44	
BJP	Satish Kusuma	4,729	3.04	
Independent	Akula Venkateshwarlu	2,759	1.77	
NOTA	None of the Above	2,716	1.75	
Majority		28,782	18.50	
Turnout		1,55,777	73.45	
TRS hold		Swing		

=== Telangana Legislative Assembly election, 2014 ===
2014 Telangana Legislative Assembly election: Warangal East
Party	Candidate	Votes	%	±%
TRS	Konda Surekha	88,641	59.82	
INC	Basavaraju Saraiah	33,556	22.65	
BJP	Padma Rao	11,639	7.85	
Majority		55,085		
Turnout		1,48,180	74.49	
TRS gain from INC		Swing		

=== Andhra Pradesh Legislative Assembly election, 2009 ===
2009 Andhra Pradesh Legislative Assembly election: Warangal East
Party	Candidate	Votes	%	±%
INC	Basavaraju Saraiah	41,952	32.66%	
PRP	Errabelli Pradeep Kumar Rao	34,697	27.01%	
TRS	Acha Vidya Sagar	31,477	24.50%	
Majority		7,255		
INC gain from PRP		Swing	{{{swing}}}	

== See also ==
- Warangal West Assembly constituency
- List of constituencies of Telangana Legislative Assembly
