= Singanamala Assembly constituency =

Constituency of the Andhra Pradesh Legislative Assembly, India

Coordinates: 14.80°N 77.72°E

Singanamala
- Constituency No. 152 for the Andhra Pradesh Legislative Assembly
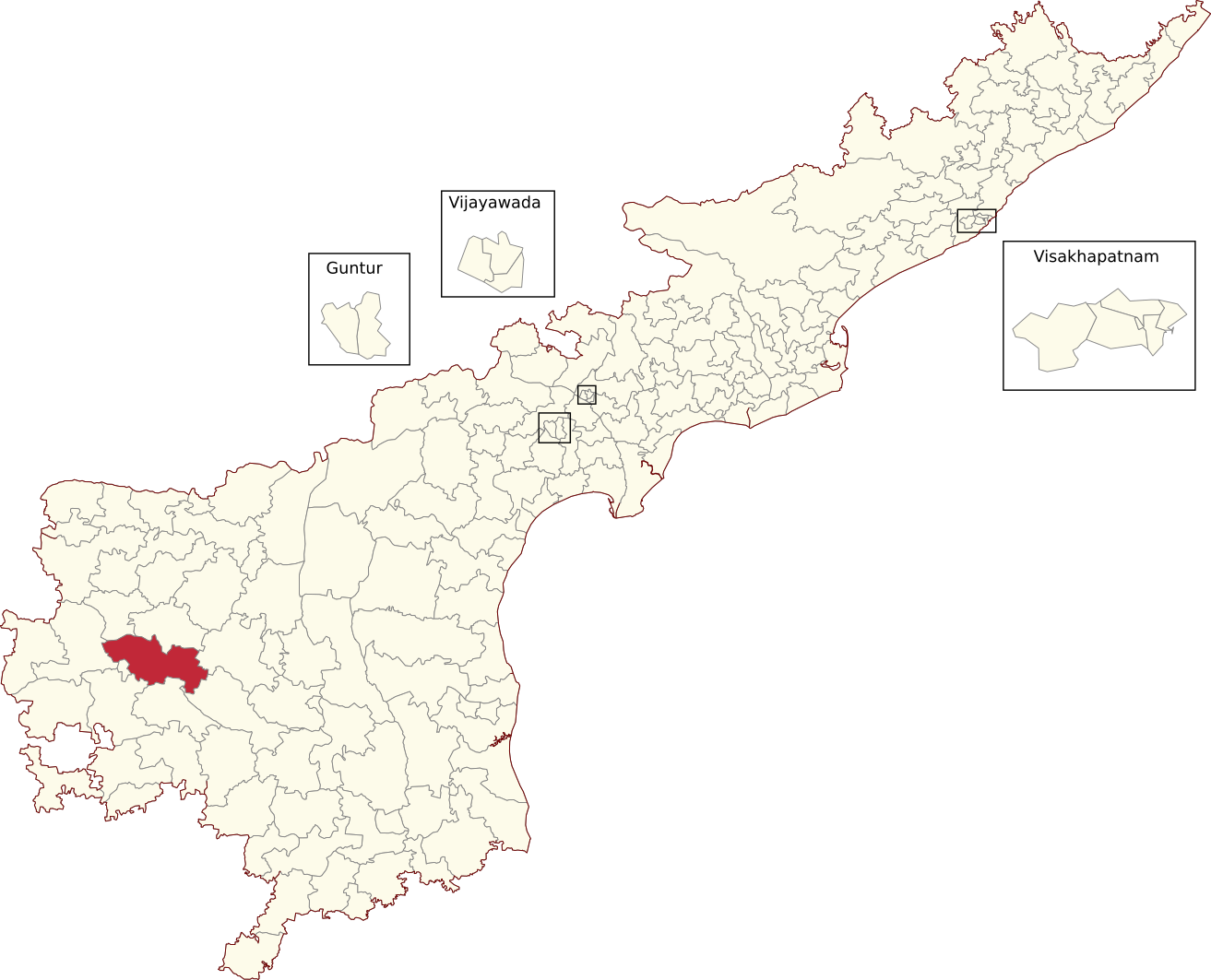
- Location of Singanamala Assembly constituency within Andhra Pradesh

Constituency details
- Country: India
- Region: South India
- State: Andhra Pradesh
- District: Anantapur
- Lok Sabha constituency: Anantapur
- Established: 1967
- Total electors: 235,064
- Reservation: SC

Member of Legislative Assembly
- 16th Andhra Pradesh Legislative Assembly
- Incumbent Bandaru Sravani Sree
- Party: TDP
- Alliance: NDA
- Elected year: 2024

Singanamala is a Scheduled Caste reserved constituency in Anantapur district of Andhra Pradesh that elects representatives to the Andhra Pradesh Legislative Assembly in India. It is one of the seven assembly segments of Anantapur Lok Sabha constituency.

Bandaru Sravani Sree is the current MLA of the constituency, having won the 2024 Andhra Pradesh Legislative Assembly election from Telugu Desam Party. As of 2019, there are a total of 235,064 electors in the constituency. The constituency was established in 1967, as per the Delimitation Orders (1967).

== Mandals ==
Mandal
Garladinne
Singanamala
Putlur
Yellanur
Narpala
B.K. Samudram

== Members of the Legislative Assembly ==
| Year | Member | Political party |
|---|---|---|
| 1967 | C. S. Kothuru | Indian National Congress |
| 1972 | Tarimela Ranga Reddy | Independent |
| 1978 | B. Rukmani Devi | Janata Party |
| 1983 | P. Gurumurthy | Telugu Desam Party |
| 1985 | Kothapalli Jayaram | Telugu Desam Party |
| 1989 | P Samanthakamani | Indian National Congress |
| 1994 | Kothapalli Jayaram | Telugu Desam Party |
| 1999 | Kothapalli Jayaram | Telugu Desam Party |
| 2004 | Sake Sailajanath | Indian National Congress |
| 2009 | Sake Sailajanath | Indian National Congress |
| 2014 | B. Yamini Bala | Telugu Desam Party |
| 2019 | Jonnalagadda Padmavathy | YSR Congress Party |
| 2024 | Bandaru Sravani Sree | Telugu Desam Party |

== Election results ==
=== 2024 ===
2024 Andhra Pradesh Legislative Assembly election: Singanamala
| Party | Candidate | Votes | % | ±% |
|---|---|---|---|---|
| TDP | Bandaru Sravani Sree | 102,957 | 49.44 | |
| YSRCP | Mannepakula Veeranjaneyulu | 94,169 | 45.22 | |
| INC | Sake Sailajanath | 3,469 | 1.67 | |
| NOTA | None Of The Above | 1,906 | 0.92 | |
| Majority | | 8,788 | 4.22 | |
| Turnout | | 2,08,233 | | |
| TDP gain from YSRCP | | Swing | | |

=== 2019 ===
2019 Andhra Pradesh Legislative Assembly election: Singanamala
| Party | Candidate | Votes | % | ±% |
|---|---|---|---|---|
| YSRCP | Jonnalagadda Padmavathy | 118,044 | 59.78% | |
| TDP | Bandaru Sravani Sree | 71,802 | 36.36% | |
| Majority | | 46,242 | 23.42% | |
| Turnout | | 1,97,366 | 83.96% | +0.082 |
| YSRCP gain from TDP | | Swing | | |

=== 2014 ===
2014 Andhra Pradesh Legislative Assembly election: Singanamala
| Party | Candidate | Votes | % | ±% |
|---|---|---|---|---|
| TDP | B. Yamini Bala | 86,679 | 48.94 | |
| YSRCP | Jonnalagadda Padmavathy | 82,095 | 46.35 | |
| Majority | | 4,584 | 2.59 | |
| Turnout | | 177,123 | 83.88 | +8.28 |
| TDP gain from ysrcp | | Swing | | |

=== 2009 ===
2009 Andhra Pradesh Legislative Assembly election: Singanamala
| Party | Candidate | Votes | % | ±% |
|---|---|---|---|---|
| INC | Sake Sailajanath | 65,367 | 43.73 | −7.38 |
| TDP | Pamidi Shamanthakamani | 62,191 | 41.61 | −2.19 |
| PRP | Kothapalli Jayaram | 12,689 | 8.49 | |
| Majority | | 3,176 | 2.12 | |
| Turnout | | 149,475 | 75.60 | +2.44 |
| INC hold | | Swing | | |

=== 2004 ===
2004 Andhra Pradesh Legislative Assembly election: Singanamala
| Party | Candidate | Votes | % | ±% |
|---|---|---|---|---|
| INC | Sake Sailajanath | 60,029 | 51.11 | +5.25 |
| TDP | Pamidi Samanthaka Mani | 51,443 | 43.80 | −6.63 |
| Majority | | 8,586 | 7.31 | |
| Turnout | | 117,456 | 73.16 | +12.65 |
| INC gain from TDP | | Swing | | |

== See also ==
- List of constituencies of Andhra Pradesh Legislative Assembly
