= Basavaraju Saraiah =

Indian politician

Minister of Backward Classes Welfare of Andhra Pradesh
- In office 2009–2014
- Constituency: Warangal East

Member of the Telangana Legislative Council
- Incumbent
- Assumed office 14 November 2020

Member of the Andhra Pradesh Legislative Assembly
- In office 1999–2014
- Succeeded by: Konda Surekha

Personal details
- Born: 5 December 1955 (age 70) Warangal
- Party: Indian National Congress (until February 2016 & July 2024 to now)
- Other political affiliations: Bharat Rashtra Samithi (2016-2024)

Basavaraju Saraiah is an Indian politician from Telangana. He served as Minister for backward castes welfare in the Kiran Kumar Reddy led AP State Cabinet and MLA of Warangal East with Congress party. He joined Bharat Rastra Samithi on 23 February 2016.

He was appointed as Telangana Pradesh Congress Committee (TPCC) Vice President on 9 June 2025.
