= Rajam Assembly constituency =

Constituency of the Andhra Pradesh Legislative Assembly, India

Coordinates: 18.45°N 83.66°E

Rajam
- Constituency No. 9 for the Andhra Pradesh Legislative Assembly
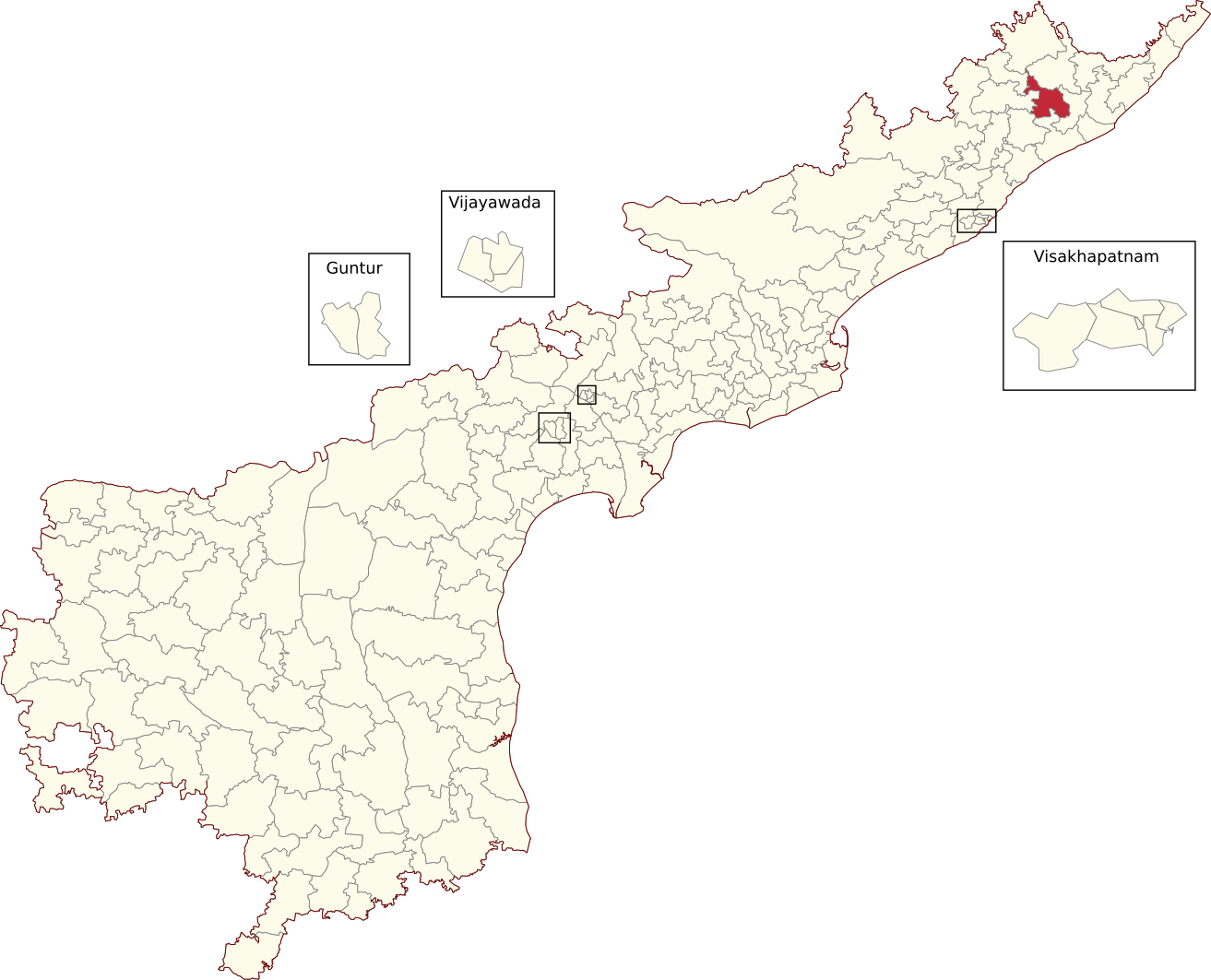
- Location of Rajam Assembly constituency within Andhra Pradesh

Constituency details
- Country: India
- Region: South India
- State: Andhra Pradesh
- District: Vizianagaram
- Lok Sabha constituency: Vizianagaram
- Established: 2008
- Total electors: 219,313
- Reservation: SC

Member of Legislative Assembly
- 16th Andhra Pradesh Legislative Assembly
- Incumbent Kondru Murali Mohan
- Party: TDP
- Alliance: NDA
- Elected year: 2024

Rajam is a Scheduled Caste reserved constituency in Vizianagaram district of Andhra Pradesh that elects represtatives to the Andhra Pradesh Legislative Assembly in India. It is one of the seven assembly segments of Vizianagaram Lok Sabha constituency.

Kondru Murali Mohan is the current MLA of the constituency, having won the 2024 Andhra Pradesh Legislative Assembly election from Telugu Desam Party. As of 2019, there are a total of 219,313 electors in the constituency. The constituency was established in 2008, as per the Delimitation Orders (2008).

== Mandals ==
The four mandals that form the assembly constituency are:

Mandal
Rajam
Vangara
Santhakaviti
Regidi Amadalavalasa

Mandals in Rajam Assembly Constituency

== Members of the Legislative Assembly ==
| Year | Member | Political party |
|---|---|---|
| 2009 | Kondru Murali Mohan | Indian National Congress |
| 2014 | Kambala Jogulu | YSR Congress Party |
| 2019 | Kambala Jogulu | YSR Congress Party |
| 2024 | Kondru Murali Mohan | Telugu Desam Party |

== Election results ==
=== 2024 ===
2024 Andhra Pradesh Legislative Assembly election: Rajam
| Party | Candidate | Votes | % | ±% |
|---|---|---|---|---|
| TDP | Kondru Murali Mohan | 94,385 | 41.33 | ▲ |
| YSRCP | Dr. Tale Rajesh | 73,663 | 32.25 | ▼ |
| INC | Kambala Rajavardhana | 3,684 | 1.61 | −− |
| | Remaining | 2,226 | 0.97 | ▼ |
| NOTA | None of the above | 2,536 | 1.11 | ▼ |
| Turnout | | 1,76,494 | 77.27 | ▲ |
| Registered electors | | 2,28,390 | | ▲ |
| Majority | | 20,722 | 11.74 | |
| TDP gain from YSRCP | | Swing | | |

=== 2019 ===
2019 Andhra Pradesh Legislative Assembly election: Rajam
| Party | Candidate | Votes | % | ±% |
|---|---|---|---|---|
| YSRCP | Kambala Jogulu | 83,561 | 37.98 | ▼ |
| TDP | Kondru Murali Mohan | 66,713 | 30.32 | ▲ |
| JSP | Mutcha Srinivasa Rao | 4,987 | 2.27 | New |
| | Remaining | 3,686 | 1.68 | ▼ |
| NOTA | None of the above | 3,587 | 1.63 | ▲ |
| Turnout | | 1,62,534 | 73.88 | ▲ |
| Registered electors | | 2,20,006 | | ▲ |
| Majority | | 16,848 | 7.66 | |
| YSRCP hold | | Swing | | |

=== 2014 ===
2014 Andhra Pradesh Legislative Assembly election: Rajam
| Party | Candidate | Votes | % | ±% |
|---|---|---|---|---|
| YSRCP | Kambala Jogulu | 69,192 | 34.71 | New |
| TDP | Kavali Prathibha Bharathi | 68,680 | 34.45 | |
| INC | Kondru Murali Mohan | 4,790 | 2.40 | |
| | Remaining | 4,531 | 2.27 | |
| NOTA | None of the above | 694 | 0.35 | |
| Turnout | | 1,47,887 | 74.18 | |
| Registered electors | | 1,99,349 | | |
| Majority | | 512 | 0.26 | |
| YSRCP gain from INC | | Swing | | |

=== 2009 ===
2009 Andhra Pradesh Legislative Assembly election: Rajam
| Party | Candidate | Votes | % | ±% |
|---|---|---|---|---|
| INC | Kondru Murali Mohan | 61,771 | 46.0 | |
| TDP | Kavali Pratibha Bharathi | 34,638 | 25.8 | |
| PRP | Kambala Jogulu | 27,923 | 20.8 | |
| BJP | Paka Rajarao | 4,234 | 3.2 | |
| Independent | Bosi Manmadharao | 1,741 | 1.3 | |
| LSP | Adinarayana Dukka | 1,645 | 1.2 | |
| BSP | Bhupathi Apparao | 1,271 | 1.0 | |
| Majority | | 27,133 | 0.3 | |
| Turnout | | 133,223 | 74.2 | ▲1.5 |
| INC gain from TDP | | Swing | | |
