= Paderu Assembly constituency =

Constituency of the Andhra Pradesh Legislative Assembly, India

Coordinates: 18.08°N 82.66°E

Paderu
- Constituency No. 29 for the Andhra Pradesh Legislative Assembly
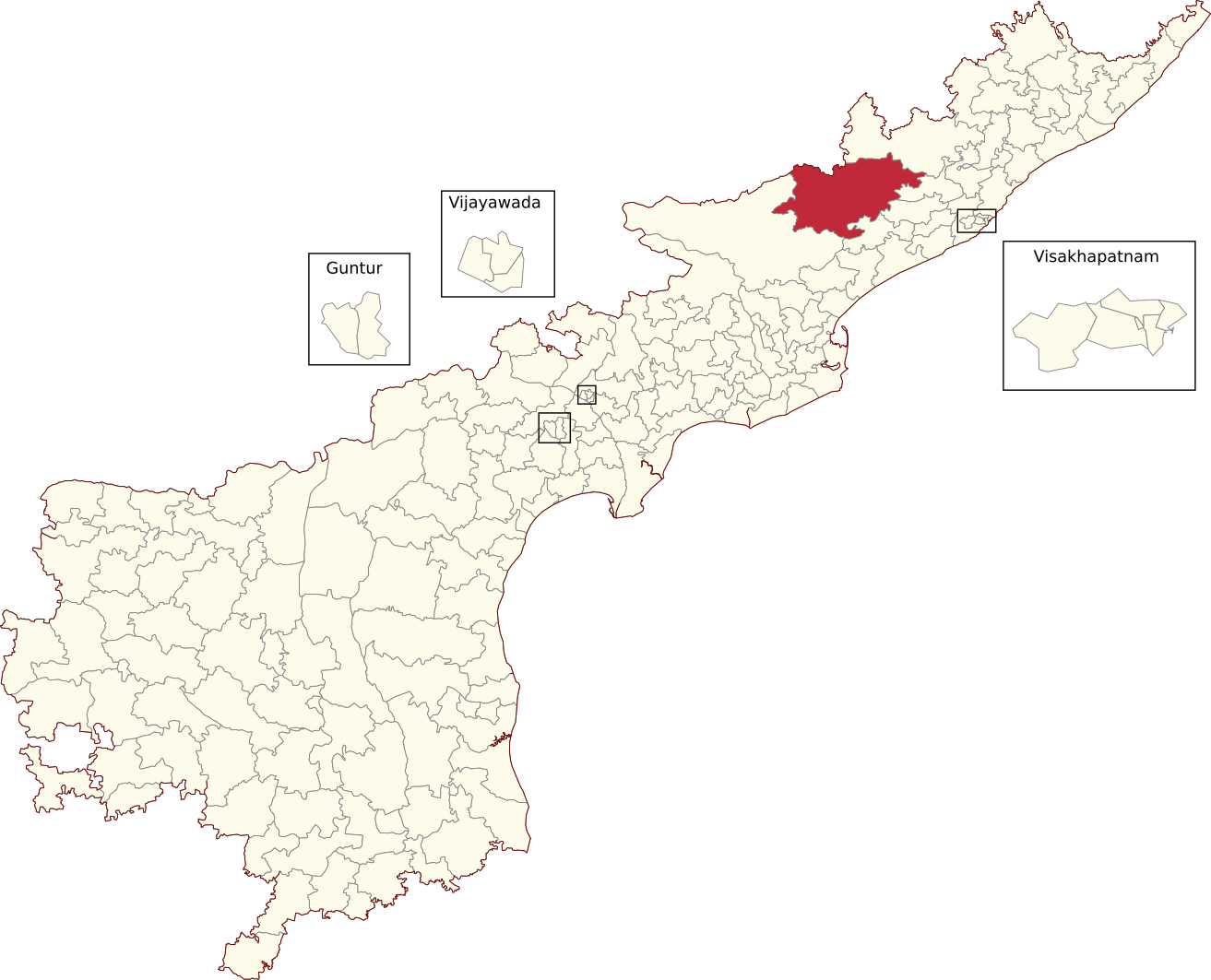
- Location of Paderu Assembly constituency within Andhra Pradesh

Constituency details
- Country: India
- Region: South India
- State: Andhra Pradesh
- District: Alluri Sitharama Raju
- Lok Sabha constituency: Araku
- Established: 1967
- Total electors: 227,042
- Reservation: ST

Member of Legislative Assembly
- 16th Andhra Pradesh Legislative Assembly
- Incumbent Matsyarasa Visweswara Raju
- Party: YSRCP
- Elected year: 2024

Paderu is a Scheduled Tribe reserved constituency in Alluri Sitharama Raju district of Andhra Pradesh that elects representatives to the Andhra Pradesh Legislative Assembly in India. It is one of the seven assembly segments of Araku Lok Sabha constituency.

Matsyarasa Visweswara Raju is the current MLA of the constituency, having won the 2024 Andhra Pradesh Legislative Assembly election from YSR Congress Party. As of 2019, there are a total of 227,042 electors in the constituency. The constituency was established in 1967, as per the Delimitation Orders (1967).

== Mandals ==
The five mandals that form the assembly constituency are:

Mandal
Paderu
G.Madugula
Chintapalli
Gudem Kotha Veedhi
Koyyuru

Mandals in Paderu Assembly Constituency

== Members of the Legislative Assembly ==
Year	Member	Political party
1967	Tammarbha Chitti Naidu	Indian National Congress
1972	Tammarbha Chitti Naidu	Indian National Congress
1978	Giddi Appala Naidu	Janata Party
1983	Tammarbha Chitti Naidu	Indian National Congress
1985	Kottagulli Chitti Naidu	Telugu Desam Party
1989	Matyarasa Balaraju	Indian National Congress
1994	Kottagulli Chitti Naidu	Telugu Desam Party
1999	Matyarasa Mani kumari	Telugu Desam Party
2004	Lake Rajarao	Bahujan Samaj Party
2009	Pasupuleti Balaraju	Indian National Congress
2014	Giddi Eswari	YSR Congress Party
2019	Kottagulli Bhagya Lakshmi	YSR Congress Party
2024	Matsyarasa Visweswara Raju	YSR Congress Party

== Election results ==
=== 2024 ===
2024 Andhra Pradesh Legislative Assembly election: Paderu
Party	Candidate	Votes	%	±%
YSRCP	Matsyarasa Visweswara Raju	68,170	42.29	▼33.21
TDP	Giddi Eswari	48,832	30.30	▲4.80
Independent	Vanthala Subba Rao	15,935	9.88	New
INC	Bulli Babu Sataka	13,566	8.41	New
NOTA	None of the above	1,420	0.88	New
Majority		19,338	12.00	▲37.00
Turnout		1,61,160	64.86	▲2.94
YSRCP hold		Swing		

=== 2019 ===
2019 Andhra Pradesh Legislative Assembly election: Paderu
Party	Candidate	Votes	%	±%
YSRCP	Kottagulli Bhagya Lakshmi	71,153	74.50	▲33.53
TDP	Giddi Eswari	28,349	25.50	New
Majority		42,804	49.00	
Turnout		140653	61.92	
YSRCP hold		Swing		

=== 2014 ===
2014 Andhra Pradesh Legislative Assembly election: Paderu
Party	Candidate	Votes	%	±%
YSRCP	Giddi Eswari	52,384	40.97	New
CPI	Demudu Goddeti	26,243	20.53	▼11.34
INC	Pasupuleti Balaraju	21,086	16.49	▼15.91
BJP	Lokula Gandhi	17,029	13.32	New
Majority		26,141	20.44	▲19.91
Turnout		127,849	59.80	▲3.36
YSRCP gain from INC		Swing		

=== 2009 ===
2009 Andhra Pradesh Legislative Assembly election: Paderu
Party	Candidate	Votes	%	±%
INC	Pasupuleti Balaraju	35,653	32.40	
CPI	Demudu Goddeti	35,066	31.87	
PRP	Krishnaveni Tamarbha	16,894	15.35	
Majority		587	0.53	
Turnout		110,297	56.44	−3.85
INC gain from BSP		Swing		

=== 2004 ===
2004 Andhra Pradesh Legislative Assembly election: Paderu
Party	Candidate	Votes	%	±%
BSP	Rajarao Lake	33,890	31.43	
Independent	Ravi Sankar Samida	26,335	24.43	
TDP	Manikumari Matyarasa	23,523	21.82	
INC	Balaraju Matsyarasa	20.052	18.60	
Majority		7,555	7.00	
Turnout		107,803	60.29	−1.24
BSP gain from TDP		Swing		

=== 1999 ===
1999 Andhra Pradesh Legislative Assembly election: Paderu
Party	Candidate	Votes	%	±%
TDP	Matyarasa Manikumari	26,160	28.3	▼8.2
BSP	Lake Rajarao	21,734	23.5	▲9.6
NTRTDP(LP)	Manglanna Seedari	18,201	19.7	
INC	Jarsingi Balam Naidu	14,147	15.3	▼5.2
Anna Telugu Desam Party	Setti Lakshmanudu	12,373	13.4	
Majority		4,426	4.5	▼10.8
Turnout		97,996	61.5	▲6.8
TDP hold		Swing		

=== 1994 ===
1994 Andhra Pradesh Legislative Assembly election: Paderu
Party	Candidate	Votes	%	±%
TDP	Kottagulli Chittinaidu	27,923	36.5	▲9.5
INC	Balaraju Matsyarasa	15,685	20.5	▼36.5
BJP	Nandoli Gasanna	15,534	20.3	
BSP	Lake Raja Rao	10,638	13.9	
SAP	Madela Balanna	6,783	8.9	
Majority		12,238	15.3	▼12.8
Turnout		80,003	54.7	▲15.7
TDP gain from INC		Swing		

=== 1989 ===
1989 Andhra Pradesh Legislative Assembly election: Paderu
Party	Candidate	Votes	%	±%
INC	Venkataraju Matsyarasa	27,501	57.0	▲23.7
TDP	Venkataraju Matsyarasa	13,037	27.0	▼6.6
Independent	Nandoli Gasanna	7,740	16.0	
Majority		14,464	28.1	▲27.8
Turnout		51,408	39.0	▲5.4
INC gain from TDP		Swing		

=== 1985 ===
1985 Andhra Pradesh Legislative Assembly election: Paderu
Party	Candidate	Votes	%	±%
TDP	Kottagulli Chittinaidu	11,342	33.6	
INC	Matcharasa Bala Raju	11,229	33.3	▲2.3
Independent	Sallangi Narayana	6,710	19.9	
Independent	Kurusabo Jiayya	4,141	12.3	
Independent	Killo Narayana Padal	346	1.0	
Majority		113	0.3	▼8.3
Turnout		35,376	33.6	▲1.5
TDP gain from INC		Swing		

=== 1983 ===
1983 Andhra Pradesh Legislative Assembly election: Paderu
Party	Candidate	Votes	%	±%
INC	Tammarba Chittinaidu	8,810	31.0	▼9.6
Independent	Setti Lakshmanudu	6,242	22.0	▼36.5
Independent	Kottagulli Chittinaidu	3,267	11.5	
Independent	Chittapuli Mandu Padalu	2,772	9.8	
Independent	Danasani Kondanna Dora	2,265	8.0	
BJP	Kurusa Bojjayya	1,866	6.6	
Independent	Pangi Malam Naidu	991	3.5	
Independent	Giddi Appala Naidu (incumbent)	673	2.4	▼48.3
JP	Gujjalla Kondububu	533	1.9	▼48.8
Independent	N. Bheema Naik	453	1.6	
Independent	Gulella Peddabbi	338	1.2	
Independent	Bakuru Konda Babu	194	0.7	
Majority		2,568	8.6	▼1
Turnout		29,819	32.1	▲2.3
INC gain from JP		Swing		

=== 1978 ===
1978 Andhra Pradesh Legislative Assembly election: Paderu
Party	Candidate	Votes	%	±%
JP	Giddi Appalanaidu	12,563	50.7	
INC	Thamarba Chittinaidu (incumbent)	10,146	40.6	▲0.1
Independent	Sontena David Lakshmaji	1,090	4.4	
Independent	Kanta Mutyalu	557	2.2	
Independent	Adapa Gangunaidu	519	2.1	
Majority		2,507	9.6	▼2.6
Turnout		26,227	29.8	▲7.26
JP gain from INC		Swing		

=== 1972 ===
1972 Andhra Pradesh Legislative Assembly election: Paderu
Party	Candidate	Votes	%	±%
INC	Tamarba Chittinaidu	8,074	40.50	▼5.53
Independent	Raja Padal	5,641	28.30	New
Independent	Padi Rama Rao	5,556	27.87	▲10.06
ABJS	Gullela Peddabbi	664	3.33	▼5.99
Majority		2,433	12.20	▼15.94
Turnout		19,935	22.54	▲9.72
INC hold		Swing		

=== 1967 ===
1967 Andhra Pradesh Legislative Assembly election:Paderu
Party	Candidate	Votes	%	±%
INC	Tamarba Chittinaidu	4,104	46.03	
Independent	Padi Rama Rao	1,588	17.81	
PSP	L C. Patrudu	891	9.99	
ABJS	K. Krishna Naidu	831	9.32	
Independent	K. Matayalu	804	9.02	
Independent	K. Appale Naidu	352	3.95	
Independent	K. Kamaraju Naidu	346	3.88	
Majority		2,516	28.22	
Turnout		8,916	12.82	
INC win (new seat)				

== See also ==
- List of constituencies of the Andhra Pradesh Legislative Assembly
