= Achanta Assembly constituency =

Constituency of the Andhra Pradesh Legislative Assembly, India

Coordinates: 16.60°N 81.80°E

Achanta
- Constituency No. 56 for the Andhra Pradesh Legislative Assembly
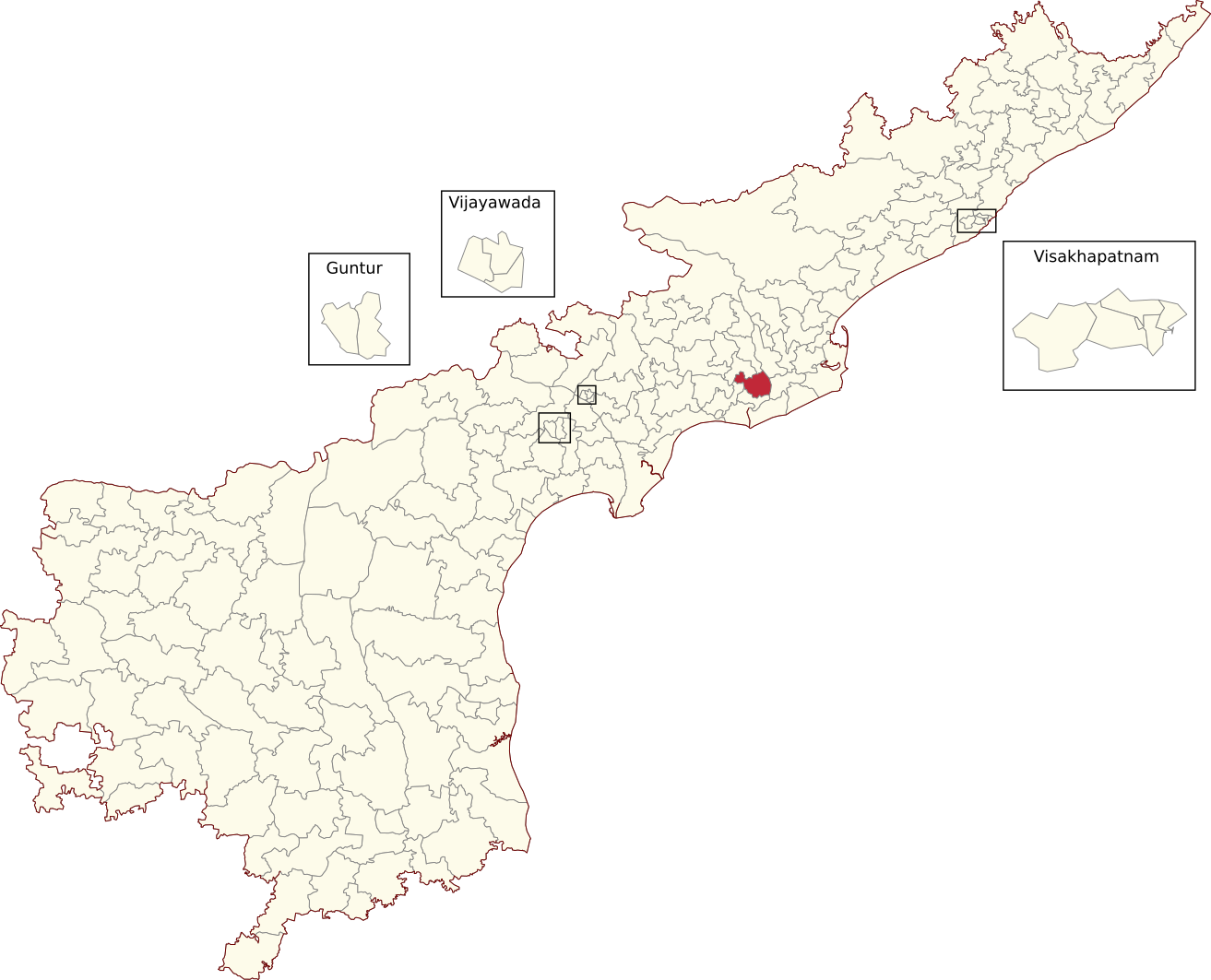
- Location of Achanta Assembly constituency within Andhra Pradesh

Constituency details
- Country: India
- Region: South India
- State: Andhra Pradesh
- District: West Godavari
- Lok Sabha constituency: Narasapuram
- Established: 1962
- Total electors: 174,229
- Reservation: None

Member of Legislative Assembly
- 16th Andhra Pradesh Legislative Assembly
- Incumbent Pithani Satyanarayana
- Party: TDP
- Alliance: NDA
- Elected year: 2024

Achanta Assembly constituency is a constituency in West Godavari district of Andhra Pradesh that elects representatives to the Andhra Pradesh Legislative Assembly in India. It is one of the seven assembly segments of Narasapuram Lok Sabha constituency.

Pithani Satyanarayana is the current MLA of the constituency, having won the 2024 Andhra Pradesh Legislative Assembly election from Telugu Desam Party. As of 2019, there are a total of 174,229 electors in the constituency. The constituency was established in 1962, as per the Delimitation Orders (1962).

== Mandals ==
The four mandals that form the assembly constituency are:

Mandal
Penugonda
Achanta
Penumantra
Poduru (Part)

== Members of the Legislative Assembly ==
Year	Member	Political party
1962	Paddala Syamasundra Rao	Communist Party of India
1967	D. Perumallu	Indian National Congress
1972	Gottimukkala Venkanna	Indian National Congress
1978	Kota Dhana Raju	Indian National Congress (I)
1983	Kota Bhaskara Rao	Telugu Desam Party
1985	Chittaranjan Alugu	Communist Party of India (Marxist)
1989	Digupati Raja Gopal	Communist Party of India (Marxist)
1994	Digupati Raja Gopal	Communist Party of India (Marxist)
1999	Johar Mocharla	Telugu Desam Party
2004	Peethala Sujatha	Telugu Desam Party
2009	Pithani Satyanarayana	Indian National Congress
2014	Pithani Satyanarayana	Telugu Desam Party
2019	Cherukuvada Sri Ranganadha Raju	YSR Congress Party
2024	Pithani Satyanarayana	Telugu Desam Party

== Election results ==
=== 1962 ===
1962 Andhra Pradesh Legislative Assembly election: Achanta
Party	Candidate	Votes	%	±%
CPI	Paddala Rao	25,306		
INC	Desari Perumallu	22,772		
Majority		2,534		
Turnout		48,078		
CPI win (new seat)				

=== 1967 ===
1967 Andhra Pradesh Legislative Assembly election: Achanta
Party	Candidate	Votes	%	±%
INC	D. Perumallu	31,630	51.93	
CPI(M)	D.S. Raju	23,935	39.29	
CPI	P.S. Rao	4,596	7.55	
Independence	P.N. Murty	751	1.23	
Majority		7,695	12.64	
Turnout		60,912	78.57	
INC gain from CPI		Swing		

=== 1972 ===
1972 Andhra Pradesh Legislative Assembly election: Achanta
Party	Candidate	Votes	%	±%
INC	Gottimukkala Venkanna	30,783	52.83	▲0.90
CPI(M)	Digu Raju	25,853	44.37	−▼5.08
RPI(K)	Arunakumar Ganta	1,635	2.81	
Majority		4,930	8.46	▼4.18
Turnout		58,271	67.57	▼11
INC hold		Swing		

=== 1978 ===
1978 Andhra Pradesh Legislative Assembly election: Achanta
Party	Candidate	Votes	%	±%
INC(I)	Kota Dhana Raju	39,504	54.4	
CPI(M)	Didupatti Sundrara Raju	30,227	33.9	−▼10.47
INC	Dasari Perumallu	11,531	15.9	▼36.93
Majority		17,882	24.2	▲15.74
Turnout		74,025	77.1	▲9.53
INC(I) gain from INC		Swing		

=== 1983 ===
1983 Andhra Pradesh Legislative Assembly election: Achanta
Party	Candidate	Votes	%	±%
TDP	Kota Bhaskara Rao	45,631	64.3	
INC	Kota Dhanaraju	17,264	24.3	▼30.1
CPI(M)	Edi Ramarao	7,611	10.7	▼19.1
Independent	Dundi Subbarao	260	0.4	
INC(J)	Vipparthi Ramaswamy	225	0.3	
Majority		28,367	39.4	▲15.2
Turnout		71,978	72.6	▼4.5
TDP hold		Swing		

=== 1985 ===
1985 Andhra Pradesh Legislative Assembly election: Achanta
Party	Candidate	Votes	%	±%
CPI(M)	Chittaranjan Alugu	51,016	67.5	▲56.8
INC	Ambuja Kamidi	19,294	25.5	▲1.2
Independent	Babu Bhujangarao Mocherla	4,523	6	
Independent	Bhaskara Rao Kotam	396	0.5	▼63.8
Independent	Narasimha Murthy	290	0.4	
Independent	Venkanna Polamuri	86	0.1	
Majority		31,722	41.5	▲2.1
Turnout		76,444	71.4	▼1.2
CPI(M) gain from TDP		Swing		

=== 1994 ===
1994 Andhra Pradesh Legislative Assembly election: Achanta
Party	Candidate	Votes	%	±%
CPI(M)	Digupati Raja Gopal	53,510	60.1	▲7
INC	Bunga Saradhi	30,872	34.7	▼8.8
BSP	Paka Satyanarayana	3,216	3.6	
BJP	Karni Sundara Rao	804	0.9	
Independent	Chikatla Surya Rao	307	0.3	
Independent	Kota Rao	290	0.3	
Majority		22,638	25	▲15.9
Turnout		90,424	72.1	▼2.5
CPI(M) hold		Swing		

=== 1999 ===
1999 Andhra Pradesh Legislative Assembly election: Achanta
Party	Candidate	Votes	%	±%
TDP	Johar Mocharla	52,954	59.5	
INC	Bunga Saradhi	30,227	33.9	−▼9.1
CPI(M)	Digupati Raja Gopal (incumbent)	5,866	6.6	▼53.5
Majority		22,727	24.6	▼0.4
Turnout		92,317	69.9	▼2.2
TDP gain from CPI(M)		Swing		

=== 2004 ===
2004 Andhra Pradesh Legislative Assembly election: Achanta
Party	Candidate	Votes	%	±%
TDP	Peethala Sujatha	46,670	49.94	−9.53
INC	Anand Prakash Chellem	41,029	43.91	+9.97
Majority		5,641	6.03	
Turnout		93,448	74.98	+7.57
TDP hold		Swing		

=== 2009 ===
2009 Andhra Pradesh Legislative Assembly election: Achanta
Party	Candidate	Votes	%	±%
INC	Satyanarayana Pithani	54,903	46.24	+2.33
TDP	Karri Radha Krishna Reddy	39,148	32.97	−16.07
PRP	Kudupudi Srinivasa Rao	16,770	14.12	
Majority		15,755	13.27	
Turnout		118,745	83.40	+8.42
INC gain from TDP		Swing		

=== 2014 ===
2014 Andhra Pradesh Legislative Assembly election: Achanta
Party	Candidate	Votes	%	±%
TDP	Satyanarayana Pithani	63,549	48.66	
YSRCP	Mudnuri Prasad Raju	59,629	45.66	
Majority		3,920	3.00	
Turnout		130,599	81.82	−1.58
TDP gain from INC		Swing		

=== 2019 ===
2019 Andhra Pradesh Legislative Assembly election: Achanta
Party	Candidate	Votes	%	±%
YSRCP	Cherukuvada Sri Ranganadha Raju	66,494	47.92	
TDP	Satyanarayana Pithani	53,608	38.64	
JSP	Javvadhi Venkata Vijayaram	13,993	10.09	
Majority		12,886	9.29	
Turnout		138,747	79.63	−2.19
YSRCP gain from TDP		Swing		

=== 2024 ===
2024 Andhra Pradesh Legislative Assembly election: Achanta
Party	Candidate	Votes	%	±%
TDP	Pithani Satyanarayana	85,402	56.73	
YSRCP	Cherukuvada Sri Ranganadha Raju	58,848	39.09	
INC	Nekkanti Venkata Satyanarayana	1,872	1.24	
NOTA	None Of The Above	1,673	1.11	
Majority		26,554	17.63	
Turnout		1,50,541		
TDP gain from YSRCP		Swing		

== See also ==
- List of constituencies of the Andhra Pradesh Legislative Assembly
