= Unguturu Assembly constituency =

Constituency of the Andhra Pradesh Legislative Assembly, India

Coordinates: 16.82°N 81.42°E

Unguturu
- Constituency No. 63 for the Andhra Pradesh Legislative Assembly
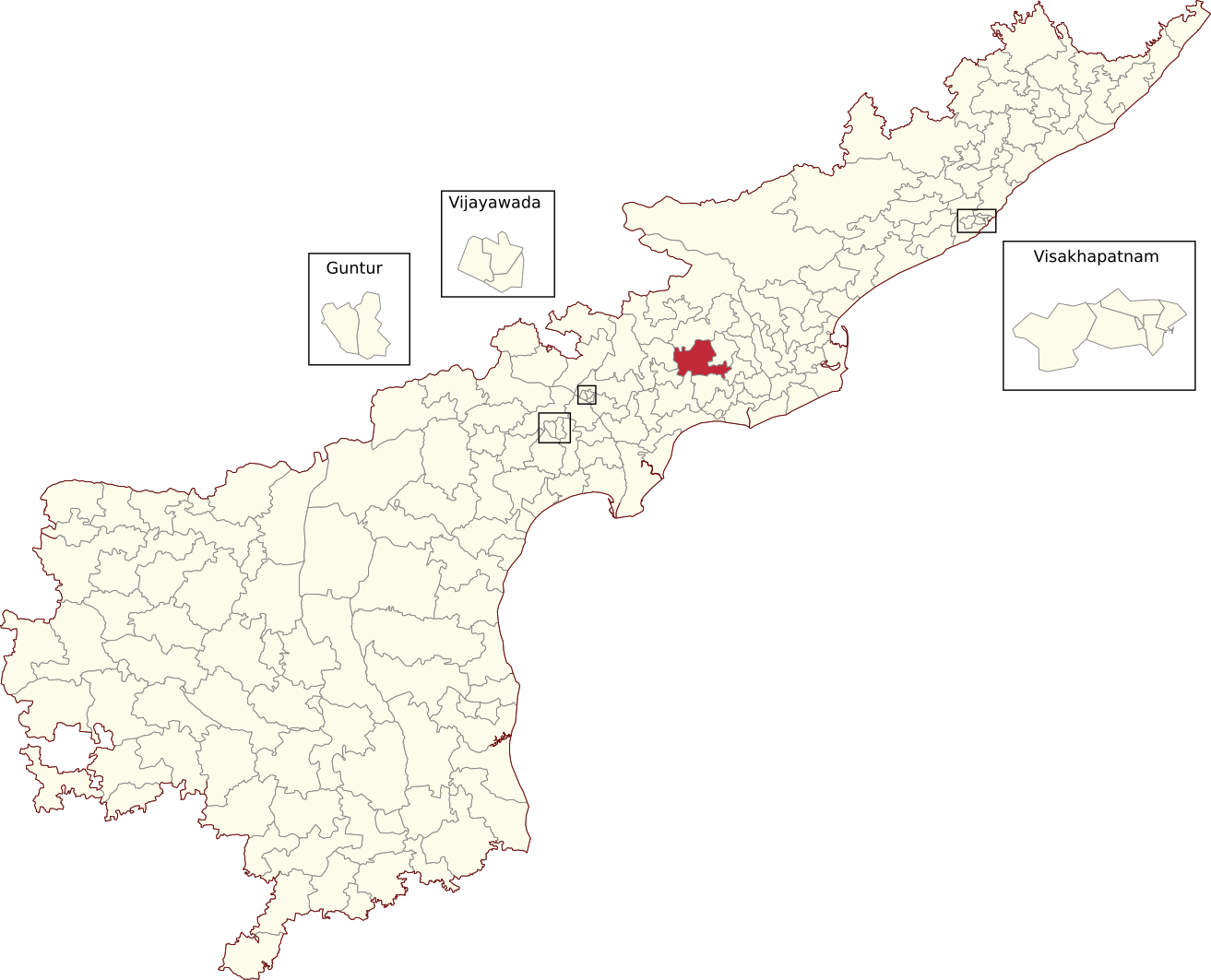
- Location of Unguturu Assembly constituency within Andhra Pradesh

Constituency details
- Country: India
- Region: South India
- State: Andhra Pradesh
- District: Eluru
- Lok Sabha constituency: Eluru
- Established: 1967
- Total electors: 200,033
- Reservation: None

Member of Legislative Assembly
- 16th Andhra Pradesh Legislative Assembly
- Incumbent Patsamatla Dharmaraju
- Party: JSP
- Alliance: NDA
- Elected year: 2024

Unguturu is a constituency in Eluru district of Andhra Pradesh that elects represtatives to the Andhra Pradesh Legislative Assembly in India. It is one of the seven assembly segments of Eluru Lok Sabha constituency.

Patsamatla Dharmaraju is the current MLA of the constituency, having won the 2024 Andhra Pradesh Legislative Assembly election from Janasena Party. As of 2019, there are a total of 200,033 electors in the constituency. The constituency was established in 1967, as per Delimination Orders (1967).

== Mandals ==
| Mandal | District |
|---|---|
| Unguturu | Eluru |
| Bhimadole | Eluru |
| Nidamarru | Eluru |
| Ganapavaram | West Godavari |

== Members of the Legislative Assembly ==
| Year | Member | Political party |
|---|---|---|
| 1967 | C. S. C. V. M. Raju | Indian National Congress |
| 1972 | C. S. C. V. M. Raju | Indian National Congress |
| 1978 | Kadiyala Satyanarayana | Indian National Congress |
| 1983 | Katamani Srinivasarao | Telugu Desam Party |
| 1985 | Katamani Srinivasarao | Telugu Desam Party |
| 1989 | Chava Ramakrushna Rao | Indian National Congress |
| 1994 | Kondreddy Viswanadham | Telugu Desam Party |
| 1999 | Kondreddy Viswanadham | Telugu Desam Party |
| 2004 | Vatti Vasant Kumar | Indian National Congress |
| 2009 | Vatti Vasant Kumar | Indian National Congress |
| 2014 | Ganni Veeranjaneyulu | Telugu Desam Party |
| 2019 | Puppala Srinivasa Rao (Vasu Babu) | YSR Congress Party |
| 2024 | Patsamatla Dharmaraju | Janasena Party |

== Election results ==
=== 2004 ===
2004 Andhra Pradesh Legislative Assembly election: Unguturu
| Party | Candidate | Votes | % | ±% |
|---|---|---|---|---|
| INC | Vatti Vasant Kumar | 77.380 | 52.91 | +4.91 |
| TDP | Immani Rajeswari | 61,700 | 42.16 | −8.37 |
| Majority | | 15,791 | 10.75 | |
| Turnout | | 146,243 | 82.21 | +5.94 |
| INC gain from TDP | | Swing | | |

=== 2009 ===
2009 Andhra Pradesh Legislative Assembly election: Unguturu
| Party | Candidate | Votes | % | ±% |
|---|---|---|---|---|
| INC | Vatti Vasant Kumar | 52,973 | 35.13 | −17.78 |
| TDP | Ganni Lakshmi Kantam | 46,514 | 30.85 | −11.31 |
| PRP | Kotagiri Vidyadhara Rao | 43,314 | 28.73 | |
| Majority | | 6,459 | 4.28 | |
| Turnout | | 150,782 | 87.48 | +5.27 |
| INC hold | | Swing | | |

=== 2014 ===
2014 Andhra Pradesh Legislative Assembly election: Unguturu
| Party | Candidate | Votes | % | ±% |
|---|---|---|---|---|
| TDP | Ganni Veeranjaneyulu | 82,118 | 50.50 | |
| YSRCP | Puppala Srinivasa Rao (Vasubabu) | 73,188 | 45.01 | |
| Majority | | 8,930 | 5.49 | |
| Turnout | | 162,595 | 86.57 | −0.91 |
| TDP gain from INC | | Swing | | |

=== 2019 ===
2019 Andhra Pradesh Legislative Assembly election: Unguturu
| Party | Candidate | Votes | % | ±% |
|---|---|---|---|---|
| YSRCP | Puppala Srinivasa Rao Vasubabu | 94,621 | 54.43% | |
| TDP | Ganni veeranjaneyulu | 61,468 | 35.36% | |
| JSP | Nowdu Venkata Ramana (Ramana Babu) | 10,721 | 6.17% | |
| Majority | | 33153 | 19.07% | |
| Turnout | | 173,841 | 86.9% | 0.33% |
| YSRCP gain from TDP | | Swing | | |

=== 2024 ===
2024 Andhra Pradesh Legislative Assembly election: Unguturu
| Party | Candidate | Votes | % | ±% |
|---|---|---|---|---|
| JSP | Patsamatla Dharmaraju | 108,894 | 59.63 | |
| YSRCP | Puppala Srinivasa Rao Vasubabu | 63949 | 35.02 | |
| INC | Pathapati Hari Kumara Raju | 3130 | 1.71 | |
| NOTA | None Of The Above | 6650 | 1.15 | |
| Majority | | 44945 | 24.61 | |
| Turnout | | 182623 | | |
| JSP gain from YSRCP | | Swing | | |

== See also ==
- List of constituencies of Andhra Pradesh Legislative Assembly
