= Rajahmundry Lok Sabha constituency =

Lok Sabha Constituency in Andhra Pradesh

Coordinates: 17.01°N 81.80°E

Rajahmundry AP-8
- Lok Sabha constituency
- Interactive Map Outlining Rajahmundry Lok Sabha constituency

Constituency details
- Country: India
- Region: South India
- State: Andhra Pradesh
- Assembly constituencies: Anaparthy; Rajanagaram; Rajahmundry City; Rajahmundry Rural; Kovvur; Nidadavole; Gopalapuram
- Established: 1952
- Reservation: None

Member of Parliament
- 18th Lok Sabha
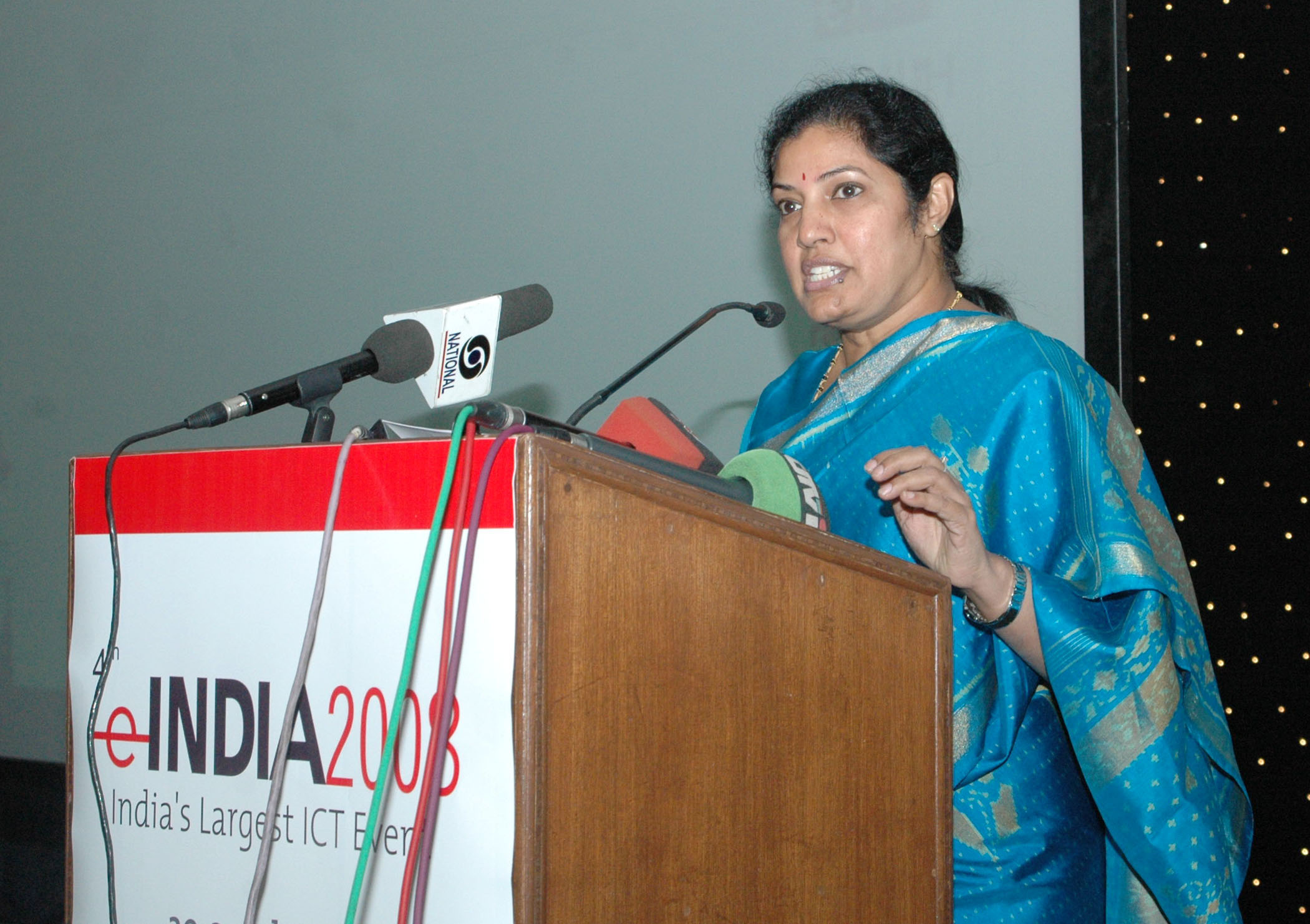
- Incumbent Daggubati Purandeswari
- Party: BJP
- Alliance: NDA
- Elected year: 2024
- Preceded by: Margani Bharat

Rajahmundry Lok Sabha constituency is one of the twenty-five lok sabha constituencies of Andhra Pradesh in India. It comprises seven assembly segments, which belong to the East Godavari district, Eluru district, and Kakinada districts.

== Assembly Segments ==
Rajahmundry Lok Sabha constituency presently comprises the following Legislative Assembly segments:

#	Name	District	Member	Party	Leading (in 2024)
40	Anaparthy	East Godavari	Nallamilli Ramakrishna Reddy	BJP	BJP
49	Rajanagaram	East Godavari	Bathula Balaramakrishna	JSP	BJP
50	Rajahmundry City	East Godavari	Adireddy Srinivas	TDP	BJP
51	Rajahmundry Rural	East Godavari	Gorantla Butchaiah Chowdary	TDP	BJP
54	Kovvur(SC)	East Godavari	Muppidi Venkateswara Rao	TDP	BJP
55	Nidadavole	East Godavari	Kandula Durgesh	JSP	BJP
66	Gopalapuram(SC)	East Godavari	Maddipati Venkata Raju	TDP	BJP

== Members of Parliament ==
Year	Member	Party
1952	Nalla Reddi Naidu	Socialist Party
1952	Kaneti Mohan Rao	Communist Party of India
1957	Datla Satyanarayana Raju	Indian National Congress
1962	Datla Satyanarayana Raju	Indian National Congress
1967	Datla Satyanarayana Raju	Indian National Congress
1971	S. B. P. Pattabhirama Rao	Indian National Congress
1977	S. B. P. Pattabhirama Rao	Indian National Congress
1980	S. B. P. Pattabhirama Rao	Indian National Congress
1984	Chundru Sri Hari Rao	Telugu Desam Party
1989	Jamuna	Indian National Congress (I)
1991	K. V. R. Chowdary	Telugu Desam Party
1996	Chitturi Ravindra	Indian National Congress
1998	Girajala Venkata Swamy Naidu	Bharatiya Janata Party
1999	S. B. P. B. K. Satyanarayana Rao	Bharatiya Janata Party
2004	Vundavalli Aruna Kumar	Indian National Congress
2009	Vundavalli Aruna Kumar	Indian National Congress
2014	Murali Mohan	Telugu Desam Party
2019	Margani Bharat	YSR Congress Party
2024	Daggubati Purandeswari	Bharatiya Janata Party

== Election results ==
=== General Election 1989 ===
General Election, 1989: Rajahmundry
Party	Candidate	Votes	%	±%
INC	Jamuna Juluri	386,314	53.63	+16.64
TDP	Chundru Srihari	327,992	45.53	−15.51
Majority		58,322	8.10	
Turnout		720,327	74.04	−1.30
INC gain from TDP		Swing		

=== General Election 1991 ===
General Election, 1991: Rajahmundry
Party	Candidate	Votes	%	±%
TDP	K. V. R. Chowdary	315,556	51.54	−6.01
INC	Jamuna Juluri	253,547	41.41	−12.22
Majority		62,009	10.13	
Turnout		612,264	62.91	−11.13
TDP gain from INC		Swing		

=== General Election 1996 ===
General Election, 1996: Rajahmundry
Party	Candidate	Votes	%	±%
INC	Chitturi Ravindra	353,861	46.78	+5.37
TDP	Chundru Srihari	258,695	34.20	−17.34
NTRTDP(LP)	Gorantla Butchaiah Chowdary	122,699	16.22	
Majority		95,166	12.58	
Turnout		756,401	67.51	+4.60
INC gain from TDP		Swing		

=== General Election 1998 ===
General Election, 1998: Rajahmundry
Party	Candidate	Votes	%	±%
BJP	Girajala Venkata Swamy Naidu	285,741	36.57	
TDP	M. V. V. S. Murthi	275,829	35.30	
INC	T. V. Satyanarayana Reddy	210,901	26.99	
Majority		9,912	1.27	
Turnout		781,346	69.70	+1.49
BJP gain from INC		Swing		

=== General Election 1999 ===
General Election, 1999: Rajahmundry
Party	Candidate	Votes	%	±%
BJP	S. B. P. B. K. Satyanarayana Rao	411,956	51.73	+15.16
INC	Chituri Ravindra	351,925	37.63	−8.90
Majority		60,031	14.10	
Turnout		796,286	70.02	−0.32
BJP hold		Swing		

=== General Election 2004 ===
General Election, 2004: Rajahmundry
Party	Candidate	Votes	%	±%
INC	Vundavalli Aruna Kumar	413,927	50.72	+6.52
BJP	Kantipudi Sarvarayudu	265,107	32.48	−19.25
Independent	S. B. P. B. K. Satyanarayana Rao	99,671	12.21	
Independent	Gurrala Paramjyothi	22,598	2.77	
Majority		148,817	18.24	
Turnout		816,125	75.97	+5.95
INC gain from BJP		Swing		

=== General Election 2009 ===
General Election, 2009: Rajahmundry
Party	Candidate	Votes	%	±%
INC	Vundavalli Aruna Kumar	357,449	35.12	−15.60
TDP	Murali Mohan	355,302	34.91	
PRP	Krishnam Raju	253,437	24.90	
Majority		2,147	0.21	
Turnout		1,017,820	80.72	+4.77
INC hold		Swing		

=== General Election 2014 ===
General Election, 2014: Rajahmundry
Party	Candidate	Votes	%	±%
TDP	Murali Mohan	630,573	54.62	+19.71
YSRCP	Boddu Venkataramana Chowdary	463,139	40.12	N/A
INC	Kandula Durgesh	21,243	1.84	−33.28
JSP	Mullapudi Satyanarayana	11,718	1.02	
BSP	Marre Babji	6,079	0.53	
NOTA	None of the Above	7,456	0.65	
Majority		1,67,434	14.50	+14.29
Turnout		1,154,381	81.22	+0.50
TDP gain from INC		Swing		

=== 2019 ===
2019 Indian general elections: Rajahmundry
Party	Candidate	Votes	%	±%
YSRCP	Margani Bharat	582,024	46.55	+6.43
TDP	Maganti Rupa	4,60,390	36.82	−17.80
JSP	Akula Satyanarayana	1,55,807	12.46	New
Majority		1,21,634	9.73	−4.77
Turnout		12,50,488	81.50	+0.28
YSRCP gain from TDP		Swing		

=== General Election 2024 ===
2024 Indian general election: Rajahmundry
Party	Candidate	Votes	%	±%
BJP	Daggubati Purandeswari	726,515	54.82	
YSRCP	Dr. Guduri Srinivas	487,376	36.77	
INC	Gidugu Rudra Raju	32,508	2.45	
NOTA	None of the Above	24,435	1.84	
Majority		239,129	18.05	
Turnout		1,329,162	81.85	
BJP gain from YSRCP		Swing		

== See also ==
- List of constituencies of the Andhra Pradesh Legislative Assembly
