= Department of Home Affairs and Disaster Management (Andhra Pradesh) =

Head of the Ministry of Home Affairs of the Government of Andhra Pradesh

Minister of Home Affairs
- Paura Rakṣaṇa Vyavahārāla mariyu Vipatthu Nirvahāṇa Śākha Mantrī
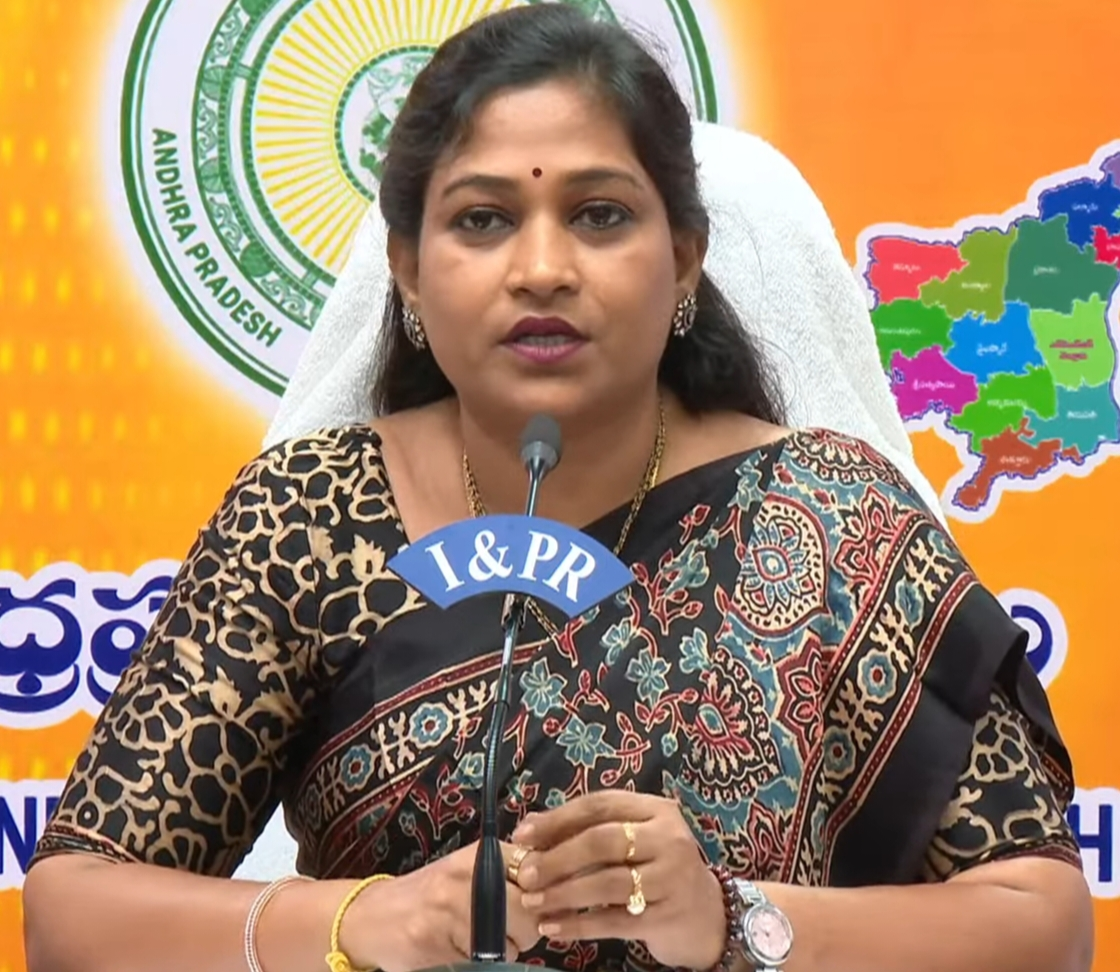
- Incumbent; Vangalapudi Anitha since 12 June 2024
- Department of Home Affairs and Disaster Management
- Abbreviation: HM
- Member of: Andhra Pradesh Cabinet
- Reports to: Governor of Andhra Pradesh; Chief Minister of Andhra Pradesh; Andhra Pradesh Legislature
- Appointer: Governor of Andhra Pradesh; on the advice of the Chief Minister of Andhra Pradesh
- Inaugural holder: Nimmakayala Chinarajappa
- Formation: 8 June 2014

The Minister of Home Affairs or Home Minister (HM) is the head of the Ministry of Home Affairs of the Government of Andhra Pradesh. The minister's chief responsibility is the maintenance of Andhra Pradesh's internal security; the state's police force comes under the ministry's jurisdiction. Occasionally, the minister is assisted by the Minister of State of Home Affairs. The Minister of Home Affairs is one of the senior-most officers in the Cabinet of Andhra Pradesh. Several Home Ministers have held the additional portfolio of Deputy Chief Minister.

From June 2014 to May 2019, the Home Minister of Andhra Pradesh was Nimmakayala Chinarajappa of the Telugu Desam Party, taking over the reins from Kiran Kumar Reddy, who was also Home Minister as well as the last Chief Minister of Andhra Pradesh before the bifurcation of United Andhra Pradesh into the present-day residual Andhra Pradesh and Telangana. Following the cabinet re-shuffling on 11 April 2022, Taneti Vanitha assumed the office under the Y. S. Jagan Mohan Reddy ministry, serving until 11 June 2024. On 14 June 2024, Vangalapudi Anitha assumed the office under the fourth N. Chandrababu Naidu ministry.

== Functions ==
The Home Department oversees various personnel and administrative functions across several departments, including the police, prisons, fire services, and printing & stationery departments, with the exception of cadre officer matters. Its responsibilities include management of the Special Protection Force (SPF), administration of the Sainik Welfare Department, and regulation under the Arms Act and related state judicial matters. Additionally, the department is authorized to sanction or withdraw prosecution, delegate magisterial powers to district collectors and district election officers during election periods, and confer magisterial powers to IAS probationers.

== List of Home Ministers ==
=== United Andhra Pradesh ===
No.	Portrait	Name	Constituency	Term of office			Party	Chief Minister	Ref.
No.	Portrait	Name	Constituency	From	To	Days in office	Party	Chief Minister	Ref.
United Andhra Pradesh
		Chegondi Harirama Jogaiah	Narasapuram				Telugu Desam Party	N. T. Rama Rao	
		M. V. Mysura Reddy					Indian National Congress		
		Alapati Dharma Rao					Indian National Congress		
		P. Indra Reddy		1995	1996	1 year	Telugu Desam Party	N. T. Rama Rao	
		Alimineti Madhava Reddy		1996	1999	4 years	Telugu Desam Party	N. Chandrababu Naidu	
		Tulla Devender Goud		1999	2004	5 years	Telugu Desam Party	N. Chandrababu Naidu	
		Kunduru Jana Reddy		2004	2009	5 years	Indian National Congress	Y. S. Rajasekhara Reddy	
		Sabitha Indra Reddy		2009	2013	4 years	Indian National Congress	Y. S. Rajasekhara Reddy; Kiran Kumar Reddy	

=== Andhra Pradesh ===
#	Portrait	Minister (Lifespan) Constituency	Term of office			Election (Term)	Party	Ministry	Chief Minister	Ref.
#	Portrait	Minister (Lifespan) Constituency	Term start	Term end	Duration	Election (Term)	Party	Ministry	Chief Minister	Ref.
1	97px97	Nimmakayala Chinarajappa (born 1953); MLA for Peddapuram	8 June 2014	29 May 2019	4 years, 355 days	2014 (14th)	Telugu Desam Party	Naidu III	N. Chandrababu Naidu	
2		Mekathoti Sucharitha (born 1972); MLA for Prathipadu	8 June 2019	7 April 2022	2 years, 303 days	2019 (15th)	YSR Congress Party	Jagan	Y. S. Jagan Mohan Reddy	
3		Taneti Vanitha (born 1973; MLA for Gopalapuram	11 April 2022	11 June 2024	2 years, 58 days	2019 (15th)	YSR Congress Party	Jagan	Y. S. Jagan Mohan Reddy	
4		Vangalapudi Anitha (born 1979); MLA for Payakaraopet	12 June 2024	Incumbent	2 years, 106 days	2024 (16th)	Telugu Desam Party	Naidu IV	N. Chandrababu Naidu	
