= Kovvur Assembly constituency =

Constituency of the Andhra Pradesh Legislative Assembly, India

Coordinates: 17.01°N 81.73°E

Kovvur
- Constituency No. 54 for the Andhra Pradesh Legislative Assembly
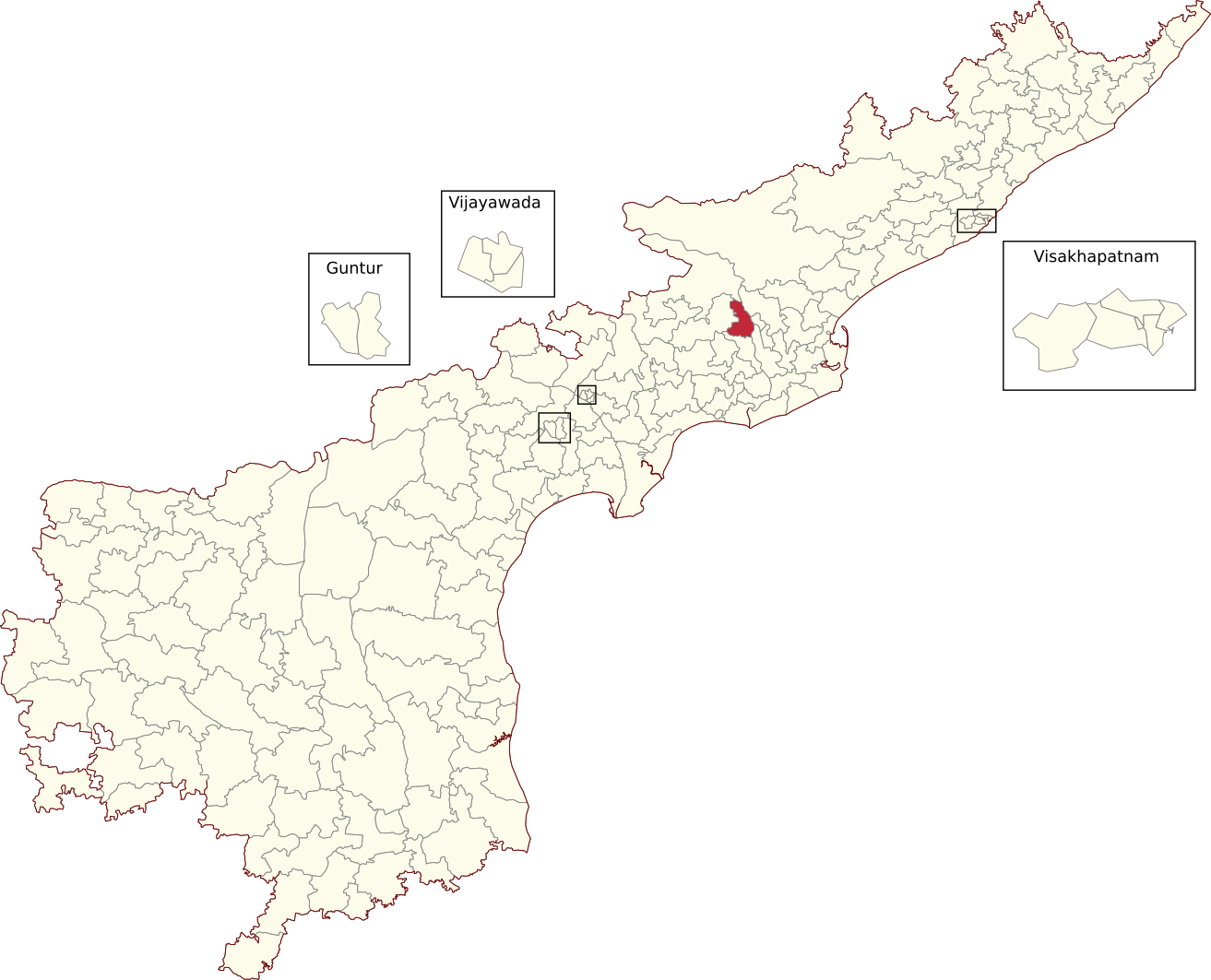
- Location of Kovvur Assembly constituency within Andhra Pradesh

Constituency details
- Country: India
- Region: South India
- State: Andhra Pradesh
- District: East Godavari
- Lok Sabha constituency: Rajahmundry
- Established: 1951
- Total electors: 176,409
- Reservation: SC

Member of Legislative Assembly
- 16th Andhra Pradesh Legislative Assembly
- Incumbent Muppidi Venkateswara Rao
- Party: TDP
- Alliance: NDA
- Elected year: 2024

Kovvur is a Scheduled Caste reserved constituency in East Godavari district of Andhra Pradesh that elects representatives to the Andhra Pradesh Legislative Assembly in India. It is one of the seven assembly segments of Rajahmundry Lok Sabha constituency.

Muppidi Venkateswara Rao is the current MLA of the constituency, having won the 2024 Andhra Pradesh Legislative Assembly election from Telugu Desam Party. As of 2019, there are a total of 176,409 electors in the constituency. The constituency was established in 1951, as per the Delimitation Orders (1951).

== History ==
It is considered a stronghold of TDP, which won all the election battles here since its inception in 1983 except in 1999 when congress won with sufficient majority. Currently, Taneti Vanita (YSR Congress) is the present Kovvur constituency's MLA, who won 2019 Assembly elections against Vangalapudi Anitha (TDP) with a majority of 25,248 votes.

== Mandals ==
The three mandals that form the assembly constituency are:

Mandal
Kovvur
Chagallu
Tallapudi

== Members of the Legislative Assembly ==
Year	Member	Political party
1952	P. Sreeramachandra Rao	Communist Party of India
1955	Alluri Bapineedu	Indian National Congress
1962	Alluri Bapineedu	Indian National Congress
1967	K. B. Rayudu	Independent
1972	Alla Hanumantha Rao	Independent
1978	Munshi Abdul Aziz	Indian National Congress
1983	Pendyala Venkata Krishna Rao	Telugu Desam Party
1985	Pendyala Venkata Krishna Rao	Telugu Desam Party
1989	Pendyala Venkata Krishna Rao	Telugu Desam Party
1994	Pendyala Venkata Krishna Rao	Telugu Desam Party
1999	G. S. Rao	Indian National Congress
2004	Pendyala Venkata Krishna Rao	Telugu Desam Party
2009	T. V. Rama Rao	Telugu Desam Party
2014	K. S. Jawahar	Telugu Desam Party
2019	Taneti Vanitha	YSR Congress Party
2024	Muppidi Venkateswara Rao	Telugu Desam Party

== Election results ==
=== 1952 ===
1952 Madras Legislative Assembly election: Kovvur
Party	Candidate	Votes	%	±%
CPI	Pinnamaneeni Sreeramachandra Rao	32,655	17.73%	
INC	Alluri Bapineedu	25,930	14.08%	14.08%
KMPP	Mallapudi Rajeswara Rao	22,664	12.30%	
Independent	Kalaputi Adeyya	22,459	12.19%	
KMPP	Pendyala Sree Ramachandra Venkatakrishna Ranga Rao	21,440	11.64%	
INC	N. Sreenivasa Rao	18,091	9.82%	9.82%
Independent	Kaigala Suryachandra Rao	13,744	7.46%	
RPI	Erlapati Venkanna	12,570	6.82%	
Independent	Jeedigunta Suryanarayana Rao	5,698	3.09%	
Independent	Jonnalagadda Sreenivasa Sastry	4,950	2.69%	
Independent	Venpala Venkateswara Rao	3,994	2.17%	
Margin of victory		6,725	3.65%	
Turnout		1,84,195	136.86%	
Registered electors		1,34,587		
CPI win (new seat)				

=== 1955 ===
1955 Andhra State Legislative Assembly election: Kovvur
Party	Candidate	Votes	%	±%
INC	Alluri Bapineedu	47,730	31.66	▲17.58
INC	Taneti Veeraraghavulu	42,357	28.10	▼2.16
CPI	Cholla Chittaranjan	28,806	19.11	
CPI	Pinnamaneeni Rao	24,207	16.06	▼1.67
Independent	Kalaputi Adeyya	3,856	2.56	▼9.63
PSP	Kandavalli Sudarsanam	3,789	2.51	
Majority		61,281	40.65	▲37
Turnout		150,745	143.44	
INC gain from CPI		Swing		

=== 1962 ===
1962 Andhra Pradesh Legislative Assembly election: Kovvur
Party	Candidate	Votes	%	±%
INC	Alluri Bapineedu	27,873		
Independent	Koduri Krishnarao	27,666		−
Majority		207		
Turnout		55,539		
INC hold		Swing		

=== 1967 ===
1967 Andhra Pradesh Legislative Assembly election: Kovvur
Party	Candidate	Votes	%	±%
Independent	K. B. Rayudu	34,556	52.70	
INC	A. Bapineedu	30,168	46.01	
Independent	A. Khani	472	0.72	
Independent	P.S.R Rao	372	0.57	
Majority		4,388	6.69	
Turnout		65,568	83.94	
Independent gain from INC		Swing		

=== 1972 ===
1972 Andhra Pradesh Legislative Assembly election: Kovvur
Party	Candidate	Votes	%	±%
Independent	Alla Hanumantha Rao	32,228	46.16	▼12.3
INC	Kuntamukkujla Buchirayunu	30,616	43.85	▼2.16
Independent	Yinnamuri Ranganayakulu	3,526	5.05	
Independent	Kanuri Gandhi	2,480	3.55	
Independent	Maddukuri Brahmandau	741	1.06	
Independent	Pinnomashiv R.C. Rao	225	0.32	▼0.25
Majority		1,612	2.31	▼4.38
Turnout		69,816	74.42	▼9.52
Independent hold		Swing		

=== 1978 ===
1985 Andhra Pradesh Legislative Assembly election: Kovvur
Party	Candidate	Votes	%	±%
INC(I)	Munshi Abdul Aziz	37,046	44.1	
JP	Alluri Choudary	35,428	42.2	▲18.3
INC	Krishna Rao Mullapudi	9,783	11.6	▼32.25
Independent	Immamuri Rangayakulu	750	0.9	
Independent	Peethala Tatayya	700	0.8	
Independent	Rama Somayajulu Kalluri	311	0.4	
Majority		1,618	1.9	▼0.41
Turnout		85,402	80.2	▲5.78
INC(I) hold		Swing		

=== 1983 ===
1983 Andhra Pradesh Legislative Assembly election: Kovvur
Party	Candidate	Votes	%	±%
TDP	Pendyala Venkata Krishna Rao	65,893	79.3%	
INC	Munshi Abdul Aziz	10,983	13.2%	▼30.9%
JP	Threeparala Laxmi	2,809	3.4%	▼38.8
BJP	Chaparla Rao	1,161	1.34%	
INC(J)	Kuntamukkala Satyanarayana	1,046	1.3%	
Independent	Tatapudi Krishivara Rao	479	0.6%	
Independent	Peethala Thatayya	238	0.3%	▼0.5
Independent	Maddukuri Brahamanandam	196	0.2%	
Independent	Potru Krishna Rangarao	171	0.2%	
Independent	Posina Satyanarayana	94	0.1%	
Margin of victory		54,910	65%	▲63.1
Turnout		84,472	72.3%	▼7.9
Registered electors		116,815		
TDP gain from INC(I)		Swing		

=== 1985 ===
1985 Andhra Pradesh Legislative Assembly election: Kovvur
Party	Candidate	Votes	%	±%
TDP	Pendyala Venkata Krishna Rao	61,899	67	▼12.3
INC	Immanni Rao	29,116	31.5	▲18.3
Independent	Yelamanchili Mukundarao	454	0.5	
Independent	Md. Fijulla	395	0.4	
Independent	Gangisetti Musileswararao	373	0.4	
Independent	Kundula Venkatrao	172	0.2	
Majority		32,783	35.1	▼29.9
Turnout		93,526	71.7	▼0.6
TDP hold		Swing		

=== 1989 ===
1989 Andhra Pradesh Legislative Assembly election: Kovvur
Party	Candidate	Votes	%	±%
TDP	Pendyala Venkata Krishna Rao	60,116	52.9	▼14.1
INC	Rafiulla Baig	52,824	46.4	▲14.9
Independent	Lakshmi Penmatcha	466	0.4	
Independent	Veeramalla Krishna	217	0.2	
Independent	Anupindi Rao	136	0.1	
Majority		7,292	6.3	▼28.8
Turnout		116,32	77.8	▲6.1
TDP hold		Swing		

=== 1994 ===
1994 Andhra Pradesh Legislative Assembly election: Kovvur
Party	Candidate	Votes	%	±%
TDP	Pendyala Rao	66,395	55.2%	▲2.3
INC	G.S. Rao	50,153	41.7%	▼4.7%
BSP	Santha Bethala	1,832	1.5%	
BJP	Shaik Subhani	513	0.4%	
Independent	Guduri Sarveswararao	460	0.4%	
Independent	Kethagani Pichayya	378	0.4%	
Independent	Velicheti Ramakrishna	212	0.2%	
Independent	Jayaraju Komarapu	167	0.1%	
Marxist Communist Party of India (SRIVASTAVA)	Maddipatla Satyanarayana	99	0.1%	
Independent	Kommireddi Ramarao	78	0.1%	
Independent	Balusu Rao	64	0.1%	
Independent	Edupuganti Ramarao	22	0.0%	
Margin of victory		16,242	13.3%	▲7
Turnout		122,091	77.6%	▼0.2
Registered electors		157,309		
TDP hold		Swing		

=== 1999 ===
1999 Andhra Pradesh Legislative Assembly election: Kovvur
Party	Candidate	Votes	%	±%
INC	G.S. Rao	63,721	51%	▲9.3
TDP	Pendyala Rao	57,185	45.8%	▼9.4
INC	Alluri Bapineedu	25,930	14.08%	14.08%
Independent	Borra Rao	3,073	2.5%	
Independent	P.V. Rao	279	0.2%	
Independent	Gandham Rao	240	0.2%	9.82%
Independent	Kurasala Murthy	170	0.1%	
Independent	Dayana Rama Krishna	107	0.1%	
Independent	Valavala Sarva Rayudu	53	0.0%	
Independent	Kodamanchili Rao	49	0.0%	
Margin of victory		6,536	5.1%	▼8.2
Turnout		128,921	76.6%	▼1
Registered electors		168,316		
INC gain from TDP		Swing		

=== 2004 ===
2004 Andhra Pradesh Legislative Assembly election: Kovvur
Party	Candidate	Votes	%	±%
TDP	Pendyala Venkata Krishna Rao	65,329	48.26	+2.47
INC	G S Rao	63,998	47.27	−3.76
Majority		1,331	28.89	
Turnout		135,378	79.52	+5.33
TDP gain from INC		Swing		

=== 2009 ===
2009 Andhra Pradesh Legislative Assembly election: Kovvur
Party	Candidate	Votes	%	±%
TDP	T V Rama Rao	55,669	41.80	−6.46
INC	Koyye Moshenu Raju	40,191	30.18	−17.09
PRP	Bunga Saradhi	29,285	21.99	
Majority		15,478	11.62	
Turnout		133,179	83.78	+4.26
TDP hold		Swing		

=== 2014 ===
2014 Andhra Pradesh Legislative Assembly election: Kovvur
Party	Candidate	Votes	%	±%
TDP	Kothapalli Samuel Jawahar	74,661	51.88	
YSRCP	Taneti Vanitha	61,916	43.02	
Majority		12,745	8.86	
Turnout		143,910	85.30	+1.52
TDP hold		Swing		

=== 2019 ===
2019 Andhra Pradesh Legislative Assembly election: Kovvur
Party	Candidate	Votes	%	±%
YSRCP	Taneti Vanitha	79,892	52.35	
TDP	Vangalapudi Anitha	54,644	35.80	
BSP	Ravi Kumar Murthy Tamballapalli	11,677	7.65	
Majority		25,248	16.54	
Turnout		1,52,611	86.41	0.1
YSRCP gain from TDP		Swing		

=== 2024 ===
2024 Andhra Pradesh Legislative Assembly election: Kovvur
Party	Candidate	Votes	%	±%
TDP	Muppidi Venkateswara Rao	92,743	58.29	
YSRCP	Talari Venkat Rao	58,797	36.95	
INC	Arigela Aruna Kumari	1,897	1.19	
NOTA	None Of The Above	2,465	1.55	
Majority		33,946	21.34	
Turnout		1,59,111		
TDP gain from YSRCP		Swing		

== See also ==
- List of constituencies of the Andhra Pradesh Legislative Assembly
