= S. B. P. Pattabhirama Rao =

Indian politician (1911–1988)

- Born: 30 December 1911; Kapileswarapuram, Godavari District, British India
- Died: 21 September 1988 (aged 76); Madras, India
- Title: Member of Parliament
- Term: 1971–1984
- Predecessor: Lt. Col. D. S. Raju, INC
- Successor: Chundru Sri Hari Rao, TDP
- Political party: Indian National Congress

Notes
- Minister in Composite Madras State, 1952–54, Andhra State 1954–55 and Andhra Pradesh, 1956–60, 1960–62

Sri Balusu Prabhakara Pattabhirama Rao (30 December 1911 – 21 September 1988) was an Indian Telugu industrialist, politician, and the zamindar of Kapileswarapuram. He was a Minister in Composite Madras State, 1952–1954, Andhra State during 1954–1955. He was a Minister in Andhra Pradesh, 1956–1960 and 1960–1962. He was elected to 5th Lok Sabha, 6th Lok Sabha, 7th Lok Sabha, from the Rajahmundry Lok Sabha constituency.

== Early life ==
S. B. P. Pattabhirama Rao was born to Sri Balusu Butchi Sarvarayudu, the zamindar of the Kapileswarapuram Samsthanam in East Godavari District, and his wife S. B. Lakshmi Venkata Subbamma Rao on 30 December 1911. He was educated at P.R. College, Kakinada, and Law College, Madras. He had a brother named S. B. P. B. K. Satyanarayana Rao who was a Union Minister of State for Agriculture in the Vajpayee government.

== Life and career ==
Pattabhirama Rao was a Member in Andhra Pradesh Legislative Assembly from 1952 to 1967, and of the Legislative Council from 1968 to 1970.

Rao was a Minister in Rajaji cabinate in Composite Madras State, (1952–1953). He worked as an Education Minister in T. Prakasam cabinate in Andhra State during 1954–1955. He was a Minister in N. Sanjiva Reddy cabinate in Andhra Pradesh during 1956-1960 and Damodaram Sanjivayya cabinate during 1960-1962 as an Education and Transport Minister.

Rao worked as a Member of Fifth Lok Sabha, 1971–77, Sixth Lok Sabha, 1977–1979 and Seventh Lok Sabha 1980–1984. He was a Union Minister of State in the Indira Gandhi government.

Rao was the recipient of an honorary D.Litt. from Andhra University and an honorary Dr. of Laws from Sri Venkateswara University.

Rao died in Madras on 21 September 1988, at the age of 76.
