= Maddipati Venkata Raju =

Indian politician from Andhra Pradesh

Member of the Andhra Pradesh Legislative Assembly
- Incumbent
- Assumed office 2024
- Preceded by: Talari Venkat Rao
- Constituency: Gopalapuram

Personal details
- Party: Telugu Desam Party

Maddipati Venkata Raju is an Indian politician from Andhra Pradesh. He is a member of Telugu Desam Party.

== Political career ==
Raju was elected as the Member of the Legislative Assembly representing the Gopalapuram Assembly constituency in 2024 Andhra Pradesh Legislative Assembly elections. He won the elections by a margin of 26784 votes defeating Taneti Vanitha of the YSR Congress Party.

== Electoral performance ==
2024 Andhra Pradesh Legislative Assembly election: Gopalapuram
Party	Candidate	Votes	%	±%
TDP	Maddipati Venkata Raju	1,14,420	54.06	+3.59
YSRCP	Taneti Vanitha	87,636	41.4	−0.68
NOTA	None Of The Above	4,500	2.13	+0.00
	Various	1,681	0.80	+1.28
Majority		26,784	12.66	
Turnout		2,08,237	98.38	+0.61
TDP gain from YSRCP		Swing		
