= Burugupalli Sesharao =

Indian politician

Burugupalli Sesharao (born 1965) is an Indian politician from Andhra Pradesh. He was a former two time member of the Andhra Pradesh Legislative Assembly in 2009 and 2014, from Nidadavole Assembly constituency in the then West Godavari district, representing the Telugu Desam Party.

== Early life ==
Sesharao is from Nidadavole, in the reorganised East Godavari district, Andhra Pradesh. He is the son of Rattayya. He passed Class 10 and later discontinued his studies. He declared assets worth Rs.1 crore in his 2009 affidavit to the Election Commission of India.

== Career ==
Sesharao won the Nidadavole Assembly constituency in the 2014 Andhra Pradesh Legislative Assembly election representing the Telugu Desam Party. He polled 81,591 votes and defeated his nearest rival, S. Rajiv Krishna of the YSR Congress Party, by a margin of 6,359 votes. He first became an MLA winning the Nidadavole seat in the 2009 Andhra Pradesh Legislative Assembly election, where he polled 51,680 and defeated his closest opponent, Geddam Srinivas Naidu of the Indian National Congress, by a margin of 5,766 votes. However, he lost the 2019 election to Naidu by a margin of 21,688 votes.

In May 2025, he was appointed chairman of the Andhra Pradesh State Skill Development Corporation (APSSDC).
