= Vundavalli Aruna Kumar =

Indian politician (born 1954)

Member of Parliament, Lok Sabha
- In office 2004–2014
- Preceded by: SBPBK Satyanarayana Rao
- Succeeded by: Murali Mohan
- Constituency: Rajamahendravaram

Personal details
- Born: 4 August 1954 (age 72) Rajamahendravaram, Andhra Pradesh.
- Citizenship: India
- Party: Indian National Congress
- Spouse: Smt. Undavalli Jyothi
- Children: Vundavalli Sravanthi (Only Daughter)
- Parents: Shri Vundavalli Venkata Subbarao (father); Smt. Vundavalli Lakshmi (mother)
- Education: B.Com, LL.B
- Alma mater: Government College Rajahmundry, C.R. Reddy Law College, Eluru
- Occupation: Politician
- Known for: Public Speaking & Political Analysis
- Committees: former Member, Congress Working Committee
- As of 22 May, 2019

Vundavalli Aruna Kumar (born 4 August 1954) is an Indian politician, lawyer, political analyst and a former Member of Parliament of India. He was elected to the 14th Lok Sabha and 15th Lok Sabha from Rajahmundry constituency of Andhra Pradesh. He was a member of the Indian National Congress party.

== Early life ==
Vundavalli Aruna Kumar was born in Rajamahendravaram, East Godavari district, Andhra Pradesh. His father, Vundavalli Venkata Subba Rao had a timber business and was the founder-president of the Rajahmundry Chamber of Commerce in the year 1944. His mother Smt. Vundavalli Lakshmi was the Founder-Secretary of the Guild of Service and Indian Red Cross Society, Rajamahendravaram Branch. He earned his bachelor's degree in commerce (B.Com.) from Government College, Rajamahendravaram, and also obtained a bachelor's degree in law (L.L.B) from C. R. Reddy Law College, Eluru.

== Career ==
=== Jai Andhra Movement ===
Arun Kumar participated in the 1972 Jai Andhra movement as a student. He runs a weekly publication, Eevaram Janavaarta, that covers contemporary political issues.

=== Public Speaking and Translation ===
Arun Kumar is well known for his translation expertise. He acted as a translator for Congress Party President Sonia Gandhi and her son Rahul Gandhi whenever they had to address the people of Andhra Pradesh.

=== Political career ===
Arun Kumar was known for his public speaking abilities and in 1983 he was noticed by then President, Andhra Pradesh Congress Committee Dr. Y. S. Rajasekhara Reddy. With the encouragement and support from Y. S. Rajasekhara Reddy in 2004 and 2009, he won the Lok Sabha elections from Rajahmundry. In 2009, he won against two prominent film actors, Telugu Desam Party candidate, Murali Mohan, one of the richest actors in Telugu cinema, and Praja Rajyam Party candidate, Krishnam Raju, who had a great influence in Rajahmundry. He held various positions mentioned below.

5 Aug. 2004, 2006	Member, Committee on Science & Technology, Environment & Forests
7 Aug. 2004, 2006	Member, Committee on Government Assurances
6 Aug. 2009	Member, Committee on Public Accounts
31 Aug. 2009	Chairman, Committee on Petroleum and Natural Gas
16 Sep. 2009	Member, Consultative Committee, Ministry of Law & justice
19 Oct. 2009	Member, Committee on General Purposes
1 May 2010	Member, Committee on Public Accounts

=== Protest Against Ramoji Rao and Margadarsi Group ===
Arun Kumar has filed a case against Ramoji Rao and Margadarsi group stating that the group is performing illegal financial activities, the case is in the court and yet the result is to be heard.

=== Retirement from Election Politics ===
Vexed with the political scenario in the Indian Parliament, 2014, during the bifurcation of Andhra Pradesh State in which his party Indian National Congress did not listen to his concern about the future of the state and moreover the absence of Dr. Y. S. Rajasekhara Reddy (died in September 2009) in his life let him to step down from election politics forever.

=== Protest to demand the implementation of AP Reorganisation Act, 2014 ===
After the bifurcation of Andhra Pradesh state the government at central was charges with BJP and at state it was taken over by TDP. Both TDP and BJP allied during elections and were of least concern in implementing the AP reorganisation act, 2014 and construction of Polavaram Project. Vexed with the group politics, Vundavalli Arun Kumar started writing letters to both the governments for explanation and has been demanding for open discussion regarding the same through various platforms and press meets.

== Electoral History ==
=== Lok Sabha ===
Year	Constituency	Party	Votes	%	Opponent	Party	Votes	%	Result	Margin	%
2004	Rajahmundry	INC	4,13,927	50.72	Kantipudi Sarvarayudu	BJP	2,65,107	32.48	Won	+1,48,820	+18.24
2009	Rajahmundry	INC	3,57,449	35.12	M. Murali Mohan	TDP	3,55,302	34.91	Won	+2,147	+0.21

== Books ==
Arun Kumar has great concern about the newly formed state Andhra Pradesh and has written a book Vibhajana Katha criticizing both the parties Indian National Congress and Bharatiya Janata Party who ruthlessly divided the state of Andhra Pradesh without providing a proper solution for the newly born state without a capital city. He has been inviting the State Government which is ruled by Telugu Desam Party for discussion regarding the bifurcation act and strategies to be followed during the parliament sessions which the later people don't recognize.

Arun Kumar was a very close associate of then Chief Minister of Andhra Pradesh Y. S. Rajasekhara Reddy and has been very loyal to him and was heart broken with demise of Y. S. Rajasekhara Reddy. Arun Kumar wrote a book Y. S. R tho Undavalli Arun Kumar which was released by former Andhra Pradesh Chief Minister K. Rosaiah in which he wrote his experiences with Y. S. Rajasekhara Reddy and how Y. S. Rajasekhara Reddy could become people's leader.

== Personal life ==
He married Jyothi (his family friend) and has one daughter named Sravanthi. His mother-in-law asked him to find a pensionable job to which he agreed and has written bank examinations in which he was not successful as he was purely interested in politics only. His mother-in-law was satisfied and happy when he became the Member of the Indian Parliament in 2004.
