= Maddala Suneeta =

Indian politician

Maddala Suneeta is an Indian politician from Andhra Pradesh. She is a former Member of the Legislative Assembly in 2004 from Gopalapuram representing the Indian National Congress.

She became an MLA for the firs time winning the 2004 Andhra Pradesh Legislative Assembly election from Gopalapuram Assembly constituency representing the Indian National Congress Party. She polled 67,500 votes and defeated her nearest rival, Abbulu Koppaka of the Telugu Desam Party, by a margin of 7622 votes. In 2018, she joined YSR Congress Party.
