= S. B. P. B. K. Satyanarayana Rao =

Indian industrialist and politician

Member of Parliament
- Minister: Minister of State for Agriculture in the Vajpayee government
- Constituency: Rajahmundry
- In office 1999–2001

Personal details
- Born: 23 September 1921 Kapileswarapuram, Godavari District, British India
- Died: 21 January 2011 (aged 89) Hyderabad
- Party: Bharatiya Janata Party
- Spouse: Rajarajeswari Devi
- As of June, 2014

Sri Balusu Prabhakara Buchi Krishna Satyanarayana Rao (23 September 1921 – 21 January 2011) was a Telugu Indian industrialist, politician, and the zamindar of Kapileswarapuram. He was a Union Minister and active in the Circar districts of India. He served as Minister of State for Agriculture in the Vajpayee government for two years between 1999 and 2001. He was elected to the AP Legislative Council from the North Circar Districts Graduates Constituency in 1958 and 1980. His last rites were performed at his native village.

== Early life ==
S. B. P. B. K. Satyanarayana Rao was born to Sri Balusu Butchi Sarvarayudu, the zamindar of the Kapileswarapuram Samsthanam in East Godavari District, and his wife S. B. Lakshmi Venkata Subbamma Rao on 23 September 1921. He had a brother named S. B. P. Pattabhi rama Rao, who was a Minister in the Composite Madras, Andhra Pradesh, and member of 5th Lok Sabha, 6th Lok Sabha, 7th Lok Sabha, from Rajahmundry Lok Sabha constituency.

== Career ==
S. B. P. B. K. Satyanarayana Rao worked as a sarpanch from 1953 to 1964, as a panchayat samithi president from 1959 to 1964, and as the East Godavari Zilla Parishad Chairman from 1964 to 1976. Later, Rao was elected to the AP Legislative Council from the North Circar Districts Graduates Constituency in 1958 and 1980. He also was elected to the Lok Sabha from Rajahmundry as a member of the BJP and worked as a Union Minister of State for Agriculture. S. B. P. B. K. Satyanarayana Rao started his political career with the Congress Party, later shifted to the Janata Party, joined the Telugu Desam Party (TDP) during N. T. Rama Rao's stewardship, and later became affiliated with the Bharatiya Janata Party (BJP).

S. B. P. B. K. Satyanarayana Rao also established the SRVBSJB Maharani College in Peddapuram in 1967. He founded the Sarvaraya Harikatha Pathasala, named after his father, in Kapileswarapuram. This Harikatha pathasala is known for training young artists in the Harikatha art form through the teachings of well known Harikatha artists. Harikatha artists like Daliparthi Uma Maheswari, who is the only female Harikatha artist to perform in Sanskrit, was trained at this institute established by Rao. Rao also patronized the Veda Pathashala at Kapileswarapuram established by his family. He was a trustee of the Sarvaraya Educational Trust and also established the Sri Sarvaraya Dharmika Vidya Trust in 1991 to print Hindu literary works, including the Telugu poet Pothana's Andhra Bhagavatham.

S. B. P. B. K. Satyanarayana Rao and other members of the Kapileswapuram Balusu zamindari family established Sri Sarvaraya Sugars in 1959 at Chelleru and Sarvaraya Textiles in Kakinada by building spinning mills.
