= Muppidi Venkateswara Rao =

Indian politician from Andhra Pradesh

Member of the Andhra Pradesh Legislative Assembly
- Incumbent
- Assumed office 2024
- Preceded by: Taneti Vanitha
- Constituency: Kovvur

Personal details
- Party: Telugu Desam Party

Muppidi Venkateswara Rao is an Indian politician from Andhra Pradesh. He is a member of Telugu Desam Party.

== Political career ==
Rao was first elected as a Member of the Andhra Pradesh Legislative Assembly from the Gopalapuram Assembly constituency in the 2014 elections. In the 2024 Andhra Pradesh Legislative Assembly election, he was elected as the Member of the Legislative Assembly from the Kovvur Assembly constituency.

== Electoral performance ==
2024 Andhra Pradesh Legislative Assembly election: Kovvur
Party	Candidate	Votes	%	±%
TDP	Muppidi Venkateswara Rao	92,743	58.29	
YSRCP	Talari Venkat Rao	58,797	36.95	
INC	Arigela Aruna Kumari	1,897	1.19	
NOTA	None Of The Above	2,465	1.55	
Majority		33,946	21.34	
Turnout		1,59,111		
TDP gain from YSRCP		Swing		

2019 Andhra Pradesh Legislative Assembly election: Gopalapuram
Party	Candidate	Votes	%	±%
YSRCP	Talari Venkat Rao	111,785	56.04	
TDP	Muppidi Venkateswara Rao	74,324	37.26	
BSP	Sirra Bharatha Rao	5,882	2.95	
Majority		37,461	18.78	
Turnout		1,99,464		
YSRCP hold		Swing		

2014 Andhra Pradesh Legislative Assembly election: Gopalapuram
Party	Candidate	Votes	%	±%
TDP	Muppidi Venkateswara Rao	95,299	51.14	
YSRCP	Talari Venkat Rao	83,759	40.62	
Majority		11,540	10.52	
Turnout		186,343	86.91	+1.15
TDP hold		Swing		
