= Golla Babu Rao =

Indian politician

Member of Parliament, Rajya Sabha
- Incumbent
- Assumed office 3 April 2024
- Preceded by: C. M. Ramesh
- Constituency: Andhra Pradesh

Member of Andhra Pradesh Legislative Assembly
- In office 2019–2024
- Preceded by: Vangalapudi Anitha
- Succeeded by: Vangalapudi Anitha
- Constituency: Payakaraopeta
- In office 2012–2014
- Preceded by: Himself
- Succeeded by: Vangalapudi Anitha
- Constituency: Payakaraopeta
- In office 2009–2012
- Preceded by: Venkata Rao
- Succeeded by: Himself
- Constituency: Payakaraopeta

Personal details
- Born: 10 August 1954 (age 72)
- Party: YSR Congress Party (2012-present)
- Other political affiliations: Indian National Congress (2009-2012)
- Education: Master of Economics; LLB
- Occupation: Politician

Golla Babu Rao (born 10 August 1954) is an Indian politician, currently serving as Rajya Sabha member representing YSR Congress Party. He also served as APPSC Group I officer. Before entering politics, Babu Rao worked as a Joint Commissioner of Panchayat Raj and Rural Development in Hyderabad, Telangana. He was elected thrice to the Andhra Pradesh Legislative Assembly from Payakaraopet. He contested for 2009, 2014, 2019 and one by election 2012, except 2014 he won all the remaining three elections. On 20 February 2024, he was unanimously elected to the Rajya Sabha as a YSR Congress Party candidate along with Y. V. Subba Reddy and Meda Raghunath Reddy.

== Personal life and education ==
Babu Rao was born to Golla Satyam and Golla Sayamma in Kovvali, Denduluru Mandal, Andhra Pradesh. He did his elementary schooling from the Salvation Army Elementary School and passed matriculation from the Zilla Parishad High School, both in Kovvali. After completing his intermediate (plus two) and B.Com. at Sir C.R. Reddy College in Eluru, he pursued a Post Graduate Degree in Economics from the D.N. Jain college, Jabalpur University, Madhya Pradesh. He also has an LLB Degree from the Osmania University, Hyderabad. He married Vasantha Kumari on 24 January 1988 and has a son and a daughter.

== Career ==
Golla Babu Rao began his professional career in the Group-I services in 1986, AP, as a District Panchayat Officer. He then worked as District Panchayat Officer, Khammam up to 1991. Later, he worked in Visakhapatnam from 1991 to 1993 as chief executive officer SETWIN, Employment Generation and Youth Service. He was then promoted as the Deputy Development Officer and posted to Zilla Parishad, Visakhapatnam from 1993 to 1994. From 1994 to 1995, he was promoted again as a chief executive officer and posted to Zilla Parishad, Cuddapah. He came back to Visakhapatnam from 1995 to 1997 as CEO ZP. He also worked at East Godavari from 1997 to 2002 as CEO, Zilla Parishad. He was again posted as the CEO, Zilla Parishad, Visakhapatnam from 2002 to February 2004. And till his voluntary retirement in 2009, he worked as the Joint Commissioner of Panchayat Raj in Hyderabad.

== Political life ==
As an ardent follower of former Andhra Pradesh chief minister late YS Rajasekhara Reddy, Babu Rao began his political career in 2009, as a member of the AP Legislative Assembly from Payakaraopeta, a reserved constituency in Visakhapatnam district. Golla Babu Rao also lost one of his close friends, P. Subramanyam, a 1983 batch IAS officer, in the same helicopter crash with the late Chief Minister YSR.

As an MLA, he implemented many schemes of the State Government and also worked on drinking water projects. Attempts are being made to prepare design for strong embankments on the Varaha river. In 2019, he was elected as a Member of Legislative Assembly from Payakaraopet Assembly constituency in Andhra Pradesh on YSR Congress Party ticket. In January 2024, he was dropped from the MLA list to contest the 2024 Assembly election but was later given a chance to contest the Rajya Sabha elections.
