= Taneti Vanitha =

Indian politician

Taneti Vanita

Minister of Home Affairs and Disaster Management Government of Andhra Pradesh
- In office 11 April 2022 – 4 June 2024
- Governor: Biswabhusan Harichandan; S. Abdul Nazeer
- Chief Minister: Y. S. Jagan Mohan Reddy
- Preceded by: Mekathoti Sucharitha
- Succeeded by: Vangalapudi Anitha

Minister of Women and Child Welfare Government of Andhra Pradesh
- In office 8 June 2019 – 7 April 2022
- Governor: E. S. L. Narasimhan; Biswabhusan Harichandan
- Chief Minister: Y. S. Jagan Mohan Reddy
- Preceded by: Paritala Sunitha
- Succeeded by: K. V. Ushashri Charan

Member of Legislative Assembly, Andhra Pradesh
- In office 23 May 2019 – 4 June 2024
- Preceded by: Kothapalli Samuel Jawahar
- Succeeded by: Muppidi Venkateswara Rao
- Constituency: Kovvur
- In office 16 May 2009 – 1 March 2014
- Preceded by: Maddala Sunitha
- Succeeded by: Muppidi Venkateswara Rao
- Constituency: Gopalapuram

Personal details
- Born: 24 June 1973 (age 53) Gopalapuram, Andhra Pradesh, India
- Party: YSR Congress Party
- Other political affiliations: Telugu Desam Party
- Occupation: Politician

Taneti Vanitha is an Indian politician, former Minister of Home Affairs, Prisons, Fire Services and Disaster Management in the Government of Andhra Pradesh and a Member of Andhra Pradesh Legislative Assembly from Kovvur, West Godavari district. She got the majority of about 25,000 votes in the 2019 Indian general election. She served as the Minister of Home, Prisons, and Fire Services of Andhra Pradesh from 2022 to 2024.

== Career ==
Vanitha was elected as MLA for Gopalapuram on the Telugu Desam Party ticket but defected to the YSR Congress party in November 2012. She came out of TDP due to its stand on Andhra Pradesh bifurcation and then joined YSR Congress Party. In 2019, she contested from Kovvuru as YSRCP candidate and won with a majority of 25,000 votes and was appointed Minister of Women and Child Welfare in Y. S. Jagan Mohan Reddy ministry. In April 2022 cabinet reshuffle, Vanitha was appointed Minister for Home and Disaster Management.
