= Gopalapuram Assembly constituency =

Constituency of the Andhra Pradesh Legislative Assembly, India

Coordinates: 17.10°N 81.54°E

Gopalapuram
- Constituency No. 66 for the Andhra Pradesh Legislative Assembly
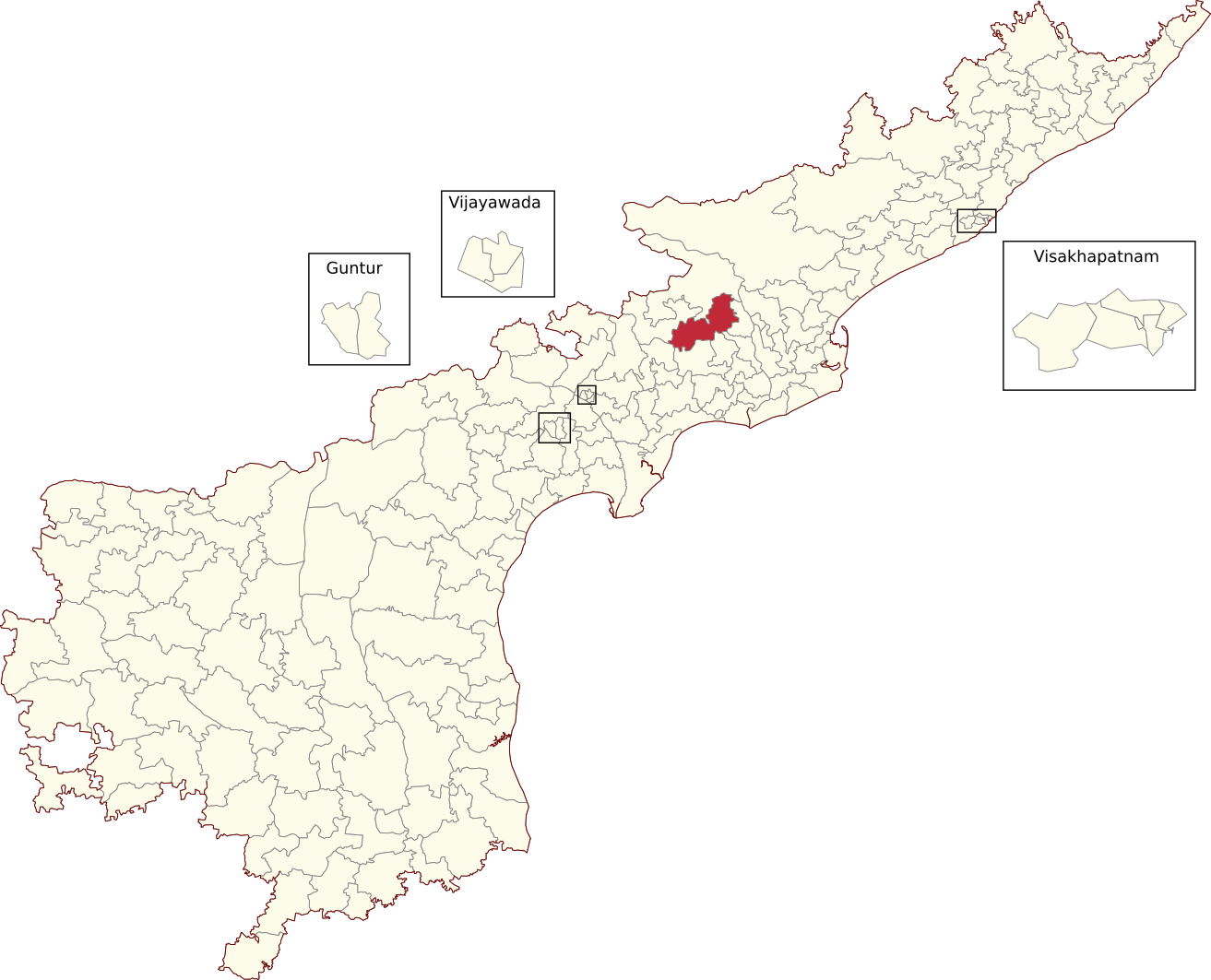
- Location of Gopalapuram Assembly constituency within Andhra Pradesh

Constituency details
- Country: India
- Region: South India
- State: Andhra Pradesh
- District: East Godavari
- Lok Sabha constituency: Rajahmundry
- Established: 1962
- Total electors: 232,058
- Reservation: SC

Member of Legislative Assembly
- 16th Andhra Pradesh Legislative Assembly
- Incumbent Maddipati Venkata Raju
- Party: TDP
- Alliance: NDA
- Elected year: 2024

Gopalapuram is a Scheduled Caste reserved constituency in East Godavari district, and Eluru districts of Andhra Pradesh that elects representatives to the Andhra Pradesh Legislative Assembly in India. It is one of the seven assembly segments of Rajahmundry Lok Sabha constituency.

Maddipati Venkata Raju is the current MLA of the constituency, having won the 2024 Andhra Pradesh Legislative Assembly election from Telugu Desam Party. The constituency was established in 1962, as per the Delimitation Orders (1962).

== Mandals ==
The four mandals that form the assembly constituency are:

Mandal	District
Nallajerla	East Godavari
Devarapalli	East Godavari
Gopalapuram	East Godavari
Dwaraka Tirumala	Eluru

== Members of the Legislative Assembly ==
Year	Member	Political party
1962	Taneti Veera Raghavulu	Indian National Congress
1967	Taneti Veera Raghavulu	Indian National Congress
1972	Sali Venkata Rao	Indian National Congress
1978	Desari Sarojini Devi	Indian National Congress
1983	Karupati Vivekananda	Telugu Desam Party
1985	Karupati Vivekananda	Telugu Desam Party
1989	Karupati Vivekananda	Telugu Desam Party
1994	Jonnakuti Babaji Rao	Telugu Desam Party
1999	Jonnakuti Babaji Rao	Telugu Desam Party
2004	Maddala Suneeta	Indian National Congress
2009	Taneti Vanitha	Telugu Desam Party
2014	Muppidi Venkateswara Rao	Telugu Desam Party
2019	Talari Venkat Rao	YSR Congress Party
2024	Maddipati Venkata Raju	Telugu Desam Party

== Election results ==
=== 2004 ===
2004 Andhra Pradesh Legislative Assembly election: Gopalapuram
Party	Candidate	Votes	%	±%
INC	Maddala Suneeta	67,500	52.99	+5.34
TDP	Abbulu Koppaka	59,878	47.01	−3.25
Majority		7,622	5.98	
Turnout		127,378	76.98	+3.44
INC gain from TDP		Swing		

=== 2009 ===
2009 Andhra Pradesh Legislative Assembly election: Gopalapuram
Party	Candidate	Votes	%	±%
TDP	Taneti Vanitha	70,659	43.26	+3.75
INC	Usha Tigiripalli	56,006	34.29	−18.70
PRP	Kadalaiah Sabbiti	30,158	18.46	
Majority		14,653	8.97	
Turnout		163,337	85.76	+8.78
TDP gain from INC		Swing		

=== 2014 ===
2014 Andhra Pradesh Legislative Assembly election: Gopalapuram
Party	Candidate	Votes	%	±%
TDP	Muppidi Venkateswara Rao	95,299	51.14	
YSRCP	Talari Venkat Rao	83,759	40.62	
Majority		11,540	10.52	
Turnout		186,343	86.91	+1.15
TDP hold		Swing		

=== 2019 ===
2019 Andhra Pradesh Legislative Assembly election: Gopalapuram
Party	Candidate	Votes	%	±%
YSRCP	Talari Venkat Rao	111,785	56.04	
TDP	Muppidi Venkateswara Rao	74,324	37.26	
BSP	Sirra Bharatha Rao	5,882	2.95	
Majority		37,461	18.78	
Turnout		1,99,464		
YSRCP hold		Swing		

=== 2024 ===
2024 Andhra Pradesh Legislative Assembly election: Gopalapuram
Party	Candidate	Votes	%	±%
TDP	Maddipati Venkata Raju	1,14,420	54.06	+3.59
YSRCP	Taneti Vanitha	87,636	41.4	−0.68
NOTA	None Of The Above	4,500	2.13	+0.00
	Various	1,681	0.80	+1.28
Majority		26,784	12.66	
Turnout		2,08,237	98.38	+0.61
TDP gain from YSRCP		Swing		

== See also ==
- List of constituencies of Andhra Pradesh Legislative Assembly
