= Nidadavole Assembly constituency =

Constituency of the Andhra Pradesh Legislative Assembly, India

Coordinates: 16.89°N 81.66°E

Nidadavole
- Constituency No. 55 for the Andhra Pradesh Legislative Assembly
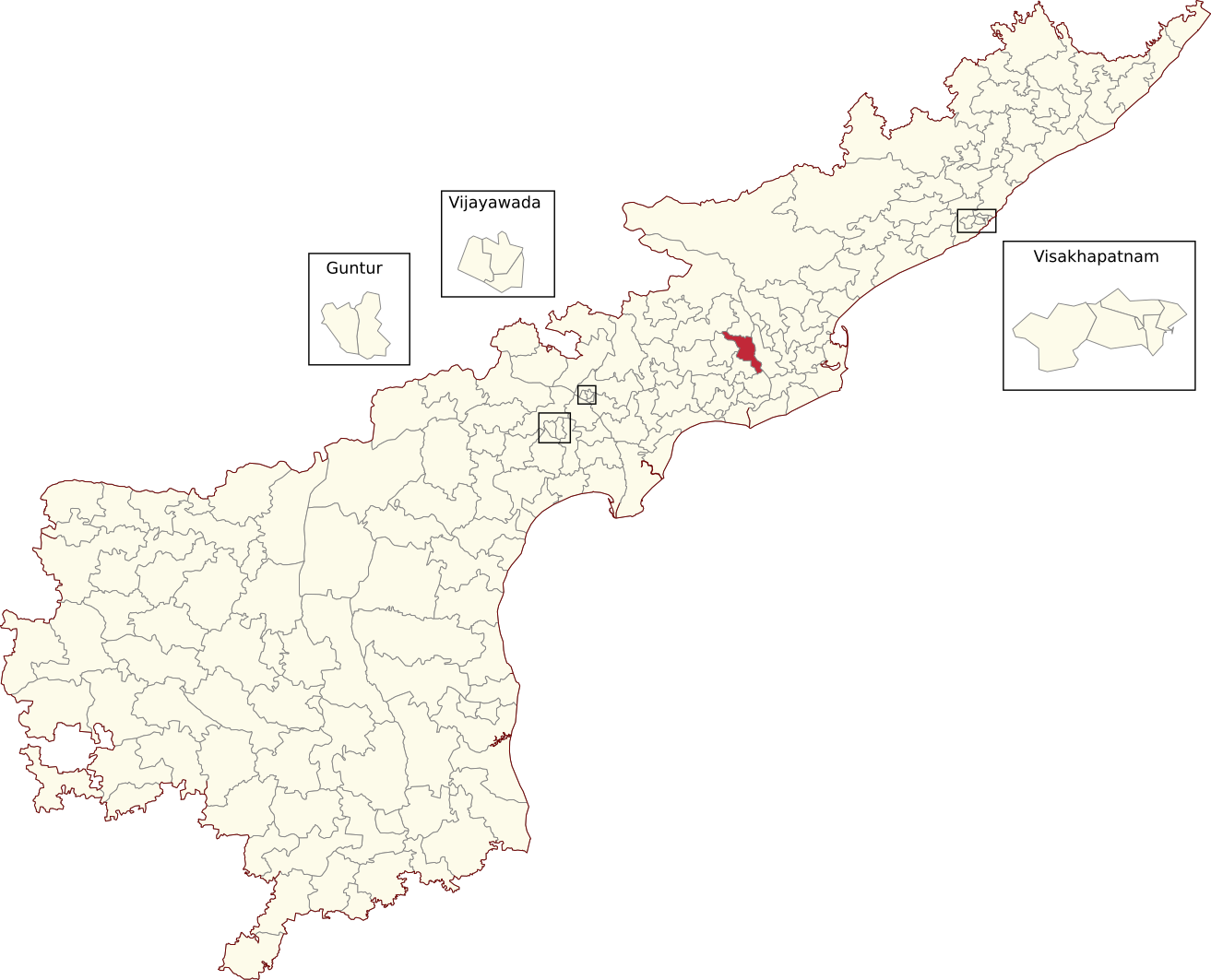
- Location of Nidadavole Assembly constituency within Andhra Pradesh

Constituency details
- Country: India
- Region: South India
- State: Andhra Pradesh
- District: East Godavari
- Lok Sabha constituency: Rajahmundry
- Established: 2008
- Total electors: 203,084
- Reservation: None

Member of Legislative Assembly
- 16th Andhra Pradesh Legislative Assembly
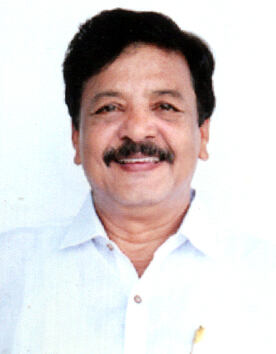
- Incumbent Kandula Durgesh
- Party: JSP
- Alliance: NDA
- Elected year: 2024

Nidadavole Assembly constituency is a constituency in East Godavari district of Andhra Pradesh that elects representatives to the Andhra Pradesh Legislative Assembly in India. It is one of the seven assembly segments of Rajahmundry Lok Sabha constituency.

Kandula Durgesh is the current MLA of the constituency, having won the 2024 Andhra Pradesh Legislative Assembly election from Janasena Party. As of 2024, there are a total of 203,084 electors in the constituency. The constituency was established in 2008, as per the Delimitation Orders (2008).

== Mandals ==
The three mandals that form the assembly constituency are:

Mandal
Nidadavole
Undrajavaram
Peravali

== Members of the Legislative Assembly ==
Year	Member	Political party
2009	Burugupalli Sesharao	Telugu Desam Party
2014	Burugupalli Sesharao	Telugu Desam Party
2019	Geddam Srinivas Naidu	YSR Congress Party
2024	Kandula Durgesh	Janasena Party

== Election results ==
=== 2024 ===
2024 Andhra Pradesh Legislative Assembly election: Nidadavole
Party	Candidate	Votes	%	±%
JSP	Kandula Durgesh	102,699	56.27	
YSRCP	Geddam Srinivas Naidu	69,395	38.03	
NOTA	None of the Above	2,137	1.17	
AIFB	Kasturi Satya Prasad	1,691	0.93	
Majority		33,304	18.25	
Turnout		182,496	85.45	
JSP gain from YSRCP		Swing		

=== 2019 ===
2019 Andhra Pradesh Legislative Assembly election: Nidadavole
Party	Candidate	Votes	%	±%
YSRCP	Geddam Srinivas Naidu	81,001	48.19	▲2.15
TDP	Burugupalli Sesharao	59,313	35.29	▼14.64
JSP	Atikala Naga Ramya Sri	23,073	13.73	
NOTA	None of the Above	1,693	1.01	▲0.46
BJP	Lingampalli Venkateswararao	1,012	0.60	
INC	Peddireddy Subbarao	954	0.57	▼0.33
Majority		21,688	12.90	
Turnout		168,096	82.71	
YSRCP gain from TDP		Swing		

=== 2014 ===
2014 Andhra Pradesh Legislative Assembly election: Nidadavole
Party	Candidate	Votes	%	±%
TDP	Burugupalli Sesharao	81,591	49.93	▲15.79
YSRCP	S. Rajiv Krishna	75,232	46.04	
INC	Kamisetty Venkata Satyanarayana	1,469	0.90	▼29.43
BSP	Gummappu Chitrasenu	1,248	0.76	▼1.11
LSP	Jeedigunta Krishna	903	0.55	▼0.57
NOTA	None of the Above	893	0.55	
Majority		6,359	3.89	
Turnout		163,398	85.63	
TDP hold		Swing		

=== 2009 ===
2009 Andhra Pradesh Legislative Assembly election: Nidadavole
Party	Candidate	Votes	%	±%
TDP	Burugupalli Sesharao	51,680	34.14	
INC	Geddam Srinivas Naidu	45,914	30.33	
PRP	Rudraraju Gajapathi Kumar Raju	44,511	29.40	
BSP	Nakka Venkateswarlu	2,832	1.87	
LSP	Bandi Satyanarayana	1,691	1.12	
Majority		5,766	3.81	
Turnout		151,382		
TDP win (new seat)				

== See also ==
- List of constituencies of the Andhra Pradesh Legislative Assembly
