= Nalla Reddi Naidu =

Indian politician

Member of Parliament
- Constituency: Rajahmundry

Personal details
- Born: 13 January 1917 Eadarada, East Godavari district, Madras Presidency, British India (present-day Andhra Pradesh, India)
- Died: July 1982 (aged 65)
- Party: Praja Socialist Party
- Spouse: Naga Mani Devi
- Children: 5; 2 sons and 3 daughters

Nalla Reddi Naidu BA, L.L.B. (13 January 1917 – July 1982) was an Indian lawyer and politician. He was a Member of Parliament representing Rajahmundry 1952 to 1957.

== Biography ==
Nalla Reddi Naidu was born on 13 January 1917, in Edarada, East Godavari District, Andhra Pradesh in a Zamindari family. Rao Bahadur Sir Kurma Venkata Reddy Naidu, who was the Governor General of erstwhile Madras State, was his father's cousin. The former served as a motivation for Nalla Reddi Naidu to join politics and social service. The family lived in Nalla Street, Amalapuram.

He graduated in Law from the Pune University and was a junior to P. V. Narasimha Rao, ex-Prime Minister of India at the university. He was very actively involved in India's freedom movement and later in farmer's movement in 1954.

Reddi Naidu contested the Parliament elections in 1952, as a Praja Socialist Party candidate from the Rajahmundry Lok Sabha constituency against Durgabai Deshmukh of Congress Party and won the elections with a large majority and became the first Member of Parliament (MP) Rajahmundry between 1952 and 1957.

Consequently, during his tenure as MP, he had shifted to the Congress Party in 1954. Apart from being the M.P., he also served as Chairman of Amalapuram thrice. Besides politics, he was a leading criminal lawyer. He never lost a single case during his practising period. He died in July 1982 leaving a legacy behind.
