= K. S. Jawahar =

Former Minister of Excise, Andhra Pradesh, India

Chairman of Andhra Pradesh SC Commission
- Incumbent
- Assumed office 11 May 2025

Minister of Excise, Government of Andhra Pradesh
- In office 2 April 2017 – 29 May 2019

Member of the Legislative Assembly, Andhra Pradesh
- In office 16 May 2014 – 23 May 2019
- Chief Minister: N. Chandrababu Naidu
- Preceded by: T V Rama Rao, TDP
- Succeeded by: Taneti Vanitha, YRCP
- Constituency: Kovvur, East Godavari district

Personal details
- Born: Kothapalli Samuel Jawahar; 26 January 1965 (age 61) Ganugapadu, Tiruvuru, Andhra Pradesh, India
- Party: Telugu Desam Party (2014 – present)
- Spouse: Usha Rani
- Children: 3
- Parent(s): Amrutham (father), Dhanamma (mother)
- Occupation: Teacher, politician

Kothapalli Samuel Jawahar (born 26 January 1965), popularly known as K. S. Jawahar, is a politician from the state of Andhra Pradesh and also a teacher. He served as the State Excise Minister from 2017 to 2019 in the state of Andhra Pradesh and was elected as the Member of the Legislative Assembly (MLA) for Kovvur Assembly constituency from 2014 to 2019.

K. S. Jawahar was appointed as AP SC Commission chairman on 11 May 2025.

== Early life ==
K. S. Jawahar completed his BA and B.Ed. degrees, as well as a PGDTT qualification. He worked as a teacher in Kovvur and held the position of President of the Andhra Pradesh Teachers Federation. He became a member of the Telugu Desam Party (TDP) prior to the 2014 elections.

== Political career ==
Jawahar resigned from his position as a teacher entered politics in 2014 through the Telugu Desam Party. He ran as a TDP candidate for the Kovvur constituency in the 2014 elections and emerged victorious, defeating YSR Congress Party candidate Taneti Vanitha with a majority of 12,745 votes. After assuming office as an MLA, Jawahar took on various roles, including serving as a member of the SC House Committee and being appointed as a board member of the Agriculture Committee under N. G. Ranga Agricultural University. On April 2, 2017, he assumed the role of Excise Minister as part of the cabinet reshuffle in Andhra Pradesh. In the 2019 elections, he contested as a TDP candidate for the Tiruvuru Assembly constituency but was defeated by YSR Congress Party candidate Kokkiligadda Rakshana Nidhi by 10,835 votes.
