= Pendyala Venkata Krishna Rao =

Indian politician (1953–2024)

Member of Andhra Pradesh Legislative Assembly
- Incumbent
- Assumed office 1983–1999; 2004–2009
- Constituency: Kovvur

Personal details
- Born: 31 May 1953 Dommeru, West Godavari district, Andhra Pradesh, India
- Died: 21 May 2024 (aged 70) Hyderabad, Telangana, India
- Party: YSR Congress Party (2012–2024)
- Other political affiliations: Telugu Desam Party (1982–2012)
- Spouse: Nagamani
- Children: 3

Pendyala Venkata Krishna Rao (31 January 1953 – 21 May 2024) was an Indian politician from Andhra Pradesh. He was elected as an MLA five times from Kovvur Assembly constituency. He had to step down after the constituency was reserved for Scheduled Caste in 2009. May

== Political career ==
Krishnababu entered politics in 1982 through the Telugu Desam Party at NTR's call. He won as MLA five times in 1983, 1985, 1989, 1994 and 2004 assembly elections from Kovvur. Although he was defeated in 1999, he continued his long political career as an MLA for almost 23 years. During the 2009 delimitation of constituencies, Krishnababu could not contest Kovvuru as it was reserved for SC. He joined YSRCP in 2012. He was limited to campaigning in 2014 and 2019 elections. He continued to be a member of the YSRCP Central Governing Council.

== Personal life and death ==
Pendyala Venkata Krishna Rao had two sons, Venkatarayudu and Ravibabu, along with a daughter, Archana sennar and grandchildren Arjun Sennar. After suffering from a long illness, he died at a private hospital in Hyderabad, on 21 May 2024, at the age of 71.
