= Kaneti Mohan Rao =

Indian politician (1917–2014)

Member of Parliament, Lok Sabha
- In office 1953–1957
- Constituency: Rajahmundry

Personal details
- Born: 1917 13 June 2014 (aged 96–97)
- Party: Communist Party of India

Kaneti Mohan Rao (c. 1917 – 13 June 2014) was an Indian politician, freedom activist and a former member of parliament who represented Rajahmundry parliamentary constituency in the 1st Lok Sabha. He was affiliated with Communist Party of India and contested India's first general election from his constituency.

He was born in East Godavari district, Andhra Pradesh. After Rao was declared winner, he celebrated his victory by moving across the city on his cycle. He also used to travel by cycle from parliament to his residence in New Delhi. When he was elected to first Lok Sabha at the age of 27, he was the youngest parliament member. He received INR1,400 pension under the oldest pension scheme until the then prime minister Manmohan Singh and president Pratibha Patil increase this to INR20,000 in 2009.

He died on 13 June at government general hospital in Kakinada.
