= Payakaraopet Assembly constituency =

Constituency of the Andhra Pradesh Legislative Assembly, India

Coordinates: 17.36°N 82.55°E

Payakaraopet
- Constituency No. 33 for the Andhra Pradesh Legislative Assembly
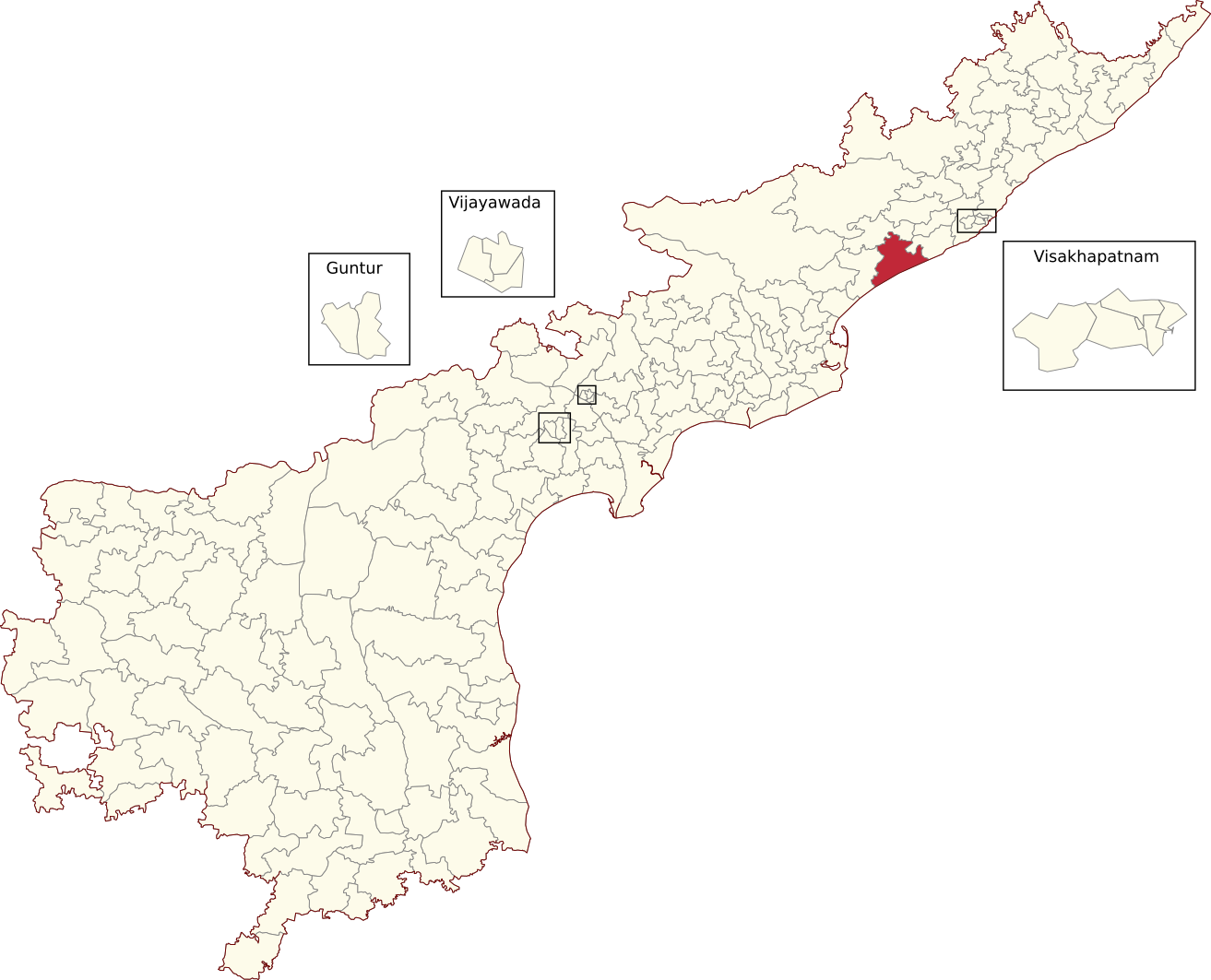
- Location of Payakaraopet Assembly constituency within Andhra Pradesh

Constituency details
- Country: India
- Region: South India
- State: Andhra Pradesh
- District: Anakapalli
- Lok Sabha constituency: Anakapalli
- Established: 1951
- Total electors: 240,285
- Reservation: SC

Member of Legislative Assembly
- 16th Andhra Pradesh Legislative Assembly
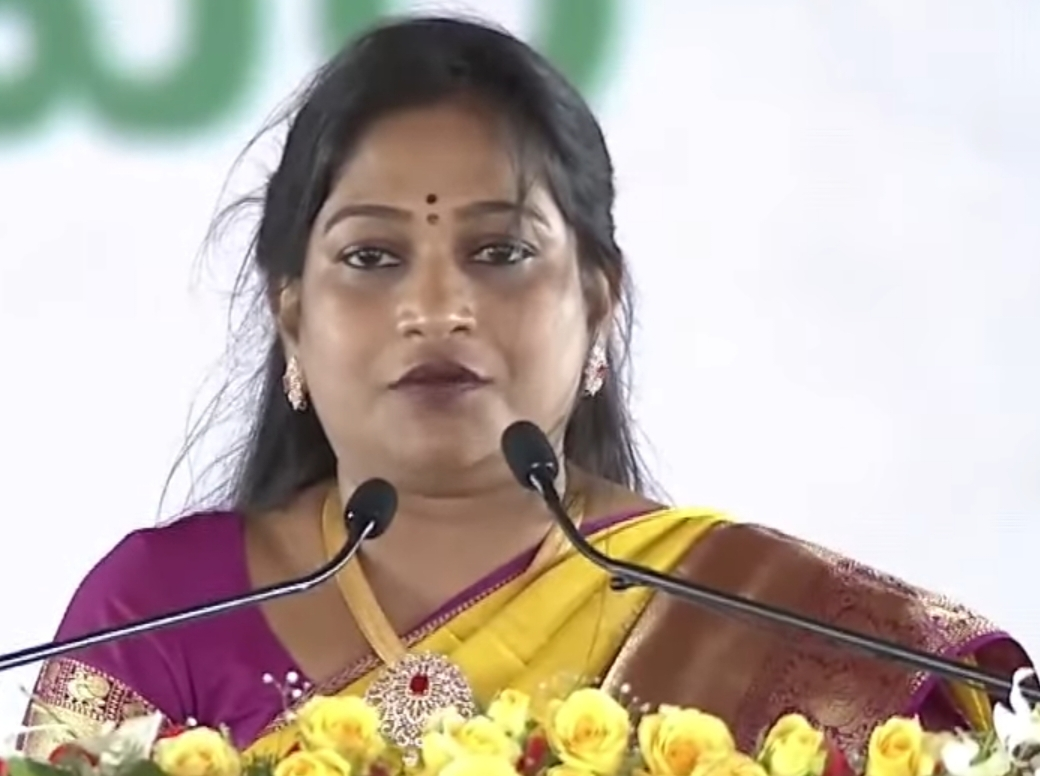
- Incumbent Vangalapudi Anitha
- Party: TDP
- Alliance: NDA
- Elected year: 2024

Payakaraopet is a Scheduled Caste reserved constituency in Anakapalli district of Andhra Pradesh that elects representatives to the Andhra Pradesh Legislative Assembly in India. It is one of the seven assembly segments of Anakapalli Lok Sabha constituency.

Vangalapudi Anitha is the current MLA of the constituency, having won the 2024 Andhra Pradesh Legislative Assembly election from Telugu Desam Party. As of 2019, there are a total of 240,285 electors in the constituency. The constituency was established in 1951, as per the Delimitation Orders (1951).

== Mandals ==
The four mandals that form the assembly constituency are:

Mandal
Kotauratla
Nakkapalli
Payakaraopeta
S.Rayavaram

Mandals in Payakaraopet Assembly Constituency

== Members of the Legislative Assembly ==
Year	Member	Political party
1952	Raja Sagi Suryanarayana Raju	Independent
1962	Mande Pitchaiah	Communist Party of India
1967	Gantlana Suryanarayana	Indian National Congress
1972	Gantlana Suryanarayana	Indian National Congress
1978	Maruthi Adeyya	Indian National Congress
1983	Sumana Gantela	Telugu Desam Party
1985	Kakara Nookaraju	Telugu Desam Party
1989	Kakara Nookaraju	Telugu Desam Party
1994	Kakara Nookaraju	Telugu Desam Party
1999	Chengala Venkatarao	Telugu Desam Party
2004	Chengala Venkatarao	Telugu Desam Party
2009	Golla Baburao	Indian National Congress
2012	Golla Baburao	YSR Congress Party
2014	Vangalapudi Anitha	Telugu Desam Party
2019	Golla Baburao	YSR Congress Party
2024	Vangalapudi Anitha	Telugu Desam Party

== Election results ==
=== 2024 ===
2024 Andhra Pradesh Legislative Assembly election: Payakaraopet
Party	Candidate	Votes	%	±%
TDP	Vangalapudi Anitha	120,042	57.86	
YSRCP	Kambala Jogulu	76,315	36.78	
INC	Dr. Boni Tata Rao	2,087	1.01	
NOTA	None of the above	4,107	1.98	
Majority		43,727	21.08	
Turnout		2,07,486		
TDP gain from YSRCP		Swing		

=== 2019 ===
2019 Andhra Pradesh Legislative Assembly election: Payakaraopet
Party	Candidate	Votes	%	±%
YSRCP	Golla Baburao	98,745	50.45%	
TDP	B. Bangarayya	67,556	34.52%	
JSP	Nakka Raja Babu	15,921	8.13%	
Majority		31,189	15.93%	
Turnout		1,95,725	81.45%	
YSRCP gain from TDP		Swing		

=== 2014 ===
2014 Andhra Pradesh Legislative Assembly election: Payakaraopet
Party	Candidate	Votes	%	±%
TDP	Vangalapudi Anitha	86,355	48.02	
YSRCP	Changala Venkata Rao	83,527	46.44	
Majority		2,828	1.58	
Turnout		179,843	80.69	+5.80
TDP gain from INC		Swing		

=== 2009 ===
2009 Andhra Pradesh Legislative Assembly election: Payakaraopet
Party	Candidate	Votes	%	±%
INC	Golla Baburao	50,698	32.11	+6.44
TDP	Chengala Venkata Rao	50,042	31.69	−11.46
PRP	Gurindapalli Dhanaraju	49,264	31.20	
Majority		656	0.42	
Turnout		157,890	74.89	+4.08
INC gain from TDP		Swing		

=== 2004 ===
2004 Andhra Pradesh Legislative Assembly election: Payakaraopet
Party	Candidate	Votes	%	±%
TDP	Changala Venkata Rao	40,794	43.15	−8.73
Independent	Sumana Gantela	27,105	28.67	
INC	Vijaya Kumari Ambati	24,171	25.57	−17.85
Majority		13,689	14.48	
Turnout		94,544	70.81	+5.44
TDP hold		Swing		

=== 1999 ===
1999 Andhra Pradesh Legislative Assembly election: Payakaraopet
Party	Candidate	Votes	%	±%
TDP	Chengala Venkatarao	46,478	51.9	▲2.3
INC	Gantela Sumana	38,902	43.4	▼1.2
Anna Telugu Desam Party	Kakara Nookaraju	2,935	3.3	
Marxist Communist Party Of India (S.S.SRIVASTAVA)	Bhupathi Apparao	928	1.0	
Independent	Godugu Raju	342	0.4	
Majority		7,576	8.2	▲3.3
Turnout		92,556	67.5	▲1.4
TDP hold		Swing		

=== 1994 ===
1994 Andhra Pradesh Legislative Assembly election: Payakaraopet
Party	Candidate	Votes	%	±%
TDP	Kakara Nookaraju	39,666	49.6	▼1.9
INC	Gantela Sumana	35,657	44.6	▼2.5
BJP	Beera Nagabhushanam	2,401	3.0	
BSP	Kolaventi Sundararao	1,381	1.7	
Independent	Kakara Soorayamma	490	0.6	
Jharkhand Party	Matia Sudhakararao	308	0.4	
Majority		4,009	4.9	▲0.7
Turnout		82,262	66.1	▼1.6
TDP hold		Swing		

=== 1989 ===
1989 Andhra Pradesh Legislative Assembly election: Payakaraopet
Party	Candidate	Votes	%	±%
TDP	Kakara Nookaraju	38,764	51.5	▼23.1
INC	Gautala Sumaua	35,486	47.1	▲24.3
Independent	Geddam Kumar	1,068	1.4	▼21.4
Majority		3,278	4.2	▼46.5
Turnout		78,855	67.7	▲8.5
TDP hold		Swing		

=== 1985 ===
1985 Andhra Pradesh Legislative Assembly election: Payakaraopet
Party	Candidate	Votes	%	±%
TDP	Kakara Nookaraju	42,821	74.6	▲13.7
INC	G. V. Harsha Kumar	13,053	22.8	▲4.4
Independent	Beera Nagabhushanam	654	1.1	
Independent	Cherukuri Musalayya	450	0.8	
Independent	Matha Polayya	402	0.7	
Majority		29,768	50.7	▲9.3
Turnout		58,752	59.2	▼0.6
TDP hold		Swing		

=== 1983 ===
1983 Andhra Pradesh Legislative Assembly election: Payakaraopet
Party	Candidate	Votes	%	±%
TDP	Sumana Gantela	34,030	60.9	
INC	Nelaparthi Ramarao	10,252	18.4	▼1.2
Independent	Gara Raju	7,746	13.9	▼14
BJP	Nadupuri Sanyasirao	3,076	5.5	
INC(J)	Adayya Maruthi	764	1.4	
Majority		23,778	41.4	▲11.7
Turnout		57,422	59.8	▲0.4
TDP gain from INC(I)		Swing		

=== 1978 ===
1978 Andhra Pradesh Legislative Assembly election: Payakaraopet
Party	Candidate	Votes	%	±%
INC(I)	Maruthi Adeyya	29,490	58.7	
INC	Gara China Nookaraju	14,023	27.9	▼43.94
JP	Gantala Suryanarayana	5,543	11.0	▼60.84
Independent	Beera Nagabhushanam	1,215	2.4	▼9.41
Majority		15,467	29.7	▼30.33
Turnout		52,053	59.4	▲21
INC(I) gain from INC		Swing		

=== 1972 ===
1972 Andhra Pradesh Legislative Assembly election: Payakaraopet
Party	Candidate	Votes	%	±%
INC	Gantlana Suryanarayana	21,844	71.84	▲36.56
Independent	Beera Nagabhushanam	3,592	11.81	▼19.28
Independent	Boda Suryanarayana	3,563	11.72	
Independent	J.C. Guruvullu	1,407	4.63	▼9.41
Majority		18,252	60.03	▲55.84
Turnout		30,406	38.40	▼18.01
INC hold		Swing		

=== 1967 ===
1967 Andhra Pradesh Legislative Assembly election: Payakaraopet
Party	Candidate	Votes	%	±%
INC	Gantlana Suryanarayana	13,804	35.28	▼10.56
SWA	B. Nagabhushanan	12,165	31.09	
CPI(M)	B. Narasimhulu	7,687	19.65	
RPI	N. Satyam	2,941	7.52	
Independent	G. Nookaraji	2,528	6.46	
Majority		1,639	4.19	▼4.12
Turnout		39,125	56.41	
INC gain from CPI		Swing		

=== 1962 ===
1962 Andhra Pradesh Legislative Assembly election: Payakaraopet
Party	Candidate	Votes	%	±%
CPI	Mande Pitchaiah	13,450	54.15	
INC	Muthyala Pothuraju	11,386	45.84	
Majority		2,064	8.31	▼4.4
Turnout		24,836		
CPI gain from Independent		Swing		

=== 1952 ===
1952 Madras State Legislative Assembly election: Payakaraopeta
Party	Candidate	Votes	%	±%
Independent	Raja Sagi Suryanarayana Raju	9,757	30.78%	
INC	Sunkari Appala Naiudu	5,730	18.08%	18.08%
KMPP	Raparti Jagannatha Rao	5,723	18.06%	
Socialist Party (India)	Katha Radhakrihnamurthy	5,462	17.23%	
Independent	Mohammed Galab	2,548	8.04%	
Independent	Kasturi Subha Rao	1,265	3.99%	
Independent	M. Madhuramruta Rao	1,210	3.82%	
Margin of victory		4,027	12.71%	
Turnout		31,695	50.19%	
Registered electors		63,155		
Independent win (new seat)				

== See also ==
- List of constituencies of the Andhra Pradesh Legislative Assembly
