= Vangalapudi Anitha =

Indian politician (born 1979)

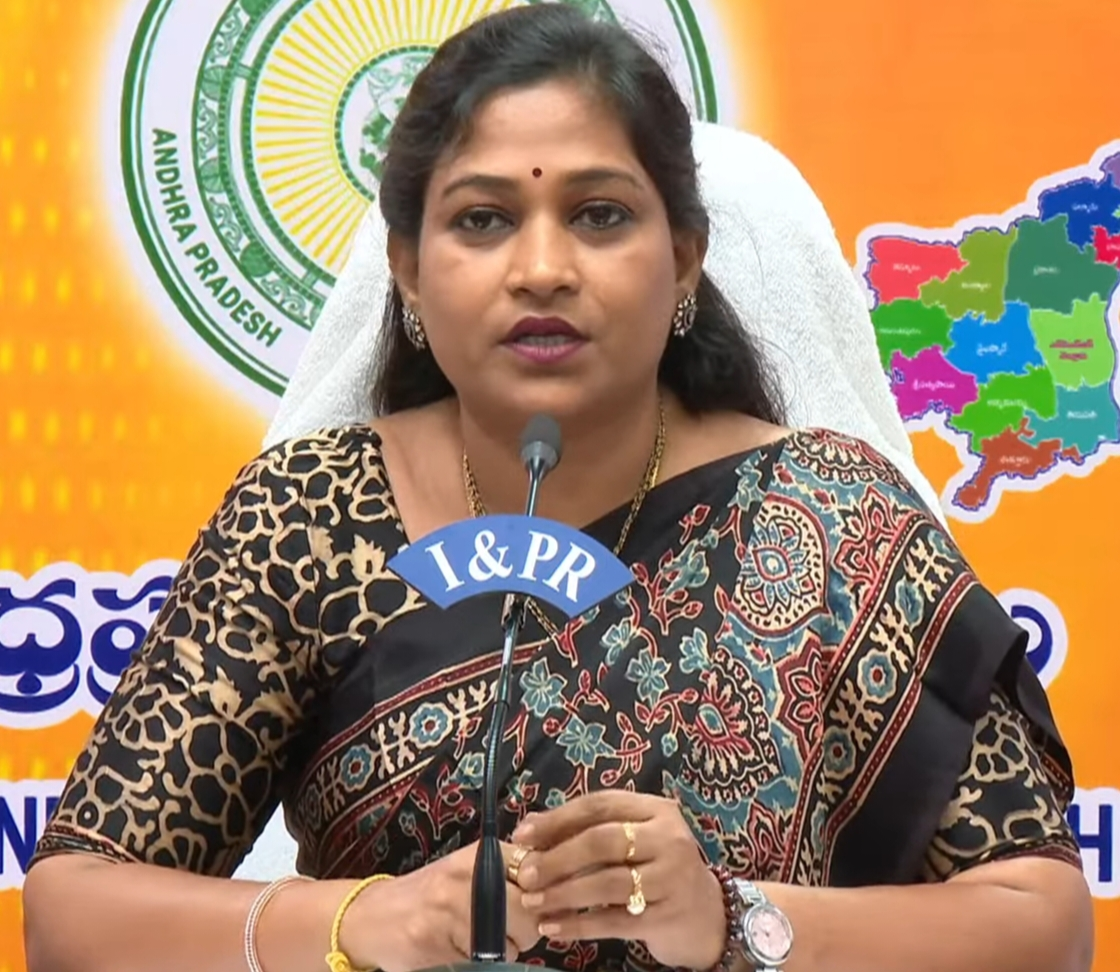

Minister of Home Affairs and Disaster Management Government of Andhra Pradesh
- Incumbent
- Assumed office 12 June 2024
- Governor: S. Abdul Nazeer
- Chief Minister: N. Chandrababu Naidu
- Preceded by: Taneti Vanitha

Member of Andhra Pradesh Legislative Assembly
- Incumbent
- Assumed office 2024
- Preceded by: Golla Baburao
- Constituency: Payakaraopet
- In office 2014–2019
- Preceded by: Golla Babu Rao
- Succeeded by: Golla Babu Rao
- Constituency: Payakaraopet

Personal details
- Born: 24 March 1979 (age 47)
- Party: Telugu Desam Party
- Spouse: Kosara Siva Prasad
- Children: Kosara Nikhil, Kosara Reshmitha Sree
- Parent: Vangalapudi Apparao (father)

Vangalapudi Anitha (born 24 March 1979) is an Indian politician from Andhra Pradesh currently serving as the Minister of Home Affairs and Disaster Management in the Government of Andhra Pradesh.

She became an MLA for the second time, winning the 2024 Andhra Pradesh Legislative Assembly election on Telugu Desam Party ticket from Payakaraopet SC reserved constituency in the erstwhile Visakhapatnam district and present Anakapalli district.

== Early life and education ==
Anitha was born in Lingarajupalem, S. Rayavaram mandal, Visakhapatnam district. Her father's name is Vangalapudi Apparao. She completed her MA and M.Ed. from Andhra University in 2009. She left teaching to enter politics. She married K Shiva Prasad. They have a daughter, Rashmita.

== Career ==
Anitha won as an MLA for the first time in 2014. She won the 2014 Andhra Pradesh Legislative Assembly election from Payakaraopet Assembly constituency representing Telugu Desam Party. She defeated her nearest rival Chengala Venkatrao of YSRCP by 2,828 votes. In April 2018, she was nominated as a member of the Tirupati Thirumala Devasthanam board. But after a controversy in social media, within a few days she requested the chief minister and withdrew the membership. Later, it was cancelled. . On 30 January 2021, she became the president of Telugu Mahila, the women's wing of TDP. She regained the Payakaraopet seat in the 2024 Andhra Pradesh Legislative Assembly election.
