= Kandula Durgesh =

Indian politician

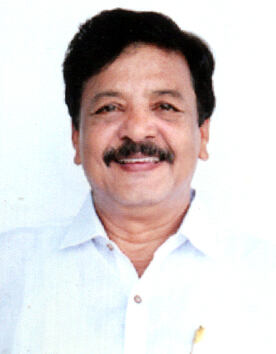

Minister for Tourism and Culture Government of Andhra Pradesh
- Incumbent
- Assumed office 12 June 2024
- Governor: S. Abdul Nazeer
- Chief Minister: N. Chandrababu Naidu
- Preceded by: R. K. Roja

Minister for Cinematography Government of Andhra Pradesh
- Incumbent
- Assumed office 12 June 2024
- Governor: S. Abdul Nazeer
- Chief Minister: N. Chandrababu Naidu
- Preceded by: Chelluboyina Venugopala Krishna

Member of Legislative Assembly Andhra Pradesh
- Incumbent
- Assumed office 4 June 2024
- Preceded by: Geddam Srinivas Naidu
- Constituency: Nidadavole

Member of Legislative Council Andhra Pradesh
- In office 30 March 2007 – 29 March 2013
- Chairman: A. Chakrapani
- Deputy: Mohammed Jani
- Leader of the House: Y. S. Rajasekhara Reddy; Konijeti Rosaiah; Kiran Kumar Reddy
- Constituency: Elected by MLAs

Personal details
- Born: 17 September 1962 (age 63) Rajahmundry, Andhra Pradesh, India
- Party: Janasena Party (2018-present)
- Other political affiliations: Indian National Congress (2007-2016); YSR Congress Party (2016-2018)
- Spouse: Smt UshaRani
- Children: 2 (daughter & son)
- Education: M.A (economics) from Andhra University

Kandula Lakshmi Durgesh Prasad, better known as Kandula Durgesh, is an Indian Politician. He was a member of Andhra Pradesh Legislative Council for a term from 2007-2013 representing Indian National Congress. He also contested the 2019 assembly election (2019 Andhra Pradesh Legislative Assembly election), in Rajahmundry Rural (Assembly constituency) representing Jana Sena Party defeated in the election polling but secured 42,685 votes in his favour. He is a cabinet minister in the Government of Andhra Pradesh after being elected from Nidadavole in 2024 Assembly elections.
