= Kotauratla =

- Village
- Interactive map of Kotauratla
- Location in Andhra Pradesh, India
- Coordinates: 17.35°N 82.41°E
- Country: India
- State: Andhra Pradesh
- District: Anakapalli

Government
  - Body: Major Panchayati (Local Government)
  - MLA: GOLLA BABURAO (payakaraopeta Constituency)

Area
  - Total: 80 km^{2} (31 sq mi)
- Elevation: 30 m (98 ft)

Population
  - Total: 30,000
  - Density: 160/km^{2} (410/sq mi)

Languages
  - Official: Telugu
- Time zone: UTC+5:30 (IST)
- PIN: 531085
- Telephone code: 08932, airtel, hutch, tata are already in use and recently idea and bsnl networks have been started
- Vehicle Registration: AP31 (Former); AP39 (from 30 January 2019)

Kotauratla is a village in Anakapalli district in the state of Andhra Pradesh in India.

== Geography ==
Kota Uratla is located at 17.35N 82.41E. It has an average elevation of 30 meters (101 feet). There is a river flowing through this village named Varaha.
