= Geddam Srinivas Naidu =

Indian politician

Geddam Srinivas Naidu (born 1969) is an Indian politician from Andhra Pradesh. He is an MLA of YSR Congress Party from Nidadavolu Assembly constituency in West Godavari district. Representing YSRCP, he lost the Nidadavolu seat in the 2024 Assembly election.

== Early life and education ==
Naidu is from Nidadavolu and his father's name is Suryachandra Rao. He graduated from the National Institute of Engineering, University of Mysore. Later, he completed his Master of Business Administration at Marshall University, in the United States in 1992. He runs his own business.

== Career ==
Naidu started his political career with the Indian National Congress in 2009. He contested the Nidadavolu seat in the 2009 Andhra Pradesh Legislative Assembly election on Congress ticket but lost to Burugupalli Sesharao of the Telugu Desam Party by a margin of 57,66 votes. Later he shifted to YSRCP, and won from Nidadavolu Assembly constituency in the 2019 Andhra Pradesh Legislative Assembly election representing YSR Congress Party. He polled 81,001 votes and defeated his nearest rival Burugupalli Sesharao of Telugu Desam Party by a margin of 21,688 votes. He lost the 2024 Andhra Pradesh Legislative Assembly election to JSP candidate Kandula Durgesh who polled 102,699 votes. Naidu could only poll 69,395 votes and lost by a margin of 33,304 votes.
