= Kapileswarapuram, East Godavari district =

Kapileswarapuram
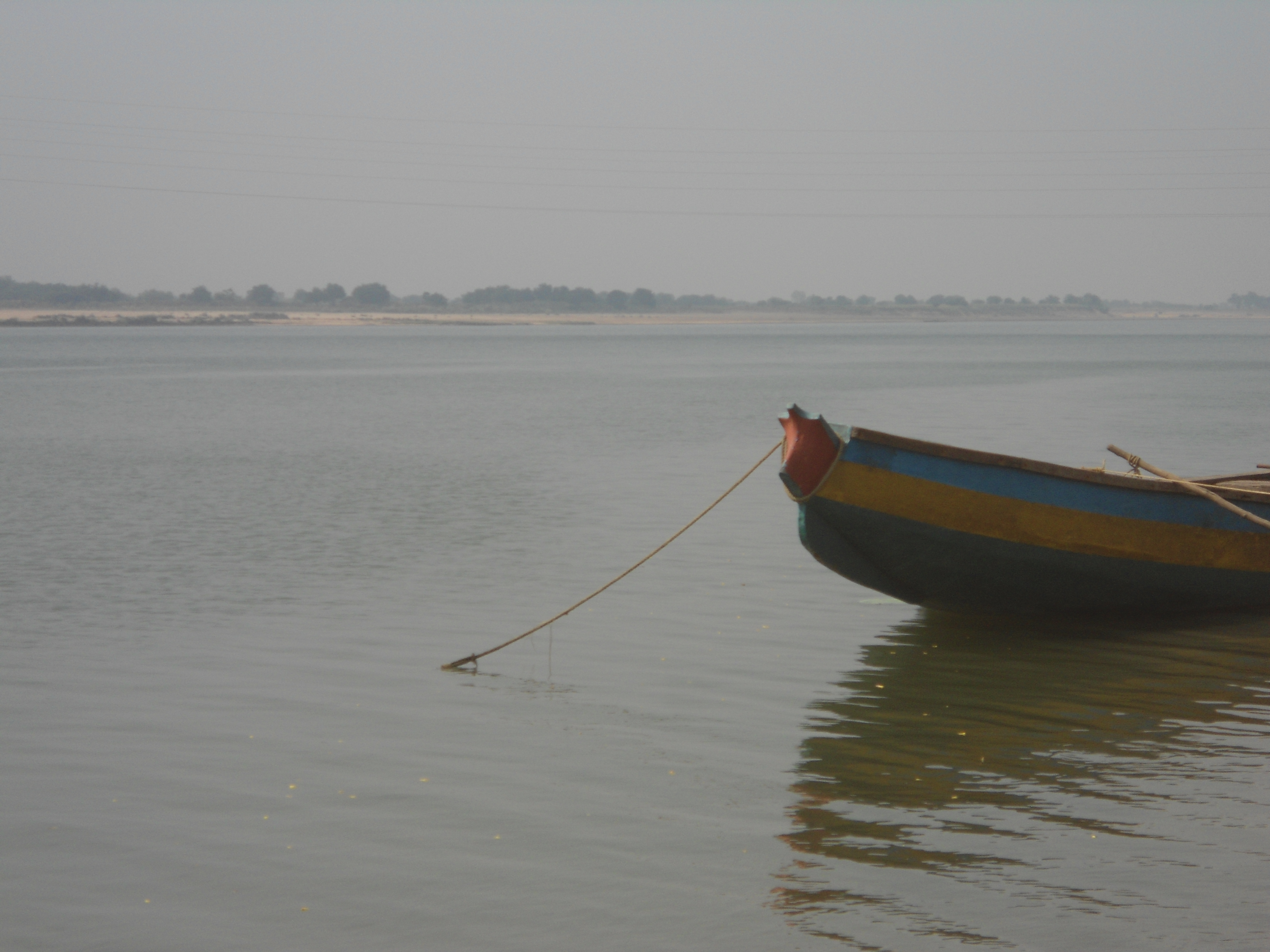
- Boat in river Godavari at Kapileswarapuram
- Interactive map of Kapileswarapuram
- Coordinates: 16.74°N 81.92°E
- Country: India
- State: Andhra Pradesh
- District: East Godavari
- Talukas: Kapileswarapuram

Population
  - Total: 16,000

Languages
  - Official: Telugu
- Time zone: UTC+5:30 (IST)
- PIN: 533309

Kapileswarapuram is a village in the Mandal of the same name in East Godavari district in the state of Andhra Pradesh in India.

== Geography ==
The Godavari River flows through the village. The Zamindari Board Middle School was founded in 1918, later changed to a High School and renamed after the Zamindar Sri Balusu Buchi Sarva rayudu garu.
