= Talari Venkat Rao =

Indian politician

Talari Venkat Rao (born 24 August 1968) is an Indian politician from Andhra Pradesh. He won the 2019 Andhra Pradesh Legislative Assembly Election on YSR Congress Party ticket from Gopalapuram SC reserved constituency in West Godavari district. He defeated Muppidi Venkateswara Rao by a margin of TDP by 37,461 votes. YSRCP nominated him to contest the 2024 Assembly election from Kovvur constituency which is reserved for members of SC community.

== Early life and education ==
Venkat Rao hails from Devarapalli village, Kovvur division, West Godavari district. His father Yesudas is a farmer and his mother Vijaya Lakshmi is a housewife. He completed his diploma in Electronics and Communications Engineering from Col.D.S.Raju Polytechnic in Poduru, West Godavari, in 1996. He married Paramjyothi and has three daughters. He received a Corona Warrior award from Prime9 News channel in Kakinada in December 2020.

== Career ==
Rao started his political career in 1999 with the Indian National Congress party. He joined YSR Congress party and contested in the 2014 Assembly Elections from Gopalapuram on YSRCP ticket but lost the election to Muppidi Venkateswara Rao of TDP by 11,540 votes. In 2019, he won the Gopalapuram seat on YSRCP ticket.
