= Gopalapuram, East Godavari =

Gopalapuram
- village
- Interactive map of Gopalapuram
- Location in Andhra Pradesh, India Gopalapuram (India)
- Coordinates: 17.10068°N 81.54061°E
- Country: India
- State: Andhra Pradesh
- District: East Godavari

Population (2011)
  - Total: 11,573

Languages
  - Official: Telugu
- Time zone: UTC+5:30 (IST)
- PIN: 534316
- Vehicle registration: AP

Gopala-puram is a village in East Godavari district of the Indian state of Andhra Pradesh. It is the headquarters of Gopalapuram mandal. The nearest train station is kovvuru located at a distance of 28 Km.

== Demographics ==
As of 2011 Census of India, Gopalapuram had a population of 11573. The total population constitute, 5469 males and 6104 females with a sex ratio of 1116 females per 1000 males. 1084 children are in the age group of 0–6 years, with sex ratio of 1061. The average literacy rate is at 74.83%.
