= 2004 Andhra Pradesh Legislative Assembly election =

- 20 April and 26 April 2004

All 294 seats in the Andhra Pradesh Legislative Assembly 148 seats needed for a majority
- Registered: 51,146,498
- Turnout: 35,780,385 (69.96%) ▲0.81%
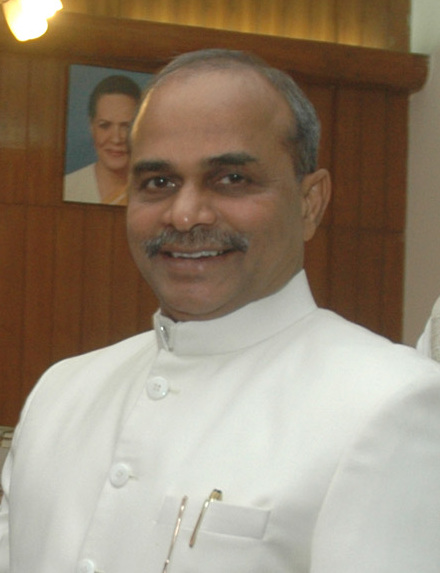

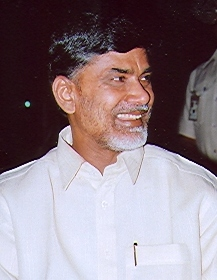

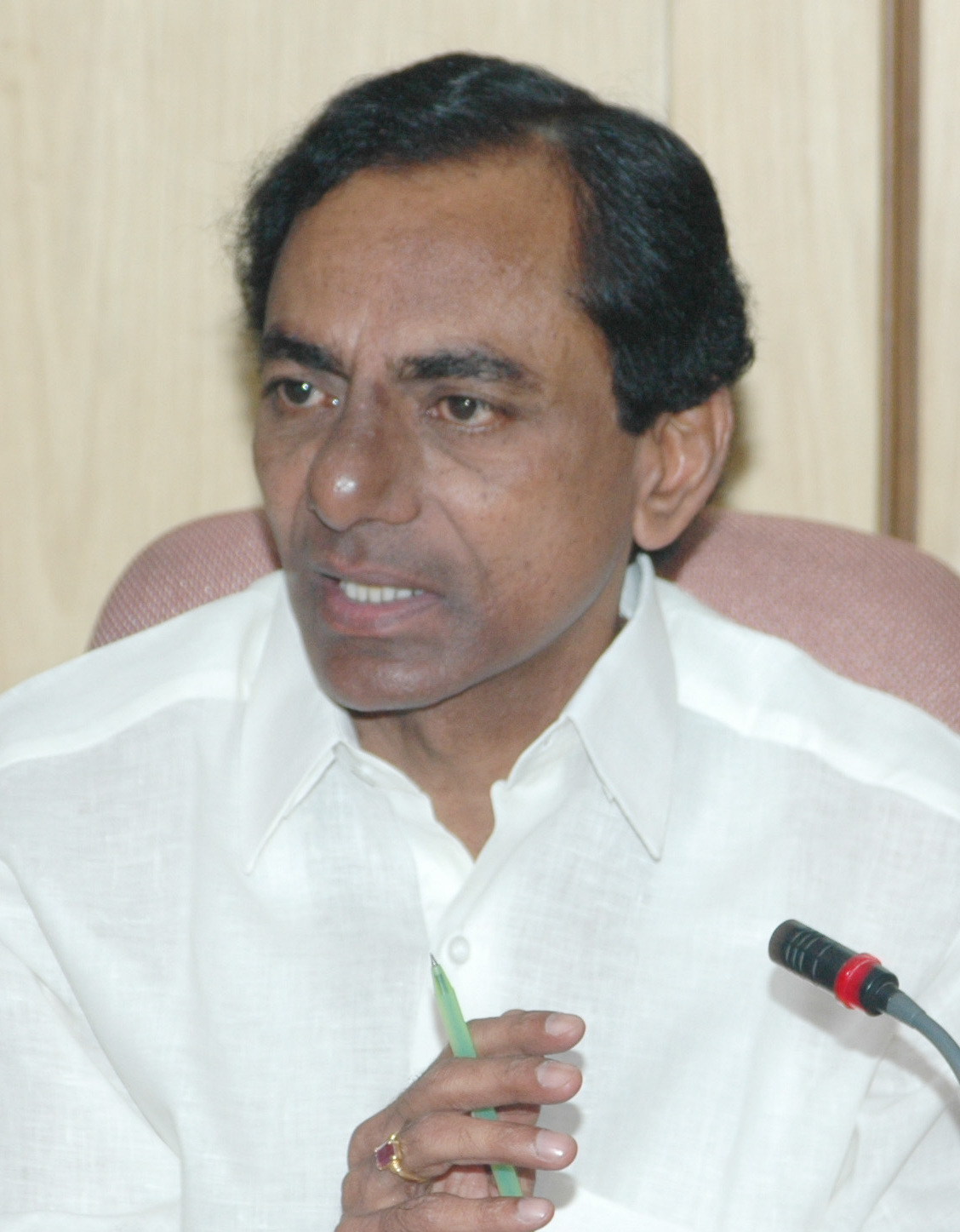
	Majority party	Minority party	Third party
Leader	Y. S. Rajasekhara Reddy	N. Chandrababu Naidu	K. Chandrashekar Rao
Party	INC	TDP	TRS
Alliance	INC+	NDA	INC+
Leader since	1999	1995	2001
Leader's seat	Pulivendula (won)	Kuppam (won)	Siddipet (won; vacated) (Note: Contested and won from the Karimnagar Lok Sabha constituency in the simultaneously conducted 2004 Indian general election in Andhra Pradesh.)
Last election	91 seats, 40.61%	180 seats, 43.87%	Party did not exist
Seats won	185	47	26
Seat change	▲94	▼133	New party
Popular vote	13,793,461	13,444,168	2,390,940
Percentage	38.56%	37.59%	6.68%
Swing	▼2.05%	▼6.28%	New party
- 2004 Andhra Pradesh Legislative Assembly election results

Chief minister before election
N. Chandrababu Naidu
TDP
Chief Minister after election
Y. S. Rajasekhara Reddy
INC

The 2004 Andhra Pradesh Legislative Assembly election was held in April 2004 to elect members of the Andhra Pradesh Legislative Assembly. The Indian National Congress (INC) won the election, winning 185 of the 294 seats, defeating the incumbent Telugu Desam Party (TDP). Following the election, Y. S. Rajasekhara Reddy was sworn in as the Chief Minister of Andhra Pradesh.

== Previous assembly ==
On the recommendation of the Chief Minister N. Chandrababu Naidu, Governor Surjit Singh Barnala dissolved the 11th Andhra Pradesh Legislative Assembly on 14 November 2003, to facilitate early elections and seek a fresh mandate. The tenure of the Assembly was originally scheduled to end on 9 November 2004. The state was being governed by the National Democratic Alliance (NDA) led by the TDP in alliance with the Bharatiya Janata Party (BJP), with N. Chandrababu Naidu serving as Chief Minister since 1995. The tenure of the incumbent government saw a focus on economic development and IT sector growth, while the Telangana region witnessed strong regional sentiment and growing demands for a separate state, which led to the formation of the Telangana Rashtra Samithi (TRS) in 2001.

== Background ==
The election marked the first time in the history of Andhra Pradesh that the INC entered into a pre-poll alliance with a regional party. The INC led a coalition with the TRS, the Communist Party of India (CPI) and the Communist Party of India (Marxist) (CPI-M) to challenge the incumbent NDA government.

The INC-led alliance performed well in the election, with INC, TRS, CPI and CPI(M) collectively securing 226 seats in the legislative assembly. As leader of the INC Legislature Party, Y. S. Rajasekhara Reddy was invited by Governor Surjit Singh Barnala to form the government. The government completed its full five year term, with the tenure of the Legislative Assembly due to expire on 30 May 2009. The Election Commission of India (ECI) scheduled the Assembly elections alongside the 2004 Indian general election, with polling in each Assembly constituency conducted in the same phase as the corresponding Parliamentary constituency.

== Schedule ==
The election schedule was announced by the ECI on 29 February 2004.

Poll event	Date	
Poll event	Phase 1	Phase 2
Date of announcement	29 February 2004	
Notification date	24 March 2004	31 March 2004
Last date for filing nomination	31 March 2004	7 April 2004
Scrutiny of nomination	2 April 2004	8 April 2004
Last date for withdrawal of nomination	5 April 2004	10 April 2004
Date of poll	20 April 2004	26 April 2004
Date of counting of votes	11 May 2004	
No. of constituencies	147	147

=== Phases ===
Phase
1 (21 PCs; 147 ACs)				2 (21 PCs; 147 ACs)			
Parliamentary constituency		Assembly constituency		Parliamentary constituency		Assembly constituency	
No.	Name	No.	Name	No.	Name	No.	Name
1	Srikakulam	1	Ichapuram	7	Kakinada	42	Jaggampeta
1	Srikakulam	2	Sompeta	7	Kakinada	43	Peddapuram
1	Srikakulam	3	Tekkali	7	Kakinada	44	Prathipadu (East Godavari)
1	Srikakulam	4	Harischandrapuram	7	Kakinada	45	Tuni
1	Srikakulam	5	Narasannapeta	7	Kakinada	46	Pithapuram
1	Srikakulam	15	Amadalavalasa	7	Kakinada	47	Sampara
1	Srikakulam	16	Srikakulam	7	Kakinada	48	Kakinada
2	Parvathipuram (ST)	6	Patapatnam	8	Rajahmundry	39	Burugupudi
2	Parvathipuram (ST)	7	Kothuru (ST)	8	Rajahmundry	40	Rajahmundry
2	Parvathipuram (ST)	8	Naguru (ST)	8	Rajahmundry	41	Kadiam
2	Parvathipuram (ST)	9	Parvathipuram	8	Rajahmundry	50	Anaparthi
2	Parvathipuram (ST)	10	Salur (ST)	8	Rajahmundry	51	Ramachandrapuram
2	Parvathipuram (ST)	13	Vunukuru	8	Rajahmundry	52	Alamuru
2	Parvathipuram (ST)	14	Palakonda (SC)	8	Rajahmundry	72	Kovvur
3	Bobbili	11	Bobbili	9	Amalapuram (SC)	49	Tallarevu
3	Bobbili	12	Therlam	9	Amalapuram (SC)	53	Mummidivaram (SC)
3	Bobbili	17	Etcherla (SC)	9	Amalapuram (SC)	54	Allavaram (SC)
3	Bobbili	18	Cheepurupalli	9	Amalapuram (SC)	55	Amalapuram
3	Bobbili	19	Gajapathinagaram	9	Amalapuram (SC)	56	Kothapeta
3	Bobbili	20	Vizianagaram	9	Amalapuram (SC)	57	Nagaram (SC)
3	Bobbili	21	Sathivada	9	Amalapuram (SC)	58	Razole
4	Visakhapatnam	22	Bhogapuram	10	Narsapur	59	Narasapur
4	Visakhapatnam	23	Bhemmunipatnam	10	Narsapur	60	Palacole
4	Visakhapatnam	24	Visakhapatnam-I	10	Narsapur	61	Achanta (SC)
4	Visakhapatnam	25	Visakhapatnam-II	10	Narsapur	62	Bhimavaram
4	Visakhapatnam	26	Pendurthi	10	Narsapur	63	Undi
4	Visakhapatnam	27	Uttarapalli	10	Narsapur	64	Penugonda
4	Visakhapatnam	28	Srungavarapukota (ST)	10	Narsapur	66	Attili
5	Bhadrachalam (ST)	29	Paderu (ST)	11	Eluru	65	Tanuku
5	Bhadrachalam (ST)	37	Chintapalli (ST)	11	Eluru	67	Tadepalligudem
5	Bhadrachalam (ST)	38	Yellavaram (ST)	11	Eluru	68	Ungutur
5	Bhadrachalam (ST)	71	Gopalapuram (SC)	11	Eluru	69	Dendulur
5	Bhadrachalam (ST)	73	Polavaram (ST)	11	Eluru	70	Eluru
5	Bhadrachalam (ST)	274	Bhadrachalam (ST)	11	Eluru	74	Chintalapudi
5	Bhadrachalam (ST)	275	Burgampahad (ST)	11	Eluru	87	Kaikalur
6	Anakapalli	30	Madugula	12	Machilipatnam	82	Nuzvid
6	Anakapalli	31	Chodavaram	12	Machilipatnam	83	Gannavaram
6	Anakapalli	32	Anakapalli	12	Machilipatnam	84	Vuyyur
6	Anakapalli	33	Paravada	12	Machilipatnam	85	Gudivada
6	Anakapalli	34	Elamanchili	12	Machilipatnam	86	Mundinepalli
6	Anakapalli	35	Payakaraopeta (SC)	12	Machilipatnam	88	Malleswaram
6	Anakapalli	36	Narsipatnam	12	Machilipatnam	89	Bandar
28	Nagarkurnool (SC)	188	Achampet (SC)	13	Vijayawada	75	Jaggayapeta
28	Nagarkurnool (SC)	189	Nagarkurnool	13	Vijayawada	76	Nandigama
28	Nagarkurnool (SC)	190	Kalwakurthy	13	Vijayawada	77	Vijayawada West
28	Nagarkurnool (SC)	191	Shadnagar (SC)	13	Vijayawada	78	Vijayawada East
28	Nagarkurnool (SC)	192	Jadcherla	13	Vijayawada	79	Kankipadu
28	Nagarkurnool (SC)	195	Kollapur	13	Vijayawada	80	Mylavaram
28	Nagarkurnool (SC)	203	Pargi	13	Vijayawada	81	Tiruvuru (SC)
29	Mahbubnagar	193	Mahbubnagar	14	Tenali	90	Nidumolu (SC)
29	Mahbubnagar	194	Wanaparthy	14	Tenali	91	Avanigadda
29	Mahbubnagar	196	Alampur	14	Tenali	93	Repalle
29	Mahbubnagar	197	Gadwal	14	Tenali	94	Vemur
29	Mahbubnagar	198	Amarchinta	14	Tenali	95	Duggirala
29	Mahbubnagar	199	Makthal	14	Tenali	96	Tenali
29	Mahbubnagar	200	Kodangal	14	Tenali	102	Mangalagiri
30	Hyderabad	201	Tandur	15	Guntur	99	Prathipadu (Guntur)
30	Hyderabad	202	Vikarabad (SC)	15	Guntur	100	Guntur-I
30	Hyderabad	204	Chevella	15	Guntur	101	Guntur-II
30	Hyderabad	215	Karwan	15	Guntur	103	Tadikonda (SC)
30	Hyderabad	216	Yakutpura	15	Guntur	104	Sattenapalli
30	Hyderabad	217	Chandrayangutta	15	Guntur	105	Peddakurapadu
30	Hyderabad	218	Charminar	15	Guntur	110	Chilakaluripet
31	Secunderabad	206	Musheerabad	16	Bapatla	92	Kuchinapudi
31	Secunderabad	207	Himayatnagar	16	Bapatla	97	Ponnur
31	Secunderabad	208	Sanathnagar	16	Bapatla	98	Bapatla
31	Secunderabad	209	Secunderabad	16	Bapatla	111	Chirala
31	Secunderabad	210	Khairatabad	16	Bapatla	112	Parchur
31	Secunderabad	213	Asafnagar	16	Bapatla	113	Martur
31	Secunderabad	214	Maharajgunj	16	Bapatla	114	Addanki
32	Siddipet (SC)	211	Secunderabad Cantt. (SC)	17	Narasaraopet	106	Gurazala
32	Siddipet (SC)	219	Medchal	17	Narasaraopet	107	Macherla
32	Siddipet (SC)	220	Siddipet	17	Narasaraopet	108	Vinukonda
32	Siddipet (SC)	221	Dommat	17	Narasaraopet	109	Narasaraopeta
32	Siddipet (SC)	222	Gajwel (SC)	17	Narasaraopet	120	Cumbum
32	Siddipet (SC)	223	Narsapur	17	Narasaraopet	121	Darsi
32	Siddipet (SC)	228	Ramayampet	17	Narasaraopet	122	Markapuram
33	Medak	224	Sangareddy	18	Ongole	115	Ongole
33	Medak	225	Zahirabad	18	Ongole	116	Santhanuthalapadu (SC)
33	Medak	226	Narayankhed	18	Ongole	117	Kandukur
33	Medak	227	Medak	18	Ongole	118	Kanigiri
33	Medak	229	Andole (SC)	18	Ongole	119	Kondepi
33	Medak	232	Kamareddy	18	Ongole	124	Udayagiri
33	Medak	233	Yellareddy	18	Ongole	125	Kavali
34	Nizamabad	230	Balkonda	19	Nellore (SC)	126	Allur
34	Nizamabad	231	Armoor	19	Nellore (SC)	127	Kovur
34	Nizamabad	234	Jukkal (SC)	19	Nellore (SC)	128	Atmakur (Nellore)
34	Nizamabad	235	Banswada	19	Nellore (SC)	129	Rapur
34	Nizamabad	236	Bodhan	19	Nellore (SC)	130	Nellore
34	Nizamabad	237	Nizamabad	19	Nellore (SC)	131	Sarvepalli
34	Nizamabad	238	Dichpalli	19	Nellore (SC)	132	Gudur (SC)
35	Adilabad	239	Mudhole	20	Tirupathi (SC)	133	Sullurupeta (SC)
35	Adilabad	240	Nirmal	20	Tirupathi (SC)	134	Venkatagiri
35	Adilabad	241	Boath (ST)	20	Tirupathi (SC)	135	Srikalahasti
35	Adilabad	242	Adilabad	20	Tirupathi (SC)	136	Satyavedu (SC)
35	Adilabad	243	Khanapur (ST)	20	Tirupathi (SC)	137	Nagari
35	Adilabad	244	Asifabad	20	Tirupathi (SC)	138	Puttur
35	Adilabad	246	Sirpur	20	Tirupathi (SC)	149	Tirupathi
36	Peddapalli (SC)	245	Luxettipet	21	Chittoor	139	Vepanjeri (SC)
36	Peddapalli (SC)	247	Chinnur (SC)	21	Chittoor	140	Chittoor
36	Peddapalli (SC)	248	Manthani	21	Chittoor	141	Palamaner (SC)
36	Peddapalli (SC)	249	Peddapalli	21	Chittoor	142	Kuppam
36	Peddapalli (SC)	250	Myadaram (SC)	21	Chittoor	143	Punganur
36	Peddapalli (SC)	251	Huzurabad	21	Chittoor	147	Pileru
36	Peddapalli (SC)	253	Indurthi	21	Chittoor	148	Chandragiri
37	Karimnagar	254	Karimnagar	22	Rajampet	144	Madanapalle
37	Karimnagar	255	Choppadandi	22	Rajampet	145	Thamballapalle
37	Karimnagar	256	Jagtial	22	Rajampet	146	Vayalpad
37	Karimnagar	257	Buggaram	22	Rajampet	150	Kodur (SC)
37	Karimnagar	258	Metpalli	22	Rajampet	151	Rajampet
37	Karimnagar	259	Sircilla	22	Rajampet	152	Rayachoty
37	Karimnagar	260	Narella (SC)	22	Rajampet	153	Laakkireddipalli
38	Hanamkonda	252	Kamalapur	23	Cuddapah	154	Cuddapah
38	Hanamkonda	261	Cheriyal	23	Cuddapah	155	Badvel
38	Hanamkonda	262	Jangaon	23	Cuddapah	156	Mydukur
38	Hanamkonda	268	Ghanpur Station (SC)	23	Cuddapah	157	Proddatur
38	Hanamkonda	270	Hanamkonda	23	Cuddapah	158	Jammalamadugu
38	Hanamkonda	271	Shyampet	23	Cuddapah	159	Kamalapuram
38	Hanamkonda	272	Parkal (SC)	23	Cuddapah	160	Pulivendula
39	Warangal	263	Chennur	24	Hindupur	161	Kadiri
39	Warangal	264	Dornakal	24	Hindupur	162	Nallamada
39	Warangal	265	Mahabubabad	24	Hindupur	163	Gorantla
39	Warangal	266	Narsampet	24	Hindupur	164	Hindupur
39	Warangal	267	Wardhannapet	24	Hindupur	165	Madakasira
39	Warangal	269	Warangal	24	Hindupur	166	Penukonda
39	Warangal	273	Mulug (ST)	24	Hindupur	173	Dharmavaram
40	Khammam	276	Kothagudem	25	Anantapur	167	Kalyanadurg (SC)
40	Khammam	277	Sathupalli	25	Anantapur	168	Rayadurg
40	Khammam	278	Madhira	25	Anantapur	169	Uravakonda
40	Khammam	279	Palair (SC)	25	Anantapur	170	Gooty
40	Khammam	280	Khammam	25	Anantapur	171	Singanamala (SC)
40	Khammam	281	Shujatnagar	25	Anantapur	172	Anantapur
40	Khammam	282	Yellandu (ST)	25	Anantapur	174	Tadipatri
41	Nalgonda	205	Ibrahimpatnam (SC)	26	Kurnool	175	Alur (SC)
41	Nalgonda	212	Malakpet	26	Kurnool	176	Adoni
41	Nalgonda	289	Nalgonda	26	Kurnool	177	Yemmiganur
41	Nalgonda	291	Alair (SC)	26	Kurnool	178	Kodumur (SC)
41	Nalgonda	292	Bhongir	26	Kurnool	179	Kurnool
41	Nalgonda	293	Mungode	26	Kurnool	180	Pattikonda
41	Nalgonda	294	Devarakonda (ST)	26	Kurnool	181	Dhone
42	Miryalguda	283	Tungaturthi	27	Nandyal	123	Giddalur
42	Miryalguda	284	Suryapet (SC)	27	Nandyal	182	Koilakuntla
42	Miryalguda	285	Kodad	27	Nandyal	183	Allagadda
42	Miryalguda	286	Miryalaguda	27	Nandyal	184	Panyam
42	Miryalguda	287	Chalakurthi	27	Nandyal	185	Nandikotkur
42	Miryalguda	288	Nakrekal	27	Nandyal	186	Nandyal
42	Miryalguda	290	Ramannapet	27	Nandyal	187	Atmakur (Kurnool)

== Parties and alliances ==
Alliance/Party		Flag	Symbol	Leader	Seats contested	
NDA	Telugu Desam Party			N. Chandrababu Naidu	267	294
NDA	Bharatiya Janata Party			N. Indrasena Reddy	27	294
INC+	Indian National Congress			D. Srinivas	223+11	268+22 (Note: INC, TRS, CPI or CPI(M) did not field candidates in four constituencies: Chittoor, Madanapalle, Uravakonda and Waradhanapet.)
INC+	Telangana Rashtra Samithi			K. Chandrasekhar Rao	37+17	268+22
INC+	Communist Party of India (Marxist)			B. V. Raghavulu	4+10	268+22
INC+	Communist Party of India			K. Narayana	4+8	268+22
All India Majlis-e-Ittehadul Muslimeen				Akbaruddin Owaisi	7	

== Candidates ==
Constituency		INC+		NDA	
#	Name	Party	Candidate	Party	Candidate
1	Ichapuram	INC	Naresh Kumar Agarwal	TDP	Yakambari Dakkata
2	Sompeta	INC	Jagannayakulu Juttu	TDP	Gouthu Syam Sivaji
3	Tekkali	INC	Appayya Dora Hanumanthu	TDP	L. L. Naidu
4	Harishchandrapuram	INC	Duvvada Vani	TDP	Kinjarapu Atchannaidu
5	Narasannapeta	INC	Dharmana Krishna Das	TDP	Baggu Lakshmana Rao
6	Patapatnam	INC	Gorle Haribabu Naidu	TDP	Kalamata Mohana Rao
7	Kothuru (ST)	INC	Gomango Janni Minathi	TDP	Nimmaka Gopala Rao
8	Naguru (ST)	CPI(M)	Kolaka Laxmana Murty	TDP	Nimmaka Jayaraju
9	Parvathipuram	INC	Satrucharla Vijaya Rama Raju	TDP	D. Jagadeeswara Rao
10	Salur (ST)	INC	Peedika Rajanna Dora	TDP	R. P. Bhanj Deo
11	Bobbili	INC	R. V. Sujay Krishna	TDP	S. V. China Naidu
12	Therlam	INC	Vasi Reddy Varada Rama Rao	TDP	Tentu Jaya Prakash
13	Vunukuru	INC	Palavalasa Rajasekharam	TDP	Kimidi Kalavenkata Rao
14	Palakonda (SC)	INC	Tompala Rajababu	TDP	Kambala Jogulu
15	Amadalavalasa	INC	Boddepalli Satyavathi	TDP	Thammineni Seetharam
16	Srikakulam	INC	Dharmana Prasada Rao	TDP	Gunda Appala Suryanarayana
17	Etcherla (SC)	INC	Kondru Murali Mohan	TDP	K. Prathibha Bharathi
18	Cheepurupalli	INC	Botsa Satyanarayana	TDP	Gadde Babu Rao
19	Gajapathinagaram	INC	V. Narayana Appala Naidu	TDP	Aruna Padala
20	Vizianagaram	INC	Gurana Sadhu Rao	TDP	Ashok Gajapathi Raju
21	Sathivada	INC	Penumatsa Sambasiva Raju	TDP	Suryanarayana Potnuru
22	Bhogapuram	INC	Appala Swamy Kommuru	TDP	P. Narayanaswamy Naidu
23	Bheemunipatnam	INC	Seetharamu Karri	TDP	D. P. A. N. Raju Rajasagi
24	Visakhapatnam-I	INC	Dronamraju Satyanarayana	BJP	Kambhampati Hari Babu
25	Visakhapatnam-II	INC	Rangaraju Saripalli	TDP	Palla Simhachalam
26	Pendurthi	INC	Tippala Gurumurthy Reddy	TDP	Gudivada Nagamani
27	Uttarapalli	INC	Mangapathirao Pudi	TDP	Kolla Appalanaidu
28	Srungavarapukota (ST)	INC	Kumbha Ravibabu	TDP	Hymavathi Devi Sobha
29	Paderu (ST)	INC	Balaraju Matsyarasa	TDP	Matsyarasa Manikumari
30	Madugula	INC	Dharmasri Karanam	TDP	Reddy Satyanarayana
31	Chodavaram	INC	Balireddy Satya Rao	TDP	Ganta Srinivasa Rao
32	Anakapalli	INC	Konathala Ramakrishna	TDP	Dadi Veerabhadra Rao
33	Paravada	INC	Gandi Babji	TDP	Bandaru Murthy
34	Elamanchili	INC	Kanna Babu	TDP	G. Venkata Nageswara Rao
35	Payakaraopeta (SC)	INC	Vijaya Kumari Ambati	TDP	Changala Venkata Rao
36	Narsipatnam	INC	Ramachandra Petla	TDP	C. Ayyanna Patrudu
37	Chintapalli (ST)	CPI	Goddeti Demudu	TDP	Gnaneswari Challangi
38	Yellavaram (ST)	INC	Pallala Venkataramana Reddy	TDP	Chinnam Babu Ramesh
39	Burugupudi	INC	Chitturi Ravindra	TDP	Annapurna Pendurthi
40	Rajahmundry	INC	Routhu Suryaprakasa Rao	TDP	G. Butchaiah Chowdary
41	Kadiam	INC	J. Rammohan Rao	BJP	Somu Veerraju
42	Jaggampeta	INC	Thota Narasimham	TDP	Jyothula Nehru
43	Peddapuram	INC	Thota Gopala Krishna	TDP	Boddu Bhaskara Rama Rao
44	Prathipadu	INC	Varupula Subbarao	TDP	Bapanamma Parvatha
45	Tuni	INC	S. R. V. V. Krishnam Raju	TDP	Yanamala Rama Krishnudu
46	Pithapuram	INC	Koppana Mohanarao	BJP	Pendem Dorababu
47	Sampara	INC	Anisetti Bulliabbai Reddy	TDP	Guthula Venkata Satyavani
48	Kakinada	INC	Mutta Gopalakrishna	TDP	Vanamadi Venkateswara Rao
49	Tallarevu	INC	Dommeti Venkateswarlu	TDP	Chikkala Ramachandra Rao
50	Anaparthy	INC	Tetali Ramareddy	TDP	Moolareddy Nallamilli
51	Ramachandrapuram	INC	Pampana Arjunarao	TDP	Thota Trimurthulu
52	Alamuru	INC	Bikkina Krishnarjuna Ch.	TDP	V. Jogeswara Rao
53	Mummidivaram (SC)	INC	Pinipe Viswarup	TDP	Chelli Seshakumari
54	Allavaram (SC)	INC	Gollapalli Suryarao	TDP	Pandu Swarupa Rani
55	Amalapuram	INC	Tadi Tatarao	TDP	Metla Satyanarayana Rao
56	Kothapeta	INC	Chirla Jaggi Reddy	TDP	Bandaru Satyananda Rao
57	Nagaram (SC)	INC	Pamula Rajeswari Devi	BJP	Manepalli Ayyaji Vema
58	Razole	INC	Alluri Krishnam Raju	TDP	Alluri Suryanarayana
59	Narasapur	INC	Mudunuri Prasada Raju	TDP	K. Subbarayudu
60	Palacole	INC	Gunnam Nagababu	TDP	Ch. Satyanarayana Murty
61	Achanta (SC)	INC	Anand Prakash Chellem	TDP	Peethala Sujatha
62	Bhimavaram	INC	Grandhi Srinivas	TDP	P. Venkata Narasimharaju
63	Undi	INC	Pathapati Sarraju	TDP	K. Ramachandra Raju
64	Penugonda	INC	Pithani Satyanarayana	TDP	K. Veera Raghavendra Rao
65	Tanuku	INC	Chitturi Bapineedu	TDP	Y. T. Raja
66	Attili	INC	C. Ranganadha Raju	TDP	Dandu Sivarama Raju
67	Tadepalligudem	INC	Kottu Satyanarayana	TDP	Kanaka Sundara Rao Pasala
68	Ungutur	INC	Vatti Vasant Kumar	TDP	Immanni Rajeswari
69	Dendulur	INC	Maganti V. Rao	TDP	Garapati Sambasiva Rao
70	Eluru	INC	Alla Nani	TDP	Maradani Ranga Rao
71	Gopalapuram (SC)	INC	Maddala Suneeta	TDP	Abbulu Koppaka
72	Kovvur	INC	G. S. Rao	TDP	P. Venkata Krishna Rao
73	Polavaram (ST)	INC	Tellam Balaraju	TDP	Sunnam Bujji
74	Chintalapudi	INC	Ghanta Murali Ramakrishna	TDP	Kotagiri Vidyadher Rao
75	Jaggayyapet	INC	Samineni Udayabhanu	TDP	Sriraghuram Nettem
76	Nandigama	INC	Vasantha Nageswara Rao	TDP	Uma Maheswara Rao
77	Vijayawada West	CPI	Shaik Nasar Vali	TDP	M. K. Baig
78	Vijayawada East	INC	Vangaveeti Radha Krishnan	BJP	Yeleswarapu Jagan Mohan
79	Kankipadu	INC	Devineni Nehru	TDP	Gadde Rama Mohan
80	Mylavaram	INC	Chanamolu Venkata Rao	TDP	Vadde S. Rao
81	Tiruvuru (SC)	INC	Koneru Ranga Rao	TDP	Nallagatla Swamy Das
82	Nuzvid	INC	Meka Venkata Apparao	TDP	Kotagiri Hanumantha Rao
83	Gannavaram	INC	Kadiyala Buchi Babu	TDP	D. V. Balavardhanarao
84	Vuyyur	INC	Kolusu Parthasarathy	TDP	Chalasani Venkateswara Rao
85	Gudivada	INC	Eswar Kumar Katari	TDP	Kodali Nani
86	Mudinepalli	INC	Pinnamaneni V. Rao	TDP	Smt. Yerneni Sitadevi
87	Kaikalur	INC	Yerneni Raja Ramachandar	TDP	Kammili Vital Rao
88	Malleswaram	INC	Buragadda Veda Vyas	TDP	Kagitha Venkatarao
89	Bandar	INC	Perni Venkata Ramaiah	TDP	Nadakuditi Narasimha Rao
90	Nidumolu (SC)	CPI(M)	Ramaiah Paturu	TDP	Uppuleti Kalpana
91	Avanigadda	INC	Buddha Prasad Mandali	TDP	Buragadda Ramesh Naidu
92	Kuchinapudi	INC	M. Venkata Ramana Rao	TDP	Kesana Sankara Rao
93	Repalle	INC	Devineni Mallikharjunarao	TDP	Mummaneni Venaktasubbaiah
94	Vemur	INC	Satishpaul Raj	TDP	Alapati Rajendra Prasad
95	Duggirala	INC	Gudibandi Venkata Reddy	TDP	Chandu Sambasivarao
96	Tenali	INC	Nadendla Manohar	TDP	Gogineni Uma
97	Ponnur	INC	Mannava Raja Kishore	TDP	Narendra Dhulipalla
98	Bapatla	INC	Gade Venkata Reddy	TDP	Ananthavarma Manthena
99	Prathipad	INC	Ravi Venkata Ramana	TDP	Pedarattaiah Makineni
100	Guntur-I	INC	Shaik Subani	TDP	Ziauddin Sm
101	Guntur-II	INC	Tadisetti Venkat Rao	TDP	Dr. T. V. Rao
102	Mangalagiri	INC	M. Hanumantha Rao (Note: Friendly contest between INC and CPI(M) in following assembly constituencies: Mangalagiri, Kovur and Nalgonda)	BJP	Tammisetty Janaki Devi
102	Mangalagiri	CPI(M)	N. Rama Mohana Rao	BJP	Tammisetty Janaki Devi
103	Tadikonda (SC)	INC	D. Manikya Prasad	TDP	J. R. Pushpa Raju
104	Sattenapalli	INC	Verram Venkateswara Reddy	TDP	Kallam Anji Reddy
105	Peddakurapadu	INC	Kanna Lakshminarayana	TDP	D. Revathi Rosaiah
106	Gurzala	INC	Janga Krishna Murthy	TDP	Yarapatineni Srinivasarao
107	Macherla	INC	Pinnelli Lakshma Reddy	TDP	Julakanti Reddy
108	Vinukonda	INC	Makkena Mallikarjuna Rao	TDP	Gonuguntla Leelavathi
109	Narasaraopet	INC	Kasu Venkata Krishna Reddy	TDP	Kodela Siva Prasada Rao
110	Chilakaluripet	INC	Malladi Siva Narayana	TDP	Prathipati Pulla Rao
111	Chirala	INC	Konijeti Rosaiah	TDP	Paleti Rama Rao
112	Parchur	INC	Daggubati Venkateswara Rao	TDP	Chenchu Garataiah Bachina
113	Martur	INC	Gottipati Ravi Kumar	TDP	Gottipati Narasimha Rao
114	Addanki	INC	Jagarlamudi Raghava Rao	TDP	Karanam Krishna Murthy
115	Ongole	INC	Balineni S. Reddy	TDP	Sidda Raghava Rao
116	Santhanuthalapadu (SC)	INC	Dara Sambaiah	TDP	David Raju Palaparthi
117	Kandukur	INC	M. Maheedhar Reddy	TDP	Dr. Divi Siva Ram
118	Kanigiri	INC	Erigineni Thirupathi Naidu	TDP	Kasi Reddy Mukku
119	Kondepi	INC	Pothula Rama Rao	TDP	Anjaneyulu Damacharla
120	Cumbum	INC	Vudumula Srinivasulu Reddy	TDP	Chegireddy Linga Reddy
121	Darsi	INC	Pitchi Reddy Sanikommu	TDP	Kadiri Babu Rao
122	Markapur	INC	K. Pedda Konda Reddy	TDP	Kandula Narayana Reddy
123	Giddalur	INC	Pagadala Ramaiah	TDP	Pidathala Sai Kalpana
124	Udayagiri	INC	M. Chandrasekhar Reddy	TDP	Kambham Vijayarami Reddy
125	Kavali	INC	Magunta Parvathamma	TDP	Janakiram Madala
126	Allur	INC	K. Vishnuvardhan Reddy	TDP	Beeda Masthan Rao
127	Kovur	INC	P. Srinivasulu Reddy	TDP	N. Prasanna Kumar Reddy
127	Kovur	CPI(M)	Jakka Venkaiah	TDP	N. Prasanna Kumar Reddy
128	Atmakur	INC	B. Sundara Rami Reddy	BJP	Bollineni Krishnaiah
129	Rapur	INC	Anam Reddy	TDP	Yellasiri Srinivasulu Reddy
130	Nellore	INC	Anam Vivekananda Reddy	BJP	Sannapareddy Suresh Reddy
131	Sarvepalli	INC	Adala Prabhakara Reddy	TDP	S. Chandra Mohan Reddy
132	Gudur (SC)	INC	Patra Prakasa Rao	TDP	Dr. Vukkala Rajeswaramma
133	Sulurpet (SC)	INC	Nelavala Subrahmanyam	TDP	Parasa Venkata Ratnaiah
134	Venkatagiri	INC	Nedurumalli Rajyalakshmi	TDP	Y. V. Saikrishna Bhaskara
135	Sri Kalahasti	INC	S. C. V. Naidu	TDP	B. Gopala Krishna Reddy
136	Satyavedu (SC)	INC	K. Narayana Swamy	TDP	N. Sivaprasad
137	Nagari	INC	Reddyvari Chengareddy	TDP	Roja Selvamani
138	Puttur	INC	Gali Muddu Naidu	TDP	Kandati Sankar Reddy
139	Vepanjeri (SC)	INC	Gummadi Kuthuhalamma	TDP	O. Chandramma
140	Chittoor			TDP	A. S. Manohar
141	Palmaner (SC)	INC	M. Thippeswamy	TDP	L. Lalitha Kumari
142	Kuppam	INC	M. Subramanyam Reddy	TDP	N. Chandrababu Naidu
143	Punganur	INC	R. Reddeppa Reddy	TDP	N. Amaranatha Reddy
144	Madanpalle			TDP	Dommalapati Ramesh
145	Thamballapalle	INC	Kadapa Prabakar Reddy	BJP	Challapalle Narashima Reddy
146	Vayalpad	INC	Kiran Kumar Reddy	TDP	S. Imtiyaz Ahmad
147	Pileru	INC	P. Ramachandra Reddy	TDP	G. V. Sreenatha Reddy
148	Chandragiri	INC	Galla Aruna Kumari	TDP	E. Ramanadham Naidu
149	Tirupathi	INC	M. Venkataramana	TDP	N. V. Prasad
150	Kodur (SC)	INC	Gunti Venkateswara Prasad	TDP	Jayamma Yerrathota
151	Rajampet	INC	Konduru Prabhavatamma	TDP	Brahmaiah Pasupuleti
152	Rayachoty	INC	Sreelatha Minnamreddy	TDP	Sugavasi Palakondrayudu
153	Lakkireddipalli	INC	Gadikota Srikanth Reddy	TDP	R. Ramesh Kumar Reddy
154	Cuddapah	INC	Ahamadulla Mohammad Syed	TDP	Kandula Sivananda Reddy
155	Badvel	INC	Devasani Chinna Govinda	TDP	Konireddy Vijayamma
156	Mydukur	INC	D. L. Ravindra Reddy	TDP	Raghu Rami Reddy Settipalli
157	Proddatur	INC	N. Varada Rajulu Reddy	BJP	Kovvuru Balachandra Reddy
158	Jammalamadugu	INC	Ch. Adinarayana Reddy	TDP	P. Rama Subba Reddy
159	Kamalapuram	INC	Putha Narasimha Reddy	TDP	Gandluru Veera Siva Reddy
160	Pulivendla	INC	Y. S. Rajasekhara Reddy	TDP	S. V. Sathish Kumar Reddy
161	Kadiri	INC	Jonna Ramaiah	BJP	M. S. Partha Sarathi
162	Nallamada	INC	Kadapala Mohan Reddy	TDP	Palle Raghunatha Reddy
163	Gorantla	INC	Pamudurthi Ravindra Reddy	TDP	Kristappa Nimmala
164	Hindupur	INC	B. Naveen Nischal	TDP	P. Ranganayakulu
165	Madakasira	INC	Raghu Veera Reddy	TDP	Y. T. Prabhakar Reddy
166	Penukonda	INC	Gangula Bhanumathi	TDP	Paritala Ravindra
167	Kalyandrug (SC)	INC	Sugepalli Umadevi	TDP	B. C. Govindappa
168	Rayadrug	INC	Patil Venugopal Reddy	TDP	Mettu Govinda Reddy
169	Uravakonda			TDP	Payyavula Keshav
170	Gooty	INC	N. Neelavathi	TDP	K. C. Narayana
171	Singanamala (SC)	INC	Sake Sailajanath	TDP	Pamidi Samanthaka Mani
172	Anantapur	INC	B. Narayana Reddy	TDP	K. M. Rahamthullah
173	Dharmavaram	CPI	G. Nagi Reddy	TDP	Gonuguntla Jayalakshmamma
174	Tadpatri	INC	Divakar Reddy	TDP	K. Suryaprathapa Reddy
175	Alur (SC)	INC	Mulunti Mareppa	TDP	Masala Padmaja
176	Adoni	INC	Y. Sai Prasad Reddy	TDP	G. Krishnamma
177	Yemmiganur	INC	K. Chennakesava Reddy	TDP	B. V. Mohan Reddy
178	Kodumur (SC)	INC	M. Sikhamani	TDP	Akepogu Prabhakar Rao
179	Kurnool	CPI(M)	M. Abdul Gafoor	TDP	T. G. Venkatesh
180	Pattikonda	CPI	P. Ramachandraiah	TDP	S. V. Subba Reddy
181	Dhone	INC	Kotla Sujathamma	TDP	K. E. Prabhakar
182	Koilkuntla	INC	Challa Ramakrishna Reddy	TDP	Yarrabothula Venkata Reddy
183	Allagadda	INC	G. Prathap Reddy	TDP	Bhuma Nagi Reddy
184	Panyam	INC	Katasani Rambhupal Reddy	TDP	Bijjam Partha Sarathi Reddy
185	Nandikotkur	INC	Gowru Charitha Reddy	TDP	Byreddy Rajasekhar Reddy
186	Nandyal	INC	Silpa Mohan Reddy	TDP	N. Md. Farooq
187	Atmakur	INC	Erasu Prathap Reddy	TDP	Budda Sailaja
188	Achampet (SC)	INC	C. Vamshi Krishna	TDP	P. Ramulu
189	Nagarkurnool	TRS	Kuchakulla Damodar Reddy	TDP	Nagam Janardhan Reddy
190	Kalwakurthi	INC	Yadma Kista Reddy	BJP	Thalloju Achari
191	Shadnagar (SC)	INC	P. Shankar Rao	TDP	Bakkani Narasimhulu
192	Jadcherla	TRS	C. Laxma Reddy	TDP	M. Chandra Shekar
193	Mahbubnagar	TRS	M. Srinivasulu	TDP	P. Chandra Sekhar
194	Wanaparthy	INC	G. Chinna Reddy	TDP	Kandoor Lavanya
195	Kollapur	TRS	Singireddy Niranjan	TDP	K. Madhusudhana Rao
196	Alampur	TRS	Ravula R. Reddy	TDP	Vavilala Suneetha
197	Gadwal	TRS	Nagardoddi Venkatramudu	TDP	Gattu Bheemudu
198	Amarchinta	INC	Salguti Sudhakar	TDP	K. Dayakar Reddy
199	Makthal	INC	Chittem Narsi Reddy	BJP	Nagurao Namaji
200	Kodangal	INC	Gurunath Reddy	TDP	N. M. Anuradha
201	Tandur	INC	Malkud Narayan Rao	TDP	P. Mahender Reddy
202	Vicarabad	TRS	A. Chandrasekhar	TDP	Madhura Veni Begari
203	Pargi	TRS	Singi Harivardhan Reddy	TDP	Koppula Harishwar Reddy
204	Chevella	INC	Sabitha Indra Reddy	TDP	Sama Bhoopal Reddy
205	Ibrahimpatnam (SC)	CPI(M)	Masku Narsimha	TDP	Ravi Kumar Narra
206	Musheerabad	TRS	Nayani Narasimha Reddy	BJP	K. Laxman
207	Himayatnagar	TRS	Govind Giri	BJP	G. Kishan Reddy
208	Sanathnagar	INC	Marri Shashidhar Reddy	TDP	S. Rajeshwar
209	Secunderabad	TRS	T. Padma Rao Goud	TDP	Talasani Srinivas Yadav
210	Khairatabad	INC	P. Janardhan Reddy	TDP	K. Vijaya Rama Rao
211	Secunderabad Cantt.	TRS	Ravula Anjaiah	TDP	G. Sayanna
212	Malakpet	INC	Malreddy Ranga Reddy	TDP	Manchireddy Kishan Reddy
213	Asafnagar	INC	N. Madhusudhan Gupta	TDP	Danam Nagender
214	Maharajgunj	INC	Mukesh Goud	BJP	Prem Singh Rathore
215	Karwan	INC	Ram Raj Singh	BJP	Baddam Bal Reddy
216	Yakutpura	INC	Syed Raza Hussain Azad (Note: Friendly contest between INC and TRS in following assembly constituencies: Yakutpura, Chandrayangutta, Kamareddy, Karimnagar and Choppadandi)	BJP	Siraj Unnissa Begum
216	Yakutpura	TRS	Mir Inayath Ali Baqri	BJP	Siraj Unnissa Begum
217	Chandrayangutta	INC	G. S. Seeta Rama Raju	TDP	K. Swarajya Lakshmi
217	Chandrayangutta	TRS	Taher Kamal Khundmiri	TDP	K. Swarajya Lakshmi
218	Charminar	INC	Y. Amarendhar Reddy	TDP	Tayyaba Tasleem
219	Medchal	TRS	K. Surender Reddy	TDP	Devender Goud
220	Siddipet	TRS	K. Chandrashekar Rao	TDP	Jilla Srinivas
221	Dommat	TRS	Solipeta Ramalinga Reddy	TDP	Cheruku Muthyam Reddy
222	Gajwel (SC)	INC	J. Geeta Reddy	TDP	D. Durgaiah
223	Narsapur	CPI	Chilumula Vittal Reddy (Note: Friendly contest between INC and CPI in Narsapur Assembly constituency)	TDP	Chilumula Madan Reddy
223	Narsapur	INC	Vakiti Sunitha Reddy	TDP	Chilumula Madan Reddy
224	Sangareddy	CPI(M)	Chukka Ramulu (Note: Friendly contest between CPI(M) and TRS in following assembly constituencies: Sangareddy, Bhadrachalam, Madhira, Miryalguda, Nakrekal and Bhongir)	BJP	K. Satyanarayana
224	Sangareddy	TRS	Jagga Reddy	BJP	K. Satyanarayana
225	Zahirabad	INC	Md. Fareeduddin	TDP	Chengal Baganna
226	Narayankhed	INC	Shetkar Suresh Kumar	TDP	M. Vijayapal Reddy
227	Medak	TRS	Y. Prabhakar Reddy	TDP	Karanam Uma Devi
228	Ramayampet	TRS	Padma D. Reddy	TDP	Mynampally Vani
229	Andole (SC)	INC	Damodar Narasimha	TDP	P. Babu Mohan
230	Balkonda	INC	K. R. Suresh Reddy	TDP	Vasanth Reddy
231	Armoor	TRS	S. Santosh Reddy	TDP	Annapurna Devi
232	Kamareddy	INC	Md. Ali Shabbir	BJP	V. Muralidhar Goud
232	Kamareddy	TRS	Venu Gopal Goud	BJP	V. Muralidhar Goud
233	Yellareddy	TRS	Eanugu Ravinder Reddy	TDP	Gampa Govardhan
234	Jukkal (SC)	INC	Gangaram Soudagar	TDP	Hanmanth Sindhe
235	Banswada	INC	Bajireddy Goverdhan	TDP	Pocharam Srinivas Reddy
236	Bodhan	INC	P. Sudarshan Reddy	TDP	Abdul Khader
237	Nizamabad	INC	D. Srinivas	TDP	Satish Pawar
238	Dichpalli	TRS	Gaddam Ganga Reddy	TDP	M. Venkateshwara Rao
239	Mudhole	TRS	Narayan Rao Patel	BJP	Jagdish Mashettiwar
240	Nirmal	INC	Allola Indrakaran Reddy	TDP	V. Satya Narayan Goud
241	Boath	TRS	Soyam Bapu Rao	TDP	G. Nagesh
242	Adilabad	INC	Chilukuri Ramchandar Reddy	TDP	Jogu Ramanna
243	Khanapur	TRS	Ajmeera Govind Naik	TDP	Ramesh Rathod
244	Asifabad	CPI	Gunda Mallesh (Note: Friendly contest between CPI and TRS in following assembly constituencies: Asifabad, Indurthi, Burgampahad, Munugode and Devarakonda)	TDP	Amurajula Sridevi
244	Asifabad	TRS	Jangampelli Rajamallu	TDP	Amurajula Sridevi
245	Luxettipet	INC	Nadipelli Diwakar Rao	TDP	Gone Hanmantha Rao
246	Sirpur	INC	Koneru Konappa	TDP	Palvai Rajyalaxmi
247	Chinnur (SC)	INC	G. Vinod	TDP	Boda Janardhan
248	Manthani	INC	D. Sridhar Babu	TDP	Somarapu Satyanarayana
249	Peddapalli	TRS	Geetla Mukunda Reddy	BJP	Gujjula Ramakrishna Reddy
250	Myadaram	TRS	Koppula Eshwar	TDP	Malem Mallesham
251	Huzurabad	TRS	V. Lakshmikantha Rao	TDP	E. Peddi Reddy
252	Kamalapur	TRS	Etela Rajender	TDP	M. Damodar Reddy
253	Indurthi	CPI	Chada Venkat Reddy	BJP	Polasani Sugunakar Rao
253	Indurthi	TRS	Desini Chinna Mallaiah	BJP	Polasani Sugunakar Rao
254	Karimnagar	INC	M. Satyanarayana Rao	TDP	Gandra Nalini
254	Karimnagar	TRS	Katakam Mruthyunjayam	TDP	Gandra Nalini
255	Choppadandi	INC	K. Satyanarayana Goud	TDP	Sana Maruthi
255	Choppadandi	TRS	Velichala Rajender Rao	TDP	Sana Maruthi
256	Jagtial	INC	T. Jeevan Reddy	TDP	L. Ramana
257	Buggaram	INC	Juvvadi Rathnakar Rao	TDP	Shikari Vishwanatham
258	Metpalli	TRS	K. V. Rajeshwar Rao	BJP	T. Venkata Ramana Reddy
259	Sircilla	TRS	Regulapati Papa Rao	TDP	C. Rajeshwara Rao
260	Narella	TRS	Lingaiah Kashipet	TDP	Suddala Devaiah
261	Cheriyal	TRS	Kommuri Pratap Reddy	TDP	Mandala Sriramlu
262	Jangaon	INC	Ponnala Lakshmaiah	TDP	Adaboina Basva Reddy
263	Chennur	TRS	Dugyala Srinivasa Rao	TDP	N. Sudhakar Rao
264	Dornakal	INC	Dharamsoth Redya Naik	TDP	Banoth Jayanth Nath
265	Mahbubabad	INC	Vedavelli Rajavardhan Reddy	TDP	Vem Narender Reddy
266	Narsampet	TRS	K. Laxma Reddy	TDP	Revuri Prakash Reddy
267	Wardhannapet			TDP	Errabelli Dayakar Rao
268	Ghanpur	TRS	G. Vijaya Rama Rao	TDP	Kadiyam Srihari
269	Warangal	INC	Basavaraju Saraiah	TDP	Gundu Sudha Rani
270	Hanamkonda	TRS	M. Satyanarayana Reddy	BJP	Dharma Rao Marthineni
271	Shyampet	INC	Konda Surekha	BJP	Gujjula Premendar Reddy
272	Parkal	TRS	Bandari Shara Rani	TDP	Sambaiah Dommati
273	Mulug (ST)	INC	Podem Veeraiah	TDP	Seethakka
274	Bhadrachalam	TRS	G. N. Madhusudhana Rao	TDP	Sode Ramaiah
274	Bhadrachalam	CPI(M)	Sunnam Rajaiah	TDP	Sode Ramaiah
275	Burgampahad	CPI	Payam Venkateswarlu	TDP	Thati Venkateswarlu
275	Burgampahad	TRS	Kunja Bhiksham	TDP	Thati Venkateswarlu
276	Kothagudem	INC	Vanama Venkateswara Rao	TDP	Koneru Nageswara Rao
277	Sathupalli	INC	Jalagam Venkat Rao	TDP	Thummala Nageswara Rao
278	Madhira	TRS	Gundlapalli Satyanarayana	TDP	Kondabala Koteswara Rao
278	Madhira	CPI(M)	Katta Venkata Narasaiah	TDP	Kondabala Koteswara Rao
279	Palair (SC)	INC	Sambani Chandrashekar	TDP	Sandra Venkata Veeraiah
280	Khammam	INC	Younis Sultan (Note: Friendly contest between INC, CPI and CPI(M) in Khammam Assembly constituency)	TDP	Balasani Laxminarayana
280	Khammam	CPI(M)	T. Veerabhadram	TDP	Balasani Laxminarayana
280	Khammam	CPI	Puvvada Nageswara Rao	TDP	Balasani Laxminarayana
281	Shujatnagar	INC	Ramreddy Venkata Reddy (Note: Friendly contest between INC, CPI and TRS in Shujatnagar Assembly constituency.)	TDP	Madhavi Potla
281	Shujatnagar	CPI	K. Sambasiva Rao	TDP	Madhavi Potla
281	Shujatnagar	TRS	Shankara Rao Gopagani	TDP	Madhavi Potla
282	Yellandu (ST)	INC	Bhaskar Naik Bukya	TDP	Kalpanabai Malothu
283	Tungaturthi	INC	Ramreddy Damodar Reddy	TDP	Sankineni Venkateshwar Rao
284	Suryapet (SC)	INC	Vedas Venkaiah	TDP	Palvai Rajani Kumari
285	Kodad	INC	N. Uttam Reddy	TDP	Venepalli Chander Rao
286	Miryalguda	CPI(M)	Julakanti Reddy	TDP	P. Chandrasekhar Reddy
286	Miryalguda	TRS	Tippana Vijaysimha Reddy	TDP	P. Chandrasekhar Reddy
287	Chalakurthi	INC	Kunduru Jana Reddy	TDP	G. Rammurthy Yadav
288	Nakrekal	TRS	Cheruku Sudhakar	TDP	Katikam Sathaiah Goud
288	Nakrekal	CPI(M)	Nomula Narsimhaiah	TDP	Katikam Sathaiah Goud
289	Nalgonda	INC	Komatireddy Venkat	TDP	Gutha Sukender Reddy
289	Nalgonda	CPI(M)	Nandiyala Narsimha Reddy	TDP	Gutha Sukender Reddy
290	Ramannapet	INC	Uppunuthula P. Reddy	BJP	Mallesham Dasari
291	Alair	TRS	Kududula Nagesh	TDP	Motkupalli Narasimhulu
292	Bhongir	TRS	Ale Narendra	TDP	Alimineti M. Reddy
292	Bhongir	CPI(M)	Mandula Suvarna	TDP	Alimineti M. Reddy
293	Mungode	CPI	Palla Venkata Reddy	TDP	Kashinath Chiluveru
293	Mungode	TRS	Karne Prabhakar	TDP	Kashinath Chiluveru
294	Deverkonda (ST)	CPI	Ramavath R. Kumar	TDP	Vadthya Shakru Naik
294	Deverkonda (ST)	TRS	Sabavath Ramulu Naik	TDP	Vadthya Shakru Naik

== Campaigns ==
=== Indian National Congress+ ===
The alliance comprising the INC, TRS, CPI(M) and CPI jointly fielded 268 candidates with one candidate nominated in each constituency. In 22 constituencies, a friendly contest took place between alliance partners. Additionally, the alliance did not field candidates in four constituencies, Chittoor (140), Madanapalle (144), Uravakonda (169) and Waradhanapet (267).

No.	Parties	Constituency	
No.	Parties	No.	Name
1	CPI and TRS	244	Asifabad
2	CPI and TRS	253	Indurthi
3	CPI and TRS	275	Burgampahad
4	CPI and TRS	293	Mungode
5	CPI and TRS	294	Deverkonda
6	CPI(M) and TRS	224	Sangareddy
7	CPI(M) and TRS	274	Bhadrachalam
8	CPI(M) and TRS	278	Madhira
9	CPI(M) and TRS	286	Miryalguda
10	CPI(M) and TRS	288	Nakrekal
11	CPI(M) and TRS	292	Bhongir
12	INC and CPI	223	Narsapur
13	INC, CPI and CPI(M)	280	Khammam
14	INC, CPI and TRS	281	Shujatnagar
15	INC and CPI(M)	102	Mangalagiri
16	INC and CPI(M)	127	Kovur
17	INC and CPI(M)	289	Nalgonda
18	INC and TRS	216	Yakutpura
19	INC and TRS	217	Chandrayangutta
20	INC and TRS	232	Kamareddy
21	INC and TRS	254	Karimnagar
22	INC and TRS	255	Choppadandi

== Results ==
=== Vote share ===
Vote share by party
1. Indian National Congress (38.6%)
2. Telugu Desam Party (37.6%)
3. Telangana Rashtra Samithi (6.68%)
4. Others (17.2%)

=== Seat share ===
Seat share by party
1. Indian National Congress (62.9%)
2. Telugu Desam Party (16.0%)
3. Telangana Rashtra Samithi (8.84%)
4. Others (12.2%)

=== Results by party ===
Source: Election Commission of India
Alliance/Party		Popular vote			Seats		
Alliance/Party		Votes	%	±pp	Contested	Won	+/−
INC+	Indian National Congress	13,793,461	38.56	▲2.95	234	185	▲94
INC+	Telangana Rashtra Samithi	2,390,940	6.68	▲6.68	54	26	▲26
INC+	Communist Party of India (Marxist)	656,721	1.84	▲0.14	14	9	▲7
INC+	Communist Party of India	545,867	1.53	▼0.09	12	6	▲6
INC+	Total	17,386,989	48.61	N/A	314	226	N/A
NDA	Telugu Desam Party	13,444,168	37.59	▼6.28	267	47	▼133
NDA	Bharatiya Janata Party	942,008	2.63	▼1.04	27	2	▼10
NDA	Total	14,386,176	40.22	▼7.32	294	49	▼143
All India Majlis-e-Ittehadul Muslimeen		375,165	1.05	▼0.03	7	4	Steady
Other parties		1,269,868	3.55	N/A	409	4	N/A
Independents		2,349,436	6.57	▲1.79	872	11	▲6
Total		35,767,634	100.00	N/A	1,896	294	N/A
Vote statistics
Valid votes		35,767,634	99.96				
Invalid votes		12,751	0.04				
Votes cast / turnout		35,780,385	69.96				
Abstentions		15,366,113	30.04				
Registered voters		51,146,498					

=== Results by district ===
District	Seats						
District	Seats	INC	TDP	TRS	CPM	CPI	OTH
Srikakulam	12	7	5	—N/a	—N/a	—N/a	—N/a
Vizianagaram	12	6	4	—N/a	1	—N/a	1
Visakhapatnam	13	8	3	—N/a	—N/a	1	1
East Godavari	21	16	2	—N/a	—N/a	—N/a	3
West Godavari	16	12	4	—N/a	—N/a	—N/a	—N/a
Krishna	17	12	2	—N/a	1	1	1
Guntur	19	17	1	—N/a	—N/a	—N/a	1
Prakasam	13	11	1	—N/a	—N/a	—N/a	1
Nellore	11	10	—N/a	—N/a	—N/a	—N/a	1
Chittoor	15	10	5	—N/a	—N/a	—N/a	—N/a
Kadapa	11	9	2	—N/a	—N/a	—N/a	—N/a
Anantapur	14	8	6	—N/a	—N/a	—N/a	—N/a
Kurnool	13	11	1	—N/a	1	—N/a	—N/a
Mahbubnagar	13	7	1	1	—N/a	—N/a	4
Ranga Reddy	6	2	2	1	1	—N/a	—N/a
Hyderabad	13	4	2	2	—N/a	—N/a	5
Medak	10	5	—N/a	4	—N/a	—N/a	1
Nizamabad	9	6	—N/a	3	—N/a	—N/a	—N/a
Adilabad	9	5	1	3	—N/a	—N/a	—N/a
Karimnagar	13	4	2	5	—N/a	1	1
Warangal	13	5	2	6	—N/a	—N/a	—N/a
Khammam	9	4	—N/a	—N/a	3	1	1
Nalgonda	12	6	1	1	2	2	—N/a
Total	294	185	47	26	9	6	21

=== Results by constituency ===
District	Constituency		Winner			Runner Up			Margin	
District	No.	Name	Candidate	Party	Votes	Candidate	Party	Votes	Margin	
Srikakulam	1	Ichchapuram	Agarwal Naresh Kumar	INC	51,927	Yakambari Dakkata	TDP	44,182	Margin	7,745
Srikakulam	2	Sompeta	Gouthu Syam Sunder Sivaji	TDP	53,668	Juttu Jagannayakulu	INC	42,518	11,150	
Srikakulam	3	Tekkali	Appayya Dora Hanumanthu	INC	49,480	L. L. Naidu	TDP	32,209	17,271	
Srikakulam	4	Harishchandrapuram	Kinjarapu Atchannaidu	TDP	70,756	Duvvada Vani	INC	33,395	37,361	
Srikakulam	5	Narasannapeta	Dharmana Krishna Das	INC	52,312	Baggu Lakshmana Rao	TDP	43,444	8,868	
Srikakulam	6	Pathapatnam	Kalamata Mohana Rao	TDP	44,357	Gorle Haribabu Naidu	INC	42,293	2,064	
Srikakulam	7	Kothuru (ST)	Gomango Janni Minathi	INC	47,963	Nimmaka Gopala Rao	TDP	44,446	3,517	
Vizianagaram	8	Naguru (ST)	Kolaka Lakshmana Murthy	CPI(M)	47,227	Nimmaka Jayaraju	TDP	38,526	8,701	
Vizianagaram	9	Parvathipuram	Satrucharla Vijaya Rama Raju	INC	48,276	Dwarapureddy Jagadeeswara Rao	TDP	46,480	1,796	
Vizianagaram	10	Salur (ST)	R. P. Bhanj Deo	TDP	48,580	Peedika Rajanna Dora	INC	46,087	2,493	
Vizianagaram	11	Bobbili	R. V. Sujay Krishna Ranga Rao	INC	53,581	S. V. China Appala Naidu	TDP	40,891	12,690	
Vizianagaram	12	Therlam	Thentu Jaya Prakash	TDP	56,104	Vasi Reddy Varada Rama Rao	INC	49,088	7,016	
Srikakulam	13	Vunukuru	Kimidi Kalavenkata Rao	TDP	61,762	Palavalasa Raja Sekharam	INC	48,876	12,886	
Srikakulam	14	Palakonda (SC)	Kambala Jogulu	TDP	42,327	Tompala Rajababu	INC	30,703	11,624	
Srikakulam	15	Amadalavalasa	Boddepalli Satyavathi	INC	46,300	Thammineni Seetharam	TDP	42,614	3,686	
Srikakulam	16	Srikakulam	Dharmana Prasada Rao	INC	69,168	Gunda Appala Suryanarayana	TDP	61,941	7,227	
Srikakulam	17	Etcherla (SC)	Kondru Murali Mohan	INC	58,676	K. Prathibha Bharathi	TDP	52,987	5,689	
Vizianagaram	18	Cheepurupalli	Botsa Satyanarayana	INC	58,008	Gadde Babu Rao	TDP	46,974	11,034	
Vizianagaram	19	Gajapathinagaram	Padala Aruna	TDP	45,530	Narayana Appala Naidu Vangapandu	INC	35,168	10,362	
Vizianagaram	20	Vizianagaram	Kolagatla Veerabhadra Swamy	IND	47,444	Ashok Gajapathi Raju	TDP	46,318	1,126	
Vizianagaram	21	Sathivada	Penumatsa Sambasiva Raju	INC	55,981	Potnuru Suryanarayana	TDP	52,091	3,890	
Vizianagaram	22	Bhogapuram	Pathivada Narayanaswamy Naidu	TDP	50,305	Kommuru Appala Swamy	INC	48,300	48,300	
Visakhapatnam	23	Bheemunipatnam	Seetharamu Karri	INC	57,619	D. P. A. N. Raju Rajasagi	TDP	57,378	241	
Visakhapatnam	24	Visakhapatnam-I	Dronamraju Satyanarayana	INC	41,652	Kambhampati Hari Babu	BJP	24,885	16,767	
Visakhapatnam	25	Visakhapatnam-II	Rangaraju Saripalli	INC	125,347	Palla Simhachalam	TDP	74,337	51,010	
Visakhapatnam	26	Pendurthi	Tippala Gurumurthy Reddy	INC	132,609	Gudivada Nagamani	TDP	114,459	18,150	
Vizianagaram	27	Uttarapalli	Pudi Mangapathirao	INC	55,505	Kolla Appalanaidu	TDP	39,789	15,716	
Vizianagaram	28	Srungavarapukota (ST)	D. Khumba Ravibabu	INC	55,224	Hymavathi Devi Sobha	TDP	49,362	5,862	
Visakhapatnam	29	Paderu (ST)	Lake Rajarao	BSP	33,890	Samida Ravi Sankar	IND	26,335	7,555	
Visakhapatnam	30	Madugula	Karanam Dharmasri	INC	50,361	Reddy Satyanarayana	TDP	41,624	8,737	
Visakhapatnam	31	Chodavaram	Ganta Srinivasa Rao	TDP	63,250	Balireddy Satya Rao	INC	53,649	9,601	
Visakhapatnam	32	Anakapalli	Konathala Ramakrishna	INC	63,277	Dadi Veerabhadra Rao	TDP	46,244	17,033	
Visakhapatnam	33	Paravada	Babji Gandi	INC	68,045	Bandaru Satyanarayana Murthy	TDP	57,250	10,795	
Visakhapatnam	34	Elamanchili	Kanna Babu	INC	54,819	Gontina Venkata Nageswara Rao	TDP	48,956	5,863	
Visakhapatnam	35	Payakaraopet (SC)	Changala Venkata Rao	TDP	40,794	Gantela Sumana	IND	27,105	13,689	
Visakhapatnam	36	Narsipatnam	Chintakayala Ayyanna Patrudu	TDP	60,689	Datla Venkata Suryanarayanaraju	IND	36,759	23,930	
Visakhapatnam	37	Chintapalle (ST)	Goddeti Demudu	CPI	52,716	Pasupuleti Balaraju	TDP	35,229	17,487	
East Godavari	38	Yellavaram (ST)	Chinnam Babu Ramesh	TDP	39,325	Pallala Venkataramana Reddy	INC	32,652	6,673	
East Godavari	39	Burugupudi	Chitturi Ravindra	INC	53,506	Annapurna Pendurthi	TDP	52,047	1,459	
East Godavari	40	Rajahmundry	Routhu Suryaprakasa Rao	INC	41,826	Gorantla Butchaiah Chowdary	TDP	34,272	7,554	
East Godavari	41	Kadiam	Jakkampudi Rammohana Rao	INC	79,290	Somu Veeraju	BJP	40,730	38,560	
East Godavari	42	Jaggampeta	Thota Narasimham	INC	62,566	Jyothula Venkata Apparao (Nehru)	TDP	59,923	2,643	
East Godavari	43	Peddapuram	Thota Gopala Krishna	INC	56,579	Boddu Bhaskara Rama Rao	TDP	45,995	10,584	
East Godavari	44	Prathipadu (East Godavari)	Varupula Subbarao	INC	70,962	Bapanamma Parvatha	TDP	52,594	18,368	
East Godavari	45	Tuni	Yanamala Rama Krishnudu	TDP	61,794	S. R. V. V. Krishnam Raju	INC	58,059	3,735	
East Godavari	46	Pithapuram	Dorababu Pendem	BJP	46,527	Koppana Venkata Chandra Mohanrao	INC	28,628	17,899	
East Godavari	47	Sampara	Anisetti Bulliabbai Reddy	INC	59,090	Guthula Venkata Satyavani	TDP	44,440	14,650	
East Godavari	48	Kakinada	Mutta Gopalakrishna	INC	70,902	Vanamadi Venkateswara Rao	TDP	37,456	33,446	
East Godavari	49	Tallarevu	Dommeti Venkateswarulu	INC	60,634	Chikkala Ramachandra Rao	TDP	46,035	14,599	
East Godavari	50	Anaparthy	Tetali Ramareddy	INC	61,194	Nellamilli Moola Reddy	TDP	32,466	28,728	
East Godavari	51	Ramachandrapuram	Pilli Subhash Chandra Bose	IND	53,160	Thota Trimurthulu	TDP	45,604	7,556	
East Godavari	52	Alamuru	Bikkina Krishnarjuna Chowdary	INC	58,488	Vegulla Jogeswara Rao	TDP	50,368	8,120	
East Godavari	53	Mummidivaram (SC)	Pinipe Viswarup	INC	53,759	Chelli Seshakumari	TDP	38,402	15,357	
East Godavari	54	Allavaram (SC)	Gollapalli Surya Rao	INC	45,948	Pandu Swarupa Rani	TDP	39,458	6,490	
East Godavari	55	Amalapuram	Kudupudi Chittabbai	IND	31,858	Metla Satyanarayana Rao	TDP	27,818	4,040	
East Godavari	56	Kothapeta	Chirla Jaggi Reddy	INC	54,265	Bandaru Satyananda Rao	TDP	51,994	2,271	
East Godavari	57	Nagaram (SC)	Pamula Rajeswari Devi	INC	36,325	Ayyaji Vema Manepalli	BJP	27,044	9,281	
East Godavari	58	Razole	Alluri Krishnam Raju	INC	68,104	Alluri Venkata Suryanarayana Raju (Pedababu)	TDP	40,086	28,018	
West Godavari	59	Narasapuram	Kothapalli Subbarayudu	TDP	63,288	Mudunuri Naga Raja Vara Prasada Raju	INC	59,770	3,518	
West Godavari	60	Palacole	Ch. Satyanarayana Murthy	TDP	46,077	Gunnam Nagababu	INC	34,076	12,001	
West Godavari	61	Achanta (SC)	Peethala Sujatha	TDP	46,670	Chellem Anand Prakash	INC	41,029	5,641	
West Godavari	62	Bhimavaram	Grandhi Srinivas	INC	63,939	Penmetsa Venkata Narasimharaju	TDP	56,034	7,905	
West Godavari	63	Undi	Pathapati Sarraju	INC	65,666	Kalidindi Ramachandra Raju	TDP	46,178	19,488	
West Godavari	64	Penugonda	Pithani Satyanarayana	INC	58,817	Kunapareddy Veera Raghavendra Rao	TDP	40,797	18,020	
West Godavari	65	Tanuku	Chitturi Bapineedu	INC	65,189	Y. T. Raja	TDP	59,812	5,377	
West Godavari	66	Attili	Cherukuwada Sri Ranganatha Raju	INC	53,070	Dandu Sivarama Raju	TDP	50,547	2,523	
West Godavari	67	Tadepalligudem	Kottu Satyanarayana	INC	72,477	Pasala Kanaka Sundara Rao	TDP	47,544	24,933	
West Godavari	68	Ungutur	Vatti Vasant Kumar	INC	77,380	Immanni Rajeswari	TDP	61,661	15,719	
West Godavari	69	Dendulur	Maganti Venkateswara Rao	INC	67,833	Garapati Sambasiva Rao	TDP	54,522	13,311	
West Godavari	70	Eluru	Alla Nani	INC	72,490	Maradani Ranga Rao	TDP	39,437	33,053	
West Godavari	71	Gopalpuram (SC)	Maddala Suneeta	INC	67,500	Koppaka Abbulu	TDP	59,878	7,622	
West Godavari	72	Kovvur	Pendyala Venkata Krishna Rao	TDP	65,329	G. S. Rao	INC	63,998	1,331	
West Godavari	73	Polavaram (ST)	Tellam Balaraju	INC	66,614	Sunnam Bujji	TDP	47,772	18,842	
West Godavari	74	Chintalapudi	Ganta Murali Ramakrishna	INC	75,144	Kotagiri Vidyadhara Rao	TDP	73,538	1,606	
Krishna	75	Jaggayyapet	Samineni Udayabhanu	INC	70,057	Nettem Sriraghuram	TDP	58,363	11,694	
Krishna	76	Nandigama	Devineni Uma Maheswara Rao	TDP	63,445	Vasantha Nageswara Rao	INC	59,160	4,285	
Krishna	77	Vijayawada West	Shaik Nasar Vali	CPI	62,365	M. K. Baig	TDP	35,846	26,519	
Krishna	78	Vijayawada East	Vangaveeti Radha Krishna	INC	59,340	Yeleswarapu Naga Kanaka Jagan Mohan Raju	BJP	32,629	26,711	
Krishna	79	Kankipadu	Devineni Rajasekhar (Nehru)	INC	103,181	Gadde Ramamohan	TDP	85,656	17,525	
Krishna	80	Mylavaram	Chanamolu Venkata Rao	INC	77,383	Vadde Sobhanadreeswara Rao	TDP	63,966	13,417	
Krishna	81	Tiruvuru (SC)	Koneru Ranga Rao	INC	77,124	Nallagatla Swamy Das	TDP	60,355	16,769	
Krishna	82	Nuzvid	Meka Venkata Pratap Apparao	INC	80,706	Kotagiri Hanumantha Rao	TDP	61,498	19,208	
Krishna	83	Gannavaram	Muddaraboina Venkateswara Rao	IND	42,444	D. V. Balavardhanarao	TDP	40,209	2,235	
Krishna	84	Vuyyur	Kolusu Parthasarathy	INC	49,337	Chalasani Venkateswara Rao	TDP	43,023	6,314	
Krishna	85	Gudivada	Kodali Nani	TDP	57,843	Eswar Kumar Katari	INC	48,981	8,862	
Krishna	86	Mudinepalli	Pinnamaneni Venkateswara Rao	INC	50,834	Yerneni Sitadevi	TDP	39,040	11,794	
Krishna	87	Kaikalur	Yerneni Raja Ramachandar	INC	54,140	Kammili Vital Rao	TDP	52,084	2,056	
Krishna	88	Malleswaram	Buragadda Veda Vyas	INC	65,300	Kagitha Venkata Rao	TDP	41,499	23,801	
Krishna	89	Bandar	Perni Nani	INC	67,570	Nandakuditi Narasimha Rao	TDP	36,269	31,301	
Krishna	90	Nidumolu (SC)	Paturu Ramaiah	CPI(M)	45,114	Uppuleti Kalpana	TDP	41,925	3,188	
Krishna	91	Avanigadda	Mandali Buddha Prasad	INC	41,511	Buragadda Ramesh Naidu	TDP	33,029	8,482	
Guntur	92	Kuchinapudi	Mopidevi Venkata Ramana Rao	INC	46,311	Kesana Sankara Rao	TDP	37,770	8,541	
Guntur	93	Repalle	Devineni Mallikharjuna Rao	INC	50,190	Mummaneni Venkatasubbaiah	TDP	32,849	17,341	
Guntur	94	Vemuru	Satishpaul Raj	INC	52,756	Alapati Rajendra Prasad	TDP	44,035	8,721	
Guntur	95	Duggirala	Gudibandi Venkata Reddy	INC	54,257	Chandu Sambasiva Rao	TDP	42,461	11,796	
Guntur	96	Tenali	Nadendla Manohar	INC	53,409	Gogineni Uma	TDP	40,803	12,606	
Guntur	97	Ponnur	Dhulipalla Narendra Kumar	TDP	51,288	Mannava Raja Kishore	INC	42,243	9,045	
Guntur	98	Bapatla	Gade Venkata Reddy	INC	61,370	Manthena Anantha Varma	TDP	45,801	15,569	
Guntur	99	Prathipadu (Guntur)	Ravi Venkata Ramana	INC	52,403	Makineni Pedarattaiah	TDP	47,479	4,924	
Guntur	100	Guntur-I	Shaik Subani	INC	70,353	S. M. Ziauddin	TDP	34,389	35,964	
Guntur	101	Guntur-II	Tadisetti Venkat Rao	INC	50,658	T. V. Rao	TDP	35,354	15,034	
Guntur	102	Mangalagiri	Murugudu Hanumantha Rao	INC	41,980	Thammisetty Janaki Devi	BJP	36,599	5,381	
Guntur	103	Tadikonda (SC)	Dokka Manikya Vara Prasad	INC	63,411	J. R. Pushpa Raju	TDP	47,405	16,006	
Guntur	104	Sattenapalli	Veeram Venkateswara Reddy	INC	74,467	Kallam Anji Reddy	TDP	50,057	24,410	
Guntur	105	Pedakurapadu	Kanna Lakshminarayana	INC	76,912	Doppalapudi Ravathi Rosaiah	TDP	54,791	22,121	
Guntur	106	Gurzala	Janga Krishna Murthy	INC	73,358	Yarapathineni Srinivasa Rao	TDP	65,015	8,343	
Guntur	107	Macherla	Pinelli Lakshma Reddy	INC	70,354	Julakanti Brahmananda Reddy	TDP	39,688	30,666	
Guntur	108	Vinukonda	Makkena Mallikarjuna Rao	INC	71,979	Gonuguntla Leelavathi	TDP	64,230	7,749	
Guntur	109	Narasaraopet	Kasu Krishna Reddy	INC	79,568	Kodela Siva Prasada Rao	TDP	64,073	15,495	
Guntur	110	Chilakaluripet	Marri Rajashekar	IND	57,214	Prathipati Pulla Rao	TDP	57,002	212	
Prakasam	111	Chirala	Konijeti Rosaiah	INC	73,497	Paleti Rama Rao	TDP	43,420	30,077	
Prakasam	112	Parchur	Daggubati Venkateswara Rao	INC	54,987	Chenchu Garataiah Bachina	TDP	39,441	15,546	
Prakasam	113	Martur	Gottipati Ravi Kumar	INC	64,983	Gottipati Narasimha Rao	TDP	51,177	13,806	
Prakasam	114	Addanki	Karanam Balaram Krishna Murthy	TDP	56,356	Jagarlamudi Raghava Rao	INC	53,566	2,790	
Prakasam	115	Ongole	Balineni Srinivasa Reddy	INC	72,380	Sidda Raghava Rao	TDP	48,209	24,171	
Prakasam	116	Santhanuthalapadu (SC)	Dara Sambaiah	INC	66,464	Palaparthi David Raju	TDP	50,829	15,635	
Prakasam	117	Kandukur	Manugunta Maheedhar Reddy	INC	67,207	Divi Siva Ram	TDP	59,382	7,879	
Prakasam	118	Kanigiri	Erigineni Thirupathi Naidu	INC	53,010	Mukku Kasi Reddy	TDP	43,735	9,275	
Prakasam	119	Kondepi	Pothula Rama Rao	INC	64,074	Damacharla Anjaneyulu	TDP	55,202	8,872	
Prakasam	120	Cumbum	Vudumula Srinivasulu Reddy	INC	52,738	Chegireddy Linga Reddy	TDP	45,116	7,622	
Prakasam	121	Darsi	Buchepalli Subba Reddy	IND	50,431	Kadiri Babu Rao	TDP	48,021	2,410	
Prakasam	122	Markapur	Kunduru Pedda Konda Reddy	INC	58,108	Kandula Narayana Reddy	TDP	37,370	20,738	
Prakasam	123	Giddalur	Pagadala Ramaiah	INC	50,987	Pidathala Sai Kalpana Reddy	TDP	31,505	19,482	
Nellore	124	Udayagiri	Mekapati Chandrasekhar Reddy	INC	55,076	Kambham Vijayarami Reddy	TDP	32,001	23,075	
Nellore	125	Kavali	Magunta Parvathamma	INC	68,167	Madala Janakiram	TDP	47,018	21,149	
Nellore	126	Allur	Katamreddy Vishnuvardhan Reddy	INC	60,760	Beeda Masthan Rao	TDP	47,388	13,372	
Nellore	127	Kovur	Polamreddy Srinivasulu Reddy	INC	45,270	Nallapareddy Prasannakumar Reddy	TDP	44,790	480	
Nellore	128	Atmakur (Nellore)	Kommi Lakshmaiah Naidu	IND	43,347	Bollineni Krishnaiah	BJP	38,950	4,397	
Nellore	129	Rapur	Anam Ramanarayana Reddy	INC	67,607	Yellasiri Srinivasulu Reddy	TDP	61,769	5,838	
Nellore	130	Nellore	Anam Vivekananda Reddy	INC	67,635	Sannapareddy Suresh Reddy	BJP	45,863	21,772	
Nellore	131	Sarvepalli	Adala Prabhakara Reddy	INC	67,783	Somireddy Chandra Mohan Reddy	TDP	60,158	7,625	
Nellore	132	Gudur (SC)	Patra Prakasa Rao	INC	63,809	Vukkala Rajeswaramma	TDP	53,978	8,831	
Nellore	133	Sulurpet (SC)	Nelavala Subramanyam	INC	56,939	Parasa Venkata Ratnaiah	TDP	48,124	8,815	
Nellore	134	Venkatagiri	Nedurumalli Rajalakshmi	INC	57,830	Velugoti Bhaskar Sai Krishna Yachendra	TDP	51,135	6,695	
Chittoor	135	Srikalahasti	S. C. V. Naidu	INC	69,262	Bojjala Gopala Krishna Reddy	TDP	56,184	13,078	
Chittoor	136	Satyavedu (SC)	K. Narayanaswamy	INC	68,323	Naramalli Sivaprasad	TDP	36,831	31,492	
Chittoor	137	Nagari	Reddyvari Chenga Reddy	INC	65,561	Roja Selvamani	TDP	59,867	5,694	
Chittoor	138	Puttur	Gali Muddu Krishnama Naidu	INC	65,788	Kandari Sankar Reddy	TDP	35,837	29,951	
Chittoor	139	Vepanjeri (SC)	Gummadi Kuthuhalam	INC	58,350	O. Chandramma	TDP	46,768	11,582	
Chittoor	140	Chittoor	A. S. Manohar	TDP	58,788	C. K. Jayachandra Reddy	IND	54,900	3,888	
Chittoor	141	Palmaner (SC)	L. Lalitha Kumari	TDP	67,861	M. Thippeswamy	INC	67,124	737	
Chittoor	142	Kuppam	N. Chandrababu Naidu	TDP	98,123	M. Subramanyam Reddy	INC	38,535	59,588	
Chittoor	143	Punganur	N. Amarnath Reddy	TDP	71,492	R. Reddappa Reddy	INC	62,318	9,174	
Chittoor	144	Madanpalle	Dommalapati Ramesh	TDP	52,988	Gangarapu Ramdas Chowdary	IND	47,967	5,021	
Chittoor	145	Thamballapalle	Kadapa Prabhakar Reddy	INC	36,291	Challapalle Narshimha Reddy	BJP	35,671	620	
Chittoor	146	Vayalpad	Kiran Kumar Reddy	INC	54,144	Imtiyaz Ahmed Shaik	TDP	39,782	14,362	
Chittoor	147	Pileru	Peddireddy Ramachandra Reddy	INC	67,328	G. V. Sreenatha Reddy	TDP	45,740	21,588	
Chittoor	148	Chandragiri	Galla Aruna Kumari	INC	46,838	E. Ramanadham Naidu	TDP	32,446	14,392	
Chittoor	149	Tirupathi	M. Venkataramana	INC	91,863	N. V. Prasad	TDP	52,768	39,095	
Kadapa	150	Kodur (SC)	Gunti Venkateswara Prasad	INC	55,135	Yerrathota Jayamma	TDP	38,713	16,422	
Kadapa	151	Rajampet	Konduru Prabhavatamma	INC	54,246	Pasupuleti Brahmaiah	TDP	30,579	23,667	
Kadapa	152	Rayachoti	Sugavasi Palakondrayudu	TDP	51,026	Minnamreddy Sreelatha	INC	47,482	3,544	
Kadapa	153	Lakkireddipalli	Gadikota Mohan Reddy	INC	51,816	Reddeppagari Ramesh Kumar Reddy	TDP	38,764	13,052	
Kadapa	154	Cuddapa	Ahamadulla Mohammad Syed	INC	75,615	Kandula Sivananda Reddy	TDP	54,959	20,656	
Kadapa	155	Badvel	Devasani Chinna Govinda Reddy	INC	57,023	Konireddy Vijayamma	TDP	51,742	5,281	
Kadapa	156	Mydukur	D. L. Ravindra Reddy	INC	54,270	Settipalli Raghu Rami Reddy	TDP	46,389	7,881	
Kadapa	157	Proddatur	Nandyala Varadarajulu Reddy	INC	54,419	Mallela Linga Reddy	IND	37,390	17,029	
Kadapa	158	Jammalamadugu	Ch. Adinarayana Reddy	INC	68,463	Ponapureddy Rama Subba Reddy	TDP	45,770	22,693	
Kadapa	159	Kamalapuram	Gandluru Veera Siva Reddy	TDP	57,542	Putha Narsimha Reddy	INC	46,254	11,288	
Kadapa	160	Pulivendla	Y. S. Rajasekhara Reddy	INC	74,432	S. V. Satish Kumar Reddy	TDP	33,655	40,777	
Anantapur	161	Kadiri	Jonna Ramaiah	INC	48,104	Kandikunta Venkata Prasad	IND	39,166	8,938	
Anantapur	162	Nallamada	Kadapala Mohan Reddy	INC	51,261	Palle Raghunatha Reddy	TDP	46,566	4,695	
Anantapur	163	Gorantla	Pamudurthi Ravindra Reddy	INC	58,909	Kistappa Nimmala	TDP	58,728	181	
Anantapur	164	Hindupur	P. Ranganayakulu	TDP	68,108	B. Naveen Nischal	INC	60,745	7,363	
Anantapur	165	Madakasira	Raghu Veera Reddy	INC	74,100	Y. T. Prabhakar Reddy	TDP	58,764	15,336	
Anantapur	166	Penukonda	Paritala Ravindra	TDP	71,969	Gangula Bhanumati	INC	49,758	22,211	
Anantapur	167	Kalyandrug (SC)	B. C. Govindappa	TDP	76,363	Sugepalli Umadevi	INC	66,711	9,652	
Anantapur	168	Rayadrug	Mettu Govinda Reddy	TDP	66,188	Patil Venugopal Reddy	INC	56,083	10,105	
Anantapur	169	Uravakonda	Payyavula Keshav	TDP	55,756	Y. Vishweswara Reddy	CPI(ML)L	47,501	8,255	
Anantapur	170	Gooty	N. Neelavathi	INC	52,895	K. C. Narayana	TDP	44,183	8,712	
Anantapur	171	Singanamala (SC)	Sake Sailajanath	INC	60,029	Pamidi Shamanthakamani	TDP	51,443	8,586	
Anantapur	172	Anantapur	B. Narayana Reddy	INC	76,059	K. M. Rahamthullah	TDP	38,278	37,781	
Anantapur	173	Dhamavaram	Gonuguntla Jayalakshmamma	TDP	64,743	G. Nagi Reddy	CPI	60,956	3,787	
Anantapur	174	Tadpatri	J. C. Diwakar Reddy	INC	66,195	Kethireddy Suryapratapa Reddy	TDP	58,318	7,877	
Kurnool	175	Alur (SC)	Mulunti Mareppa	INC	39,469	Masala Padmaja	TDP	36,332	3,137	
Kurnool	176	Adoni	Y. Sai Prasad Reddy	INC	66,242	G. Krishnamma	TDP	41,501	24,741	
Kurnool	177	Yemmiganur	K. Chennakesava Reddy	INC	78,586	B. V. Mohan Reddy	TDP	60,213	18,373	
Kurnool	178	Kodumur (SC)	M. Sikhamani	INC	59,730	Akepogu Prabhakar Rao	TDP	42,617	17,113	
Kurnool	179	Kurnool	M. Abdul Gafoor	CPI(M)	54,125	T. G. Venkatesh	TDP	51,652	2,473	
Kurnool	180	Pattikonda	S. V. Subba Reddy	TDP	45,751	Pateelu Neeraja Reddy	IND	40,783	4,968	
Kurnool	181	Dhone	Kotla Sujathamma	INC	55,982	Kambalapadu Ediga Prabhakar	TDP	53,373	2,609	
Kurnool	182	Koilkuntla	Challa Ramakrishna Reddy	INC	43,771	Yarrabothula Venkata Reddy	TDP	40,668	3,103	
Kurnool	183	Allagadda	G. Prathap Reddy	INC	67,596	Bhuma Nagi Reddy	TDP	56,915	10,681	
Kurnool	184	Panyam	Katasani Rambhupal Reddy	INC	63,077	Bijjam Parthasarathi Reddy	TDP	59,495	3,582	
Kurnool	185	Nandikotkur	Gowru Charitha Reddy	INC	69,209	Byreddy Rajasekhar Reddy	TDP	55,721	13,488	
Kurnool	186	Nandyal	Silpa Mohan Reddy	INC	89,612	N. M. D. Farooq	TDP	40,935	48,677	
Kurnool	187	Atmakur (Kurnool)	Erasu Prathap Reddy	INC	63,277	Budda Sailaja	TDP	47,047	16,230	
Mahabubnagar	188	Achampet (SC)	Chikkudu Vamshi Krishna	INC	65,712	P. Ramulu	TDP	45,047	20,665	
Mahabubnagar	189	Nagarkurnool	Nagam Janardhan Reddy	TDP	57,350	Kuchakulla Damodar Reddy	TRS	55,901	1,449	
Mahabubnagar	190	Kalwakurthy	Yadma Kista Reddy	INC	76,152	Thalloju Achari	BJP	54,035	22,117	
Mahabubnagar	191	Shadnagar (SC)	P. Shankar Rao	INC	65,360	Bakkani Narasimhulu	TDP	54,728	10,632	
Mahabubnagar	192	Jadcherla	Charlakola Laxma Reddy	TRS	63,480	M. Chandra Shekhar	TDP	45,099	18,381	
Mahabubnagar	193	Mahbubnagar	Puli Veeranna	IND	63,110	P. Chandra Sekhar	TDP	43,828	19,282	
Mahabubnagar	194	Wanaparthy	G. Chinna Reddy	INC	64,239	Kandoor Lavanya	TDP	60,264	3,975	
Mahabubnagar	195	Kollapur	Jupally Krishna Rao	IND	49,369	Katikaneni Madhusudhana Rao	TDP	46,329	3,040	
Mahabubnagar	196	Alampur	Challa Venkatrami Reddy	IND	37,499	Vavilala Suneetha	TDP	33,252	4,247	
Mahabubnagar	197	Gadwal	D. K. Aruna	SP	80,703	Ghattu Bheemudu	TDP	42,017	38,686	
Mahabubnagar	198	Amarchinta	Salguti Swarna Sudhakar	INC	67,777	K. Dayakar Reddy	TDP	53,994	13,783	
Mahabubnagar	199	Makthal	Chittem Narsi Reddy	INC	55,375	Nagurao Namaji	TDP	53,019	2,356	
Mahabubnagar	200	Kodangal	Gurunath Reddy	INC	61,452	N. M. Anuradha	TDP	55,487	5,965	
Ranga Reddy	201	Tandur	Malkud Narayan Rao	INC	69,945	P. Mahender Reddy	TDP	56,391	13,554	
Ranga Reddy	202	Vikarabad (SC)	A. Chandrasekhar	TRS	56,647	Begari Madhura Veni	TDP	54,646	2,001	
Ranga Reddy	203	Pargi	Koppula Harishwar Reddy	TDP	59,809	Kumtom Ram Reddy	Other (Note: Telangana Congress Party–Unrecognized Political Party)	52,161	7,648	
Ranga Reddy	204	Chevella	Sabitha Indra Reddy	INC	96,995	Sama Bhoopal Reddy	TDP	55,410	41,585	
Ranga Reddy	205	Ibrahimpatnam (SC)	Masku Narasimha	CPI(M)	67,288	Narra Ravi Kumar	TDP	54,481	12,807	
Hyderabad	206	Musheerabad	Nayani Narasimha Reddy	TRS	53,553	K. Laxman	BJP	53,313	240	
Hyderabad	207	Himayatnagar	G. Kishan Reddy	BJP	55,338	Govind Giri	TRS	23,577	31,761	
Hyderabad	208	Sanathnagar	Marri Shashidhar Reddy	INC	51,710	S. Rajeshwar	TDP	42,164	9,546	
Hyderabad	209	Secunderabad	T. Padma Rao Goud	TRS	56,997	Talasani Srinivas Yadav	TDP	53,930	3,067	
Hyderabad	210	Khairatabad	P. Janardhan Reddy	INC	210,325	K. Vijayarama Rao	TDP	171,226	39,099	
Hyderabad	211	Secunderabad Cantt. (SC)	G. Sayanna	TDP	89,684	Ravula Anjaiah	TRS	74,652	15,032	
Hyderabad	212	Malakpet	Malreddy Ranga Reddy	INC	138,907	Manchireddy Kishan Reddy	BJP	115,549	23,358	
Hyderabad	213	Asafnagar	Danam Nagender	TDP	34,001	Mohammed Abdul Muneem Haji Sait	AIMIM	31,227	2,774	
Hyderabad	214	Maharajgunj	M. Mukesh	INC	31,875	Prem Singh Rathore	BJP	22,317	9,558	
Hyderabad	215	Karwan	Mohammed Muqtada Khan	AIMIM	84,181	Baddam Bal Reddy	BJP	61,956	22,235	
Hyderabad	216	Yakutpura	Mumtaz Ahmed Khan	AIMIM	50,194	Mohammed Abdul Gani	MBT	15,578	34,616	
Hyderabad	217	Chandrayangutta	Akbaruddin Owaisi	AIMIM	58,513	Khayam Khan	MBT	11,944	11,944	
Hyderabad	218	Charminar	Syed Ahmed Pasha Quadri	AIMIM	130,879	Tayyaba Tasleem	TDP	22,958	107,921	
Ranga Reddy	219	Medchal	Devender Goud	TDP	172,916	Komma Reddy Surender Reddy	TRS	147,209	25,707	
Medak	220	Siddipet	K. Chandrashekar Rao	TRS	74,287	Jilla Srinivas	TDP	29,619	44,668	
Medak	221	Dommat	Solipeta Ramalinga Reddy	TRS	66,227	Cheruku Muthyam Reddy	TDP	41,098	25,129	
Medak	222	Gajwel (SC)	J. Geeta Reddy	INC	71,955	D. Durgaiah	TDP	47,695	24,260	
Medak	223	Narsapur	Vakiti Sunitha Laxma Reddy	INC	60,957	Chilumula Madan Reddy	TDP	35,140	25,817	
Medak	224	Sangareddy	Jagga Reddy	TRS	71,158	K. Satyanarayana	BJP	53,482	17,676	
Medak	225	Zahirabad	Mohammed Fareeduddin	INC	60,273	Chengal Baganna	TDP	47,410	12,863	
Medak	226	Narayankhed	Shetkar Suresh Kumar	INC	66,453	M. Vijayapal Reddy	TDP	61,704	4,749	
Medak	227	Medak	Patlolla Shashidhar Reddy	JP	43,369	Kranam Umadevi	TDP	38,920	4,449	
Medak	228	Ramayampet	Padma Devender Reddy	TRS	74,327	Mynampally Vani	TDP	44,120	30,207	
Medak	229	Andole (SC)	Damodar Raja Narasimha	INC	67,703	Babu Mohan	TDP	42,857	24,846	
Nizamabad	230	Balkonda	K. R. Suresh Reddy	INC	54,054	Vasanth Reddy	TDP	41,113	12,941	
Nizamabad	231	Armur	Sanigaram Santosh Reddy	TRS	59,274	Aleti Annapurna	TDP	52,719	6,555	
Nizamabad	232	Kamareddy	Mohammed Ali Shabbir	INC	80,233	Vuppunoothula Muralidhar Goud	BJP	27,470	52,763	
Nizamabad	233	Yellareddy	Eanugu Ravinder Reddy	TRS	40,548	Bogudameedi Janardhan Goud	IND	30,281	10,267	
Nizamabad	234	Jukkal (SC)	Soudagar Gangaram	INC	50,375	Hanmanth Sindhe	TDP	49,106	1,269	
Nizamabad	235	Banswada	Bajireddy Goverdhan	INC	61,819	Pocharam Srinivas Reddy	TDP	49,471	12,348	
Nizamabad	236	Bodhan	P. Sudarshan Reddy	INC	49,841	Abdul Khader	TDP	32,890	16,951	
Nizamabad	237	Nizamabad	D. Srinivas	INC	69,001	Satish Pawar	TDP	40,836	28,165	
Nizamabad	238	Dichpalli	Gaddam Ganga Reddy	TRS	65,434	Mandava Venkateshwara Rao	TDP	38,790	2,644	
Adilabad	239	Mudhole	Narayan Rao	TRS	78,175	Mashettiwwar Jagadish	BJP	36,613	41,562	
Adilabad	240	Nirmal	Allola Indrakaran Reddy	INC	70,249	V. Satyanarayan Goud	TDP	45,671	24,578	
Adilabad	241	Boath (ST)	Soyam Bapu Rao	TRS	53,940	Godam Nagesh	TDP	41,567	12,373	
Adilabad	242	Adilabad	Chilukuri Ramchander Reddy	INC	74,765	Jogu Ramanna	TDP	54,838	19,837	
Adilabad	243	Khanapur (ST)	Ajmeera Govind Naik	TRS	50,763	Ramesh Rathod	TDP	41,572	9,191	
Adilabad	244	Asifabad (SC)	Amurajula Sridevi	TDP	45,817	Gunda Mallesh	CPI	40,365	5,452	
Adilabad	245	Luxettipet	Nadipelli Diwakar Rao	INC	60,530	Gone Hanumantha Rao	TDP	60,364	166	
Adilabad	246	Sirpur	Koneru Konappa	INC	55,938	Palavi Rajya Lakshmi	TDP	51,619	4,319	
Adilabad	247	Chennur (SC)	Gaddam Vinod Kumar	INC	77,240	Boda Janardhan	TDP	40,459	36,781	
Karimnagar	248	Manthani	D. Sridhar Babu	INC	79,318	Somarapu Satyanarayana	TDP	36,758	42,560	
Karimnagar	249	Peddapalle	Geetla Mukunda Reddy	TRS	59,697	Birudu Rajamallu	JP	35,933	23,764	
Karimnagar	250	Mydaram (SC)	Koppula Eshwar	TRS	104,941	Malem Mallesham	TDP	48,378	56,563	
Karimnagar	251	Huzurabad	V. Lakshmikantha Rao	TRS	81,121	E. Peddi Reddy	TDP	36,451	44,670	
Karimnagar	252	Kamalapur	Etela Rajender	TRS	68,393	Muddasani Damodar Reddy	TDP	48,774	19,619	
Karimnagar	253	Indurthi	Chada Venkat Reddy	CPI	35,437	Bomma Venkateshwar	IND	24,377	11,060	
Karimnagar	254	Karimnagar	Meneni Satyanarayana	INC	61,148	Gandra Nalini	TDP	44,571	16,577	
Karimnagar	255	Choppadandi	Sana Maruthi	TDP	45,211	Koduri Satyanarayana Goudu	INC	41,096	4,115	
Karimnagar	256	Jagtial	T. Jeevan Reddy	INC	63,812	L. Ramana	TDP	55,678	8,134	
Karimnagar	257	Buggaram	Juvvadi Rathnakar Rao	INC	54,897	Shikari Vishwanatham	TDP	45,109	9,788	
Karimnagar	258	Metpalli	Kommoreddi Ramulu	JP	31,917	Kalvakuntla Vidya Sagar Rao	IND	26,319	5,598	
Karimnagar	259	Sircilla	Chennamaneni Rajeshwara Rao	TDP	64,003	Regulapati Papa Rao	TRS	46,995	17,008	
Karimnagar	260	Narella (SC)	Lingaiah Kashipet	TRS	58,702	Suddala Devaiah	TDP	44,429	14,273	
Warangal	261	Cheriyal	Kommuri Pratap Reddy	TRS	60,350	Mandala Sriramulu	TDP	35,055	25,250	
Warangal	262	Jangaon	Ponnala Lakshmaiah	INC	60,041	Adaboina Basava Reddy	TDP	36,748	23,293	
Warangal	263	Chennur	Dugyala Srinivasa Rao	TRS	67,912	Nemarugommula Sudhakar Rao	TDP	59,821	8,091	
Warangal	264	Dornakal	Dharamsoth Redya Naik	INC	72,669	Banoth Jayanth Nath	TDP	53,529	19,140	
Warangal	265	Mahbubabad	Vem Narender Reddy	TDP	50,373	Jannareddy Bharath Chand Reddy	JP	47,110	3,263	
Warangal	266	Narsampet	Kammampati Laxma Reddy	TRS	76,566	Revuri Prakash Reddy	TDP	61,658	14,908	
Warangal	267	Waradhanapet	Errabelli Dayakar Rao	TDP	73,022	Muthireddy Yadagiri Reddy	JP	47,928	25,094	
Warangal	268	Ghanpur Station (SC)	Gunde Vijaya Rama Rao	TRS	63,221	Kadiyam Srihari	TDP	43,501	19,720	
Warangal	269	Warangal	Basavaraju Saraiah	INC	78,912	Gundu Sudha Rani	TDP	37,745	41,167	
Warangal	270	Hanamkonda	Mandadi Satyanarayana Reddy	TRS	60,730	Dasyam Vinaya Bhasskar	IND	57,582	3,148	
Warangal	271	Shyampet	Konda Surekha	INC	72,454	Gujjula Premendar Reddy	BJP	28,430	44,024	
Warangal	272	Parkal (SC)	Bandari Shara Rani	TRS	71,773	Dommati Sambaiah	TDP	37,176	34,597	
Warangal	273	Mulug (ST)	Podem Veeraiah	INC	55,701	Danasari Anasuya (Seethakka)	TDP	41,107	14,594	
Khammam	274	Bhadrachalam (ST)	Sunnam Rajaiah	CPI(M)	64,888	Sode Ramaiah	TDP	50,303	14,585	
Khammam	275	Burgampahad (ST)	Payam Venkateswarlu	CPI	68,080	Thati Venkateswarulu	TDP	52,279	15,801	
Khammam	276	Kothagudem	Vanama Venkateswara Rao	INC	76,333	Koneru Nageswara Rao	TDP	48,561	27,772	
Khammam	277	Sathupalli	Jalagam Venkat Rao	INC	89,986	Thummala Nageswara Rao	TDP	80,450	9,536	
Khammam	278	Madhira	Katta Venkata Narasaiah	CPI(M)	71,405	Kondabala Koteswara Rao	INC	49,972	21,433	
Khammam	279	Palair (SC)	Sambhani Chandrasheker	INC	78,422	Sandra Venkata Veeraiah	TDP	54,500	23,922	
Khammam	280	Khammam	Tammineni Veerabhadram	CPI(M)	46,505	Balasani Laxminarayana	TDP	36,685	9,820	
Khammam	281	Shujatnagar	Ramreddy Venkata Reddy	INC	59,690	Potla Madhavi	TDP	53,051	6,639	
Khammam	282	Yellandu (ST)	Gummadi Narsaiah	IND	45,956	Kalpanabai Malothu	TDP	34,030	11,926	
Nalgonda	283	Tungaturthi	Ramreddy Damodar Reddy	INC	68,821	Sankineni Venkateshwar Rao	TDP	55,637	13,184	
Nalgonda	284	Suryapet (SC)	Vedas Venkaiah	INC	66,679	Palavai Rajani Kumari	TDP	55,161	11,518	
Nalgonda	285	Kodad	N. Uttam Kumar Reddy	INC	88,178	Venepalli Chander Rao	TDP	64,391,	23,787	
Nalgonda	286	Miryalguda	Julakanti Ranga Reddy	CPI(M)	81,014	Poreddy Chandrashekar Reddy	TDP	49,859	31,155	
Nalgonda	287	Chalakurthi	Kunduru Jana Reddy	INC	80,116	Gundeboina Ram Murthy Yadav	TDP	51,344	28,772	
Nalgonda	288	Nakrekal	Nomula Narsimhaiah Yadav	CPI(M)	66,999	Katikam Sathaiah Goud	TDP	42,777	24,222	
Nalgonda	289	Nalgonda	Komatireddy Venkat Reddy	INC	69,818	Gutha Sukender Reddy	TDP	47,080	22,738	
Nalgonda	290	Ramannapet	Uppunuthula Purushottam Reddy	INC	52,929	Dasari Mallesham	BJP	31,039	21,890	
Nalgonda	291	Alair (SC)	Kududula Nagesh	TRS	66,010	Motkupalli Narasimhulu	TDP	41,185	24,825	
Nalgonda	292	Bhongir	Uma Madhava Reddy	TDP	66,602	Ale Narendra	TRS	49,066	17,536	
Nalgonda	293	Mungode	Palla Venkat Reddy	CPI	55,252	Chiluveru Kashinath	TDP	43,967	11,285	
Nalgonda	294	Deverkonda (ST)	Ramavath Ravindra Kumar	CPI	61,748	Vadthya Shakru Naik	TDP	44,561	17,187	

== Bypolls ==
After the election, the TRS which had allied with the INC, became unhappy with the delay in forming a separate Telangana state. In 2006, it withdrew support from the United Progressive Alliance at the Centre. In March 2008, TRS leaders including K. Chandrasekhar Rao, resigned from the Lok Sabha, and 16 TRS MLAs resigned from the state assembly. By-elections were held in May 2008 and TRS won only some of the seats it had vacated, with INC and TDP winning the rest.

District	Constituency		Winner				Runner Up				Margin
District	No.	Name	Candidate	Party	Votes	%	Candidate	Party	Votes	%	Margin
Hyderabad	213	Asafnagar	Mohammad Moazam Khan	AIMIM	25,719	36.58	Danam Nagender	INC	23,609	33.58	2,110
Hyderabad	213	Asafnagar	Bypoll held on 13 October 2004 following the resignation of the incumbent member Danam Nagender from Telugu Desam Party as MLA.								
Medak	220	Siddipet	T. Harish Rao	TRS	64,376	55.76	Cheruku Muthyam	TDP	39,547	34.25	24,829
Medak	220	Siddipet	Bypoll held on 13 October 2004 following the resignation of the incumbent member K. Chandrashekhar Rao from Telangana Rashtra Samithi as MLA.								
Mahabubnagar	199	Makthal	Chittem Rammohan Reddy	INC	64,878	65.61	Sugappa	IND	24,799	25.08	40,079
Mahabubnagar	199	Makthal	Bypoll held on 10 December 2005 following the death of the incumbent member Chittem Narsi Reddy from Indian National Congress on 15 August 2005.								
Visakhapatnam	24	Visakhapatnam-I	Dronamraju Rao	INC	34,866	59.21	Abdul Rahaman Shaik	TDP	20,716	35.18	14,150
Visakhapatnam	24	Visakhapatnam-I	Bypoll held on 19 February 2006 following the death of the incumbent member Dronamraju Satyanarayana from Indian National Congress on 28 December 2005.								
Vizianagaram	12	Therlam	Thentu Lakshmu Naidu	TDP	55,863	74.39	Reddi Lakshmu Naidu	LSP	13,583	18.08	42,280
Vizianagaram	12	Therlam	Bypoll held on 29 May 2008 following the death of the incumbent member Thentu Jaya Prakash from Telugu Desam Party on 6 January 2008.								
Mahabubnagar	192	Jadcherla	Mallu Ravi	INC	45,175	37.43	Marati Chandra Shekar	TDP	43,069	35.68	2,106
Mahabubnagar	192	Jadcherla	Bypoll held on 29 May 2008 following the resignation of the incumbent member C. Laxma Reddy from Telangana Rashtra Samithi as MLA on 4 March 2008.								
Ranga Reddy	202	Vikarabad (SC)	Gaddam Prasad Kumar	INC	67,814	53.99	B. Sanjeeva Rao	TDP	38,922	30.98	28,892
Ranga Reddy	202	Vikarabad (SC)	Bypoll held on 29 May 2008 following the resignation of the incumbent member A. Chandra Shekar from Telangana Rashtra Samithi as MLA on 4 March 2008.								
Hyderabad	206	Musheerabad	T. Manemma	INC	34,795	31.22	Dr. K. Laxman	BJP	32,720	29.36	2,075
Hyderabad	206	Musheerabad	Bypoll held on 29 May 2008 following the resignation of the incumbent member Nayani Narasimha Reddy from Telangana Rashtra Samithi as MLA on 4 March 2008.								
Hyderabad	209	Secunderabad	Talasani Srinivas Yadav	TDP	50,031	41.52	Pitla Krishna	INC	31,964	26.52	18,067
Hyderabad	209	Secunderabad	Bypoll held on 29 May 2008 following the resignation of the incumbent member T. Padma Rao Goud from Telangana Rashtra Samithi as MLA on 4 March 2008.								
Hyderabad	210	Khairatabad	P. Vishnuvardhan Reddy	INC	254,676	66.99	K. Srinivasa Rao	LSP	58,407	15.36	196,269
Hyderabad	210	Khairatabad	Bypoll held on 29 May 2008 following the death of the incumbent member P. Janardhan Reddy from Indian National Congress on 28 December 2007.								
Medak	220	Siddipet	T. Harish Rao	TRS	76,270	67.25	Anjaiah Bhyri	INC	17,335	15.28	58,935
Medak	220	Siddipet	Bypoll held on 29 May 2008 following the resignation of the incumbent member T. Harish Rao from Telangana Rashtra Samithi as MLA on 4 March 2008.								
Medak	221	Dommat	Solipeta Ramalinga Reddy	TRS	42,345	39.64	Cheruku Muthyam Reddy	TDP	37,203	34.82	5,142
Medak	221	Dommat	Bypoll held on 29 May 2008 following the resignation of the incumbent member Solipeta Ramalinga Reddy from Telangana Rashtra Samithi as MLA on 4 March 2008.								
Medak	228	Ramayampet	Mynampally Hanumanth Rao	TDP	49,341	38.92	Padma Devender Reddy	TRS	38,368	30.26	10,973
Medak	228	Ramayampet	Bypoll held on 29 May 2008 following the resignation of the incumbent member Padma Devender Reddy from Telangana Rashtra Samithi as MLA on 4 March 2008.								
Nizamabad	233	Yellareddy	Janardhan Goud Bogudameedi	INC	46,841	39.17	Eanugu Ravinder Reddy	TRS	34,496	28.85	12,345
Nizamabad	233	Yellareddy	Bypoll held on 29 May 2008 following the resignation of the incumbent member Enugu Ravinder Reddy from Telangana Rashtra Samithi as MLA on 4 March 2008.								
Nizamabad	238	Dichpalli	Akula Lalitha	INC	39,756	37.22	Mandava Venkateshwara Rao	TDP	31,308	29.31	8,448
Nizamabad	238	Dichpalli	Bypoll held on 29 May 2008 following the resignation of the incumbent member Gaddam Ganga Reddy from Telangana Rashtra Samithi as MLA on 4 March 2008.								
Adilabad	243	Khanapur (ST)	Suman Ramesh Rathod	TDP	40,219	37.19	Mesram Nagorao	INC	39,506	36.54	713
Adilabad	243	Khanapur (ST)	Bypoll held on 29 May 2008 following the resignation of the incumbent member Ajmeera Govind Naik from Telangana Rashtra Samithi as MLA on 4 March 2008.								
Karimnagar	250	Myadaram (SC)	Koppula Eshwar	TRS	62,123	45.60	Gummadi Kumara Swamy	INC	33,986	24.95	28,137
Karimnagar	250	Myadaram (SC)	Bypoll held on 29 May 2008 following the resignation of the incumbent member Koppula Eshwar from Telangana Rashtra Samithi as MLA on 4 March 2008.								
Karimnagar	251	Huzurabad	V. Lakshmikantha Rao	TRS	53,547	44.72	K. Sudarshan Reddy	INC	32,727	27.33	20,820
Karimnagar	251	Huzurabad	Bypoll held on 29 May 2008 following the resignation of the incumbent member V. Lakshimikantha Rao from Telangana Rashtra Samithi as MLA on 4 March 2008.								
Karimnagar	252	Kamalapur	Etela Rajender	TRS	54,092	44.53	Muddasani Damodar Reddy	TDP	31,808	26.18	22,284
Karimnagar	252	Kamalapur	Bypoll held on 29 May 2008 following the resignation of the incumbent member Etela Rajeder from Telangana Rashtra Samithi as MLA on 4 March 2008.								
Warangal	261	Cheriyal	Kommuri Pratap Reddy	TRS	45,288	47.10	Vaishali Ponnala	INC	30,824	32.06	14,464
Warangal	261	Cheriyal	Bypoll held on 29 May 2008 following the resignation of the incumbent member Kommuri Pratap Reddy from Telangana Rashtra Samithi as MLA on 4 March 2008.								
Warangal	268	Ghanpur Station (SC)	Kadiyam Srihari	TDP	39,663	35.76	Thatikonda Rajaiah	INC	35,545	32.05	4,118
Warangal	268	Ghanpur Station (SC)	Bypoll held on 29 May 2008 following the resignation of the incumbent member Gunde Vijaya Rama Rao from Telangana Rashtra Samithi as MLA on 4 March 2008.								
Nalgonda	291	Alair (SC)	Kududula Nagesh	TRS	45,867	39.27	Motkupalli Narasimhulu	TDP	41,943	35.91	3,924
Nalgonda	291	Alair (SC)	Bypoll held on 29 May 2008 following the resignation of the incumbent member Kududula Nagesh from Telangana Rashtra Samithi as MLA on 4 March 2008.								
