= Kakinada (disambiguation) =

Kakinada is a city in Andhra Pradesh, India.

Kakinada may also refer to:

- Kakinada district, a district in Andhra Pradesh, India
- Kakinada Lok Sabha constituency, a Lok Sabha Constituency in Andhra Pradesh
- Kakinada Municipal Corporation, a civic body in Kakinada, Andhra Pradesh, India
- Kakinada City Assembly constituency, a constituency of the Andhra Pradesh Legislative Assembly, India
- Kakinada Rural Assembly constituency, a constituency of the Andhra Pradesh Legislative Assembly, India
- Kakinada Kaja, an Indian sweet pastry
- Kakinada Assembly constituency, a discontinued assembly constituency of Andhra Pradesh, India
- Kakinada Rural mandal, a mandal in Andhra Pradesh, India
- Kakinada Town railway station, a railway station in Andhra Pradesh
