= Uttarapalli Assembly constituency =

Former constituency of the Andhra Pradesh legislative assembly, India

Coordinates: 17.96°N 83.18°E

Uttarapalli
- Former constituency for the Andhra Pradesh Legislative Assembly

Constituency details
- Country: India
- Region: South India
- State: Andhra Pradesh
- District: Vizianagaram
- Lok Sabha constituency: Visakhapatnam
- Established: 1978
- Abolished: 2008
- Reservation: None

Uttarapalli was a constituency of the Andhra Pradesh Legislative Assembly, India. It is one of nine constituencies in Vizianagaram district.

== Overview ==
It was a part of Vizianagaram Lok Sabha constituency along with another six Vidhan Sabha segments, namely, Rajam, Etcherla, Bobbili, Cheepurupalli, Nellimarla and Vizianagaram.

== Members of Legislative Assembly ==
- 1978 - Kakarlapudi Vijaya Raghava Satyanarayana Padmanabha Raju, Indian National Congress
- 1983 - Kolla Appala Naidu, Telugu Desam Party
- 1985 - Kolla Appala Naidu, Telugu Desam Party
- 1989 - Kolla Appala Naidu, Telugu Desam Party
- 1994 - Kolla Appala Naidu, Telugu Desam Party
- 1999 - Kolla Appala Naidu, Telugu Desam Party
- 2004 - Pudi Mangapathi Rao, Indian National Congress

== Election results ==
=== 2004 ===
2004 Andhra Pradesh Legislative Assembly election: Uttarapalli
Party	Candidate	Votes	%	±%
INC	Pudi Mangapathi Rao			
Majority				
Turnout				
INC gain from		Swing		

== See also ==
- List of constituencies of Andhra Pradesh Legislative Assembly
