= Kothuru Assembly constituency =

Constituency of the Andhra Pradesh legislative assembly, India

Coordinates: 18.70°N 84.23°E

Kothuru
- Former constituency for the Andhra Pradesh Legislative Assembly

Constituency details
- Country: India
- Region: South India
- State: Andhra Pradesh
- District: Srikakulam
- Established: 1962
- Abolished: 2008
- Reservation: None

Kothuru Assembly constituency was an ST-reserved constituency of the Andhra Pradesh Legislative Assembly, India until 2008 in Srikakulam district.

== Overview ==
It was a part of the Srikakulam Lok Sabha constituency along with another six Vidhan Sabha segments, namely, Palasa, Tekkali, Pathapatnam, Srikakulam, Amadalavalasa and Narasannapeta.

== Members of the Legislative Assembly ==
Year	Member	Political party
1962	Pothula Gunnayya	Indian National Congress
1967	M. Subbanna	Indian National Congress
1972	Viswasarai Narasimharao	Independent politician
1978	Viswasarai Narasimharao	Janata Party
1983	Nimmaka Gopalarao	Telugu Desam Party
1985	Viswasarai Narasimharao	Indian National Congress
1989	Nimmaka Gopalarao	Telugu Desam Party
1994	Nimmaka Gopalarao	Telugu Desam Party
1999	Nimmaka Gopalarao	Telugu Desam Party
2004	Gomango Janni Minathi	Indian National Congress

== Election results ==
=== 2004 ===
2004 Andhra Pradesh Legislative Assembly election: Kothuru
Party	Candidate	Votes	%	±%
INC	Gomango Janni Minathi			
NOTA	None of the Above			
Majority				
Turnout				
INC gain from		Swing		
