= Pathivada Narayanaswamy Naidu =

Indian politician

Minister of State, Andhra Pradesh
- In office 26 November 2001 – 14 May 2004

Member of Legislative Assembly, Andhra Pradesh
- In office 2014–2019
- Preceded by: Baddukonda Appalanaidu
- Succeeded by: Baddukonda Appalanaidu
- Constituency: Nellimarla

Member of Legislative Assembly, Andhra Pradesh
- In office 1983–2004
- Preceded by: Kommuru Appadu Dora
- Succeeded by: Constituency abolished
- Constituency: Bhogapuram

Personal details
- Party: Telugu Desam Party

Pathivada Narayanaswamy Naidu is an Indian politician. He was elected six times from the Bhogapuram constituency before it was reconstituted as the Nelimarla constituency.

== Personal life ==
Naidu hometown is Rellivalasa village in Poosapatirega Mandal of Vizianagaram district.

== Political life ==
Naidu started his political career with the Telugu Desam Party (TDP) at its inception in 1983. He was elected to the Andhra Pradesh Legislative Assembly from the Bhogapuram Assembly constituency six times in 1983, 1985, 1989, 1994, 1999 and 2004. He lost the 2009 election and was later elected from the Nellimarla Assembly constituency in 2014. He was defeated again in the 2019 election. Naidu served as a minister in the second cabinet of N. Chandrababu Naidu. In 2014, Naidu was elected as the Pro Tem Speaker of the Andhra Pradesh Legislative Assembly and was sworn in by then Governor E. S. L. Narasimhan.
