= V. Lakshmikantha Rao =

Indian politician

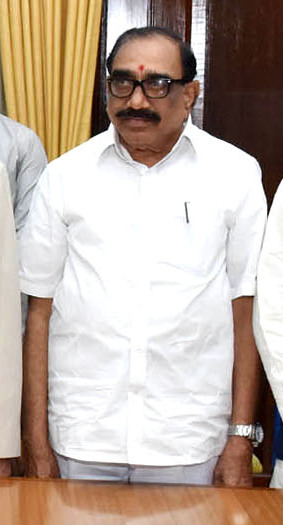
- V. Lakshmikantha Rao

MP of Rajya Sabha from Telangana
- In office 22 June 2016 – 2022
- Preceded by: Gundu Sudha Rani, TDP

Personal details
- Party: Telangana Rashtra Samithi
- Children: Vodithala Sathish Kumar

Captain V. Lakshmikantha Rao is a senior leader of the Indian regional political party Telangana Rashtra Samithi. He hails from the Karanam community. He was with the party since its formation.

He was the choice of TRS KCR for the Rajya Sabha biennial polls. On 3 June 2016 he was declared elected unopposed along with D. Srinivas of the same party.
