= Naguru Assembly constituency =

Former constituency of the Andhra Pradesh legislative assembly, India

Coordinates: 18.75°N 83.52°E

Naguru
- Former constituency for the Andhra Pradesh Legislative Assembly

Constituency details
- Country: India
- Region: South India
- State: Andhra Pradesh
- District: Vizianagaram
- Established: 1955
- Abolished: 2008
- Reservation: ST

Naguru was an ST reserved constituency of the Andhra Pradesh Legislative Assembly, India. It is one of nine constituencies in Parvathipuram Manyam district.

== Overview ==
It was a part of the Araku Lok Sabha constituency along with another six Vidhan Sabha segments, namely, Palakonda, Parvathipuram, Salur, Araku Valley, Paderu and Rampachodavaram.

== Members of the Legislative Assembly ==
Year	Member	Political party
1955	Addakula Lakshmu Naidu	Independent politician
1962	Addakula Lakshmu Naidu	Indian National Congress
1967	Sri Satrucharla Prathap Rudra Raju	Swatantra Party
1972	Vyricherla Chandra Chudamani Deo	Indian National Congress
1978	Sri Satrucharla Vijaya Rama Raju	Janata Party
1983	Sri Satrucharla Vijaya Rama Raju	Indian National Congress
1985	Sri Satrucharla Vijaya Rama Raju	Indian National Congress
1989	Sri Satrucharla Vijaya Rama Raju	Indian National Congress
1994	Sri Nimmaka Jaya Raju	Telugu Desam Party
1999	Sri Satrucharla Vijaya Rama Raju	Indian National Congress
2004	Sri Kolaka Lakshmana Murthy	Communist Party of India

== Election results ==
=== 2004 ===
2004 Andhra Pradesh Legislative Assembly election: Naguru
Party	Candidate	Votes	%	±%
CPI(M)	Sri Kolaka Lakshmana Murthy			
Majority				
Turnout				
CPI(M) gain from		Swing		

== See also ==
- List of constituencies of Andhra Pradesh Legislative Assembly
