= N. Neelavathi =

Indian politician

Nengineni Neelavathi (10 June 1977) is an Indian politician from Andhra Pradesh. She is a former Member of the Legislative Assembly in 2004 from Gooty representing the Indian National Congress. She was the youngest MLA in the assembly in 2004.

== Early life and education ==
Neelavathi was born on 10 June 1977 in Guntakal, Anantapur district, Andhra Pradesh. Her father's name is Nengineni Gadilingappa. She married K. Palaksha Kumar. She completed her post graduation in Master of Computer Applications.

== Career ==
Neelavathi became an MLA for the first time winning the 2004 Andhra Pradesh Legislative Assembly election from Gooty Assembly constituency in Anantapur district representing the Indian National Congress. She polled 52,895 votes and defeated her nearest rival, K. C. Narayana of the Telugu Desam Party, by a margin of 8,712 votes.
