= Salguti Swarna Sudhakar =

Indian politician (born 1952)

Salguti Swarna Sudhakar (born 1952) is an Indian politician from Andhra Pradesh. She was a former Member of the Legislative Assembly from Amarchinta.

Swarna is from Mahabubnagar district of Andhra Pradesh. She married Sudhakar Reddy.

Swarna became and MLA for the first time winning the 2004 Andhra Pradesh Legislative Assembly election from Amarchinta Assembly constituency representing the Indian National Congress. She polled 67,777 votes and defeated her nearest rival, K. Dayakar Reddy of the Telugu Desam Party, by a margin of 13783 votes. In the 2009 Assembly election, she contested from Devarkadra Assembly constituency lost to Seetha Dayakar Reddy of the Telugu Desam Party.
