= Therlam Assembly constituency =

Former constituency of the Andhra Pradesh legislative assembly, India

Coordinates: 18.48°N 83.50°E

Therlam
- Former constituency for the Andhra Pradesh Legislative Assembly

Constituency details
- Country: India
- Region: South India
- State: Andhra Pradesh
- District: Vizianagaram
- Established: 1978
- Abolished: 2008
- Reservation: None

Therlam Assembly constituency was an Assembly constituency of the Andhra Pradesh Legislative Assembly, India until 2008. It was one of nine constituencies in Vizianagaram district.

== Overview ==
It was a part of Araku Lok Sabha constituency along with another six Vidhan Sabha segments, namely, Palakonda, Parvathipuram, Salur, Araku Valley, Paderu and Rampachodavaram.

== Members of Legislative Assembly ==
Year	Member	Political party
1978	Vasireddi Varada Ramarao	Indian National Congress
1983	Tentu Jaya Prakash	Telugu Desam Party
1985	Tentu Jaya Prakash	Telugu Desam Party
1989	Tentu Jaya Prakash	Telugu Desam Party
1994	Tentu Jaya Prakash	Telugu Desam Party
1999	Vasireddi Varada Ramarao	Indian National Congress
2004	Tentu Jaya Prakash	Telugu Desam Party

== Election results ==
=== 2004 ===
2004 Andhra Pradesh Legislative Assembly election: Therlam
Party	Candidate	Votes	%	±%
TDP	Tentu Jaya Prakash			
Majority				
Turnout				
TDP gain from INC		Swing		

== See also ==
- List of constituencies of Andhra Pradesh Legislative Assembly
