= L. Lalitha Kumari =

Indian politician

L. Lalitha Kumari (born 1969) is an Indian politician from Andhra Pradesh. She is a former Member of the Legislative Assembly representing the Telugu Desam Party from Palamaner Assembly constituency which is reserved for Scheduled Caste community in Chittoor district .

Kumari is from Puthalapattu, Chittor, Andhra Pradesh. She completed her graduation in BA in 2011 from a college affiliated with the Dravidian University, Kuppam. She married M. Subramanyam.

Kumari was first elected as an MLA from Palamaner Assembly constituency winning the 2004 Andhra Pradesh Legislative Assembly election representing the Telugu Desam Party. She polled 67,861 votes and defeated her nearest rival, Reddeppa Reddy R of the Indian National Congress, by a margin of 737 votes.
