= Visakhapatnam-II Assembly constituency =

Defunct assembly constituency of Andhra Pradesh

Coordinates: 17.72°N 83.23°E

Visakhapatnam-II
- Former constituency for the Andhra Pradesh Legislative Assembly

Constituency details
- Country: India
- Region: South India
- State: Andhra Pradesh
- District: Visakhapatnam
- Lok Sabha constituency: Visakhapatnam
- Established: 1967
- Abolished: 2008
- Reservation: None

Visakhapatnam-II Assembly constituency was a constituency in Visakhapatnam district of Andhra Pradesh that elected representatives to the Andhra Pradesh Legislative Assembly in India. It was one of six assembly segments in the Visakhapatnam Lok Sabha constituency.

The constituency was established in 1967, as per the Delimitation Orders (1967) and abolished in 2008, as per the Delimitation Orders (2008).

== Members of the Legislative Assembly ==
Year	Member	Political party
1967	Pothina Sanyasi Rao	Communist Party of India
1972	Pothina Sanyasi Rao	Independent
1978	N. S. N. Reddy	Janata Party
1983	Eswarapu Vasudevarao	Telugu Desam Party
1985	Rajana Ramani	Telugu Desam Party
1989	T. Suryanarayana Reddy (Surreddy)	Indian National Congress
1994	Palla Simhachalam	Telugu Desam Party
1999	Penninti Varalakshmi	Telugu Desam Party
2004	Saripalli Rangaraju	Indian National Congress

== Election results ==
=== 2004 ===
2004 Andhra Pradesh Legislative Assembly election: Visakhapatnam-II
Party	Candidate	Votes	%	±%
INC	Saripalli Rangaraju			
Majority				
Turnout				
INC gain from		Swing		
