= Chintapalle Assembly constituency =

Former Legislative Assembly constituency in Andhra Pradesh, India

Coordinates: 17.87°N 82.35°E

Chintapalle
- Former constituency for the Andhra Pradesh Legislative Assembly

Constituency details
- Country: India
- Region: South India
- State: Andhra Pradesh
- District: Visakhapatnam
- Established: 1978
- Abolished: 2008
- Reservation: ST

Chintapalle was a constituency of the Andhra Pradesh Legislative Assembly, India reserved for Scheduled Tribes. It was one of 15 constituencies in Visakhapatnam district.

== Overview ==
It was part of Araku Lok Sabha constituency along with another six Vidhan Sabha segments, namely, Kurupam, Parvathipuram, Salur, Araku Valley, Palakonda and Rampachodavaram.

== Members of the Legislative Assembly ==
- 1978: Depuru Kondala Rao, Janata Party
- 1983: Korabu Venkata Ratnam, Telugu Desam Party
- 1985: MVV Satyanarayana, Telugu Desam Party
- 1989: Balaraju Pasupuleti, Indian National Congress
- 1994: Goddeti Demudu, Communist Party of India
- 1999: MVV Satyanarayana, Telugu Desam Party
- 2004: Goddeti Demudu, Indian National Congress

== Election results ==
=== 2004 ===
2004 Andhra Pradesh Legislative Assembly election: Chintapalle
Party	Candidate	Votes	%	±%
INC	Goddeti Demudu			
NOTA	None of the Above			
Majority				
Turnout				
INC gain from		Swing		

== See also ==
- List of constituencies of Andhra Pradesh Legislative Assembly
