= Ramreddy Damodar Reddy =

Indian politician (1952–2025)

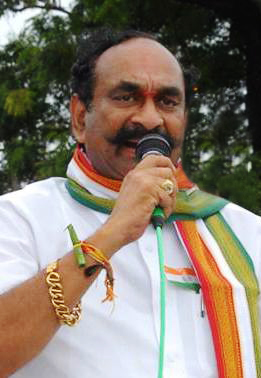

Member of Legislative Assembly Andhra Pradesh
- In office 2009–2014
- Preceded by: Vedas Venkaiah
- Succeeded by: Guntakandla Jagadish Reddy
- Constituency: Suryapet
- In office 2004–2009
- Preceded by: Sankineni Venkateswar Rao
- Succeeded by: Mothukupalli Narasimhulu
- Constituency: Thungathurthi
- In office 1985–1999
- Preceded by: Mallu Swarajyam
- Succeeded by: Sankineni Venkateswar Rao
- Constituency: Thungaturthi

Personal details
- Born: 14 September 1952 Lingala, Khammam district, Hyderabad State, India
- Died: 1 October 2025 (aged 73) Hyderabad, Telangana, India
- Party: Indian National Congress
- Children: Sarvotham Ramreddy

Ramreddy Damodar Reddy (14 September 1952 – 1 October 2025) was an Indian politician, who represented the Indian National Congress party. He won his seat at the 2009 Andhra Pradesh state assembly elections for the Suryapet constituency. Reddy died in Hyderabad on 1 October 2025, at the age of 73.

== Political career ==
Reddy was five times MLA from Thungathurthy Assembly Constituency. Later he has shifted his constituency from Thungathurthy (Assembly Constituency) to Suryapet (Assembly Constituency) in 2009. R. Damodar Reddy was a consistent and strong voice in favour of Telangana statehood among the Congress leaders. He served as minister for Ground Water Resources from 1991 to 1992 and later served as Minister for Communications and Information Technology in the first cabinet of YS Rajasekhara Reddy.

== Death ==
Ramreddy Damodar Reddy died on 1 October 2025 due to prolonged illness. His funeral was held with state honours on 4 October 2025 at his agricultural fields in Thungathurthy.
