= Manchireddy Kishan Reddy =

Indian politician

Manchireddy Kishan Reddy is a three time member of Legislative assembly having served one term in the United Andhra Pradesh Legislative Assembly from 2009 to 2014 as a member of Telugu Desam Party and later as a member of Telangana Legislative Assembly from 2014 to 2023 representing Bharat Rashtra Samithi from Ibrahimpatnam Assembly constituency.
