= Kommareddy Surender Reddy =

Indian politician (died 2020)

Andhra Pradesh Legislative Assembly
- In office 1985–1989
- Preceded by: Uma Venkatarama Reddy
- Succeeded by: Uma Venkatarama Reddy
- Constituency: Medchal

Personal details
- Born: 1941/1942
- Died: 2 February 2020 (aged 78)
- Political party: Telugu Desam Party

Kommareddy Surender Reddy (1941/1942 – 2 February 2020) was an Indian politician from Telangana belonging to Telugu Desam Party. He was a legislator of the Andhra Pradesh Legislative Assembly. He was a minister of the Government of Andhra Pradesh too.

== Biography ==
Reddy was elected as a legislator of the Andhra Pradesh Legislative Assembly from Medchal in 1985. Later, he was appointed as the Forest Minister of Government of Andhra Pradesh.

Reddy died on 2 February 2020.
