= Motkupalli Narasimhulu =

Indian politician

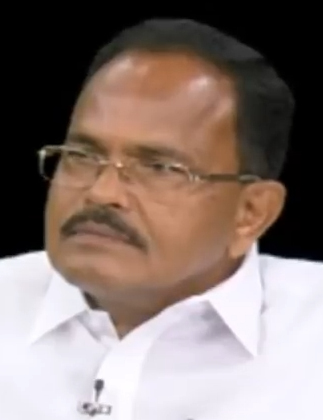
- Narasimhulu in 2018

Member of Legislative Assembly Andhra Pradesh
- In office 2009–2014
- Preceded by: Ramreddy Damodar Reddy
- Succeeded by: Gadari Kishore
- Constituency: Thungathurthi
- In office 1983–2004
- Preceded by: Sulluri Pochaiah
- Succeeded by: Dr. Nagesh
- Constituency: Alair

Personal details
- Born: Parupalle Village, Rajapet Mandal, Nalgonda district, Andhra Pradesh
- Parent: Motkupalli Narsaiah (father)
- Education: M.A., L.L.B From Osmania University

Motkupalli Narasimhulu is an Indian politician. He represented Thungathurthi constituency (SC reserved) in Nalgonda district, Telangana.

== Life ==
He was born in Nalgonda district.

He was elected as MLA from Thungathurthi (SC) (Assembly constituency) in 2009 as part of Chandrababu Naidu's government and has been elected to AP assembly 6 times.

He came out of Telugu Desam Party in 2018.
