= Dronamraju Satyanarayana =

Indian politician

Member of Parliament
- Preceded by: P. V. G. Raju
- Succeeded by: K. A. Swami
- Constituency: Visakhapatnam

Personal details
- Born: 19 December 1933
- Died: 2006 (aged 72–73)
- Party: Indian National Congress
- Spouse(s): Savitri and Parvathi
- Children: 4 sons and 2 daughters

Dronamraju Satyanarayana (19 December 1933 – 2006) was an Indian politician and member of both Lok Sabha and Rajya Sabha in Indian Parliament.

== Personal life ==
Satyanarayana was born on 19 December 1933. His father was Appala Narasihmam. His son Dronamraju Srinivasa Rao was also an INC politician.

== Political career ==
He was elected to the 6th Lok Sabha from Visakhapatnam as a member of Indian National Congress (INC) in 1977. He was elected to the Andhra Pradesh Legislative Assembly in 1980 and was Vice-President, Andhra Pradesh Congress Committee between 1987–94. He served for two sessions as a member of the Rajya Sabha, between 1988–94 and 1994–2000.

== Author ==
He was the author of Gramodyog, a history of village administration.
