= Goddeti Demudu =

Indian politician (1967–2015)

Goddeti Demudu (1967 – 26 October 2015) was an Indian politician from Andhra Pradesh. He was a former two time member of the Andhra Pradesh Legislative Assembly from the Chintapalli Assembly constituency, which is reserved for the Scheduled Tribe community, in the erstwhile Visakhapatnam district, later reorganised as ASR district. He won in 1994 and 2004, representing the Communist Party of India.

== Early life ==
Demudu is from Chintapalli, ASR district, Andhra Pradesh. He is the son of Mallaiah. He completed his graduation from BHRGH College.

== Career ==
Demudu won the Chinthapalli Assembly constituency in the 1994 Andhra Pradesh Legislative Assembly election representing the Communist Party of India. He polled 35,257 votes and defeated his nearest rival, Mottadam Veera Venkata Satyanarayana, an independent candidate, by 5,082 votes. He retained the seat for the CPI in the 2004 Andhra Pradesh Legislative Assembly election He polled 52,716 votes and beat Pasupuleti Balaraju of the Telugu Desam Party, by 1748;7 votes.

== Personal life and death ==
Demudu had a wife, with whom he had two sons and a daughter. He died on 26 October 2015 at King George Hospital, Visakhapatnam, due to jaundice. His last rites were performed at Sarbannapalem village, in Koyyuru mandal.
