= Palla Venkata Reddy =

Indian Communist politician

Palla Venkata Reddy is an Indian communist politician belonging to Communist Party of India. He is currently serving as a member of the National Secretariat of the party. He represented Munugode Assembly constituency from 2004 to 2009.
