= Eanugu Ravinder Reddy =

Indian politician

Eanugu Ravinder Reddy (born 5 April 1965) is an Indian politician from Telangana. He was a former four time Member of the Legislative Assembly from Yellareddy Assembly constituency in the erstwhile Nizamabad district of combined Andhra Pradesh. After the division of the state, he won from the same seat in 2014 Assembly election, also on Telangana Rashtra Samithi ticket.

Reddy is from Erapahad village, Tadwai mandal, Nizamabad district. He completed intermediate in 1984 at Narsapur, Medak District. Later, he did SITC in 1986 at Gandhi Medical College, Hyderabad. He joined B.Sc. but discontinued for a while and later completed the degree from Osmania University.

== Career ==
Reddy first became an MLA winning from Yellareddy Assembly constituency in the 2004 Andhra Pradesh Legislative Assembly election repreenting Telangana Rashtra Samithi. Later, he lost a by election in 2008 but won for three consecutive elections in 2009, 2010 and 2014, all on TRS ticket. He lost the 2018 election on TRS ticket and the 2023 election on a Congress ticket.
