= Kududula Nagesh =

Indian politician

Kududula Nagesh is an Indian politician, belonging to the Bharat Rashtra Samithi. Nagesh is a Member of the Andhra Pradesh Legislative Assembly, representing the Alair constituency. He was born into a poor family in Raghavapuram village near to Kolanpaka, Aler mandal, yadadri-bhongir district. His parents are Narsayya and Narsamma.

He started his 1st education in his village after he continued in Andhra Pradesh social welfare school Bhongir. He continued his education in Andhra Pradesh social welfare school Rajapet he completed his school education.
