= Bandari Shara Rani =

Indian politician (1964–2019)

Bandari Shara Rani (1964 – 2019) was an Indian politician from Telangana. She was elected as a Member of the Legislative Assembly (MLA) from the combined state in 2004. She represented Telangana Rashtra Samithi from Parkal Assembly constituency, which was reserved for Scheduled Caste community in Warangal district.

She died on 26 May 2019 due to heart attack in Hyderabad.
