= Kakinada Assembly constituency =

Defunct assembly constituency of Andhra Pradesh

Coordinates: 16.99°N 82.25°E

Kakinada
- Former constituency for the Andhra Pradesh Legislative Assembly

Constituency details
- Country: India
- Region: South India
- State: Andhra Pradesh
- District: East Godavari
- Lok Sabha constituency: Kakinada
- Established: 1951
- Abolished: 2008
- Reservation: None

Kakinada Assembly constituency was a constituency in East Godavari district of Andhra Pradesh that elected representatives to the Andhra Pradesh Legislative Assembly in India. It was one of six assembly segments in Kakinada Lok Sabha constituency.

== Members of the Legislative Assembly ==
Election	Member	Political party
1952	Chittajallu Venkata Krishna Rao	Communist Party of India
1955	Mallipudi Pallam Raju	Indian National Congress
1962	Dantu Bhaskara Rao	Indian National Congress
1967	C. V. K. Rao	Independent
1972	Akkineni Bhaskra Rao	Indian National Congress
1978	Malladi Swamy	Indian National Congress
1983	Mutha Gopala Krishna Murthy	Telugu Desam Party
1985	Mutha Gopala Krishna Murthy	Telugu Desam Party
1989	Malladi Swami	Indian National Congress
1994	Mutha Gopala Krishna Murthy	Telugu Desam Party
1999	Vanamadi Venkateswara Rao	Telugu Desam Party
2004	Mutha Gopala Krishna Murthy	Indian National Congress

== Election results ==
=== 1952 ===
1952 Madras State Legislative Assembly election: Kakinada
Party	Candidate	Votes	%	±%
CPI	Chittajallu Venkata Krishna Rao	48,371	29.86%	
CPI	Kanteti Mohana Rao	42,201	26.05%	
INC	K. Dayananda Raja	22,483	13.88%	13.88%
INC	Pamu Ramanamurthy	19,968	12.33%	12.33%
RPI	B. Vadapalli	6,854	4.23%	
Socialist Party (India)	Parapudi Rama Mohana Rao	3,442	2.12%	
RPI	P. Naayarnamoorthy	3,199	1.97%	
KMPP	Pitta Venkatesu	3,187	1.97%	
Independent	Chandramandri Venkataratnam	3,112	1.92%	
KMPP	Palavarty Bhommalingamurthy	3,102	1.91%	
Independent	Goli Venkatarayudu	2,960	1.83%	
Margin of victory		6,170	3.81%	
Turnout		1,61,997	113.83%	
Registered electors		1,42,309		
CPI win (new seat)				
