= Karne Prabhakar =

Indian politician

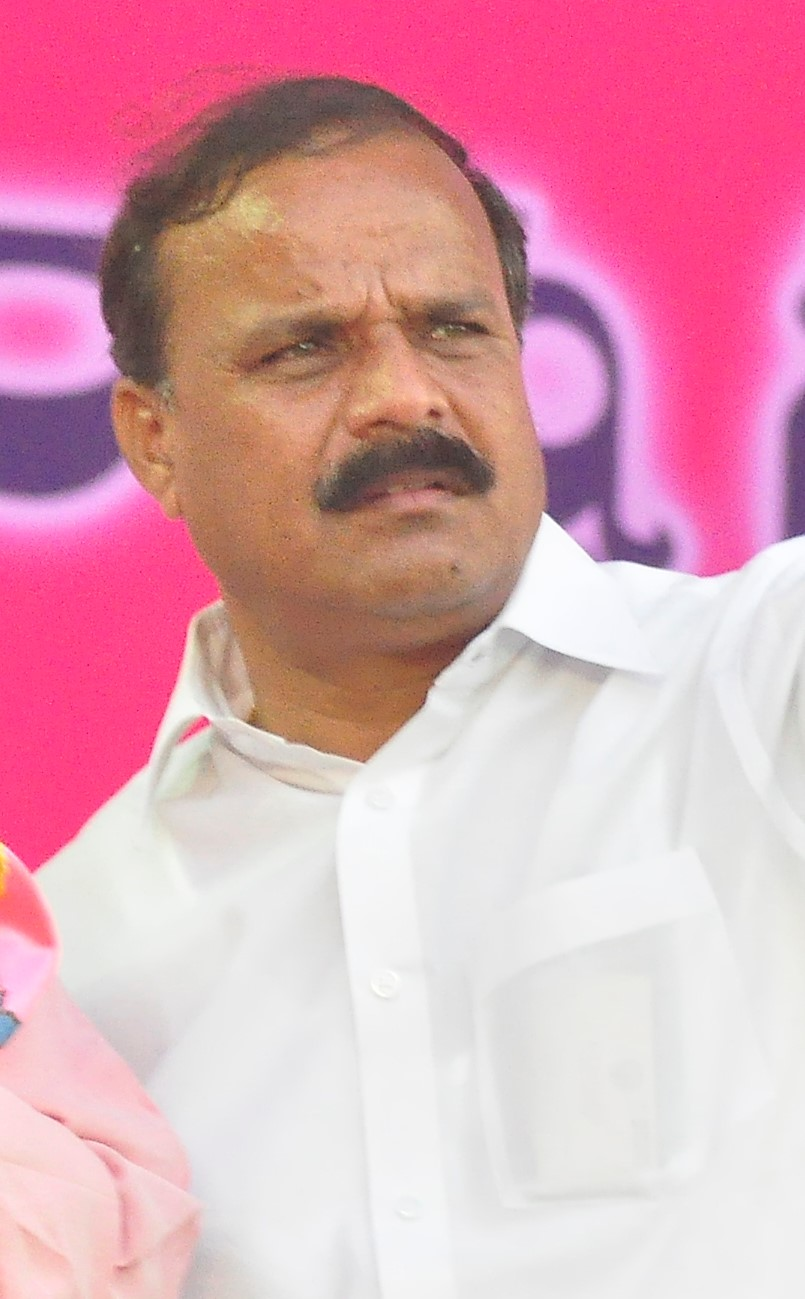
- Karne Prabhakar.jpg

Member of the Telangana Legislative Council
- In office 2014–2020
- Constituency: Nominated

Government Chief Whip of Telangana Legislative Council
- In office 7 September 2019 – 18 August 2020

Personal details
- Born: Samsthan Narayanapur
- Party: Telangana Rashtra Samithi

Karne Prabhakar (born 1970) is an Indian politician and politburo member of Telangana Rashtra Samithi.

== Early life ==
He was born in Samsthan Narayanpur, Nalgonda District. His father was a government school teacher and his mother was a farmer. He did his schooling at his village, intermediate first year in Hyderabad and second year in Bhongir. He graduated in BA from S.L.N.S. Degree College, Bhongir in 1991. He did his Diploma in Journalism. He started a students organization, Telangana Vidyarthi Sangam in college as a sympathizer for Telangana. He joined Telangana Maha Sabha, an organization for achieving Telangana State in 1996.

== Career ==
He began his career in journalism as a freelancer and worked as a contributor for Gemini TV during 1995–1996. In 1997, he ventured into the business of earth-moving excavator contracting and achieved notable success.

Political Career Inspired by K. Chandrashekar Rao’s movement for the attainment of statehood for Telangana, he joined the Telangana Rashtra Samithi (TRS) as a founding member in 2001. He served in various key positions within the party, including as Chairman of the Program Implementation Committee, State General Secretary, Politburo Member, and Official Spokesperson.

In 2004, he contested as a Member of the Legislative Assembly (MLA) candidate from the Munugodu constituency. Following the formation of Telangana State in 2014, he was elected as a Member of the Legislative Council (MLC) from the Governor's quota. In 2019, he was appointed as a Government Whip, holding a state cabinet rank.

He continues to work for the Bharat Rashtra Samithi (BRS) to this day.
