= Bhogapuram Assembly constituency =

Constituency of the Andhra Pradesh legislative assembly, India

Coordinates: 18.03°N 83.49°E

Bhogapuram
- Former constituency for the Andhra Pradesh Legislative Assembly

Constituency details
- Country: India
- Region: South India
- State: Andhra Pradesh
- District: Vizianagaram
- Established: 1955
- Abolished: 2008
- Reservation: None

Bhogapuram Assembly constituency was an Assembly constituency of the Andhra Pradesh Legislative Assembly, India until 2008. It is one of nine constituencies in Vizianagaram district.

== Overview ==
It was a part of Araku Lok Sabha constituency along with another six Vidhan Sabha segments, namely, Palakonda, Parvathipuram, Salur, Araku Valley, Paderu and Rampachodavaram.

== Members of Legislative Assembly ==
Year	Member	Political party
1955	Botcha Adinarayana	Praja Socialist Party
1962	Kommuru Appadu Dora	Indian National Congress
1967	Kommuru Appadu Dora	Indian National Congress
1972	Kommuru Appadu Dora	Indian National Congress
1978	Kommuru Appadu Dora	Indian National Congress
1983	Pathivada Narayana Swamy Naidu	Telugu Desam Party
1985	Pathivada Narayana Swamy Naidu	Telugu Desam Party
1989	Pathivada Narayana Swamy Naidu	Telugu Desam Party
1994	Pathivada Narayana Swamy Naidu	Telugu Desam Party
1999	Pathivada Narayana Swamy Naidu	Telugu Desam Party
2004	Pathivada Narayana Swamy Naidu	Telugu Desam Party

== Election results ==
=== 2004 ===
2004 Andhra Pradesh Legislative Assembly election: Bhogapuram
Party	Candidate	Votes	%	±%
TDP	Pathivada Narayana Swamy Naidu			
NOTA	None of the Above			
Majority				
Turnout				
TDP hold		Swing		

== See also ==
- List of constituencies of Andhra Pradesh Legislative Assembly
