= Gooty Assembly constituency =

Constituency of the Andhra Pradesh

Gooty Assembly constituency is a former constituency in Anantapur district of Andhra Pradesh that elected representatives to the Andhra Pradesh Legislative Assembly in India. It is one of the seven assembly segments of Anantapur Lok Sabha constituency. It was abolished in the 2008 delimitation exercise based on the recommendations of the Delimitation Commission of India constituted in 2002. In 2008, the constituency was merged in Guntakal Assembly constituency.

In 1955, there were 29 two-member constituencies and 138 single-member constituencies.

== Members of the Legislative Assembly ==
Year	Member	Political party
1955	Rajaram	Indian National Congress
1955	Sanda Narayanappa	Indian National Congress
1962	V. K. Adinarayana Reddy	Communist Party of India
1972	Duddekunta Venkata Reddy	Independent
1978	K Venkataramaiah	Indian National Congress
1983	Pati Rajagopala	Independent
1985	N. Gade Lingappa	Telugu Desam Party
1989	Arikeri Jagadish	Indian National Congress
1994	N. Gade Lingappa	Telugu Desam Party
1999	R Sainath Goud	Telugu Desam Party
2004	N. Neelavathi	Indian National Congress
