= Vedas Venkaiah =

Indian politician

Former Member Of Legislative Assembly
- Constituency: Suryapet

Personal details
- Born: 2 March 1941 (age 85) Telangana, India
- Party: Indian National Congress

Vedas Venkaiah (Telugu:వెదస్ వెంకయ్య)(born 2 March 1941) is an Indian politician and former Member of Legislative Assembly (MLA) for Suryapet Assembly Constituency under the Indian National Congress party between 2004 and 2009.

== Early life ==
Vedas Venkaiah was born on 2 March 1941 in Kudakuda, Suryapet. He completed his M.A., LL.B. in 1967–70 at Osmania University, Hyderabad. He worked and retired as Assistant Commissioner of Commercial Tax..
