= Gundu Sudha Rani =

Indian politician

Gundu Sudharani

Mayor of Warangal
- Incumbent
- Assumed office 12 May 2021

MP of Rajya Sabha for Telangana
- In office 22 June 2010 – 21 June 2016

Personal details
- Born: 28 July 1964 Warangal, Andhra Pradesh, India
- Party: Indian National Congress (2024–present)
- Other political affiliations: Bharat Rashtra Samithi (2016–2024); Telugu Desam Party (1998–2016)
- Spouse: Gundu Prabhakar

Gundu Sudharani (born 28 July 1964) is an Indian politician serving as the current mayor of Warangal since 2021. She was a Member of the Parliament of India representing Telangana in the Rajya Sabha, the upper house of the Indian Parliament. In May 2021, she was elected as the mayor of Warangal city from the Bharat Rashtra Samithi party.

== Early life ==
Gundu Sudharani was born on 28 July 1964 to Samala Narsaiah and his wife Venkatalaxmi in Warangal of present-day Telangana. She married Gundu Prabhakar 4 May 1984 and has two sons.

Sudharani has a Master of Arts in Public Administration from Madurai Kamaraj University, Madurai.

== Career ==
She was a Board Member of the Tirumala Tirupati Devasthanam from 2002 to 2004. From 2005 to 2010, she was the floor leader, Telugu Desam Party, Municipal Corporation, Warangal.

She was elected to Rajya Sabha in June 2010 and since then served as

- Member, Committee on Petroleum and Natural Gas
- Member, Committee on Papers Laid on the Table

In 2014, she was allotted to Telangana state after the bifurcation of Andhra Pradesh by draw of lots. She faced the ire of Telugu Desam Party leadership after she abstained from the vote on FDI in Rajya Sabha. Sudha Rani justified her action saying that she missed the vote for personal reasons and that there was no reason for her to collude with the ruling Congress, an allegation made by the opposition parties.

In 2016, Sudha Rani joined Bharat Rashtra Samithi.

== Service ==
Sudharani has adopted Neerukulla Village under Sansad Aadarsh Gram Yojna. The village comes in Atmakur mandal under Warangal District of Telangana State.
