= 2009 Andhra Pradesh Legislative Assembly election =

- 16 April and 23 April 2009

All 294 seats in the Andhra Pradesh Legislative Assembly 148 seats needed for a majority
- Registered: 57,892,259
- Turnout: 42,096,866 (72.72%) ▲2.76%
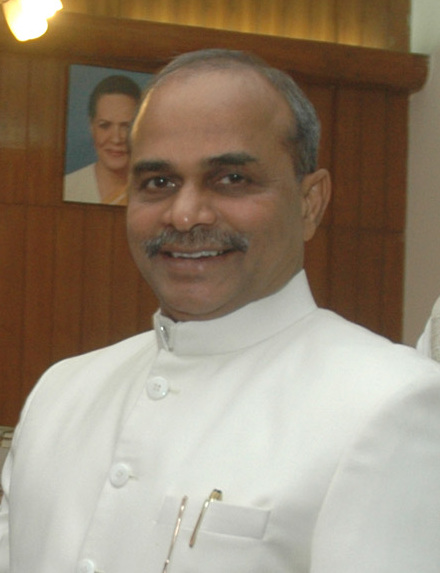

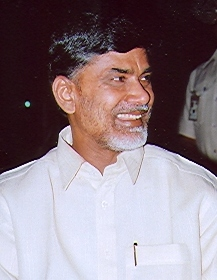

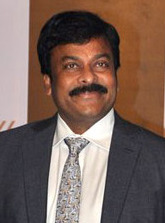

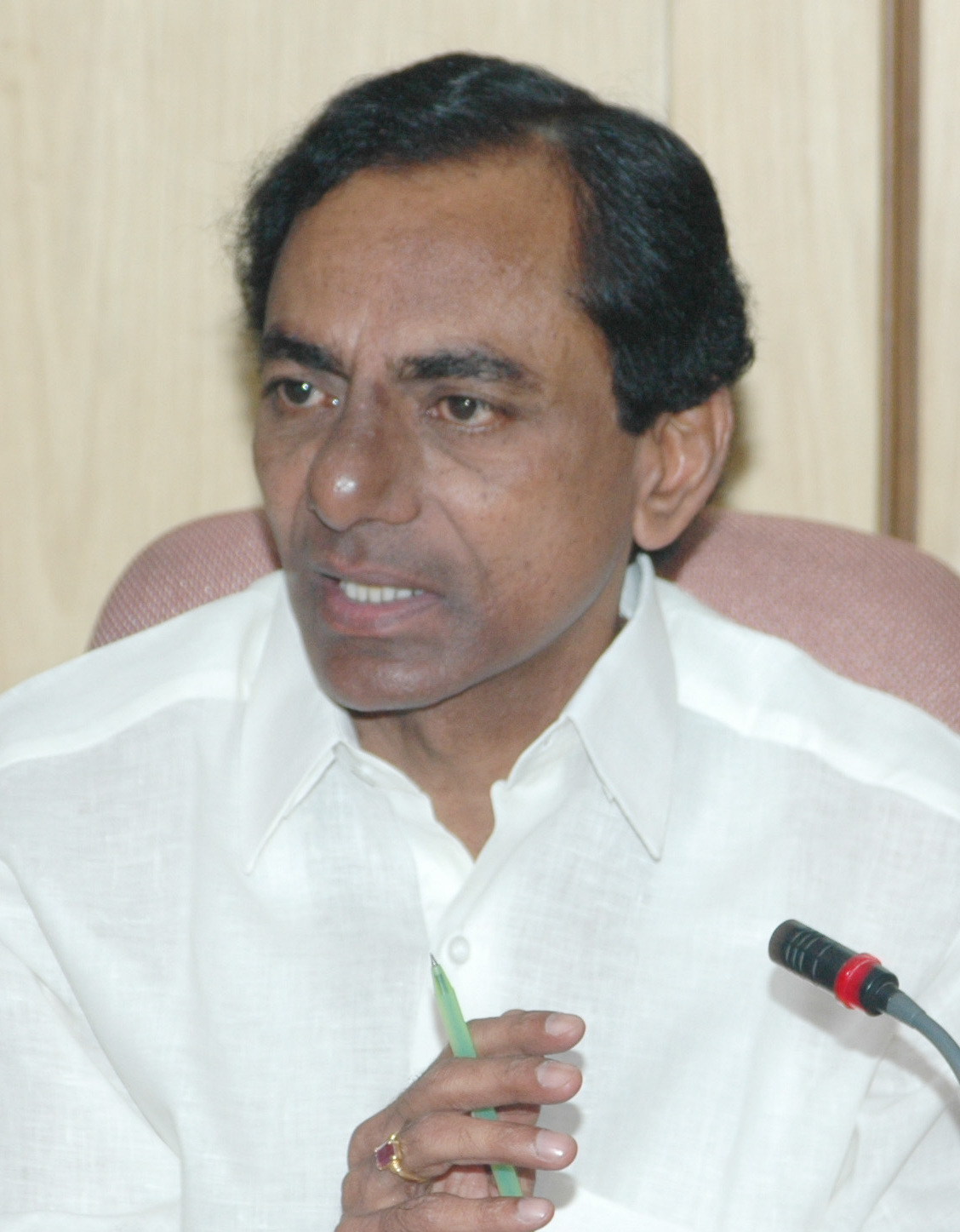
	Majority party	Minority party
Leader	Y. S. Rajasekhara Reddy	N. Chandrababu Naidu
Party	INC	TDP
Alliance	UPA	Maha Kutami
Leader since	1999	1995
Leader's seat	Pulivendula (won)	Kuppam (won)
Last election	185 seats, 38.56%	47 seats, 37.59%
Seats won	156	92
Seat change	▼29	▲45
Popular vote	15,374,448	11,826,457
Percentage	36.55%	28.12%
Swing	▼2.00%	▼9.47%
Alliance seats	156	107
	Third party	Fourth party
Leader	Chiranjeevi	K. Chandrashekar Rao
Party	PRP	TRS
Alliance	–	Maha Kutami
Leader since	2008	2001
Leader's seat	Tirupati (won), Palakollu (lost)	Did not contest (Note: Contested and won from the Mahabubnagar Lok Sabha constituency in the simultaneously conducted 2009 Indian general election in Andhra Pradesh.)
Last election	Party did not exist	26 seats, 6.68%
Seats won	18	10
Seat change	New party	▼16
Popular vote	6,863,509	1,678,906
Percentage	16.32%	3.99%
Swing	New party	▼2.69%
- Seatwise map of the results

Chief Minister before election
Y. S. Rajasekhara Reddy
INC
Chief Minister after election
Y. S. Rajasekhara Reddy
INC

The 2009 Andhra Pradesh Legislative Assembly election was held in April 2009, concurrently with the 2009 Indian general election. The elections were concluded in two phases, on 16 April 2009 and 23 April 2009. The results were declared on 16 May 2009. The incumbent Indian National Congress (INC) retained power in the Andhra Pradesh Legislative Assembly, winning 156 seats, though with a reduced majority compared to the previous term. The main opposition, the Telugu Desam Party (TDP) won 92 seats. The INC Legislature party re-elected incumbent Chief Minister Y. S. Rajasekhara Reddy as its leader, thereby re-nominating him to the post.

== Previous assembly ==
In the 2004 Andhra Pradesh Legislative Assembly election, the INC swept the state, winning 185 of the 294 seats in the Assembly. The INC's pre-poll alliance partners, the Telangana Rashtra Samithi (TRS) and the Left parties also performed well, winning 26 and 15 seats respectively, taking the United Progressive Alliance (UPA) total to 226 seats. As leader of the INC, Y. S. Rajasekhara Reddy was invited by Governor Surjit Singh Barnala to form the government.

The Government completed its full five-year term, with the tenure of the Legislative Assembly set to expire on 30 May 2009. The Election Commission of India (ECI) decided to hold the Assembly elections simultaneously with the general election. Polling in each Assembly constituency was conducted in the same phase as the election to the corresponding Parliamentary constituency under which it fell.

== Background ==
Following the 2008 Lok Sabha vote of confidence, the Left Front withdrew its support to the INC in Andhra Pradesh as well. The TDP and the TRS subsequently aligned with the Left parties as part of the national Third Front, forming an alliance in the state known as the "Maha Kutami", which translates to "Grand Alliance" in Telugu. The alliance positioned itself in opposition to both the INC, which it accused of corruption, and the Bharatiya Janata Party (BJP), which it describes as communal. During the same period, actor Chiranjeevi entered active politics by launching the Praja Rajyam Party (PRP), presenting it as a centrist alternative focused on social justice and clean governance. The PRP's entry further split the anti-INC vote.

However, the Maha Kutami faced internal challenges, including seat-sharing disputes and ideological differences among its constituent parties. After polling had concluded but before the counting of votes, the TRS shifted its stance by extending support to the National Democratic Alliance (NDA) led by BJP. The party later denied formally joining the NDA, clarifying that it had only offered external support, a move that attracted political controversy and further highlighted the fragility of pre-poll alliances during the election period.

The election revolved around several key issues. The demand for a separate Telangana state was a major factor, particularly influencing the TRS and constituencies in the Telangana region, present-day Telangana.

== Schedule ==
Poll event	Date	
Poll event	Phase 1	Phase 2
Date of announcement	2 March 2009	
Notification date	23 March 2009	28 March 2009
Last date for filing nomination	30 March 2009	4 April 2009
Scrutiny of nomination	31 March 2009	6 April 2009
Last date for withdrawal of nomination	2 April 2009	8 April 2009
Date of poll	16 April 2009	23 April 2009
Date of counting of votes	16 May 2009	
No. of constituencies	154	140

== Parties and alliances ==
Alliance/Party		Flag	Symbol	Leader	Seats contested	
Indian National Congress				D. Srinivas	294	
Maha Kutami	Telugu Desam Party			N. Chandrababu Naidu	218+7	282+10 (Note: Seat agreements within the grand alliance differed as some members contested additional seats against each other.)
Maha Kutami	Telangana Rashtra Samithi			K. Chandrashekar Rao	39+6	282+10
Maha Kutami	Communist Party of India (Marxist)			B. V. Raghavulu	13+5	282+10
Maha Kutami	Communist Party of India			K. Narayana	12+2	282+10
Bharatiya Janata Party				Bandaru Dattatreya	271	
All India Majlis-e-Ittehadul Muslimeen				Akbaruddin Owaisi	8	
Praja Rajyam Party				Chiranjeevi	288	
Lok Satta Party				Jaya Prakash Narayana	246	

== Candidates ==
District	Constituency		INC		Maha Kutami		PRP	
District	No.	Name	Party	Candidate	Party	Candidate	Party	Candidate
Adilabad	1	Sirpur	INC	Koneru Konappa	TRS	Kaveti Sammaiah	PRP	Lendugure Mengaji Patel
Adilabad	2	Chennur (SC)	INC	Gaddam Vinod Kumar	TRS	Nallala Odelu	PRP	Srinivas Andugula
Adilabad	3	Bellampally (SC)	INC	Chilumula Shankar	CPI	Gunda Mallesh	PRP	Amurajula Sridevi
Adilabad	4	Mancherial	INC	Nadipelli Diwakar Rao	TRS	Aravinda Reddy Gaddam	PRP	Karre Lachanna
Adilabad	5	Asifabad (ST)	INC	Atram Sakku	TRS	Pendram Gopi	PRP	Ramesh Ade
Adilabad	6	Khanapur (ST)	INC	Ajmeera Hari Naik	TDP	Suman Rathod	PRP	Bhukya Chandra Shekar
Adilabad	7	Adilabad	INC	Chilkuri Ramchandra Reddy	TDP	Jogu Ramanna	PRP	Chilkuri Thirupathi
Adilabad	8	Boath (ST)	INC	Anil Kumar Jadhav	TDP	G. Nagesh	PRP	Thodsam Vijayalaxmi
Adilabad	9	Nirmal	INC	Allola Indrakaran Reddy	TRS	K. Srihari Rao	PRP	Alleti Maheshwar Reddy
Adilabad	10	Mudhole	INC	Patil Narayan Rao Bhosle	TDP	Samudrala Venugopal Chary	PRP	Gaddigari Vittal Reddy
Nizamabad	11	Armur	INC	K. R. Suresh Reddy	TDP	Aleti Annapurna Devi	PRP	Baddam Madhu Shekhar
Nizamabad	12	Bodhan	INC	P. Sudarshan Reddy	TRS	Shakil Aamir Mohammed	PRP	C. Karunakar Reddy
Nizamabad	13	Jukkal (SC)	INC	S. Savithri	TDP	Hanmanth Shinde	PRP	T. Aruna Tara
Nizamabad	14	Banswada	INC	Bajireddy Goverdhan	TDP	Pocharam Srinivas Reddy	PRP	Kasulawar Balaraj
Nizamabad	15	Yellareddy	INC	Bogudameedhi Janardhan Goud	TRS	Eanugu Ravinder Reddy	PRP	Jamuna
Nizamabad	16	Kamareddy	INC	Mohammed Ali Shabbir	TDP	Gampa Govardhan	PRP	Dhatrika Vittal
Nizamabad	17	Nizamabad Urban	INC	D. Srinivas	TRS	A.S. Poshetty	PRP	M.A. Rahim
Nizamabad	18	Nizamabad Rural	INC	Akula Lalitha	TDP	Mandava Venkateshwara Rao	PRP	Dr. Ravinder Reddy
Nizamabad	19	Balkonda	INC	Srinivas Reddy Shanigaram	TRS	Surender Reddy Vemula	PRP	Anil Kumar Eravathri
Karimnagar	20	Koratla	INC	Juvvadi Rathnakar Rao	TRS	Kalvakuntla Vidya Sagar Rao	PRP	Jangili Sunitha Venkat
Karimnagar	21	Jagtial	INC	T. Jeevan Reddy	TDP	L. Ramana	PRP	Dr. Chandra Shekar Goud
Karimnagar	22	Dharmapuri (SC)	INC	Adluri Laxman Kumar	TRS	Koppula Eshwar	PRP	Gaddam Rajesh
Karimnagar	23	Ramagundam	INC	Babar Saleem Pasha	TRS	Korukanti Chandar	PRP	Kausika Harinath
Karimnagar	24	Manthani	INC	D. Sridhar Babu	TRS	Routhu Kankaiah	PRP	Putta Madhu
Karimnagar	25	Peddapalle	INC	Geetla Mukunda Reddy	TDP	Chinthakunta Vijaya Ramana Rao (Note: Friendly contest between TDP and TRS in AC 25 Peddapalle, AC 39 Sangareddy, AC 50 Maheshwaram, AC 77 Makthal)	PRP	Vemula Padmavathi
Karimnagar	25	Peddapalle	INC	Geetla Mukunda Reddy	TRS	C. Satyanarayana Reddy	PRP	Vemula Padmavathi
Karimnagar	26	Karimnagar	INC	Chalimeda Lakshmi Narasimha Rao	TDP	Gangula Kamalakar	PRP	Devender Rao Katari
Karimnagar	27	Choppadandi (SC)	INC	Gunukonda Babu	TDP	Suddala Devaiah	PRP	Lingampally Kishan
Karimnagar	28	Vemulawada	INC	Aadi Srinivas	TDP	Chennamaneni Ramesh	PRP	Teegala Ravindra Goud
Karimnagar	29	Sircilla	INC	Manjula Gudla	TRS	K. T. Rama Rao	PRP	Gajula Balaiah
Karimnagar	30	Manakondur (SC)	INC	Arepalli Mohan	TRS	Voraganti Anand	PRP	Kavvampally Satyanarayana
Karimnagar	31	Huzurabad	INC	V. Krishna Mohan Rao	TRS	Etela Rajender	PRP	Pingili Venkateshwar Reddy
Karimnagar	32	Husnabad	INC	Aligireddy Praveen Reddy	TRS	V. Lakshmikantha Rao (Note: Friendly contest between CPI and TRS in AC 32 Husnabad)	PRP	E. Peddi Reddy
Karimnagar	32	Husnabad	INC	Aligireddy Praveen Reddy	CPI	Chada Venkat Reddy	PRP	E. Peddi Reddy
Medak	33	Siddipet	INC	Anjaiah Byri	TRS	T. Harish Rao	PRP	Dr. Narasimha Chari Veggalam
Medak	34	Medak	INC	P. Shashidhar Reddy	TDP	Mynampally Hanumanth Rao	PRP	Jagapathi Batti
Medak	35	Narayankhed	INC	Patlolla Kishta Reddy	TRS	Mahareddy Bhupal Reddy	PRP	M. Vijayapal Reddy
Medak	36	Andole (SC)	INC	Damodar Raja Narasimha	TDP	Babu Mohan	PRP	Malyala Rajaiah
Medak	37	Narsapur	INC	Vakiti Sunitha Laxma Reddy	CPI	Chilmula Krishna Reddy	PRP	Kailasa Ramchander
Medak	38	Zahirabad (SC)	INC	J. Geeta Reddy	TDP	Y. Narotham	PRP	D. Vasanth Kumar
Medak	39	Sangareddy	INC	Jagga Reddy	TDP	Chinta Prabhakar	PRP	M. A. Faheem
Medak	39	Sangareddy	INC	Jagga Reddy	TRS	Gadila Nawaz Reddy	PRP	M. A. Faheem
Medak	40	Patancheru	INC	T. Nandeshwar Goud	TDP	M. Sapanadev (Note: Friendly contest between CPI(M) and TDP in AC 40 Patancheru, AC 64 Karwan, AC 99 Ghanpur (Station) (SC))	PRP	J. Ramulu
Medak	40	Patancheru	INC	T. Nandeshwar Goud	CPI(M)	Chukka Ramulu	PRP	J. Ramulu
Medak	41	Dubbak	INC	Cheruku Muthyam Reddy	TRS	Solipeta Ramalinga Reddy	PRP	Maddula Nageshwar Reddy
Medak	42	Gajwel	INC	Tumkunta Narsa Reddy	TDP	Lasmannagari Prathap Reddy	PRP	G. Election Reddy
Ranga Reddy	43	Medchal	INC	Kichannagari Laxma Reddy	TDP	Nakka Prabhakar Goud	PRP	Jangaiah Thotakura
Ranga Reddy	44	Malkajgiri	INC	Akula Rajender	TDP	V. Sharada Mahesh	PRP	C. Kanaka Reddy
Ranga Reddy	45	Quthbullapur	INC	K. M. Pratap	TRS	Koona Pandu Vivekanand	Did not contest (Note: No candidates from PRP in AC 45 Quthbullapur, AC 54 Pargi, AC 55 Vicarabad (SC), AC 72 Kodangal, AC 77 Makthal, AC 85 Kollapur.)	
Ranga Reddy	46	Kukatpally	INC	Vaddepalli Narsing Rao	TRS	Madhavaram Sudarshan Rao	PRP	Kuna Venkatesh Goud
Ranga Reddy	47	Uppal	INC	B. Raji Reddy	TRS	M. Yadagiri Reddy	PRP	Amirishetty Narender
Ranga Reddy	48	Ibrahimpatnam	INC	Malreddy Ranga Reddy	TDP	Manchireddy Kishan Reddy	PRP	T. Devender Goud
Ranga Reddy	49	Lal Bahadur Nagar	INC	Devireddy Sudheer Reddy	TDP	S. V. Krishna Prasad	PRP	Sama Ranga Reddy
Ranga Reddy	50	Maheshwaram	INC	Sabitha Indra Reddy	TDP	Teegala Krishna Reddy	PRP	A. Venkat Narayana Reddy
Ranga Reddy	50	Maheshwaram	INC	Sabitha Indra Reddy	TRS	Kotha Prabhakar Reddy	PRP	A. Venkat Narayana Reddy
Ranga Reddy	51	Rajendranagar	INC	Jnaneshwar	TDP	T. Prakash Goud	PRP	Sama Rajpal Reddy
Ranga Reddy	52	Serilingampally	INC	M. Bikshapathi Yadav	TDP	Movva Satyanarayana	PRP	Bandi Ramesh
Ranga Reddy	53	Chevella (SC)	INC	Kale Yadaiah	TDP	K. S. Ratnam	PRP	Dr. S. Balu
Ranga Reddy	54	Pargi	INC	Kamatam Ramreddy	TDP	Koppula Harishwar Reddy	Did not contest	
Ranga Reddy	55	Vicarabad (SC)	INC	Gaddam Prasad Kumar	TRS	A. Chandra Shekar	Did not contest	
Ranga Reddy	56	Tandur	INC	Malkud Ramesh	TDP	P. Mahender Reddy	PRP	V. Anjneyulu
Hyderabad	57	Musheerabad	INC	T. Manemma	TRS	Nayani Narasimha Reddy	PRP	P. V. Ashok Kumar
Hyderabad	58	Malakpet	INC	M. Vijaya Simha Reddy	TDP	Md. Muzaffar Ali Khan	PRP	C. Raju @ Karate Raju
Hyderabad	59	Amberpet	INC	Mohd. Fareeduddin	TRS	K. Jagdishwar	PRP	G. Srinivas Goud
Hyderabad	60	Khairatabad	INC	Danam Nagender	TDP	K. Vijaya Rama Rao	PRP	Navvada Vijayendra
Hyderabad	61	Jubilee Hills	INC	P. Vishnuvardhan Reddy	TDP	Mohammed Saleem	PRP	Humayun Syeed
Hyderabad	62	Sanath Nagar	INC	Marri Shashidhar Reddy	TRS	T. Padma Rao Goud	PRP	P. L. Mahender
Hyderabad	63	Nampalli	INC	E. Vinod Kumar	TRS	Mettu Surya Prakash	PRP	Mohd. Feroz Khan
Hyderabad	64	Karwan	INC	T. Roop Singh	TDP	Osman Bin Mohammed Al Hajri	PRP	V. Venkata Krishna
Hyderabad	64	Karwan	INC	T. Roop Singh	CPI(M)	M. Srinivas Reddy	PRP	V. Venkata Krishna
Hyderabad	65	Goshamahal	INC	Mukesh Goud	TDP	G. S. Bugga Rao	PRP	G. Madhavi Deepak
Hyderabad	66	Charminar	INC	B. Buchi Das	TDP	Ali Bin Ibrahim Masqati	PRP	Mir Yousuf Ali
Hyderabad	67	Chandrayangutta	INC	B. Venkatesh	TRS	Syed Khaja Fakruddin	PRP	M. Raju Yadav
Hyderabad	68	Yakutpura	INC	G. Rathnamaiah	Did not contest (Note: No candidates from Mahakutami (TDP, TRS, CPI(M), CPI in AC 68 Yakutpura, AC 232 Kanigiri)		PRP	S. Raj Kumar
Hyderabad	69	Bahdurpura	INC	Syed Raza Hussain Azad	CPI	Mir Ahmed Ali	PRP	Syed Yonus Deashmuk
Hyderabad	70	Secunderabad	INC	Jayasudha Kapoor	TDP	Talasani Srinivas Yadav	PRP	Mekala Saranga Pani
Hyderabad	71	Secunderabad Cantt. (SC)	INC	P. Shankar Rao	TDP	G. Sayanna	PRP	Narra Ravi Kumar
Mahbubnagar	72	Kodangal	INC	Gurunath Reddy	TDP	Anumula Revanth Reddy	Did not contest	
Mahbubnagar	73	Narayanpet	INC	Sugappa	TDP	Yelkoti Yella Reddy	PRP	Dr. K. Sai Babu
Mahbubnagar	74	Mahbubnagar	INC	Puli Veeranna	TRS	Syed Ibrahim	PRP	Amruth Prasad Goud
Mahbubnagar	75	Jadcherla	INC	Mallu Ravi	TDP	M. Chandra Shekar	PRP	Dr. V. Ram Reddy
Mahbubnagar	76	Devarkadra	INC	S. Swarna Sudhakar	TDP	Seetha Dayakar Reddy	PRP	K. S. Ravi Kumar
Mahbubnagar	77	Makthal	INC	Chittem Rammohan Reddy	TDP	K. Dayakar Reddy	Did not contest	
Mahbubnagar	77	Makthal	INC	Chittem Rammohan Reddy	TRS	M. Sreedhar Goud	Did not contest	
Mahbubnagar	78	Wanaparthy	INC	G. Chinna Reddy	TDP	Ravula Chandrasekhar Reddy	PRP	Dr. A. Bhupesh Kumar
Mahbubnagar	79	Gadwal	INC	D. K. Aruna	TDP	Bandla Krishna Mohan Reddy	PRP	Gattu Bheemudu
Mahbubnagar	80	Alampur (SC)	INC	V. M. Abraham	TDP	R. Prasanna Kumar	PRP	Surupa Shobharani
Mahbubnagar	81	Nagarkurnool	INC	Kuchakulla Damoder Reddy	TDP	Nagam Janardhan Reddy	PRP	S.K. Noorjahan
Mahbubnagar	82	Achampet (SC)	INC	Chikkudu Vamshi Krishna	TDP	P. Ramulu	PRP	P. Muneendranath
Mahbubnagar	83	Kalwakurthy	INC	Yadma Kista Reddy	TDP	Gurka Jaipal Yadav	PRP	J. Chitharanjandas
Mahbubnagar	84	Shadnagar	INC	Chowlapally Pratap Reddy	TRS	Yelganamoni Anjaiah Yadav	PRP	Pathlavath Mittu Naik
Mahbubnagar	85	Kollapur	INC	Jupally Krishna Rao	TDP	Chintalapally Jagadeeswar Rao	Did not contest	
Nalgonda	86	Devarakonda (ST)	INC	Balu Naik	CPI	Ramavath Ravindra Kumar	PRP	Vadtya Ramesh
Nalgonda	87	Nagarjuna Sagar	INC	Kunduru Jana Reddy	TDP	Tera Chinnapa Reddy	PRP	Eslavath Ramchander Naik
Nalgonda	88	Miryalguda	INC	Gangadhar Tirunagaru	CPI(M)	Julakanti Ranga Reddy	PRP	Alugubelli Amarender Reddy
Nalgonda	89	Huzurnagar	INC	N. Uttam Kumar Reddy	TRS	Guntakandla Jagadish Reddy	PRP	Sreenivasa Rao Mekala
Nalgonda	90	Kodad	INC	Md. Mahaboob Jani	TDP	Chander Rao Venepalli	PRP	Gagadam Sudhakar Rao
Nalgonda	91	Suryapet	INC	Ramreddy Damodar Reddy	TRS	Poreddy Chandra Sekhar Reddy	PRP	Bandaru Dhanunjaya Goud
Nalgonda	92	Nalgonda	INC	Komatireddy Venkat Reddy	CPI(M)	Nandyala Narsimha Reddy	PRP	Dubbaka Narsimha Reddy
Nalgonda	93	Munugode	INC	Palvai Govardhan Reddy	CPI	Vujjini Yadagiri Rao	PRP	Taduri Venkat Reddy
Nalgonda	94	Bhongir	INC	Chinthala Venkateshwar Reddy	TDP	Alimineti Madhava Reddy	PRP	Pachimatla Shivaraju Reddy
Nalgonda	95	Nakrekal (SC)	INC	Chirumarthi Lingaiah	CPI(M)	Mamidi Sarvaiah	PRP	Daida Sravan Kumar
Nalgonda	96	Thungathurthy (SC)	INC	Gudipati Narsaiah	TDP	Motkupalli Narasimhulu	PRP	Jogunuri Sunder Rao
Nalgonda	97	Alair	INC	Budida Bikshamaiah Goud	TRS	Kallem Yadagiri Reddy	PRP	Bandru Shobha Rani
Warangal	98	Jangoan	INC	Ponnala Lakshmaiah	TRS	Kommuri Pratap Reddy	PRP	Jalli Siddaiah
Warangal	99	Ghanpur Station (SC)	INC	T. Rajaiah	TDP	Kadiyam Srihari	PRP	Aroori Ramesh
Warangal	99	Ghanpur Station (SC)	INC	T. Rajaiah	CPI(M)	Ratnamala Naliganti	PRP	Aroori Ramesh
Warangal	100	Palakurthi	INC	Dugyala Srinivas Rao	TDP	Errabelli Dayakar Rao	PRP	Nemarugommula Praveen Rao
Warangal	101	Dornakal (ST)	INC	Dharamsoth Redya Naik	TDP	Satyavathi Rathod	PRP	Banoth Sujatha
Warangal	102	Mahabubabad (ST)	INC	Kavitha Maloth	TRS	Azmeera Chandulal	PRP	B. Shankar Naik
Warangal	103	Narsampet	INC	Donthi Madhava Reddy	TDP	Revuri Prakash Reddy	PRP	Gonela Ravinder
Warangal	104	Parkal	INC	Konda Surekha	TRS	Bikshapathy Moluguri	PRP	Ailaiah Manda
Warangal	105	Warangal West	INC	Kondapalli Dayasagar Rao	TRS	Dasyam Vinay Bhasker	PRP	Madadi Ravinder Reddy
Warangal	106	Warangal East	INC	Basavaraju Saraiah	TRS	Acha Vidya Sagar (Note: Friendly contest between CPI(M) and TRS in AC 106 Warangal East)	PRP	Errabelli Pradeep Kumar Rao
Warangal	106	Warangal East	INC	Basavaraju Saraiah	CPI(M)	Mettu Srinivas	PRP	Errabelli Pradeep Kumar Rao
Warangal	107	Wardhanapet (SC)	INC	Kondeti Sridhar	TRS	Dr. Gunde Vijaya Rama Rao	PRP	Jannu Jakharaiah
Warangal	108	Bhupalpalle	INC	Gandra Venkata Ramana Reddy	TRS	S. Madhusudhana Chary	PRP	Sada Vijaya Kumar Kunchala
Warangal	109	Mulug (ST)	INC	Podem Veeraiah	TDP	Seethakka	PRP	Khethavath Jayaram
Khammam	110	Pinapaka (ST)	INC	Rega Kantha Rao	CPI	Payam Venkateswarlu	PRP	Janakiram Tejavath
Khammam	111	Yellandu (ST)	INC	Koram Kanakaiah	TDP	Abbaiah Vooke	PRP	Shankar Banoth
Khammam	112	Khammam	INC	Younus Sultan	TDP	Thummala Nageswara Rao	PRP	Eswarapragada Hari Babu
Khammam	113	Palair	INC	Venkata Reddy Ramreddy	CPI(M)	Tammineni Veerabhadram	PRP	Nageshwarrao Rayala
Khammam	114	Madira (SC)	INC	Mallu Bhatti Vikramarka	CPI(M)	Kamala Raju Lingala	PRP	Dr. Saggurthy Vijaya Vani
Khammam	115	Wyra (ST)	INC	Dr. Bhukya Ramachandra Nayak	CPI	Banoth Chandravathi	PRP	Banoth Vani Kumari
Khammam	116	Sathupalli (SC)	INC	Chandrasekhar Sambhani	TDP	Sandra Venkata Veeraiah	PRP	Ravi Nagabathini
Khammam	117	Kothagudem	INC	Vanama Venkateswara Rao	CPI	Kunamneni Sambasiva Rao	PRP	Adavalli Krishna
Khammam	118	Aswaraopeta (SC)	INC	Mithrasena Vaggela	CPI(M)	Payam Venkaiah	PRP	Nagendra Rao Thati
Khammam	119	Bhadrachelam (ST)	INC	Kunja Satyavathi	CPI(M)	Sunnam Rajaiah	PRP	Gundu Sarath Babu
Srikakulam	120	Ichchapuram	INC	Narthu Ramarao	TDP	Piriya Sairaj	PRP	Narthu Seshagiri Rao
Srikakulam	121	Palasa	INC	Juttu Jagannaikulu	TDP	Gowthu Syam Sundara Sivaji	PRP	Vanka Nageswara Rao
Srikakulam	122	Tekkali	INC	Revatipathi Korla	TDP	Kinjarapu Atchannaidu	PRP	Duvvada Srinivas
Srikakulam	123	Pathapatnam	INC	Satrucharla Vijaya Rama Raju	TDP	Kalamata Venkata Ramana Murty	PRP	Palavalasa Karunakar Rao
Srikakulam	124	Srikakulam	INC	Dharmana Prasada Rao	TDP	Appala Suryanarayana Gunda	PRP	Kornu Nagarjun
Srikakulam	125	Amadalavalasa	INC	Boddepalli Satyavathi	TDP	Koona Ravi Kumar	PRP	Thammineni Seetharam
Srikakulam	126	Etcherla	INC	Meesala Neelakantam	TDP	Nayana Suryanarayana Reddy	PRP	Kimidi Kalavenkata Rao
Srikakulam	127	Narasannapeta	INC	Dharmana Krishna Das	TDP	Baggu Lakshmana Rao	PRP	Dola Jagan
Srikakulam	128	Rajam (SC)	INC	Kondru Murali Mohan	TDP	K. Prathibha Bharathi	PRP	Kambala Jogulu
Srikakulam	129	Palakonda (ST)	INC	Nimmaka Sugreevulu	TDP	Gopalarao Nimmaka	PRP	Viswasarayi Kalavathi
Vizianagaram	130	Kurupam (ST)	INC	Janardhana That Raj Veera Vara Thodaramala	CPI(M)	Kolaka Laxmana Murthy	PRP	Nimmaka Jaya Krishna
Vizianagaram	131	Parvathipuram (SC)	INC	Savarapu Jayamani	TDP	Bobbili Chiranjeevulu	PRP	Latha Rittapalli
Vizianagaram	132	Salur (ST)	INC	Peedika Rajanna Dora	TDP	Gummadi Sandhya Rani	PRP	T. V. Hanumantha Rao
Vizianagaram	133	Bobbili	INC	R. V. Sujay Krishna Ranga Rao	TDP	Thentu Lakshmu Naidu	PRP	Venkataramana Merupula
Vizianagaram	134	Cheepurupalle	INC	Botsa Satyanarayana	TDP	Gadde Baburao	PRP	Sunitha Routhu
Vizianagaram	135	Gajapathinagaram	INC	Botcha Appalanarasayya	TDP	Aruna Padala	PRP	Kadubandi Srinivasa Rao
Vizianagaram	136	Nellimarla	INC	Baddukonda Appala Naidu	TDP	Pathivada Narayanaswamy Naidu	PRP	Kandula Raghuram
Vizianagaram	137	Vizianagaram	INC	Kolagatla Veerabhadra Swamy	TDP	Ashok Gajapathi Raju	PRP	Meesala Geetha
Vizianagaram	138	Srungavarapukota	INC	Allu Kesava Venkata Joginaidu	TDP	Kolla Lalitha Kumari	PRP	Gorle Maheswararao
Visakhapatnam	139	Bhimli	INC	P. Uma Rani	TDP	N. R. Anjaneya Raju	PRP	Avanthi Srinivas
Visakhapatnam	140	Visakhapatnam East	INC	Appa Rao Vurukuti	TDP	Velagapudi Ramakrishna Babu	PRP	Chennuboina Srinivasa Rao (Vami Krishna)
Visakhapatnam	141	Visakhapatnam South	INC	Dronamraju Srinivasa Rao	TDP	Vasupalli Ganesh Kumar	PRP	Kola Guruvulu
Visakhapatnam	142	Visakhapatnam North	INC	Vijaya Kumar Thynala	TDP	Bharanikana Jaya	PRP	Dr Shirin Rahman Shaik
Visakhapatnam	143	Visakhapatnam West	INC	Malla Vijaya Prasad	TDP	Gudivada Nagamani	PRP	P. G. V. R. Naidu
Visakhapatnam	144	Gajuwaka	INC	Gurumurthi Reddy Tippala	CPI(M)	Chandada Narasinga Rao	PRP	Chinthalapudi Venkataramaiah
Visakhapatnam	145	Chodavaram	INC	Karanam Dharmasri	TDP	Kalidindi Suryana Naga Sanyasi Raju	PRP	Pinapolu Venkateswaralu
Visakhapatnam	146	Madugula	INC	Avugadda Rama Murthy Naidu	TDP	Gavireddi Rama Naidu	PRP	Pyala Prasad Rao
Visakhapatnam	147	Araku Valley (ST)	INC	Vanjangi Kanthamma	TDP	Siveri Soma	PRP	Mandi Jayavathi
Visakhapatnam	148	Paderu (ST)	INC	Pasupuleti Balaraju	CPI	Goddeti Demudu	PRP	Tamarbha Krishnaveni
Visakhapatnam	149	Anakapalle	INC	Konathala Ramakrishna	TDP	Dadi Veerabhadra Rao	PRP	Ganta Srinivasa Rao
Visakhapatnam	150	Pendurthi	INC	Gandi Babji	TDP	Bandaru Satyanarayana Murthy	PRP	Panchakarla Ramesh Babu
Visakhapatnam	151	Elamanchili	INC	Kanna Babu	TDP	Lalam Bhaskara Rao	PRP	Gonthina Venkata Nageswara Rao
Visakhapatnam	152	Payakaraopet (SC)	INC	Golla Babu Rao	TDP	Chengala Venkata Rao	PRP	Gurindapalli Dhanaraju
Visakhapatnam	153	Narsipatnam	INC	Bolem Muthyala Papa	TDP	Chintakayala Ayyanna Patrudu	PRP	Ruttala Yerrapatrudu
East Godavari	154	Tuni	INC	Venkata Krishnam Raju Sriraja Vatsavayi	TDP	Yanamala Rama Krishnudu	PRP	Rongali Lakshmi
East Godavari	155	Prathipadu (East Godavari)	INC	Varupula Subbarao	TDP	Parvatha Srisatyanarayana Murthy	PRP	Thota Venkataswamy Naidu
East Godavari	156	Pithapuram	INC	Mudragada Padmanabha Reddy	TDP	S. V. S. N. Varma	PRP	Vanga Geetha
East Godavari	157	Kakinada Rural	INC	Venkateswara Rao Nulukurthi	TDP	Satyanarayana Murthy Pilli	PRP	Kurasala Kannababu
East Godavari	158	Peddapuram	INC	Thota Gopala Krishna	TDP	Boddu Bhaskara Ramarao	PRP	Pantam Gandhi Mohan
East Godavari	159	Anaparthy	INC	Nallamilli Seshareddy	TDP	Moola Reddy Nallamilli	PRP	D. R. K. Gollala Mamidada Reddy
East Godavari	160	Kakinada City	INC	Dwarampudi Chandrasekhar Reddy	TDP	Vanamadi Venkateswara Rao	PRP	Bandana Hari
East Godavari	161	Ramachandrapuram	INC	Pilli Subhash Chandra Bose	TDP	Guttula Sri Suryanarayana Babu	PRP	Thota Trimurthulu
East Godavari	162	Mummidivaram	INC	Ponnada Venkata Satish Kumar	TDP	Srinuvasa Raju Nadimpalli	PRP	Suryanarayana Kudupudi
East Godavari	163	Amalapuram (SC)	INC	Pinipe Viswarup	TDP	Aithabathula Ananda Rao	PRP	Chinta Krishna Murthy
East Godavari	164	Razole (SC)	INC	Rapaka Vara Prasada Rao	TDP	Bathula Ramu	PRP	Nalli Venkata Krishna Mallik
East Godavari	165	Gannavaram (East Godavari) (SC)	INC	Pamula Rajeswari Devi	TDP	Pulaparti Narayanamurthy	PRP	Janga Goutham
East Godavari	166	Kothapeta	INC	Chirla Jaggi Reddy	TDP	Reddy Subrahmanyam	PRP	Bandaru Satyananda Rao
East Godavari	167	Mandapeta	INC	Krishnarjuna Chowdary Bikkina	TDP	V. Jogeswara Rao	PRP	V. V. S. S. Chowdary
East Godavari	168	Rajanagaram	INC	Chitturi Ravindra	TDP	Pendurthi Venkatesh	PRP	Muthyala Srinivas
East Godavari	169	Rajahmundry City	INC	Routhu Surya Prakasarao	TDP	Gorantla Buchaiah Choudary	PRP	Challa Sankara Rao
East Godavari	170	Rajahmundry Rural	INC	Jakkampudi Vijaya Lakshmi	TDP	Chandana Ramesh	PRP	Ravanam Swami Naidu
East Godavari	171	Jaggampeta	INC	Thota Narasimham	TDP	Jyothula Naga Veera	PRP	Jyothula Nehru
East Godavari	172	Rampachodavaram (ST)	INC	K. K. V. V. V. Satyanarayana Reddy	TDP	Chinnam Babu Ramesh	PRP	Seethamsetti Venkateswararao
West Godavari	173	Kovvur (SC)	INC	Koyye Moshenu Raju	TDP	T. V. Rama Rao	PRP	Bunga Saradhi
West Godavari	174	Nidadavole	INC	Geddam Srinivas Naidu	TDP	Burugupalli Sesha Rao	PRP	Rudraraju Gajapathi Kumar Raju
West Godavari	175	Achanta	INC	Pithani Satyanarayana	TDP	Karri Radha Krishna Reddy	PRP	Kudupudi Srinivasa Rao
West Godavari	176	Palacole	INC	Bangaru Usha Rani	TDP	Chavatapalli Satyanarayana Murthy (Dr. Babji)	PRP	Chiranjeevi
West Godavari	177	Narasapuram	INC	Mudunuri Prasada Raju	TDP	Bommidi Narayana Rao	PRP	Kothapalli Subbarayudu
West Godavari	178	Bhimavaram	INC	Pulaparthi Ramanjaneyulu	TDP	Gadiraju Satyanarayana Raju	PRP	Vegesna Suryanarayana Raju
West Godavari	179	Undi	INC	Pathapati Sarraju	TDP	V. V. Siva Rama Raju	PRP	Pallayya Vanapalli
West Godavari	180	Tanuku	INC	Karumuri Venkata Nageswara Rao	TDP	Y. T. Raja	PRP	Akula Sreeramulu
West Godavari	181	Tadepalligudem	INC	Kottu Satyanarayana	TDP	Bapiraju Mullapudi	PRP	Eli Venkata Madhusudhan Rao (Nani)
West Godavari	182	Unguturu	INC	Vatti Vasant Kumar	TDP	Ganni Laxmi Kantam	PRP	Kotagiri Vidyadhara Rao
West Godavari	183	Denduluru	INC	Kotharu Ramachandra Rao	TDP	Chintamaneni Prabhakar	PRP	Ashok Goud Chalamolu
West Godavari	184	Eluru	INC	Alla Nani	TDP	Ambica Krishna	PRP	Badeti Kota Rama Rao (Bujji)
West Godavari	185	Gopalapuram (SC)	INC	Usha Tigiripalli	TDP	Taneti Vanitha	PRP	Kadalaiah Sabbiti
West Godavari	186	Polavaram (ST)	INC	Tellam Balaraju	TDP	Punem Singanna Dora	PRP	Boragam Srinivasulu
West Godavari	187	Chintalapudi (SC)	INC	Maddala Rajesh Kumar	TDP	Karra Raja Rao	PRP	K. M. M. Ambedkar
Krishna	188	Tiruvuru (SC)	INC	Dirisam Padma Jyothi	TDP	Nallagatla Swamy Das	PRP	Vakkalagadda Vijaya Bhaskara Rao
Krishna	189	Nuzvid	INC	Meka Venkata Pratap Apparao	TDP	Chinnam Rama Kotaiah	PRP	Muttamsetti Vijaya Nirmala
Krishna	190	Gannavaram (Krishna)	INC	Muddaraboina Venkateswara Rao	TDP	Venkata Bala Vardhana Rao Dasari	PRP	Bathina Rama Mohana Rao (Ramu)
Krishna	191	Gudivada	INC	Pinnamaneni Venkateswara Rao	TDP	Kodali Nani	PRP	Raavi Venkateswara Rao
Krishna	192	Kaikalur	INC	Yerneni Raja Rama Chandar	TDP	Jayamangala Venkata Ramana	PRP	Kamineni Srinivas
Krishna	193	Pedana	INC	Jogi Ramesh	TDP	Kagita Venkata Rao	PRP	Myla Veerraju
Krishna	194	Machilipatnam	INC	Perni Nani	TDP	Kollu Ravindra	PRP	Vedavyas Buragadda
Krishna	195	Avanigadda	INC	Mandali Buddha Prasad	TDP	Ambati Brahmanaiah	PRP	Simhadri Ramesh Babu
Krishna	196	Pamarru (SC)	INC	Dovari Yesu Das	TDP	Uppuleti Kalpana	PRP	Movva Mohana Rao
Krishna	197	Penamaluru	INC	Kolusu Parthasarathy	TDP	Chalasani Venkateswara Rao	PRP	Dhanekula Murali Mohana Rao
Krishna	198	Vijayawada West	INC	Mallika Begum	CPI	Kakarlapudi Subba Raju	PRP	Vellampalli Srinivas
Krishna	199	Vijayawada Central	INC	Malladi Vishnu	CPI(M)	Chigurupati Babu Rao	PRP	Vangaveeti Radhakrishnan
Krishna	200	Vijayawada East	INC	Devineni Nehru	TDP	Gadde Rama Mohan	PRP	Ravi Yalamanchili
Krishna	201	Mylavaram	INC	Appasani Sandeep	TDP	Devineni Uma Maheswara Rao	PRP	Lakshmi Anupama Chanamolu
Krishna	202	Nandigama (SC)	INC	Parameswara Rao Velpula	TDP	Tangirala Prabhakara Rao	PRP	Guruvindapalli Vara Prasada Rao
Krishna	203	Jaggayyapeta	INC	Samineni Udayabhanu	TDP	Rajagopal Sreeram	PRP	Kota Jaya Kishore
Guntur	204	Pedakurapadu	INC	Noorjahan	TDP	Kommalapati Sreedhar	PRP	Basu Linga Reddy
Guntur	205	Tadikonda (SC)	INC	Dokka Manikya Vara Prasad	TDP	Tenali Sravan Kumar	PRP	Ravela Santhi Jyothi
Guntur	206	Mangalagiri	INC	Kandru Kamala	CPI(M)	Dontireddy Srinivasa Kumari (Note: Friendly contest between CPI(M) and CPI in AC 206 Mangalagiri)	PRP	Tammisetty Janaki Devi
Guntur	206	Mangalagiri	INC	Kandru Kamala	CPI	Muppalla Nageswara Rao	PRP	Tammisetty Janaki Devi
Guntur	207	Ponnur	INC	Marupudi Leeladhara Rao	TDP	Dhulipalla Narendra Kumar	PRP	Tella Venkateswara Rao Yadav
Guntur	208	Vemuru (SC)	INC	Merugu Nagarjuna	TDP	Nakka Ananda Babu	PRP	Kathi Padma Rao
Guntur	209	Repalle	INC	Mopidevi Venkata Ramana Rao	TDP	Anagani Satya Prasad	PRP	Dr. Evuru Ganesh
Guntur	210	Tenali	INC	Nadendla Manohar	TDP	Alapati Rajendra Prasad	PRP	Kilari Venkata Rosaiah
Guntur	211	Bapatla	INC	Gade Venkata Reddy	TDP	Chirala Govardhana Reddy	PRP	Uggirala Seetaramulu Uraf Seetaramaiah
Guntur	212	Prathipadu (Guntur) (SC)	INC	Mekathoti Sucharitha	TDP	Kandukuri Veeraiah	PRP	Korivi Vinaya Kumar
Guntur	213	Guntur West	INC	Kanna Lakshmi Narayana	TDP	Chukkapalli Ramesh	PRP	Tulasi Rama Chandra Prabhu
Guntur	214	Guntur East	INC	Shaik Mastan Vali	TDP	S. M. Ziyauddin	PRP	Shaik Showkat
Guntur	215	Chilakaluripet	INC	Marri Rajasekhar	TDP	Prathipati Pulla Rao	PRP	Posani Krishna Murali
Guntur	216	Narasaraopet	INC	Kasu Krishna Reddy	TDP	Kodela Siva Prasad Rao	PRP	Kapalavayi Vijaya Kumar
Guntur	217	Sattenpalli	INC	Yarram Venkateswarareddy	TDP	Nimmakayala Raja Narayana	PRP	Byra Dileep Chakravarthi
Guntur	218	Vinukonda	INC	Narendra Nath Chebrolu	TDP	G. V. Anjaneyulu	PRP	Bolla Brahma Naidu
Guntur	219	Guruzala	INC	Ala Venkateswarlu	TDP	Yarapathineni Srinivasa Rao	PRP	Gurram Gopi Sridhar Reddy
Guntur	220	Macherla	INC	Pinnelli Ramakrishna Reddy	TDP	Julakanti Brahmananda Reddy	PRP	Manganti Sudhakar
Prakasam	221	Yerragondapalem (SC)	INC	Audimulapu Suresh	TDP	David Raju Palaparthi	PRP	Nandigam Jesi Babu
Prakasam	222	Darsi	INC	Buchepalli Siva Prasad Reddy	TDP	Mannam Venkata Ramana	PRP	Maddisetty Venugopal
Prakasam	223	Parchur	INC	Daggubati Venkateswara Rao	TDP	Gottipati Narasimha Rao	PRP	Sandu Purna Chandra Rao
Prakasam	224	Addanki	INC	Gottipati Ravi Kumar	TDP	Karanam Balaram Krishna Murthy	PRP	Kotapothula Jwala Rao
Prakasam	225	Chirala	INC	Amanchi Krishna Mohan	TDP	Janjanam Srinivasarao	PRP	Paleti Rama Rao
Prakasam	226	Santhanuthalapadu (SC)	INC	B. N. Vijay Kumar	CPI(M)	Anjaiah Jala	PRP	Kommuri Kanaka Rao
Prakasam	227	Ongole	INC	Balineni Srinivasa Reddy	TDP	Edara Hari Babu	PRP	Anand Parvathareddy
Prakasam	228	Kandukur	INC	Manugunta Maheedhar Reddy	TDP	Divi Siva Ram	PRP	Vallepu Raghavulu
Prakasam	229	Kondapi (SC)	INC	Gurrala Venkata Seshu	TDP	Dola Sree Bala Veeranjaneya Swamy	PRP	Sujatha Gangada
Prakasam	230	Markapuram	INC	Kunduru Pedda Kondareddy	TDP	Kandula Narayana Reddy	PRP	Javed Hussain Baig Mirja
Prakasam	231	Giddalur	INC	Byraboina Chandrasekhar	TDP	Lingareddy Chegireddy	PRP	Anna Rambabu
Prakasam	232	Kanigiri	INC	Mukku Ugra Narasimha Reddy	Did not contest		PRP	Uma Maheswari Maddiboina
Nellore	233	Kavali	INC	Katam Reddy Vishnuvardhan Reddy	TDP	Beeda Masthan Rao	PRP	Ramireddy Pratapkumar Reddy
Nellore	234	Atmakur	INC	Anam Ramanarayana Reddy	TDP	Kommi Lakshmaiah Naidu	PRP	Khajavali Shaik
Nellore	235	Kovur	INC	Polamreddy Sreenivasulu Reddy	TDP	Nallapareddy Prasanna Kumar Reddy	PRP	Tupakula Munemma
Nellore	236	Nellore City	INC	Poluboina Anil Kumar	TDP	Tallapaka Ramesh Reddy	PRP	Mungamuru Sridhara Krishna Reddy
Nellore	237	Nellore Rural	INC	Anam Vivekananda Reddy	CPI(M)	T. P. Bhanuraju	PRP	Anam Venkata Ramana Reddy
Nellore	238	Sarvepalli	INC	Adala Prabhakara Reddy	TDP	Somireddy Chandra Mohan Reddy	PRP	Venkata Sesha Reddy Chittoor
Nellore	239	Gudur (SC)	INC	Panabaka Krishnaiah	TDP	Balli Durga Prasad Rao	PRP	Babu Ravindra Manapati
Nellore	240	Sullurpeta (SC)	INC	Vinnamala Saraswathi	TDP	Dr. Parasa Venkata Rathnaiah	PRP	Garika Eswaramma
Nellore	241	Venkatagiri	INC	Nedurumalli Rajyalakshmi	TDP	Kurugondla Ramakrishna	PRP	Meraga Murali Yadav
Nellore	242	Udayagiri	INC	Mekapati Chandrasekhar Reddy	TDP	Kambam Vijaya Rami Reddy	PRP	Sunkara Anjanadri
Kadapa	243	Badvel (SC)	INC	P. M. Kamalamma	TDP	Chennaiah Lakkineni	PRP	Singamala Venkateswarlu
Kadapa	244	Rajampet	INC	Akepati Amarnath Reddy	TDP	K. Madan Mohan Reddy	PRP	Gunipati Ramaiah
Kadapa	245	Kadapa	INC	Mohammad Syed Ahamadullah	TDP	Kandula Sivananda Reddy	PRP	T. K. Afzal Alikhan
Kadapa	246	Kodur (SC)	INC	Koramutla Sreenivasulu	TDP	Ajay Babu Nandavaram Benjimin	PRP	Samineni Saraswathi
Kadapa	247	Rayachoti	INC	Gadikota Srikanth Reddy	TDP	Sugavasi Palakondrayudu	PRP	Mahaboob Basha Shaik
Kadapa	248	Pulivendla	INC	Y. S. Rajasekhara Reddy	TDP	Venkata Satish Kumar Reddy Singareddy	PRP	Veluru Chinna Gangireddy
Kadapa	249	Kamalapuram	INC	Gandluru Veera Siva Reddy	TDP	Putta Narasimha Reddy	PRP	O. Subba Reddy
Kadapa	250	Jammalamadugu	INC	Ch. Adinarayana Reddy	TDP	Ponnapureddy Rama Subba Reddy	PRP	Vongala Nagendra Yadav
Kadapa	251	Proddatur	INC	Nandyala Varada Rajulu Reddy	TDP	Lingaa Reddy Mallela	PRP	Muralidhar Mallela
Kadapa	252	Mydukur	INC	D. L. Ravindra Reddy	TDP	Settipalli Raghurami Reddy	PRP	Iragamreddy Thirupel Reddy
Kurnool	253	Allagadda	INC	G. Prathap Reddy	TDP	Erigela Rampulla Reddy	PRP	Bhuma Shobha Nagi Reddy
Kurnool	254	Srisailam	INC	Erasu Prathap Reddy	TDP	Budda Rajasekhar Reddy	PRP	Budda Sesha Reddy
Kurnool	255	Nandikotkur (SC)	INC	Labbi Venkataswamy	TDP	Chimme Bitchanna	PRP	Madarapu Renukamma
Kurnool	256	Kurnool	INC	T. G. Venkatesh	CPI(M)	M. Abdul Gafoor	PRP	Yannam Rajasekhar Reddy
Kurnool	257	Panyam	INC	Katasani Rambhupal Reddy	TDP	Byreddy Rajasekhar Reddy	PRP	D. Vishnuvardhan Reddy
Kurnool	258	Nandyal	INC	Silpa Mohan Reddy	TDP	N. H. Bhaskar Reddy	PRP	A. V. Subba Reddy
Kurnool	259	Banaganapalle	INC	Challa Rama Krishna Reddy	TDP	Yerrabothula Venkata Reddy	PRP	Katasani Rami Reddy
Kurnool	260	Dhone	INC	Kotla Sujathamma	TDP	K. E. Krishna Murthy	PRP	Marri Govinda Raj
Kurnool	261	Pattikonda	INC	S. V. Chandra Mohan Reddy	TDP	Kambalapadu Edige Prabhakar	PRP	N. Mohan Prasad
Kurnool	262	Kodumur (SC)	INC	Parigela Murali Krishna	TDP	M. Mani Gandhi	PRP	Bojugu Karunakara Raju
Kurnool	263	Yemmiganur	INC	K. Chennakesava Reddy	TDP	B. V. Mohan Reddy	PRP	Vagaruru Lakshmikantha Reddy
Kurnool	264	Mantralayam	INC	Dalavai Ramaiah	TDP	Y. Balanagi Reddy	PRP	N. Rama Reddy
Kurnool	265	Adoni	INC	Y. Sai Prasad Reddy	TDP	Konka Meenakshi Naidu	PRP	B. Khaja Saleem
Kurnool	266	Alur	INC	Patil Neeraja Reddy	CPI	K. Ramakrishna	PRP	Gummanuru Jayaram
Anantapur	267	Rayadurg	INC	Kapu Ramachandra Reddy	TDP	Mettu Govinda Reddy	PRP	Bosula Manohar
Anantapur	268	Uravakonda	INC	Y. Visweswara Reddy	TDP	Payyavula Keshav	PRP	Gurram Chennakeshava Rao
Anantapur	269	Guntakal	INC	Kotrike Madhusudan Gupta	TDP	Sainath Goud Ramagowni	PRP	Pathi Ravi
Anantapur	270	Tadpatri	INC	J. C. Diwakar Reddy	TDP	Peram Nagi Reddy	PRP	Pyla Narasimhaiah
Anantapur	271	Singanamala (SC)	INC	Sake Sailajanath	TDP	Pamidi Shamanthakamani	PRP	Jayaram Kothapalli
Anantapur	272	Anantapur Urban	INC	B. Gurunatha Reddy	TDP	Mahalakshmi Sreenivasulu	PRP	T. J. Prakash
Anantapur	273	Kalyandurg	INC	Nallala Odelu	TDP	Vunnam Hanumantharaya Chowdary	PRP	Market Ramanna
Anantapur	274	Raptadu	INC	Thopudurthi Prakash Reddy	TDP	Paritala Sunitha	PRP	K. Krishnamurthi
Anantapur	275	Madakasira (SC)	INC	K. Sudhakar	TDP	K. Eranna	PRP	S. Hanumanthappa
Anantapur	276	Hindupur	INC	G. Lakshminarayana	TDP	P. Abdul Ghani	PRP	Palla Lakshmi Narayana
Anantapur	277	Penukonda	INC	K. T. Sreedhar	TDP	B. K. Parthasarathi	PRP	K. Ramesh Babu
Anantapur	278	Puttaparthi	INC	Kadapala Mohan Reddy	TDP	Palle Raghunatha Reddy	PRP	Pasupuleti Ramana
Anantapur	279	Dharmavaram	INC	Kethireddy Venkatarami Reddy	CPI	Deveragudi Jagadeesh	PRP	G. Sadhasiva Reddy
Anantapur	280	Kadiri	INC	Battala Venkataramana	TDP	Kandikunta Venkata Prasad	PRP	P. Venkata Sidda Reddy
Chittoor	281	Thamballapalle	INC	Gullolla Sankar	TDP	A. V. Praveen Kumar Reddy	PRP	Kadapa Prabhakar Reddy
Chittoor	282	Pileru	INC	Kiran Kumar Reddy	TDP	Imtiyaz Ahmed Shaik	PRP	Chintala Ramachandra Reddy
Chittoor	283	Madanapalle	INC	Mohammed Shahjahan Basha	TDP	R. Krishna Sagar Reddy	PRP	C. Vasudeva Reddy
Chittoor	284	Punganur	INC	Peddireddy Ramachandra Reddy	TDP	M. Venkatramana Raju	PRP	Vantela Khadar Bhasha
Chittoor	285	Chandragiri	INC	Galla Aruna Kumari	TDP	Roja Selvamani	PRP	Saikam Sairamani
Chittoor	286	Tirupati	INC	Bhumana Karunakar Reddy	TDP	K. Sankara Reddy	PRP	Chiranjeevi
Chittoor	287	Srikalahasti	INC	S. C. V. Naidu	TDP	Bojjala Gopala Krishna Reddy	PRP	Doctor Cipai Subramanyam
Chittoor	288	Satyavedu (SC)	INC	K. Narayana Swamy	TDP	H. Hemalatha	PRP	Sankala Subbaiah
Chittoor	289	Nagari	INC	Chenga Reddy Reddyvari	TDP	Gali Muddu Krishnama Naidu	PRP	G. Sudarshana Varma
Chittoor	290	Gangadhara Nellore (SC)	INC	Gummadi Kuthuhalamma	TDP	Gandhi	PRP	M. Nagabushanam
Chittoor	291	Chittoor	INC	C. K. Jayachandra Reddy	TDP	P. Balaji	PRP	Arani Srinivasulu
Chittoor	292	Puthalapattu (SC)	INC	Paritala Ravindra	TDP	Kolla Lalitha Kumari	PRP	P. Pushparaj
Chittoor	293	Palamaner	INC	Reddeppagari Madhavi Reddy	TDP	N. Amarnath Reddy	PRP	Ravuri Venkataswamy
Chittoor	294	Kuppam	INC	M. Subramanyam Reddy	TDP	N. Chandrababu Naidu	PRP	K. Rajendra Babu

== Results ==
=== Vote share ===
Vote share by party
1. Indian National Congress (36.5%)
2. Telugu Desam Party (28.1%)
3. Praja Rajyam Party (16.3%)
4. Telangana Rashtra Samithi (3.99%)
5. Bharatiya Janata Party (2.84%)
6. Others (12.2%)

=== Seat share ===
Seat share by party
1. Indian National Congress (53.1%)
2. Telugu Desam Party (31.3%)
3. Praja Rajyam Party (6.12%)
4. Telangana Rashtra Samithi (3.40%)
5. Others (6.13%)

=== Results by party ===
Source: Election Commission of India
Alliance/Party		Popular vote			Seats		
Alliance/Party		Votes	%	±pp	Contested	Won	+/−
Indian National Congress		15,374,448	36.55	▼2.00	294	156	▼29
Maha Kutami	Telugu Desam Party	11,826,457	28.12	▼9.47	225	92	▲45
Maha Kutami	Telangana Rashtra Samithi	1,678,906	3.99	▼2.69	45	10	▼16
Maha Kutami	Communist Party of India	514,682	1.22	▼0.22	14	4	▼2
Maha Kutami	Communist Party of India (Marxist)	603,407	1.43	▼0.49	18	1	▼8
Maha Kutami	Total	14,623,452	34.76	N/A	302	107	N/A
Praja Rajyam Party		6,863,509	16.32	new	288	18	new
All India Majlis-e-Ittehadul Muslimeen		360,211	0.83	▼0.22	8	7	▲3
Bharatiya Janata Party		1,192,814	2.84	▲0.21	271	2	Steady
Other parties		1,721,522	4.13	N/A	1086	1	N/A
Independents		1,922,490	4.57	▼2.00	1406	3	▼8
Total		42,058,446	100.00	N/A	3,655	294	N/A
Vote statistics
Valid votes		42,058,446	99.92				
Invalid votes		36,158	0.08				
Votes cast/Turnout		42,096,866	72.72				
Abstentions		15,795,393	27.28				
Registered voters		57,892,259					

=== Results by district ===
District	Seats					
District	Seats	INC	TDP	PRP	TRS	OTH
Adilabad	10	1	4	1	3	1
Nizamabad	9	1	5	1	1	1
Karimnagar	13	3	5	—N/a	4	1
Medak	10	8	1	—N/a	1	—N/a
Ranga Reddy	14	6	5	—N/a	—N/a	2
Hyderabad	15	7	—N/a	—N/a	—N/a	8
Mahbubnagar	14	4	9	—N/a	—N/a	1
Nalgonda	12	7	3	—N/a	—N/a	2
Warangal	12	7	4	—N/a	1	—N/a
Khammam	10	5	3	—N/a	—N/a	2
Srikakulam	10	9	1	—N/a	—N/a	—N/a
Vizianagaram	9	7	2	—N/a	—N/a	—N/a
Visakhapatnam	15	7	4	4	—N/a	—N/a
East Godavari	19	11	4	4	—N/a	—N/a
West Godavari	15	9	5	1	—N/a	—N/a
Krishna	16	6	8	2	—N/a	—N/a
Guntur	17	11	6	—N/a	—N/a	—N/a
Prakasam	12	10	1	1	—N/a	—N/a
Nellore	10	4	5	1	—N/a	—N/a
Kadapa	10	9	1	—N/a	—N/a	—N/a
Kurnool	14	8	4	2	—N/a	—N/a
Anantapur	14	8	6	—N/a	—N/a	—N/a
Chittoor	14	7	6	1	—N/a	—N/a
Total	294	156	92	18	10	18

=== Results by constituency ===
District	Constituency		Winner				Runner Up				Margin	
District	No.	Name	Candidate	Party	Votes	%	Candidate	Party	Votes	%	Margin	
Adilabad	1	Sirpur	Kaveti Sammaiah	TRS	47,978	38.71	Koneru Konappa	INC	40,564	32.73	Margin	7,414
Adilabad	2	Chennur (SC)	Nallala Odelu	TRS	45,012	39.98	Gaddam Vinod Kumar	INC	33,463	29.72	11,549	
Adilabad	3	Bellampalli (SC)	Gunda Mallesh	CPI	41,957	41.04	Chilumula Shankar	INC	33,065	32.34	8,892	
Adilabad	4	Mancheriala	Gaddam Aravinda Reddy	TRS	58,340	44.13	Diwakar Rao Nadipelli	INC	44,513	33.67	13,827	
Adilabad	5	Asifabad (ST)	Athram Sakku	INC	42,907	36.39	Pendram Gopi	TRS	27,621	23.42	15,286	
Adilabad	6	Khanapur (ST)	Rathod Suman	TDP	56,014	48.04	Ajmeera Hari Naik	INC	29,582	25.37	26,432	
Adilabad	7	Adilabad	Jogu Ramanna	TDP	62,235	51.93	Chilkuri Ramchandra Reddy	INC	36,655	30.58	25,580	
Adilabad	8	Boath (ST)	G. Nagesh	TDP	64,895	55.92	Anil Jadhav	INC	33,900	29.21	30,995	
Adilabad	9	Nirmal	Alleti Maheshwar Reddy	PRP	44,261	33.64	Allola Indrakaran Reddy	INC	41,716	31.71	2,545	
Adilabad	10	Mudhole	Samudrala Venugopal Chary	TDP	45,019	32.71	Gaddigari Vittal Reddy	PRP	44,836	32.57	183	
Nizamabad	11	Armur	Aleti Annapurna Devi	TDP	49,009	40.56	K. R. Suresh Reddy	INC	35,950	29.75	13,059	
Nizamabad	12	Bodhan	Podduturi Sudarshan Reddy	INC	42,494	32.19	Shakil Aamir Mohammed	TRS	41,219	31.22	1,275	
Nizamabad	13	Jukkal (SC)	Hanmanth Shinde	TDP	72,971	57.13	S. Savithri	INC	38,847	30.41	34,124	
Nizamabad	14	Banswada	Pocharam Srinivas Reddy	TDP	69,857	54.47	Bajireddy Goverdhan	INC	43,754	34.12	26,103	
Nizamabad	15	Yellareddy	Eanugu Ravinder Reddy	TRS	77,153	52.41	B. Janardhan Goud	INC	40,294	27.37	36,859	
Nizamabad	16	Kamareddy	Gampa Govardhan	TDP	86,986	60.03	Mohammed Ali Shabbir	INC	39,278	27.10	47,708	
Nizamabad	17	Nizamabad Urban	Endela Lakshminarayana	BJP	40,475	42.52	Dharmapuri Srinivaas	INC	29,460	30.95	11,015	
Nizamabad	18	Nizamabad Rural	M. Venkateshwara Rao	TDP	71,813	47.63	Akula Lalitha	INC	43,086	28.57	28,727	
Nizamabad	19	Balkonda	Anil Kumar Eravathri	PRP	46,313	36.05	Shanigaram Srinivas Reddy	INC	38,154	29.70	8,159	
Karimnagar	20	Koratla	K. Vidya Sagar Rao	TRS	41,861	32.38	Juvvadi Narsinga Rao	INC	26,316	20.35	15,545	
Karimnagar	21	Jagtial	L. Ramana	TDP	73,264	54.96	T. Jeevan Reddy	INC	43,415	32.57	29,849	
Karimnagar	22	Dharmapuri (SC)	Koppula Eshwar	TRS	45,848	35.89	Adluri Laxman Kumar	INC	44,364	34.73	1,484	
Karimnagar	23	Ramagundam	Somarapu Satyanarayana	IND	32,479	27.29	Kausika Harinath	PRP	30,259	25.42	2,220	
Karimnagar	24	Manthani	Sridhar Babu	INC	63,770	42.27	Putta Madhukar	PRP	50,561	33.51	13,209	
Karimnagar	25	Peddapalle	C. Vijaya Ramana Rao	TDP	64,319	40.17	Mukunda Reddy Geetla	INC	40,837	25.51	23,482	
Karimnagar	26	Karimnagar	Gangula Kamalakar	TDP	68,738	49.06	C. Lakshmi Narasimha Rao	INC	38,604	27.55	30,134	
Karimnagar	27	Choppadandi (SC)	Suddala Devaiah	TDP	68,841	49.61	Gunukonda Babu	INC	35,853	25.84	32,988	
Karimnagar	28	Vemulawada	Chennamaneni Ramesh	TDP	36,601	29.98	Aadi Srinivas	INC	34,780	28.49	1,821	
Karimnagar	29	Sircilla	K. T. Rama Rao	TRS	36,783	26.92	K. K. Mahender Reddy	IND	36,612	26.80	171	
Karimnagar	30	Manakondur (SC)	Arepalli Mohan	INC	45,304	32.11	Voraganti Anand	TRS	43,132	30.57	2,172	
Karimnagar	31	Huzurabad	Etela Rajender	TRS	56,752	38.82	V. Krishna Mohan Rao	INC	41,717	28.54	15,035	
Karimnagar	32	Husnabad	Aligireddy Praveen Reddy	INC	49,370	29.98	V. Lakshmikantha Rao	TRS	36,195	21.98	13,175	
Medak	33	Siddipet	T. Harish Rao	TRS	85,843	65.02	Anjaiah Byri	INC	21,166	16.03	64,677	
Medak	34	Medak	Mynampally Hanumantha Rao	TDP	57,942	38.40	P. Shashidhar Reddy	INC	36,791	24.38	21,151	
Medak	35	Narayankhed	Patlolla Kishta Reddy	INC	68,472	47.02	M. Vijayapal Reddy	PRP	40,799	28.01	27,673	
Medak	36	Andole (SC)	Damodar Raja Narasimha	INC	78,671	46.22	Babu Mohan	TDP	75,765	44.51	2,906	
Medak	37	Narsapur	Vakiti Sunitha Laxma Reddy	INC	73,924	46.71	Chilumula Krishna Reddy	CPI	60,650	38.32	13,274	
Medak	38	Zahirabad (SC)	J. Geeta Reddy	INC	62,758	40.89	Y. Narotham	TDP	60,572	39.46	2,186	
Medak	39	Sangareddy	Jagga Reddy	INC	41,101	29.74	Chinta Prabhakar	TDP	34,329	24.84	6,772	
Medak	40	Patancheru	T. Nandeshwar Goud	INC	42,516	26.25	M. Sapanadev	TDP	41,269	25.48	1,247	
Medak	41	Dubbak	Cheruku Muthyam Reddy	INC	52,989	37.18	Solipeta Ramalinga Reddy	TRS	50,349	35.32	2,640	
Medak	42	Gajwel	Tumkunta Narsa Reddy	INC	74,443	42.04	Pratap Reddy	TDP	67,268	37.98	7,175	
Ranga Reddy	43	Medchal	Kichannagari Laxma Reddy	INC	69,312	36.25	Nakka Prabhakar Goud	TDP	63,742	33.34	5,570	
Ranga Reddy	44	Malkajgiri	A. Rajender	INC	56,629	29.51	C. Kanaka Reddy	PRP	47,434	24.72	9,195	
Ranga Reddy	45	Quthbullapur	Kuna Srisailam Goud	IND	53,753	34.11	K. P. Vivekanand Goud	TRS	30,534	19.38	23,219	
Ranga Reddy	46	Kukatpally	Jaya Prakash Narayana	LSP	71,753	34.84	Vaddepalli Narsing Rao	INC	56,110	27.24	15,643	
Ranga Reddy	47	Uppal	B. Raji Reddy	INC	57,874	37.70	M. Yadagiri Reddy	TRS	29,691	19.34	28,183	
Ranga Reddy	48	Ibrahimpatnam	Manchireddy Kishan Reddy	TDP	56,508	36.54	Malreddy Ranga Reddy	INC	47,292	30.58	9,216	
Ranga Reddy	49	L. B. Nagar	Devireddy Sudheer Reddy	INC	67,510	34.52	S. V. Krishna Prasad	TDP	54,368	27.80	13,142	
Ranga Reddy	50	Maheshwaram	Sabitha Indra Reddy	INC	65,077	37.21	Teegala Krishna Reddy	TDP	57,244	32.73	7,833	
Ranga Reddy	51	Rajendranagar	T. Prakash Goud	TDP	49,522	31.03	Kasani Gnaneshwar Mudiraj	INC	42,037	26.34	7,485	
Ranga Reddy	52	Serilingampally	Bikshapathi Yadav	INC	61,135	30.11	Movva Satyanarayana	TDP	59,808	29.46	1,327	
Ranga Reddy	53	Chevella (SC)	K. S. Ratnam	TDP	62,332	42.05	Kale Yadaiah	INC	60,083	40.53	2,249	
Ranga Reddy	54	Pargi	K. Harishwar Reddy	TDP	53,099	37.64	T. Ram Mohan Reddy	IND	38,655	27.40	14,444	
Ranga Reddy	55	Vicarabad (SC)	Gaddam Prasad Kumar	INC	58,810	45.94	A. Chandrasekhar	TRS	53,951	42.14	4,859	
Ranga Reddy	56	Tandur	P. Mahender Reddy	TDP	63,737	48.83	Malkud Ramesh	INC	50,534	38.72	13,203	
Hyderabad	57	Musheerabad	T. Manemma	INC	45,966	34.62	K. Laxman	BJP	31,123	23.44	14,843	
Hyderabad	58	Malakpet	Ahmed Bin Abdullah Balala	AIMIM	30,839	30.44	Muzaffar Ali Khan	TDP	22,468	22.18	8,371	
Hyderabad	59	Amberpet	G. Kishan Reddy	BJP	59,134	49.36	Mohammed Fareeduddin	INC	31,891	26.62	27,243	
Hyderabad	60	Khairatabad	Danam Nagender	INC	50,655	39.05	Vijaya Rama Rao	TDP	36,797	28.37	13,858	
Hyderabad	61	Jubilee Hills	P. Vishnuvardhan Reddy	INC	54,519	39.84	Mohammed Saleem	TDP	32,778	23.95	21,741	
Hyderabad	62	Sanathnagar	Marri Shashidhar Reddy	INC	37,994	34.19	T. Padma Rao Goud	TRS	29,669	26.70	8,325	
Hyderabad	63	Nampally	Md. Virasat Rasool Khan	AIMIM	34,439	31.07	Mohammed Feroz Khan	PRP	27,640	24.94	6,799	
Hyderabad	64	Karwan	Mohammed Muqteda Khan	AIMIM	44,950	40.07	Devara Karunakar	BJP	25,667	22.88	19,283	
Hyderabad	65	Goshamahal	Mukesh Goud	INC	55,829	45.48	Prem Singh Rathore	BJP	35,341	28.79	20,488	
Hyderabad	66	Charminar	Syed Ahmed Pasha Quadri	AIMIM	43,725	48.61	Ali Bin Ibrahim Masqati	TDP	33,030	36.72	10,695	
Hyderabad	67	Chandrayangutta	Akbaruddin Owaisi	AIMIM	45,492	46.59	Khayam Khan	MBT	30,315	31.05	15,177	
Hyderabad	68	Yakutpura	Mumtaz Ahmed Khan	AIMIM	61,698	53.82	Hamza Bin Omer Al Jabri	MBT	18,406	16.06	43,292	
Hyderabad	69	Bahadurpura	Mohammad Moazam Khan	AIMIM	65,453	70.80	Mir Ahmed Ali	CPI	8,718	9.43	56,735	
Hyderabad	70	Secunderabad	Jayasudha	INC	45,063	36.32	Talasani Srinivas Yadav	TDP	40,668	32.78	4,395	
Hyderabad	71	Secunderabad Cantt. (SC)	P. Shankar Rao	INC	36,853	33.42	G. Sayanna	TDP	32,670	29.63	4,183	
Mahbubnagar	72	Kodangal	Revanth Reddy	TDP	61,685	46.45	Gurunath Reddy	INC	54,696	41.19	6,989	
Mahbubnagar	73	Narayanpet	Yelkoti Yella Reddy	TDP	45,945	37.66	Sugappa	INC	33,802	27.71	12,143	
Mahbubnagar	74	Mahbubnagar	N. Rajeshwar Reddy	IND	38,247	32.82	Syed Ibrahim	TRS	33,110	28.41	5,137	
Mahbubnagar	75	Jadcherla	M. Chandra Shekar	TDP	66,857	47.68	Mallu Ravi	INC	53,320	38.03	13,537	
Mahbubnagar	76	Devarkadra	Seetha Dayakar Reddy	TDP	58,576	41.37	Swarna Sudhakar	INC	39,540	27.93	19,036	
Mahbubnagar	77	Makthal	K. Dhayakar Reddy	TDP	53,261	40.56	Chittem Rammohan Reddy	INC	47,560	36.22	5,701	
Mahbubnagar	78	Wanaparthy	Ravula Chandra Sekar Reddy	TDP	71,190	45.61	G. Chinna Reddy	INC	60,622	38.84	10,568	
Mahbubnagar	79	Gadwal	D. K. Aruna	INC	63,433	44.88	B. Krishna Mohan Reddy	TDP	53,006	37.51	10,427	
Mahbubnagar	80	Alampur (SC)	V. M. Abraham	INC	49,722	38.44	Prasanna Kumar	TDP	48,539	37.52	1,183	
Mahbubnagar	81	Nagarkurnool	Nagam Janardhan Reddy	TDP	68,026	46.13	Kuchakulla Damodar Reddy	INC	61,433	41.66	6,593	
Mahbubnagar	82	Achampet (SC)	Pothuganti Ramulu	TDP	67,361	46.46	Chikkudu Vamshi Krishna	INC	62,530	43.13	4,831	
Mahbubnagar	83	Kalwakurthy	Gurka Jaipal Yadav	TDP	56,990	36.52	Yadma Kista Reddy	INC	56,393	36.13	597	
Mahbubnagar	84	Shadnagar	Chowlapally Pratap Reddy	INC	62,222	43.62	Anjaiah Yelganamoni	TRS	52,384	36.73	9,838	
Mahbubnagar	85	Kollapur	Jupally Krishna Rao	INC	58,046	38.44	C. Jagadeeswar Rao	TDP	56,538	37.44	1,508	
Nalgonda	86	Devarakonda (ST)	Balu Naik Nenavath	INC	64,887	44.07	Ravindra Kumar Ramavath	CPI	57,419	38.99	7,468	
Nalgonda	87	Nagarjuna Sagar	Kunduru Jana Reddy	INC	67,958	44.01	Tera Chinnapa Reddy	TDP	61,744	39.99	6,214	
Nalgonda	88	Miryalaguda	Julakanti Ranga Reddy	CPI(M)	52,227	35.51	Gangadhar Tirunagaru	INC	47,864	32.55	4,363	
Nalgonda	89	Huzurnagar	N. Uttam Kumar Reddy	INC	80,835	48.28	G. Jagadish Reddy	TRS	51,641	30.84	29,194	
Nalgonda	90	Kodad	Vanepally Chander Rao	TDP	64,742	39.47	Mahaboob Jani	INC	54,918	33.48	9,824	
Nalgonda	91	Suryapet	Ramreddy Damodar Reddy	INC	57,014	37.76	P. Chandrasekhar Reddy	TRS	50,817	33.65	6,197	
Nalgonda	92	Nalgonda	Komatireddy Venkat Reddy	INC	60,665	41.03	Nandyala Narsimha Reddy	CPI(M)	52,288	35.36	8,377	
Nalgonda	93	Munugode	Vujjini Yadagiri Rao	CPI	57,383	34.94	Palvai Govardhan Reddy	INC	53,789	32.75	3,594	
Nalgonda	94	Bhongir	Uma Madhava Reddy	TDP	53,073	35.77	Jitta Bala Krishna Reddy	IND	43,720	29.47	9,353	
Nalgonda	95	Nakrekal (SC)	Chirumarthi Lingaiah	INC	72,023	42.76	Mamidi Sarvaiah	CPI(M)	59,847	35.53	12,176	
Nalgonda	96	Thungathurthi (SC)	Motkupalli Narasimhulu	TDP	80,888	46.77	Gudipati Narsaiah	INC	69,025	39.91	11,863	
Nalgonda	97	Alair	Budida Bikshamaiah Goud	INC	66,905	39.62	Kallem Yadagiri Reddy	TRS	54,003	31.98	12,902	
Warangal	98	Jangaon	Ponnala Lakshmaiah	INC	61,218	40.47	Kommuri Pratap Reddy	TRS	60,982	40.31	236	
Warangal	99	Ghanpur Station (SC)	T. Rajaiah	INC	68,162	39.71	Kadiyam Srihari	TDP	56,952	33.18	11,210	
Warangal	100	Palakurthi	Errabelli Dayakar Rao	TDP	65,280	41.63	Dugyala Shrinivas Rao	INC	62,617	39.93	2,663	
Warangal	101	Dornakal (ST)	Satyavathi Rathod	TDP	69,282	46.03	Dharamsoth Redya Naik	INC	64,659	42.96	4,623	
Warangal	102	Mahabubabad (ST)	Kavitha Maloth	INC	66,209	43.30	Azmeera Chandulal	TRS	50,842	33.25	15,367	
Warangal	103	Narsampet	Revuri Prakash Reddy	TDP	75,400	46.30	Donthi Madhava Reddy	INC	66,777	41.01	8,623	
Warangal	104	Parkal	Konda Surekha	INC	69,135	46.79	Bikshapathy Moluguri	TRS	56,335	38.13	12,800	
Warangal	105	Warangal West	Dasyam Vinay Bhasker	TRS	45,807	39.64	Kondapalli Dayasagar Rao	INC	39,123	33.86	6,684	
Warangal	106	Warangal East	Basavaraju Saraiah	INC	41,952	32.66	E. Pradeep Kumar Rao	PRP	34,697	27.01	7,255	
Warangal	107	Waradhanapet (SC)	Kondeti Sridhar	INC	57,871	38.83	Gunde Vijaya Rama Rao	TRS	51,287	34.41	6,584	
Warangal	108	Bhupalpalle	Gandra Venkata Ramana Reddy	INC	69,570	43.30	S. Madhusudhana Chary	TRS	57,598	35.85	11,972	
Warangal	109	Mulug (ST)	Dansari Anasuya	TDP	64,285	47.73	Podem Veeraiah	INC	45,510	33.79	18,775	
Khammam	110	Pinapaka (ST)	Rega Kantha Rao	INC	40,028	34.69	Payam Venkateswarlu	CPI	39,679	34.39	349	
Khammam	111	Yellandu (ST)	Abbaiah Vooke	TDP	41,605	30.50	Koram Kanakaiah	INC	38,659	28.34	2,946	
Khammam	112	Khammam	Thummala Nageswara Rao	TDP	55,555	36.22	Jalagam Venkat Rao	IND	53,083	34.60	2,472	
Khammam	113	Palair	Ramireddy Venkatareddy	INC	64,555	41.63	Tammineni Veerabhadram	CPI(M)	58,889	37.98	5,666	
Khammam	114	Madhira (SC)	Mallu Bhatti Vikramarka	INC	59,394	37.12	Kamal Raju Lingala	CPI(M)	57,977	36.24	1,417	
Khammam	115	Wyra (ST)	Banoth Chandravathi	CPI	53,090	41.77	B. Ramachandra Nayak	INC	39,464	31.05	13,626	
Khammam	116	Sathupalli (SC)	Sandra Venkata Veeraiah	TDP	79,491	46.97	Chandrasekhar Sambhani	INC	65,483	38.70	14,008	
Khammam	117	Kothagudem	Kunamneni Sambasiva Rao	CPI	47,028	32.89	Vanama Venkateswara Rao	INC	45,024	31.49	2,004	
Khammam	118	Aswaraopeta (ST)	Mithrasena Vaggela	INC	46,183	36.85	Payam Venkaiah	CPI(M)	41,076	32.78	5,107	
Khammam	119	Bhadrachalam (ST)	Kunja Satyavathi	INC	51,466	35.76	Sunnam Rajaiah	CPI(M)	45,083	31.33	6,383	
Srikakulam	120	Ichchapuram	Piriya Sairaj	TDP	45,277	33.24	Nartu Rama Rao	INC	43,002	31.57	2,275	
Srikakulam	121	Palasa	Juttu Jagannaikulu	INC	47,931	40.52	G. Syam Sunder Sivaji	TDP	41,117	34.76	6,814	
Srikakulam	122	Tekkali	Revatipathi Korla	INC	47,513	34.82	Kinjarapu Atchannaidu	TDP	45,620	33.43	1,893	
Srikakulam	123	Pathapatnam	Vijaya Ramaraju Setrucharla	INC	58,936	46.76	K. V. Ramana Murthy	TDP	38,146	30.26	20,790	
Srikakulam	124	Srikakulam	Dharmana Prasada Rao	INC	56,457	38.83	A. Suryanarayana Gunda	TDP	51,987	35.76	4,470	
Srikakulam	125	Amadalavalasa	Boddepalli Satyavathi	INC	48,128	40.26	Thammineni Seetharam	PRP	31,919	26.70	16,209	
Srikakulam	126	Etcherla	Meesala Neelakantam	INC	59,365	39.11	Nayana S. Reddy	TDP	44,350	29.22	15,015	
Srikakulam	127	Narasannapeta	Dharmana Krishna Das	INC	60,426	44.20	Baggu Lakshmana Rao	TDP	42,837	31.33	17,589	
Srikakulam	128	Rajam (SC)	Kondru Murali Mohan	INC	61,771	45.96	K. Pratibha Bharati	TDP	34,638	25.77	27,133	
Srikakulam	129	Palakonda (ST)	Nimmaka Sugreevulu	INC	45,909	42.43	Nimmaka Gopalarao	TDP	29,759	27.50	16,150	
Vizianagaram	130	Kurupam (ST)	J. T . R. V. Vara Thodaramala	INC	48,493	41.43	Nimmaka Jayaraju	PRP	33,440	28.57	15,053	
Vizianagaram	131	Parvathipuram (SC)	Savarapu Jayamani	INC	49,614	41.36	Bobbili Chiranjeevulu	TDP	46,896	39.09	2,718	
Vizianagaram	132	Salur (ST)	Peedika Rajanna Dora	INC	49,517	40.94	Gummadi Sandhya Rani	TDP	47,861	39.57	1,656	
Vizianagaram	133	Bobbili	R. V. Sujay Krishna Rangarao	INC	75,697	49.13	Thentu Lakshmu Naidu	TDP	51,525	33.44	24,172	
Vizianagaram	134	Cheepurupalli	Botsa Satyanarayana	INC	60,677	42.65	Gadde Baburao	TDP	54,735	38.47	5,942	
Vizianagaram	135	Gajapathinagaram	Botcha Appalanarasayya	INC	66,670	44.31	Aruna Padala	TDP	38,996	25.92	27,674	
Vizianagaram	136	Nellimarla	Appalanaidu Baddukonda	INC	48,155	32.60	P. Narayanaswamy Naidu	TDP	47,558	32.19	597	
Vizianagaram	137	Vizianagaram	Ashok Gajapathi Raju	TDP	52,890	38.18	K. Veera Bhadra Swamy	INC	49,608	35.81	3,282	
Vizianagaram	138	Srungavarapukota	Kolla Lalitha Kumari	TDP	40,142	25.51	A. K. Venkata Joginaidu	INC	36,702	23.33	3,440	
Visakhapatnam	139	Bhimili	Muttamsetti Srinivasa Rao	PRP	52,130	29.56	N. R. Anjaneya Raju	TDP	45,820	25.98	6,310	
Visakhapatnam	140	Visakhapatnam East	Velagapudi Ramakrishna Babu	TDP	44,233	32.03	Vamsi Krishna Srinivas	PRP	40,202	29.11	4,031	
Visakhapatnam	141	Visakhapatnam South	Dronamraju Srinivasa Rao	INC	45,971	35.66	Kola Guruvulu	PRP	45,630	35.40	341	
Visakhapatnam	142	Visakhapatnam North	Thynala Vijaya Kumar	INC	49,344	34.59	Shirin Rahman Shaik	PRP	43,821	30.72	5,523	
Visakhapatnam	143	Visakhapatnam West	Malla Vijaya Prasad	INC	45,018	38.81	P. G. V. R. Naidu	PRP	40,874	35.24	4,144	
Visakhapatnam	144	Gajuwaka	Chinthalapudi Venkataramaiah	PRP	50,994	33.20	Nagireddy Tippala	IND	33,087	21.54	17,907	
Visakhapatnam	145	Chodavaram	K. S. Naga Sanyasi Raju	TDP	55,641	36.13	Karanam Dharmasri	INC	54,256	35.23	1,385	
Visakhapatnam	146	Madugula	Gavireddi Ramanaidu	TDP	52,762	37.90	A. Rama Murthy Naidu	INC	45,935	32.99	6,827	
Visakhapatnam	147	Araku Valley (ST)	Siveri Soma	TDP	34,959	29.04	Vanjangi Kanthamma	INC	34,557	28.71	402	
Visakhapatnam	148	Paderu (ST)	Pasupuleti Balaraju	INC	35,653	32.40	Goddeti Demudu	CPI	35,066	31.87	587	
Visakhapatnam	149	Anakapalle	Ganta Srinivasa Rao	PRP	58,568	40.79	Konathala Ramakrishna	INC	47,702	33.22	10,866	
Visakhapatnam	150	Pendurthi	Panchakarla Ramesh Babu	PRP	51,700	32.99	Gandi Babji	INC	48,428	30.91	3,272	
Visakhapatnam	151	Elamanchili	Kanna Babu	INC	53,960	37.02	G. Venkata Nageswara Rao	PRP	43,870	30.09	10,090	
Visakhapatnam	152	Payakaraopet (SC)	Golla Babu Rao	INC	50,698	32.11	Changala Venkata Rao	TDP	50,042	31.69	656	
Visakhapatnam	153	Narsipatnam	Bolem Muthyala Papa	INC	65,465	43.24	C. Ayyanna Patrudu	TDP	57,178	37.77	8,287	
East Godavari	154	Tuni	V. V. Krishnam Raju Sriraja	INC	55,386	39.17	Yanamala Rama Krishnudu	TDP	46,876	33.15	8,510	
East Godavari	155	Prathipadu (East Godavari)	P. Sri Satyanarayanamurthy	TDP	46,925	35.32	Varapula Subbarao	INC	43,639	32.85	3,286	
East Godavari	156	Pithapuram	Vanga Geetha	PRP	46,623	31.19	S. V. S. N. Varma	TDP	45,587	30.50	1,036	
East Godavari	157	Kakinada Rural	Kurasala Kannababu	PRP	53,494	38.25	N. Venkateswara Rao	INC	45,457	32.50	8,037	
East Godavari	158	Peddapuram	Pantam Gandhi Mohan	PRP	46,211	34.17	Boddu Bhaskara Ramarao	TDP	43,155	31.91	3,056	
East Godavari	159	Anaparthy	Nallamilli Seshareddy	INC	70,623	45.16	Gollala Mamidada Reddy	PRP	34,749	22.22	35,874	
East Godavari	160	Kakinada City	D. Chandrasekhara Reddy	INC	44,606	37.28	Bandana Hari	PRP	35,327	29.52	9,279	
East Godavari	161	Ramachandrapuram	Pilli Subhash Chandra Bose	INC	56,589	39.89	Thota Trimurthulu	PRP	52,558	37.05	4,031	
East Godavari	162	Mummidivaram	P. Venkata Satish Kumar	INC	51,087	33.33	N. Srinivasa Raju	TDP	49,162	32.08	1,925	
East Godavari	163	Amalapuram (SC)	Pinipe Viswarup	INC	57,922	41.96	Chinta Krishna Murthy	PRP	51,649	37.41	6,273	
East Godavari	164	Razole (SC)	Rapaka Vara Prasada Rao	INC	52,319	39.76	N. Krishna Mallik	PRP	46,450	35.30	5,869	
East Godavari	165	Gannavaram (SC)	Pamula Rajeswari Devi	INC	44,756	33.26	Pulaparthy Narayana Murthy	TDP	41,651	30.96	3,105	
East Godavari	166	Kothapeta	Bandaru Satyananda Rao	PRP	62,453	37.13	Chirla Jaggi Reddy	INC	59,983	35.66	2,470	
East Godavari	167	Mandapeta	V. Jogeswara Rao	TDP	68,104	43.57	Chowdary Vvss	PRP	50,664	32.41	17,440	
East Godavari	168	Rajanagaram	Pendurthi Venkatesh	TDP	51,520	36.14	Jakkampudi Vijaya Lakshmi	INC	44,584	31.28	6,936	
East Godavari	169	Rajahmundry City	Routhu Surya Prakasa Rao	INC	41,369	31.12	Gorantla Butchaiah Chowdary	TDP	40,085	30.16	1,284	
East Godavari	170	Rajahmundry Rural	Chandana Ramesh	TDP	44,617	32.39	Ravanam Swami Naidu	PRP	43,070	31.27	1,547	
East Godavari	171	Jaggampeta	Thota Narasimham	INC	51,184	34.84	Jyothula Nehru	PRP	50,395	34.31	789	
East Godavari	172	Rampachodavaram (ST)	K. V. Satyanarayana Reddy	INC	32,654	34.16	Chinnam Babu Ramesh	TDP	21,851	22.86	10,803	
West Godavari	173	Kovvur (SC)	T. V. Rama Rao	TDP	55,669	41.80	Koyye Moshenu Raju	INC	40,191	30.18	15,478	
West Godavari	174	Nidadavole	Burugupalli Sesharao	TDP	51,680	34.14	G. Srinivas Naidu	INC	45,914	30.33	5,766	
West Godavari	175	Achanta	Pithani Satyanarayana	INC	54,903	46.24	Karri Radha Krishna Reddy	TDP	39,148	32.97	15,755	
West Godavari	176	Palakollu	Bangaru Usha Rani	INC	49,720	38.09	Konidela Chiranjeevi	PRP	44,274	33.92	5,446	
West Godavari	177	Narasapuram	Mudunuri Prasada Raju	INC	58,560	50.53	Kothapalli Subbarayudu	PRP	41,235	35.58	17,325	
West Godavari	178	Bhimavaram	Pulaparthy Ramanjaneyulu	INC	63,862	40.40	V. Suryanarayana Raju	PRP	41,763	26.42	22,099	
West Godavari	179	Undi	V. V. Siva Rama Raju	TDP	68,102	42.07	Pathapati Sarraju	INC	52,354	32.34	15,748	
West Godavari	180	Tanuku	K. V. Nageswara Rao	INC	53,211	32.70	Y. T. Raja	TDP	51,760	31.81	1,451	
West Godavari	181	Tadepalligudem	Eli Venkata Madhusudhan Rao	PRP	48,747	33.95	Kottu Satyanarayana	INC	45,727	31.84	3,020	
West Godavari	182	Unguturu	Vatti Vasant Kumar	INC	52,973	35.13	Ganni Laxmi Kantam	TDP	46,514	30.85	6,459	
West Godavari	183	Denduluru	Chintamaneni Prabhakar	TDP	69,673	45.27	Kothari Ramachandra Rao	INC	55,442	36.02	14,231	
West Godavari	184	Eluru	Alla Kali Krishna Srinivas	INC	49,962	39.80	Badeti Kota Rama Rao	PRP	36,280	28.90	13,682	
West Godavari	185	Gopalapuram (SC)	Taneti Vanitha	TDP	70,659	43.26	Usha Tigiripalli	INC	56,006	34.29	14,653	
West Godavari	186	Polavaram (ST)	Tellam Balaraju	INC	50,298	34.77	Punem Singanna Dora	TDP	44,634	30.85	5,664	
West Godavari	187	Chintalapudi (SC)	Maddala Rajesh Kumar	INC	68,078	38.35	Karra Raja Rao	TDP	66,661	37.55	1,417	
Krishna	188	Tiruvuru (SC)	Dirisam Padma Jyothi	INC	63,624	43.19	Nallagatla Swamy Das	TDP	63,359	43.02	265	
Krishna	189	Nuzvid	Chinnam Rama Kotaiah	TDP	70,206	41.32	M. V. Pratap Apparao	INC	65,063	38.30	5,143	
Krishna	190	Gannavaram (Krishna)	D. V. Bala Vardhana Rao	TDP	82,218	47.02	M. Venkateswara Rao	INC	66,923	38.28	15,295	
Krishna	191	Gudivada	Kodali Nani	TDP	68,034	46.01	P. Venkateswara Rao	INC	50,404	34.09	17,630	
Krishna	192	Kaikalur		TDP	50,346	32.01	Kamineni Srinivas	PRP	49,372	31.39	974	
Krishna	193	Pedana	Jogi Ramesh	INC	44,480	35.17	Kagitha Venkat Rao	TDP	43,288	34.22	1,192	
Krishna	194	Machilipatnam	Perni Venkataramaiah (Nani)	INC	48,580	37.87	Kollu Ravindra	TDP	37,181	28.98	11,399	
Krishna	195	Avanigadda	Ambati Brahmanaiah	TDP	55,316	34.46	Mandali Buddha Prasad	INC	54,899	34.20	417	
Krishna	196	Pamarru (SC)	Dovari Yesu Das	INC	60,048	41.76	Uppuleti Kalpana	TDP	53,108	36.93	6,940	
Krishna	197	Penamaluru	Kolusu Parthasarathy	INC	61,346	37.45	C.Venkateswara Rao	TDP	61,169	37.34	177	
Krishna	198	Vijayawada West	Vellampalli Srinivas	PRP	51,467	34.16	Mallika Begum	INC	43,125	28.63	8,342	
Krishna	199	Vijayawada Central	Malladi Vishnu	INC	52,426	33.14	Vangaveeti Radhakrishna	PRP	51,578	32.60	848	
Krishna	200	Vijayawada East	Yalamanchili Ravi	PRP	53,319	30.97	Devineni Nehru	INC	53,129	30.86	190	
Krishna	201	Mylavaram	Devineni Uma Maheswara Rao	TDP	78,554	45.70	Appasani Sandeep	INC	65,887	38.33	12,667	
Krishna	202	Nandigama (SC)	Tangirala Prabhakara Rao	TDP	60,489	43.32	Velupla Parameswara Rao	INC	55,318	39.62	5,171	
Krishna	203	Jaggayyapeta	Rajagopal Sreeram	TDP	75,107	50.67	Samineni Udayabhanu	INC	65,429	44.14	9,678	
Guntur	204	Pedakurapadu	Kommalapati Sridhar	TDP	69,013	45.63	Noorjahan	INC	59,135	39.10	9,878	
Guntur	205	Tadikonda (SC)	Dokka Manikya Vara Prasad	INC	61,406	44.07	Tenali Sravan Kumar	TDP	57,786	41.47	3,620	
Guntur	206	Mangalagiri	Kandru Kamala	INC	52,585	32.54	Tammisetty Janaki Devi	PRP	39,823	24.64	12,762	
Guntur	207	Ponnuru	Dhulipalla Narendra Kumar	TDP	61,008	38.51	Marupudi Leeladhara Rao	INC	58,840	37.14	2,168	
Guntur	208	Vemuru (SC)	Nakka Ananda Babu	TDP	55,168	37.86	Merugu Nagarjuna	INC	52,938	36.33	2,230	
Guntur	209	Repalle	Mopidevi Venkataramana	INC	64,679	41.10	Anagani Satya Prasad	TDP	58,734	37.32	5,945	
Guntur	210	Tenali	Nadendla Manohar	INC	61,582	36.57	Alapati Rajendra Prasad	TDP	58,698	34.86	2,884	
Guntur	211	Bapatla	Gade Venkata Reddy	INC	37,456	30.51	Chirala Govardhana Reddy	TDP	36,093	29.40	1,363	
Guntur	212	Prathipadu (Guntur) (SC)	Mekathoti Sucharita	INC	66,324	39.32	Ravela Kishore Babu	TDP	64,282	38.11	2,042	
Guntur	213	Guntur West	Kanna Lakshminarayana	INC	44,676	34.59	Chukkapalli Ramesh	TDP	41,375	32.03	3,301	
Guntur	214	Guntur East	Mastan Vali	INC	45,586	38.45	Shaik Showkat	TDP	36,574	30.84	9,012	
Guntur	215	Chilakaluripet	Prathipati Pulla Rao	TDP	77,399	49.98	Marri Rajasekhar	INC	57,586	37.18	19,813	
Guntur	216	Narasaraopet	Kasu Venkata Krishna Reddy	INC	58,988	43.61	Kodela Siva Prasada Rao	TDP	53,017	39.19	5,971	
Guntur	217	Sattenapalle	Yarram Venkateswarareddy	INC	61,949	41.60	Nimmakayala Raja Narayana	TDP	54,802	36.80	7,147	
Guntur	218	Vinukonda	G. V. Anjaneyulu	TDP	89,961	51.90	Narendra Nath Chebrolu	INC	65,858	37.99	24,103	
Guntur	219	Gurajala	Yarapathineni Srinivasa Rao	TDP	72,250	43.58	Ala Venkateswarlu	INC	62,229	37.53	10,021	
Guntur	220	Macherla	Pinnelli Ramakrishna Reddy	INC	66,953	44.03	J. Brahmananda Reddy	TDP	57,168	37.60	9,785	
Prakasam	221	Yerragondapalem (SC)	Audimulapu Suresh	INC	67,040	50.08	Palaparthi David Raju	TDP	53,846	40.22	13,194	
Prakasam	222	Darsi	Buchepalli Siva Prasad Reddy	INC	66,418	42.96	Mannam Venkata Ramana	TDP	53,028	34.30	13,390	
Prakasam	223	Parchur	Daggubati Venkateswara Rao	INC	73,691	43.39	Gottipati Narasimha Rao	TDP	70,731	41.65	2,960	
Prakasam	224	Addanki	Gottipati Ravi Kumar	INC	86,035	49.59	K. Balaram Krishna Murthy	TDP	70,271	40.50	15,764	
Prakasam	225	Chirala	Amanchi Krishna Mohan	INC	56,600	43.63	Janjanam Srinivasarao	TDP	45,314	34.93	11,286	
Prakasam	226	Santhanuthalapadu (SC)	B. N. Vijay Kumar	INC	63,769	43.93	Jala Anjaiah	CPI(M)	54,238	37.36	9,531	
Prakasam	227	Ongole	Balineni Srinivasa Reddy	INC	67,214	42.94	Edara Hari Babu	TDP	44,228	28.26	22,986	
Prakasam	228	Kandukur	Manugunta Maheedhar Reddy	INC	74,553	48.22	Divi Siva Ram	TDP	70,310	45.47	4,243	
Prakasam	229	Kondapi	Gurrala Venkata Seshu	INC	72,075	46.56	D. S. B. Veeranjaneya Swamy	TDP	66,911	43.22	5,164	
Prakasam	230	Markapuram	Kandula Narayana Reddy	TDP	69,744	48.93	Kunduru Pedda Kondareddy	INC	60,690	42.58	9,054	
Prakasam	231	Giddalur	Anna Rambabu	PRP	55,573	37.54	Byraboina Chandrasekhar	INC	48,027	32.44	7,546	
Prakasam	232	Kanigiri	Mukku Ugra Narasimha Reddy	INC	60,161	45.81	S. Madhu Sudhana Rao	IND	57,226	43.58	2,935	
Nellore	233	Kavali	Beeda Masthan Rao	TDP	69,219	44.75	K. Vishnuvardhan Reddy	INC	50,192	32.45	19,027	
Nellore	234	Atmakur	Anam Ramanarayana Reddy	INC	76,907	51.92	Kommi Lakshmaiah Naidu	TDP	58,263	39.33	18,644	
Nellore	235	Kovur	N. Prasanna Kumar Reddy	TDP	73,212	43.32	P. Srinivasulu Reddy	INC	65,768	38.91	7,444	
Nellore	236	Nellore City	M. Sridhara Krishna Reddy	PRP	36,103	33.93	Anil Kumar Poluboina	INC	36,013	33.85	90	
Nellore	237	Nellore Rural	Anam Vivekananda Reddy	INC	46,941	37.82	Anam Venkata Ramana Reddy	PRP	43,810	35.30	3,131	
Nellore	238	Sarvepalli	Adala Prabhakara Reddy	INC	73,760	47.30	S.Chandra Mohan Reddy	TDP	63,476	40.71	10,284	
Nellore	239	Gudur (SC)	Balli Durga Prasad Rao	TDP	64,330	42.09	Panabaka Krishnaiah	INC	53,092	34.74	11,238	
Nellore	240	Sullurpeta (SC)	Parasa Venkata Rathnaiah	TDP	66,089	41.34	Vinnamala Saraswathi	INC	60,722	37.98	5,367	
Nellore	241	Venkatagiri	Kurugondla Ramakrishna	TDP	69,731	43.62	Nedurumalli Rajyalakshmi	INC	62,965	39.39	6,766	
Nellore	242	Udayagiri	Mekapati Chandrasekhar Reddy	INC	69,352	46.92	Kambam Vijaya Rami Reddy	TDP	55,870	37.80	13,482	
Kadapa	243	Badvel (SC)	P. M. Kamalamma	INC	78,486	58.08	Lakkineni Chennaiah	TDP	41,892	31.00	36,594	
Kadapa	244	Rajampet	Akepati Amarnath Reddy	INC	60,397	43.67	K. Madan Mohan Reddy	TDP	48,055	34.74	12,342	
Kadapa	245	Kadapa	Ahamadullah Mohammad Syed	INC	61,613	45.08	Kandula Sivananda Reddy	TDP	54,263	39.70	7,350	
Kadapa	246	Kodur (SC)	Koramutla Sreenivasulu	INC	51,747	43.98	Ajay Babu Benjimin	TDP	39,359	33.45	12,388	
Kadapa	247	Rayachoti	Gadikota Srikanth Reddy	INC	71,901	50.21	Sugavasi Palakondrayudu	TDP	57,069	39.85	14,832	
Kadapa	248	Pulivendula	Y. S. Rajasekhara Reddy	INC	103,556	70.62	S. Satish Reddy	TDP	34,875	23.78	68,681	
Kadapa	249	Kamalapuram	Gandluru Veera Siva Reddy	INC	65,386	48.41	Putha Narasimha Reddy	TDP	61,223	45.32	4,163	
Kadapa	250	Jammalamadugu	Chadipirala Adinarayana Reddy	INC	84,416	48.42	P. Ramasubba Reddy	TDP	77,032	44.19	7,384	
Kadapa	251	Proddatur	Mallela Lingaareddy	TDP	73,023	46.45	N. V. Rajulu Reddy	INC	56,867	36.18	16,156	
Kadapa	252	Mydukur	D. L Ravindra Reddy	INC	62,377	43.89	Raghuramireddy Settipalli	TDP	58,016	40.82	4,361	
Kurnool	253	Allagadda	Bhuma Shobha Nagi Reddy	PRP	61,555	40.01	Gangula Prathap Reddy	INC	59,597	38.74	1,958	
Kurnool	254	Srisailam	Erasu Prathap Reddy	INC	49,384	42.70	Budda Rajasekhara Reddy	TDP	45,077	38.98	4,307	
Kurnool	255	Nandikotkur (SC)	Labbi Venkata Swamy	INC	63,442	44.91	Chimme Bitchanna	TDP	57,669	40.82	5,773	
Kurnool	256	Kurnool	T. G. Venkatesh	INC	68,467	61.28	M. Abdul Gafoor	CPI(M)	24,400	21.84	44,067	
Kurnool	257	Panyam	Katasani Rambhupal Reddy	INC	63,323	40.67	Byreddy Rajasekhar Reddy	TDP	54,409	34.95	8,914	
Kurnool	258	Nandyal	Silpa Mohan Reddy	INC	67,430	46.31	A. V. Subba Reddy	PRP	35,541	24.41	31,889	
Kurnool	259	Banaganapalle	Katasani Rami Reddy	PRP	55,438	38.36	Challa Rama Krsihna Reddy	INC	41,752	28.89	13,686	
Kurnool	260	Dhone	K. E. Krishnamurthy	TDP	60,769	43.56	Kotla Sujathamma	INC	56,118	40.22	4,651	
Kurnool	261	Pattikonda	K. E. Prabhakar	TDP	67,640	49.30	S. V. Chandra Mohan Reddy	INC	57,668	42.03	9,972	
Kurnool	262	Kodumur (SC)	Parigela Murali Krishna	INC	47,844	38.19	M. Mani Gandhi	TDP	42,519	33.94	5,325	
Kurnool	263	Yemmiganur	K. Chennakesava Reddy	INC	53,766	41.77	B. V. Mohan Reddy	TDP	51,443	39.96	2,323	
Kurnool	264	Mantralayam	Y. Balanagi Reddy	TDP	52,431	46.83	Dalavai Ramaiah	INC	41,734	37.28	10,697	
Kurnool	265	Adoni	Konka Meenakshi Naidu	TDP	45,294	38.84	Y. Sai Prasad Reddy	INC	45,038	38.62	256	
Kurnool	266	Alur	Patil Neeraja Reddy	INC	43,105	30.85	Gummanur Jayaram	PRP	37,460	26.81	5,645	
Anantapur	267	Rayadurg	Kapu Ramachandra Reddy	INC	76,259	48.93	Mettu Govinda Reddy	TDP	62,168	39.89	14,091	
Anantapur	268	Uravakonda	Payyavula Keshav	TDP	64,728	45.29	Y. Visweswara Reddy	INC	64,499	45.13	229	
Anantapur	269	Guntakal	Kotrike Madhusudan Gupta	INC	61,097	43.71	Sainath Goud Ramagowni	TDP	51,753	37.03	9,344	
Anantapur	270	Tadpatri	J. C. Diwakar Reddy	INC	63,358	42.17	Peram Nagi Reddy	TDP	56,403	37.54	6,955	
Anantapur	271	Singanamala (SC)	Sake Sailajanath	INC	65,367	43.73	Pamidi Shamanthakamani	TDP	62,191	41.61	3,176	
Anantapur	272	Anantapur Urban	B. Gurunatha Reddy	INC	45,275	39.03	Mahalakshmi Sreenivasulu	TDP	32,033	27.61	13,242	
Anantapur	273	Kalyandurg	Raghu Veera Reddy	INC	69,614	47.58	V. Hanumantharaya Chowdary	TDP	65,226	44.58	4,388	
Anantapur	274	Raptadu	Paritala Sunitha	TDP	64,559	45.35	Thopudurthi Prakash Reddy	INC	62,852	44.15	1,707	
Anantapur	275	Madakasira (SC)	K. Sudhakar	INC	70,657	47.78	K. Eranna	TDP	60,242	40.74	10,415	
Anantapur	276	Hindupur	P. Abdul Ghani	TDP	45,506	31.68	B. Naveen Nischal	IND	36,742	25.57	8,764	
Anantapur	277	Penukonda	B. K. Parthasarathi	TDP	68,400	44.89	K. T. Sreedhar	INC	54,015	35.45	14,385	
Anantapur	278	Puttaparthi	Palle Raghunatha Reddy	TDP	59,356	43.24	Kadapala Mohan Reddy	INC	58,335	42.49	1,021	
Anantapur	279	Dharmavaram	Kethireddy Venkatarami Reddy	INC	61,260	41.19	G. Suryanarayana	IND	42,088	28.30	19,172	
Anantapur	280	Kadiri	Kandikunta Venkata Prasad	TDP	72,308	46.67	Battala Venkataramana	INC	57,331	37.00	14,977	
Chittoor	281	Thamballapalle	A. V. Praveen Kumar Reddy	TDP	46,653	32.02	G. Shankar	INC	43,695	29.99	2,958	
Chittoor	282	Pileru	Nallari Kiran Kumar Reddy	INC	53,905	35.75	Imtiyaz Ahmed Shaik	TDP	44,773	29.70	9,132	
Chittoor	283	Madanapalle	M. Shajahan Basha	INC	53,456	38.81	R. Krishna Sagar Reddy	TDP	42,584	30.92	10,872	
Chittoor	284	Punganur	P. Ramachandra Reddy	INC	84,083	51.64	M. Venkataramana Raju	TDP	43,356	26.63	40,727	
Chittoor	285	Chandragiri	Galla Aruna Kumari	INC	71,942	42.10	Roja Selvamani	TDP	60,962	35.68	10,980	
Chittoor	286	Tirupati	Konidela Chiranjeevi	PRP	56,309	44.12	Bhumana Karunakar Reddy	INC	40,379	31.64	15,930	
Chittoor	287	Srikalahasti	Bojjala Gopala Krishna Reddy	TDP	70,707	43.34	S. C. V. Naidu	INC	58,244	35.70	12,463	
Chittoor	288	Satyavedu (SC)	H. Hemalatha	TDP	65,471	46.05	K. Narayana Swamy	INC	55,780	39.23	9,691	
Chittoor	289	Nagari	Gali Muddu Krishnama Naidu	TDP	60,849	43.35	Chenga Reddy Reddyvari	INC	59,541	42.42	1,308	
Chittoor	290	Gangadhara Nellore (SC)	Gummadi Kuthuhalamma	INC	62,249	45.62	Gandhi	TDP	51,423	37.69	10,826	
Chittoor	291	Chittoor	C. K. Jayachandra Reddy	INC	46,094	36.29	Arani Srinivasulu	PRP	44,384	34.95	1,710	
Chittoor	292	Puthalapattu (SC)	P. Ravi	INC	64,484	42.49	Lalitha Kumari	TDP	63,533	41.86	951	
Chittoor	293	Palamaner	N. Amarnath Reddy	TDP	79,977	46.22	R. Reddeppa Reddy	INC	64,429	37.23	15,548	
Chittoor	294	Kuppam	N. Chandrababu Naidu	TDP	89,952	61.91	M. Subramanyam Reddy	INC	43,886	30.21	46,066	

== Aftermath ==
Despite losing its alliance partners before the elections and facing strong anti-incumbency sentiment, the INC secured a majority in the 294-member Assembly, winning 156 seats. Post-election, the results indicated that the division of anti-INC votes between the Maha Kutami and actor-turned-politician Chiranjeevi's newly formed PRP significantly contributed to the INC's increased seat tally.

The incumbent Chief Minister Y. S. Rajasekhara Reddy was sworn in for a second term on 20 May 2009. His Council of Ministers, comprising 35 members, were sworn in by Governor N. D. Tiwari on 25 May 2009.

== Bypolls ==
After the death of Y. S. Rajasekhar Reddy in a helicopter crash in 2009, while in the office, Andhra Pradesh experienced considerable political instability from 2010 to 2014. His son Y. S. Jagan Mohan Reddy's relationship with the INC deteriorated, and he quit the party in 2011 to launch the YSR Congress Party, triggering bypolls in 2012 for seats vacated after his resignation from the Lok Sabha, and his father's loyalists from INC. During this period, the Telangana statehood movement led by the TRS intensified, including bypolls in 2010 and 2012 as its legislators resigned in support of the cause. The INC government saw leadership changes with Konijeti Rosaiah and then N. Kiran Kumar Reddy as Chief Ministers. Under Kiran Kumar Reddy, the government survived a no-confidence motion in the Assembly amid these tensions. Finally, deepening divisions over Telangana led his resignation and exit from INC, with the formation of Jai Samaikyandhra Party, ahead of the state's bifurcation process.

District	Constituency		Winner				Runner Up				Margin
District	No.	Name	Candidate	Party	Votes	%	Candidate	Party	Votes	%	Margin
Kadapa	248	Pulivendla	Y. S. Vijayamma	INC	Un-contested						
Kadapa	248	Pulivendla	Bypoll necessitated following the death of the incumbent member Y. S. Rajashekhara Reddy from Indian National Congress on 2 September 2009.								
Kadapa	248	Pulivendla	Y. S. Vijayamma	YSRCP	1,10,098	70.09	Y. S. Vivekananda Reddy	INC	28,725	18.29	81,373
Kadapa	248	Pulivendla	Bypoll held on 8 May 2011 following the resignation of the incumbent member Y. S. Vijayamma from Indian National Congress as MLA.								
Krishna	14	Banswada	Pocharam Srinivas Reddy	TRS	83,245	67.75	S. G. Sangem	INC	33,356	27.15	49,889
Krishna	14	Banswada	Bypoll held on 13 October 2011 following the resignation of the incumbent member Pocharam Srinivas Reddy from Telugu Desam Party as MLA.								
Krishna	195	Avanigadda	Ambati Sri Hari Prasad	TDP	75,282	81.55	Syam Raja Sekhar	IND	13,638	14.77	61,644
Krishna	195	Avanigadda	Bypoll held on 21 August 2013 following the death of the incumbent member Ambati Brahmanaiah from Telugu Desam Party on 21 April 2013.								

== See also ==
- State Assembly elections in India, 2009
- Indian general election in Andhra Pradesh, 2009
- 2012 Andhra Pradesh Legislative Assembly by-election
- List of constituencies of the Assembly of Andhra Pradesh
