= Guntakal Assembly constituency =

Constituency of the Andhra Pradesh Legislative Assembly, India

Coordinates: 15.16°N 77.37°E

Guntakal
- Constituency No. 150 for the Andhra Pradesh Legislative Assembly
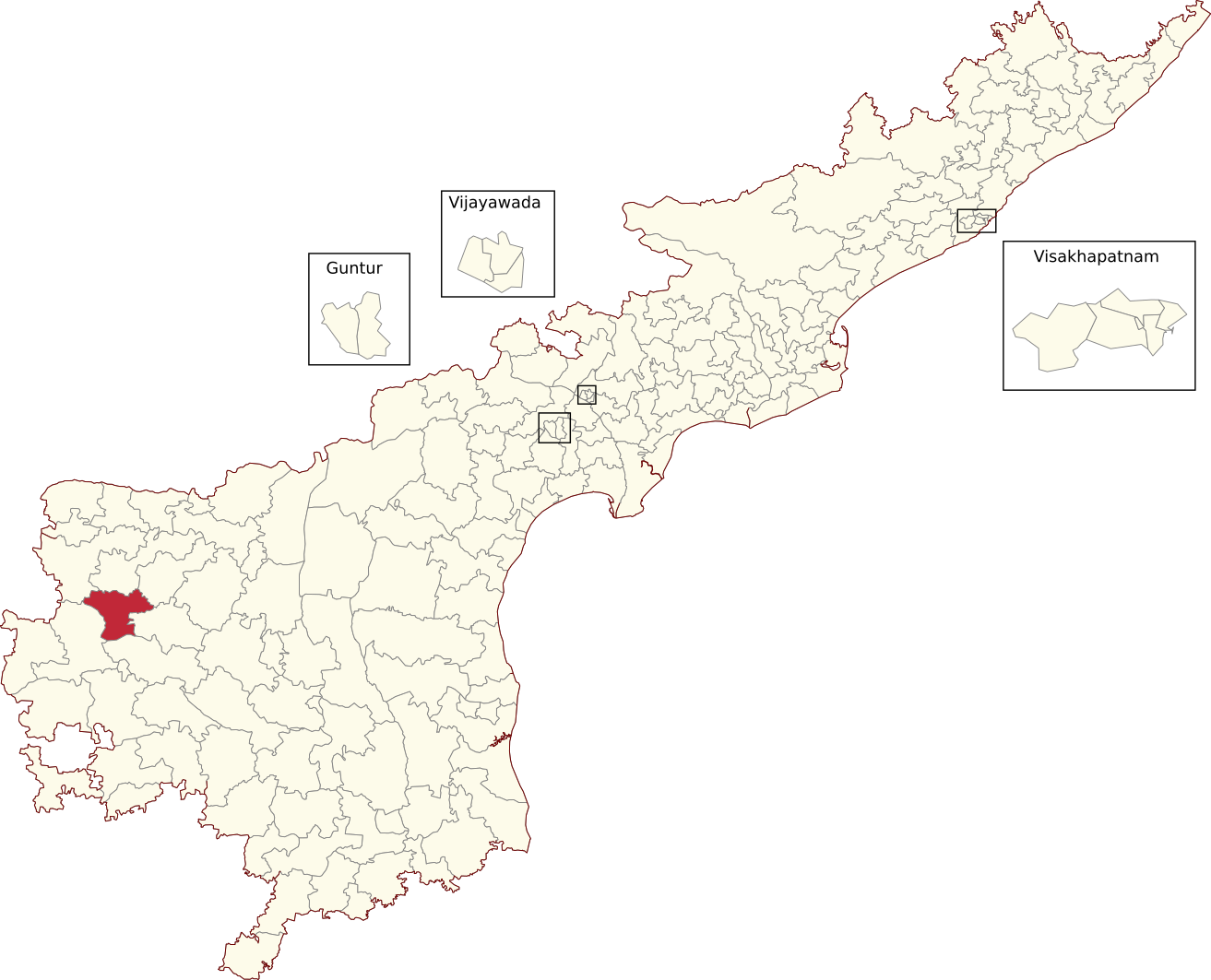
- Location of Guntakal Assembly constituency within Andhra Pradesh

Constituency details
- Country: India
- Region: South India
- State: Andhra Pradesh
- District: Anantapur
- Lok Sabha constituency: Anantapur
- Established: 2008
- Total electors: 252,372
- Reservation: None

Member of Legislative Assembly
- 16th Andhra Pradesh Legislative Assembly
- Incumbent Gummanur Jayaram
- Party: TDP
- Alliance: NDA
- Elected year: 2024

Guntakal Assembly constituency is a constituency in Anantapur district of Andhra Pradesh that elects representatives to the Andhra Pradesh Legislative Assembly in India. It is one of the seven assembly segments of constituencies in Anantapur Lok Sabha constituency.

Gummanur Jayaram is the current MLA of the constituency, having won the 2024 Andhra Pradesh Legislative Assembly election from Telugu Desam Party. As of 2019, there are a total of 252,372 electors in the constituency. The constituency was established in 2008, as per the Delimitation Orders (2008).

== Mandals ==
Mandal
Guntakal
Gooty
Pamidi

== Members of the Legislative Assembly ==
Election	Name	Party
2009	Kotrike Madhusudan Gupta	Indian National Congress
2014	R. Jitendra Gowd	Telugu Desam Party
2019	Y. Venkatrami Reddy	YSR Congress Party
2024	Gummanur Jayaram	Telugu Desam Party

== Election results ==
=== 2009 ===
2009 Andhra Pradesh Legislative Assembly election: Guntakal
Party	Candidate	Votes	%	±%
INC	Kotrike Madhusudan Gupta	61,097	43.71	
TDP	Sainath Goud Ramagowni	51,753	37.03	
PRP	Patti Ravi	20,417	14.61	
Majority		9,344	6.68	
Turnout		139,770	64.17	
INC win (new seat)				

=== 2014 ===
2014 Andhra Pradesh Legislative Assembly election: Guntakal
Party	Candidate	Votes	%	±%
TDP	R. Jitendra Gowd	81,655	47.24	
YSRCP	Y. Venkatarama Reddy	76,561	44.29	
Majority		5,094	2.95	
Turnout		172,869	74.54	+10.37
TDP gain from INC		Swing		

=== 2019 ===
2019 Andhra Pradesh Legislative Assembly election: Guntakal
Party	Candidate	Votes	%	±%
YSRCP	Y. Venkatarama Reddy	106,922	55.96	
TDP	R. Jithendra Goud	58,390	30.56	
JSP	Kotrike Madhusudan Gupta	19,878	10.42	
Majority		48,532	25.40	
Turnout		1,90,667	75.55	+25.45
YSRCP gain from TDP		Swing		

=== 2024 ===
2024 Andhra Pradesh Legislative Assembly election: Guntakal
Party	Candidate	Votes	%	±%
TDP	Gummanur Jayaram	101,700	49.19	
YSRCP	Y. Venkatarama Reddy	94874	45.89	
Majority		6826	2.2	
Turnout		2,06,731		
TDP gain from YSRCP		Swing		

== See also ==
- List of constituencies of Andhra Pradesh Legislative Assembly
