= Gorantla Butchaiah Chowdary =

Indian politician

Member of Legislative Assembly Andhra Pradesh
- Incumbent
- Assumed office 2014
- Preceded by: Chandana Ramesh
- Constituency: Rajahmundry Rural
- In office 1994–2004
- Preceded by: A C Y Reddy
- Succeeded by: Routhu Suryaprakasa Rao
- Constituency: Rajahmundry
- In office 1983–1989
- Preceded by: Tadavarthi Satyavathi
- Succeeded by: A C Y Reddy
- Constituency: Rajahmundry

Personal details
- Born: 15 March 1946 (age 80) Narasayapalem, Guntur district, Madras State, India (now in Andhra Pradesh, India)
- Party: Telugu Desam Party (1983-1995) (1997-present)
- Other political affiliations: NTR Telugu Desam Party (1995-1997)
- Spouse: Gorantla Jhansi Lakshmi
- Parents: Gorantla Veeraiah Chowdary (father); Gorantla Anasuyamma (mother)
- Education: Andhra University (BSc)
- Website: www.gorantla.in

Gorantla Butchaiah Chowdary (born 15 March 1946), is an Indian politician representing Rajahmundry Rural constituency in Andhra Pradesh for the Telugu Desam Party (TDP). He has been elected seven times as a Member of the Legislative Assembly. He has been a general secretary of the TDP. He served as the cabinet minister for civil supplies. As of 2014, he lived in Rajahmundry. He is the first person to be declared won from AP in 2024 elections for the seventh time in a row.

== Election Statistics ==
	Year	Contested For	Party	Constituency	Votes Polled	Opponent	Party	Votes Polled	Margin	Result
1	1983	MLA	Telugu Desam Party	Rajahmundry	50,779	Challa Appa Rao	Indian National Congress	13,428	37,351	Won
2	1985	MLA	Telugu Desam Party	Rajahmundry	47,404	A. C. Y. Reddy	Indian National Congress	40,165	7,239	Won
3	1989	MLA	Telugu Desam Party	Rajahmundry	39,679	A. C. Y. Reddy	Indian National Congress	52,821	-13,142	Lost
4	1994	MLA	Telugu Desam Party	Rajahmundry	48,079	Vundavalli Aruna Kumar	Indian National Congress	41,459	6,620	Won
5	1996	MP	NTR Telugu Desam Party	Rajahmundry	1,22,699	Chitturi Ravindra	Indian National Congress	3,53,861	-2,31,162	Lost
6	1999	MLA	Telugu Desam Party	Rajahmundry	48,438	Vundavalli Aruna Kumar	Indian National Congress	25,411	23,027	Won
7	2004	MLA	Telugu Desam Party	Rajahmundry	34,272	Routhu Suryaprakasa Rao	Indian National Congress	41,826	-7,554	Lost
8	2009	MLA	Telugu Desam Party	Rajahmundry City	40,085	Routhu Suryaprakasa Rao	Indian National Congress	41,369	-1,284	Lost
9	2014	MLA	Telugu Desam Party	Rajahmundry Rural	87,540	Akula Veerraju	YSR Congress Party	69,481	18,059	Won
10	2019	MLA	Telugu Desam Party	Rajahmundry Rural	74,166	Akula Veerraju	YSR Congress Party	63,762	10,404	Won
11	2024	MLA	Telugu Desam Party	Rajahmundry Rural	1,29,060	Venugopala Krishna	YSR Congress Party	64,970	64,090	Won
