= Rajahmundry Rural Assembly constituency =

Constituency of the Andhra Pradesh Legislative Assembly, India

Coordinates: 17.067°N 81.777°E

Rajahmundry Rural
- Constituency No. 51 for the Andhra Pradesh Legislative Assembly
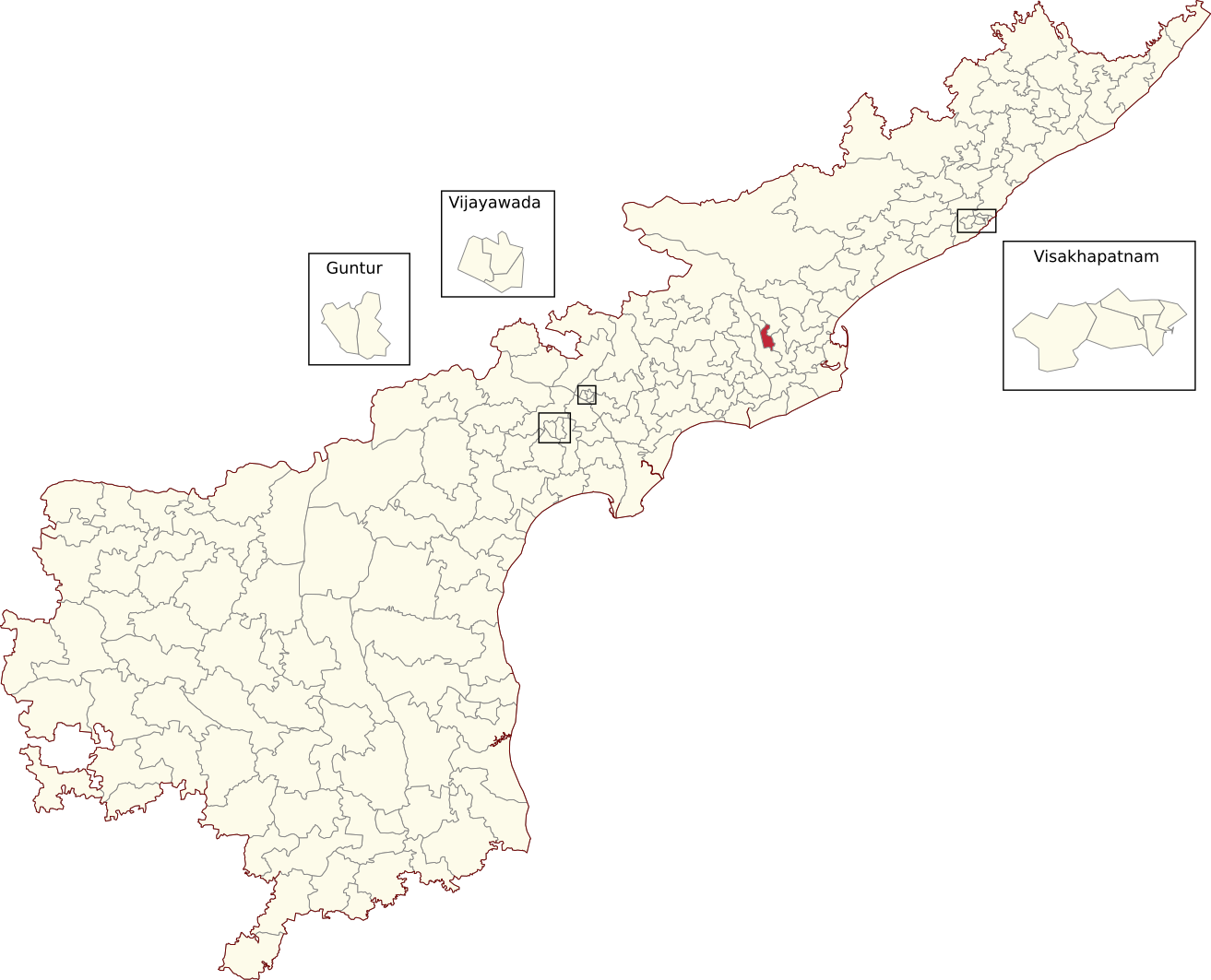
- Location of Rajahmundry Rural Assembly constituency within Andhra Pradesh

Constituency details
- Country: India
- Region: South India
- State: Andhra Pradesh
- District: East Godavari
- Lok Sabha constituency: Rajahmundry
- Established: 2008
- Total electors: 254,339
- Reservation: None

Member of Legislative Assembly
- 16th Andhra Pradesh Legislative Assembly
- Incumbent Gorantla Butchaiah Chowdary
- Party: TDP
- Alliance: NDA
- Elected year: 2024

Rajahmundry Rural Assembly constituency is a constituency in East Godavari district of Andhra Pradesh that elects representatives to the Andhra Pradesh Legislative Assembly in India. It is one of the seven assembly segments of Rajahmundry Lok Sabha constituency.

Gorantla Butchaiah Chowdary is the current MLA of the constituency, having won the 2024 Andhra Pradesh Legislative Assembly election from Telugu Desam Party. As of 2024, there are a total of 254,339 electors in the constituency. The constituency was established in 2008, as per the Delimitation Orders (2008).

== Mandals ==
The mandals and wards that form the assembly constituency are:

Mandal
Kadiam
Rajahmundry Rural
Rajahmundry Municipal Corporation (Ward No.1 to 6, 36 to 41 and 90)

== Members of the Legislative Assembly ==
Year	Member	Political party
2009	Chandana Ramesh	Telugu Desam Party
2014	Gorantla Butchaiah Chowdary	Telugu Desam Party
2019	Gorantla Butchaiah Chowdary	Telugu Desam Party
2024	Gorantla Butchaiah Chowdary	Telugu Desam Party

== Election results ==
=== 2024 ===
2024 Andhra Pradesh Legislative Assembly election: Rajahmundry Rural
Party	Candidate	Votes	%	±%
TDP	Gorantla Butchaiah Chowdary	129,060	63.87	
YSRCP	Chelluboyina Venugopala Krishna	64,970	32.15	
INC	Balepalli Muralidhar	2,728	1.35	
NOTA	None Of The Above	2,699	1.34	
Majority		64,090	32.17	
Turnout		1,99,219		
TDP hold		Swing		

=== 2019 ===
2019 Andhra Pradesh Legislative Assembly election: Rajahmundry Rural
Party	Candidate	Votes	%	±%
TDP	Gorantla Butchaiah Chowdary	74,166	39.28	
YSRCP	Akula Veerraju	63,762	33.77	
JSP	Kandula Durgesh	42,685	22.61	
Majority		10,404	5.51	
Turnout				
TDP hold		Swing		

=== 2014 ===
2014 Andhra Pradesh Legislative Assembly election: Rajahmundry Rural
Party	Candidate	Votes	%	±%
TDP	Gorantla Butchaiah Chowdary	87,540	52.22	
YSRCP	Akula Veerraju	69481	41.45	
Majority		18,058	10.77	
Turnout		167,626	73.85	{{{change}}}
TDP hold		Swing		

=== 2009 ===
2009 Andhra Pradesh Legislative Assembly election: Rajahmundry Rural
Party	Candidate	Votes	%	±%
TDP	Chandana Ramesh	44,617	32.39	
PRP	Ravanam Swami Naidu	43,070	31.27	
INC	J. Vijaya Lakshmi	38,340	27.83	
Majority		1,547	1.12	
Turnout		137,742	72.70	
TDP win (new seat)				

== See also ==
- List of constituencies of the Andhra Pradesh Legislative Assembly
