= R. Jitendra Gowd =

Indian politician

R. Jitendra Gowd (born 1952) is an Indian politician from Andhra Pradesh. He was a former member of the Andhra Pradesh Legislative Assembly from Guntakal Assembly constituency in Anantapur district. He represented Telugu Desam Party and won in 2014.

== Early life ==
Gowd is from Guntakal, Anantapur district, Andhra Pradesh. He is the son of the late R. Ramachandra Goud. He completed his Pre University Course at SV Arts College, Tirupati. He declared assets worth Rs.7 crore in 2014 and Rs.2 crore in 2019, in his affidavits to the Election Commission of India.

== Career ==
Gowd won from Guntakal Assembly constituency in the 2014 Andhra Pradesh Legislative Assembly election representing the Telugu Desam Party. He polled 81,655 votes and defeated his nearest rival, Y. Venkatarami Reddy of the YSR Congress Party, by a margin of 5.094 votes. He was nominated again by the TDP in the 2019 Andhra Pradesh Legislative Assembly election. He polled 58,390 votes and lost to Y. Venkatarama Reddy of the YSR Congress Party, by a margin of 48,532 votes. Reddy bagged 1.06,922 votes.
