= Yalamanchili Ravi =

Indian politician (born 1961)

Yalamanchili Ravi (born 1961) is an Indian poliitician from Andhra Pradesh. He is a former member of the Andhra Pradesh Legislative Assembly from the Vijayawada East Assembly constituency in Krishna district representing the Praja Rajyam Party.

== Early life ==
Ravi is from Vijayawada, Krishna district, Andhra Pradesh. He is the son of Nageswara Rao. He studied till Class 10 at the Andhra University High School, Waltair and passed the examinations in 1974. He declared assets worth Rs.3 crore in his affidavit to the Election Commission of India.

== Career ==
Ravi won the Vijayawada East Assembly constituency in the 2009 Andhra Pradesh Legislative Assembly election representing the Praja Rajyam Party. He polled 53,319 votes and defeated his nearest rival, Devineni Rajasekhar (Nehru) of the Indian National Congress, by 190 votes. He later joined the YSR Congress Party but was denied a ticket for the 2019 election.
