= Seetha Dayakar Reddy =

Indian politician

Seetha Dayakar Reddy (born 27 October 1961) is an Indian politician from Andhra Pradesh. She was a former member of the Andhra Pradesh Legislative Assembly from Devarkadra Assembly constituency in Mahbubnagar district which is now in Telangana state. She won the 2009 Andhra Pradesh Legislative Assembly election representing Telugu Desam Party.

== Early life and education ==
Reddy is from Devarkadra, Mahbubnagar district, Telangana. She married Dayakar Reddy, former MLA in Andhra Pradesh Legislative Assembly, who died in September 2023. She studied her intermediate at R.B.V.R.R. Women's College in 1978 and later did her BA at R.B.V.R.R. Women's College in 1982. She did her MA at Osmania University, Hyderabad in 1984.

== Career ==
Reddy won from Devarkadra Assembly constituency representing the Telugu Desam Party in the 2009 Andhra Pradesh Legislative Assembly election. She polled 58.576 votes and defeated her nearest rival, Swarna Sudhakar of the Indian National Congress, by a margin of 19,036 votes.

In September 2023, she joined the Indian National Congress party. In April 2025, she was appointed as the Chairperson of the Telangana State Commission for the Protection of Child Rights.
