= P. M. Kamalamma =

Indian politician

P. M. Kamalamma (born 1956) is an Indian politician from Andhra Pradesh. She was a Member of the Legislative Assembly in Andhra Pradesh representing the Indian National Congress from Badvel Assembly constituency which is reserved for Scheduled Caste community in YSR Kadapa district.

Kamalamma is from Porumamilla village. She married J Prabhakara. She did her M.Sc. in chemistry from the PG Centre in Anantapur in 1978. She served as the Principal of the Government Junior College for 30 years. She also served as a member of the National Commission for Scheduled Castes.

She resigned her teaching job to contest the elections in 2009. She won the 2009 Andhra Pradesh Legislative Assembly election. She contested the Badvel by-election on Congress ticket in 2021 but lost the election.
