= H. Hemalatha =

Indian politician

H. Hemalatha (born 1951) is an Indian politician from Andhra Pradesh. She was a former member of the Andhra Pradesh Legislative Assembly from Satyavedu which is reserved for Scheduled Caste community in the then Chittoor district. Satyavedu Assembly constituency is presently in Tirupati district. She won the 2009 Andhra Pradesh Legislative Assembly election representing Telugu Desam Party.

== Early life and education ==
Hemalatha is from Satyavedu, Chittoor district, Andhra Pradesh. She married Hubert Edward and together, they have a daughter Helen, who was TDP's constituency in charge for the 2024 Assembly elections. She completed her MA at Andhra University in 1967.

== Career ==
Hemalatha won from Satyavedu Assembly constituency representing the Telugu Desam Party in the 2009 Andhra Pradesh Legislative Assembly election. She polled 65,471 votes and defeated her nearest rival, K. Narayana Swamy, of the Indian National Congress by a margin of 9,691 votes. After being denied ticket for two elections, she was made the TDP in charge for Satyavedu constituency in November 2022.
