= Kunja Satyavathi =

Indian politician (1971–2023)

Kunja Satyavathi (1 August 1971 – 15 October 2023) was an Indian politician from Telangana. She was a former Member of the Legislative Assembly representing the Indian National Congress Party. She was elected in the 2009 Andhra Pradesh Legislative Assembly election from won from the Bhadrachalam Assembly constituency, which was reserved for Scheduled Tribes in the erstwhile Khammam district.

Satyavathi died of heart attack on 16 October 2023.

== Early life and education ==
Satyavathi was born on 1 August 1971 to Shulam Krishna and Seethamma in Vararamachandrapuram, Bhadrachalam mandal. She completed Class 10 and late discontinued her studies. She married Dharma Rao Kunja, She had a son and a daughter.

== Career ==
Satyavathi started her political life with the CPM. Later, she joined the Indian National Congress and was elected as an MLA from Bhadrachalam in 2009. She polled 51,466 votes. She lost to CPM candidate Sunnam Rajaiah in 2014 and resigned from Congress party. In 2017, she joined BJP.
