= Rajahmundry Assembly constituency =

Defunct assembly constituency of Andhra Pradesh

Coordinates: 17.01°N 81.79°E

Rajahmundry
- Former constituency No. 40 for the Andhra Pradesh Legislative Assembly

Constituency details
- Country: India
- Region: South India
- State: Andhra Pradesh
- District: East Godavari
- Lok Sabha constituency: Rajahmundry
- Established: 1951
- Abolished: 2008
- Total electors: 116,929
- Reservation: None

Rajahmundry Assembly constituency was a constituency in East Godavari district of Andhra Pradesh that elected representatives to the Andhra Pradesh Legislative Assembly in India until 2009. It was one of six assembly segments in Rajahmundry Lok Sabha constituency.

The constituency was established in 1951, as per the Delimitation Orders (1951) and abolished in 2008, as per the Delimitation Orders (2008).

== Overview ==
It was a part of Rajahmundry Lok Sabha constituency along with another six Andhra Pradesh Legislative Assembly segments, namely, Burugupudi, Kadiam, Anaparthi, Ramachandrapuram, Alamuru and Kovvur.

== Members of the Legislative Assembly ==
Year	Member	Political party
1952	Chitturi Prabhakara Chowdary	Communist Party of India
1955	Ambadipudi Balanageswararao	Praja Party
1962	Pothula Veertabhadra Rao	Indian National Congress
1967	Chitturi Prabhakara Chowdary	Communist Party of India
1972	Bathula Mallikarjunarao	Indian National Congress
1978	Tadavarthi Satyavathi	Indian National Congress
1983	Gorantla Butchaiah Chowdary	Telugu Desam Party
1985	Gorantla Butchaiah Chowdary	Telugu Desam Party
1989	A. C. Y. Reddy	Indian National Congress
1994	Gorantla Butchaiah Chowdary	Telugu Desam Party
1999	Gorantla Butchaiah Chowdary	Telugu Desam Party
2004	Routhu Surya Prakasa Rao	Indian National Congress

== Election results ==
=== 1952 ===
1952 Madras State Legislative Assembly election: Rajahmundry
Party	Candidate	Votes	%	±%
CPI	Chitturi Prabhakara Chowdary	18,477	40.43%	
INC	K. L. Narasimha Rao	12,228	26.76%	26.76%
KMPP	Kovvidi Linga Raju	11,116	24.32%	
Socialist Party (India)	Maduri Annapurniah	2,882	6.31%	
KLP	Dokiburra Kantiah	996	2.18%	
Margin of victory		6,249	13.67%	
Turnout		45,699	64.77%	
Registered electors		70,560		
CPI win (new seat)				
