= A. V. Praveen Kumar Reddy =

Indian politician

Member of the Andhra Pradesh Legislative Assembly
- In office 1 June 2009 – 2014
- Constituency: Thamballapalle

Personal details
- Born: Chittoor, Andhra Pradesh

Anipireddi Venkata Praveen Kumar Reddy is an Indian politician and a former MLA from Thamballapalle in Chittoor district in Andhra Pradesh.

== Career ==
He was first elected to the Andhra Pradesh Legislative Assembly in 2009. He was elected to the Assembly on TDP, but is joining YSR Congress Party.
