= Kotrike Madhusudan Gupta =

Indian politician

Assembly Member for Guntakal
- In office 2009–2014
- Preceded by: Neelavathi.N

Personal details
- Born: Kotrike Madhusudan Gupta; 30 June 1968 (age 57)
- Party: Jana Sena Party
- Spouse: Aparna
- Children: Kotrike Venkatesh Teja; Srijan
- Occupation: Politician

Kotrike Madhusudan Gupta is an Indian politician who was the 2009 Congress MLA from Guntakal for the Andhra Pradesh Legislative Assembly. He was once a member of the Indian National Congress, and now contesting as Guntakal MLA for the 2019 Andhra Pradesh Legislative Assembly election from Jana Sena Party.
