= Vaddepalli Narsing Rao =

Vaddepally Narsing Rao
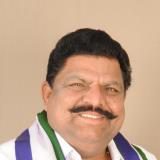

Personal details
- Born: 10 July 1952 Hyderabad, Andhra Pradesh, India
- Died: 23 May 2014
- Party: YSR Congress
- Spouse: V. Pushpalatha
- Profession: Political Leader

Vaddepalli Narsing Rao (born 10 July 1952 - died 23 May 2014) was a popular leader from Kukatpally, Hyderabad in Andhra Pradesh and member of YSR Congress Party. He was set to contest Andhra Pradesh assembly elections in 2014 from Kukatpally constituency. Popularly known as VNR, he was a "staunch follower" of Late Dr. Y. S. Rajasekhara Reddy, the former Chief Minister of Andhra Pradesh.

He served as Chairman of Andhra Pradesh State Mines Development Corporation before joining YSR Congress Party in 2012. He was very active in state politics from a young age and gained popularity for his work and support in construction of popular Venkateshwara Swamy temple, Sai Baba temple and Hanuman temple in Kukatpally and VNR Old Age Home in Bowrampet.

He died in hospital after an illness.

== Early life ==
VNR was born in Kukatpally village, to late Sri Vaddepalli Rama Rao and V. Kamalamma. He is married to Srimathi Pushpalatha and has a son by name Vaddepalli Rajeshwar Rao who assists his father in his daily political and social activities. He entered active politics in 1989 and worked with late P. Janardhan Reddy to strengthen the Indian National Congress in Hyderabad. He organized rallies for the party contestants and he was noted by the bigger politicians for the support he extended to Sri P. V. Rajeshwar Rao and Sri Nadendla Bhaskara Rao in assembly elections.

== Political career ==
He ensured victory for Congress in Kukatpally during Municipal elections in the mid 90s and was promoted to the rank of Organizing Secretary to Prachar Committee in 1996. He gained popularity within the party for his contribution to Kukatpally's development and other social activities and was promoted to vice president of Pradesh Congress Committee in Andhra Pradesh. He then held the position of President of Lions Club. During this time, he teamed with ex-Speaker Sri Narayan Rao to provide financial and moral support to poor school students by promoting the government's Midday Meal Scheme and installing safe drinking water facility in the school for students belonging to weaker sections.

He was made All India Congress Committee (AICC) member in 2001, during which he extended a strong support to Late Dr. Y. S. Rajasekhara Reddy in his padayatra which had brought back Congress to power in the state. Dr. Reddy was highly impressed by VNR's support and appointed him as Chairman for Andhra Pradesh State Mines Development Corporation in 2005 during his tenure as Chief Minister. In 2012 he left the Indian National Congress party to join YSR Congress Party.

He had been selected by the party to contest Andhra Pradesh State Assembly elections in 2014, but died during the election campaign.
