= Y. Venkatarama Reddy =

Indian politician

Y. Venkatarama Reddy (born 1971) is an Indian politician from Andhra Pradesh. He is an MLA from Guntakal Assembly constituency in Anantapur district. He won the 2019 Andhra Pradesh Legislative Assembly election representing YSR Congress Party. He has been nominated again by YSR Congress Party to contest the Guntakal Assembly seat in the 2024 Assembly election but lost the election.

== Early life and education ==
Reddy was born in Guntakal, Anantapur district. His father Yalla Reddy Gari Bheemi Reddy was a farmer. He completed his graduation in Arts from St. Joseph Arts College, Bangalore, Bangalore University, in 1983.

== Career ==
Reddy started his political journey with YSR Congress Party in 2014. He contested the 2014 Andhra Pradesh Legislative Assembly election from Guntakal Assembly constituency on YSRCP ticket but lost to R. Jitendra Goud of Telugu Desam Party by a margin of 5,094 votes. However, he won the Guntakal seat in the 2019 Andhra Pradesh Legislative Assembly election defeating R. Jitendra Gowd, this time around, by a huge margin of 48,532 votes. He lost the 2024 Andhra Pradesh Legislative Assembly election to Gummanur Jayaram of the Telugu Desam Party by a margin of 6,826 votes.
