= Chandana Ramesh =

Indian politician

Chandana Ramesh is a politician from the Telugu Desam Party. He is an MLA in the Andhra Pradesh Legislative Assembly representing the Rajahmundry Rural constituency.
