= Lal Bahadur Nagar Assembly constituency =

Constituency of the Telangana legislative assembly in India

Coordinates: 17.357°N 78.551°E

Lal Bahadur Nagar
- Constituency No. 49 for the Telangana Legislative Assembly
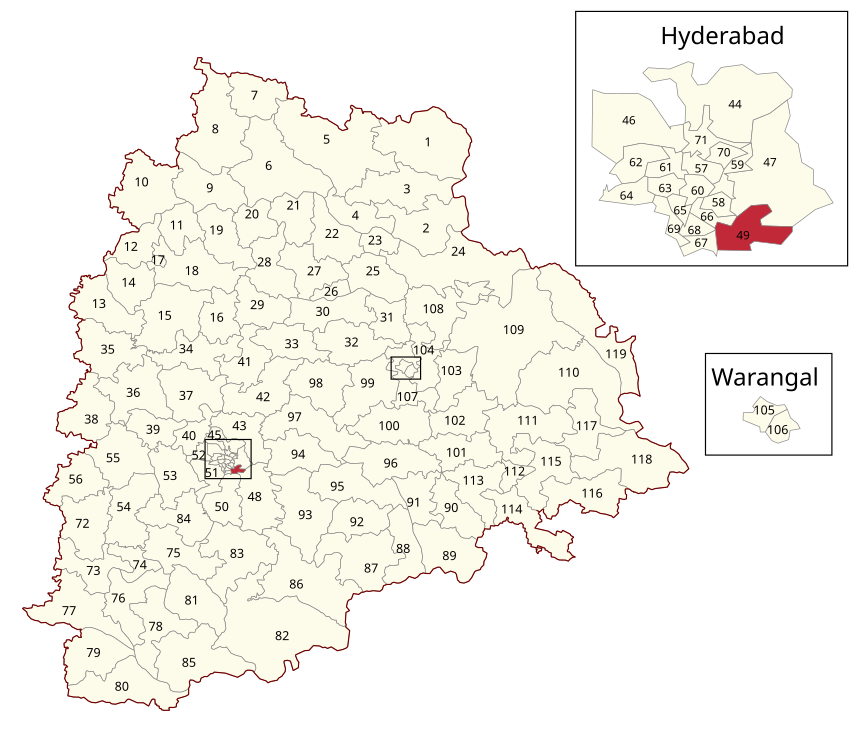
- Location of Lal Bahadur Nagar Assembly constituency within Telangana

Constituency details
- Country: India
- Region: South India
- State: Telangana
- District: Ranga Reddy
- Lok Sabha constituency: Malkajgiri
- Established: 2008
- Reservation: None

Member of Legislative Assembly
- 3rd Telangana Legislative Assembly
- Incumbent D. Sudheer Reddy
- Party: Bharat Rashtra Samiti
- Elected year: 2023

Lal Bahadur Nagar Assembly constituency is a constituency of Telangana Legislative Assembly, India. Created shortly before the 2009 general elections, it is one among 14 constituencies in Ranga Reddy district. It is part of 24 constituencies of GHMC and part of Malkajgiri Lok Sabha constituency. It covers the city of Lal Bahadur Nagar and its surroundings.

== Mandals ==
The assembly constituency presently comprises the following mandals:

Mandal
Hayath Nagar
Saroornagar

== Extent of the constituency ==
It is a newly formed constituency, created just before the 2009 general election; as per Delimitation Act of 2002.

The assembly constituency presently comprises the following neighbourhoods:

Neighbourhood	Districts
L. B. Nagar	Ranga Reddy
Karmanghat	Ranga Reddy
Lingojiguda	Ranga Reddy
Vanasthalipuram	Ranga Reddy
Hayath Nagar	Ranga Reddy
Dilsukhnagar	Ranga Reddy
Saroornagar (part)	Ranga Reddy
Gaddiannaram (part)	Ranga Reddy
B. N. Reddy Nagar	Ranga Reddy

== Members of Legislative Assembly ==
Election	Name	Party
Andhra Pradesh
2009	D. Sudheer Reddy	Indian National Congress
Telangana
2014	R. Krishnaiah	Telugu Desam Party
2018	D. Sudheer Reddy	Indian National Congress
2023	D. Sudheer Reddy	Bharat Rashtra Samithi

== Election results ==
=== Assembly Election 2023 ===
2023 Telangana Legislative Assembly election : L. B. Nagar
Party	Candidate	Votes	%	±%
BRS	Devireddy Sudheer Reddy	111,380	37.74%	▼1.59
BJP	Sama Ranga Reddy	89,075	30.18%	▲21.38
INC	Madhu Yaskhi Goud	83,273	28.22%	▼18.43
NOTA	None of the above	2,966	1.00%	▼0.26
BSP	Guvvala Sai Rama Krishna Mudhiraj	1,456	0.49%	▲0.21
Margin of victory		22,305	7.56%	▼0.35
Turnout		295,131	49.71%	
Total valid votes		295,131		
BRS gain from INC		Swing	▼1.59	

=== Assembly Election 2018 ===
2018 Telangana Legislative Assembly election : L. B. Nagar
Party	Candidate	Votes	%	±%
INC	Devireddy Sudheer Reddy	113,980	46.65%	▲24.13
TRS	Muddagowni Ram Mohan Goud	96,132	39.35%	▲10.73
BJP	Shekhar Rao Perala	21,502	8.80%	New
SFB	Challa Ram Kalyan	3,739	1.53%	New
NOTA	None of the above	3,079	1.26%	New
Margin of victory		17,848	7.30%	▲4.91
Turnout		244,360	52.00%	
Total valid votes		244,360		
INC gain from TDP		Swing	▲24.13	

=== Assembly Election 2014 ===
2014 Telangana Legislative Assembly election : L. B. Nagar
Party	Candidate	Votes	%	±%
TDP	R. Krishnaiah	84,316	33.61%	▲5.81
TRS	Muddagowni Ram Mohan Goud	71,791	28.62%	New
INC	Devireddy Sudheer Reddy	56,489	22.52%	▼12.00
YSRCP	Putha Pratap Reddy	19,376	7.72%	New
LSP	Dosapati Ramu	8,888	3.54%	▼7.42
Margin of victory		12,525	4.99%	▼1.73
Turnout		250,879	54.00%	
Total valid votes		250,879		
TDP gain from INC		Swing	▲5.81	

=== Assembly Election 2009 ===
2009 Andhra Pradesh Legislative Assembly election : L. B. Nagar
Party	Candidate	Votes	%	±%
INC	Devireddy Sudheer Reddy	67,510	34.52%	New
TDP	S. V. Krishna Prasad	54,368	27.80%	New
PRP	Sama Ranga Reddy	32,823	16.79%	New
LSP	Anugu Rama Rao	21,421	10.95%	New
BJP	Akula Ramesh Goud	14,666	7.50%	New
Margin of victory		13,142	6.72%	New
Turnout		195,572	55.00%	New
Total valid votes		195,572		
INC win		Swing	New	
