= List of by-elections to the Telangana Legislative Assembly =

The following is a list of by-elections held for the Telangana Legislative Assembly, India, since its formation in 2014.

== 1st Assembly ==
=== 2016 ===
S.No	Date	Constituency	MLA before election	Party before election	Elected MLA	Party after election
1	13 February 2016	Narayankhed	Patlolla Kishta Reddy	Indian National Congress	Mahareddy Bhupal Reddy	Bharat Rashtra Samithi
2	16 May 2016	Palair	Ramireddy Venkatareddy	Indian National Congress	Tummala Nageswara Rao	Bharat Rashtra Samithi

== 2nd Assembly ==
=== 2019 ===
S.No	Date	Constituency	MLA before election	Party before election	Elected MLA	Party after election
1	21 October 2019	Huzurnagar	N.Uttam Kumar Reddy	Indian National Congress	Shanampudi Saidireddy	Telangana Rashtra Samithi

=== 2020 ===
S.No	Date	Constituency	MLA before election	Party before election	Elected MLA	Party after election
1	3 November 2020	Dubbak	Solipeta Ramalinga Reddy	Bharat Rashtra Samithi	Madhavaneni Raghunandan Rao	Bharatiya Janata Party

=== 2021 ===
S.No	Date	Constituency	MLA before election	Party before election	Elected MLA	Party after election
87	17 April 2021	Nagarjuna Sagar	Nomula Narsimhaiah	Bharat Rashtra Samithi	Nomula Bhagath	Bharat Rashtra Samithi
31	30 October 2021	Huzurabad	Etela Rajender	Bharat Rashtra Samithi	Etela Rajender	Bharatiya Janata Party

=== 2022 ===
Date	S.No	Constituency	MLA before election	Party before election	Elected MLA	Party after election
3 November 2022	93	Munugode	Komatireddy Raj Gopal Reddy	Indian National Congress	Kusukuntla Prabhakar Reddy	Bharat Rashtra Samithi

== 3rd Assembly ==
=== 2024 ===
Date	Constituency		Previous MLA		Reason	Elected MLA	
13 May 2024	71	Secunderabad Cantonment	G. Lasya Nanditha	Bharat Rashtra Samithi	Died on 23 February 2024	Sri Ganesh	Indian National Congress

=== 2025 ===
Date	Constituency		Previous MLA		Reason	Elected MLA	
11 November 2025	61	Jubilee Hills	Maganti Gopinath	Bharat Rashtra Samithi	Died on 8 June 2025	Naveen Yadav Vallala	Indian National Congress
