= Malkajgiri Lok Sabha constituency =

Constituency of the Indian parliament in Telangana

Coordinates: 17.45°N 78.53°E

Malkajgiri TG-7
- Lok Sabha constituency
- Boundary of Malkajgiri Constituency in Telangana

Constituency details
- Country: India
- Region: South India
- State: Telangana
- Assembly constituencies: Medchal; Malkajgiri; Quthbullapur; Kukatpally; Uppal; Lal Bahadur Nagar; Secunderabad Cantt.
- Established: 2008
- Total electors: 3,150,303
- Reservation: None

Member of Parliament
- 18th Lok Sabha
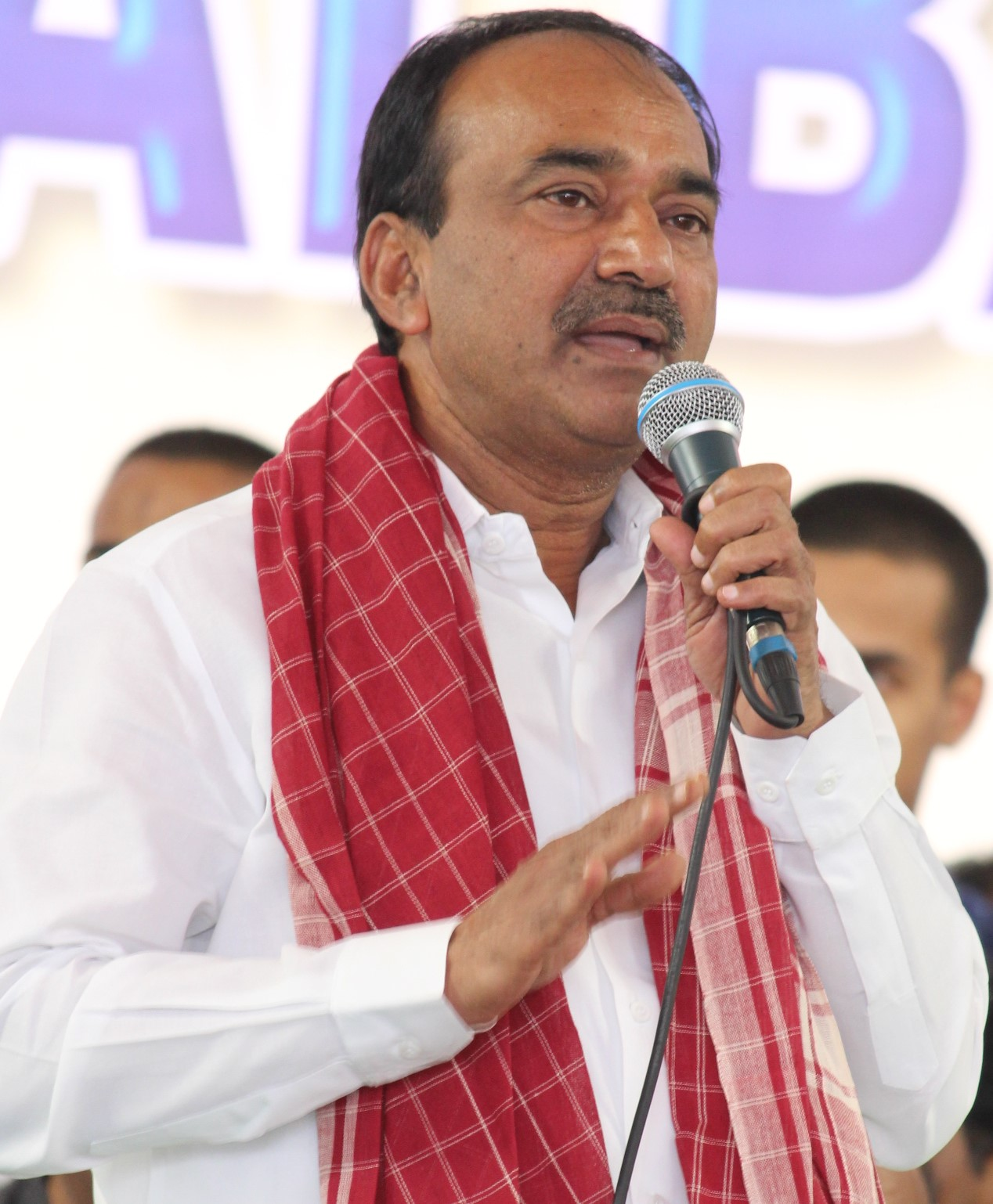
- Incumbent Etela Rajender
- Party: BJP
- Alliance: NDA
- Elected year: 2024
- Preceded by: Revanth Reddy, INC

Malkajgiri Lok Sabha constituency is one of the 17 Lok Sabha (lower house of the Indian Parliament) constituencies in the Indian state of Telangana. This constituency came into existence in 2008, following the implementation of delimitation of parliamentary constituencies based on the recommendations of the Delimitation Commission of India constituted in 2002.

As of 2019, Malkajgiri is the largest Lok Sabha constituency by number of electors with 3,150,303. It first held elections in 2009 as a constituency of the South Indian state of Andhra Pradesh and its first member of parliament (MP) was Sarvey Sathyanarayana of the Indian National Congress. The new state of Telangana was created in 2014 by the implementation of the Andhra Pradesh Reorganisation Act, 2014 and this constituency became part of it. From 2014 to 2019, its MP was Malla Reddy who represented the Telugu Desam Party at the election. In 2016, Malla Reddy switched parties to represent the Telangana Rashtra Samithi. Its current MP is Etela Rajender of the Bharatiya Janata Party.

Most successful political parties
1. INC (2 terms) (50.0%)
2. TDP (1 term) (25.0%)
3. BJP (1 term) (25.0%)

== Assembly segments ==
Malkajgiri Lok Sabha constituency comprises the following seven Legislative Assembly segments:

No	Name	District	Member	Party	Leading (in 2024)
43	Medchal	Medchal–Malkajgiri	Malla Reddy	BRS	BJP
44	Malkajgiri	Medchal–Malkajgiri	Marri Rajasekhar Reddy	BRS	BJP
45	Quthbullapur	Medchal–Malkajgiri	K. P. Vivekanand Goud	BRS	BJP
46	Kukatpally	Medchal–Malkajgiri	Madhavaram Krishna Rao	BRS	BJP
47	Uppal	Medchal–Malkajgiri	Bandari Lakshma Reddy	BRS	BJP
49	Lal Bahadur Nagar	Ranga Reddy	Devireddy Sudheer Reddy	BRS	BJP
71	Secunderabad Cantt. (SC)	Hyderabad	Sri Ganesh	INC	BJP

== Members of Parliament ==
Year	Member	Party
1952 – 2008 : Constituency did not exist
Andhra Pradesh
2009	Sarve Satyanarayana	Indian National Congress
Telangana
2014	Chamakura Malla Reddy	Telugu Desam Party
2019	Anumula Revanth Reddy	Indian National Congress
2024	Etela Rajender	Bharatiya Janata Party

== Election results ==
=== 2024 ===
2024 Indian general election: Malkajgiri
Party	Candidate	Votes	%	±%
BJP	Etela Rajender	991,042	51.25	▲31.78
INC	Patnam Sunitha Mahender Reddy	599,567	31.00	▼7.63
BRS	Ragidi Laxma Reddy	300,486	15.54	▼22.39
NOTA	None of the above	13,366	0.69	N/A
Majority		391,475	20.25	▲19.55
Turnout		1,938,462	51.28	▲1.65
BJP gain from INC		Swing		

=== General election, 2019 ===
2019 Indian general election: Malkajgiri
Party	Candidate	Votes	%	±%
INC	Anumula Revanth Reddy	603,748	38.63	▲24.21
TRS	Marri Rajashekar Reddy	592,829	37.93	▲7.39
BJP	Naraparaju Ramchander Rao	304,282	19.47	N/A
JSP	Bongunoori Mahender Reddy	28,420	1.82	N/A
NOTA	None of the above	17,895	1.14	N/A
Majority		10,919	0.70	▼1.06
Turnout		1,563,646	49.63	▼1.27
INC gain from TDP		Swing		

=== General election, 2014 ===
2014 Indian general election: Malkajgiri
Party	Candidate	Votes	%	±%
TDP	Chamakura Malla Reddy	523,336	32.30	▲7.83
TRS	Mynampally Hanmanth Rao	494,965	30.54	N/A
INC	Sarve Satyanarayana	233,711	14.42	▼17.79
LSP	Jayaprakash Narayan	158,243	9.77	▲0.73
YSRCP	V. Dinesh Reddy	115,710	7.14	N/A
AIMIM	Divakar Dharanikota Sudhakar	18,543	1.14	N/A
IND.	K. Nageshwar	13,236	0.82	N/A
Margin of victory		28,371	1.76	▼5.98
Turnout		1,620,397	50.90	▼0.56
TDP gain from INC		Swing		

=== General election, 2009 ===
2009 Indian general election: Malkajgiri
Party	Candidate	Votes	%	±%
INC	Sarvey Sathyanarayana	388,368	32.21	
TDP	T. Bheemsen	295,042	24.47	
PRP	Tulla Devender Goud	238,886	19.81	
Margin of victory		93,226	7.74	
Turnout		1,205,714	51.46	
INC win (new seat)				

== See also ==
- Rangareddy district
- Ladakh Lok Sabha constituency
- Lakshadweep Lok Sabha constituency
- List of constituencies of the Lok Sabha
