= Uppal Assembly constituency =

Constituency of the Telangana legislative assembly in India

Coordinates: 17.40°N 78.56°E

Uppal
- Constituency No. 47 for the Telangana Legislative Assembly
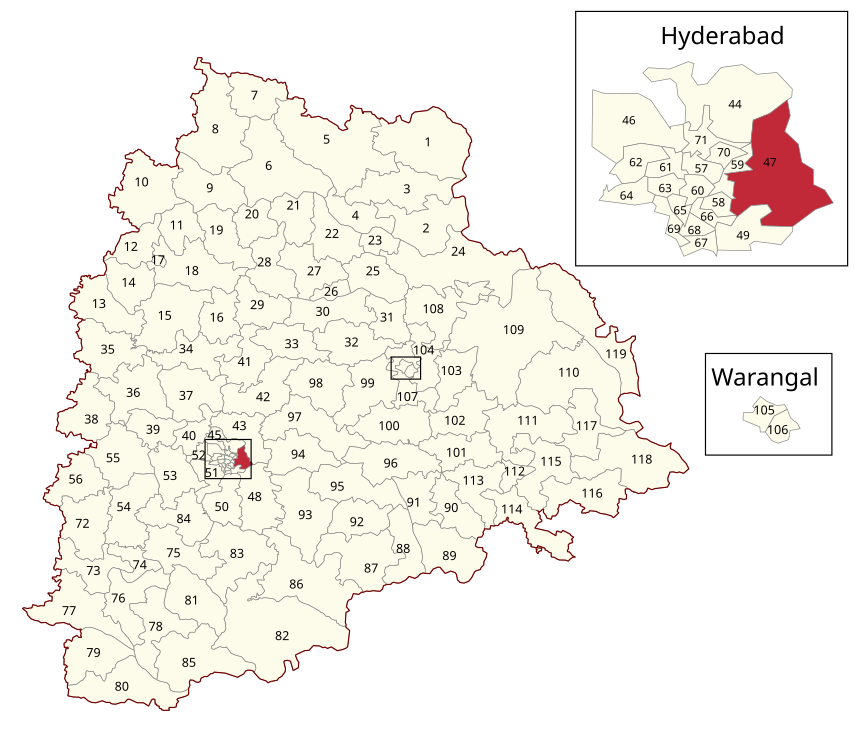
- Location of Uppal Assembly constituency within Telangana

Constituency details
- Country: India
- Region: South India
- State: Telangana
- District: Medchal-Malkajgiri
- Lok Sabha constituency: Malkajgiri
- Established: 2008
- Total electors: 4,54,690
- Reservation: None

Member of Legislative Assembly
- 3rd Telangana Legislative Assembly
- Incumbent Bandari Lakshma Reddy
- Party: Bharat Rashtra Samithi
- Elected year: 2023

Uppal Assembly constituency is a constituency of Telangana Legislative Assembly, India. It is one of 14 constituencies in Ranga Reddy district part of Malkajgiri Lok Sabha constituency. It is also one of the 24 constituencies of GHMC.

Bandari Lakshma Reddy is the current MLA from this constituency.

== Overview ==
The Assembly Constituency presently comprises the following localities.

Mandal/Ward No
Uppal
Kapra

== Members of Legislative Assembly ==
Duration	Member	Political party
Andhra Pradesh
2009-14	Bandari Raji Reddy	Indian National Congress
Telangana
2014-18	N. V. S. S. Prabhakar	Bharatiya Janata Party
2018-23	Bethi Subhas Reddy	Telangana Rashtra Samithi
2023-	Bandari Lakshma Reddy	Bharat Rashtra Samithi

== Election results ==
=== 2023 ===
2023 Telangana Legislative Assembly election: Uppal
Party	Candidate	Votes	%	±%
BRS	Bandari Lakshma Reddy	132,927	48.33	
INC	M. Parmeshwar Reddy	83,897	30.51	
BJP	N. V. S. S. Prabhakar	47,332	17.21	
NOTA	None of the Above	2,536	0.92	
Majority		49,030	17.82	
Turnout		2,75,085	51.94	
BRS hold		Swing		

=== 2018 ===
2018 Telangana Legislative Assembly election: Uppal
Party	Candidate	Votes	%	±%
TRS	Bethi Subhas Reddy	117,442	51.53%	+21.8
TDP	Tulla Veerender Goud	69,274	30.40%	new
BJP	N. V. S. S. Prabhakar	26,798	11.19%	−24.9
NOTA	None of the Above	2,712	1.19 %	
Majority		48,168	21.4%	+15.1
Turnout		2,27,899	51.65%	−0.7
TRS gain from BJP		Swing		

=== 2014 ===
2014 Telangana Legislative Assembly election: Uppal
Party	Candidate	Votes	%	±%
BJP	N. V. S. S. Prabhakar	82,395	36.8%	
TRS	Bethi Subhas Reddy	68,226	30.4%	
INC	Bandari Lakshma Reddy	34,331	15.3%	
Majority		14,169	6.3%	
Turnout		2,25,935	49.7%	
BJP gain from INC		Swing		

=== 2009 ===
2009 Andhra Pradesh Legislative Assembly election: Uppal
Party	Candidate	Votes	%	±%
INC	Bandari Raji Reddy	57,874	37.7%	
TRS	M. Yadagiri Reddy	29,691	19.34%	
PRP	Amirishetty Narender	25,634	16.7%	
Majority		28,183	18.36%	
Turnout		1,53,500	42.39%	
INC win (new seat)				

== See also ==
- Uppal
- List of constituencies of Telangana Legislative Assembly
