= Medchal Assembly constituency =

Constituency of the Telangana Legislative Assembly, India

Coordinates: 17.63°N 78.49°E

Medchal
- Constituency No. 43 for the Telangana Legislative Assembly
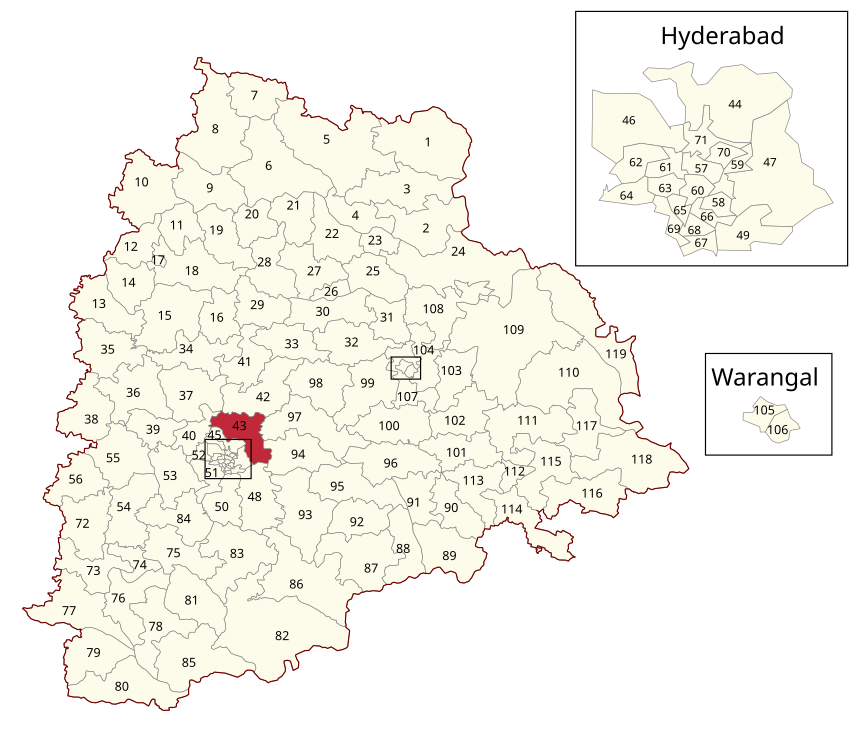
- Location of Medchal Assembly constituency within Telangana

Constituency details
- Country: India
- Region: South India
- State: Telangana
- District: Medchal–Malkajgiri
- Lok Sabha constituency: Malkajgiri
- Established: 1951
- Total electors: 432,202
- Reservation: None

Member of Legislative Assembly
- 3rd Telangana Legislative Assembly
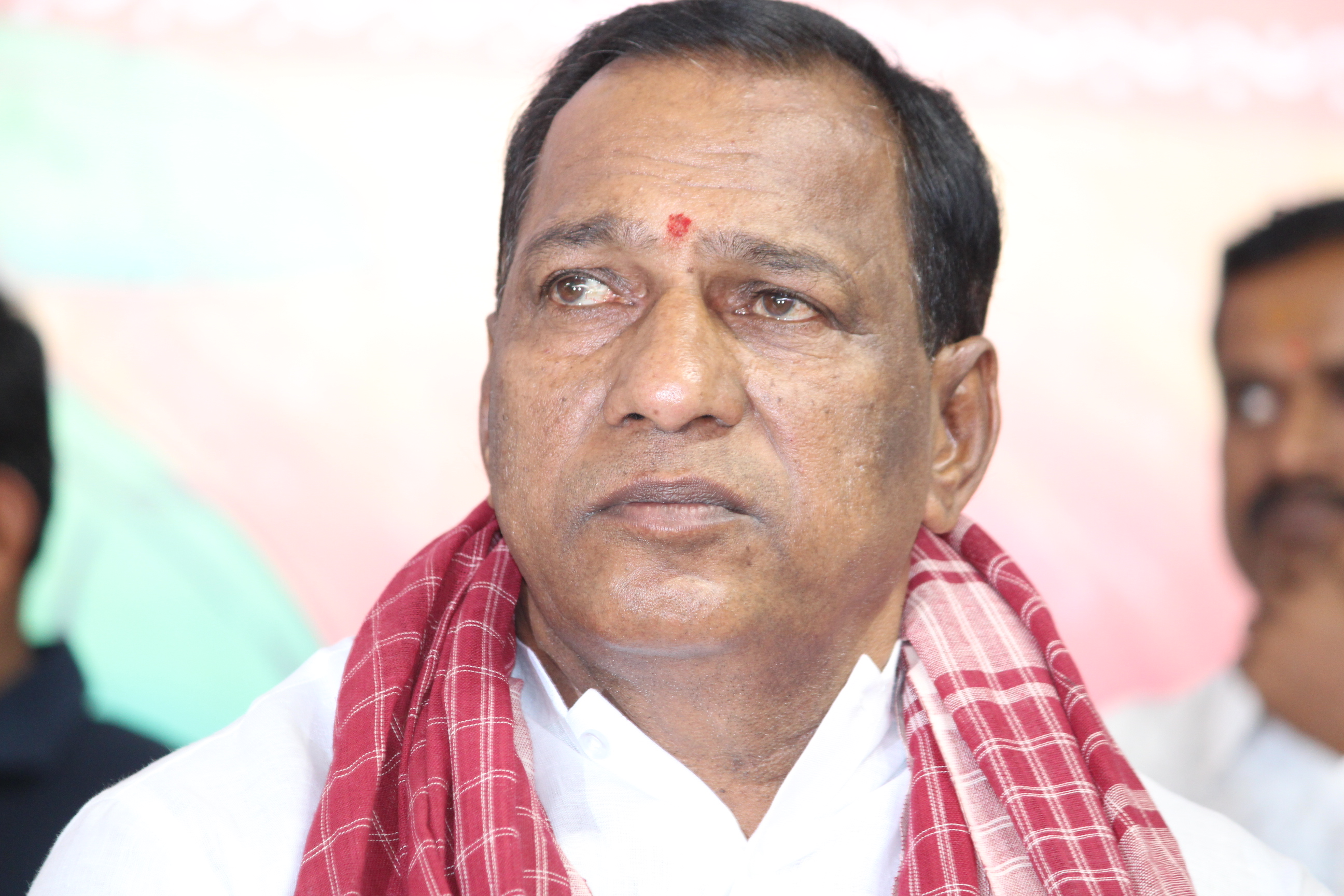
- Incumbent Chamakura Malla Reddy
- Party: BRS
- Elected year: 2018

Medchal Assembly constituency is a constituency in Medchal–Malkajgiri district of Telangana that elects representatives to the Telangana Legislative Assembly in India. It is one of the seven assembly segments of Malkajgiri Lok Sabha constituency.

Chamakura Malla Reddy is the current MLA of the constituency, having won the 2018 Telangana Legislative Assembly election from Bharat Rashtra Samithi. As of 2018, there are a total of 432,202 electors in the constituency.

== Mandals ==
The assembly constituency presently comprises the following mandals:

Mandal
Medchal
Shamirpet
Ghatkesar
Keesara
Medipally
Kapra
Muduchinthalapalli

== Members of the Legislative Assembly ==
Year	Member	Political party
Hyderabad State
1952	Varakantam Gopal Reddy	Indian National Congress
United Andhra Pradesh
1962	V. Ramchandra Rao	Independent
1967	Sumitra Devi	Indian National Congress
1972	Sumitra Devi	Indian National Congress
1978	Marri Chenna Reddy	Indian National Congress
1983	Singireddy Uma Venkatarama Reddy	Indian National Congress
1985	Kommareddy Surender Reddy	Telugu Desam Party
1989	Singireddy Uma Venkatarama Reddy	Indian National Congress
1994	Tulla Devender Goud	Telugu Desam Party
1999	Tulla Devender Goud	Telugu Desam Party
2004	Tulla Devender Goud	Telugu Desam Party
2009	Kichannagari Laxma Reddy	Indian National Congress
Telangana
2014	Malipedhi Sudheer Reddy	Telangana Rashtra Samithi
2018	Chamakura Malla Reddy	Telangana Rashtra Samithi
2023	Chamakura Malla Reddy	Bharat Rashtra Samithi

== Election results ==
=== 2023 ===
2023 Telangana Legislative Assembly election: Medchal
Party	Candidate	Votes	%	±%
BRS	Chamakura Malla Reddy	186,017	46.44	
INC	Thotakura Vajresh Yadav	1,52,598	38.10	
BJP	Yenugu Sudharshan Reddy	50,535	12.62	
NOTA	None of the Above	3,737	0.93	
Majority		33,479		
Turnout		4,00,602	62.79	
BRS hold		Swing		

=== 2018 ===
2018 Telangana Legislative Assembly election: Medchal
Party	Candidate	Votes	%	±%
TRS	Chamakura Malla Reddy	167,324	54.98	
INC	Kichannagari Laxma Reddy	79,334	26.07	
BJP	Peddi Mohan Reddy	48,870	16.05	
NOTA	None of the Above	3,402	1.12	
Majority		87,990	28.91	
Turnout		3,04,361	60.72	
TRS hold		Swing		

=== 2014 ===
2014 Telangana Legislative Assembly election: Medchal
Party	Candidate	Votes	%	±%
TRS	Malipedhi Sudheer Reddy	114,235	43.41	
TDP	Thotakura Jangaiah Yadav	70,780	26.90	
INC	Kichannagari Laxma Reddy	58,016	22.05	
LSP	Dr. G. R. Linga Murthy	5,076	1.93	
Independent	B. Beenu Prakash	4,856	1.85	
CPI(M)	Chinthala Yadaiah	1,615	0.61	
BSP	Bakkola Ram Mohan	1,327	0.50	
NOTA	None of the above	1,308	0.50	
Majority		43,455	16.51	
Turnout		2,63,134	60.87	
TRS gain from INC		Swing		

=== 2009 ===
2009 Andhra Pradesh Legislative Assembly election: Medchal
Party	Candidate	Votes	%	±%
INC	Kichannagari Laxma Reddy	69,312	36.25	
TDP	Nakka Prabhakar Goud	63,742	33.34	
PRP	Thotakura Jangaiah Yadav	38,866	20.33	
Majority		5,570	2.91	
Turnout		1,91,189	60.64	

== See also ==
- Medchal
- List of constituencies of Telangana Legislative Assembly
