= B. Raji Reddy =

Indian politician (1944/1945–2025)

Bandari Raji Reddy

Member of the Andhra Pradesh Legislative Assembly for Uppal
- In office 2009–2014
- Preceded by: Constituency established
- Succeeded by: N. V. S. S. Prabhakar

Personal details
- Born: 12 Feb 1948 Nacharam, Hyderabad, Hyderabad State, India
- Died: 8 May 2025 (aged 80) Hyderabad, Telangana, India
- Party: Indian National Congress
- Relatives: Bandari Lakshma Reddy (brother)
- Occupation: Politician

Bandari Raji Reddy (1944 or 1945 – 8 May 2025) was an Indian politician. He was elected as the Member of the Legislative Assembly for Uppal constituency in Telangana, India. He was member of the Indian National Congress party.

== Political career ==
Bandari Rajireddy entered politics through the Congress Party. He worked in various capacities within the Congress Party in the erstwhile Rangareddy district. He served as the Chairman of Kapra Municipality. In the 2009 Andhra Pradesh Assembly elections, he contested as the Congress Party candidate from the Uppal constituency and won against his nearest rival, Telangana Rashtra Samithi candidate Muthireddy Yadagiri Reddy, with a majority of 28,183 votes, becoming an MLA for the first time. He also served as a member of the Tirumala Tirupati Devasthanam Board in 2012.

In the 2014 Telangana Assembly elections, he did not contest but supported his brother Bandari Lakshma Reddy as the candidate.

== Death ==
Reddy died due to age-related health issues at his residence in Habsiguda, on 8 May 2025, at the age of 80.
