= Nava Telangana Praja Party =

Defunct Indian political party

- Abbreviation: NTPP
- President: Tulla Devender Goud
- Founder: Tulla Devender Goud
- Founded: 11 July 2008 (18 years ago)
- Dissolved: 26 February 2009 (17 years ago)
- Split from: Telugu Desam Party
- Merged into: Praja Rajyam Party
- Colours: Turquoise
- ECI status: Dissolved

Nava Telangana Party (abbr. NTPP) was a regional political party in the Indian state of Andhra Pradesh. It was founded on 11 June 2008 by Tulla Devender Goud, a member of the Telugu Desam Party (TDP), with the aim of creating a separate Telangana state from Andhra Pradesh. The party eventually merged with the Praja Rajyam Party (PRP) on 26 February 2009.

== History ==
The party was founded on 11 July 2008 by Tulla Devender Goud, a member of TDP and former Minister for Home Affairs of Andhra Pradesh, along with other leaders, including E. Peddi Reddy. Goud resigned from the TDP, for its perceived ambiguity regarding the demand for a separate Telangana state. The party adopted a flag featuring a map of Telangana surrounded by the colour blue, symbolising the region's major rivers the Godavari and the Krishna, as well as the Indian roller bird. The interior of the map was brown, representing the land and contained a plough, spade, book, and torch, symbolising farmers, workers, students and youth.

The party's headquarters was inaugurated on 14 August 2008 by the mothers of two Telangana statehood activists who died during the 1969 Telangana Agitation.

Alongside the Telangana Rashtra Samithi, the party advocated for the creation of a separate Telangana state. On 2 November, it proclaimed self-rule for Telangana, declaring its support for a separate state.

Although the party initially planned to contest the 2009 Andhra Pradesh Legislative Assembly election, on 26 February 2009 due to financial constraints, it merged with the newly formed PRP, led by actor-turned-politician Chiranjeevi. Following the merger, Goud was appointed as vice-president of the PRP and unsuccessfully contested from the Ibrahimpatnam Assembly constituency and the Malkajgiri Lok Sabha constituency. He and Reddy subsequently rejoined the TDP on 3 August 2009. Goud was later elected to the Rajya Sabha in 2012 from TDP.

== See also ==
- Politics of India
- Elections in India
- Politics of Andhra Pradesh
- Elections in Andhra Pradesh
- List of political parties in India
