= Andhra Pradesh Auto and Trolley Drivers Union =

Trade union in India

APATDU
- Andhra Pradesh Auto and Trolley Drivers Union
- Headquarters: M.G.M 2nd Gate Adda, MG Rd; Sherpura, Warangal; Telangana
- Location: India

The Andhra Pradesh Auto and Trolley Drivers Union (APATDU) is a trade union of auto rickshaw and trolley drivers in Andhra Pradesh, India. APATDU is affiliated with the Centre of Indian Trade Unions.

== History ==
In May 2002, APATDU criticised police for the detainment of vehicles to collect fines from their drivers. The union demanded a stop to the detainment and threatened a demonstration if the demand would not be met. On 23 July, APATDU led a protest in Hyderabad.

In February 2003, APATDU called for a four-day strike in Hyderabad against police harassment, illegal imposition of fines and the groundless seizure of cars. The strike was called off following a meeting of general secretary Bhoopal with home minister Devender Goud.

In 2013, APATDU took part in a general transport strike in Hyderabad, demanding the instatement of a welfare board.
