= Sai Baba Temple, Dilsukhnagar =

Sai Baba Temple

Religion
- Affiliation: Hinduism
- District: Ranga Reddy
- Deity: Sai Baba
- Festivals: Guru Purnima, Sri Rama Navami

Location
- Location: Dilsukhnagar, Hyderabad
- State: Telangana
- Country: India
- Interactive map of Sai Baba Temple
- Coordinates: 17°22′4.3″N 78°31′38.2″E

Architecture
- Completed: 1980

Sai Baba Temple is a Hindu temple of Sai Baba located in Dilsukhnagar, Hyderabad, India. It is one of the most popular temples in Hyderabad.

== History ==
The temple has become popular since the 1990s, especially on Thursdays.

Everyday Marathi Pooja and Aarati are performed in the mornings and evenings, for which huge turn out of devotees is witnessed.

== Terrorist bombings ==
The first bombing at the temple took place in November 2002. A bomb exploded in November 2002 injuring seven people. It was initially a target in 2013 Hyderabad blasts, but later withdrew because of the security at the temple.
