= G. Bikshapathy =

Indian judge

G. Bikshapathy is a retired justice of High Court of Andhra Pradesh in India. He was elevated to the constitutional post as additional judge of Andhra Pradesh High Court in 1995 and then as judge in 1997 till he retired in 2005. He is a supporter of weaker sections and dealt extensively with labour and service matters. He advocated taking up the cases on behalf of both national and state level trade unions.

== Personal details ==
G. Bikshapathy was born on May 3, 1943, at Karmanghat village, then district of Hyderabad, now in Telangana.

== Professional career ==
After finishing his diploma in commerce in 1962, he worked for 13 years in various departments of public sector companies. While working, he obtained his B.Com at evening college. Later, he passed his LLB and then a master's degree in labour laws.

He started working as advocate from 1975, working mainly on labour and service related cases. He was a trusted advocate for handling cases related to trade unions at both state and national levels.

Later he worked for a short period as a government pleader in the High Court of Andhra Pradesh and was a legal advisor to several undertakings, both in the private and public sector.

On May 2, 1995, he was appointed as additional judge of Andhra Pradesh High Court. He became a judge there in 1997 and retired on May 3, 2005.

He also acted as chairman of a fact-finding committee to investigate the allegations on Y. S. Rajasekhara Reddy, a former chief minister of Andhra Pradesh for his support to sell 7000 acres of Tirupati temple lands and illegal encroachment by churches and its missionaries. The committee also investigated allegations of the church carrying out evangelical activities on Tirupati hills associated with Hindu community with the support of Reddy and his son-in-law Anil Kumar, a Brahmin-convert evangelist and preacher. The committee reported its findings after conducting a public enquiry.
