= Malipedhi Sudheer Reddy =

Indian politician

Malipedhi Sudheer Reddy (born 10 April 1955) is an Indian politician from Telangana state. He was a former member of the Telangana Legislative Assembly from Medchal Assembly constituency, in Ranga Reddy district, representing the Bharat Rashtra Samithi.

== Early life ==
Reddy was born on 10 April 1955 in Pratap Singaram village, Ghatkesar mandal, Ranga Reddy District. Telangana state to the late M Chandra Shekar Reddy. He completed his schooling in the Zilla Parishad High School and later did intermediate at the Government Multipurpose College, Nalgonda, Andhra Pradesh in 1969. He did Bachelor of Science in agriculture at a college affiliated with Osmania University. He declared assets worth Rs.3 crore in his affidavit to the Election Commission of India.

== Career ==
Reddy won from Medchal Assembly constituency representing the Telangana Rashra Samithi in the 2014 Andhra Pradesh Legislative Assembly election, which was held concurrently for both the Andhra Pradesh and Telangana legislatures after the bifurcation of the state. He polled 1,14,235 votes and defeated his nearest rival, Thotakura Jangaiah Yadav of the Telugu Desam Party, by a margin of 43,455 votes.

He started his political life as a sarpanch of Pratap Singaram village from 1981 to 1985. From 1988 to 1994, he served as the vice president, and as president in 2001, of the Mandal Praja Parishad of Ghatkesar.
