= Goud (surname) =

Goud is a surname. Notable people with the surname include:

- Devender Goud (born 1953), Indian politician
- Muralidhar Goud, Indian actor
