= Malla Reddy =

Indian politician (born 1953)

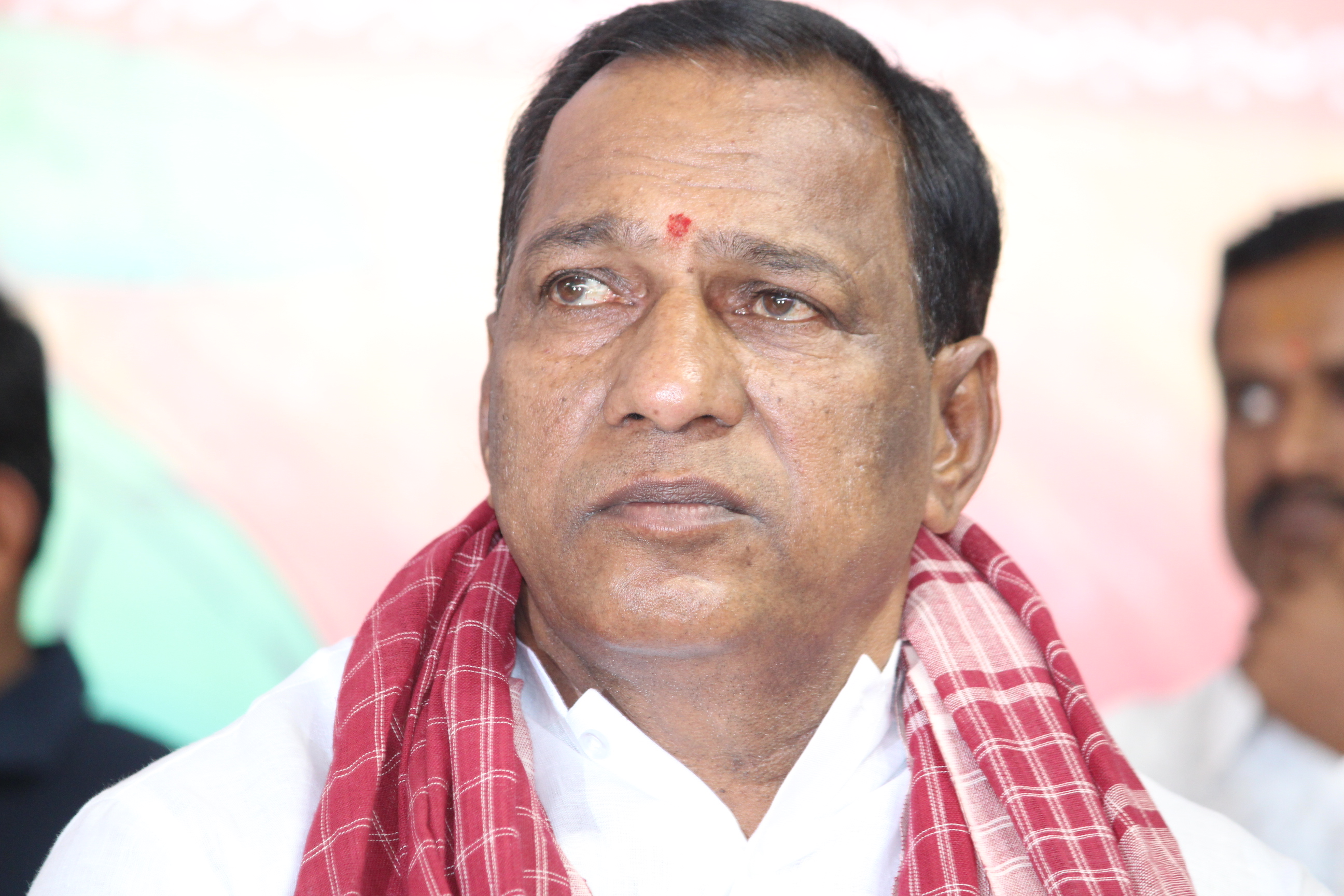

Minister of Labour, Employment and Factories Government of Telangana
- In office 19 February 2019 – 6 December 2023
- Governor: ▪︎ E. S. L. Narasimhan; ▪︎ Tamilisai Soundararajan
- Chief Minister: K. Chandrasekhar Rao
- Preceded by: Naini Narshimha Reddy
- Succeeded by: Chief Minister of Telangana

Member of Telangana Legislative Assembly
- Incumbent
- Assumed office 11 December 2018
- Preceded by: Malipedhi Sudheer Reddy
- Constituency: Medchal

Member of Parliament, Lok Sabha
- In office 16 May 2014 – 11 December 2018
- Preceded by: Sarvey Sathyanarayana
- Succeeded by: Revanth Reddy
- Constituency: Malkajgiri, Telangana

Personal details
- Born: 9 September 1953 (age 73) Hyderabad, Andhra Pradesh, India (Present day Telangana, India)
- Party: Bharat Rashtra Samithi (2016 – present)
- Other political affiliations: Telugu Desam Party (2014-2016)
- Spouse: Kalpana Reddy
- Children: 2 sons and 1 daughter
- Profession: Politician, Educationalist, Entrepreneur, Social worker

Chamakura Malla Reddy is an Indian politician who served as the Minister of Labour and Employment in Telangana, having assumed office from 2019 to 2023. He is the Member of Legislative Assembly from Medchal Assembly constituency. His children are Mamatha Reddy, Mahender Reddy, and Dr. Bhadra Reddy. He was the Member of Parliament in the Lok Sabha from Malkajgiri. He is a member of the Bharat Rashtra Samithi. He is an educationist and a businessman in Telangana state. He is the founder and chairman of numerous colleges and research institutes including Malla Reddy Health City, Malla Reddy Engineering College, Malla Reddy Vishwavidyapeeth and Malla Reddy University.

== Electoral history ==
Year	Constituency	Party	Votes	%	Opponent	Opponent Party	Opponent Votes	%	Result	Margin	%
2014	Malkajgiri	TDP	523,336	32.30%	Mynampally Hanumanth Rao	TRS	494,965	30.54%	Won	28,371	1.76%
2018	Medchal	TRS	167,324	54.98%	Kichannagari Laxma Reddy	INC	79,334	26.07%	Won	87,990	28.91%
2023	Medchal	BRS	186,017	46.44%	Thotakura Vajresh Yadav	INC	152,598	38.10%	Won	33,419	8.34%

== Early life ==
Malla Reddy was born on 9 September 1953. He was born and brought up in Bowenpally. He studied in Wesley Boys High School and intermediate in Mahabubia Junior Boys College.

== Political career ==
On 19 March 2014, he joined the Telugu Desam Party. He was selected by the party to contest a seat on 9 April 2014 and on 16 May 2014 went on to be elected as member of parliament for Malkajgiri. He was the only Member of Parliament for the Telugu Desam Party to win a seat in Telangana. In June 2016, Malla Reddy switched parties to the Bharat Rashtra Samithi. He is the minister of Minister for Labour & Employment, Factories, Skill Development, Women and Child Welfare in Telangana State Government. He was formally inducted in the Cabinet on 19 February 2019.

In May 2024, Malla Reddy and his son-in-law were taken into custody and released amid a land dispute over alleged illegal encroachment.

== Controversies ==
=== College Blacklisted ===
Due to inconsistencies in the self-study report that Malla Reddy College of Engineering in Dhulapally, Hyderabad, Telangana, submitted for reevaluation, the National Assessment and Accreditation Council (NAAC) has blacklisted the college from the accreditation process for five years. In its letter submitted to the college dated 24 December 2020, NAAC highlighted that the certificates allegedly given by BHEL, Yash Technologies and Airtel, "appear to be fabricated in layer, especially with regard to the aspects of seal, signature and letterhead". The letter expands on experts' opinions that the submitted certificates were digitally fabricated.

At the 88th NAAC Executive Committee meeting that was organized on 20 November 2020, these inconsistencies and discrepancies were discussed and a resolution was passed to blacklist the college.

=== Land Dispute Case ===
Malla Reddy, his son-in-law Rajashekar Reddy, and their followers had been taken into custody on 19 May 2024, at a local police station while attempting to illegally enter private property and getting rid of the boundary fence.

=== University Admissions Scandal ===
Based on a petition filed by Naveena Educational Society, Malla Reddy University has set up an off-campus centre at Balanagar, Hyderabad, Telangana, with the name "Centre of Excellence for Commerce and Design", providing courses which include Bachelor of Commerce and Bachelor of Science without obtaining mandatory approvals as per UGC guidelines and Private University's Act. On 5 July 2024, the Telangana High Court took a stern view at these violations and issued orders for UGC, AICTE and the Telangana Council of Higher Education for necessary actions to be taken against the university and its off campus centre.
