= R. Krishnaiah =

Indian politician

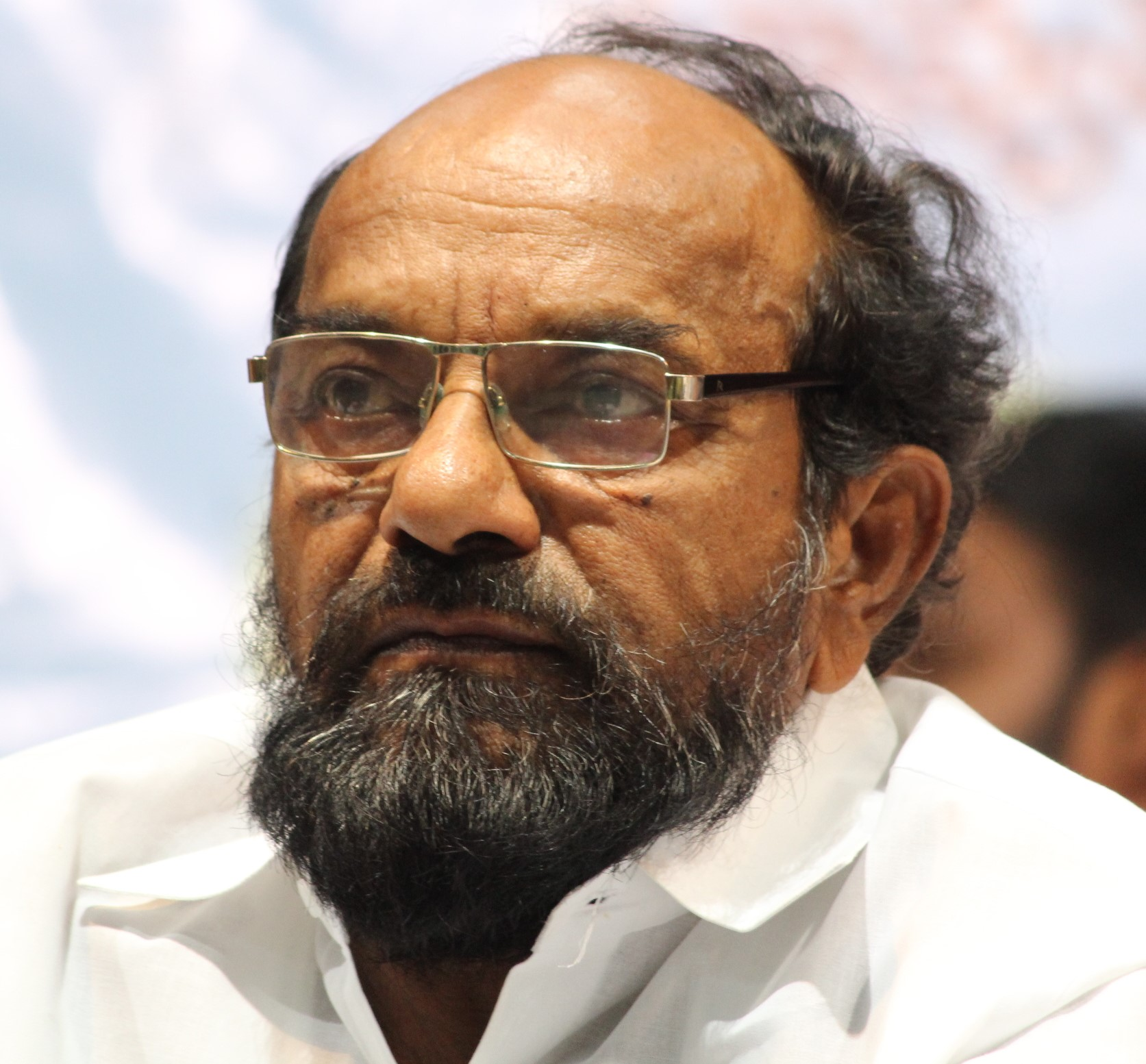

Member of Parliament, Rajya Sabha
- Incumbent
- Assumed office 14 December 2024
- Constituency: Andhra Pradesh
- In office 22 June 2022 – 23 September 2024
- Preceded by: Suresh Prabhu
- Constituency: Andhra Pradesh

Member of Legislative Assembly, Telangana
- In office 2 June 2014 – 11 December 2018
- Preceded by: Devireddy Sudheer Reddy
- Succeeded by: Devireddy Sudheer Reddy
- Constituency: Lal Bahadur Nagar

Personal details
- Born: 13 September 1954 (age 72) Rallagudpally Village, Mominpet Mandalam, Vikarabad district, Telangana
- Party: Bharatiya Janata Party (since 2024)
- Other political affiliations: YSR Congress Party (2022–2024); Telugu Desam Party (until 2019)
- Spouse: Shabari Devi
- Children: 2
- Parent: Adivappa Goud (father)

Ryaga Krishnaiah (born 13 September 1954), known as R. Krishnaiah, is an Indian politician and social activist.

Krishnaiah's political career gained prominence when he was elected as the Member of the Legislative Assembly (MLA) from the L.B. Nagar constituency in 2014, representing the Telugu Desam Party.

In 2022, Krishnaiah furthered his political career by being elected to the Rajya Sabha as a representative of the YSR Congress Party from 2022 until 2024.

Ryaga Krishnaiah resigned from the Upper House Rajya Sabha on 24 September 2024. He was nominated to Rajyasabha by BJP on December 10 and elected uncontested to the Rajya Sabha on December 13.

== Early life and education ==
In addition to his work with OBC unions, Krishnaiah serves as the President of the Social Welfare Hostel Union. This organization represents 1.4 million hostel students from Scheduled Castes (SCs), Scheduled Tribes (STs), and OBCs.

His political career includes serving as a Member of the Legislative Assembly (MLA) from 2014 to 2018. In 2014, he was nominated as the Chief Ministerial candidate for Telangana by both the Telugu Desam Party (TDP) and the Bharatiya Janata Party (BJP), reflecting his widespread influence and leadership. Over the years, Krishnaiah has also been actively involved with organizations like the Rashtriya Swayamsevak Sangh (RSS), Akhil Bharatiya Vidyarthi Parishad (ABVP), and the Andhra Pradesh Social Welfare Hostel Students Union.

== Early Activism and Educational Reforms ==
In 1976, Krishnaiah began his campaign for separate hostels for high school students, which resulted in the Andhra Pradesh government establishing between 300 and 500 new hostels annually. Today, over 5,000 hostels provide free food and accommodation to more than 500,000 students from BC, SC, and ST communities.

He also successfully led agitations to secure scholarships for poor students in junior colleges, degree colleges, and universities, which did not exist before 1976. Additionally, Krishnaiah's efforts resulted in the construction of over 600 residential colleges across Andhra Pradesh and Telangana, offering educational opportunities to students from weaker sections.

== Reservation Advocacy ==
In 1980, Krishnaiah spearheaded the movement to implement reservations for BC students in private engineering colleges in Andhra Pradesh. Despite an attempt by private engineering management to offer him ₹15 lakhs as a bribe, he refused and continued to push for reform, resulting in the successful implementation of reservations.

From 1989 to 1993, Krishnaiah fought for reservations in village panchayat sarpanch posts for BCs, leading to the government conceding 34% reservations. His activism extended to mandal parishad, zilla parishad, and municipal elections, where he secured 20% reservations for BCs in 1996 after a series of protests directed at the then Chief Minister, N. T. Rama Rao.

== Implementation of Mandal Commission Recommendations ==
Krishnaiah's most significant national recognition came in 1990 when he led successful protests in Andhra Pradesh for the implementation of the Mandal Commission recommendations. This victory established his influence on a national level, allowing him to directly submit memorandums and recommendations on behalf of the backward classes to state and national authorities, including the Prime Minister and the President of India.

== Other Campaigns ==
In 1996, Krishnaiah led protests by sarpanches from Andhra Pradesh demanding specific check power rights. The movement culminated in a successful negotiation with the state government, further cementing Krishnaiah's role as a champion of rural leadership.

Krishnaiah has also been involved in various legal battles and protests, including a fight against the construction of the Almatti Dam and the campaign to ban single-number lotteries in Andhra Pradesh. Over his four-decade-long career, his activism has led to the issuance of over 2,000 Government Orders (GOs), addressing welfare, education, public health, and social justice issues.

== Awards ==
- National Ambedkar Award (2003)
- National Mahatma Jyothi Rao Pule Award (2011)
