= G. Sayanna =

Indian politician (1951–2023)

Member of Legislative Assembly, Telangana
- In office 2 June 2014 – 19 February 2023
- Preceded by: Telangana Assembly Created
- Succeeded by: G. Lasya Nanditha
- Constituency: Secunderabad Cantonment

Member of Legislative Assembly Andhra Pradesh
- In office 1994 - 2009
- Preceded by: D. Narsing Rao
- Succeeded by: P. Shankar Rao
- Constituency: Secunderabad Cantonment

Personal details
- Born: 5 March 1951 Valbhapur, Nizamabad, Telangana
- Died: 19 February 2023 (aged 71) Hyderabad
- Party: Bharat Rashtra Samithi
- Other political affiliations: Telugu Desam Party
- Spouse: Geetha
- Children: 3 daughters, including G. Lasya Nanditha
- Parent(s): Sayanna, Bhudevi

G. Sayanna (5 March 1951 – 19 February 2023) was an Indian politician from Telangana state. He hailed from the Scheduled Caste community and won Secunderabad Cantonment Assembly constituency reserved seat five times.

== Early life ==
G. Sayanna was born to Sayanna (Sr.) and Bhudevi in 1951 at Valbhapur, Nizamabad.He later on lived in Chikkadpally, Hyderabad. He was a graduate in science, arts and law from Osmania University. He married Geetha who is a law graduate and had three daughters Namratha, Niveditha and Lasya Nanditha. After his death, his daughter Lasya Nanditha won the MLA seat but she too died in a road accident on 23 February 2024.

== Political career ==
Sayanna began his political career in Telugu Desam Party and was elected to the Assembly from Secunderabad Cantonment in 1994, 1999 and 2004, he lost the seat in 2009 to Congress candidate P Shankar Rao in undivided Andhra Pradesh. He also served as director of HUDA (Hyderabad Urban Development Authority) six times in the erstwhile Andhra Pradesh. He worked as the Chairman of the House Committee on Rehabilitation of Street Children in the erstwhile Andhra Pradesh Legislative Assembly. Sayanna also worked as a member of the House Committee on Child trafficking.

Sayanna wrested the seat in 2014 Telangana Assembly Elections on a TDP ticket and was a member of the Tirumala Tirupati Devasthanam Board (TTD) and quit membership in 2015 after joining TRS (now BRS) and retained the seat in 2018.

== Elections contested ==
Election results
Year	Election	Constituency	Party	Opponent	Majority	Result
1994	Andhra Pradesh Legislative Assembly election	Secunderabad Cantonment	TDP	D. Narsing Rao (INC)	3636	Won
1999	Andhra Pradesh Legislative Assembly election	Secunderabad Cantonment	TDP	D. B. Devender (INC)	29,941	Won
2004	Andhra Pradesh Legislative Assembly election	Secunderabad Cantonment	TDP	Ravula Anjaiah (TRS)	15,032	Won
2009	Andhra Pradesh Legislative Assembly election	Secunderabad Cantonment	TDP	P. Shankar Rao (INC)	4183	Lost
2014	Telangana Legislative Assembly election	Secunderabad Cantonment	TDP	Gajjela Nagesh (TRS)	3,275	Won
2018	Telangana Legislative Assembly election	Secunderabad Cantonment	TRS	Sarvey Sathyanarayana (INC)	37,563	Won

== Death ==
Sayanna suffered from a kidney-related ailment and undergoing treatment at Yashoda Hospital, Secunderabad. He was suffering from kidney and heart problems. He was admitted to the hospital on 18 February 2023 due to a heart attack and his condition was said to have deteriorated leading to his sudden death due to a cardiac arrest on 19 February 2023.
