= Bethi Subhas Reddy =

Indian politician

Bethi Subhas Reddy (born 1964) is an Indian politician from Telangana state. He is a former member of the Telangana Legislative Assembly in 2018 representing the Uppal Assembly constituency in Ranga Reddy district representing the Telangana Rashtra Samithi.

== Early life ==
Reddy is from Chandra Reddy village, Ramajipet, Yadadri-Bhuvanagiri district. He completed his Intermediate at Andhra Pradesh Government Junior College, S.P. Road, Secunderabad in 1982. He declared assets worth Rs.2 crore in 2014 and Rs.4 crore in 2018, in his affidavits to the Election Commission of India.

== Career ==
Reddy won the Uppal Assembly constituency in the 2018 Telangana Legislative Assembly election representing the Telangana Rashtra Samithi. He polled 1,17,442 votes and defeated his nearest rival, Tulla Veerender Goud of the Telugu Desam Party, by a margin of 48,168 votes. In April 2024, he quit Bharat Rashtra Samithi and joined the Bharatiya Janata Party.
