= Secunderabad Cantonment Assembly constituency =

Constituency of the Telangana legislative assembly in India

Coordinates: 17.46°N 78.49°E

Secunderabad Cantonment
- Constituency No. 71 for the Telangana Legislative Assembly
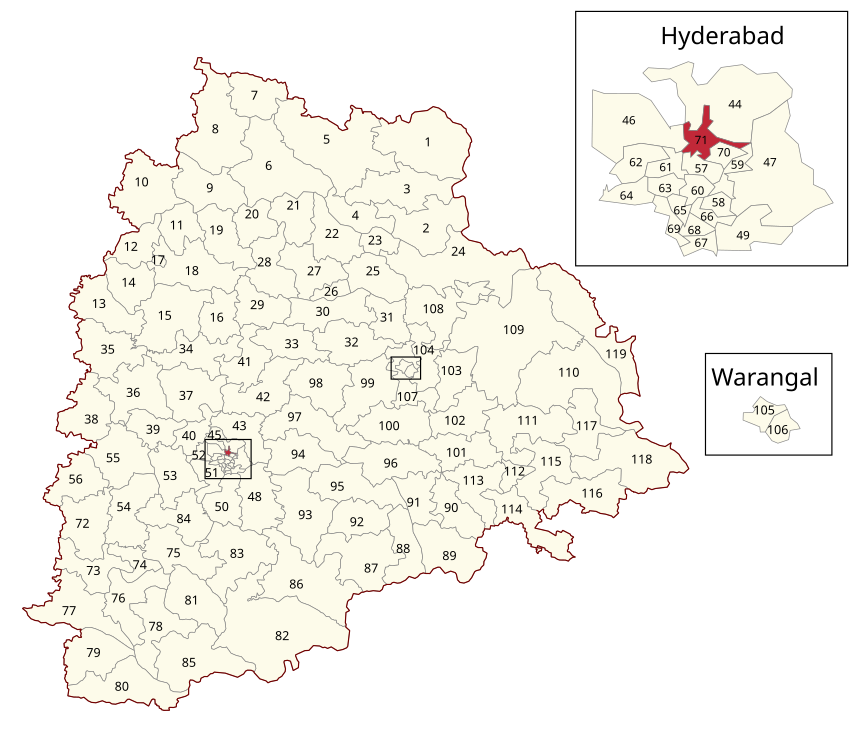
- Location of Secunderabad Cantonment Assembly constituency within Telangana

Constituency details
- Country: India
- Region: South India
- State: Telangana
- District: Hyderabad
- Lok Sabha constituency: Malkajgiri
- Established: 1957 to 1977, 2008 to present
- Total electors: 231,004
- Reservation: SC

Member of Legislative Assembly
- 3rd Telangana Legislative Assembly
- Incumbent Narayanan Sri Ganesh
- Party: Indian National Congress
- Elected year: 2024

Secunderabad Cantonment Assembly constituency is a constituency of Telangana Legislative Assembly, India. It is one of 24 constituencies in the capital city of Hyderabad. It is part of Malkajgiri Lok Sabha constituency.

In 2014, G. Sayanna from the Telugu Desam Party was elected as MLA by defeating the nearest rival by a 2.60% margin. The incumbent MLA, Shri G. Sayanna, died on 19 February 2023. In the 2023 election, G. Lasya Nandita, daughter of Sayanna, from the BRS party, won the election and became the MLA. However, she died on 23 February 2024 in a road accident on Orr Hyderabad.

== Extent of the constituency ==
The Assembly Constituency presently comprises the following neighbourhoods:

Mandalas
Marredpally
Trimulgherry
Bolarum
Sikh Village
Lothkunta
Karkhana
Begumpet (part)
Rastrapathi Road (part)

== Members of Legislative Assembly ==
Year	Member	Party
Andhra Pradesh
1978	B. Machinder Rao	Janata Party
1983	N. A. Krishna	Independent
1985	S. Satyanarayana	Telugu Desam Party
1989	D. Narsinga Rao	Indian National Congress
1994	G. Sayanna	Telugu Desam Party
1999	G. Sayanna	Telugu Desam Party
2004	G. Sayanna	Telugu Desam Party
2009	P. Shankar Rao	Indian National Congress
Telangana
2014	G. Sayanna	Telugu Desam Party
2018	G. Sayanna	Bharat Rashtra Samithi
2023	G. Lasya Nanditha	Bharat Rashtra Samithi
2024^	Sri Ganesh	Indian National Congress

^by-election

== Election results ==
=== 2024 by-election ===
Telangana Legislative Assembly by-election, 2024: Secunderabad Cantonment
Party	Candidate	Votes	%	±%
INC	Sri Ganesh	53,651	40.86	
BJP	T. N. Vamsha Tilak	40,445	30.80	
BRS	G Niveditha Sayanna	34,462	26.25	
NOTA	None of the Above	969	0.74	
Majority		13,206	10.06	
Turnout		1,31,788	51.93	
INC gain from BRS		Swing		

=== 2023 ===
2023 Telangana Legislative Assembly election: Secunderabad Cantonment
Party	Candidate	Votes	%	±%
BRS	G. Lasya Nanditha	59,057	47.52	▼9.18
BJP	Sri Ganesh	41,888	33.64	▲20.34
INC	G. V. Venella	20,825	16.72	▼7.58
NOTA	None of the Above	1,220	0.97	▼0.36
Majority		17,169	13.88	
Turnout		1,24,517		
BRS hold		Swing		

=== 2018 ===
2018 Telangana Legislative Assembly election: Secunderabad Cantonment
Party	Candidate	Votes	%	±%
TRS	G. Sayanna	65,797	56.7	+21.2
INC	Sarvey Sathyanarayana	28,234	24.3	+11.7
BJP	Sri Ganesh	15,487	13.30	new
NOTA	None of the Above	1,571	1.33	
Majority		37,563	32.3	+29.7
Turnout		1,16,144	46.7%	−4.0
TRS gain from TDP		Swing		

=== 2014 ===
2014 Telangana Legislative Assembly election: Secunderabad Cantt.
Party	Candidate	Votes	%	±%
TDP	G. Sayanna	44,693	35.50	+5.87
TRS	Gajjela Nagesh	41,418	32.98	+32.98
INC	Gajjela Kantham	22,136	12.58	−20.84
Majority		3,275	2.60	
Turnout		1,25,894	50.7%	
TDP gain from INC		Swing		

== See also ==
- Secunderabad Assembly constituency
- List of constituencies of Telangana Legislative Assembly
