= G. Lasya Nanditha =

Indian politician (1986/1987–2024)

Member of Telangana Legislative Assembly
- In office 3 December 2023 – 23 February 2024
- Preceded by: G. Sayanna
- Succeeded by: Sri Ganesh
- Constituency: Secunderabad Cantt. (SC)

Personal details
- Born: 1986/1987
- Died: 23 February 2024 (aged 37) Hyderabad, Telangana, India
- Party: Bharat Rashtra Samithi

G. Lasya Nanditha (1986/1987 – 23 February 2024) was an Indian politician from Secunderabad, Telangana state. She was a former corporator from Kavadiguda (2016) and an MLA from Secunderabad Cantonment.

== Early life and education ==
Nanditha was born to G. Sayanna and G. Geetha. She had two sisters, Namratha and Niveditha. She completed intermediate, the plus two course in Secunderabad.

== Career ==
Nanditha contested the 2023 Telangana Legislative Assembly election as a candidate of the Bharat Rashtra Samithi from the Secunderabad Cantonment constituency, a reserved constituency for Scheduled Caste community members, and won the seat defeating Sri Ganesh of the BJP by 17,169 votes. She polled 59,057 votes defeating her nearest BJP rival N Sri Ganesh with a margin of 17,169 votes. Ganesh polled 41,888 votes, Congress nominee G.V. Vennala finished third in the contest with 20,825 votes. Her father, G. Sayanna, was the sitting MLA from Secunderabad Cantonment but he died in February 2023.

== Death ==
Nanditha died in a road collision in Hyderabad, on 23 February 2024, at the age of 37. She had suffered serious injuries after her vehicle lost control and collided with the road divider. Nanditha was travelling along with her driver Akash who was driving at the time of accident. She was rushed to a private hospital immediately after the accident but was pronounced dead on arrival at the hospital.
