= Lingojiguda =

- Neighbourhood
- Location in Telangana, India Lingojiguda (Telangana) Lingojiguda (India)
- Coordinates: 17°16′N 78°56′E
- Country: India
- State: Telangana
- District: Ranga Reddy
- Metro: Hyderabad

Government
  - Body: GHMC

Languages
  - Official: Telugu
- Time zone: UTC+5:30 (IST)
- Vehicle registration: TS
- Lok Sabha constituency: Hyderabad
- Vidhan Sabha constituency: L.B. Nagar
- Planning agency: GHMC
- Website: telangana.gov.in

Lingojiguda is a residential neighbourhood of Hyderabad in Ranga Reddy district, Telangana, India.
