= Bandari Lakshma Reddy =

Indian politician

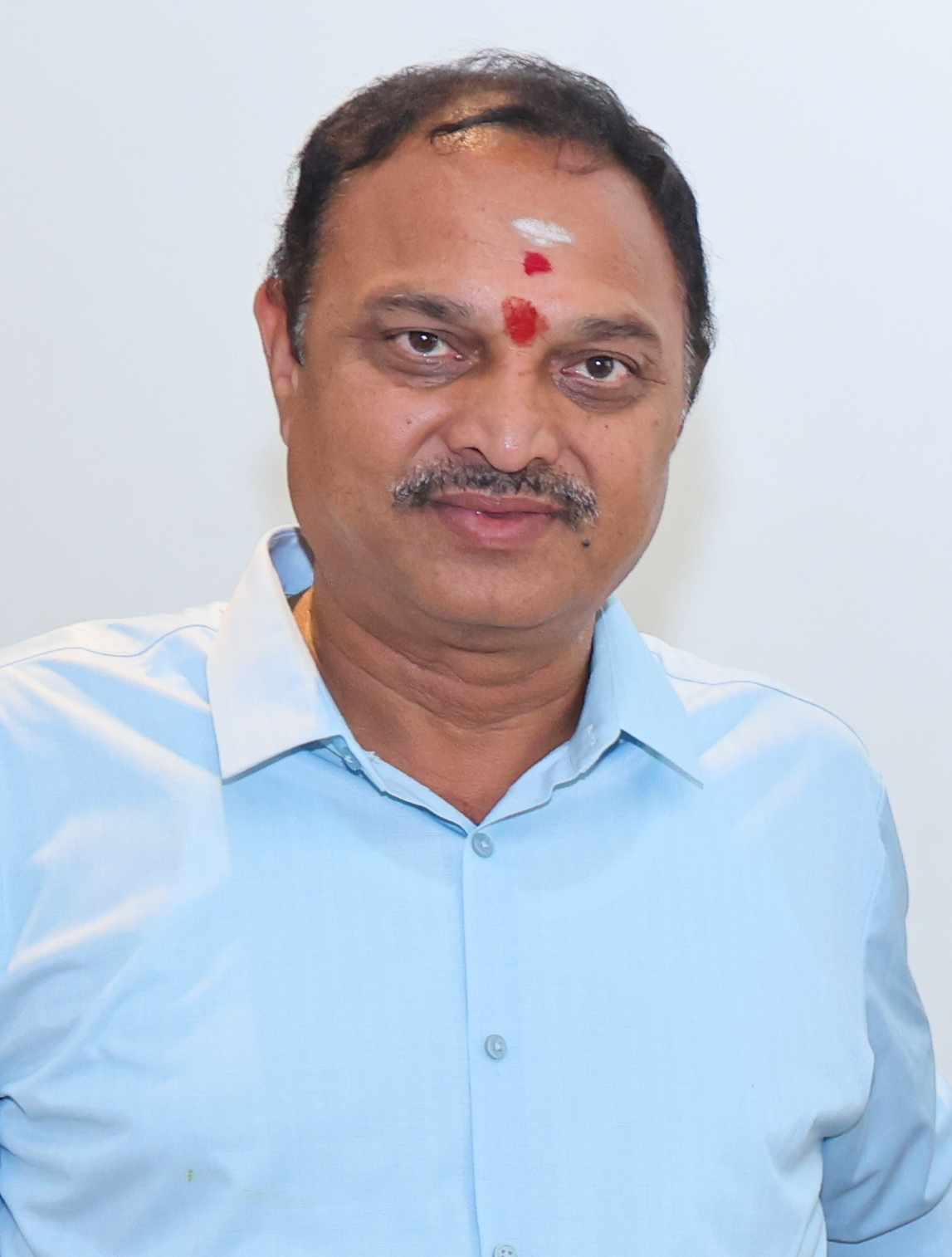

Member of Legislative Assembly, Telangana
- Incumbent
- Assumed office 2023
- Preceded by: Bethi Subhas Reddy
- Constituency: Uppal

Personal details
- Relatives: Bandari Raji Reddy (brother)

Bandari Lakshma Reddy (born 1967) is an Indian politician from Telangana state. He is an MLA from Uppal Assembly constituency in Medchal Malkajgiri district. He represents Bharat Rashtra Samithi and won the 2023 Telangana Legislative Assembly election.

== Early life and education ==
Reddy is from Uppal, Medchal Malkajgiri district. His late father Bandari Janga Reddy was a farmer. He passed Class 8 in 1982 from DAE School, ECIL, Hyderabad and discontinued his studies from Class 9.

== Career ==
Reddy won from Uppal Assembly constituency representing Bharat Rashtra Samithi in the 2023 Telangana Legislative Assembly election. He polled 132,927 votes and defeated his nearest rival, Mandumula Parameshwar Reddy of Indian National Congress by a huge margin of 49,030 votes.
