= Pratap Singaram =

Coordinates: 17°23′11″N 78°39′43″E

Pratap Singaram Pratapa Shinghavaram
- Village
- Interactive map of Pratap Singaram
- Country: India
- State: Telangana
- Established: 1363 A.D.
- Founder: Rami Reddy
- Named for: Kakatiya king Pratapa Rudra

Government
  - Type: Panchayat

Area
  - Total: 6 km^{2} (2.3 sq mi)
- Elevation: 460 m (1,510 ft)

Population (2021)
  - Total: 2,024
  - Density: 340/km^{2} (870/sq mi)

Languages
  - Official: Telugu
- Time zone: UTC+5:30 (IST)
- Postal code: 500088
- Telephone code: 040
- Vehicle registration: TS 08 X XXXX

Pratap Singaram is a village in Medchal-Malkajgiri district in Telangana, India. It falls under Ghatkesar mandal. Established in the year 1363 by a person named Rami Reddy, it was originally named as Pratapa Shinghavaram after Kakatiya king Pratapa Rudra.

Pratap Singaram village has the River Musi on its south and east, covering a total shore length of 4.5km. To the north it is bordered by Korremul and Sadat Ali Gudem villages, and on the west it is bordered by Muthvelliguda and Kachavani Singaram villages.

Pratap Singaram is located 9km from Uppal Junction, and 2km from ORR Gowrelli/Taramatipet Exit number 10.
