= N. V. S. S. Prabhakar =

Indian politician

Dr. N. V. S. S. Prabhakar
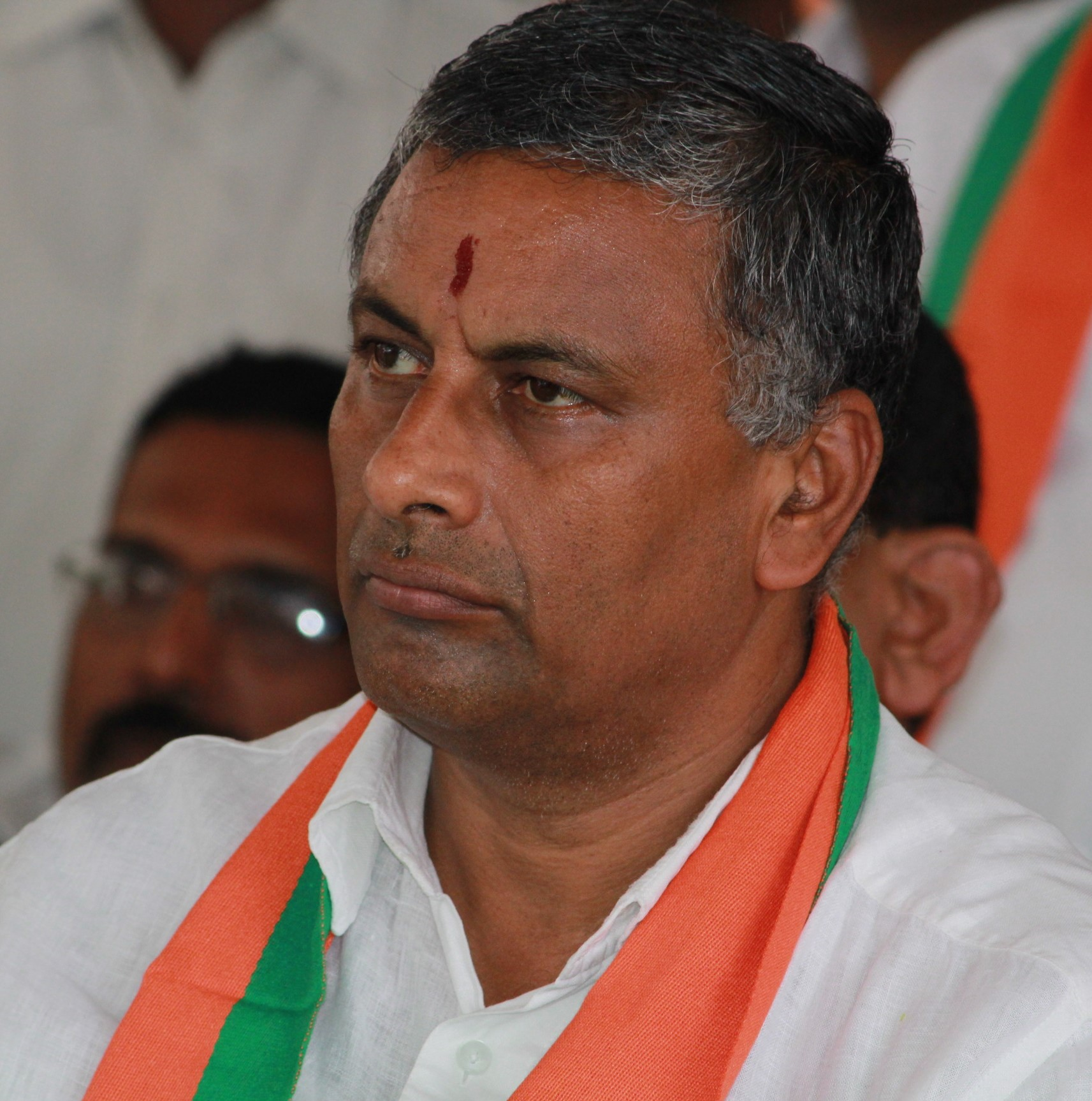

Member of the Telangana Legislative Assembly
- In office 2014 - 2018
- Constituency: Uppal

Personal details
- Born: 23 March 1966 (age 60) Telangana
- Party: Bharatiya Janata Party
- Occupation: Politician

Dr. N. V. S. S. Prabhakar is a politician in Telangana and he was Uppal MLA from 2014 to 2018 Uppal Assembly constituency and also Telangana Legislative Assembly. He is Vice president of BJP Telangana State.

== Early life ==
Prabhakar gained a degree in Civil Engineering from JNTU Hyderabad.

== Political career ==
N. V. S. S. Prabhakar contested as a BJP candidate in the Andhra Pradesh assembly elections in 2009 and was defeated.

After the formation of a separate state of Telangana, he contested the Telangana assembly election in 2014 as a BJP candidate from Uppal constituency and was elected as an MLA for the first time by winning with a majority of 14169 votes over his nearest rival TRS candidate Bheti Subhash Reddy.

N. V. S. S. Prabhakar contested the 2018 Telangana Assembly election as a BJP candidate from Uppal constituency and lost to TRS candidate Bheti Subhash Reddy by a margin of 48168 votes, lost deposit.

After contesting the 2023 elections and losing, he was appointed by the BJP party as the in-charge of the Bhuvanagiri Lok Sabha constituency in the context of the Lok Sabha elections on January 8, 2024.
