= Sri Ganesh (politician) =

Indian politician

Narayanan Sri Ganesh

Member of Telangana Legislative Assembly
- In office 4 June 2024
- Preceded by: G. Lasya Nanditha
- Constituency: Secunderabad Cantonment

Personal details
- Born: 8 August 1978 (age 48) Hyderabad, Telangana, India
- Party: Indian National Congress
- Other political affiliations: BJP, BRS
- Spouse: Varsha
- Children: Mukul
- Parent: M. Narayanan

Narayanan Sri Ganesh is an Indian politician from the state of Telangana. He was elected to the Telangana Legislative Assembly from Secunderabad Cantonment in 2024 by election as a member of the Indian National Congress.

== Political career ==
Sri Ganesh started his political career with Indian National Congress and later Joined in Bharatiya Janata Party before 2018 Telangana Legislative Assembly Election and unsuccessfully contested on BJP ticket and lost to TRS candidate G. Sayanna by a margin of 37,563 votes and later joined TRS. He switched to Bharatiya Janata Party before 2023 Telangana Legislative Assembly Election and contested as BJP candidate and lost to BRS candidate G. Lasya Nanditha by 17,169 votes.

The bypoll to the Secunderabad Cantonment Assembly constituency was held on 13 May 2024, necessitated due to the death of BRS MLA G. Lasya Nanditha in a road accident on 23 February 2024. Sri Ganesh switched from BJP to Congress on 19 March 2024 and secured the congress ticket and contested as INC candidate by defeating his nearest rival Dr.T.N. Vamsha Tilak of BJP with a margin of 13,206 votes. Sri Ganesh polled 53,651 votes, while Tilak secured 40,445 votes and Nivedita Sayanna of BRS finished third with 34,462 votes. Sri Ganesh is the only MLA in Telangana state assembly Belonging Tamil community.
