= Mallepally Laxmaiah =

Indian journalist

- Born: 1961 (age 64–65); Janagama, Telangana, India
- Occupations: Journalist, Political analyst, Special Officer, Buddhavanam Project
- Notable credit: Lead the SCSP TSP Act Movement in United Andhra Pradesh State

Mallepally Laxmaiah is Indian Telugu language journalist. He worked with Vaartha and Andhra Jyothi newspaper before quitting in 2009 to participate in Telangana movement and also was one of the creators of HMTV television Telugu news channel.

== Career ==
Mallepally Laxmaiah worked with major newspapers. He has been an adviser to the Telangana Rashtra Samithi since its inception. He is also the Co-Chairman of the Joint Action Committee on Telangana which is spearheading the non-political movement. He is The Chairperson for Center for Dalit Studies. Mallepally Laxmaiah, who took an active part in the separate Telangana movement, was appointed as special officer for Buddhavanam Project at Nagarjuna Sagar in Nalgonda district in 2016 by then Chief Minister of Telangana K. Chandrashekar Rao.

== Books ==
- Laxmaiah, Mallepally (2017). Kotha Konam. ISBN 978-9386327048.

== Awards ==
1. Special award at the International Buddhist Conclave 2025, Nagpur
2. Rahmate Alam Peace Award 2022 All India Bazm-e-Rahmate Alam committee presented the Rahmate Alam Peace Award 2022 to senior journalist Mallepally Laxmaiah
3. The Bodhivardhana award 2017 Mallepalli Laxmaiah was chosen for the award due to his Dalit activism and association with Buddhism.
