= Devireddy Sudheer Reddy =

Indian politician

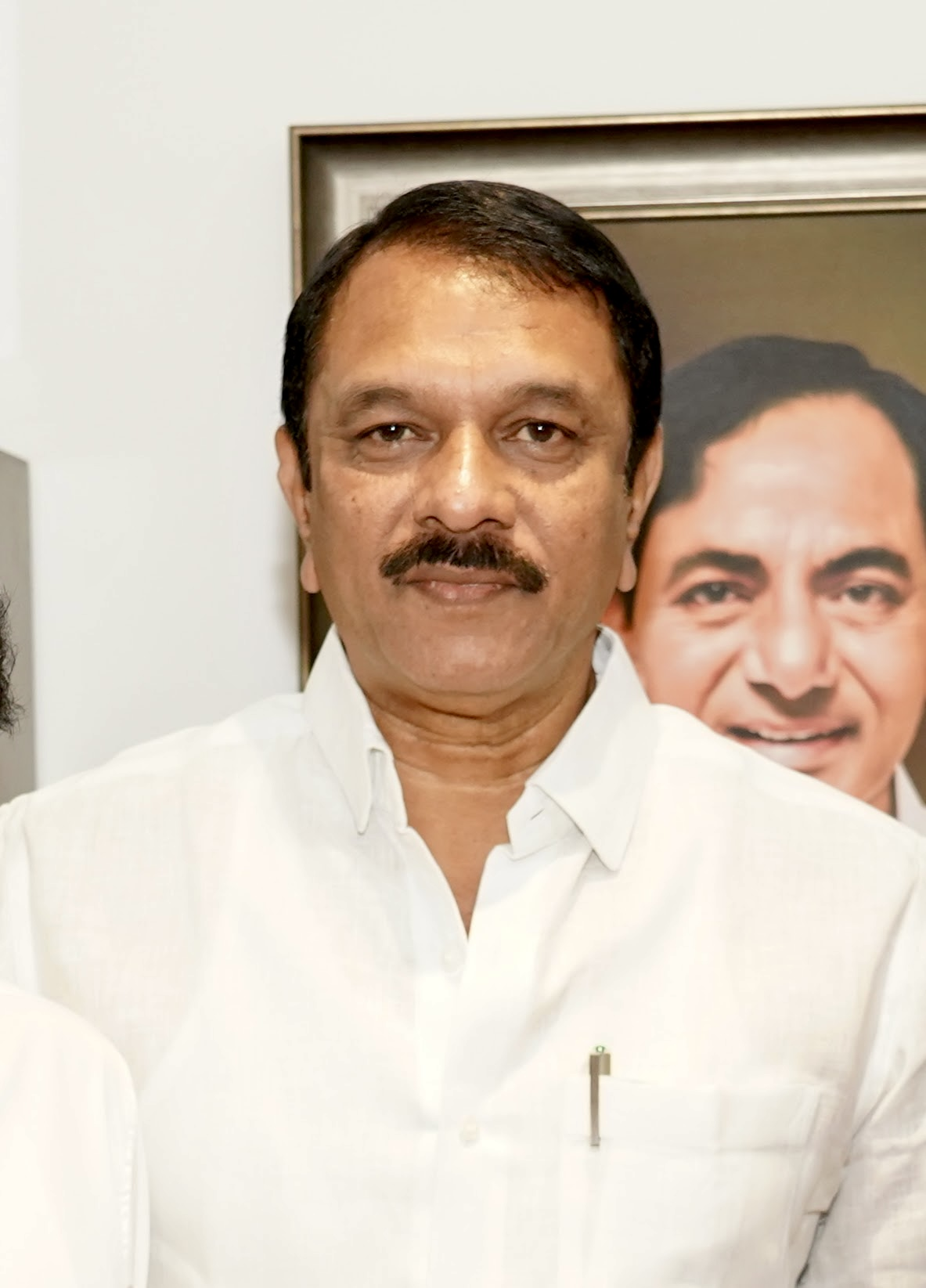

Member of the Telangana Legislative Assembly
- Incumbent
- Assumed office 2018
- Preceded by: R. Krishnaiah
- Constituency: L. B. Nagar

Member of Legislative Assembly Andhra Pradesh
- In office 2009-2014
- Preceded by: Constituency Established
- Succeeded by: Telangana Assembly Created
- Constituency: L. B. Nagar

The Chairman, Hyderabad Urban Development Authority
- In office 2004-2008

Personal details
- Born: 27 July 1962 (age 64)
- Party: Bharat Rashtra Samiti (2019-present)
- Other political affiliations: Indian National Congress (2009-2019)
- Spouse: Kamala Sudheer Reddy
- Children: 2
- Education: Osmania University
- Website: http://dsudheerreddy.com/

Devireddy Sudheer Reddy (born 27 July 1962) is an Indian politician from Telangana. He is a three time Member of Legislative Assembly from Lal Bahadur Nagar Assembly constituency.

== Early life and education ==
Reddy is from Lal Bahadur Nagar in Hyderabad. He married Kamala and they have two children.

== Career ==
Reddy started his political career by becoming the youngest elected member of Municipal Corporation of Hyderabad from Malakpet constituency in 1986.

He then became the first MLA from Lal Bahadur Nagar Assembly Constituency after the delimitation in 2009. He won the election by polling a total of 67510 votes.

He was elected for the second time winning the 2018 Telangana Legislative Assembly election from Lal Bahadur Nagar Assembly constituency. Reddy polled 113,980 votes and defeated his nearest rival Mudda Ram Mohan Goud of BRS by 17,848 votes. Goud pulled 96,132 votes. Previously, he served as the Chairman of the Hyderabad Urban Development Authority from 2004 to 2008. He was also appointed Musi River Development Front Corporation Limited Chairman by Telangana government in February, 2020 for a period of three years.

=== Works as Chairman of the HUDA ===
Reddy spearheaded the planning and implementation of the Outer Ring Road.

He spearheaded the planning, implementation, and completion of the P V Narasimha Rao expressway, which is India's longest at 11.6 kilometers.

Reddy led several agitations for shifting of the garbage dump yard from Autonagar. In 2003, he requested the then combined Andhra Pradesh Congress Legislature Party (CLP) leader, Y. S. Rajasekhara Reddy, to visit the dump yard. The entire garbage generated by the twin cities used to be dumped in a 40-acre dumping yard in the Autonagar area. Over one lakh people in the nearby 20 colonies and 10 villages were suffering from dangerous health hazards, and deaths in the region increased. Y. S. Rajasekhara Reddy raised this issue in an assembly session. Sudheer Reddy, after becoming the HUDA chairman, passed orders to shift the Autonagar dump yard from Hyderabad.

Reddy took initiatives to protect the environment and lakes by installing sewage treatment plants. He said that sewage generated from the colonies in Madhapur and Jubilee Hills had flowed into the lake for years, polluting Durgam Cheruvu.

He has taken up initiative of plantation drive in 11 mandals, covering 109 panchayats outside the municipal corporation limits of Hyderabad. As a part of this program, two lakhs plants were planted in record time.

== Padayatra ==
In 2003, Y. S. Rajasekhara Reddy began a 60-day, 1,500 km padayatra to highlight problems which were being faced by farmers due to drought. Sudheer Reddy accompanied Rajasekhara Reddy on the padayatra. Sudheer Reddy helped organise rallies and public meetings between villages with locals.

== Family ==
Sudheer Reddy was born to D. Jayachandra Reddy and D. Chandrakala. His father was a government employee in the combined state of Andhra Pradesh. He is married to Devireddy Kamala Sudheer Reddy and has two children, namely Preetham and Goutham.
