= Devender Goud =

Indian politician

Tulla Devender Goud
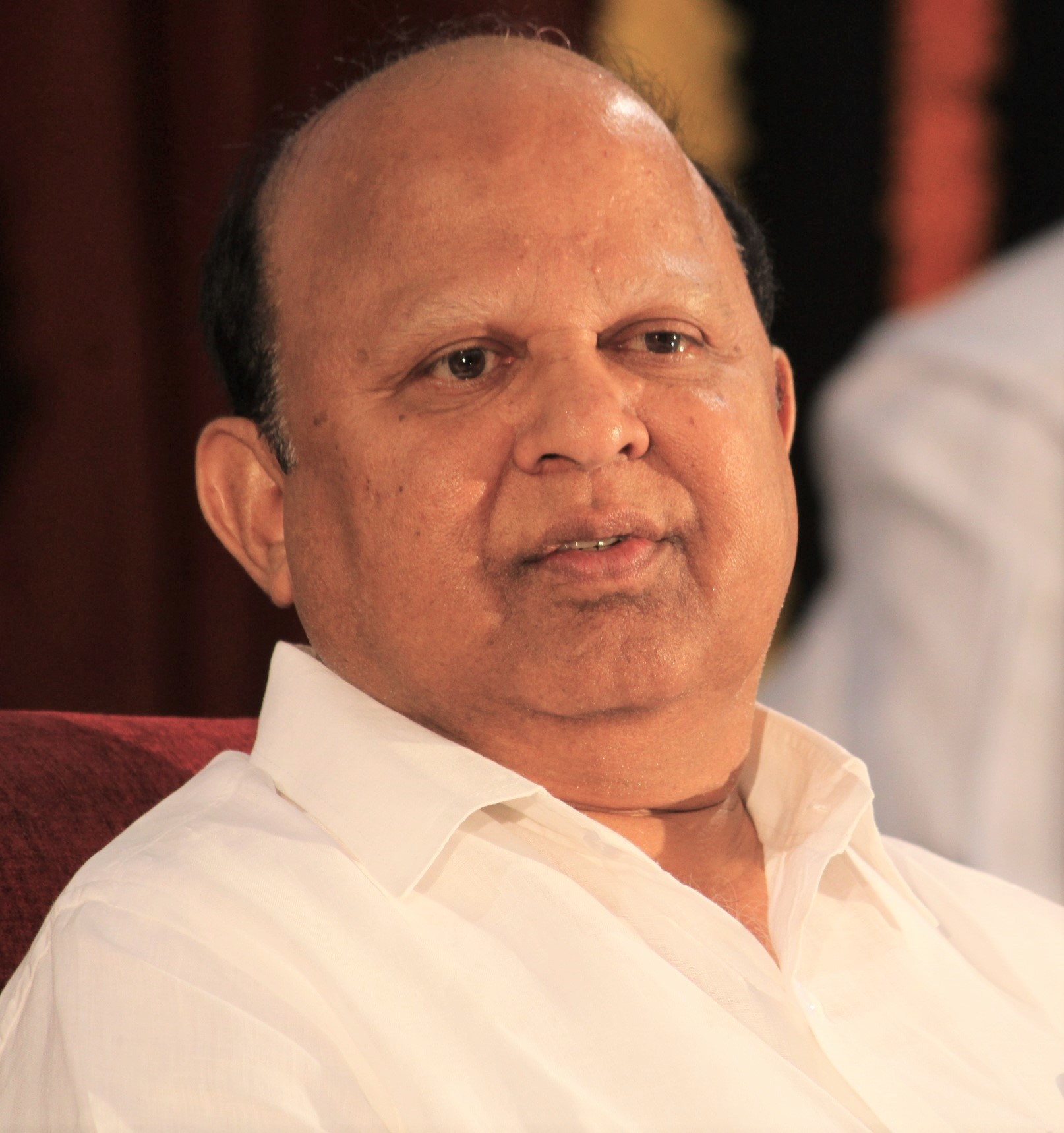
- Goud in 2015

Member of Parliament, Rajya Sabha
- In office 3 April 2012 – 2 April 2018
- Preceded by: K. Keshava Rao
- Succeeded by: C. M. Ramesh
- Constituency: Andhra Pradesh

Minister for Home affairs and Cinematography Government of Andhra Pradesh
- In office 1999–2004
- Governor: C. Rangarajan; Surjit Singh Barnala
- Chief Minister: N. Chandrababu Naidu
- Preceded by: Alimineti Madhava Reddy
- Succeeded by: Kunduru Jana Reddy (Home Affairs); M. Satyanarayana Rao (Cinematography)

Minister of BC Welfare, Prohibition and Excise, Cooperation, Revenue and Rehabilitation Government of Andhra Pradesh
- In office 1994–1999
- Governor: Krishan Kant; C. Rangarajan
- Chief Minister: N. T. Rama Rao; N. Chandrababu Naidu
- Preceded by: N. Chandrababu Naidu (Revenue and Rehabilitation)
- Succeeded by: Tammineni Sitaram (Revenue and Rehabilitation)

Member of Legislative Assembly, Andhra Pradesh
- In office 1994–2008
- Preceded by: Singireddy Uma Venkatarama Reddy
- Succeeded by: Kichannagari Laxma Reddy
- Constituency: Medchal

Personal details
- Born: 18 March 1953 (age 73) Tukkuguda, Hyderabad State (present–day Telangana), India
- Party: Telugu Desam Party (1988–2008; since 2009)
- Other political affiliations: Praja Rajyam Party (2009); Nava Telangana Praja Party (2008–2009)
- Spouse: T. Vinoda
- Children: 3

Tulla Devender Goud is an Indian politician from the Telugu Desam Party. He founded the Nava Telangana Praja Party (NTP) to fight for separate statehood for the Telangana region in Andhra Pradesh, but later returned to his parent outfit.

A backward classes leader, he served as a cabinet minister for BC welfare and Prohibition portfolios in N.T. Rama Rao's cabinet. He has also worked as a cabinet minister handling Revenue and Home portfolios under Nara Chandrababu Naidu.

He was elected three times to the Legislative Assembly of Andhra Pradesh from the Medchal assembly constituency as a representative of the Telugu Desam Party (TDP). He was a TDP politbureau member since 1991, deputy leader of TDP legislature party in the AP legislative assembly and was considered number two leader, next only to Nara Chandrababu Naidu in TDP before he resigned to fight for separate statehood of the Telangana state.

== Electoral history ==
Year	Constituency	Party	Votes	%	Opponent	Party	Votes	%	Result	Margin	%
1994	Medchal	TDP	1,18,743	52.88	Singireddy Uma Devi	INC	67,269	29.96	Won	+51,474	+22.92
1999	Medchal	TDP	1,93,731	60.10	Singireddy Harivardhan Reddy	INC	1,15,848	35.94	Won	+77,883	+24.16
2004	Medchal	TDP	1,72,916	50.39	Komma Reddy Surender Reddy	TRS	1,58,209	46.11	Won	+14,707	+4.28
2009	Ibrahimpatnam	PRP	35,179	22.75	Malreddy Ranga Reddy	INC	47,292	30.58	Lost	-12,113	-7.83
2009	Malkajgiri (MP)	PRP	2,38,886	19.81	Sarvey Sathyanarayana	INC	3,88,368	32.21	Lost	-1,49,482	-12.40

== Personal details ==
Tulla Devender Goud was born on 18 March 1953 at Thukkuguda village of the Maheswaram mandal, in the Rangareddy district of Telangana, to Tulla Sayanna Goud and Sathemma. He earned his bachelor's degree in commerce from Badruka college at Hyderabad, Telangana.

He married Vinoda in 1978, and together they had three sons Vijayender, Vinayender, and Veerender Goud.

== Political career ==
Goud was elected as a student leader while at college. He then joined N.T. Rama Rao's new political party, the Telugu Desam Party (TDP) and was elected Chairman of the Zilla Parishad for the Rangareddy district. He became the TDP candidate for Medchal assembly constituency six months prior to the scheduled elections of 1994 Andhra Pradesh Legislative Assembly, and was elected as a Member of the Legislative Assembly (MLA) for that constituency in 1994.

Goud became a member of Rao's cabinet with responsibility for three independent portfolios: Backward Classes welfare, Co-operation, and Total Prohibition. He became Revenue Minister in Nara Chandrababu Naidu's cabinet after the latter rebelled against Rao in 1995.

He was re-elected as MLA for Medchal in 1999 with a margin of over 77,000 votes. Subsequently, he became minister for Home, Jails, Fire services, NCC, Sainik Welfare, Film Development Corporation and Cinematography in Naidu's cabinet.

In 2004 he won a record-third term from the Medchal constituency, despite a statewide wave of anti-incumbency against the TDP government, as well as in favour of a separate Telangana state. The TDP lost those elections to the Indian National Congress (INC), and Goud was appointed as TDP deputy leader in the legislative assembly.

Subsequently, there were problems perceived in the Telangana regions by the diversion of water from the Krishna and Godavari rivers to other areas, and by the manner in which the INC sidelined its election promise to separate Telangana as an independent state. Furthermore, there were sales of public lands in the Telangana region and there was a lack of representation for the people of the region people in the local job market, including in administrative and bureaucratic posts. Goud believed that Telangana leaders should fight against these perceived injustices and organized a padayatra (procession on foot) from Pranahitha to Chevella in protest. This was well received in Telangana and forced the TDP to support the idea of separate Telangana statehood in the May 2008 by-elections.

Following the by-elections the TDP retreated from its promise of separate statehood and instead constituted a committee to decide the issue. Goud now thought that both the INC and TDP were procrastinating and were not particularly in favour of the idea, so he resigned from his legislative assembly seat and from the TDP in June 2008 in protest.

He then organized a Telangana Sadhana Samithi discussion with scholars and professors from the Telangana regions to discuss future action. This meeting was attended by 3000 delegates including Praja Gayakudu Gaddar, Konda Laxman Bapuji, Mallepalli Laxmaiah and ThirumaLi.

On 9 July 2008 he organized a convention of Telangana students at Osmania University to explain his resignation from the TDP and his plans to lead non-violent agitation for statehood. He stressed the importance of participation of students in fighting for the statehood of Telangana without violence as happened between 1967 and 1971.

On 11 July 2008 Goud announced a new political party, the Nava Telangana Praja Party, to fight for Telangana statehood. However, it was soon decided to merge this with the Praja Rajyam Party. While the official reason for the merger is said to be common ideology of the two parties—social justice and separate Telangana, the reality is that Goud has been finding it difficult to run the party as it had failed to create the kind of impact he expected before he quit TDP on 23 June 2008 therefore watching out for his political future the decision was made about the merger.

Goud lost both the parliamentary and assembly elections in 2009. Then, on 3 August 2009, Goud resigned from the Praja Rajyam Party and announced that he would rejoin the TDP. In 2012, he was elected to the Rajya Sabha as a TDP candidate.

== Positions held ==
1. Chairman - Ranga Reddy District Zilla Parishad 1988-93
2. Medchal MLA 1994- 99, 1999-2003 and 2003 – 2008
3. Minister for Backward Classes Welfare, Prohibition and Excise, Cooperation 1994 - 1995
4. Minister for Revenue and Rehabilitation, 1995 - 1999
5. Minister for Home and Cinematography, 1999 – 2004
6. Deputy Leader, Telugu Desam Legislature Party, Andhra Pradesh Legislative Assembly Pradesh 2004 – 2008
7. Member of Parliament - Rajya Sabha April 2012 - May 2018

1. May 2012 – May 2014 Member, Committee on Defence Member, Committee on Welfare of Other Backward Classes
2. May 2012 – May 2014 and March 2015 onwards Member, Consultative Committee for the Ministry of Home Affairs
3. May 2012 onwards Member, General Purposes Committee Aug. 2012
4. May 2014 Member, Parliamentary Forum on Water Conservation and Management July 2013
5. Nominated to the Panel of vice-chairmen, Rajya Sabha Sept. 2014
6. Nominated to the Panel of vice-chairmen, Rajya Sabha Sept. 2014
7. Sept. 2014 onwards Member, Committee on Rules
8. Oct. 2014 onwards Member, Committee on Ethics
9. March 2015 Member, Select Committee of Rajya Sabha on the Coal Mines (Special Provisions) Bill
10. 2015 Dec to 2015-Aug 2016 Member, Select Committee on the Prevention of Corruption (Amendment) Bill
11. 2013 Sept - 2016 Member, Committee on Rural Development
12. March 2017 onwards Member, General Purposes Committee

== External References ==
- TDP leader resigns over Telangana
- Goud's NTP to merge with PRP
- Goud quits PRP, to join TDP
