= P. Shankar Rao =

Indian politician

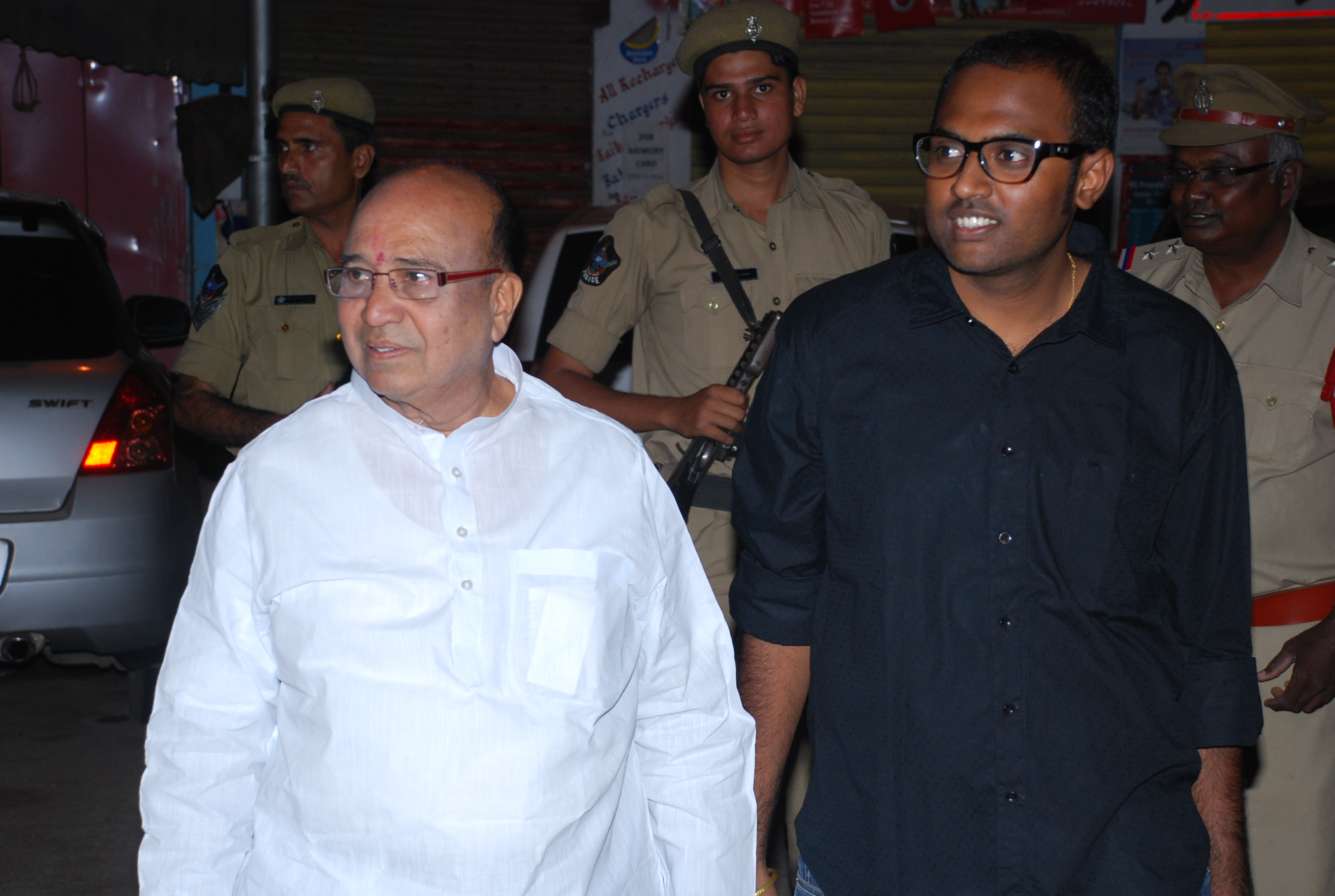

Former MLA and Cabinet Minister
- Constituency: Secunderabad-Cantonment (MLA-2009-14);Shadnagar (MLA-1983-1989-1999-2004), Ex-Minister, Ex Dy. CLP Leader

Personal details
- Born: Hyderabad, India
- Party: Indian National Congress
- Spouse: Vishwashanti
- Relations: Gaddam Venkatswamy Gaddam Vivek Venkatswamy Gaddam Vinod
- Children: P Shashank, P Sushmita, P Sanjay
- Profession: Politician

Dr. P. Shankar Rao is an Indian veteran politician from the state of Telangana. He is a member of Indian National Congress Party and has been elected representative on five occasions, as a Member of a Legislative Assembly in Andhra Pradesh.

== Early and personal life ==
Shankar Rao is the eldest son to P Rajaiah and Raja Narsamma. He has two younger brothers Penta Dayanand, Penta Jagannath and three sisters M Shakuntala, K Saraswathi, and G Jyothi. P Shankar Rao married G. Vishwashanti eldest daughter of Gaddam Venkatswamy (popularly known as Kaka) a member of the Indian National Congress (INC) political party who was elected 7 times (4 times from Peddapalli Lok Sabha and 3 times from Siddipet Lok Sabha). He has two Sons P Shashank and P Sanjay, and one Daughter P Sushmita.

== Career ==
Rao was first elected in 1983, as an MLA for the Shadnagar constituency. He was subsequently re-elected for that constituency on three (1989, 1999, 2004) more occasions. He served as Irrigation Minister in Kotla Vijaya Bhaskara Reddy's cabinet. Along with Y. S. Rajasekhara Reddy, the then CLP leader, he played a key role as Deputy CLP Leader when the party was in the opposition.

He was elected from Secunderabad Cantonment Constituency in 2009, this being his first appointment from that constituency but his fifth term as MLA, overall. He did not contest the 2014 elections.

He held different posts in the party and government in his political career of more than four decades. He was a minister for Government of Andhra Pradesh (before bifurcation) for the second time in Kiran Kumar Reddy cabinet. His portfolios were Public Enterprises, Handlooms & Textiles, Small Scale Industries, Khadi and Village Industries & Spinning Mills.. He has served as Cabinet Minister two times in his career.

He has been a staunch supporter of Telangana statehood.

== Controversies ==
Shankar Rao had filed a case in the High Court (HC) against Jagan Mohan Reddy (Former Chief Minister of Andhra Pradesh), for being in possession of illegal and disproportionate assets. The HC had issued show cause notices to all the concerned parties based on reports submitted by Shanker Rao and several others.

Shankar Rao is also involved in a protracted land grab case of Greenfields in Kanojiguda, Hyderabad and a case was booked against him after a complaint filed by the Green Fields Plot Owners Association. The case is ongoing in the high court of Telangana.
