= Karmanghat =

Karmanghat Karo Man Ghat
- Neighbourhood
- Interactive map of Karmanghat
- Coordinates: 17°20′28″N 78°31′54″E
- Country: India
- State: Telangana
- District: Ranga Reddy
- Established: 1143 AD
- Founded by: Pratapa Rudradeva II

Government
  - Body: GHMC

Population (2011)
  - Total: 31,143

Languages
  - Official: Telugu
- Time zone: UTC+5:30 (IST)
- PIN: 500 079
- Vehicle registration: TG07
- Lok Sabha constituency: Malkajgiri
- Vidhan Sabha constituency: LB Nagar
- Planning agency: GHMC

Karmanghat is a residential and commercial suburb in Hyderabad, Telangana, India.It is famous for Rice mills during 1990s, due to rapid development rice mills were shifted outside ORR and they were turned into commercial establishments. It formed Ward No. 12 of Greater Hyderabad Municipal Corporation in 2009.
