= Dilsukhnagar =

- Neighbourhood
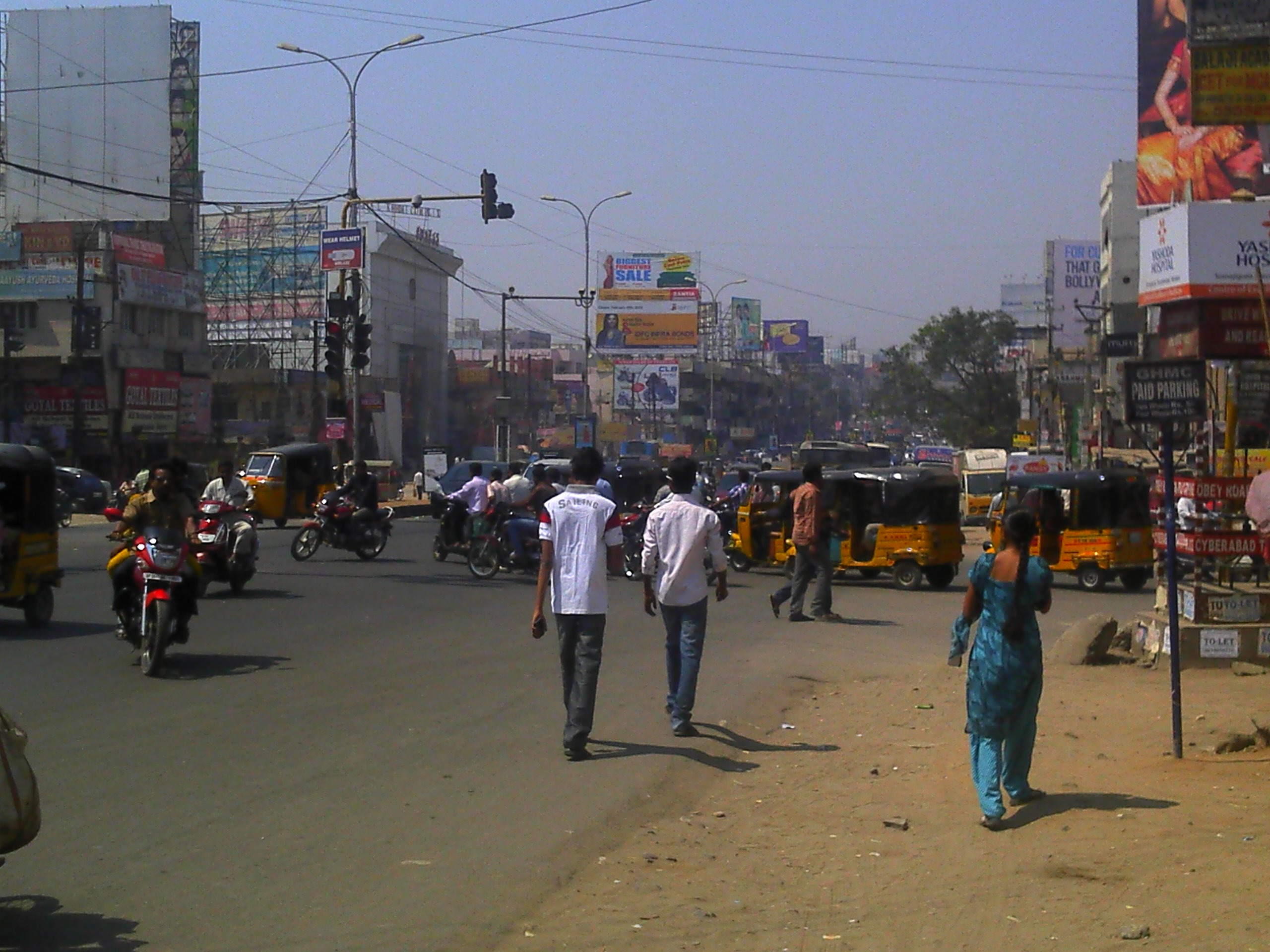
- The Busy Main Road of Dilshukhnagar

- Location in Telangana, India Dilsukhnagar (Telangana) Dilsukhnagar (India)
- Coordinates: 17.368784°N 78.524652°E
- Country: India
- State: Telangana
- District: Rangareddy
- City: Hyderabad
- Named after: Dilsukh Ramprasad

Government
  - Body: GHMC

Languages
  - Official: Telugu
- Time zone: UTC+5:30 (IST)
- PIN: 500,060
- Vehicle registration: TS 08
- Lok Sabha constituency: Hyderabad
- Vidhan Sabha constituency: L.B. Nagar
- Planning agency: GHMC

Dilsukhnagar is a commercial and residential neighborhood in Hyderabad, Telangana. One of the largest areas of the city, it is governed by the Greater Hyderabad Municipal Corporation.

== Toponym ==
Dilsukhnagar is named after Dilsukh Ram Pershad, a landlord who owned the land of the neighborhood.

== History ==
What is today Dilsukhnagar was once agricultural land owned by local landlord Dilsukh Ram Pershad. The land was converted into a non-agricultural layout and subdivided into residential plots for sale.

Once exclusively a residential suburb, strong economic growth has transformed Dilsukhnagar into a major commercial hub. Kothapet Fruit Market, one of the largest of its kind in the world, was moved to Dilsukhnagar from Jambagh in 1980.

== Administration ==
Dilsukhnagar was merged into the Greater Hyderabad Municipal Corporation in 2007 after an order passed by the Government of Telangana. It is now a part of the Telangana State Assembly.

== Transport ==
The suburb houses a Telangana State Road Transport Corporation bus depot.

Multi-Modal Transport System station in Malakpet serves Dilsukhnagar. It is well connected by Hyderabad Metro

== Incidents ==
The locality has been subject to terrorist attacks twice in its history. Both cases involved attacks using a time bomb. The first incident happened in 2002, allegedly planted by SIMI, an investigation of which is underway. The second incident involving twin blasts occurred in 2013, killing 13 people while injuring 83 others. Death toll enhanced to 17 in the ensuing days. Members of Indian Mujahideen, a terrorist group, were eventually convicted for their role in the blasts.
