= Praja Rajyam Party =

Defunct Indian political party

- Abbreviation: PRP
- President: Chiranjeevi
- Founder: Chiranjeevi
- Founded: 26 August 2008 (18 years ago)
- Dissolved: 6 February 2011 (15 years ago)
- Merged into: Indian National Congress
- Headquarters: Hyderabad, Andhra Pradesh, India (present-day Telangana)
- Youth wing: Yuva Rajyam
- Labour wing: Karmika Rajyam
- Peasant's wing: Karshaka Rajyam
- Women's wing: Mahila Rajyam
- Colours: Green
- ECI status: Dissolved

Election symbol
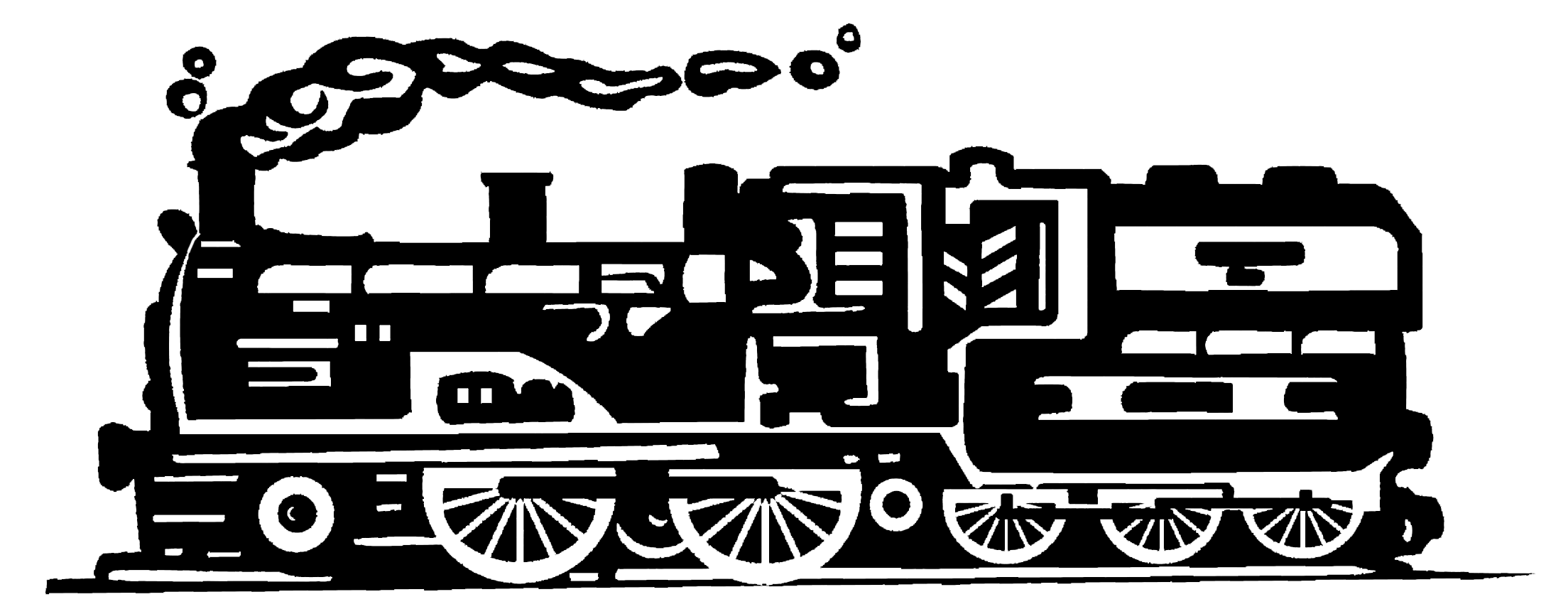
- Railway Engine (2008 – 2009) Full Sun with rays (2009 – 2011)

Party flag
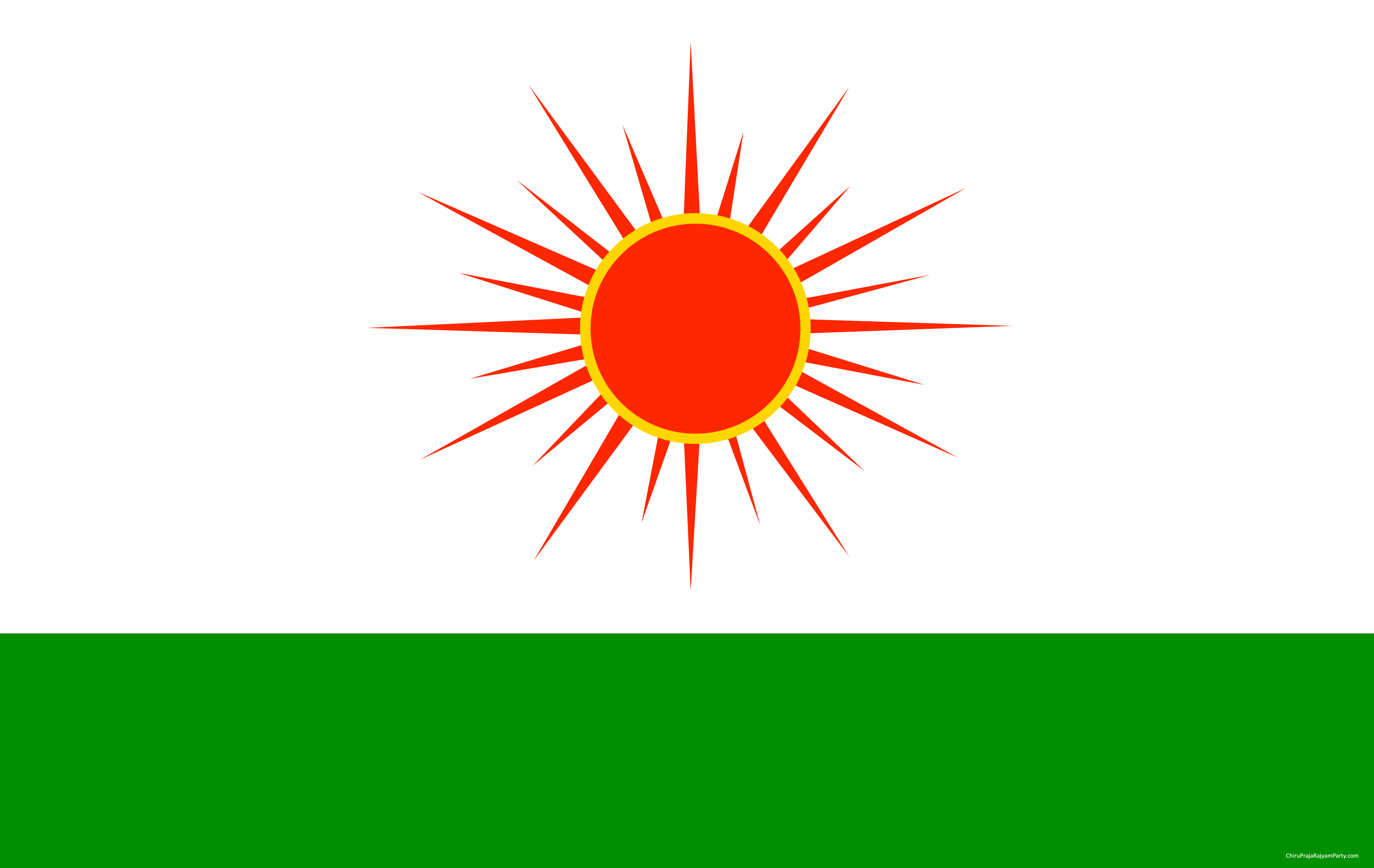

The Praja Rajyam Party (abbr. PRP; transl. People's Rule Party) was a regional political party in the Indian state of Andhra Pradesh. It was founded by Telugu film actor Chiranjeevi on 26 August 2008, with the stated aim of providing a people centric alternative to the existing political establishment. The party positioned itself on a platform of social justice, anti-corruption and inclusive development but struggled to translate popular enthusiasm into sustained electoral success. Following its poor performance in the 2009 elections, PRP gradually declined and ultimately merged with the Indian National Congress (INC) in 2011.

== History ==
=== Formation ===
Th party was founded by Chiranjeevi, was launched on 26 August 2008 at a large public meeting in Tirupati, Andhra Pradesh, where the party name which translates to "People's Rule" in Telugu was announced along with its agenda.

The party flag, unveiled at the event, consists of white occupying the top three quarters and green the bottom quarter, with a central red sun encircled by a yellow border, the colors were stated to represent clean governance and transparency (white), acknowledgment of farmers (green), change and revolution (red) and happiness in every home (yellow), while the sun emphasised energy and renewal.

In February 2009, Tulla Devender Goud, former minister and the leader of Nava Telangana Praja Party, announced the merger with the PRP. NTPP was a political faction split from the Telugu Desam Party (TDP) campaigning for Telangana state formation. Post-merger, Goud was made the vice-president of PRP. However, after the 2009 elections, in which Goud contested unsuccessfully, he resigned from PRP and re-joined the TDP in August 2009.

Chiranjeevi's meetings with Amar Singh and Sanjay Dutt of the Samajwadi Party (SP) and outreach to parties such as the Rashtriya Janata Dal led by Lalu Prasad Yadav, indicated support for efforts to form a Fourth Front as an alternative to the United Progressive Alliance, National Democratic Alliance and the existing Third Front which included both TDP and Bahujan Samaj Party, rivals of the PRP and SP. Reports also suggested PRP support for Sharad Pawar as a prime ministerial candidate.

=== Electoral debut ===
In the 2009 general elections, the party contested using a rail engine as its election symbol, winning 18 seats with 16.32% vote share in the 2009 Andhra Pradesh Legislative Assembly election, with Chiranjeevi winning in Tirupati and losing in Palakollu, one of the constituencies he contested and drawing blank in the 2009 Indian general election in Andhra Pradesh, primarily drawing support from the Kapu community in coastal Andhra regions, while performing poorly in Telangana, partly due to its stance in favour of a united Andhra Pradesh.

The party contributed significantly to the fragmentation of anti-incumbency votes, particularly in Coastal Andhra. This division weakened the TDP-led Maha Kutami alliance, which collectively won 107 seats with 34.76% vote share. TDP leader N. Chandrababu Naidu publicly attributed his party's losses in several constituencies by narrow margins to the PRP and other smaller parties such as Lok Satta, arguing that they diluted the anti-establishment vote. This fragmentation enabled the INC to retain power with 156 seats and a vote share of around 36.55%, despite facing strong anti-incumbency sentiment and a reduced seat tally compared to its 185 seats in 2004. Overall, although opposition parties together polled nearly 63.2% of the vote against the INC's 36.8%, the lack of consolidation exacerbated by PRP's regional appeal allowed the INC to form the government under Y. S. Rajasekhara Reddy.

After the election, the Election Commission of India recognised the party as a state party and allotted it the Full Sun with rays as its permanent electoral symbol, despite objections from the Dravida Munnetra Kazhagam, whose symbol was the Rising Sun. In the 2009 Greater Hyderabad Municipal Corporation election, the party won only one seat.

In 2010 Rajya Sabha elections, the party extended support to the INC candidates, directing its MLAs to vote for them. This signaled growing alignment between the parties ahead of their merger in 2011.

=== Merger with the Indian National Congress ===
On 6 February 2011, Chiranjeevi announced that his party would be merged with the INC after a meeting with its chief Sonia Gandhi. The merger was proposed by the then Minister of Defence, A. K. Antony. He stated that he had originally been compelled to create the PRP on a platform of fighting corruption and ensuring social justice but that Congress now had a good record of fighting corruption elsewhere.

It was asserted by political observers that Chiranjeevi's move may have been prompted by his loss of support in the wake of his own strong anti-Telangana stance in previous months. It was argued in the press that Chiranjeevi's move would particularly strengthen Congress's hand in retaining the Kapu vote share, as the PRP had done particularly well among them.

After the merger, Chiranjeevi resigned from his membership to the Andhra Pradesh Legislative Assembly in March 2012, following his nomination and election to the Rajya Sabha on an INC ticket.

Later that year, on 28 October 2012, he was inducted into the Union Cabinet as Minister of State (Independent Charge) for Tourism in the Second Manmohan Singh ministry, which he held until May 2014.

== Electoral performance ==
Lok Sabha elections
Year	Lok Sabha	Party leader	Seats contested	Seats won	Change in seats	(%) of votes	Vote swing	Popular vote	Outcome	Ref.
2009	15th	Chiranjeevi	40	0 / 543	new	15.67	new	6,590,046	Lost	

Andhra Pradesh Legislative Assembly elections
Year	Lok Sabha	Party leader	Seats contested	Seats won	Change in seats	(%) of votes	Vote swing	Popular vote	Outcome	Ref.
2009	13th	Chiranjeevi	288	18 / 294	new	16.32	new	6,863,509	Others	

== See also ==
- Politics of India
- Elections in India
- Politics of Andhra Pradesh
- Elections in Andhra Pradesh
- List of political parties in India
