= Narsampet Assembly constituency =

Constituency of the Telangana legislative assembly in India

Coordinates: 17.93°N 79.89°E

Narsampet
- Constituency No. 103 for the Telangana Legislative Assembly
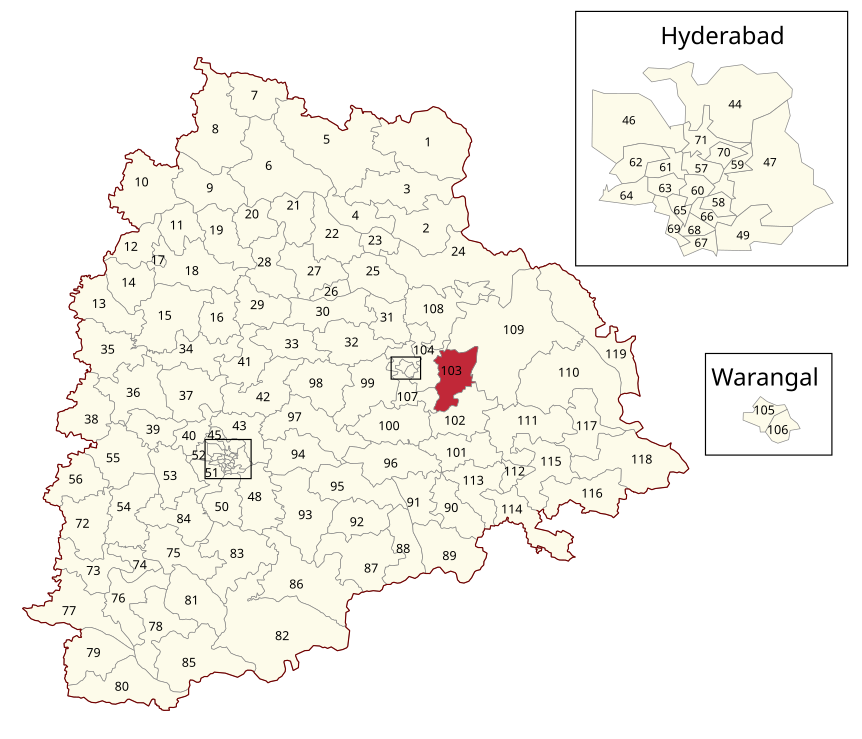
- Location of Narsampet Assembly constituency within Telangana

Constituency details
- Country: India
- Region: South India
- State: Telangana
- District: Warangal Rural Warangal
- Lok Sabha constituency: Mahabubabad
- Established: 1951
- Total electors: 202,010
- Reservation: None

Member of Legislative Assembly
- 3rd Telangana Legislative Assembly
- Incumbent Donthi Madhava Reddy
- Party: Indian National Congress
- Elected year: 2023

Narsampet Assembly constituency is a constituency of Telangana Legislative Assembly, India. It is one of the constituencies in Warangal rural district. It is part of Mahabubabad Lok Sabha constituency.

Donthi Madhava Reddy who contested in election as MLA from Indian National Congress won the seat in 2023. Indian National Congress won in Narsampet after 56 years.

== Mandals ==
The Assembly Constituency presently comprises the following Mandals:

Mandal
Narsampet
Chennaraopet
Duggondi
Nekkonda
Nallabelly
Khanapuram

== Members of Legislative Assembly ==
Duration	Member	Political party
Andhra Pradesh
1957–62	K. Kanaka Rathnamma	Indian National Congress
1962–67	Arshanpalli Venkateshwar Rao	Communist Party of India
1967–72	Katanguri Sudharshan Reddy	Indian National Congress
1972–78	Maddikayala Omkar	Communist Party of India
1978–83	Maddikayala Omkar	Communist Party of India
1983–85	Maddikayala Omkar	Communist Party of India
1985–89	Maddikayala Omkar	Independent politician
1989–94	Maddikayala Omkar	Independent politician
1994–99	Revuri Prakash Reddy	Telugu Desam Party
1999–04	Revuri Prakash Reddy	Telugu Desam Party
2004–09	Kammampati Laxma Reddy	Telangana Rashtra Samithi
2009–14	Revuri Prakash Reddy	Telugu Desam Party
Telangana
2014–18	Donthi Madhava Reddy	Independent politician
2018–23	Peddi Sudarshan Reddy	Telangana Rashtra Samithi
2023-	Donthi Madhava Reddy	Indian National Congress

== Election results ==
=== Telangana Legislative Assembly election, 2023 ===
Telangana Assembly Elections, 2023: Narsampet (Assembly constituency)
Party	Candidate	Votes	%	±%
INC	Donthi Madhava Reddy	104,185	50.73	
BRS	Peddi Sudarshan Reddy	85,296	41.53	
BJP	Kambhampati Prathap (Pulla Rao)	3,062	1.49	
Alliance of Democratic Reforms Party	Gone Yuwa Raj	2,451	1.19	
BSP	Dr. Gundala Madan Kumar	1,531	0.75	
Independent	Pratap Reddy Mogili	1,400	0.68	
Independent	Emmadi Chinni Krishna Yadav	1,347	0.66	
Independent	Prem Lal Banoth (BPN)	1,115	0.54	
Marxist Communist Party of India	Ramesh Peddarapu	1,091	0.53	
NOTA	None of the Above	738	0.36	
Majority		18,889	9.20	
Turnout		2,05,386		
INC gain from BRS		Swing		

=== Telangana Legislative Assembly election, 2018 ===
2018 Telangana Legislative Assembly election: Narsampet
Party	Candidate	Votes	%	±%
TRS	Peddi Sudarshan Reddy	94,430	49.80%	
INC	Donthi Madhava Reddy	77,455	40.85%	
Independent	J. Nageshwar Rao	9,052	4.77%	
NOTA	None of the Above	2,442	1.29%	
Majority		16,975		
Turnout		1,89,631	90.35%	
TRS gain from Independent		Swing		

=== Telangana Legislative Assembly election, 2014 ===
Telangana Assembly Elections, 2014: Narsampet (Assembly constituency)
Party	Candidate	Votes	%	±%
Independent	Donthi Madhava Reddy	76,144	42%	
TRS	Peddi Sudharshan Reddy	57,768	31.86%	
TDP	Revuri Prakash Reddy	34,479	19.02%	
INC	Katthi Venkata Swamy	6,638	3.67%	
Majority		18,376		
Turnout		1,81,337	88.2%	
Independent Politician gain from TDP		Swing		

== See also ==
- List of constituencies of Telangana Legislative Assembly
