= Parkal Assembly constituency =

Constituency of the Telangana legislative assembly in India

Coordinates: 18.20°N 79.70°E

Parkal
- Constituency No. 104 for the Telangana Legislative Assembly
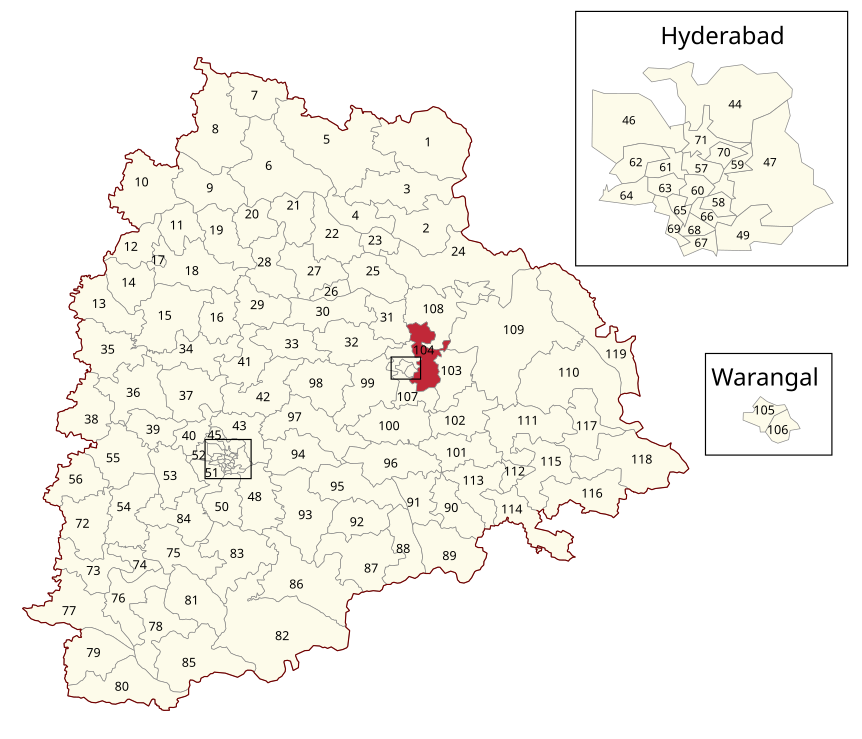
- Location of Parkal Assembly constituency within Telangana

Constituency details
- Country: India
- Region: South India
- State: Telangana
- District: Warangal, Hanamkonda
- Lok Sabha constituency: Warangal
- Established: 1951
- Total electors: 1,87,434
- Reservation: None

Member of Legislative Assembly
- 3rd Telangana Legislative Assembly
- Incumbent Revuri Prakash Reddy
- Party: INC
- Elected year: 2023

Parkal Assembly constituency is a constituency of Telangana Legislative Assembly, India. It is one of 12 constituencies in Warangal district. It is part of Warangal Lok Sabha constituency.

Revuri Prakash Reddy is representing the constituency.

== Mandals ==
The Assembly Constituency presently comprises the following Mandals:

Mandal	Districts
Parkal	Hanamkonda
Atmakur	Hanamkonda
Sangam	Warangal
Geesugonda	Warangal
Nadikuda	Hanamkonda
Damera	Hanamkonda

== Members of Legislative Assembly ==
Duration	Member	Political party
Hyderabad State
1952–57	G. Gopal Rao	People's Democratic Front
Andhra Pradesh
1957–62	Manda Sailu	Indian National Congress
1962–67	Rauthu Narsimha Ramiah	Indian National Congress
1967–72	C. J. Reddy	Bharatiya Jana Sangh
1972–78	Pingali Dharma Reddy	Indian National Congress
1978–83	Bochu Sammaiah	Indian National Congress
1983–85	Bochu Sammaiah	Indian National Congress
1985–89	Vonteru Jayapal	Bharatiya Janata Party
1989–94	Vonteru Jayapal	Bharatiya Janata Party
1994–99	Potharaju Saraiah	Communist Party of India
1999–04	Bojjapalli Rajaiah	Telugu Desam Party
2004–2009	Bandari Shara Rani	Telangana Rashtra Samithi
2009–12	Konda Surekha	Indian National Congress
2012–14	M. Bikshpathi	Telangana Rashtra Samithi
Telangana
2014–18	Challa Dharma Reddy	Telugu Desam Party
2018–23	Challa Dharma Reddy	Telangana Rashtra Samithi
2023-	Revuri Prakash Reddy	Indian National Congress

== Election results ==
=== 2023 ===
2023 Telangana Legislative Assembly election: Parkal
Party	Candidate	Votes	%	±%
INC	Revuri Prakash Reddy	72,573	38.46	
BRS	Challa Dharma Reddy	64,632	34.25	
BJP	Kali Prasad Rao Pagadala	38,735	20.53	
NOTA	None of the Above	966	0.51	
OTH	Other Candidates & Independents	11,775	6.25	
Majority		7,941	4.21	
Turnout		188,681	85.15	
Swing to INC from TRS		Swing		

=== 2018 ===
2018 Telangana Legislative Assembly election: Parkal
Party	Candidate	Votes	%	±%
TRS	Challa Dharma Reddy	105,903	59.64	
INC	Konda Surekha	59,384	33.44	
IND	U. Srinivas	3,996	2.25	
BJP	Pesaru Vijaya Ch. Reddy	2,483	1.40	
NOTA	None of the Above	2,064	1.16	
Majority		46,519	26.20	
Turnout		177,578	89.51	
Swing to TRS from TDP		Swing		

=== 2014 ===
2014 Telangana Legislative Assembly election: Parkal
Party	Candidate	Votes	%	±%
TDP	Challa Dharma Reddy	67,432	41.06	
TRS	Sahoder Reddy Muddasani	58,324	35.52	
INC	Engala Venkatram Reddy	30,283	18.44	
IND	Abbadi Buchi Reddy	3,054	1.86	
BSP	Bochu Saraiah	1,706	1.04	
NOTA	None of the Above	918	0.56	
Majority		9,108	5.54	
Turnout		164,220	84.89	
Swing to TDP from TRS		Swing		

=== 2012 by-election ===
2012 Andhra Pradesh Legislative Assembly by-election: Parkal
Party	Candidate	Votes	%	±%
TRS	M. Bikshpathi	51,936	33.05	
YSRCP	Konda Surekha	50,374	32.05	
Majority		1,562	1.00	
Turnout				
Swing to TRS from INC		Swing		

=== 2009 ===
2009 Andhra Pradesh Legislative Assembly election: Parkal
Party	Candidate	Votes	%	±%
INC	Konda Surekha	69,135	46.79	
TRS	Bikshapathy Moluguri	56,335	38.13	
PRP	Ailaiah Manda	11,968	8.10	
BJP	Gujjula Premendar Reddy	3,497	2.37	
Majority		12,800	8.66	
Turnout		147,753		
Swing to INC from TRS		Swing		

=== 2004 ===
2004 Andhra Pradesh Legislative Assembly election: Parkal (SC)
Party	Candidate	Votes	%	±%
TRS	Bandari Shara Rani	71,773	62.69	
TDP	Dommati Sambaiah	37,176	32.47	
IND	Elthuri Srinivas	3,120	2.73	
IND	Bochu Srinivas	2,413	2.11	
Majority		34,597	30.22	
Turnout		114,482		
Swing to TRS from TDP		Swing		

=== 1999 ===
1999 Andhra Pradesh Legislative Assembly election: Parkal (SC)
Party	Candidate	Votes	%	±%
TDP	Bojjapalli Rajaiah	48,296	52.14	
INC	Pulla Padmavathi	33,202	35.84	
CPI	Swayam Prabha Palleru	6,031	6.51	
IND	Jayapal Onteru	3,263	3.52	
MCPI(S)	Bixpathi Bochu	963	1.04	
IND	Vakkala Shantaiah	881	0.95	
Majority		15,094	16.30	
Turnout		92,636	61.18	
Swing to TDP from CPI		Swing		

=== 1994 ===
1994 Andhra Pradesh Legislative Assembly election: Parkal (SC)
Party	Candidate	Votes	%	±%
CPI	Saraiah Potharaju	33,843	37.83	
INC	Sammaiah Bochu	29,245	32.69	
BJP	Jayapal Vonteru	21,734	24.30	
BSP	Rajendra Kumar Bojugundla	1,997	2.23	
IND	Sandanandam Chiluveru	1,758	1.97	
IND	Odelu Jannu	880	0.98	
Majority		4,598	5.14	
Turnout		92,600	64.66	
Swing to CPI from BJP		Swing		

=== 1989 ===
1989 Andhra Pradesh Legislative Assembly election: Parkal (SC)
Party	Candidate	Votes	%	±%
BJP	Jayapal Vonteru	38,533	48.18	
INC	Sammaiah Bochu	36,933	46.18	
BSP	Narsaiah Madikonda	1,365	1.71	
IND	Bandari Babu	1,163	1.45	
Majority		1,600	2.00	
Turnout		85,167	64.95	
BJP hold		Swing		

=== 1985 ===
1985 Andhra Pradesh Legislative Assembly election: Parkal (SC)
Party	Candidate	Votes	%	±%
BJP	Jayapal V.	34,926	60.91	
INC	Sammaiah Bochu	17,794	31.03	
IND	G. Narsaiah	1,592	2.78	
IND	Raghupathi Rauthi	1,157	2.02	
Majority		17,132	29.88	
Turnout		58,429	54.39	
Swing to BJP from INC		Swing		

=== 1983 ===
1983 Andhra Pradesh Legislative Assembly election: Parkal (SC)
Party	Candidate	Votes	%	±%
INC	Sammaiah Bochu	26,140	40.30	
BJP	Jayapal V.	18,845	29.05	
IND	Bojjapalli Rajaiah	16,211	24.99	
LKD	Damodar Gunti	3,665	5.65	
Majority		7,295	11.25	
Turnout		66,845	69.36	
INC hold		Swing		

=== 1978 ===
1978 Andhra Pradesh Legislative Assembly election: Parkal (SC)
Party	Candidate	Votes	%	±%
INC(I)	Bochu Sammaiah	25,656	44.47	
JP	Marepalli Eliah	16,869	29.24	
INC	Rauthu Narsimhamaiah	9,398	16.29	
IND	Bhupelli Odelu	4,383	7.60	
IND	Gunti Sudarshanam	723	1.25	
IND	P. Muthaiah	666	1.15	
Majority		8,787	15.23	
Turnout		59,787	64.79	
Swing to INC(I) from INC		Swing		

=== 1972 ===
1972 Andhra Pradesh Legislative Assembly election: Parkal
Party	Candidate	Votes	%	±%
INC	Pingali Dharma Reddy	33,116	55.10	
ABJS	Chandupatla Janga Reddy	18,427	30.66	
CPI	Kuthru Tirupethi Reddy	7,360	12.25	
IND	Katanguru Raghava Reddy	744	1.24	
Majority		14,689	24.44	
Turnout		62,570	66.33	
Swing to INC from ABJS		Swing		

=== 1967 ===
1967 Andhra Pradesh Legislative Assembly election: Parkal
Party	Candidate	Votes	%	±%
ABJS	C. J. Reddy	18,751	35.08	
INC	B. Kailasam	16,889	31.60	
IND	M. Mallaiah	9,777	18.29	
IND	K. N. Reddy	5,195	9.72	
SWA	C. R. Reddy	2,839	5.31	
Majority		1,862	3.48	
Turnout		56,868	68.73	
Swing to ABJS from INC		Swing		

=== 1962 ===
1962 Andhra Pradesh Legislative Assembly election: Parkal (SC)
Party	Candidate	Votes	%	±%
INC	Rauthu Narsimha Ramaiah	12,043	53.03	
CPI	Doodapaka Narsimharajaiah	7,442	32.77	
SWA	Gunti Sudershan	3,224	14.20	
Majority		4,601	20.26	
Turnout		24,497	40.97	
INC hold		Swing		

=== 1957 ===
1957 Andhra Pradesh Legislative Assembly election: Parkal (SC) (2-Member Constituency)
Party	Candidate	Votes	%	±%
INC	Manda Sailu	20,313	22.34	
INC	K. Keshav Reddy	18,923	20.81	
PDF	K. Prakash Reddy	16,306	17.93	
IND	C. Vasudeva Reddy	15,072	16.57	
PSP	P. Kurnel	12,285	13.51	
IND	V. Narsiah	8,043	8.84	
Majority		2,617	2.88	
Turnout		90,942	82.47	
INC hold		Swing		

=== 1952 ===
1952 Hyderabad Legislative Assembly election: Parkal
Party	Candidate	Votes	%	±%
INC	Katangur Keshava Reddy	20,413	64.65	
Socialist	Pingli Dharma Reddy	11,162	35.35	
Majority		9,251	29.30	
Turnout		31,575	67.45	
INC win (new seat)				

== See also ==
- List of constituencies of Telangana Legislative Assembly
