= Donthi Madhava Reddy =

Indian politician

Member of Legislative Assembly, Telangana
- Incumbent
- Assumed office 2023
- Preceded by: Peddi Sudarshan Reddy
- Constituency: Narsampet
- In office 2014–2018
- Preceded by: Revuri Prakash Reddy
- Succeeded by: Peddi Sudarshan Reddy

Personal details
- Party: Indian National Congress

Donthi Madhava Reddy (born 16 August 1961) is an Indian politician from Telangana state. He is a member of the Telangana Legislative Assembly from Narasampet Assembly constituency in Warangal district. He represents Indian National Congress and won the 2023 Telangana Legislative Assembly election.

== Early life and education ==
Reddy is from an agricultural family in Narasampet, Warangal district. His father late Narasimha Reddy was a farmer. He completed Class 12 in 1976 at Government Junior College, Narsampet and later discontinued his studies.

== Career ==
Reddy began with as a leader of the local body and served as sarpanch of Ameenanabad village, Warangal district, from 1981 to 1988. Later, he became the chairman of the D.C.C.B. Warangal district from 1995 to 2000.

He won as an MLA for the second time from Narasampet Assembly constituency representing Indian National Congress in the 2023 Telangana Legislative Assembly election. He polled 104,185 votes and defeated his nearest rival, Peddi Sudarshan Reddy of Bharat Rashtra Samithi, by a margin of 18,889 votes. Earlier in 2014, he became an MLA for the first time as an independent. However, he lost the 2018 Telangana Legislative Assembly election.
