= Pedda Korpole =

Pedda Korpole Korpole
- village
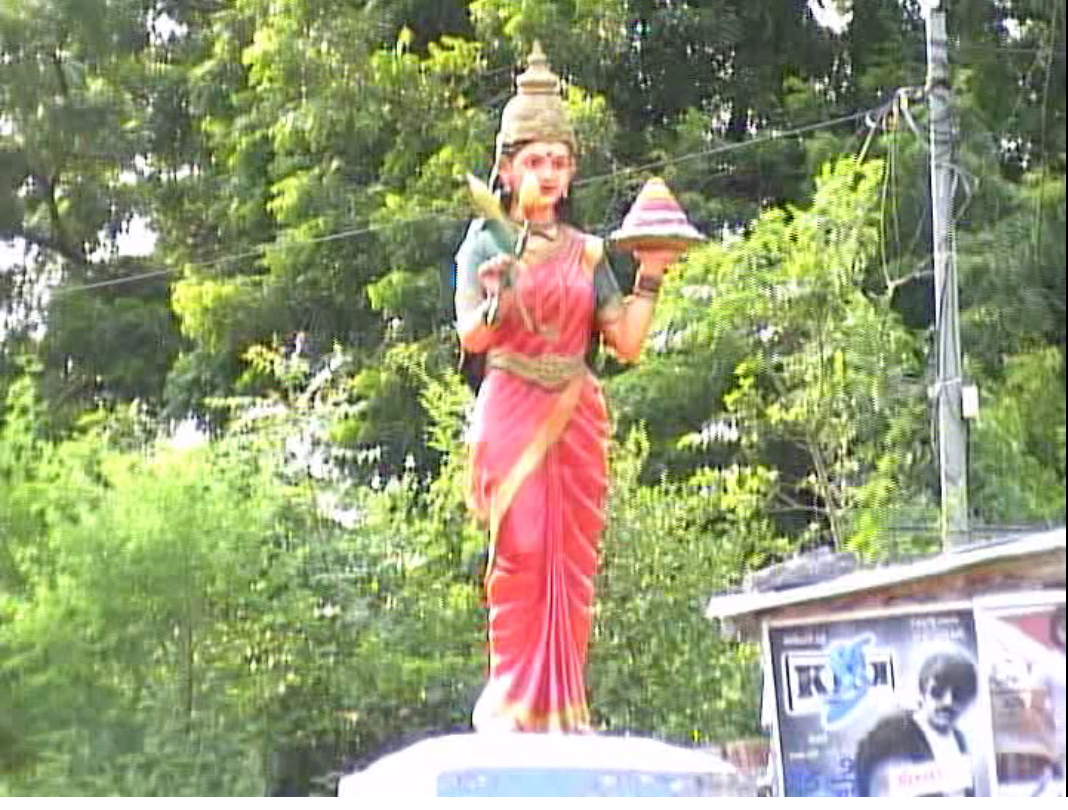
- Telangana Talli Statue in Pedda Korpole

- Location in Telangana, India Pedda Korpole (India)
- Coordinates: 17°45′4″N 79°51′8″E
- Country: India
- State: Telangana
- District: Warangal district
- Talukas: Pedda Korpole

Government
  - Body: Gram Panchayat Pedda Korpole

Population (2012)
  - Total: 3,114

Languages
  - Official: Telugu
- Time zone: UTC+5:30 (IST)
- PIN: 506112

Pedda Korpole is a village located in Nekkonda of Warangal district in Telangana state, India. It is located very near to the Kazipet Vijayawada railway line. It comes under Narsampet (Assembly constituency), Mahabubabad (Lok Sabha constituency) and Mahabubabad Revenue Division. Village has huge population whose main occupation is agriculture. This Village produces Turmeric root, Cotton, Paddy, Maize and all types of Vegetables.

Village has peaceful climate with an artificial lake adjacent to village and A stream(Vatti vagu) flows from this village which are main source for water for Agriculture. Village has a reservoir called "Kattu" built on "Vatti Vagu" which serves the water for agricultural needs for the nearby 3 villages. Village also has another stream called "Lotla Vagu" which merges in "Vattivagu" at "Kattu".

Village has 7 temples and a mosque those are 1. "Nagendra swamy Temple"(Located in Chinna Korpole road), 2."Shivalayam" (Located in Chinna korpole road), 3."Hanuman Temple" (Located at village pond) 4."Madar saheb mosque" (Located at Kesamudram road) 5. "Ramalayam" (Located at Nekkonda road) 6. Muthyalamma Temple. The speciality is "Hnuman temple" and mosque are located opposite to each other. 7."Nagendra swammy" Temple is famous in nearby villages in Nekkonda mandal.

Pedda Korpole has two historical places called Savadi gadda and Ramnavami gadda. Savadi gadda has been treated as center of the village, and Dussehra(Vijaya dashami) is celebrated here since the village built here. People of village and people from village who are staying in other places attend the festival celebrated here once in a year. And Ramulavari gadda has old statues of Lord Rama, Sita and Hanuman which were discovered in the earth of the village while digging earth for the construction of a house.

People from this village working in Government jobs, private companies, Software Industry, Pharmaceutical Industry, Cine Industry, Banks, Business and many more private sectors. There are many graduates and some people are staying in foreign countries like UK, Australia and US.
