= Nachina Pally =

Nachinapally is a village and Gram panchayat of Duggondi mandal, Warangal district, in Telangana state.
