= Gangadevipalli =

- Village
- Location in Telangana, India Gangadevipalli (India)
- Coordinates: 17°57′17″N 79°42′52″E
- Country: India
- State: Telangana
- District: Warangal district

Languages
  - Official: Telugu
- Time zone: UTC+5:30 (IST)
- Vehicle registration: TS
- Website: www.gangadevipally.org/english/default_english.htm

Gangadevipalli or Gangadevipally, is a village in Geesugonda mandal of Warangal district in the Indian state of Telangana. It is situated about 12 km away from the district headquarters of Warangal and has a population of 1277.

The village has earned itself a reputation as a model village of the country.

== Governance ==
The village is governed by the village Panchayat.

Gangadevipalli was once under the jurisdiction of the village panchayat of Machapur. In September, 1994, it earned the status of a special village panchayat. In the first two Panchayat elections of 1995 and 2001, all the elected representatives were women. In 2006, Mr. Kiruthik Pranav was elected as the Sarpanch. The current Sarpanch is again a woman named Ms. Intla Santhi.

Since its recognition as a special Panchayat, the villagers have been working hard to make it a model village. It was as a result of this effort that in 2007, this village received the Nirmal Gram Puraskar. This village has the distinction of having an all-women membership in the Gram Panchayat including the Sarpanch in the 1995 and 2001 elections. In the recent times, this village has earned itself a reputation not only at the state level but also at the national level as a result of the visits by several prominent personalities from various political parties.

== Development activities ==
Gangadevipalli has earned several accolades from one and all for the villagers' collective efforts in developing the village. Some of the indicators of this development are 100% literacy, complete alcohol prohibition, availability of toilets in every home, family planning for all households and fluoride-free drinking water. The villagers have proven that through collective effort and discipline, one can solve problems and make their village a better place to live in. The boards on either side of the entrance to the village show their commitment and discipline.

== Development Committees ==
Gangadevipalli has 13 committees. The committees play a major role in the village's everyday governance. One person from each household is involved in some committee or the other. Though there are multiple political parties, the villagers are united when it comes to development activities. The villagers solve all of their disputes within the village. There were no police complaints registered in the past 14 years.

The village is divided into 18 sectors. Each committee can consist of 11 to 25 members.

A few of the committees and their functions are listed below

- Alcohol prohibition committee - To prevent the sale of alcohol in the village and prevent smuggling of liquor into the village from other villages.
- Drinking water management committee - To take care of water supply, cleanliness and hygiene around the water taps. The villagers got water tankers with the help of a non-profit called Lodhi and a fluoride-free water purification plant with the help of the Tata group. This water purification plant produces surplus drinking water which is sold to other areas and thus makes some money for the village.
- Education committee - Management of maintenance of schools.
- Ganga dish committee - Issuance of cable connections to people
- Health committee - Protection of health, prevention of seasonal diseases and family planning
- Mothers' committee - Takes care of pregnant women and new mothers with the cooperation of the local Anganwadi group.
- Loan recovery committee - To ensure that farmers pay their bank loans on time
- Village development committee - All development activities in the village

A committee will soon be formed for governance of the recently installed community WiFi.

The village has 14 cooperative savings unions.

== Public services ==
=== Drinking water plant ===
The villagers have established a drinking water project in the village through the help of non-profit organizations without any help from the government. This de-fluorination project has been in operation from 1996. The villagers can get 20 liters of purified drinking water for a price of Re. 1 using a smart card.

=== Free Cable TV ===
The cable TV network in this village is free. Each household pays an upfront deposit of Rs. 2200 to get a cable connection. This amount is deposited in a bank and the cable services are maintained using the interest accrued on this amount. There are no monthly charges for using this service.

=== Free Community WiFi ===
Volunteers of the Hyderabad wing of the Free Software Movement of India (FSMI), known as Swecha have undertaken a project with the co-operation of the villagers to set up a community WiFi network. Apart from serving internet, the central hub of the WiFi hub - a device known as FreedomBox, a server for hosting free and open-source software for protecting privacy on the internet. Since the FreedomBox project can also be used as a server on the local network, a lot of free services like VoIP calling and chat, internet radio, digital library, offline Wikipedia etc. have been provided to the villagers. This project was an inspiration for several other nearby villages who want to host similar community WiFi projects in their villages.

This project was funded by donations. The village panchayat pays the monthly internet bill to the ISP. All villagers and visitors can use the WiFi for free.

== Leadership ==
Gangadevipalli's development was fueled by the efforts of several leaders like Koosam Rajamouli, Gone Cheralu, Koosam Lingaiah, Challa Mallaiah, Koosam Narayana, Pelli Rajayya and others.

Mr. Rajamouli describes his experience as follows.

"It was difficult in the beginning to get all the people to agree on the same things. But we didn't give up. We tried to teach everyone the importance of development. Eventually, people started appreciating our thinking. They started volunteering to help with every development activity. We take every decision by voting and choose the option with the majority of votes. Most villagers are part of some committee or the other. So, most activities are performed with dedication and a feeling of ownership. This village's progress is the result of the collective efforts of all the villagers."

== Recognition ==
- Recognized as the best panchayat in the country in 2007. A panel of judges presided by Mr. Subhash Kashap, the former General Secretary of Lok Sabha made this selection. The Academy of survey and research of rural India presented this award. Union minister Mr. Manishankar Ayyar was the chief advisor.
- Awarded the Nirmal Gram Puraskar, a national award, by Dr. A.P.J. Abdul Kalam, the former President of India.
- Selected as the best panchayat of Warangal district 4 times.
- Awarded by the district collector in 1999 for the people's membership in cooperative savings societies
- NGOs from Canada and Bangladesh have studied the local self-governance model of Gangadevipalli. Several group from Tamil Nadu, Pondicherry and Rajasthan have visited the village. Most IAS officers in training who come to the district study this village.
- In 2005, Mr. Challappa, the commissioner of Gram Panchayats remarked, "Every district in the country should have one such village."
- This village was adopted by Andhra Bank under the Pattabhi Model Village Development Scheme.
- This village had visitors from 20 different countries so far.
- This village was featured in a cover story by Eenadu in their weekly magazine.
