= Kancha Ilaiah =

Indian scholar, activist and writer (born 1952)

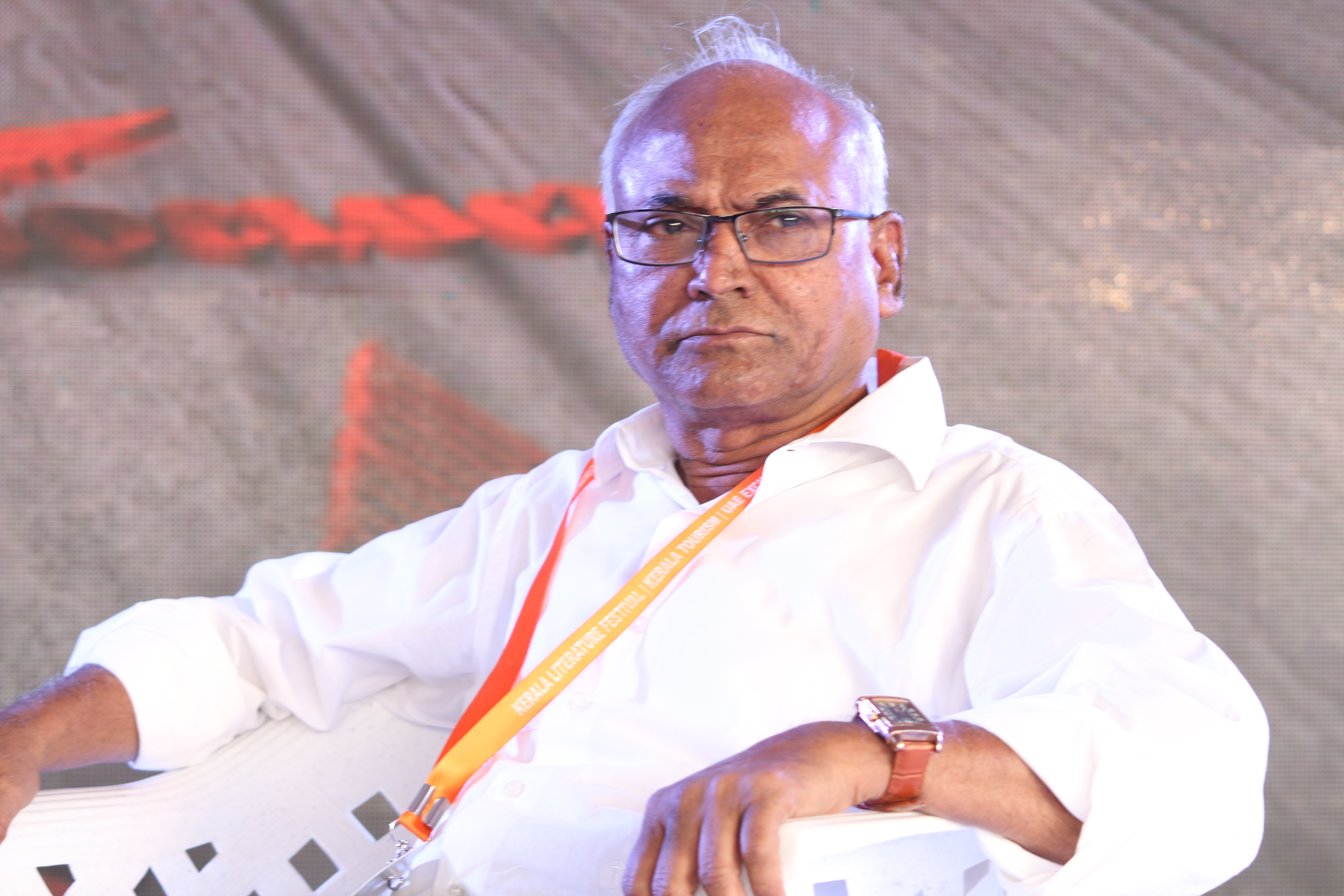
- Ilaiah at Kerala Literature Festival in 2018
- Born: 5 October 1952 (age 73); Papaiahpet, Warangal, Hyderabad State, India (now in Telangana, India)
- Education: Osmania University (M.A. & M.Phil in Political Science)
- Occupations: Political theorist; writer; activist
- Awards: Mahatma Jyotirao Phule Award (2000); Nehru Fellow (1994-97)

Kancha Ilaiah Shepherd (born 5 October 1952) is an Indian political theorist, writer and a Dalit rights activist. He is a former professor of political science at Osmania University and was the Director of the Centre for the Study of Social Exclusion and Inclusive Policy at Maulana Azad National Urdu University. He writes in both English and Telugu languages. His main domain of study and activism are the annihilation of caste.

== Early life ==
Kancha Ilaiah was born in the village of Papaiahpet of Chennaraopet mandal, Warangal district in present-day Telangana. He belongs to the Kuruma sheepherd caste, a community of herders, designated as an Other Backward Class. Ilaiah's father Kancha Komuraiah was always away from home while grazing sheep. The dominant figure in the family was his mother. Ilaiah credited his mother, Kancha Kattamma, as pivotal in shaping his political thought.

Ilaaih suffixed 'Shepherd' to his name symbolically, as he comes from a shepherding family.

== Professional life ==
Ilaiah received an M.A. degree in political science and an M.Phil., awarded for his study of land reform in undivided Andhra Pradesh. He has been a recipient of the Mahatma Jyotirao Phule Award and was a Nehru Fellow between 1994 and 1997.

Ilaiah earned a Ph.D on the basis of his work exploring the political dimension of Buddhism, culminating in God as Political Philosopher - Buddha's Challenge to Brahminism. He later elaborated several of its key themes in his best-known book. Why I Am Not a Hindu: A Sudra critique of Hindutva philosophy, culture and political economy (1996). A chapter of the book, Hindu Death and Our Death has been reprinted in the book The Hunger of the Republic: Our Present in Retrospect, part of the India Since the 90s series published by Tulika Books.

Ilaiah has encouraged proficiency in the English language for Dalits, arguing that it would allow Dalits in India to intellectually engage the world outside India without non-Dalits speaking "for them". In May 2016, in protest against "Brahmanic hegemony" he says continues to persist in India, Ilaiah appended "Shepherd" to his name. Ilaiah identified in this choice recognition and reaffirmation of his family origins. As an English-language proper noun rather than its equivalent in an Indian language, "Shepherd" is meant to demonstrate a symbolic break with the cultural norms Ilaiah believed Brahmins sought to "impose" on Indian society. Ilaiah characterises his name change as a tool to break these norms and to value the work of what he terms "productive classes:" including Scheduled Castes and OBCs.

Kancha Ilaiah is an Ambedkarite. As an anti-caste activist, Ilaiah is often misidentified by the media as being a Dalit himself. Ilaiah identifies himself as a Sudra intellectual.

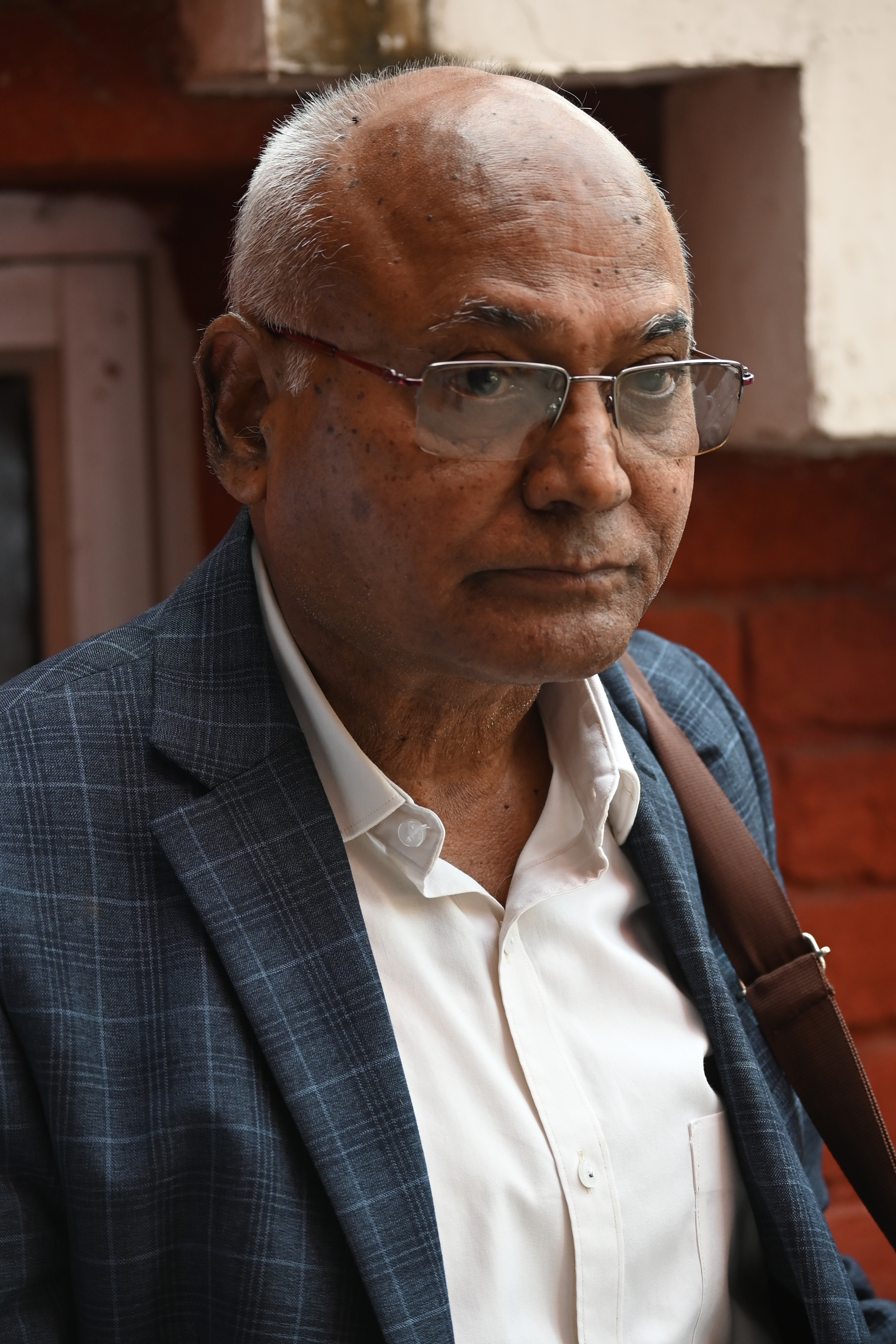
Kancha Ilaiah in 2024

In November 2015, Ilaiah stated that if Vallabhbhai Patel, the first Deputy Prime Minister of the Republic of India credited with accession of a princely states into India amidst the intense violence and bloodletting that followed the creation of Pakistan, had been Prime Minister of India, India "would have become Pakistan".

== Criticism ==
While working as an associate professor in the Department of Political Science at Osmania University, several of Ilaiah's colleagues as well as academics affiliated with the university expressed, in an open-letter, their concern with respect to certain articles and opinions that Ilaiah had contributed to a local newspaper and advised him against writing material that could inflame sectarian discontent or prejudice.

In April 2016, Ilaiah gave a controversial remark that vegetarianism is anti-nationalism. On 18 September 2017, T. G. Venkatesh, a member of Indian Parliament representing the Telugu Desam Party and a prominent leader of the Arya Vysya said at a press conference that Ilaiah was a traitor and should be hanged because his writings were "intended to divide society." Ilaiah alleged that the members of Arya Vysya community had tried to kill him and lodged a police complaint when Arya Vysya community members attacked his car in 2017.

In September 2017, Andhra Pradesh Chief Minister Chandrababu Naidu banned Ilaiah's book on Vyshas for hurting the sentiments of the community after Vysyas community members protested and demanded a ban on the book.

== Appointments ==
Among Ilaiah's official appointments have been:

- Retired Director, Centre for Study of Social Exclusion and Inclusive Policy (CSSEIP) at Maulana Azad National Urdu University, Hyderabad
- Former Head of department, Political Science, Osmania University, Hyderabad
- Member of National Research Committee constituted by the Ministry of Social Justice, New Delhi
- Member – Indian Council of Social Science Research (ICSSR), New Delhi
- Former Member of the National Book Trust, Ministry of Human Resources Development, Government of India, New Delhi for three years
- Member of the Planning Commission Sub Committee to formulate an agenda for land reforms for the XI Five Year Plan
- Member of the UGC Constitutional Committee to oversee the implementation of OBC reservations in all Central and State universities in India
- Former member of the Executive Council of Periyar Maniammai University (Tamil Nadu)

== Selected publications ==
English language publications:

- Ilaiah, K. Why I Am Not a Hindu: A Sudra critique of Hindutva philosophy, culture and political economy (Calcutta: Samya, 1996) ISBN 8185604185
- Ilaiah, K. God as Political Philosopher: Buddha's Challenge to Brahminism (Calcutta: Samya, 2001) ISBN 8185604444
- Ilaiah, K. Buffalo Nationalism: A Critique of Spiritual Fascism (Calcutta: Samya, 2004) ISBN 818560469X
- Ilaiah, K., & Vyam, D. (2007). Turning the Pot, Tilling the Land: Dignity of Labour in Our Times. Pondicherry: Navayana Pub. ISBN 9788189059095 OCLC 184927533
- Ilaiah, K. Post-Hindu India: A Discourse in Dalit-Bahujan Socio-Spiritual and Scientific Revolution (SAGE Publications Pvt. Ltd, 2009) ISBN 9788132104339
- Ilaiah, K. Untouchable God: A Novel on Caste and Race (Kolkata: Samya, 2011) ISBN 9788185604336 OCLC 828612357
- Ilaiah, K (1989). The State and Repressive Culture: The Andhra Experience. Hyderabad: Swecha Prachuranalu. OCLC 21518320
- Bonner, A., Ilaiah, K., Saha, S. K., Engineer, A. A., & Heuze, G. (1994). Democracy in India: A Hollow Shell. Washington D.C: The American University Press. ISBN 1879383268 OCLC 470188534
- Ilaiah, K; Nehru Memorial Museum and Library; Centre for Contemporary Studies (1995). Caste or Class or Caste-class: A study in Dalitabhujan Consciousness and Struggles in Andhra Pradesh in 1980s. New Delhi: Centre for Contemporary Studies, Nehru Memorial Museum and Library OCLC 436463940
- Ilaiah, K., & Nehru Memorial Museum and Library. (1996). In Search of the Roots of Anti-Caste Struggle: A Dalitist Reading of the Buddhist Discourse. New Delhi: Centre for Contemporary Studies, Nehru Memorial Museum and Library. OCLC 863611670
- Ilaiah, K., & Nehru Memorial Museum and Library. (1997). Productive Labour, Consciousness and History: The Dalitabahujan Alternative. New Delhi: Centre for Contemporary Studies, Nehru Memorial Museum and Library. OCLC 793342817
- Ilaiah, K (1999). Reservations: Experience as Framework of Debate. OCLC 606215716
- D'Souza, J., Ilaiah, K., Raj, U., & Dalit Freedom Network. (2004). Dalit Freedom: Now and Forever; The Epic Struggle for Dalit Forever. OCLC 930036331
- Nisar, M., Kandasamy, M., & Ilaiah, K. (2007). Ayyankali: Dalit Leader of Organic Protest. Calicut, Kerala: Other Books. ISBN 9788190388764 OCLC 437026595
- Ilaiah, K (2010). The Weapon of the Other: Dalitbahujan Writings and the Remaking of Indian Nationalist Thought. Delhi: Longman. ISBN 9788177582468 OCLC 502268560

Telugu language publications:

- ఐలయ్య, క. మన తత్వం: దళిత బహుజన తాత్వికత. హైదరాబాద్: హైదరాబాద్ బుక్ ట్రస్ట్
