= Rajapalle =

Rajapalle is a village in Warangal district of Telangana State, India. It is located 2 kilometres (1.2 mi) from Narsampet, which is mandal of Warangal Rural. The village is administrated by a sarpanch, an elected representative of the village.
