= Sthambampally =

Sthambampally is a village in Geesugonda mandal of Warangal district, Telangana, India. It is 7 km away from Warangal Railway Station. Janipirilu was joined into Sthambampally in 1998. The population is around 3000. The major communities are Vaddea Rajulu, Munnuru Kapu, Padhma Shali and Muslim. Major crops are cotton, corn, tomato and other vegetables. It has 60% literacy. The landmarks are Government Public School up to 10th standard, Hanuman Temple and water tank.
