= Anantasagar =

Village in Telangana, India

Ananthasagar is a Village in Hasanparthy Mandal in Warangal District of Telangana State, India. It belongs to Telangana region. As part Telangana Districts re-organisation, Ananthasagar Village Hasanparthy Mandal reorganised from Warangal District to Warangal Urban district to HANAMKONDA DISTRICT. It is located 19 km towards North from District headquarters Warangal. 7 km from Hasanparthy.

Ananthasagar Pin code is 506371 and postal head office is Hasanparthy.

Jaigiri (3 km), Madipalle (6 km), Somadevarapalle (6 km), Hasanparthy (6 km), and Chinthagattu (7 km) are the nearby Villages to Ananthasagar. Ananthasagar is surrounded by Hasanparthy Mandal towards East, Kamalapur Mandal towards North, Huzurabad Mandal towards North, Hanamkonda Mandal towards South.

Warangal, Karimnagar, Jangaon, and Siddipet are the nearby Cities to Ananthasagar.

This Place is in the border of the Warangal District and Karimnagar District. Karimnagar District Elkathurthi is North towards this place.
