= Panikera =

- village
- Location within Telangana Location within India
- Coordinates: 17.827°N 79.817°E
- Country: India
- State: Telangana
- District: Warangal
- Block: Nekkonda
- Elevation: 239 m (784 ft)

Population (2011)
  - Total: 1,136
- Time zone: UTC+5:30 (IST)
- ISO 3166 code: IN-TG
- Vehicle registration: TS

Panikera (sometimes spelled Panikara) is a village in Telangana, India, It is located in the Nekkonda mandal and block of the Warangal district.

== Demographics ==
According to the 2011 census of India, the village has a population of 1136, including 556 males and 580 females.
