= Ponugondla village =

Ponugondla(పొనగ౦డౢ) is a panchayat located in the Regonda Mandal in Warangal District of Telangana State, India. The native languages of Ponugondla are Telugu, Urdu, and English. Villagers mainly communicate with each other using either Telugu or Urdu. The Ponugondla village is located at the latitude 18.01 and longitude 79.58, and is 251 meters above sea level. Ponugondla follows India Standard Time (IST), which is 5:30 hours ahead of Coordinated Universal Time (UTC).

== Government ==
The local government of Ponugondla includes: Bhupalpalle Assembly Constituency, Assembly MLA of Madhusudana Chary Sirikonda and Warangal (SC) Parliamentary in the Lok Sabha Constituency.

== Educational Facilities near Ponugondla ==
Kakatiya Junior College, Regonda Prathamika Konnatha Patashala (Government High School)

పొనగ౦డౢ
