= Revuri Prakash Reddy =

Indian politician

Member of Legislative Assembly, Telangana
- Incumbent
- Assumed office 7 December 2023
- Preceded by: Challa Dharma Reddy
- Constituency: Parkal

Member of Legislative Assembly, Andhra Pradesh
- In office 2009–2014
- Preceded by: Kammampati Laxma Reddy
- Succeeded by: Donthi madhava reddy
- Constituency: Narsampet
- In office 1994–2004
- Preceded by: Maddikayala Omkar
- Succeeded by: Kammampati Laxma Reddy
- Constituency: Narsampet

Personal details
- Party: Indian National Congress
- Other political affiliations: Telugu Desam Party

Revuri Prakash Reddy (born 1952) is an Indian politician from Telangana state. He is an MLA from Parkal Assembly constituency in Warangal district. He represents Indian National Congress and won the 2023 Telangana Legislative Assembly election.

== Early life and education ==
Reddy was born in Narsampet to late Revuri Narayana Reddy. He passed Intermediate in 1974 from Government Junior College, Sirpur Kaghaz Nagar, Adilabad district. Later, he discontinued his studies.

== Career ==
Reddy won from Parkal Assembly constituency representing Indian National Congress in the 2023 Telangana Legislative Assembly election. He polled 72,573 votes and defeated his nearest rival, Challa Dharma Reddy of Bharat Rashtra Samithi by a narrow margin of 7,941 votes. Earlier he won 3 times as MLA representing TDP from Narsampet constituency in 1994, 1999 and 2009
