= Maddikayala Omkar =

Indian politician from Telangana state

Maddikayala Omkar (1924 – 17 October 2008) was an Indian politician from Telangana state. He won as MLA from Narsampet constituency from 1972 to 1989.

== Early life ==
Maddikayala Omkar was born in 1924 to Maddikayala Ramaiah and Anant Lakshmi in Suryapet District, Atmakuru Mandal, Epuru Village, Telangana State.

== Political career ==
At the age of 16, Maddikayala Omkar joined the Andhra Mahasabha as a volunteer in 1944 against the dictatorship of the Nizam Nawab. He instilled the spirit of struggle in the people and made them partners in the struggle. He was a heroic Telangana farmer who took up a gun and took up arms in the armed struggle for the liberation of land, Bhukti and Vettichakiri.

Omkar joined the CPM party during the movement. He worked in Narsampet as per the instructions of the party for the formation of CPM in Warangal district according to the needs of the party. Omkar contested the 1972 Assembly elections as a CPM candidate from Narsampeta constituency and won against the Congress candidate Pendem Kattaiah and was elected as an MLA for the first time. Omkar contested as a CPM candidate from Narsampeta constituency in 1978 assembly election and won against Congress candidate Ganta Pratap Reddy and in 1983 against Congress candidate Pendem Kattaiah respectively.

Onkar was expelled from the CPM on the pretext of anti-party activities. He then contested as an independent candidate from Narsampeta constituency (in the name of MCPI) in 1985 elections and won against his nearest Congress candidate Mandava Upender Rao and in 1989 elections as an independent candidate against Congress candidate Epuru Janardhan Reddy. He lost in the 1994 election to Telugu Desam Party candidate Revuri Prakash Reddy by a narrow margin of 87 votes.

== Death ==
Maddikayala Omkar died on 17 October 2008.
