= Challa Dharma Reddy =

Indian politician

Challa Dharma Reddy (born 25 May 1967) is an Indian politician from Telangana state. He is a former two time Member of the Legislative Assembly from Parkal Assembly constituency in Warangal district representing the Telugu Desam Party.

== Early life ==
Reddy is from Parkal, Warangal district, Telangana state. He is the son of Challa Mallareddy. He completed his Bachelor of Arts in 2018 at Kakatiya College, Hanumakonda which is affiliated with Kakatiya University, Warangal. He runs his own business and declared assets worth Rs.12 crore in 2014 and Rs.39 crore in 2023, in his affidavit to the Election Commission of India.

== Career ==
Reddy won the Parkal Assembly constituency in the 2014 Andhra Pradesh Legislative Assembly election representing the Telugu Desam Party. He polled 67,432 votes and defeated his nearest rival, Sahoder Reddy Muddasani of the Telangana Rashtra Samithi, by a margin of 9,108. Later, he shifted to Telangana Rashtra Samithi and won the Parkal seat again in the 2018 Telangana Legislative Assembly election. But he lost the 2023 Telangana Legislative Assembly election also on TRS ticket.
