= Rayaparthy =

- village
- Location in Telangana, India
- Coordinates: 17.704212°N 79.608121°E
- Country: India
- State: Telangana
- District: Warangal district
- Talukas: Rayaparthy

Population
  - Total: 58,377 (as per 2,011 senses)

Languages
  - Official: Telugu
- Time zone: UTC+5:30 (IST)
- PIN: 506314
- Vehicle registration: TG 24
- Website: telangana.gov.in

Rayaparthy is a village and a mandal in Warangal district in the state of Telangana in India.

- List of Villages in Raiparthy Mandal

1. Burahanpalle 2. Gannaram 3. Gattikal 4. Jagannadhapalle 5. Katrapalle 6. Keshavapur 7. Kolanpalle 8. Kondapur 9. Konduru 10. Kothur 11. Muripirala 12. Mylaram 13. Ookal 14. Perikaid 15. Pothureddipalle 16. Raiparthy 17. Sannur 18. Thirmalayapalle .
