= Sangam, Hanamkonda district =

Sangem
- mandal, village
- Location in Telangana, India Sangem (India)
- Coordinates: 17°53′45″N 79°34′15″E
- Country: India
- State: Telangana
- District: Warangal district
- Named for: Sangameswara Temple

Population
  - Total: 6,939

Languages
- Time zone: UTC+5:30
- Postal code: 506329
- Vehicle registration: TS24
- Website: telangana.gov.in

Sangem is a village and a mandal in Warangal district in the state of Telangana in India.

== Panchayats ==
The following is the list of village panchayats in Sangam mandal per the 2011 Census of India listing.

- Kuntapally
- Venkatapur (Haveli)
- Katrepale(Haveli)
- Kapulakanaparthy
- Ashalapally
- Gavicherla
- Ramachandrapur
- Lohitha
- Shapur
- Theegarajupalle
- Thimmapur
- Sangam
- Chintalapalle
- Pallaruguda
- Mondrai
- Narlavai
- Mummadivaram
- Elugur(Rangampet)
- Nallabelle
- Gandhinagar
