= Nallabelly =

- village
- Location in Telangana, India Nallabelly (India)
- Coordinates: 18°02′25″N 79°51′40″E
- Country: India
- State: Telangana
- District: Warangal district
- Talukas: Nallabelly

Languages
  - Official: Telugu
- Time zone: UTC+5:30 (IST)
- Vehicle registration: TS 03
- Website: telangana.gov.in

Nallabelly or Nallabelli is a village and a mandal in Warangal district in the state of Telangana in India.

== Villages ==
- Arshanpalle
- Arvaiahpally
- Asaravelli
- Talla Govindapur(koya adivasi)
- Gundlapahad
- Kannaraopet
- Kondapur(koya adivasi)
- Lenkalpalle
- Medapalle (adivasi)
- Muchimpula
- Nagrajpalle
- Nallabelly
- Nandigama
- Narakkapet
- Rampur
- Ramteertham
- Rangapuram
- Relakunta
- Rudragudem
- Shanigaram
