= Duggondi =

Coordinates: 18°01′16″N 79°47′54″E

- village
- Interactive map of Duggondi
- Country: India
- State: Telangana
- District: Warangal district
- Talukas: Duggondi

Languages
  - Official: Telugu
- Time zone: UTC+5:30 (IST)
- PIN: 506331
- Vehicle registration: TS 03
- Website: telangana.gov.in

Duggondi is a village and a mandal in Warangal district in the state of Telangana in India.

List of Villages in Duggondi Mandal 1. Adavi Rangapur 2. Chalparthi 3. Duggondi 4. Keshwapur 5. Laxmipur 6. Madhira Mandapalle 7. Mahammadapur 8. Mallampalle 9. Mandapalle 10. Muddunoor 11. Nachinapalle 12. Polaram 13. Ponakal 14. Reballe 15. Rekampalle 16. Timmampet 17. Togarrai 18. Venkatapur .19. Girnivbavi
