= Chennaraopet =

- village
- Location in Telangana, India Chennaraopet (India)
- Coordinates: 17°52′55″N 79°52′10″E
- Country: India
- State: Telangana
- District: Warangal district
- Talukas: Chennaraopet

Languages
  - Official: Telugu
- Time zone: UTC+5:30 (IST)
- Postal code: 506332
- Vehicle registration: TS
- Website: telangana.gov.in

Chennaraopet is a village and a mandal in Warangal district in the state of Telangana in India.

== Villages ==
- Akkalchedu
- Ameenabad
- Chennaraopet
- Gurijala (Present Narsampet mandal)
- Jhalli
- Konapuram
- Lingagiri
- Lingapuram
- Papaiahpeta
- Suripalle
- Thimmarainipahad
- Upparapally
- Yellaigudem
