= Nekkonda =

Coordinates: 16°46′51″N 78°13′34″E

Nekkonda నెక్కొండ
- village
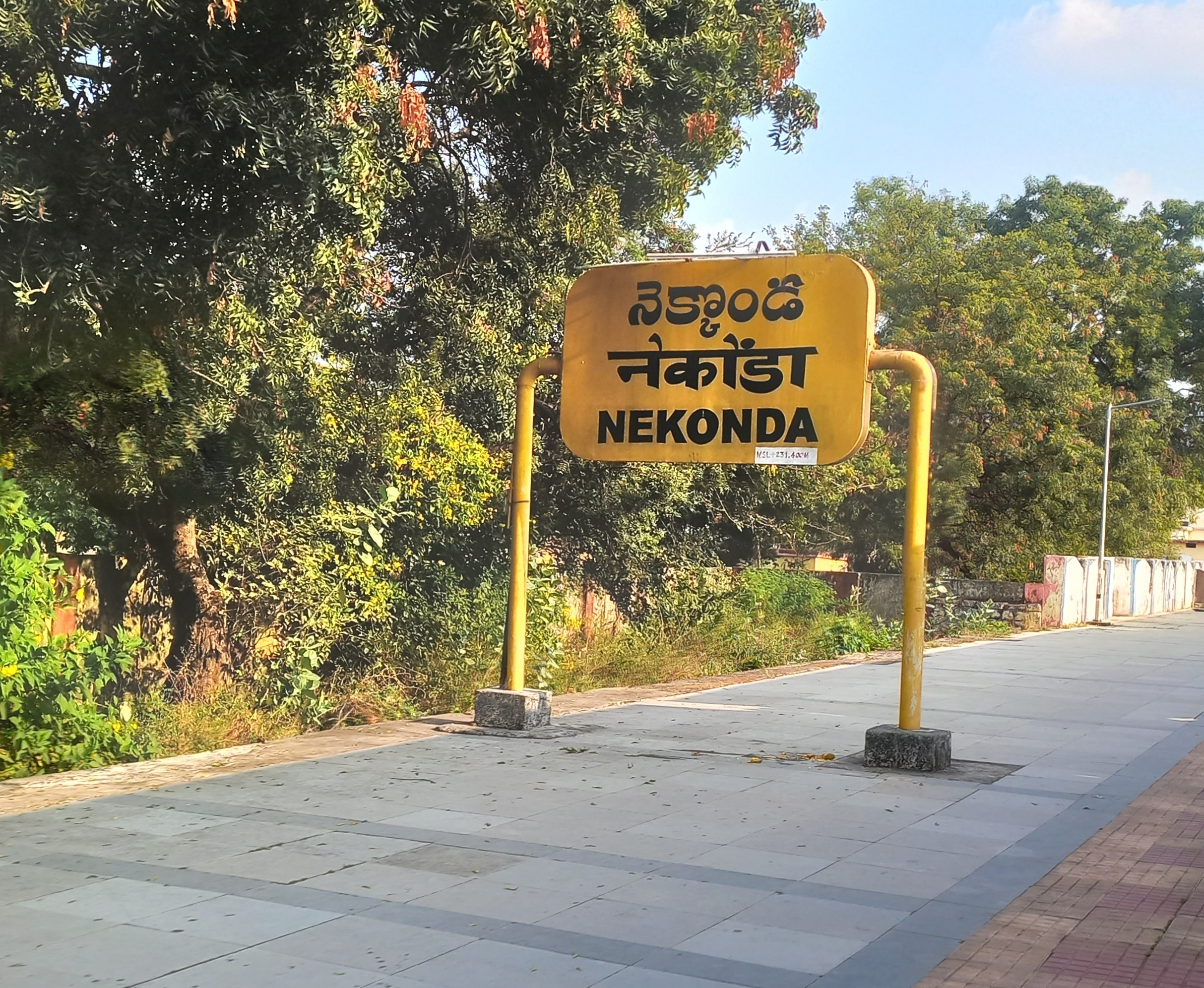
- Interactive map of Nekkonda
- Country: India
- State: Telangana
- District: Warangal district
- Talukas: NEKKONDA

Languages
  - Official: Telugu
- Time zone: UTC+5:30 (IST)
- PIN: 506122
- Vehicle registration: TS 24
- Website: telangana.gov.in

Nekkonda is a village and a Mandal in Warangal district in the state of Telangana in India.

In 2011, it had a population of 7 624. In 2024, express train stoppages of the Guntur–Secunderabad Intercity Express were introduced, after the inhabitants started pooling money to ensure sufficient revenue.

The village Panikera is located within the Mandal.
