= Geesugonda =

- Mandal
- Location in Telangana, India Geesugonda (India)
- Coordinates: 17.964772°N 79.697213°E
- Country: India
- State: Telangana
- District: Warangal district
- Elevation: 302 m (991 ft)

Population (2006)
  - Total: 4,778

Languages
  - Official: Telugu
- Time zone: UTC+5:30 (IST)
- PIN: 506330
- Telephone code: 0870
- Vehicle registration: TS 24, TS 03
- Sex ratio: 1:1 ♂/♀
- Website: telangana.gov.in

Geesukonda is a village and a mandal in Warangal district in the state of Telangana in India.

- List of Villages in Geesugonda Mandal.
- Villages In Mandal
- 1. Anantharam
- 2. Bodduchintalapalle
- 3. Dharmaram
- 4. Elkurthy
- 5. Geesugonda
- 6. Gorrekunta
- 7. Kommala
- 8. Machapur
- 9. Manugonda
- 10. Mogilicherla
- 11. Ookal
- 12. Potharajpalle
- 13. Arepalle Haveli
- 14. Shayampet
- 15. Stambampalle
- 16. Vanchangiri
- 17. Vasanthapur
- 18. Viswanathpur .
