= Narsampet =

- Municipality
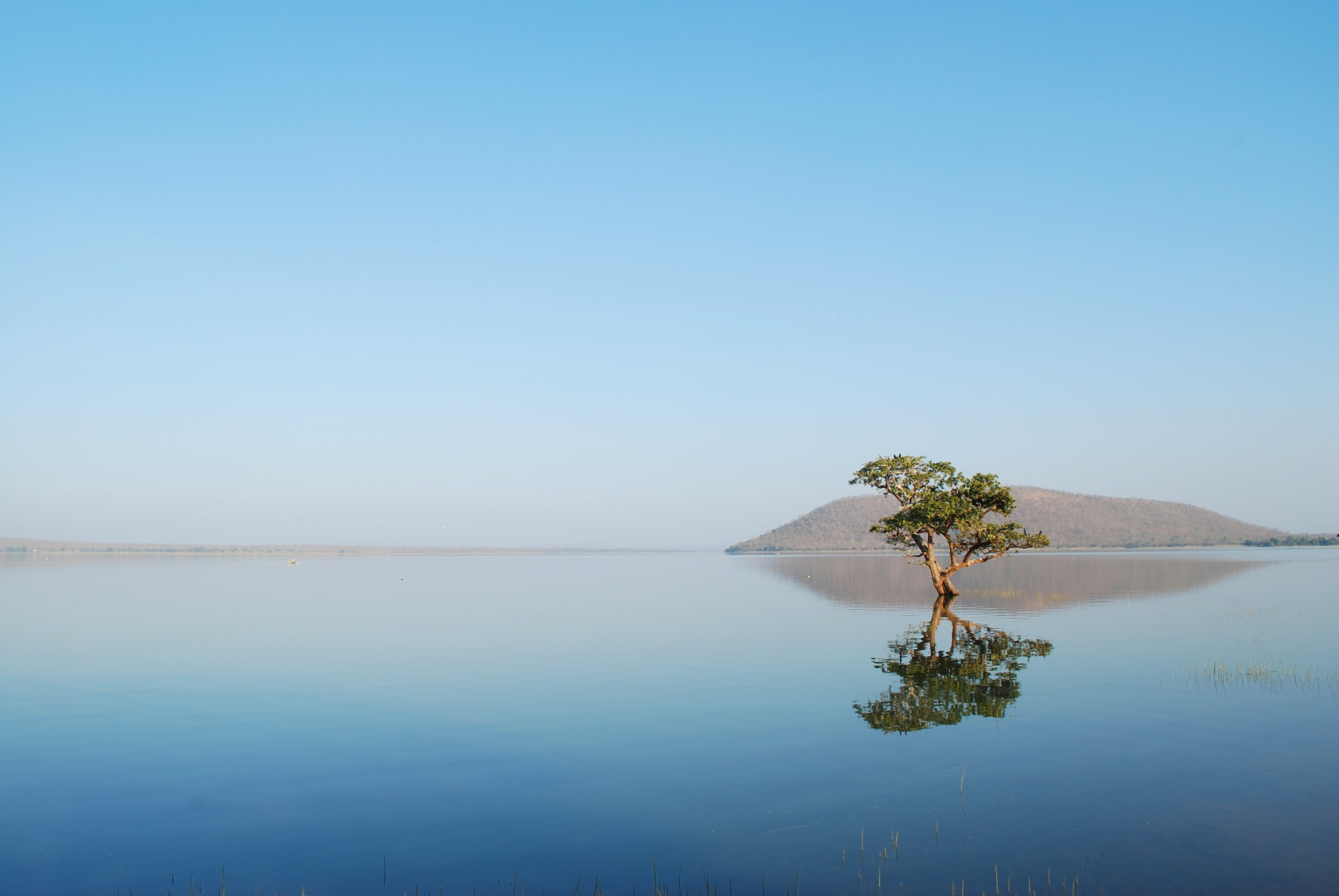
- Pakhal Lake in Khanapur Mandal

- Location in Telangana, India Narsampet (India)
- Coordinates: 17.926394°N 79.896941°E
- Country: India
- State: Telangana
- District: Warangal district
- Talukas: Narsampet

Area
  - Total: 11.52 km^{2} (4.45 sq mi)
  - Rank: 1
- Elevation: 221 m (725 ft)

Population (2011)
  - Total: 60,000
  - Density: 5,200/km^{2} (13,000/sq mi)

Languages
  - Official: Telugu
- Time zone: UTC+5:30 (IST)
- PIN: 506132
- Vehicle registration: TG 24
- Website: telangana.gov.in

Narsampet is a largest Town in Warangal district of the Indian state of Telangana. Headquarters of Narsampet Revenue Division (it is one of the 5 Revenue divisions in Erstwhile Warangal district). As part of Telangana Districts re-organisation. The town is 36 km east of District Headquarter Warangal.

There are many rice mills which replicates rich agricultural growth in the region and colleges in the Town Such as Government Medical College, BITS, JITS, Siddarth Degree College etc.The Town has rice mills, oil mills, Agricultural Market Committee, and all departmental offices. The Narsampet Town is a small commercial centre, for a region covering about 240 villages including some of villages from Mahabubabad and Mulugi Districts. The villages depend on Narsampet to market their agricultural produce and to procure their consumer needs.

== Geography ==
Narsampet is in Warangal District of Telangana, at 17 degrees 55 minutes north to 79 degrees 54 minutes east. Narsampet has average altitude of 221 meters.

== Administration of Narsampet ==
Narsampet is a minor historical place in Telangana. Narsampet was Under Nizam Rule when it was in colonial times. Before independence, the administrative unit of Narsampet was officially known as Pakhal Taluka because of its proximity to the area's lifeline - the Pakhal Lake, major lake for drinking water in the region built by the Kakatiya rulers. During Andhra Pradesh Narsampet was first upgraded as Nagara panchayat with 20 wards from major Grampanchayath. In 2018 Government of Telangana merged the neighbouring Dwarakapet Sarvapuram. And latest Moqdumpuram and Maheshwaram, Madhannapeta, Nagurlapalli, Mutthojipeta, Ramulunaik tanda, Parshan naik tanda, Rajapalli villages into Narsampet Municipality. The Town has 30 wards (increased from 24 to 30) and 300 colonies.Warangal District Government General Hospital has been set up in Narsampeta town centre. Similarly, the only women's special jail in the joint district has been set up here.

== Politics in Narsampet ==
BRS, BJP, and INC are the major political parties in this area. Narsampet comes under Narsampet assembly constituency, the current elected Member of Legislative Assembly(MLA) is Donthi Madhava Reddy from INC, won against the BRS candidate Peddi Sudarshan Reddy in the assembly elections held during the months of Nov-Dec 2023 and won with a majority of 18,800. The MLA is all set to swear as minister during his stint, sources say the portfolio assigned would be Agricultural Ministry for the state Telangana. Mr. Madhava Reddy was elected as MLA during the assembly election held in 2014. This mark his second victory as MLA. Narsampet comes under Mahabubabad parliament constituency, the current sitting MP is Balram Naik from INC.

== Government and politics ==
Civic administration

Narsampet Municipality was constituted in 2011 and has 30 election wards. The jurisdiction of the civic body is spread over an area of 11.52 km^{2} (4.45 mi^{2}).

== Educational Institutions ==
Narsampet is the largest city in Warangal district with the largest number of educational institutions after Warangal city. Both Government and private institutions has their presence in the city.

- Balaji Institute of Technology & Science (Autonomous)
- Government Degree College (Autonomous)
- Jayamukhi Institute of Technological Sciences (Autonomous)
- Government Medical College
- Government Nursing College
- Government Para Medical College
- There are more than 20 government Gurukuls

== Demographics ==
Narsampet is a Census Village in the district of Warangal, Telangana. The population of the town as per the 2011 census is 30,231, 2024 estimate 71,000 population including recently merged villeges.

Demographics of Narsampet Town (2011)
1. Hinduism (90.0%)
2. Islam (8.25%)
3. Christianity (1.75%)

== Transportation ==
Narsampet TSRTC Bus Depot All bus service are below

- Narsampet to Warangal.

Narsampet to Hanamkonda.

Narsampet to Yellandu via Kothaguda, Gangaram.

Narsampet to Nizamabad.

Narsampet to Adilabad.

Narsampet to Mahabubnagar(suspended).

Narsampet to Yadagirigutta (suspended).

Narsampet to Mulugu.

Narsampet to Eturnagaram.(suspended)

Narsampet to mahabubabad

Narsampet to Bhochervu via Gudur.

Narsampet to Dabeerpet.

Narsampet to Machiryal.

Narsampet to Bhadrachalam.

Narsampet to Hyderabad.

Narsampet to Khammam via thorrur

Narsampet to Khammam via mahabubabad (suspended)

Narsampet to Kukatpally (suspended)

Narsampet to Jagadgirigutta (suspended)

Narsampet to Tirupati.

Narsampet to Srisailam.

Narsampet to Vishakapatnam (suspended).

Narsampet to kakinada (suspended).

Narsampet to Ongole (suspended).

Narsampet to Shiridi (suspended).

Narsampet to parkal.

Narsampet to Thorruur.

Narsampet to uparapally.

Narsampet to pakhala rampur.

Narsampet to ottai thanda.

Narsampet to saddireddypelli.

Narsampet to musimi.

Narsampet to ponugundla.

Narsampet to jangalapally.

Narsampet to vellubally.(suspended)

Narsampet to vemulawada.

Narsampet to Gurjala.

Narsampet to Dharmaraopet.

Narsampet to Kaleshwaram via Mulugu.

Narsampet to Karlai/Thati vari vempally.

Narsampet to Kondapur via medapalli.

Narsampet to Asaravelli via Medapalli.

Narsampet to Dharmaraopet via Gudur.

Narsampet to Warangal via Madanapet, Nallabelly.

Narsampet to Dubbagudem.

Narsampet to Gundala via Pakhala kothaguda, Karnegandi. (Suspended)

Thudum debba proclaimed that to join all Agency mandals of Godavari River basin to start new bus service.

Narsampet--- Pakhala Kothaguda--- Gangaram--- Gundala--- Veerapuram--- Karakagudem--- Pinapaka--- Edurlla Byarram--- Manuguru.

== Literacy ==
The literacy rate of Narsampet Village is 81.17% higher than the state average of 67.02%. In Narsampet, male literacy is around 89.70% while the female literacy rate is 72.13%.

== Weather and Climate of Narsampet ==
It is hot in summer. Narsampet summer highest day temperature is between 33 °C to 46 °C. Average temperatures of January is 25 °C, February is 25 °C, March is 29 °C, April is 33 °C, May is 38 °C

== Villages in Narsampet Mandal ==
- List of villages in Narsampet Rural Mandal

1.Akulthanda 2.Bhanjipeta 3.Bhojyanaikthanda 4.Itikalapalli 5.Enugalthanda 6.Ippalthanda 7.Muthyalammathanda 8.Rajupeta 9.Chandhraiapalli 10.Rajeshwararaopalli 11.Kammapelli 12.Dasaripalli 13.Laknepalli 14.Ramavaram 15.Gurijala 16.ChinnaGurijala 17.GurralaGandi Rajapalli 18.Gunturupalli 19.Patha Mukdumpuram. 20.Dwarakapet 21.Sarwapuram
