= Warangal district =

- District of Telangana
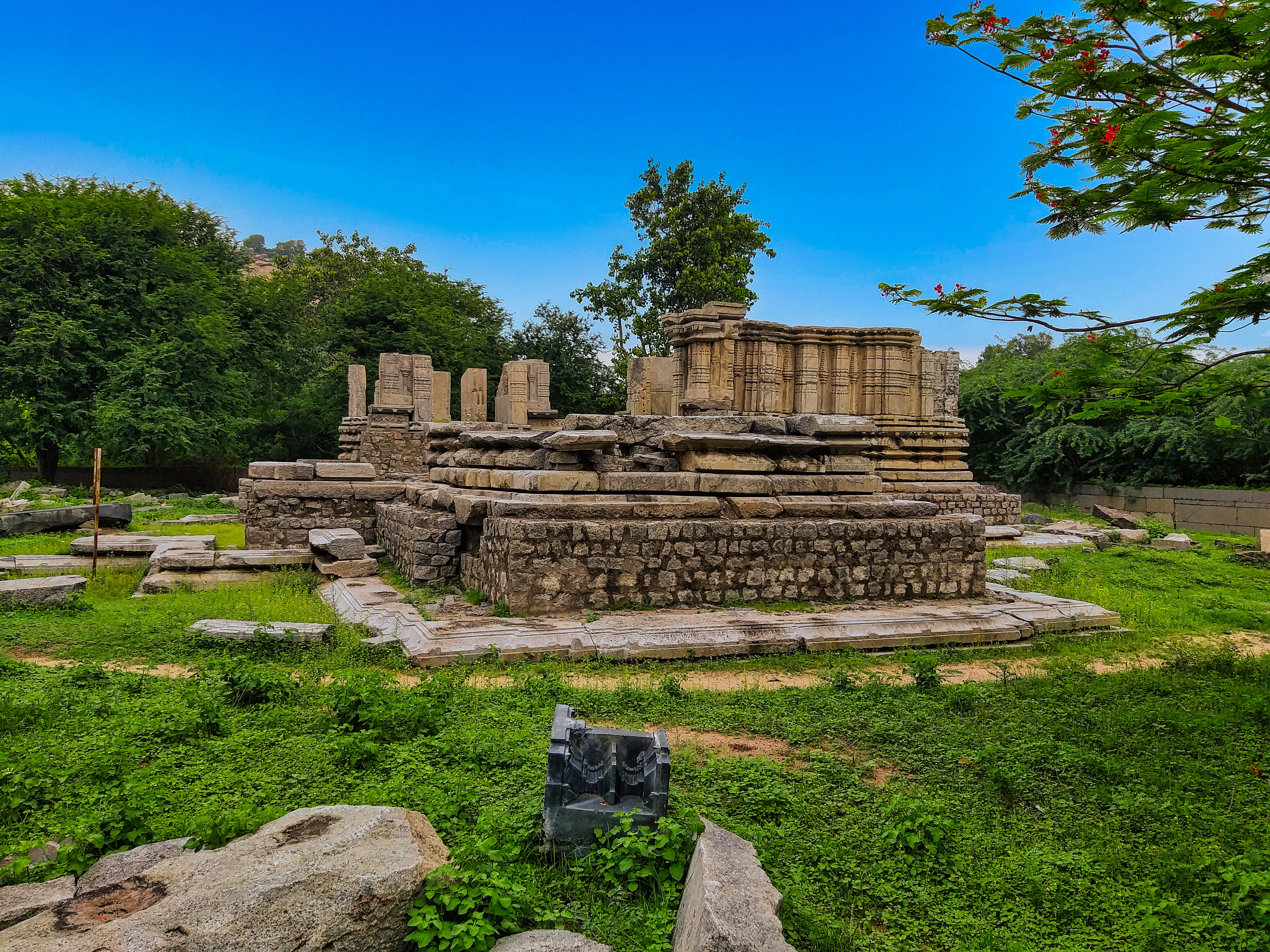
- Kummarigullu Trikutalaya Temple, Nidigonda

- Location in Telangana
- Warangal district
- Country: India
- State: Telangana
- Established: 1866
- Reorganisation: 1905, 1953, 2016, 2021
- Headquarters: Hanamkonda (tentative); Warangal (proposed)
- Mandalas: 13

Government
  - District collector: Dr.B Gopi IAS

Area
  - Total: 2,095 km^{2} (809 sq mi)

Population (2011)
  - Total: 718,537
  - Density: 343.0/km^{2} (888.3/sq mi)
- Time zone: UTC+05:30 (IST)
- Vehicle registration: TG 24
- GDPNominal (2022-23): ₹18,887.48 crore (equivalent to ₹210 billion or US$2.1 billion in 2026)
- Per capita income (2022–23): ₹222,640 (equivalent to ₹240,000 or US$2,500 in 2026)
- Website: warangal.telangana.gov.in

Warangal district is a district in the Indian state of Telangana. The district shares boundaries with Mahabubabad, Jangaon, Hanamkonda, Mulugu and Bhupalpally districts.

As of June 2021, Hanamkonda tentatively serves as the district headquarters of both Hanamkonda and Warangal districts. Warangal city is proposed to replace Hanamkonda as the new headquarters of the Warangal district.

The district was formed in 2016 by carving out Warangal Rural district from the erstwhile Warangal district. In August 2021, the Warangal Rural district was renamed back to Warangal district. Warangal and Khila Warangal mandals are transferred to the newly formed Warangal district.

== History ==
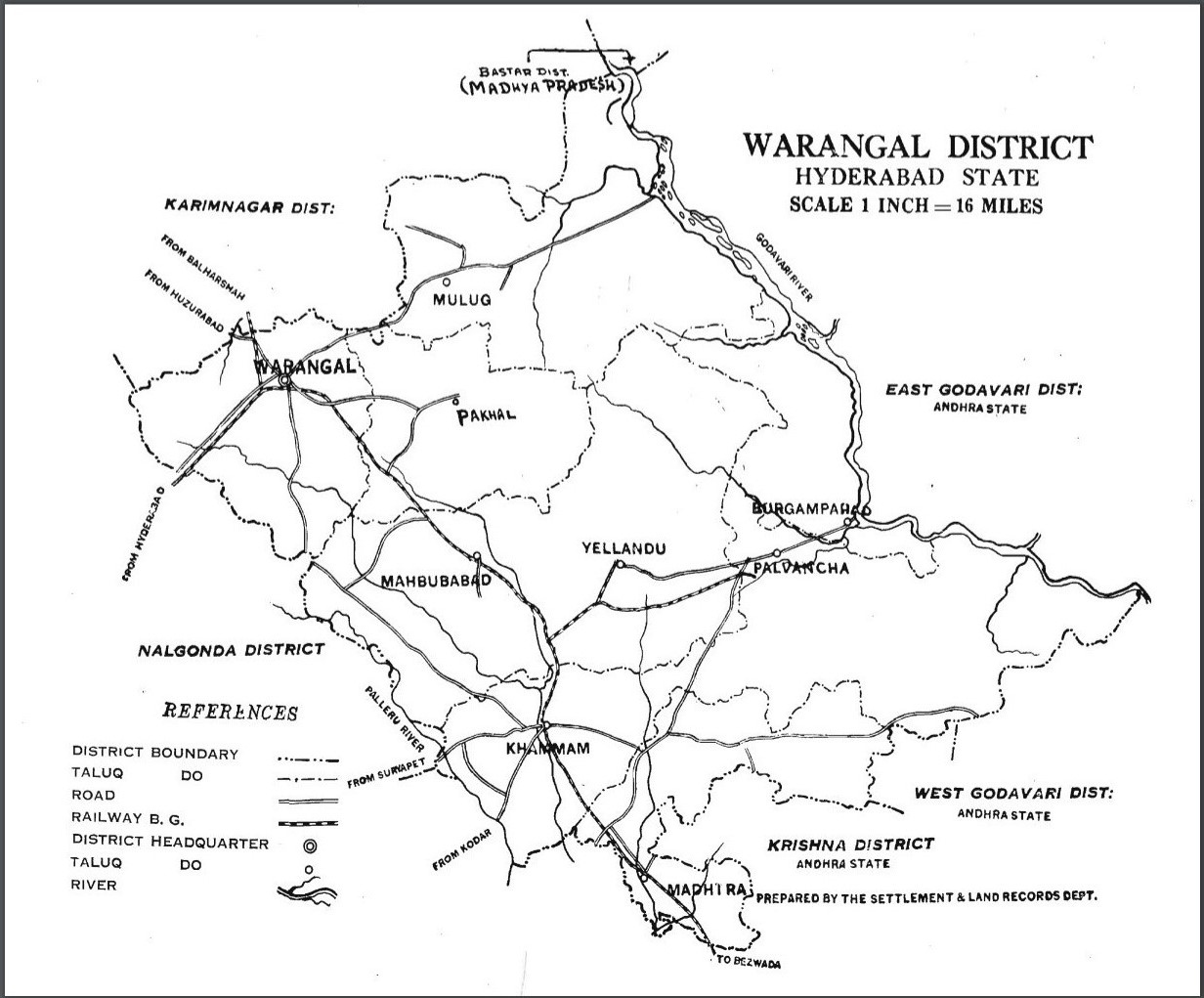
Warangal District 1905 to 1953

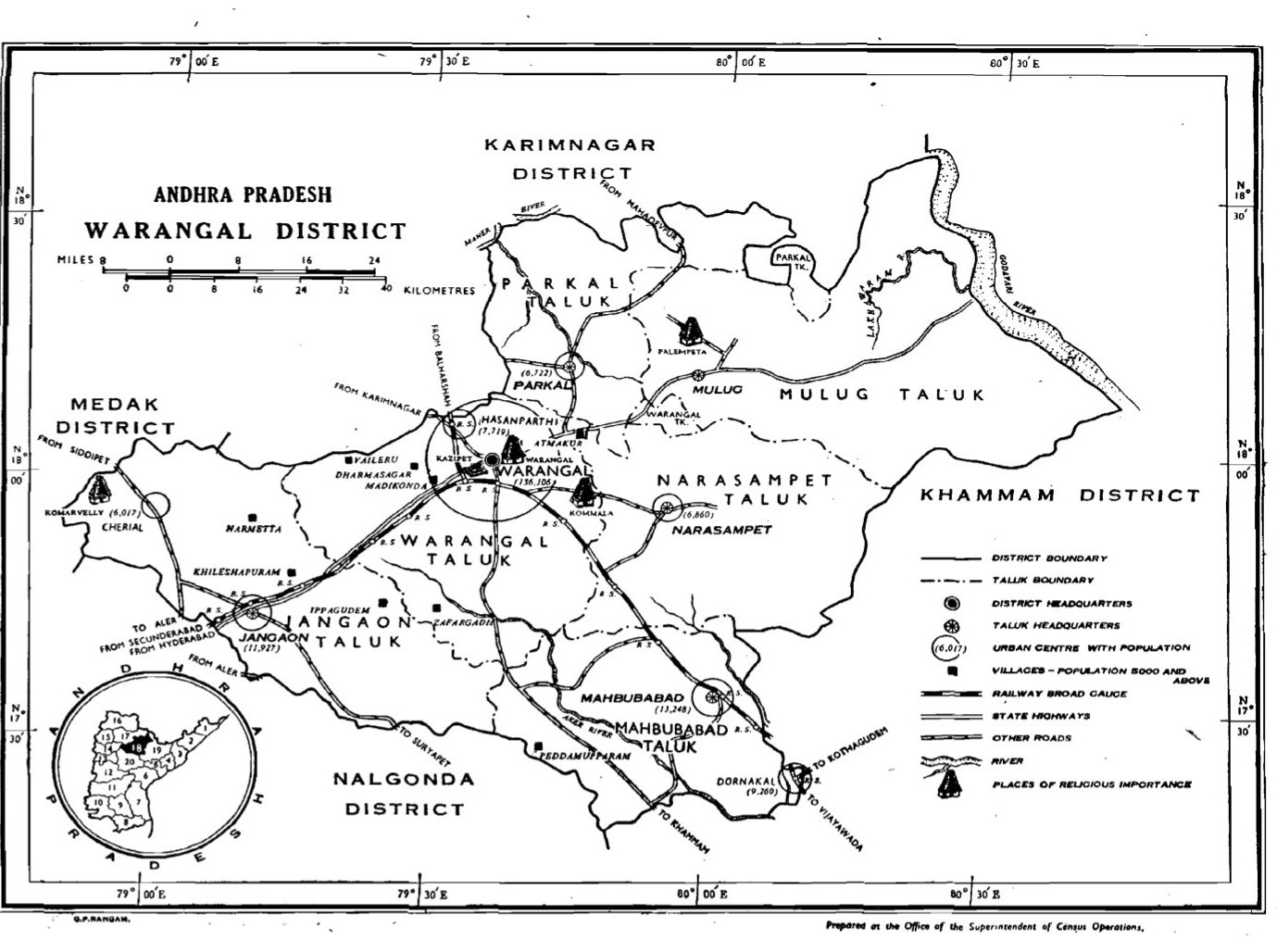
Warangal District With Talukas until 1979

Erstwhile Warangal district consisted of many prehistoric habitation sites, which were explored by the Indian archaeological authorities. Paleolithic Rock art paintings are found at Pandavula Gutta.

Padmakshi Gutta, a Jain temple dedicated to Padmavati located on a hilltop in the heart of the town of Hanamkonda, was originally constructed during the Kakatiya era. The temple has sculptures of Jain tirthankaras and other Jain gods and goddesses. The Kadalalaya basadi or Padmakshi Temple is built on a large rocky outcrop.

The Kakatiyas left many monuments, including impressive fortress, four massive stone gateways, the Swayambhu temple dedicated to Shiva, and the Ramappa temple situated near Ramappa Lake. Prominent rulers included Ganapathi Deva, Prathapa Rudra, and Rudrama Devi. After the defeat of Pratapa Rudra, the Musunuri Nayaks united 72 Nayak chieftains and captured Warangal from Delhi sultanate and ruled for fifty years. Jealousy and mutual rivalry between Nayaks ultimately led to the downfall of Hindus in 1370 and the rise of the Bahmani Sultanate.

The Bahmani Sultanate later broke up into several smaller sultanates, of which the Golconda sultanate ruled Warangal. The Mughal emperor Aurangzeb conquered Golconda in 1687, and it remained part of the Mughal empire until the southern provinces of the empire split away to become the state of Hyderabad in 1724 which included the Telangana region and some parts of Maharashtra and Karnataka. Hyderabad became an Indian state in 1948. In 1956 Hyderabad was partitioned as part of the States Reorganisation Act, and Telangana, the Telugu-speaking region of Hyderabad state which includes Warangal, became part of Andhra Pradesh. After the bifurcation of the state of Andhra Pradesh, the district became a part of the new state of Telangana.

=== Formation of district ===
During the rule of Nizam of Hyderabad, State of Hyderabad was divided into many small Circars. Warangal became a Circar in the early 1800s. In 1866 Circars was Abolished and merged to create districts, Warangal district was created by merging Warungal, Khummettu and part of Bhonagheer circars. Jangaon area from Bhongir Circar was transferred to warangal and kamalpur area of warangal transferred to Karimnagra district. In 1905 when Princely state of Hyderabad sub divided into Four Division namely 1.Aurangabad Division, 2.Gulbarga Division, 3.Gulshanabad Division, 4.Warangal Division. During formation divisions again districts were delimited in 1905 Jangaon(Cherial) Taluka and Kodar(Kodad) Sub Taluka transferred to Nalgonda District from Warangal district. In 1905 AD, Warangal district was formed with Warangal, Pakala, Khammam, Yellandu, Mahabubabad, Madhira, Palvancha taluks and some area of old palvancha sanstan and some jagirs. This was bigger than many districts of Hyderabad state.

Warangal district was divided to facilitate administrative control and on October 1, 1953, the Khmman district was formed. Khammam, Yellandu, Madhira, Burugunpahad and Palavancha talukas have been made part of it. Warangal, Mulugu, Mahaboobabad, Pakala remained in Warangal district. But Parkaala from Karimnagar and Jangaon from Nalgonda have become part of Warangal district. District uses to consist of 6 talukas and 2 revenue divisions which later increased to 15 talukas in 1979. In 1985 when N. T. Rama Rao introduces mandal system in warangal district was divided in to 50 mandals, but again warangal mandal was curved out from Hanamkonda madal consisting only urban area of warangal which increased to total 51 mandals and revenue divisions increased to 5 in warangal district.

After formation of Telangana and as part of creation of new districts, initially Warangal Rural district was curved out from old Warangal district which split into 5 new districts they are Warangal urban, Warangal rural, Jangaon, Jayashanker and Mahabubabad in October 2016 along with other total new 33 districts. However, on the demand of the public, the Warangal Rural and Warangal Urban districts were reorganised as Warangal district and Hanumakonda district with 13 and 14 mandals respectively vide GO.Ms.No. (Revenue (DA) Dept. on 12 August 2021.

== Geography ==
The district is spread over an area of 2,175.50 square kilometres (839.97 sq mi).

== Demographics ==
Religion in Warangal district (2011)
Hinduism	95.58%
Islam	3.56%
Christianity	0.63%
Other or not stated	0.23%

As of 2011 Census of India, Warangal district has a population of 718,537. Warangal has a sex ratio of 994 females per 1000 males and a literacy rate of 61.26%. 67,134 (9.34%) were under 6 years of age. 50,213 (6.99%) lived in urban areas. Scheduled Castes and Scheduled Tribes made up 128,568 (17.89%) and 105,300 (14.65%) of the population respectively.

Languages of Warangal district (2011)
1. Telugu (83.8%)
2. Lambadi (12.3%)
3. Urdu (2.67%)
4. Others (1.27%)

At the time of the 2011 census, 83.77% of the population spoke Telugu, 12.29% Lambadi and 2.67% Urdu as their first language.

== Administrative divisions ==
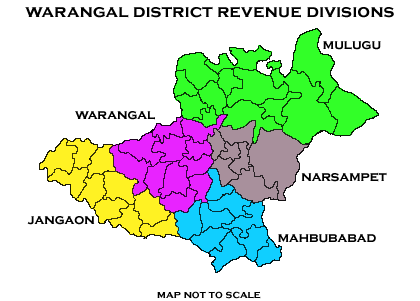
Undivided Warangal District from 1st Oct 1953 to 10th Oct 2016

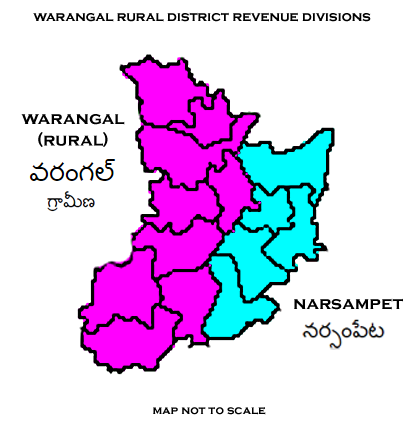
Warangal (rural) District Revenue divisions

The district will have Two revenue divisions of Warangal and Narsampet. It is sub-divided into 13 mandals. Haritha is the present collector of the district.

=== Mandals ===
The district has two revenue divisions i.e., Warangal and Narasampet and is sub-divided into 13 mandals.

Warangal Revenue Division:

1. Warangal
2. Khila Warangal or Fort Warangal
3. Geesugonda
4. Sangem
5. Wardhannapet
6. Rayaparthy
7. Parvathagiri
8. Shayampet
9. Athmakur

Narasampet Revenue Division:

1. Nallabelly
2. Duggondi
3. Narsampet
4. Khanapur (NSPT)
5. Chennaraopet
6. Nekkonda

== See also ==
- List of districts in Telangana
